= Albert Spencer Wilcox Building =

- U.S. National Register of Historic Places
- Hawaiʻi Register of Historic Places
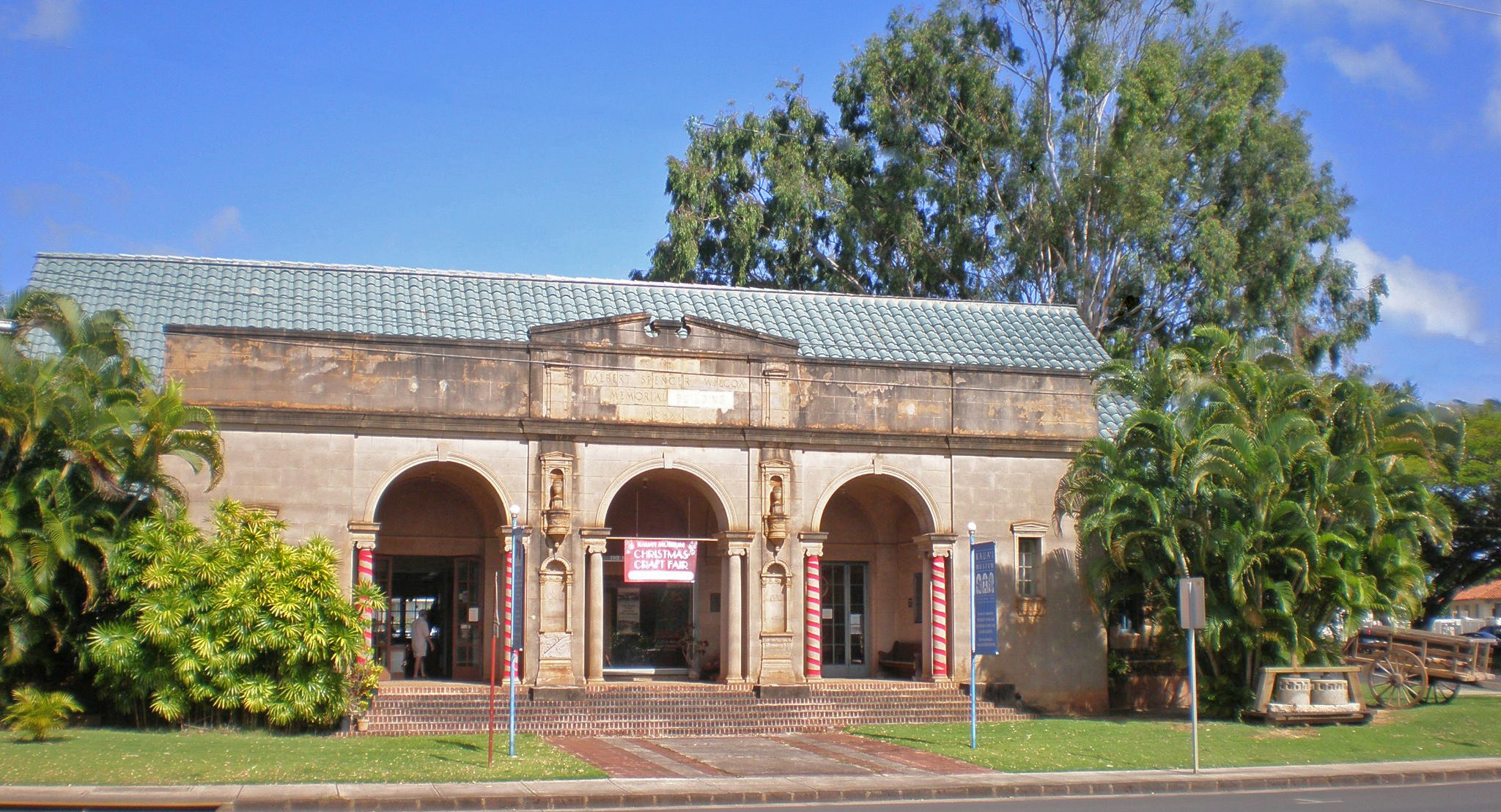
- Kauaʻi Museum

- Location within Hawaii
- Location: 4428 Rice Street; Līhuʻe, Kauaʻi, Hawaii
- Coordinates: 21°58′29″N 159°22′6″W
- Area: 0.5 acres (0.20 ha)
- Built: 1924
- Architect: Hart Wood
- NRHP reference No.: 79000760
- HRHP No.: 50-30-11-09344

Significant dates
- Added to NRHP: May 31, 1979
- Designated HRHP: February 17, 1979

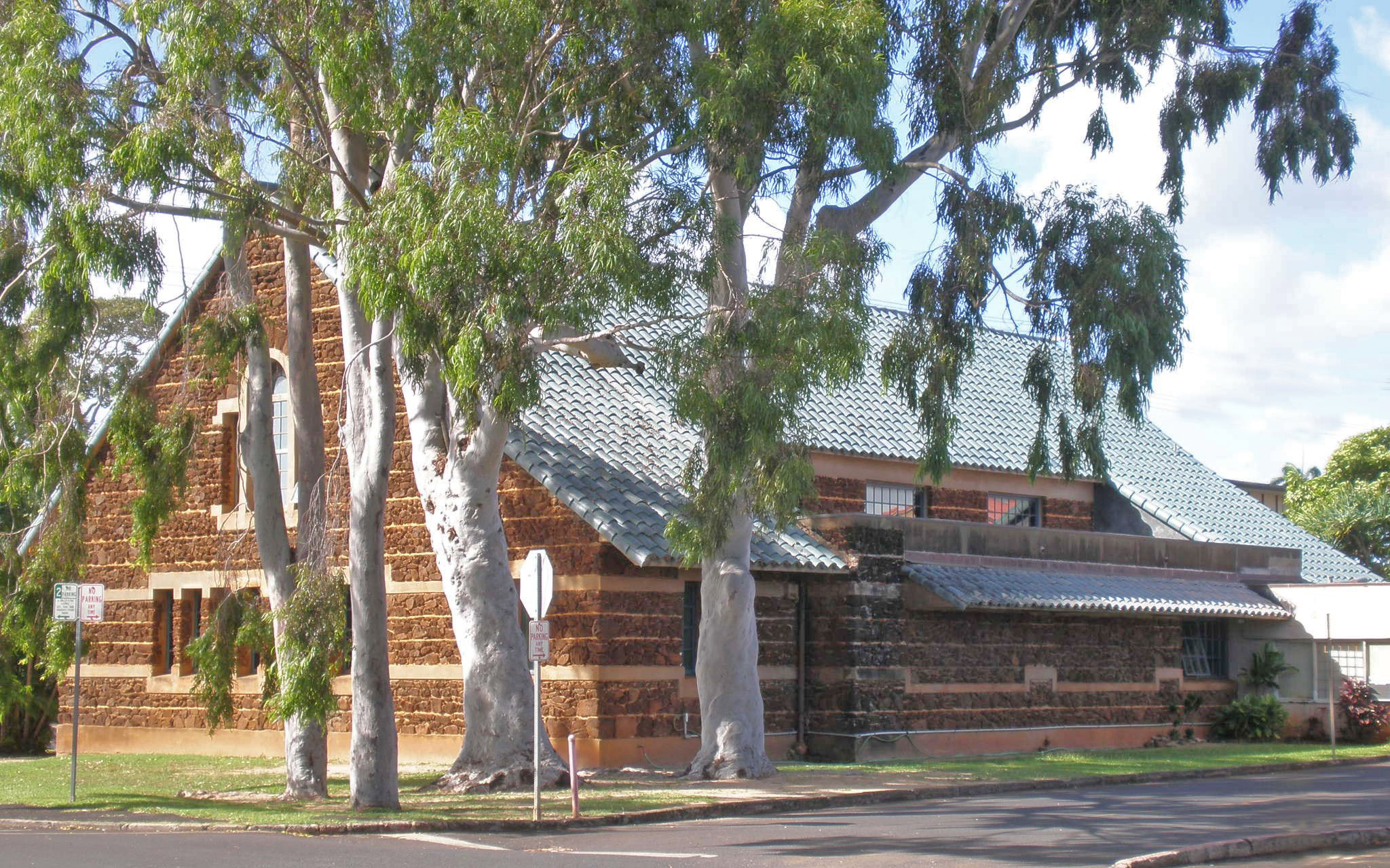
Rear view shows stone structure

The Albert Spencer Wilcox Building is a historic building in Līhuʻe, Kauaʻi, Hawaii. Originally a library when it opened in 1924, it was later converted into the Kauaʻi Museum. It has exhibits on the history of the island of Kauaʻi. It was added to both the Hawaiʻi Register of Historic Places and the National Register of Historic Places in 1979.

== Library ==
The first library on the island of Kauaʻi was probably established by Reverend John Mortimer Lydgate in 1900 at his church in Līhuʻe. After moving to a temporary home in 1921, a permanent home was needed. On February 3, 1922, Emma Kauikeolani Wilcox, widow of businessman and politician Albert Spencer Wilcox (1844–1919) offered US$75,000 for a public library on Kauaʻi. In October 1922 architect Hart Wood was selected to design the building named in honor of Wilcox. Built with John Hansen as general contractor, it opened in 1924 to house the first public library on the island.

== Museum ==
In April 1954 a committee started raising funds for a museum to be built next to the library. Juliet Rice Wichman was chair of the committee. A granddaughter of businessman and politician William Hyde Rice, she had married Frederick Warren Wichman after the death of her first husband Holbrook M. Goodale. The new building was designed by architect Kenneth Roehrig and named for Rice. Wichman became the museum's first director, and would later co-found the National Tropical Botanical Garden and donate land to become the Limahuli Garden and Preserve to the garden. The first manager of the museum was Dora Jane Isenberg Cole (1917–1988), a second cousin of Wichman sharing great-grandfather William Harrison Rice (1813–1862) but Paul Isenberg (1837–1903) as her paternal grandfather.

On December 3, 1960, the museum opened to the public in the Rice building. In 1969 the state of Hawaii built a new library building, and the Wilcox building was converted to house additional exhibits of the Kauaʻi Museum, opening in December 1970.

== Preservation ==
The Wilcox building was listed on the Hawaiʻi Register of Historic Places as state historic site 50-30-11-9344 on February 17, 1979. It was added to the National Register of Historic Places listings in Hawaii on May 31, 1979, as site 79000760. It is located at 4428 Rice Street, 21°58′29″N 159°22′6″W in Līhuʻe.

== Family tree ==
Rice–Cooke family tree

William Harrison Rice (1813–1862)	Mary Sophia Hyde (1816–1911)	Amos Starr Cooke (1810–1871)	Juliette Montague (1812–1896)
Paul Isenberg (1837–1903)	Maria Rice (1842–1867)	William Hyde Rice (1846–1924)	Anna Rice (1853–1934)	C. M. Cooke (1849–1909)
D. Paul R. Isenberg (1866–1919)	Charles A. Rice (1876–1899)	Harold Rice (1883–1962)	C. M. Cooke Jr. (1874–1948)	Clarence Hyde Cooke (1876–1944)	George Paul Cooke (1882-1960)
Dora Jane Cole (1917–1988)	Juliet Rice Wichman (1901–1987)	Harold Thomas Kay (1896–1976)	Anna Frances Cooke (1903–1956)	Francis Judd Cooke (1910–1995)
Alan Cooke Kay (1932–2024)

== Gallery ==
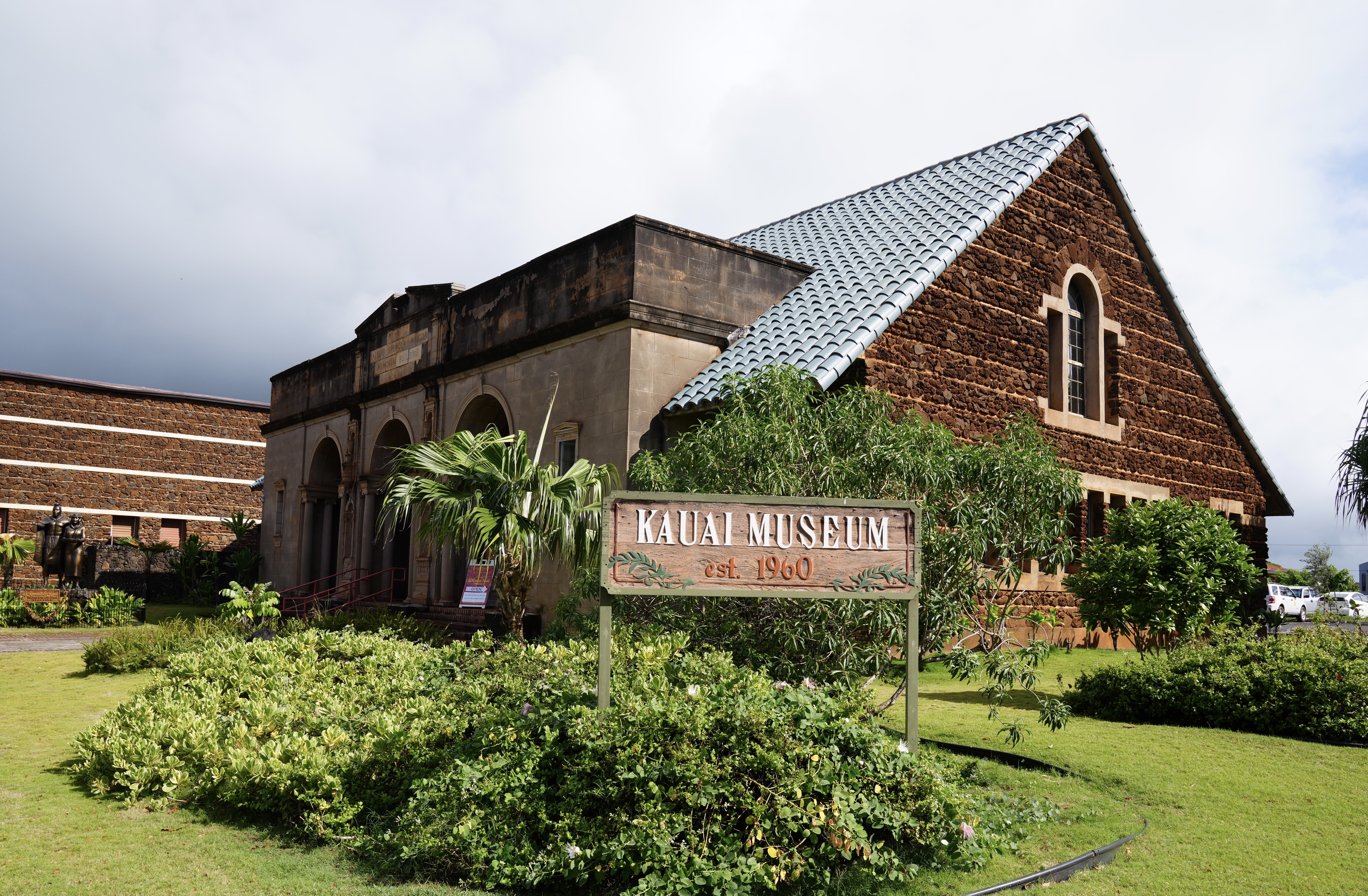
Kauaʻi Museum, 4428 Rice Street, Lihue, Hawaii

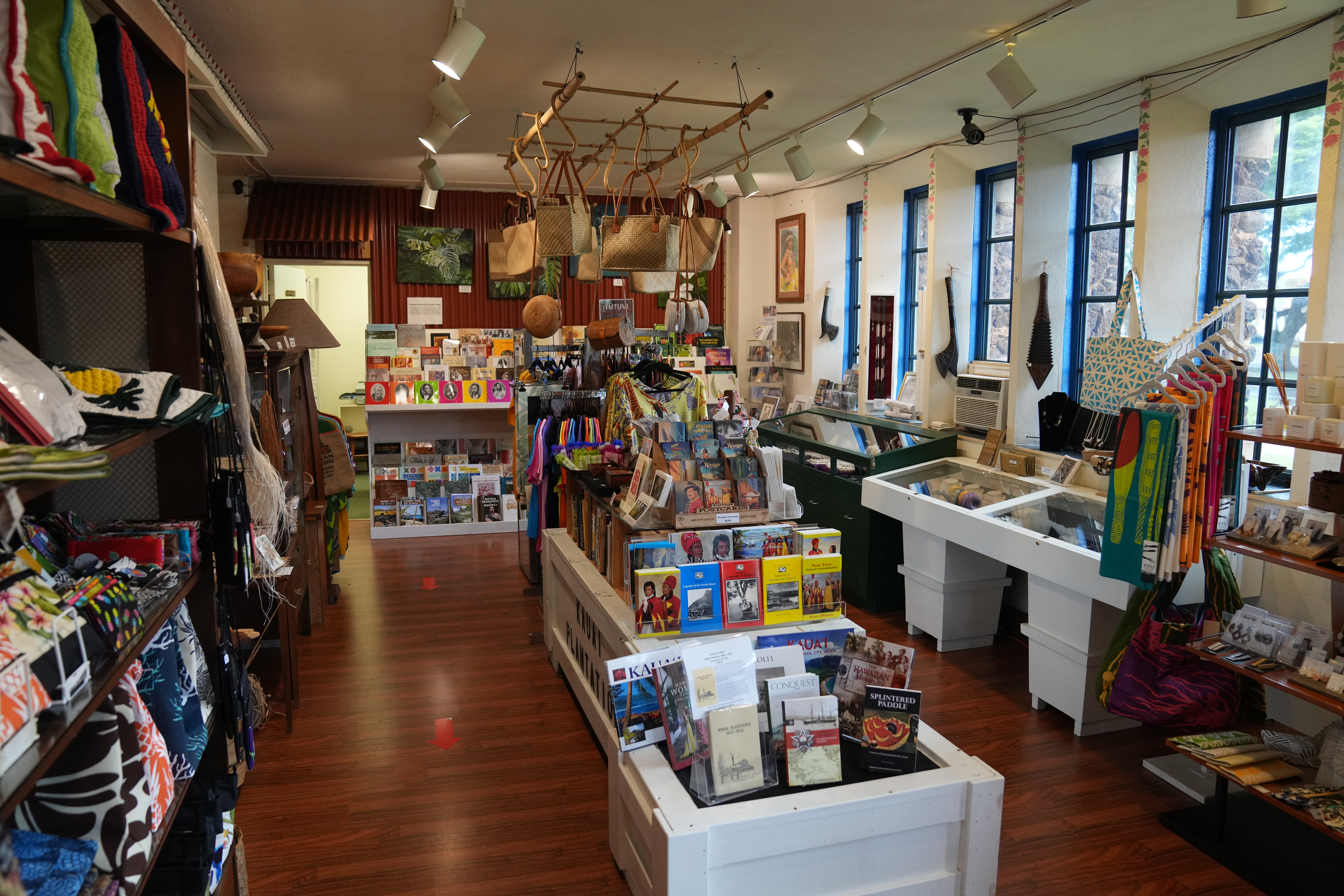
The gift shop in the Kauaʻi Museum

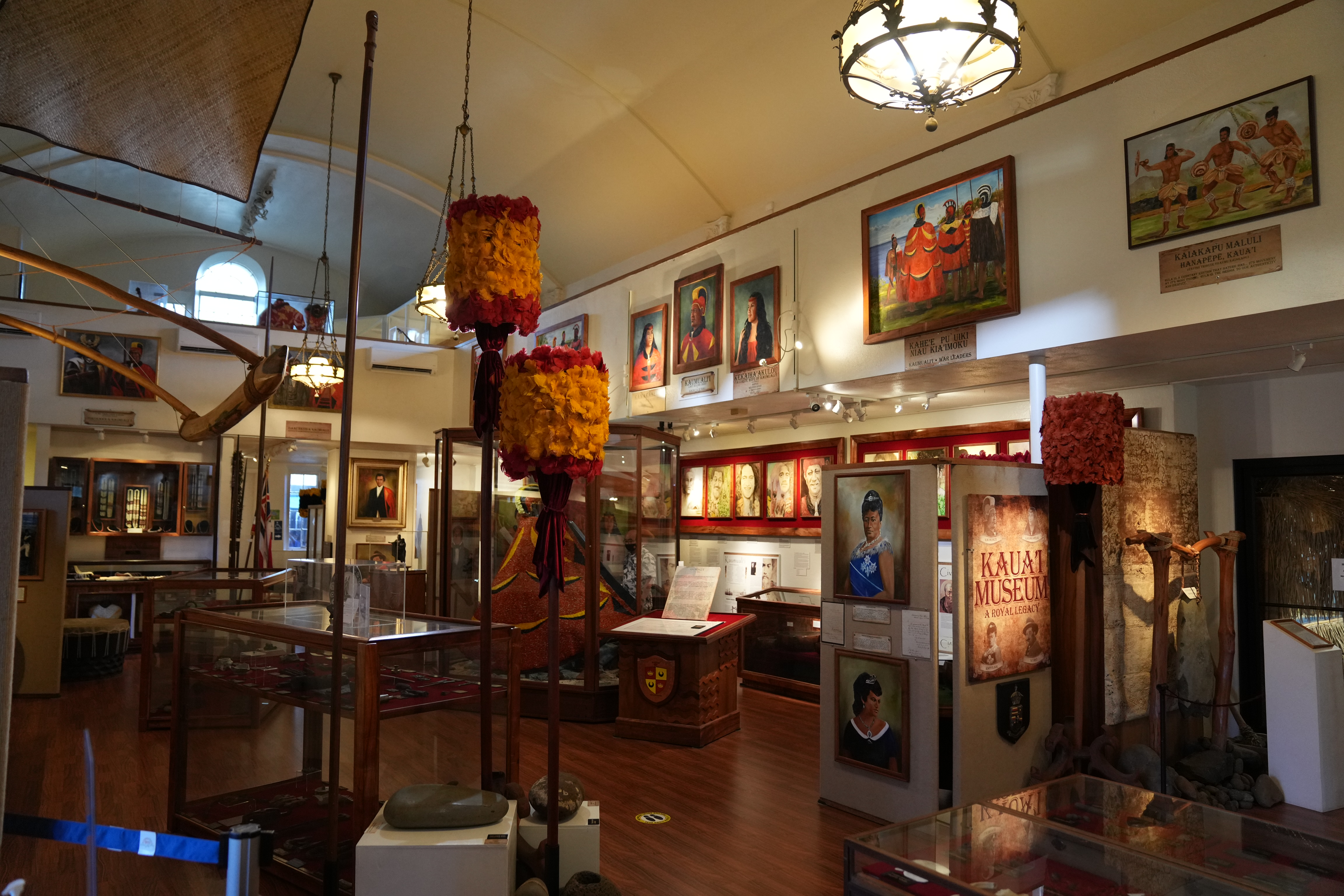
Kauaʻi Museum in the Albert Spencer Wilcox Building

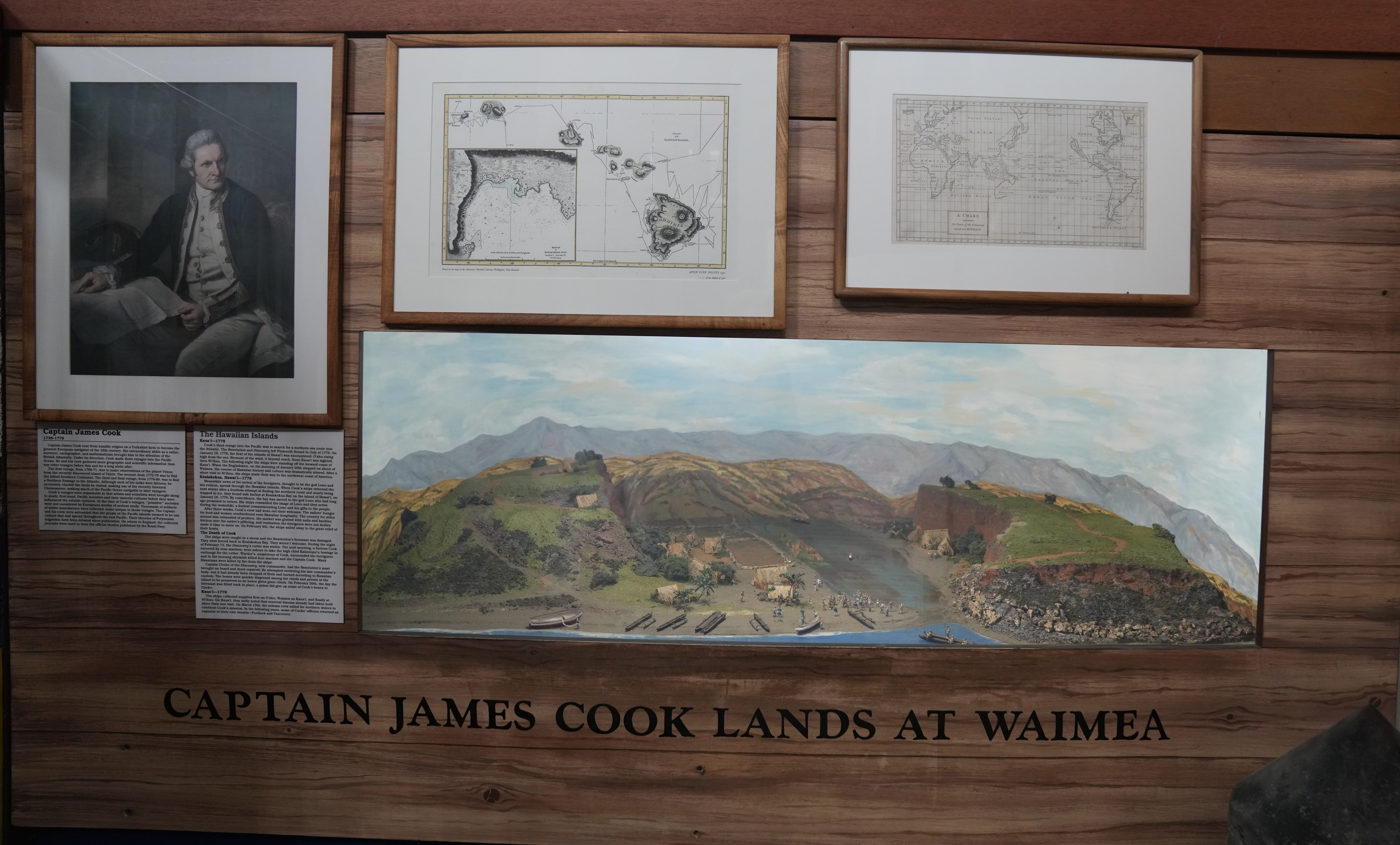
Captain James Cook Lands at Waimea Bay, Kauaʻi on January 20, 1778, an exhibit at the Kauaʻi Museum

== See also ==
- Albert Spencer Wilcox Beach House, Hanalei, Hawaii, also NRHP-listed
