= Paul Isenberg =

German businessman

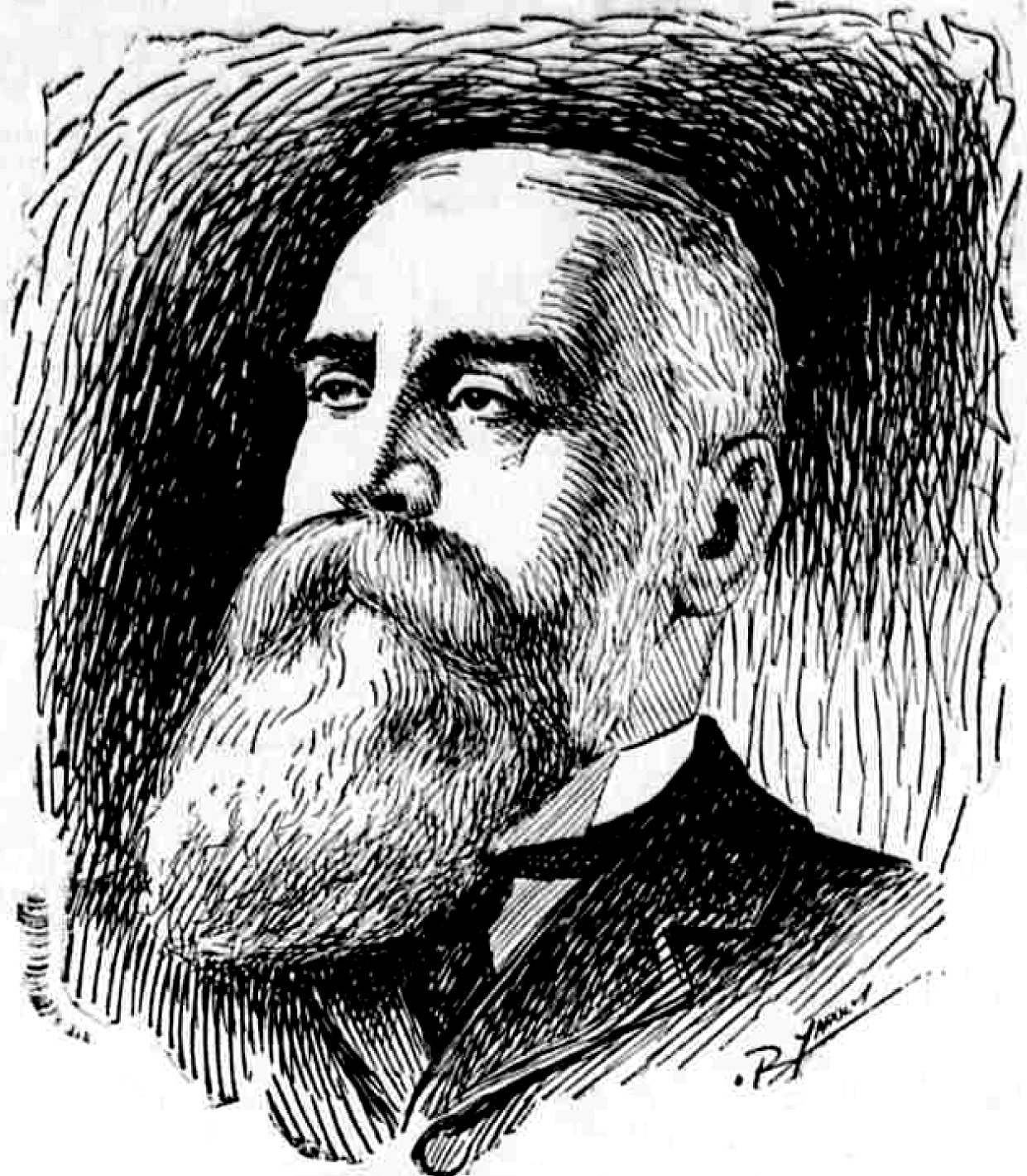
- Newspaper sketch from 1904
- Born: April 15, 1837; Dransfeld, Germany
- Died: January 16, 1903 (aged 65); Bremen, Germany
- Occupation: Businessman
- Known for: Amfac, Inc.
- Spouses: Maria Rice (m. 1861) Beta Margarete Glade (m. 1869)
- Relatives: William Harrison Rice (father-in-law)

Paul Isenberg (April 15, 1837 – January 16, 1903) was a German businessman who developed the sugarcane business in the Kingdom of Hawaii.

== Life ==
Paul Heinrich Friedrich Carl Isenberg was born April 15, 1837, in Dransfeld, Kingdom of Hanover, Germany. His father was Lutheran minister Daniel Isenberg (1807–1875), and mother was Dorothea (Strauch) Isenberg (1808–1871). He came to the Hawaiian Islands in 1858.

Isenberg moved to the island of Kauaʻi and first worked in Wailua. In October 1861 he married Hannah "Maria" Rice, daughter of William Harrison Rice (February 17, 1842—April 7, 1867). They had two children, Mary Dorothea Rice Isenberg (1862–1949) and Daniel Paul Rice Isenberg (1866–1919), known as "Paul Jr." He traveled back to Germany in 1869 where he married Beta Margarete Glade (born 1846) before returning to Hawaii. They had six more children: Johannes "John" Carl Isenberg (born September 12, 1870), Heinrich Alexander Isenberg (born January 17, 1872), Julie Maria Pauline (Isenberg) Barckhausen (born November 1876), Clara Margarete (Isenberg) Wendroth (born 1878), Richard Menno Isenberg (born 1880), and Paula Bertha Johanna Isenberg (born 1883). His daughter Clara married the "coffee king" millionaire Hermann Sielcken. After he died, she married Russian-born German baritone Joseph Schwarz.

Isenberg took over managing the sugarcane plantation at Līhuʻe in 1862, after the death of his father-in-law who was previous manager. The plantation was founded by diplomat Henry A. Peirce, but struggled to make a profit until Rice built an irrigation system. Isenberg made improvements to the cane sugar mill such as using an evaporating pan and steam pipes to concentrate the cane juice. In 1872 the Lihue Plantation company was officially incorporated, and the 3,300 acres (1,300 ha) expanded by 17,000 acres (6,900 ha) at Hanamāʻulu. On January 24, 1874, he was appointed to the upper House of Nobles in the legislature of the Hawaiian Kingdom by King Lunalilo. He officially became a citizen of the Kingdom of Hawaii at that time. In 1877 he bought equipment for a new mill from George Norton Wilcox and installed it at Hanamāʻulu to be managed by Albert Spencer Wilcox.

In 1878 Isenberg retired as plantation manager, but kept an ownership interest while moving his family back to Bremen in Germany. He visited the islands at least every two years for legislative sessions. His brother Carl Isenberg then managed the plantation. In 1881 Isenberg became a business partner with earlier German merchant Heinrich Hackfeld in his Hackfeld & Company. Although most other plantation laborers were Chinese or Japanese, Isenberg arranged for groups of workers from Bremen to settle on his company's plantations. In the 1887 session of the legislature, he was one of the few who objected to the threat of military force that caused the 1887 Constitution of the Kingdom of Hawaii to be called the "Bayonet Constitution".

He died in Bremen on January 16, 1903.

== Legacy ==
Hackfeld & Company grew to be one of the "Big Five" corporations that dominated the economy of the Territory of Hawaii. During World War I, Hackfeld & Company was seized by the U.S. government Alien Property Custodian along with other assets owned by Germans. It was sold to a consortium of Hawaii businessmen in 1918, who changed the name to "American Factors" and the company's store Liberty House. A 1920 lawsuit argued the price was below market value, and some former stockholders including John Carl Isenberg recovered some damages. In 1966, the name was further shortened to Amfac, Inc.

His son Paul Jr. married Annie Beatrice McBryde, daughter of neighboring sugar planter Duncan McBryde on October 19, 1891. On August 31, 1891 Queen Liliʻuokalani appointed him to the Privy Council. From 1898 to 1915 he was elected as representative to the house of representatives of the Territory of Hawaii, and from 1902 to 1905 the senate. He married Bertha Koepke on August 9, 1916, and they had one child, Dorothea "Dora" Jane Isenberg (1917–1988), who married Joseph Cole. Cole was first manager of the Kauaʻi Museum in 1960. In 1887 his younger brother Johannes Friedrich Wilhelm "Hans" Isenberg (1855–1918) was brought in to be pastor of the first Lutheran church on the island for the immigrants who starting arriving in 1881. Hans had married his own niece, Paul's first child, Mary Dorothea Rice Isenberg, known as Dora, in 1883.

== Family tree ==
Rice–Cooke family tree

William Harrison Rice (1813–1862)	Mary Sophia Hyde (1816–1911)	Amos Starr Cooke (1810–1871)	Juliette Montague (1812–1896)
Paul Isenberg (1837–1903)	Maria Rice (1842–1867)	William Hyde Rice (1846–1924)	Anna Rice (1853–1934)	C. M. Cooke (1849–1909)
D. Paul R. Isenberg (1866–1919)	Charles A. Rice (1876–1899)	Harold Rice (1883–1962)	C. M. Cooke Jr. (1874–1948)	Clarence Hyde Cooke (1876–1944)	George Paul Cooke (1882-1960)
Dora Jane Cole (1917–1988)	Juliet Rice Wichman (1901–1987)	Harold Thomas Kay (1896–1976)	Anna Frances Cooke (1903–1956)	Francis Judd Cooke (1910–1995)
Alan Cooke Kay (1932–2024)

== See also ==
- Sugar plantations in Hawaii
