= Charles Montague Cooke Jr. =

American malacologist (1874–1948)

- Born: December 20, 1874; Honolulu, Kingdom of Hawai'i
- Died: October 29, 1948 (aged 73)
- Occupation: Zoologist
- Spouse: Eliza Lefferts
- Children: 2
- Parent(s): Charles Montague Cooke; Anna Rice Cooke

Charles Montague Cooke Jr. (December 20, 1874 – October 29, 1948) was an American malacologist who published under the name of C. Montague Cooke or C.M. Cooke.

== Life ==
Charles Montague Cooke Jr. was born in Honolulu, Kingdom of Hawai'i on December 20, 1874. He was from a wealthy family descended from two early missionaries to Hawaii. His mother was Anna Rice Cooke (1853–1934), a patron of the arts in Honolulu and founder of the Honolulu Museum of Art. His father was Charles Montague Cooke (1849–1909), co-founder of the Bank of Hawaii and benefactor of educational institutions such as Kamehameha Schools, Punahou School, and the Waikiki Aquarium. His grandfather Amos Starr Cooke (1810–1871) founded Castle & Cooke.

Cooke graduated from Punahou School in 1893, and Yale University, with a Bachelor of Arts in 1897 and a Ph.D. in 1901. He married Eliza Lefferts (1880–1970) from Flatbush, New York on April 25, 1901. They traveled through Europe before returning to Hawaii. They built a grand estate in Manoa Valley, the Charles Montague Cooke Jr. House, also known as Kualiʻi, which is on the U.S. National Register of Historic Places listings in Oahu. They had two children: Carolene Alexander Cooke (1905–1987) and Charles Montague Cooke III (1907–1952).

Unlike his father and younger brothers such as Clarence Hyde Cooke who became financiers, his interests were in the field of malacology, the study of molluscs. His cousin Annie Montague Alexander (1867–1950) also became a scientist. From 1902 he was a curator of the Bernice P. Bishop Museum collection of Pulmonata (snails) in Honolulu. In 1905 he bought the extensive collection of shells from early evolution scientist John Thomas Gulick.

Cooke led the museum's Mangarevan Expedition in 1934. He worked with Henry Augustus Pilsbry to identify species of snails in the Hawaiian Islands. He took several expeditions with Kenneth Emory through the South Pacific.

He directed the Cooke Foundation (created by his parents) from 1920 to 1948. From November 13, 1909, to April 30, 1914, he was on the board of regents of the University of Hawaii (then known as the College of Hawaii). From February 4, 1911, to July 1, 1913, he was on the Honolulu Parks Commission, and from July 1919 to June 1920 the Fish and Game Commission.

The University of Hawaii granted him an honorary doctorate in 1936. A street near the museum was named Monte Cooke Place for him, at 21°19′57″N 157°52′1″W.

He died October 29, 1948, and was buried at the Mission Houses Cemetery near Kawaiahaʻo Church. His assistant Yoshio Kondō became the new curator at the Bishop Museum.

== Works ==
- Charles Montague Cooke Jr. (1902). "The Hawaiian hepaticae of the tribe Tirgonanthae". Transactions of the Connecticut Academy of Arts and Sciences. Vol. 12. pp. 1–44. Ph.D. dissertation
- Alpheus Hyatt and Henry Augustus Pilsbry. 1911. Manual of Conchology. Second series: Pulmonata. Volume 21. Achatinellidae (Amastrinae). Leptachatina by C. Montague Cooke. (The volume was published after Hyatt's death in 1902.) (Amastridae is now considered to be a sole family.)
- 1912–1914. Manual of Conchology. Second series: Pulmonata. Volume 22. Achatinellidae by Henry A. Pilsbry assisted by C. Montague Cooke. Genealogy and migrations of the Achatinellidae by Alpheus Hyatt.
- Henry A. Pilsbry & C. Montague Cooke. 1915–1916. Manual of Conchology. Second series: Pulmonata. Volume 23. Appendix to Amastridae. Tornatellinidae. Index, vols. XXI–XXIII.
- H. A. Pilsbry & Cooke C. M. 1918–1920 Manual of Conchology. Second series: Pulmonata. Volume 25. Pupillidae (Gastrocoptinae, Vertigininae). Philadelphia.
- C. M. Cooke & Henry Edward Crampton (1930) "New species of Partula". B. P. Bishop. Mus. Occ. Papers 9: 3–5.

== Family tree ==
Rice–Cooke family tree

William Harrison Rice (1813–1862)	Mary Sophia Hyde (1816–1911)	Amos Starr Cooke (1810–1871)	Juliette Montague (1812–1896)
Paul Isenberg (1837–1903)	Maria Rice (1842–1867)	William Hyde Rice (1846–1924)	Anna Rice (1853–1934)	C. M. Cooke (1849–1909)
D. Paul R. Isenberg (1866–1919)	Charles A. Rice (1876–1899)	Harold Rice (1883–1962)	C. M. Cooke Jr. (1874–1948)	Clarence Hyde Cooke (1876–1944)	George Paul Cooke (1882-1960)
Dora Jane Cole (1917–1988)	Juliet Rice Wichman (1901–1987)	Harold Thomas Kay (1896–1976)	Anna Frances Cooke (1903–1956)	Francis Judd Cooke (1910–1995)
Alan Cooke Kay (1932–2024)
