= Francis Judd Cooke =

American classical composer

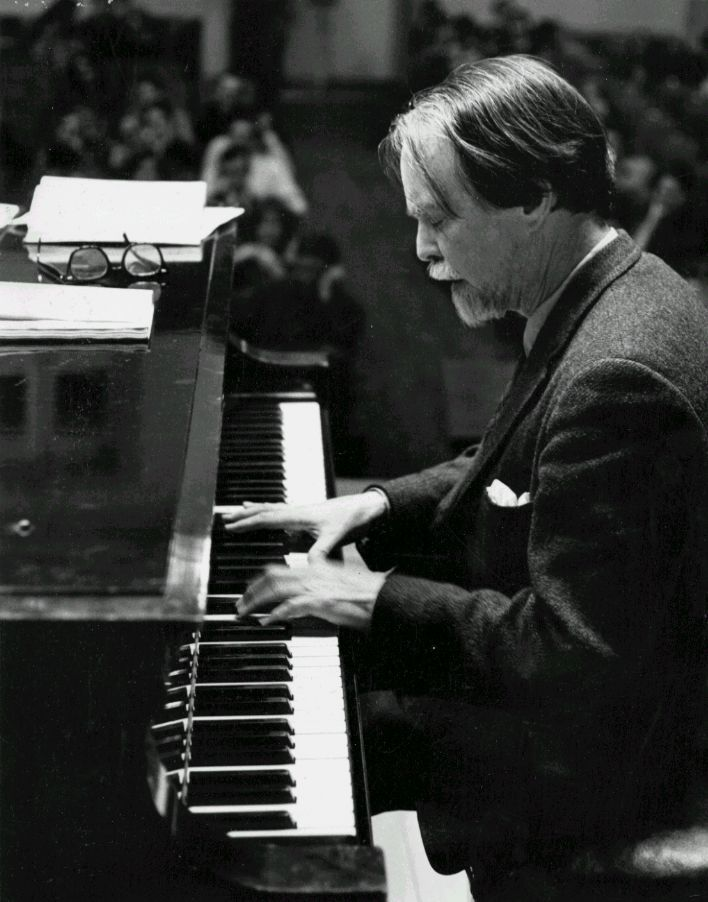
- Francis Judd Cooke at New England Conservatory of Music
- Born: December 28, 1910; Honolulu, Hawaii
- Died: May 18, 1995 (aged 84); Lexington, Massachusetts
- Parents: George Paul Cooke (father); Sophie Boyd Judd (mother)

Francis Judd Cooke (December 28, 1910 – May 18, 1995) was an American composer, organist, cellist, pianist, conductor, choir director, and professor.

== Life ==
Cooke was born December 28, 1910, in Honolulu, Hawaii, to a family of New England missionaries turned cattle ranchers. He was the great grandson of Gerrit P. Judd, the first doctor to reside in Hawaii, and grandson of Albert Francis Judd, Chief Justice of the Supreme Court of Hawaii. His mother was Sophie Boyd Judd, and father was George Paul Cooke, grandson of Amos Starr Cooke and Juliette Montague Cooke, founders of the Royal School of Hawaii.

Cooke began composing at an early age and his first serious pieces date from age 14. He received a B.A. in music from Yale University in 1933, where he was a member of Skull and Bones. He then studied for two years with Charles Martin Loeffler in Medfield, Massachusetts. In 1935 he went to Scotland to study with Donald Francis Tovey at the University of Edinburgh, receiving a Mus. Bac. (Bachelor of Music) degree with First Class Honours in 1938. While studying in Scotland he met and married violist May Ludwig. They settled in Lexington, Massachusetts, where they raised six children.

In 1939 Cooke began teaching at the New England Conservatory of Music, at the request of the Conservatory's then-director, Quincy Porter. His notable students there included John Bavicchi, Sarah Caldwell, Héctor Campos-Parsi, Stephen Casale, Robert Ceely, Robert Cogan, Lyle Davidson, Halim El-Dabh, David Epstein, Ercolino Ferretti, William Hibbard, Billy Jim Layton, Ruth Lomon, Kenneth Peacock, Lila Pradell, Richard Ronsheim, Ernie Stires, Albert Tepper, Ivana Marburger Themmen, and Luise Vosgerchian. He retired in 1970.

He also taught at Yale University in 1959–1960 and at Wellesley College from 1973 to 1979.

A prolific composer, Cooke wrote a great number of choral and orchestral works, as well as chamber works. One CD of his music, entitled The Warsaw Recordings (which he did not live to hear), performed by the Warsaw Philharmonic under Jerzy Swoboda, has been released.

In 1974 he completed a music textbook entitled Sixteenth-Century Vocal Polyphony. In the same year he was awarded an honorary Doctorate of Music from the New England Conservatory.

Cooke suffered a stroke in 1981, hampering his organ playing and choir directing, and he turned to composing full-time during the last 14 years of his life. On May 18, 1995, at the age of 84, he died in his sleep at his home in Lexington, Massachusetts, where he had lived for 51 years. He had completed that morning an arrangement for wind quintet of some music from Hector Berlioz's opera Les Troyens (titled "Dolce assai" after Berlioz's expressive marking), which was performed at his memorial service the following week at Lexington's First Parish Church (Unitarian), where he had served as organist and choirmaster from 1955 to 1981.Cooke, who greatly enjoyed poetry, used to sum up his own life with a favorite couplet from the Indian poet Rabindranath Tagore's Gitanjali:

"It was my part at the feast to play upon my instrument
And I have done all I could

== Rice-Cooke family tree ==
Rice–Cooke family tree

William Harrison Rice (1813–1862)	Mary Sophia Hyde (1816–1911)	Amos Starr Cooke (1810–1871)	Juliette Montague (1812–1896)
Paul Isenberg (1837–1903)	Maria Rice (1842–1867)	William Hyde Rice (1846–1924)	Anna Rice (1853–1934)	C. M. Cooke (1849–1909)
D. Paul R. Isenberg (1866–1919)	Charles A. Rice (1876–1899)	Harold Rice (1883–1962)	C. M. Cooke Jr. (1874–1948)	Clarence Hyde Cooke (1876–1944)	George Paul Cooke (1882-1960)
Dora Jane Cole (1917–1988)	Juliet Rice Wichman (1901–1987)	Harold Thomas Kay (1896–1976)	Anna Frances Cooke (1903–1956)	Francis Judd Cooke (1910–1995)
Alan Cooke Kay (1932–2024)

== Works ==
- Review of Modal Counterpoint in the Style of the Sixteenth Century by Ernst Krenek. Journal of Music Theory, vol. 4, no. 1 (April 1960), pp. 112–116.
