= Juliette Montague Cooke =

American Hawaii missionary teacher (1812–1896)

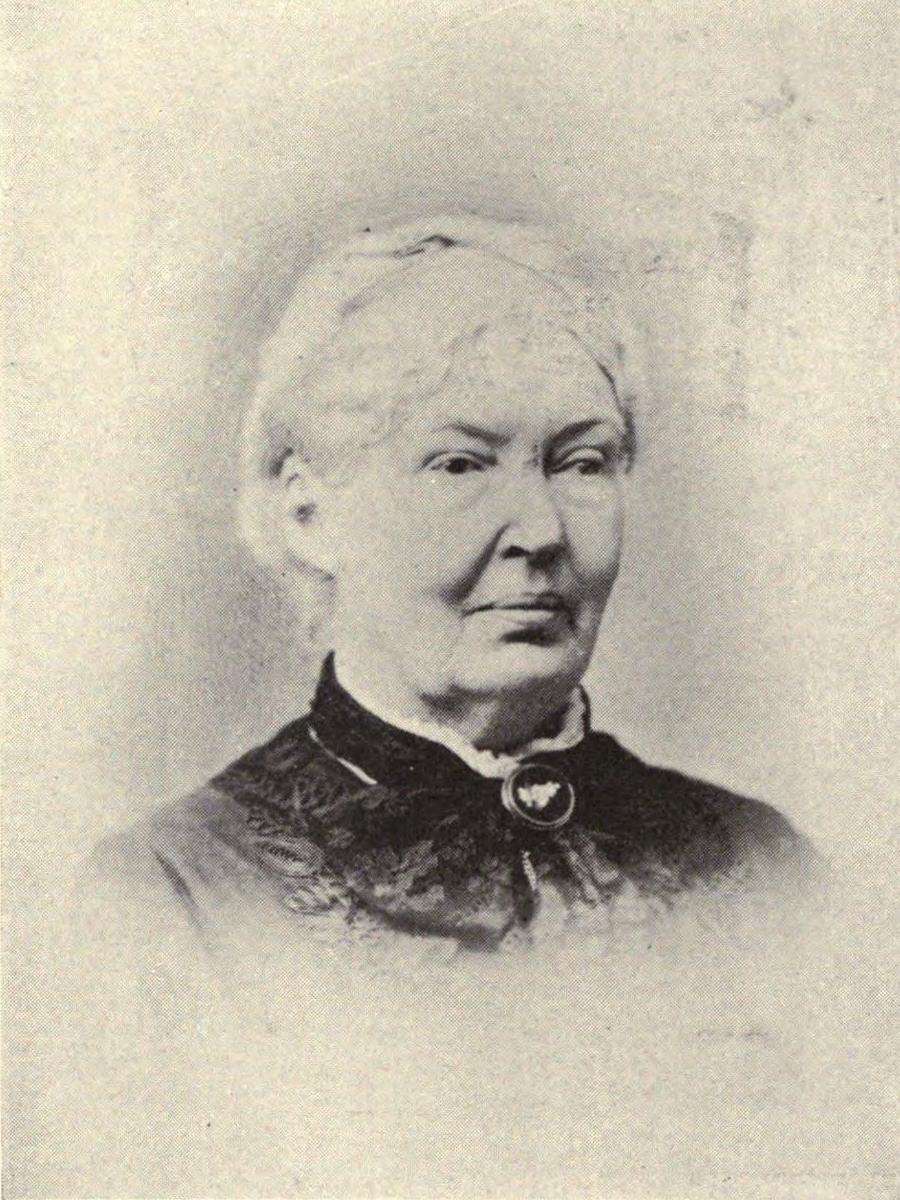
Juliette Montague Cooke, 1876

Juliette Montague Cooke (March 10, 1812 – August 11, 1896), known as "Mother Cooke", was an American teacher, a member of the Eighth Company of missionaries sent by the American Board of Commissioners for Foreign Missions (ABCFM) to the Hawaiian Islands.

== Early life ==
Juliette Montague was born in Sunderland, Massachusetts, the daughter of Caleb Montague and Martha Warner Montague. She attended school in Amherst, Massachusetts, and sat in on lectures at Amherst College as one of the first women permitted to do so. She taught school at Ipswich, Massachusetts as a young woman, and was described as a "good tailoress and dressmaker" in one of her recommendation letters for mission work.

== Mission work ==
Juliette Montague Cooke went to Hawaii as a new bride in 1836 (landed in 1837), and taught native Hawaiian children at the Chiefs' Children's School in Honolulu. Because she was the school's matron, "Mother Cooke" cared for the children of chiefs beyond their academic needs. Her charges included four kings and two queens Emma and Liliuokalani. The wedding of Bernice Pauahi and Charles Reed Bishop took place in the Cookes' home.

Cooke, like many teachers of her day, taught music and used singing in the classroom. The musical accomplishments of her royal students are counted among her contributions to Hawaiian culture. The music building at Punahou School, Montague Hall, is named for Juliette Montague Cooke and her daughter, Juliette Montague Cooke Atherton.

== Personal life and legacy ==
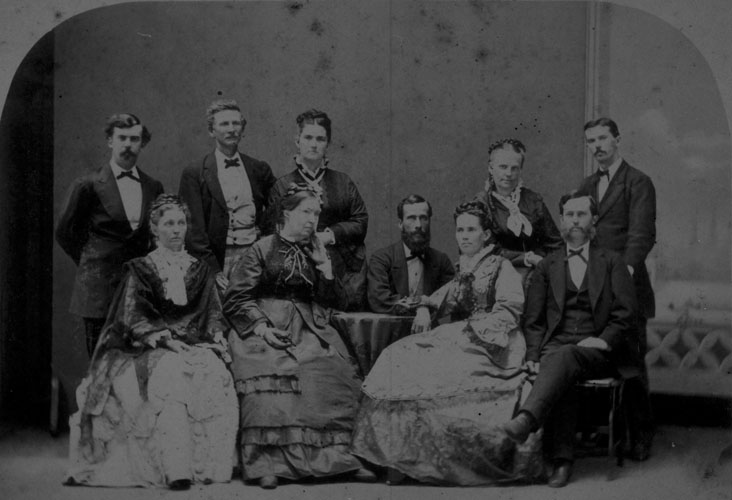
Juliette Montague Cooke and family, about 1874, N-0676, Mission Houses Museum Archives

Juliette Montague married Amos Starr Cooke in 1836. They had seven children together, born between 1838 and 1856, including financier Charles Montague Cooke. She was widowed when Amos Starr Cooke died in 1871. She died in 1896, aged 84 years, in Honolulu. Her grandchildren included malacologist Charles Montague Cooke Jr., philanthropist Mary Atherton Richards, and financier Clarence Hyde Cooke. Her great-grandchildren included musician Francis Judd Cooke. Judge Alan Cooke Kay is one of the living descendants of Juliette Montague Cooke.

Her granddaughter Mary Atherton Richards wrote a biography of the Cookes and the Chief's Children's School, first published in 1937. Juliette Montague Cooke's surviving letters and journals are still valued as a source on nineteenth-century life in Honolulu.

== Family tree ==
Rice–Cooke family tree

William Harrison Rice (1813–1862)	Mary Sophia Hyde (1816–1911)	Amos Starr Cooke (1810–1871)	Juliette Montague (1812–1896)
Paul Isenberg (1837–1903)	Maria Rice (1842–1867)	William Hyde Rice (1846–1924)	Anna Rice (1853–1934)	C. M. Cooke (1849–1909)
D. Paul R. Isenberg (1866–1919)	Charles A. Rice (1876–1899)	Harold Rice (1883–1962)	C. M. Cooke Jr. (1874–1948)	Clarence Hyde Cooke (1876–1944)	George Paul Cooke (1882-1960)
Dora Jane Cole (1917–1988)	Juliet Rice Wichman (1901–1987)	Harold Thomas Kay (1896–1976)	Anna Frances Cooke (1903–1956)	Francis Judd Cooke (1910–1995)
Alan Cooke Kay (1932–2024)
