= Charles Montague Cooke =

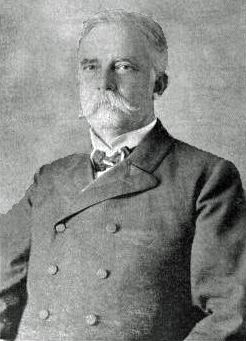
- c. 1909
- Born: May 6, 1849; Honolulu, Hawaii
- Died: August 27, 1909 (aged 60)
- Occupation: Businessman
- Spouse: Anna Charlotte Rice
- Children: 8
- Parent(s): Amos Starr Cooke; Juliette Montague

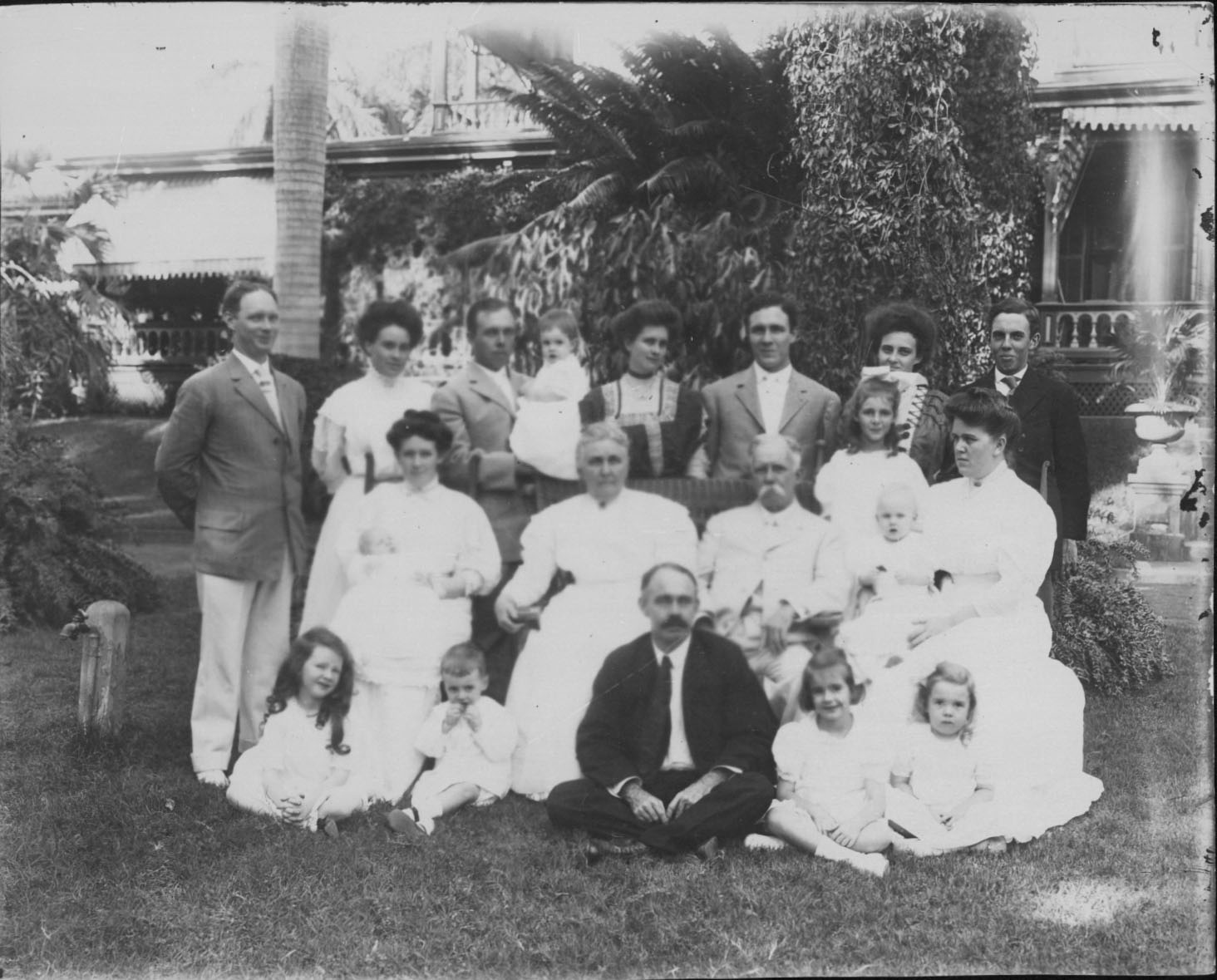
The Cooke family

Charles Montague Cooke (May 6, 1849 – August 27, 1909) was a businessman during the Kingdom of Hawaii, Republic of Hawaii, and Territory of Hawaii.

== Life ==
Charles Montague Cooke was born May 6, 1849, in Honolulu, Hawaii. His father was Amos Starr Cooke co-founder of Castle & Cooke. His mother Juliette Montague Cooke was the teacher of future leaders of the Kingdom of Hawaii at the Royal School. He was educated at Punahou School and Amherst Agricultural College where he roomed with friend William Owen Smith. In 1871, Cooke worked as a clerk for his father's firm. He moved up to head bookkeeper. Castle & Cooke was one of the "Big Five" corporations that dominated the economy of the Territory of Hawaii.

He married Anna Charlotte Rice (1853–1934) on April 30, 1874. In 1877 he became business partners with Joshua G. Dickson and Robert Lewers importing lumber and hardware. After Dickson died in July 1880, the firm became Lewers & Cooke. He was an investor in several sugar plantations in Hawaii, which became more profitable after the Reciprocity Treaty of 1875 removed tariffs.

On January 18, 1893, immediately after the Overthrow of the Kingdom of Hawaii, he was appointed to an advisory council for the Provisional Government of Hawaii. On February 1 he was sent as a representative to Washington, D.C., in an unsuccessful attempt to have the United States annex the islands. He was a founder in 1893 of the Bank of Hawaii with Peter Cushman Jones and Joseph Ballard Atherton (his brother-in-law).

He moved to California expecting to retire in 1894, but returned and became Bank of Hawaii president in September 1898 after the death of Jones. In 1899 he also became president of C. Brewer & Co., another of the Big Five (Hawaii). Bernice Pauahi Bishop appointed him as one of the first trustees of the Kamehameha Schools, known then as the Bishop Estate. He served on its board from 1884 to 1897. In 1904 he founded the Waikiki Aquarium, and in 1909 donated funds for the library at Punahou School. He kept his businesses intact through the Panic of 1907.

Their children were:

1. Charles Montague Cooke, Jr. was born December 20, 1874, became a scientist, and died October 29, 1948.
2. Clarence Hyde Cooke (1876–1944) took over as president of the Bank of Hawaii. Clarence 's grandson Alan Cooke Kay by his daughter Anna Frances Cooke (1903–1956) is a former District Judge, former Chief Judge, and now Senior Judge of the United States District Court for the District of Hawaii, who presided over two federal civil rights lawsuits against Kamehameha Schools, Equal Employment Opportunity Commission v. Kamehameha Schools/Bishop Estate and John Doe v. Kamehameha, in which he both ruled in favor of Kamehameha.
3. William Harrison Rice Cooke (namesake of his father-in-law William Harrison Rice) was born in 1878 but died young in 1880.
4. George Paul Cooke was born December 2, 1881, married Sophie Boyd Judd (1883–1966), granddaughter of missionary Gerrit P. Judd, they had eight children, one of their sons was musician Francis Judd Cooke (1910–1995). He died in 1960. Their great-grandson was baseball player Steve Cooke (Stephen Montague Cooke III).
5. Richard Alexander Cooke was born January 24, 1884, married Dagmar Sorenseon in 1907, was executive at Bank of Hawaii and C. Brewer, and died in 1941. Their daughter-in-law Lorraine (Day) Cooke founded La Pietra school for girls.
6. Alice Theodora Cooke (1887–1968) married Philip Edmunds Spalding (1889–1968), for whom a building is named at the University of Hawaii at Manoa. Their home is now the Honolulu Museum of Art Spalding House (formerly The Contemporary Museum, Honolulu).
7. Theodore Atherton Cooke (1891–1973) married Muriel Elizabeth Howatt (1891–1969).
8. Dorothea Cooke (twin of Theodore) was born August 23, 1891, but died young February 26, 1892.

He died August 27, 1909, after a second stroke. Most of the family is buried at the Mission Houses Cemetery near Kawaiahaʻo Church. A house he had built on Thomas Square in 1882 became the Honolulu Museum of Art. Anna Rice Cooke also left 4500 pieces of artwork they had collected to the academy. His estate was incorporated as Charles M. Cooke, Ltd. in 1898, and dissolved and distributed to 58 shareholders in 1942. Some of the assets became the Charles M. and Anna C. Cooke Trust, which became a charitable foundation in 1971. In 1980, it became the Cooke Foundation. The Hawaii Community Foundation continues to administer grants.

== Family tree ==
Rice–Cooke family tree

William Harrison Rice (1813–1862)	Mary Sophia Hyde (1816–1911)	Amos Starr Cooke (1810–1871)	Juliette Montague (1812–1896)
Paul Isenberg (1837–1903)	Maria Rice (1842–1867)	William Hyde Rice (1846–1924)	Anna Rice (1853–1934)	C. M. Cooke (1849–1909)
D. Paul R. Isenberg (1866–1919)	Charles A. Rice (1876–1899)	Harold Rice (1883–1962)	C. M. Cooke Jr. (1874–1948)	Clarence Hyde Cooke (1876–1944)	George Paul Cooke (1882-1960)
Dora Jane Cole (1917–1988)	Juliet Rice Wichman (1901–1987)	Harold Thomas Kay (1896–1976)	Anna Frances Cooke (1903–1956)	Francis Judd Cooke (1910–1995)
Alan Cooke Kay (1932–2024)
