= Amos Starr Cooke =

American educator and businessman (1810–1871)

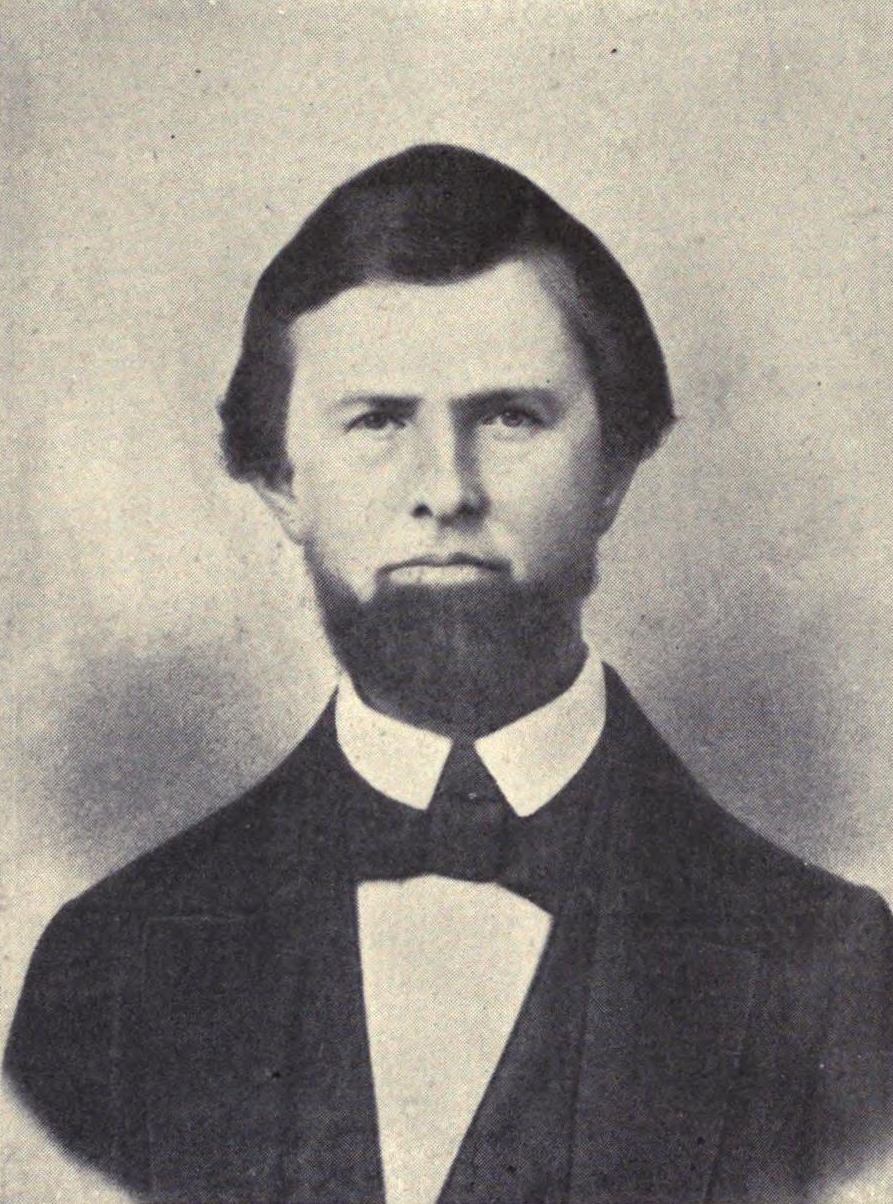
- c. 1859
- Born: December 1, 1810; Danbury, Connecticut
- Died: March 20, 1871 (aged 60); Honolulu, Hawaii
- Occupations: Educator, Businessman
- Spouse: Juliette Montague
- Children: 7
- Parent(s): Joseph Platt Cooke Jr. Annis Starr

Amos Starr Cooke (December 1, 1810 – March 20, 1871) was an American educator and businessman in the Kingdom of Hawaii. He was patriarch of a family that influenced Hawaii during the 20th century.

== Life ==
Amos Starr Cooke was born in Danbury, Connecticut, December 1, 1810. His father was Joseph Platt Cooke Jr. (1760–1841) and mother was Annis Starr (died 1813). His grandfather Joseph Platt Cooke (1730–1816) served in the American Revolutionary War. Juliette Montague was born in Sunderland, Massachusetts, March 10, 1812. Her father was Caleb Montague (1781–1825) and mother Martha Warner. They were married November 27, 1836, and in less than a month in the 8th company from the American Board of Commissioners for Foreign Missions to Hawaii. They sailed from Boston December 14, 1836, on the Mary Frazier and reached Honolulu on April 9, 1837.

The Cookes were put in charge of the Chiefs' Children's School. King Kamehameha III selected as students those who would be eligible for the throne based on their family background. Instruction was in English, and all five of the next ruling monarchs were students at the school. A complex of buildings was built to house the Cookes and students in 1840 as it became a boarding school. In 1846 it was renamed the Royal School, and became funded by the government.

In 1849 Cooke worked for Samuel Northrup Castle who had been a shipmate on the Mary Frazier as secular supply agent for the mission. As the American Board reduced funding for the Hawaii stations, he co-founded Castle & Cooke as a private company in June 1851. Edward Griffin Beckwith (1826–1909) became the next principal of the Royal School, as it opened to students of all races.

The business started as a general store, and continued as supply agents to the mission. Their store house is part of the Mission Houses Museum. Cooke made one trip to supply mission stations in the Marshall Islands and Gilbert Islands. In 1858 Cooke became a partner in the Haʻikū Sugar Company on the island of Maui. During the American Civil War in the 1860s, the company became an agent for selling sugar from the sugar plantations in Hawaii to the western United States. However, Cooke's health declined and he turned over his duties to Joseph Ballard Atherton who had started as a clerk in 1859.

Cooke died in Honolulu, March 20, 1871. The company went on to be one of the "Big Five" corporations that dominated the economy of the Territory of Hawaii. Their 7 children were:

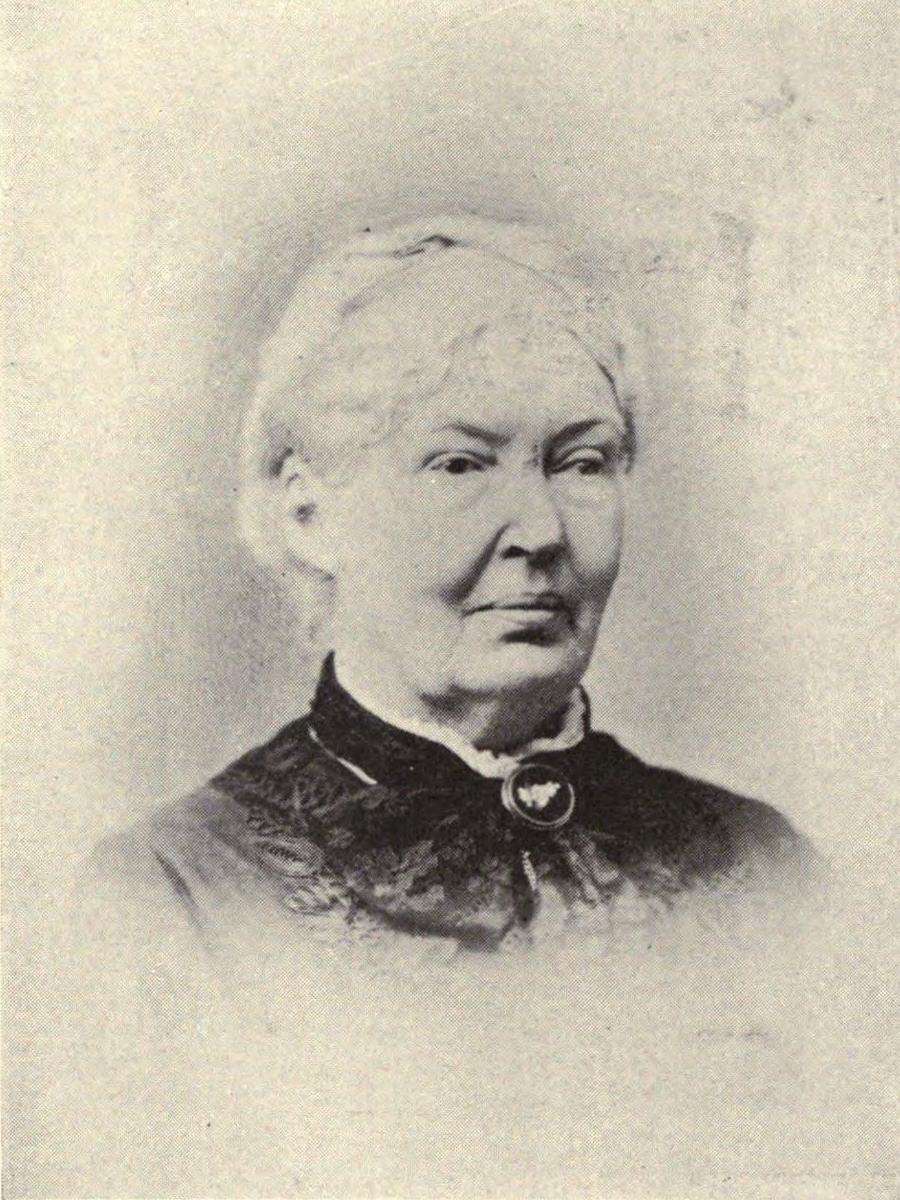
Juliette Montague Cooke in 1876

1. Joseph Platt Cooke was born June 15, 1838, married Harriet Emily Wilder (1842–1904), sister of Samuel Gardner Wilder, and died August 29, 1879. Their son also named Joseph Platt Cooke (1870–1918) married Maud Mansfield Baldwin (1872–1961), daughter of Henry Perrine Baldwin, co-founder of Alexander & Baldwin.
2. Martha Eliza Cooke was born November 21, 1840, married Samuel Thomas Alexander (1836–1904), the other co-founder of Alexander & Baldwin. She died July 6, 1918.
3. Juliette Montague Cooke was born August 21, 1843, married Joseph Ballard Atherton (1837–1903) in 1865 and died August 25, 1921. Their daughter Mary Atherton Richards (1869–1951) wrote several histories of the family.
4. Mary Annis Cooke was born November 6, 1846, married Charles Turner (1845–1894), and died in 1920.
5. Charles Montague Cooke was born May 6, 1849, married Anna Charlotte Rice (1853–1934) on April 30, 1874. He became president of the Bank of Hawaii and C. Brewer & Co. Their children included scientist Charles Montague Cooke Jr. (1874–1948) and businessman Clarence Hyde Cooke (1876–1944). Son George Paul Cooke married the granddaughter of missionary Gerrit P. Judd, and their son was musician Francis Judd Cooke (1910–1995). He died in 1909.
6. Amos Francis "Frank" Cooke was born December 23, 1852, married Lilanet "Lulu" Lydgate (1856–1946) and died in 1931.
7. Clarence Warren Cooke was born April 4, 1856, married Clara Lydia Moseley (1857–1941) and died March 4, 1880.

His wife Juliette Cooke died on August 11, 1896. Most of the family is buried at the Mission Houses Cemetery near Kawaiahaʻo Church.

== Family tree ==
Rice–Cooke family tree

William Harrison Rice (1813–1862)	Mary Sophia Hyde (1816–1911)	Amos Starr Cooke (1810–1871)	Juliette Montague (1812–1896)
Paul Isenberg (1837–1903)	Maria Rice (1842–1867)	William Hyde Rice (1846–1924)	Anna Rice (1853–1934)	C. M. Cooke (1849–1909)
D. Paul R. Isenberg (1866–1919)	Charles A. Rice (1876–1899)	Harold Rice (1883–1962)	C. M. Cooke Jr. (1874–1948)	Clarence Hyde Cooke (1876–1944)	George Paul Cooke (1882-1960)
Dora Jane Cole (1917–1988)	Juliet Rice Wichman (1901–1987)	Harold Thomas Kay (1896–1976)	Anna Frances Cooke (1903–1956)	Francis Judd Cooke (1910–1995)
Alan Cooke Kay (1932–2024)
