= Anna Rice Cooke =

Anna Charlotte (Rice) Cooke
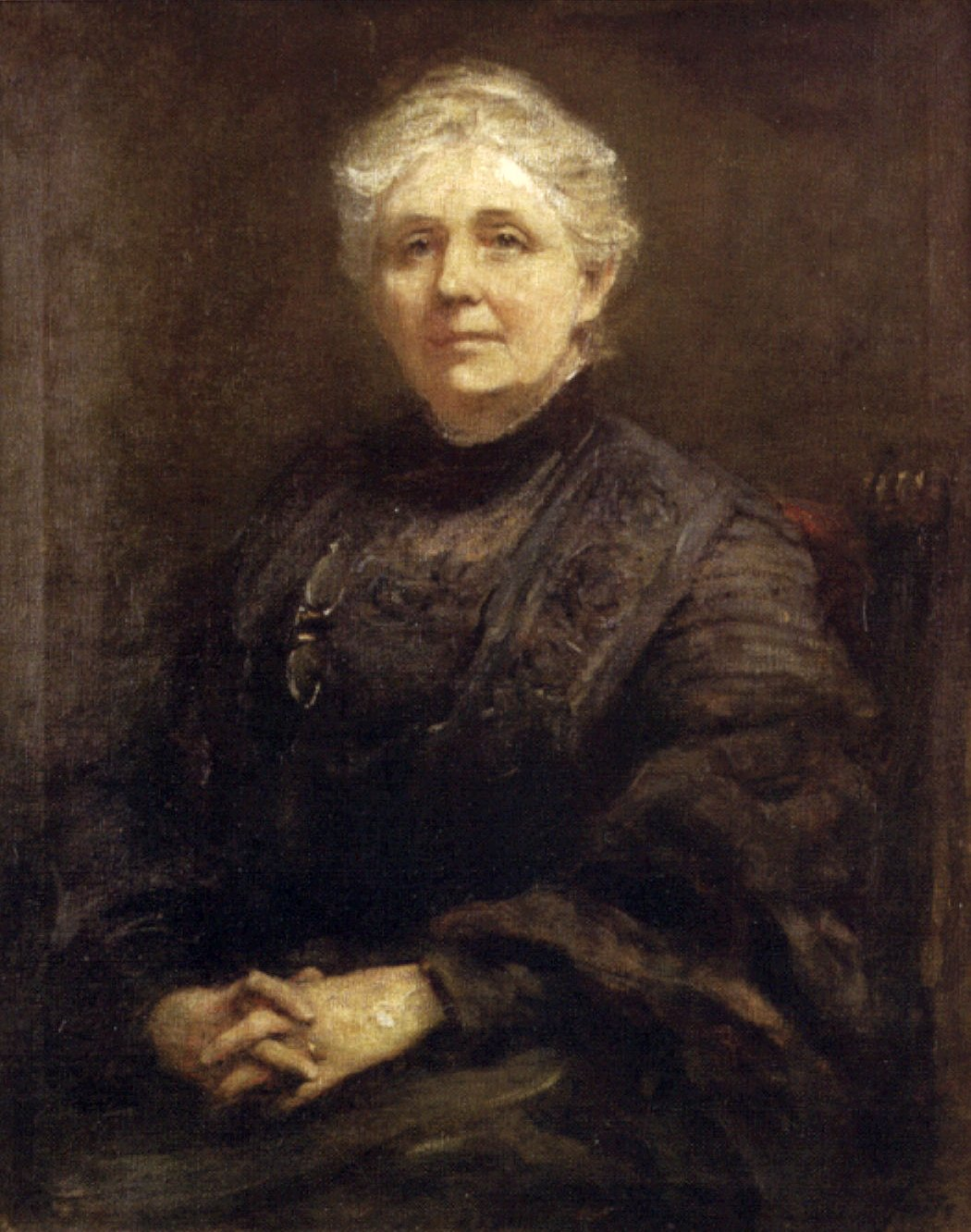
- Painting by Frederic Yates (1854–1919), 1910, Honolulu Museum of Art
- Born: September 5, 1853
- Died: August 8, 1934 (aged 80); Honolulu, Hawaii
- Spouse: Charles Montague Cooke
- Children: Charles Montague Jr. Clarence H. George P. Richard A. Alice T. Theodore A.

Anna Rice Cooke (September 5, 1853 – August 8, 1934) was a patron of the arts and the founder of the Honolulu Museum of Art.

== Biography ==
Anna Charlotte Rice was born on September 5, 1853, into a prominent missionary family on Oahu, Hawaii. Her father was teacher William Harrison Rice (1813–1863), and her mother was Mary Sophia Hyde. Anna grew up on the island of Kauaʻi. She attended Punahou School (then called Oahu College) 1867–1868, and Mills College 1871–1872. In 1874, she married Charles Montague Cooke, a successful businessman, and the two eventually settled in Honolulu. Ones of her sons was Charles Montague Cooke Jr. (1874–1948), an American zoologist. Other children were Clarence H. Cooke, George P. Cooke, Richard A. Cooke, Alice T. Cooke and Theodore A. Cooke.

In 1882, the Cookes built a home on Beretania Street, across from Thomas Square Park. In the time, they had unobstructed views of Diamond Head and Punahou School from their second-story windows. As Cooke's career prospered, they began to gather their own private fine art collection. Anna's first additions were "parlor pieces" that graced their Beretania Street home. She frequented the shop of furniture maker Yeun Kwock Fong Inn who often had Chinese ceramics and textile pieces sent from his brother in China. Fong Inn eventually became one of Honolulu's leading art importers. Anna was an advocate for local artists, especially Charles W. Bartlett. She hosted exhibitions in her home and introduced artists to her wealthy friends.

== Honolulu Academy of Arts ==
The Cookes' art collection outgrew their own home and the homes of their children. In 1920, she and her daughter Alice (Mrs. Phillip Spalding), her daughter-in-law Dagmar (Mrs. Richard Cooke), and Catharine E. B. Cox (Mrs. Isaac Cox), an art and drama teacher, began to catalogue and research the collection with the intent to display the items in a museum for the children of Hawaii. With little formal training, these women obtained a charter for the museum from the Territory of Hawaii in 1922, while continuing to catalogue each art treasure in the collection. In 1924, Cooke hired the painter Frank Montague Moore as the first director of the Honolulu Museum of Art. From the beginning, she wanted a museum that reflected the unique attributes of Hawaii's multi-cultural make-up.

The Cookes donated their Beretania Street home for the museum, along with an endowment of $25,000 and several thousand works of art. Their family home was torn down to make way for the new museum. New York architect Bertram Goodhue designed the plans for a classic Hawaiian-style building with the mountains as a backdrop and colorful blossoming trees, flowers, and shrubs complementing the simple off-white exteriors and tiled roofs. Goodhue died before the project was completed. Stepping in to finish the job was Hardie Phillip. Over the years, this unique style has been imitated in many buildings throughout the state.

On April 8, 1927, the Honolulu Museum of Art opened. On August 8, 1934, Cooke died quietly in her home.

== Family tree ==
Rice–Cooke family tree

William Harrison Rice (1813–1862)	Mary Sophia Hyde (1816–1911)	Amos Starr Cooke (1810–1871)	Juliette Montague (1812–1896)
Paul Isenberg (1837–1903)	Maria Rice (1842–1867)	William Hyde Rice (1846–1924)	Anna Rice (1853–1934)	C. M. Cooke (1849–1909)
D. Paul R. Isenberg (1866–1919)	Charles A. Rice (1876–1899)	Harold Rice (1883–1962)	C. M. Cooke Jr. (1874–1948)	Clarence Hyde Cooke (1876–1944)	George Paul Cooke (1882-1960)
Dora Jane Cole (1917–1988)	Juliet Rice Wichman (1901–1987)	Harold Thomas Kay (1896–1976)	Anna Frances Cooke (1903–1956)	Francis Judd Cooke (1910–1995)
Alan Cooke Kay (1932–2024)
