= William Hyde Rice =

Hawaiian politician (1846–1924)

The Honorable William Hyde Rice
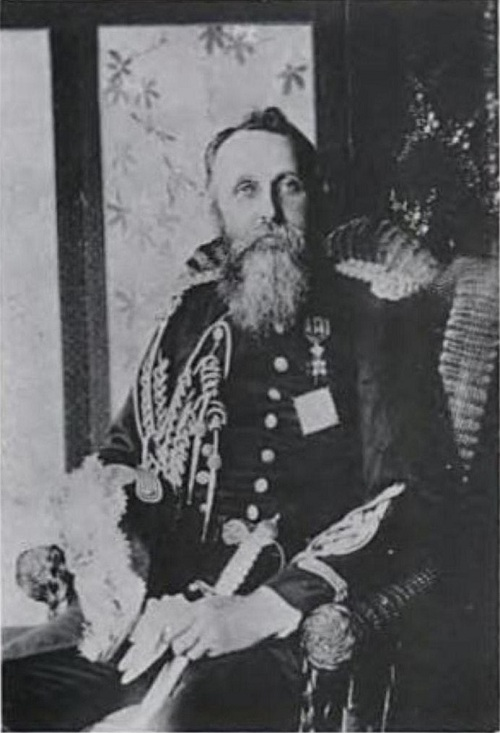
- William Hyde Rice in his uniform as Governor of Kauai

Governor of Kauai
- In office 1892–1893
- Monarch: Queen Liliʻuokalani
- Preceded by: Lanihau

Personal details
- Born: July 23, 1846 Honolulu, Oahu, Kingdom of Hawaii
- Died: June 15, 1924 (aged 77) Territory of Hawaii, United States
- Spouse: Mary Waterhouse
- Children: 8
- Occupation: Businessman, politician

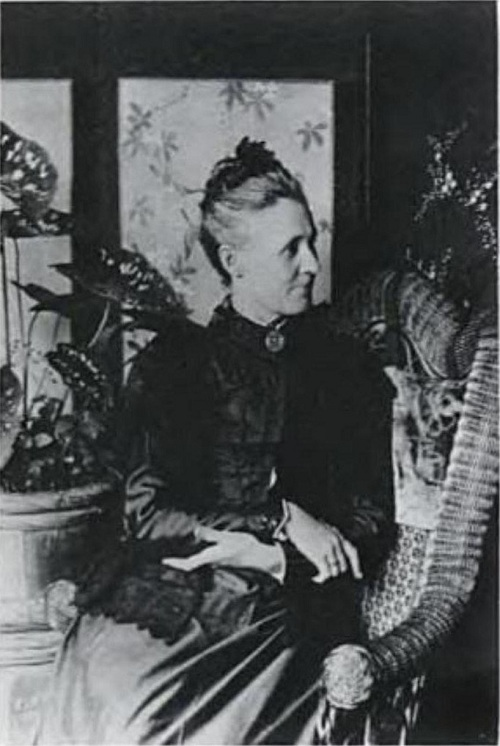
Mary Waterhouse Rice

William Hyde Rice (July 23, 1846 – June 15, 1924) was a businessman and politician who served in the Kingdom of Hawaii, during the Kingdom's Overthrow, and in the following Republic of Hawaii and Territory of Hawaii governments. He collected and published legends of Hawaiian mythology.

== Life ==
William Hyde Rice was born at Honolulu, Hawaii on July 23, 1846. His father was William Harrison Rice (1813–1862), and mother was Mary Sophia Hyde; both were Protestant missionary teachers at Oahu College. At an early age Rice began to amass knowledge of Hawaiian culture, myths and legends—along with his fortune. Like his father, he was a student of Hawaiian legends, especially the myth of Pele.

In 1854 the family moved to Līhuʻe on the island of Kauaʻi. His father became manager of a sugarcane plantation, and in 1856, his father completed the first irrigation system for sugar for the Lihue Plantation in East Kauaʻi. He attended a boarding school at Kōloa, run by Reverend Daniel Dole. He then attended Oahu College, and Braton's College in Oakland, California. In Honolulu, on October 17, 1872, he married Mary Waterhouse (1847–1933), and had eight children:

1. Son William Henry Rice was born June 24, 1874, married Mary Agnes Girvin on June 8, 1897, managed Līhuʻe ranch, and then became deputy sheriff in 1900 and sheriff of Kauaʻi county in 1905. He died in 1945.
2. Son Charles Atwood Rice was born September 12, 1876, and married Grace Ethel King (1880–1940) on June 20, 1899. He served in the legislature of the Territory of Hawaii as representative from 1905 to 1911, and then in the Territorial Senate from 1913 through 1937. He died in 1964, and his daughter Juliet Rice Wichman (1901–1987) was co-founder of the Kauaʻi Museum.
3. Son Arthur Hyde Rice (July 25, 1878 – November 2, 1955) married 1905 to Elizabeth "Bessie" Smith Forest (1883–1969)
4. Daughter Mary Eleanor Rice (November 25, 1880 – January 22, 1923), married Walter Henry Scott (1873–1931).
5. Daughter Anna Charlotte Rice (called "Daisy") (August 5, 1882 – 1948), and married 1903 to Ralph Lyman Wilcox (1876–1913) (who inherited part of Grove Farm from uncle George Norton Wilcox and grandson of missionary David Belden Lyman).
6. Son Harold Waterhouse Rice (November 10, 1883 – June 5, 1962), attended Princeton for one year, and married Charlotte McKinney Baldwin (1884–1938) on December 7, 1907. She was daughter of Alexander & Baldwin founder Henry Perrine Baldwin. He was elected to the Territorial Senate for Maui from 1919 through 1947.
7. Son Philip de la Vergne Rice (July 22, 1886 – January 14, 1974), married 1911 to Flora Flinn Benton (1891–1971) became Chief Justice for the Territory of Hawaii.
8. Daughter Emily Dorothea Rice (September 30, 1889 – April 6, 1979) married 1910 to Leo Lloyd Sexton, MD. (1879–1966)

In 1872, 26-year-old Rice formed Kipu Plantation and Lihue Ranch, purchasing the Kipu parcel from Princess Ruth Keʻelikōlani for $3,000 to breed cattle and fine horses. His family became one of the top ten private landowners on the island.

Rice served in the Hawaiian House of Representatives from 1870 to 1872 and from 1882 to 1884, and in the Senate from 1886 to 1890. Rice helped to draw up the 1887 Constitution of the Kingdom of Hawaii (known as the "Bayonet Constitution") and was one of the 13 committeemen who forced King David Kalakaua to sign it. He was appointed the last of the Governors of Kauai in 1891 by Queen Liliʻuokalani, whom he later helped to overthrow and place under house arrest, participating in the overthrow of the Hawaiian monarchy in 1893. Rice then served his childhood friend Sanford B. Dole, son of his school-master, who was named president of the new Republic of Hawaii, in the Senate from 1895 to 1898.

Rice spoke the Hawaiian language as his first language and published a valuable collection of Hawaiian legends, a reprint of which is available online from the Bernice P. Bishop Museum's Special Publications section.

William Hyde Rice died June 15, 1924. Charles Atwood Rice took over the business at that time. Charles would serve in the legislature of the Territory of Hawaii from 1905 to 1937. Still in the Rice family, Kipu Ranch offers ranch tours to visitors.

== Family tree ==
Rice–Cooke family tree

William Harrison Rice (1813–1862) | Mary Sophia Hyde (1816–1911) | Amos Starr Cooke (1810–1871) | Juliette Montague (1812–1896)
Paul Isenberg (1837–1903) | Maria Rice (1842–1867) | William Hyde Rice (1846–1924) | Anna Rice (1853–1934) | C. M. Cooke (1849–1909)
D. Paul R. Isenberg (1866–1919) | Charles A. Rice (1876–1899) | Harold Rice (1883–1962) | C. M. Cooke Jr. (1874–1948) | Clarence Hyde Cooke (1876–1944) | George Paul Cooke (1882-1960)
Dora Jane Cole (1917–1988) | Juliet Rice Wichman (1901–1987) | Harold Thomas Kay (1896–1976) | Anna Frances Cooke (1903–1956) | Francis Judd Cooke (1910–1995)
Alan Cooke Kay (1932–2024)

== See also ==
- Sugar plantations in Hawaii

Government offices
| Vacant Title last held by Lanihau | Governor of Kauai; 1892–1893 | Position abolished |
