= Alan Cooke Kay =

American judge (1932–2024)

Alan Kay
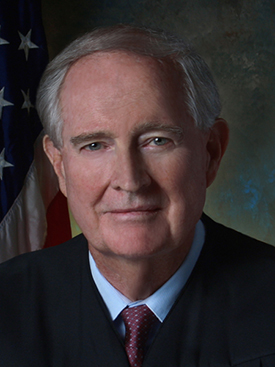

Senior Judge of the United States District Court for the District of Hawaii
- In office January 2, 2000 – July 30, 2024

Chief Judge of the United States District Court for the District of Hawaii
- In office 1991–1999
- Preceded by: Harold Fong
- Succeeded by: David Alan Ezra

Judge of the United States District Court for the District of Hawaii
- In office September 15, 1986 – January 2, 2000
- Appointed by: Ronald Reagan
- Preceded by: Seat established by 98 Stat. 333
- Succeeded by: John Michael Seabright

Personal details
- Born: July 5, 1932 Honolulu, Territory of Hawaii, U.S.
- Died: July 30, 2024 (aged 92) Honolulu, Hawaii, U.S.
- Relations: Clarence Hyde Cooke (maternal grandfather); Anna Rice Cooke (great grandmother); Charles Montague Cooke (great grandfather); William Harrison Rice (great-great grandfather); Amos Starr Cooke (great-great grandfather)
- Education: Princeton University (AB); University of California, Berkeley (LLB)

Alan Cooke Kay (July 5, 1932 – July 30, 2024) was a United States district judge of the United States District Court for the District of Hawaii.

== Education and career ==
Kay was born on July 5, 1932, in Honolulu, Hawaii. He attended Princeton University, where he received an Artium Baccalaureus degree in 1957 and the UC Berkeley School of Law where he received a Bachelor of Laws in 1960. He served as a United States Marine Corps Corporal from 1953 to 1955. He was in private practice in Honolulu from 1960 to 1986, and was director of the Legal Aid Society in Honolulu from 1968 to 1971.

=== Federal judicial service ===
Kay was nominated by Ronald Reagan on July 3, 1986, to a new seat created by 98 Stat. 333 on the United States District Court for the District of Hawaii. He was confirmed by the United States Senate on September 12, 1986, and received his commission on September 15, 1986. He served as chief judge from 1991 to 1999 and assumed senior status on January 2, 2000.

Kay presided over two federal civil rights lawsuits against Kamehameha Schools, Equal Employment Opportunity Commission v. Kamehameha Schools/Bishop Estate, 780 F. Supp. 1317 and John Doe v. Kamehameha, 295 F. Supp. 2d 1141, in which he both ruled in favor of Kamehameha.

== Personal life ==
Kay's father was Harold Thomas Kay (1896–1976) and mother was Anna Frances Cooke (1903–1956). His maternal grandfather was Clarence Hyde Cooke (1876–1944), great grandparents Anna Rice Cooke (1853–1934) and Charles Montague Cooke (1849–1909), and great-great grandfathers include William Harrison Rice (1813–1863) and Amos Starr Cooke (1810–1871). He had two children from his first wife Noel Emily Murchie, and one from his second wife Patricia Eileen Patmont.

Kay died in Honolulu on July 30, 2024, at the age of 92.

Rice–Cooke family tree

William Harrison Rice (1813–1862)	Mary Sophia Hyde (1816–1911)	Amos Starr Cooke (1810–1871)	Juliette Montague (1812–1896)
Paul Isenberg (1837–1903)	Maria Rice (1842–1867)	William Hyde Rice (1846–1924)	Anna Rice (1853–1934)	C. M. Cooke (1849–1909)
D. Paul R. Isenberg (1866–1919)	Charles A. Rice (1876–1899)	Harold Rice (1883–1962)	C. M. Cooke Jr. (1874–1948)	Clarence Hyde Cooke (1876–1944)	George Paul Cooke (1882-1960)
Dora Jane Cole (1917–1988)	Juliet Rice Wichman (1901–1987)	Harold Thomas Kay (1896–1976)	Anna Frances Cooke (1903–1956)	Francis Judd Cooke (1910–1995)
Alan Cooke Kay (1932–2024)

Notes:

Legal offices
Preceded by Seat established by 98 Stat. 333	Judge of the United States District Court for the District of Hawaii; 1986–2000	Succeeded by John Michael Seabright
Preceded by Harold Fong	Chief Judge of the United States District Court for the District of Hawaii; 1991–1999	Succeeded by David Alan Ezra
