= Lila Pradell =

American composer (1932–2024)

Lila (or Leila) Charney Pradell (15 September 1932 – 5 December 2024) was an American composer, pianist, and teacher who composed in many genres and is best remembered for her choral composition Roads Go Ever On.

== Career ==
Pradell was born in Boston to Arthur and Rose Charney. She earned a B.M. in voice and piano from Boston University and a M.M. in composition and theory from New England Conservatory, then studied at Tanglewood for two years and in France with Nadia Boulanger. She also studied with Eunice Alberts, Francis Judd Cooke, Gladys Miller, and Hermann von Schmeidel. She married David Pradell and they had three children before divorcing.

Pradell and her husband lived in Fairbanks, Alaska, for several years and taught Inuit children. After returning to Massachusetts, she taught at the All Newton Music School and in the preparatory department of New England Conservatory.

As a pianist, Pradell accompanied Newton's All City Chorus and local theatre groups, and performed at the Harvard Faculty Club. As a composer, Pradell composed for the Charles Playhouse in Boston and was the Composer-in-Residence for Newton Public Schools in Newton, Massachusetts. She founded the Boston Women's Composers Organization and created the Contemporary Music for Children Project at New England Conservatory. She belonged to the League of Women Composers and American Women Composers.

Pradell's music was published by Belwin and Hal Leonard/Shawnee Press. Manuscripts of her compositions for children were donated to The Rivers School in Weston, Massachusetts. Her compositions included:

== Multimedia ==
- One Work (card games, chorus, dance and tape)

== Opera ==
- Tom Thumb

== Orchestra ==
- Fugue
- Petite Suite Magique
- Suite for Children

== Piano ==
- Micropatterns
- Sonatina
- Suite

== Theatre ==
- Don Quixote (after Cervantes; for children with audience participation)
- The Hobbit (text by J. R. R. Tolkien; for children)

== Vocal ==
- Carousel Songs (text by Samuel Taylor Coleridge)
- "Children from Many Lands" (voice, piano and Orff instruments)
- "June" (voice and Orff instruments)
- "Prayer for Poland"
- "Psalm 23" (bass-baritone and piano)
- Roads Go Ever On (chorus; text by J. R. R. Tolkien)
- Song Cycle of Women Poets
- "Summerthing"
