= William Harrison Rice =

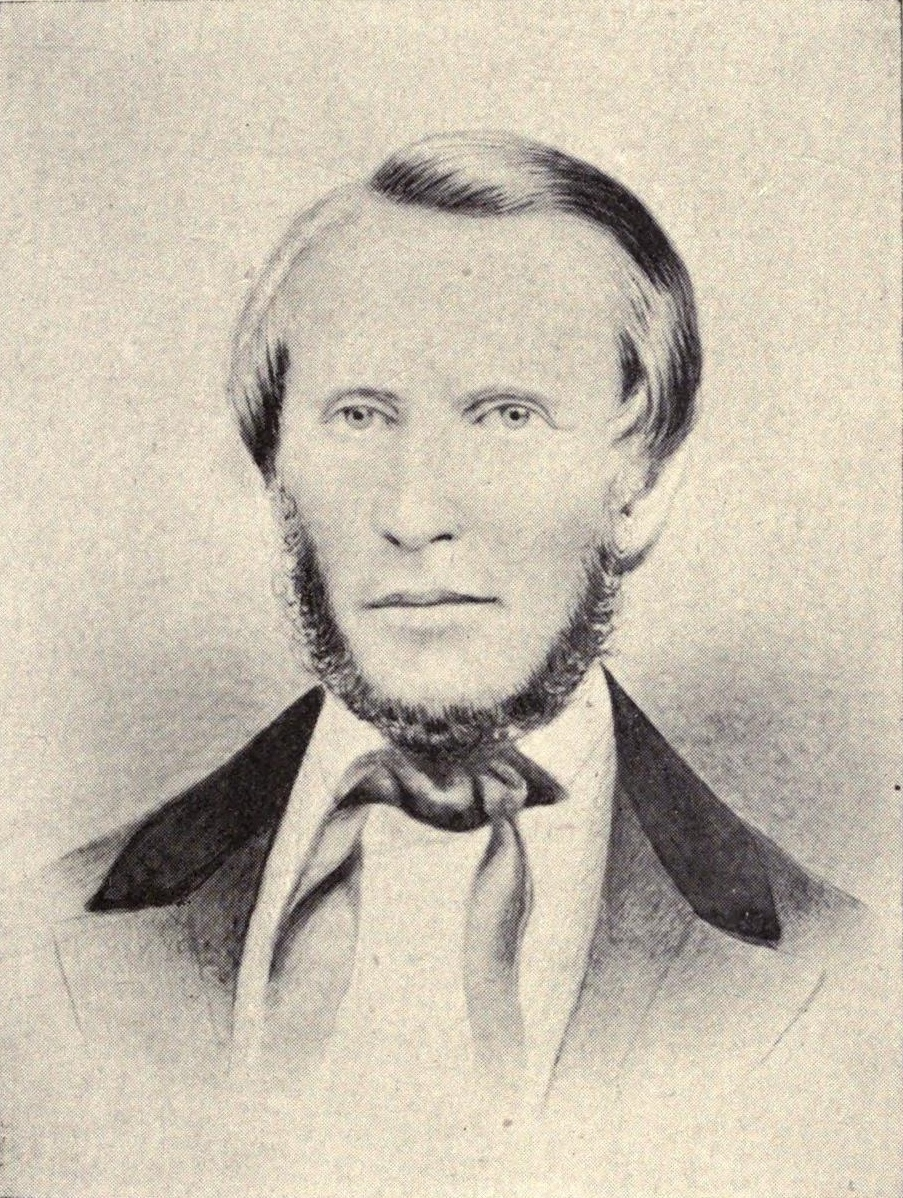
- Circa 1856
- Born: October 12, 1813; Oswego, New York
- Died: May 27, 1862 (aged 48); Līhuʻe, Kauaʻi, Hawaii
- Occupation(s): Teacher, Planter
- Known for: Punahou School
- Spouse: Mary Sophia Hyde
- Children: William Hyde Rice; Anna Charlotte Rice; Three others

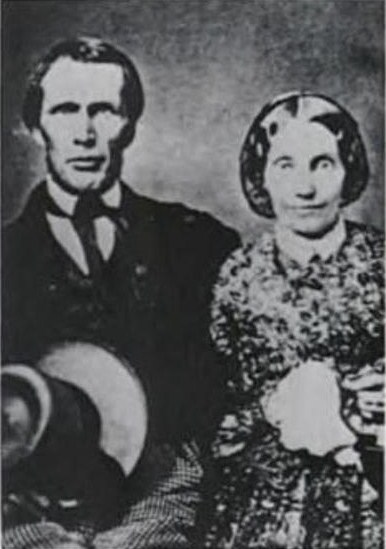
William Harrison Rice and his wife, Mary Sophia Hyde Rice.

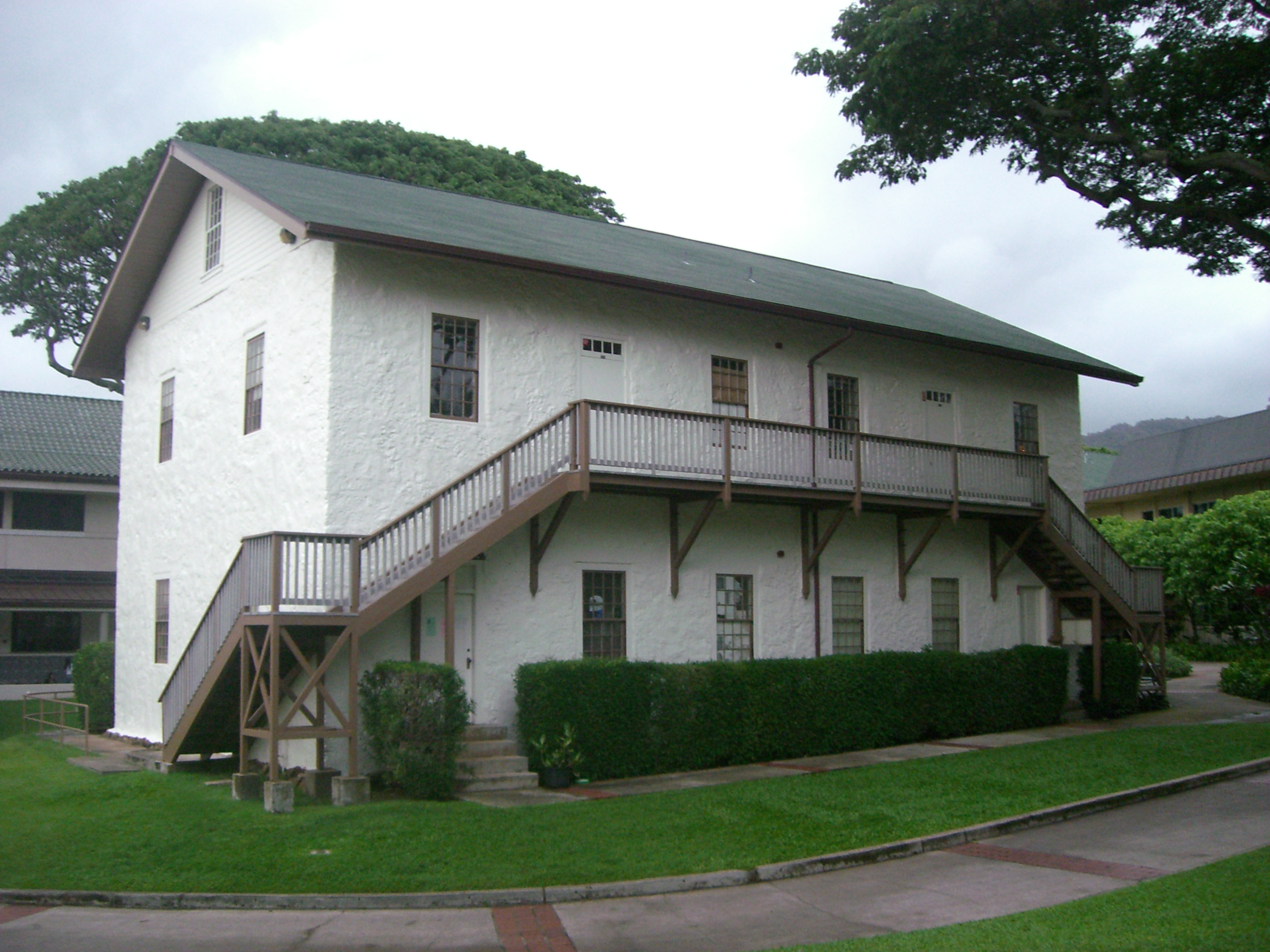
Old School Hall at Punahou School.

William Harrison Rice (October 12, 1813 – May 26, 1862) was a missionary teacher from the United States who settled in the Hawaiian Islands and managed an early sugarcane plantation.

== Life ==
William Harrison Rice was born on October 12, 1813, in Oswego, New York, on the shore of Lake Ontario. His father was Joseph Rice and mother Sally Rice. On September 29, 1840, he married Mary Sophia Hyde, who was born on October 11, 1816. Her father was Jabez Backus Hyde, a missionary to the Seneca nation in western New York State near current-day Buffalo, New York, and mother was Jerusha Aiken Hyde. Reverend Hyde performed the wedding ceremony. The Rices sailed in the ninth company of missionaries to Hawaii from the American Board of Commissioners for Foreign Missions on the ship Gloucester, leaving from Boston on November 14, 1840, and arriving to Honolulu on May 21, 1841. Also in this company were John Davis Paris, Elias Bond, and Daniel Dole. The Rice and Paris families were intending to proceed to Oregon Territory, but after being told of Indian uprisings at the Whitman Mission, decided to stay in Hawaii.

Their first posting after learning the Hawaiian language was the remote Wānanalua mission station in the Hana district, on the eastern coast of the island of Maui. Reverend Daniel Conde had founded the station in 1838, but was holding services in a traditional Hawaiian thatched building. The native Hawaiians were put to work building a stone building starting in 1842, which still stands.

In 1844, the Rice family was transferred to become the first secular teachers at Punahou School that had been founded by Dole two years before in Honolulu. One of his first tasks was to have a house constructed for his family and some boarders, known as "Rice Hall". He then supervised the building of a building now called "Old School Hall" from 1848 to 1851, largely with student labor.

In 1854, they resigned from the school and moved to the island of Kauaʻi where he became manager for the Līhuʻe Plantation owned by Henry A. Peirce and William Little Lee, replacing James Fowler Baldwin Marshall. Since the plantation had suffered through extremes of storms and a drought, his pay was supplemented by shares in ownership of the company. The position also included a house called Koamalu, which means "shade of the Acacia koa tree". From 1856 to 1857 Rice engineered and supervised construction of the first irrigation system for sugarcane in the Hawaiian Islands. It took water from the wetter elevations of Kilohana Crater at 21°59′58″N 159°25′41″W, diverting the Hanamāʻulu Stream to solve the problem of uneven rainfall. It started as a simple ditch similar to smaller scale projects that ancient Hawaiians had developed, eventually adding flumes and tunnels.

== Death and legacy ==
Rice made a brief trip to California in 1861, but died from tuberculosis in Līhuʻe on Kauaʻi on May 27, 1862. His wife lived on until May 25, 1911, continuing to be a benefactor. Although he did not live to see it, the plantation shares became valuable as the demand for sugar increased due to the American Civil War and the Reciprocity Treaty of 1875. In 1907 the original Rice Hall at Punahou was torn down and replaced by a new dormitory also named for the family. It was subsequently demolished in 1950, and the central open area of the campus is now called Rice Field.

The Rices had five children. Daughter Hannah Maria Rice was born at Hana on February 17, 1842, in 1861, married German Paul Isenberg, and died April 7, 1867. Isenberg (1837–1903) took over managing the plantation in 1862, and then was partner in the company that became Amfac, Inc. with Heinrich Hackfeld. Daughter Emily Dole Rice was born May 10, 1844, married Honolulu judge George de la Vergne (1839–1924) in 1867, and died June 13, 1911, in Los Angeles. Son William Hyde Rice was born July 23, 1846, and became a politician, serving as the last Governor of Kauai. Mary Sophia Rice was born January 7, 1849, and died September 5, 1870.

Daughter Anna Charlotte Rice was born on September 5, 1853, married businessman Charles Montague Cooke, founded the Honolulu Museum of Art, and died on August 8, 1934. Their son was banker and politician Clarence Hyde Cooke (1876–1944), and great-grandson judge Alan Cooke Kay (born 1932). Other descendants include scientist Charles Montague Cooke, Jr. (1874–1948), musician Francis Judd Cooke (1910–1995), and baseball player Steve Cooke.

The modest irrigation system was expanded over the years. It was copied in other places in the islands, including a project by Henry Perrine Baldwin. Baldwin's daughter Charlotte married Rice's grandson Harold Waterhouse Rice in December 1907. By 1922, he had 66 known living descendants.

== Family tree ==
Rice–Cooke family tree

William Harrison Rice (1813–1862)	Mary Sophia Hyde (1816–1911)	Amos Starr Cooke (1810–1871)	Juliette Montague (1812–1896)
Paul Isenberg (1837–1903)	Maria Rice (1842–1867)	William Hyde Rice (1846–1924)	Anna Rice (1853–1934)	C. M. Cooke (1849–1909)
D. Paul R. Isenberg (1866–1919)	Charles A. Rice (1876–1899)	Harold Rice (1883–1962)	C. M. Cooke Jr. (1874–1948)	Clarence Hyde Cooke (1876–1944)	George Paul Cooke (1882-1960)
Dora Jane Cole (1917–1988)	Juliet Rice Wichman (1901–1987)	Harold Thomas Kay (1896–1976)	Anna Frances Cooke (1903–1956)	Francis Judd Cooke (1910–1995)
Alan Cooke Kay (1932–2024)

== See also ==
- Sugar plantations in Hawaii
