= Wananalua Congregational Church =

Historic church in Hawaii, United States

- U.S. National Register of Historic Places
- Hawaiʻi Register of Historic Places
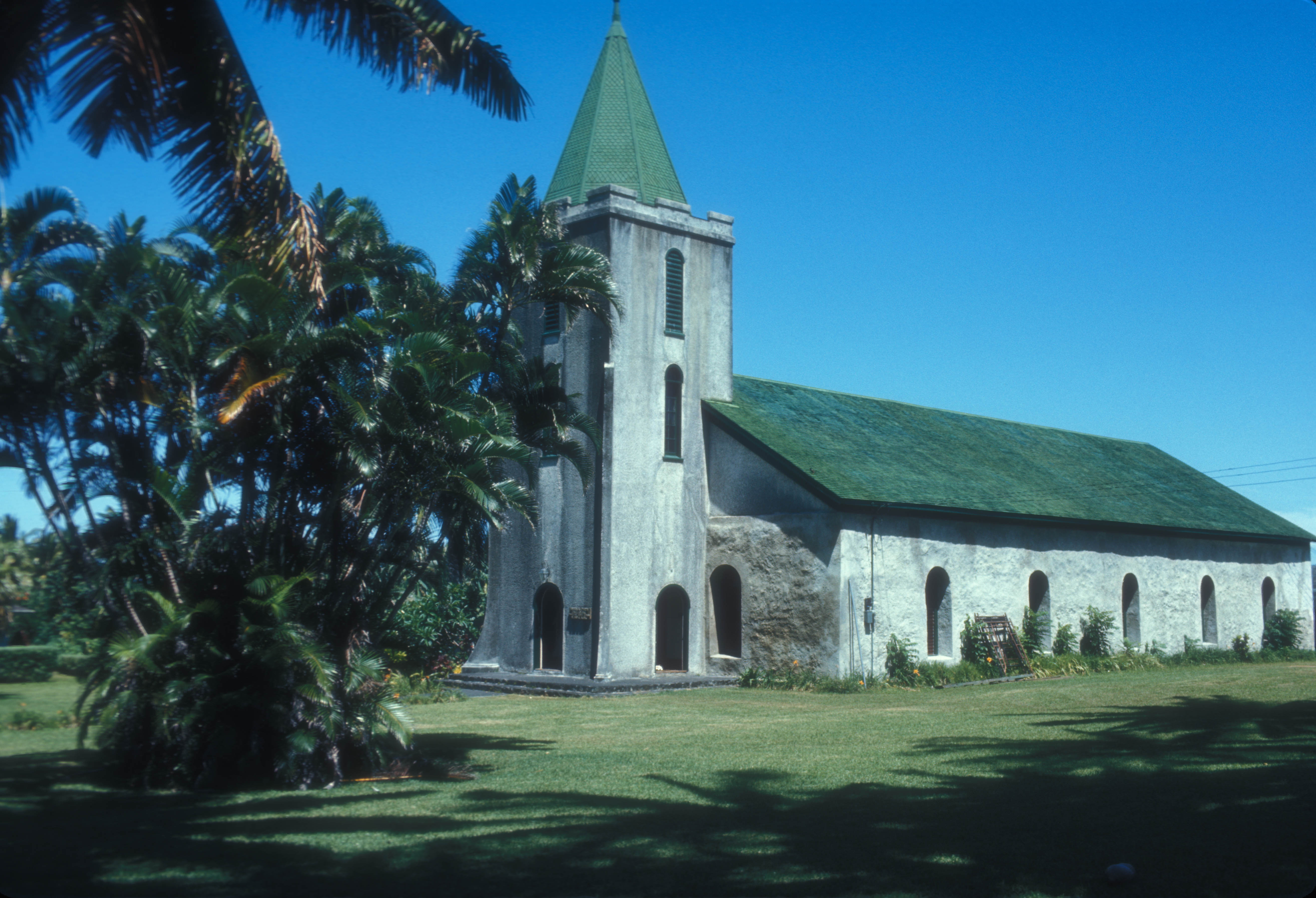

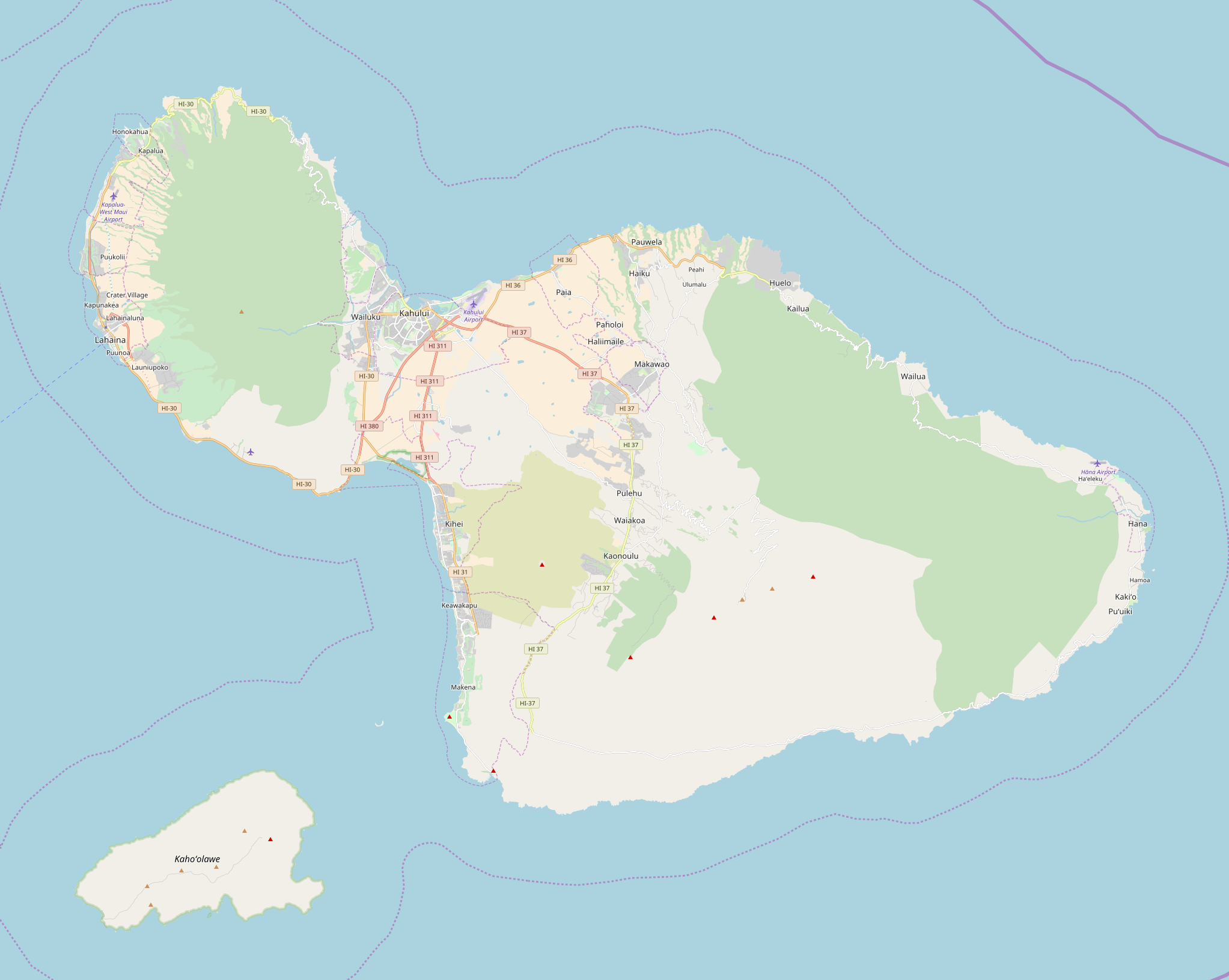
- Location within Maui Location within Hawaii
- Location: Hana Highway and Haouli Street; Hana, Hawaii
- Coordinates: 20°45′6″N 155°59′12″W
- Area: 3.7 acres (1.5 ha)
- Built: 1842
- Architect: Daniel Conde
- Architectural style: Renaissance
- NRHP reference No.: 88002533
- HRHP No.: 50-50-13-01521

Significant dates
- Added to NRHP: November 23, 1988
- Designated HRHP: November 23, 1988

The Wananalua Congregational Church is a historic 19th-century building on the remote coast of Maui in Hawaii.

== History ==
Wānanalua was the name of a traditional land division (ahupuaʻa) on the eastern coast of the island of Maui. The name means "double prophecy" in the Hawaiian language. The American Board of Commissioners for Foreign Missions established a mission at the site in 1838. First residents were Daniel Toll Conde, and his wife Andelucia Lee Conde. Reverend Mark Ives (1809–1885) served at the station until 1840. In 1841 William Harrison Rice and his wife arrived, who stayed until 1844. In 1848 the Condes moved to the Kaʻahumanu Church in Wailuku, and in 1855 after the death of his wife, Conde moved to Beloit, Wisconsin. Eliphalet W. Whittlesey (1816–1889) was stationed at the church from 1844 to 1854, and William Otis Baldwin from 1855 to 1860. Sereno Edwards Bishop (1827–1909) and his wife Cornelia A. Sessions Bishop served the station from 1855 to 1865.

When land titles were formalized in the Mahele, 27.64 acres (11.19 ha) were recorded as awarded to the church. The modern church boundary area of 3.7 acres (1.5 ha) was added to the National Register of Historic Places listings in Hawaii on November 23, 1988 as site 88002533. It is located at the corner of and the Hana Highway (Route 31) at 20°45′6″N 155°59′12″W. Across the street is the Hotel Hana-Maui, originally called the Kaʻuiki Inn. It is named for the cinder cone Kaʻuiki, which is the site of a rare Red Sand Beach, and a fortress from the time of ancient Hawaii where several historic battles were held. It was also the birthplace of powerful civil leader Queen Kaʻahumanu.

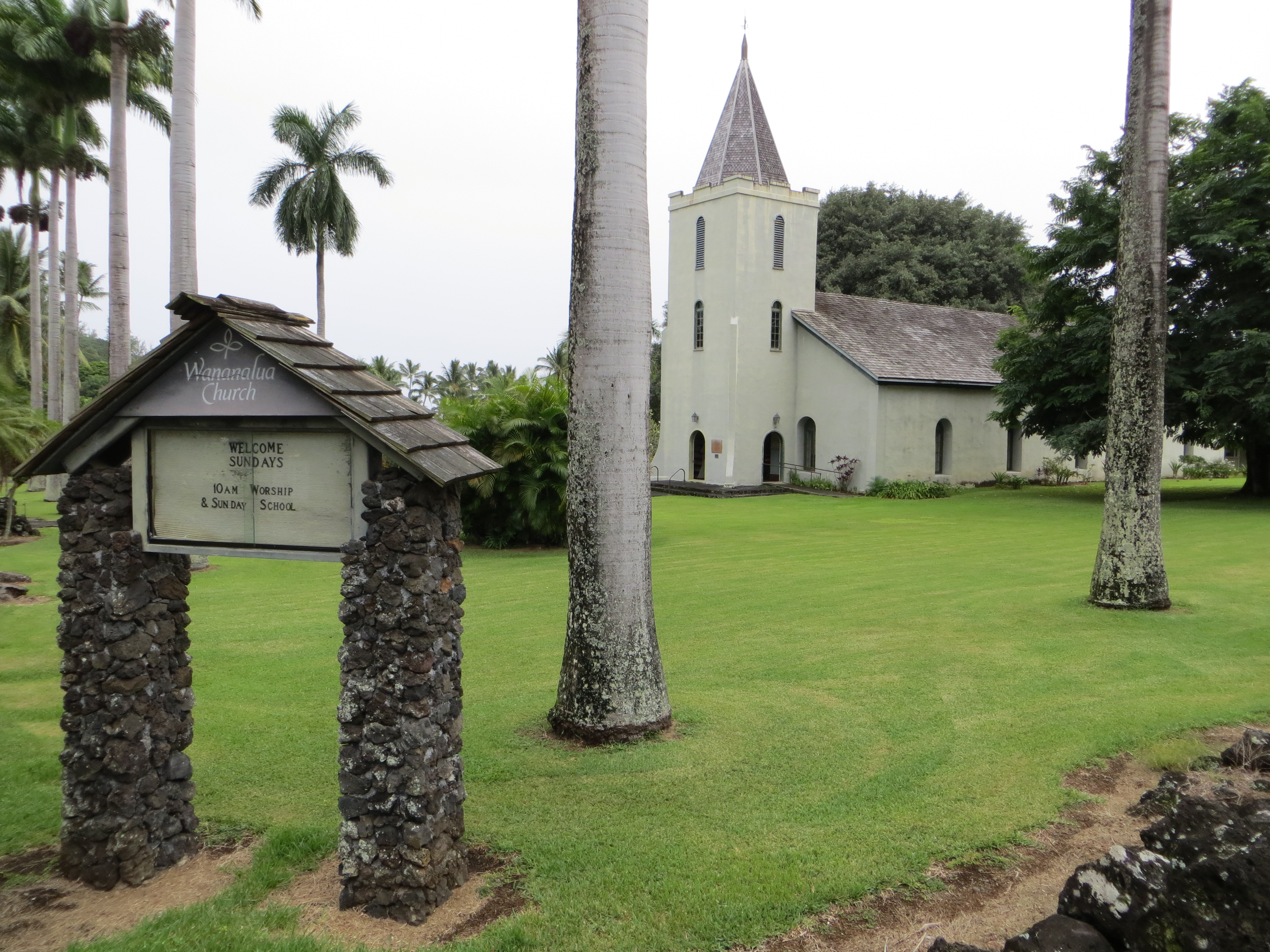
corner lot

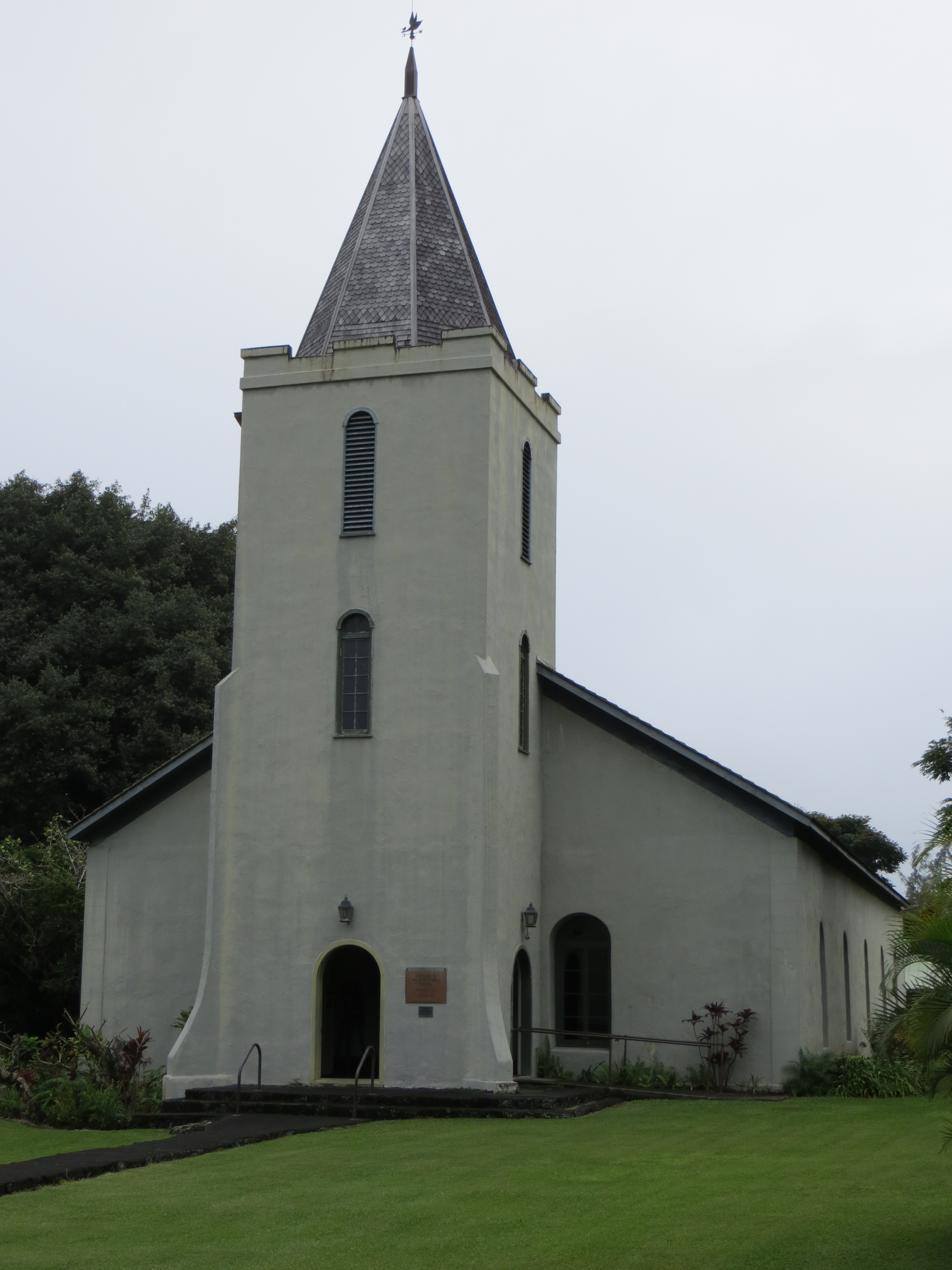
church entrance
