= Frank Montague Moore =

American painter

Honolulu from Sand Island. oil on canvas painting by Frank Montague Moore, c. 1920s

Frank Montague Moore (1877–1967) was an English-born painter, businessperson, and museum director. He was the first director of the Honolulu Museum of Art.

== Biography ==
Frank Montague Moore was born November 24, 1877, in Taunton, England, and studied at the Liverpool Art School and the Royal Institute. He immigrated to the United States and took additional painting lessons from Henry Ward Ranger. In 1910, he moved from New York City to Hawaii, where he worked as a purchasing agent for Hawaii Plantations. He became the first director of the Honolulu Museum of Art in 1924, but resigned in 1927, shortly before the museum opened.

In 1928, he left Hawaii for California, where he painted 41 murals collectively known as the Picture Bridge for the Huntington Hotel in Pasadena and many easel paintings of California landscapes. Moore died in Carmel, California, on March 5, 1967.

The Auckland War Memorial Museum and the Honolulu Museum of Art are among the public collections holding paintings by Frank Montague Moore.
