= Clarence Hyde Cooke =

American politician

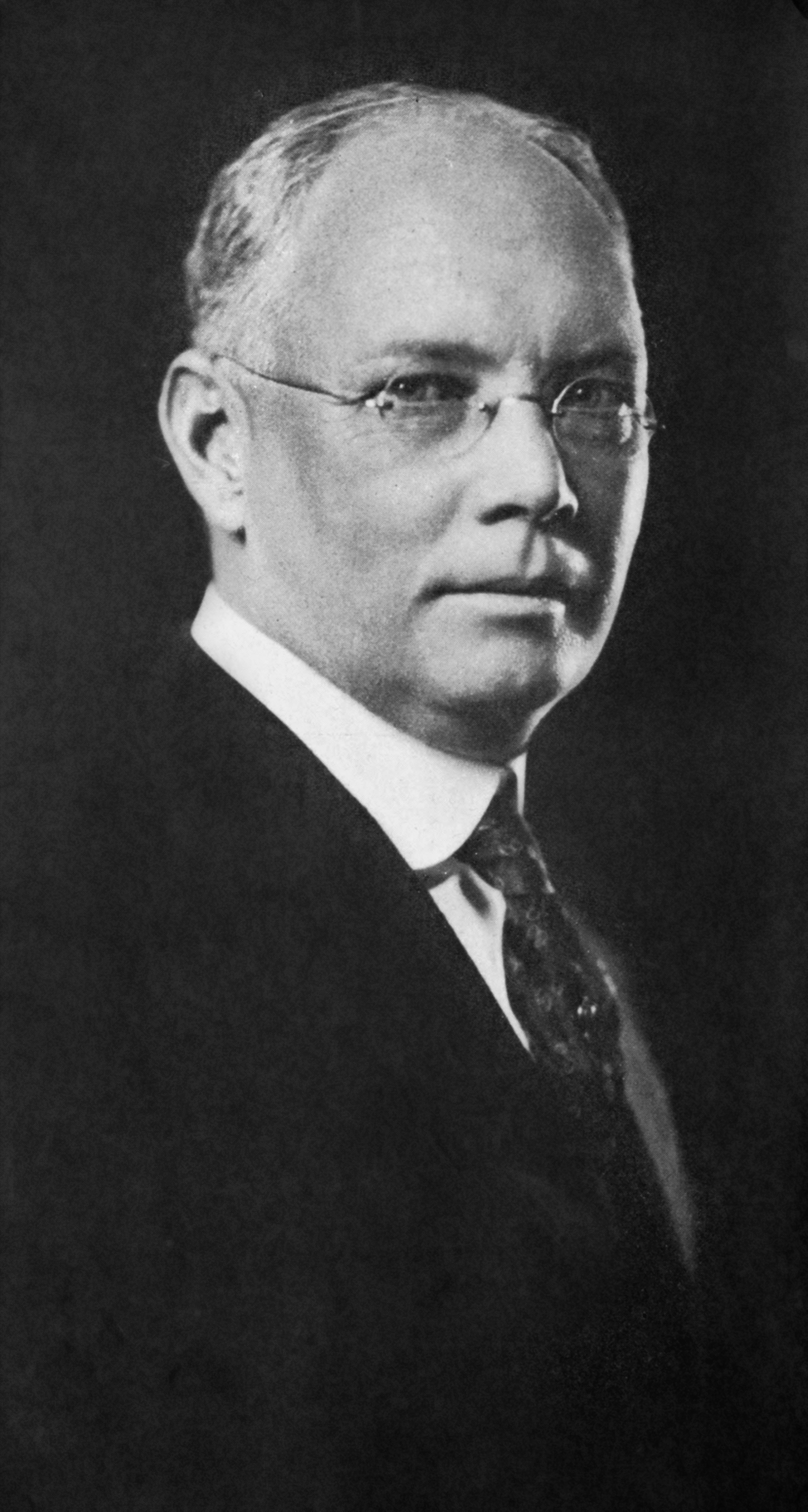
- Born: April 17, 1876; Honolulu, Hawaii
- Died: August 23, 1944 (aged 68)
- Occupations: Businessman, politician
- Parent(s): Charles Montague Cooke; Anna Rice Cooke

Clarence Hyde Cooke (April 17, 1876 – August 23, 1944) was a politician and businessman in Honolulu.

== Life ==
Clarence Cooke was born April 17, 1876, in Honolulu, Hawaii. He was the second son of Charles Montague Cooke and Anna Rice Cooke, and grandson of New England Congregational missionaries to Hawaiʻi Amos Starr Cooke and William Harrison Rice, and thus partial heir to the fortune of Castle & Cooke. He was educated at Punahou School and Yale University.

In 1909, he succeeded his father as president of the Bank of Hawaii, then became chairman of the board in 1937. He also served as president of two banks on Maui, First National Bank of Wailuku and Lahaina National Bank (which later merged to become the Bank of Maui). He held high positions on the boards of many other large corporations in the Territory of Hawaii, including Hawaiian Electric Company, Hawaiian Trust Company, Molokai Ranch, and several big sugarcane plantations. He was a founding member of The Pacific Club and the Oahu Country Club, and president of the Charles M. and Anna C. Cooke Trust (now the Cooke Foundation).

He was elected to the territorial Hawaii House of Representatives in 1913–23 and as a delegate to the 1924 Republican National Convention in Cleveland, Ohio. He was elected Speaker of the territorial House of Representatives in 1927, then elected to the territorial Senate in 1929 and 1931.

On August 11, 1898, he married Lily Love, who died in 1933, shortly after they completed a great mansion now called the Clarence H. Cooke House on land he owned in Nuʻuanu Valley, where he lived until his own death on August 23, 1944. They had 8 children. His grandson is judge Alan Cooke Kay (born 1932), son of his daughter Anna Frances Cooke (1903–1956) and Harold Thomas Kay (1896–1976).
