= Juliet Rice Wichman =

Hawaiian conservationist and botanist

- Born: Juliet Atwood Rice; October 23, 1901; Honolulu, Territory of Hawaii (now United States)
- Died: November 5, 1987 (aged 86); Hāʻena, Kauaʻi, Hawaii, United States
- Other name: Juliet Rice Goodale
- Occupations: Botanist, museum founder, museum director
- Spouse(s): March Holbrook Goodale (m. 1921–1926; divorce), Frederick Warren Wichman (m. 1927–; divorce)
- Children: 3
- Relatives: William Hyde Rice (paternal grandfather), William Harrison Rice (paternal great grandfather), Mary Sophia Hyde (paternal great grandmother)
- Awards: Living Treasures of Hawaii (1981)

Juliet Rice Wichman (née Juliet Atwood Rice; October 23, 1901 – November 5, 1987) was an American Hawaiian conservationist, botanist, and author. Wichman worked to preserve Hawaiian culture, flora, and fauna through the creation of the Limahuli Garden and Preserve and through writings about ancient Hawaiian agriculture. She co-founded the Kauaʻi Museum (Albert Spencer Wilcox Building) and served as its first director when it opened in 1960.

== Early years and career ==
Juliet Atwood Rice was born on October 23, 1901, in Honolulu, Territory of Hawaii (now United States). Her parents were Charles Atwood Rice and Grace Ethel King, of a Kauaʻi Kamaʻāina family. Her paternal grandfather was the son of William Hyde Rice, the last Governor of Kauai before the overthrow of the Hawaiian Kingdom. Juliet grew up riding horses on Kauaʻi and learning Hawaiian lore from her grandfather.

She attended Miss Ransom and Miss Bridges' School for Girls in Piedmont, California, and studied at Vassar College.

== Work in conservation ==
Wichman had a strong interest in conserving the land of Kauai. In the early 1950s, when construction workers were looking for fill dirt for projects near Keʻe, Wichman stood in front of a bulldozer to stop the destruction of a rock wall that was part of the foundation of the house of Lohiʻau. (Note: The "House of Lohiʻau" is a stone structure of cultural importance to Native Hawaiians because of its connection to a mythological figure. Today, its remnants are located near a parking lot, and have been described as having "Tahitian" stonework; but the structure hasn't been dated.)

In 1946, Wichman bought 1,000 acres on the north shore of Kauaʻi island. She began transforming a section of the land of Limahula Valley into a garden, removing the cattle that had grazed there for decades. She cleared land and worked to restore the terraces used to grow taro by Native Hawaiians. In 1967, Wichman donated thirteen acres of land to the National Tropical Botanical Garden to establish the Limahuli Garden and Preserve.

Wichman wrote several articles on gardening and on ancient Hawaiian agriculture, including Hawaiian planting traditions (1931). She collaborated with Dora Jane Isenberg Cole to write Early Kauai hospitality : a family cookbook of receipts, 1820-1920, published through the Kauai Museum Association in 1977. She was also the author of Amelia : a novel of mid-nineteenth century Hawaii (1979) and a children's book, Moki learns to fish (1981), teaching the Hawaiian words for the numbers one through ten.

She was active in many organizations, including serving as the chairman of the garden section of the Mokihana Club and chairman of the botanical section of the Kokee Natural History Museum. During World War II, Wichman co-founded the Hawaiian unit of the American Red Cross. Wichman was the chair of the committee that founded the Kauaʻi Museum and helped raise funds for the building to house it. When the museum opened in 1960, she served as its first director. She was also one of the original members of the Hawaiian Botanical Gardens Foundation, which successfully lobbied for the 1964 charter from Congress that established the Pacific Tropical Botanical Garden (later known as the National Tropical Botanical Garden).

== Personal life and death ==
Wichman was married twice. Her first husband, March Holbrook Goodale (known simply as Holbrook Goodale), was a pilot on Pan Am clipper flights, and they married in 1921; their marriage was dissolved in March 1926 in Hawaii, and he remarried another in March 1927 in Philadelphia. Goodale died with three others in October 1927 on Lāʻie, Oahu, in an biplane crash in which he was piloting.

She married her second husband, Frederick Warren Wichman, in September 1927. She had three sons: Holbrook Wichman Goodale, Charles Rice Goodale, and Frederick Bruce Wichman. Their home in Wailua was named "Pihanakalani". Later they moved to Portland, Oregon, then Menlo Park, California.

She died at age 86 on November 5, 1987, in Hāʻena.

== Legacy ==
In 1981, Wichman was honored as one of the Living Treasures of Hawaii by the Honpa Hongwanji Mission of Hawaii.

Formerly known as the Hawaiian Heritage Gallery, the Juliet Rice Wichman Heritage Gallery is located within the Kauaʻi Museum and displays items that belonged to the island's monarchs. The Juliet Rice Wichman Botanical Research Center at the National Tropical Botanical Garden is the hub of the organization's scientific and conservation operations. The Limahuli Garden she established provides educational tours and protection for the native environment.
