= Mary Sophia Hyde Rice =

American missionary

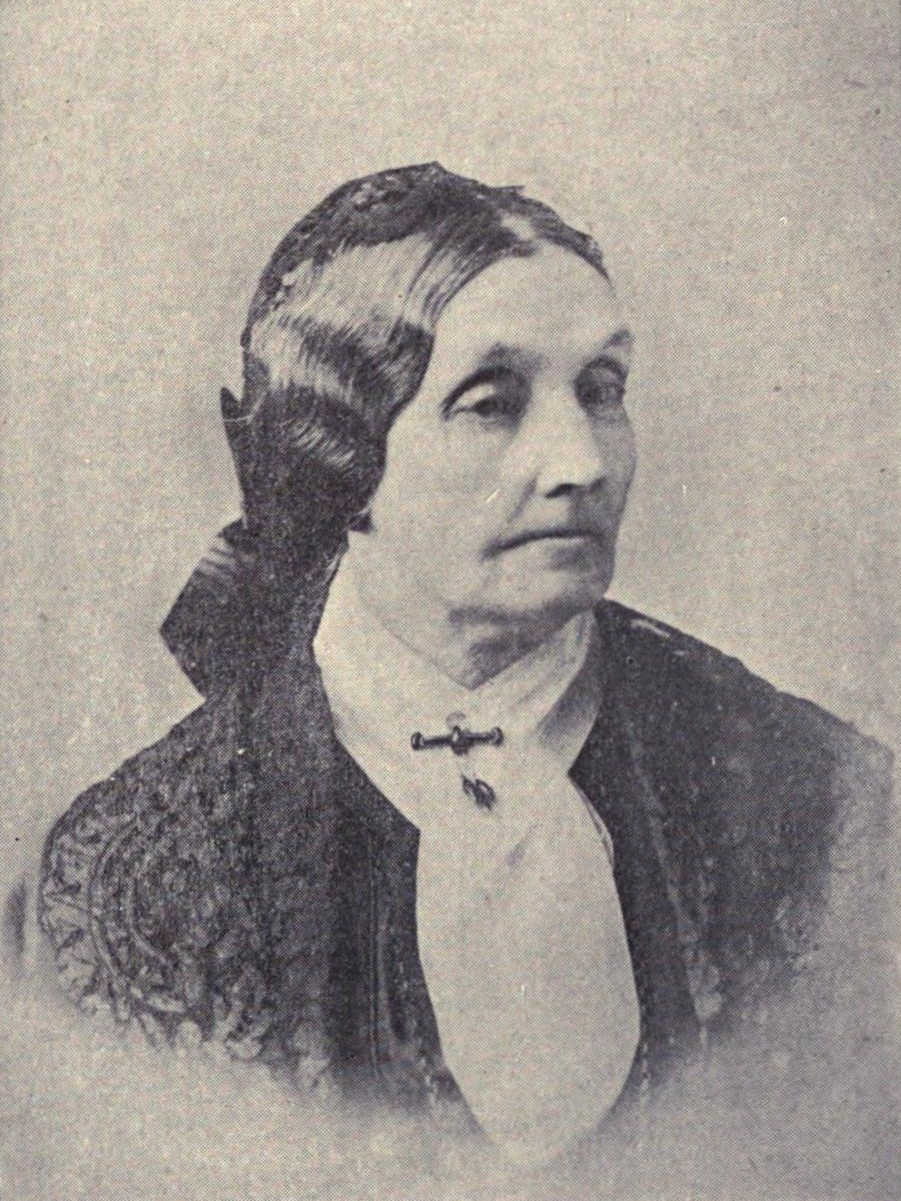
- Mary Sophia Hyde Rice, c. 1890
- Born: October 11, 1816; Buffalo Creek Reservation, New York
- Died: May 25, 1911 (aged 94); Līhuʻe, Kauaʻi, Territory of Hawaii
- Occupations: Missionary, Teacher
- Spouse: William Harrison Rice
- Children: William Hyde Rice; Anna Charlotte Rice; Three others

Mary Sophia Hyde Rice (October 11, 1816 – May 25, 1911), known as Mother Rice, was an American missionary and educator from the United States who settled in the Hawaiian Islands. She was a teacher at Punahou School and matron of Mills College. She was the last surviving member of the original twelve companies of American Board of Commissioners for Foreign Missions (ABCFM) missionaries sent to Hawaii between 1820 and 1848.

== Early life ==
Mary Sophia Hyde was born in the Buffalo Creek Reservation, in western New York State near current-day West Seneca. Her parents were Rev. Jabez Backus Hyde, a missionary to the Seneca nation, and Jerusha Aiken Hyde. As a girl, she learned to read from the future President Millard Fillmore.

== Career ==
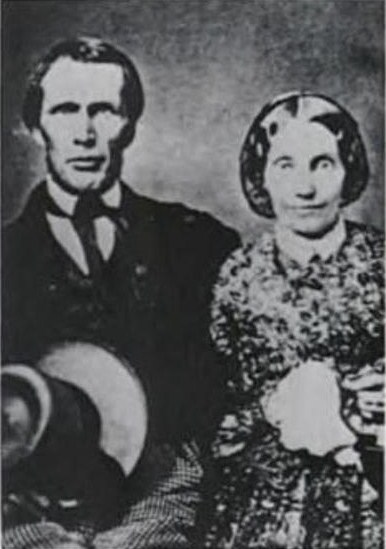
William Harrison Rice and his wife, Mary Sophia Hyde Rice

On September 29, 1840, she married William Harrison Rice. Her father performed the wedding ceremony. In 1840, as a new bride, she left New York for the Oregon Territory via the Hawaiian Islands, where her husband was assigned as a missionary. The Rices sailed in the ninth company of missionaries to Hawaii from the American Board of Commissioners for Foreign Missions (ABCFM) on the ship Gloucester, leaving from Boston on November 14, 1840, and arriving in Honolulu on May 21, 1841. Also in this company were John Davis Paris, Elias Bond, and Daniel Dole. The Rice and Paris families intended to proceed to Oregon Territory, but after being told of Indian uprisings at the Whitman Mission, they decided to stay in Hawaii.

Their first posting after learning the Hawaiian language was the remote Wānanalua mission station in the Hana district, on the eastern coast of the island of Maui. Reverend Daniel Conde had founded the station in 1838, but was holding services in a traditional Hawaiian thatched building. The native Hawaiians were put to work building a stone building starting in 1842, which still stands.

In 1844 the Rice family was transferred to become the first secular teachers at Punahou School that had been founded by Dole two years before in Honolulu. One of their first tasks was to have a house constructed for the family and some boarders, known as "Rice Hall". Her husband then supervised the building of a building now called "Old School Hall" from 1848 to 1851, largely with student labor. She worked ten years as a teacher and matron at Punahou, where she was known as "Mother Rice". Her students included William DeWitt Alexander, Samuel C. Armstrong and Sanford B. Dole, who became President of the Republic of Hawaii from 1894 to 1898 and later Governor of Hawaii Territory from 1900 to 1903.

In 1854 the Rice family removed to Lihue, Kauai to run a sugar plantation. Queen Liliuokalani visited the Rice family at Lihue in 1891 during her circuit of the islands, recalling them fondly: "At Kauai we were most hospitably received and royally entertained by Mr. and Mrs. W. H. Rice. They took us to their handsome private residence at Lihue, to which there came all the principal people of the islands to pay respects".

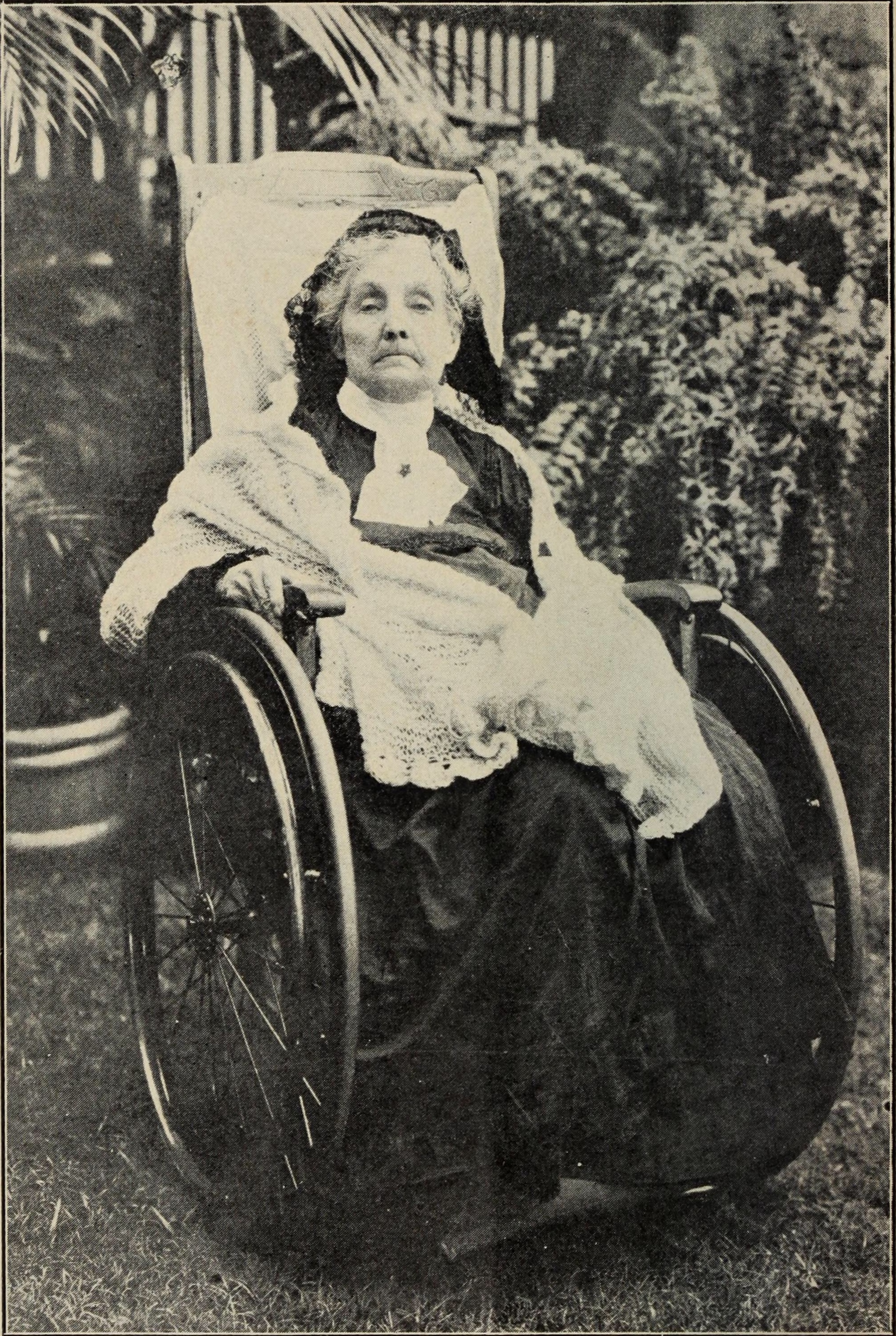
Mary Sophia Hyde Rice seated in a wheelchair, from a 1912 publication

In widowhood, Rice traveled to Germany with her grandchildren, and worked as a matron at Mills Seminary in California, before returning to Hawaii permanently in 1900. She was benefactor of churches in the Hawaiian Islands, funding construction and repairs. Her ninetieth birthday in 1906 was marked with articles and tributes in Hawaii.

== Personal life ==
Mary Sophia Hyde and William Harrison Rice had five children together, all born in the Hawaiian Islands: Hannah Maria (1842–1867), Emily (1844–1911), William Hyde Rice (1846–1924), Mary (1847–1870), and Anna Rice Cooke (1853–1934). Her husband died in 1862. She also helped to raise two of her grandchildren. She died on May 25, 1911, aged 94 years. She was the last surviving member of the original twelve companies of ABCFM missionaries sent to Hawaii between 1820 and 1848.

The Rice Family Papers are archived at the Kauaʻi Historical Society.

In 1907 the original Rice Hall at Punahou was torn down and replaced by a new dormitory also named for the family. It was subsequently demolished in 1950, and the central open area of the campus is now called Rice Field.

In 1912, the Moiliili Playground was begun by the Rice family in memory of Mother Rice, with a fund for its maintenance. It opened in 1917, and soon added a kindergarten; the children's program continues at the site today, as the Mother Rice Preschool.
