= Mabel Isabel Wilcox =

Hawaiian nurse (1882–1978)

Mabel Isabel Wilcox at Johns Hopkins School of Nursing c.1911

Mabel Isabel Wilcox (November 4, 1882 – December 28, 1978) was a pioneering nurse on the island of Kauai. She served with the Red Cross in Europe during World War I, and was decorated by Elisabeth of Bavaria, Queen of Belgium and by the Mayor of Le Havre. She was instrumental in instituting public nursing services on Kauai and in getting a hospital built on the island.

== Family background ==
She was born November 4, 1882, in the Kingdom of Hawaii, on the island of Kauai, as one of six children of Samuel Whitney Wilcox and Emma Washburn Lyman Wilcox. Mabel's mother was a seminary student in Chicago in 1871 when the Great Chicago Fire occurred. Her father was a Kauai sugar planter, manager of a cattle ranch, and sheriff of Kauai for 25 years.

Maternal grandparents David Belden Lyman and Sarah Joiner Lyman, and paternal grandparents Abner Wilcox and Lucy Eliza Hart Wilcox, had been sent to Hawaii by the American Board of Commissioners for Foreign Missions in Massachusetts. She was the niece of businessmen George Norton Wilcox and Albert Spencer Wilcox.

Her sisters and brothers were high-achieving individuals. Sister Lucy Etta Wilcox Sloggett was a civic leader on Kauai, and also the World War I secretary of the Maui chapter of the American Red Cross. Sister Elsie Hart Wilcox served as a senator in the Hawaii territorial legislature. Her older brother Ralph Lyman Wilcox was a plantation overseer on Kauai; brother Charles Henry Wilcox served in the Hawaii National Guard, managed sugar plantations, and had been a representative in the territorial legislature; brother Gaylord Parke Wilcox was chairman of the Board of Grove Farm, Ltd.

== Education and early career ==
She received her early education at home from a private instructor, transferring later to Punahou School on Oahu, followed by three years at Oakland High School in California, completing her basic education at the college preparatory Dana Hall School in Massachusetts.

Her parents discouraged her from a career in nursing, but she persisted in pursuing her profession at Johns Hopkins School of Nursing, receiving her RN degree in 1911. According to Johns Hopkins, she was the first Hawaii resident to graduate from the school. Upon graduation, she remained in New York for several years, affiliated with the Buffalo Red Cross War Relief organization.

In 1915, she returned home to Kauai as an employee of the Territorial Board of Health. Instituting the island's first public nursing services, she was influential in raising funds and getting the territorial legislature to allocate land to build the Samuel Mahelona Memorial Hospital at Kapaa.

== World War I ==
With the outbreak of World War I, Johns Hopkins pediatrician Edwards A. Park, working with the American Red Cross Belgian Commission, headed the Children's Hospital in Le Havre as a facility for refugee Belgian children. He appointed Mabel as head nurse in supervision over 15 other nurses, among whom was Ethel Moseley Damon of Honolulu. They provided medical care and a safe haven for the children, often putting themselves in harm's way behind enemy lines to assist refugee women. In recognition of their war-time services, Mabel and Ethel were decorated with the Queen Elisabeth Medal by the Queen Elisabeth of Belgium and the Bronze Medal of the City of Le Havre by the Mayor of Le Havre.

== Postwar career ==
Returning home to Kauai, she became the trustee and treasurer of Samuel Mahelona Memorial Hospital, and a probation officer of the Kauai County Juvenile Court. In the ensuing decades, she served in administrative and advisory capacities of numerous boards and institutions. Mabel and her sisters renovated the Wai‘oli Mission House, which had been the boyhood home of their father. The house is now part of the Waioli Mission District on Kauai.

She died at home on December 28, 1978, and is buried on the island of Kauai.

== Bibliography ==
- Hawaiian Mission Children's Society (1901). American Protestant Missionaries to Hawaii. Hawaiian Mission Children's Society – via HathiTrust.
- Peterson, Barbara Bennett, ed. (1984). Notable women of Hawaii. Honolulu: University of Hawaii Press. pp. 403–405. ISBN 978-0-8248-0820-4.
