= Frederick S. Lyman =

Frederick Schwartz Lyman
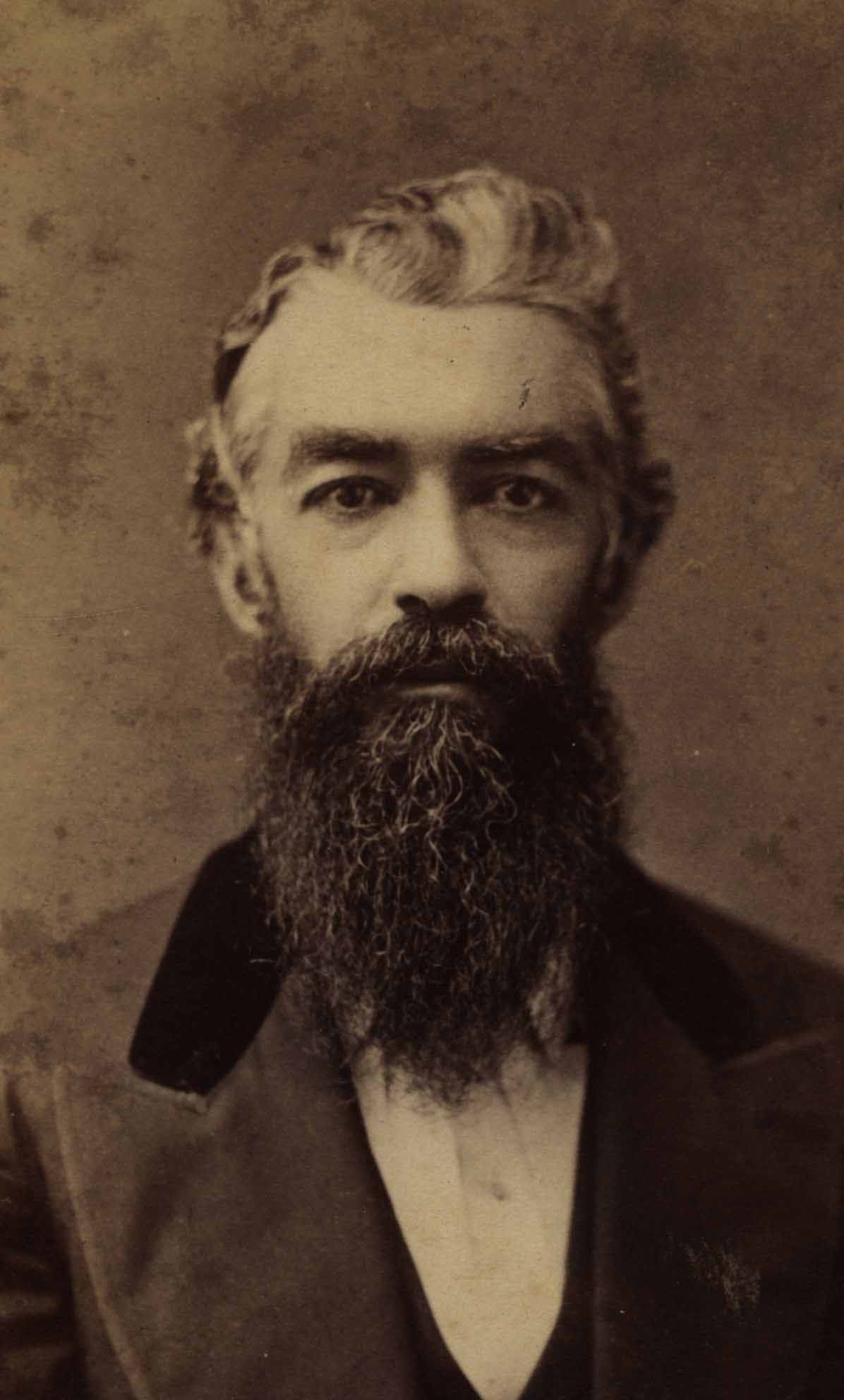
- Born: July 25, 1837; Hilo, Hawaii
- Died: April 14, 1918 (aged 80)
- Children: 6
- Parent(s): David Belden Lyman; Sarah Joiner Lyman

Frederick Schwartz Lyman (July 25, 1837 – April 14, 1918) was a surveyor, rancher, judge, and politician on Hawaiʻi Island.

== Life ==
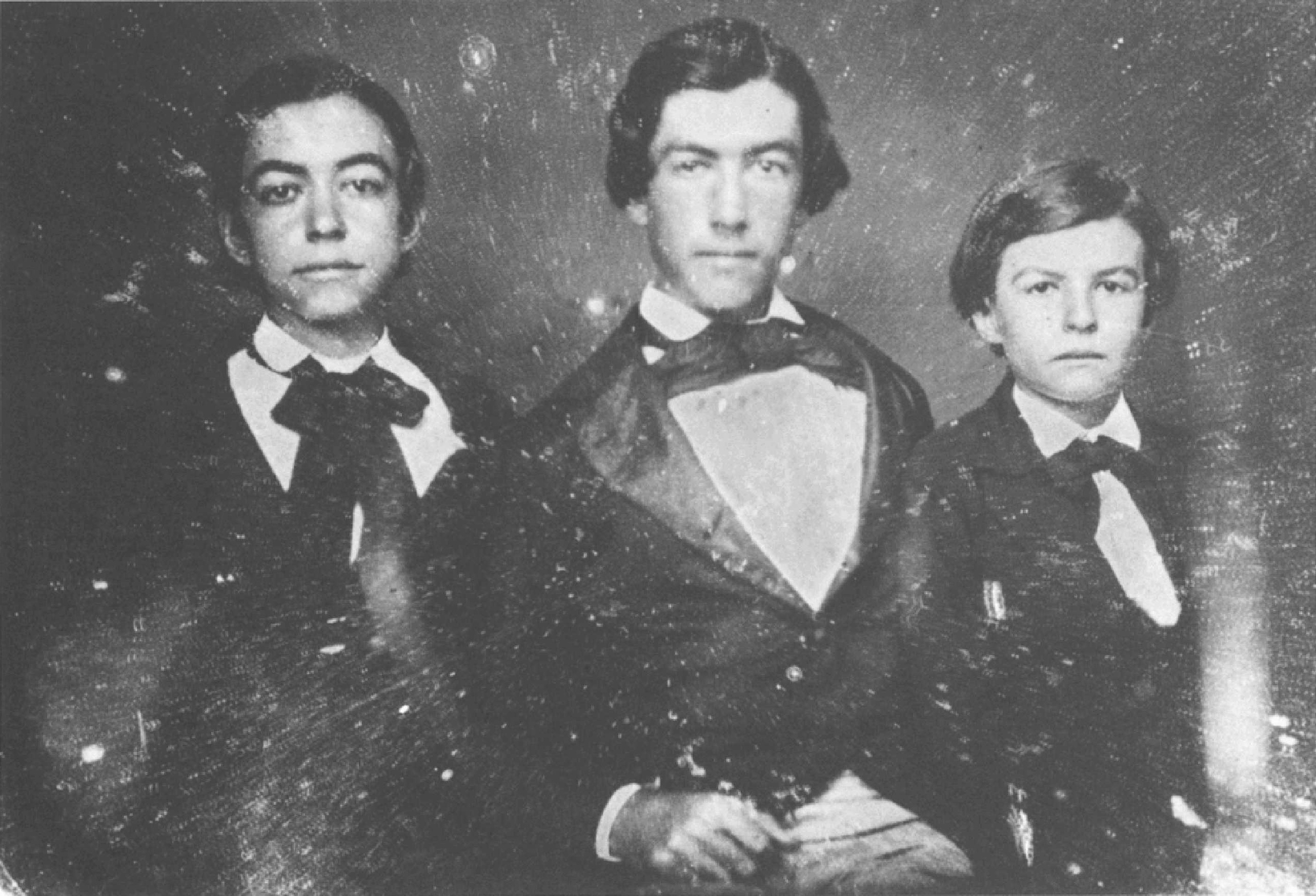
Frederick Schwartz Lyman (left) with his brothers Henry Munson and David Brainerd

Frederick Schwartz Lyman was born July 25, 1837, in Hilo, Hawaii. His middle name is sometimes spelled "Swartz". His father was David Belden Lyman (1803–1868) and mother was Sarah Joiner Lyman (1805–1885). The couple were early missionaries who founded Hilo Boarding School. His boyhood home is now the Lyman House Memorial Museum. He attended Oahu College from 1850 through 1860. He and schoolmate Samuel Thomas Alexander left briefly to seek their fortunes in California, but soon returned after finding the California Gold Rush had already run its course. In July 1857 he worked as tax assessor for Hawaiʻi Island. He continued working as surveyor and tax assessor during school vacations and after graduation. He was required to record people's ages for the land they owned, but since ancient Hawaii did not use the Christian calendar, he used oral tradition calibrated with a list of major events. One of these was the unusually explosive eruption of Kīlauea known as Keonehelelei, "the falling sands".

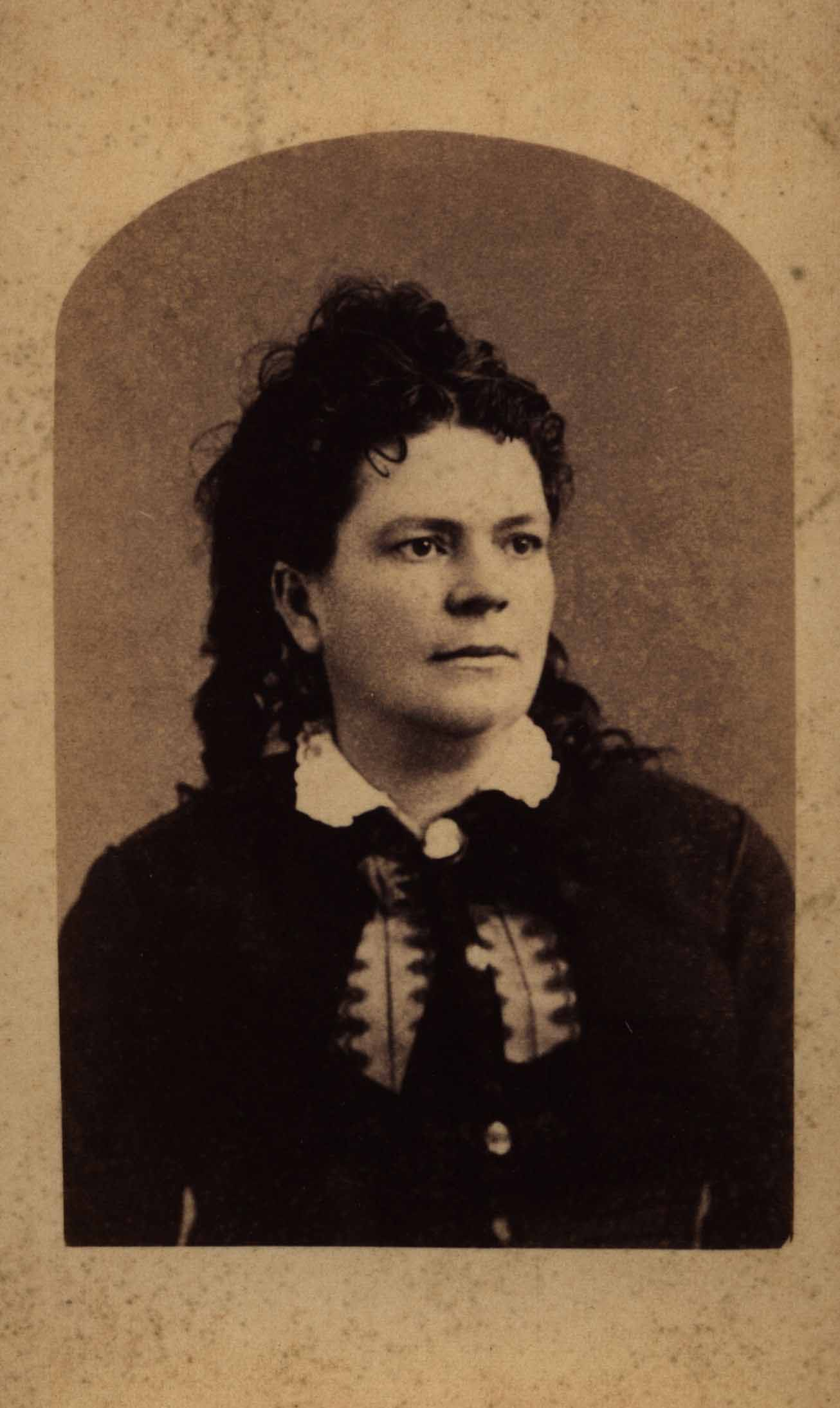
Isabella Chambelain Lyman

He married Isabella Chamberlain (1838–1901), daughter of Levi Chamberlain, another missionary, on February 16, 1861 and had six children. Isabella's childhood home, Chamberlain House is now the Mission Houses Museum. They moved to a ranch to raise various livestock such as sheep and goats at Keaīwa in the remote Kaʻū district 19°13′18″N 155°27′37″W to raise a family. Lady Franklin was a guest during her search for her husband, the lost explorer Sir John Franklin. Mark Twain was a guest on his 1866 visit. Lyman became a judge, first a district magistrate in Kaʻū in 1867. However, a series of disasters struck the otherwise quiet bucolic area in 1868.

Letters to his brother David Brainerd Lyman (1840–1914) describe a massive eruption of Mauna Loa on their ranch accompanied by a series of earthquakes from March 27 to March 31. His eyewitness observations, sometimes called the "best account" of the events, has been used by scientists for many years. A few days later, the powerful April 2, 1868 Hawaii earthquake, destroyed their house and most others in the area. A massive landslide triggered by the shock killed much of his livestock. From one of the letters:

"It was impossible to stand, we had to sit on the ground, bracing with hands and feet to keep from rolling over. In the midst of it we saw burst out... what we supposed to be an immense river of molten lava (which afterwards proved to be red earth), which rushed down its headlong course and across the plain below, ... swallowing up everything in its way, trees, houses, cattle, horses, goats and men. ... After the hard shaking had ceased, all along the sea-shore the sea was boiling and foaming furiously, all red, for about an eighth of a mile from the shore, and the shore was covered by the sea."

The resulting tsunami killed many of the witnesses who were living at lower elevations. It was the largest earthquake in modern recorded history of the Hawaiian Islands. This convinced the family to return to town, where he looked for whatever employment he could.

After moving back to Hilo, he started a tanning and saddle business, with William Alfred Todd as partner. Lyman became a Circuit judge from 1869 through 1893. He was fluent in the Hawaiian language, and had the Hawaiian nickname "Pele", a pun based on the volcano goddess Pele and the Hawaiian version of "Freddie". From 1879 through 1888 he acted as secretary for the Royal Governor of Hawaii Island, first Princess Likelike, and then Victoria Kinoiki Kekaulike. Although not directly involved in the 1893 overthrow of the Kingdom of Hawaii, his fortunes grew as he advocated ties to the United States. He invested in real estate, and various agricultural enterprises around Hilo, experimenting in coffee, cocoa, and arrowroot.

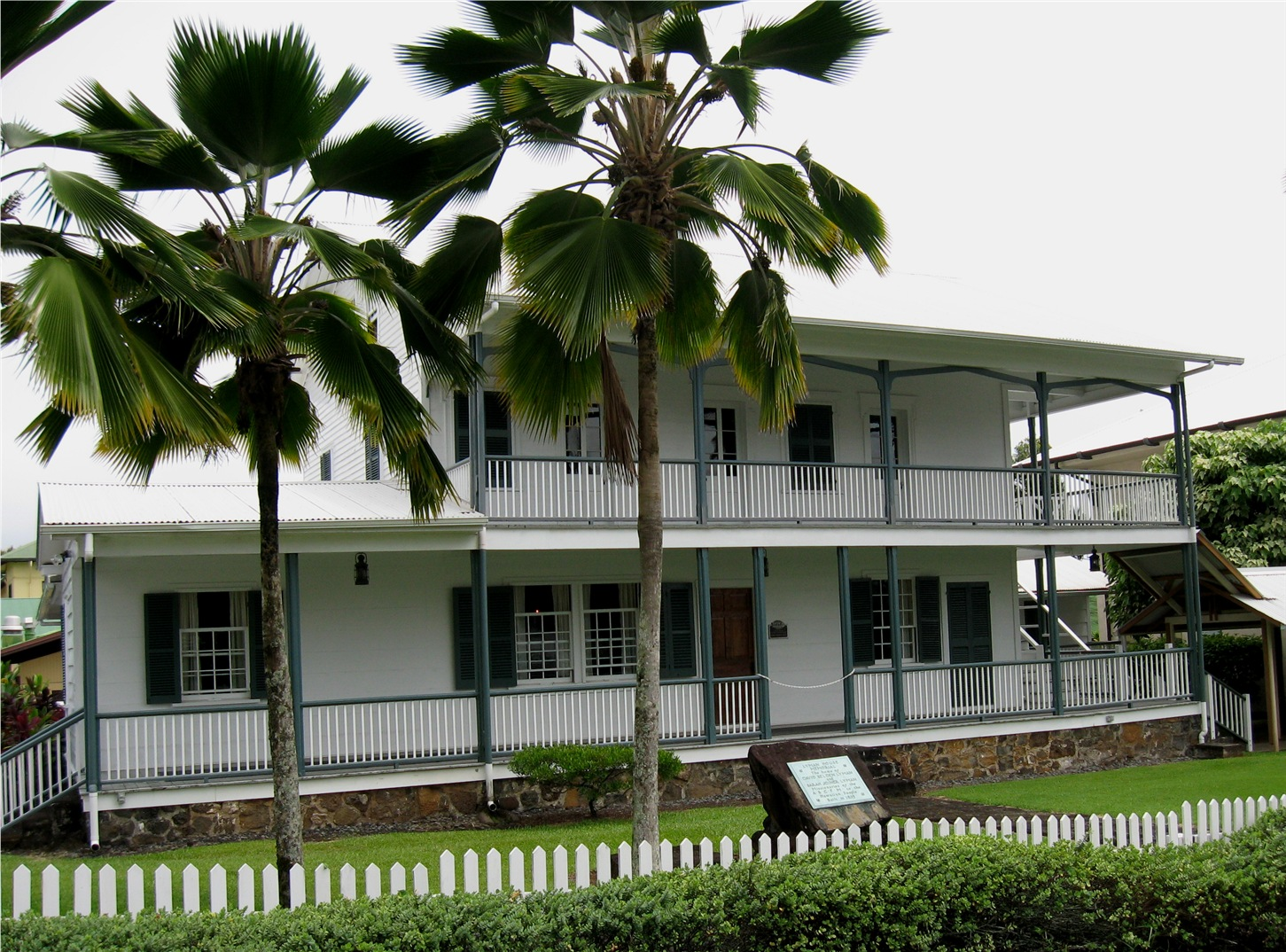
Lyman House Memorial Museum

In 1894 he was a delegate to the convention to write a constitution for the Republic of Hawaii. He was elected to the Senate of the Republic in 1895, and reelected through 1898. He was president of the Hilo & Hawaii Telephone Company (now part of Hawaiian Telcom), 1882–1885, organizer of the original Hilo Electric Light Company in 1894 (now part of HEI), and its president until 1911. From 1897 to 1918 he ran an insurance business. He worked with William Matson to promote Hawaii as a tourist attraction, leading to the establishment of Matson Navigation Company. He donated land for use in schools, churches, and parks.

Isabella died on May 16, 1901, and he died in Hilo on April 14, 1918. Brother Rufus Anderson Lyman also became active in politics and business (they were partners in several ventures). Son Levi Chamberlain Lyman was born December 16, 1866, and served 25 years as principal of the Hilo Boarding School, from 1897–1922. After a fire in 1927 destroyed the original 1856 building, Levi Lyman phased out church control of the school in favor of public schools of the Territory of Hawaii.

Other children were teacher Ellen Goodale Lyman (born November 30, 1861), twins pineapple rancher Frederick S. Lyman, Jr. (also known as Frederick Snowden Lyman, born May 7, 1863), and physician Francis Anderson Lyman (May 7, 1863 – October 22, 1917), businessman Ernest Everts Lyman, and Esther Rosalie Lyman (who married William McCluskey).

=== Family tree ===
Wilcox-Lyman family tree

Abner Wilcox (1808–1869) | Lucy Eliza Hart (1814–1869) | David Belden Lyman (1803–1868) | Sarah Joiner (1805–1885) | William Harrison Rice (1813–1862)
George Norton Wilcox (1839–1933) | Albert Spencer Wilcox (1844–1919) | Frederick S. Lyman (1837–1918) | Rufus Anderson Lyman (1842–1910) | William Hyde Rice (1846–1924)
Samuel Whitney Wilcox (1847–1929) | Emma Lyman (1849–1934)
Gaylord Parke Wilcox (1881–1970) | Ralph Lyman Wilcox (1876–1913) | Anna Charlotte Rice (born 1882)
