= Kapiolani Medical Center for Women and Children =

Coordinates: 21.2998°N 157.8335°W

Kapiʻolani Medical Center for Women and Children
- Hawaiʻi Pacific Health

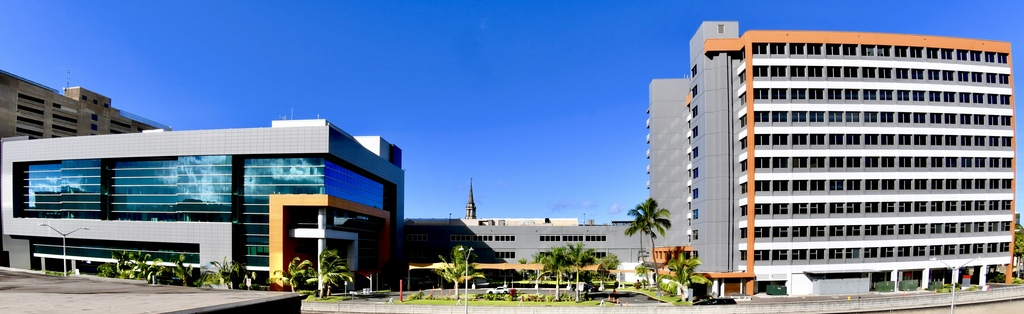
- Kapiolani Medical Center for Women & Children (2021)

Geography
- Location: Honolulu, Oʻahu, Hawaiʻi, United States

Organization
- Care system: Community, Specialist
- Type: Non-profit
- Patron: Queen Kapiʻolani
- Network: Hawaiʻi Pacific Health

Services
- Emergency department: Level III Pediatric Trauma Center
- Beds: 207

History
- Founded: 1890

Links
- Website: http://www.kapiolani.org
- Lists: Hospitals in the United States

Kapiʻolani Medical Center for Women and Children is a Women's and Children's hospital, It is part of Hawaiʻi Pacific Health's network of hospitals. It is located in Honolulu, Hawaiʻi within the neighborhood of Mōʻiliʻili. Kapiʻolani Medical Center is Hawaiʻi's only children's hospital with a team of physicians and nurses and specialized technology trained specifically to care for children, from infants to young adults. It is the state's only 24-hour pediatric emergency department, pediatric intensive care unit and adolescent unit. The hospital provides comprehensive pediatric specialties and subspecialties to infants, children, teens, and young adults aged 0–21 throughout Hawaii.

The facility was founded by Queen Kapiʻolani as the Kapiʻolani Maternity Home in 1890 for which she held bazaars and lūʻaus to raise the $8,000 needed to start the hospital. It has since changed its name several times. Kauikeōlani Children's Hospital opened in 1909 named for Emma Kauikeōlani Napoleon Mahelona (1862–1931), the wife of Albert Spencer Wilcox (1844–1919). In 1978, it merged with Kapiʻolani Hospital to become Kapiʻolani Medical Center for Women and Children. On August 4, 1961, future US president Barack Obama was born in the hospital.
