= George Norton Wilcox =

American businessman & politician (1839–1933)

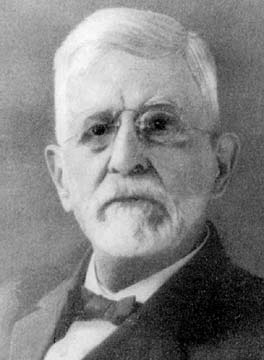
- Born: August 15, 1839; Hilo, Hawaii
- Died: January 21, 1933 (aged 93); Honolulu
- Occupations: Planter; businessman; politician
- Parent(s): Abner Wilcox; Lucy Eliza Hart

George Norton Wilcox (August 15, 1839 – January 21, 1933) was a businessman and politician in the Kingdom of Hawaii and Territory of Hawaii.

== Life ==
George Norton Wilcox was born in Hilo August 15, 1839. His father was Abner Wilcox and mother was Lucy Eliza Hart. His parents were in the company of missionaries to Hawaii for the American Board of Commissioners for Foreign Missions, sailing in 1836. His parents taught at the Hilo Mission boarding school founded by David Belden Lyman and his wife. He had one older brother and two younger ones born while at Hilo. In 1846, the family moved to teach at a similar school at the Waiʻoli Mission near Hanalei, Hawaii, on the northern coast of the island of Kauaʻi. There he had four more brothers, although one died young.

He graduated from Punahou School 1850–1860, and worked for Samuel Gardner Wilder loading a shipload of guano from Jarvis Island. He then attended Yale from 1860 to 1862, where he studied civil engineering in the Sheffield Scientific School.

When he returned, he and his younger brother Albert worked for Robert Crichton Wyllie on his Princeville Plantation. Albert would later buy the Princeville Plantation near Hanalei. George leased and then bought Grove Farm from Hermann A. Widemann (1822–1899) starting in 1864. Using his engineering training, he designed an irrigation system to bring water from the wet mountains to the sugarcane fields, an idea later copied by many other planters. He continued to grow the farm, and invest in related enterprises, such as other plantations on other islands, a guano fertilizer company of his own, and the Inter-Island Steam Navigation Company.

In 1880 he was elected to the house of representatives of the legislature of the Hawaiian Kingdom. When the upper house (known as the House of Nobles) became an elected body in 1887, he served in it from 1888 to 1892. He was appointed as Minister of the Interior from November 8, 1892, to January 12, 1893. A few days later the overthrow of the Kingdom of Hawaii ended the monarchy. The upper house of the legislature then became the senate of the Republic of Hawaii where he was elected through 1898.

After World War I, when the US Army Corps of Engineers proposed building a harbor on the island, Wilcox bought the entire bond issue to finance Nawiliwili Harbor. He died January 21, 1933. Since he never married, his estate was left to his nephews and nieces. It was one of the largest estates in the territory at the time.

== Family and legacy ==
Younger brother Albert Spencer Wilcox was born May 24, 1844, married Luahiwa, and then Emma Mahelona, became a wealthy plantation owner and politician, and died July 7, 1919. Another younger brother Samuel Whitney Wilcox was born September 19, 1847, at Waiʻoli, married Emma Lyman (daughter of the Hilo missionaries), had six children, and died May 23, 1929. Although Samuel's youngest son Gaylord inherited the farm, his two prominent daughters were Elsie Hart Wilcox(1874–1954), who became the first female territorial senator of Hawaii, and Mabel Isabel Wilcox (1882–1978) who led the restoration of the Waiʻoli and Grove Farm houses into museums.

Wilcox Health and George Norton Wilcox Memorial Hospital are named for him; hospital founder Mabel Wilcox was a nurse and commissioner of public health.

The Grove Farm Company (incorporated in 1922) was kept in the family until it was sold to Stephen McConnell Case in 2000.

=== Family tree ===
Wilcox-Lyman family tree

Abner Wilcox (1808–1869)	Lucy Eliza Hart (1814–1869)	David Belden Lyman (1803–1868)	Sarah Joiner (1805–1885)	William Harrison Rice (1813–1862)
George Norton Wilcox (1839–1933)	Albert Spencer Wilcox (1844–1919)	Frederick S. Lyman (1837–1918)	Rufus Anderson Lyman (1842–1910)	William Hyde Rice (1846–1924)
Samuel Whitney Wilcox (1847–1929)	Emma Lyman (1849–1934)
Gaylord Parke Wilcox (1881–1970)	Ralph Lyman Wilcox (1876–1913)	Anna Charlotte Rice (born 1882)

== See also ==
- Grove Farm Sugar Plantation Museum

Government offices
Preceded by Charles T. Gulick	Kingdom of Hawaii Minister of the Interior; November 1892 – January 1893	Succeeded by John F. Colburn
