= Emma Kauikeōlani Wilcox =

Hawaiian socialite, philanthropist and civic leader

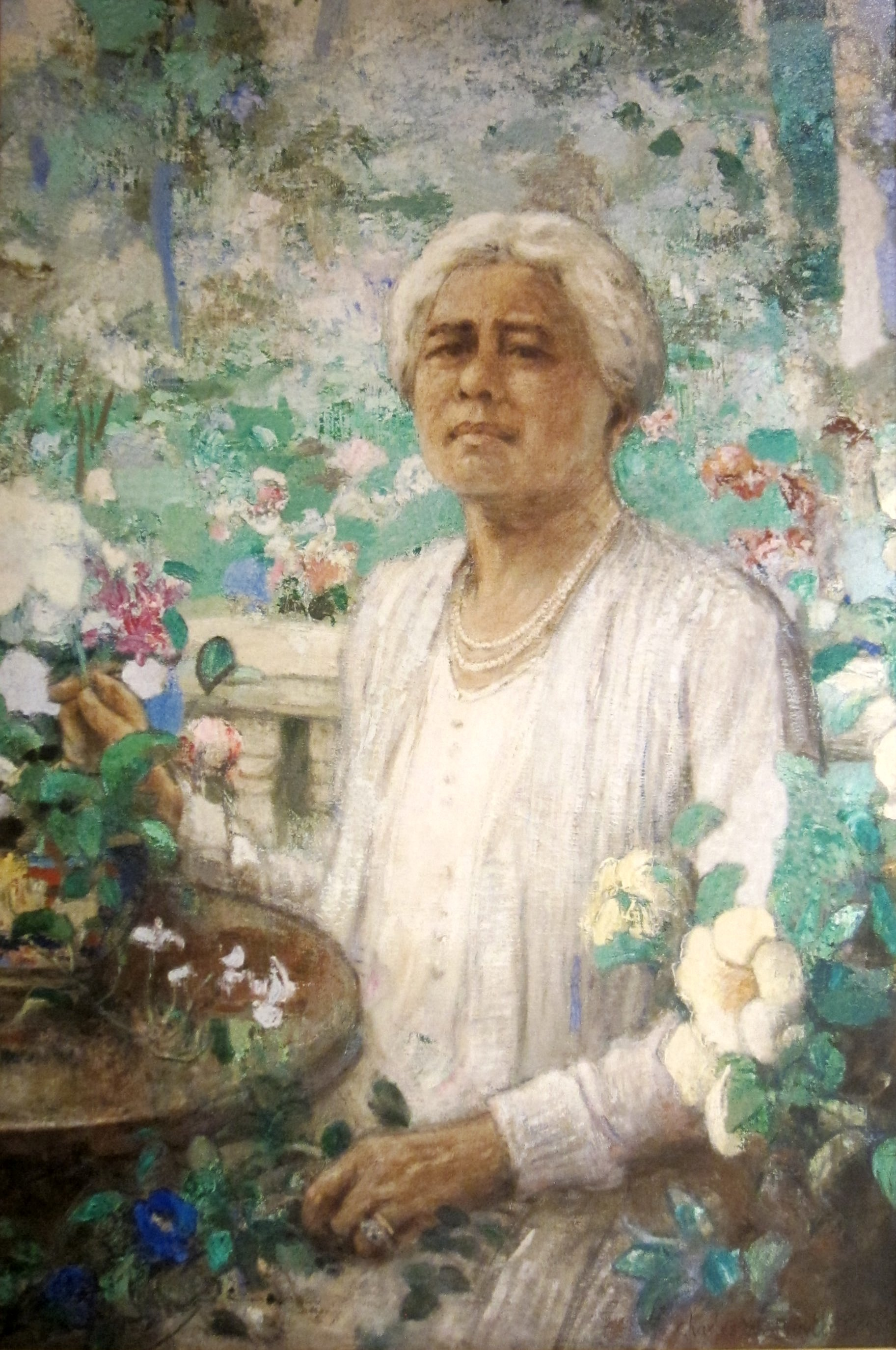
Portrait of Emma Kauikeōlani Wilcox by Charles W. Bartlett, 1929

Emma Kauikeōlani Napoleon Mahelona Wilcox (November 25, 1851 – October 22, 1931), was a socialite, philanthropist and civic leader from Hawaii. She is the namesake of Kauikeōlani Children's Hospital, and the founder of the Samuel Mahelona Memorial Hospital.

== Background ==
She was born of Corsican, Tahitian and Native Hawaiian ancestry in the Mililani area of the island of Oahu, and was raised in a house on Queen Street in Honolulu. She was the first of fifteen children born to Pamahoa and Temanihi “Nihi” Napoleon, a Honolulu fish merchant. Her mother Pamahoa was of Hawaiian ancestry, related to the family of Charles Kanaʻina, the father of King Lunalilo. Emma was educated at Kawaiahaʻo Seminary for Girls, becoming a teacher there after graduation. Early on in her life, Emma was motivated to help ease difficulties faced by the native Hawaiian population.

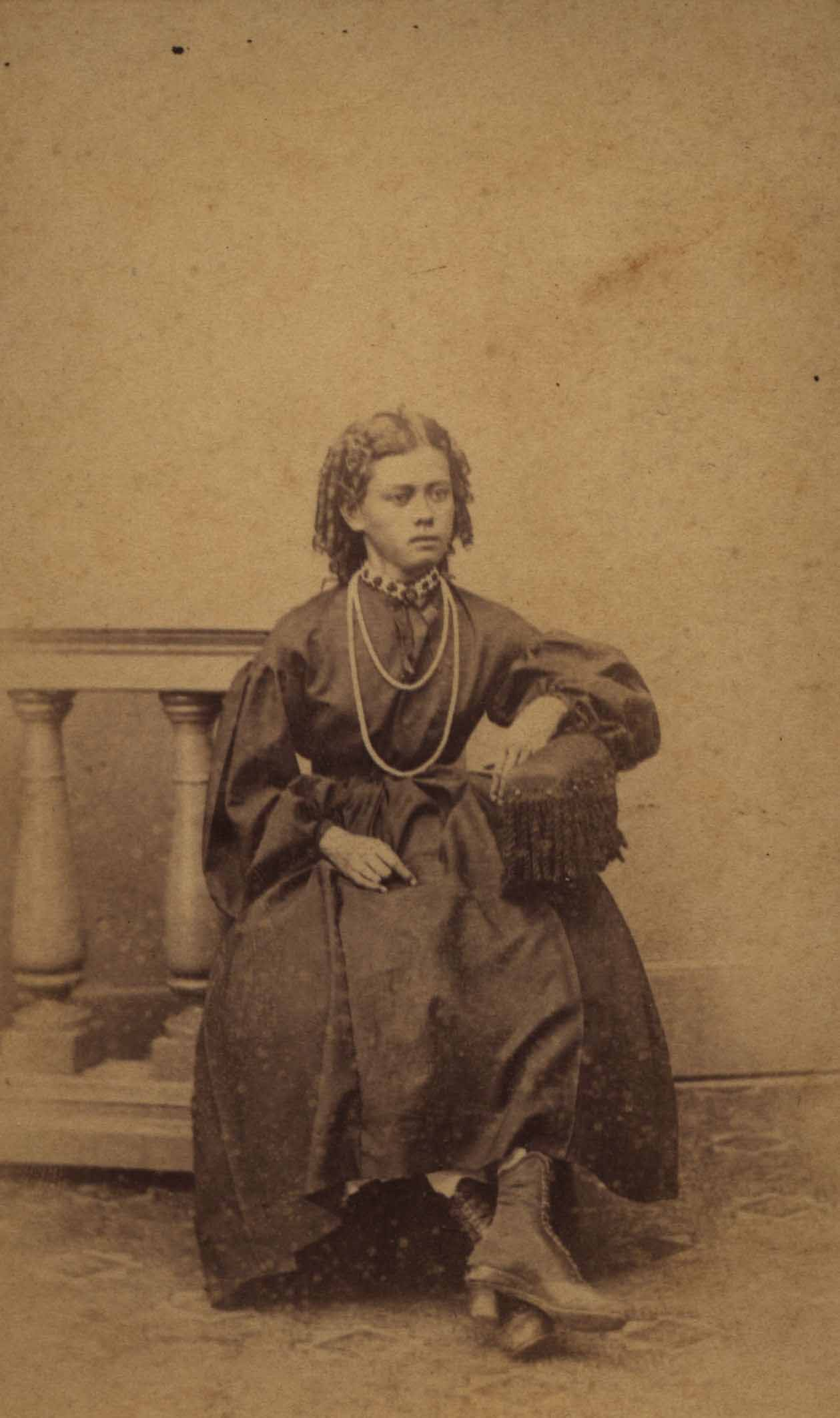
Possibly Emma Napoleon, photograph by Joseph W. King, 1869

Emma married the first time in 1882 to Samuel Kahekili Mahelona, the son of Judge Samuel Waimalu Mahelona. Educated at the Royal School, he had been an employee of Allen & Robinson on Kauai. Emma and Samuel were the parents of Samuel Hooker Kaleokalani, Ethel Kulamanu, Cushman Nehenuiokalani and Allen Clesson Kualuheimalama. The couple had ties to the monarchy and the political power structure of the Kingdom of Hawaii. Upon her husband's death in 1892, his funeral was attended by Queen Liliʻuokalani and her ladies in waiting, Governor of Oahu Archibald Scott Cleghorn and other kingdom dignitaries. In widowhood, she resumed her teaching career at Kawaiahaʻo.

In 1898, she married wealthy Kauai business man and politician Albert Spencer Wilcox, the son of missionaries Abner Wilcox and Lucy Eliza Hart. Their Kawaiahaʻo Church wedding ceremony was officiated by Rev. Henry Hodges Parker, and attended by the socially elite: Republic of Hawaii President Sanford B. Dole, Princess Kaʻiulani, Chief Justice Albert Francis Judd, politician Joseph Ballard Atherton, former Minister of Finance Peter Cushman Jones, the Rev. Charles McEwen Hyde and sugar baron Paul Isenberg. When Albert Wilcox died in 1919, less than $50,000 of his estimated $6 million estate was bequeathed to charitable organizations. Emma received half of the remainder, with the rest divided among his children. According to the terms of his will, the trustees of the estate were to see that Emma received "not less than $30,000 a year".

== Charitable endeavors ==
=== Kauikeōlani Children's Hospital ===
Her husband Albert supported her philanthropic community activities, and in 1908 donated land and $50,000 to erect the Kauikeōlani Children's Hospital in her honor. The institution was given her Hawaiian name which means “place in the skies (of) heaven”. In 1928, she donated a therapy swimming pool for the hospital's Shriner's Ward for crippled children. That year, she also donated $10,000, which was used to create a fund for needy patients who could not afford medical care on their own. A portrait of Emma painted by Charles W. Bartlett was donated to the hospital in 1929.

=== Samuel Mahelona Memorial Hospital ===
Her son Samuel Kaleookalani Mahelona died of tuberculosis at age 28 in 1912. To honor his memory, she founded the Samuel Mahelona Memorial Hospital on Kauai in 1917. Seed money was provided by Albert Wilcox and other business leaders of Hawaii.

=== Other ===
She was an active member of the Daughters of Hawaii, and a director of the YWCA in Honolulu. The Haili Church in Hilo was the recipient of a pipe organ through her generosity.

When Honolulu police officer William Kama was killed in the line of duty in 1928, leaving behind a widow and small children, Emma and Princess Abigail Campbell Kawānanakoa paid off the mortgage on the Kama house.

== Death ==
Emma Wilcox died of a cerebral hemorrhage on October 22, 1931. A memorial service was held in her home that same day, and her body was shipped back to Kauai that evening for burial.

Her estate was valued at just under $800,000. Of that, $60,000 was bequeathed to various charities.

== Bibliography ==
- Peterson, Barbara Bennett (1984). Notable women of Hawaii. University of Hawaii Press. ISBN 978-0-8248-0820-4.
- Pukui, Mary Kawena; Elbert, Samuel H.; Mookini, Esther T. (1974). Place Names of Hawaii. Honolulu: University of Hawaii Press. ISBN 978-0-8248-0524-1. OCLC 1042464.
