= Albert Spencer Wilcox =

American businessman

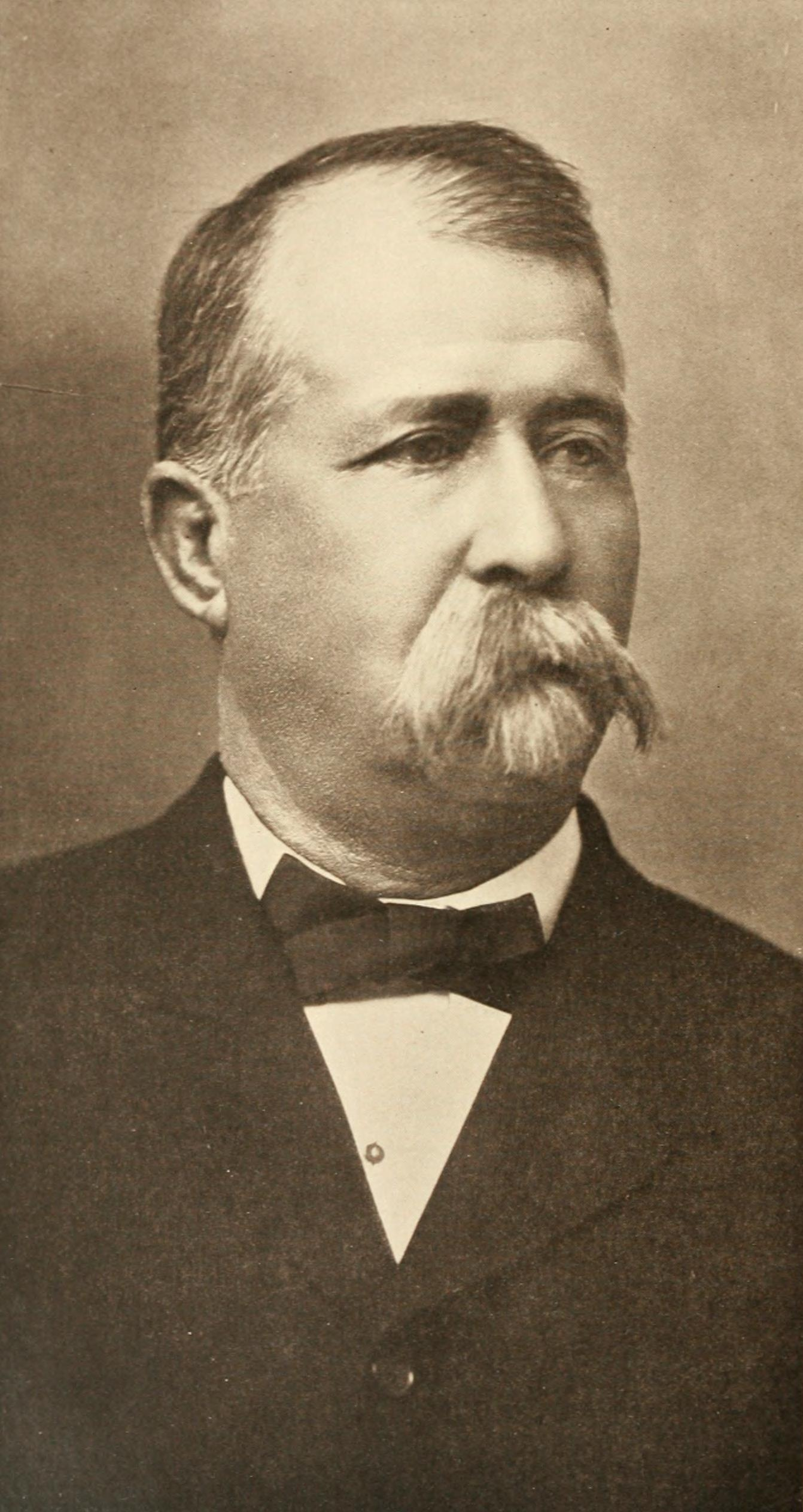
- Born: May 24, 1844; Hilo, Hawaii
- Died: July 7, 1919 (aged 75); Puhi, Hawaii
- Occupations: Planter, Businessman, Politician
- Parent(s): Abner Wilcox; Lucy Eliza Hart

Albert Spencer Wilcox (May 24, 1844 – July 7, 1919) was a businessman and politician in the Kingdom of Hawaii and Republic of Hawaii. He developed several sugar plantations in Hawaii, and became a large landholder.

== Early life ==
Albert Spencer Wilcox was born in Hilo, Hawaii, on May 24, 1844. His father was Abner Wilcox (1808–1869) and mother was Lucy Eliza Hart (1814–1869). His parents were in the eighth company of missionaries to Hawaii for the American Board of Commissioners for Foreign Missions. His parents taught at the Hilo Mission boarding school founded by David Belden Lyman and his wife. He had three older brothers born while at Hilo. In 1846, the family moved to teach at a similar school at the Waiʻoli Mission near Hanalei, Hawaii, on the northern coast of the island of Kauaʻi. There he had four more brothers, although one died young.

In 1851, he sailed to Boston with his father for surgery to fix a birth defect in his foot. He was educated at his parents' school and Punahou School in Honolulu from 1858 to 1862. He worked with his older brother George Norton Wilcox (1839–1933) on the Princeville plantation owned by Robert Crichton Wyllie in the 1860s while living at Waiʻoli.

== Business ==
Wilcox started a small plantation in Waipā Valley but it failed by 1876. Paul Isenberg installed a sugar mill at Hanamāʻulu in 1877 and hired Wilcox to be its manager. He continued to run the plantation for over two decades. With a reliable source of irrigation, and the Reciprocity Treaty of 1875 removing sugar tariffs to the US, he became wealthy.

He invested in a mill in the remote western area of Kekaha, to process the sugar grown by Valdemar Knudsen in the 1880s. On February 7, 1883, he incorporated the Inter-Island Steam Navigation Company and served as a director. By 1895 he was able to buy Princeville and turn it into a ranch. He also invested in real estate in Honolulu.

== Politics ==
Wilcox was elected as a representative from Kauaʻi to the legislature of the Hawaiian Kingdom from 1887 through 1892. He was involved in drafting the 1887 Constitution of the Kingdom of Hawaii, and its forceful imposition which put his brother George into the cabinet of King Kalākaua. On January 14, 1893, he was appointed to the Committee of Safety but resigned at the first meeting to return and take care of business on Kauaʻi. Some of his neighbors from Kauaʻi such as William Owen Smith and Sanford B. Dole played major roles in the overthrow of the Kingdom of Hawaii.

== Later life and legacy ==
Wilcox married Mary Luahiwa, but they divorced. On June 7, 1898, he married Emma Kauikeolani Napoleon Mahelona (1862–1931), and retired to an estate called Kilohana in Puhi, Hawaii, at 21°58′15″N 159°23′29″W. His stepdaughter Ethel Kulamanu Mahelona married his nephew Gaylord Parke Wilcox (1881–1970) and inherited Kilohana. It is the site of one of the heritage railways in Kauai.

He built a beach house in Hanalei at 22°12′34″N 159°29′44″W directly on the shore of Hanalei Bay near the Hanalei Pier. It was built as a complex of main house, three garages, a boathouse, and separate cottages for gardener, caretaker, and other servants. It later was consolidated into a sprawling single story building with six bedrooms and six bathrooms, with a few remaining cottages. The beach house was added to the National Register of Historic Places listings in Hawaii on July 30, 1993, as Albert Spencer Wilcox Beach House. The Hanalei Land Company, which Wilcox formed in 1903, restored the house and rents it to visitors as accommodations or events such as weddings. It has been kept in the Wilcox family for six generations.

The Albert Spencer Wilcox Building in Lihue, Hawaii, is also listed on the National Register.

In 1908, he and his wife sponsored the Kauikeolani Children's Hospital in Honolulu. It became part of the Kapi'olani Medical Center for Women & Children in 1978. In 1917 he donated funds for a hospital named for his stepson Samuel Mahelona, who had died from tuberculosis on October 20, 1912. It is the oldest hospital on Kauaʻi. Allen Clessen Mahelona was another stepson. Wilcox died July 7, 1919.

In 1922, his widow donated funds for the Albert Spencer Wilcox Building designed by Hart Wood to be the first public library on Kauaʻi. It now houses the Kauaʻi Museum.

=== Family tree ===
Wilcox-Lyman family tree

Abner Wilcox (1808–1869) | Lucy Eliza Hart (1814–1869) | David Belden Lyman (1803–1868) | Sarah Joiner (1805–1885) | William Harrison Rice (1813–1862)
George Norton Wilcox (1839–1933) | Albert Spencer Wilcox (1844–1919) | Frederick S. Lyman (1837–1918) | Rufus Anderson Lyman (1842–1910) | William Hyde Rice (1846–1924)
Samuel Whitney Wilcox (1847–1929) | Emma Lyman (1849–1934)
Gaylord Parke Wilcox (1881–1970) | Ralph Lyman Wilcox (1876–1913) | Anna Charlotte Rice (born 1882)
