= Abner Wilcox =

American missionary (1808-69)

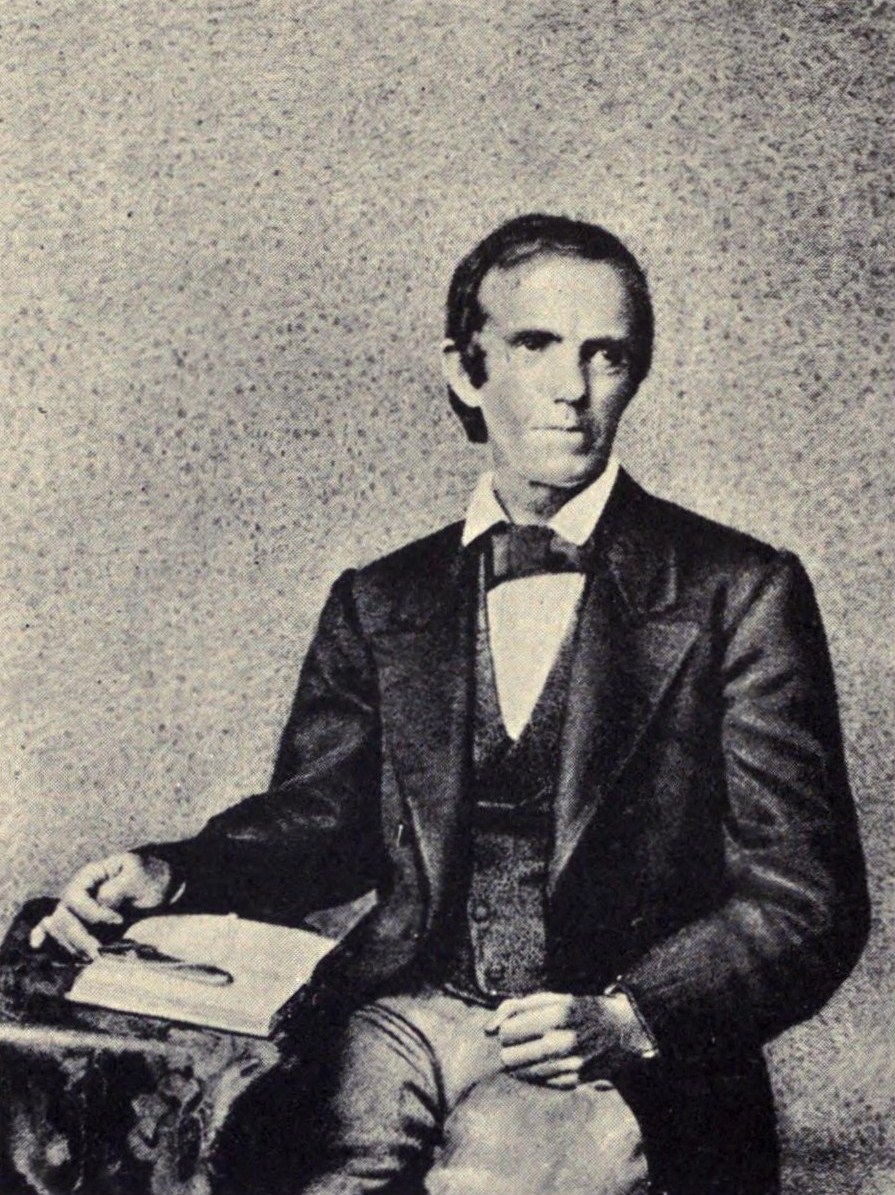
- Born: April 19, 1808; Harwinton, Connecticut
- Died: August 20, 1869 (aged 61); Colebrook, Connecticut
- Occupation: Educator

Abner Wilcox (April 19, 1808 – August 20, 1869) was a missionary teacher from New England in the Kingdom of Hawaii.

== Life ==
Abner Wilcox was born April 19, 1808, in Harwinton, Connecticut. His father was Aaron Wilcox (1770–1850) and mother was Lois Phelps. He was fourth of nine children. On November 23, 1836, he married Lucy Eliza Hart who was born November 17, 1814, in Cairo, New York. They were assigned to be in the eighth company of missionaries to Hawaii for the American Board of Commissioners for Foreign Missions. They sailed from Boston on December 14, 1836, on the bark Mary Frasier and arrived in Honolulu on April 9, 1837. Also on this voyage were missionaries Amos Starr Cooke and Samuel Northrup Castle, founders of Castle & Cooke. The Wilcoxes taught at the Hilo Mission boarding school founded by David Belden Lyman and his wife on the Island of Hawaiʻi. They had four sons born while at Hilo.

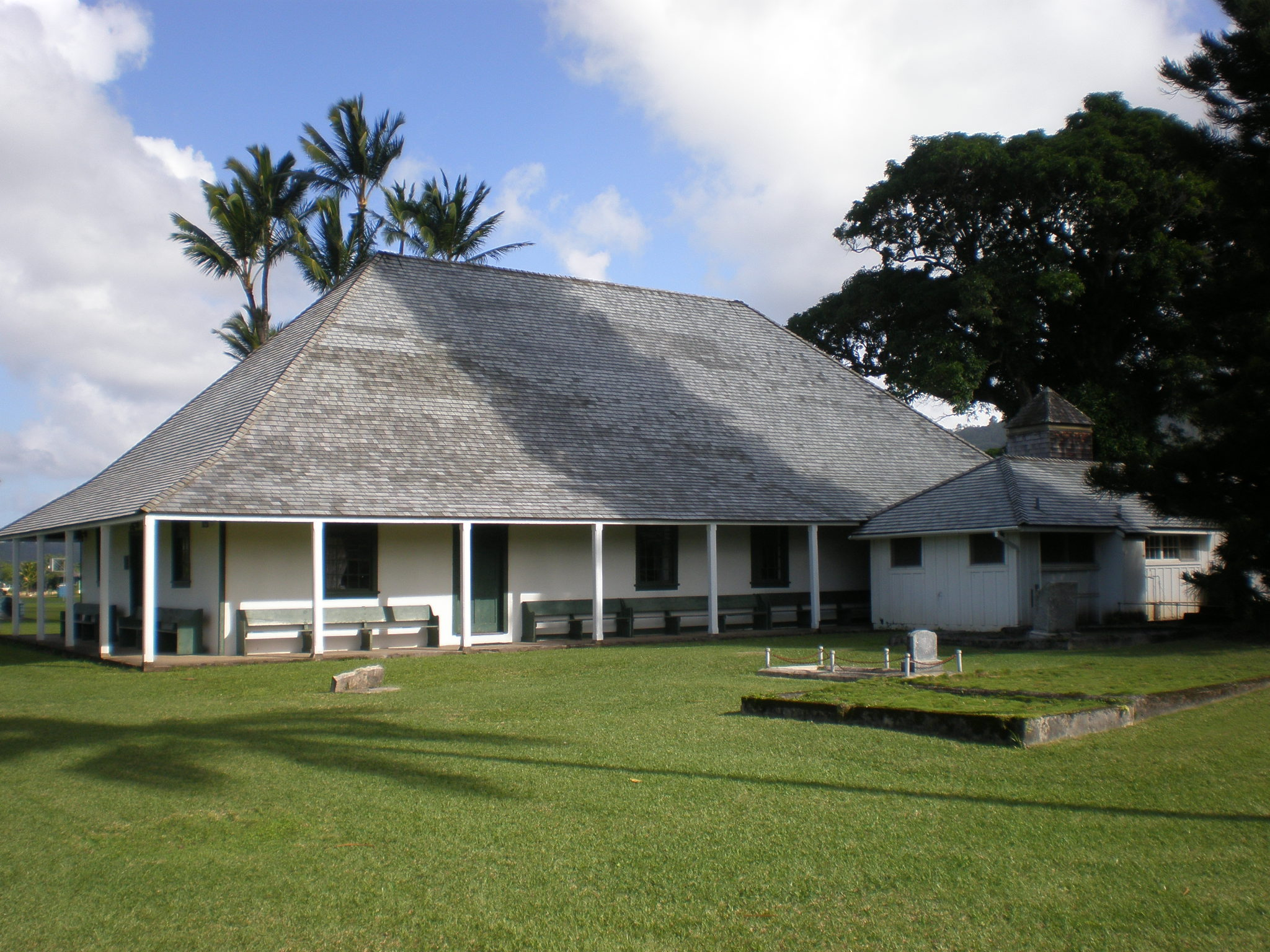
Restored Waiʻoli Mission Hall

In 1845 they moved to Waialua on the island of Oʻahu. In 1846 the family moved to teach at a similar school at the Waiʻoli Mission near Hanalei, Hawaii, on the northern coast of the island of Kauaʻi. There they had four more sons, although one died young.

His wife died August 13, 1869, and he died one week later on August 20, 1869, in Colebrook, Connecticut, on a visit to relatives. They were buried at Colebrook. In the Hawaiian language the family was known as Wilikoki.

Children were:

1. Charles Hart Wilcox was born April 8, 1838, in Hilo, married Frances A. Van Water (1846–1917), had four children, and died September 25, 1888, in Oroville, California.
2. George Norton Wilcox (1839–1933) became an Engineer, politician, and businessman.
3. Edward Payson Wilcox was born September 2, 1841, in Hilo, married Mary P. H. Rockwell, moved to Winsted, Connecticut, and died on July 23, 1919.
4. Albert Spencer Wilcox (1844–1919) became a businessman and politician.
5. Samuel Whitney Wilcox was born September 19, 1847, at Waiʻoli, married Emma Washburn Lyman (daughter of the Hilo missionaries) on October 7, 1874, served in the legislature of the Territory of Hawaii from 1901 through 1905, and died on May 23, 1929, in Honolulu. Their two sons inherited their uncle George's estate including Grove Farm. Ralph Lyman Wilcox (1876–1913) married Anna Charlotte Rice, daughter of William Hyde Rice and granddaughter of missionary William Harrison Rice on February 17, 1903. Gaylord Parke Wilcox (1881–1970) in 1909 married Ethel Kulamanu Mahelona, stepdaughter of his uncle Albert Wilcox. Their estate called Kilohana is now a tourist attraction.
6. William Luther Wilcox was born July 8, 1850, at Waiʻoli, married native Hawaiian Kahuila from Molokaʻi, became a judge, and died July 12, 1903.
7. Clarence Sheldon Wilcox was born November 14, 1855, at Waiʻoli, but died less than a year later on September 8, 1856.
8. Henry Harrison Wilcox was born March 23, 1858, at Waiʻoli, married Mary Theodosia Green (1865–1936), granddaughter of missionary Jonathan Smith Green (but they had no children), and committed suicide January 11, 1899, after a painful illness.

In 1912 Sam, George, and Albert Wilcox donated funds for a new church at Waiʻoli, and the old one was converted to a hall.

He was no relation to Robert William Wilcox (1855–1903) who was a military commander in several rebellions and then first delegate to US Congress from Hawaii.

== Family tree ==
Wilcox-Lyman family tree

Abner Wilcox (1808–1869)	Lucy Eliza Hart (1814–1869)	David Belden Lyman (1803–1868)	Sarah Joiner (1805–1885)	William Harrison Rice (1813–1862)
George Norton Wilcox (1839–1933)	Albert Spencer Wilcox (1844–1919)	Frederick S. Lyman (1837–1918)	Rufus Anderson Lyman (1842–1910)	William Hyde Rice (1846–1924)
Samuel Whitney Wilcox (1847–1929)	Emma Lyman (1849–1934)
Gaylord Parke Wilcox (1881–1970)	Ralph Lyman Wilcox (1876–1913)	Anna Charlotte Rice (born 1882)
