= Waiʻoli Mission District =

Historic district in Hawaii, United States

- U.S. National Register of Historic Places
- U.S. Historic district
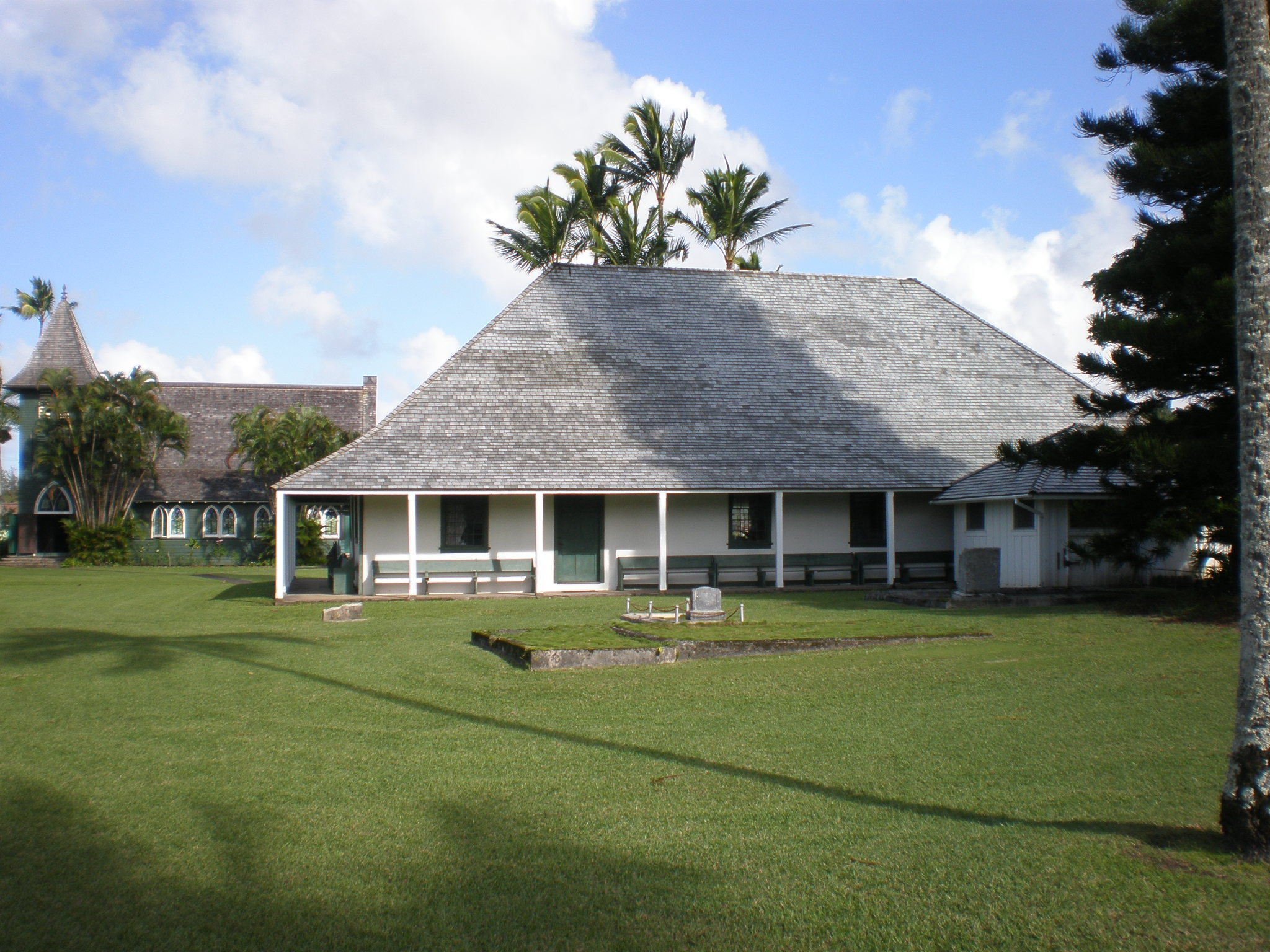
- Church and Mission Hall

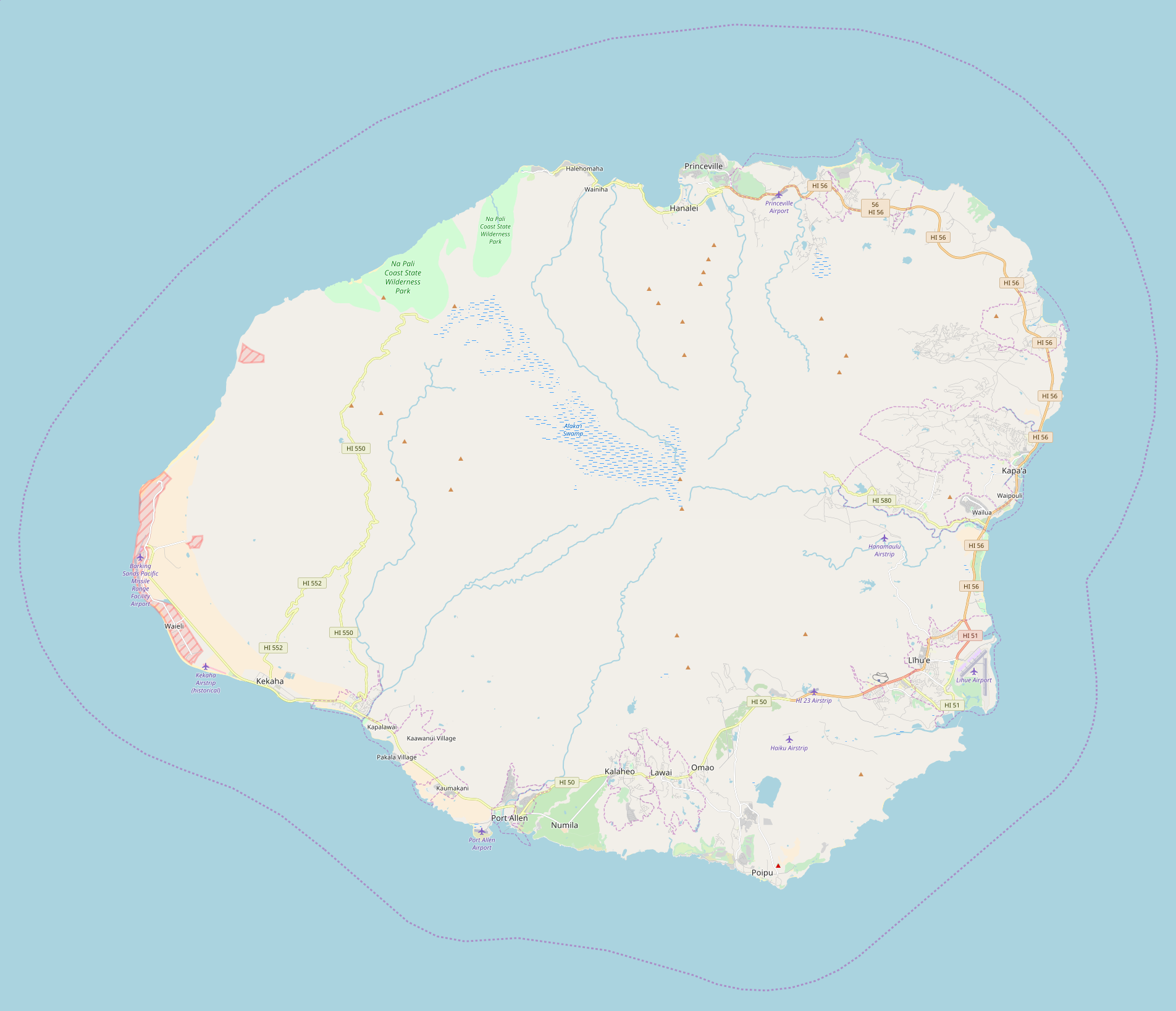
- Location within Kauai Location within Hawaii
- Location: Off Route 560, Hanalei, Hawaii
- Coordinates: 22°12′4″N 159°30′4″W
- Area: 17 acres (6.9 ha)
- Built: 1832
- Architect: Hart Wood
- Architectural style: Gothic
- NRHP reference No.: 73000676
- Added to NRHP: October 3, 1973

The Waiʻoli Mission District at Hanalei Bay, on Route 560 along the north shore of the island of Kauaʻi, is the site of a historic mission. The first permanent missionaries to the area arrived in 1834, and the district was added to the National Register of Historic Places in 1973.

The building is known as Wai‘oli Mission House and is now a museum open to the public.

== Description ==
Wai ʻoli means "joyful water" or "singing river" in the Hawaiian language. In 1824, after the royal yacht Haʻaheo o Hawaiʻi ("Pride of Hawaii") ran aground in the bay, a crowd gathered for an attempt at salvage. Reverend Hiram Bingham took the opportunity to preach a sermon.

Around 1832, a thatched hut was built in this area for the missionaries to Hawaii from the American Board of Commissioners for Foreign Missions who would visit from other missions in the Hawaiian Islands, such as the one at Waimea, Kauaʻi. Early supporters were island governor Kaikioewa and Queen Dowager Deborah Kapule. The first permanent pastor was Reverend William Patterson Alexander (1805–1884), with his wife Mary Ann McKinney Alexander (1810–1888) who arrived in 1834. By then the original temporary structure had to be rebuilt. Alexander also started building a wood-framed house about 1835. Their son Samuel Thomas Alexander was born here.

After the second thatched church blew down in an 1837 storm, a frame building was begun and finished in 1841. The new church was a single rectangular structure 35 feet (11 m) by 70 feet (21 m). Alexander also expanded his house for his growing family. While most mission houses are built in the New England style (including the interiors), this house shows influence of the Southern States. This is attributed to Alexander being born in Paris, Kentucky. Edward Johnson and his wife Lois Hoyt Johnson arrived in 1837 and opened a school. In 1843 George Berkeley Rowell (1815–1884) and his wife Malvina Jerusha Chapin Rowell (1816–1901) arrived and the Alexanders moved to Lahainaluna School. Abner Wilcox (1808–1869) and Lucy Eliza Hart Wilcox (1814–1869) arrived in 1847 as teachers after the Rowells moved to Waimea. Johnson became pastor of the church.

By the end of the 1840s, the American Board removed funding for the missions and formed a Hawaiian Evangelical Association which tried to raise funds with small farms at each site. After the Great Mahele the Wilcox family obtained fee simple title to the property. The mission school became the Hanalei Public School. Abner and Lucy Wilcox both died while visiting relatives in Colebrook, Connecticut, in August 1869. Albert Spencer Wilcox lived in the house until 1877.

In 1912 the current church building was built with donations from Sam, George, and Albert Wilcox (sons of the missionary couple, they were born at the station). The old 1841 church was used as the Mission Hall. The old mission bell was used in the belfry. In 1921 Wilcox descendants funded architect Hart Wood to restore the Mission House and the Mission Hall. By 1945 it merged with the Anini Church and the Haena Church to become the Huiʻia Church. Some of Abner Wilcox's library can still be seen in his study. In 1957 the Congregational Church organization became the United Church of Christ. Hui ʻia means "united" in the Hawaiian language.

The district includes 17 acres (6.9 ha) with the 1836 mission house, two caretaker cottages, and a garage, in addition to the 1841 Hall and 1912 Church. The house now is a small private museum.

== Gallery ==
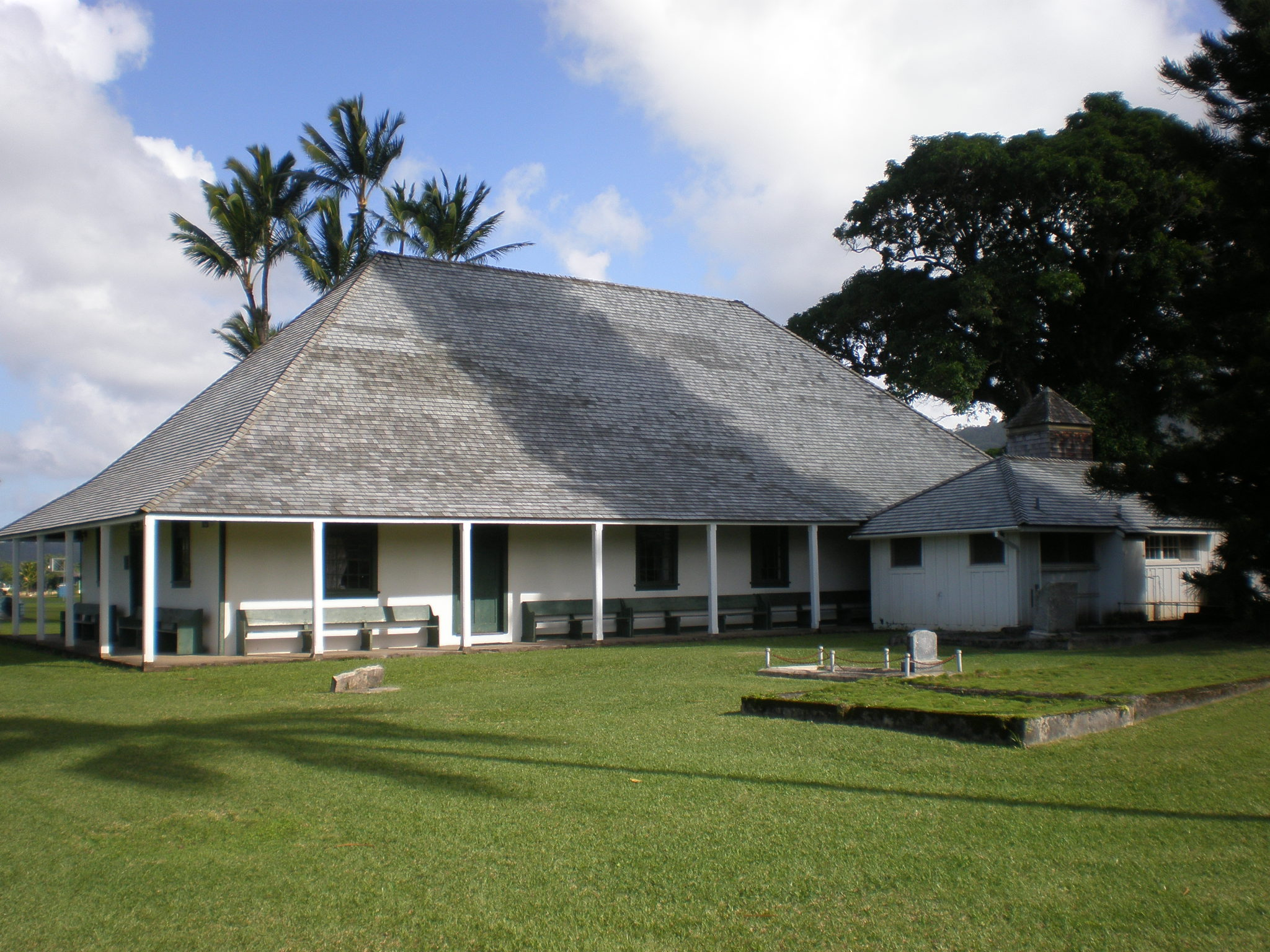
Waiʻoli Mission Hall (1841)

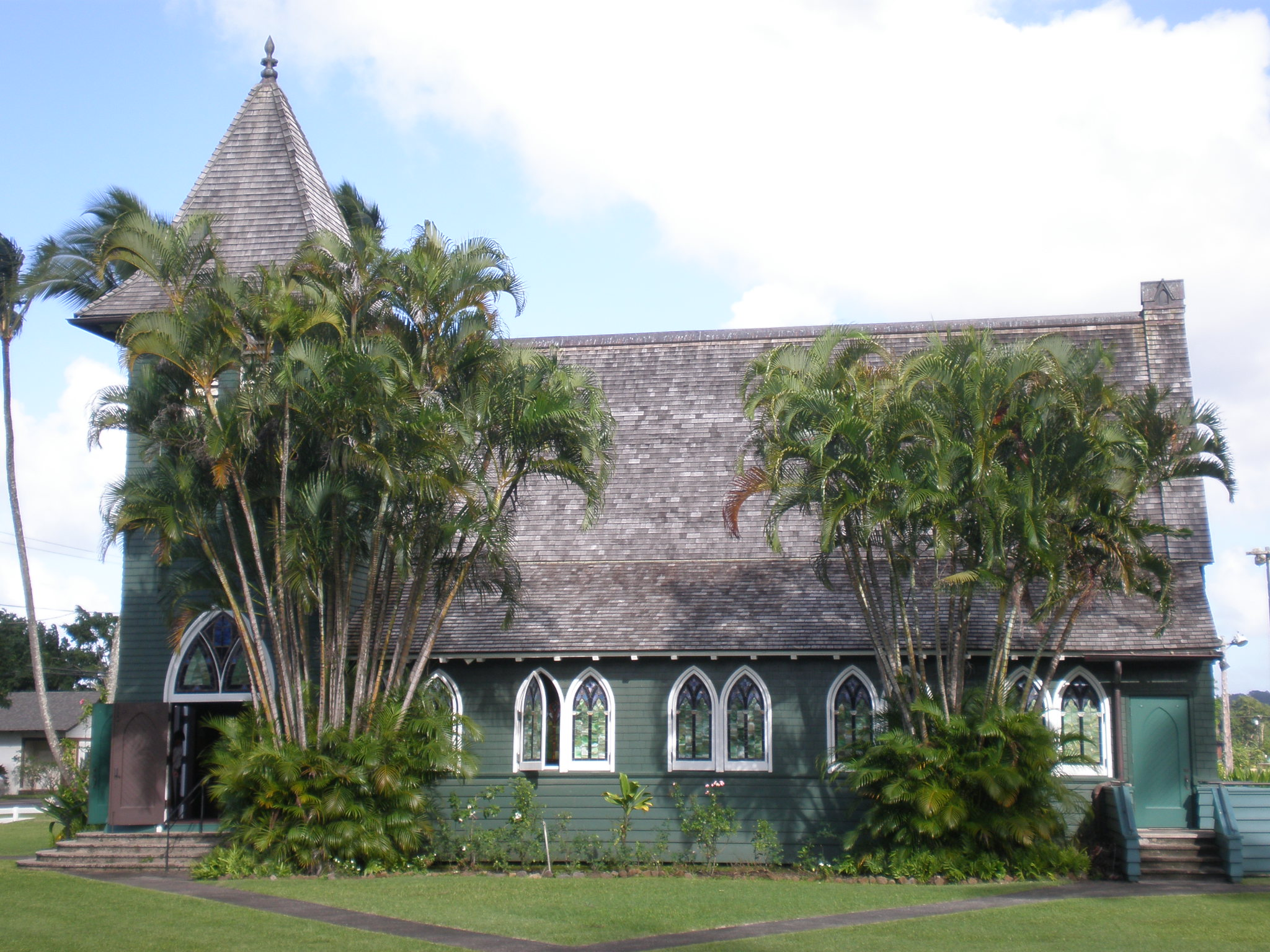
Huiʻia Church building (1912)

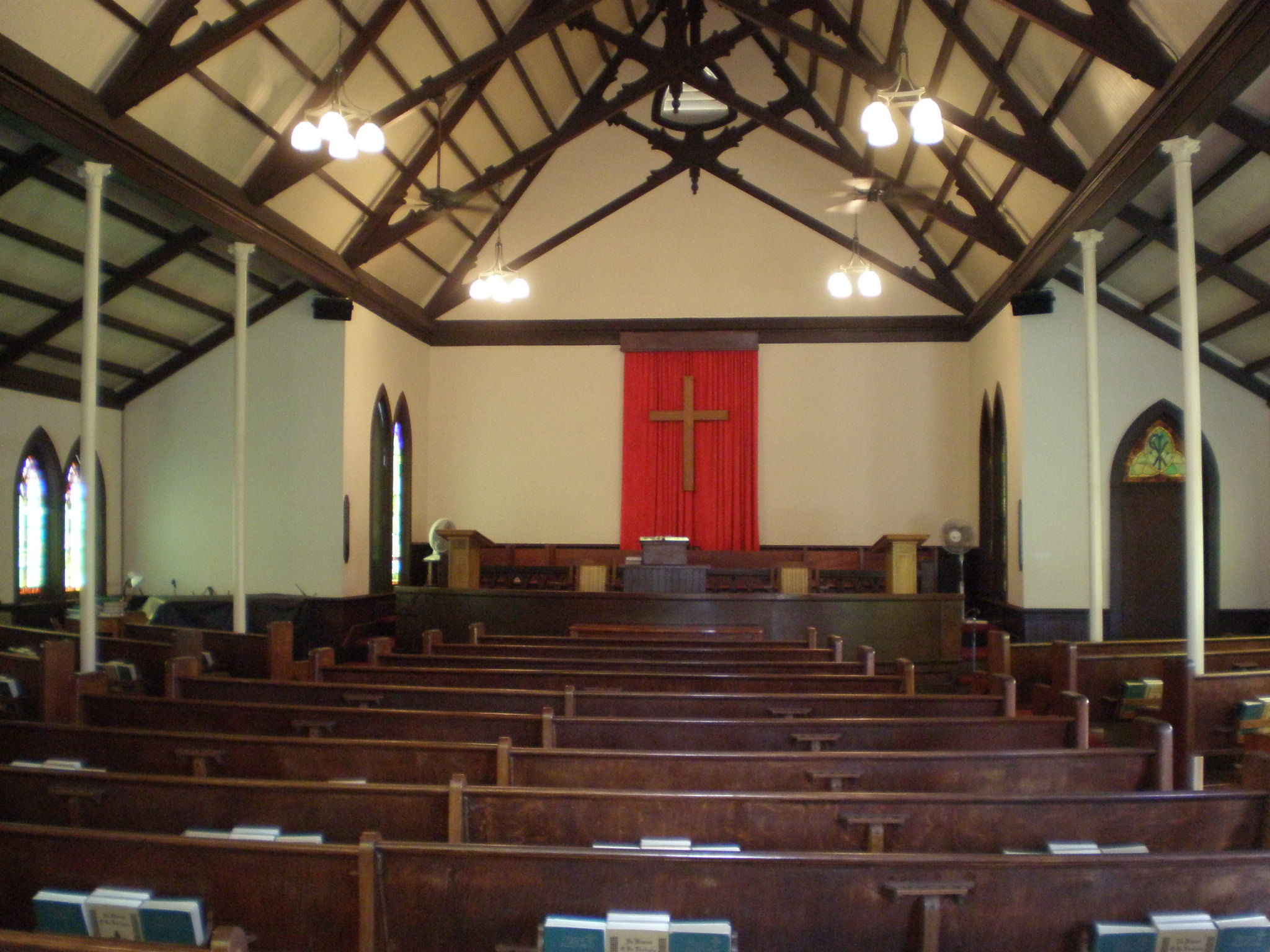
Huiʻia Church sanctuary (1912)

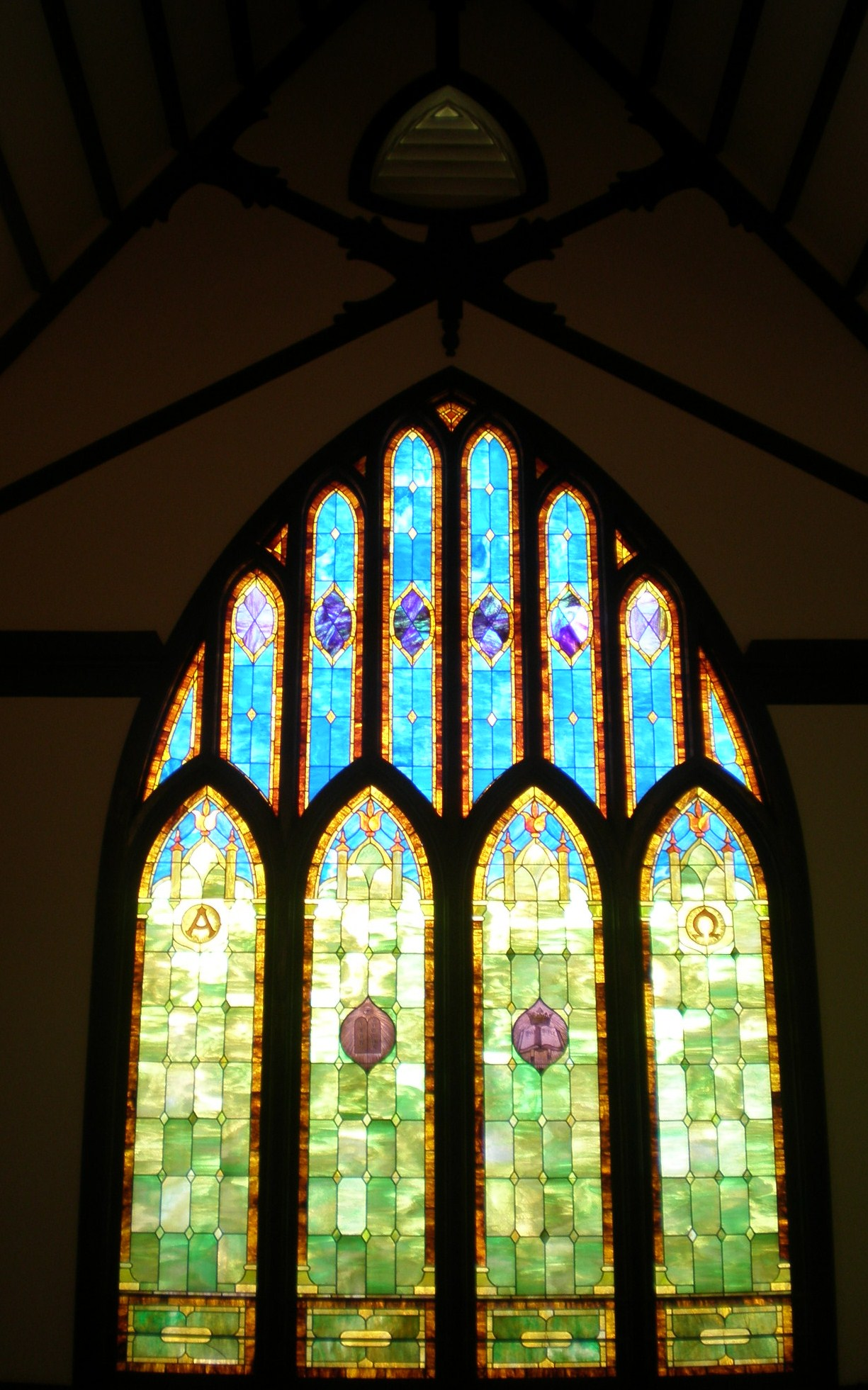
Huiʻia Church stained glass window (1912)

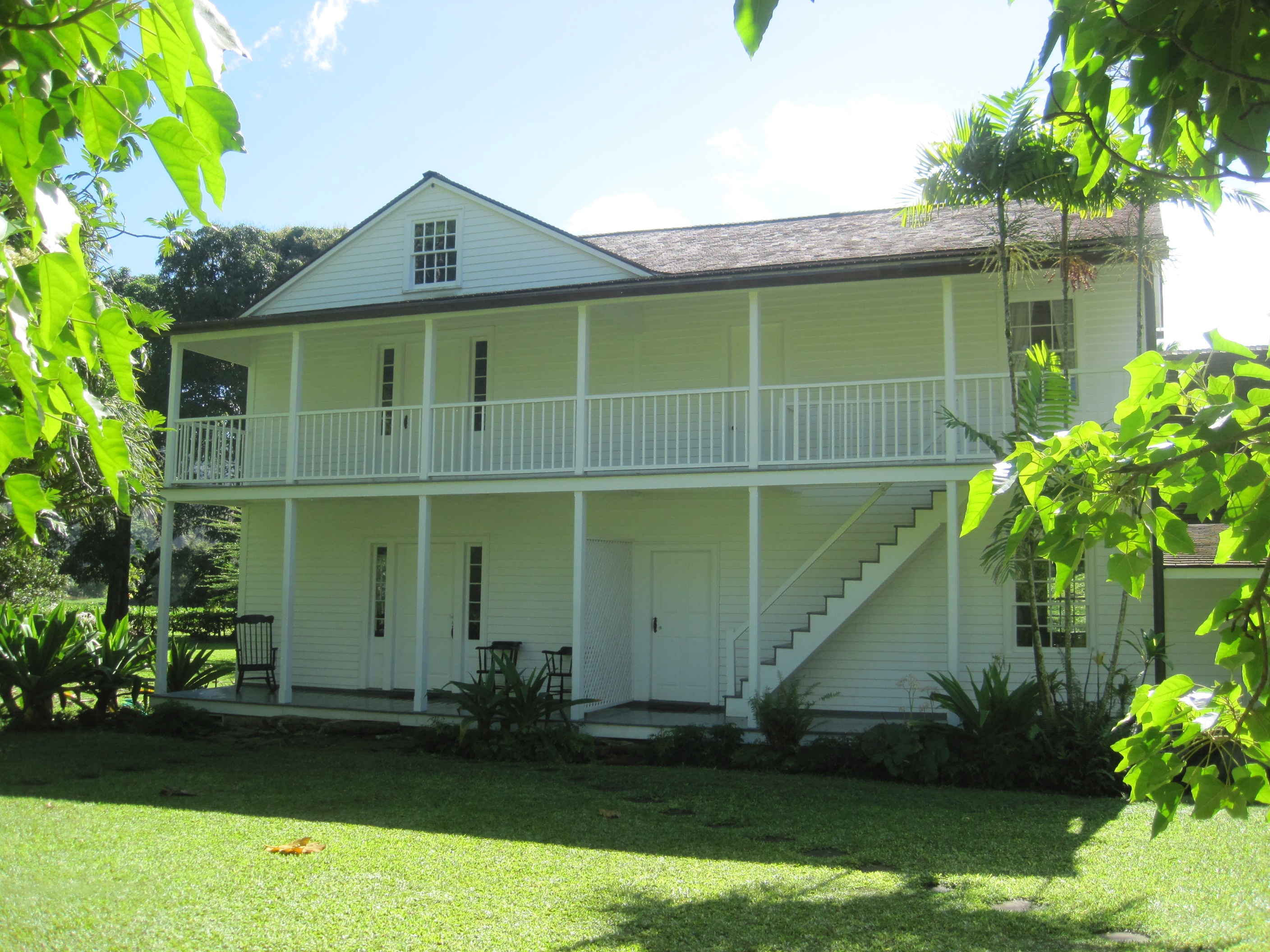
Waiʻoli Mission house front (1836)

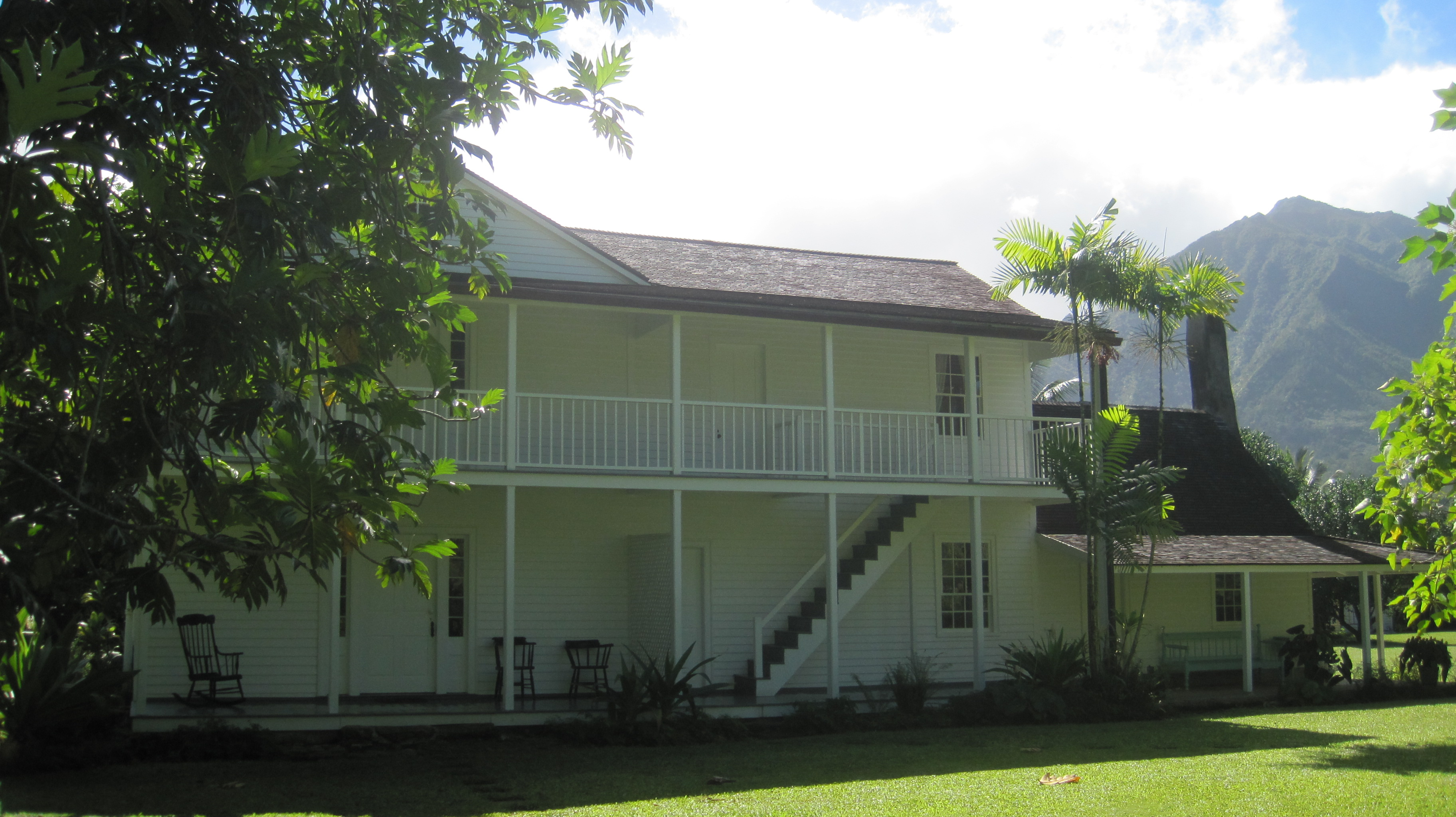
Waiʻoli Mission house with kitchen and mountain view (1836)

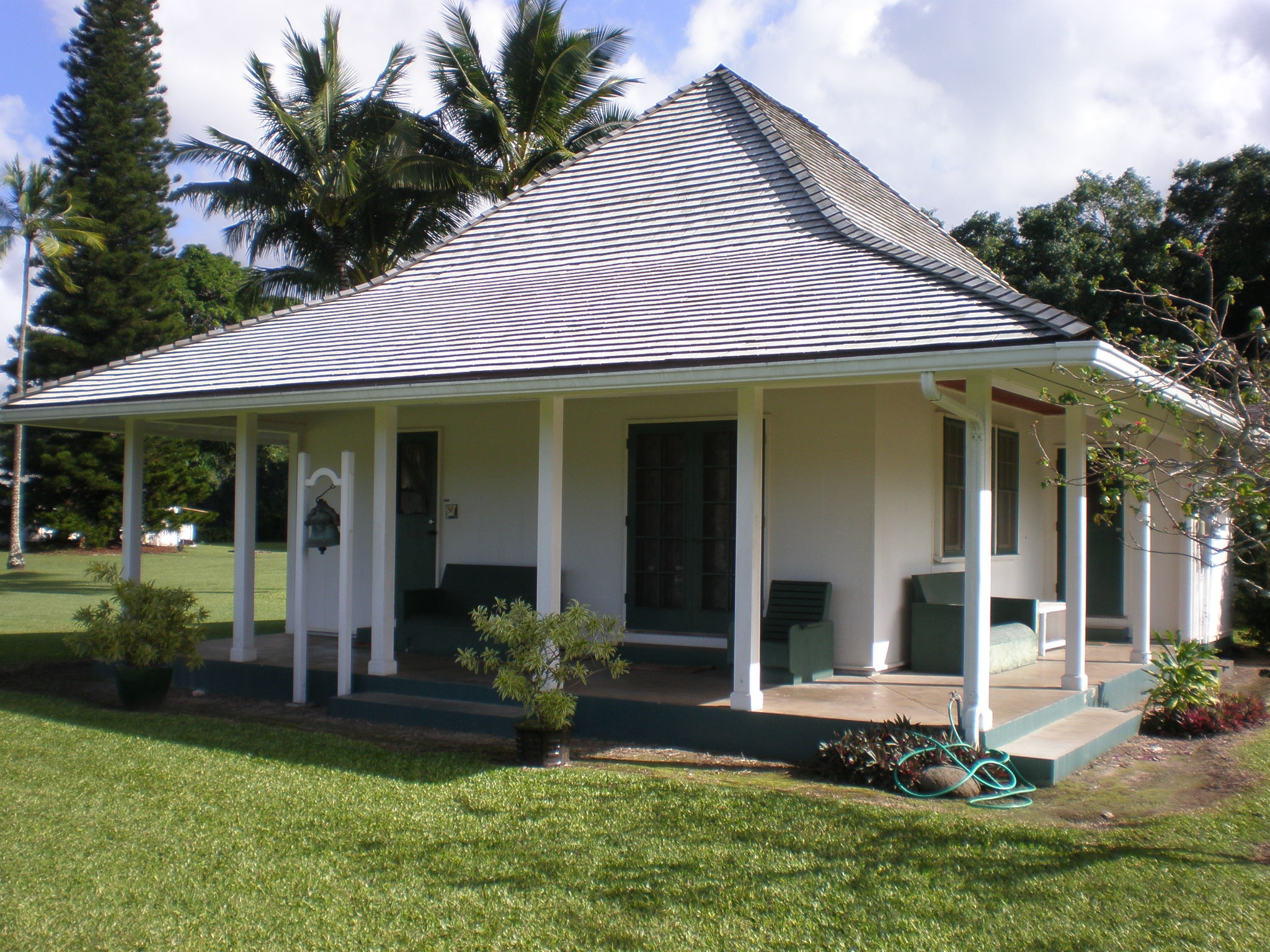
Waiʻoli Mission office

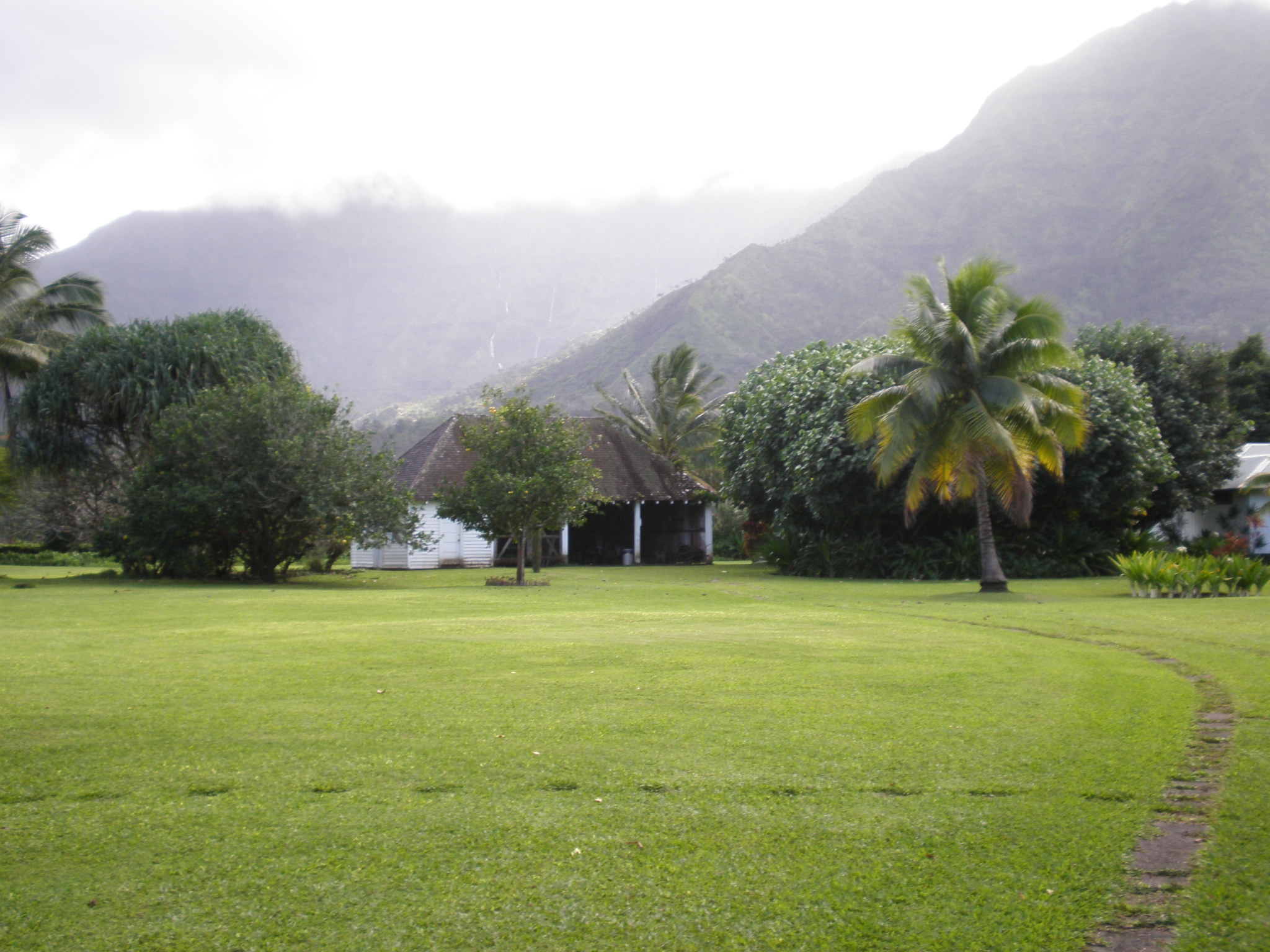
Waiʻoli Mission work shed & grounds
