= David Belden Lyman =

American missionary to Hawaii

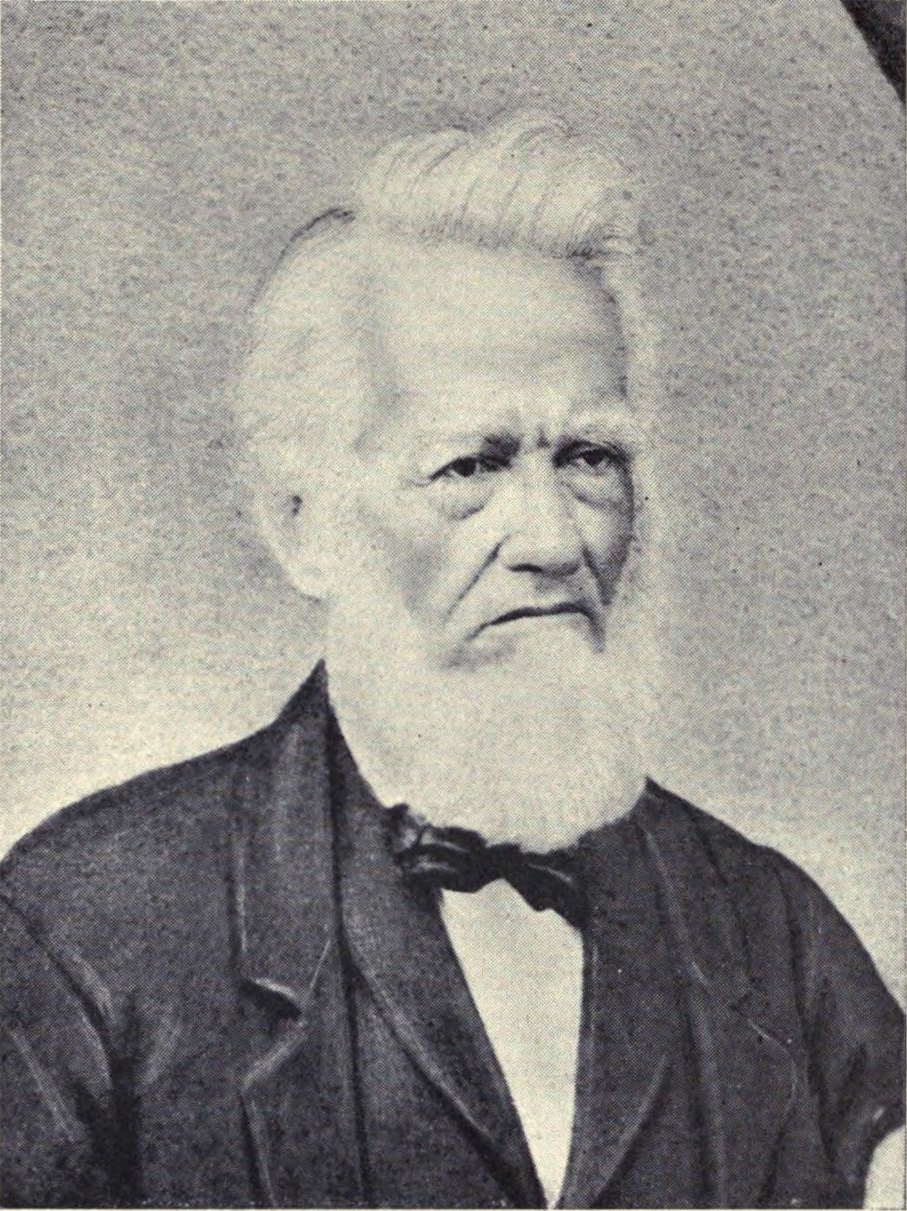
- Founder of Hilo Boarding School
- Born: July 28, 1803; Hartford, Connecticut
- Died: October 4, 1884 (aged 81); Hilo, Hawaii
- Occupations: Missionary, Teacher
- Spouse: Sarah Joiner
- Parent(s): David Lyman; Rhoda Phelps Belden

Sarah Joiner Lyman
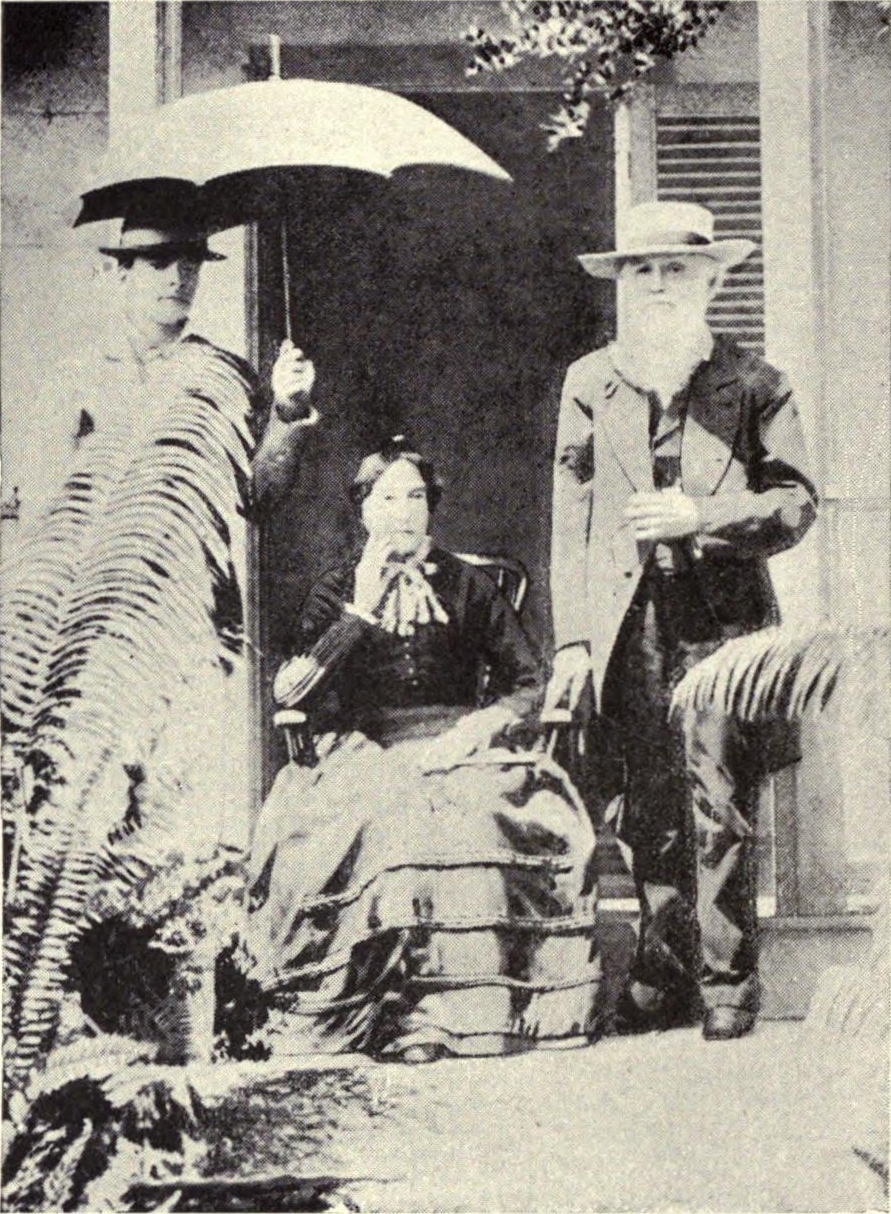
- Born: November 29, 1805; Royalton, Vermont
- Died: December 7, 1885 (aged 80); Hilo, Hawaii
- Occupations: Missionary, Teacher
- Children: Frederick Swartz; Rufus Anderson six others
- Parent(s): Salmon Joiner; Mary Moore

David Belden Lyman (July 28, 1803 – October 4, 1884) was an early American missionary to Hawaii who opened a boarding school for Hawaiians. His wife Sarah Joiner Lyman (1805–1885) taught at the boarding school and kept an important journal. They had several notable descendants.

== Family life ==
David Belden Lyman was born in on July 28, 1803, in Hartford, Connecticut. from a family with a long Puritan history. He attended Lenox Academy and Williams College from 1824 to 1828. He then went to Andover Seminary and graduated and was ordained on October 12, 1831. He married Sarah Joiner (1806–1885) on November 2, 1831. Only a few days later they sailed from Massachusetts in the fifth company of missionaries from the American Board of Commissioners for Foreign Missions to Hawaii. They reached Honolulu in May 1832.

They had eight children including sons David Brainerd (1833–1836), Henry Munson (1835–1904), Frederick Swartz (1837–1918), another David Brainerd (1840–1914), Rufus Anderson (1842–1910), and Francis Ogden (1847–1915). Daughters were Ellen Elizabeth (1845–1868) and Emma Washburn (1849–1934).

David Belden Lyman died in Hilo, Hawaii on October 4, 1884. Sarah died on December 7, 1885.

== Hilo ==
After arriving in Honolulu, they were assigned to work at the mission in Hilo under Reverend Joseph Goodrich. The Scottish botanist and explorer David Douglas stayed with the Lymans between his historic climb to the summit of Mauna Loa, and his death exploring Mauna Kea in 1834. Mrs. Lyman made a note in her diary about the unusual customs of drinking hot coffee, tea, and "English dinners". Sarah Joiner Lyman's journal recorded earthquakes felt in Hilo and volcanic eruptions of Kilauea and Mauna Loa. It was used as an informative record on the frequency and strength of tremors and of volcanic activity for subsequent researchers. Mrs. Lyman kept it between 1833 and her death in 1885, and it was later maintained by other members of the Lyman family up to 1917. The journal was referenced during Mrs. Lyman's lifetime by members of the United States Exploring Expedition in 1840. She also published a letter in the American Journal of Science.

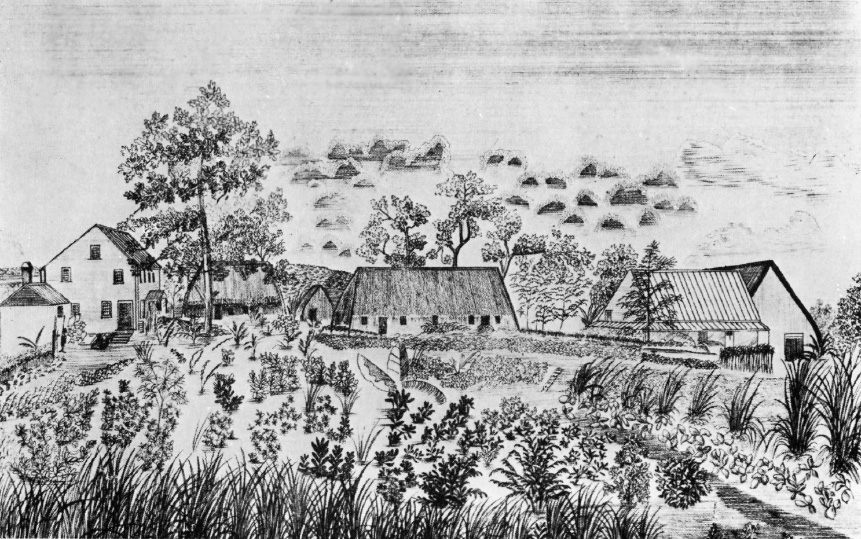
First campus of the school in 1836

Titus Coan and his wife Fidelia arrived in 1836 and officially took over preaching duties at the Haili church. However, Rev. Coan was often traveling through nearby districts, and Lyman continued to run the church during these trips. Lorrin Andrews had established the Lahainaluna Seminary in 1831, but primary and secondary schools were also needed on each island. The small school that had operated since 1828 in Hilo could only handle about 60-70 students. The Lymans founded the Hilo Boarding School in 1836 with a grant of $500. After the first year, only $140 of the grant was spent on two grass huts for only about 12 boarders. By 1837, six graduates were sent to the seminary and the school continued to expand.

In 1838, the students were put to work on another project: building a new wood-framed building for the school and a house for the Lyman family. Mrs. Lyman opened a school for girls in 1839. Students tended a garden to grow their own food, and to raise some cash crops to support expenses. By 1840 thousands of pounds of sugar and molasses were being produced each year.

Before any hotels were built in Hilo, they often welcomed visitors into their home. Chester Lyman, a distant cousin who was a professor from England, visited in 1846.

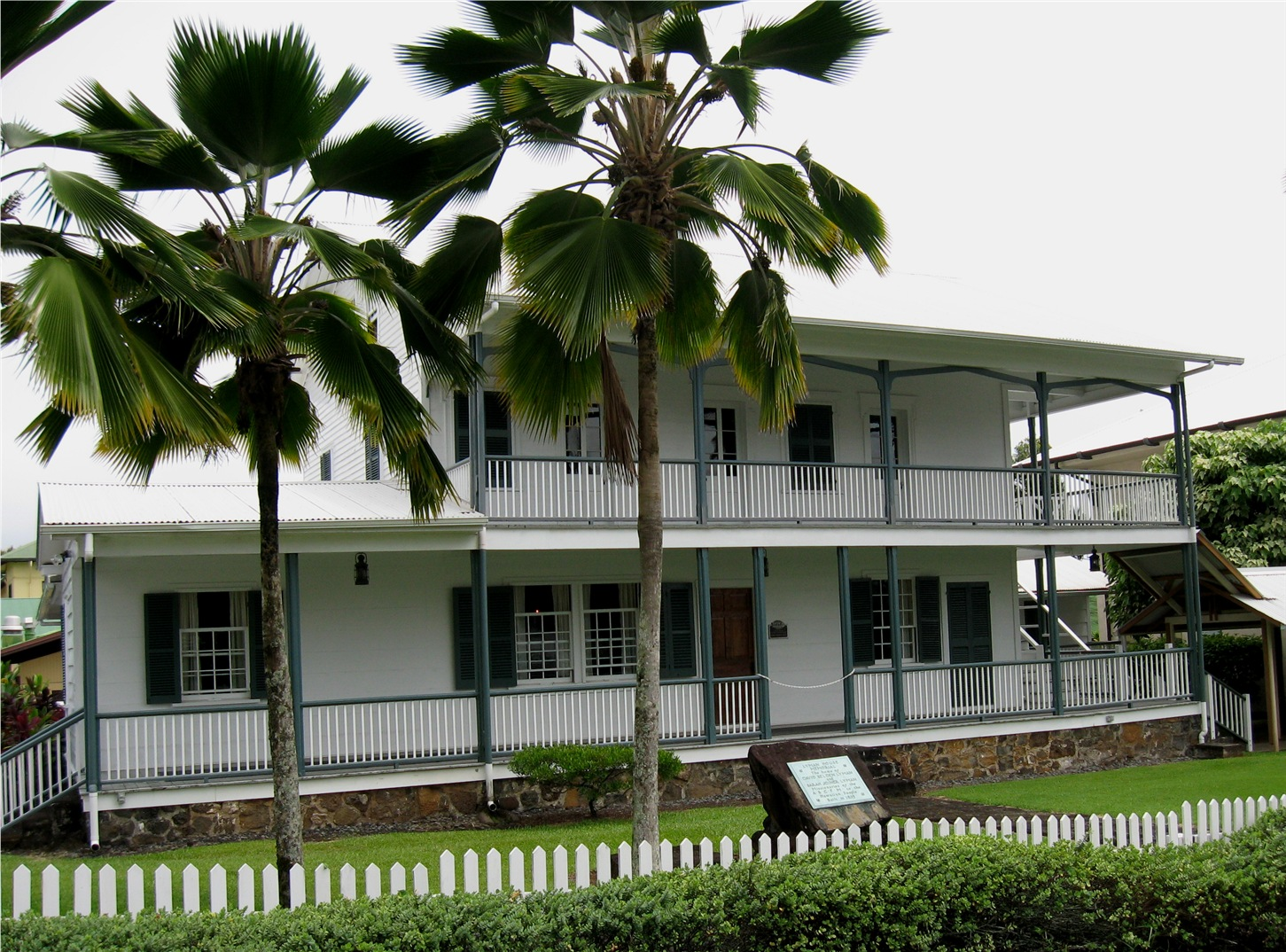
The 1839 Lyman house is now a museum

In 1846, King Kamehameha III granted the school water rights to the Wailuku River. In 1848 the school was officially incorporated, and the Great Mahele formally acknowledged property of 40 acres (16 ha). Dr. Charles Wetmore became the first doctor in Hilo and taught some classes at the school, moving into the former house of the Lymans. By 1849 the Lahaina seminary became a government public school (as it is today), and the Hilo school shifted its emphasis to educating teachers and other vocations. The Lymans enforced strict discipline, dismissing students at a high rate because of the large demand to be admitted. However, the native population kept declining due to epidemics and emigration.

In 1853, despite Lyman's protest, instruction in the English language was added to that in the Hawaiian language. On November 2, 1853, the school and church were destroyed by a fire. There were no deaths and only one serious injury; arson was suspected. Local businessmen such as Pitman raised funds to rebuild, aided by an appropriation of the Legislature of the Hawaiian Kingdom. An entire ship-load of lumber from the west coast of North America was purchased. It went into building a new wood-framed church, new boarding school buildings, and a new wing and second floor on the house to accommodate the growing family. The third and final school campus opened in 1856 about 0.5 miles (0.80 km) inland from the church and Lyman house.

Lyman retired as head of the school in 1873. Native Hawaiian Reverend J. Makaimoko Naeole next became Principal for about five years. William Brewster Oleson (1851–1915) was principal from 1878 to 1886, when he was called upon to organize the Kamehameha Schools as a similar boarding school, using the resources of the vast Bernice Pauahi Bishop estate. Author Isabella Bird stayed with the Lymans and Coans during her stay in Hilo during the 1870s, and published a book about her experiences.

== Legacy ==
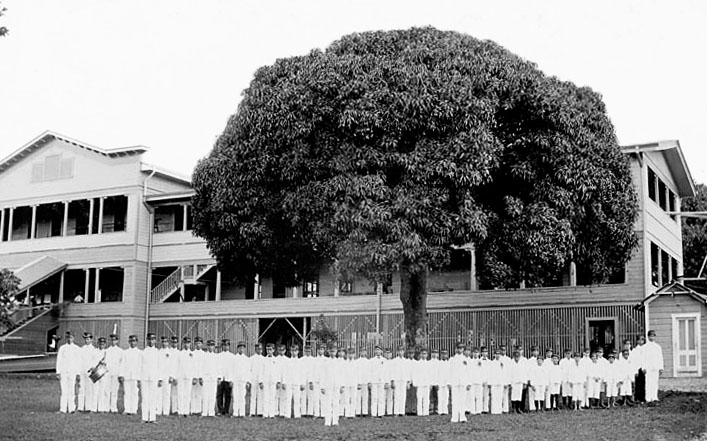
Students at the 1856 school circa 1909

The school became the first building with electricity in Hilo when a dynamo was installed on the river in 1892. They would later sell the power to the new company formed by the Lymans' son. Similar "manual training" schools would become popular on the mainland many years after the Hilo school. Samuel C. Armstrong (1839–1893), Hawaii-born son of Richard Armstrong, the Minister of Education in Hawaii during the Lyman period, founded what is now Hampton University in Virginia in 1867 based on this model.

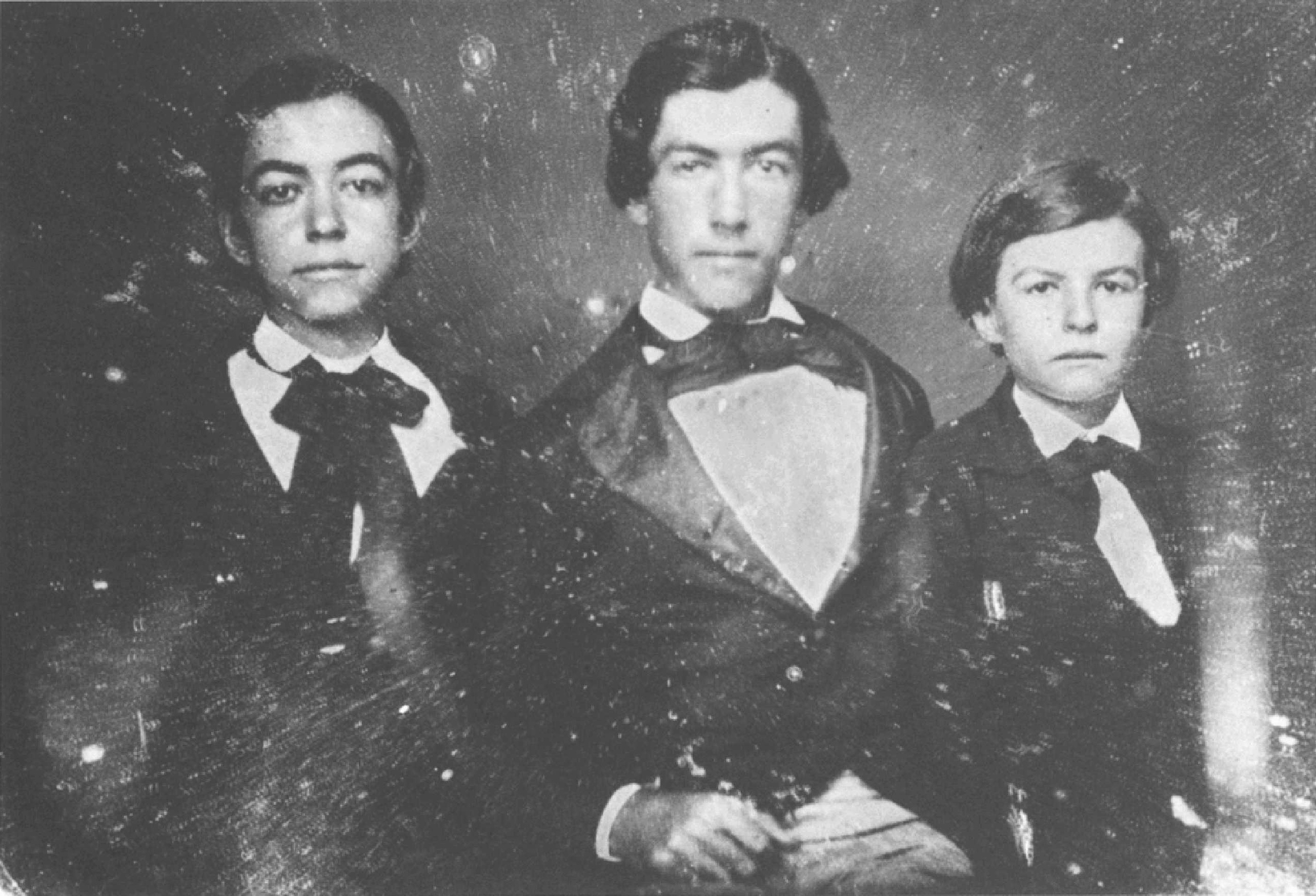
Daniel Belden Lyman's sons: Frederick, Henry and David

Henry Munson Lyman graduated from Williams College in 1858 and became a physician in the American Civil War, then married Sarah K. Clark and moved to Chicago. In 1870 he joined the faculty of Rush Medical College, and published medical books and articles. He died in Evanston, Illinois November 21, 1904. He wrote a book on his childhood in Hawaii.

Frederick Swartz Lyman, born July 25, 1837, married Isabella Chamberlain, daughter of Levi Chamberlain, another missionary, on February 16, 1861, and had 6 children. He died in Hilo on April 14, 1918.

Frederick's son Levi C. Lyman served 25 years as principal of the Hilo Boarding School, from 1897 to 1922. After a fire in 1927 destroyed the original 1856 building, Levi Lyman phased out church control of the school in favor of public schools of the Territory of Hawaii. During World War II the dormitories were used by the military, and were finally torn down in the 1960s.

David Brainerd Lyman was born March 27, 1840, and named for missionary David Brainerd. He moved to the U.S. and served in the Civil War, graduated from Yale in 1864 and Harvard law school in 1866. He married Mary Cossitt in 1870 and became a lawyer in Chicago where he helped develop the village of La Grange, Illinois, serving as the first village attorney. He named a street "Waiola Avenue" which means "Water of Life" in the Hawaiian language. He returned to visit in 1910, and died April 8, 1914, in Chicago.

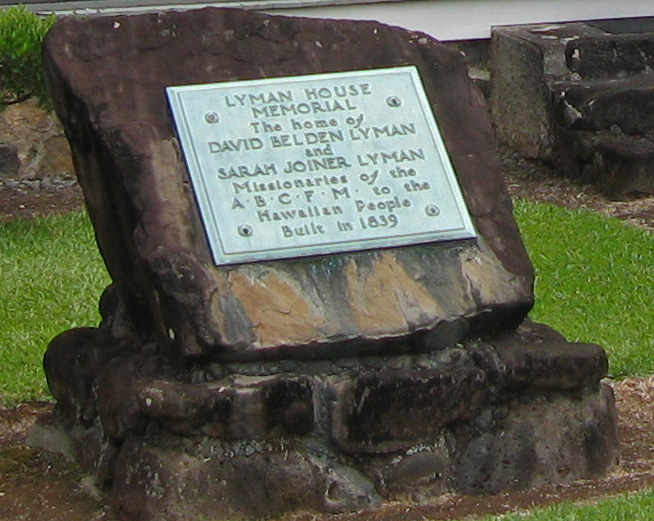
Memorial plaque at the house

Rufus Anderson Lyman born on June 23, 1842, was probably named after Rufus Anderson who was foreign secretary of the mission board and visited the mission in 1863, married Chinese-Hawaiian Rebecca Brickwood, became a local politician and judge, and had fifteen children. He died July 5, 1910.

Francis Ogden Lyman was born August 6, 1847. He moved to the U.S. in 1866, graduated from Harvard in 1871 and married Ruth Charlotte Dana (daughter of Richard Henry Dana Jr.) in 1876. He became a lawyer in Chicago with his brother David, and died December 16, 1915.

Emma Washburn Lyman, born September 16, 1849, married Samuel Whitney Wilcox (1847–1929), son of missionary Abner Wilcox (1808–1869) on October 7, 1874. He was a politician and businessman on the island of Kauaʻi. She died July 28, 1934.

The original Lyman house was listed on the National Register of Historic Places on March 24, 1978. The restored house and a modern addition was opened to the public as part of the Lyman House Memorial Museum in 1931.

=== Family tree ===
Wilcox-Lyman family tree

Abner Wilcox (1808–1869)	Lucy Eliza Hart (1814–1869)	David Belden Lyman (1803–1868)	Sarah Joiner (1805–1885)	William Harrison Rice (1813–1862)
George Norton Wilcox (1839–1933)	Albert Spencer Wilcox (1844–1919)	Frederick S. Lyman (1837–1918)	Rufus Anderson Lyman (1842–1910)	William Hyde Rice (1846–1924)
Samuel Whitney Wilcox (1847–1929)	Emma Lyman (1849–1934)
Gaylord Parke Wilcox (1881–1970)	Ralph Lyman Wilcox (1876–1913)	Anna Charlotte Rice (born 1882)
