= Rufus Anderson Lyman =

American politician

- Born: June 23, 1842; Hilo, Kingdom of Hawaii
- Died: July 4, 1910 (aged 68); Hilo
- Occupations: Judge and Politician
- Spouse: Rebecca Brickwood (born Hualani Ahung)
- Children: 15
- Parent(s): David Belden Lyman; Sarah Joiner

Rufus Anderson Lyman (June 23, 1842 – July 4, 1910) was a son of a missionary who became a lawyer and politician in the Kingdom of Hawaii, founded the Paʻauhau Sugar Plantation Company, and had many notable descendants.

== Life ==
He was born on June 23, 1842, at Hilo and died July 4, 1910, at Hilo. His mother was Sarah Joiner (1805–1885) and father was David Belden Lyman (1803–1883), missionaries in the fifth company from the American Board of Commissioners for Foreign Missions. He was the namesake of Rev Rufus Anderson who was foreign secretary of the mission board and visited his parents' mission in 1863. He attended Punahou School from 1856 to 1862 (as would ten of his children).

Rufus Lyman married Rebecca Hualani Ahung (1844–1906), the only child of Chinese merchant Chun Ahung, a co-founder of Honolulu's Hungtai Co., by his wife Luika, "Louisa." Her mother—the daughter of Kamoku and her husband Nahili or Kaniliaulaninui, who was the descendant of Kualii, a chief of O'ahu—was adopted by John Neddles Gilman who gave her the nickname "Chu Chu." After Ahung's death in 1845, Louisa "Chu Chu" became the second wife of Hawaii's Postmaster General, Arthur Peter Brickwood.

As Rebecca Ahung, Lyman's future wife attended the Royal School at Honolulu, and by June 1859 was an instructor there, teaching arithmetic and geography. Her Hawaiian name comes from hua lani which means "offspring from heaven" in the Hawaiian language.

Lyman and Rebecca had fifteen children, many of whom would become influential in different ways.

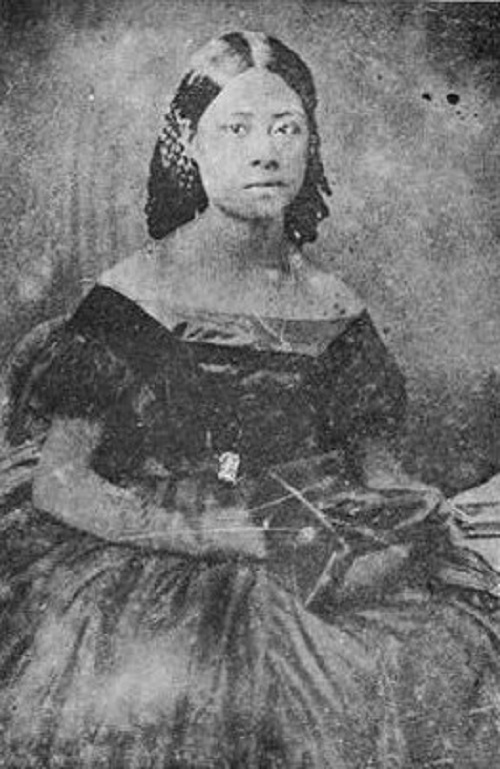
Lyman's wife Rebecca Hualani Ahung was half Chinese and half Hawaiian.

Inheriting his mother's interest in observing nearby volcanoes, Lyman developed a theory for the formation of lava tree molds discovered on the ranch of fellow missionary son William Herbert Shipman (who also married the daughter of Hawaiian nobility). This area is now Lava Tree State Monument. Rufus Anderson became circuit judge in 1866, lieutenant governor of the island in 1868, and served on several other boards and commissions. While working with the Royal Governor Princess Ruth Keʻelikōlani, he became her business advisor, helping her build one of the largest land holdings in the islands. He became tax assessor and collected both taxes and rents on the crown lands. He became friends with King Kamehameha V and wrote a short biography of the king.

== Planter ==
In 1878 the family moved to the Hāmākua district and opened the sugarcane plantation in Paʻauhau. His business partners were Samuel Parker, William G. Irwin, and Claus Spreckels. It was headquartered at coordinates 20°5′9″N 155°26′6″W, on a cliff about 300 feet (100m) above the ocean. Fields reached up the slopes of Mauna Kea, with an innovative transportation system. It became one of the first fully irrigated plantations in 1911. A small town for worker housing grew up above the mill. He opened the first post office in Hāmākua and served as its postmaster. The company was sold to Honokaʻa Sugar Company in 1972, and it shut down in 1994.

He was called to testify on conditions in Hawaii when a committee of the United States Senate visited Hawaiʻi island after the annexation. He was in favor of building a breakwater on Hilo Bay. He made clear he was not involved in the overthrow of the Kingdom of Hawaii. He favored a protectorate over annexation, but annexation over the Republic of Hawaii. He thought Queen Liliuokalani was entitled to the Crown Lands and their revenues during her life. He favored encouraging settlers to live on their own land, instead of the system that encouraged speculation.

== Children ==
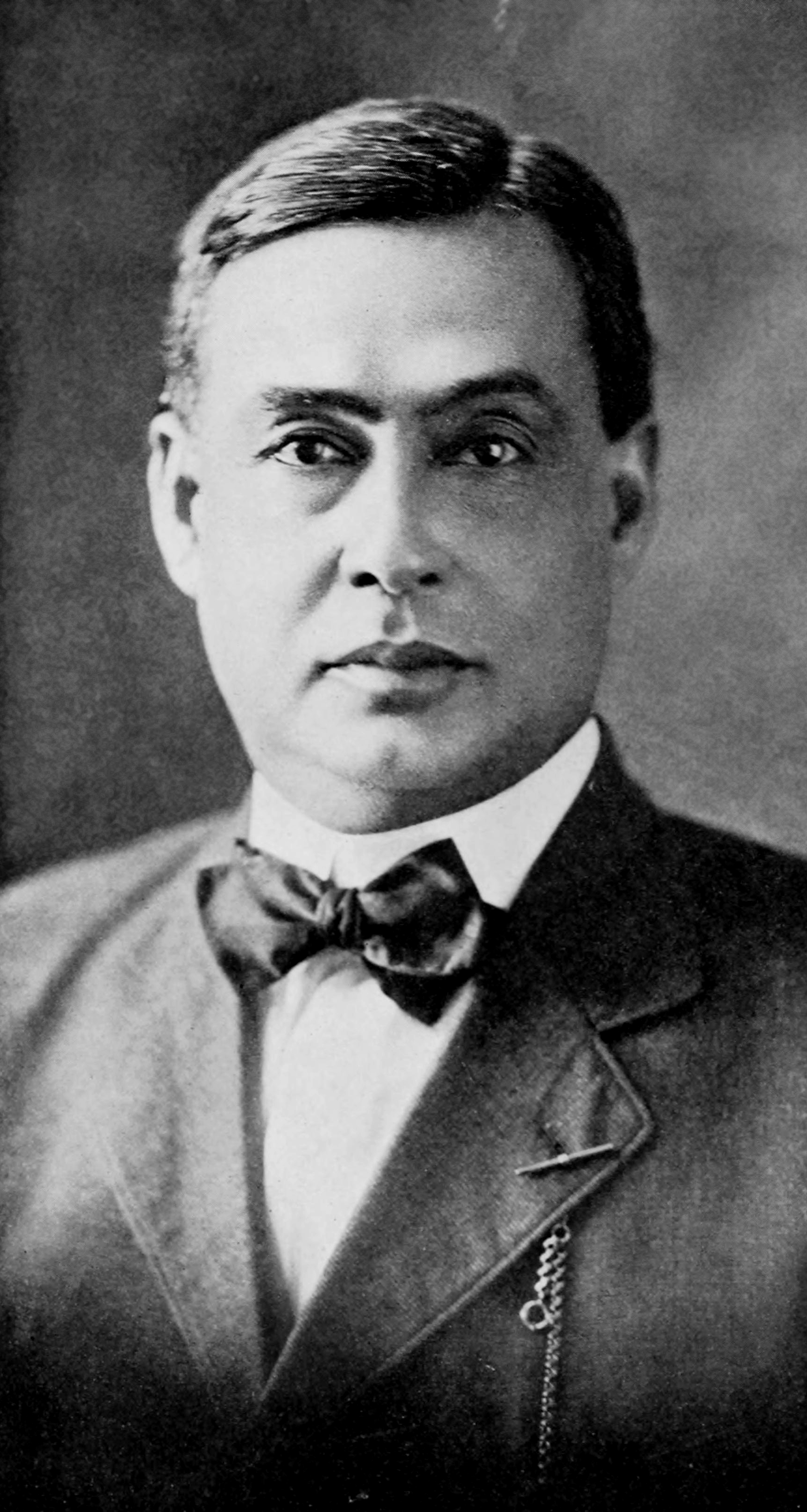
Henry Joiner Lyman

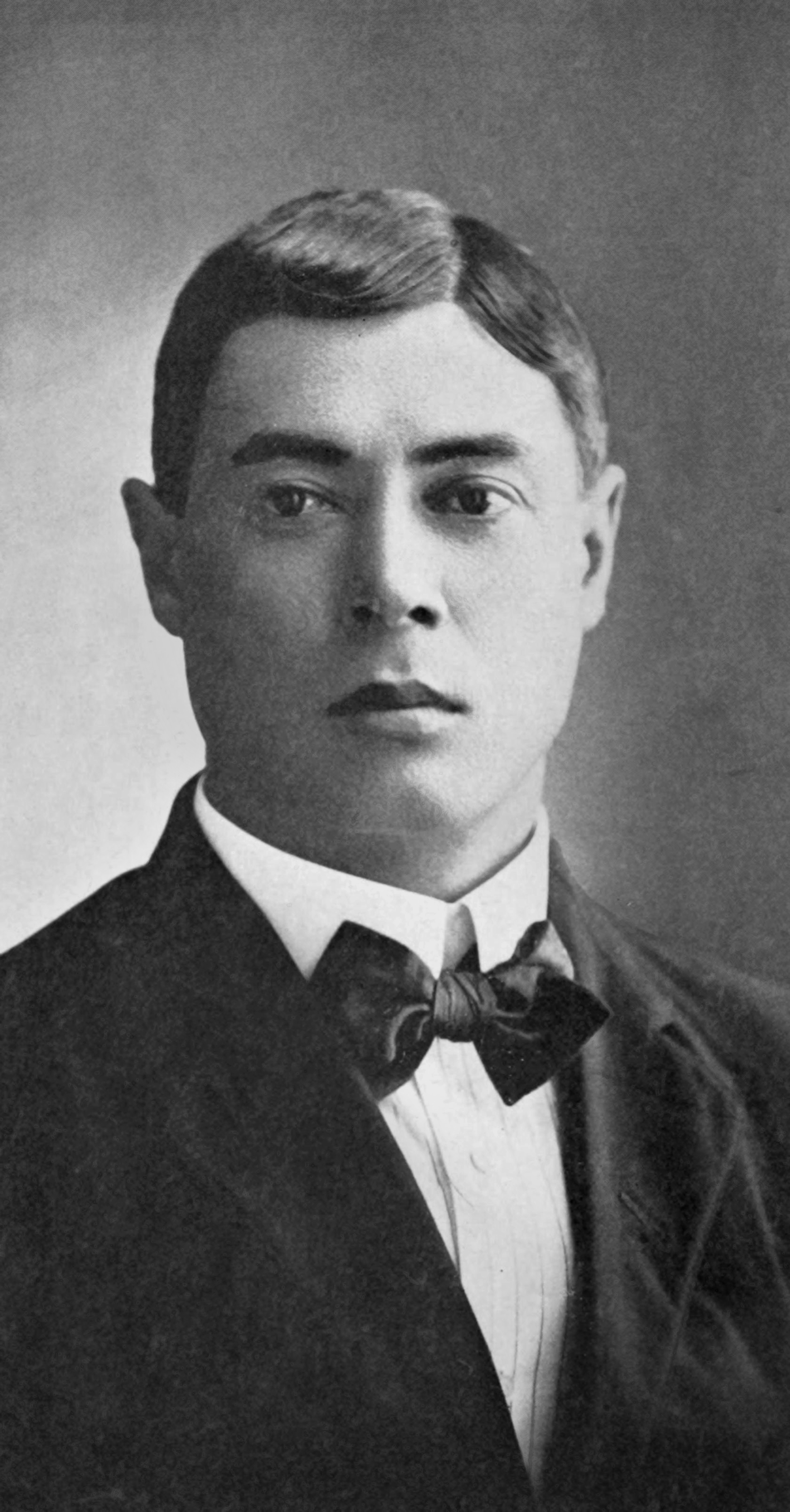
Norman K. Lyman

Daughter Lilian Louisa Hanakahi Lyman, was born November 2, 1866, and died June 5, 1894. Son Rufus Anderson Jr. (or Rufus Anderson Mahaiula) Lyman, was born January 14, 1868, and died August 20, 1933. Arthur Brickwood Keonelehua Lyman was born June 12, 1869, and died August 5, 1871.

Son Henry Joiner Kaleiokalani Lyman was born December 18, 1870. He became county supervisor for the Puna district in 1912 and elected to the territorial House of Representatives from 1919 to 1921. He died on October 29, 1932.

Son Richard Jewell Kahekili Lyman was born August 13, 1872, married Phoebe Hoakalie Williams in 1902, and died on December 10, 1954. Richard Jewell Hailihiwaokalani also known as Richard J. Lyman Jr. (1903–1988) was a member of the 1950 Constitutional Convention, and first State Senate 1959–1962. Richard J. Jr was appointed to a lifetime term as trustee of the Kamehameha Schools in 1959. Richard J. Lyman Jr. was named a Living Treasures of Hawai'i in 1982, and an award at the Kamehameha Schools Song Contest, ʻŌlelo Makuahine was named for him in 1989.

Son Norman Kalanilehua Lyman was born March 28, 1875. He married Emmeline Brown, was elected to the territorial House of Representatives from 1913 to 1927. He died on July 22, 1936.

Son Eugene Hollis Kekahuna Lyman was born on January 5, 1876, and died on March 22, 1931.

Son David Belden Kuaʻana Lyman was born on December 13, 1876, and died on April 4, 1953, in Honolulu.

Muriel Constance Kaniu Hualani Lyman born October 25, 1878, in Paʻauhau and died April 9, 1883. Sarah Irene Beatrice Laamaikahiki was born on April 30, 1880, and died in 1966.

Clarence Kumukoa Lyman was born February 28, 1882, was the first Hawaiian admitted to U.S. Military Academy at West Point. He died May 16, 1915, from an injury during a polo match.

Rebekkah Agnes Lyman was born October 21, 1883, and died soon after on October 31, 1883.

Son Albert Kualiʻi Brickwood Lyman was born May 5, 1885, graduated from West Point in 1909, and served as an officer of the U.S. Army the rest of his life. Over 35 years, he was posted in Panama, France, Cuba and Philippines. In May 1940 as colonel he was assigned to Schofield Barracks, commanding the 34th Engineer Combat Regiment of the 804th Engineer Aviation Battalion and 3rd Engineer Combat Battalion of the 25th Infantry Division. After the attack on Pearl Harbor, the 804th Engineers worked to salvage Wheeler Army Airfield, and the 3rd Engineers worked on defenses for the expected invasion. Albert was promoted to brigadier general only a few days before his death August 13, 1942, and had the Hilo International Airport named after him (later the name was applied to a new terminal building).

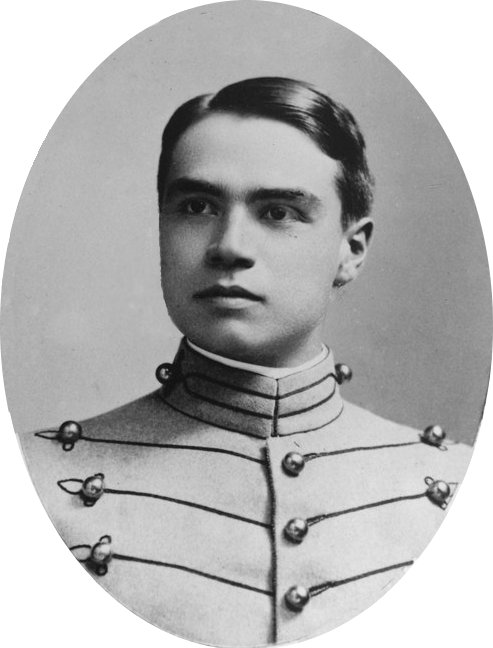

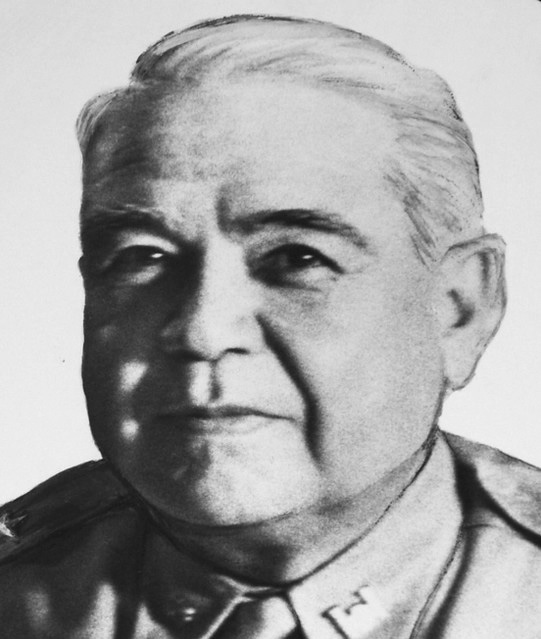

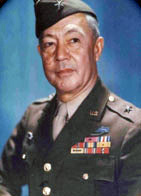

West Point graduates Clarence, Albert, and Charles Lyman

Son Charles Reed Bishop Lyman, born August 20, 1888, graduated from West Point in 1913 where he played on the football team. He was namesake of Charles Reed Bishop who founded a system of boarding schools based on the one founded by Rufus Lyman's parents, using an endowment that included the property of Princess Ruth Keʻelikōlani. He married Polly Richmond (1907–2004). In July 1942, after Japan attacked Pearl Harbor, Charles, a full colonel, was appointed military governor of the islands of Maui, Lānaʻi and Molokaʻi. Charles was promoted to brigadier general in 1944 and commanded a brigade of the 32nd Infantry Division. In June 1945 he deployed in the Battle of Leyte and Battle of Luzon in the Philippines. He participated in the signing of the peace treaty at Baguio. He retired to West Chester, Pennsylvania, and died April 15, 1981. He was buried in Arlington National Cemetery. His grandson continued operating his horse ranch called "Maui Meadow Farm".

Lewis Thorton Lyman was born September 20, 1891, and died October 13, 1948.

Albert and Charles were the first Hawaiians (and perhaps mixed-race Asian Americans) to become generals in the U.S. Army.
