= November 2000 Hawaii floods =

Natural disaster

- Satellite loop of rainfall spreading across Hawaii

Meteorological history
- Duration: October 28–November 3, 2000

Flood
- Max. rainfall: 38.97 inches (990 mm)

Overall effects
- Fatalities: None
- Damage: $88.2 million (2000 USD)
- Areas affected: Hawaii

In early November 2000, damaging flash floods struck the island of Hawaiʻi, which temporarily cut off neighborhoods in Hilo. The floods were triggered by intense thunderstorms that began affecting the state on October 28. The weather event was caused by the interaction of an upper-level trough and the remnants of Tropical Storm Paul, a short-lived tropical cyclone in the eastern Pacific Ocean. The contrasting weather forces produced strong thunderstorms along the mountainous slopes of Hawaiʻi, beginning on October 28 and lasting until November 3. The highest amount of precipitation was 38.97 in (990 mm) at Kapapala Ranch near Pāhala. This included 37.02 in (940 mm) measured over 24 hours from November 1–2, which was the highest 24-hour rainfall total on record for the island.

Damage on the island of Hawaiʻi totaled $88.2 million, mostly related to infrastructure damage. The floods produced landslides and damaged seven bridges, including the only direct connection between Hilo and Pāhala. Workers constructed a temporary bypass within a week of the floods, and a replacement bridge to Pāhala was opened in June 2001. Across Hawaiʻi, the floods destroyed four mobile homes and 29 single-family units, while 77 businesses were damaged. Governor Ben Cayetano declared a state of emergency, and President Bill Clinton designated the island as a federal disaster area. The National Guard helped evacuate residents and survey damage, while also rescuing 15 tourists at Wood Valley Temple. Flooding also affected the island of Maui, closing parts of the Hāna Highway, and leading to several rescues. On Molokaʻi, ten homes were damaged, and one person required rescue. A landslide occurred on Oʻahu along the Kalanianaʻole Highway.

== Meteorological history ==
On October 22, 2000, the Intertropical Convergence Zone produced an area of convection off the southwest coast of Mexico in the eastern Pacific Ocean. Moving to the west, it organized into Tropical Depression Eighteen-E on October 25. Despite the presence of wind shear, the depression strengthened into a tropical storm on October 26, named Paul by the National Hurricane Center (NHC). Soon after, Paul attained peak winds of 45 mph (75 km/h), although it weakened soon after with only intermittent convection. On October 28, Paul weakened to a tropical depression. That day, heavy rainfall began affecting the island of Hawaiʻi. Although Paul's circulation dissipated on October 29, moisture from the storm interacted with an upper-level trough about 500 mi (800 km) southwest of Kauai. The interaction of the warm tropical air with cooler air aloft, in addition to the direction of the tradewinds and the mountainous terrain, created favorable conditions for thunderstorm development.

From October 28–29, strong thunderstorms affected eastern Maui, producing heavy rainfall estimated over 24 in (610 mm). The heaviest rainfall occurred from November 1–2 on the island of Hawaiʻi. At Kapapala Ranch near Pāhala, a rain gage recorded 38.97 in (990 mm) of rainfall, the highest amount in association with the event. The station also recorded 22.25 in (565 mm) over six hours, and 37.02 in (940 mm) over 24 hours from November 1–2. The latter observation was the highest 24-hour rainfall total on record for the island. It was also within 1 in (25 mm) of the then-highest 24-hour rainfall total in the state of Hawaii, set on January 25, 1956. Several areas across the island of Hawaiʻi recorded 1 in 100 year precipitation events. Other significant rainfall totals included 32.47 in (825 mm) recorded in Mountain View, of which 29.75 in (756 mm) fell in 24 hours. Hilo International Airport recorded 4.56 in (116 mm) in one hour, and 26.89 in (683 mm) over 24 hours. The Hilo daily rainfall total broke the record set in February 1979 by more than 4 in (100 mm). Additionally, 16.2 in (410 mm) was recorded on November 2, which set the new calendar day total for the month of November, surpassing the previous total of 15.4 in (390 mm) on November 18, 1990. The rains led to flash flooding that collected in streams and carved out new flood channels. The floods also generated several landslides, some of which affected the Hawaii Belt Highway. Along the Wailuku River near Hilo, a gauge recorded a peak flow of 75,000 ft^{3} per second (2,123 m^{3} per second). Four gauges recorded record flows, including the Alenaio Stream, which produced floodwaters 10 ft (3.0 m) deep. The rainfall continued until November 3.

== Impact ==
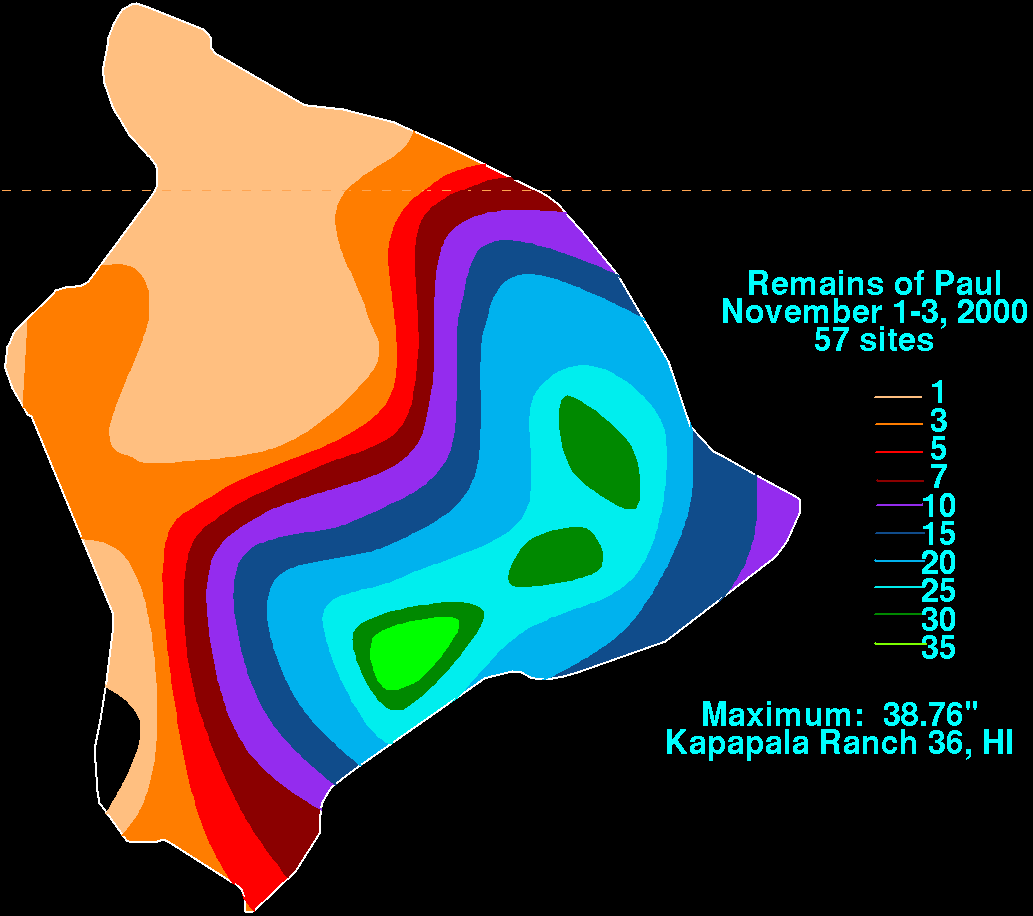
Rainfall totals on the island of Hawaii

On Maui, the thunderstorms produced flash flooding along the slopes of Haleakalā. Runoff flowed over bridges and parts of the Hāna Highway, causing it to close. Several drivers and tourists required rescue from police. The floods also closed or damaged several roads, including some affected by large boulders. Schools were closed on the island. The floods also impacted the island of Molokaʻi, with ten homes damaged. A man in a flooded vehicle required rescue in Puko'o. Water levels reached 13 ft (4.0 m) in Waialua. A landslide occurred on Oʻahu along the Kalanianaʻole Highway.

On the island of Hawaiʻi, the flooding left $88.2 million in damage. Most of the cost was infrastructure, with 71% of the overall damage related to roads, bridges, and drainage systems. The most affected districts were Hilo, Ka’u and Puna. Across Hawaiʻi, the floods destroyed four mobile homes and 29 single-family units, affecting a total of 298 residences. Dozens of families evacuated their homes, and several people required rescue, some by helicopter. The floods damaged or destroyed four bridges along the Mamalahoa Highway, the only direct connection between Hilo and Pāhala. In Hilo, the floods washed out two bridges over Waiakea Stream and one bridge over Alenaio Stream. Several Hilo neighborhoods were isolated and only accessible by boat or helicopter. Parts of the Hawaiʻi Belt Road closed, including one of the entrances to Hawaii Volcanoes National Park. There were scattered power outages across the island due to a lightning strike. Schools and government offices closed due to the floods, and public facilities were damaged. 77 businesses sustained damage. In Hilo, the Alenaio Stream uprooted trees and damaged bleachers. The stream's floods were limited due to a soccer field serving as a catch basin as well as a floodwall built by the United States Army Corps of Engineers in 1997. The 2000 flood tested the project, and was estimated to have prevented $20 million in damage.

The NWS issued flash flood warnings for Hawaiʻi, Maui, Molokaʻi, and Lānaʻi. The agency also issued flash flood watches for Oʻahu and Kauaʻi. Hawaii Governor Ben Cayetano declared a state of emergency on November 3. The governor activated the National Guard, which assisted with evacuations, debris removal, and delivering supplies. At Wood Valley Temple, the National Guard rescued stranded 15 tourists using two trucks.

== Aftermath ==
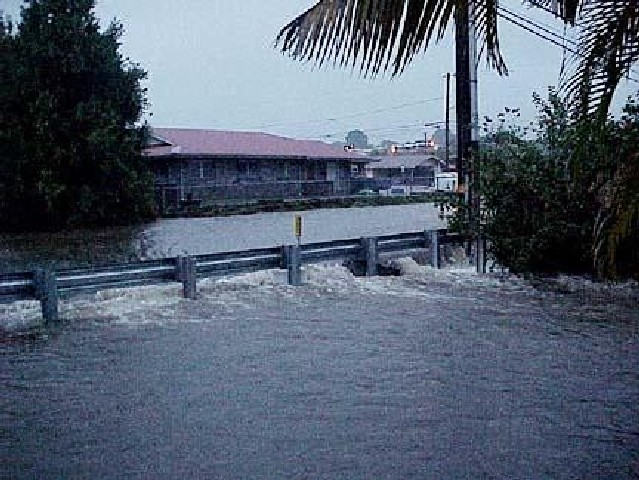
Flooding along the Alenaio Stream in Hilo

The American Red Cross provided shelter, food, and clothes, helping 210 families. The Hawaii State Civil Defense set up a Disaster Recovery Branch to help county officials manage the disaster. The Hawaii National Guard surveyed areas for damage, and helped deliver ballots for the upcoming presidential election to residents in Pahala. Crews cleared debris from roads and drainage ditches. Within a week of the floods, construction crews built a temporary 11.5 mi (18.5 km) gravel road to bypass the damaged Mamalahoa Highway. In June 2001, a new $6.3 million bridge was opened to connect Pahala. The county government of the Big Island spent $8.7 million (2000 USD) in repairs, primarily to bridges and flood controls.

On November 9, then-President Bill Clinton declared the island of Hawaii as a disaster area, allowing residents to request for assistance. The Federal Emergency Management Agency (FEMA) and Hawaii State Civil Defense opened disaster recovery centers in Hilo and Pahala to provide the affected people with information about disaster assistance programs. More than $4.1 million was spent in public assistance. This included $1.4 million for temporary housing and $2.3 million in direct grants. The Small Business Administration provided $5 million loans to small businesses and another $2.5 million to farmers. The federal government spent $4.8 million to rebuild a bridge in Hilo. Overall, federal disaster assistance totaled $88 million for Hawaii.

Following the floods and additional flood damage in 2008, the Army Corps of Engineers repaired the Alenaio Stream channel and nearby levees.

== See also ==
- 2018 Hawaii floods – damaging floods related to the greatest 24-hour rainfall total in the United States
- Hurricane Lane (2018) – the wettest tropical cyclone on record in Hawaii
- 2026 Hawaii floods – damaging floods from a series of storms
