= Waipa =

Waipa or Waipā may refer to:

== New Zealand ==
- Waipa (electorate), a former electorate
- Waipā District, a territorial local authority
- Waipā River, a waterway

== Elsewhere ==
- World Association of Investment Promotion Agencies, using the acronym WAIPA
- Waipa Foundation, non-profit organisation in Hawaii
