= March 2021 Hawaii floods =

Floods in Hawaii in March 2021

- Date: March 7 – 15, 2021
- Location: All of Hawaii
- Deaths: Unknown number killed, 1 missing
- Property damage: $49 million

The March 2021 Hawaii floods was a devastating series of floods that caused a tremendous amount of damage to the U.S state of Hawaii. The heavy rain started on March 7, 2021, and flooded the Kaupakalua Dam. It was reported that the dam flooded due to deficiencies, and as a result, it was decommissioned in 2022. One person is currently missing from the floods, and at least a half dozen homes were heavily damaged or destroyed in the flooding, which also destroyed Peahi Bridge and heavily damaged Kaupakalua Bridge. More than 1,300 customers in Haiku were without power at 6:30 a.m. Tuesday HST.

== Causes of the Flood ==
A strong low-pressure system fed by abundant moisture from the tropics fueled slow-moving storms that dropped inches of rain per hour in certain areas. Extremely heavy rains came down on Hawaii starting March 7, and overflowed the Kaupakalua Dam. More than 7.5 inches of rain fell in Haiku in the 24 hours ending at 8:45 a.m. March 10, according to the National Weather Service. More than 16 inches of rain fell near Keanae about 7 miles away in western Maui. The floodwaters from the overflowing dam and the heavy rain caused other rivers and streams to overflow, adding to the problem.

== Impact ==
Due to the scale of the floods, the Governor of Hawaii, David Ige, declared a state of emergency and ordered evacuations all over the state. Flash Flood Warnings, watches, and advisories were also issued by the National Weather Service (NWS). At least a half dozen homes were heavily damaged or destroyed in the flooding, which also destroyed Peahi Bridge, Hanalei Bridge, and heavily damaged Kaupakalua Bridge, and 1 person, carried away by floodwaters, is missing. Overtopping of the dam has now stopped, but the water level remains about 3 feet below the top of the dam. All Maui island parks were closed because of flooding and heavy rains. The Hana highway was also temporarily closed as it was overwhelmed by floodwaters. Nearly 4000 residents of the Haleiwa town were asked to evacuate. The Waiahole Stream, located above the Kamehameha Highway, reported flow rates of nearly 9,000 cubic feet per second. The previous record, obtained through 19 years of maintaining data, was set in 2012 and was 432 cubic feet per second. The typical flow is around 90 cubic feet per second — just 1 percent of what was observed on March 9. 8,200 gallons of partially treated wastewater had spilled within the grounds of a local wastewater treatment plant and partly on the grounds of the James Campbell National Wildlife Refuge. Honolulu firefighters on Tuesday rescued a 27-year-old man after his truck was swept down a stream. He was found standing on the truck's roof. On Wednesday, they suspended another search for an individual a witness saw in a stream in Pearl City. A major landslide occurred on March 11 near the Hanalei Hill, closing both lanes leading up to Hanalei Bridge. A lightning storm left over 20,000 people without power in Kahala, Kapahulu, Palolo, Waikiki, Manoa, and Moiliili, but the power was restored a few hours later. Due to more heavy rain, the Kalihi stream began rising. In response to the rising floodwaters, Kamehameha Highway was closed in both directions near Kualoa Regional Park. Kamehameha Highway at the Waikane Bridge was also temporarily closed in both directions due to flooding, but was reopened an hour later. Kuhio Highway was scheduled to be closed until March 15 due to a major landslide. Kuhio Highway was the only road leading to the north shore. There was a scheduled outage on Saturday, March 13, so that crews can complete repair work related to an outage that happened on Thursday, March 11. In addition to the scheduled outage, the Department of Water (DOW) has issued a water conservation request for Hanalei customers on Saturday, March 13.

== Aftermath ==
Following the heavy rains and floods on Oahu, the Salvation Army scheduled outreach events in Haleiwa and Hauula to help impacted residents. Eligible residents received disaster financial assistance, temporary housing assistance for those displaced by flooding, food, water and emotional and spiritual care.

== See also ==
- November 2000 Hawaii floods
- 2018 Hawaii floods
