= 2018 Hawaii floods =

Record-breaking rainfall on the Hawaiian Islands of Kauaʻi and Oahu

- Radar loop of mesoscale convective system striking Oʻahu on April 13
- Date: April 13–15, 2018
- Location: Kauaʻi, Oʻahu (Hawaii)
- Deaths: None reported
- Property damage: $125 million (2018 USD) (Note: All damage totals are in 2018 United States dollars.)

In April 2018, a series of thunderstorms produced record-breaking rainfall on the Hawaiian Islands of Kauaʻi and Oʻahu. An upper-level low moved across the area on April 13, generating a mesoscale convective system that moved over eastern Oʻahu, producing localized heavy rainfall that reached 5.55 in (141 mm). The heaviest rainfall occurred on northern Kauaʻi. There, a rain gauge owned by the Waipā Foundation, just west of Hanalei, recorded 49.69 in (1,262 mm) of rainfall in the 24 hours between 12:45 p.m. on April 14 and 15. (Note: All times in this article are in local Hawaiian Standard Time.) This was the greatest 24-hour rainfall total on record in the United States, surpassing the previous record of 43 in (1,100 mm) in Alvin, Texas on July 25–26, 1979, set during Tropical Storm Claudette. Through the event, the same gauge recorded a total of 54.37 in (1,381 mm) of rain.

The heavy rainfall produced flash flooding and landslides that covered roads and washed away several vacant houses. The floods damaged or destroyed 532 houses. Public damage totaled $19.7 million and overall damage was estimated at over $125 million. Damage on Kauaʻi was the worst from a natural disaster since Hurricane Iniki in 1992. Landslides and flooding covered parts of Kuhio Highway.

== Meteorological history ==
On April 11, 2018, an upper-level low was located west of the Hawaiian island of Kauaʻi. The low moved toward Hawaii and drew deep tropical moisture from the south. The low eventually opened into a trough, which crossed over the Hawaiian islands on April 13. That day, a mesoscale convective system (MCS) developed northwest of Molokai and intensified while moving westward through the trade winds. The MCS moved over eastern Oʻahu, dissipating after moving ashore. Another upper-level low developed on April 14, fueling additional rainfall through April 16, which caused record rainfall on Kauaʻi. The first of a series of thunderstorms moved over northern Kauaʻi around midnight on April 14. After a five-hour break in rainfall, another set of thunderstorms hit northern Kauaʻi around midnight on April 15 and lasted about eight hours. The third set of thunderstorms began around 10 AM on April 15 and continued until around 7 PM.

== Impact ==
The Honolulu National Weather Service issued various flash flood watches and warnings. The trough began dropping heavy rainfall over Hawaii on April 13. Floods damaged or destroyed 532 houses. The flooding knocked down trees and power lines, eroded many bridges and roads, and washed away crops, beehives, and livestock. Overall damage was estimated at over $125 million. Damage to public buildings was estimated at $19.7 million. Despite the damage, there were no deaths or injuries.

=== Oʻahu ===
Across eastern Oʻahu, the mesoscale convective system produced rainfall rates of about 4 in (100 mm) per hour. Over a 15-minute period, a rain gauge in Niu Valley recorded 1.42 in (36 mm) of precipitation, which has a 4–10% annual return period. The same station recorded 5.52 in (140 mm) of rainfall over a two-hour period, which has a 0.5–1% annual return period. The rainfall on Oʻahu was largely limited to the eastern one-third of the island. A station at Daniel K. Inouye International Airport recorded 0.01 in (0.25 mm) of rainfall, just 14 mi (23 km) west of Niu Valley, which recorded 5.55 in (141 mm) during the same 24-hour period.

At Waimanalo Stream north of Niu Valley, the rains caused the waters to rise 3 ft (0.91 m) in 30 minutes, and 5 ft (1.5 m) in an hour. During the rain event, Wailupe Gulch reported an 8 ft (2.4 m) rise in floodwaters. Flooding entered cars and hundreds of houses on Oʻahu. The floods also caused significant runoff, leaving a layer of debris on roads. A portion of Kalanianaole Highway was covered with nearly 1 ft (300 mm) of water, closing a stretch of the highway from Aina Haina to Makapuʻu. A mudslide covered a portion of the same highway near Kailua. Downed trees closed one block of Maunaloa Avenue in Kaimuki.

=== Kauaʻi ===
On Kauaʻi, the rainfall event occurred at low elevations near the northern coast. This was unusual, as previous rain events on the island usually occurred over higher elevations. The heaviest rainfall was early on April 15. A rain gauge owned by the Waipā Foundation, just west of Hanalei on Kauaʻi's northern coast, recorded 49.69 in (1,262 mm) of rainfall in the 24 hours ending at 12:45 p.m. local time. The total greatly surpassed the Hawaiʻi 24-hour rainfall record of 38 in (970 mm) set on January 25, 1956, at Kīlauea. The total also broke the national 24-hour rainfall record of 43 in (1,100 mm) set during Tropical Storm Claudette on July 25–26, 1979 in Alvin, Texas, a record confirmed in December 2018. The Waipā rain gauge also recorded 1.77 in (45 mm) over 15 minutes, 5.51 in (140 mm) over an hour, 19.52 in (496 mm) over six hours, 33.33 in (847 mm) over 12 hours, and 54.37 in (1,381 mm) over 48 hours. Elsewhere on northern Kauaʻi, a rain gauge in Wainiha recorded 32.35 in (822 mm), and a gauge in Hanalei recorded 28.41 in (722 mm) before it failed. Minimal rainfall occurred on the southern and western coasts of Kauaʻi. The intense rainfall washed out several river gauges. Along the Hanalei River, the United States Geological Survey (USGS) estimated that floodwaters rose 15 ft (4.6 m), representing a peak flow rate of 32,700 cubic feet per second (ft^{3}/s, 926 m^{3}/s) before the station failed. The Wainiha River reported a record flow rate during the event.

The rain event caused the worst natural disaster in Kauaʻi since Hurricane Iniki in 1992. The sudden rains caused landslides, mostly in isolated areas, as well as flash flooding, causing power outages in Hanalei and Wainiha. Rising waters washed out four vacant homes and entered dozens of others. The rising waters forced guests at the Hanalei Colony Resort to move to the second floor. The floodwaters reached 8 ft (2.4 m) deep near Hanalei, closing parts of Kuhio Highway. Landslides occurred at 15 locations along the highway, leaving residents in Wainiha and Haena without regional road access, disrupting relief efforts. Three bridges along the route were damaged, which delayed repairs, leaving the Kuhio Highway closed as of November 2018. Residents used a 1 mi (1.6 km) detour on a dirt road. The flooding forced the temporary closure of three beaches – Kalapaki Beach, Koloa Landing, and Moloaa Bay – as well as two parks, Nā Pali Coast State Park and Haʻena State Park. Wainiha and Haena residents were urged to limit their water use due to contaminated water supply.

== Aftermath and records ==
Kauaʻi Mayor Bernard Carvalho Jr. declared a state of emergency for portions of Kauaʻi, which effectively restricted tourist operations in the Hanalei area. He extended the emergency four more times, effective through January 4, 2019. After the floods, Hawaiian Governor David Ige also declared a State of Emergency. On April 18, the Hawaii legislature approved $125 million in disaster funding, including $100 million for Kauaʻi. On May 8, President Donald Trump declared a federal disaster area for Kauaʻi and Honolulu counties. Initially, the declaration was limited to federal reimbursement for repairs to public infrastructure, but on June 27 it was expanded to include individual assistance. Ultimately, the Federal Emergency Management Agency (FEMA) approved 250 individual assistance applications, totaling about $1.5 million, with another $2.6 million in public assistance grants. FEMA opened three disaster recovery centers, which provided resources for the application process; these centers closed by July 20. On November 30, Carvalho granted $500,000 to six nonprofits for counselors, meals, emergency supplies, and rebuilding parts of the Limahuli Garden and Preserve.

Local and national emergency crews rescued people from their flooded homes by helicopter, boat, and bus, including 475 by helicopter; more than 40% of those rescued by helicopter were tourists. The Hawaii Department of Transportation ran convoys throughout the day along the damaged portions of Kuhio Highway while it was being repaired. The cost of reconstructing the highway was estimated at $100 million; much of it was covered by the federal government. In August 2018, Hurricane Lane dropped heavy rainfall in the same area, causing further flooding damage to houses and the Kuhio Highway. The Hanalei post office, damaged by the floods, reopened on July 30. A Red Cross shelter in Kilauea housed 13 people after the event. Some of the displaced stayed with family or friends. The Hanalei Colony Resort evacuated its guests on April 16 and remained closed through October. It temporarily housed National Guardsmen and families displaced by the floods. At least two dozen students used the resort as a temporary school. The resort's staff won the Excellence in Community Service Award at the 29th Annual Na Po‘e Pa‘ahana Awards, a ceremony for excellence in the hospitality industry.

On August 2, 2018, National Weather Service Senior Hydrologist Kevin Kodama inspected and calibrated record-breaking rain gauge at Waipā Garden, confirming that the instrument was functioning normally. On December 4, 2018, the National Climate Extremes Committee verified that the 49.69 in (1.262 m) accumulation was the highest 24-hour rainfall total in the U.S.

== See also ==
- List of wettest tropical cyclones in the United States
- Hurricane Lane (2018) – a hurricane that brought heavy rainfall to Hawaii in August 2018
- March 2021 Hawaii floods – Another major flood event in Hawaii
- 2026 Hawaii floods - major floods
