= Kamehameha Schools Hawaiʻi Campus =

Kamehameha Schools Hawaiʻi

Location
- 16-714 Volcano Road; Keaʻau, Hawaiʻi 96749; 19°36′33″N 155°3′10″W

Information
- Type: Private
- Motto: ʻImi na ʻauao (seek enlightenment)
- Religious affiliation: Protestant
- Established: 1996
- Principal: Kaulu Gapero
- Grades: Preschool–12
- Enrollment: 1,163
- Campus type: Outdoor
- Colors: White, light blue and dark blue
- Athletics: Swimming, Diving, Water Polo, Basketball, Tennis, Track & Field, Cross Country, Wrestling, Soccer, Baseball, Football, Cheerleading, Softball, Judo, Volleyball, Canoe Paddling, Golf, Air Riflery
- Athletics conference: Big Island Interscholastic Federation
- Accreditation: Western Association of Schools and Colleges
- Affiliation: Kamehameha Schools
- Mascot: Warrior
- Newspaper: Na ʻOiwi o Hawaiʻi
- Yearbook: Moku O Keawe
- Website: http://hawaii.ksbe.edu

The Kamehameha Schools Hawaiʻi Campus is a campus consisting of an elementary, middle and high school on the island of Hawaiʻi. The school is part of the Kamehameha Schools' private school system.

Located in Keaʻau, roughly 10 miles (16 km) from the seaside port town of Hilo, Hawaii, the Hawaiʻi island campus opened in August 2001. As of 2006, the 300-acre (1.2 km^{2}) campus served approximately 1,120 students from grades K-12. Students attend from the entire island, although those on the western side between Paʻauilo and Naʻālehu have the option of apply to the main Kapālama Campus as boarders.

The Keaʻau campus is located on land formerly owned by William Herbert Shipman, who, along with Samuel M. Damon and Captain Elders, acquired the property in 1881 after it was auctioned by the estate of King Lunalilo, a grandnephew of King Kamehameha I.

In addition to classroom buildings at the elementary and middle school division, shared buildings include a learning center, administration building, and a cafeteria/band facility. Construction of the Hawaiʻi Campus cost roughly $225 million. Like its sister campus in Pukalani on Maui, the Hawaii Campus graduated its first class in 2006. Ninia M. E. Aldrich became principal of the high school in 2002. About 100 students were in the first high school class in 2002.

== History ==
The first campus was built in the Kapālama area of Honolulu, then a Maui Campus, and finally, the Hawaiʻi Island Campus. Plans were announced in 1999 to move from a smaller temporary campus.

== Traditions ==
The Kamehameha Schools Hawaiʻi started traditions aside from those adopted from the older Kapalama Campus. Among these are:

Hoʻike: Annual student-produced performance of dancing, singing, and drama.

Elementary concerts: Concerts held in the Haʻaeamahi Dining Hall.

Junior Class Greek Day: a Greek Culture Day with games, food, music, and dance. Students are split into competing "city-states" with cheers and Greek costumes .

Freshmen Makahiki: students play Hawaiian games and learn to dance hula.

May Day: Every year on May 1, students participate in the festivities of hula. All elementary students participate in their show, and Hawaiian Ensemble puts on the show for the middle school. Normally, the middle school and the elementary school watch and support each other's shows.

Ho'olaule'a: Every year the school puts on a Hoʻolauleʻa which consists of games, foods, booths by local vendors, entertainment from the elementary choir, and a local band.

== Curriculum ==
In addition to providing a comprehensive curriculum, the school draws upon the unique resources of the island, including the University of Hawaiʻi at Hilo and Hawaiʻi Community College, as well as astronomical observatories on Mauna Kea. The forestry, geologic, marine life, and agricultural aspects of the island also play an important role in the curriculum.

Kamehameha Schools offers many extra-curricular activities and sports. The marching band appeared in the 2008 Tournament of Roses Parade.

The school offers classes in Hawaiian language in middle and high school as well as Japanese and Spanish in high school.

== Notable people ==
=== Alumni ===
- Kolten Wong, Major League Baseball player
- Pā'ele Kiakona organizer and politician who is a member-elect of the Hawaii House of Representatives for the 14th district.

=== Faculty ===
- Bob Wagner, former athletic director

== See also ==
- Kamehameha Schools Maui Campus
- Kamehameha Schools Song Contest
