= March 2026 Hawaii floods =

Natural disaster

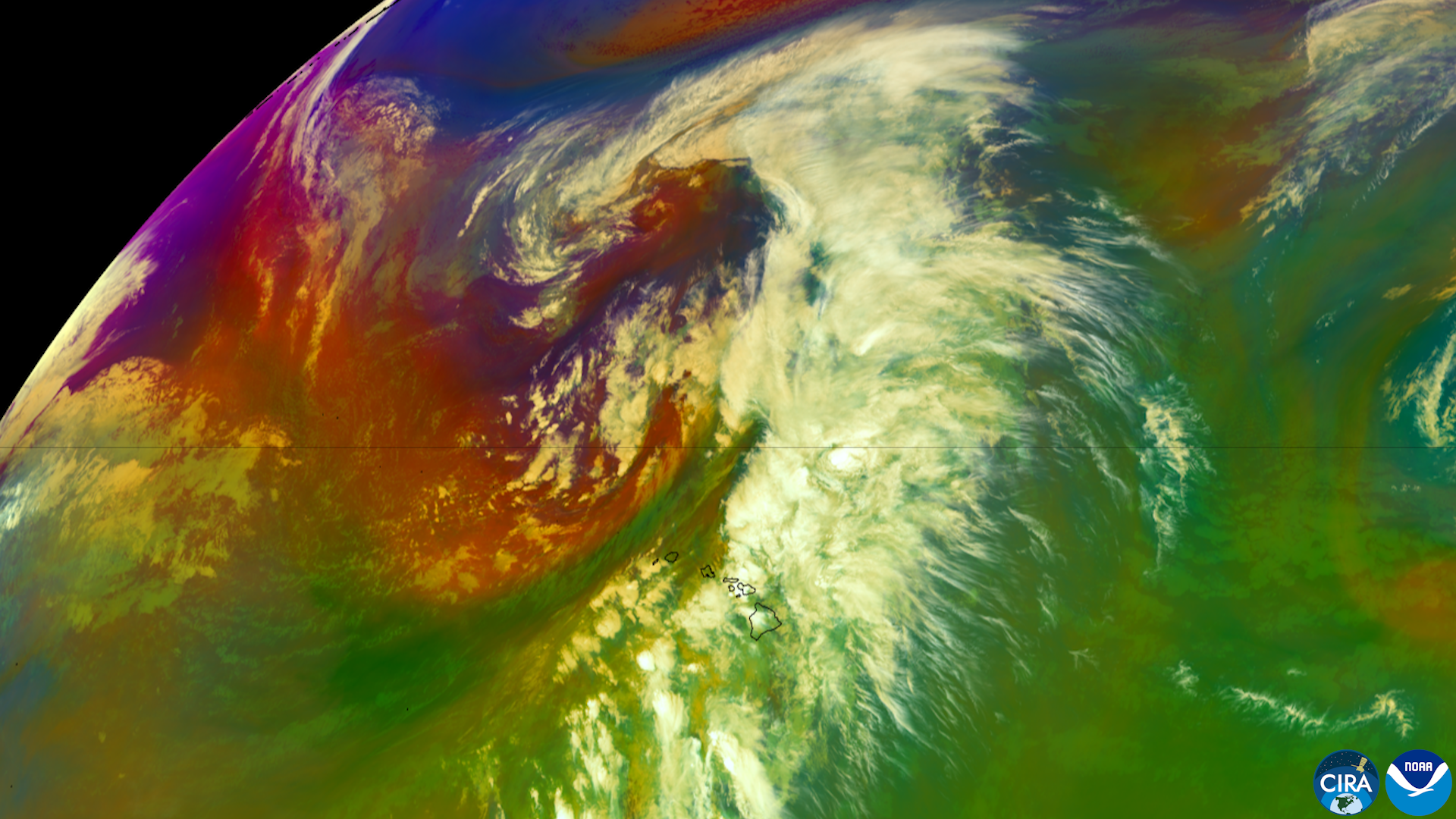
- Satellite image of the Kona Low north of Hawai’i

Meteorological history
- Duration: March 10–24, 2026

Flood
- Max. rainfall: 54.92 inches (1,395 mm)

Overall effects
- Fatalities: None
- Damage: $1 billion (2026 USD)
- Areas affected: Hawaii

In March 2026, two Kona storms affected the U.S. state of Hawaii, producing flash floods that produced more than $1 billion in damage.

== Meteorological history ==
In mid-March 2026, an upper-level trough was located northwest of Hawaii. A surface low pressure area formed within the trough, also known as a Kona storm. The storm drew tropical moisture from the south, producing thunderstorms and over Hawaii. Smaller weather disturbances developed within the overall system, the first of which moved through the western Hawaiian islands on March 10. A stronger line of storms hit the state two days later. The Kona storm lasted until March 15, with a peak precipitation of 49.57 in (1,259 mm) recorded on the summit of Maui. The system also produced strong winds across the region, with wind gusts of over 100 mph (160 km/h) recorded on the island of Hawaii.

In the wake of the trough, tropical moisture remained over the region. A compact extratropical storm formed on March 17 to the south of Midway Atoll, which began affecting Hawaii two days later. The storm passed near Kauai on March 20 before moving northward. A trough developed behind the storm on March 21, which moved slowly across the Hawaiian islands over the next few days. Rainfall from the second Kona storm peaked at 25.21 in (640 mm) on Kaʻala, Oahu. The trade winds brought dry air to the state on March 24, ending the rainfall event. The highest rainfall from both events was 54.92 inches (1,395 mm), recorded at the summit on Maui.

== Preparations and impacts ==
The first Kona storm produced daily precipitation records in several locations across Hawaii. The most significant flooding occurred on Maui and the island of Hawaii. The two islands were also flooded by the second Kona storm, along with Oahu. The floods closed roads, entered homes, and caused landslides. Statewide damage from the two events totaled $1 billion, including $400 million from the first storm.

At a hospital in Kula on Maui, the flood damage forced 112 patients to evacuate.

== Aftermath ==
On March 24, Hawaii Governor Josh Green requested a federal disaster declaration, which was approved on April 7. The Hawaii National Guard assisted with debris removal and emergency logistics. Officials set up a mobile clinic in Haleʻiwa to help residents affected by the floods. Following the storms, the Department of Health began conducting soil sampling at Patsy T. Mink Central Oahu Regional Park to determine if there was contamination in the soil.

In April, discussing the progression of statewide cleanup efforts following the storms, Brian Schatz, the senior U.S. Senator from Hawaii, thanked first responders and residents for assisting one another during the natural disaster and urged the federal government to "share the burden of rebuilding."

== See also ==
- November 2000 Hawaii floods
- 2018 Hawaii floods – damaging floods related to the greatest 24-hour rainfall total in the United States
