= Charles Kekumano =

Native Hawaiian Roman Catholic priest

Charles Alvin Kekumano
- Born: May 12, 1919; Kealakekua, Territory of Hawaii
- Died: January 19, 1998 (aged 78); Honolulu
- Resting place: Nuuanu Memorial Park
- Education: Saint Louis School
- Alma mater: Catholic University of America
- Known for: First Native Hawaiian ordained to Roman Catholic priesthood

Charles Alvin Kekumano (12 May 1919 – 19 January 1998) was a Roman Catholic priest from Hawaii. He is considered the first ordained Native Hawaiian priest.

== Life ==
Charles Kekumano was born in 1919 in Kona on the island of Hawai‘i. Educated at Saint Louis High School in Honolulu, he studied for the priesthood in Southern California and was ordained for the newly formed Diocese of Honolulu. He earned a doctorate in Canon law from The Catholic University of America in Washington, D.C., and was appointed chancellor of the Honolulu diocese, secretary to Bishop James Joseph Sweeney, and later rector of the Cathedral of Our Lady of Peace. In 1961 he was named an honorary chaplain of the Papal household, with the title of Monsignor, by Blessed John XXIII, the first native Hawaiian to hold such an honor.

Shortly after Father Joseph Anthony Ferrario became bishop, Kekumano left the diocese of Honolulu, to work in the diocese of Juneau. He retired in 1984 and returned to Honolulu. Kekumano was involved in many civic organizations, including the American Red Cross, the Duke Kahanamoku Foundation, the Association of Hawaiian Civic Clubs, the Hawaiian Civic Club of Honolulu. He also served on the University of Hawaii Board of Regents, the Honolulu Police Commission, the Maui Charter Commission, and the Hawaii Commission on Children and Youth. Kekumano was also a trustee of the Queen Liliuokalani Trust from 1986–1998. He was president of the 200 Club, Coalition for a Drug Free Hawaii and the Hawaii chapter of the United Service Organization.

In 1997 he was co-author of the essay "Broken Trust" which criticized Kamehameha Schools, the largest private landowner in Hawaii, resulting in their reorganization. He died of cancer on January 18, 1998, in St. Francis Hospice in Honolulu, at the age of 78.

== Recognition and legacy ==
Monsignor Kekumano was awarded Humanitarian of the Year in 1992 from the Hawaii State Chapter of the American Red Cross. The Maryknoll School established an award and scholarship in his honor.
