= Blane Gaison =

American football player (born 1958)

No. 34
- Position: Defensive back

Personal information
- Born: May 13, 1958 (age 68); Kaneohe, Hawaii, U.S.
- Listed height: 6 ft 1 in (1.85 m)
- Listed weight: 185 lb (84 kg)

Career information
- High school: Kamehameha Schools (Honolulu, Hawaii)
- College: Hawaii
- NFL draft: 1981: undrafted

Career history

Playing
- Atlanta Falcons (1981–1985)

Coaching
- Kamehameha–Kapalama (1989–1996) Head coach

Operations
- Kamehameha–Kapalama (1989–1996) Associate athletics director; Kamehameha–Kapalama (1996–2012) Co-athletic director; Kamehameha Schools Maui (2012–2016) Athletic director; Interscholastic League of Honolulu (2015–present) Executive director

Awards and highlights
- Hula Bowl MVP (1981)

Career NFL statistics
- Interceptions: 2
- Fumble recoveries: 3
- Touchdowns: 1
- Stats at Pro Football Reference

Blane Keith Gaison (born May 13, 1958) is an American former professional football player who was a defensive back for the Atlanta Falcons in the National Football League (NFL) from 1981 to 1985. He played college football for the Hawaii Rainbow Warriors. He played in the NFL at both the safety and cornerback positions.

== Early life ==
Gaison was raised in Kaneohe, Hawaii on the windward side of Oahu. He attended the Kamehameha Schools in Honolulu, Hawaii and is a 1976 graduate. At Kamehameha, he was an All-State quarterback leading the Warrior football team to consecutive state titles in 1974 and 1975 also known as the Oahu Prep Bowl and Interscholastic League of Honolulu championship games.

== University of Hawaii ==
Blane Gaison played college football at University of Hawaiʻi at Mānoa from 1976 to 1980, starting at quarterback and defensive back. He was the University of Hawaii's Most Valuable Player in 1979 and 1980 and was included on the University of Hawaii Centurion's list with the description, "Steering the defense from his safety position, Gaison was a coach on the field. Number 11's intelligence and versatility provided Rainbow Warriors fans with some of their greatest memories. He received All America, All Western Athletic Conference and Academic All Western Athletic Conference honors in 1979 and 1980. Gaison was also recognized with Most Valuable Player honors at the 1981 Hula Bowl along with Kenny Easley. He was inducted into the University of Hawaii's Circle of Honor in 1999.

== Professional career ==
In the 1981 NFL draft, Gaison was picked by the Atlanta Falcons where he played in the defensive secondary as a safety and cornerback. He became close friends with teammates Steve Bartkowski, Bob Glazebrook, Billy "White Shoes" Johnson, and June Jones.

== Career in education ==
Gaison's Bachelor's degree is in Pre-Law with a minor in Secondary Education. Gaison is a recipient of the National Federation of High Schools (NFHS) Citation Award as well as the National Interscholastic Athletic Administrators Association (NIAAA) Distinguished Service Award for his contribution and services to high school athletics on the state, local and national levels.

== Administrative career ==
After his retirement from professional football, Gaison was named the head football coach and associate athletics director at his alma mater Kamehameha Schools–Kapalama in 1989 and served as the football coach until 1996 when he was promoted to co-athletic director. He served in this role for 16 years before being named the sole athletic director at Kamehameha Schools' Maui campus in 2012. He was named the executive director of the Interscholastic League of Honolulu in 2015.

== Family ==
Blane Gaison is married to Donnalei, and the couple have four children: Pilialoha, Kapulani, Iokepa and Kona.
