= Kamehameha Schools =

Private school system in Hawaii

- Seal of Kamehameha Schools

Location
- 1887 Makuakāne Street; Honolulu, Hawaiʻi 96817; United States; 21°20′24″N 157°51′27″W

Information
- Type: Private, College-prep; Day & Boarding
- Motto: I Mua Kamehameha (Forward, Kamehameha)
- Religious affiliation: Nondenominational Protestant
- Established: 1887
- Founder: Bernice Pauahi Bishop
- Headmaster: Taran Chun, (Kapālama), Kāhealani Nae’ole-Wong, (Hawaiʻi), Lee Ann DeLima (Maui)
- Grades: PK–12
- Enrollment: >6,900
- Campuses: 3: Kapālama, Honolulu; Pukalani, Maui; Keaʻau, Hawaiʻi
- Campus size: 600 acres (2.4 km^{2}) (Kapālama); 180 acres (0.73 km^{2}) (Maui); 300 acres (1.2 km^{2}) (Hawaiʻi)
- Colors: Blue; White
- Song: "Sons of Hawaiʻi"
- Fight song: "I Mua Kamehameha"
- Athletics conference: Interscholastic League of Honolulu Division I
- Team name: Warriors
- Accreditation: Western Association of Schools and Colleges
- Newspaper: Ka Mōʻī
- Yearbook: Ka Naʻi Aupuni
- Endowment: $15.1 billion (2022)
- Website: www.ksbe.edu

Kamehameha Schools, formerly called Kamehameha Schools Bishop Estate (KSBE), is a private school system in Hawaiʻi established by the Bernice Pauahi Bishop Estate, under the terms of the will of Princess Bernice Pauahi Bishop, who was a formal member of the House of Kamehameha. Bishop's will established a trust called the "Bernice Pauahi Bishop Estate" that is Hawaiʻi's largest private landowner. Originally established in 1887 as an all-boys school for Hawaiian children, it shared its grounds with the Bishop Museum. The first graduating class consisted of 14 boys.

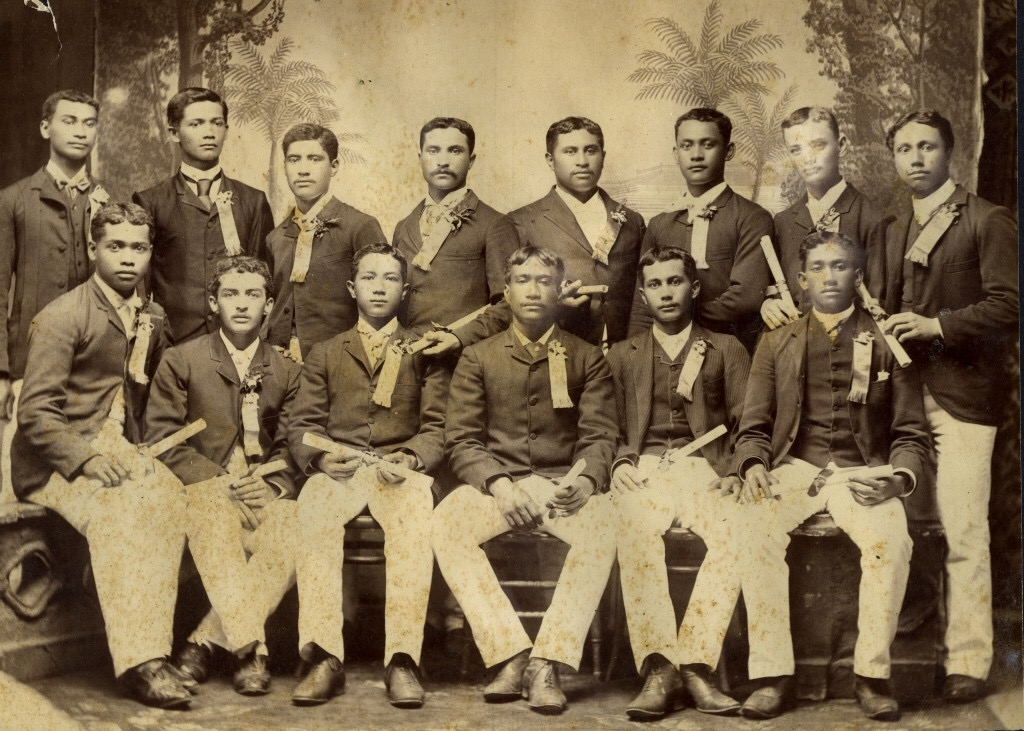
First Graduating Class of Kamehameha Schools

After it moved to another location, the museum took over two school halls. Kamehameha Schools opened the girls' school required by the will in 1894. It became coeducational in 1965. The 600-acre (2.4 km^{2}) Kapālama campus opened in 1931, while the Maui and Hawaiʻi campuses opened in 1996 and 2001, respectively.

It was developed at the bequest of Princess Bernice Pauahi Bishop to educate the children of Hawaii with a fund set aside for orphaned and indigent children of Hawaiian descent, and is designed to serve students from preschool through twelfth grade. The school teaches in the English language a college-prep education enhanced by Hawaiian culture, language and practices, imparting historical and practical value of continuing Hawaiian traditions. It operates 31 preschools statewide and three grade K–12 campuses in Kapālama, Oʻahu, Pukalani, Maui, and Keaʻau, Hawaiʻi.

As the terms of its founding leaves the admission policy to the board of Trustees, the school has adopted an admissions policy fully preferential to applicants with Native Hawaiian ancestry. Since 1965 it has excluded all but two non-Hawaiians from being admitted. A lawsuit challenging the school's admission policy resulted in a narrow victory for Kamehameha in the Ninth Circuit Court; however, Kamehameha ultimately settled, paying the plaintiff $7 million.

As of the 2011–12 school year, Kamehameha had an enrollment of 5,398 students at its three main campuses and 1,317 children at its preschools, for a total enrollment of 5,416. Beyond its campuses, Kamehameha served an estimated 46,923 Hawaiians in 2011 through its support for public schools, charter schools, and families and caregivers throughout Hawaii.

According to the Kamehameha Schools home website, the mission statement is as follows: "Kamehameha Schools' mission is to fulfill Pauahi's desire to create educational opportunities in perpetuity to improve the capability and well-being of people of Hawaiian ancestry."

== History ==
In 1883, Bernice Pauahi Bishop, a member of the Hawaiian royal family, directed in her will, after naming heirs for gifts of money and land, that the remainder of her estate be held in trust to create the Kamehameha Schools. A majority of the Bishop estate was inherited from her parent and her cousin Ruth Keʻelikōlani, who in turn had inherited a substantial amount from her first husband Leleiohoku I and her half-siblings Victoria Kamāmalu and Kamehameha V, all who were given substantial amounts of land in the Great Mahele of 1848 which had divided the land of the kingdom amongst the King, the ali'i and the common people. During her lifetime, she experienced and encountered the decline of her Hawaiian people. She was well aware that education was key to the survival of her people and culture; therefore, she left 375,000 acres of ancestral land, entrusting her trustees to use this gift to educate her people.

Bernice named Samuel Mills Damon, William Owen Smith, Charles Montague Cooke, Charles McEwen Hyde, and her husband, Charles Reed Bishop, as the original five trustees to invest her estate at their discretion, use the income to operate the schools, and also "to devote a portion of each year's income to the support and education of orphans, and others in indigent circumstances, giving the preference to Hawaiians of pure or part aboriginal blood." She also directed the Hawaiʻi (Kingdom) Supreme Court to appoint replacement trustees and required that all teachers be Protestant, without regard to denomination.

After Bishop's death in 1884, her husband Charles Reed Bishop carried out her will. Reverend William Brewster Oleson (1851–1915), former principal of the Hilo boarding school founded by David Belden Lyman in 1836, helped organize the schools on a similar model of European-American education. The original Kamehameha School for Boys opened in 1887; after it moved to a new campus, that site was later taken over by the Bishop Museum. The girls' school opened nearby in 1894. The preparatory school, originally serving grades K–6, opened in 1888 adjacent to the boys' school. By 1955, all three schools had moved to the current 600-acre (2.4 km^{2}) campus in Kapālama Heights. The schools became co-ed in 1965. In 1996, the school opened a 180-acre (0.73 km^{2}) campus on Maui, followed in 2001 by the 300-acre (1.2 km^{2}) campus on Hawaiʻi.

In 1991, the Equal Employment Opportunity Commission (EEOC) brought suit against Kamehameha Schools alleging that its requirement that all teachers be Protestant was religious discrimination in violation of the Civil Rights Act of 1964. Although Kamehameha Schools conceded the practice was discriminatory, the School maintained that it was bound by the provisions of Bernice Pauahi Bishop's will, which established the charitable trust creating the School as well as mandating that all the teachers "be persons of the Protestant religion." Accordingly, the School sought to be included within one of the applicable exemptions to the Civil Rights Act of 1964.

Then Chief Judge Alan Cooke Kay of the United States District Court for the District of Hawaii, a great-grandson of Charles Montague Cooke, ruled in Kamehameha's favor, finding that the religious education exemption, the religious curriculum exemption, and the bona fide occupational qualification exemption were each applicable to Kamehameha Schools. The United States Court of Appeals for the Ninth Circuit reversed the decision of the District Court, holding that none of the exemptions to the Civil Rights Act was applicable since the School was essentially a secular and not primarily a religious institution despite certain historical traditions including Protestantism. As a result, the requirement that all teachers be Protestant was held to be a violation of the Civil Rights Act.

=== Reorganization ===
According to the will, the Supreme Court of Hawaiʻi appointed trustees. After the overthrow of the Kingdom of Hawaii in 1893 and the annexation of the Republic of Hawaii by the United States, the Territorial and State Supreme Court assumed that responsibility. However, many trustees were political insiders. By 1997 trustees were paid $800,000 to $900,000 annually. At that time, critics alleged that the trustees were micromanaging the schools and that they had vastly over-rewarded themselves in their pay. Trustees were appointed to positions as "lead trustee" of a particular part of estate operations. In particular, Lokelani Lindsey, lead trustee for educational affairs, was blamed for low morale among students and faculty.

On August 9, 1997, University of Hawaiʻi (UH) Board of Regents Chair (and former Kamehameha Schools Principal) Gladys Brandt, retired judge Walter Heen, Msgr. Charles Kekumano, federal judge Samuel Pailthorpe King, and UH William S. Richardson School of Law professor Randall Roth published a report titled Broken Trust in the Honolulu Star Bulletin. They called on the State Attorney General to fully investigate KSBE management. The report alleged, among other things, that:

- the method of selecting trustees (appointment by the Hawaiʻi Supreme Court) was flawed
- the trustees did not fully understand their responsibilities
- the trustees were not accountable for their actions.

On August 12, 1997, Governor Ben Cayetano directed Attorney General Margery Bronster to perform a preliminary investigation into the allegations. In her report on September 10, 1997, she found that "the rights of the beneficiaries may be at substantial risk," and that there were "credible allegations that the intent of Bernice Pauahi Bishop is not being implemented." Another essay appeared in November, with Brandt, University of Hawaiʻi Professor Isabella Abbott, respected Hawaiian cultural educator Winona Beamer, and others as authors. Its headline was "Tyranny, distrust, poor decisions reign at Kamehameha".

The investigation continued through 1998, when Attorney General Bronster sought the permanent removal of Lindsey and fellow trustees Richard Wong and Henry Peters. On May 6, 1999, after a six-month trial, Lindsey was permanently removed as trustee (Lindsey later appealed her removal). A day later, trustees Wong, Peters, and Gerard Jervis were also temporarily removed. The fifth trustee, Oswald Stender, voluntarily resigned. An interim board was appointed by the Hawaii Probate Court to run the estate.

Bronster had been re-appointed as attorney general by Governor Cayetano, who was a Democrat. Since 23 of the 25 state senators were Democrats, some political observers thought approval of Bronster's renomination would be assured. However, the investigation proved costly for Bronster, whose confirmation was defeated by the Hawaii State Senate on April 28, 1999, by a vote of 14–11.

The US Internal Revenue Service retroactively revoked Bishop Estate's tax exempt status because of the trustees' breach of duties and unlawful use of tax exempt charitable trust assets for political lobbying. This action triggered charges of about $1 billion in back taxes and penalties.

Jervis resigned permanently on August 20, 1999. The trials for permanent removal of the remaining three trustees were set for December 13, 1999. Wong offered his permanent resignation on December 3, 1999; Peters did the same on December 13; and Lindsey voluntarily resigned on December 17. Many of the court files relating to Bishop Estate were ordered sealed by the court, citing the need for "closure and healing."

Although new Bishop Estate trustees were appointed, they had continued to use the same attorneys and law firms as their predecessors. Deputy attorneys general advised the replacement trustees that these attorneys and law firms either had provided flawed legal advice to the previous trustees, or stood by silently while the trustees had ignored good advice. Some claimed "there had been no thorough housecleaning; instead, the old guard had been put in charge and handed the keys."

In 2002, the Hawaii Supreme Court threw out the criminal indictments against three Bishop Estate trustees on procedural grounds and ruled no new charges could be brought. In 2005, two of the authors of the newspaper series published a book exploring the issues in the full-scale investigation. The controversy was costly to the schools. In 2009, after a large decline in the endowment, trustee compensation ranged from $97,500 to $125,000 per year, and trustees turned down any pay increases.

== Campuses and governance ==
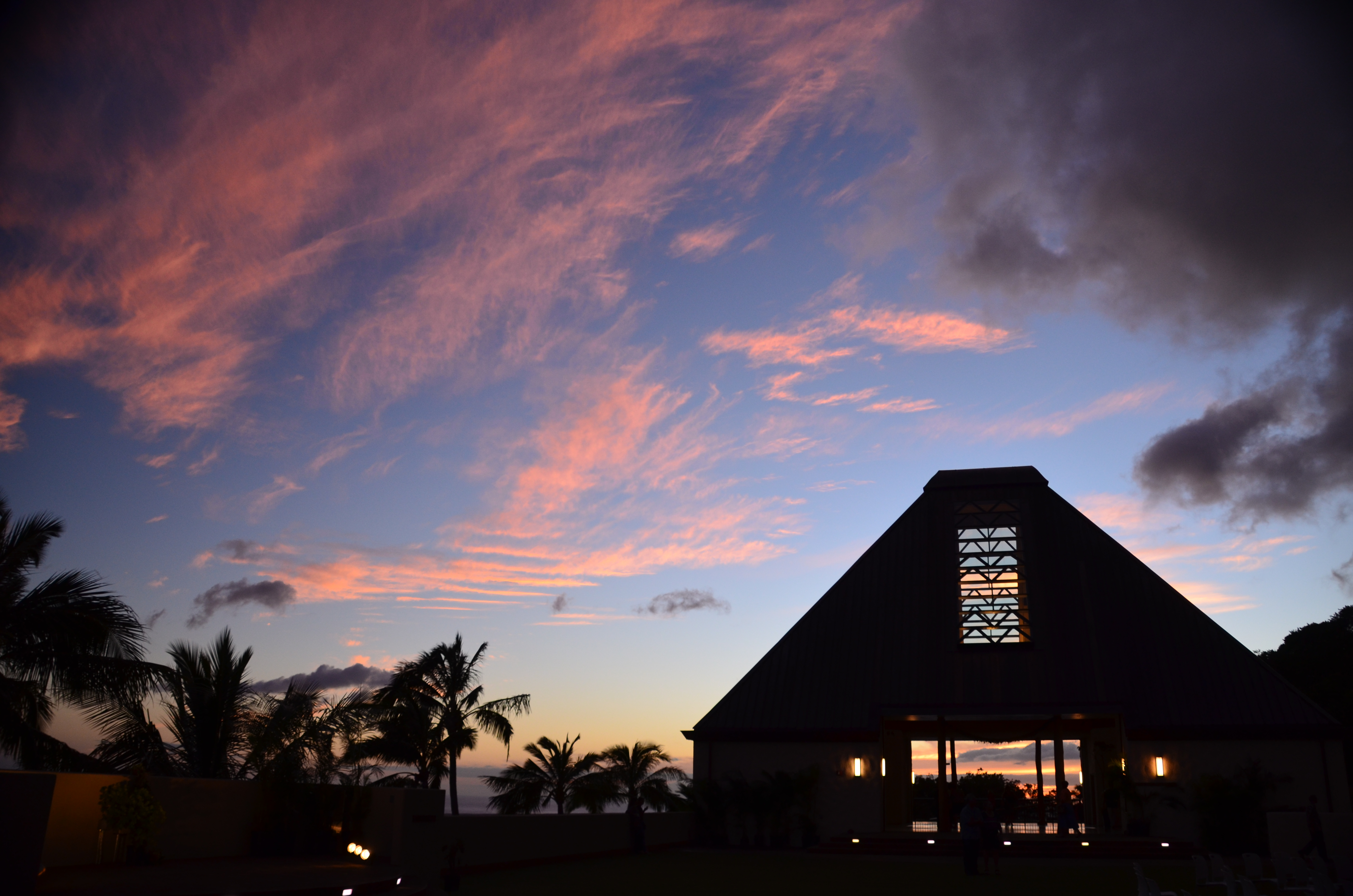
Kaʻiwakīloumoku Hawaiian Cultural Center: Myron "Pinky" Thompson Hale

Kamehameha Schools operates three campuses, which together served 5,398 students K-12 in the 2011–12 school year. The main campus, established in 1887 as the Kamehameha Schools for Boys, occupies 600 acres (2.4 km^{2}) on Kapālama Heights in Honolulu and served 3,200 students, including 550 boarding students from the Neighbor Islands (i.e., the Hawaiian Islands other than Oahu). The campus has more than 70 buildings, including numerous classroom buildings, dormitories, and maintenance shops. It also features extensive athletic facilities, including a 3,000-seat stadium, an Olympic-size swimming pool, three gymnasiums, and several tennis courts.

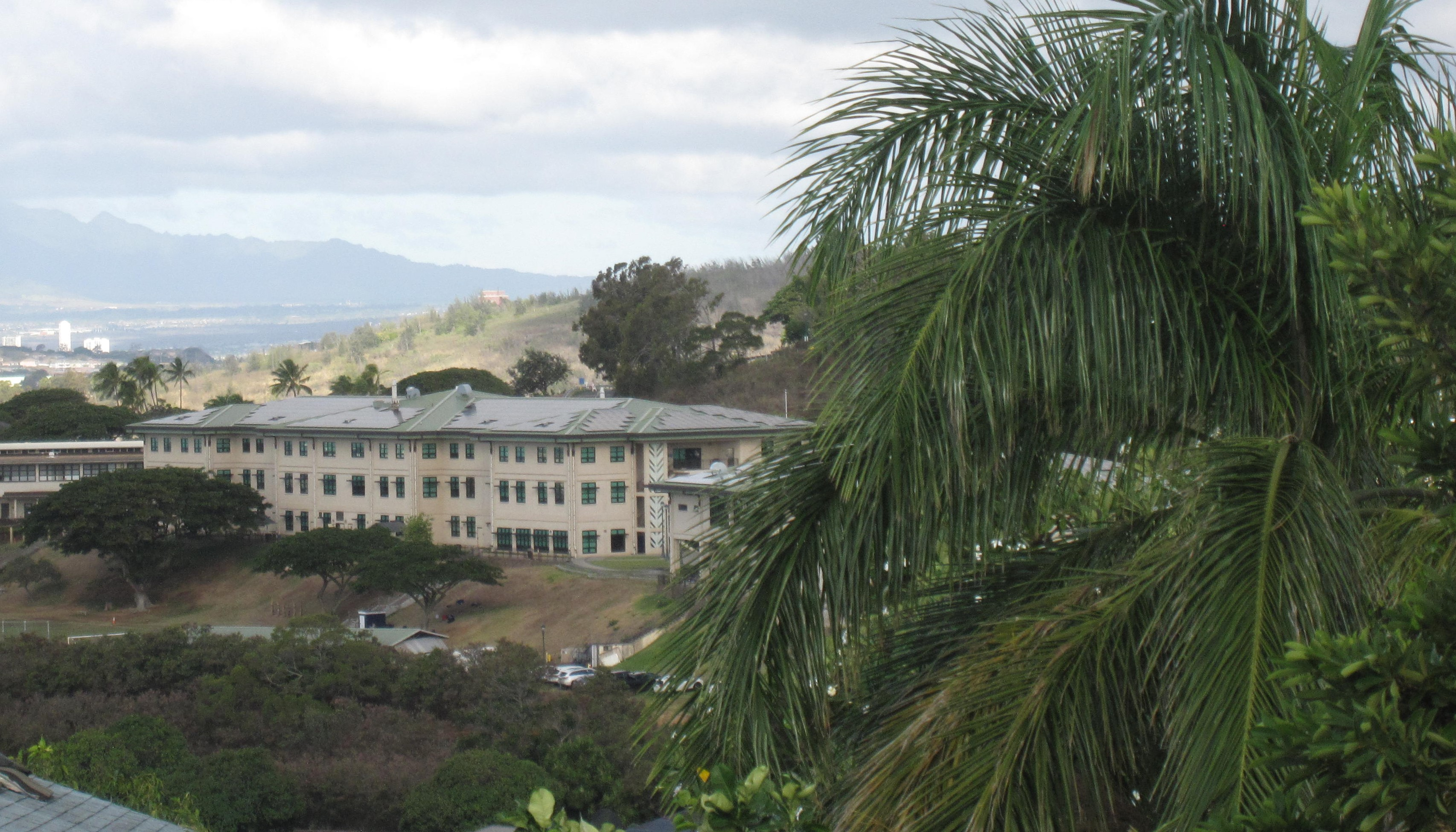
Kamehameha School Kapālama Campus

In 2010, Kamehameha undertook a $118.5 million construction project featuring a brand-new middle school, a Hawaiian cultural center, a new athletics building, and a parking structure. The Kaʻiwakīloumoku Hawaiian Cultural Center opened in October 2012, followed by the other projects in 2013.

The 180-acre (0.73 km^{2}) Maui campus, established in 1996 in Pukalani, served 1,084 students. The 300-acre (1.2 km^{2}) campus on the island of Hawaiʻi, established in 2001 in Keaʻau, served 1,118 students. In addition to these three campuses, Kamehameha Schools operates thirty-one preschools throughout Hawaiʻi, which served 1,317 students statewide.

The five-member Board of Trustees of the Estate of Bernice Pauahi Bishop administers the Schools. Each trustee may serve up to two five-year terms. The 1999 reorganization limited Board micromanagement. A Chief Executive Officer manages day-to-day operations and has autonomy over educational matters.

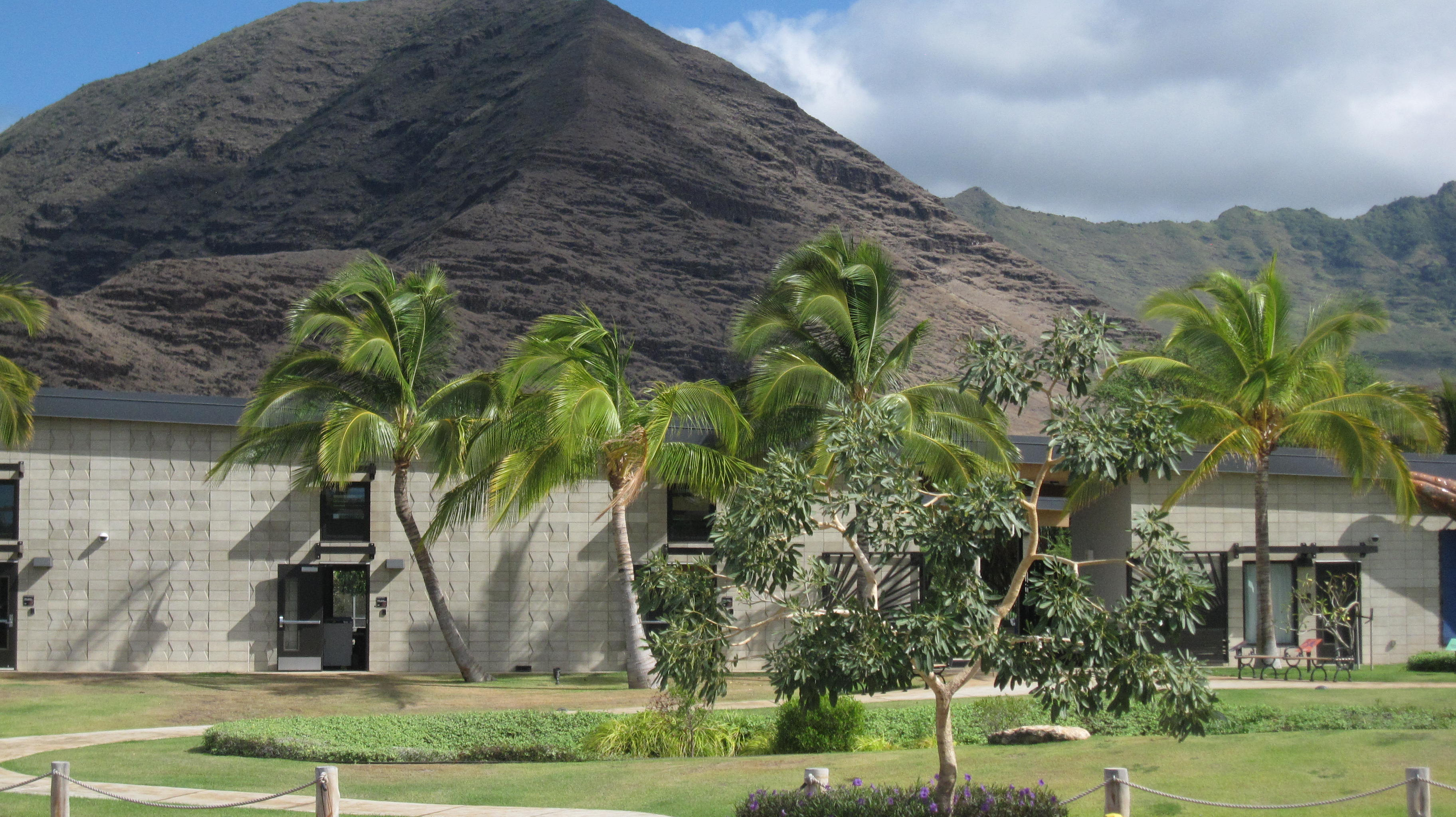
Kalanihookaha Community Learning Center on the Waianae coast of Oahu, Hawaii

In April 2021, Kamehameha Schools opened the Kalanihookaha Community Learning Center in Nānākuli.

== Endowment ==
A 1995 Wall Street Journal article described the Bishop Estate as "the nation's wealthiest charity," with an endowment estimated at $10 billion – greater than the combined endowments of Harvard and Yale universities. As of June 2011, the endowment was US$9.06 billion. Approximately 75% of the endowment is in financial assets, and 25% is in real estate. In 2016, the endowment was $11.1 billion, and in 2021, it was $14.7 billion. When compared against the endowments of major U.S. colleges and universities, only nine schools (Harvard University, Yale University, Stanford University, Princeton University, Massachusetts Institute of Technology, University of Pennsylvania, University of Notre Dame, the University of Texas and Northwestern University), have higher endowments than Kamehameha Schools.

== Land holdings ==
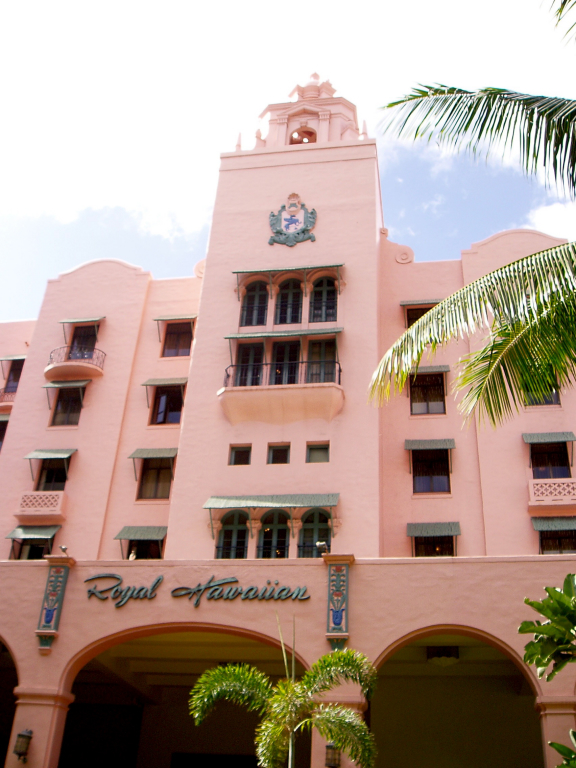
The Royal Hawaiian Hotel is located on land owned by Kamehameha Schools.

Bishop's original bequest consisted of 375,000 acres (1,520 km^{2}) of land worth around $474,000. More than 365,000 acres (1,480 km^{2}) are still controlled by the estate. The book value of the land for accounting purposes is probably much lower than fair market value. Kamehameha Schools' Land Assets Division manages nearly 360,000 acres (1,500 km^{2}) of this land, which is used for agricultural and conservation purposes. The remaining 5,000 acres (20 km^{2}) are designated for commercial use; approximately 1,500 acres (6.1 km^{2}) of those acres actively generate revenue.

Kamehameha Schools' commercial real estate includes owned and operated properties and ground lease holdings. Commercial properties operating on Kamehameha Schools land include shopping centers, such as Windward Mall, Pearlridge, Kahala Mall, and Royal Hawaiian Center; and hotels, such as the Kahala Hotel & Resort, the Four Seasons Resort Hualālai, and the Royal Hawaiian Hotel.

Kamehameha is also redeveloping several of its urban real estate properties in Haleʻiwa, Kāhala, Kakaʻako, Kapālama, and Mōʻiliʻili to revitalize those areas and increase commercial revenue.

On October 22, 2013, Kamehameha Schools announced that it would sell the buildings of its largest single real estate property (in terms of value), the Royal Hawaiian Center. The shopping center encompasses three blocks of prime Waikīkī real estate on Kalākaua Avenue.

In August 2024, Kamehameha Schools was part of a $4 billion settlement related to the 2023 Maui fire. The school was a party to the lawsuit due to their ownership of large parcels of land which were poorly maintained, which in turn fed the wildfires.

== Admission ==
Kamehameha Schools is a private organization to which students apply for admission. At the Kapālama campus, the process is highly selective. Acceptance rates range from approximately 6.7% to 14.7% depending on the grade for which a student applies. Acceptance rates at the Maui and Hawaiʻi campuses are generally higher, ranging from approximately 9.2% to 24%, due to those islands' smaller populations and the lack of boarding students at those facilities. The current enrollment is >6,900 students.

In accordance with a century-old interpretation of the will of Bernice Pauahi Bishop, Kamehameha Schools gives preference to applicants of Native Hawaiian descent "to the extent permitted by law." Orphans and indigent applicants receive special consideration as adjured in Pauahi's will. Preference applicants must submit evidence verifying that at least one of their pre-1959 ancestors is Hawaiian.

The schools' admissions policy has been a subject of controversy. Because far more applicants claim Hawaiian ancestry than the schools can admit, virtually all students have some Native Hawaiian ancestry. Non-Hawaiians have attended and graduated, but this is extremely rare. In 2002, Kamehameha admitted one non-Hawaiian student, Kalani Rosell, to its Maui campus, for the first time in 40 years. Rosell was admitted after all qualified Hawaiian applicants had been admitted. This decision sparked alumni protest. Kamehameha's admissions policy was the focus of two federal lawsuits, which contended that preferring Native Hawaiians is a race-based exclusion that violates U.S. civil rights law. Both lawsuits have since been settled and the admission policy stands today.

=== Mohica-Cummings lawsuit ===
In August 2003, Brayden Gay Mohica-Cummings was a seventh-grader admitted to Kapālama Heights after his mother, who is the hānai (adopted) daughter of a Hawaiian family, said he was Hawaiian. The school rescinded its admission offer when his mother was unable to document his ancestry. Because Kamehameha rescinded the offer only a week before the school year started, his family sued the school for admission. Chief Judge David Alan Ezra issued a temporary restraining order requiring Kamehameha to admit Mohica-Cummings. The case was settled out-of-court in November 2003, when Kamehameha Schools agreed to let Mohica-Cummings attend, in exchange for dropping the lawsuit.

=== John Doe v. Kamehameha ===
In June 2003, a suit was filed on behalf of an unidentified non-Hawaiian student, claiming that preferring Hawaiian applicants violates provisions of the Civil Rights Act that prohibits racial discrimination in private contracts. In November, now Senior Judge Alan Cooke Kay ruled in favor of Kamehameha again, dismissing the lawsuit and finding that Kamehameha Schools' policy served a "legitimate, remedial purpose by improving native Hawaiians' socioeconomic and educational disadvantages".

In August 2005, however, a three-judge panel of the Ninth Circuit Court of Appeals reversed 2–1, and ruled that the policy was racially exclusionary. A protest march by native Hawaiians, including Hawaiʻi's governor and lieutenant governor, to ʻIolani Palace and a rally on the palace grounds attracted an estimated 10,000–15,000 participants.

The Ninth Circuit agreed to rehear the appeal before a 15-judge en banc panel in February 2006. On December 5, 2006, by a vote of 8–7, the en banc panel reversed the earlier decision by the three-judge panel, affirming Judge Kay's earlier ruling. The majority ruled that Kamehameha's policy does not run afoul of a civil rights law, citing what it said were unique factors in the history of Hawaiʻi, the socioeconomic plight of Native Hawaiians, and the schools' distinctively remedial mission, which Congress has repeatedly endorsed. The dissent stated that civil rights law "prohibits a private school from denying admission to prospective students because of their race." It was very skeptical of the majority interpretation, stating, "The fact that Congress has passed some measures promoting Native Hawaiian education says nothing about whether Congress intended to exempt Native Hawaiian schools from § 1981 [civil rights law]".

Following the decision, the plaintiff's attorneys appealed to the United States Supreme Court. However, before the Supreme Court decided whether to hear the case, Doe v. Kamehameha was settled. Both this settlement and the Ninth Circuit's decision prompted a procession at the Kapālama campus, leading to an all-school assembly. On February 8, 2008, John Goemans, attorney for John Doe, disclosed that the amount of the settlement was $7 million USD.

On August 6, 2008, Kamehameha Schools announced that it had sued John Doe for breaching a confidentiality agreement by making the settlement amount public. After Goemans died, Doe's family settled, agreeing to pay $1.4 million to the school.

Also in 2008, John Doe's attorneys, Eric Grant and David Rosen, filed another lawsuit against Kamehameha on behalf of four other non-Hawaiian children who wanted to attend the school. As in the prior John Doe lawsuit, the plaintiffs sought to proceed anonymously, fearing harassment if their identities were made public. In the prior case, Kamehameha never objected to the plaintiff's anonymity, but in this case the school did object. A U.S. magistrate judge and then district court judge ruled that the plaintiffs could only continue the lawsuit under their real names, deciding that the prejudice to the defendants and the public's interest in open courts outweighed the plaintiffs' fears of harm. A Ninth Circuit panel affirmed that decision in 2010. Later that year, the Ninth Circuit refused a request for rehearing en banc, although several judges wrote lengthy dissents, referring to "Kill Haole Day" at Hawaii's schools and arguing the plaintiffs' safety would be jeopardized without anonymity. In 2011, the Supreme Court declined to review the decision and the plaintiffs chose to end the lawsuit rather than reveal their identities.

=== Sex abuse settlements ===
On April 24, 2020, it was revealed that Kamehameha Schools had paid $80 million in settlements. The settlements involve sex abuse claims against psychiatrist Robert Browne, who was said to have sexually abused children in the 1960s and 1970s while serving at the schools.

== Academics ==
All three of Kamehameha's campuses are college-preparatory and offer honors courses. In addition, the Kapālama campus offers 20 Advanced Placement courses, while the Hawaiʻi campus offers eight. The Kapālama high school administered 344 Advanced Placement exams in 2014.

Upper-class students at the Maui and Hawaiʻi campus high schools select a career academy based on their individual interests. They develop course schedules designed to enhance skills for potential careers within their academy's scope. The Maui campus offers academies for arts and communication, business, information technology or engineering, and science and natural resources, while the Hawaiʻi campus offers academies for humanities and STE(A)M (science, technology, engineering, (arts), and mathematics).

Approximately 70% of Kamehameha graduates enroll in four-year universities, while 25% enroll in two-year colleges or technical schools. Students in the 2010 graduating class of the Kapālama campus had an average composite SAT score of 1560 out of 2400. In the 2014 graduating class, there were 4 National Merit semi-finalists and 9 commended students.

As students each have Native Hawaiian ancestry, Kamehameha emphasizes Hawaiian language and culture in its curriculum. The Kapālama high school offers a six-year program in Hawaiian language and requires its students to achieve Hawaiian language proficiency equivalent to one year of study. It also offers various supplementary courses in Hawaiian culture, history, literature, song composition and performance, chant, dance, and crafts.

== Community outreach ==
Kamehameha offers several distance learning programs for high school students, adults, and educators to learn Hawaiian language and culture over the Internet. The program includes an archived series of instructional videos entitled Kulāiwi for learning the Hawaiian language; these are available for free online streaming. Kamehameha also operates Kamehameha Publishing, which prints and sells Hawaiian-language books, posters, and multimedia.

As a part of its 2000-2015 Strategic Plan, generated by wide community input, Kamehameha Schools partners with more than 20 community-based organizations across the archipelago through its ʻAina Ulu program to deliver natural and cultural resource stewardship education programs and services to over 25,000 participants annually. ʻAina Ulu provides an asset-management strategy by integrating community, education, cultural, environmental and economic outcomes to manage resources and lands to enhance prudent and sustainable use, responsible stewardship and supportive community relationships. By engaging community volunteers and expertise, ʻAina Ulu partners manage, protect and restore native watershed, dryland and rain forests; riparian, coastal, and estuarine ecosystems, including Hawaiian fishponds; and Hawaiian food systems, including dry field systems, as well as wet field systems call loʻi.

Kamehameha also offers several programs and services for high school graduates. Along with the Ke Aliʻi Pauahi Foundation, Kamehameha offers a variety of need and merit-based scholarships for those pursuing undergraduate and postgraduate education. Its career counseling program provides advice and counseling for post-high school students and operates an internship program for various companies statewide. The First Nations' Futures Program, operated in conjunction with Stanford University and the University of Hawaiʻi at Mānoa, is a fellowship program designed to develop "a select team of emerging leaders... to become significant community contributors in natural, cultural and land stewardship."

== Song contest ==
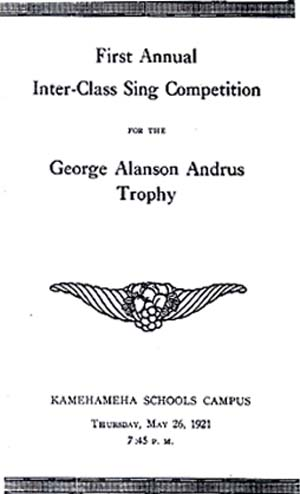
Program from the first song contest of the School for Boys, on May 26, 1921

The Kamehameha Schools Song Contest is an annual choral competition in which groups of students of the Kapālama campus perform Hawaiian mele. The event, hosted in Honolulu, is broadcast live on TV and is also live streamed online. According to the 2008 program, the goals of the contest are to develop leadership and foster cooperation and class spirit among the students as well as to increase student awareness of their cultural heritage by allowing them to use their singing voices to express themselves.

The first contest (then called the Inter-class Sing Competition) was held in 1921. It was started to perpetuate the memory of George Alanson Andrus, a music teacher at the School. The event was originally held on campus, but moved to the Neal S. Blaisdell Center (formerly the Honolulu International Auditorium) in 1964 where it has been held ever since. The 2008 contest was featured in the PBS documentary One Voice.

== Notable people ==
- Isabella Abbott – Class of 1937, authority on Central Pacific algae and Hawaiian plants
- Daniel K. Akaka – Class of 1942, United States Senator from Hawaii (1990–2012)
- Paula Akana – journalist
- Kekuni Blaisdell – Class of 1980, Professor of Medicine (University of Chicago and University of Hawaiʻi), first native Hawaiian chairperson of a department of medicine
- Brian Ching – Class of 1996, professional Major League Soccer player
- Micah Christenson – Class of 2011, professional American volleyball player, member of the United States men's national volleyball team
- Kaili Chun – Class of 1980, installation artist
- Nora Stewart Coleman – Class of 1938, former First Lady of American Samoa
- Auliʻi Cravalho – Class of 2018, voice of Moana in the 2016 Disney film Moana
- Kamalani Dung – Class of 2015, Olympic medalist and professional softball player for Athletes Unlimited (2020-Present)
- Caprice Dydasco – Class of 2011, professional soccer player for the Washington Spirit
- Makoa Freitas – Professional American football player for Indianapolis Colts
- Blane Gaison – Class of 1976, NFL defensive back for the Atlanta Falcons (1981–1985)
- Brickwood Galuteria – Class of 1973, Hawaiʻi State Senator
- Heather Giugni – Hawaiʻi State Representative
- Kamu Grugier-Hill – Class of 2012, NFL linebacker for the Philadelphia Eagles (2016–2019) and Miami Dolphins (2020–Present)
- Kapena Gushiken – Class of 2021, college football safety for the Ole Miss Rebels
- Clayton Hee – Class of 1971, Hawaiʻi State Senator
- Don Ho – Class of 1949, musician and entertainer. His children also attended the school.
- Kelly Hu – Class of 1986, Actress and Miss Teen USA 1985, Miss Hawaii USA 1993
- David Hughes – Class of 1977, NFL running back for the Seattle Seahawks and Pittsburgh Steelers (1981–86)
- Rylee "Anuhea" Jenkins – Class of 2003, singer and songwriter
- Krystal Ka`ai - Class of 2006, first Native Hawaiian Executive Director of the White House Initiative on Asian Americans, Native Hawaiians and Pacific Islanders (2021-) and of the Congressional Asian Pacific American Caucus (2013–21)
- Duke Kahanamoku – Class of 1910, Olympic swimmer
- Brook Mahealani Lee – Class of 1989, Miss Hawaii USA 1997, Miss USA 1997 and Miss Universe 1997
- Ikaika Malloe – Class of 1991, former college football safety and linebacker and current defensive coordinator for the UCLA Bruins football
- Jamaica Osorio – Class of 2008, poet, activist, and professor at the University of Hawaiʻi at Mānoa
- Jonathan Kamakawiwoʻole Osorio – Class of 1969, Dean of the Hawaiʻinuiākea School of Hawaiian Knowledge, University of Hawaiʻi at Mānoa
- Andrew Poepoe - Class of 1953, Hawaii state legislator and engineer
- Marlene Sai – musician and performer
- Bronson Sardinha – Professional MLB outfielder
- Meleana Shim – Class of 2009, professional soccer player for the Portland Thorns FC
- Mana Silva – Class of 2006, NFL strong safety for the Buffalo Bills and Dallas Cowboys (2011–12)
- Malama Solomon Ph.D. – Class of 1969, First OHA Trustee, Hawaiʻi State Senator
- Louis Keouli Thompson – Class of 1900, musician and performer
- Haunani-Kay Trask – Class of 1967, Hawaiian activist
- Mililani Trask – Class of 1969, Hawaiian activist
- John Henry Wise – Class of 1887, Hawaiian politician
- Kolten Wong – Class of 2008, Major League Baseball player for the St. Louis Cardinals and Milwaukee Brewers
- Hinaleimoana Wong-Kalu – Class of 1990, kumu hula and community leader

== See also ==
- Kamehameha Schools Hawaii Campus
- Waipa Foundation
