= Louis Keouli Thompson =

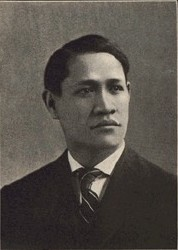
- Louis Keouli Thompson aka Segis Luvaun

Background information
- Also known as: Segis Luvaun
- Born: Louis Thompson; April 22, 1882; Honolulu, Oahu, Kingdom of Hawai'i
- Died: July 15, 1937 Kittanning, Armstrong County, Pennsylvania
- Genres: Hawaiian Folk
- Occupations: Musician, singer-songwriter
- Instruments: Vocals, Ukulele, Steel Guitar, Violin
- Years active: 1900–1922

Louis Keouli Thompson (April 22, 1882 – July 15, 1937), better known by his stage name Segis Luvaun, was a Hawaiian singer and musician and the reported King of Ukulele Players. Thompson, native to Hawai'i, claimed United States citizenship when Hawaii was annexed by the United States as a territory in 1898. He performed much of his life, first touring the United States and later throughout Scandinavia and Europe, many times for royalty.

== Personal life ==
Louis Thompson was born in Honolulu in the Kingdom of Hawaii in 1882. The earliest known record of him is the 1900 census showing him as a 17-year-old student at the Kamehameha School, then known as the Kamehameha School for Boys. Indeed, Thompson is shown in the school's Class of 1900 class photo. The 1900 census shows both his parents being from the Hawaiian Islands. A 1919 Visa application, filled out by Thompson, records his father's name as Keouli Tawmsen and a 1916 Visa application indicated that his father was deceased at that time. However, on the marriage license to Eveline Walters (shown below), indicates his father's name is 'Carlo Luvaun'. No other information is known about his family.

Thompson married Mildred Elnora Rupp on July 26, 1910, in Chicago, Illinois. At the time, Thompson went by Lu, with his full name on the marriage license recorded as Lu Kaoly Thompson. Rupp was born on October 26, 1893, in Winfield, Kansas. Although Thompson was actually 28 and Rupp was 17 at the time, the marriage license shows them as 26 and 21, respectively. He and Rupp had one child, Billven Keouli Thompson, born December 16, 1911, in Topeka, Kansas. Billven is Thompson's only known child.

Sometime after marrying Rupp in 1910 and before leaving for Europe in 1914, Thompson married Moana. Although little is known about Moana, including her maiden name, one might speculate that she was the inspiration behind Thompson's chart 'Moana Waltz'.

Thompson married Eveline Walters on April 7, 1917, in St Giles, London, England. At this time, Thompson was 35 and Walters was 21. She was born on September 11, 1896, in Somersetshire, England. and her father's name was Gaius Walters

Within three years (1903) of graduating from Kamehameha School for Boys, Thompson had already left his homeland of Hawai'i for the mainland of the United States. He toured there for ten years before moving to London in 1914. In 1919, he moved to Copenhagen, Denmark. By 1922, he once again moved, this time to Prague, Czechoslovakia. His last known residence in Europe, per Visa applications, was Riga, Latvia. He remained in Europe until September 1936 when he returned to the United States sailing from Marseille to Boston. He died of heart failure in a Pennsylvania hospital, on July 15, 1937.

== Career ==
Much of Thompson's career has been gathered through newspaper ads and articles, as well as mentions in books about the Hawaiian music movement at the time. According to Kamehameha School archives, Thompson had left for the United States mainland by 1902 or 1903. Several articles show him touring in the United States as early as 1907 and as late as 1913. In his book How to Play the Ukulele, Thompson records that he was discovered in 1912 while touring in the United States by Sir Walter de Freece, who brought him to Europe. Tracking his travels through passport and visa applications shows that he lived and performed in locations such as London, Oslo, Copenhagen, the Netherlands, Germany, and Switzerland from 1914 to 1931.

=== United States Tour (1902–1913) ===
Thompson was manager of a troupe called the Honolulu Students that he toured with across various venues within the United States. The stage name that he used while with the Honolulu Students is Professor Lu Thompson Keouli. During 1907 and 1908, Thompson, along with the Honolulu Students toured as part of the Chautauqua circuit

Date	Location	Event
1907?	Amherst, Massachusetts – Amherst College	Chautauqua performance of the Honolulu Students.
October 25, 1907	Northampton, Massachusetts	Chautauqua performance of the Honolulu Students.
October 28, 1907	Hartford, Connecticut	Chautauqua performance of the Honolulu Students.
November 13, 1907	Baldwinsville, New York	Chautauqua performance of the Honolulu Students.
November 14, 1907	Port Henry, New York	Chautauqua performance of the Honolulu Students.
November 15, 1907	Brandon, Vermont	Chautauqua performance of the Honolulu Students.
November 16, 1907	Bristol, Vermont	Chautauqua performance of the Honolulu Students.
November 18, 1907	Cambridge, Vermont	Chautauqua performance of the Honolulu Students.
January 27, 1909	Jamestown, New York Y.M.C.A.	Performance of the Honolulu Students as reported in the Hawaiian Gazette. Thompson listed as Professor Keouli.
Nov 1913	Madison, Wisconsin – Orpheum Theatre	Newspaper advertisement for "The Tawmsen's" performing at the Orpheum Theatre.

=== European Tour (1914–1928) ===
Date	Location	Event
TBD	TBD	TBD

== Stage Names ==
Thompson appears to have been very prolific with his epithet. Although there is no record of why he chose different aliases, he chose both unique names and spellings at different times in his career. Below is a list of names he was known to use.

- Juan Akoni
- L. Thompson
- Lewis Thompson
- Louis K Thompson
- Lu Kaoly Thompson
- Lu Keouli Thompson
- Luvaun
- Luvaun Tawmsen
- San Juan
- Segis Luvaun

== Discography ==
=== 1916 His Master's Voice Label (London, England) ===
Recorded in London, England under the His Master's Voice label as Segis Luvaun

Year	Song	Ctrl#	Album	Notes
1916	"Yaaka Hula Hickey Dula" (Goetz, Young and Wendling)	HO3059ae	B-703	Hawaiian Guitar, Vocal
1916	"You've Got To Do It" ("Pell Mell" Revue)(Nat D. Ayer)	HO3060ae	B-726	Vocal, Guitar
1916	Unidentified Title	HO3061ae	?	Hawaiian Guitar, Vocal
1916	"Moana Waltz" (Luvaun)	HO3062ae	B-726	Hawaiian Guitar
1916	"A Broken Doll" (Tate)("Samples" revue)	HO3063ae	B-701	Hawaiian Guitar, Vocal
1916	"If You Were The Only Girl in the World" (Ayer)("The Bing Boys Are Here")	HO3064/5	B-703	Hawaiian Guitar, Vocal

=== 1917 Zonophone label (London, England) ===
Recorded in London, England under the Zonophone label as Juan Akoni

Year	Song	Ctrl#	Album	Notes
1917	"Come and Dance With Me"	y20732e	1879	Ukulele/Hawaiian Guitar
1917	Unidentified Title	y20733e	?	Ukulele/Hawaiian Guitar
1917	"Oh How She Could Yacki Hacki Wicki Wacki Woo"	y20734e	1802	Ukulele/Hawaiian Guitar
1917	"Honolulu Tomboy"	y20735e	?	Ukulele/Hawaiian Guitar
1917	"Yaaka Hula Hickey Dula"	y20736e	1802	Ukulele/Hawaiian Guitar
1917	"Hawaiian Medley" (Luvaun)	y20737e	2055	Ukulele/Hawaiian Guitar

=== 1917 Winner Label (London, England) ===
Recorded in London, England under the Winner label as Luvaun assisted by Lady Chetwynd

Year	Song	Ctrl#	Album	Notes
1917	"My Hawaiian Butterfly" (--)	(2234)	3149	Luvaun (Ukulele/Hawaiian Guitar), Lady Chetwynd (Violin)
1917	"Ideal Girl Waltz" (--)	(2235)	3149	Luvaun (Ukulele/Hawaiian Guitar), Lady Chetwynd (Violin)
1917	"Come and Dance With Me"	(2238)	3151	Luvaun (Ukulele/Hawaiian Guitar), Lady Chetwynd (Violin)
1917	"Moana Waltz"	(2239)	3151	Luvaun (Ukulele/Hawaiian Guitar), Lady Chetwynd (Violin)
1917	"Ua Like No Alike"	5515	3240	Luvaun (Ukulele/Hawaiian Guitar), Lady Chetwynd (Violin)
1917	"Aloha Oe"	5516	3149	Luvaun (Ukulele/Hawaiian Guitar), Lady Chetwynd (Violin)

=== 1917 Zonophone Label (London, England) ===
Recorded in London, England under the Zonophone label as Juan Akoni

Year	Song	Ctrl#	Album	Notes
1917	"Along The Way To Waikiki"	y20972e	1879	Ukulele or Hawaiian Guitar
1917	Unidentified Title	y20973e	?	Ukulele or Hawaiian Guitar
1917	"Hawaiian Butterfly"	y20974e	?	Ukulele or Hawaiian Guitar
1917	"Hawaiian Butterfly"	y20975e	1847	Ukulele or Hawaiian Guitar
1917	"The Ideal Girl – Waltz" (Luvaun)	y20976e	2055	Ukulele or Hawaiian Guitar
1917	"What Do You Want To Make Those Eyes at Me For?"	y20977e	1847	Ukulele or Hawaiian Guitar

=== 1920 Ekophon Label (Saltsjöbaden, Sweden) ===
Recorded in Saltsjöbaden, Sweden under the Ekophon label as Segis Luvaun

Year	Song	Ctrl#	Album	Notes
c 1920	"Chong Fran Hongkong" (H. Weeks)	W-1152	NS-1419-I	Segis Luvaun(Ukulele), Ernst Rolf(Vocal)
c 1920	"Ukalele Waltz" (sic)	W-1153	NS-1715-II	Hawaiian guitar/ukulele
c 1920	Unidentified Title	W-1154	?	Hawaiian guitar/ukulele
c 1920	Unidentified Title	W-1155	NS-1716-?	Hawaiian guitar/ukulele
c 1920	"Original Hawaiian Waltz"	W-1153	NS-1715-I. Also Beka S-889	Hawaiian guitar/ukulele
c 1920	"My Hawaiian Sweethearth" (sic)	W-1157	NS-1714-II. Also Beka S-889	Hawaiian guitar/ukulele
c 1920	Unidentified Title	W-1160	NS-1716-?	Hawaiian guitar/ukulele
c 1920	"Sommarsol Till Sista Stund" (Dansk)	W-1161	NS-1714-I	Hawaiian guitar/ukulele
c 1920	"Hawajansk Kärlekssang"	W-1163	NS-1419-II	Ukulele
c 1920	"Karl Alfred" (Taube)	W-1193	NS-1417-I	Segis Luvaun(Ukulele), Ernst Rolf(Vocal)
c 1920	"Titta in En Annan Dag" (Rygaard)	W-1196	NS-1417-II	Segis Luvaun(Ukulele), Ernst Rolf(Vocal)

=== 1920–1921 Grammaphon/Polydor Label (Berlin, Germany) ===
Recorded in Berlin, Germany under the Grammaphon/Polydor label as Segis Luvaun

Year	Song	Ctrl#	Album	Notes
c 1920–1921	"Kilima Waltz" (S. Luvaun)	141at	14363. Also Reneyphone 14663; Polypho X/N-14636	Hawaiian guitar, English/Hawaiian vocal
c 1920–1921	"If You Could Care" (Darewsky)	142at	14363. Also Reneyphone 14663; Polyphon X/N-14636	Hawaiian guitar, English/Hawaiian vocal
c 1920–1921	"Aloha Oe" (von Queen)(sic)	143at	14364. Also Polyphon X/N-14364	Hawaiian guitar, English/Hawaiian vocal
c 1920–1921	"The Eve Waltz" (Luvaun)	---at	14367. Also Reneyphone 14367; Polyphon NS-98502	Hawaiian guitar, English/Hawaiian vocal
c 1920–1921	"Ja-Da" (Robn. Carledon)	145at	14365. Also Reneyphone 14365; Polyphon X/N-14365	Hawaiian guitar, English/Hawaiian vocal
c 1920–1921	"My Philosophy" (von S. Luvaun)	146at	14364. Also Polyphon X/N-14365	Hawaiian guitar, English/Hawaiian vocal
c 1920–1921	"Won't You Dance With Me" (Luvaun)	---at	14367. Also Reneyphone 14367; Polyphon NS-98502	Hawaiian guitar, English/Hawaiian vocal
c 1920–1921	"Moana Waltz" (Luvaun)	148at	14365. Also Reneyphone 14365; Polyphon X/N-14365	Hawaiian guitar, English/Hawaiian vocal
c 1920–1921	"Wiki-Waki" (S. Luvaun)	150at	14366. Also Polyphon 288106, NS-98500, X/N-14366	Hawaiian guitar, English/Hawaiian vocal
c 1920–1921	"After You Get What You Want, You Don't Want It" (Irving Berlin)	151at	14366. Also Polyphon X/N-14366	Hawaiian guitar, English/Hawaiian vocal

=== Early 1921 Grammaphon/Polydor Label (Berlin, Germany) ===
Recorded in Berlin, Germany under the Grammaphon/Polydor label as Segis Luvaun

Year	Song	Ctrl#	Album	Notes
c early 1921	"Beautiful" (S. Luvaun) (My Beautiful Eve)	180at	Berlin, Germany	Hawaiian guitar, English/Hawaiian vocal
c early 1921	"Cuddle and Kiss" (Jerome)	181at	14368. Also Polyphon 288109	Hawaiian guitar, English/Hawaiian vocal
c early 1921	"Ideal Girl" (Luvaun)	182at	14369. Also Reneyphone 14369; Polyphon NS-98504	Hawaiian guitar, English/Hawaiian vocal
c early 1921	"Norway (Norwegen)(La Norvege*)" (S. Luvaun)	183at	14369, 14370, 07341?. Also Reneyphone 14369*; Polyphon NS-98504, 288113, NS-98500	Hawaiian guitar, English/Hawaiian vocal
c early 1921	"I'm Forever Blowing Bubbles" (Kenbroin-Kelette)	185at	14370, 07341?	Hawaiian guitar, English/Hawaiian vocal
c early 1921	"Hawaiian Lullaby" (Luvaun)		14371	Hawaiian guitar, English/Hawaiian vocal
c early 1921	"Ua Ike No A Like" (Queen Liliuokalani)		14371. Also Polyphon X/N-288115	Hawaiian guitar, English/Hawaiian vocal
c early 1921	"Venetian Moon. Foxtrot" (Magini)		14372. Also Polyphon X/N-288117	Hawaiian guitar, English/Hawaiian vocal
c early 1921	"La Veeda" (Alden)		14372. Also Polyphon X/N-288117	Hawaiian guitar, English/Hawaiian vocal
c early 1921	"Beautiful Heroor"		X/N-288109	Hawaiian guitar, English/Hawaiian vocal

=== Late 1921 Grammaphon/Polydor Label (Berlin, Germany) ===
Recorded in Berlin, Germany under the Grammaphon/Polydor label as Segis Luvaun

Year	Song	Ctrl#	Album	Notes
c late 1921 / early 1922	"You've Got A Million Dollar Smile" (H. Darewski)	258at	14373. Also Polyphon 288119, X/N-14373	Hawaiian guitar, English/Hawaiian vocal
c late 1921 / early 1922	"Hawaiian Butterfly" (B. Baskette & J. Santley)	259at	14373. Also Polyphon 288120, X/N-14373	Hawaiian guitar, English/Hawaiian vocal
c late 1921 / early 1922	"Yaaka Hula Hickey Dula (Hawaisches Liebesständchen)" (Bernhard)		20306	Hawaiian guitar, English/Hawaiian vocal
c late 1921 / early 1922	"You've Got To Do It" (Warum?) (Ayer)		20306. Also Polyphon X/N-288115	Hawaiian guitar, English/Hawaiian vocal

=== Sept 1924 Grammaphon/Polydor Label (Berlin, Germany) ===
Recorded in Berlin, Germany under the Grammaphon/Polydor label with Eric Borchard's Jazzband

Year	Song	Ctrl#	Album	Notes
c Sept 1924	"Hula Lou!" (Halloh kleiner Schatz). Foxtrot (Yellen & King) ("Hula-Lou!" Foxtrot. Yellen et King)*	1784ax	20115. Also Reneyphone F-40407*	Segis Luvaun(Hawaiian guitar), Louis de Vries(trumpet), Emile Christian(trombone/?vocal), Eric Borchard(clarinet, tenor sax, ?vocal), Billy Bartholomew(alto sax, clarinet), Sascha Dickstein(violin), Austin Egen(piano), Harold M. Kirchstein(banjo, guitar), unidentified German(drums)

=== 1923–1926 Deutsche Grammophon Label (Berlin, Germany) ===
Recorded in Berlin, Germany under the Deutsche Grammophon label with Efim Schachmeister

Year	Song	Ctrl#	Album	Notes
c 1923–1926	Unidentified			

=== Mar 1925 Vox Label (Berlin, Germany) ===
Recorded in Berlin, Germany under Vox label as Segis Luvaun

Year	Song	Ctrl#	Album	Notes
c Mar 1925	"I Need Some Bettin'" Foxtrot (T. Fiorito & R. King) (sic)	2468-B	6248	Segis Luvaun(Hawaiian guitar), Unidentified(piano)
c Mar 1925	"Die Nacht war schwül..." Foxtrot (S. Romberg & A. Goodman)	2469-B	6231	Segis Luvaun(Hawaiian guitar), Unidentified(piano)
c Mar 1925	"California" Foxtrot (C. Conrad)	2470-B	6231	Segis Luvaun(Hawaiian guitar), Unidentified(piano)
c Mar 1925	"Waiting Around" (Davis & Hanley)	2471-B	6248	Segis Luvaun(Hawaiian guitar), Unidentified(piano)
c Mar 1925	"Nobody Lied" (Weber)	2468-B	6248	Segis Luvaun(Hawaiian guitar), Unidentified(piano)
c Mar 1925	"Shine" (F. Dabney)	----B	6234	Segis Luvaun(Hawaiian guitar), Unidentified(piano)
c Mar 1925	"And Her Mother Came Too" (O. Noello) (sic)	----B	6234	Segis Luvaun(Hawaiian guitar), Unidentified(piano)
c Mar 1925	"Sing Along" (Fr. Wood & O.P. Long)	----B	6235	Segis Luvaun(Hawaiian guitar), Unidentified(piano)
c Mar 1925	"Somebody's Wrong" (Marshall, Egan, Whiting)	----B	6235	Segis Luvaun(Hawaiian guitar), Unidentified(piano)
c Mar 1925	"Swanee River Moon" (--)	2476-B	6252. Also Derby-571b	Segis Luvaun(Hawaiian guitar), Unidentified(piano)

=== Late 1925 Vox Label (Berlin, Germany) ===
Recorded in Berlin, Germany under Vox label with Original Hawaiian Trio (Bruquil, Milissa, San Juan) as San Juan

Year	Song	Ctrl#	Album	Notes
c late 1925	"When The Clock Strikes One-Two-Three-Four" (--)	2526-B	6271	Bruquil/Milissa/San Juan(Hawaiian guitar-trio)
c late 1925	"Hawaiian Twilight" (--)	----B	6241. Also Derby-571a	Bruquil/Milissa/San Juan(Hawaiian guitar-trio)
c late 1925	"Kilima-Waltz"	----B	6241	Bruquil/Milissa/San Juan(Hawaiian guitar-trio)
c late 1925	"Pua Carnation"	----B	6242	Bruquil/Milissa/San Juan(Hawaiian guitar-trio)
c late 1925	"Dreamy Hawaii"	----B	6242	Bruquil/Milissa/San Juan(Hawaiian guitar-trio)
c late 1925	"Aloha Land" (--)	2530-B	6271	Bruquil/Milissa/San Juan(Hawaiian guitar-trio)

=== Sept–Oct 1925 Winner Label (London, England) ===
Recorded in London, England under Winner label as Segis Luvaun

Year	Song	Ctrl#	Album	Notes
c Sept–Oct 1925	"Sunny Hawaii" Waltz		4323	Segis Luvaun(Hawaiian guitar), Unknown(violin)
c Sept–Oct 1925	"My Eve" Waltz		4323	Segis Luvaun(Hawaiian guitar), Unknown(violin)
c Sept–Oct 1925	"At Dusk" Waltz (Luvaun)	9634-2	4433	Segis Luvaun(Hawaiian guitar), Unknown(violin)
c Sept–Oct 1925	"Prancing" Foxtrot (Luvaun)	9635-1	4433	Segis Luvaun(Hawaiian guitar), Unknown(violin)

=== 1925–1926 The Bell Label (London, England) ===
Recorded in London, England under The Bell label as Unknown

Year	Song	Ctrl#	Album	Notes
c 1925–1926	"At Dusk"	435-	735, 758	possibly Segis Luvaun(Hawaiian guitar)
c 1925–1926	"My Eve"	436-?	351, 735	possibly Segis Luvaun(Hawaiian guitar)
c 1925–1926	"London" Foxtrot	437–1	357, 732, 758	possibly Segis Luvaun(Hawaiian guitar)
c 1925–1926	"Prancing"	?	360	possibly Segis Luvaun(Hawaiian guitar)
c 1925–1926	"Moana Waltz"	439–1	363	possibly Segis Luvaun(Hawaiian guitar)

=== Mar 1928 Grammaphon/Polydor Label (Berlin, Germany) ===
Recorded in Berlin, Germany under Grammaphon/Polydor label as Segis Luvaun

Year	Song	Ctrl#	Album	Notes
c Mar 1928	"Aloha-Oe" Foxtrot (Luvaun)	63br	21321. Also Polydor(F)-21321	Segis Luvaun(Hawaiian guitar), Possibly Nikolaus Brodsky(piano), Probably Segis Luvaun(English/Hawaiian vocal), 2 unidentified(vocal)
c Mar 1928	"Sunny Havanna" Foxtrot (Nicholls)	64br	21321. Also Polydor(F)-21321	Segis Luvaun(Hawaiian guitar), Possibly Nikolaus Brodsky(piano), Probably Segis Luvaun(English/Hawaiian vocal), 2 unidentified(vocal)
c Mar 1928	"Kilima-Valse" (Luvaun)	65½br	21322. Also Polydor(F)-21322, Polyphon NS-98508.	Segis Luvaun(Hawaiian guitar), Possibly Nikolaus Brodsky(piano), Probably Segis Luvaun(English/Hawaiian vocal), 2 unidentified(vocal)
c Mar 1928	"Ma-Oui Girl" Foxtrot (Kealakai)	66br	21322. Also Polydor(F)-21322, Polyphon NS-98508.	Segis Luvaun(Hawaiian guitar), Possibly Nikolaus Brodsky(piano), Probably Segis Luvaun(English/Hawaiian vocal), 2 unidentified(vocal)
c Mar 1928	"Yaaka-Hula-Hicki-Dula" Foxtrot (Bernard)	67br	*21323. Also Polydor(F)-32323, Polyphon NS-98510A	Segis Luvaun(Hawaiian guitar), Possibly Nikolaus Brodsky(piano), Probably Segis Luvaun(English/Hawaiian vocal), 2 unidentified(vocal)
c Mar 1928	"Wela-Ka-Hao" Foxtrot (Luvaun)	68br	21323. Also Polydor(F)-21323, Polyphon NS-98510B	Segis Luvaun(Hawaiian guitar), Possibly Nikolaus Brodsky(piano), Probably Segis Luvaun(English/Hawaiian vocal), 2 unidentified(vocal)

=== Apr 1928 Grammaphon/Polydor Label (Berlin, Germany) ===
Recorded in Berlin, Germany under Grammaphon/Polydor label as Segis Luvaun

Year	Song	Ctrl#	Album	Notes
c Apr 1928	"Always (Heimweh)" (Irving Berlin)	132br	21666	Probably Segis Luvaun, Nikolaus Brodsky(vocal-duet), Unidentified(banjo)
c Apr 1928	"Moana Rose. Lied" (Luvaun)	br	21417	Probably Segis Luvaun, Nikolaus Brodsky(vocal-duet), Unidentified(banjo)
c Apr 1928	"Nach der Heimat. Volkslied"	134br	21666	Probably Segis Luvaun, Nikolaus Brodsky(vocal-duet), Unidentified(banjo)
c Apr 1928	"Melodie in F" (Rubinstein)	135br	21665. Also Polyphon NS-98514	Probably Segis Luvaun, Nikolaus Brodsky(vocal-duet), Unidentified(banjo)
c Apr 1928	"Romance of Eve" (Luvaun)	136br	21665. Also Polyphon NS-98514	Probably Segis Luvaun, Nikolaus Brodsky(vocal-duet), Unidentified(banjo)
c Apr 1928	"Marcheta. Lied" (Schertzinger)	br	21417	Probably Segis Luvaun, Nikolaus Brodsky(vocal-duet), Unidentified(banjo)
c Apr 1928	"Mondnacht. Lied"	138½br	21664	Probably Segis Luvaun, Nikolaus Brodsky(vocal-duet), Unidentified(banjo)
c Apr 1928	"Lysistrata. Glühwürmchen-Idyll" (Paul Lincke)	139br	21664	Probably Segis Luvaun, Nikolaus Brodsky(vocal-duet), Unidentified(banjo)
c Apr 1928	"One, Two, Three, Four" (Reading)	140br	21416	Probably Segis Luvaun, Nikolaus Brodsky(vocal-duet), Unidentified(banjo)
c Apr 1928	"Tell All The World" (--)	141br	21416	Probably Segis Luvaun, Nikolaus Brodsky(vocal-duet), Unidentified(banjo)

== Publications ==
- Book, How to Play the Ukulele, by Luvaun, London, Ascherberg, Hopwood & Crew, Ltd. (1926), [MT645.L9;]
- Sheet Music, Hawaiian Onestep, für Salonorchester, by Segis Luvaun, arr. von B. Bernards; für Pianoforte, arr. von Kurt Lubbe, Leipzig Publishing House, Germany, c 1919–1923.
- Sheet Music, Moana. Hawaiian Waltz, by Luvaun. Amsterdam Frederiksplein, Louis Noiret Music Publishing Company. 1922.
