= Andrew Poepoe =

American politician (born 1935)

Andrew K. Poepoe

Member of the Hawaii House of Representatives from the 25th district
- In office 1966–1978

Personal details
- Born: May 2, 1935 (age 91) Honolulu, Hawaii
- Party: Republican
- Spouse: Jaya Ramalu (m. 1958)
- Children: 2
- Education: Yale University
- Profession: Engineer

Andrew Keliikuniaupuni Poepoe (born May 2, 1935) is an American retired politician from the state of Hawaii.

Poepoe, the son of Reverend Abraham P. Poepoe, was born in Honolulu on May 2, 1935, and grew up in Kamuela, where his parents lived. After receiving primary education at Kamehameha Schools, he earned a bachelor's degree in industrial management from Yale University and a Master's of Business Administration (MBA) from the University of Hawaii. He was an industrial engineer by profession and worked for the Dole Food Company, Castle & Cook Terminals, and Hawaiian Plantatations. Poepoe married Jaya Lakshmi Ramalu in September 1958 and has two sons. He resided in Kailua.

Poepoe was elected to the Hawaii House of Representatives as a member of the Republican party in 1966, and served until 1978 for the district of Aikahi-Enchanted Lakes. During his term, he served in various leadership positions, including as minority whip and minority leader. He also served on the House Finance Committee. Poepoe also served on the Honolulu City Council from 1978 to 1982 where he was a member of the zoning committee. In the 2000s, Poepoe served as the Hawaii district director for the United States Small Business Administration.
