= Wood Valley Temple =

Buddhist temple in Hawaii, United States

Coordinates: 19.2676°N 155.4680°W

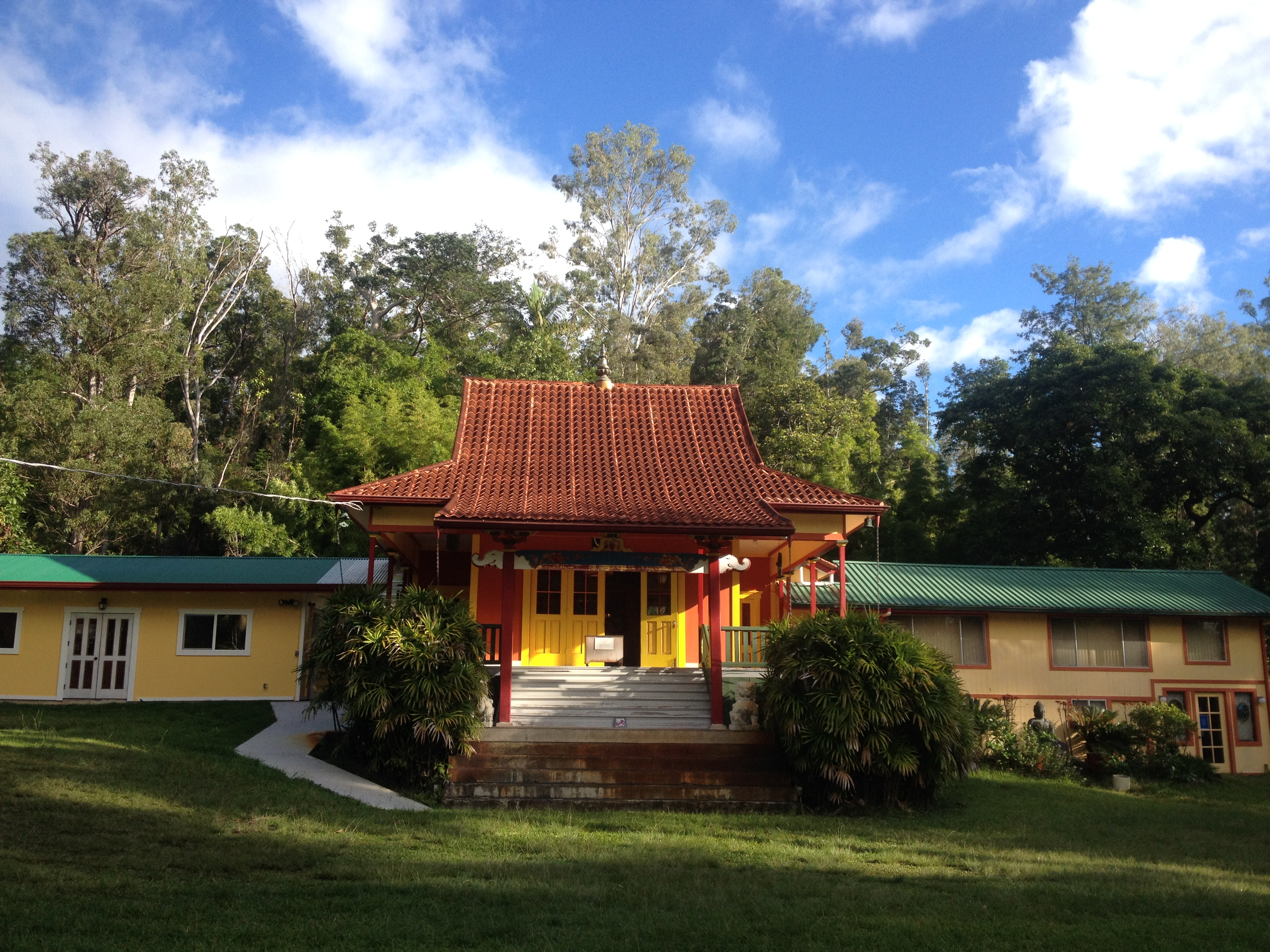
Wood Valley Temple near Pahala, Hawaii

Wood Valley Temple is a Tibetan Buddhist temple located five minutes above Pahala on the Big Island of Hawaii. Its Tibetan name is Nechung Dorje Drayang Ling (Tibetan: གནས་ཆུང་རྡོ་རྗེ་བྲག་གཡང་གླིང, Wylie: gnas-chung rdo-rje brag-g.yang gling).

== History ==
The temple was built in 1902 as a Nichiren Buddhist temple. Originally built closer to Pahala, the temple was moved in 1925 to its current location after a major flood in 1917 damaged the temple.

In the mid-1960s, the temple was abandoned after the Ka'u Sugar company ended their operations in the area. In 1973, the temple was leased to the Nechung lineage, a Nyingma lineage of Tibetan Buddhism associated with the Nechung Oracle, in order to start a center for Buddhist study and meditation on the island.
