= Pāhala, Hawaii =

Census-designated place in Hawaii, U.S.

Pāhala
- Census-designated place
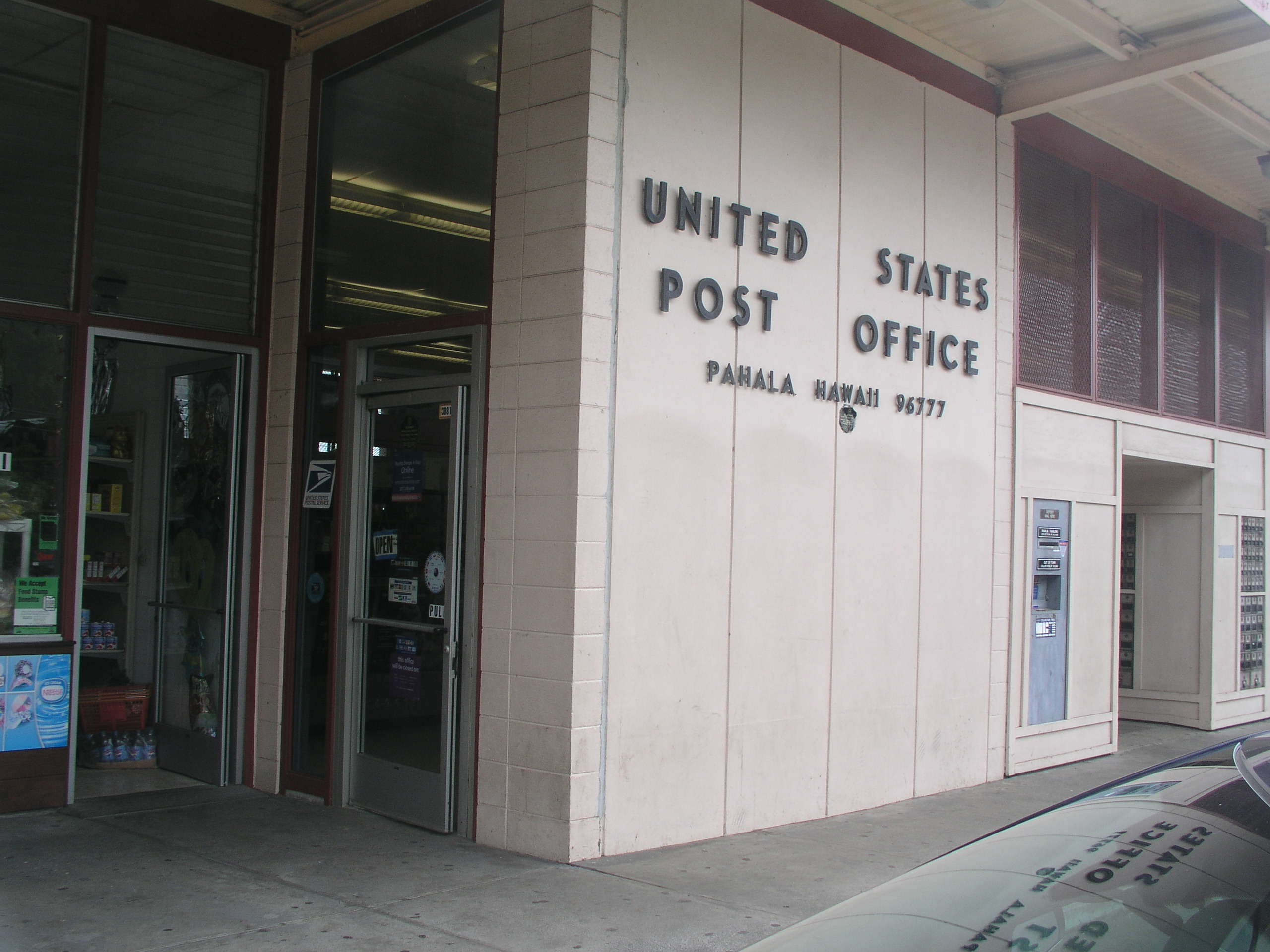
- U.S. post office in Pāhala, October 2008

- Location in Hawaii County and the state of Hawaii
- Coordinates: 19°12′9″N 155°28′38″W
- Country: United States
- State: Hawaii
- Counties: Hawaii

Area
  - Total: 0.64 sq mi (1.66 km^{2})
  - Land: 0.64 sq mi (1.66 km^{2})
  - Water: 0 sq mi (0.00 km^{2})
- Elevation: 920 ft (280 m)

Population (2020)
  - Total: 1,403
  - Density: 2,184.1/sq mi (843.28/km^{2})
- Time zone: UTC-10 (Hawaii–Aleutian)
- ZIP Code: 96777
- Area code: 808
- FIPS code: 15-59750
- GNIS feature ID: 362938

Pāhala is a census-designated place (CDP) in Hawaiʻi County, Hawaiʻi, United States. The population was 1,403 at the 2020 census.

== History ==
Pāhala was created by a sugarcane plantation. The area selected to house the sugar refinery had several key features:

- a flat plateau on a sloping mountainous region
- direct access to a water well
- a strategic central location to sugarcane fields

In Hawaiian, Pāhala refers to the ashes of leaves from the hala tree (Pandanus tectorius). Long ago, when cracks were found in the sugarcane fields, workers would stuff them with hala leaves and burn them.

For years, Pāhala consisted of a manager's house, several plantation homes, a general store, and the sugar refinery. Many of the sugarcane workers were housed in small camps in and around Pāhala and in camps situated throughout the outlying sugarcane fields. Many of these camps were self-sufficient. They consisted of eight to twelve plantation dwellings with a small store. Some camps had specialty shops such as a blacksmith or a simple barbershop. As time passed some installed gas stations.

In 1881, the first public school in the district of Kaʻu was established in Kapapala. The humble campus consisted of just two buildings. Some years later the school and its two buildings were relocated to Pāhala and called Pāhala High and Elementary School. In 1959, as Hawaiʻi Territory became the state of Hawaiʻi, the last class of the Pāhala High School held commencement ceremonies. The school then became Kaʻū High and Pāhala Elementary School. It is the second oldest public school in the state of Hawaiʻi, behind Lāhaināluna School in Lāhainā. Still in use today at Kaʻū High is Kapono Building, the oldest public school building west of the Rocky Mountains. The only other public school in the district of Kaʻū is Nāʻālehu Elementary. Nāʻālehu once had a high school. Today, students attend grades kindergarten through 6th grade in Nāʻālehu.

As time progressed, Pāhala became the focal town of the northeastern side of the district of Kaʻū; Nāʻālehu became the other focal town to the south of the district. Businesses from outer camps migrated to Pāhala to set up shop. With social and economic changes came the demands for convenience. Soon, more stores opened up. A bank and gas stations were built. For leisure, a town hall or "Club House" was built and used by the plantation and the community to hold meetings and parties. In the early 1940s Pāhala Theatre was built.

By the early 1960s, C. Brewer & Co. had decided to phase out all of the camps and move homes and other structures to Pāhala. At this time C. Brewer explored other alternatives to diversify into, eventually settling on macadamia nuts. Considered a weed in their native Australia, macadamia trees flourished into a new niche market for Hawaiʻi.

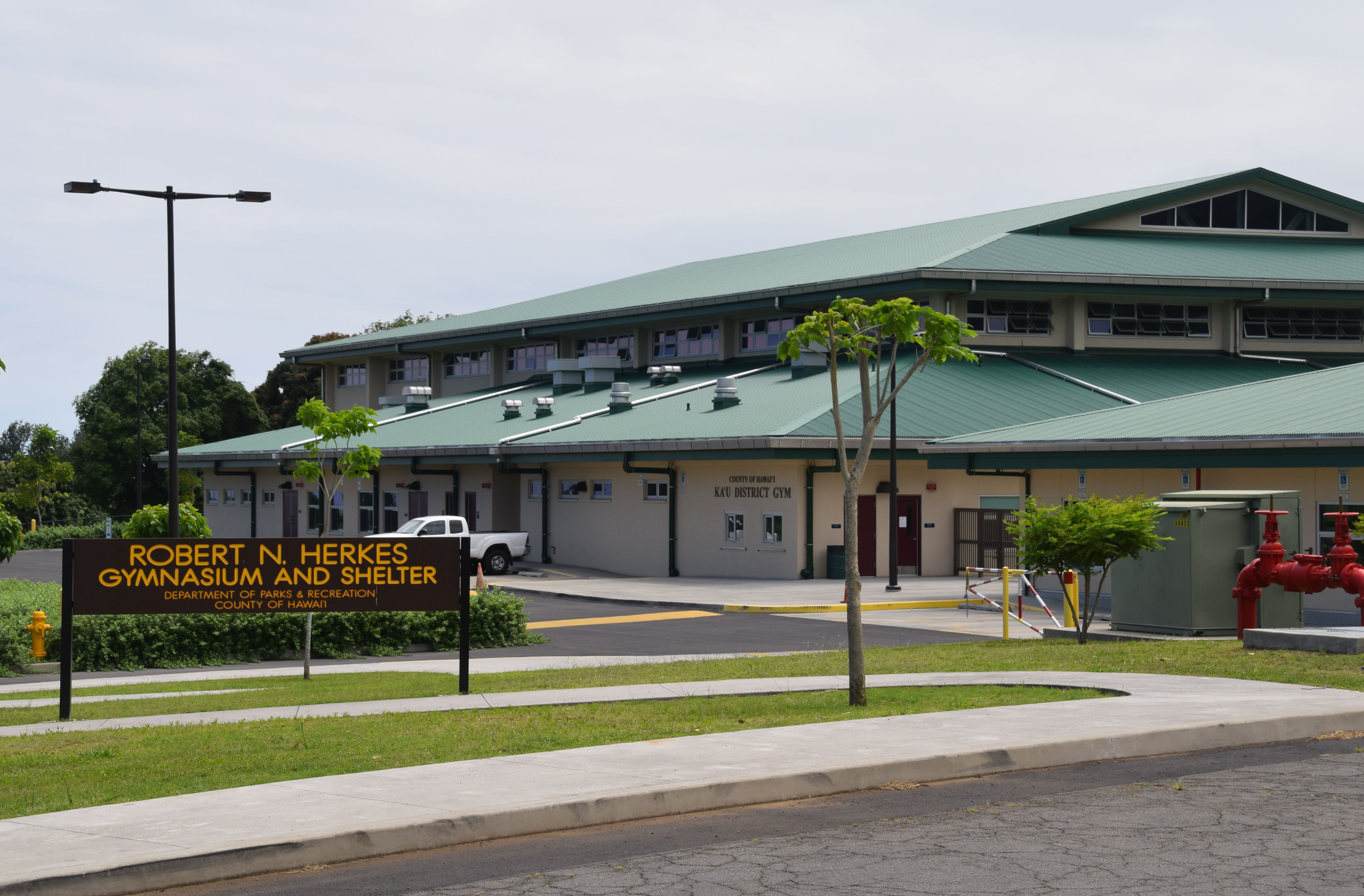
Kaʻū High and Pāhala Elementary School, April 2018

The early 1970s demonstrated how influential the world's economy can be to Pāhala. The 1970s brought about fuel shortages, and developing nations began to produce cheaper sugar. During the 1970s C. Brewer proposed the perfect opportunity to diversify. A gentleman by the name of Bob Shleser had proposed to Doc Buyers (then CEO of C. Brewer) the idea and technology to convert the Pāhala Sugar Mill to produce ethanol fuel from sugarcane. Shleser also proposed that Hawaiʻi County pass a bill that would require 25% of all vehicles on the island to be retrofitted to use ethanol by 1985. Doc Buyers, however, decided against it.

By the late 1970s, with sugar's looming demise, C. Brewer instead decided to expand its macadamia nut operations. They began to phase out sugarcane fields that encircled Pāhala, converting them to grow macadamia trees.

By the mid 1980s it was apparent that sugar had seen its heyday. Honuʻapo's mill had closed in 1972 and its workers transferred to Pāhala. But other sugarcane plantations around the island began to close as well. Still, the Pāhala Sugar Mill continued to produce record tons per acre, but at a steep price. At the time it cost $1.50 to produce 1 lb (0.45 kg), which would then sell for $0.60. Congress had proposed bills that placed huge tariffs and taxes on imported sugar. But economically, even those measures could not stave off the inevitable.

In the 1990s, it was all too evident that sugarcane had lost its lustre. C. Brewers' investors were getting older and demanded Doc Buyers cut their losses and liquidate. In 1994, Buyers made a last-ditch effort to keep the mill running. But it required all workers to take drastic pay cuts; most would have had to accept minimum wage. The workers refused. That sealed the fate of the sugar legacy in Pāhala. The last sugarcane was hauled and processed at the mill. Over the next two years the mill was dismantled and sold as parts to other manufacturing plants around the world. The sugarcane plantation and mill shut down in April 1996.

Many who lived and worked in Pāhala moved on to other jobs around the island. Some took jobs in the hotel industry. Some commute up to five hours a day to and from jobs at resorts along the Kohala coast. Some moved to Maui and Kauaʻi and worked at sugarcane plantations there. Others moved to the mainland to try a fresh start. Many old timers that have generations of family ties to Pāhala had passed on. Many in the younger generation have chosen not to return.

Still, there are those that have found their roots and figured out a way to remain in Pāhala. In fact, unlike many other places where the larger plantation homes were purchased by outsiders coming to live in Hawaiʻi, the manager homes in Pāhala were mostly purchased by local people who have stepped up to the new economy and have such jobs as doctor, bakery manager, fisherman, policeman, painting contractor and other jobs important to the community. Some new people have also moved in, restored the historic homes and established their roots, and now call Pāhala home.

There has also been a movement to preserve the shoreline near Pāhala, called the Kaʻū Coast, which is the longest uninhabited coast in Hawaiʻi. Its 80 miles (130 km) now include 235 acres (95 ha) of oceanfront park, for which the community raised more than $4 million to purchase and set aside forever. Another 750 acres (300 ha) along the coast called Kawa is likely to be preserved. Inland, more than 115,000 acres (470 km^{2}) have been added to Hawaiʻi Volcanoes National Park, which now circles Pāhala in the mountains above the village.

== Geography ==
Pāhala is located in the southern part of the island of Hawaiʻi at 19°12′15″N 155°28′44″W. Hawaii Route 11 forms the southeast border of the community. The highway leads northeast 52 miles (84 km) to Hilo and southwest 12 miles (19 km) to Nāʻālehu. The main entrance to Hawaiʻi Volcanoes National Park is 23 miles (37 km) to the northeast of Pāhala on Route 11.

According to the United States Census Bureau, the CDP has a total area of 0.85 square miles (2.2 km^{2}), all of it land.

== Climate ==
Pāhala has a dry-summer tropical savanna climate (As) with hot daytime temperatures and mild nighttime temperatures year round and a summer dry season. Precipitation peaks during the month of November.

On April 27, 1931, the temperature reached 100 °F (37.8 °C) in Pāhala, which is the highest temperature recorded in Hawaii.

Climate data for Pahala
Month	Jan	Feb	Mar	Apr	May	Jun	Jul	Aug	Sep	Oct	Nov	Dec	Year
Record high °F (°C)	93 (34)	90 (32)	93 (34)	100 (38)	93 (34)	89 (32)	92 (33)	92 (33)	90 (32)	90 (32)	90 (32)	91 (33)	100 (38)
Mean daily maximum °F (°C)	78 (26)	78 (26)	78 (26)	78 (26)	79 (26)	80 (27)	81 (27)	82 (28)	82 (28)	81 (27)	80 (27)	78 (26)	80 (27)
Mean daily minimum °F (°C)	63 (17)	62 (17)	63 (17)	64 (18)	65 (18)	67 (19)	67 (19)	68 (20)	68 (20)	67 (19)	66 (19)	67 (19)	66 (19)
Record low °F (°C)	50 (10)	52 (11)	50 (10)	50 (10)	51 (11)	54 (12)	52 (11)	59 (15)	56 (13)	58 (14)	55 (13)	48 (9)	48 (9)
Average precipitation inches (mm)	5.37 (136)	4.22 (107)	4.11 (104)	3.19 (81)	2.38 (60)	1.87 (47)	3.57 (91)	3.28 (83)	4.04 (103)	4.67 (119)	6.53 (166)	5.64 (143)	48.87 (1,240)
Average precipitation days	12	11	13	12	10	7	7	8	9	11	11	11	122

== Economy ==
A former sugar plantation town, Pāhala is the district hub for education and health services, including a pharmacy, hospital, clinic, preschool and public school as well as a library.

There is a Catholic, an Assembly of God, and a Baptist church, as well as a Buddhist Hoangwanji and a Tibetan Buddhist temple up the mountain in Wood Valley.

The Kaʻū District's regional newspaper – the Kaʻū Calendar – with offices in Pāhala, is online daily and printed monthly.

Pāhala hosts the annual Kaʻū Coffee Festival and Kaʻū Coffee Trail Run, Science Camps of America for teenagers each summer, and many family reunions and weddings, as well as NGO, company, music and dance retreats.

== Demographics ==
Historical population
Census	Pop.	Note	%±
2020	1,403		—
U.S. Decennial Census

As of the census of 2000, there were 1,378 people, 443 households, and 334 families residing in the CDP. The population density was 1,635.9 inhabitants per square mile (631.6/km^{2}). There were 487 housing units at an average density of 578.1 per square mile (223.2/km^{2}). The racial makeup of the CDP was 8.78% White, 0.07% Native American, 47.68% Asian, 10.45% Pacific Islander, 0.51% from other races, and 32.51% from two or more races. Hispanic or Latino of any race were 6.31% of the population.

There were 443 households, out of which 33.4% had children under the age of 18 living with them, 55.5% were married couples living together, 12.0% had a female householder with no husband present, and 24.6% were non-families. 21.2% of all households were made up of individuals, and 12.2% had someone living alone who was 65 years of age or older. The average household size was 3.08 and the average family size was 3.51.

In the CDP the population was spread out, with 27.3% under the age of 18, 9.5% from 18 to 24, 21.0% from 25 to 44, 23.3% from 45 to 64, and 18.9% who were 65 years of age or older. The median age was 40 years. For every 100 females, there were 100.0 males. For every 100 females age 18 and over, there were 97.6 males.

The median income for a household in the CDP was $30,243, and the median income for a family was $31,548. Males had a median income of $25,375 versus $21,023 for females. The per capita income for the CDP was $11,450. About 17.9% of families and 24.2% of the population were below the poverty line, including 32.8% of those under age 18 and 12.8% of those age 65 or over.

== Education ==
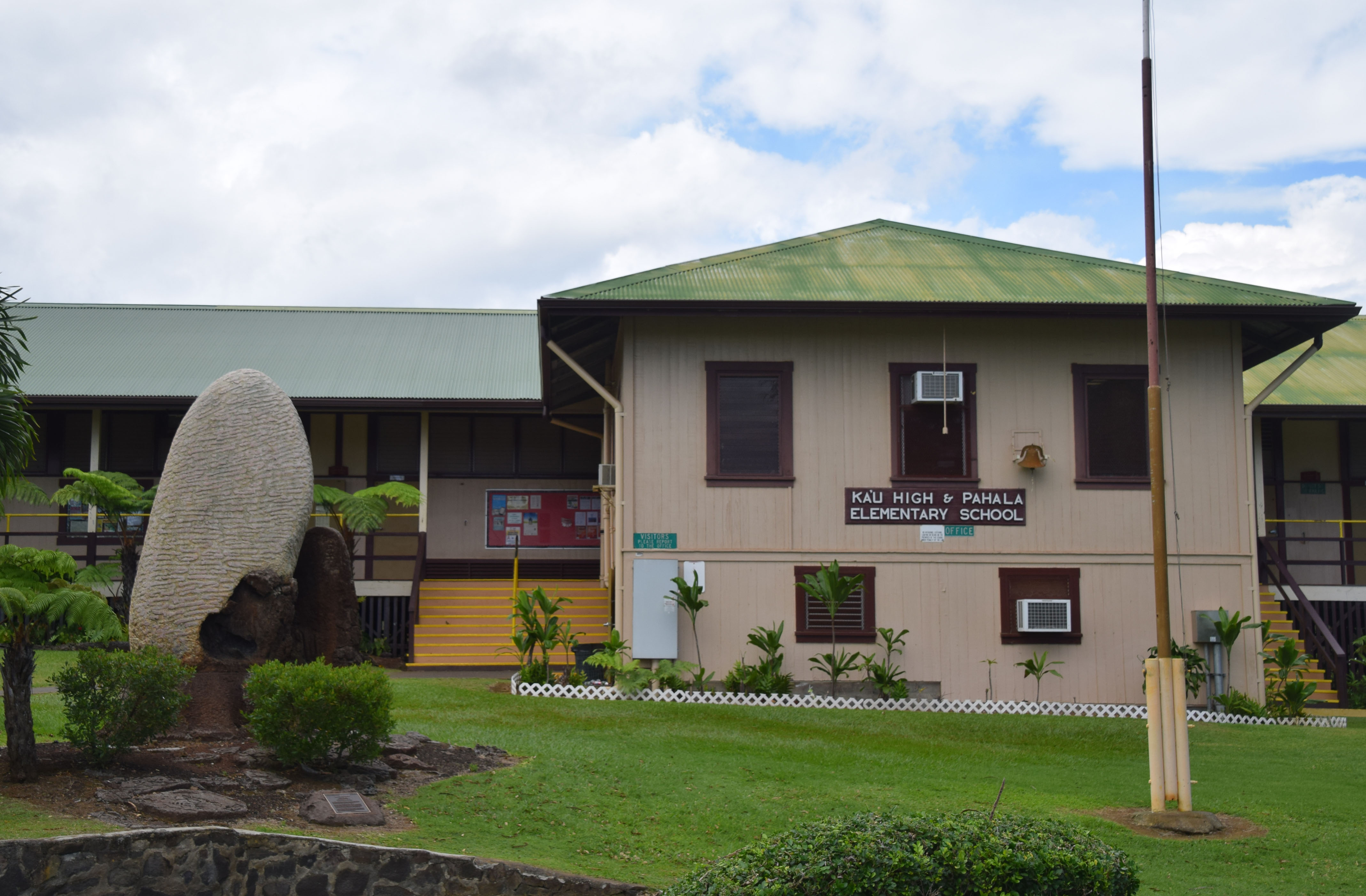
Kaʻū High and Pāhala Elementary School, April 2018

The statewide school district is the Hawaii State Department of Education, and it covers Hawaii County. The community has Kau High and Pāhala Elementary School.

The Hawaii State Public Library System operates Pāhala Public and School Library.

== See also ==
- List of census-designated places in Hawaiʻi
- Hawaiʻi Volcanoes Wilderness
- Wood Valley Temple
