= Waipa Foundation =

Organization in Lihue, Hawaiʻi, United States

Waipā Foundation
- Formation: 1993; 32 years ago
- Type: Nonprofit
- Tax ID no.: 99-0313224
- Legal status: 501(c)(3)
- Headquarters: Hanalei, Kaua’i, Hawai’i
- Board President: Mr. Wallace Rezentes Jr.
- Executive Director: Stacy M. Sporat
- Website: https://waipafoundation.org/

The Waipā Foundation is a non-profit organization which sponsors a program called ʻAina Ulu (in the Hawaiian language), funded by Kamehameha Schools.

Its programs grew out of community efforts to manage the ahupuaʻa of Waipa in the late 1980s. The Waipā Foundation was established as a 501(c)3 non-profit in 1993.

== The program ==
The foundation makes its home in the ahupuaʻa of Waipā, a valley on the north shore of the island of Kauaʻi in Hawaii, 22°12′4″N 159°31′0″W. The Waipa stream flows through the valley and empties into Hanalei Bay. An ahupuaʻa is an ancient Hawaiian land division from mountains to the sea, often corresponding to a watershed district. It was used in traditional Hawaiian times as a way to distribute the resources of the land to the people. The mission of the foundation is "the physical and cultural restoration of the ahupuaʻa of Waipa".

== Ecological restoration ==
The restoration project at Waipā focuses on human interactions with plants and land. There are three types of sites. The first is native reforestation. Some of the plants being out planted are Acacia koa (Koa), Dodonaea viscosa (Aʻaliʻi), Munroidendron racemosum, Pritchardia spp. (Loulu), and Microlepia strigosa (Palapalai). Some sites feature Polynesian introduction plants, such as Piper methysticum (Kawa) and Cordyline fruticosa (Ti). These plants all have value in Hawaiian ethnobiology. The last designation of restoration sites is agroforestry. Waipa is planting fruit and timber trees to satisfy this category. All of the agroforestry plantings are plants with commercial value. They can be harvested and sold as well as provide food and medicine. By planting the trees, Waipa community is rehabilitating the land as well as providing for the community.
