= Hanalei =

Hanalei means "lei making" or "crescent bay" in Hawaiian. It may refer to:

== Features on Kauaʻi ==
- Hanalei, Hawaii, a village (census-designated place)
- Hanalei River
- Hanalei Bay
- Hanalei National Wildlife Refuge
- Hanalei Pier, on the National Register of Historic Places

== Other uses ==
- Hanalei (band), an American indie rock band
