= Kauai National Wildlife Refuge Complex =

Coordinates: 22.22772°N 159.40138°W

Kauaʻi National Wildlife Refuge Complex is a National Wildlife Refuge complex in the state of Hawaii, US.

== Refuges within the complex ==
- Hanalei National Wildlife Refuge
- Huleia National Wildlife Refuge
- Kilauea Point National Wildlife Refuge
