= Hawaii Route 560 =

State highway on Kauaʻi, Hawaii, US

Hawaii Route 560
- Kauaʻi Belt Road–North Shore section
- Route 560 highlighted in red

Route information
- Maintained by HDOT
- Length: 10.01 mi (16.11 km)
- Existed: Late 1960s–present
- History: 2004: Added to the NRHP

Major junctions
- East end: Route 56 in Princeville
- West end: Dead ends at Ha'ena State Park

Location
- Country: United States
- State: Hawaii
- Counties: Kauaʻi

Highway system
- Routes in Hawaii
← Route 550	→ Route 570
- Kaua'i Belt Road--North Shore section
- U.S. National Register of Historic Places
- U.S. Historic district
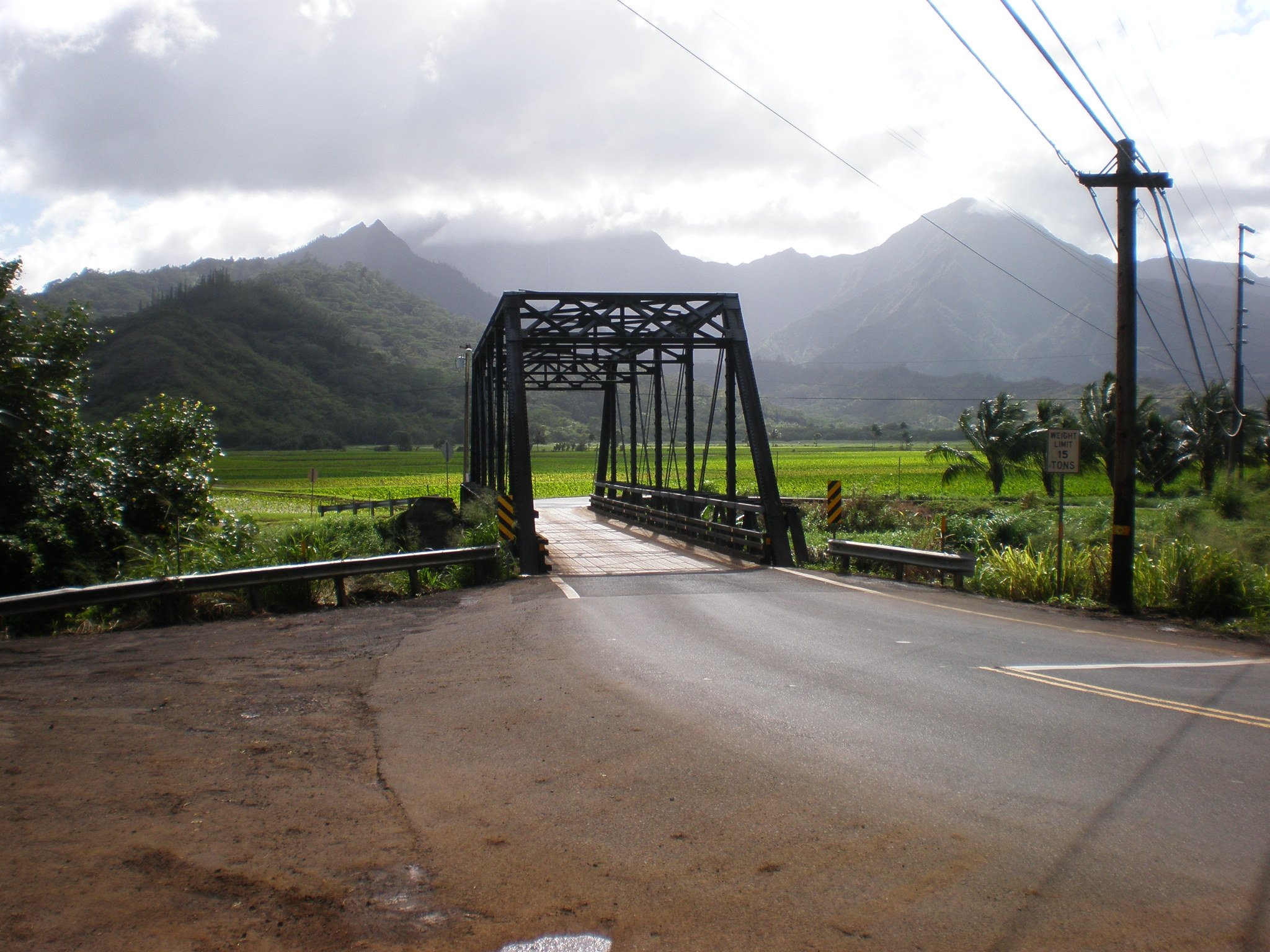
- Bridge over Hanalei River, November 2009

- Location within Hawaii
- Location: Route 560; Princeville, Hawaii; United States
- Coordinates: 22°12′43″N 159°31′40″W
- Built: 1900
- Architect: J.H. Moragne, R.L. Garlinghouse, et al.
- NRHP reference No.: 03001048
- Added to NRHP: February 11, 2004

Route 560, or Kauaʻi Belt Road–North Shore section, is a ten-mile (16 km) scenic road on the northern shore of the island of Kauaʻi in Hawaii. The entire road is signed as the Kuhio Highway. Hawaii Route 56 was once signed on this route before it was downgraded to Hawaii Route 560 in the late 1960s. The Kuhio Highway is named after Jonah Kūhiō Kalaniana'ole, the second non-voting congressional delegate from territorial Hawaii.

== Route description ==
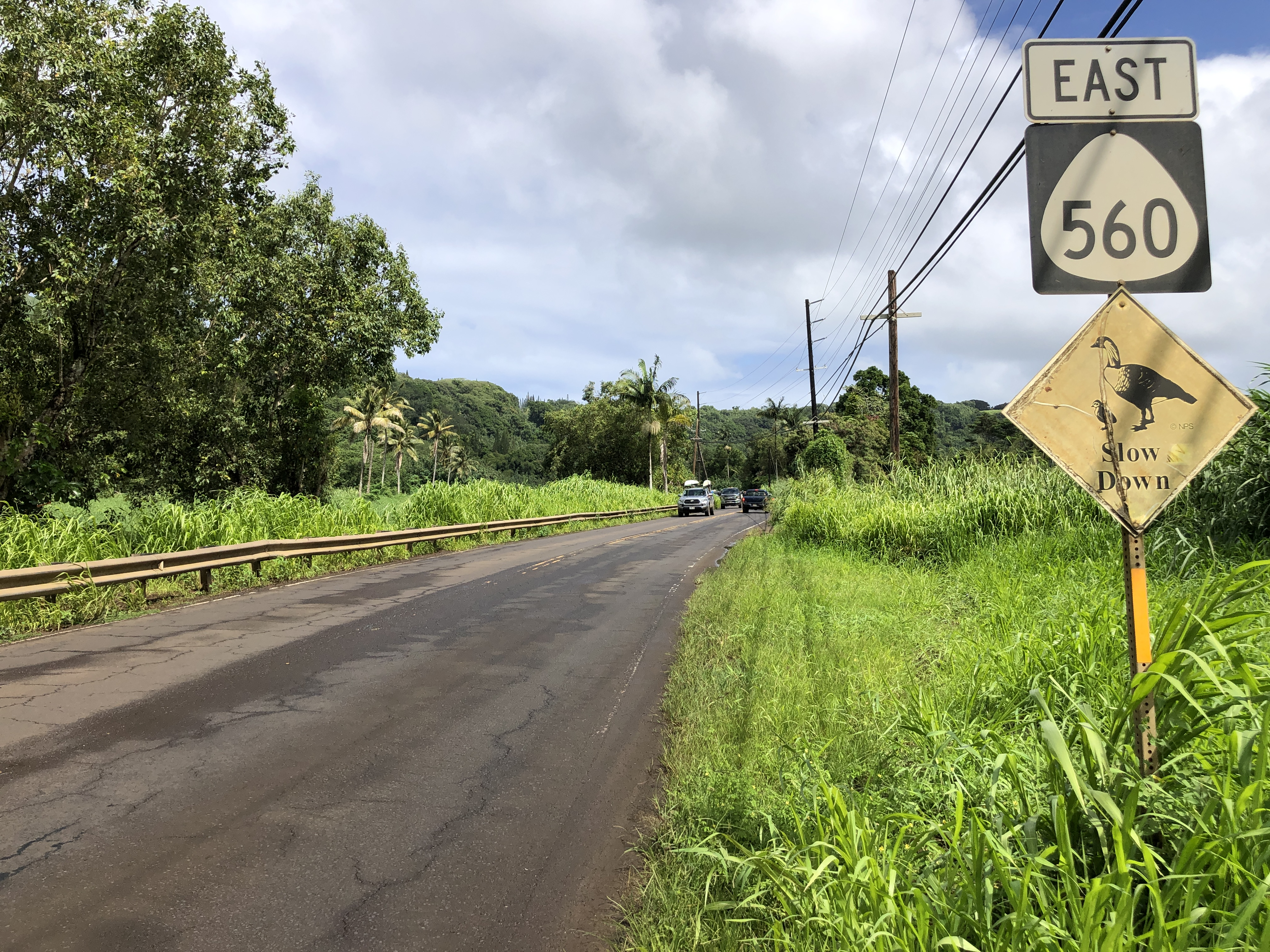
Route 560 eastbound between Hanalei and Princeville

Kuhio Highway ends its Route 56 designation in Princeville. The road drops in elevation heading toward the Hanalei River with lookout points giving views of the river valley and the northwestern shore of Kauaʻi. It then goes through the only major town on this route, Hanalei, and past Hanalei Bay. It follows a foot trail used by ancient Hawaiians. An early record is given in the 1849 diary of William DeWitt Alexander, who lived at the Waiʻoli mission, which is still along the road. William Tufts Brigham recorded boats used to cross the rivers in 1865. The Hanalei Pier is just north of the road, on the bay. At one time the valley was home to rice fields, and the Haraguchi Rice Mill is one of several along the river.

The road is narrow at times and features 11 one-lane bridges, with the first five constructed in 1912. County engineers J. H. Moragne and R. L. Garlinghouse supervised building and paving the bridges.

Many of these bridges have restricted weight limits and some are wooden. Traffic must yield at these bridges and it is customary to allow the greater traffic to cross first, or after five to seven cars have passed, to allow to the other side to pass. The road becomes narrower with each passing mile as the Nā Pali Coast begins to inch closer to the coast. The road dead-ends at Haʻena State Park.

== History ==
In the 1960s, there were plans to extend the road to Route 550, allowing one to circumnavigate the entire island, but they were dropped due to environmental concerns and lack of traffic demand. The Hawaii Department of Transportation was planning to replace the bridges with two-lane bridges, but the plan was abandoned in 1987. The area is popular for films, but they can cause traffic congestion since there are no alternate routes.

Instead, a massive renovation project began for the Hanalei River bridge, promoted by a community preservation group with the Hawaii Department of Transportation. A Pratt truss was built as a replica of the original 1912 one-lane structure. The new bridge was officially dedicated in 2003. A 1960s structure under the roadway supports the heavier weight of modern traffic. On February 11, 2004, Route 560 was added to the National Register of Historic Places listings in Hawaii as site 03001048.

== Major intersections ==
The entire route is in Kauaʻi County.

Location	mi	km	Destinations	Notes
Princeville	0.00	0.00	Route 56	Eastern terminus of Route 560
	10.01	16.11	Hāʻena State Park	Western terminus of Route 560
1.000 mi = 1.609 km; 1.000 km = 0.621 mi

== See also ==
- Cultural landscape
- State Historic Preservation Office
