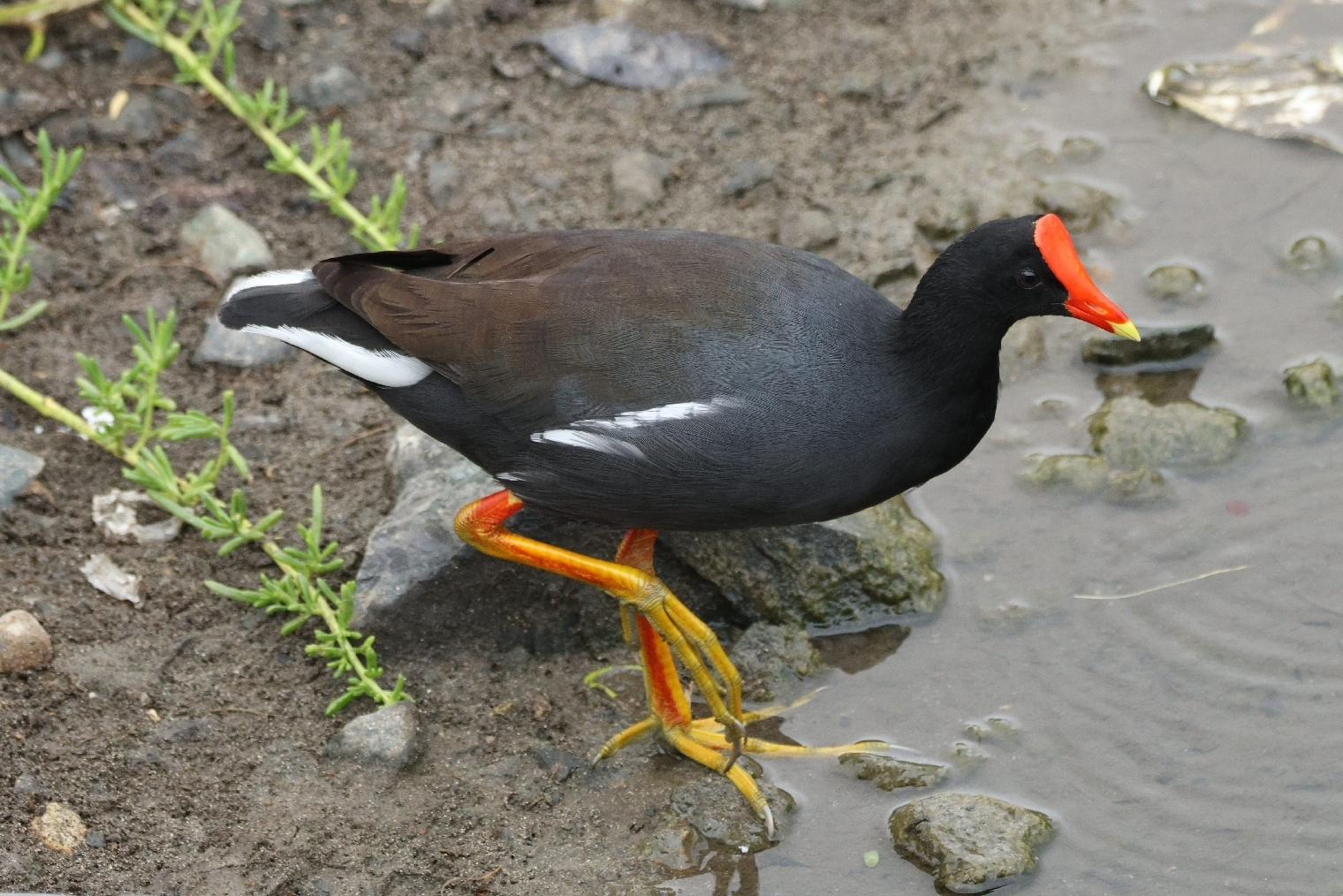

Conservation status
- Imperiled (NatureServe)

Scientific classification
- Kingdom: Animalia
- Phylum: Chordata
- Class: Aves
- Order: Gruiformes
- Family: Rallidae
- Genus: Gallinula
- Species: G. galeata
- Subspecies: G. g. sandvicensis

Trinomial name
- Gallinula galeata sandvicensis Streets, 1877

Synonyms
- Gallinula sandvicensis Streets, 1877; Gallinula galeata sandwichensis Stejneger,1882; Gallinula chloropus sandvicensis Mathews, 1927

= Hawaiian gallinule =

Subspecies of bird

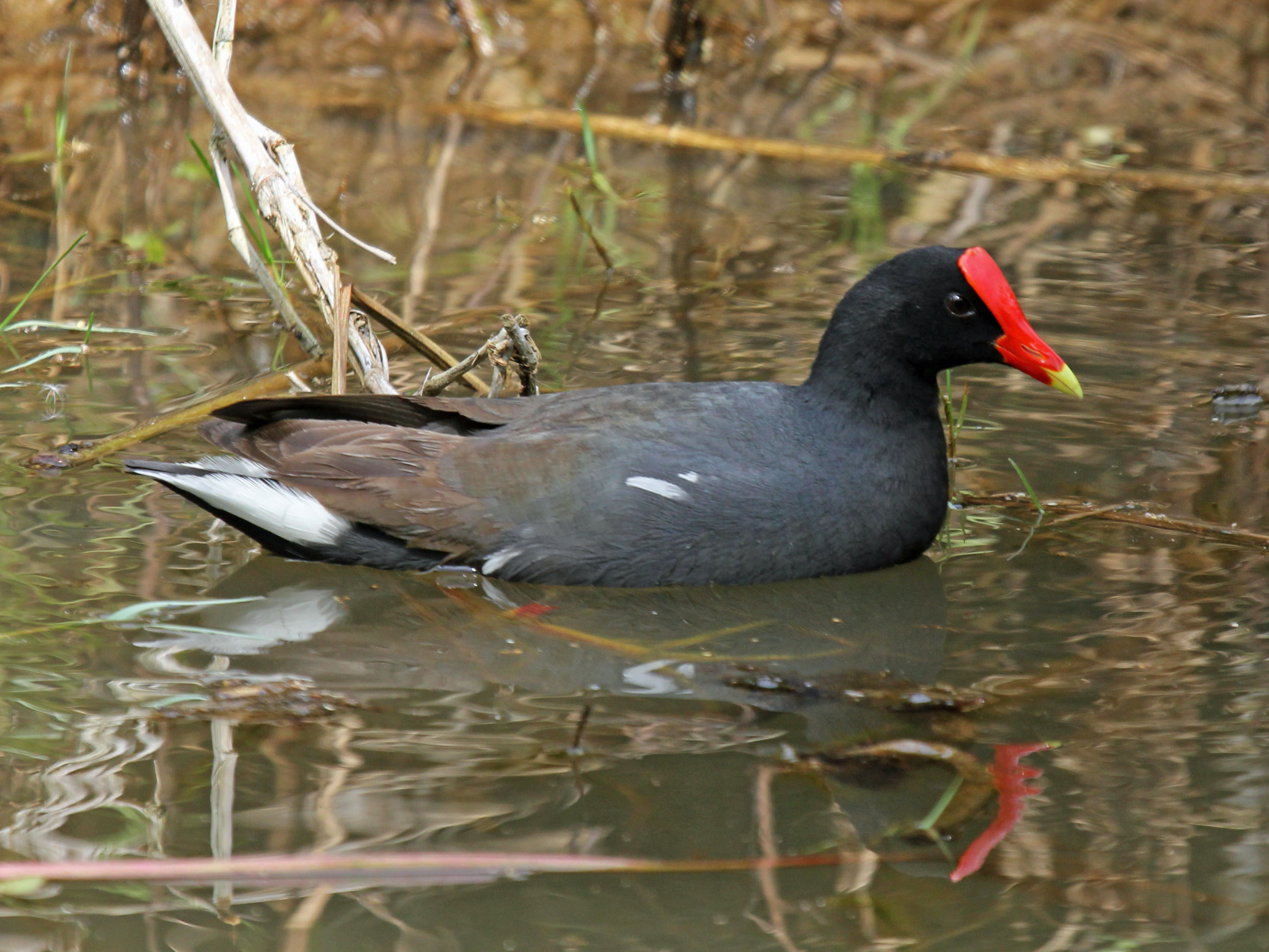
Showing plumage details

The Hawaiian gallinule (Gallinula galeata sandvicensis) is an endangered subspecies of the common gallinule that is endemic to the tropical Hawaiian Islands. It is also variously known as the Hawaiian common gallinule, Hawaiian moorhen, Hawaiian common moorhen, mudhen, or ʻalae ʻula ('burnt forehead' - for its prominent red frontal shield) in Hawaiian, and sometimes misleadingly as the Hawaiian red coot.

It is dependent on freshwater wetland habitats with dense emergent vegetation for nesting. Once found on most of the main islands of the Hawaiian archipelago, it has undergone a major population and range decline and is now a resident breeder only on Kauaʻi and Oʻahu. Causes of the decline were mainly loss of habitat, hunting and predation by introduced animals, with numbers subsequently stabilised at a low level through legal protection and conservation management. Despite being hunted for food, it was mythologised as the keeper of fire in Hawaiian religion.

== Taxonomy ==
It is likely that the Hawaiian gallinule is descended from stray migrant common gallinules from North America. It was formerly treated as a subspecies of the common moorhen, and subsequently as a subspecies of the common gallinule when that species was split from the common moorhen in 2011. It is distinguished from other subspecies by a larger frontal shield and a red blush on the front and sides of the tibiotarsus.

== Description ==
The Hawaiian gallinule has dark grey-brown upperparts, black head and neck, dark slate-blue underparts, with mostly white undertail coverts and white flank stripes. It has a large red frontal shield over a red, yellow-tipped, bill. The long, sturdy legs and long-toed feet are mainly yellowish-green. Sexes are similar. The body length of the gallinule is about 33 cm. The average body mass of adult birds is 350 g. Immature birds are olive- to greyish-brown, with duller pale yellow to brown bills.

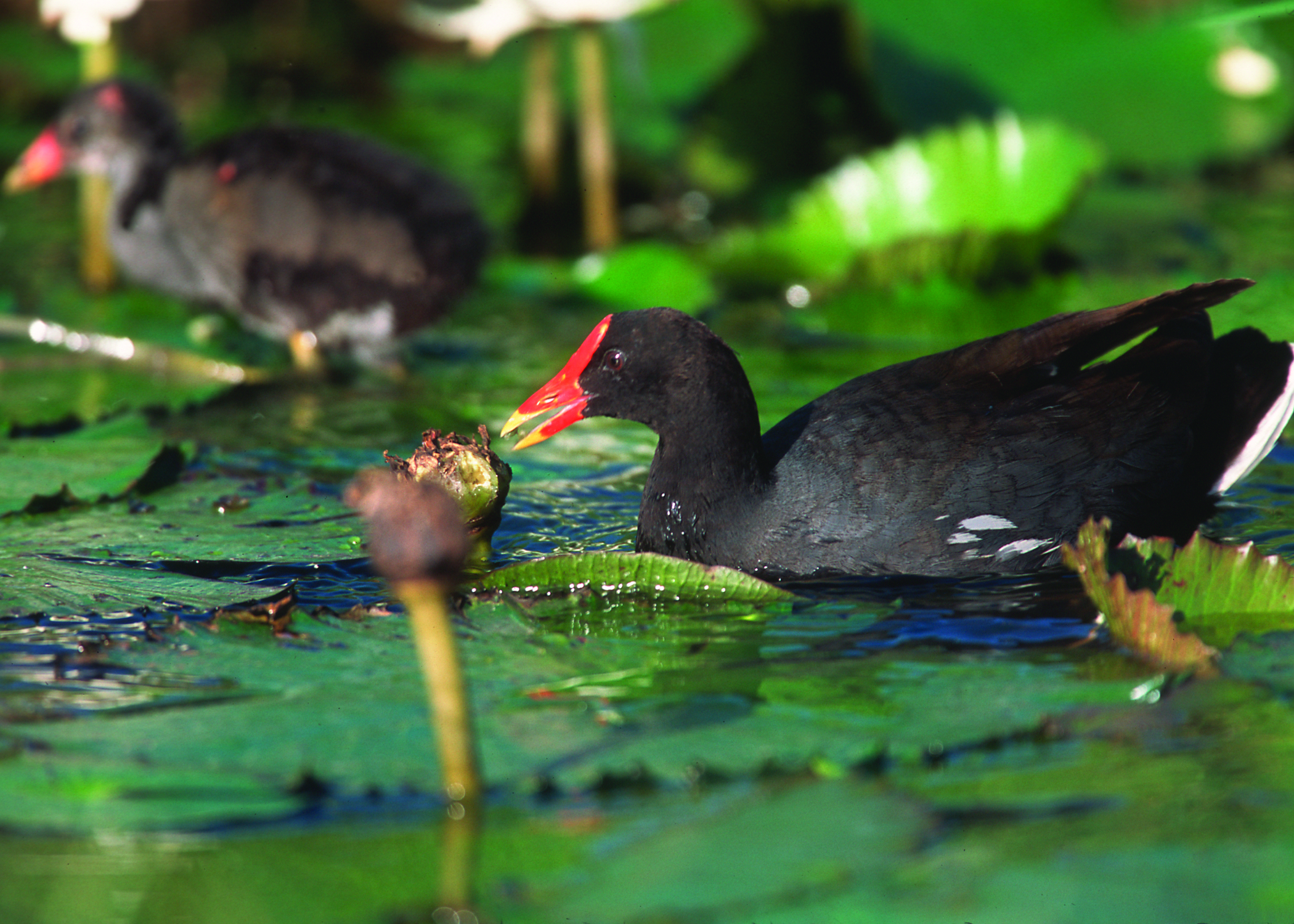
In Hawaii

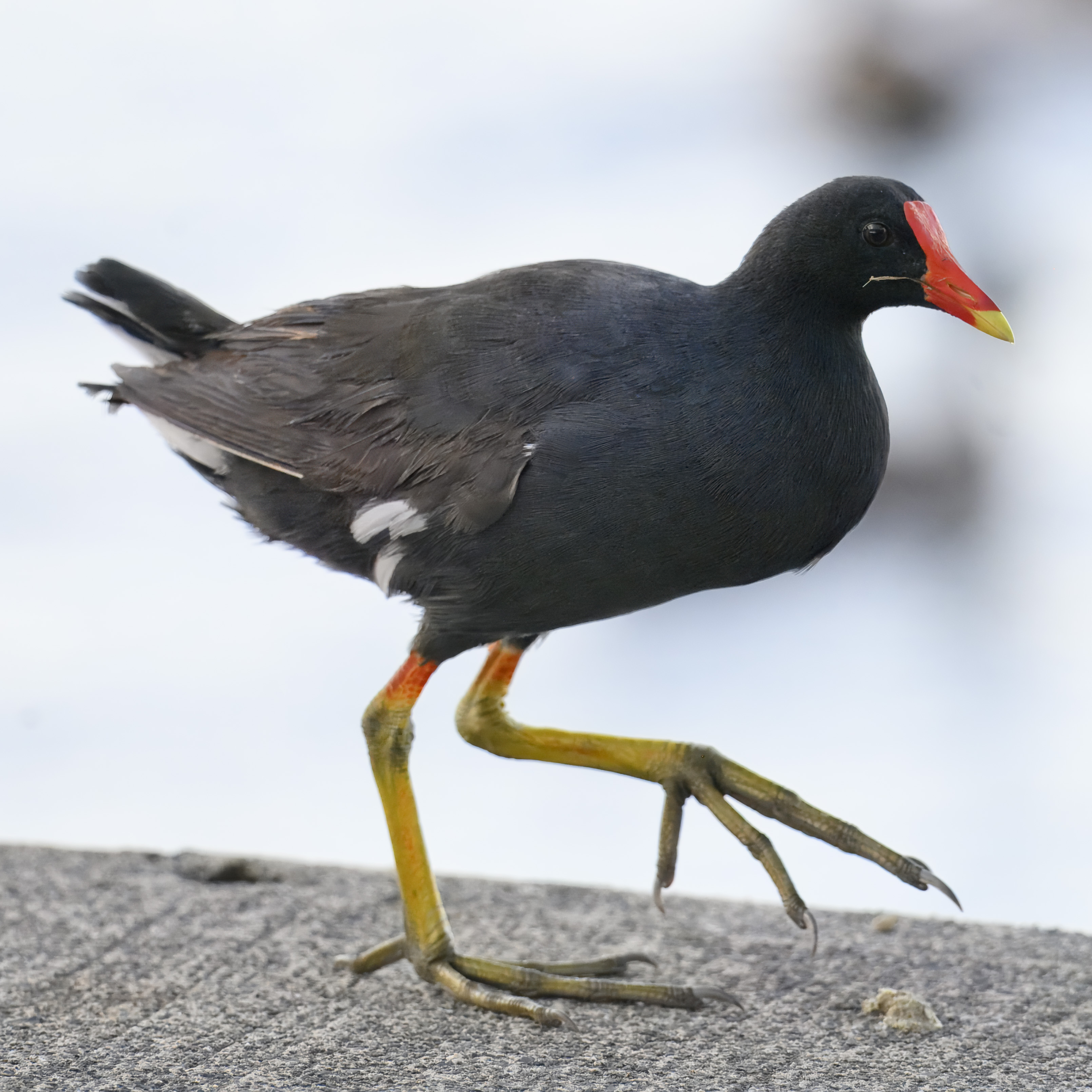
The feet are not webbed; in O'ahu.

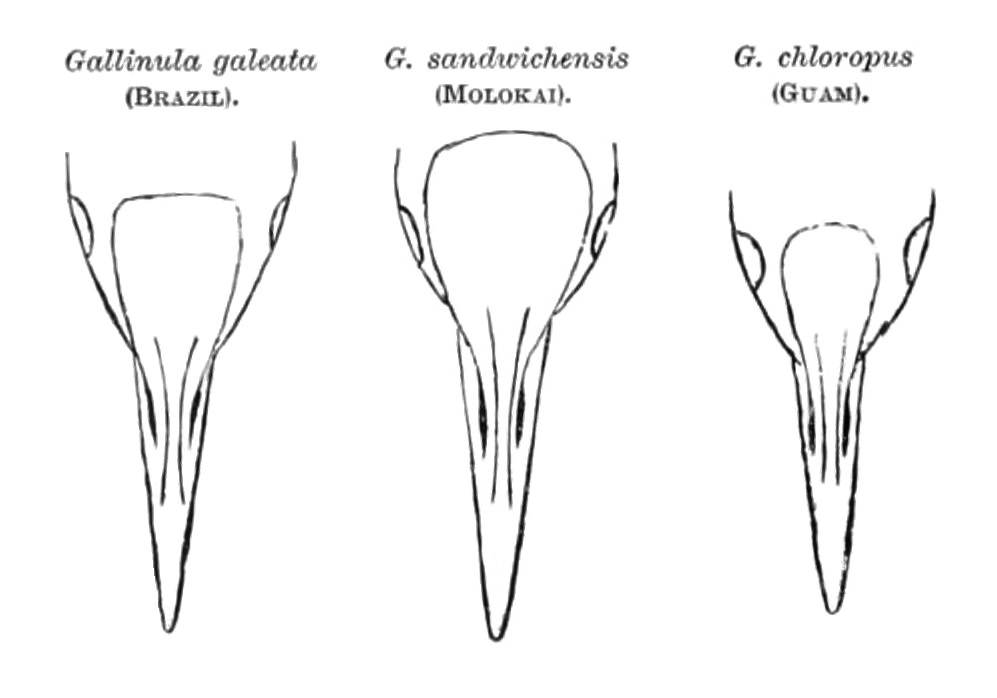
Gallinula crowns and bills showing larger frontal shield on the Hawaiian gallinule (centre) compared with the nominate G. g. galeata (left) and a Common Moorhen from Guam (right)

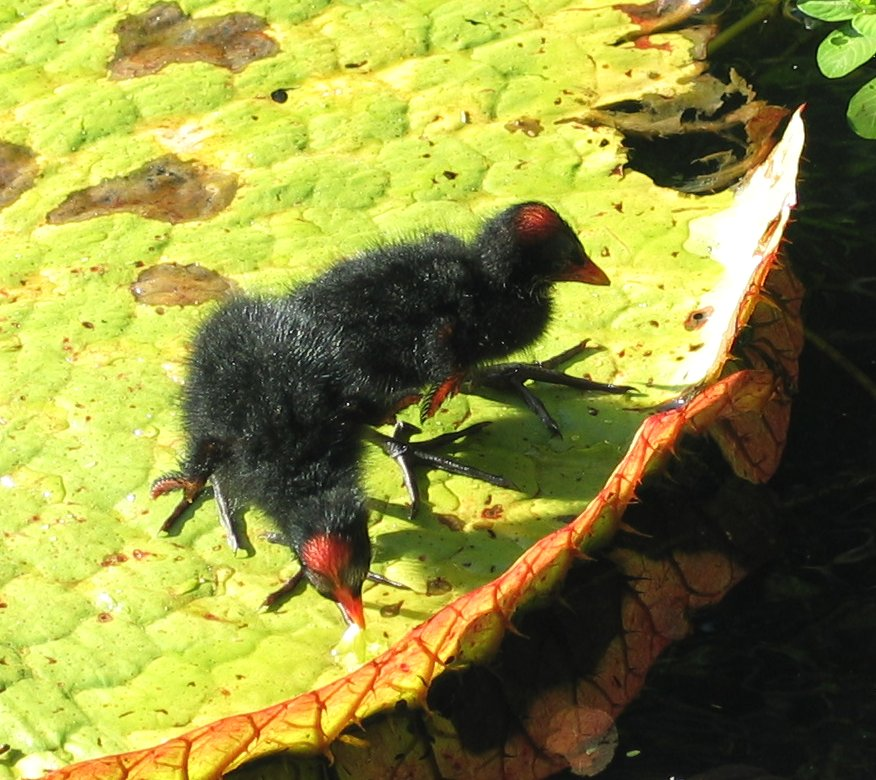
Chicks on the leaf of a giant water lily

=== Identification ===
The gallinule is easily distinguished from the only similar bird in its range, the Hawaiian coot, by the latter's white frontal shield. Its vocalisations have been described as “chicken-like cackling calls and croaks which are louder and higher pitched than the coot's”.

== Behaviour ==
The gallinules are secretive birds, spending much time in dense wetland vegetation. While feeding in the open they will quickly seek cover when disturbed. At some locations, however, individuals are quite tame and will even approach humans. Despite the lack of webbing or lobes on their toes, the birds are good swimmers. They moult over a period of about 25 days each year, normally between June and September, when they are unable to fly and so more vulnerable to predation.

=== Breeding ===
Breeding may occur throughout the year, peaking from March to August; it is affected by water levels and vegetation growth. Nesting pairs are territorial, with territory size measured at 850–2400 m^{2}. Nests are generally sited inconspicuously within dense vegetation above shallow, standing, fresh water not more than 60 cm deep. The nests are constructed on platforms of flattened or folded vegetation close to the water surface, with flooding being a major cause of nesting failure. Nests are about 26 cm across, with an inside diameter of 16 cm and a depth of 5 cm. Average egg size is 44.1 mm x 31.5 mm. Clutch size is usually five or six, with an incubation period of 19–22 days. When the chicks hatch, the adults eat or remove the eggshells from the vicinity of the nest site. The chicks are precocial, and are able to walk and swim soon after hatching, but depend on their parents for protection and feeding for some 21–25 days, after which they begin to feed independently.

=== Feeding ===
The birds forage in and near dense wetland vegetation. They are opportunistic feeders, consuming a variety of plant material (such as algae, grass and seeds) and invertebrates (including molluscs and aquatic insects).

== Distribution and habitat ==
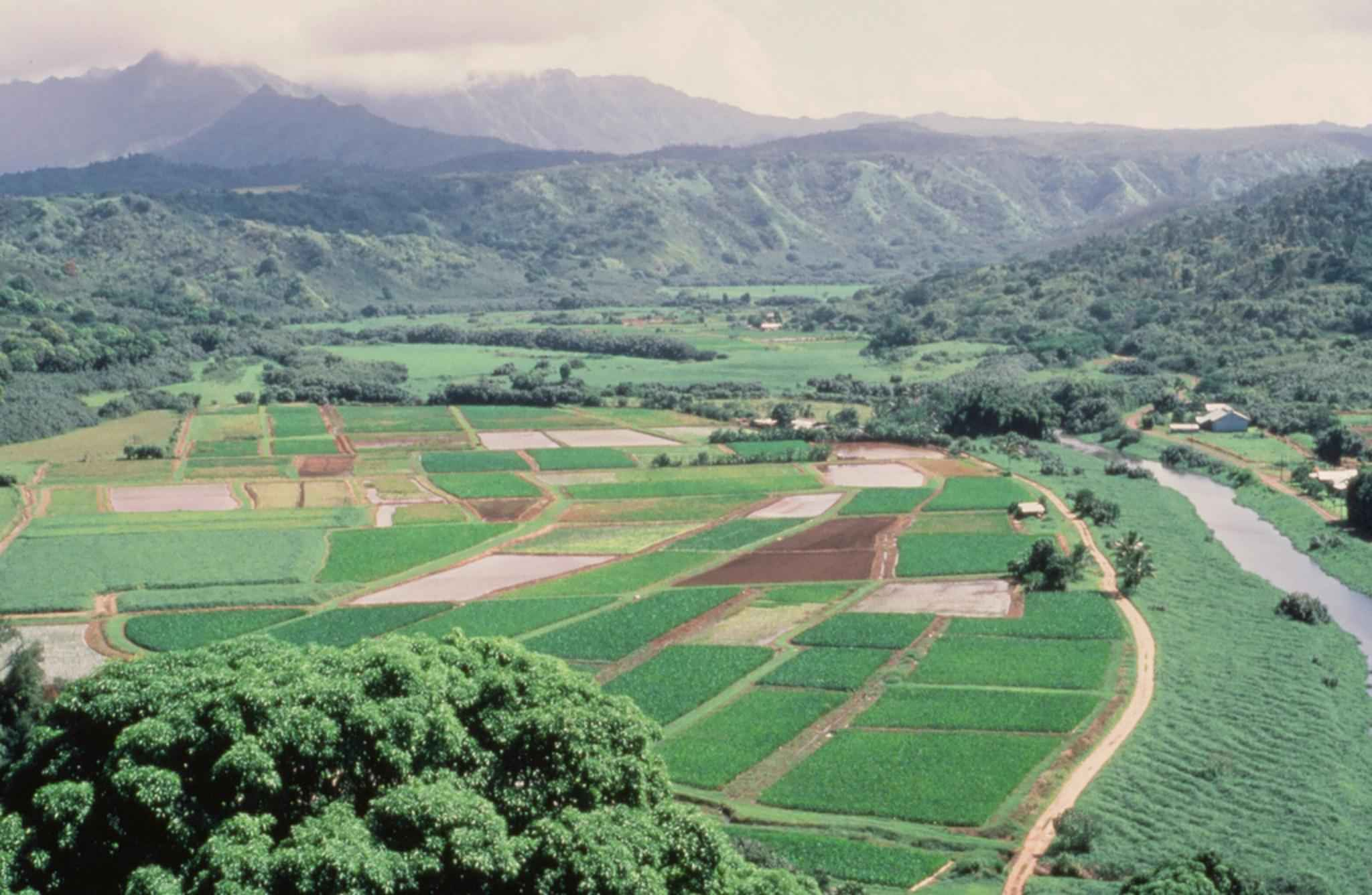
View of the Hanalei Valley in Kauaʻi, a stronghold of the Hawaiian gallinule; Hanalei National Wildlife Refuge in the background, taro fields in the foreground

The gallinule used to occur on all the main Hawaiian Islands except Lānaʻi and Kahoʻolawe, though it is now resident only on Kauaʻi and Oʻahu, with each island holding roughly half of the remaining population. The population on Kauaʻi (which has been mongoose-free) occurs in lowland wetlands and valleys, especially the Hanalei and Wailua River valleys, and in irrigation channels on the Mānā Plains in the south-west of the island. A stronghold is the Hanalei National Wildlife Refuge. The Oʻahu population is widespread on the island but is mostly found on the northern and eastern coasts between Waimanalo and Haleiwa. Smaller numbers occur at Pearl Harbor and the Lualualei Valley.

The gallinule inhabits mainly freshwater lowland wetlands, usually below 125 m elevation, such as streams, springs or seeps, natural ponds, marshes, wet meadows, lotus and taro fields, reservoirs, sediment basins, sewage ponds, and drainage ditches. It prefers dense emergent vegetation near open water, often with floating mats of vegetation, with water depths of less than a metre. To a lesser extent it will visit brackish or marine wetlands such as lagoons and shrimp aquaculture ponds. Although the birds are non-migratory, banding studies show that some dispersal occurs in spring between wetlands (and possibly between islands), in response to changes in water levels.

== Status and conservation ==
Population numbers and range of the Hawaiian gallinule declined during the 19th century and the first half of the 20th century. By the late 1940s the conservation status of the subspecies was considered 'precarious'. On Hawaiʻi Island gallinules were last reported in 1887; subsequent attempts to reintroduce them in the late 1920s, and again in the 1950s, failed. They disappeared from Molokaʻi sometime after the 1940s; a 1983 reintroduction was also unsuccessful, with five of the six reintroduced birds being shot for food. In 1967 the gallinule was listed as endangered under the US Federal Endangered Species Act. It is also classified as endangered by the State of Hawaii.

Surveys in the 1950s and 1960s estimated that there were no more than 57 individual birds, though numbers have increased since then. Annual counts of gallinules indicate that recent population numbers are low but relatively stable. Counting such cryptic birds is not easy; over the decade from 1998 to 2007 the average total recorded in the biannual count program was 287 birds (with numbers fluctuating between about 100 and 450), while assessments during the 1970s to the 2000s have estimated the total population at 750 birds.

Causes of the decline include agricultural, residential and recreational development leading to the loss, fragmentation and modification of wetlands. Introduced animals such as bullfrogs, rats, cats, dogs and mongooses prey on the gallinules, especially at their nests. Hunting was also a major factor, at least until it was banned in 1939. Ongoing threats include illegal hunting and the destruction of nests by vandals. As well as occasional attempts to reintroduce gallinules to islands within their former range from which they have been extirpated, conservation efforts focus on the protection and management of wetlands, predator control, the enforcement of strict hunting laws, public education, and working with private organisations and landowners.

== Mythology and cultural use ==
According to Hawaiian historian David Malo the gallinule was regarded as a deity and was worshipped. One version of a legend is that the bird was the keeper of fire for the gods, until the culture hero Maui extracted the secret of firemaking from it; an alternate version is that the bird, taking pity on humanity, stole fire from the gods so that people could keep warm and cook their food. Both versions attribute the red frontal shield of the bird to scorching by fire. Hawaiians also believed that hearing the cry of the bird at night was an unlucky omen, foretelling death. The gallinules were eaten, captured by being run down or by stone-throwing; the flesh is supposedly tasty, though gamey and tough.
