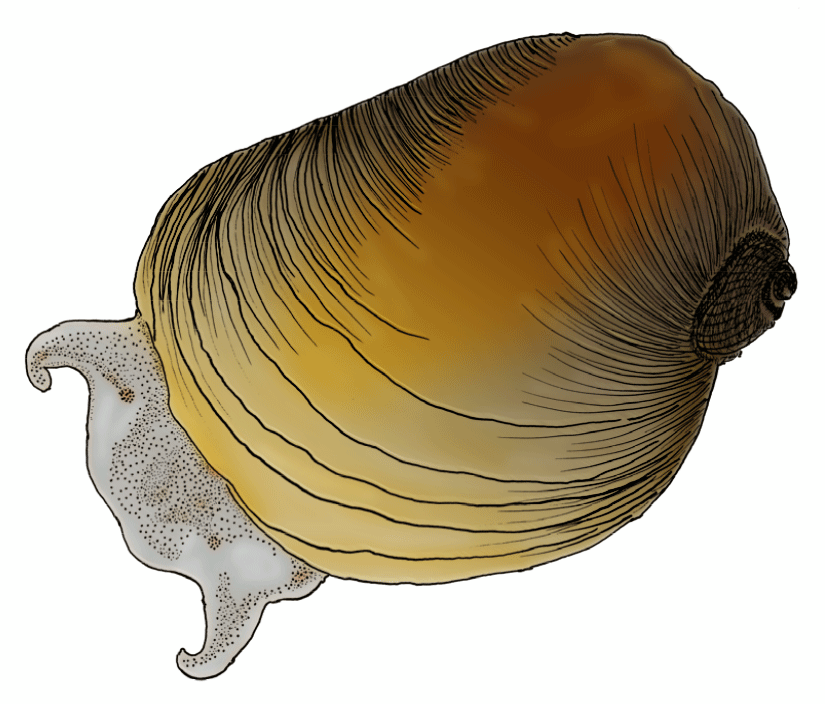
- Erinna newcombi, a species with a sinistral shell

Scientific classification
- Kingdom: Animalia
- Phylum: Mollusca
- Class: Gastropoda
- Superorder: Hygrophila
- Family: Lymnaeidae
- Subfamily: Lymnaeinae
- Genus: Erinna; H. Adams & A. Adams, 1855

Type species
- Erinna newcombi H. Adams & A. Adams, 1855

= Erinna (gastropod) =

Genus of gastropods

Erinna is a genus of air-breathing, freshwater snails, aquatic pulmonate gastropod mollusks in the family Lymnaeidae, the pond snails. This genus is endemic to the Hawaiian Islands, United States.

== Species ==
Species within the genus Erinna include:

- Erinna aulacospira (Ancey, 1889) – this species is considered as possibly extinct.
- Erinna newcombi H. Adams & A. Adams, 1855 – Newcomb's snail, type species
