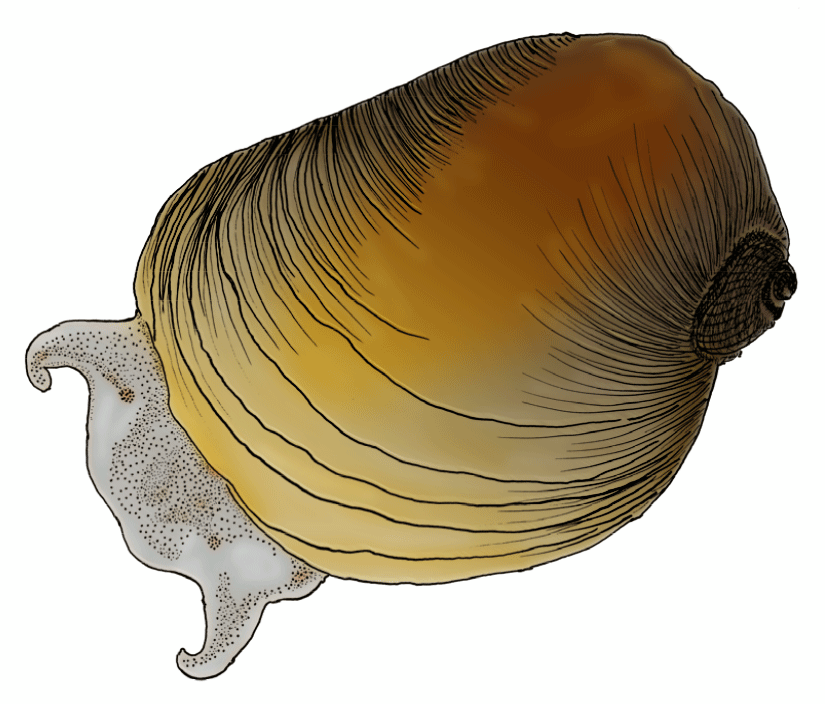
- Drawing of Erinna newcombi.

Conservation status
- Vulnerable (IUCN 3.1)

- Critically Imperiled (NatureServe)

Scientific classification
- Kingdom: Animalia
- Phylum: Mollusca
- Class: Gastropoda
- Superorder: Hygrophila
- Family: Lymnaeidae
- Genus: Erinna
- Species: E. newcombi

Binomial name
- Erinna newcombi H. Adams & A. Adams, 1855

= Newcomb's snail =

Species of mollusc

Newcomb's snail (Erinna newcombi) is a species of air-breathing freshwater snail, a gastropod mollusk in the family Lymnaeidae. This species is endemic to Hawaii, in the United States, and its natural habitat is rivers. It is threatened by habitat loss.

Erinna newcombi is the type species of the genus Erinna.

== Taxonomy ==
The scientific collection efforts of the United States Exploring Expedition of 1838 to 1842 obtained the first known specimens of Newcomb's snails. Historical documents indicate that the specimens were collected sometime between 25 October and 6 November 1840, at "Hanapēpē Falls," presumably what is now called Manuwaiopuna Falls, or possibly one of several other waterfalls located in the middle Hanapēpē watershed of southeast Kauaʻi. Individuals from this early collection made their way to the British Museum of Natural History and were used as the type specimens from which the species was later described in 1855.

As type locality is referred: "Heneta River, Kami, Sandwich Islands", which means Hanalei River, Kauai, Hawaii. English common name and also specific name is in honor of Dr. Wesley Newcomb, that collected them in Hawaii. Erinna newcombi is one of four species of Lymnaeidae snails are native to Hawaii. Three of these species inhabit two or more of the eight main islands. The fourth species, Newcomb's snail, is restricted to the island of Kauaʻi.

A Japanese lymnaeid exhibits a very similar reduced shell shape, but a study of chromosome numbers suggests that Newcomb's snail's evolutionary ties lie with the rest of the Hawaiian lymnaeids, all of which are derived from North American ancestors. Therefore, it appears that parallel evolution of similar shell morphology occurred between these two distinct lineages of lymnaeid snails.

At the present time, no completely accepted nomenclature exists for the genera of Hawaiian lymnaeids, although each of these snail species, including Newcomb's snail, is recognized as a valid species. Bengt Hubendick (1952) did not believe the distinctive shell form (described below) and reduced structures of the nervous system of Newcomb's snail warranted a genus (second species of the genus Erinna is considered extinct). In fact, Hubendick included all Hawaiian lymnaeids in the genus Lymnaea. Joseph Paul Eldred Morrison (1968) contradicted Hubendick and argued the distinctive shell characters of Newcomb's snail supported the generic name Erinna. John B. Burch (1968), Charlotte M. Patterson and Burch (1978), Dwight Willard Taylor (1988), and Robert H. Cowie et al. (1995) all followed Morrison and referred to Newcomb's snail as Erinna newcombi, which is the currently accepted scientific name.

== Description ==
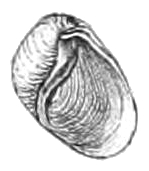
An apertural view of a shell of Erinna newcombi.

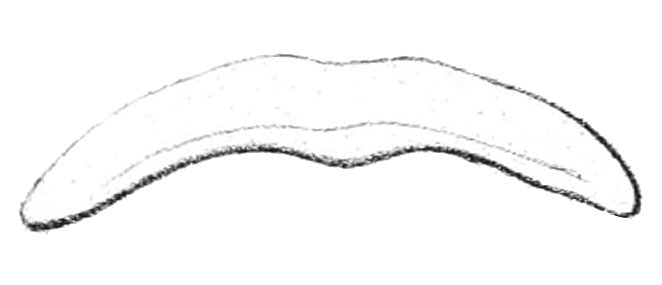
Jaw of Newcomb's snail.

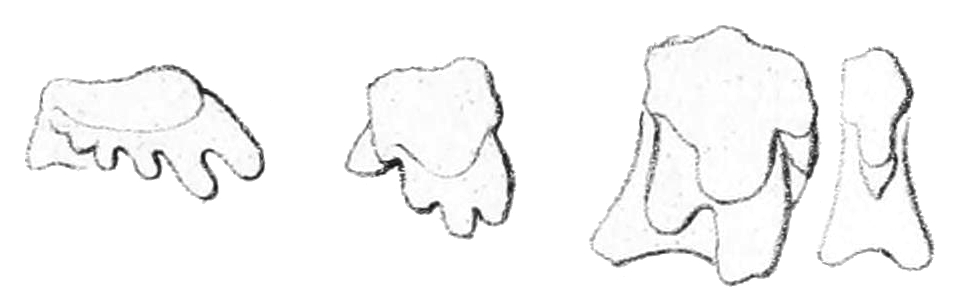
Drawing of extreme marginal teeth (on the left), marginal teeth (in the center of the image), and central and lateral teeth (on the right) of radula of Newcomb's snail.

Newcomb's snail is unique among the Hawaiian lymnaeids in that the shell spire, typically associated with lymnaeids, is substantially reduced. The result is a nearly smooth, brown to black shell formed by a single, oval whorl, 6 mm (0.24 in) long and 3 mm (0.12 in) wide.

The shell is semi-globose, thin, horny, olivaceous, longitudinally finely striated. The spire is very short, obtuse. The apex is rather eroded. The last whorl is ventricose. The aperture is large and semi-ovate. The inner-lip is posteriorly ascending on the body whorl. The columella is straight, excavated, and with a curved, elevated, external ridge continued in front into the outer lip which is simple and acute.

The jaw is low, wide, slightly arcuate, ends pointed; a decided median projection to the cutting edge. The anterior surface of the jaw is smooth.

The radula is as usual in the Helicidae. The central tooth is long and narrow, small in proportion to the laterals, the reflected portion has one long median cusp, the side cusps being subobsolete. The lateral teeth are wide, broad as long, the reflected portion almost as large as the whole base of attachment, and tricuspid, the inner cusp very small, the median cusp large and bluntly truncated, the outer cusp smaller than the median and bluntly pointed. The marginal teeth are subquadrate, wider than high, the apex reflected, obliquely produced and bearing five or more blunt, short denticles, of which the inner two are the largest.

== Distribution ==
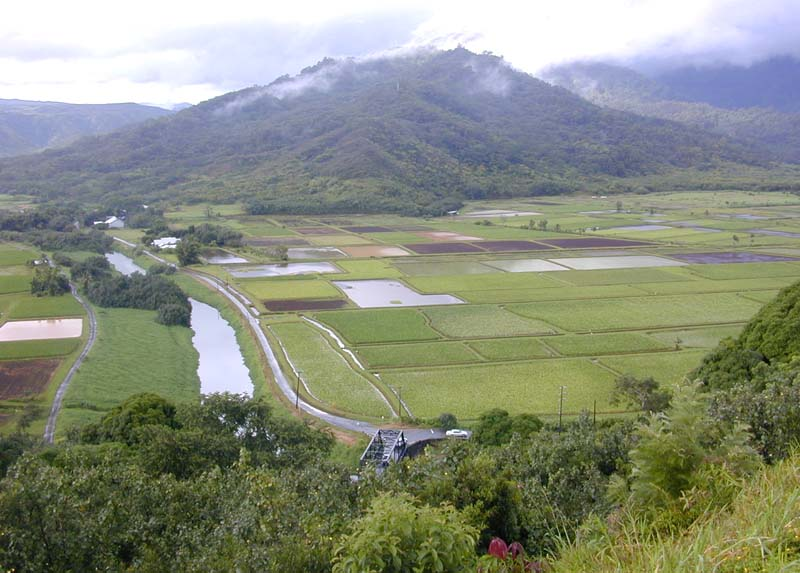
Hanalei River, where the Newcomb's snail lives

Newcomb's snail is endemic and restricted to the island of Kauaʻi. A number of very large watersheds traverse the southeast quadrant of the Kauaʻi island, including Olokele Stream, Hanapēpē Stream and Waimea River, all of which have numerous tributaries. No recent surveys for Newcomb's snails have been undertaken in the Hanapēpē watershed, or in any of the large neighboring stream systems, because they are located on privately owned lands and are difficult to reach because of the rough terrain. It is possible that Newcomb's snail populations remain in that region of Kauaʻi.

Until about 1925, snails were collected from small sites located in Kalalau Stream, Hanakoa Stream, Hanakāpī`ai Stream, Wainiha River, and Keālia Stream. Three of these populations (Hanakoa Stream, Hanakāpī`ai Stream, Wainiha River) are now thought to be extirpated. Since about 1993, Federal and State agencies, academic researchers, and other interested parties have conducted opportunistic surveys at approximately 50 sites along numerous streams and their associated tributaries and springs on Kaua'i, and have located four previously unknown populations of Newcomb's snail. These recently discovered populations are located in Lumaha`i River, the Hanalei River, Makaleha Stream (a tributary to Kapa`a Stream), and the North Fork Wailua River. With the exception of the snails at Makaleha Springs, most of these populations have only been observed once or twice. Recently, two individual snails were reported from a single site in Limahuli Stream in the Hanalei District of Kauaʻi's north shore. However, if a viable population of Newcomb's snail exists in the Limahuli watershed, its location remains unknown, therefore Limahuli Stream is not considered to have a "population" of Newcomb's snails.

Recent survey work conducted from 1994 to 2003 limits the known range of Newcomb's snail to small sites located in a total of six watersheds in north- and east-facing drainages on Kauaʻi. They are: Kalalau Stream, Lumaha`i River, Hanalei River (four subpopulations), Keālia Stream, Makaleha Stream (two subpopulations), and the North Fork Wailua River. The term "subpopulation" refers to a discreet group of individuals, separated from other discrete groups within a single watershed. Because of low mobility, no interaction between subpopulations exists. No historical information is available on the population sizes of Newcomb's snail. However, anecdotal reports indicate the Kalalau Stream and Lumaha`i River populations of Newcomb's snails are larger in comparison to the other four.

== Ecology ==
Newcomb's snail is an obligate freshwater species. The details of its ecology, such as life span, reproductive cycle, and number of eggs/young, are unknown.

Newcomb's snail is active during the day.

Newcomb's snail probably shares life history similarities with other members of its family. Lymnaeid snails generally feed on algae and vegetation growing on submerged rocks. Snails attach eggs to submerged rocks or vegetation and larval stages do not disperse widely; the entire life cycle is tied to the stream system in which the adults live. Little is known about the biological or environmental factors affecting Newcomb's snail population size, however, important factors may include: annual, multi-year, or decadal changes in stream flows; severe weather, high flow, or channel-scouring events; and periods of prolonged drought. Snail dispersal both upstream and downstream within a stream system probably plays an important function in colonizing or recolonizing suitable habitat, particularly microhabitat protected from channel scour. Dispersal of Newcomb's snail between stream systems is likely infrequent because of their obligate freshwater habitat requirements; historic dispersal probably relied on long-term erosional events that captured adjacent stream systems. This life history differs greatly from the freshwater Hawaiian neritid snails (Neritina granosa, Neritina vespertina) that have marine larvae that migrate into and up streams following a period of oceanic dispersal. Most likely, the planktonic larvae of the neritid snails disperse across the oceanic expanses that separate the main Hawaiian Islands and can colonize streams on any or all of these islands. Newcomb's snail lacks this dispersal capacity.

=== Habitat ===
On the basis of past and recent field observations, the specific habitat requirements of Newcomb's snail include fast-flowing perennial streams and associated springs, seeps, and vertical or overhanging waterfalls. Surveys of main stream channels of many of the perennial streams of Kaua`i indicate Newcomb's snail is only found in areas protected from high scouring flows within main stream channels. The limited occurrence of this snail in main stream channels is likely due to periodic channel scouring by sediment, rocks, and boulders that are moved downstream during high flow runoff events. Consequently, suitable habitat is generally restricted to protected, small, spring-fed tributaries, or to stream segments with overhanging waterfalls that have perennial flows supported by stable groundwater input. The common element among sites harboring snail populations is that the water source appears to be consistent and permanent, even during severe drought.

Limited to a relatively narrow zone of mid-elevation sites, populations of Newcomb's snail are found at an average elevation of 306 meters (1,004 feet), and range between 196 and 396 meters (643 and 1,299 ft).

It is suspected that the four species of introduced caddisflies Trichoptera are adversely impacting native aquatic invertebrate populations either through competition for space and resources, or because of its large body size and sheer abundance in Hawaiian streams. For example, a single caddisfly species accounted for 57% of all biota collected in the upper elevation Kauaʻi streams.

=== Predators ===
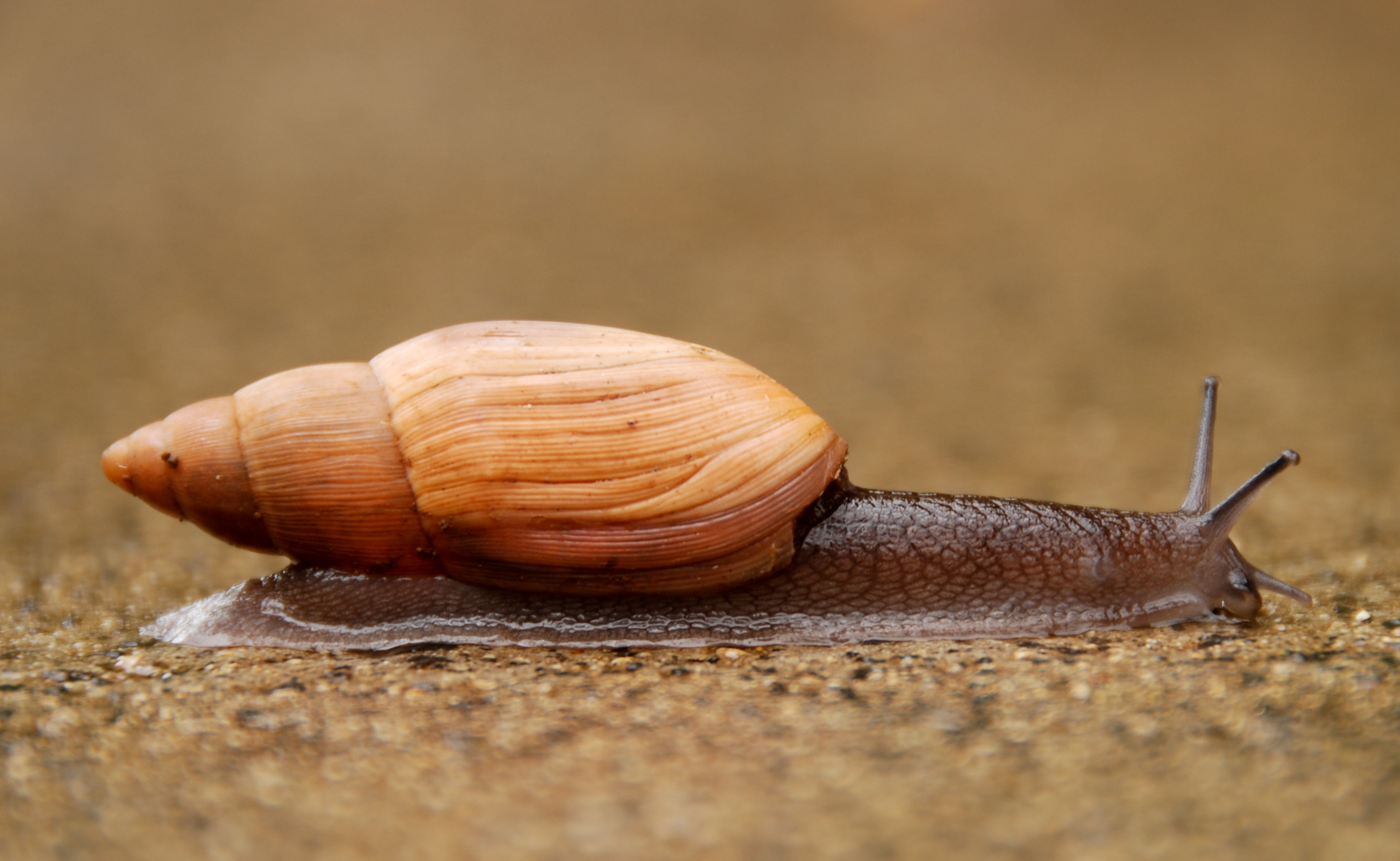
The glandina snail Euglandina rosea is one of the known predators of the Newcomb's snail

Predation by the non-native rosy glandina snail Euglandina rosea remains a serious threat to the survival of Newcomb's snail. This predatory snail, introduced into Hawai`i in 1955, has established populations throughout the main islands. The rosy glandina feeds on snails and slugs, and field studies document that it readily feeds on native snails found in Hawai`i. Furthermore, the rosy glandina snail exhibits remarkable hunting behaviors leading to capture and predation of submerged prey. Although terrestrial, the rosy glandina will fully immerse itself in water to locate and feed on aquatic molluscs such as Newcomb's snail. The rosy glandina has been observed on the wet, algae-covered rocks of the Makaleha Stream in close proximity to individual Newcomb's snails, and is believed to prey on them. The rosy glandina snail is responsible for the extirpation of many populations and even the extinction of numerous species of native snails throughout the Pacific Islands, and represents a significant threat to the survival of Newcomb's snail.

Predation on the eggs and adults of native Hawaiian lymnaeid snails by two non-native species of sciomyzid flies, marsh fly Sepedomerus macropus and Sepedon aenescens represents a significant threat to the survival of Newcomb's snail. They feed on lymnaeid snails and were introduced into Hawaii in 1958 and 1966, respectively. These predatory flies were intended to act as biological control agents for the non-native lymnaeid snail Galba viridis (=Fossaria viridis), (an intermediate host of the cattle liver fluke Fasciola gigantica). These biological control species may represent a significant threat to Newcomb's snail and other native lymnaeid snails.

Several introduced, predatory aquatic species, including the green swordtail fish Xyphophorus helleri, the American bullfrog Rana catesbeiana, the wrinkled frog Rana rugosa, and the cane toad Bufo marinus potentially threaten populations of Newcomb's snail. All potentially prey on the Newcomb's snail.

=== Population size ===
On the basis of these data from the 6 existing populations of Newcomb's snails can be estimated a total population of approximately 6,000 to 7,000 individuals. The great majority of these snails, perhaps over 90%, were located in the two populations at Kalalau and Lumaha`i. Terrain occupied by Newcomb's snail populations is remote and extremely rugged. Three of the six populations can only be visited using helicopter transport, although the Kalalau Stream population potentially could be accessed in summer months with boat support and strenuous hiking. Because of the difficulty in accessing the sites, no comprehensive Newcomb's snail population census has been undertaken since 1995, and changes to the population since that time remain undocumented.

The total area inhabited by Newcomb's snails at any one location is remarkably small, from just 2 square meters (22 square feet) – Makaleha waterfall, Hanalei subpopulations; to a maximum of 30 square meters (320 square feet) – Makaleha Springs subpopulation. Microhabitat characteristics limiting suitable habitat remain unknown. Because known populations are confined to such small areas, they are highly vulnerable to eradication by unpredictable catastrophic events. Flooding due to hurricanes and tropical storms, catastrophic landslides, drought, infestation by introduced invasive species, and other localized phenomena that occur unpredictably could eradicate Newcomb's snail habitat across significant portions of the island. Recent examples of such recurring natural events include Hurricane Iniki (a Category IV hurricane that devastated Kaua`i on 11 September 1992), Hurricane Iwa (23 November 1982), and the large upper Olokele Valley landslide of 31 October 1981. Each of these events greatly impacted and may have eliminated large areas of unsurveyed potential Newcomb's snail habitat. Any recovery planning effort must take the island-wide distribution of Newcomb's snails into account to ensure maintenance of separate populations in watersheds geographically distributed throughout the island.

== Conservation ==
Newcomb's snails face a continued threat from human-caused changes to the hydrologic landscape of Kauaʻi, that causes severe degradation of natural aquatic environments. Such changes include large irrigation, extensive plantation style agriculture diverting water out of both surface waterbodies and groundwater sources.

In 1995, prior to Newcomb's snail being listed as threatened, the County of Kaua`i planned a major water diversion project to capture flow from Makaleha Springs for domestic use. The project construction and operation was expected to eliminate the entire subpopulation of Newcomb's snail at Makaleha Springs. The application process was continued by the Kaua`i Board of Water Supply and cleared a number of State and local regulatory reviews. Ultimately, the State Commission on Water Resource Management denied the applicable permits on the basis of numerous unresolved environmental issues, including impacts to aquatic life.

Erinna newcombi is listed as vulnerable species in 2006 IUCN Red List and also in 2009 IUCN Red List.

This species is listed as threatened on the United States Fish and Wildlife Service list of endangered species under the authority of the Endangered Species Act of 1973, since 26 January 2000. Such Hawaiian species are automatically added to the State of Hawaii's list of protected species.

Critical habitat (specific geographic area essential for the conservation) for the Newcomb's snail was designated 20 August 2002. The designation includes eight stream segments and associated tributaries, springs, seeps, and adjacent riparian areas totaling 1,812 hectares (4,480 acres), and including 19.76 kilometers (12.28 mi) of stream channel. Critical habitat for the Newcomb's snail includes the six stream locations known to be occupied and two sites where snails were observed historically but are now thought to be extirpated (Hanakoa Stream and Hanakāpī`ai Stream).

Newcomb's snail is the first and only freshwater organism found in Hawai`i listed under Federal and State law as threatened. The Hawaii Department of Land and Natural Resources, Division of Aquatic Resources is building its capacity to undertake research and implement management directed towards conservation of rare and vulnerable aquatic species such as the Newcomb's snail. Interaction between the State Division of Aquatic Resources management and staff and our endangered species biologists will assist development of an institutional framework to accomplish effective conservation for the Newcomb's snail. In 2024, Newcomb's snail was designated as one of Hawaii's state snails in order to educate and raise awareness about the conservation of the species.
