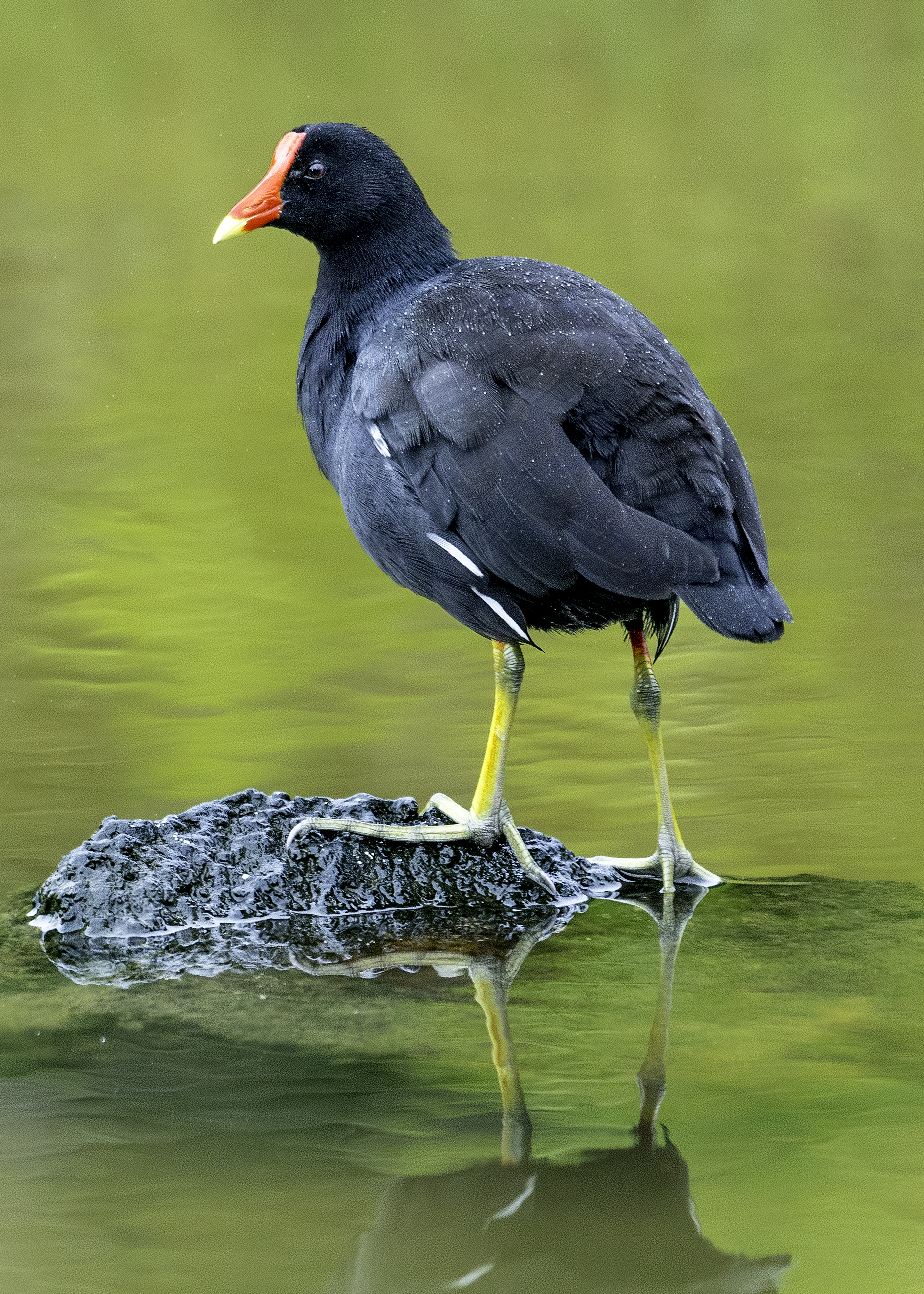
- Common gallinule on Santa Cruz. Galápagos Islands, Ecuador

Conservation status
- Least Concern (IUCN 3.1)

Scientific classification
- Kingdom: Animalia
- Phylum: Chordata
- Class: Aves
- Order: Gruiformes
- Family: Rallidae
- Genus: Gallinula
- Species: G. galeata

Binomial name
- Gallinula galeata (Lichtenstein, MHC, 1818)

Subspecies
- About 7; see text
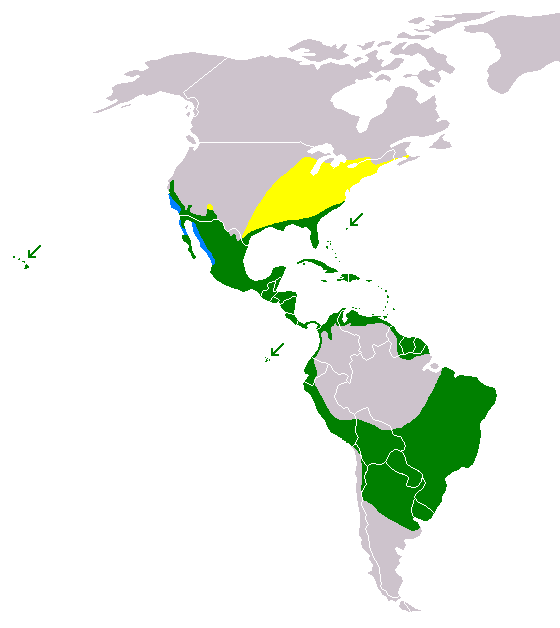
- Range of G. galeata Breeding range Year-round range Wintering range

Synonyms
- Gallinula brodkorbi McCoy, 1963

= Common gallinule =

Species of bird

The common gallinule (Gallinula galeata) is a bird in the family Rallidae. It was split from the common moorhen by the American Ornithologists' Union in July 2011. It lives around well-vegetated marshes, ponds, canals, and other wetlands in the Americas. The common gallinule is one of the most conspicuous rail species in North America, along with the American coot.

== Description and ecology ==
The gallinule has dark plumage apart from the white undertail, yellow legs and a red frontal shield. The young are browner and lack the red shield. It has a wide range of gargling calls and will emit loud hisses when threatened.

Measurements:

- Length: 32–35 cm (12 1/2–14 in)
- Weight: 310–456 g (10 7/8–16 1/8 oz)
- Wingspan: 54–62 cm (21 1/2–24 1/2 in)

This is a common breeding bird in marsh environments and well-vegetated lakes. Populations in areas where the waters freeze, such as southern Canada and the northern USA, will migrate to more temperate climes. This species will consume a wide variety of vegetable material and small aquatic creatures. It forages beside or in the water, sometimes upending in the water to feed. Its wide feet allow it to hop about on lily pads. It is often secretive, but can become tame in some areas. Despite loss of habitat in parts of its range, the common gallinule remains plentiful and widespread.

The common gallinule will fight to defend its territory. The nest is a basket built on the ground in dense vegetation. Laying starts in spring, between mid-March and mid-May in northern hemisphere temperate regions. About 8 eggs are usually laid per female early in the season; a brood later in the year usually has only 5–8 or even fewer eggs. Nests may be re-used by different females. Incubation lasts about three weeks. Both parents incubate and feed the young. These fledge after 40–50 days, become independent usually a few weeks thereafter, and may raise their first brood the next spring. When threatened, the young may cling to a parent's body, after which the adult birds fly away to safety, carrying their offspring with them.

This species is parasitized by the moorhen flea, Dasypsyllus gallinulae.

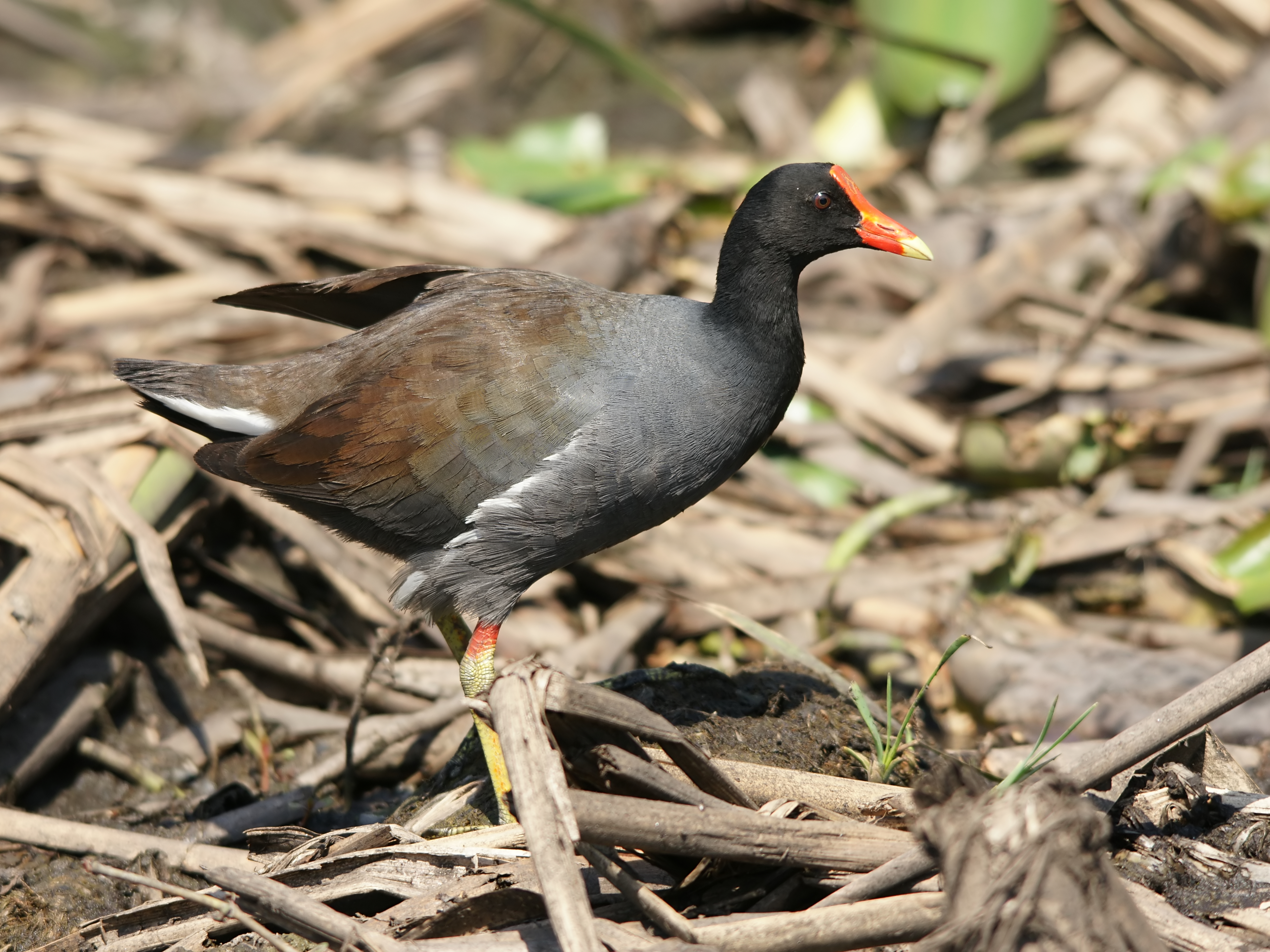
Everglades National Park

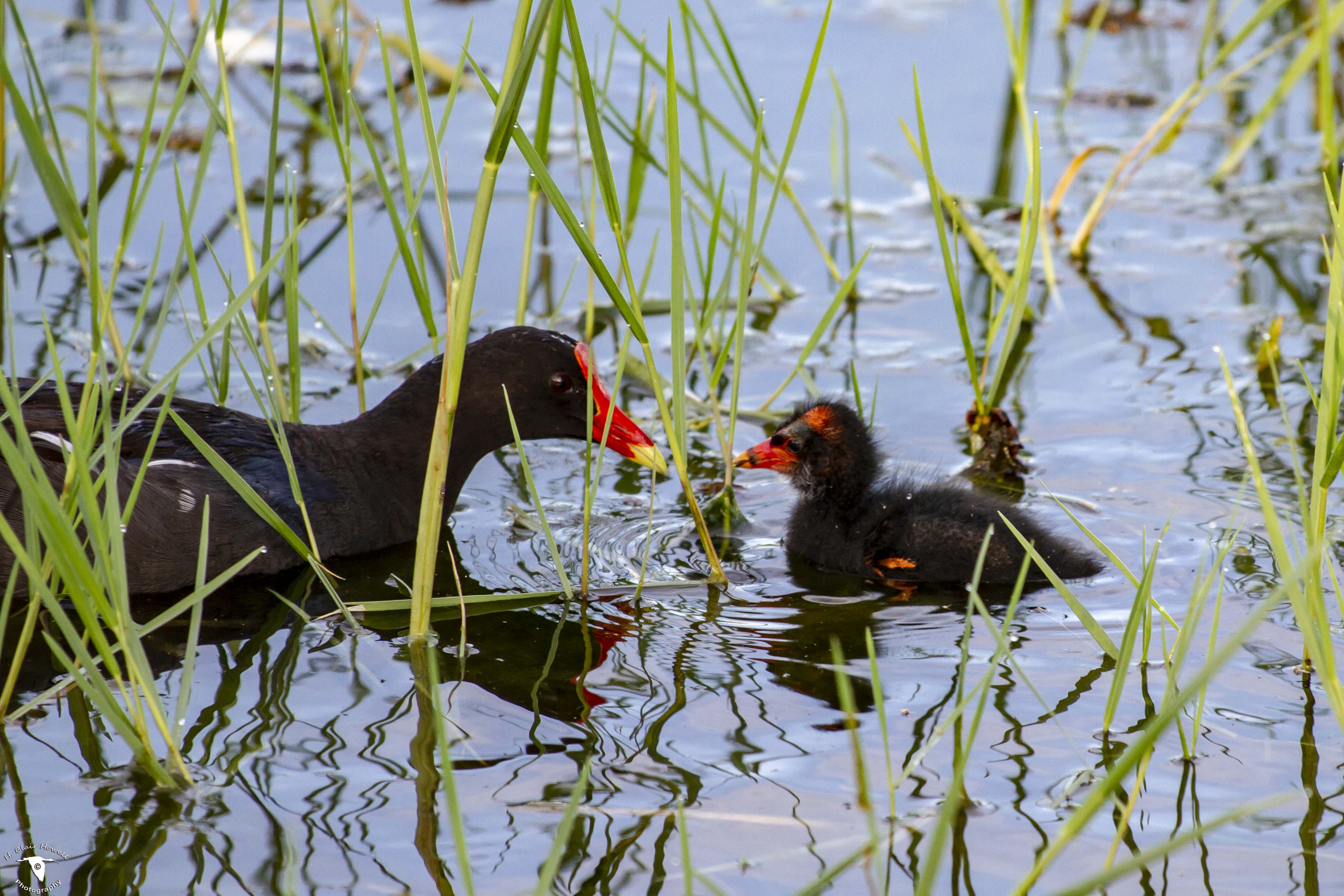
Adult with chick, Florida

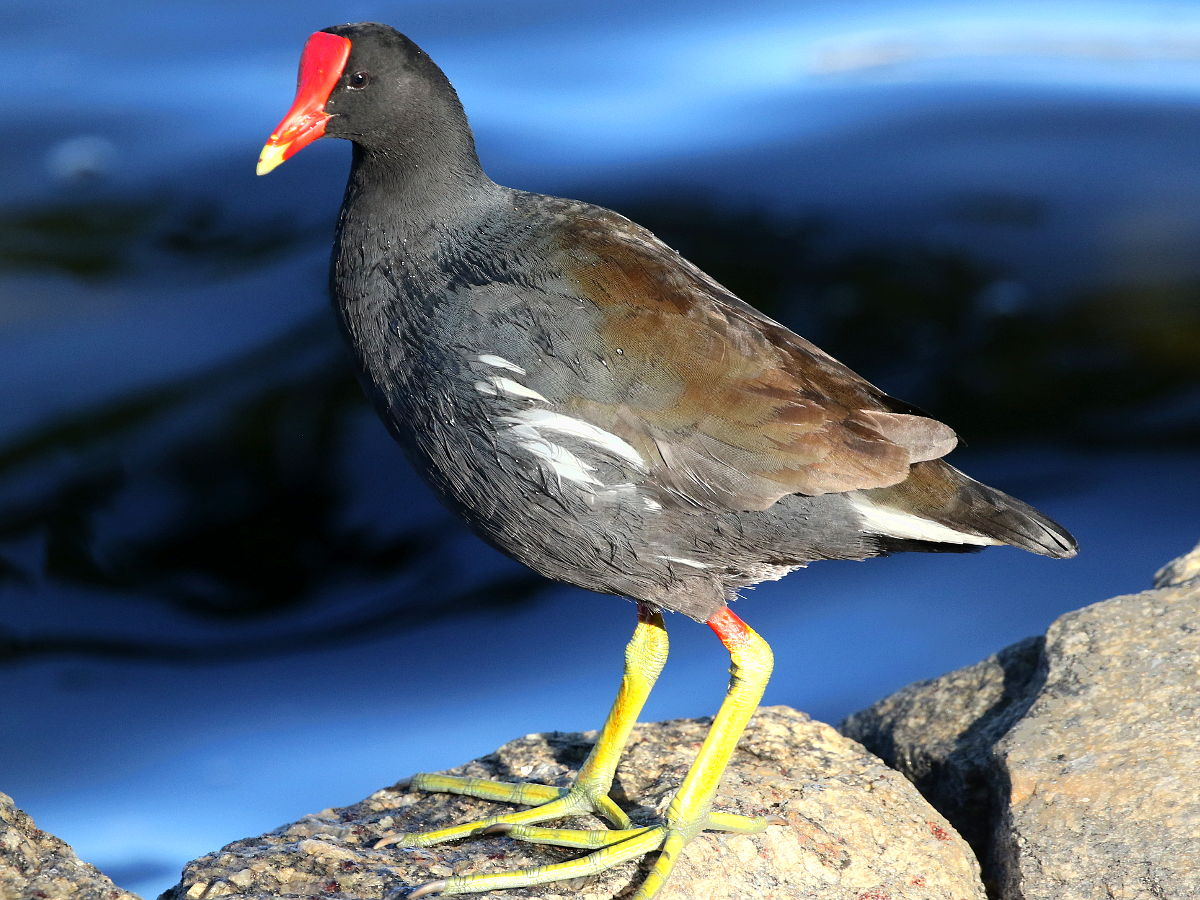
Rodrigo de Freitas Lagoon, Brazil

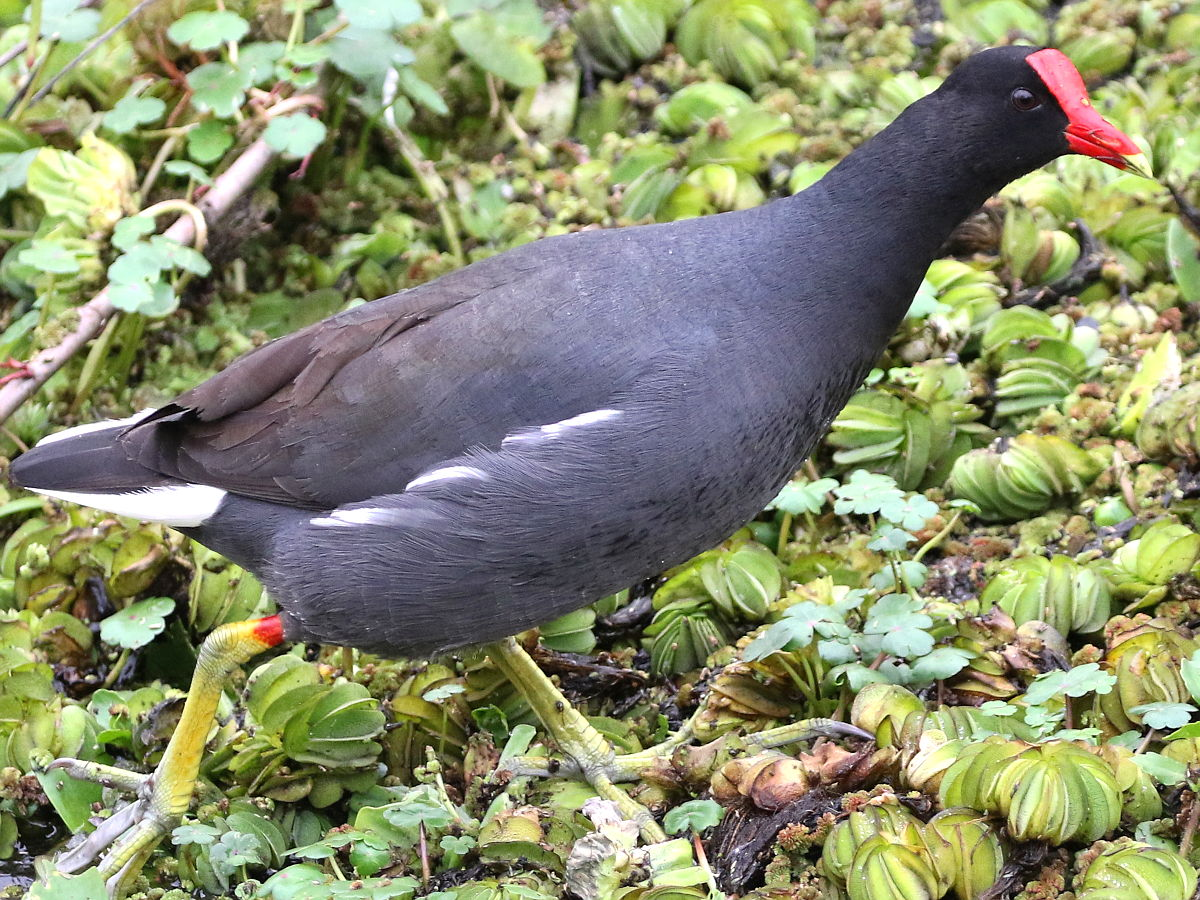
Costanera Sur Ecological Reserve, Argentina

== Subspecies ==
Seven subspecies are today considered valid; others have been described that are now considered junior synonyms. Most are not very readily recognizable, as differences are rather subtle and often clinal. Usually, the location of a sighting is the most reliable indication as to subspecies identification, but the migratory tendencies of this species make identifications based on location not completely reliable.

In addition to the extant subspecies listed below, there is a Pleistocene population known from fossils: the larger, stout and long-winged paleosubspecies G. g. brodkorbi is known from the Ichetucknee River deposits in Florida. It was originally described as a distinct species, but is probably the direct ancestor of some of today's common gallinules. The presence in the same deposits of fossils typical of the shorter-winged and more delicate G. g. cerceris suggests that G. g. brodkorbi was not ancestral to the Antillean (Florida) gallinule of our time but rather to the more northerly North American subspecies.

List of subspecies by date of description
Common and trinomial names	Description	Range
Southern American common gallinule G. g. galeata (Lichtenstein, 1818)	Wings and back are fairly uniform dark brownish slate grey.	Found in Trinidad, the Guyanas, and from Brazil south of the Amazonas to north Argentina and Uruguay.
Andean common gallinule G. g. garmani (Allen, 1876)	Similar to galeata, but larger.	Found in the Andes from Peru to northwest Argentina.
Hawaiian gallinule G. g. sandvicensis (Streets, 1877); Called ʻalae ʻula ("red Hawaiian coot") in Hawaiian.	Has a large frontal shield; the tarsus is reddish-orange in front.	Endemic to the Hawaiian Islands.
Antillean common gallinule G. g. cerceris (Bangs, 1910); The now obsolete name of Florida gallinule was once used in the U.S.	Has a long bill and large feet and is less brown above.	Found in the Caribbean, except Trinidad and Barbados; also found in south Florida.
North American common gallinule G. g. cachinnans (Bangs, 1915); Also known as common gallinule and marsh hen.	Similar to cerceris, but upperparts coloration more like the common moorhen (G. chloropus).	Ranges from southeast Canada south through the US, excluding the Great Plains region, to west Panama; also found in the Galápagos and Bermuda.
Subandean common gallinule G. g. pauxilla (Bangs, 1915)	Similar to cerceris, but smaller.	Found in lowland areas of east Panama south to northwest Peru.
Barbados common gallinule G. g. barbadensis (Bond, 1954)	Similar to cerceris, but with lighter head and neck, and less dull grey overall.	Endemic to Barbados.
