= Hanalei Pier =

- U.S. National Register of Historic Places
- Hawaiʻi Register of Historic Places
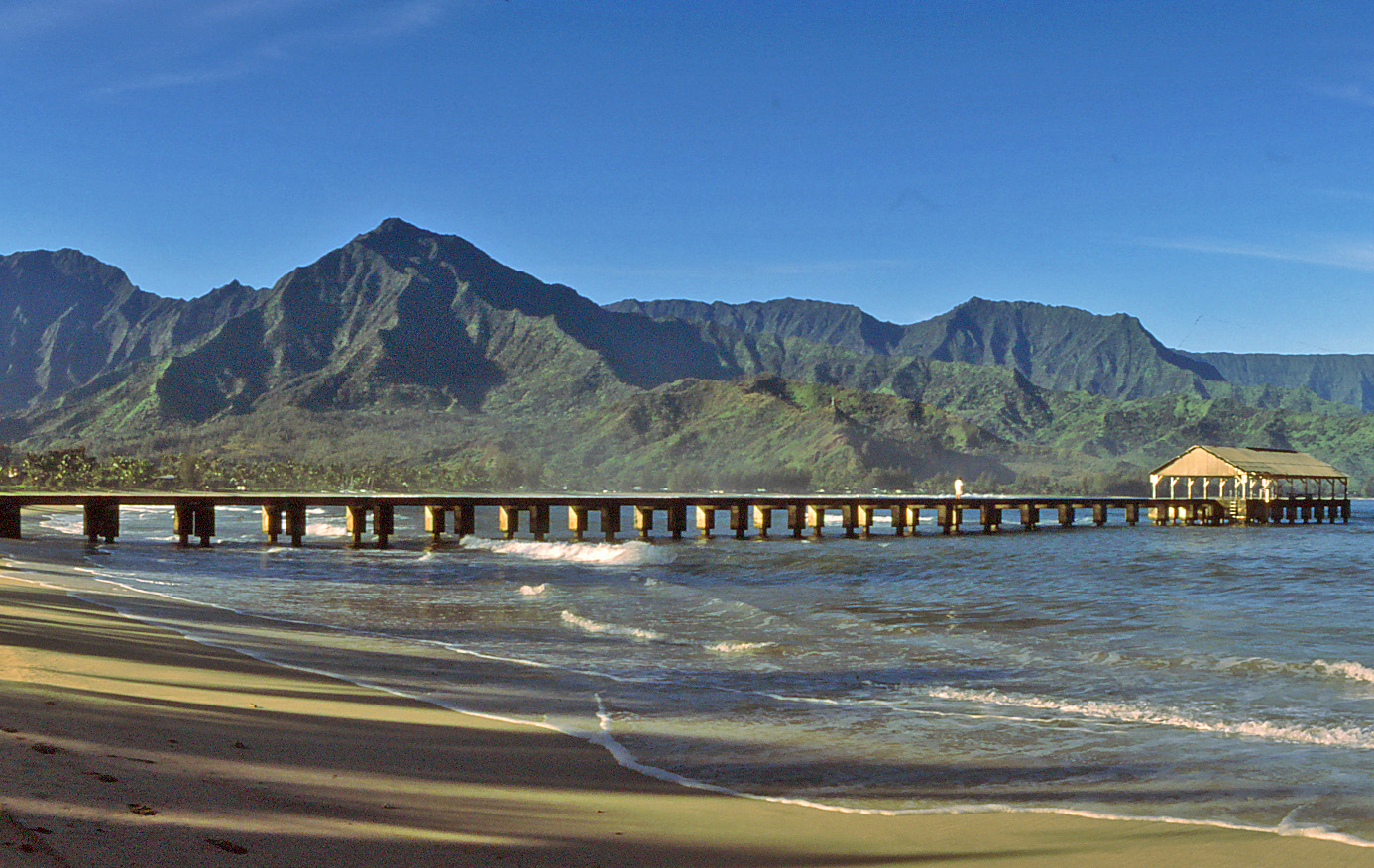

- Location within Hawaii
- Location: Weke Road, Hanalei Bay; Hanalei, Hawaii
- Coordinates: 22°12′44″N 159°29′49″W
- Area: 0.3 acres (0.12 ha)
- Built: 1912
- NRHP reference No.: 79000757
- HRHP No.: 50-30-11-09382

Significant dates
- Added to NRHP: September 13, 1979
- Designated HRHP: June 12, 1979

Hanalei Pier is a pier built into Hanalei Bay on the northern shore of the island of Kauaʻi in the state of Hawaii.

== History ==
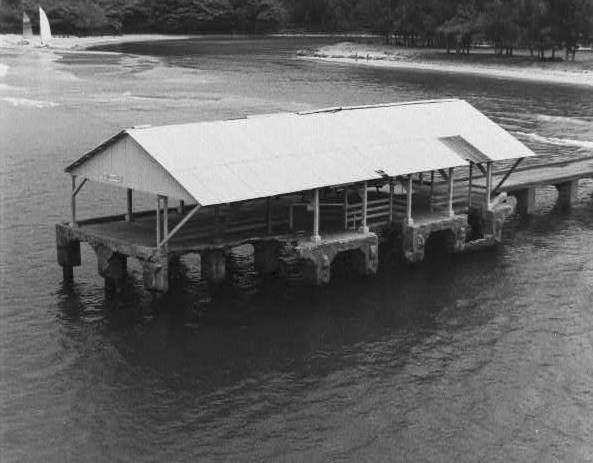
The end of Hanalei Pier as it appeared in 1978.

The wetlands of Hanalei Bay were used to grow taro by ancient Hawaiians. By the 1860s, the shrinking population of native Hawaiians was being replaced by ethnic Chinese people when their contracts expired on sugarcane plantations in Hawaii, such as the one directly to the north in Princeville. The new crop was rice, which was shipped to Honolulu to become the second largest export crop of the islands. After the annexation of Hawaii to the US in 1898, Hawaiian rice could not compete with rice grown in California and shipments declined.

The pier was originally built of wood before 1892. In the early 1900s work began to extend the pier, and it was eventually lengthened to 340 feet (100 m) in 1912. In 1921 the legislature authorized US$25,000 for a new concrete deck, as the wooden deck was too difficult to maintain in the tropical climate. Conney and Morris were selected as contractors, and finished the construction of the new deck by the end of 1922. A shed roof was constructed at the far end of the pier in the 1940s.

The pier has been a gathering place for the citizens of Hanalei since it was abandoned for shipping in 1933. It was also the main filming area for the 1954 film Beachhead and the 1957 film South Pacific. The pier was added to the National Register of Historic Places listings in Hawaii on September 13, 1979, as site 79000757.

The pier was heavily damaged in 1992 as a result of Hurricane Iniki. In 2012–13, the canopy at the end of the pier was restored. The Hanalei Rotary Club raised over $170,000 to restore the neglected canopy in a program coined "Save the Pier."

Although originally owned by the state, the land at the base of the pier is a Kauaʻi County park known as Black Pot Beach. It is located at the end of Weke Road north of Route 560. Adjacent to the north is the mouth of the Hanalei River, where a public boat landing provides recreational and commercial access.
