= Hanalei Bay =

Bay on Kauaʻi, Hawaii

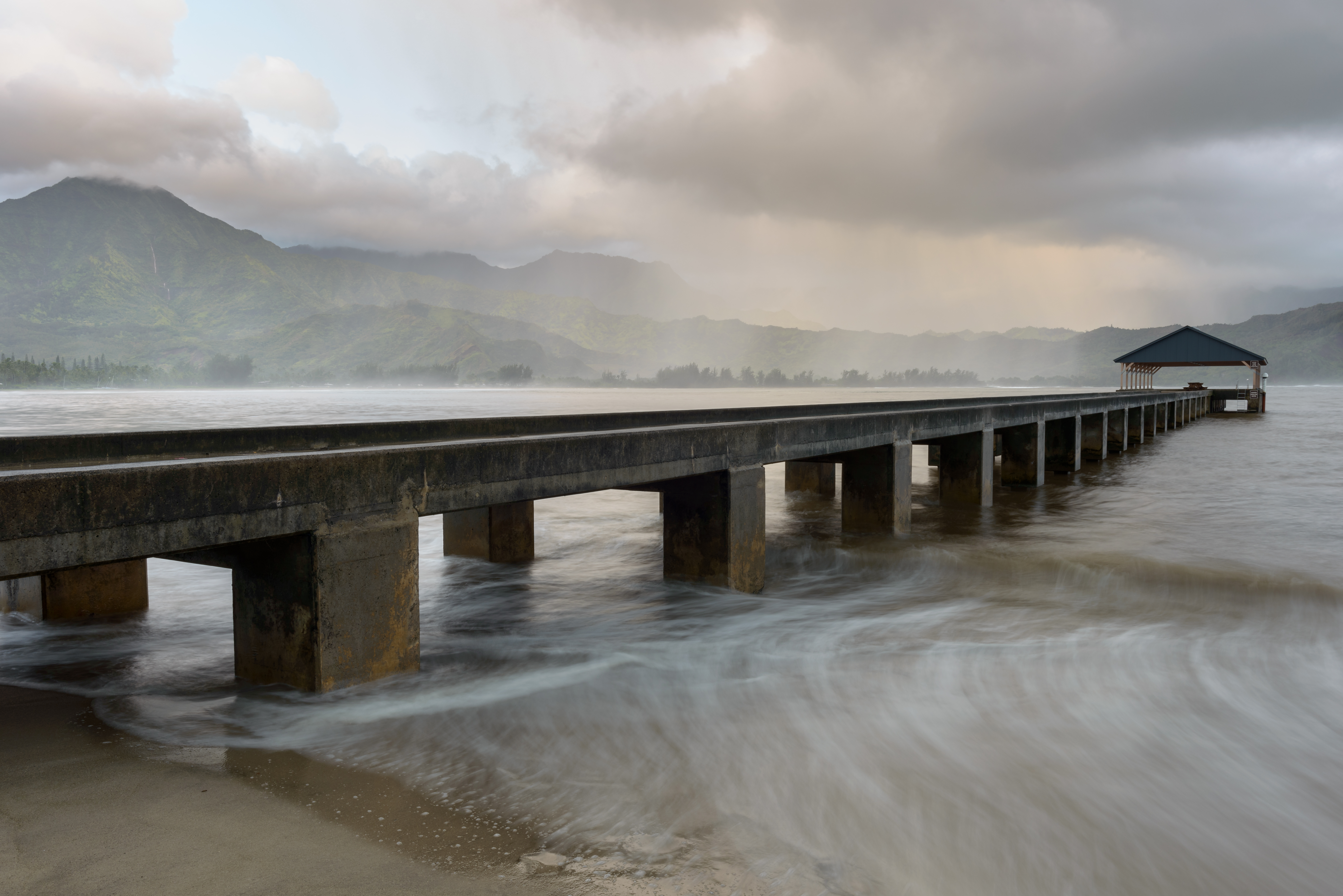
Hanalei Pier

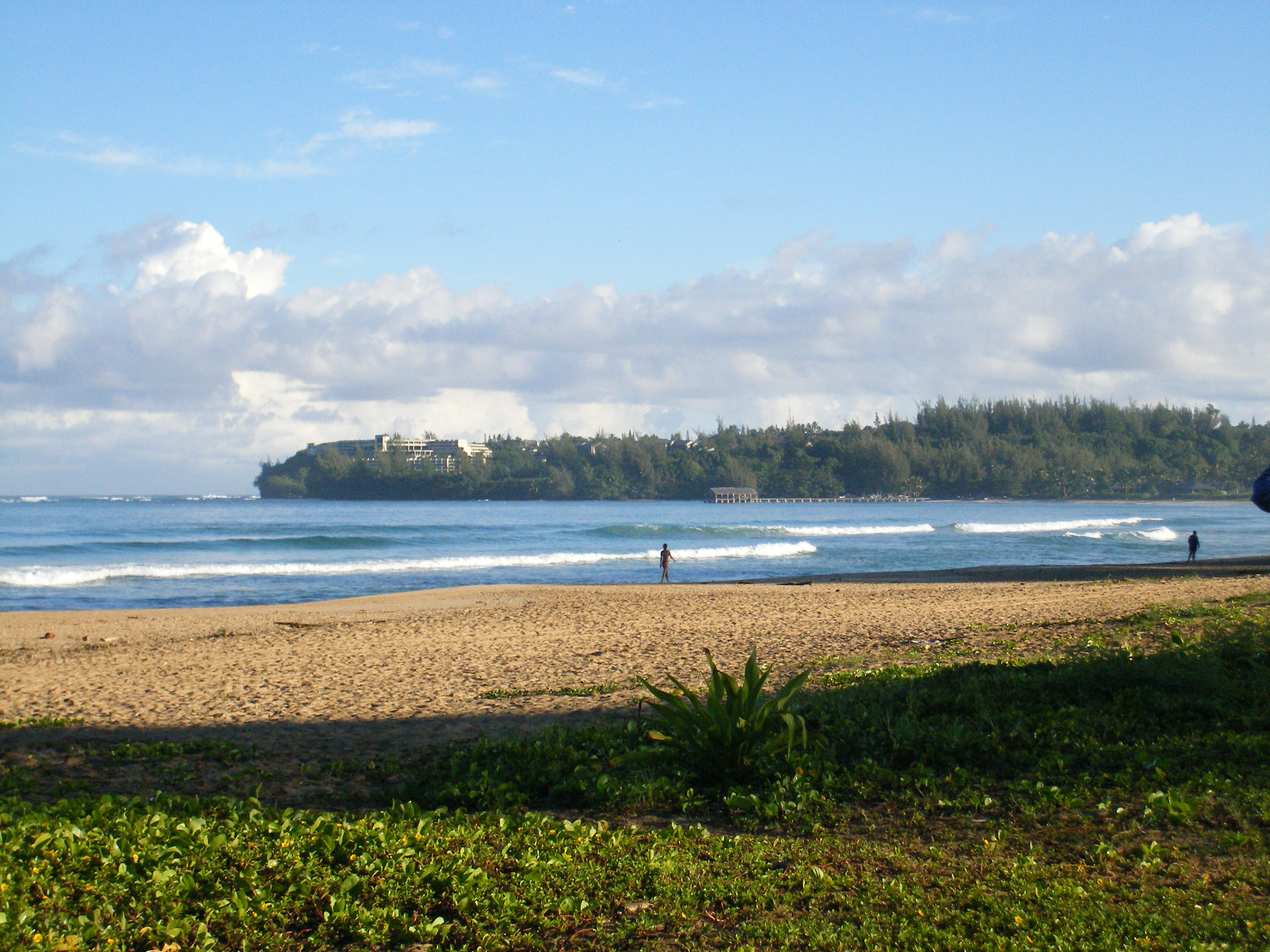
Hanalei Bay

Hanalei Bay is the largest bay on the north shore of Kauaʻi island in Hawaii. The town of Hanalei is at the midpoint of the bay.

== Geography ==
Hanalei Bay consists of nearly 2 miles (3.2 km) of beach, surrounded by mountains. In the summer, the bay offers excellent mooring for sailboats, stand up paddle boarding and swimming. The Princeville community overlooks from the northeast entrance to the bay of Hanalei River, 22°12′52″N 159°29′52″W. During the winter the surf becomes large and the bay is a favorite surfing location.

== History ==
The wetlands of Hanalei Bay were used to grow taro by ancient Hawaiians. By the 1860s, the new crop was rice, which was shipped to Honolulu to become the second largest export crop of the islands. The Hanalei Pier was built to help Hanalei farmers move their crops to market. The covered pier's location near the mouth of the Hanalei River and Black Pot beach has long been a favorite family gathering place for fishing, picnicking, swimming, and playing.

On April 5, 1824, King Kamehameha II's royal yacht, Pride of Hawaii, sank near the mouth of the Waiʻoli River, 22°12′14″N 159°30′37″W, on the southwest corner of the bay after its crew struck a 5-foot-deep (1.5 m) reef a hundred yards offshore. It is believed the captain and crew were drunk at the time. A large section of the ship's hull washed ashore in 1844 in a winter storm surge, but most of this historic wreck remains buried in silt in the bay. In 1995–2000, archaeologists from the Smithsonian Institution's National Museum of American History excavated the wreck and recovered more than 1,200 artifacts. During this excavation, a 40-foot (12 m) section of the stern was discovered, documented, and then re-buried where it was discovered.

The Waiʻoli mission at the southwest included a school and church since the 1830s.

Japanese author Haruki Murakami wrote a short story entitled "Hanalei Bay" set in the area. The story is included in the collection Blind Willow, Sleeping Woman. Hanalei Bay also served as a filming location for the 1958 film South Pacific and for the 2011 film The Descendants.

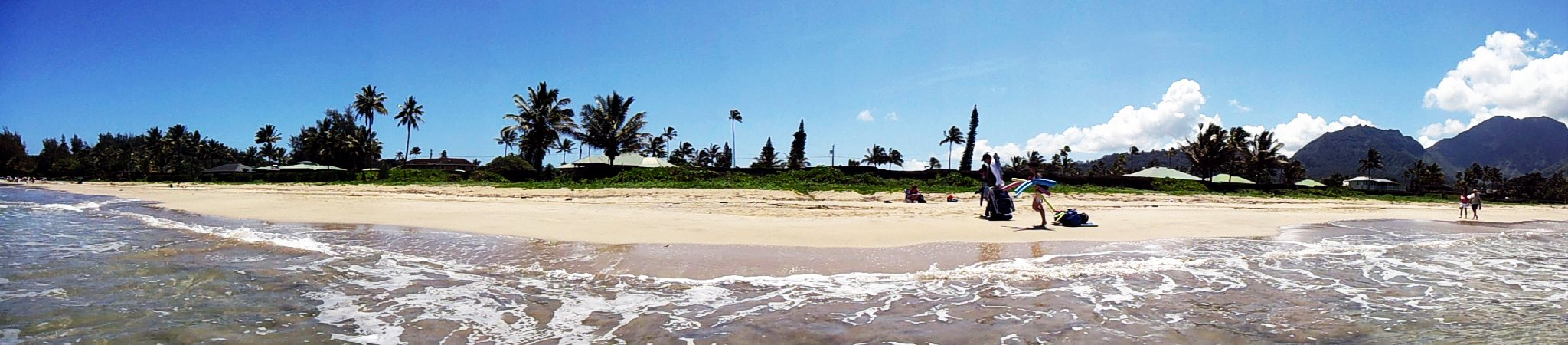
A panoramic shot of the bay
