= Hanalei National Wildlife Refuge =

Wetlands in Kauaʻi, Hawaiʻi, U.S.

- IUCN category IV (habitat/species management area)
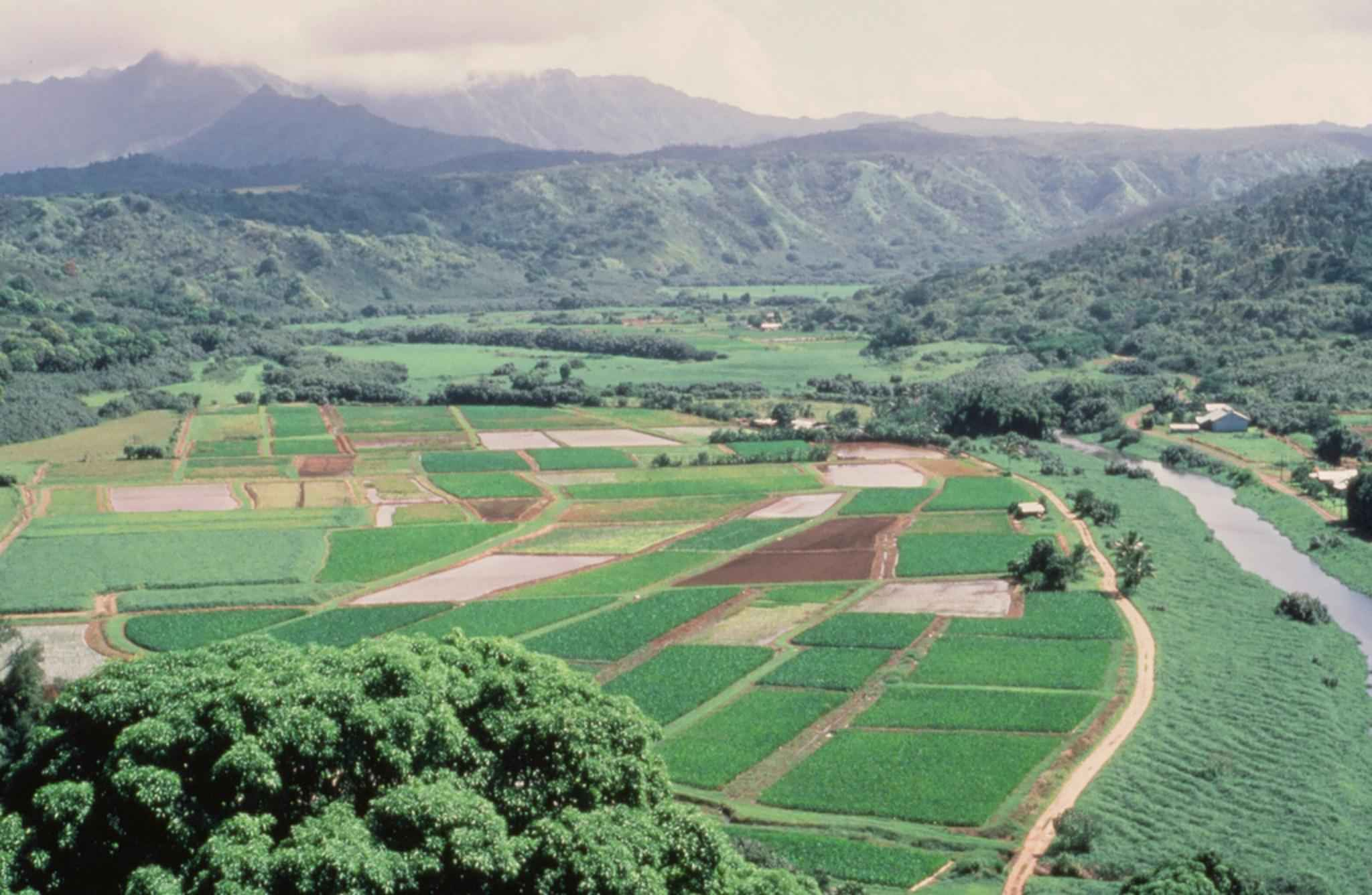

- Location within Hawaii
- Location: Kauaʻi, Hawaiʻi, United States
- Nearest city: Princeville, Hawaii
- Coordinates: 22.20277°N 159.47305°W
- Area: 917 acres (3.71 km^{2})
- Established: 1972
- Governing body: U.S. Fish and Wildlife Service
- Website: Hanalei National Wildlife Refuge

The Hanalei National Wildlife Refuge is a National Wildlife Refuge on the island of Kauaʻi in Hawaiʻi. It is located within the Hanalei River Valley along the island's northern shore. The Refuge was established on 30 November 1972 for the conservation of endangered plants and animals, especially the Hawaiian stilt, Hawaiian coot, Hawaiian gallinule and Hawaiian duck.

== Geography ==
The Refuge is a relatively flat river valley ranging from 20 to 40 ft (6.1 to 12.2 m) above sea level and is surrounded by steep wooded hillsides up to 1,000 ft (300 m) high. The average annual temperature is approximately 73 °F (23 °C), and annual rainfall usually exceeds 75 in (190 cm). At the southeastern end of the Refuge, water from the Hanalei River is diverted into an east and west supply ditch. It then flows northwest and irrigates approximately 186 acres (75 ha) of taro and 84 acres (34 ha) of wildlife impoundments before returning to the river. The Refuge encompasses a total area of approximately 917 acres (371 ha).

== Wildlife ==
The Refuge hosts five endangered waterbirds, the āeʻo (Hawaiian stilt, Himantopus mexicanus knudseni), ʻalae kea (Hawaiian coot, Fulica alai), ʻalae ʻula (Hawaiian moorhen, Gallinula chloropus sandvicensis), koloa maoli (Hawaiian duck, Anas wyvilliana), and nēnē (Hawaiian goose, Branta sandvicensis), as well as 18 other introduced bird species.

== Public use ==
Refuge wetlands are closed to the public to protect the endangered waterbirds and taro crops. Limited access is allowed along a county river road. There are interpretive panels located at the Hanalei Valley overlook, across from the Princeville Shopping Center. A new overlook/visitor center is planned for an area adjacent to the refuge near the existing rudimentary overlook.

Hanalei National Wildlife Refuge includes the Hoʻopulapula Haraguchi Rice Mill, which is on the National Register of Historic Places. A nonprofit association conducts historic and environmental education activities for local school groups and visitors under a Special Use Permit.
