= Hanalei River =

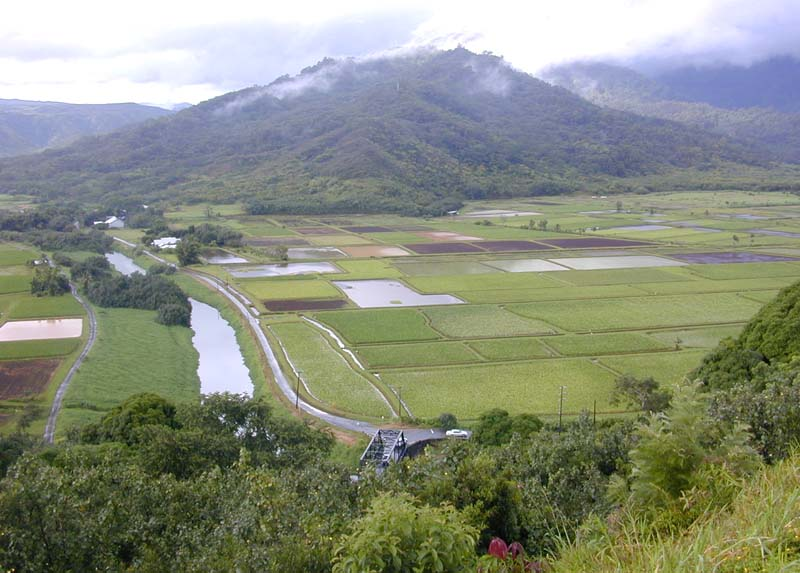
- Lower Hanalei Valley as seen from the overlook near Princeville. Hanalei (town) is to the right.

- Location of mouth

Location
- Country: United States
- State: Hawaii
- Region: Kauai

Physical characteristics
- Source: Mount Waiʻaleʻale
  - coordinates: 22°04′32″N 159°29′34″W
- Mouth: Pacific Ocean
  - location: Hanalei Bay
  - coordinates: 22°13′04″N 159°30′03″W
- Length: 26.5 km (16.5 mi)
- Basin size: 57 km^{2} (22 sq mi)
- Discharge
  - average: 216 cu ft/s (6.1 m^{3}/s)

The Hanalei River on the island of Kauaʻi in Hawaii flows north from the eastern slopes of Mount Waiʻaleʻale for 26.5 km (16.5 mi) until it reaches the Pacific Ocean at Hanalei Bay as an estuary. With a long-term mean discharge of 216 cubic feet (6.12 cubic meters) per second, in terms of water flow it is the second-largest river in the state; although its watershed of 57 square kilometres (22 sq mi) is only sixth-largest on Kauaʻi, it encompasses areas of the highest recorded rainfall on the planet and plunges precipitously from its headwaters at 3,500 feet (1,100 m) above sea level.

The lower, flatter portion of the river flows by Hanalei National Wildlife Refuge and many taro farms (60% of Hawaii's taro is grown in this area). The Hanalei River provides habitat for a number of amphidromous species, including gobies (5 native varieties), two native species of crustacean, the hīhīwai (Neritina granosa, an edible snail), and in its upper reaches, a threatened species of highly adapted snail (Newcomb's snail, Erinna newcombi).

The Hanalei was designated an American Heritage River by US President Bill Clinton on July 30, 1998. The major bridge across the river (still one lane) is on Hawaii Route 560, which is listed on the National Register of Historic Places listings in Hawaii.

== See also ==
- Hanalei, Hawaii
- List of rivers in Hawaii
