= Alexander & Baldwin Sugar Museum =

Sugar museum in Maui, Hawaii

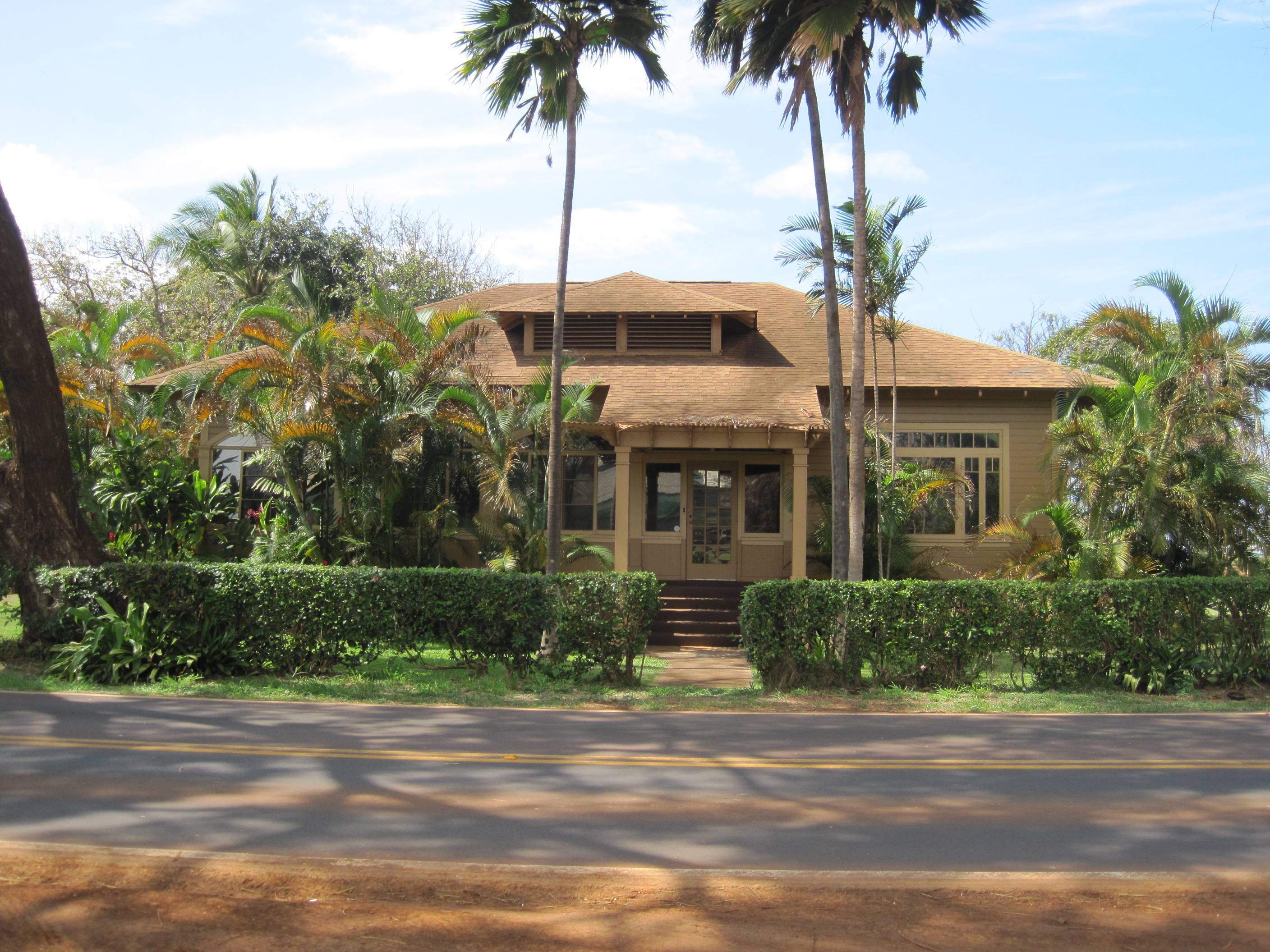
Alexander & Baldwin Sugar Museum in the former Puʻunēnē Mill manager's house

Alexander & Baldwin Sugar Museum is located in the small sugarcane growing and milling community of Puʻunene, Hawaii, Kahului, Maui. The museum exhibits the history of Hawaiian sugarcane plantations and Alexander & Baldwin and its role in the sugarcane industry in Hawaii. The company itself continues in business and though it has diversified, it continues to produce sugarcane. The museum itself in the former mill manager's house.

== History ==
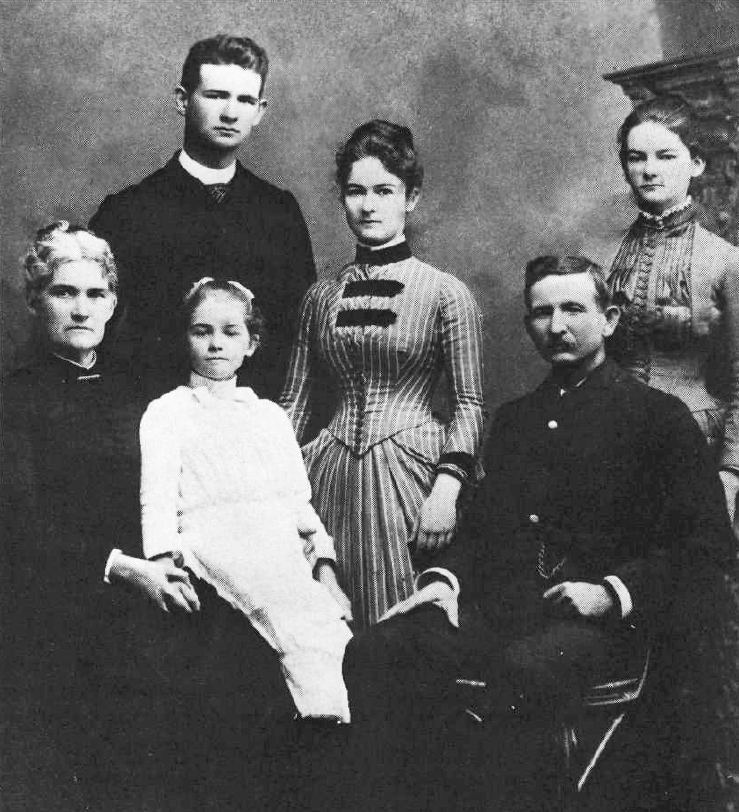
Samuel T. Alexander (1836–1904) and his family in the 1880s

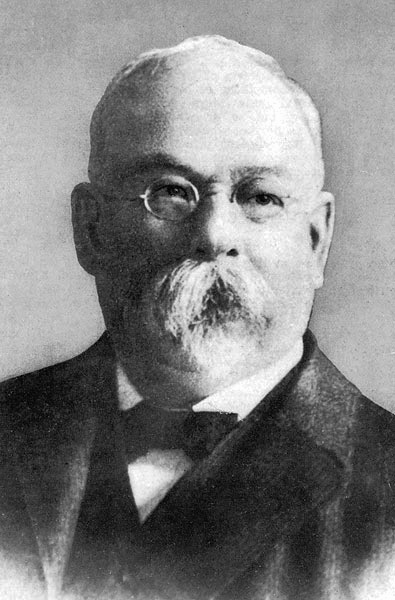
Henry Perrine Baldwin

Samuel Thomas Alexander (1836–1904) was a reverend and co-founder of an agricultural company. He met Dwight Baldwin in Hawaii. Alexander became manager of the Waiheʻe sugar plantation near Wailuku in 1863 and hired Henry Perrine Baldwin (1842–1911) as assistant. In 1870 he formed the Pāʻia plantation under the name Samuel T Alexander & Co. With Baldwin, he purchased 561 acres (227 ha) (2.3 km^{2}) between Pāʻia and Makawao, where they cultivated sugarcane. As of 1871 he also managed the Haʻikū sugar mill which had been constructed in 1861 by Castle & Cooke.

The Reciprocity Treaty of 1875 removed tariffs on sugar exported to the United States. But to raise their production a steady supply of water was needed for the semi-arid dry forests of Pāʻia. Rain was plentiful miles away in the rainforests on the windward slopes of Haleakalā mountain, so Alexander proposed a 17-mile-long (27 km) irrigation aqueduct that diverted water from that part of Haleakalā to their plantation. Alexander knew about irrigation systems used since ancient Hawaii while he was at Lahainaluna, but this was on a much larger scale. He negotiated a lease of water rights from King Kalākaua and raised financing from other partners. It was initially a 20-year lease for $100 per year. His brother James did a survey.

Work started on the aqueduct in 1876 and was completed two years later in 1878 (at over three times the estimated cost), just before a deadline in the lease.

In 1883 the Alexander family moved to Oakland, California, to get medical attention for his father, who died there August 13, 1884.

After completion of the aqueduct, the company grew by selling water to adjacent plantations, and was eventually renamed Alexander & Baldwin Plantation. In 1884 Alexander arranged for the partners to buy the small American Sugar Refinery in California and later organized a group of Hawaiian planters called the Sugar Factors which became the California and Hawaiian Sugar Company (C&H). Between 1872 and 1900, the company took over more land and sugar mill operations. In 1898, Alexander and Baldwin purchased a controlling interest in one of its rival companies, Hawaiian Commercial & Sugar Company (HC&S) from Claus Spreckels. By 1899, the company bought two of Maui's railroad lines. On June 30, 1900, Alexander & Baldwin, Ltd. was incorporated.

Alexander eventually left off running the company and became an adventurer. In 1893 he bicycled through Europe. He traveled through the Pacific Ocean in 1896, including the Marquesas Islands where his parents traveled before he was born, China, and Japan. He also had a winter home on Maui called Olinda, and a summer home in Shasta County, California.

== Growing the business ==
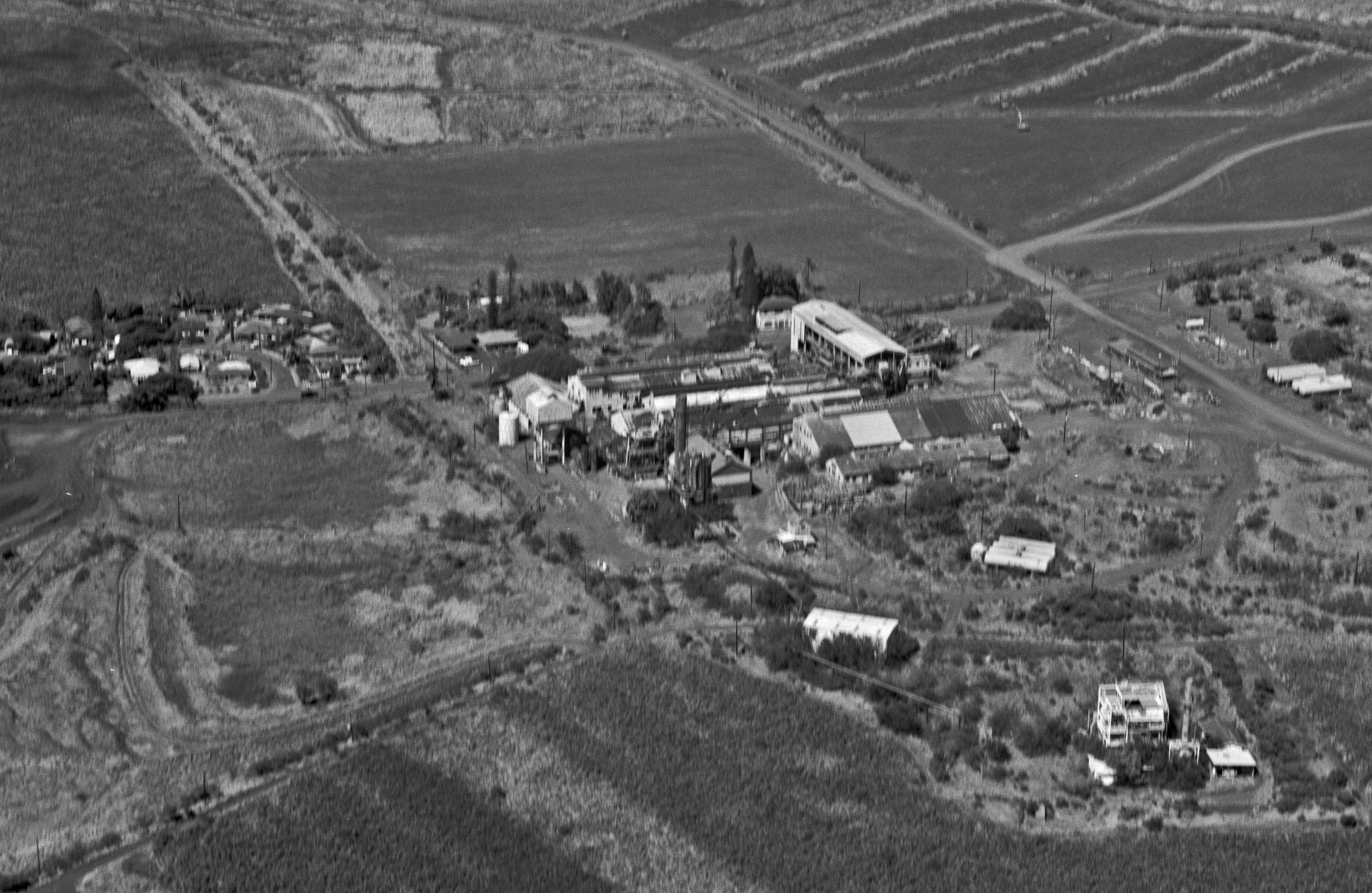
Paiʻia Sugar Mill

The irrigation projects became so profitable that the Alexander and Baldwin partnership was able to buy out other planters and enlarge their holdings. By 1877 Baldwin had the Hamakuapoko Mill built on the southwestern side of Maliko Gulch near the irrigated fields, 20°54′56″N 156°20′53″W. The Haiku mill shut down in 1879. The Paʻia Mill opened in 1880, 20°54′25″N 156°22′32″W In 1881 the Kahului Railroad allowed the sugar to travel by train to the growing port of Kahului.

In 1882 Alexander moved to Oakland, California, and enrolled his children in the schools there before returning in 1883 to become manager of the Haiku plantation. In 1888, Henry Baldwin and a few businessmen from Honolulu formed the Haleakala Ranch, consisting of 33,817 acres (13,685 ha) on the slopes of the dormant volcano Haleakalā. Piʻiholo Ranch is part of that acreage, now used for tourism.

Henry Baldwin hired Louis von Tempsky to manage Haleakala ranch in 1899, and Louis' daughter Armine von Tempski (1892–1943) wrote several novels and an autobiography about life on the Baldwin ranch.

In 1889 the McKinley Tariff act raised tariffs on sugar exported to the U.S. market, and its price dropped to two cents a pound. Baldwin took advantage of the lower land prices and built an irrigation project on Kauaʻi island called the Hanapepe ditch for the Hawaiian Sugar Company. He moved his family to Kauaʻi for a few months before moving back to Maui in 1893.

In 1894 a partnership with Alexander was launched to sell the sugar in California. In 1900, the partnership became officially incorporated as Alexander & Baldwin (A&B). With offices in both Honolulu and San Francisco, it acted as an agent for other plantations as well. Eventually A&B would evolve into a holding company for many other ventures, including shipping line Matson Navigation Company.

In 1899, Baldwin supervised another irrigation project at Kihei. In 1903 he built another house called Maluhia at a higher elevation near Olinda, Hawaii surrounded by fruit trees. Keahua Ranch Company in 1909 became the Maui Pineapple Company. In 1905, he became an owner of The Maui News. His descendants continued to own the paper until 2000.

=== Legacy ===
Alexander & Baldwin became one of the "Big Five" corporations that dominated the economy of the Territory of Hawaii. A&B is listed on the New York Stock Exchange and was added as part of the Dow Jones Transportation Average after purchasing Matson Navigation Company. It continues to produce sugar and operates a museum on Maui.

He also had heirs. and died November 22, 1939.

== Family tree ==
Alexander & Baldwin family tree

William P. Alexander (1805–1884)	Mary Ann McKinney (1810–1888)	Amos Starr Cooke (1810–1871)	Juliette Montague (1812–1896)	Dwight Baldwin (1798–1886)	Charlotte Fowler (1805–1873)	J. W. Smith (1810–1887
David Dwight Baldwin (1831–1912)	W. O. Smith (1848–1929)
William D. Alexander (1833–1913)	Abigail Baldwin (1847–1912)	Samuel T. Alexander (1836–1904)	Martha Eliza Cooke	Ann Elizabeth Alexander (1843–1940)	Henry P. Baldwin (1842–1911)	Emily Whitney Alexander (1846–1943)
Agnes Alexander (1875–1971)	Annie Montague Alexander (1867–1950)	C.W. Dickey (1871–1942)	Belle Dickey (1880–1972)	James Dole (1877–1958)	Henry Alexander Baldwin (1871–1946)	Ethel Frances Smith (1879–1967)
J. Walter Cameron (1895–1976)	Francis Baldwin (1904–1996)
Colin C. Cameron (1927–1992) (Kapalua)

== See also ==
- Hawaiian cuisine
- David Dwight Baldwin
- Grove Farm Sugar Plantation Museum
- Museum of Sugar, Brazil
- List of museums in Hawaii

== Website ==
- Alexander & Baldwin Sugar Museum website

20.8693°N 156.4551°W
