= Charlotte Fowler Baldwin =

American missionary (1805–1873)

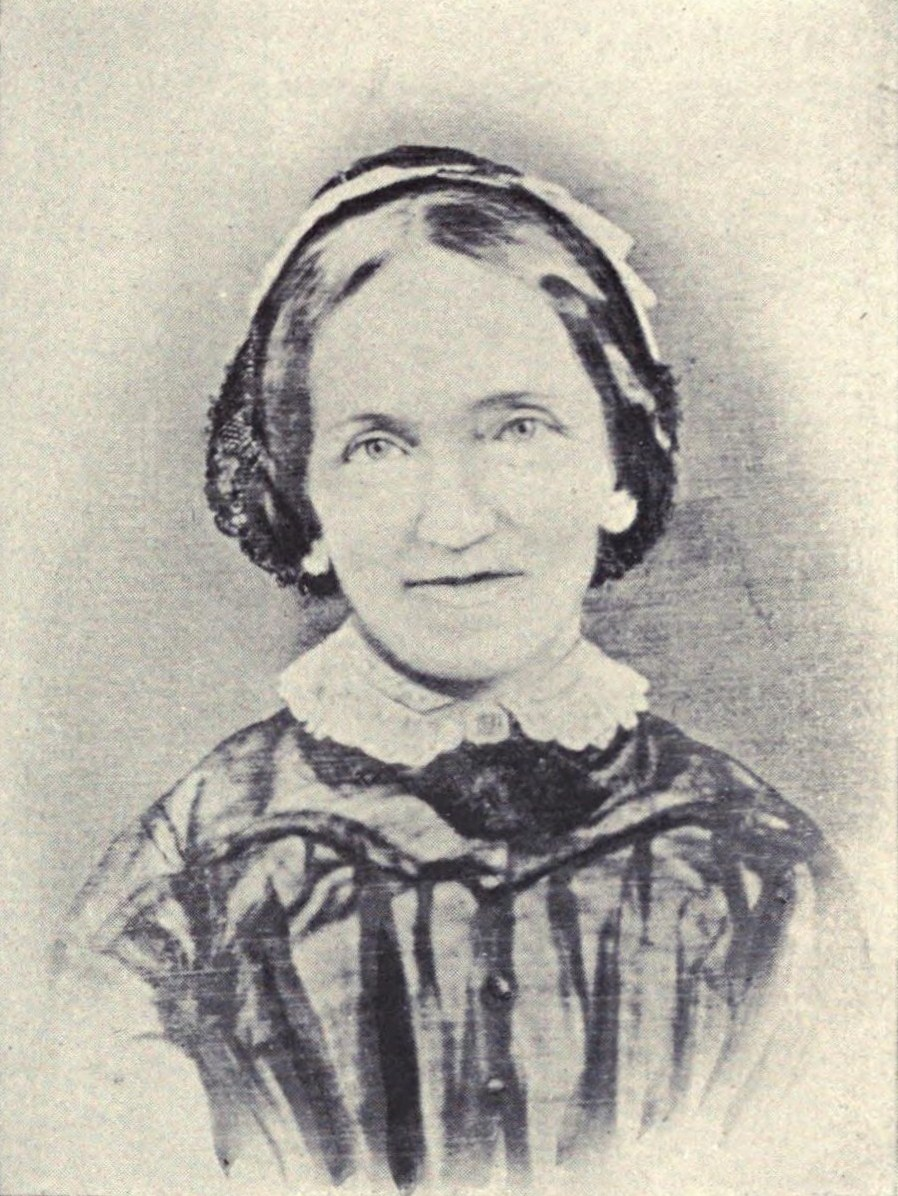
- Born: November 7, 1805; Northford, Connecticut, U.S.
- Died: October 2, 1873 (aged 67)
- Occupation: Missionary
- Spouse: Dwight Baldwin (m. 1830)
- Children: 8, including David Dwight Baldwin and Henry Perrine Baldwin
- Relatives: William DeWitt Alexander (son-in-law); Samuel Mills Damon (son-in-law); Benjamin Douglas (first cousin); William Douglas (grandfather); Jared Mansfield (great-uncle)

Charlotte Fowler Baldwin (November 7, 1805 – October 2, 1873) was an American missionary. She was a member of the Fourth Company of missionaries sent to the Hawaiian Islands by the American Board of Commissioners for Foreign Missions.

== Early life ==
Charlotte Fowler was born in Northford, Connecticut, the daughter of Solomon Fowler and Olive Douglas Fowler. Her grandfather was William Douglas, a colonel in the Connecticut State Regiment during the American Revolutionary War; her mother's uncle was surveyor Jared Mansfield. Inventor and abolitionist Benjamin Douglas was her first cousin. She was educated in New Haven, Connecticut.

== Career ==
Charlotte Fowler taught school in New Jersey as a young woman. She arrived in Hawaii in 1831, with her new husband, a medical missionary; they were members of the Fourth Company of missionaries sent by the American Board of Commissioners for Foreign Missions. The couple were first sent to Waimea and then based at Lahaina on the island of Maui to work with the Waineʻe Church there. Her husband worked on preventing and managing epidemics of smallpox, dysentery, influenza, and more, and later taught at a theological seminary at Honolulu. Charlotte Baldwin, meanwhile, started schools on Maui and at Honolulu; at one point she was teaching about sixty Hawaiian girls in her school. She also led knitting classes, Bible studies, and prayer groups for women at her home.

== Personal life ==
Charlotte Fowler married Dwight Baldwin in 1830. They had eight children together, all born in Hawaii. Six survived her, among them malacologist David Dwight Baldwin and businessman Henry Perrine Baldwin. Her sons-in-law included Samuel Mills Damon and William DeWitt Alexander. Charlotte Fowler Baldwin died at Punahou in 1873, aged 68 years, after a long illness. Her grave is in Kawaiahaʻo Church cemetery.

== Legacy ==
Baldwin's grandson Henry Alexander Baldwin and granddaughter Agnes Baldwin Alexander were among her many descendants. Charlotte Fowler Baldwin's home at Puunene is now the site of the Alexander & Baldwin Sugar Museum. In 1991, Charlotte Fowler Baldwin's rocking chair was donated by her descendants to the Baldwin Home Museum in Lahaina, the oldest standing house on Maui.

== Family tree ==
Alexander & Baldwin family tree

William P. Alexander (1805–1884)	Mary Ann McKinney (1810–1888)	Amos Starr Cooke (1810–1871)	Juliette Montague (1812–1896)	Dwight Baldwin (1798–1886)	Charlotte Fowler (1805–1873)	J. W. Smith (1810–1887
David Dwight Baldwin (1831–1912)	W. O. Smith (1848–1929)
William D. Alexander (1833–1913)	Abigail Baldwin (1847–1912)	Samuel T. Alexander (1836–1904)	Martha Eliza Cooke	Ann Elizabeth Alexander (1843–1940)	Henry P. Baldwin (1842–1911)	Emily Whitney Alexander (1846–1943)
Agnes Alexander (1875–1971)	Annie Montague Alexander (1867–1950)	C.W. Dickey (1871–1942)	Belle Dickey (1880–1972)	James Dole (1877–1958)	Henry Alexander Baldwin (1871–1946)	Ethel Frances Smith (1879–1967)
J. Walter Cameron (1895–1976)	Francis Baldwin (1904–1996)
Colin C. Cameron (1927–1992) (Kapalua)
