= Sugar Museum =

Sugar Museum may refer to several institutions, including:

- Sugar Museum (Berlin) in Berlin, Germany
- Alexander & Baldwin Sugar Museum in Puʻunene, Hawaii
- Museum of Brown Sugar, a former museum in Recife, Brazil
- Sugar Museum in Nakskov, Denmark
- Redpath Sugar Museum at Redpath Sugar Refinery in Toronto, Canada
- Taiwan Sugar Museum in Kaohsiung
- Sugar Museum in Tienen, Belgium
- Australian Sugar Industry Museum in Mourilyan, Queensland
- Barley Sugar Museum in Moret-sur-Loing, France
