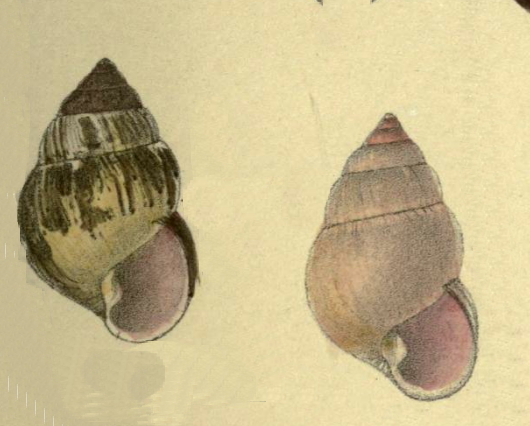
- Shell of Amastra rubristoma

Scientific classification
- Kingdom: Animalia
- Phylum: Mollusca
- Class: Gastropoda
- Order: Stylommatophora
- Family: Amastridae
- Genus: Amastra
- Species: A. rubristoma

Binomial name
- Amastra rubristoma Baldwin, 1906

Synonyms
- Amastra (Amastrella) rubristoma Baldwin, 1896 alternative representation

= Amastra rubristoma =

Species of mollusc

Amastra rubristoma is a species of air-breathing land snail, a terrestrial pulmonate gastropod mollusc in the family Amastridae.

== Description ==
The length of the shell attains 19.12 mm, its diameter 12 mm

The shell is dextral, imperforate, solid, and elongately ovate-conic, with an acute apex. The surface is marked by irregular growth striae, and the nuclear whorls are delicately radiately sulcated. Its coloration varies from reddish-brown to almost white, with darker upper whorls, often covered by a dark, fugacious epidermis. There are seven convex whorls with a well-impressed suture.

The aperture is slightly oblique and oval, with a red interior that occasionally appears livid-white. The peristome is acute and subtly thickened within. The columella ends in a strong, arched, lamellar plait, faintly tinged with red.

== Distribution ==
This species is endemic to Hawaii, occurring on the main island at Hilo.
