= Maui Land & Pineapple Company =

Major Maui, Hawaii real estate enterprise

- Traded as: NYSE: MLP; Russell 2000 Index component
- Founded: 1909
- Headquarters: Kapalua, Hawaii
- Area served: United States
- Products: pineapple
- Website: www.mauiland.com

Maui Land & Pineapple Company, Inc. (ML&P, NYSE: MLP) is a land holding and operating company founded in 1909 and based in Kapalua, Hawaii, United States. It owns approximately 24,300 acres (100 km^{2}) on the island of Maui. It develops, sells, and manages residential, resort, commercial and industrial real estate; and operates retail and utility operations at the Kapalua Resort. ML&P also owns and manages the 8,304-acre (33.61 km^{2}) Puʻu Kukui Watershed Preserve, one of the largest private nature preserves in the state of Hawaii. It formerly grew pineapples.

== Organization ==
Maui Land & Pineapple Company was structured into three operating segments, but re-organized into two at the end of 2009 (with the closure of the pineapple business). The Resort segment includes the operation of the golf and vacation resort community, Kapalua Resort, and is managed through the Kapalua Land Company. The Community Development segment involves management of all the company's real estate development, construction, entitlements, sales and leasing activities as well as the operation of Kapalua Realty, a general brokerage real estate company, located in Kapalua Resort.

=== Kapalua Land Company ===
Kapalua Land Company, Ltd. (KLC) operates the Kapalua Resort of 1,650 acres (6.7 km^{2}), along with the development and sale of real estate on the resort. KLC was established in 1975 and manages resort holdings of over 800 residences, homesites and condominiums, golf courses, tennis courts, a spa, retail and pro shops. Kapalua Resort hosts the PGA Tour’s season-opening Hyundai Tournament every January.

=== Real estate ===
The Community Development division manages and develops ML&P’s land holdings. This includes the company’s real estate development, construction, entitlements, sales and leasing activities as well as the operation of Kapalua Realty and Kapalua Water Company, a Public Utilities Commission-regulated water system and sewage transmission operations that services Kapalua Resort in West Maui.

ML&P’s projects are focused on the luxury real estate market within the Kapalua Resort. This includes completed projects of Honolua Village Center, Kapalua Coastal Trail, Kapalua Spa and The Ritz-Carlton Club and Residences at Kapalua Bay. The Community Development division is also planning the affordable and moderately priced residential and mixed use communities of Pulelehua in West Maui and the expansion of Haliʻimaile in the "Upcountry" area of Maui known as Kula.

=== Maui Pineapple Company ===
Maui Pineapple Company Logo

Maui Pineapple Company, Ltd. (MPC) was the United States' largest grower of Hawaiian pineapples. MPC began in 1909 as the Keahua Ranch Company, Ltd, and became the Maui Pineapple Company in 1932 . MPC cultivated and processed approximately 2,000 acres (8.1 km^{2}) of a hybrid variety of pineapple known as "Maui Gold." It operated Kapalua Farms, located near Kapalua Resort, which cultivated Kapalua Gold and Kapalua Emerald organic pineapples and Kapalua Natural transitional pineapples. Kapalua Farms operated Pineapple Farm Tours in West Maui and managed an organic diversified farming operation. The Maui Pineapple Company closed in 2009. The Hali‘imaile Pineapple Company, a locally owned and operated successor to the Maui Pineapple Company, continues cultivation of 1,350 acres on the slopes of Haleakala.

The company owned a multi-purpose processing facility in Kahului, Maui, where its fresh fruit packing and processing operations were consolidated. The facility also provided refrigerated storage, freight consolidation and warehousing to the greater Maui farming and agricultural community. Maui Pineapple Company's headquarters were located in Kahului, Maui with a satellite division, Kapalua Farms, located near Kapalua Resort, which was also owned by its parent company.

==== Maui Gold Pineapple Varietal Farming & Sales ====
The "Maui Gold" varietal of pineapple was introduced to the market by MPC in 2005. It is naturally sweet with a low acid content. Neither MPC nor ML&P grow or sell any pineapple, and the Maui Gold varietal of pineapple has been grown and sold exclusively by the Hali'imaile Pineapple Company DBA Maui Gold Pineapple Company since 2010. The Maui Gold varietal of pineapple is sold in Hawaii, and is also sold in the mainland United States and Canada, primarily via online direct to consumer sales by the Maui Pineapple Store, which has no affiliation with ML&P.

==== Hawaiian pineapple agriculture ====
Maui Pineapple Company used field rotation, cover crop, and fallow time to manage sustainable agriculture. MPC fields were being evaluated for diversified crops, including taro and other tropical crops. The company used an Integrated Pest Management (IPM) system to reduce pesticides.

== History ==
Company history started in 1903 with Henry Perrine Baldwin and David Dwight Baldwin, sons of medical missionary Rev. Dwight Baldwin. The family acquired land in East and West Maui, and over the next 100 years, they began ranching and their primary business of cultivating pineapples. The family expanded their land holdings, owning 22,600 acres (91 km^{2}) of land on Maui island by 1933.

In 1962, it merged with Baldwin Packers. In 1969, Maui Land & Pineapple Company, Inc. was created by combining Alexander & Baldwin and J. Walter Cameron family holdings and went public, the Maui Pineapple Company, Ltd. being a subsidiary devoted to agricultural operations. Colin Campbell Cameron, a fifth-generation descendant of the Baldwin family, became its first president and CEO until his death in 1992. Harry Weinberg became an investor, but the Cameron family prevented him from getting a board seat.

In 1975 ML&P incorporated Kapalua Land Company, Ltd. as its subsidiary dedicated to resort development. Maui Pineapple Company, Ltd. was established as its subsidiary devoted to pineapple and other agricultural operations. In 1975 the company opened its first golf course. Two other golf courses, homes, luxury condos, and another hotel (The Ritz-Carlton, Kapalua) followed over the next two decades. In 1978, ML&P dedicated 3,307 acres (13.38 km^{2}) of coastal land to establish the Honolua-Mokule'ia Marine Life Conservation District. In 1988, ML&P committed 8,304 acres (33.61 km^{2}) of its West Maui land, including Puʻu Kukui, the summit of the West Maui mountain range, to conservation. This area eventually became the Puʻu Kukui Watershed Preserve, one of the largest private nature preserves in Hawaii. In 1989 hundreds of remains of ancient Hawaiians were discovered when excavating for a new hotel.

Colin Cameron's son Richard Cameron (born circa 1955) served as executive and chairman when the pineapple cannery (the last in the United States) shut down, and only fresh fruit was marketed. When Weinberg died and the Harry and Jeanette Weinberg Foundation inherited his stock shares, lawyer Daniel H. Case arranged a sale of the shares to keep the company intact. Gary L. Gifford announced he would resign May 27, 2003, and was temporarily replaced by Donald Young. A shopping center in Kahului was sold later that year.

Former AOL executive Steve Case (Daniel Case's son) became an investor in 1999 buying the former Weinberg stake. Richard Cameron resigned as chairman, and stepped down as director in 2005. Cole started an ambitious expansion program for the resort. The original Kapalua Bay Hotel was torn down in 2006, and replaced by a "club" with memberships reportedly sold for $375,000. After rising fuel costs, a real estate price drop, and reduced tourism caused losses, layoffs were announced in 2008. Case joined the board in 2008 and Cole left at the end of that year.

On December 31, 2009, MPC ceased pineapple operations after 97 years. The move briefly put Maui out of the pineapple business, and left only a small pineapple operation run by Dole Food Company on Oʻahu growing one of Hawaii's signature crops. A group of former Maui Pineapple Company executives and local investors assumed pineapple operations on January 1, 2010. The new company, Haliʻimaile Pineapple Company, Ltd. (HPC), continued to grow and market fresh pineapple under the Maui Gold Brand to the Hawaii market. HPC purchased and licensed key assets, and leased farm land, equipment, and buildings from ML&P. The new company kept 65 of the old employees.

The Kapalua Farms organic pineapple operation was taken over by Ulupono Sustainable Agriculture Development, backed by investor Pierre Omidyar in early 2010.

In July and August 2010 Case increased his holdings in the company to over 60%, as the company retired some debt. In 2009 the Plantation golf course at Kapalua was sold to TY Management Corporation, and in September 2010 the Kapalua Bay course was sold to the same investors.

== Family tree ==
Alexander & Baldwin family tree

William P. Alexander (1805–1884)	Mary Ann McKinney (1810–1888)	Amos Starr Cooke (1810–1871)	Juliette Montague (1812–1896)	Dwight Baldwin (1798–1886)	Charlotte Fowler (1805–1873)	J. W. Smith (1810–1887
David Dwight Baldwin (1831–1912)	W. O. Smith (1848–1929)
William D. Alexander (1833–1913)	Abigail Baldwin (1847–1912)	Samuel T. Alexander (1836–1904)	Martha Eliza Cooke	Ann Elizabeth Alexander (1843–1940)	Henry P. Baldwin (1842–1911)	Emily Whitney Alexander (1846–1943)
Agnes Alexander (1875–1971)	Annie Montague Alexander (1867–1950)	C.W. Dickey (1871–1942)	Belle Dickey (1880–1972)	James Dole (1877–1958)	Henry Alexander Baldwin (1871–1946)	Ethel Frances Smith (1879–1967)
J. Walter Cameron (1895–1976)	Francis Baldwin (1904–1996)
Colin C. Cameron (1927–1992) (Kapalua)
