= Samuel Mills Damon =

American politician and businessman (1845–1924)

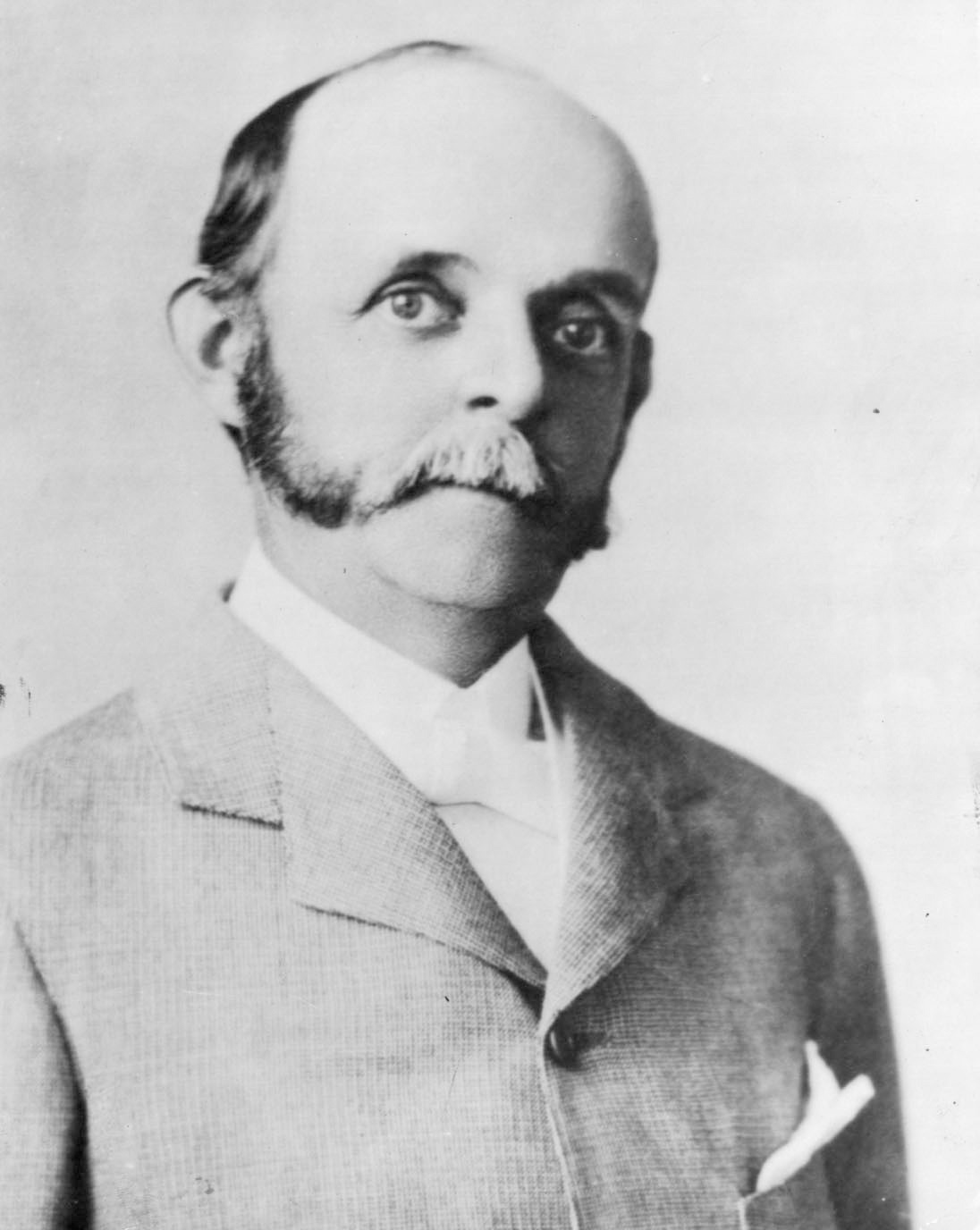

Minister of Finance
- In office July 22, 1889 – June 17, 1890
- Monarch: Kalākaua
- Preceded by: William Lowthian Green
- In office May 29, 1893 – September 12, 1896
- Succeeded by: James A. King
- In office August 11, 1897 – November 13, 1899
- Succeeded by: Henry E. Cooper
- In office December 21, 1899 – June 14, 1900

Personal details
- Born: March 13, 1845 Honolulu
- Died: July 1, 1924 (aged 79)
- Spouse: Harriet Melinda Baldwin
- Children: 4
- Occupation: Businessman, Politician

Samuel Mills Damon (March 13, 1845 – July 1, 1924) was a businessman and politician in the Kingdom of Hawaii, through the Republic of Hawaii and into the Territory of Hawaii.

== Life ==
Damon was born in Honolulu on March 13, 1845. His father was early missionary Samuel Chenery Damon (1815–1885) and his mother was Julia Sherman Mills (1817–1890). They arrived in Honolulu in 1842. His maternal great-uncle was minister Samuel John Mills (1783–1818), who took part in the Haystack Prayer Meeting which led to the formation of the American Board of Commissioners for Foreign Missions, the group that sent the first American missionaries to Hawaii.

He was educated at Punahou School from 1856 to 1863. On September 5, 1872, he married Harriet Melinda Baldwin (1846–1932), daughter of missionary Dwight Baldwin (1798–1886).

=== Family and business ===
The Damons had four children: Samuel Edward Damon (born June 1, 1873), Mary Mills Damon (born November 23, 1877), Henry Fowler Damon (born January 16, 1883) and Douglas Wilfred Damon. His wife's brother Henry Perrine Baldwin (1842–1911) founded Alexander & Baldwin. This was one of the "Big Five" corporations that dominated the economy of territorial Hawaii.

Damon started work as a clerk in the W. N. Ladd store in Honolulu, run by the son of the founder of ill-fated Ladd & Co. In 1871 he went to work for the bank of Charles Reed Bishop, the only one in the Hawaiian Islands at the time. By 1881 he became a full partner in Bishop's bank. He invested in and served on the board of directors of sugarcane plantations and the Oahu Railway and Land Company, and was vice president of his brother-in-law's Hawaiian Sugar Company.

In 1884, he inherited over 9,000 acres (3,600 ha) of the area known as Moanalua from Bernice Pauahi Bishop. She was the wife of his business partner, and a Hawaiian princess who inherited the land from King Kamehameha I. Damon was executor of Princess Pauahi's will, and trustee of the estate through 1916. Most of her land went to fund the Kamehameha Schools. He successfully appealed a lawsuit to the supreme court to demand exclusive fishing rights to the area offshore of Moanalua.

In an even more unusual case, Charles Brenig, who had come to Hawaii under the name Simeon Weibert, died and left much of his estate to Damon. The will was contested by Brenig's widow and son, but appeals were denied.

When Bishop moved to San Francisco in 1893 Damon acquired all shares of the Bishop bank. The bank later became the First Hawaiian Bank, and Damon's share was sold to BNP Paribas in 2001.

=== Politics ===
On August 12, 1884, King Kalākaua made Damon a member of the Privy Council, where he served until March 7, 1891. He became a member of the board of education on July 7, 1887, and board of Health December 28, 1887. He was appointed minister of finance on July 22, 1889, replacing amateur geologist and businessman William Lowthian Green. He served until being replaced by Godfrey Brown on June 17, 1890.

He kept on good terms with Queen Liliʻuokalani (his father had performed her wedding ceremony). He was out of town when the Committee of Safety deposed her. Since he knew people on both sides, he helped negotiate a peaceful outcome, where Liliʻuokalani surrendered under protest to the US Government.

After the overthrow of the Kingdom of Hawaii, he was vice president of the Provisional Government of Hawaii from February 4, 1893, to May 29, 1893, when he again became minister of finance. He was also on the executive council of Sanford B. Dole (which replaced the privy council of the monarchy) until May 22, 1895. When it was apparent that the United States was not going to annex the islands immediately, he continued in the Republic of Hawaii government to September 12, 1896. James A. King replaced him temporarily in June 1896. He was made a special envoy to attend the diamond jubilee of Queen Victoria in London. On August 11, 1897, he held the post for a third time, until November 13, 1899. He was Hawaii's last minister of finance, serving once more from December 21, 1899, until June 14, 1900, after the Hawaiian Organic Act established the government of the Territory of Hawaii and the cabinet was abolished.

=== Legacy ===
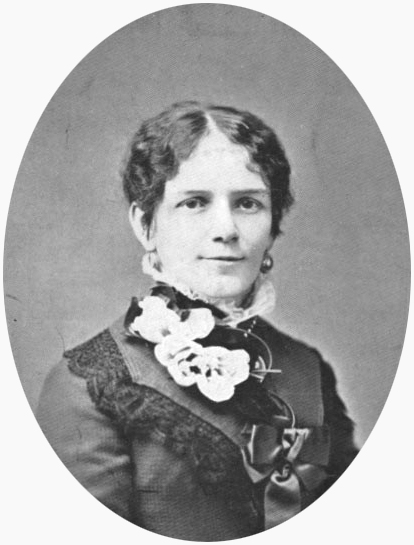
Wife Harriet Melinda Baldwin Damon

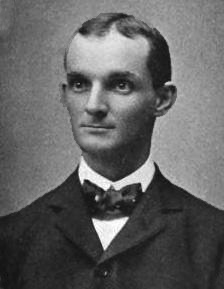
"Ned" Damon died in 1904

His son Samuel Edward "Ned" Damon graduated from Punahou and then Yale. He studied accounting in Glasgow, Scotland, where he married Gertrude Valentine Marr MacKinnon, daughter of William Mackinnon, an accountant at McClelland, Mackinnon & Blyth, and Elisabeth 'Bessie' Kerr Mackinnon née Marr on January 17, 1899. They had four children, although one died young. He returned to work in the family bank, but was stabbed to death on September 27, 1904.

After S. M. Damon died July 1, 1924, his estate (then estimated worth over US$250 million) was left in trust to his grandchildren. At one time it was the fourth largest private landowner in Hawaii. Son Henry Fowler Damon graduated from Yale; he married his brother Samuel's widow Gertrude, they had four children: Harriet Damon "Haku" Baldwin (1913–2003), Frances (Damon) Holt, Joan (Damon) Haig, and Henry E. Damon, and died December 19, 1926. Douglas Wilfred Damon died September 21, 1936.

The property became very valuable as Honolulu was developed in the 20th century. Parts of Moanalua became Fort Kamehameha, Honolulu International Airport, Tripler Army Medical Center, Moanalua High School, the Salt Lake, Hawaii, development, and Moanalua Gardens. In 2003, the office buildings alone were sold to the Real estate investment trust HRPT for over $480 million. Trustees of the estate included retired General Frederick C. Weyand, great-grandson David M. Haig, former bank president Walter Dods, and local attorney Paul Mullin Ganley. His last surviving grandchild, Joan Damon Haig, died on November 9, 2004.

The estate had about 20 beneficiaries with annual total income of over $34 million, as plans were made for its distribution. However, only one grandchild, (Samuel Renny Damon) survived from his son Samuel, while four descended from son Henry. A lawsuit was filed (appealed to the Supreme Court of Hawaii) to determine how to divide the shares: equal shares for each great-grandchild, five shares for each grandchild, or half for each set of descendants by his two children. The 1914 will had almost no punctuation in its ten pages. The US Supreme Court refused to hear the case, so the estate, estimated worth $900 million in 2006, was distributed with half to descendants of each son.

The estate had bought Kahuku Ranch on Hawaiʻi island for $1.3 million in 1958 from James W. Glover. It is located on the southwest rift zone of Mauna Loa volcano, with headquarters at 19°3′17″N 155°41′29″W. The estate sold about 116,000 acres (47,000 ha) of the ranch in 2003 to the US Government (with financing from the Nature Conservancy) to expand Hawaii Volcanoes National Park for $22 million. It was the largest conservation land deal in Hawaii's history, enlarging the park by more than 50%. Some was sold for residences, and some remains as a tourist accommodation. In 2006 Damon's coin collection alone was auctioned off for $3,884,000 by Doyle New York. It included an 1876 proof set from the US centennial. In 2007, the estate donated a collection of artifacts to the Bernice P. Bishop Museum. Damon was a founding trustee of the museum.

== See also ==
- Sugar plantations in Hawaii
- List of Missionaries to Hawaii
- Alexander & Baldwin Sugar Museum

Government offices
Preceded by William Lowthian Green	Kingdom of Hawaii Minister of Finance; July 22, 1889 – June 17, 1890	Succeeded by Godfrey Brown
Preceded by Theodore C. Porter	Republic of Hawaii Minister of Finance; May 29, 1893 – June 3, 1896	Succeeded by James A. King
Preceded by James A. King	Republic of Hawaii Minister of Finance; June 30, 1896 – September 12, 1896	Succeeded by Henry E. Cooper
Preceded by Theodore F. Lansing	Republic of Hawaii Minister of Finance; August 17, 1897 – November 13, 1899	Succeeded by Henry E. Cooper
Preceded by Theodore F. Lansing	Republic of Hawaii Minister of Finance; December 21, 1899 – June 14, 1900	Succeeded by Office abolished
