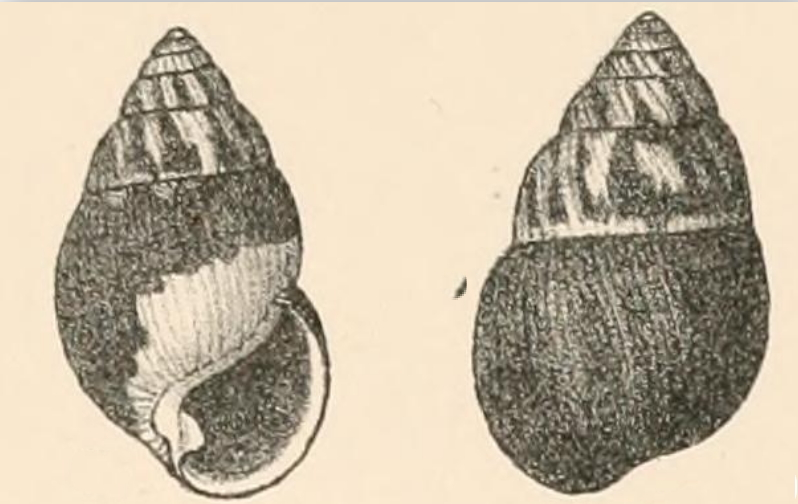
- Shell of Amastra pullata (holotype)

Scientific classification
- Kingdom: Animalia
- Phylum: Mollusca
- Class: Gastropoda
- Order: Stylommatophora
- Family: Amastridae
- Genus: Amastra
- Species: A. pullata

Binomial name
- Amastra pullata (Baldwin, 1895)

Synonyms
- Achatinella (Amastra) pullata Baldwin, 1895 superseded combination; Amastra (Amastra) pullata (Baldwin, 1895) alternative representation

= Amastra pullata =

Species of mollusc

Amastra pullata is a species of air-breathing land snail, a terrestrial pulmonate gastropod mollusc in the family Amastridae.

Subspecies

- Amastra pullata pullata (Baldwin, 1895)
- Amastra pullata subnigra Hyatt & Pilsbry, 1911 (description: Similar to the preceding species but smaller, the upper portion of the spire is purplish-brown. The undercuticle is orange or pale yellow, partially visible beneath a more or less deciduous blackish outer layer)
- Amastra pullata umbrosa (Baldwin, 1895)

== Description ==
The length of the shell attains 23 mm, its diameter 11.5 mm.

(Original description) The shell contains 7 whorls. The shell is dextral, imperforate, and solid, with an elongately ovate shape. Its surface is lusterless, adorned with irregular, closely spaced growth striae, while the whorls of the protoconch are finely and radially sulcated.

The shell's color is light brown, covered by a fugacious black epidermis that is dense on the body whorl but sparser on the upper whorls and worn away near the aperture. The apex is dark brown.

It consists of 7 convex whorls, with a well-impressed suture. The aperture is oval and slightly oblique, white internally with a purplish tint. The peristome is acute, slightly thickened on the inner side, and edged in dark purple. The columella is purplish-white, flexuous, and ends abruptly in a broad, thin, and slightly arched lamellar plait.

When fully extended in motion, the animal is slightly longer than its shell. The mantle is nearly white with a subtle slate-gray tinge. The foot, both above and below, is also nearly white, with the posterior portion and edges densely covered in very fine pink spots, giving these areas a delicate pink hue when viewed under magnification.

The tentacles are short and light slate in color, with a few similarly colored spots on the head. Unlike most species of Amastra, which typically have dark and dingy-colored bodies, this species is notable for its strikingly pale, almost white appearance, lending it a distinctive and beautiful coloration.

== Distribution ==
This species is endemic to Hawaii, occurring on Molokai Island.
