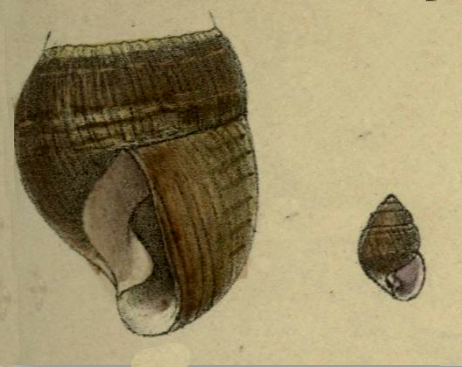
- Shell of Amastra breviata

Scientific classification
- Kingdom: Animalia
- Phylum: Mollusca
- Class: Gastropoda
- Order: Stylommatophora
- Family: Amastridae
- Genus: Amastra
- Species: A. breviata

Binomial name
- Amastra breviata (Baldwin, 1895)

Synonyms
- Amastra (Metamastra) breviata (Baldwin, 1895) alternative representation

= Amastra breviata =

Species of mollusc

Amastra breviata is a species of air-breathing land snail, a terrestrial pulmonate gastropod mollusc in the family Amastridae.

== Description ==
The length of the shell attains 12.5 mm, its diameter 7.5 mm.

(Original description) The shell contains 6 whorls. The shell is dextral, very minutely perforated, rather thin, and globosely conical, with a somewhat acute apex. The surface is unpolished, adorned with fine incremental lines, while the whorls in the protoconch are smooth. The coloration is corneous-brown, lacking an epidermis.

The shell consists of six slightly convex whorls, separated by a well-impressed suture. The aperture is slightly oblique and oval, with a livid-white interior that subtly reflects the shell's exterior color. The peristome is simple and thin, with its extremities connected by a delicate white or brown callosity. The columella is white, flexuous, and ends abruptly in a thin lamellar plait.

(Later supplemental description by Hyatt, A. & Pilsbry, H. A. ) The shell is moderately solid, with a reddish-chestnut coloration, paler below the suture, behind the lip, and around the perforation. It is often adorned with interrupted creamy lines and bands encircling the shell, particularly at and above the periphery. The aperture is flesh-colored on the interior, with the lip showing minimal thickening.

== Distribution ==
This species is endemic to Hawaii, occurring on Oahu Island.
