= Henry Perrine Baldwin =

American businessman and politician

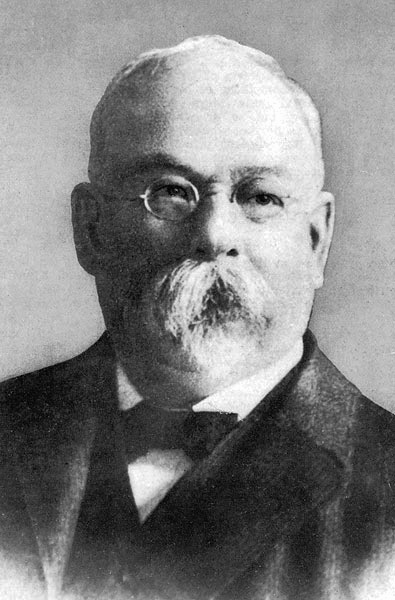
- Born: August 29, 1842; Lahaina, Maui
- Died: July 8, 1911 (aged 68)
- Occupations: Businessman, politician
- Spouse: Emily Whitney Alexander
- Children: 8, including Henry Alexander Baldwin
- Parent(s): Dwight Baldwin; Charlotte Fowler

Henry Perrine Baldwin (August 29, 1842 – July 8, 1911) was an American businessman and politician on Maui in the Hawaiian Islands. He supervised the construction of the East Maui Irrigation System and co-founded Alexander & Baldwin, one of the "Big Five" corporations that dominated the economy of the Territory of Hawaii.

== Life ==
Baldwin was born on August 29, 1842, in Lahaina, Hawaii. His father was American Christian missionary Dwight Baldwin (1798–1886), and his mother was Charlotte Fowler Baldwin. He was named after Matthew LaRue Perrine (1777–1836), professor at Auburn Theological Seminary, from which his father had graduated shortly before his departure to the Hawaiian Islands. He attended Punahou School in Honolulu and returned to Maui to become a farmer. First he tried to manage William DeWitt Alexander's rice plantation, but that failed. Instead by 1863 he went to work for his brother David (also called Dwight Baldwin, Jr) who had started a small sugarcane farm. He hoped to earn enough money to go to medical school, but never left the sugar industry. He took a job as foreman (called luna) of the Waiheʻe plantation, owned by Christopher H. Lewers, under the management of Samuel Thomas Alexander. In 1867, he traveled to the West Coast of the United States.

In 1869, Baldwin and Alexander became business partners and bought 12 acres (49,000 m^{2}) in the eastern Maui ahupuaʻa (ancient land division) called Hāmākua Poko. (This is not to be confused with the Hāmākua district of Hawaiʻi island.) In 1870, they bought another 559 acres (2.26 km^{2}) and planted sugarcane. Baldwin had gone into debt to buy the land.

They lived in an area called "Sunnyside" near the small Paliuli Sugar Mill, which had been built on the edge of Rainbow Gulch 20°53′32″N 156°21′3″W by Robert Hind. Alexander managed the larger Haiku Mill which had been constructed in 1861 by Castle & Cooke, formed by two former missionaries. Alexander had married Martha Eliza Cooke, daughter of Amos Starr Cooke, a co-founder of Castle & Cooke.

On March 28, 1876, Baldwin lost his right arm in an industrial accident at the Paliuli Mill. Trying to adjust the rollers, his fingers got stuck in the cane grinder, pulling in his right arm, and he almost died before it could be turned off and reversed to free him. A worker was sent to get the nearest doctor ten miles (16 km) away to do the amputation. Within weeks, he learned to write with his left hand, and continued to play organ in his church with one hand. In a month, he was riding horseback in his fields.

== Hamakua Ditch ==
The Reciprocity Treaty of 1875 gave freer access to market for sugar exported to the United States. Although the Hawaiian Islands have a 12-month growing season, a major problem with farming former dry forests was their wide extremes in precipitation. After a quick tropical downpour the intense sun can cause enormous growth. But there are often years with little or no rain at all in some places. Baldwin said one day during a drought he knelt down in the field and prayed for rain. It came, and he promised that if he ever became successful, he would make sure he would build a suitable monument.

Alexander was more practical: his father had taught at Lahainaluna School where irrigation ditches had been used for small private gardens since the times of ancient Hawaii. Alexander noticed the rainforests on the eastern (windward) side of the island and upper slopes of Haleakalā received much more rainfall. The terrain in that area was too rough to plant, but they reasoned an aqueduct could bring water to the lower, flatter area of their fields. William Harrison Rice had irrigated a small sugarcane plantation in 1856, but this system would supply 3,000 acres (1,200 ha). Alexander arranged a survey, worked out financing from other planters to create the Hamakua Ditch Company and negotiated a two-year lease with the government of King David Kalākaua to build the project starting September 30, 1876.

With no engineering training, Baldwin supervised what became known as the 17-mile (27 km) Hamakua Ditch while recovering from his injury. Sugar competitor Claus Spreckels had obtained another lease from the Kingdom government, so unless Baldwin completed his system by September 30, 1878, the water would go to Spreckels. Besides actual ditches lined with clay, sluices and siphons were used to cross several steep canyons. Baldwin would lower himself down into the gulches daily with his one remaining arm. Workers doubted that water would go down through a pipe and then go uphill on the other side.

Water started to flow to the Castle & Cooke plantation in July 1877. Crossing Maliko Gulch with the pipeline was the last major milestone, since they could then irrigate their own fields. Alexander left for a trip to Europe on July 9, 1878, and left day-to-day management of Hawaiian operations to Baldwin. The project was over budget, but on-time and worked. Several other projects were added through 1923 to the system.

The idea was copied over the years in projects on Maui and other islands. Irish civil engineer Michael O'Shaughnessy designed the Koolau Ditch in 1904–1905 and some similar projects using technology developed for railroad tunnels. He then returned to San Francisco and applied the idea to the Hetch Hetchy Aqueduct. Alexander and Baldwin consolidated these projects into their East Maui Irrigation Company. The East Maui irrigation system was declared a Historic Civil Engineering Landmark in 2002.

== Growing the business ==
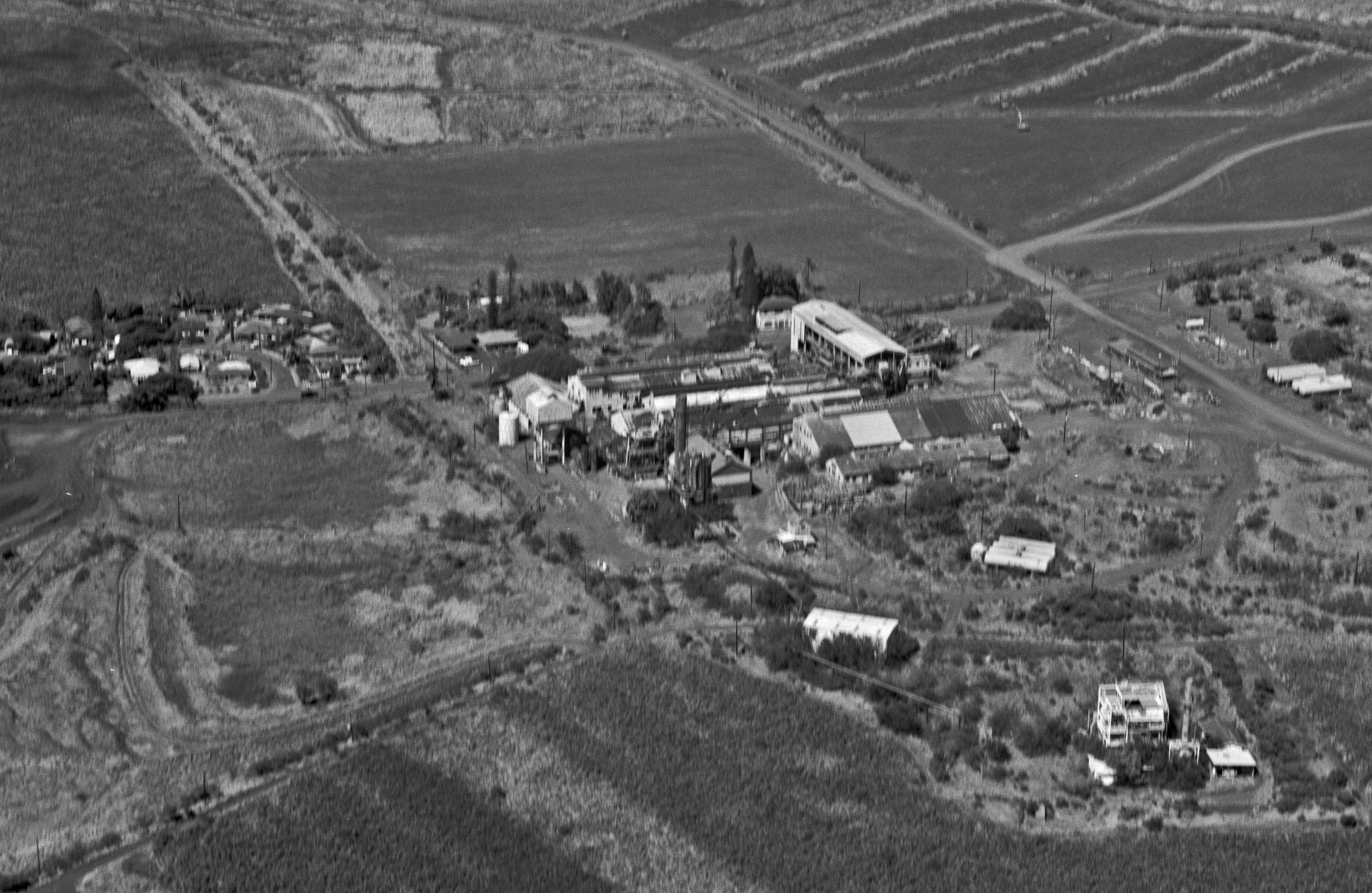
Paiʻia Sugar Mill

The irrigation projects became so profitable that the Alexander and Baldwin partnership was able to buy out other planters and enlarge their holdings. By 1877 Baldwin had the Hamakuapoko Mill built on the southwestern side of Maliko Gulch near the irrigated fields, 20°54′56″N 156°20′53″W. The Haiku mill shut down in 1879. The Paʻia Mill opened in 1880, 20°54′25″N 156°22′32″W In 1881 the Kahului Railroad allowed the sugar to travel by train to the growing port of Kahului. In 1882 Alexander moved to Oakland, California and enrolled his children in the schools there. Baldwin and his family also visited California but returned in 1883 and he became manager of the Haiku plantation. He built another house near the former Haiku mill and started buying shares of the business.

Spreckels used his vast financial resources to bring German Engineer Hermann Schussler to build his own irrigation system from 1878 to 1880, forming the Hawaii Commercial and Sugar Company. Spreckels also controlled the sugar refinery in California used for most Hawaiian sugar. Eventually Spreckels would sell out in 1898 and Baldwin would become a partner, and merge Haiku and Paia sugar companies into it. Baldwin managed HC&S personally from 1902 to 1906.

In 1887 he traveled to England with brother-in-law Samuel Mills Damon to see the Golden Jubilee of Queen Victoria. In 1888 he offered the foundation of the old Paliuli mill to his church, and a wooden frame building was built on the site where he lost his arm — his monument for answering his prayers. He also helped fund restoration of the Waineʻe Church of his father.

In 1888, Henry Baldwin and a few businessmen from Honolulu formed the Haleakala Ranch, consisting of 33,817 acres (13,685 ha) on the slopes of the dormant volcano Haleakalā. Piʻiholo Ranch is part of that acreage, now used for tourism. Henry Baldwin hired Louis von Tempsky to manage Haleakala ranch in 1899, and Louis' daughter Armine von Tempski (1892–1943) wrote several novels and an autobiography about life on the Baldwin ranch.

In 1889 the McKinley Tariff act raised tariffs on sugar exported to the U.S. market, and its price dropped to two cents a pound. Baldwin took advantage of the lower land prices and built an irrigation project on Kauaʻi island called the Hanapepe ditch for the Hawaiian Sugar Company. He moved his family to Kauaʻi for a few months before moving back to Maui in 1893.

In 1894 a partnership with Alexander became agent to sell the sugar in California. In 1900, the partnership became officially incorporated as Alexander & Baldwin (A&B). With offices in both Honolulu and San Francisco, it acted as an agent for other plantations as well. Eventually A&B would evolve into a holding company for many other ventures, including shipping line Matson Navigation Company.

In 1899 he supervised another irrigation project at Kihei. In 1903 he built another house called Maluhia at a higher elevation near Olinda, Hawaii surrounded by fruit trees. Keahua Ranch Company in 1909 became the Maui Pineapple Company.

In 1905, he became an owner of The Maui News. His descendants continued to own the paper until 2000.

== Politics ==
After the 1887 Constitution of the Kingdom of Hawaii raised the property-owning requirements of voters, Henry Perrine Baldwin was elected to the Kingdom House of Nobles from 1887 to 1892, and the Senate of the Republic of Hawaii and Territory of Hawaii 1895–1904. He was a member of the foreign affairs committee, and inherited his father's concern for public health, using his own money to fund better homes in the Kalaupapa Leprosy Settlement. He introduced a bill proposing to outlaw employment of children under 13, but it was defeated. He was a member of the controlling Reform Party, which evolved into the Hawaii Republican Party. He generally opposed the ruling King Kalākaua, but never expressed support for the overthrow of the Kingdom of Hawaii in 1893. He gave the speech nominating Prince Jonah Kūhiō Kalanianaʻole for Congressional delegate in 1902.

== Family and legacy ==
He married Emily Whitney Alexander (1846–1943), sister of his business partner Samuel Alexander, on April 5, 1870. His sister Abigail Charlette Baldwin had married Samuel's brother William DeWitt Alexander (1847–1912) in 1861.

Their first son Henry Alexander Baldwin (1871–1946), known as "Harry", became manager of the Haiku Sugar Company in 1921, which was merged with other plantations to become the Maui Agricultural Company. Harry was very active in politics, including serving as delegate to the United States House of Representatives from the Territory of Hawaii.

Son William Dwight Baldwin was born October 25, 1873, graduated from Yale in 1897, and then Johns Hopkins Medical School in 1901. He returned in 1905 to practice medicine in Honolulu until 1914 when he became a rancher on Maui. He died October 30, 1943.

Arthur Douglas Baldwin was born April 8, 1876, graduated from Yale and then Harvard Law School 1898–1891 He moved to Cleveland, Ohio and practised law in his firm Garfield McGregor & Baldwin. His law partner James Rudolph Garfield was son of President James A. Garfield. He married Reba Louise Williams in 1902 and had five children. He wrote a biography of his father. He became a lieutenant of field artillery in World War I and died in 1954.

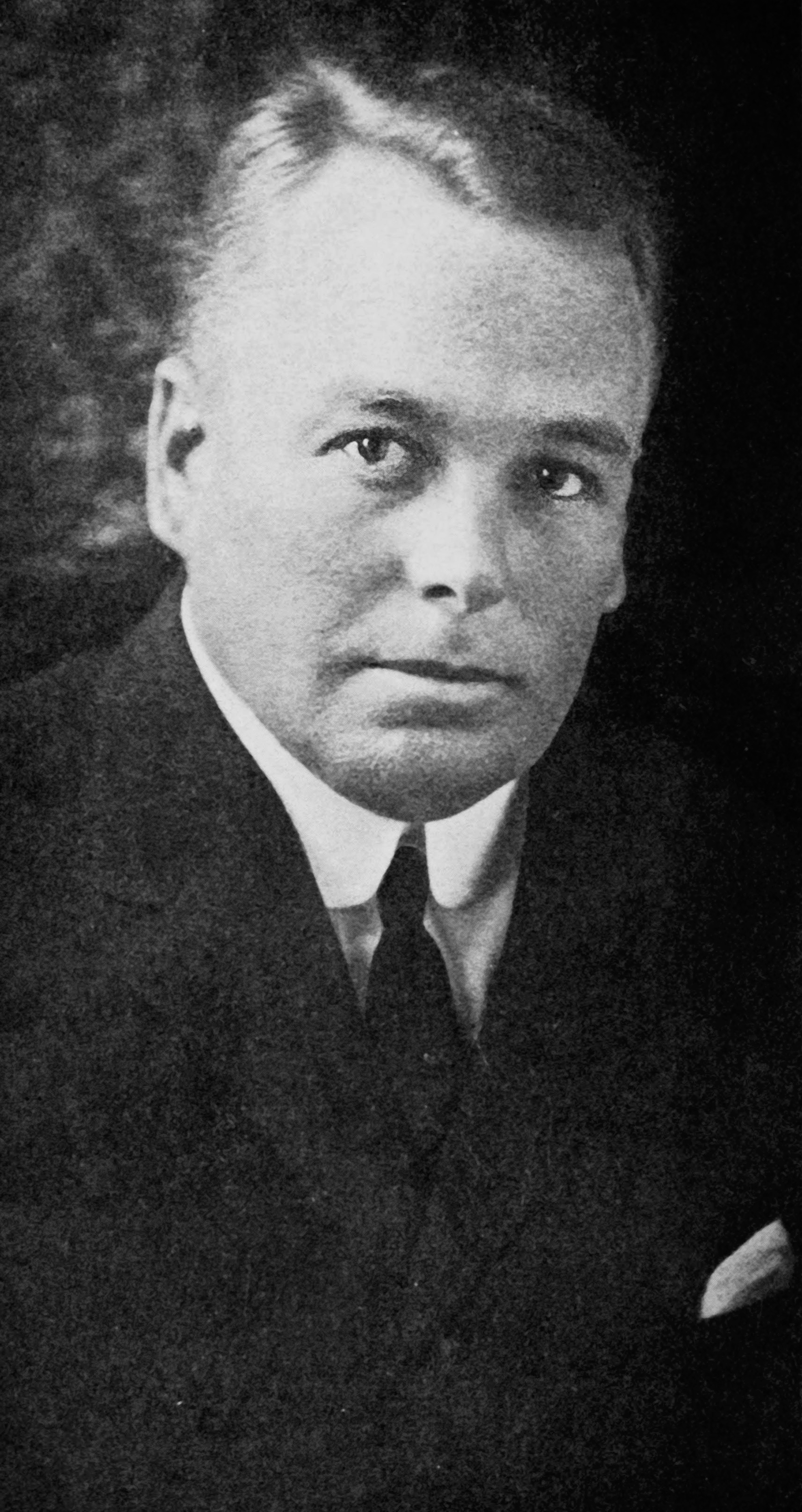
Frank Fowler Baldwin in 1921

Son Frank Fowler Baldwin was born March 30, 1878, attended Yale but left in 1898. He started work as a field worker and eventually became President of Kahului Railroad in 1910, and of the Hawaiian Commercial Company (HC&S) when Henry Perrine died. In 1948 Frank combined HC&S with Maui Agricultural Company for a combined 25,454 acres (10,301 ha). He died February 6, 1960.

Daughters Maud Mansfield (Baldwin) Cooke (1872–1961) and Charlotte (Baldwin) Rice (1884–1938) married descendants of other missionaries, Joseph Platt Cooke (1870–1918), and Harold Waterhouse Rice, who also were in the sugar business. Cooke was grandson of Amos Starr Cooke and nephew of businessman Samuel Gardner Wilder.

Youngest son Samuel Alexander Baldwin was born August 30, 1885. He attended Punahou School, Oakland High School in California, and Yale in 1908. He married Katherine Smith in Honolulu, May 10, 1909. He became a champion polo player and managed Haleakala Ranch when von Tempsky retired. Samuel died July 21, 1950.

In 1910 the Baldwins founded the Fred Baldwin memorial foundation in honor of their son Fred Chambers Baldwin (1881–1905) who died October 11, 1905, in New York City. From 1910 through World War II it supported an elderly housing facility. Since then it has made grants to the Maui community.

Henry Perrine Baldwin had an operation for appendicitis in January 1909 and traveled to California in the summer of 1911. He died a few days after returning on July 8, 1911.

David Thomas Fleming (1881–1955) was manager of Baldwin's Honolua Ranch where he planted pineapple in 1912. Fleming converted the cattle ranch to a pineapple plantation. This was the beginning of Maui Land & Pineapple Company, an industry that continued until 2009.

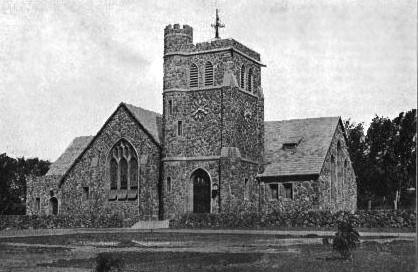
H. P. Baldwin memorial church in 1917

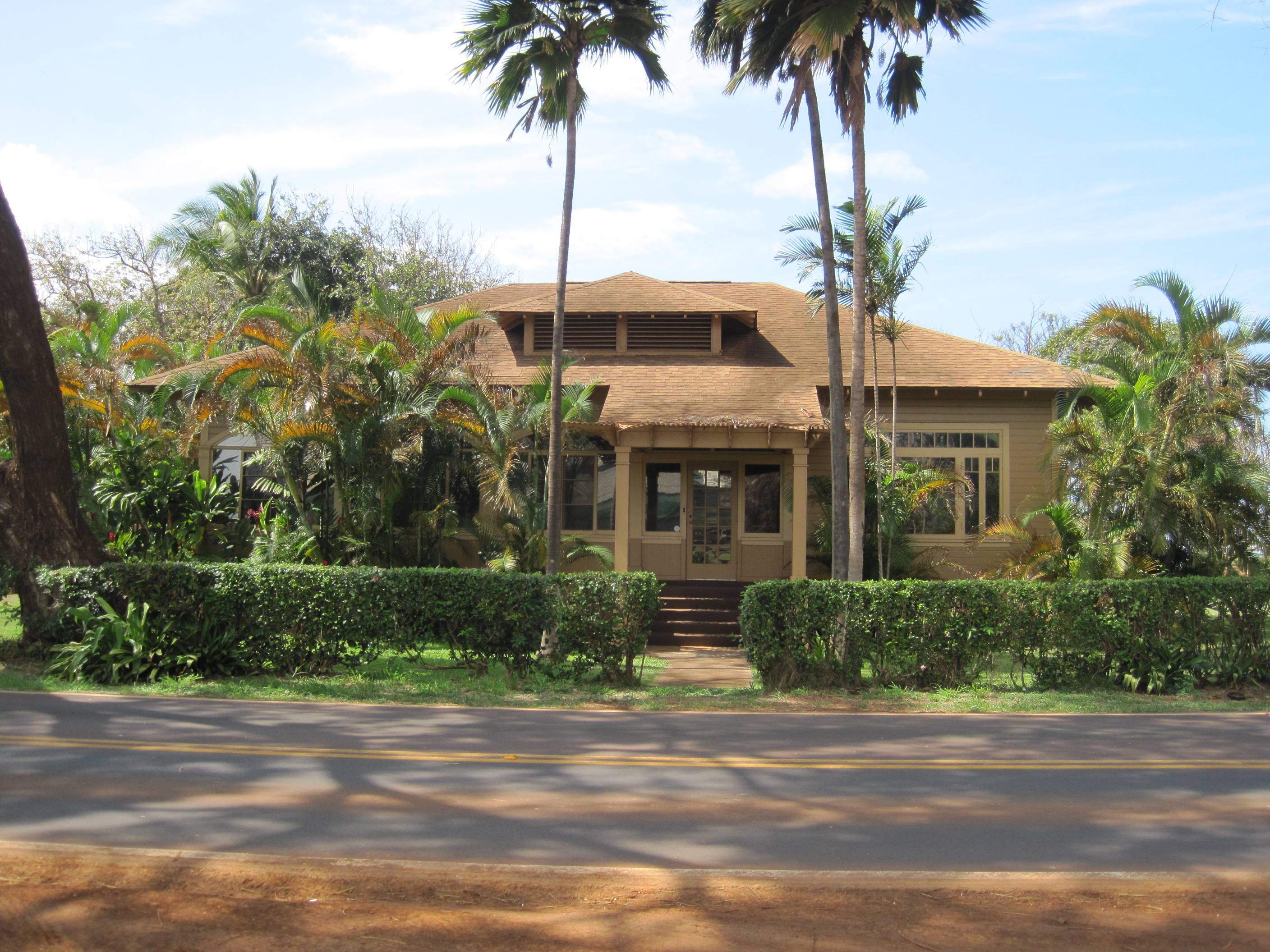
Alexander & Baldwin Sugar Museum in the former Puʻunēnē Mill manager's house

In 1913 the Old Maui High School was built on the Hamakuapoko plantation land. Henry Perrine Baldwin High School was named for him in Wailuku, Hawaii in 1934. The former superintendent's residence of a Hawaiian Commercial & Sugar Company sugar mill in Puʻunēnē is now the Alexander & Baldwin Sugar Museum. H.A. Baldwin Beach Park is located on the north shore of Maui between Spreckelsville and Paia.

In 1916 another new Makawao Union Church was built of concrete with stone veneer and is called the "Henry Perrine Baldwin Memorial Church". Many Baldwin family members are buried in the Makawao Cemetery near him. William Hyde Rice (son of William Harrison Rice and father of Harold W. Rice who married Charlotte Baldwin) and Henry Alexander Baldwin were among the notable speakers.

== See also ==
- Sugar plantations in Hawaii
- Alexander & Baldwin Sugar Museum

== Family tree ==
Alexander & Baldwin family tree

William P. Alexander (1805–1884) | Mary Ann McKinney (1810–1888) | Amos Starr Cooke (1810–1871) | Juliette Montague (1812–1896) | Dwight Baldwin (1798–1886) | Charlotte Fowler (1805–1873) | J. W. Smith (1810–1887
David Dwight Baldwin (1831–1912) | W. O. Smith (1848–1929)
William D. Alexander (1833–1913) | Abigail Baldwin (1847–1912) | Samuel T. Alexander (1836–1904) | Martha Eliza Cooke | Ann Elizabeth Alexander (1843–1940) | Henry P. Baldwin (1842–1911) | Emily Whitney Alexander (1846–1943)
Agnes Alexander (1875–1971) | Annie Montague Alexander (1867–1950) | C.W. Dickey (1871–1942) | Belle Dickey (1880–1972) | James Dole (1877–1958) | Henry Alexander Baldwin (1871–1946) | Ethel Frances Smith (1879–1967)
J. Walter Cameron (1895–1976) | Francis Baldwin (1904–1996)
Colin C. Cameron (1927–1992) (Kapalua)
