= The Maui News =

Hawaii-based daily newspaper

- Type: Daily newspaper
- Owner(s): Maui Nui Media and Creativity Collaborative
- Founder: George B. Robertson
- Publisher: Joe Bradley
- Editor: David Hoff
- Founded: February 17, 1900
- Language: English
- Headquarters: 100 Mahalani Street; Wailuku, Hawaii 96793, United States
- Circulation: 11,486 Daily; 13,047 Sunday (as of 2019)
- ISSN: 8750-457X
- Website: mauinews.com

The Maui News is a Wailuku, Hawaii based, daily newspaper covering the islands of Maui, Lanai and Molokai.

== History ==
On February 17, 1900, The Maui News began publication. George B. Robertson was its editor and founder. In August 1904, C.L. Clement was appointed business manager. In February 1905, Clement organized a stock company and acquired the paper from Robertson, and then succeeded him as editor. Henry Perrine Baldwin was a major stockholder.

In October 1905, the News published an editorial announcing Clement had been forced out of the business. Clement then committed suicide, shooting himself in the head with a pistol. In 1911, H.P. Baldwin died.

In 1924, Miss Frances H. Baldwin, the eldest daughter of Harry A. Baldwin and granddaughter of H.P. Baldwin, married J. Walter Cameron. In 1939, Cameron was put in charge of the paper. In January 1946, H.A. Baldwin resigned from active management of his companies, and died that October. He was largely succeeded at various enterprises by Cameron.

In 1947, Maui Publishing launched a radio station with the call letters KMVI. In 1955, the company launched a television station called KMVI-TV. In 1956, Cameron purchased stock in the Maui Publishing Co., giving him complete control of the paper. In 1975, company general manager and executive vice president William Osgood Paine died from an apparent self-inflicted gunshot wound. In 1976, Cameron died. At that time his son Richard Cameron took over the publishing business.

In 1979, KMVI was sold. In 1981, the 11-year-old Maui Sun, a rival paper, closed, leaving the News as the only daily paper left on the island. In 1984, the News added a Sunday edition. Circulation at that time was 16,000. In 1988, a $3 million production plant was built. In 1996, Frances Baldwin died. That same year, the paper faced a $500,000 deficit, leading the company to lay off 10% of staff. In October 1999, Richard Cameron announced the News was for sale due to the paper financially struggling.

In December 1999, Ogden Newspapers agreed to buy the paper. Following the sale, the News switched from an afternoon to a morning paper. In 2009, unionized workers agreed to a 10% pay cut due to the Great Recession. On June 23, 2023, Ogden announced it was exploring options for the possible sale of their Maui Publishing group and was planning to accept offers from interested parties over the next few weeks. In April 2024, the newspaper announced it will switch from daily to weekly printing, and will only send out a physical print edition on Thursdays. In July 2026, Ogden sold the News to Maui Nui Media and Creativity Collaborative, a local nonprofit.
