= Museum of Sugar =

Brazilian museum

The Museum of Sugar (in Brazilian Portuguese: Museu do Açúcar) was a museum devoted to the history of the sugar industry in Brazil. It was envisioned by Gil de Methódio Maranhão and created on August 3, 1960, by Resolution 1745 of the Institute of Sugar and Alcohol (IAA).

The first exhibition was in Rio de Janeiro at IAA headquarters. The museum was relocated to Recife on January 30, 1961, and into its own building as the O Açúcar e o Homem (Sugar and Man) exhibit in October 1963. The museum was designed by Carlos Antônio Falcão Correia Lima in the Casa Forte neighbourhood. The landscaping was planned by agronomist Dárdano de Andrade Lima. Aloísio Magalhães organized sugarcane plantings in a design with a vertical mill-stone from the Vila da Rainha Plantation in Rio de Janeiro and a horizontal mill-stone from the Camaragibe Plantation in Pernambuco. The museum acquired an extensive collection of memorabilia and artifacts. Conferences and courses were hosted and the Revista do Museu do Açúcar (Museum of Sugar Magazine) was published from 1968 until 1973. Authors of articles included José Antônio Gonsalves de Mello, Ariano Suassuna, Fernando Pio, and Jayme Griz.

The Sugar Museum and its holdings were acquired by the Joaquim Nabuco Institute for Social Research, which is now the Joaquim Nabuco Foundation. The museum and all its patrimony were transferred to the Institute through Law nº 6.456 on 26 October 1977. The museum became the Joaquim Nabuco Foundation's Museum of the Northeastern Man, where the archives from the sugar museum are held.

== See also ==
- Alexander & Baldwin Sugar Museum
