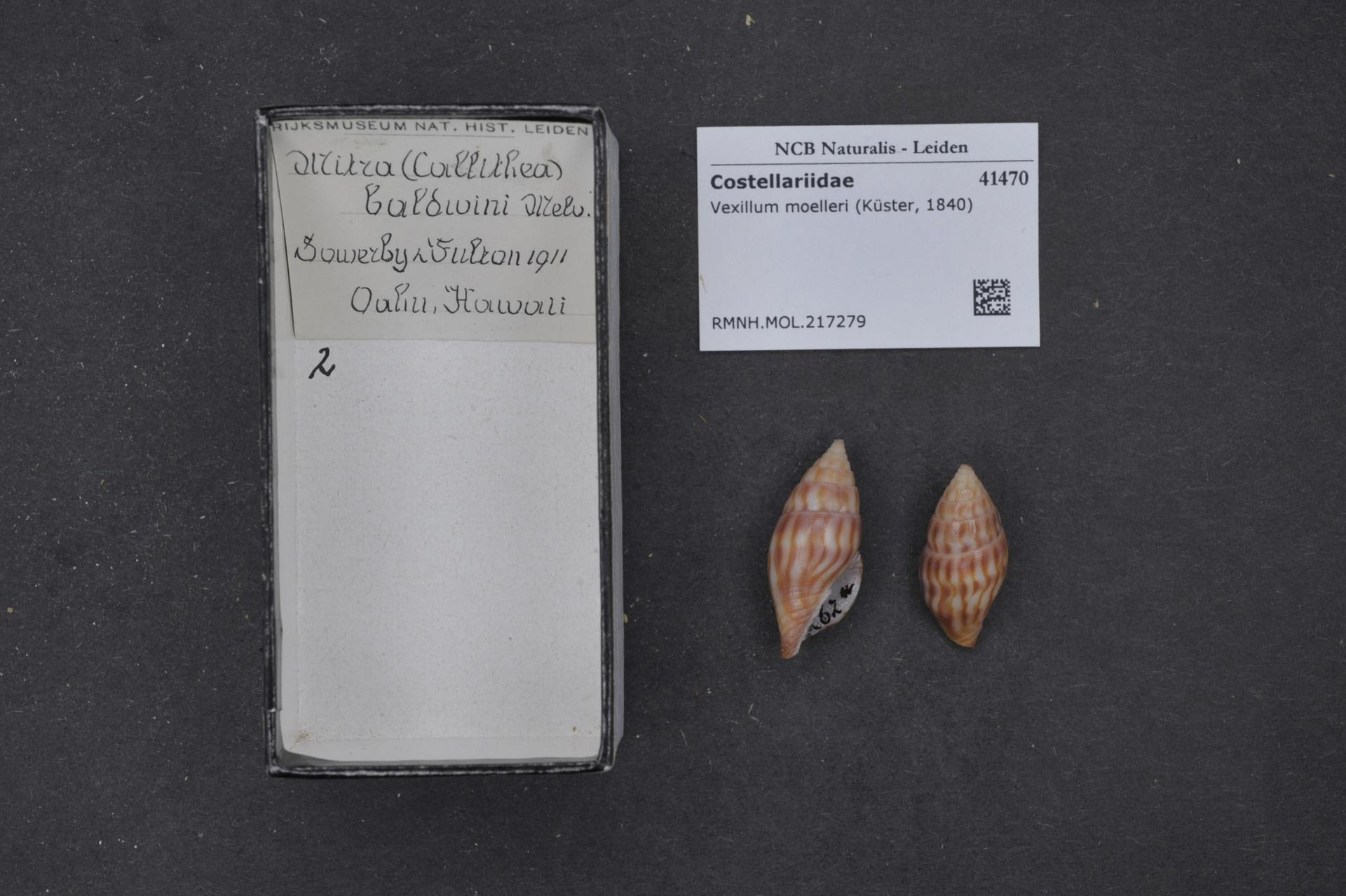

Scientific classification
- Kingdom: Animalia
- Phylum: Mollusca
- Class: Gastropoda
- Subclass: Caenogastropoda
- Order: Neogastropoda
- Family: Costellariidae
- Genus: Vexillum
- Species: V. moelleri

Binomial name
- Vexillum moelleri (Küster, 1840)

Synonyms
- Mitra (Strigatella) baldwinii Melvill, 1899; Mitra baldwinii Melvill, 1899; Mitra flammulata Pease, 1868; Mitra moelleri Küster, 1840 (original combination); Mitra zebrina Garrett, 1873 (invalid: junior homonym of Mitra zebrina d'Orbigny, 1840); Pusia moelleri (Küster, 1840) ·; Vexillum (Pusia) moelleri (Küster, 1840) · accepted, alternate representation

= Vexillum moelleri =

Species of gastropod

Vexillum moelleri is a species of small sea snail, marine gastropod mollusk in the family Costellariidae, the ribbed miters.

== Description ==
The length of the shell attains 14.7 mm.

(Described as Mitra flammulata) The solid shell is smooth, shining, ovately-fusiform and somewhat attenuated at both ends. It is finely striated transversely, grooved at the base. The apex is acute and finely ribbed longitudinally. The shell contains nine convex whorls. They are contiguous and somewhat swollen. The columella is prominently four-plaited, with a slight callosity at top. The outer lip is regularly grooved within its whole length. The base of the shell is slightly produced, somewhat contracted, and recurved in a twisted manner. The aperture is straight, rather narrow, one-half the length of the shell. The shell is whitish, longitudinally painted, with broad, somewhat flexuous, reddish-brown flames. The aperture is white.

== Distribution ==
This species occurs in the Pacific Ocean off Hawaii, Fiji, Samoa, Tahiti, the Cook Islands and the Tuamotu Islands; also off the Philippines.
