= Dwight Baldwin (missionary) =

American Christian missionary and physician on Maui during the Kingdom of Hawaii

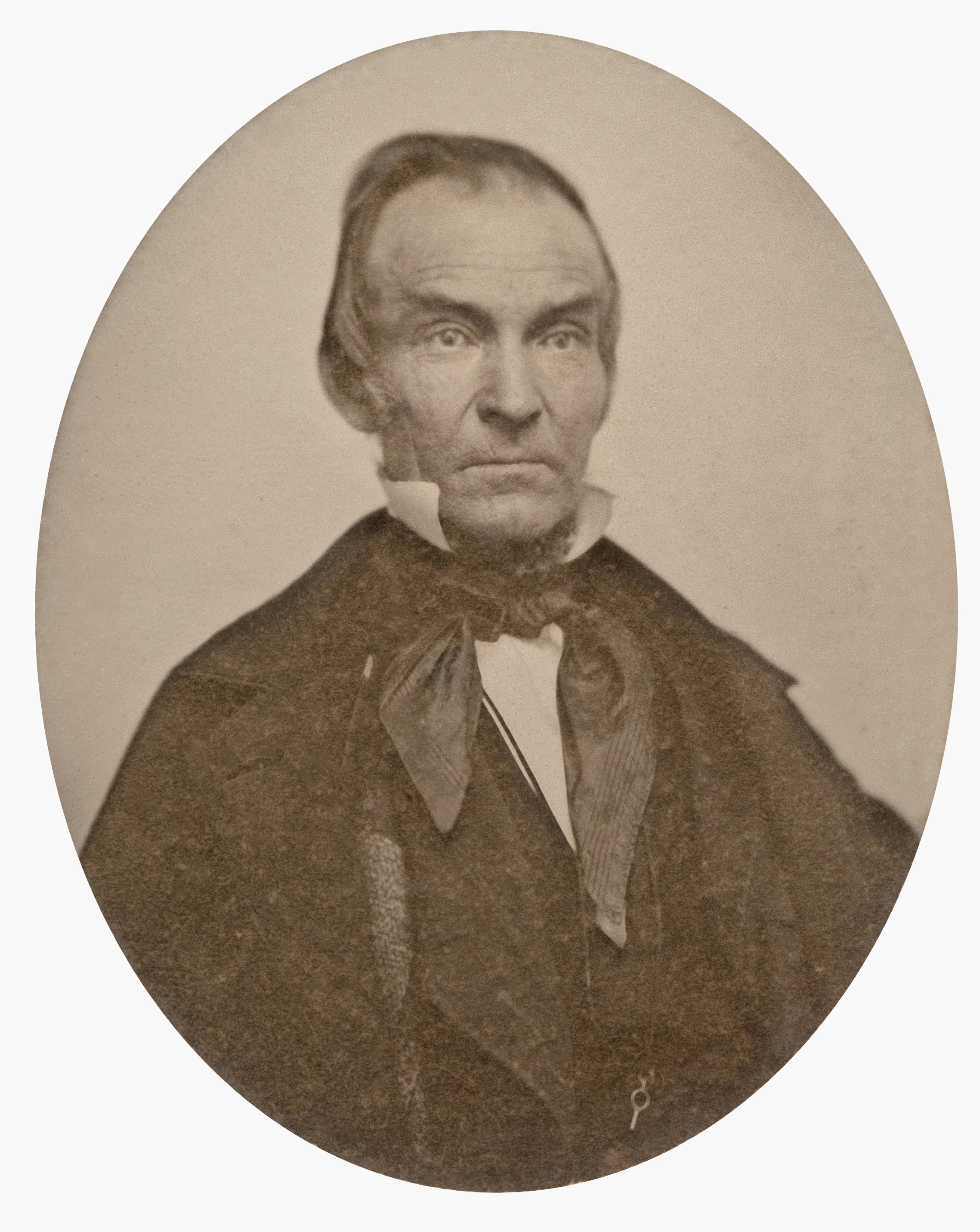
- Born: September 29, 1798; Durham, Connecticut, US
- Died: January 3, 1886 (aged 87); Lahaina, Hawaii
- Occupations: Missionary, Physician
- Spouse: Charlotte Fowler
- Children: David Dwight Baldwin; Henry Perrine Baldwin; Five others
- Parent(s): Seth Baldwin; Rhoda Hull

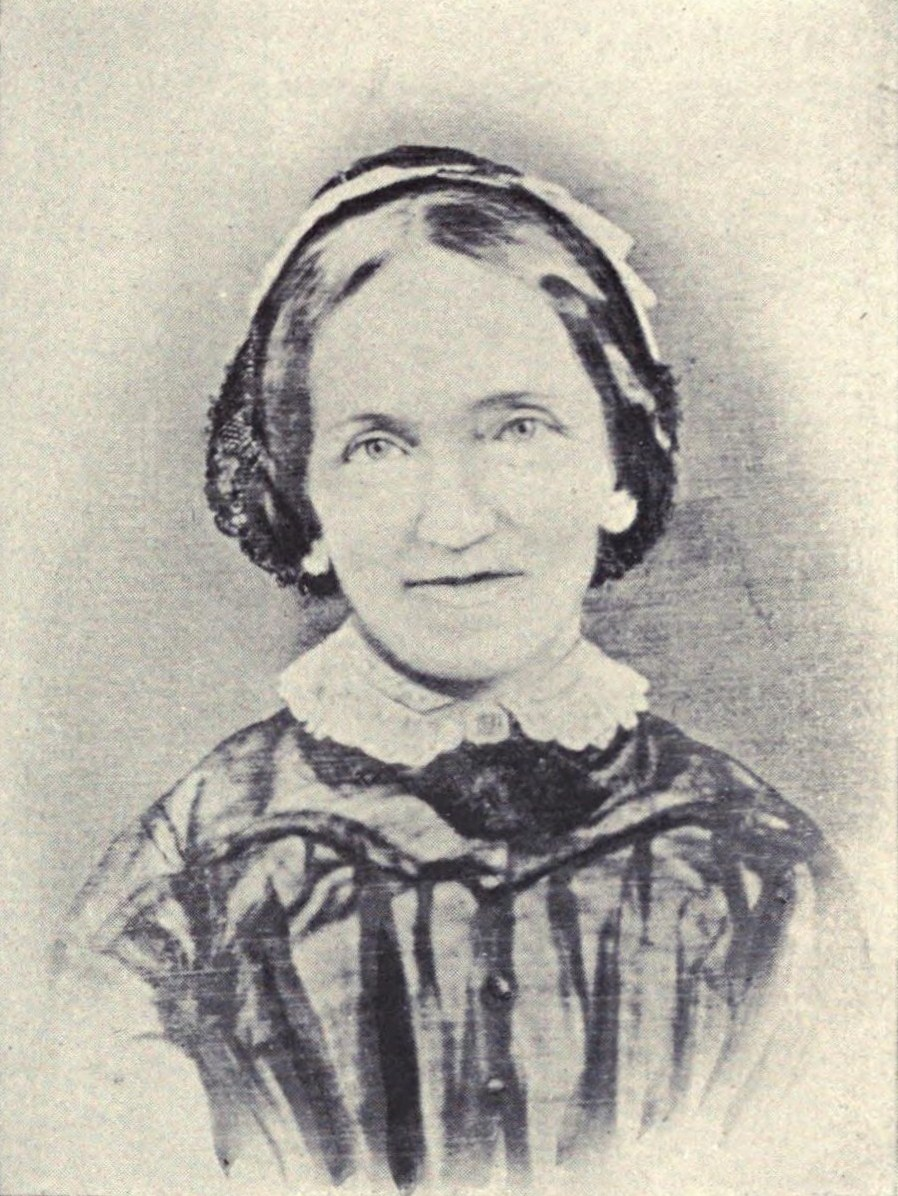
Charlotte Baldwin, c. 1860.

Dwight Baldwin (September 29, 1798 – January 3, 1886) was an American Christian missionary and medical doctor on Maui, one of the Hawaiian Islands, during the Kingdom of Hawaii. He was patriarch of a family that founded some of the largest businesses in the islands.

== Life ==
Baldwin was born on September 29, 1798, in Durham, Connecticut, and moved to Durham, New York, in 1804. His father was Seth Baldwin (1775–1832) and his mother was Rhoda Hull. He was the second of 12 children. His cousin Elihu W. Baldwin, a prominent Presbyterian minister, became president of Wabash College. Dwight studied for two years at Williams College and graduated from Yale in 1821; he taught school for three years. He attended medical classes at Harvard College, but only for a master of science degree, not a Doctor of Medicine. Around 1826 he decided to become a missionary. He attended Auburn Theological Seminary and was ordained at Utica, New York, in 1830. On December 3, 1830, he married Charlotte Fowler (1805–1873), the daughter of Deacon Solomon Fowler of North Branford, Connecticut. Only a few weeks later, on December 28, 1830, they sailed on the ship New England from New Bedford, Massachusetts, with the Fourth Company of American Board of Commissioners for Foreign Missions. Their ship, which also carried Sheldon Dibble, arrived in Hawaii on June 21, 1831.

The Baldwins had seven children: David Dwight Baldwin (1831–1912), Abigail Charlette (1833–1913), Charles Fowler (1837–1891), Henry Perrine Baldwin (1842–1911), Emily Sophronia (1844–1891), and Harriet Melinda (1846–1932). A son, Douglas Hoapili Baldwin, died young in 1843.

In November 1831, William P. Alexander and his wife, Mary Ann McKinney, also sailed from New Bedford in the next company. The two families became lifelong friends; they had two inter-marriages and a business partnership.

Dwight Baldwin returned to visit the United States from 1856 to 1857. In 1870 he and Charlotte moved to Honolulu as their health deteriorated and lived with their daughter Harriet (called "Hattie"). Charlotte died October 2, 1873, and Dwight died on January 3, 1886; they are buried at the Kawaiahaʻo Church cemetery.

== Work ==
Baldwin was first assigned in January 1832 to the mission in Waimea on the island of Hawaiʻi to serve with Lorenzo Lyons at Imiola Church. Then in 1836 he was sent to Waineʻe Church (now called Waiola Church) established by William Richards at Lahaina on the island of Maui, which became the base for most of the rest of his career.

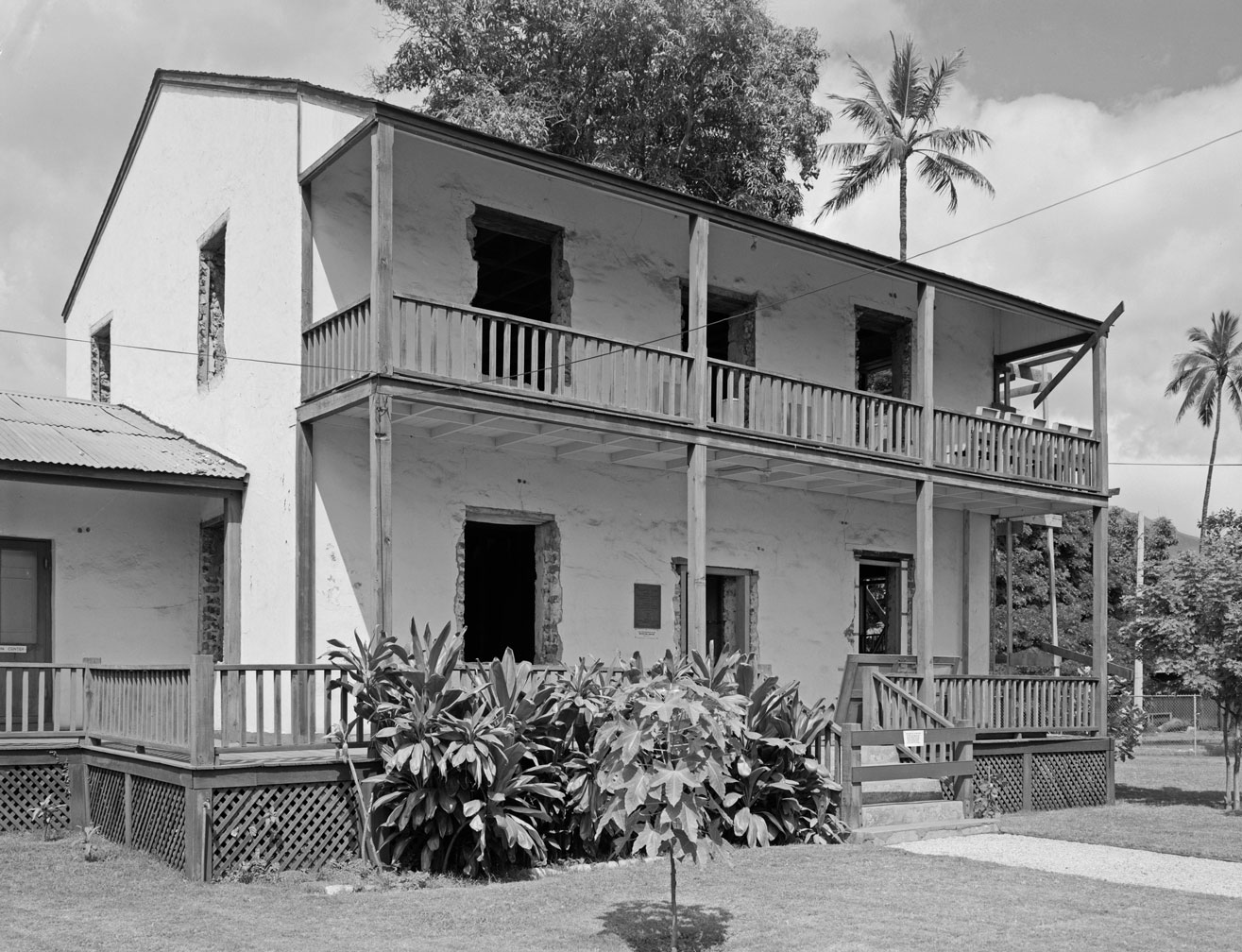
The Baldwin house during reconstruction in 1966.

From 1834 to 1835 Reverend Ephraim Spaulding had constructed a house of coral and volcanic stone at Lahaina. Thick walls were framed by hand-hewn timbers. In 1838 Spaulding had returned to the United States, so the Baldwin family moved in, and would own the house for almost 130 years. In 1840, a bedroom and study were added, and in 1849 an entire second story was completed. The house was deeded from the Baldwin family to the Lahaina Restoration Foundation in 1967 for use as the Baldwin House Museum (also called the Baldwin Home Museum). The House is located at 696 Front Street, 20°52′23″N 156°40′40″W. Baldwin's collection of scientific books grew to be over 200 volumes. Visiting scientists, such as those on the United States Exploring Expedition, stayed with his family.

Baldwin began a seaman's chapel at Lahaina where Lorrin Andrews served. He acted as unofficial postmaster of Maui. He understood the toll of alcoholism on the people, so translated a tract on temperance into the Hawaiian language and assisted Andrews with the translation of the Gospels and Acts for a new edition of the New Testament. Since Lahaina served as the capital of the Kingdom at the time, King Kamehameha III and other important leaders such as Maui island governor Hoapili and his wife Queen Kalākua Kaheiheimālie would attend his church.

A series of epidemics swept through the Hawaiian islands from October 1848 to early 1849. The first to hit were whooping cough and measles, to which the Hawaiians had no resistance. Although trained primarily for spiritual healing, his biology coursework made him the leading expert on Maui in Western medicine. By then the royal court and government functions had moved to Honolulu. The few formally educated medical doctors in the islands were in private practice there: Gerrit P. Judd, Thomas Charles Byde Rooke, William Hillebrand, and Wesley Newcomb. Baldwin instead focused on public health issues, and discovered through experience what techniques could be applied in the remote tropical environment. In his words:

I can compare to nothing but a raging battle, with all its turmoil & its sad scenes of death & carnage. Never was I driven so to distraction, week after week, & month after month, with no respite.

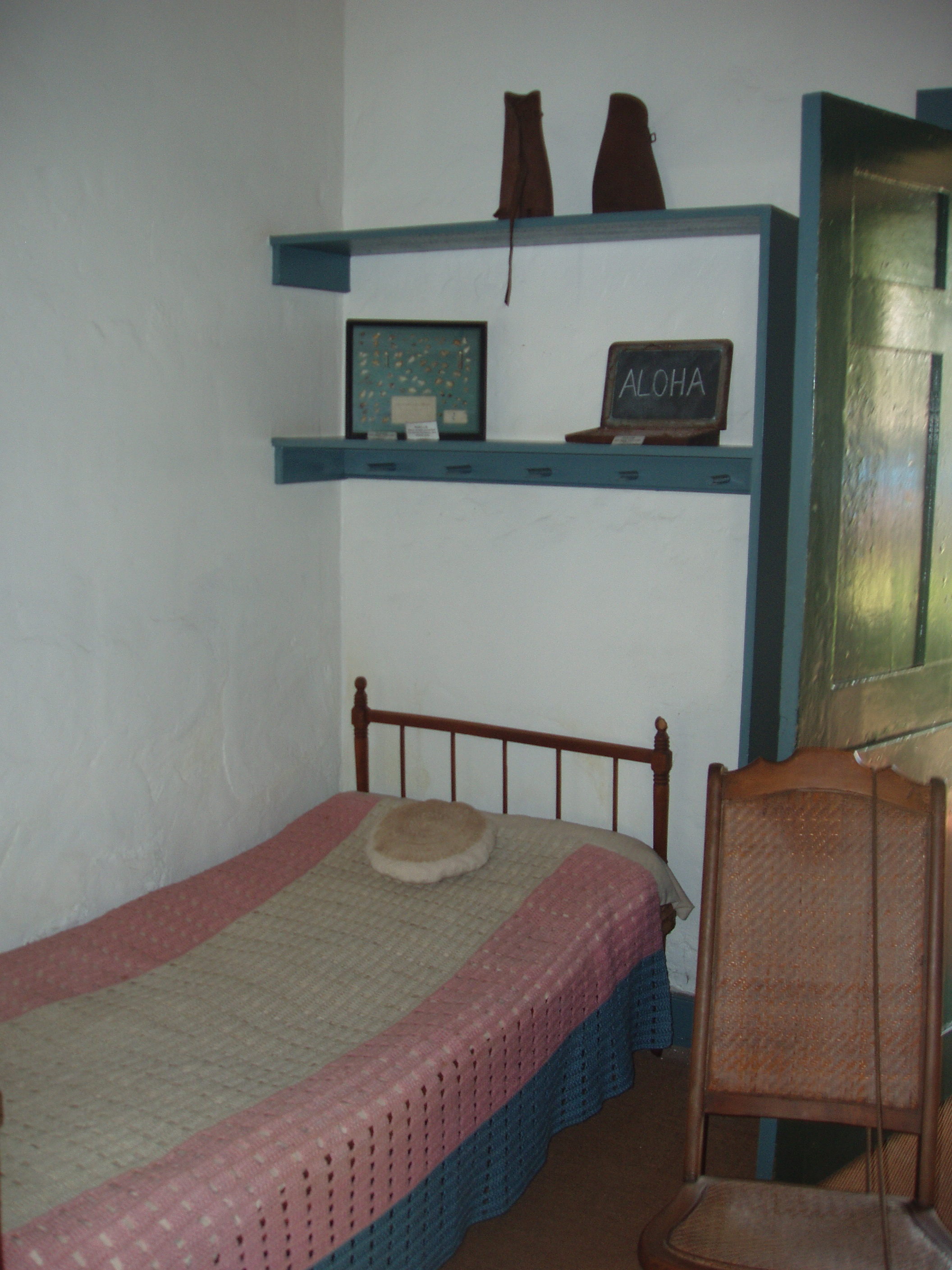
Restored Baldwin House, 2007.

Soon after followed waves of dysentery, and influenza. Although there had been previous epidemics, one reason suggested for this timing was the California Gold Rush. Before this time foreign arrivals sailed from either Europe around South Africa, or from New England around Cape Horn. These voyages were long enough that infected people had either died (and were buried at sea) or recovered by the time their ships arrived in Hawaii. But from 1848 faster ships from San Francisco could cross the ocean in less than two weeks; there could still be infection aboard when they arrived.

Baldwin traveled throughout the islands of Maui, Molokaʻi and Lānaʻi dealing as best he could with the epidemics. Then in 1853, a smallpox epidemic struck the islands. By now an experienced practicing physician, Baldwin was able to get Lahaina quarantined and vaccinated as many residents as he could, then set out to take care of people in the far reaches of Maui and adjacent islands. Although precise counts are not known, there were thousands of deaths on Oahu; Baldwin is credited with keeping the toll to only a few hundred on Maui.

In 1855 the congregation of Waineʻe church volunteered their labor under his direction to build a large building called Hale Aloha to commemorate living through the epidemics. He was finally granted an honorary degree of medicine by Dartmouth College in 1859.

The privately practicing physicians who formed the Hawaii medical association did not accept his credentials, and denied him an official medical license from the Board of Health. He tried to retire in 1868, but Benjamin Wyman Parker (1803–1873) convinced him to help teach in a seminary to train native Hawaiian pastors. He taught at the Theological School in Honolulu from 1872 until 1877. He served as trustee of Oahu College (now known as Punahou School, where many of his children and grandchildren would attend) from 1853 to 1875.

== Legacy ==
Eldest son David Dwight Baldwin (1831–1912) was a businessman, biologist, and educator on Maui. He and his sons started the first pineapple business on the island.

Daughter Abigail Charlotte Baldwin (1833–1912) married William DeWitt Alexander (1833–1913) in 1861, and their daughter Mary Charlotte Alexander (1874–1961) became an author. Mary Charlotte Alexander wrote a biography of her grandfather, Dr. Baldwin of Lahaina and a history of Hawaii.

Son Henry Perrine Baldwin (1842–1911) married Emily Whitney Alexander in 1869 and co-founded with Samuel Thomas Alexander the partnership of Alexander & Baldwin, one of the "Big Five" corporations that dominated Hawaii's economy in the early 20th century.

Daughter Emily Baldwin married businessman William Olmsted Atwater (1848–1908) on April 5, 1873.

Daughter Harriet Melinda Baldwin married Samuel Mills Damon (1845–1924), the son of missionary Samuel Chenery Damon, who became a wealthy businessman. Before her last grandchild died in 2004, and the estate was divided, it was one of the largest private landowners in the state.

On August 8, 2023, a massive wildfire destroyed the Baldwin Home Museum alongside most of the historic town of Lahaina.

== Family tree ==
Alexander & Baldwin family tree

William P. Alexander (1805–1884)	Mary Ann McKinney (1810–1888)	Amos Starr Cooke (1810–1871)	Juliette Montague (1812–1896)	Dwight Baldwin (1798–1886)	Charlotte Fowler (1805–1873)	J. W. Smith (1810–1887
David Dwight Baldwin (1831–1912)	W. O. Smith (1848–1929)
William D. Alexander (1833–1913)	Abigail Baldwin (1847–1912)	Samuel T. Alexander (1836–1904)	Martha Eliza Cooke	Ann Elizabeth Alexander (1843–1940)	Henry P. Baldwin (1842–1911)	Emily Whitney Alexander (1846–1943)
Agnes Alexander (1875–1971)	Annie Montague Alexander (1867–1950)	C.W. Dickey (1871–1942)	Belle Dickey (1880–1972)	James Dole (1877–1958)	Henry Alexander Baldwin (1871–1946)	Ethel Frances Smith (1879–1967)
J. Walter Cameron (1895–1976)	Francis Baldwin (1904–1996)
Colin C. Cameron (1927–1992) (Kapalua)
