= Henry Alexander Baldwin =

American politician

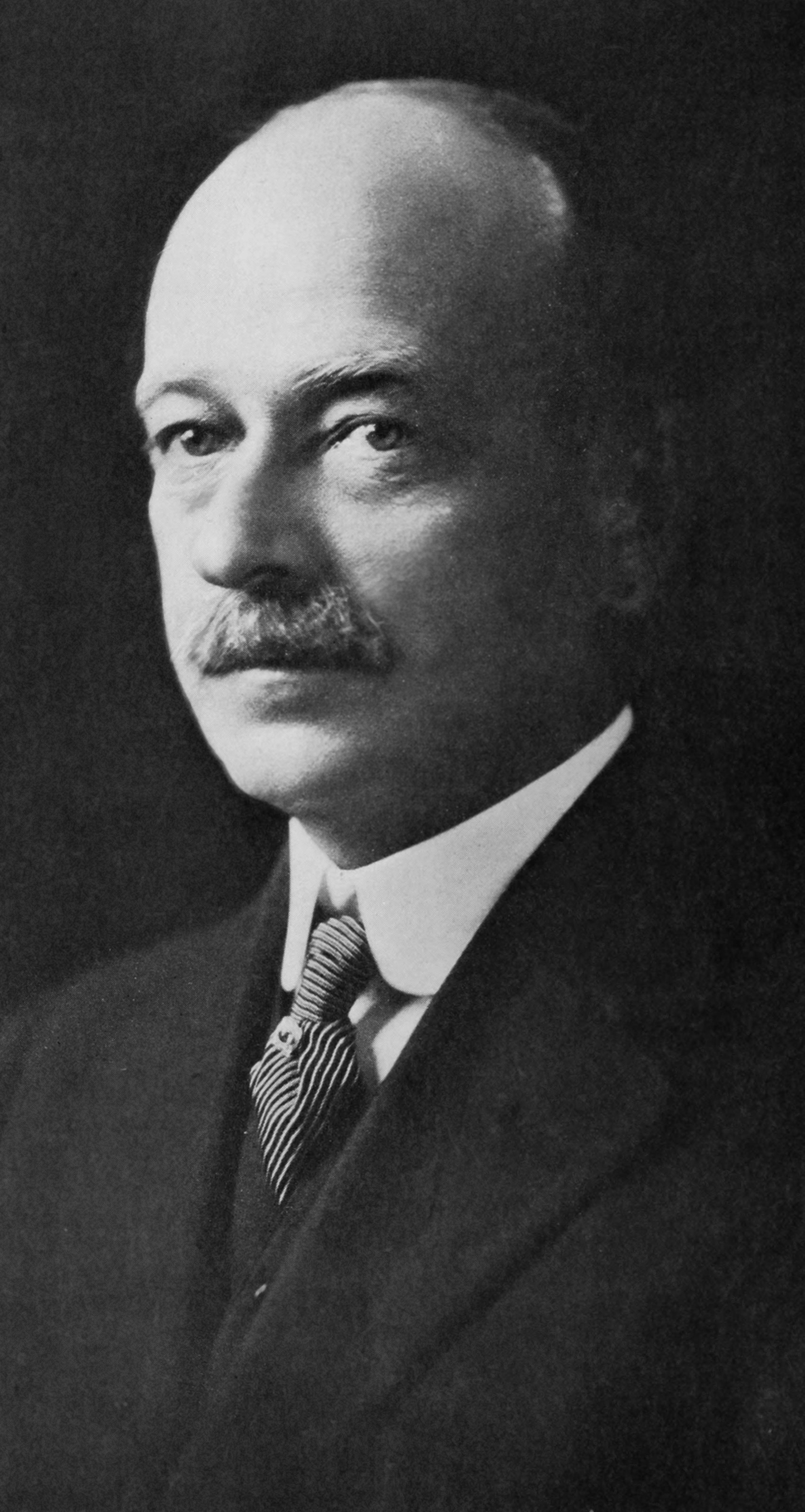
- Known as "Harry Baldwin"

Delegate to the U.S. House of Representatives from Hawaii Territory's At-large district
- In office March 25, 1922 – March 3, 1923
- Preceded by: Jonah Kūhiō Kalanianaʻole
- Succeeded by: William P. Jarrett

Personal details
- Born: January 12, 1871 Maui, Kingdom of Hawaii
- Died: October 8, 1946 (aged 75) Pāʻia, Maui, Territory of Hawaii
- Party: Hawaii Republican Party
- Spouse: Ethel Frances Smith
- Children: Frances Hobron Baldwin

Henry Alexander Baldwin or Harry Alexander Baldwin (January 12, 1871 – October 8, 1946) was an American businessman and politician who served as Congressional Delegate to the United States House of Representatives representing the Territory of Hawaii. He was one of the earliest leaders of the Hawaii Republican Party. He was president of the Maui Agricultural Company and director of Baldwin Bank, which later became part of First Hawaiian Bank.

== Life ==
Baldwin was born on January 12, 1871, in the Baldwin house at the Paliuli sugar mill, between the towns of Pāʻia and Makawao, on Maui, Kingdom of Hawaii. His father Henry Perrine Baldwin and uncle Samuel Thomas Alexander had established Alexander & Baldwin (A&B) one of the "Big Five" corporations that dominated Hawaii economics in the early twentieth century, in 1869. His father was son of early missionary Dwight Baldwin, and his mother Emily Whitney Alexander was daughter of early missionary William P. Alexander. Baldwin was educated in Honolulu at Punahou School. His parents sent him to Phillips Academy in Andover, Massachusetts, from which he graduated in 1889. In 1894, Baldwin obtained a degree at the Massachusetts Institute of Technology, where he was a member of Chi Phi fraternity.

He returned to work for his father and uncle as manager of the Hamakuapoko sugarcane plantation from 1897 to 1904. After A&B took control of the larger Hawaiian Commercial and Sugar Company, the Hamakuapoko mill was merged with the larger Pāʻia mill in 1905, and he became president of the combined operation called the Maui Agricultural Company. He served as president of Maui Telephone Company, and Maui Publishing Company. He was a director of Baldwin Bank, which later became part of First Hawaiian Bank. In 1916, during World War I, he served as colonel of the 3rd Regiment of the Hawaii National Guard. On July 19, 1897, he married Ethel Frances Smith (1879–1967), daughter of lawyer William Owen Smith in Honolulu — his younger brother Samuel would later marry sister Katherine Smith. They had one daughter, Frances Hobron (1904–1996) who married J. Walter Cameron (1895–1976), manager of the pineapple plantation in Honolua. Cameron's company Maui Pineapple Company merged with Baldwin's pineapple business to become the Maui Land & Pineapple Company. The Camerons' son Colin Cameron founded the Kapalua Bay Hotel & Villas resort. The pineapple business continued until 2009.

== Politics ==
Baldwin became county chairman for the Hawaii Republican Party in 1912. He entered local politics in 1913 when he was elected to the Hawaii Territorial Senate. He was territorial senator until 1921 when he was called to higher office to fulfill the unexpired term of Prince Jonah Kūhiō Kalanianaʻole in Washington, D.C., who had died. Baldwin was elected to fill the vacancy for Congressional Delegate from March 25, 1922, to March 3, 1923. Despite pleas to continue service, he retired from politics and returned to his private business ventures. Baldwin emerged from retirement to serve in the Hawaii Territorial House of Representatives in 1933. Following a single term, Baldwin returned to the upper chamber where he became territory senate president in 1937. He died at Pāʻia, Maui on October 8, 1946, and was buried in Makawao Cemetery.

== Legacy ==
A beach park near Pāʻia, originally a company recreation facility, is named for him at 20°54′46″N 156°23′27″W. The 1917 mansion designed by his cousin architect Charles William Dickey called Kaluanui is now the home of Hui Noʻeau Visual Arts Center. It is located at 2841 Baldwin Avenue, Makawao, 20°52′14″N 156°19′17″W.

== Family tree ==
Alexander & Baldwin family tree

William P. Alexander (1805–1884)	Mary Ann McKinney (1810–1888)	Amos Starr Cooke (1810–1871)	Juliette Montague (1812–1896)	Dwight Baldwin (1798–1886)	Charlotte Fowler (1805–1873)	J. W. Smith (1810–1887
David Dwight Baldwin (1831–1912)	W. O. Smith (1848–1929)
William D. Alexander (1833–1913)	Abigail Baldwin (1847–1912)	Samuel T. Alexander (1836–1904)	Martha Eliza Cooke	Ann Elizabeth Alexander (1843–1940)	Henry P. Baldwin (1842–1911)	Emily Whitney Alexander (1846–1943)
Agnes Alexander (1875–1971)	Annie Montague Alexander (1867–1950)	C.W. Dickey (1871–1942)	Belle Dickey (1880–1972)	James Dole (1877–1958)	Henry Alexander Baldwin (1871–1946)	Ethel Frances Smith (1879–1967)
J. Walter Cameron (1895–1976)	Francis Baldwin (1904–1996)
Colin C. Cameron (1927–1992) (Kapalua)

== See also ==
- Sugar plantations in Hawaii

U.S. House of Representatives
Preceded by Jonah Kūhiō Kalanianaʻole	Delegate to the U.S. House of Representatives from Hawaii Territory's at-large congressional district March 25, 1922 – March 3, 1923	Succeeded by William Paul Jarrett
