= David Dwight Baldwin =

American businessman, educator, and biologist (1831–1912)

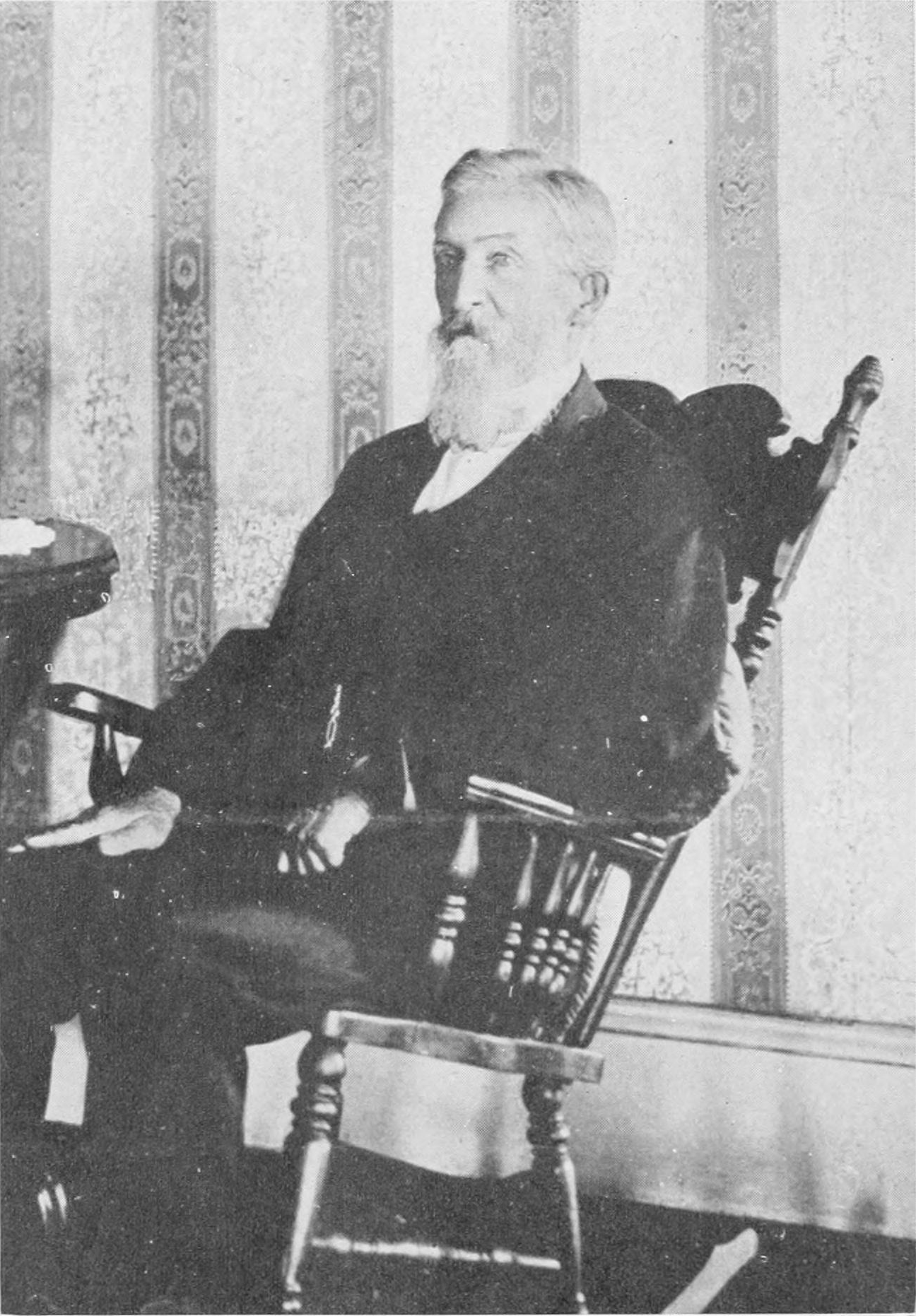
- Near his death, circa 1910
- Born: November 26, 1831; Honolulu, Kingdom of Hawaii
- Died: June 16, 1912 (aged 80); Honolulu
- Resting place: Makawao Union Church
- Education: Yale
- Occupations: Businessman, Educator
- Spouse: Lois Gregory Morris
- Children: 8
- Parent(s): Dwight Baldwin; Charlotte Fowler

David Dwight Baldwin (November 26, 1831 – June 16, 1912) was a businessman, educator, and biologist on Maui in the Hawaiian Islands. Within biology he is known for his contributions to the study of Hawaiian land snails, part of malacology.

== Life ==
David Dwight Baldwin was born November 26, 1831, in Honolulu. His father was early missionary doctor Dwight Baldwin (1798–1886), and his mother was Charlotte Fowler Baldwin (1805–1873). After a few years living in Waimea, the family moved to the island of Maui around 1837. From 1841 through 1851, Baldwin attended Punahou School in Honolulu, and graduated from Yale in 1857. He married Lois Gregory Morris (1837–1924) on October 7 of that year at Bridgeport, Connecticut. The couple returned to the Kingdom of Hawaii in 1858, and had nine children, although one died young.

From 1860 to 1862 Baldwin served in the Kingdom House of Representatives. Around 1865 he became manager of the sugarcane plantation in Kohala on the northern coast of Hawaiiʻi Island. This plantation had been founded by the missionary Elias Bond.

In 1872 Baldwin and his family lived in New Haven, Connecticut, while he worked in the Yale Law School library and earned his Master of Arts degree. On his return to Hawaii he started an almost 40-year association with the education department of the Hawaiian government. He was vice-principal of Lahainaluna School from 1874 to 1877. While he was inspector-general of the schools from 1877 to 1885, instruction was changed from the Hawaiian language to English. Baldwin returned to Lahainaluna and served as vice-principal again until 1890.

In 1890 he moved to Haʻikū where his younger brother Henry Perrine Baldwin (1842–1911) had founded the agricultural venture Alexander & Baldwin with his brother-in-law Samuel Thomas Alexander (1836–1904). He organized a small school for the plantation employees. Baldwin had earlier published a list of Hawaiian mosses and liverworts (hepatic plants, or Hepaticae in Latin).

=== Malacology ===
In the 1890s he devoted much of his time to studying mollusks (malacology), specifically the study of Hawaiian land snails, some of which he named and described. In addition, several land snail species in the family Achatinellidae were named in honor of him, as well as a subgenus Baldwinia of the genus Partulina.

He produced the first catalog of Hawaiian land snails and freshwater snails in 1893. His schoolmate from Punahou, J. T. Gulick, had published early theories of evolution which were based on their mollusc shell collections.

In the Hawaiian language, the word for any kind of snail is pūpū. The same word also referred to small bits of fish, chicken, or banana relish served with kava. Because of the mixture of various cultures and cuisines in the islands, the word pupu became associated with any relish, appetizer, canapé, or hors d'oeuvre, and the modern pu pu platter.

=== Retirement and last years ===
Upon David Baldwin's retirement from teaching in 1903, the Baldwin brothers (David and Henry) invested in the first commercial cultivation of pineapple on Maui. Three years later, Belle Dickey, who was the niece of both a brother-in-law and a sister-in-law of Baldwin, married James Dole, who popularized Hawaiian pineapple.

After a cancer operation in February 1911, Baldwin died on June 16, 1912, at the Queen's Medical Center in Honolulu. His remains were shipped to Maui and buried at the Makawao Union Church cemetery.

== Legacy ==
=== Taxa named by him ===
Gastropods (land snails):

- Achatinella apexfulva cookei Baldwin, 1895
- Achatinella mustelina lymaniana Baldwin, 1895
- Newcombia canaliculata Baldwin, 1905
- Partulina dolei Baldwin, 1895
- Kauaia knudseni Baldwin, 1895

=== Taxa named in his honor ===
The following mollusks were named in honor of Baldwin.

Land snails:

- Nesopupa baldwini Ancey, 1904
- Leptachatina baldwini Cooke, 1910
- Pacificella baldwini
- Philonesia baldwini (Ancey, 1889)
- Nesophila baldwini
- Cecilioides baldwini (Ancey, 1892)
- Catinella baldwini (Ancey, 1889)
- Orobophana baldwini

Freshwater snails:

- Thiara baldwini (Ancey, 1899)

Sea snails:

- Mitra (Strigatella) baldwinii Melvill, 1899 is a synonym of Vexillum (Pusia) moelleri (Küster, 1840)
- Murex cyclostoma var. baldwiniana Pilsbry, 1921 is a synonym of Favartia (Favartia) garrettii (Pease, 1868)

Bivalves:

- Solecurtus baldwini Dall, Bartsch & Rehder, 1938

== Children ==
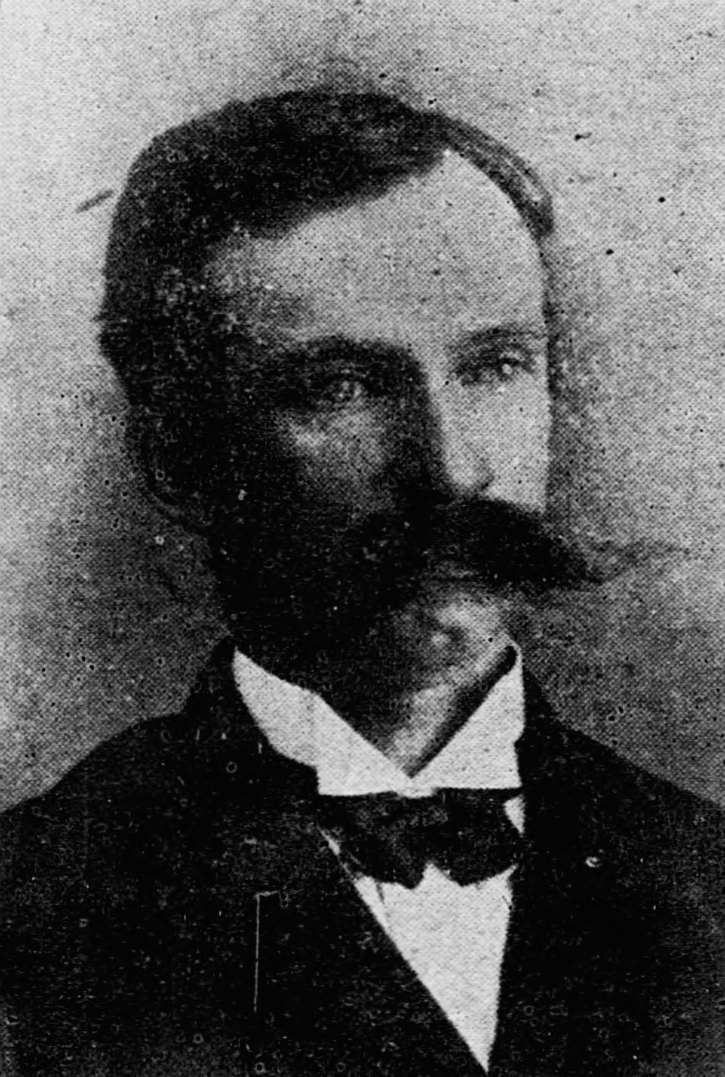
Lincoln Mansfield Baldwin

Daughter Lillian Baldwin (1858–1953) married Frank E. Atwater (1851–1919).

Son Erdman Dwight Baldwin was born December 9, 1859, married Nellie Virginia Curtis, became a Civil Engineer and died July 11, 1942. He surveyed Mauna Kea and published one of the first maps of its summit in 1891.

Son Charles Wickliffe Baldwin was born December 20, 1860. In 1909 he married Olive Elvira Steele (1873–1970) at Los Altos, California. He became a principal at various schools on Maui, and published a textbook on Hawaiian geography in 1908. His book was revised and republished several times.

Son Lincoln Mansfield Baldwin was born a twin of Winnifred Morris Baldwin on August 19, 1863. He married Ellen Melbourne Dickenson of Lahaina, daughter of Henry Dickenson Sr. and Mary Ann Caroline Rowley, on August 7, 1891, and had seven children. He worked for a while in the sugar business and a store. In 1894 he became deputy sheriff of Maui. In November 1896 he was appointed sheriff of Maui island, where he served for 14 years. In 1910 he became treasurer of Maui County, and died on November 18, 1919.

Son Benjamin Douglas Baldwin was born April 12, 1868, managed sugar plantations on Maui and Kauaʻi.

Son William Atwater Baldwin was born July 20, 1869, became manager of three different sugar plantations and then President of Haiku Fruit & Packing Company. In 1902 he married Mina Prime at Milwaukee, Wisconsin. The Baldwin holdings would eventually evolve into the Maui Land & Pineapple Company. Baldwin relatives were involved in the company until 2005.

Daughter Mary W. ("May") Baldwin (1871–1961) married Duncan Bell Murdoch (1860–1964). Daughter Winifred Morris Baldwin married Physician John Weddick in October 1896. Son Nathaniel Hewitt Baldwin was born in 1873 but died age six.

His snail collection was a featured display at the Bailey House Museum. Henry Augustus Pilsbry called Baldwin "the Nestor of Hawaiian conchologists".

=== Family tree ===
Alexander & Baldwin family tree

William P. Alexander (1805–1884)	Mary Ann McKinney (1810–1888)	Amos Starr Cooke (1810–1871)	Juliette Montague (1812–1896)	Dwight Baldwin (1798–1886)	Charlotte Fowler (1805–1873)	J. W. Smith (1810–1887
David Dwight Baldwin (1831–1912)	W. O. Smith (1848–1929)
William D. Alexander (1833–1913)	Abigail Baldwin (1847–1912)	Samuel T. Alexander (1836–1904)	Martha Eliza Cooke	Ann Elizabeth Alexander (1843–1940)	Henry P. Baldwin (1842–1911)	Emily Whitney Alexander (1846–1943)
Agnes Alexander (1875–1971)	Annie Montague Alexander (1867–1950)	C.W. Dickey (1871–1942)	Belle Dickey (1880–1972)	James Dole (1877–1958)	Henry Alexander Baldwin (1871–1946)	Ethel Frances Smith (1879–1967)
J. Walter Cameron (1895–1976)	Francis Baldwin (1904–1996)
Colin C. Cameron (1927–1992) (Kapalua)

== Works ==
- David Dwight Baldwin (1874). Record of books received in Law School since Jan. 1, 1874 through Oct. 28, 1874. Yale Law Library.
- D. D. Baldwin (1876). "List of Hawaiian Mosses and Hepaticae". In Thomas G. Thrum (ed.). Hawaiian Almanac and Annual for 1877. pp. 40–42. hdl:10524/658.
- D. D. Baldwin (1886). "The Land Shells of the Hawaiian Islands". In Thomas G. Thrum (ed.). Hawaiian Almanac and Annual for 1887. pp. 55–63.
- David Dwight Baldwin (1893). Catalogue of land and fresh water shells of the Hawaiian Islands. Press Publishing Company.
- D. D. Baldwin (May 1900). "The Land Shells of the Hawaiian Islands". Hawaii's Young People. Lahainaluna School Press.
- David Dwight Baldwin (1904). Family record of Rev. and Mrs. Dwight Baldwin: to August 1st, 1904.
