= Alexander & Baldwin =

American real estate and agriculture company

Alexander & Baldwin, Inc.
- Type: Private
- Traded as: NYSE: ALEX
- Industry: Real estate; Land operations; Materials and construction
- Founded: 1870; 156 years ago
- Founder: Samuel Thomas Alexander; Henry Perrine Baldwin
- Headquarters: Honolulu, Hawaii, U.S.
- Key people: Lance K. Parker; (president & CEO); Clayton Chun; (vice president & CFO)
- Revenue: ▼US$207 million (2025)
- Operating income: ▲US$80 million (2025)
- Net income: ▲US$65 million (2025)
- Total assets: ▼US$1.66 billion (2025)
- Total equity: ▼US$987 million (2025)
- Number of employees: 91 (2025)
- Website: alexanderbaldwin.com

Alexander & Baldwin (A&B) is an American commercial real estate operator focused on grocery-anchored retail and select commercial assets across Hawaii. A&B is the state's largest owner of neighborhood shopping centers. The company owns and manages approximately 4.0 million square feet of commercial space in Hawaii, including 21 retail centers, 14 industrial assets, four office properties, and 146 acres of ground lease holdings. Over its 155-year history, A&B has evolved with the state's economy and played a leadership role in the development of the agricultural, transportation, tourism, construction, residential and commercial real estate industries. A&B is privately held through a joint venture formed by MW Group, Blackstone Real Estate and DivcoWest.

== History ==
=== Before annexation ===
In 1831, Dwight Baldwin (1798–1886) and Charlotte Fowler Baldwin were sent by the American Board of Commissioners for Foreign Missions (ABCFM) as medical missionaries to the Hawaiian Islands. Reverend William Alexander and Mary McKinney Alexander arrived the following year.

Alexander & Baldwin was founded by their sons Samuel Thomas Alexander and Henry Perrine Baldwin (1842–1911) as Samuel T Alexander & Co., in 1870. The two purchased 561 acres (227 ha) of land on the island of Maui between Pāʻia and Makawao, on which they began to cultivate sugarcane.

The land the partners cultivated was semi-arid former dry forest, not ideal for growing sugarcane, a crop that required much water. Samuel Alexander realized that rain was plentiful miles away in the rainforests on the windward slopes of Haleakalā mountain. Thus, he designed a 17-mile (27 km) long irrigation aqueduct that diverted water from that part of Haleakalā to their plantation. Work started on the aqueduct in 1876 and was completed two years later in 1878.

After completion of the aqueduct, the company was eventually renamed Alexander & Baldwin Plantation. Between 1872 and 1900, the company took over more land and sugar mill operations. In 1898, Alexander and Baldwin purchased a controlling interest in one of its rival companies, Hawaiian Commercial & Sugar Company (HC&S) from Claus Spreckels. By 1899, the company had bought out Maui's two main railroad lines (Kahului Railroad Company and Maui Railroad & Steamship Company). In 1900, the company incorporated and was renamed Alexander & Baldwin, Ltd.

=== Big Five era ===
Following incorporation, the company continued to prosper. It came to be one of Hawaii's Big Five companies which held a virtual oligarchy over Hawaii's economy during the region's territorial years. In this period, the company entered many new businesses and controlled more than 100,000 acres (40,000 ha) of land in the Territory.

In 1905, Alexander & Baldwin and other Big Five companies took control of the California and Hawaiian Sugar Company (C&H), giving Alexander & Baldwin a factory where they could refine its sugar. Over the following decades, the company opened or bought out sugar operations at Puʻunene, Kahuku, and Kauaʻi island as well as pineapple operations on Maui and Kauaʻi.

In 1908, the company bought a portion of the Matson Navigation Company, a major shipping line operating in the territory. The company sold its sugar interests on Kauaʻi and consolidated all of its Maui operations into an enlarged Hawaii Commercial & Sugar Company in the 1930s while continuing its pineapple operations as well as its sugarcane plantation in Kahuku until the 1960s.

- Alexander and Baldwin Building
- U.S. National Register of Historic Places
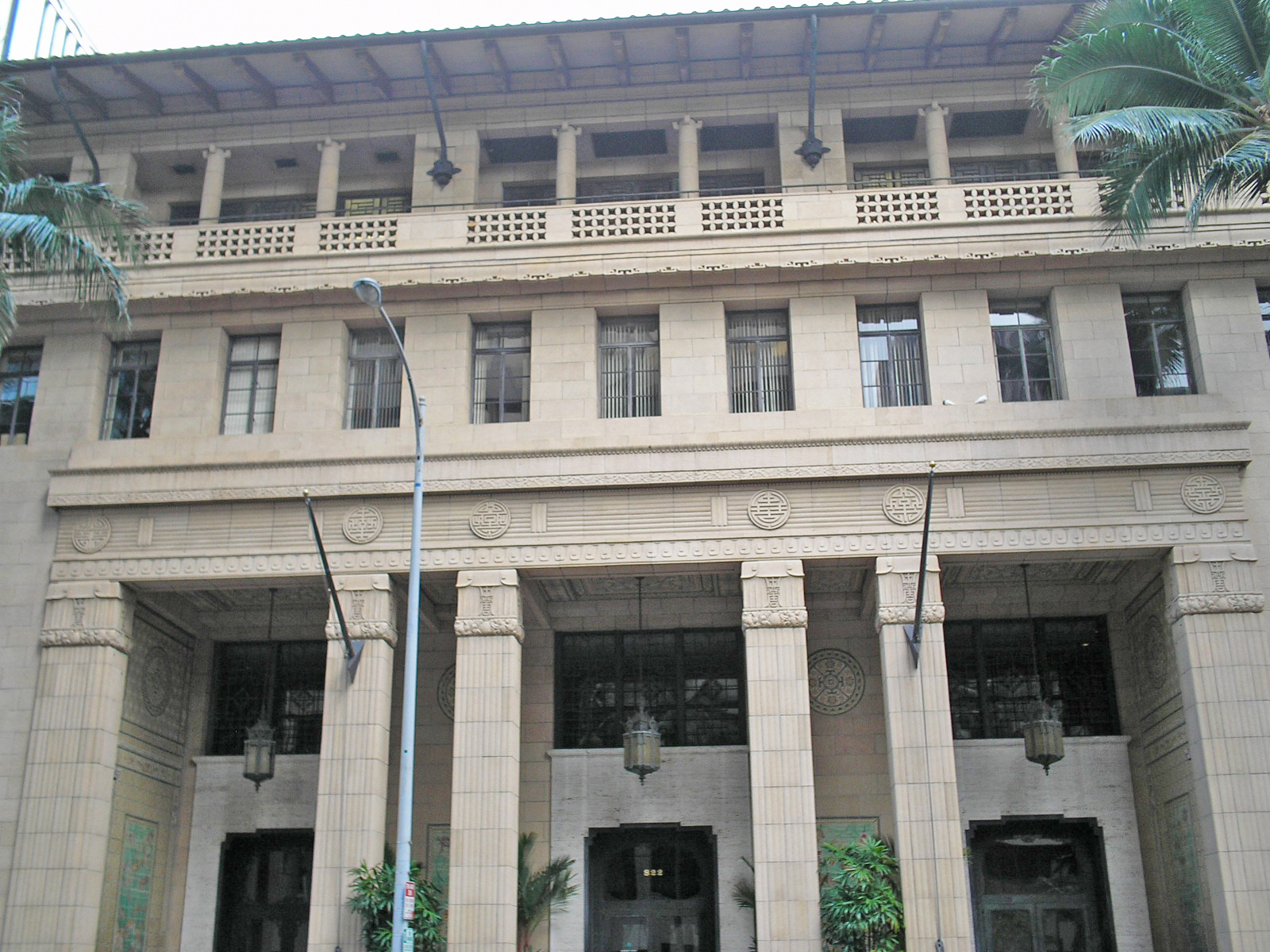
- Headquarters built in 1929

- Location within Hawaii
- Location: 822 Bishop Street, Honolulu, Hawaii
- Coordinates: 21°18′46″N 157°51′54″W
- Built: 1929
- Architect: Charles William Dickey, Hart Wood
- NRHP reference No.: 79000755
- Added to NRHP: September 7, 1979

Following World War II, the company entered a new business: land development and real estate. The company formed a new subsidiary, the Kahului Development Co., to develop housing in the Kahului area. In the following years, the company became more involved in the development of its land and the Kahului Development Co. became A&B Properties, Inc.

In 1962, the company purchased all outstanding interests in the Hawaii Commercial & Sugar Company and the sugar operation became wholly owned by Alexander & Baldwin. In 1964, the company also bought out the interests in Matson Navigation Company held by three of its fellow "Big Five" competitors: American Factors, C. Brewer & Co., and Castle & Cooke. In 1969, the company purchased all remaining, outstanding shares in Matson and the shipping company became a wholly owned subsidiary of Alexander & Baldwin.

=== Diversification ===
In recent decades, the company's development and real estate division has grown as A&B Properties developed new residential and commercial projects on other land the company owned. In addition, Alexander & Baldwin entered diversified agriculture, beginning to cultivate coffee and macadamia nuts in the 1980s.

=== Matson spinoff ===
In 2012 the Matson Navigation Company, in which the Alexander & Baldwin had held an investment for 140 years and gained full ownership of in 1969, was spun off as the independent Matson, Inc. company with its headquarters moving from Oakland, California to Honolulu.

=== End of sugar production ===
On January 6, 2016, Alexander & Baldwin announced plans to transition out of sugar farming on Maui, discontinuing the Maui Sugar brand and ceasing production of sugar at the last remaining plantation on the Hawaiian islands. The company's last sugar mill closed in December of that year. Alexander & Baldwin had planned on transforming its Hawaiian Commercial & Sugar Company division into diversified agriculture on smaller farms. However, in December 2018, they announced the sale of their former HC&S lands on Maui to Mahi Pono, LLC, who would continue to develop diversified agriculture on these lands. As of 2025, Alexander & Baldwin's primary business is commercial real estate in the state of Hawaii.

On December 8, 2025, Alexander & Baldwin announced a merger agreement with a partnership led by MW Group and investment funds affiliated with Blackstone Real Estate and DivcoWest. The group will acquire all shares of A&B stock for $2.3 billion. The acquisition was completed in March 2026.

== Criticism ==
Before ceasing sugar production in 2016, Alexander & Baldwin had drawn repeated criticism from Maui residents over the use of pre-harvest field burning by its subsidiary Hawaiian Commercial & Sugar Company. HC&S had cultivated up to 35,000 acres of sugarcane on Maui, with roughly 400 acres per week being burned from March to November each year to remove dried leaves from the cane before it is harvested and processed. A spokesman for HC&S claimed that "burning, in the field, is the only economical means HC&S has found to-date of removing the dried leafy material from its crop." Maui environmentalists and physicians countered by asserting that the burning process caused increased rates of asthma and respiratory disease, especially among children, released carcinogens from burning PVC pipes used in the irrigation system, and resulted in highway closures and car crashes. Community organizers called on A&B to replace burning with green harvesting methods, and in 2012, presented the Hawaii Department of Health with a petition signed by 8,700 Maui residents, asking it to deny the company a burning permit for the coming year.

The company's Puunene Mill had also attracted criticism from residents, who pointed out that its equipment did not meet federal emissions standards and that its high coal consumption produced unsafe levels of sulfur dioxide.

Some activists had reported receiving threats from or being assaulted by HC&S employees and members of the International Longshore and Warehouse Union, which had been active in lobbying for continued cane burning on behalf of Alexander & Baldwin.

The company's agricultural practices, as well as its history and the careers of its missionary founders, were satirized by Maui author Tim Parise in the novel Totum Hominem.

== See also ==
- Economy of Hawaii

== Alexander & Baldwin family tree ==
Alexander & Baldwin family tree

William P. Alexander (1805–1884)	Mary Ann McKinney (1810–1888)	Amos Starr Cooke (1810–1871)	Juliette Montague (1812–1896)	Dwight Baldwin (1798–1886)	Charlotte Fowler (1805–1873)	J. W. Smith (1810–1887
David Dwight Baldwin (1831–1912)	W. O. Smith (1848–1929)
William D. Alexander (1833–1913)	Abigail Baldwin (1847–1912)	Samuel T. Alexander (1836–1904)	Martha Eliza Cooke	Ann Elizabeth Alexander (1843–1940)	Henry P. Baldwin (1842–1911)	Emily Whitney Alexander (1846–1943)
Agnes Alexander (1875–1971)	Annie Montague Alexander (1867–1950)	C.W. Dickey (1871–1942)	Belle Dickey (1880–1972)	James Dole (1877–1958)	Henry Alexander Baldwin (1871–1946)	Ethel Frances Smith (1879–1967)
J. Walter Cameron (1895–1976)	Francis Baldwin (1904–1996)
Colin C. Cameron (1927–1992) (Kapalua)
