= Volcano Block Building =

Historic Place in Hawaii County, Hawaii

- U.S. National Register of Historic Places
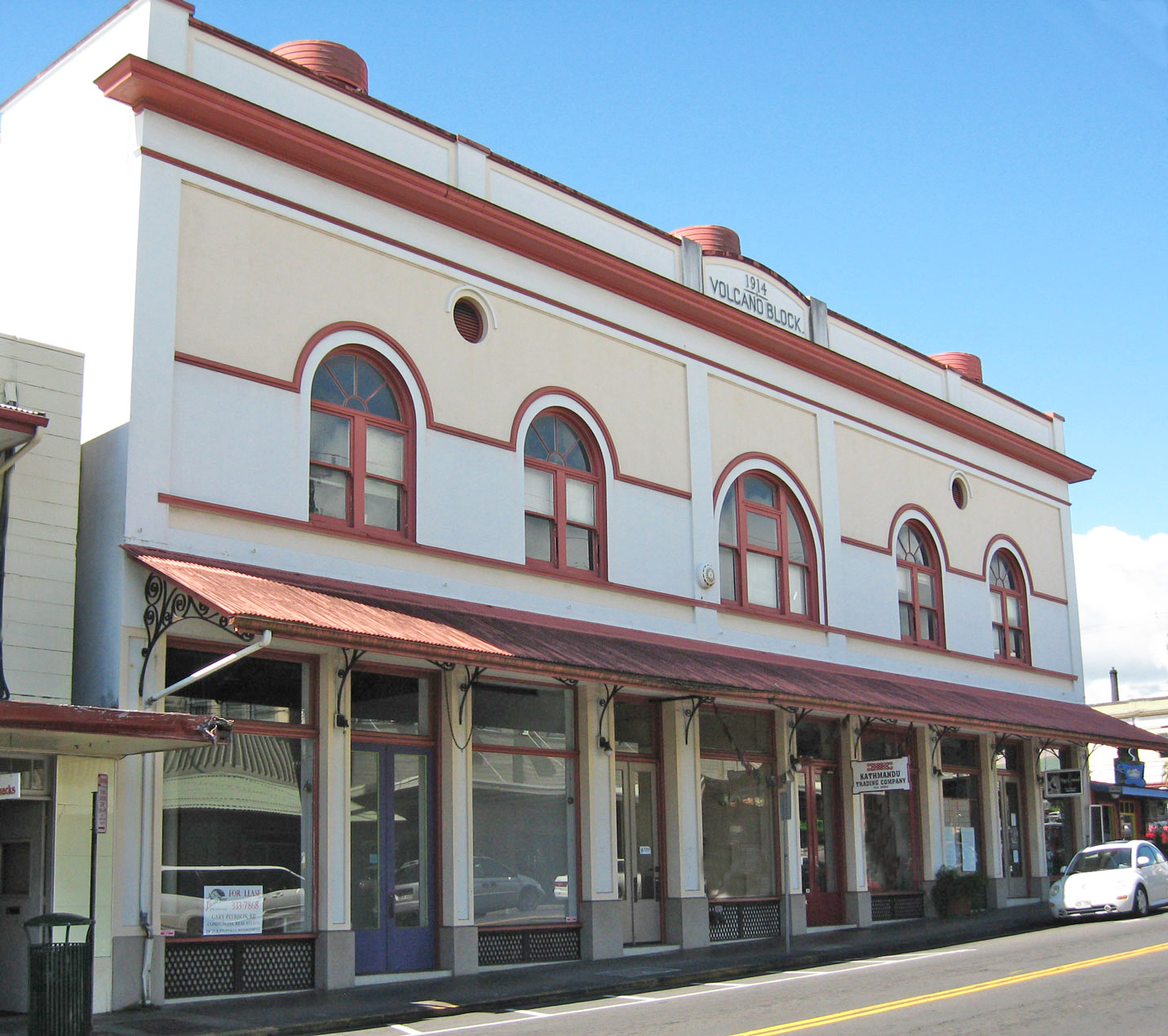

- Location within Hawaii
- Location: 27-37 Waianuenue Avenue, Hilo, Hawaii
- Coordinates: 19°43′34.4″N 155°5′14.2″W
- Built: 1914
- Architectural style: Italian Renaissance
- NRHP reference No.: 92001748
- Added to NRHP: January 7, 1993

The Volcano Block Building is a historic structure in Hilo, Hawaii built in 1914.

== History ==
Completed in 1914, this two story commercial building of reinforced concrete in the Italian Renaissance style is representative of the major structures built in Hilo between 1910 and 1915 as the city grew to be the second largest commercial center in the Hawaiian Islands. Measuring approximately 60 feet by 90 feet and fronting on Waianuenue Avenue, the structure occupies the site of the former Volcano Stables. Three retail spaces on the ground floor each have separate store fronts. The entry stair to the second floor office spaces is located between the first and second retail spaces at the East side. Three separate full basements are located below these spaces. It was the first building built in Hilo to house multiple businesses in the same structure, and the first not constructed for its owner's occupancy.

A vault on the ground floor was probably constructed by the first tenant in the space, the Peoples Bank of Hilo when they opened on September 1, 1916. Another notable tenant was the C. Brewer & Co., which had purchased the Pepeekeo Sugar Company in 1904.

The Hilo Masonic Hall was another of the few fireproof buildings built just a few years earlier and a block away, in 1910. The only earlier commercial building that survives in Hilo is the S. Hata Building, built in 1912 by the brother of a board member of the Peoples Bank. The Hilo Federal Building was also built in this part of Hilo in 1915. In 1922 the first bank disaster in Hawaii caused the Peoples Bank to shut down. The "big five" corporations controlled by descendants of early American missionaries, might have been a factor in its demise. Although known for the sugar industry, major banks were also controlled by the same families. These include the Bishop Bank which opened in Hilo in 1910 (now First Hawaiian Bank), and First Bank of Hilo which opened in 1906 (now part of Bank of Hawaii).

In 1929 the building was purchased by C. Brewer for their subsidiary Hilo Terminal and Transportation Company there until 1953 when they moved to the Hilo Pier and the parent company moved its Hilo corporate offices into the building. During this period the Hilo Chamber of Commerce used the second floor of the building. In 1961, upon completion of the C. Brewer Building in Honolulu as corporate offices, C. Brewer sold the building to Irving Melnick, a clothing manufacturer, who owned the structure until his death, when it passed to the living Melnick Trust. Coyne Mattress Company purchased the property in 1992, the owners as of 2009.

The building was listed as state historic site 10-35-7507 on September 28, 1992, and added to the National Register of Historic Places listings on the island of Hawaii on January 7, 1993 as site 92001748.
