= Hilo Masonic Lodge Hall–Bishop Trust Building =

Historic Place in Hawaii County, Hawaii

- Hilo Masonic Lodge Hall– Bishop Trust Building
- U.S. National Register of Historic Places
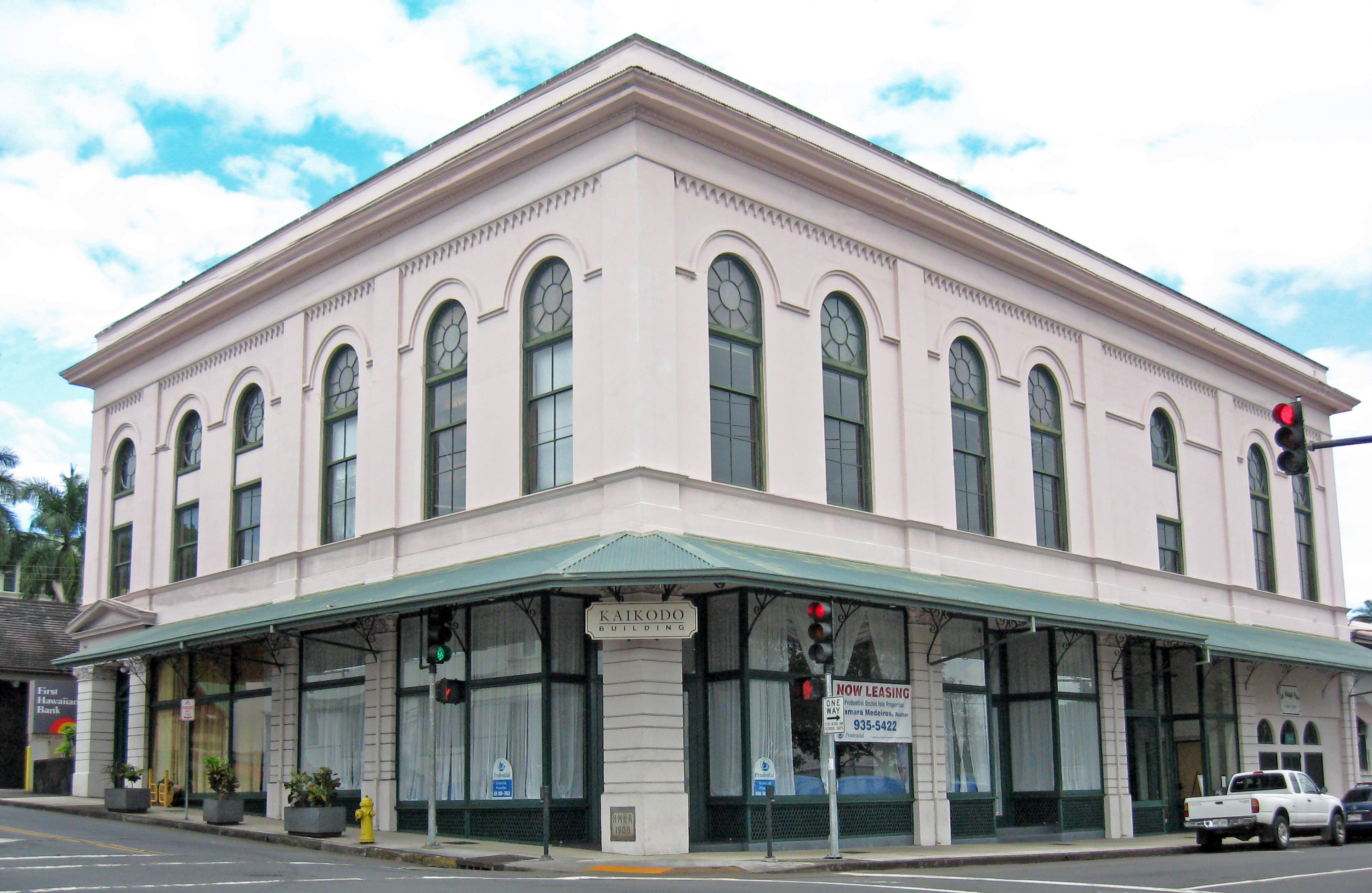
- Vacant first floor in 2009

- Location within Hawaii
- Location: Keawe and Waianuenue Streets, Hilo, Hawaii
- Coordinates: 19°43′33″N 155°5′17″W
- Area: 0.9 acres (0.36 ha)
- Built: 1908–1910
- Architect: Henry F. Starbuck
- Architectural style: Renaissance Revival
- NRHP reference No.: 94000383
- Added to NRHP: April 21, 1994

Hilo Masonic Lodge Hall, also known as the Bishop Trust Building, is a historic structure in Hilo, Hawaii constructed between 1908 and 1910. It was designed to house commercial space on the ground floor and a meeting hall for a local Masonic lodge on the second floor. The Masons stayed until around 1985.

== History ==
The Masonic Lodge in Hilo was founded in 1896 at the home of William W. Goodale. On October 15, 1897 Kilauea Lodge #330 was officially chartered. Named for the nearby active Kīlauea volcano, it was the first Masonic lodge on Hawaiʻi Island. John Troup Moir (1859–1933) manager of the Onomea sugarcane plantation in Papaikou, Hawaii, was master of the lodge. He was also the first chairman of the board of supervisors for the County of Hawaii. A delegation from the Grand Lodge of California officially presented Kīlauea lodge with its charter in February 1898.

The lodge met in a room of a building owned by Frederick S. Lyman, son of early Hilo missionaries Sarah Joiner and David Belden Lyman. The Lyman building was on leased land, so an association (with Moir as president) was formed to purchase a lot uphill from the town, assuming urban Hilo would grow in that direction. The association raised most of what they thought a building would cost by October 1900. When a federal building was being planned in Hilo around the same time, the lodge proposed swapping their land for a corner of the federal lot, but public protests prevented the deal at first. By January 1906 they were successful in arranging a deal with Territorial Governor George R. Carter to swap their land (desired for a school) for a more central parcel, paying the difference in value.

Based on a sketch by freemason William McKay (1841–1909), architects were interviewed in Honolulu and the mainland. Henry F. Starbuck of Oakland, California was selected to design the building. He was a freemason and had designed several other lodges and churches. Harold Vaughan Patten was given as "architect" in one account, but he probably served to supervise the financial aspects of the project since he was an accountant. Plans were ready to be finalized at the end of March 1906. Construction was scheduled to begin in July when leases expired on the land which they were purchasing from the territory.

The 1906 San Francisco earthquake struck less than a month later, before construction could begin. Rebuilding of San Francisco after the resulting fire caused building materials to become scarce and more expensive, causing delays and cost over-runs on the Hilo project. Finally ground was broken in May 1908. In June Starbuck traveled to Hilo to oversee construction with workers he had selected. After a few months Starbuck and the workers were dismissed; Fred Harrison from Honolulu became construction contractor. The cornerstone was laid February 18, 1909. The dedication ceremony was held on February 24, 1910. Construction cost ended up being double what had been planned. At the ceremony Moir said "nothing but the best would satisfy the boys" and called it "a substantial, fireproof, earthquakeproof, up-to-date building, first class in every respect, a credit to the town of Hilo and the Territory of Hawaii."

It was completed about the same time as the Volcano Block Building and S. Hata Buildings within a few blocks in downtown Hilo. Just to the south, Kalakaua Park serves as the town square, flanked by the historic District Courthouse and Police Station and Hilo Federal Building finished a few years later.

The 28,000-square-foot (2,600 m^{2}) building was built of reinforced concrete in the Renaissance Revival style. It had three floors and a full basement. From the lobby, an elaborate granite stairway with an ornate oak balustrade leads to the second and third floors. The roof formerly held a garden. The second floor consisted of a foyer, a ceremonial temple room of about 35 feet (11 m) by 55 feet (17 m), and a banquet room about the same size. The temple included high ceilings with cast brass suspended lighting fixtures and an organ gallery.

The Masonic order used the second and third floors as a temple until about 1985, when they were forced out: the Masonic order's rules did not allow them to share occupancy with a liquor establishment, but a liquor license was issued to the ground floor tenant.

== Restoration ==
The building was purchased by Toyama Hawaii, Inc. in 1992. It was added to the state registry of historic places on June 28, 1993 as site 10-35-7508, and added to the National Register of Historic Places listings on the island of Hawaii on April 21, 1994 as site 94000383.

The building's ground floor has had various tenants. Bishop Bank (now First Hawaiian Bank) used the ground floor before moving to their own building. A 1990s restoration effort rebuilt modern restrooms and added an elevator, using some original and salvaged materials. Howard and Mary Ann Rogers (as the Kaikodo Building, LLC) bought the building in 2001 and opened the Kaikodo restaurant in the ground floor in 2003. Their plans were to open an Asian art gallery on the second floor after a further remodel. The Rogers were former art researchers who had previously opened a gallery in New York City. After a struggle to be profitable, it was closed for four months and reorganized in 2005. Kaikodo closed in August 2007 and the building was put up for sale. A restaurant on the first floor was re-opened in 2009 as "Uncle Don's Ohana Grill" but closed less than a year later.

The building is located on the northwest corner of Keawe (originally known as Bridge Street) and Waianuenue Streets in Hilo, Hawaii, (address 60 Keawe Street). The Kilauea lodge is one of two on the island in 2023, as it was in 2010; the other in 2023 is the Kona Lodge F. & A.M., at Kailua Kona, Hawaii.
