= S. Hata Building =

Historic Place in Hawaii County, Hawaii, United States

- U.S. National Register of Historic Places
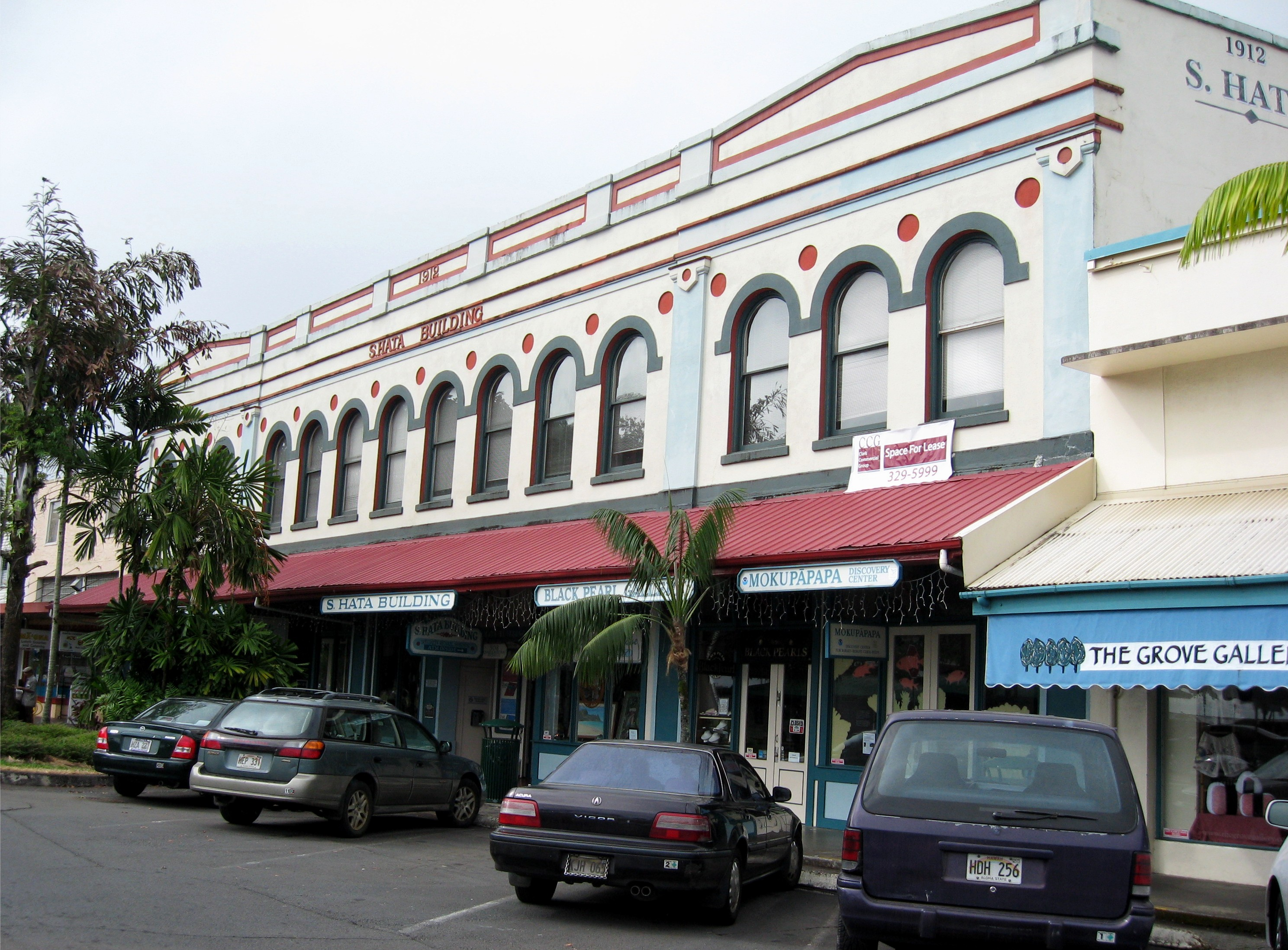
- Built for Hata Sadanosuke

- Location within Hawaii
- Location: 308 Kamehameha Avenue, Hilo, Hawaii
- Coordinates: 19°43′25″N 155°5′5″W
- Built: 1912
- Architect: William C. Furer
- Architectural style: Early Commercial
- NRHP reference No.: 91001087
- Added to NRHP: August 27, 1991

The S. Hata Building is a historic structure in Hilo, Hawaii built by Japanese businessman Hata Sadanosuke (1868 - ?) in 1912. It now contains specialty shops, professional offices, and a Cafe Pesto restaurant.

== Hata family ==
Hata Sadanosuke was born in Hiroshima, Japan in 1868 and immigrated to Honolulu, Hawaii in 1891. In 1893, Mr. Hata worked as an agent for Odo Shoten in Honolulu ("shoten" means "store" in Japanese), responsible for taking orders from large sugarcane plantations on the Hāmākua Coast which employed many Japanese immigrant workers. This gave him the inspiration to start his own business at Hilo on the Big Island on January 3, 1896 called S. Hata Shoten, Limited. He sold Japanese silks, kimono, as well as eastern souvenirs and provisions. Business was slow in the first years, so he hired out his horse and hackney carriage as a taxicab for visitors.

After the annexation by the United States to become the Territory of Hawaii in 1898, the plantations flourished, as did his business. He moved to a larger building at the corner of Mamo and Keawe streets. He branched out back to Honolulu and Hiroshima, Osaka, Japan, Kyoto, Japan, and Yokohama, Japan.

Hata Yoichi, Sadanosuke's younger brother (born 1884) also arrived in Hilo and worked as bookkeeper at S. Hata Shoten. The business was so prosperous in 1912 that it needed more space. The previous building became a wholesale food distributing outlet run by Hata Yoichi. Sadanosuke planned a new $25,000 structure on wetlands on Front Street (later renamed Kamehameha Avenue) near the railroad tracks to the plantations. A condition of the United States government's selling this land was that Mr. Hata builds concrete building within a year's time.

=== Building ===
At the time it was built, almost all other structures in Hawai'i outside of Honolulu were built of wood. The building is about 109 feet (33 m) by 60 feet (18 m) of reinforced concrete. Such a large masonry building indicated the upward mobility of the Japanese population. The Hilo Masonic Lodge, Hilo Federal Building and Volcano Block Building are the others from that period that remain. The first floor has several store-fronts. A wooden staircase leads to a second floor of office space, with 14 arched windows. In 1913 he opened the Hilo Sake Brewing Company. In 1919 two wood structures were added to the back, one commercial and one residential.

After the attack on Pearl Harbor the Hata family was part of the Japanese American internment. In September 1942 (during the Second World War) the Hata Building was seized and later auctioned by the U.S. government. Hata's second daughter, Kagawa Kasujiro, purchased the building at that time. Because it was so solidly built, it survived the tsunami caused by the April 1, 1946 Aleutian Islands earthquake that devastated much of Hilo. The train tracks of the Hawaii Consolidated Railway were destroyed in that tsunami, so the building now is on the commercial street nearest the ocean. The path of the railroad was used for the new Hawaii Belt Road (state route 19), called the Waterfront Highway at this point.

The 18,650-square-foot (1,733 m^{2}) building originally had a full basement, but it was filled in following another major tsunami from the 1960 Valdivia earthquake. Its condition deteriorated and by 1990 it was scheduled to be demolished. David Levenson bought the property from Hata's descendants, renovated the interior while restoring the exterior, and rented it to a number of local businesses. The metal awning between the two stories was replaced, but the wrought iron brackets were restored. It is located at 308 Kamehameha Avenue, coordinates 19°43′25″N 155°5′5″W.

The Hilo Farmers Market was started on this block in 1988, held every Wednesday and Saturday at the end of Mamo Street. The building was listed as state historic site 10-35-7420 on January 14, 1989 and added to the National Register of Historic Places listings on the island of Hawaii on August 27, 1991 as site 91001087. The family formed the Sadanosuke Hata Charitable Foundation in 1999 which supports the Japanese Cultural Center of Hawaii in Honolulu. In 2003 the building was sold to the Takeyama family.

=== Yoichi Hata ===
Yoichi Hata married Naeko Hirata in 1905, and they had 8 sons and 1 daughter. These include Susumu (1917–2003), Yukiko (1918–2000), Minoru, Akira, Yoshimi, Frank J. and others. He became a director of the newly formed Peoples Bank of Hilo on September 1, 1916. The Y. Hata company was incorporated as a separate entity in 1922, and is still run by a descendant. Branches were opened in Osaka in 1936 and Honolulu in 1937. After the 1960 tsunami, the original wholesale building on Ponahawai Street was abandoned, and offices were moved to a new industrial area, 300 Kanoelehua Avenue in Hilo, and 285 Sand Island Road in Honolulu. In addition to food distribution to markets across the Hawaiian islands, restaurant supplies and chef services are now offered. They are also the major supplier to the U.S. military in Hawaii. Yoichi's son Minoru was CEO from the 1960s until the late 90s and then Yoichi's son Frank was chairman until 2008, and Frank's son Russell Hata took over in May, 2008.

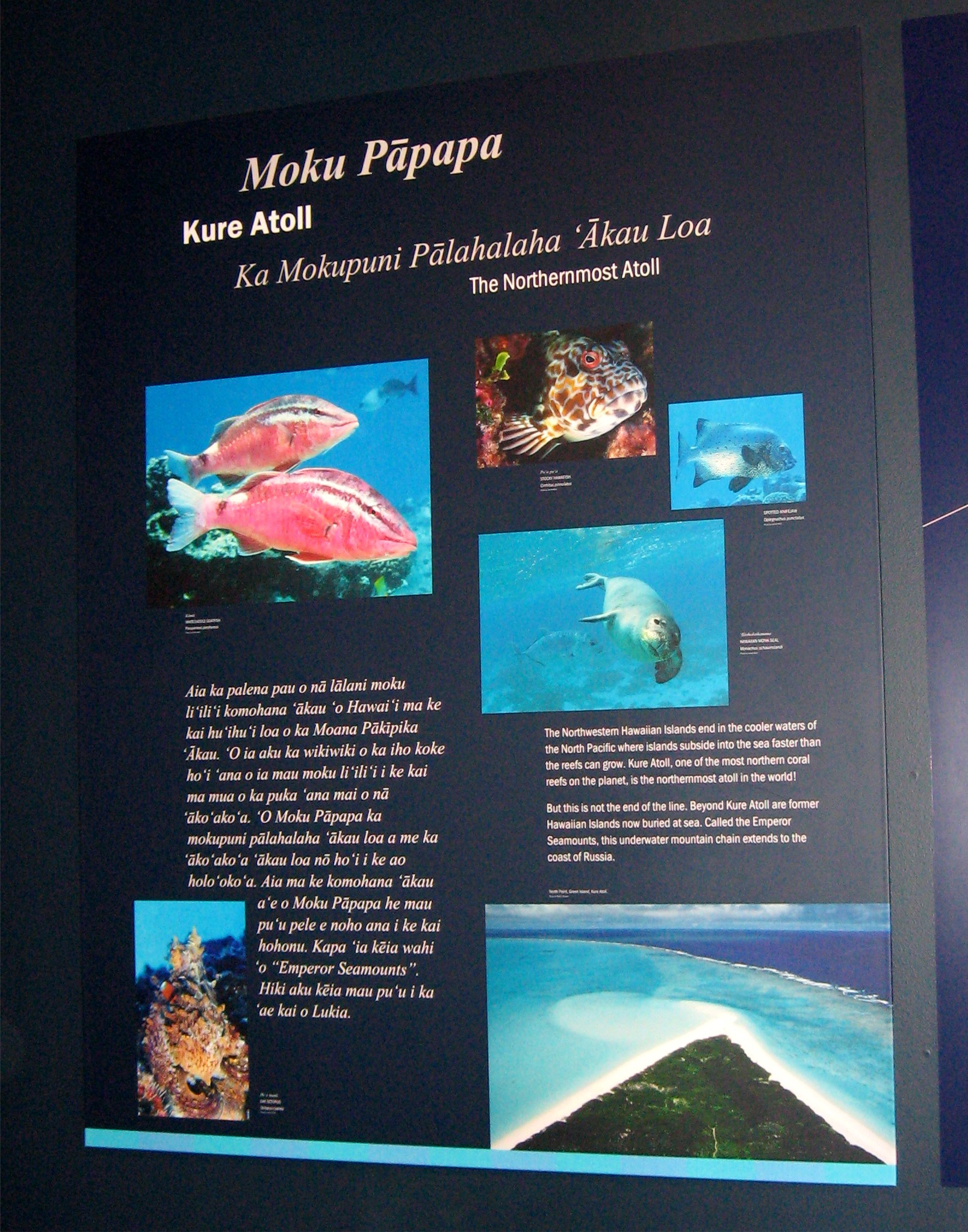
An exhibit at the discovery center

== Mokupāpapa Discovery Center ==
The Mokupāpapa Discovery Center has moved down the street into the historical Koehnen Building (76 Kamehameha Ave., Hilo, HI).

In May 2003, the Mokupāpapa Discovery Center opened in the restored S. Hata building. It displays educational interactive exhibits on the Leeward Islands, which are protected along with their surrounding waters as the Papahānaumokuākea Marine National Monument. The name comes from Mokupāpapa in the Hawaiian language which means "flat/low reef island". This name was used in chants of Ancient Hawaii, perhaps referring to the area now known as French Frigate Shoals, or the northwestern islands in general. The Northwestern islands stretch for hundreds of miles northwest of the main Hawaiian Islands; the discovery center is on the southeasternmost island in the chain, Hawai'i Island, which is the youngest and farthest away from the much older kūpuna islands in the Monument.

A 3,500-US-gallon (13,000 L) salt-water aquarium displays some of the fish found on Hawaiian reefs. One entire wall is covered by a large mural painted by local artist Layne Luna depicting the coral reef ecosystems found in the leeward islands. Layne Luna also created several life-sized models of life sized sharks, fish and manta ray that hang from the ceiling. Another exhibit plays a recording of the creation chant of Hawaiian mythology known as Kumulipo. Signs are in the Hawaiian language and English.

Admission to the new center is still free although donations are accepted to support all of the National Marine Sanctuaries. It is open Tuesday through Saturday 9AM to 4PM, closed on Federal holidays.
