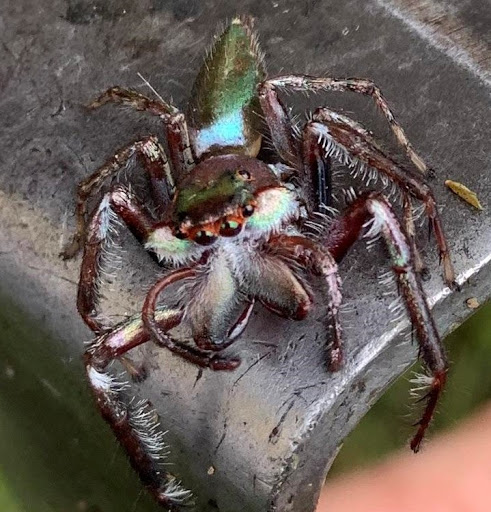
- In Hawaii

Scientific classification
- Kingdom: Animalia
- Phylum: Arthropoda
- Subphylum: Chelicerata
- Class: Arachnida
- Order: Araneae
- Infraorder: Araneomorphae
- Family: Salticidae
- Genus: Ascyltus
- Species: A. pterygodes

Binomial name
- Ascyltus pterygodes Koch, 1865

= Ascyltus pterygodes =

Species of spider

Ascyltus pterygodes is a cosmopolitan jumping spider of the Pacific. The spider belongs to the genus Ascyltus, a group of jumping spiders identified by their relatively large size and the iridescent scales on their carapace.

== Description ==
A. pterygodes are large to very large specimens. In addition to iridescent scales on the antero-lateral carapace A. pterygodes have very large and prominent cheek areas with their chelicerae distended forward. Other identifying features include the absence of lateral spines on the first metatarsi, three rows of eyes, and a large multicusped tooth.

== Behavior ==
A. pterygodes are a rare sighting during most parts of the year but seem to go into hiding during the spring where none were found to be observed.

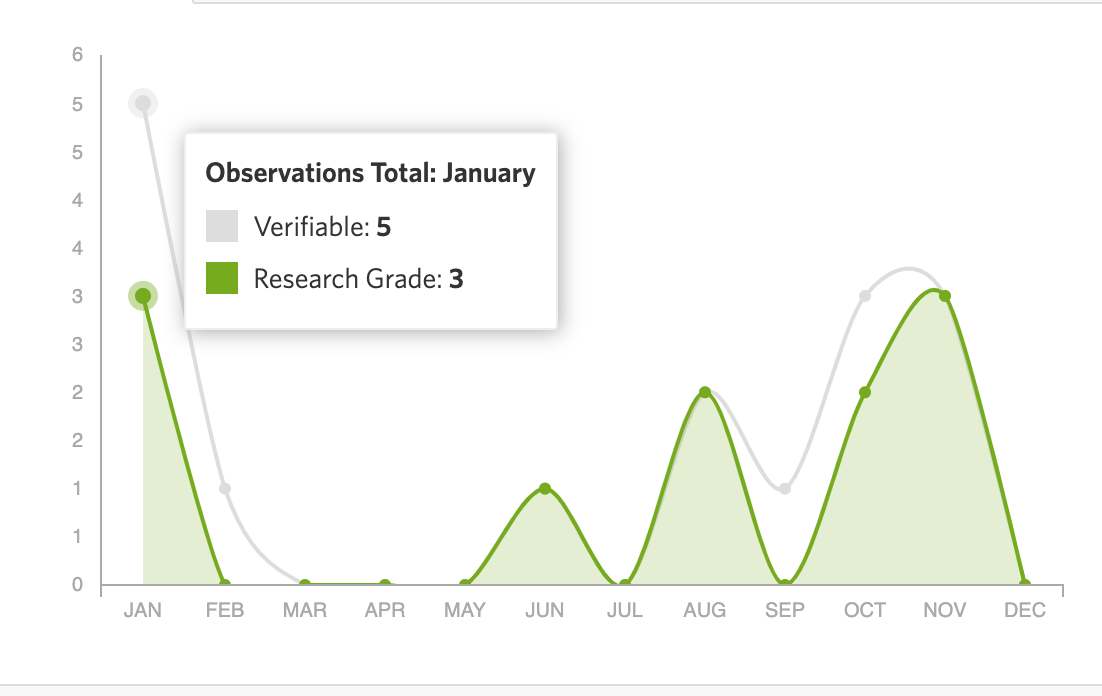

== Diet ==
A. pterygodes will not limit itself to just insects, rather it will even eat its own kind. Ascyltus pterygodes is also known to control the outbreak of coconut moths in Fiji.

“It is my impression that this jumping spider or a relative was once cited as being of considerable economic importance as a control agent. It is said to be a predator on a certain moth in the Fiji Islands that does great damage to the coconut palms."

== Habitat ==
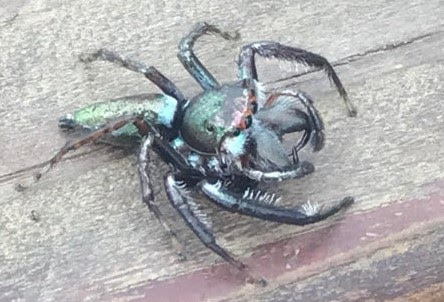
A. pterygodes photographed in Maui, HI

Many found specimens of A. pterygodes have been found in the Laupāhoehoe area. This area includes forests composed of ‘ohi‘a and koa. These forests are wet and mountainous regions with some being poorly drained portions. Due to this, they contain wet grasslands and small montane lakes with numerous streams running throughout the forests. Laupahoehoe is located in the North Hilo District on the island of Hawaii and stretches from just above 1,600 feet to about 4,600 feet elevation. Hakalau National Wildlife Refuge is adjacent to Laupahoehoe Reserve and protects habitats for local wildlife A. pterygodes has been spotted on leaves and bushes. These include common shrubs and plants like banana. They have also been found inside homes, but this occurrence is not a common one.

== Taxonomy ==
Kingdom Animalia (Animals)

Phylum Arthropoda (Arthropods)

Subphylum Chelicerata (Chelicerates)

Class Arachnida (Arachnids)

Order Araneae (Spiders)

Infraorder Araneomorphae (True Spiders)

No Taxon (Entelegynae)

Family Salticidae (Jumping Spiders)

Classification within the spiders (Araneae)

A. pterygodes is part of the order Araneae family Salticidae, and the genus Ascyltus. Ascyltus pterygodes is the type species of its genus, being the first one described by Ludwig Carl Christian Koch.

== Name ==
Previously named Hyllus pterygodes by L. Koch, the spider was placed into Ascyltus in 1878 by F. Karsch.
