= Sugar plantations in Hawaii =

Overview of sugarcane production in Hawaii

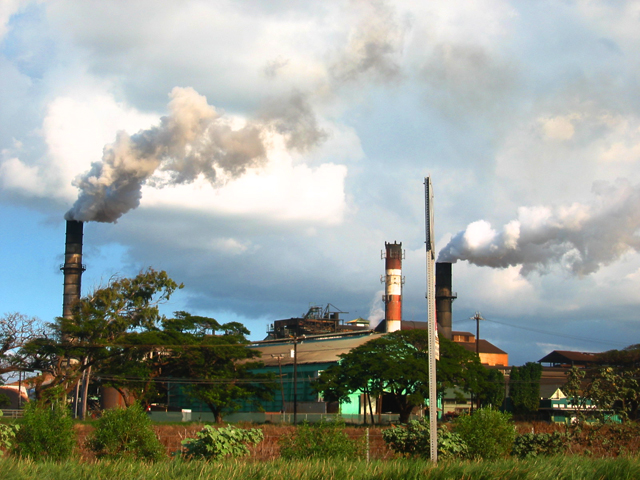
Hawaiian Commercial & Sugar Company's Puunene mill on Maui was the last operating sugar mill in Hawaiʻi

Sugarcane was introduced to Hawaiʻi by its first inhabitants in approximately 600 AD and was observed by Captain Cook upon arrival in the islands in 1778. Sugar quickly turned into a big business and generated rapid population growth in the islands with 337,000 people immigrating over the span of a century. The sugar grown and processed in Hawaiʻi was shipped primarily to the United States and, in smaller quantities, globally. Sugarcane and pineapple plantations were the largest employers in Hawaiʻi. Sugar production ended in 2016, with a small quantity of sugarcane still being grown for the manufacture of Rhum agricole.

== Origins ==
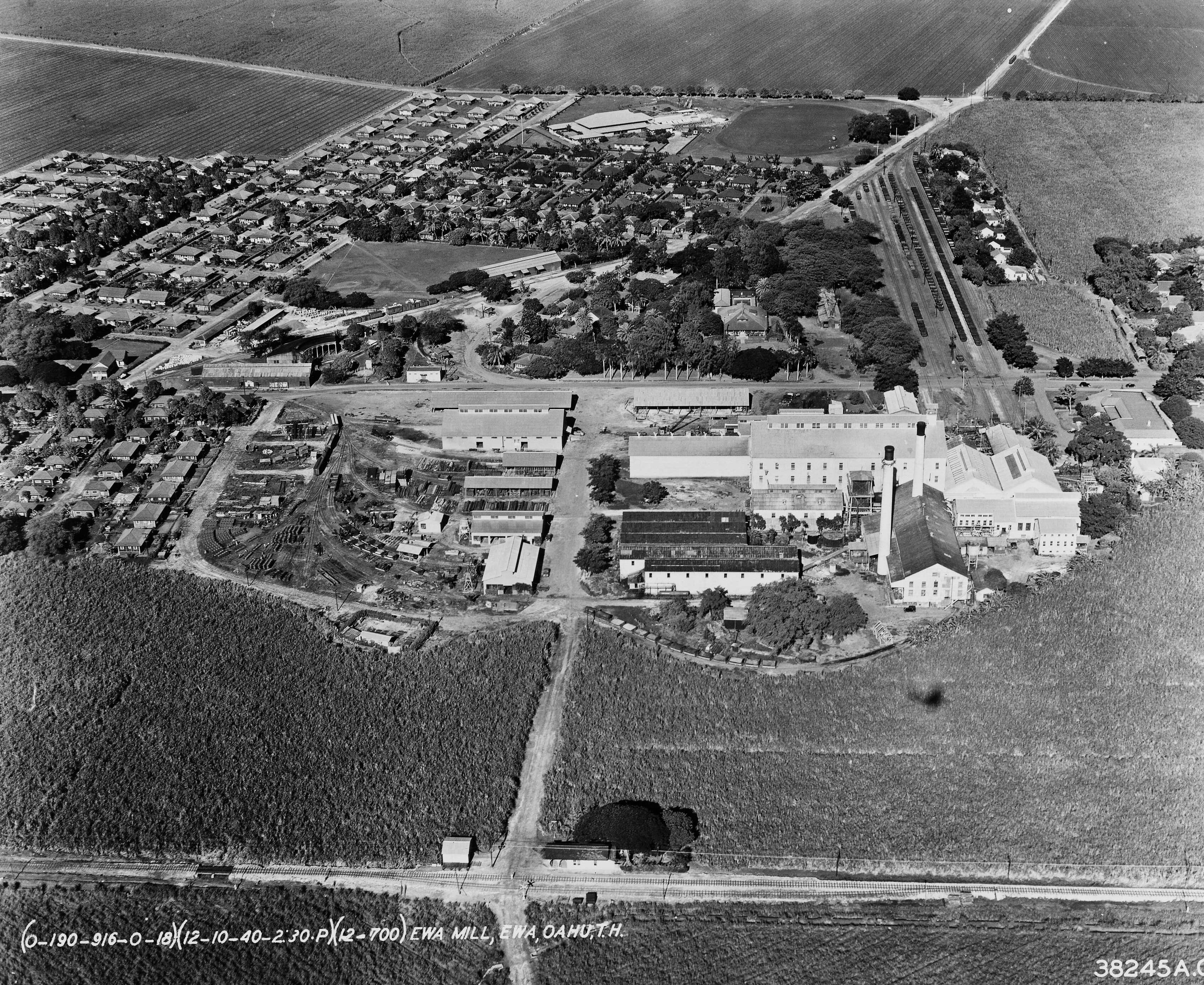
Ewa Sugar Mill, 1940

Sugarcane was introduced to Hawaiʻi by Polynesians in approximately 600 AD and was observed by Captain Cook upon arrival in the islands in 1778. They selected varieties that grew well across the broad spectrum of habitats in Hawaiʻi. Industrial sugar production started slowly in Hawaiʻi. The first sugar mill was created on the island of Lānaʻi in 1802 by an unidentified Chinese man who returned to China in 1803. The Old Sugar Mill, established in 1835 by Ladd & Co., is the site of the first sugar plantation. In 1836 the first 8,000 pounds (3,600 kg) of sugar and molasses was shipped to the United States. The plantation town of Koloa, was established adjacent to the mill.

By the 1840s sugarcane plantations gained a foothold in Hawaiian agriculture. Steamships provided rapid and reliable transportation to the islands, and demand increased during the California Gold Rush. The land division law of 1848 (known as the Great Māhele) displaced Hawaiian people from their land, forming the basis for the sugarcane plantation economy. In 1850, the law was amended to allow foreign residents to buy and lease land. In 1850, when California attained statehood, profits declined and the number of plantations decreased to five due to the import tariff that was instituted. Market demand increased even further during the onset of the American Civil War which prevented Southern sugar from being shipped northward. The price of sugar rose 525% from 4 cents per pound in 1861 to 25 cents in 1864. The Reciprocity Treaty of 1875 allowed Hawaiʻi to sell sugar to the United States without paying duties or taxes, greatly increasing plantation profits. This treaty also guaranteed that all of the resources including land, water, human labor power, capital, and technology would be thrown behind sugarcane cultivation. The 1890 McKinley Tariff Act, an effort by the United States government to decrease the competitive pricing of Hawaiian sugar, paid 2 cents per pound to mainland producers. After significant lobbying efforts, this act was repealed in 1894. By 1890, 75% of all Hawaiʻi privately held land was owned by foreign businessmen.

== Sugar and the Big Five ==
The industry was tightly controlled by descendants of missionary families and other businessmen, concentrated in corporations known in Hawaiʻi as the "Big Five". These included Castle & Cooke, Alexander & Baldwin, C. Brewer & Co., H. Hackfeld & Co. (later named American Factors (now Amfac)) and Theo H. Davies & Co., which together eventually gained control over other aspects of the Hawaiian economy including banking, warehousing, shipping, and importing. This control of commodity distribution kept Hawaiians burdened under high prices and toiling under a diminished quality of life. These businessmen had perfected the double-edged sword of capitalism – a wage-earning labor force dependent upon plantation goods and services. Close ties as missionaries to the Hawaiian monarchy along with capital investments, cheap land, cheap labor, and increased global trade, allowed them to prosper. Alexander & Baldwin acquired additional sugar lands and also operated a sailing fleet between Hawai`i and the mainland. That shipping concern became American-Hawaiian Line, and later Matson. Later the sons and grandsons of the early missionaries played central roles in the overthrow of the Kingdom of Hawaiʻi in 1893, creating a short-lived republic. In 1898, the Republic of Hawaiʻi was annexed by the United States and became the Territory of Hawaiʻi, aided by the lobbying of the sugar interests.

== Importing labor ==
Hawaiʻi Demographics, 1959.

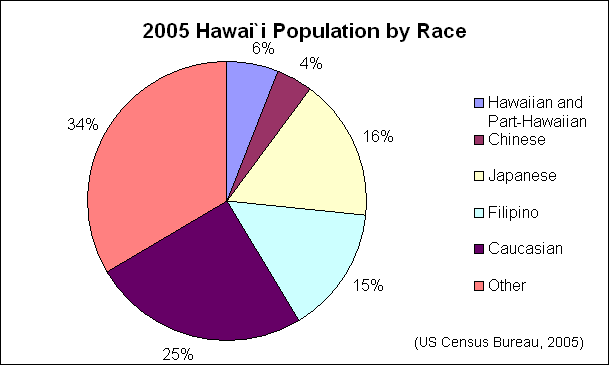
Hawaiʻi Demographics, 2005.

When Hawaiian plantations began to produce on a large scale, it became obvious that a labor force needed to be imported. The Hawaiian population was one-sixth (17%) of its pre-1778 size due to ravaging diseases brought in by foreigners. Additionally, Hawaiian people saw little use for working on the plantations when they could easily subsist by farming and fishing. Plantation owners quickly began importing workers which dramatically changed Hawaiʻi's demographics and is an extreme example of globalization.

In 1850 the first imported worker arrived from China. Between 1852 and 1887, almost 50,000 Chinese individuals arrived to work in Hawaiʻi, while 38% of them returned to China. Although help was needed to work the fields, new problems, like feeding, housing and caring for new employees, were created for many of the planters since the Chinese immigrants did not live off the land like Native Hawaiians, who required little support. To prevent their workforce from organizing effectively against them, plantation managers diversified the ethnicities of their workforce, and in 1878 the first Japanese arrived to work on the plantations. Between 1885 and 1924, 200,000 Japanese people arrived with 55% returning to Japan. Between 1903 and 1910, 7,300 Koreans arrived and only 16% returned to Korea. In 1906 Filipino people first arrived. Between 1909 and 1930, 112,800 Filipinos came to Hawaiʻi with 36% returning to the Philippines.

Plantation owners worked hard to maintain a hierarchical caste system that prevented worker organization, and divided the camps based on ethnic identity. An interesting outcome of this multi-cultural workforce and globalization of plantation workers was the emergence of a common language. Known as Hawaiian Pidgin, this hybrid primarily of Hawaiian, English, Japanese, Chinese, and Portuguese allowed plantation workers to communicate effectively with one another and promoted a transfer of knowledge and traditions among the groups. A comparison of 1959–2005 racial categories shows the ongoing shifts.

A unique operation was the Kohala Sugar Company, known as "The Missionary Plantation" since it was founded by Reverend Elias Bond in 1862 to support his church and schools. He protested the slave-like conditions, and the profits made him one of the largest benefactors to other missions. It operated for 110 years.

== Environmental impact ==
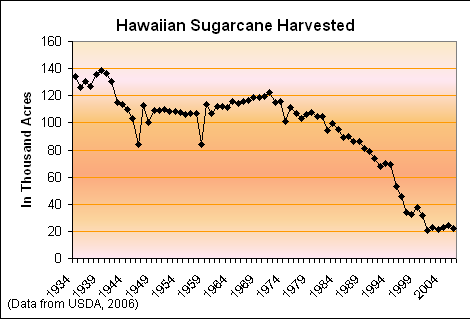
Amount of sugarcane harvested in Hawaii over time in acres

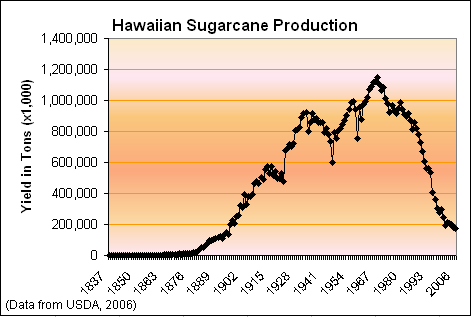
Amount of sugarcane harvested in Hawaiʻi over time in tons

Sugar plantations dramatically impacted the environment around them. In an 1821 account, prior to the entrenchment of sugarcane plantations in Aiea, the area is described as belonging to many different people and being filled with taro and banana plantations along with a fish pond. This subsistence farming would not last long.

Plantations were strategically located throughout the Hawaiian Islands for reasons including: fertile soil area, level topography, sufficient water for irrigation, and a mild climate with little annual variation. These plantations transformed the land primarily to suit water needs: construction of tunnels to divert water from the mountains to the plantations, reservoir construction, and well digging.

Water was always a serious concern for plantation managers and owners. In the early 20th century, it took one ton (1000 L) of water to produce one pound (500 g) of refined sugar. This inefficient use of water and the relative lack of fresh water in the island environment were fiercely compounding environmental degradation. Sugar processing places significant demands on resources including irrigation, coal, iron, wood, steam, and railroads for transportation.

Early mills were extremely inefficient, producing molasses in four hours using an entire cord of wood (3.6 m3 ) to do so. This level of wood use caused dramatic deforestation. At times, ecosystems were entirely destroyed unnecessarily. One plantation drained a riparian area of 600 acres (240 ha) to produce cane. After draining the land and forever altering the biodiversity levels, they discovered it was an ancient forest, so they harvested the trees for timber, only then to find that the land was completely unsuitable for sugarcane production.

== Decline of plantations ==
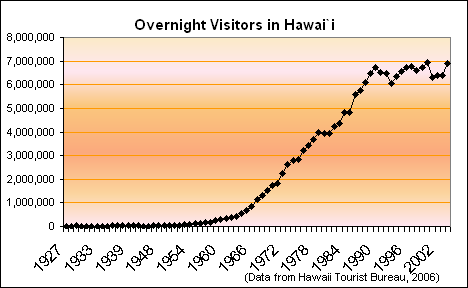
As the prevalence of sugarcane in Hawaiʻi deteriorated, tourism was promoted to take its place.

Sugar plantations suffered from many of the same afflictions that manufacturing market segments in the United States continue to feel. Labor costs increased significantly when Hawaiʻi became a state and workers were no longer effectively indentured servants. The hierarchical caste system plantation managers sought to maintain began to break down, with greater racial integration of the sugarcane plantations. Workers began to discover they had rights, and in 1920 waged the first multi-cultural strike. Global politics played a large role in the downfall of Hawaiian sugar. Shifting political alliances between 1902 and 1930 permitted Cuba to have a larger share of the United States sugar market, holding 45% of the domestic quota while Hawaiʻi, the Philippines, and Puerto Rico shared 25%.

The Big Five slowed the production of sugar as cheaper labor was found in India, South America and the Caribbean and concentrated their efforts on the imposition of a tourism-based society. Former plantation land was used by the conglomerates to build hotels and develop this tourist-based economy which has dominated the past 50 years of Hawaiian economics. Hawaiʻi's last working sugar mill, in Puunene, Maui, produced the final shipment of sugar from Hawaiʻi in December 2016. The mill was permanently closed soon thereafter and the last 375 employees of the Hawaiian Commercial & Sugar Company were laid off. Sugarcane continued to be grown in Hawaii for the purpose of producing Rhum agricole.

== Planters and managers ==
- Hawaiian Sugar Planters' Association
- John Mott-Smith (1824–1895)
- Claus Spreckels (1828–1908) – while based mostly in California
- George P. Trousseau (1833–1894)
- Rufus A. Lyman (1842–1910)
- Samuel Parker (1853–1920)
- William H. Purvis (1858–1950)
- David M. Forbes (1863–1937)

== List of Hawaii plantations, sugar mills & growers ==
Hawaiʻi's sugar industry and related businesses were controlled by five companies referred to as the Big Five. Most were founded by missionaries, or the sons of missionaries, and into the 1930s, all had direct descendants of missionaries on their boards of directors. The companies had significant economic and political power that influenced businesses and lives in Hawaiʻi in their time and beyond.

Sugar cane was first recorded as being planted in Mānoa Valley on Oʻahu in 1825. Since then, over 500 sugar plantations, sugar mills, and sugar growers have existed in the Hawaiian Islands. Many plantations were renamed when sold to or merged with another company, which can make tracing their history difficult. For example, in 1873, Nāʻālehu Sugar Plantation was renamed Hutchinson Sugar Plantation Co.; then Kaʻu Sugar Company. Honokaʻa Sugar Company became Davies Hāmākua Plantation Ltd.; then renamed Hāmākua Sugar Company. Pepeʻekeo is also known as Hilo Coast Processing Company. Honolulu Sugar Company became known as Aiea Sugar Mill.

Name	Location	Agents
AH. Smith & Co.	Kōloa, Kauaʻi	Castle & Cooke
A.S. Wilcox	Hanamāʻulu, Kauaʻi	H. Hackfeld & Co.
Apokaa Sugar Co.	Ewa, Oʻahu	Castle & Cooke
Beecroft Plantation	Kohala, Hawaiʻi Island	Theo H. Davies & Co.
C. Borchgrevink	Waimea, Kauaʻi	H. Hackfeld & Co.
East Maui Stock Co.	Makawao, Maui	C. Brewer & Co.
‘Ele‘ele Plantation	Kōloa, Kauaʻi	F.A. Schaefer & Co.
Ewa Plantation	Ewa, Oʻahu	Castle & Cooke
Faye & Meyer	Waimea, Kauaʻi	H. Hackfeld & Co.
Grove Farm	Nāwiliwili, Kauaʻi	H. Hackfeld & Co.
Grove Ranch Plantation Co.	Pāʻia, Maui	Castle & Cooke
H. J. Faye & Co.	Mana, Kauaʻi	H. Hackfeld & Co.
Haՙikū Sugar Co.	Haՙikū, Maui	Castle & Cooke; Alexander & Baldwin
Hakalau Plantation Co.	Hilo, Hawaiʻi Island	W.G. Irwin & Co.
Hālawa Sugar Co.	Kohala, Hawaiʻi Island	C. Brewer & Co.; Waterhouse & Co.
Hāmākua Mill Co.	Hāmākua, Hawaiʻi Island	Theo H. Davies & Co.
Hana Plantation	Hana, Maui	M.S. Grinbaum & Co.
Hawai'i Mill Co.	Hilo, Hawaiʻi Island	H. Hackfeld & Co.
Hawaiian Agricultural Co.	Kaʻu, Hawaiʻi Island	C. Brewer & Co.
Hawaiian Commercial & Sugar Co.	Kahului, Maui	W. G. Irwin & Co.; Alexander & Baldwin
Hawaiian Sugar Co.	Makaweli, Kauaʻi	Alexander & Baldwin
Hāwī Mill & Plantation	Kohala, Hawaiʻi Island	Theo H. Davies & Co.
Heՙeia Agricultural Co. Ltd.	Koՙolau, Oʻahu	M. S. Grinbaum & Co.
Hīlea Sugar Co.	Kaʻu, Hawaiʻi Island	W. G. Irwin & Co.
Hilo Portuguese Sugar Mill	Hilo, Hawaiʻi Island	H. Hackfeld & Co.
Hilo Sugar Co.	Hāmākua, Hawaiʻi Island	F. A. Schaefer & Co.
Honolulu Plantation Co.	Halawa, Oʻahu	W. G. Irwin & Co.
Honomū Sugar Co.	Hilo, Hawaiʻi Island	C. Brewer & Co.
Huelo Mill Co.	Huelo, Maui	W. G. Irwin & Co.
Huelo Plantation	Hāmākua, Maui	W. G. Irwin & Co.
Hutchinson Sugar Plantation & Co.	Ka'u, Hawaiʻi Island	W. G. Irwin & Co.
J. M. Horner & Sons	Hāmākua, Hawaiʻi Island	F. A. Schaefer & Co.
J. Marsden	Hāmākua, Hawaiʻi Island	F. A. Schaefer & Co.
J. N. Wright	ʻŌʻōkala, Hawaiʻi Island	H. Hackfeld & Co.
Kahuku Plantation	Kahuku, Oʻahu	Alexander & Baldwin
Kailua Sugar Co.	Kona, Hawaiʻi Island	C. J. Hutchins
Kaiwilahilahi Mill	Laupāhoehoe, Hawaiʻi Island	Theo H. Davies & Co.
Kaluahonu Co.	Kōloa, Kauaʻi	H. Hackfeld & Co.
Kamalō Sugar Plantation	Molokaʻi, Molokaʻi	John McColgan
Kāneʻohe Plantation	Kāneʻohe, Oʻahu	C. Brewer & Co.
Kekaha Mill Co.	Kekaha, Kauaʻi	C. Brewer & Co.
Kīhei Plantation	Kohala, Hawaiʻi Island	Alexander & Baldwin
Kīlauea Sugar Co.	Kīlauea, Kauaʻi	W. G. Irwin & Co.
Kīpahulu Sugar Co.	Kīpahulu, Maui	H. Hackfeld & Co.
Kohala Plantation	Kohala, Hawaiʻi Island	Castle & Cooke
Kōloa Sugar Co.	Kōloa, Kauaʻi	H. Hackfeld & Co.
Kona Sugar Company	Kona, Hawaiʻi Island	McChesney & Sons
Kūkaʻiau Mill Co.	Hāmākua, Hawaiʻi Island	F. A. Schaefer & Co.
Kūkaʻiau Plantation Co.	Hāmākua, Hawaiʻi Island	H. Hackfeld & Co.
Kynnersley Bros.	Kohala, Hawaiʻi Island	T. H. Davies & Co.
Lāՙie Plantation	Lāՙie, Oʻahu	J. T. Waterhouse & Co.
Laupāhoehoe Sugar Co.	Laupāhoehoe, Hawaiʻi Island	Theo H, Davies & Co.
Līhuʻe Plantation	Līhuʻe, Kauaʻi	H. Hackfeld & Co.
Mākaha Plantation	Waiʻanae, Oʻahu	W. G. Irwin & Co.
Makee Sugar Co.	Keālia, Kauaʻi	W. G. Irwin & Co.
Maui Agricultural Co.	Haՙikū, Maui	Alexander & Baldwin
Maui Sugar Co.	Huelo, Maui	F. A. Schaefer & Co.
McBryde Sugar Co.	Wahiawa, Kauaʻi	Theo H. Davies & Co.
Moanui Sugar Mill & Plantation	Moanui, Molokaʻi	Wong Leong & Co.
Niuliʻi Mill & Plantation	Kohala, Hawaiʻi Island	Theo H. Davies & Co.
Oʻahu Sugar Co.	Waipahu, Oʻahu	H. Hackfeld & Co.
ʻŌlaʻa Sugar Company	ʻŌlaʻa, Hawaiʻi Island	Alexander & Baldwin; B. F. Dillingham & Co.
Olowalu Sugar Co.	Olowalu, Maui	W. G. Irwin & Co.
Onomea Sugar Co.	Hilo, Hawaiʻi Island	C. Brewer & Co.
ʻOʻōkala Sugar Co.	ʻOʻōkala, Hawaiʻi Island	W. G. Irwin & Co.; C. Brewer & Co.
Pāʻauhau Sugar Plantation Co.	Hāmākua, Hawaiʻi Island	W. G. Irwin & Co.
Pacific Sugar Mill	Hāmākua, Hawaiʻi Island	F. A. Schaefer & Co.
Pāʻia Plantation	Pāʻia, Maui	Castle & Cooke
Pāpaʻikou Sugar Co.	Hilo, Hawaiʻi Island	Alexander & Baldwin; Castle & Cooke
Paty & Parker	Hāmākua, Hawaiʻi Island	F. A. Schaefer & Co.
Paukaʻa Sugar Co.	Hilo, Hawaiʻi Island	C. Brewer & Co.
Pepeʻekeo Sugar Co.	Hilo, Hawaiʻi Island	Theo H. Davies & Co.; C. Brewer & Co.
Pioneer Mill	Lahaina, Mahui	H. Hackfeld & Co.
Princeville Plantation Co.	Hanalei, Kauaʻi	C. Brewer & Co.
Puakea Plantation Co.	Kohala, Hawaiʻi Island	Theo H. Davies & Co.
Puakō Plantation	South Kohala, Hawaiʻi Island	Hind, Rolph & Co.
Puna Sugar Co.	Puna, Hawaiʻi Island	B. F. Dillingham & Co.
R. M. Overend	Honokaՙaՙa, Hawaiʻi Island	H. Hackfeld & Co.
R. W. Meyer	Kalaʻe, Molokaʻi	H. Hackfeld & Co.
Riciprocity Sugar Co.	Hana, Maui	W. G. Irwin & Co.
Star Mill Co.	Kohala, Hawaiʻi Island	W. G. Irwin & Co.
Thompson & Bro.	Kohala, Hawaiʻi Island	M. S. Grinbaum & Co.
Union Mill Co.	Kohala, Hawaiʻi Island	Theo H. Davies & Co.
W. H. Purvis & Co.	Hāmākua, Hawaiʻi Island	F. A. Schaefer & Co.
W. H. Rickard	Hāmākua, Hawaiʻi Island	F. A. Schaefer & Co.
W. Y. Horner	Lahaina, Maui	H. Hackfeld & Co.
Waiākea Mill & Plantation Co.	Hilo, Hawaiʻi Island	Theo H. Davies & Co.
Waialua Agricultural Co.	Waialua, Oʻahu	Castle & Cooke
Wai‘anae Sugar Co.	Wai‘anae, Oʻahu	H. A. Widemann; J. M. Dowsett
Waiheʻe Sugar Co.	Waiheʻe, Maui	W. G. Irwin & Co.
Waikapū Sugar Co.	Waikapū, Maui	W. G. Irwin & Co.
Wailuku Sugar Co.	Wailuku, Maui	C. Brewer & Co.
Waimānalo Sugar Co.	Waimānalo, Oʻahu	C. Bolte; W. G. Irwin & Co.
Waimea Sugar Mill	Waimea, Kauaʻi	H. Hackfeld & Co.; Castle & Cooke
Waipunale Plantation	Hilo, Hawaiʻi Island	Theo H. Davies & Co.

== See also ==
- Hawaiian sugar strike of 1946
