= John W. A. "Doc" Buyers =

American businessman (1928–2006)

- Born: John William Amerman Buyers; July 17, 1928; Coatesville, Pennsylvania, U.S.
- Died: May 20, 2006 (aged 77); Wyndmoor, Pennsylvania, U.S.
- Other name: Doc Buyers
- Education: The Stony Brook School; Princeton University
- Occupation: Businessman
- Spouse: Elizabeth Lindsey (m. 1999)

John William Amerman "Doc" Buyers (July 17, 1928 – May 20, 2006) was an American businessman. He was best known as the chair and chief executive officer of the Hawaii company C. Brewer & Co. Buyers was a 1952 graduate of Princeton University.

== Background ==
Buyers was born in Coatesville, Pennsylvania, the youngest of five children. In 1946, he graduated from The Stony Brook School on Long Island. As a Princeton Tiger football player, he received from his teammates the nickname "Doc," after West Point's Felix Anthony "Doc" Blanchard.

== Career ==
Buyers came to Hawaii in 1975 as an executive with IU International Corporation. He was sent to head C. Brewer, a Hawaii-based company in which IU had acquired a majority stake. In 1986, Buyers organized a leveraged buyout of C. Brewer and became chairman and CEO of the newly independent company. Buyers would continue as head of the company until its dissolution in 2001. In 1996, Buyers announced plans to relocate the company's headquarters to Hilo in 1998.
