= Elizabeth Kapuʻuwailani Lindsey =

Actress, anthropologist, and explorer

Elizabeth Lindsey
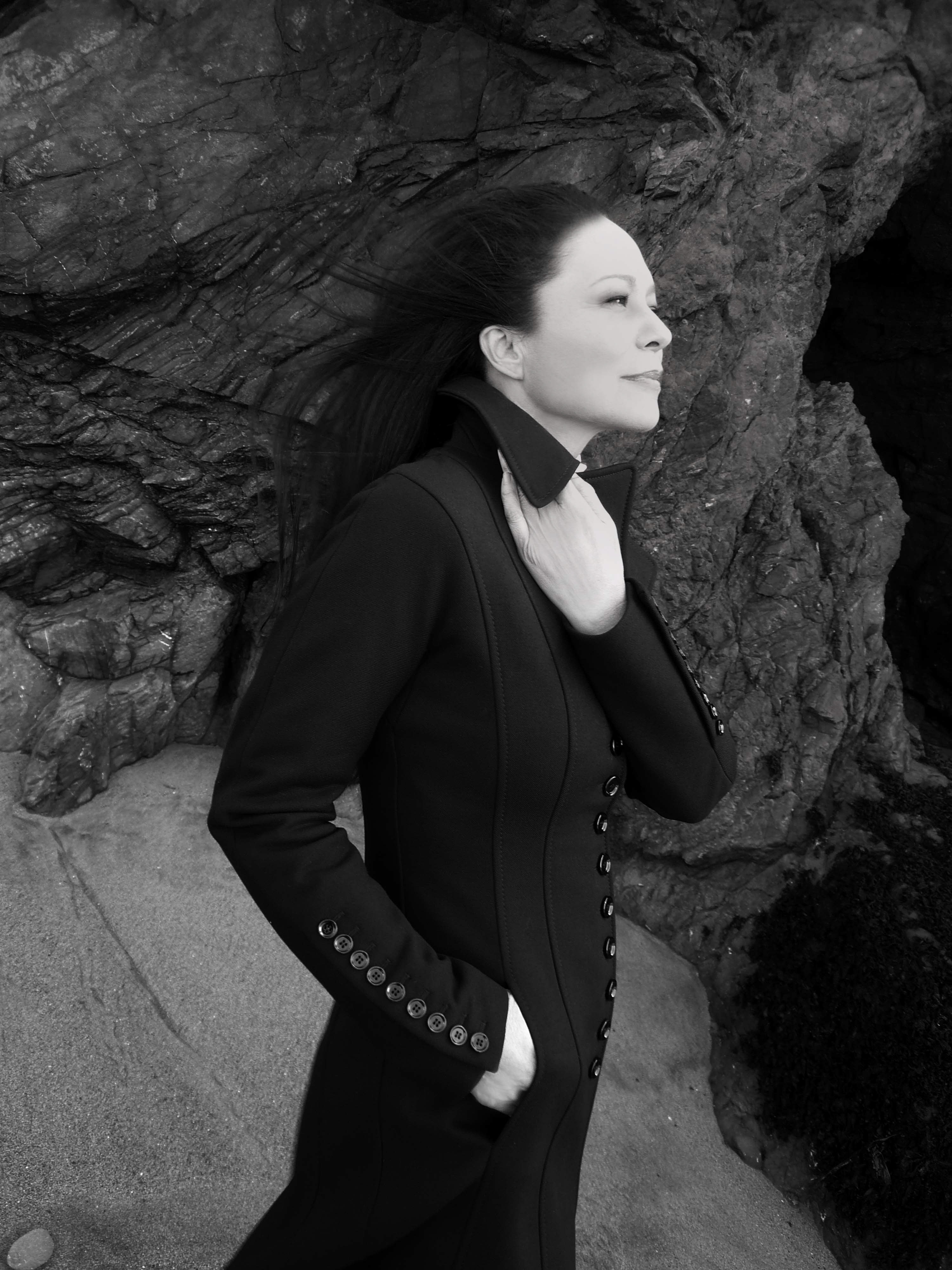
- Born: Elizabeth Kapuʻuwailani Lindsey; April 17, 1956 (age 70); Oahu, Hawaii, U.S.
- Occupations: Explorer; Anthropologist; Actress
- Years active: 1981–present
- Spouses: John W. A. "Doc" Buyers (m. 1999; died 2006) George David Crowley, III (m. 2018)

Elizabeth Kapuʻuwailani Lindsey is a cultural anthropologist and the first Polynesian Explorer and female Fellow in the history of the National Geographic Society. She holds a Ph.D. in cultural anthropology, specializing in ethnonavigation, and studied for nearly a decade with Mau Piailug, the master navigator of Satawal, Micronesia, as part of her doctoral fieldwork.

== Early life and education ==
Lindsey was born and raised in Hawaiʻi. She is a descendant of navigators and seafarers on both sides of her family. In 1978, she was crowned Miss Hawaiʻi. She went on to earn a doctorate in cultural anthropology, with her research focusing on indigenous knowledge systems and Pacific navigation traditions.

== Career ==
=== Acting ===
Beginning in 1979 Lindsey portrayed a number of characters in film and television, perhaps most prominently in the recurring role of the nurse Mai on China Beach. Her guest appearances include three episodes of Fantasy Island, as Lily in the season five Charlie's Angels episode "Hula Angels", Simon & Simon, Knight Rider, Star Trek: The Next Generation as Louisa Kim in the episode "Home Soil", The Byrds of Paradise, and Magnum, P.I., among others. Her 1998 theatrical film appearances include Bulworth and Next Stop Wonderland, and the role of Louise Deng in The Corruptor in 1999.

=== Wayfinding and ethnonavigation ===
Beginning in 1997, Lindsey studied ethnonavigation with Pius "Mau" Piailug as part of her Ph.D. work in anthropology. Piailug, the master navigator of Satawal in Micronesia, was widely recognized for preserving and transmitting traditional non-instrument navigation techniques that had been practiced for centuries across Oceania. He was also the teacher of Nainoa Thompson, a central figure in the navigational revival led by the Polynesian Voyaging Society in Hawaiʻi. In 2007, Lindsey led a small crew to Satawal, where they spent a month documenting the arrival of voyaging canoes, the pwo navigator initiation ceremony, and navigational traditions that had been passed down through generations of master navigators. The expedition represented the convergence of her anthropological scholarship and years of fieldwork under Piailug's guidance.

=== National Geographic ===
Lindsey's work with the National Geographic Society has centered on the documentation and preservation of endangered indigenous knowledge systems, with a particular focus on Polynesian and Micronesian navigation. Her research has contributed to a broader scientific understanding of non-instrument navigation as a body of empirical knowledge rather than folklore.

=== TED ===
Lindsey delivered the TED talk Curating Humanity's Heritage, in which she addressed the loss of indigenous knowledge systems and the urgency of preserving oral traditions before they disappear. She has also spoken at TEDx Maui in January 2012 and TEDxWomen later that year.

=== Google ===
Lindsey collaborated with Google on a geospatial initiative known as the "Map of the Human Story," a project that used mapping technology to chart and preserve indigenous knowledge systems and cultural heritage sites around the world.

=== Filmmaking ===
Lindsey directed and produced the documentary Then There Were None, which chronicles the near-extinction of the Native Hawaiian population following Western contact. The film received a CINE Golden Eagle Award.

== Awards and recognition ==
CINE Golden Eagle Award (1996), for

Then There Were None

"Woman of the Year" for The Big Island of Hawaiʻi (2004)

National Geographic Fellow (2008)

United Nations Visionary Award (2010)

== Personal life ==
Lindsey was married to John W. A. "Doc" Buyers, former chairman and chief executive officer of C. Brewer & Co., from 1999 until his death in 2006. She married George D. Crowley III in 2018. Crowley is the Chairman and Chief Executive Officer of Crowley Technologies. He is a pioneer in wireless telecommunications.

== Filmography ==
Elizabeth Lindsey film and television credits
Year	Title	Role	Notes	Ref.
1979, 1983	Fantasy Island	Debbie / Nurse #3	3 episodes	
1981	Charlie's Angels	Lily	Episode: "Hula Angels"	
1981	Magnum, P.I.	Kiki	1 episode	
1984	Knight Rider	Rachel Robinson	1 episode	
1984	Simon & Simon	Suzanne Yoshiro	1 episode	
1988	Star Trek: The Next Generation	Louisa Kim	Episode: "Home Soil"	
1988–1989	China Beach	Mai / Viet Cong Nurse	10 episodes	
1994	The Byrds of Paradise	Healani Douglas	12 episodes	
1998	Bulworth	American Politics Host	Theatrical film	
1998	Next Stop Wonderland	Lucy Bidwell	Theatrical film	
1999	Fantasy Island	Detective Rossi	1 episode	
1999	The Corruptor	Louise Deng	Theatrical film	
