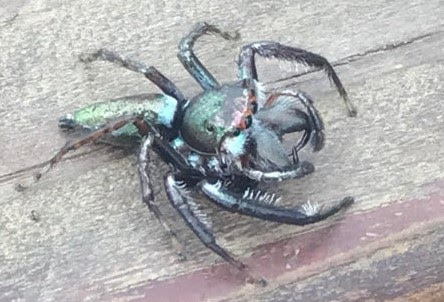
- Ascyltus pterygodes, the type species, on Maui

Scientific classification
- Kingdom: Animalia
- Phylum: Arthropoda
- Subphylum: Chelicerata
- Class: Arachnida
- Order: Araneae
- Infraorder: Araneomorphae
- Family: Salticidae
- Subfamily: Salticinae
- Genus: Ascyltus; Karsch, 1878

Type species
- A. pterygodes (L. Koch, 1865)

Species
- 10, see text

= Ascyltus =

Genus of spiders

Ascyltus are a genus of jumping spiders in the family Salticidae that was first described by Ferdinand Anton Franz Karsch in 1878. As of December 2020, the genus contained 10 species. Ascyltus spiders utilize their vision in courtship, hunting, and navigation. They are typically large to medium-sized salticids and often move relatively slowly. However, they are capable of agile jumps when moving, hunting, or to avoid predators. They have well-developed book lungs and tracheal systems, and they are capable of utilizing both systems. Ascyltus have four pairs of eyes, with the anterior median pair being the most prominent. One distinguishable characteristic of the genus is their antero-lateral carapace, which is iridescently coloured.

== Distinguishing characteristics ==
Ascyltus are relatively large to medium-sized salticids, distinguishable from other Pacific salticids by their antero-lateral carapace, which is iridescently coloured. In addition to being iridescently coloured, their antero-lateral carapace is typically widened even at a juvenile age. Like other members of the Salticidae, Ascyltus have four pairs of eyes in three rows. The anterior median eyes are noticeably more prominent than the others. Male palpal structures are similar among all Ascyltus species.

=== Size ===
Males average 13–19 mm, females average 16–20 mm.

== Geographic distribution ==
The majority of Ascyltus species live in Oceania, having a widespread distribution across the Pacific islands, including the Hawaiian islands.

== Diet ==
Ascyltus are carnivorous, so their diet mainly consists of insects around the tropical region. They capture the majority of their food by stalking or hunting prey. This includes many flies, crickets, and small grasshoppers.

== Hunting ==
Ascyltus relies on visual stimuli when catching prey. The anterior-lateral eyes function to track moving objects. The anterior-median eyes are essential for the stalking of prey because of their telescopic abilities. Ascyltus spiders typically employ one of three sets of responses to catch prey. The responses are a set of motor movements as follows: alignment pursuit - follow, run, stalk; orientation - alert, swivel; and capture - crouch and jump. The distance separating the spider from its prey are the determining factor in the response pattern used.

== Species ==
As of December 2020, the genus contains ten species, found only in Oceania, on the Pacific Islands, and Sulawesi:

- Ascyltus asper (Karsch, 1878) – Australia (New South Wales), New Caledonia
- Ascyltus audax (Rainbow, 1897) – Tuvalu (Funafuti)
- Ascyltus divinus Karsch, 1878 – Australia (Queensland), Fiji
- Ascyltus ferox (Rainbow, 1897) – Tuvalu (Funafuti)
- Ascyltus lautus (Keyserling, 1881) – New Guinea, Samoa
- Ascyltus minahassae Merian, 1911 – Indonesia (Sulawesi)
- Ascyltus opulentus (Walckenaer, 1837) – Tonga
- Ascyltus pterygodes (L. Koch, 1865) (type) – Pacific Is.
- Ascyltus rhizophora Berry, Beatty & Prószyński, 1997 – Fiji
- Ascyltus similis Berry, Beatty & Prószyński, 1997 – Fiji, Samoa
