= IU International Corporation =

Philadelphia-based conglomerate

- Company type: Public
- Industry: Conglomerate
- Founded: 1924
- Defunct: 1988
- Successor: Neoax Inc. (waste management division); Landstar System, Inc. (trucking unit); AMFAX, Inc. (food distribution unit)
- Headquarters: Philadelphia, Pennsylvania, United States
- Subsidiaries: Biggers Brothers; Byrns Motor Express; Calkraft Paper Co. Canadian Utilities Limited; C. Brewer & Co. C & H Transportation Co. Coast-to-Coast Express; Codesco Inc. Conversion Systems Inc. Customized Transportation; Delta Southern Company; Echo Bay Mines; Envirosafe Services Inc. Expressway Nationwide; Farmbest; Frick Company; Gemini Trucking; General Waterworks Corporation; Gotaas-Larsen Shipping Corp. G. & W. H. Corson; Helms Express; Hills Mccanna Co. Independent Freightway; International Mill Service; Ligon Nationwide; Mauna Kea Sugar Company; Mauna Loa Macadamia Nut Corporation; Nationwide Intermodal; Pacific Intermountain Express; Pagette Air Signals; Pepeekeo Sugar Company; Pittsburgh Gage & Supply Co. Poole Truck Line; Ranger Nationwide; Ryder Truck Lines; Saunders & Co. Somafer S.A. Southwest Fabricating & Welding Co. Tennessee Alloys Corp. Tennessee Metallurgical Corp. Thurston Motor Lines; TransMark Express; Unijax; Walworth Co.

IU International Corporation was a diversified conglomerate based in Philadelphia. It was acquired by Neoax Inc. in 1988 through a hostile takeover.

== History ==
International Utilities Corporation was incorporated in Maryland in 1924. The company changed its name to IU International Corporation in 1973.

=== Acquisitions ===
International Utilities acquired Ryder Truck Lines from Ryder System in 1965, and Pacific Intermountain Express in 1973. IU would later merge both companies in 1983, creating Ryder/P-I-E Nationwide, Inc. IU sold Ryder/P-I-E to Maxitron Corporation in late 1985.

In 1978, C. Brewer & Co. became a wholly owned subsidiary of IU. The company was sold in a leveraged buyout to its management in 1986. John W. A. "Doc" Buyers, a former IU executive, became chairman and CEO of the newly independent company.

== Popular Culture ==
IU is mentioned in John Seabrook's 2025 family historiography The Spinach King as one of the subjects, John M. Seabrook, was at one time CEO and Chairman of IU International.

== See also ==
- Big Five (Hawaii)
