= C. Brewer Building =

- U.S. National Register of Historic Places
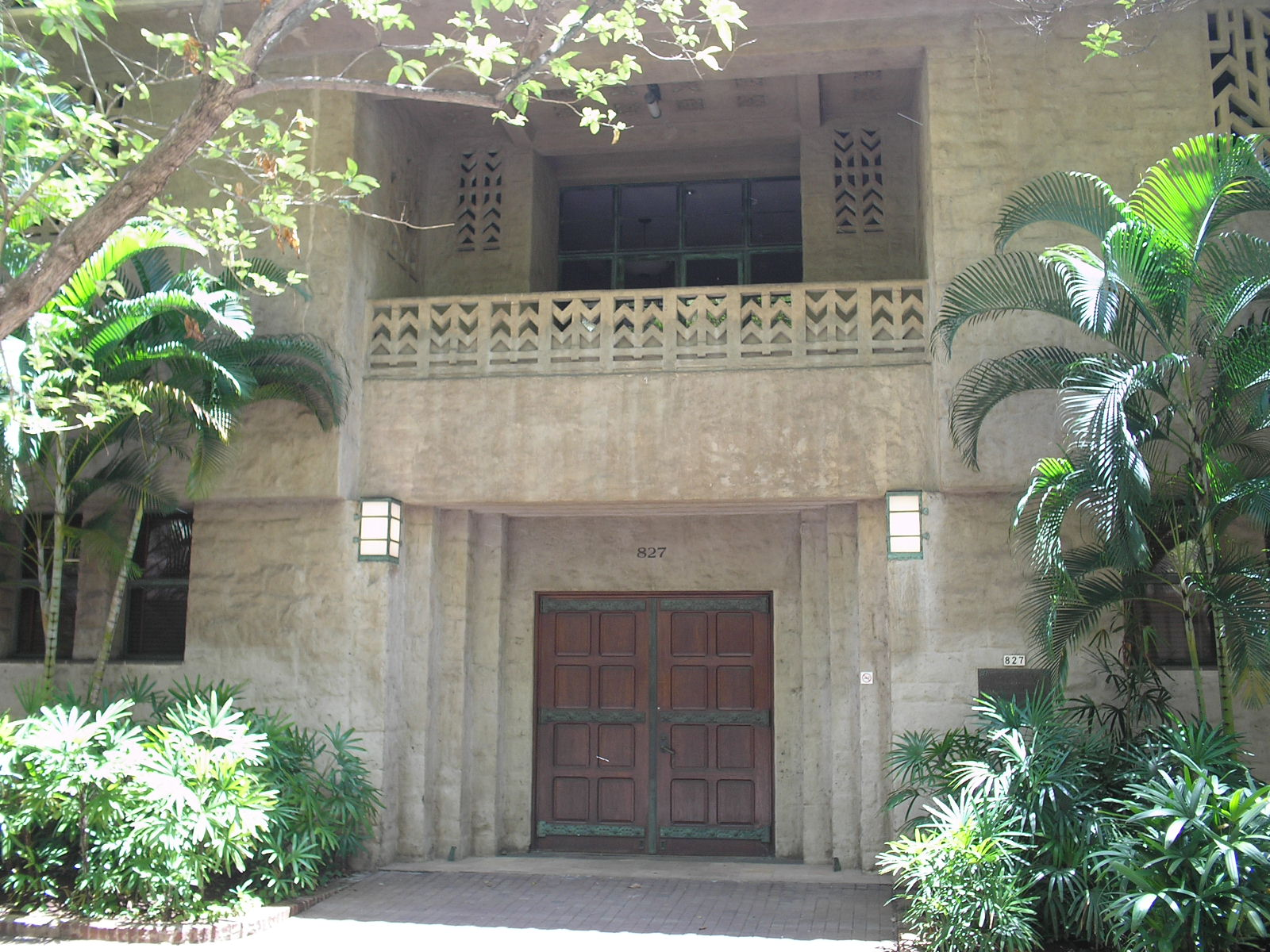

- Location within Hawaii
- Nearest city: 827 Fort St., Honolulu, Hawaii
- Coordinates: 21°18′47″N 157°51′57″W
- Area: 0.5 acres (0.20 ha)
- Built: 1930
- Architect: Hardie Phillip, Bertram Goodhue
- Architectural style: Mediterranean Revival
- NRHP reference No.: 80001272
- Added to NRHP: April 2, 1980

The C. Brewer Building at 827 Fort Street in Honolulu, Hawaiʻi was built in 1930 to be the headquarters of C. Brewer & Co., the smallest of Hawaiʻi's Big Five corporations. The intimate, almost residential design was begun by Bertram Goodhue and completed by Hardie Phillip. The building was added to the National Register of Historic Places on 2 April 1980.

Built of reinforced concrete in a Mediterranean Revival style, with cut sandstone and stucco and plaster finish, a walled garden, and second-floor balconies, it also features a tiled, double-pitched "Dickey roof" with wide eaves to protect against sun and rain. The modest decorations symbolized the business of the C. Brewer Company: wrought iron railings represent sugar cane, and light fixtures were designed to resemble of sugar cubes.

After closing down the sugar business and diversifying into other agricultural products and spinning off its real-estate business, the company moved to Hilo, Hawaii on the Big Island of Hawaii in 1998. The building now houses the statewide headquarters of the Hawaii Community Foundation which moved into the building in 2010.

== Gallery ==
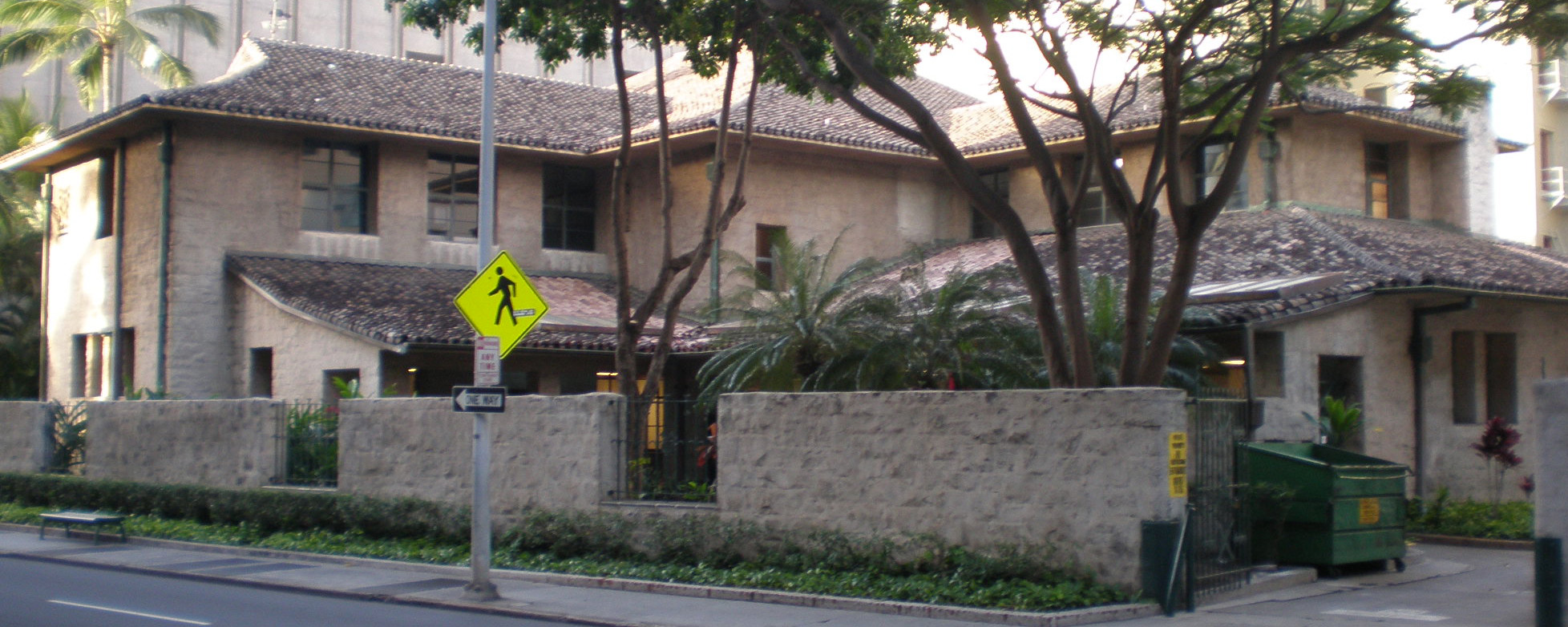
Back courtyard from Queen Street

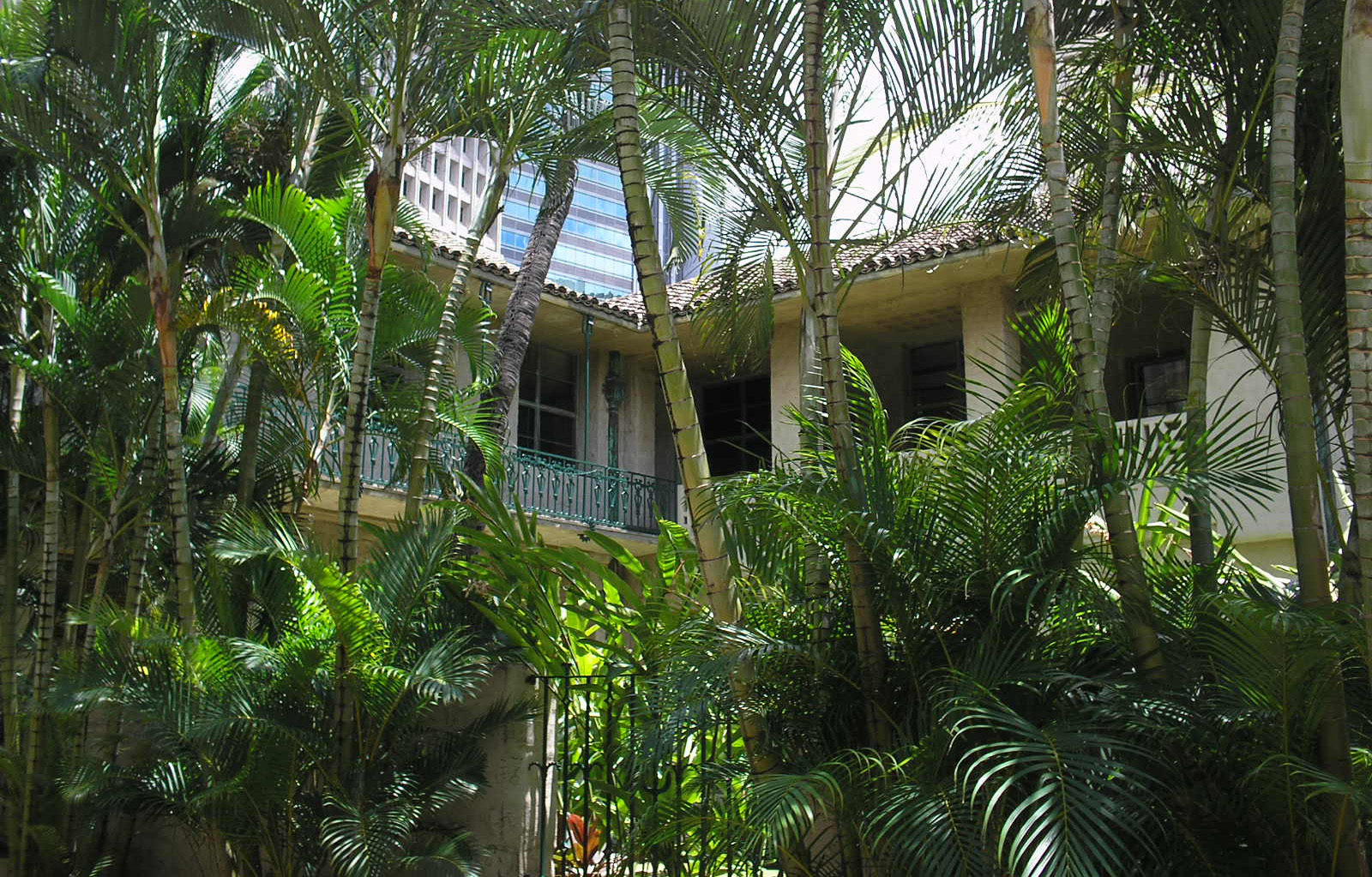
Front courtyard balconies

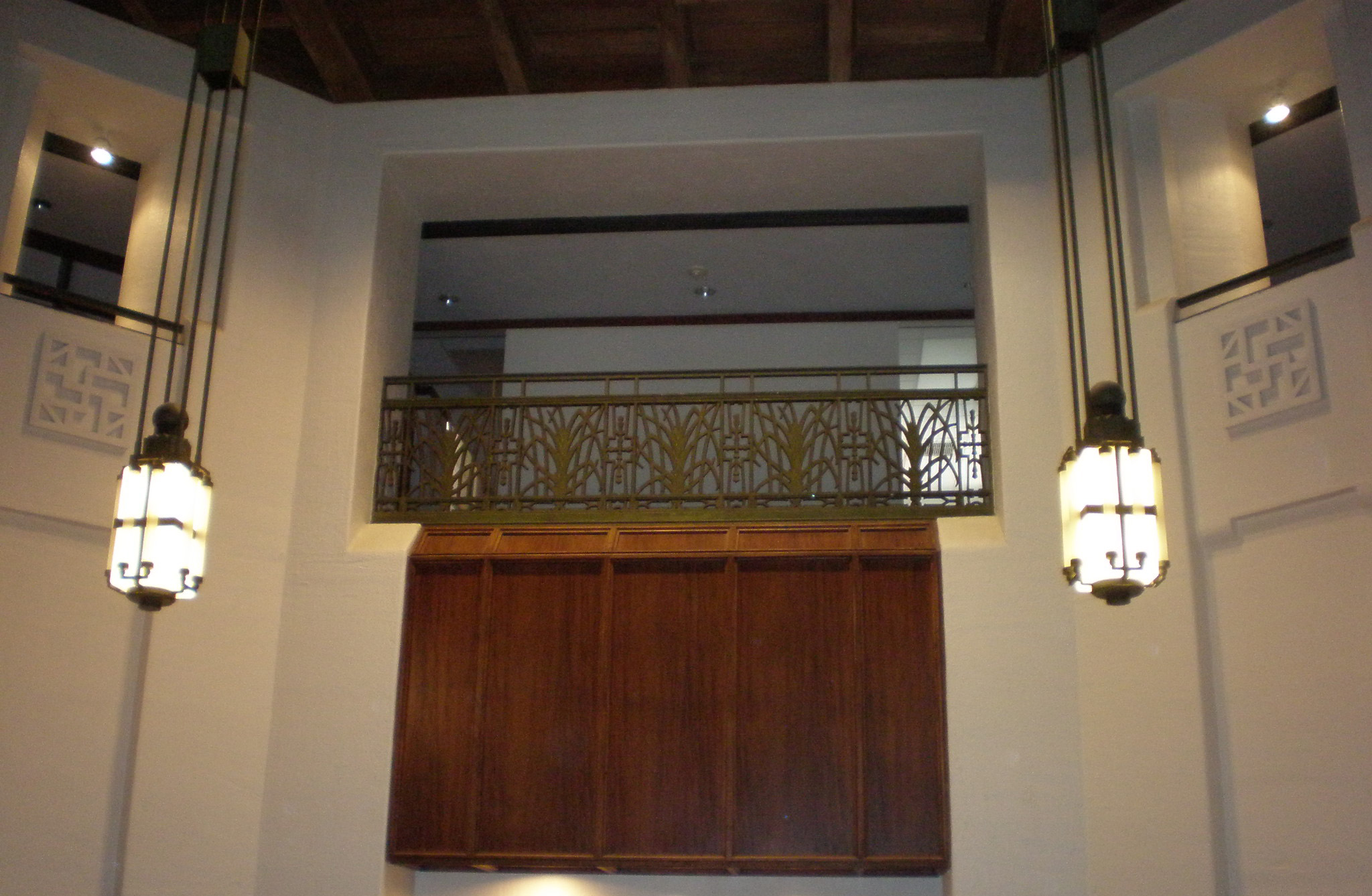
Second floor around main lobby

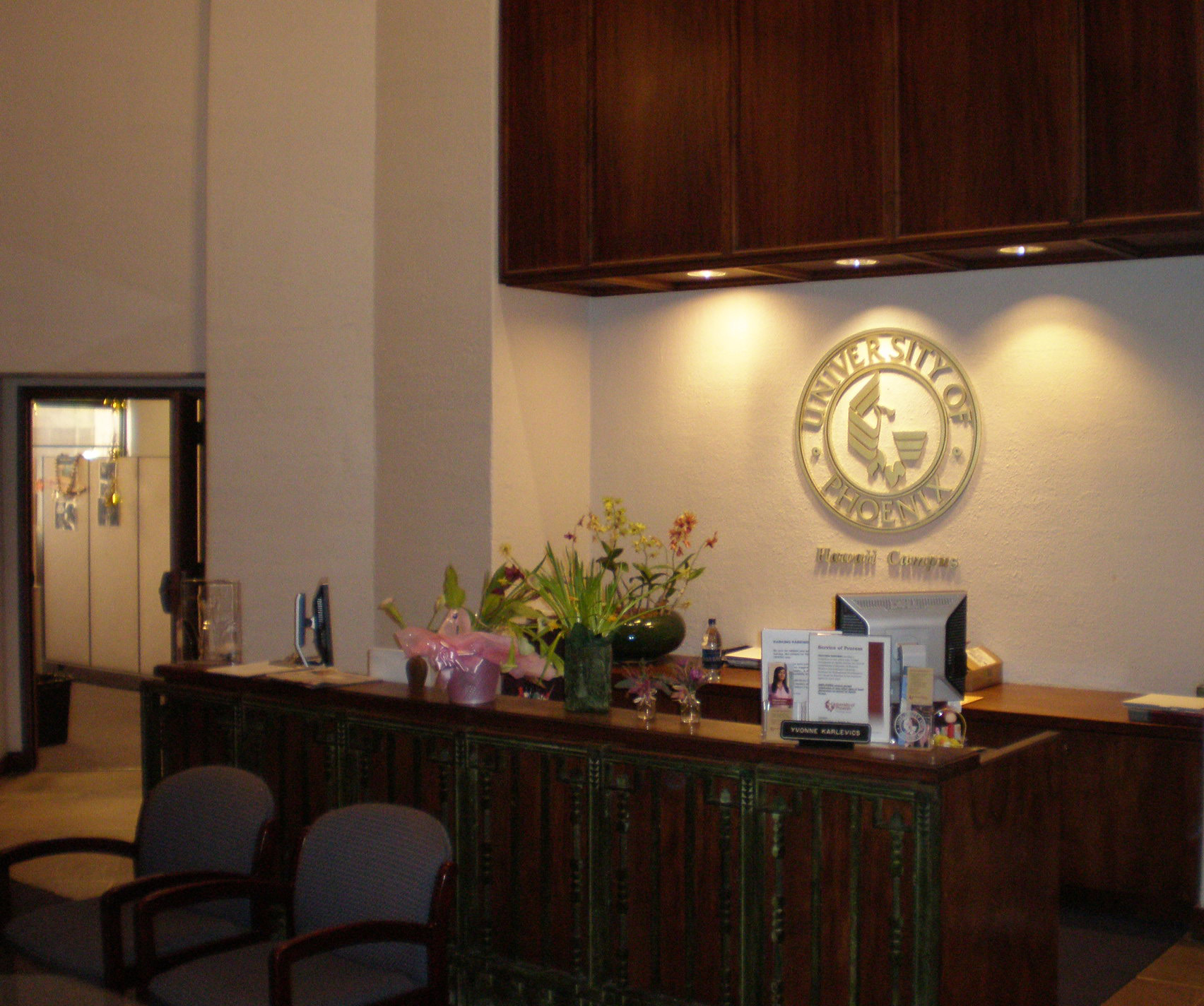
Reception desk, with Univ. of Phoenix logo

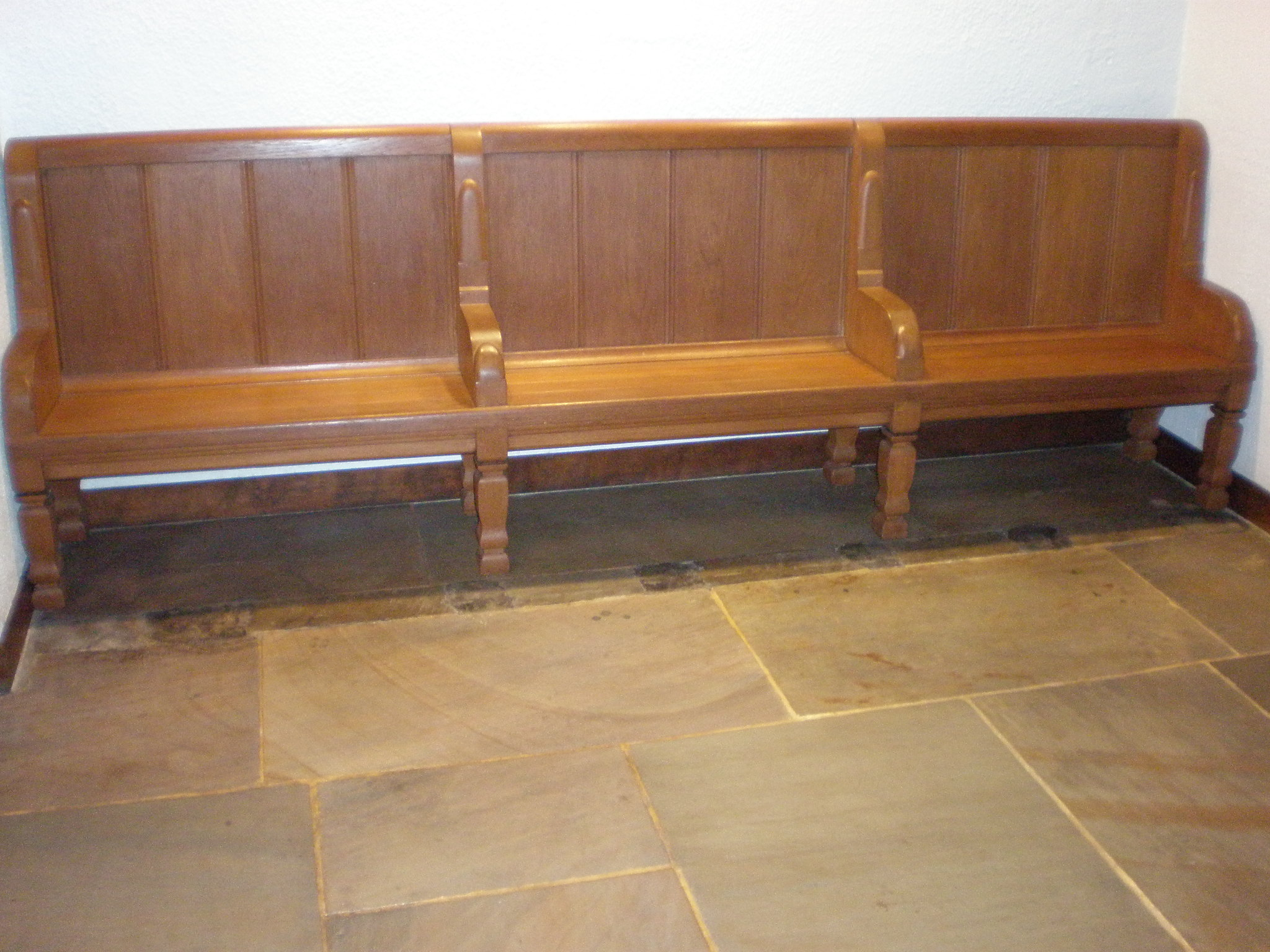
Wooden bench, stone flooring
