= Big Five (Hawaii) =

Former group of sugarcane processing corporations in Hawaii

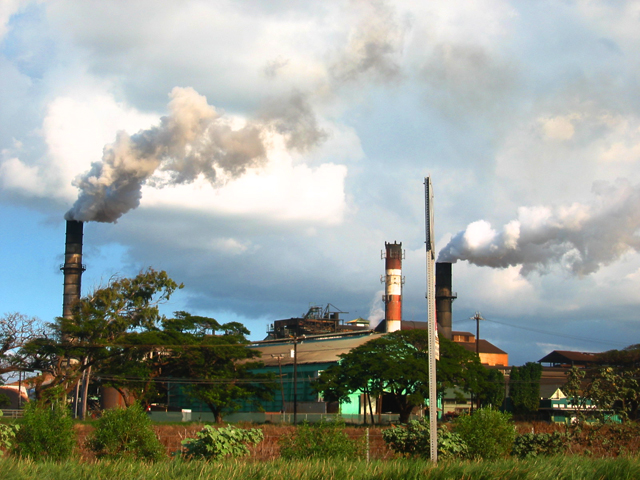
Puʻunene sugar mill, built in 1901

The Big Five (Hawaiian: Nā Hui Nui ʻElima) was the name given to a group of what started as sugarcane processing corporations that wielded considerable political power in the Territory of Hawaii during the early 20th century, and leaned heavily toward the Hawaii Republican Party. The Big Five were Castle & Cooke, Alexander & Baldwin, C. Brewer & Co., Theo H. Davies & Co., and H. Hackfeld & Co.). The term "Big Five" is often used in both association to the largest five corporations and the five missionary families from which these companies hailed. These missionary families were the first generation of missionaries to settle in Hawaii. While not all of the Big Five corporations were started by missionary families, by 1920, the second generation of missionary descendants controlled all five companies. The extent of the power that the Big Five had was considered by some as equivalent to an oligarchy. Attorney General of Hawaii Edmund Pearson Dole, referring to the Big Five, said in 1903: "There is a government in this Territory which is centralized to an extent unknown in the United States, and probably almost as centralized as it was in France under Louis XIV."

== History ==
=== 19th Century ===
Though commercial sugar production began in the first years of the 1800s, the industry remained relatively minor until the Reciprocity Treaty of 1875. This treaty provided duty-free trade of sugar between the Kingdom of Hawaii and the United States, and it generated massive disruptions in the sugar industry. Plantation growth and consolidation soon followed, with the number of plantations falling from 79 in 1875 to just 20 in 1883. Prior to this disruption, the agencies played a much more limited role in Hawaiian industry. They served primarily to add liquidity to an agricultural industry with long growing periods (18–24 months) by both providing credit against future sales and providing transportation to foreign markets and equipment procurement. With the growth pressure imposed by the Reciprocity Treaty, however, plantations required capital infusions in order to expand their cultivation into more marginal lands, leading to increased reliance on the agencies for credit. In 1889, C. Brewer & Co., H. Hackfeld & Co., Castle & Cooke, and Theo. H. Davies & Co., which were the original four predecessors of the Big Five, controlled 56% of sugar crops in Hawaii. The political stance of the five firms varied from pro-monarchy to revolutionary. However, some of the children of Big Five partners were involved in the Committee of Safety, which organized the overthrow of the Hawaiian Kingdom and lobbied for annexation. With Hawaii's annexation by the United States, this change was locked in as sugarcane plantations gained a new infusion of investment. By eliminating tariffs imposed on sugarcane producers by the United States, planters had more money to spend on equipment, land and labor. Increased capital resulted in increased production. Five kingdom-era corporations benefited from annexation, becoming multimillion-dollar conglomerations that controlled 90% of the sugar business.

=== 20th Century ===
The Big Five were involved in other businesses outside of plantations through direct ownership or by acting as directors, most notably shipping companies, utilities, railroads, and banks. Each of these corporations maintained networks of stockholdings, landholdings, and cooperative arrangements among the managers and owners of plantations and other industries. These corporations held significant power over the islands through their control and investments in land, water, and forest resources. The scope of power they held led to many residents considering them a capitalist oligarchy. By the 1910s, the third generation of missionary sons and sons-in-law in succession to the Big Five obtained the command of the corporations. However, by the 1920s, due to World War I, a majority of the sugar assets were controlled by Castle & Cooke, C. Brewer & Co., and Alexander & Baldwin. The companies colluded to keep the prices on their goods and services high. Their profits skyrocketed even more. Soon, the executives of the Big Five sat on each other's boards of directors. With economic power came political power, and the families usually favored the Republican Party of Hawaii. Political power over the islands was exerted by controlling most sugar and pineapple plantations, utilities, transportation and construction companies, insurance firms, and banks. Furthermore, appointed territorial governors and ministers similarly had connections to the Big Five as officers within the firms or investors.

Residents of Hawaii understood the vast influence of the Big Five. It was during the labor-organizing period that the term “Big Five” likely grew in usage amongst people critiquing the social workings of Hawaii. These companies eventually became the objects of protest. In September 1949, a Labor Day parade in Maui included a sign that read “CONGRESS—INVESTIGATE THE BIG FIVE." During the Democratic Revolution of 1954, the unions inflicted a decisive blow against the giants, and when the sugar industry declined after Hawaii became a state in 1959, so did each of the Big Five companies. The greatest post-statehood challenge came as the US Department of Justice challenged the ownership of Matson Navigation Company by four of the five companies (all except Theo H. Davies). The lawsuit was settled when the four companies agreed not to share officers, executives, and directors. Alexander and Baldwin eventually bought out the other three stakes in Matson in 1964.

In the 1970s, as sugar plantations closed, many of the Big Five companies themselves were bought out. Where the companies are now:

- Theo H. Davies & Co. was bought in 1973 by Scottish-controlled Hong Kong firm Jardine Matheson. Until December 2004 it owned the Pizza Hut and Taco Bell franchises in Hawaii. The sole remaining unit is its travel agency which was spun off and sold to management.
- C. Brewer was bought in 1978 by Philadelphia-based IU International Corporation, and was later bought out by its management in 1986. The company owned Mauna Loa Macadamia Nut Corporation from 1974 to 2000. In 2001, the company's shareholders voted to liquidate the company over several years.
- Castle & Cooke merged with Flexi-Van Corporation, owned by David H. Murdock, in 1985. Murdock became its chairman after the merger, then took full control in 2000. It still owns large portions of Central Oʻahu and the Iwilei area of Honolulu around the former Dole Food Company pineapple cannery. Castle & Cooke owned nearly all of the island of Lānaʻi until June 2012 when Oracle CEO Larry Ellison bought their share for approximately 500 million dollars.
- H. Hackfeld & Co. was bought out in 1988 by Chicago-based JMB Realty. In 2002, now known as Amfac, the company declared Chapter 11 bankruptcy and emerged as Kaanapali Land, LLC. It owns 5,000 acres (20 km²) in West Maui. Its department store, Liberty House, was sold to Federated Department Stores and is now part of the Macy's chain.
- Alexander & Baldwin diversified and remains in business. Today it owns about 91,000 acres (370 km²) of land and is the fifth-largest landowner in the state.
