= Laupāhoehoe, Hawaii =

Census-designated place in Hawaii, U.S.

- Census-designated place
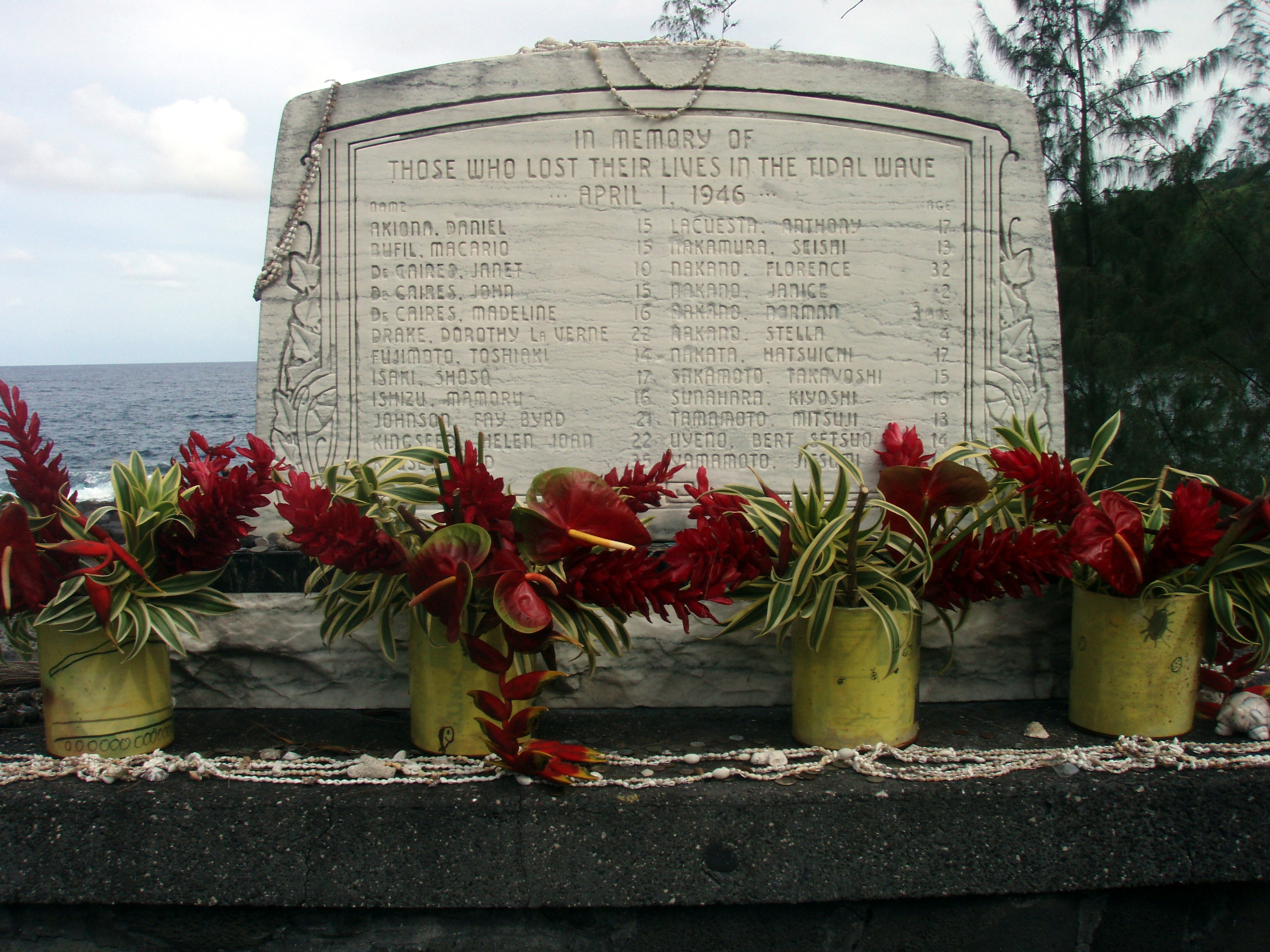
- Tsunami memorial at Laupāhoehoe Point

- Location in Hawaiʻi County and the state of Hawaii
- Coordinates: 19°59′4″N 155°14′0″W
- Country: United States
- State: Hawaii
- County: Hawaiʻi

Area
  - Total: 3.49 sq mi (9.05 km^{2})
  - Land: 3.24 sq mi (8.39 km^{2})
  - Water: 0.25 sq mi (0.66 km^{2})
- Elevation: 360 ft (110 m)

Population (2020)
  - Total: 1,147
  - Density: 353.9/sq mi (136.64/km^{2})
- Time zone: UTC-10 (Hawaii-Aleutian)
- ZIP code: 96764
- Area code: 808
- FIPS code: 15-44150
- GNIS feature ID: 0361749

Laupāhoehoe is a census-designated place (CDP) in Hawaiʻi County, Hawaii, United States, in the District of North Hilo. The population was 581 at the 2010 census, up from 473 at the 2000 census. The community's name means "lava tip" and refers to the angular lava tip or cape formed by ancient pāhoehoe (smooth lava) flows which created the cape on which the community was built.

== History ==
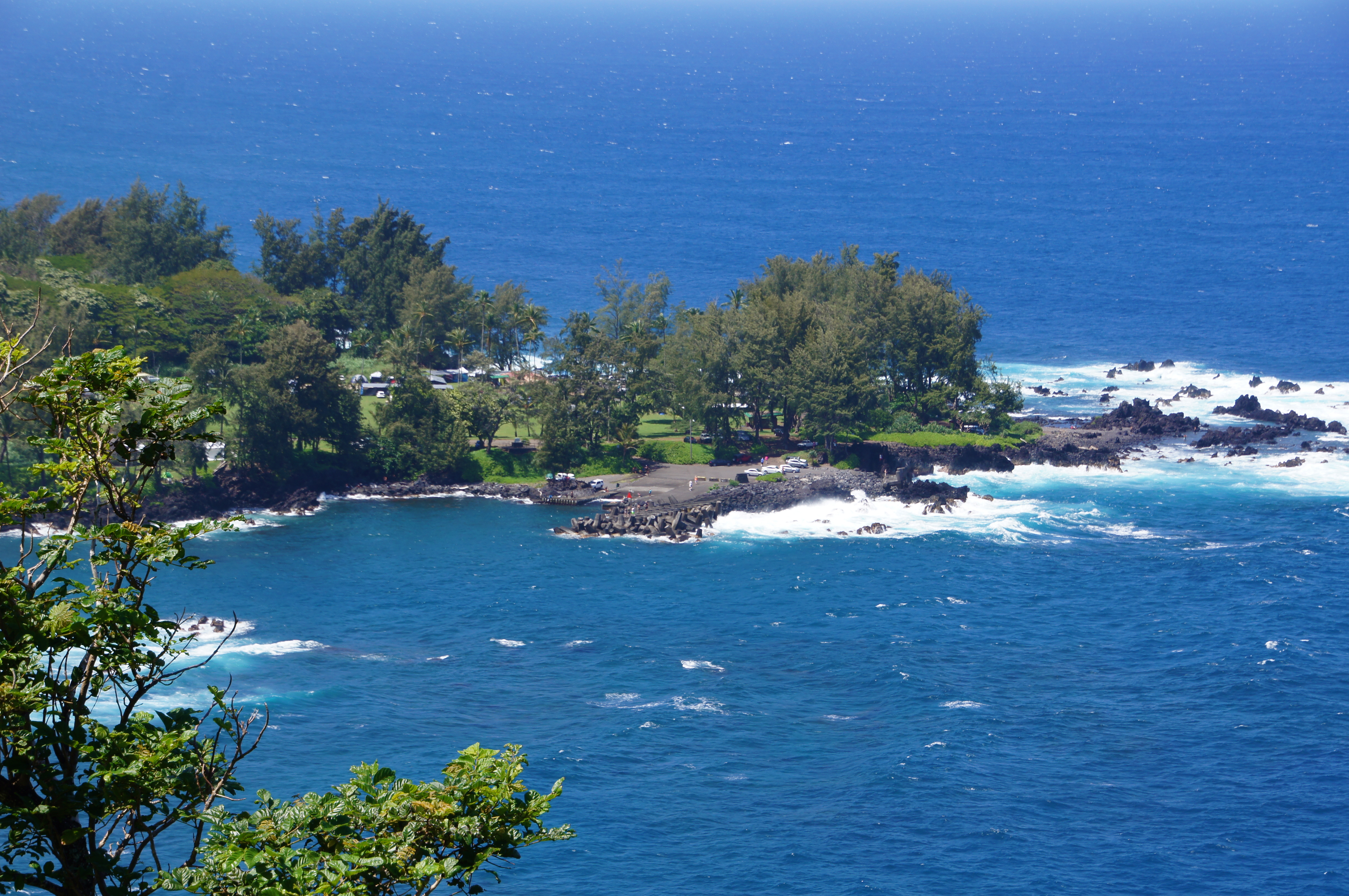
View of Laupāhoehoe Point from the highway near the signage shown below

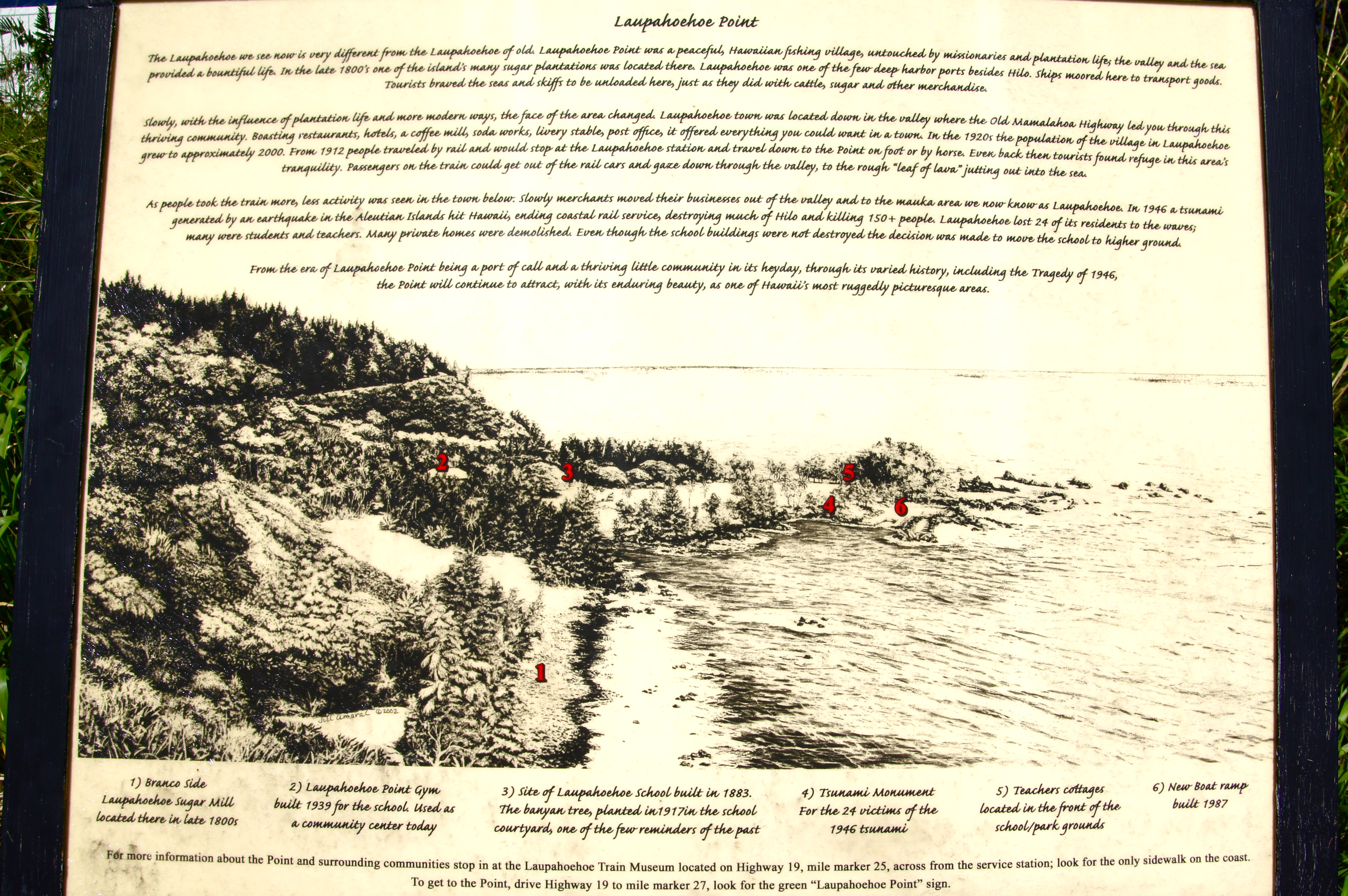
Road signage overlooking Laupāhoehoe Point

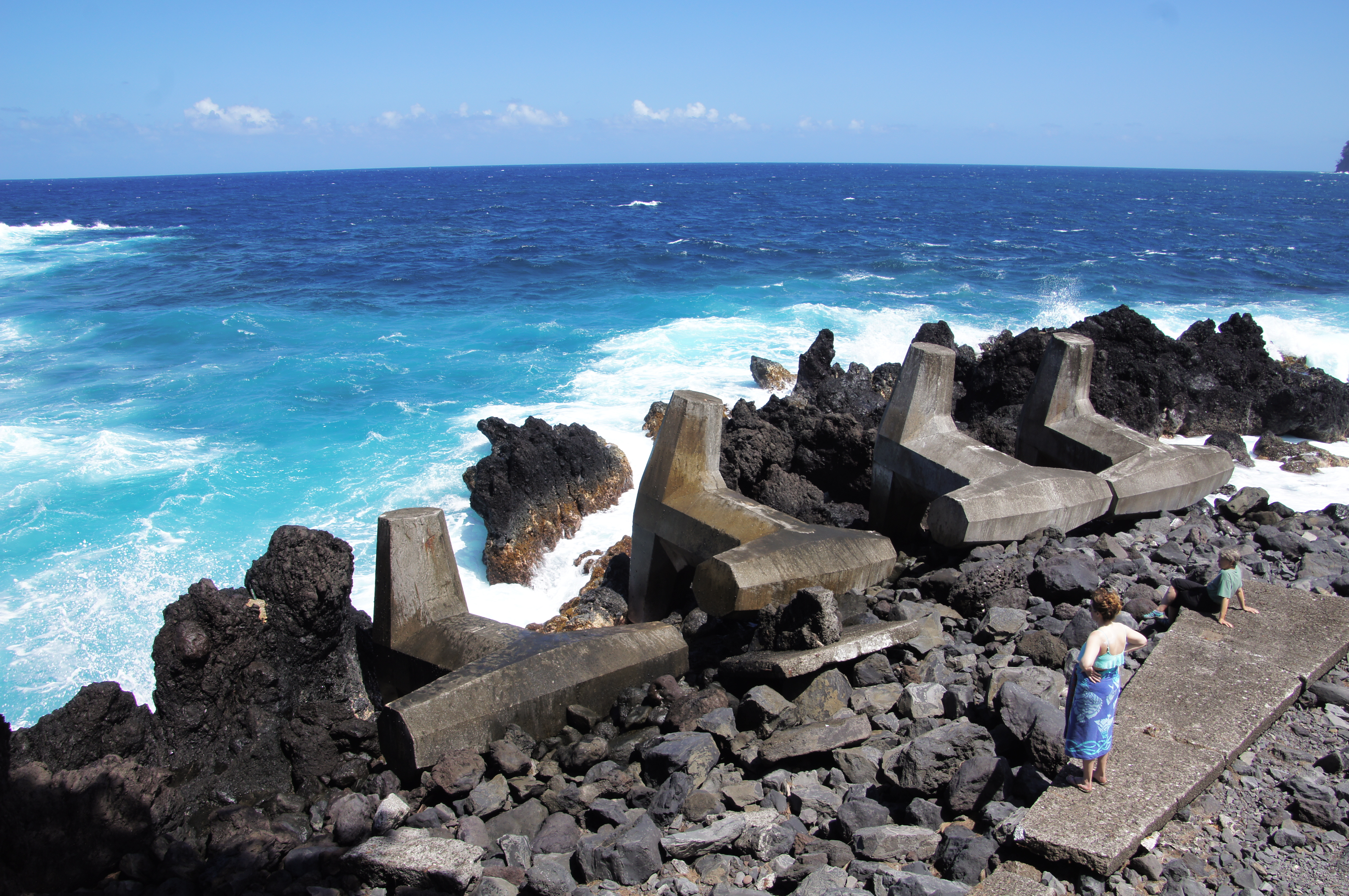
Concrete reinforcements at Laupāhoehoe

On April 1, 1946, the Hawaiian Islands were struck by the so-called "April Fools Day tsunami", originating from the Aleutian Islands earthquake. Approximately 159 people in the islands were killed. The tsunami had the largest impact on the Big Island, with the greatest number of deaths occurring in Hilo with 96 fatalities. The school building at Laupāhoehoe was inundated by the tsunami and 24 people drowned. Of the dead, 16 were schoolchildren, four were teachers, and four were residents. A monument to the dead now stands on Laupāhoehoe Point.

== Geography ==
Laupāhoehoe is located on the northeast side of the island of Hawaii, at 19°59′5″N 155°14′10″W (19.983296, -155.235889). Hawaii Route 19 passes through the community, leading southeast 24 miles (39 km) to Hilo and west 32 miles (51 km) to Waimea.

According to the United States Census Bureau, the CDP has a total area of 2.4 square miles (6.2 km^{2}), of which 2.1 square miles (5.5 km^{2}) are land and 0.3 square miles (0.7 km^{2}), or 10.66%, are water.

=== Climate ===
Climate data for Kīhālani, Hawaii, 1991–2020 normals, extremes 1998–2014
Month	Jan	Feb	Mar	Apr	May	Jun	Jul	Aug	Sep	Oct	Nov	Dec	Year
Record high °F (°C)	85 (29)	86 (30)	89 (32)	84 (29)	88 (31)	86 (30)	85 (29)	88 (31)	88 (31)	87 (31)	86 (30)	85 (29)	89 (32)
Mean daily maximum °F (°C)	76.1 (24.5)	75.5 (24.2)	76.1 (24.5)	77.1 (25.1)	78.1 (25.6)	79.3 (26.3)	79.9 (26.6)	81.1 (27.3)	81.3 (27.4)	80.4 (26.9)	78.2 (25.7)	76.2 (24.6)	78.3 (25.7)
Daily mean °F (°C)	68.7 (20.4)	68.4 (20.2)	69.1 (20.6)	70.0 (21.1)	71.5 (21.9)	72.4 (22.4)	73.3 (22.9)	74.1 (23.4)	73.9 (23.3)	73.4 (23.0)	71.7 (22.1)	69.8 (21.0)	71.4 (21.9)
Mean daily minimum °F (°C)	61.4 (16.3)	61.3 (16.3)	62.1 (16.7)	63.0 (17.2)	65.0 (18.3)	65.6 (18.7)	66.6 (19.2)	67.1 (19.5)	66.5 (19.2)	66.5 (19.2)	65.2 (18.4)	63.4 (17.4)	64.5 (18.0)
Record low °F (°C)	55 (13)	56 (13)	55 (13)	55 (13)	58 (14)	60 (16)	61 (16)	60 (16)	61 (16)	61 (16)	58 (14)	57 (14)	55 (13)
Average precipitation inches (mm)	10.39 (264)	12.64 (321)	17.34 (440)	14.57 (370)	7.79 (198)	6.50 (165)	12.05 (306)	16.85 (428)	7.25 (184)	11.02 (280)	16.25 (413)	15.54 (395)	148.19 (3,764)
Average precipitation days (≥ 0.01 in)	15.8	17.3	22.0	23.3	19.5	23.6	24.0	25.4	20.8	21.9	21.3	19.8	254.7
Source 1: NOAA
Source 2: XMACIS2

== Demographics ==
Historical population
Census	Pop.	Note	%±
2020	1,147		—
U.S. Decennial Census

As of the census of 2010, there were 581 people in 214 households residing in the CDP. The population density was 276.7 people per square mile (106.8 people/km^{2}). There were 243 housing units at an average density of 115.7 per square mile (44.7/km^{2}). The racial makeup of the CDP was 36.49% White, 0.34% African American, 0.17% American Indian & Alaska Native, 24.44% Asian, 4.82% Native Hawaiian & Pacific Islander, 0.86% from other races, and 32.87% from two or more races. Hispanic or Latino of any race were 18.59% of the population.

There were 214 households, out of which 28.0% had children under the age of 18 living with them. The average household size was 2.71.

In the Laupāhoehoe CDP the population was spread out, with 23.9% under the age of 18, 5.0% from 18 to 24, 12.9% from 25 to 34, 15.1% from 35 to 49, 26.0% from 50 to 64, and 17.0% who were 65 years of age or older. For every 100 females there were 105.3 males. For every 100 males there were 95.0 females.

The median income for a household in the CDP at the 2000 census was $29,250, and the median income for a family in 2000 was $30,000. Males had a median income in 2000 of $21,667 versus $21,607 for females. The per capita income for the CDP in 2000 was $11,896. About 28.4% of families and 25.2% of the population were below the poverty line in 2000, including 41.1% of those under age 18 and 14.0% of those age 65 or over.

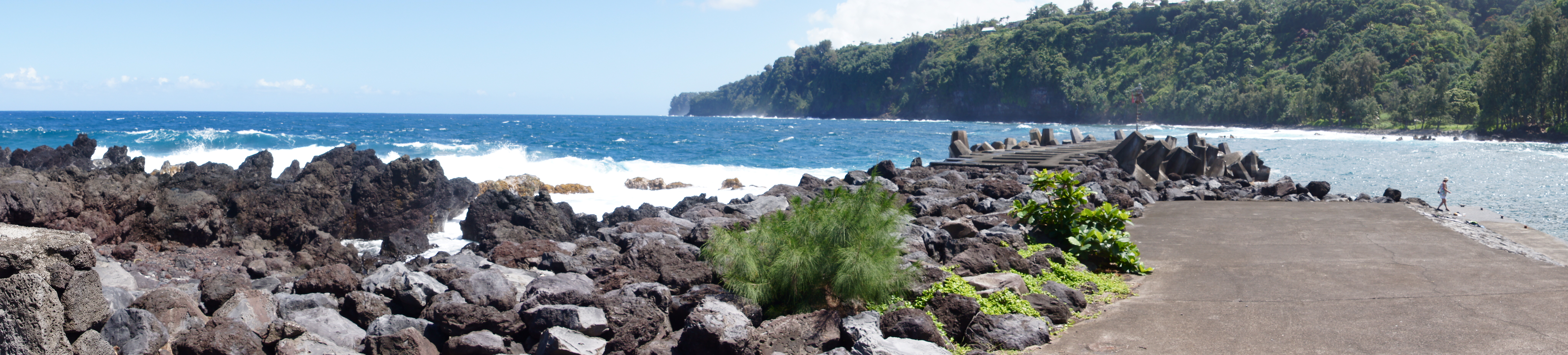
The breakwater and boat launch at Laupāhoehoe

== Education ==
The statewide school district is the Hawaii State Department of Education, and it covers Hawaii County. Laupāhoehoe Community Public Charter School is in the community.

The Hawaii State Public Library System operates the Laupahoehoe Public and School Library.
