= C. Brewer & Co. =

Agricultural company in Hawaii

C. Brewer & Co., Ltd.
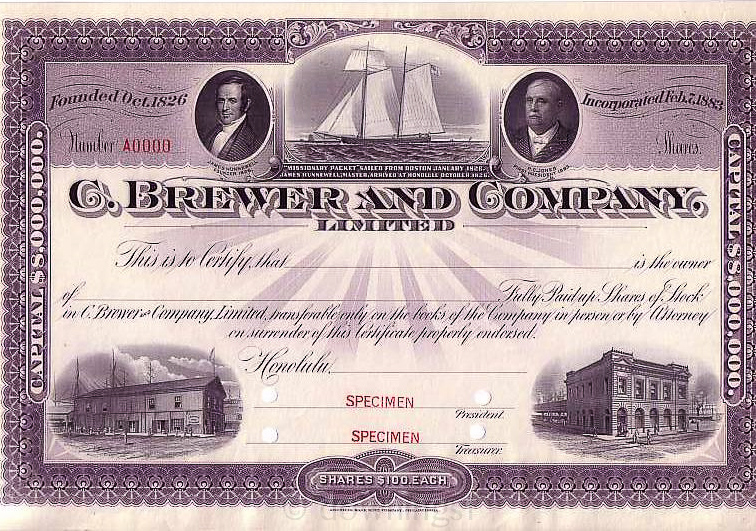
- C.Brewer and Company Specimen Stock Certificate #A0000, made by American Bank Note Co.
- Industry: Agriculture
- Founded: 1826
- Founder: Captain James Hunnewell
- Defunct: 2006
- Fate: Liquidated in 2001, dissolved in 2006

C. Brewer & Co., Ltd. was a Honolulu-based company that was once part of the Big Five companies in territorial Hawaii. The company did most of its business in agriculture.

== History ==
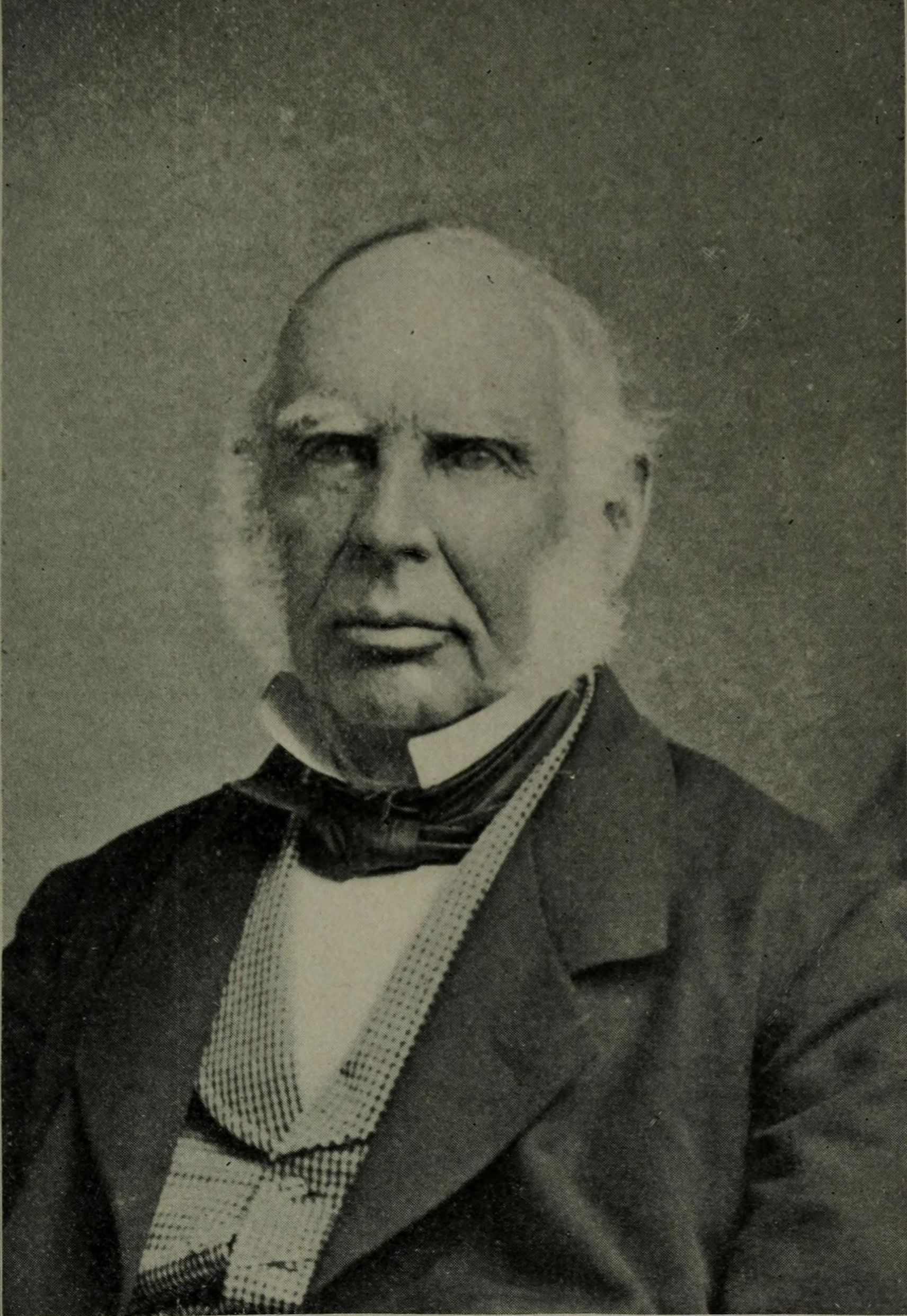
Charles Brewer (1804–1885)

The company was founded by Captain James Hunnewell (1794–1869) of Massachusetts in 1826, making it the oldest of the Big Five companies. The company originally traded sandalwood with China. Henry Augustus Peirce (1808–1885) joined in 1828 as a clerk, and worked his way up to a partner. Peirce took over when Hunnewell left in 1830. Charles Brewer (1804–1885), the master of Peirce's ships, became a partner in December 1835 and the business was known as Peirce & Brewer.

Peirce retired to a life as a diplomat in 1843, and the company was renamed after Brewer, who shifted the company's focus to supplying whaling ships and general merchandise. Brewer ran the business with his nephew Charles Brewer II (1823–1863) until 1845, and returned to Boston in 1849 on the ship that brought the first gold from the California Gold Rush. He continued to be an investor and convinced Peirce and Hunnewell to rejoin him for a while. James Fowler Baldwin Marshall and Francis Johnson took over management of the Honolulu business. Stephen H. Williams and Benjamin F. Snow continued the business in the 1850s. Charles Brewer II ran the business again in 1859, reviving the C. Brewer & Co. name. Sherman Peck (1800–1871) and Charles H. Lunt took over in 1861 when the younger Brewer retired. Henry Alpheus Peirce Carter became a partner in 1862 until 1874.

In 1863, the company entered Hawaii's sugar cane industry, managing three plantations on Maui. Peter Cushman Jones became a partner in 1871, and its president from 1883 until 1891. In 1904, the company purchased the Pepeekeo Sugar Company on the island of Hawaii.

The company emerged to become one of Hawaii's Big Five companies, albeit the smallest. By 1925, after more consolidation, C. Brewer handled 25% of the islands' sugar and was one of Hawaii's largest corporate landholders. In 1930, the new C. Brewer headquarters building was built at 827 Fort Street in the heart of Downtown Honolulu's business district, and is on the National Register of Historic Places listings in Oahu. In 1959, seeing the need for further diversification, the company entered the macadamia nut industry, and in the 1990s produced the majority of the world's macadamia nuts under the name Mauna Loa Macadamia Nut Corporation. C. Brewer acquired Fajardo Eastern Sugar Associates in Puerto Rico in 1961, but closed the business six years later.

Between 1978 and 1986, the company was owned by IU International Corporation. In 1986, the company's Hawaii president led a $200 million buyout by other executives, investors, and friends. The move once again put control of the company into Hawaii hands, but it left the company in heavy debt. The macadamia orchards were spun off as a separate company. C. Brewer closed down its sugar business on Maui in 1988 and on the Big Island in 1994. Its real estate business was spun off in 1993. The company moved to Hilo, Hawaii in 1998.

By the end of the 20th century, the company still owned some 70,000 acres (28,000 ha) throughout the state. In 2000, Mauna Loa Macadamia Nut was sold to The Shansby Group. In 2001, however, the company's shareholders voted to liquidate C. Brewer & Co., Ltd. The company formally dissolved in 2006. The company's chairman, John W. A. "Doc" Buyers, bought a large portion of the company's assets in 2001, and formed a successor company called D. Buyers Enterprises, focused on the "wellness" industry. Buyers died in 2006 and D. Buyers liquidated in 2010.

== Archives and records ==
- James Hunnewell papers at Baker Library Special Collections, Harvard Business School.
- (1884 Book) Reminisces, by Charles Brewer
