= Kapalua Resort =

Resort in Hawaii

Coordinates: 21°00′05″N 156°39′15″W

Kapalua Resort Logo

Kapalua Resort is a golf and beach resort in Kapalua, Hawaii on the northwest shore of the island of Maui near Lahaina, Hawaii. It is owned by TY Corporation.

== Description ==
Surrounded by 22,000 acres (89 km^{2}) from the verdant mountain ridges and summit of Puʻu Kukui to lava rock bays, Kapalua Resort is set amidst two nature preserves and former pineapple fields. Three beaches and the Kapalua Adventures zipline tours and activities are nearby. In the resort are the 5-acre (20,000 m^{2}) Kapalua Spa, and a variety of restaurants and shops, including the historic Honolua Store. Kapalua Farms sells organic produce and eggs to resort restaurants and the Maui community as well as Pineapple farm tours.

Kapalua Resort include several residential communities, from mountain slopes to beach front: the Kapalua Ritz-Carlton Hotel; several vacation home rental programs, and the Kapalua Tennis Garden complex. Other services include the Kapalua Adventure Center and the Cafe Kapalua bistro.

== Golf ==
The resort has two golf courses: The Bay Course and The Plantation Course. The Bay Course meanders around historic buildings and tropical gardens to the coastline. It was the host course to the Kapalua LPGA Classic, a full-field tournament on the LPGA Tour in 2008. The Plantation Course is a traditional links style course with panoramic mountain and ocean views. It is home to The Sentry, the season-opening event on the PGA Tour, each January.

The Plantation Course is unique among PGA Tour courses in several ways. It is the only course on the tour that plays to par 73; all others play to pars between 70 and 72. It is also the only course with seven holes of more than 500 yards, but at the same time is one of only two courses (Pebble Beach being the other) with six par-4s of less than 400 yards. The elevation changes on the course are starkly illustrated by looking at the 17th, 18th, and 1st holes as a set. The 17th starts atop a mountain, and the course slopes downward through the 18th, with the 1st completing the descent. These three holes play to a combined 1,691 yards for the tour professionals, with only the 18th (at 663 yards) being par-5.

The Plantation Course and The Bay Course are owned by TY Management. On April 1, 2011, Troon Golf was selected to oversee the golf operations at both courses.

The Bay Course
Tee	Rating/Slope	1	2	3	4	5	6	7	8	9	Out	10	11	12	13	14	15	16	17	18	In	Total
Championship	72.7 / 137	355	162	453	527	408	220	345	349	539	3358	371	192	562	504	372	189	357	195	500	3242	6600
Combo	71.4 / 135	355	162	413	527	408	170	345	315	522	3217	345	168	530	504	372	176	357	154	471	3077	6294
Regular	70.4 / 132	331	135	413	489	366	170	333	315	522	3074	345	168	530	472	340	176	321	154	471	2977	6051
Resort	68.3 / 126	314	128	399	479	350	155	305	308	451	2889	324	144	492	450	329	158	306	152	442	2797	5686
SI	Men's	5	17	15	1	9	7	13	3	11		2	6	18	8	16	14	10	4	12
Par		4	3	4	5	4	3	4	4	5	36	4	3	5	5	4	3	4	3	5	36	72
Combo	71.7 / 129	304	128	372	479	350	155	305	291	451	2835	284	125	411	450	329	158	281	135	406	2579	5414
Forward	70.2 / 124	304	112	372	432	341	84	300	291	412	2648	284	125	411	406	282	141	281	135	406	2471	5119
SI	Ladies'	5	13	17	1	11	15	7	3	9		2	14	6	8	16	12	10	4	18

The Plantation Course
Tee	Rating/Slope	1	2	3	4	5	6	7	8	9	Out	10	11	12	13	14	15	16	17	18	In	Total
Tour	77.0 / 144	520	219	424	422	526	424	522	199	550	3806	384	161	424	383	301	541	369	550	677	3790	7596
Championship	75.5 / 140	470	219	379	382	526	397	522	199	514	3608	348	161	424	383	301	541	369	513	636	3676	7284
Combo	74.0 / 137	470	199	363	310	526	397	491	186	492	3434	348	161	366	347	301	500	369	513	599	3504	6938
Regular	72.8 / 134	433	199	363	310	484	375	491	186	492	3333	308	161	366	347	271	500	354	462	599	3368	6701
Combo	71.6 / 130	433	173	363	310	484	375	480	170	440	3228	277	161	321	296	271	500	302	452	599	3179	6407
Resort	70.0 / 127	433	173	345	212	445	312	480	170	440	3010	277	144	321	296	263	464	302	452	548	3067	6077
Par	Men's	4	3	4	4	5	4	4	3	5	36	4	3	4	4	4	5	4	4	5	37	73
SI	Men's	1	17	3	11	13	15	5	9	7		12	16	14	4	18	6	10	2	8
Combo	72.5 / 129	380	133	258	212	445	294	460	141	383	2706	246	121	294	296	225	464	266	423	503	2838	5544
Forward	70.2 / 124	380	133	258	212	314	294	460	141	383	2575	246	121	294	193	225	335	266	423	503	2606	5181
Par	Ladies'	4	3	4	4	4	4	5	3	5	36	4	3	4	4	4	5	4	5	5	38	74
SI	Ladies'	5	17	9	15	3	13	7	11	1		8	18	16	10	14	6	12	2	4

== History ==
Colin Cameron, son of J. Walter Cameron (1895–1976) and grandson of Henry Alexander Baldwin (1871–1946) founded the resort. It is operated by the Maui Land & Pineapple Company. The name kapa lua means "two borders" in the Hawaiian language. The beach was called "Fleming's" after David Thomas Fleming (1881-1955) manager of Honolua Ranch, who introduced pineapple as a major crop to the area. His 1915 house became the Pineapple Hill restaurant in 1964 until it closed in 1996.

A new spa was going to be developed by Miraval resorts, but the partnership was terminated in May 2005.

Alexander & Baldwin family tree

William P. Alexander (1805–1884)	Mary Ann McKinney (1810–1888)	Amos Starr Cooke (1810–1871)	Juliette Montague (1812–1896)	Dwight Baldwin (1798–1886)	Charlotte Fowler (1805–1873)	J. W. Smith (1810–1887
David Dwight Baldwin (1831–1912)	W. O. Smith (1848–1929)
William D. Alexander (1833–1913)	Abigail Baldwin (1847–1912)	Samuel T. Alexander (1836–1904)	Martha Eliza Cooke	Ann Elizabeth Alexander (1843–1940)	Henry P. Baldwin (1842–1911)	Emily Whitney Alexander (1846–1943)
Agnes Alexander (1875–1971)	Annie Montague Alexander (1867–1950)	C.W. Dickey (1871–1942)	Belle Dickey (1880–1972)	James Dole (1877–1958)	Henry Alexander Baldwin (1871–1946)	Ethel Frances Smith (1879–1967)
J. Walter Cameron (1895–1976)	Francis Baldwin (1904–1996)
Colin C. Cameron (1927–1992) (Kapalua)
