= Samuel Thomas Alexander =

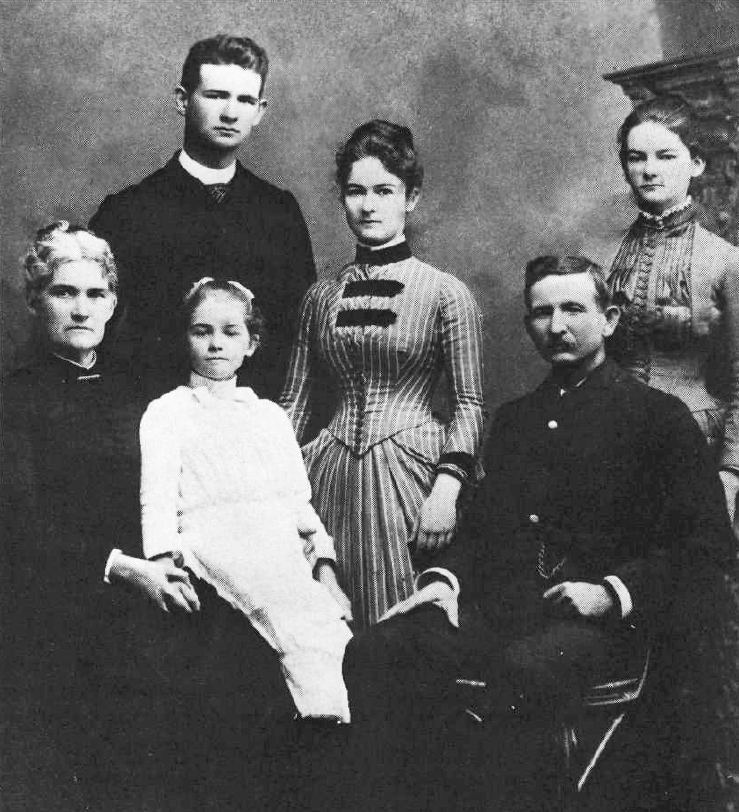
- With his family in the 1880s
- Born: October 29, 1836; Hanalei, Hawaii
- Died: September 10, 1904 (aged 67); Victoria Falls, Northern Rhodesia, modern day Zambia. Buried in the Old Drift cemetery, Livingstone, Zambia
- Occupation: Businessman
- Spouse: Martha Eliza Cooke
- Children: Juliette; Annie Montague Alexander; Wallace M. Alexander; Martha
- Father: William Alexander
- Relatives: Anne Alexander Dickey (sister); William DeWitt Alexander (brother)

Samuel Thomas Alexander (October 29, 1836 – September 10, 1904) co-founded a major agricultural and transportation business in the Kingdom of Hawaii.

== Early life ==
In November 1831, the Reverend William Patterson Alexander (1805–1884) and Mary Ann McKinney Alexander (1810–1888) arrived in April 1832 as missionaries to the Hawaiian Islands. Samuel Thomas was born October 29, 1836, at the Waiʻoli mission in what is now Hanalei on the northern coast of Kauaʻi island.

In 1843 the family moved to the Lahainaluna School, where they became friends with the family of Dwight Baldwin who had arrived in the previous company in 1831. Alexander's education was sporadic; he went to Punahou School for various times between 1841 and 1859 In 1857 he and Frederick S. Lyman (son of missionary David Belden Lyman) went to California in a late wave of the California Gold Rush, but came back empty handed. He then went to Williams College for one year, and then Westfield School in Massachusetts. He followed his father's footsteps and taught at Lahainaluna briefly. In 1863 Alexander became manager of the Waiheʻe sugarcane plantation near Wailuku, hiring Henry Perrine Baldwin (1842–1911) as assistant.

== Business and adventure ==
On January 26, 1864, Alexander married Martha Eliza Cooke, daughter of Amos Starr Cooke, one of two former missionary who founded the Castle & Cooke company. Abigail Charlette Baldwin (1847–1912) married his older brother William DeWitt Alexander (1833–1913) in 1861. William was a teacher and then president of Punahou School. In 1869 his sister Emily Whitney Alexander married Henry Perrine Baldwin.

In 1870 he formed the Pāʻia plantation under the name Samuel T Alexander & Co. With Baldwin, he purchased 561 acres (2.3 km^{2}) between Pāʻia and Makawao, where they cultivated sugarcane. In 1871 Alexander managed the Haʻikū sugar mill which had been constructed in 1861 by Castle & Cooke.

The Reciprocity Treaty of 1875 removed tariffs on sugar exported to the United States. But to raise their production a steady supply of water was needed for the semi-arid dry forests of Pāʻia. Alexander realized that rain was plentiful miles away in the rainforests on the windward slopes of Haleakalā mountain. Alexander proposed a 17-mile-long (27 km) irrigation aqueduct that diverted water from that part of Haleakalā to their plantation. Alexander knew about irrigation systems used since ancient Hawaii while he was at Lahainaluna, but this was on a much larger scale. He negotiated a lease of water rights from King Kalākaua and raised financing from other partners. It was initially a 20-year lease for $100 per year. His brother James did a survey. Work started on the aqueduct in 1876 and was completed two years later in 1878 (at over three times the estimated cost), just before a deadline in the lease. In 1883 the Alexander family moved to Oakland, California, to get medical attention for his father, who died there August 13, 1884.

After completion of the aqueduct, the company grew by selling water to adjacent plantations, and was eventually renamed Alexander & Baldwin Plantation. In 1884 Alexander arranged for the partners to buy the small American Sugar Refinery in California, and later organized a group of Hawaiian planters called the Sugar Factors which became the California and Hawaiian Sugar Company (C&H). Between 1872 and 1900, the company took over more land and sugar mill operations. In 1898, Alexander and Baldwin purchased a controlling interest in one of its rival companies, Hawaiian Commercial & Sugar Company (HC&S) from Claus Spreckels. By 1899, the company bought two of Maui’s railroad lines. On June 30, 1900, Alexander & Baldwin, Ltd. was incorporated.

Alexander left running the company to others, and became an adventurer. In 1893 he bicycled through Europe. He traveled through the Pacific Ocean in 1896, including the Marquesas Islands where his parents traveled before he was born, China, and Japan. He also had a winter home on Maui called Olinda, and a summer home in Shasta County, California.

== Legacy ==
Alexander & Baldwin became one of the "Big Five" corporations that dominated the economy of the Territory of Hawaii. A&B is listed on the New York Stock Exchange and was added as part of the Dow Jones Transportation Average after purchasing Matson Navigation Company. It continues to produce sugar and founded a museum on Maui in 1980 which is now an independent non-profit organization.

Alexander had two sons and three daughters. Wallace M. Alexander went on to serve as chairman of Alexander & Baldwin and as a trustee of Stanford University, as director of the California and Hawaiian Sugar Company and Pacific Gas and Electric Company, and died November 22, 1939. Wallace's daughter Martha Alexander Gerbode (1909–1971) became an environmental activist and philanthropist.

Alexander's daughters were Juliette Alexander (1865–1948), Annie Montague Alexander (1867–1950), and Martha Mabel Alexander (1878–1970). A second son, Clarence Chambers, died young (1880–1884).

In 1904, Samuel Alexander arranged a trip with daughter Annie and Thomas L. Gulick, son of another missionary Peter Johnson Gulick (1796–1877). The men were looking forward to hunting big game in Africa, while Annie was developing an interest in paleontology. Gulick became ill and died August 15, 1904, in Kijabe, Kenya. On September 8 the Alexanders reached Victoria Falls. The next day they crossed the Zambezi river and climbed down the canyon for a better view. While posing for a picture, Samuel was hit by a boulder tossed down from workers above that crushed his foot. He was buried at the Old Drift cemetery after dying a day later on September 10, 1904.

Annie continued to go on expeditions through her 80th birthday, and founded two museums. Samuel also has a monument in Mountain View Cemetery in Oakland where other family members are buried.

Martha Mabel married John Thomas Waterhouse (1873–1945) in 1900. The swimming pool at Punahou School was named for their daughter Elizabeth Pinder Waterhouse (1903–1920) who was a student there when she died. The track field is named for Samuel.

== Family tree ==
Alexander & Baldwin family tree

William P. Alexander (1805–1884)	Mary Ann McKinney (1810–1888)	Amos Starr Cooke (1810–1871)	Juliette Montague (1812–1896)	Dwight Baldwin (1798–1886)	Charlotte Fowler (1805–1873)	J. W. Smith (1810–1887
David Dwight Baldwin (1831–1912)	W. O. Smith (1848–1929)
William D. Alexander (1833–1913)	Abigail Baldwin (1847–1912)	Samuel T. Alexander (1836–1904)	Martha Eliza Cooke	Ann Elizabeth Alexander (1843–1940)	Henry P. Baldwin (1842–1911)	Emily Whitney Alexander (1846–1943)
Agnes Alexander (1875–1971)	Annie Montague Alexander (1867–1950)	C.W. Dickey (1871–1942)	Belle Dickey (1880–1972)	James Dole (1877–1958)	Henry Alexander Baldwin (1871–1946)	Ethel Frances Smith (1879–1967)
J. Walter Cameron (1895–1976)	Francis Baldwin (1904–1996)
Colin C. Cameron (1927–1992) (Kapalua)

== See also ==
- Alexander & Baldwin Sugar Museum
