= Wallace M. Alexander =

American businessman, philanthropist

- Born: November 10, 1869; Maui, Kingdom of Hawaii
- Died: November 22, 1939 (aged 70); Honolulu, Hawaii
- Education: Yale University
- Occupations: Businessman, philanthropist
- Political party: Republican Party
- Spouse: Mary S. Baker
- Father: Samuel Thomas Alexander
- Relatives: William Patterson Alexander (paternal grandfather); Amos Starr Cooke (maternal grandfather)

Wallace M. Alexander (1869–1939) was an American heir, businessman and philanthropist.

== Biography ==
=== Early life ===
Wallace McKinney Alexander was born on November 10, 1869, in Maui, Hawaii. His father was Samuel Thomas Alexander. His mother was Martha E. (Cooke) Alexander. His paternal grandfather, William Patterson Alexander, was a missionary in Hawaii. His maternal grandfather, Amos Starr Cooke, was a Hawaii missionary and founder of the Castle & Cooke company.

Alexander grew up in Oakland, California, and was educated at Oakland High School, then Phillips Andover Academy in Andover, Massachusetts. He graduated from Yale University in 1892.

=== Career ===
Alexander owned sugarcane plantations as well as sugar refining factories in Hawaii. He served on the Board of Directors of Alexander and Baldwin. He also served as the Vice President of the Matson Navigation Company and the Honolulu Oil Corporation.

He served as president of the San Francisco Chamber of Commerce. He was also a powerbroker in the Republican Party of San Francisco. In 1928, he suggested prohibiting mutual immigration between the United States and Japan; the idea was rejected by Japan.

=== Philanthropy ===
Alexander served on the board of trustees of the Carnegie Endowment for International Peace. He was a member of the Japan Society of San Francisco and a co-founder of the Institute of Pacific Relations. He supported the Boy Scouts of America.

He served as president of the San Francisco Opera. He also served on the Board of Trustees of Stanford University in Stanford, near Palo Alto, having been first elected in 1924 and re-elected in 1934.

He received the Legion of Honor from France in 1937.

=== Personal life ===
Alexander married Mary S. Baker in 1904, a classmate for when Alexander attended Oakland public schools. As an adult he lived in Piedmont, California, and moved back to Hawaii where he died.

=== Death ===
Alexander died on November 22, 1939, in Honolulu, Hawaii. He was seventy years old.

== See also ==
- Camp Wallace Alexander
