= Mosi-oa-Tunya National Park =

National park in Zambia

- IUCN category II (national park)
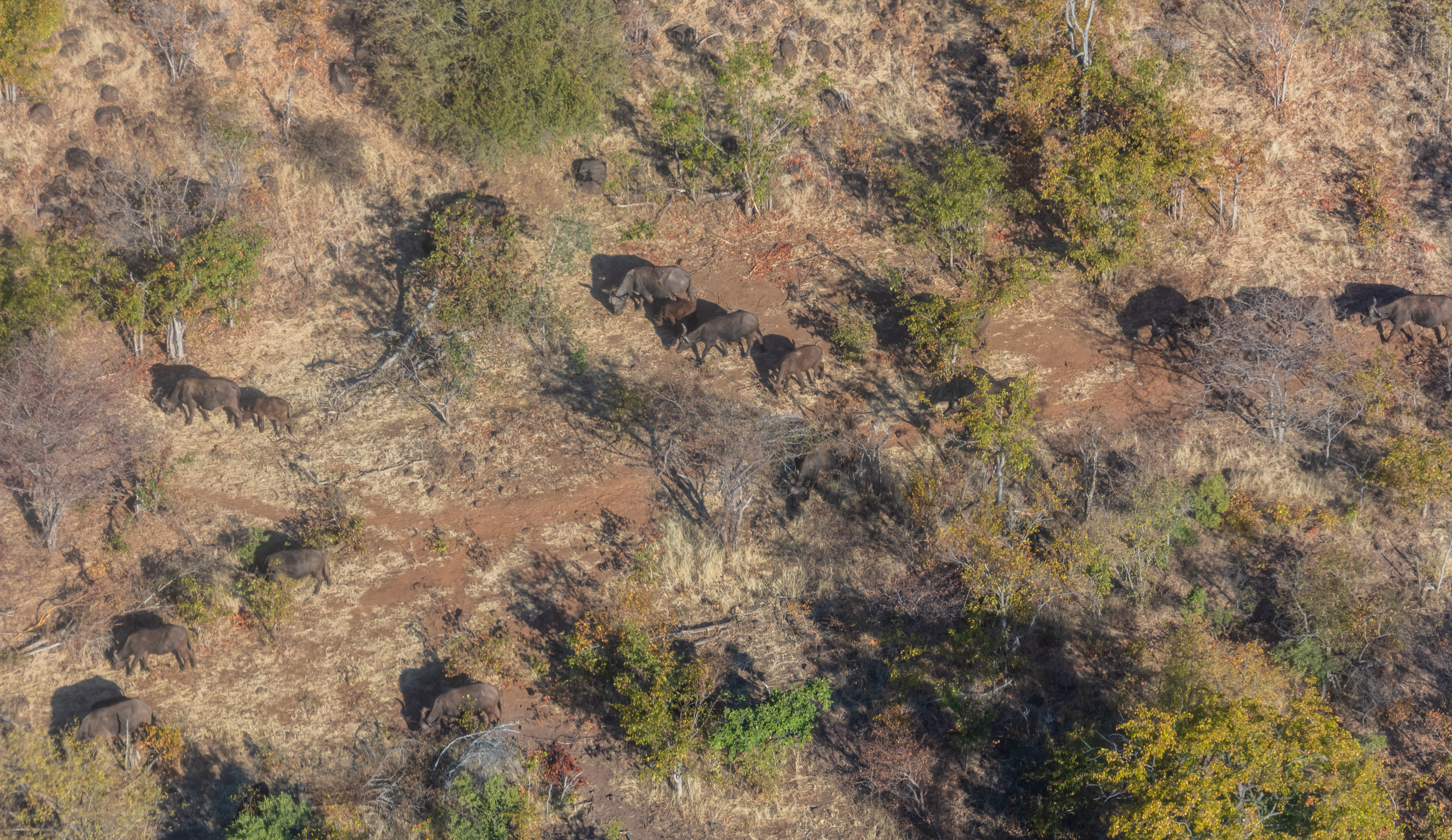
- Aerial view of the national park

- Location within Zambia
- Location: Southern Province, Zambia
- Nearest city: Livingstone
- Coordinates: 17°52′S 25°50′E
- Area: 66 km^{2} (25 sq mi)
- Governing body: Zambia Wildlife Authority

UNESCO World Heritage Site
- Type: Natural
- Criteria: vii, viii
- Designated: 1989
- Reference no.: 509
- Region: Africa

Mosi-oa-Tunya National Park is a national park in Zambia and is a UNESCO World Heritage Site that is home to one-half of the Mosi-oa-Tunya—"The Smoke that Thunders", known worldwide as Victoria Falls—on the Zambezi River. As the river forms the border between Zambia and Zimbabwe, the falls are shared by these two countries, and the park is twin to the Victoria Falls National Park on the Zimbabwean side.

‘Mosi-oa-Tunya’ comes from the Kololo or Lozi language, and the name is now used throughout Zambia and in parts of Zimbabwe.

Mosi-oa-Tunya National Park covers 66 km^{2} (25 sq mi) from the Songwe Gorge below the falls in a north-west arc along about 20 km (12 mi) of the Zambian river bank. It forms the south-western boundary of the city of Livingstone and has two main sections, each with separate entrances: a wildlife park at its north-western end and the land adjacent to the Victoria Falls themselves, which in the rainy season form the world's largest curtain of falling water. It extends downstream from the falls and to the south-east along the Batoka Gorges.

== The wildlife section of the park ==
The wildlife park includes tall riverine forest with palm trees, miombo woodland and grassland with plenty of birds and animals, including Angolan giraffe, Burchell's zebra, warthog, sable, African buffalo, impala and other antelope. Animal numbers have fallen in droughts since 2000.

The park currently has ten southern white rhinos, including calves. These are not indigenous to Zambia; they were imported from South Africa (the indigenous black rhino had been extirpated from the country, though a pilot project is reintroducing them in North Luangwa National Park). The original introduction consisted of two rhinos; both were poached during the night of June 6, 2007. One was shot dead not far from the gate and its horn extracted; the other suffered serious bullet wounds but survived and still lives in the park under 24-hour surveillance. By 2009, the number of rhinos had increased to five animals, with plans to introduce further ones in due course. As of 2022, there were 10 white rhinos in the park.

African elephants are often seen in the park when they cross the river in the dry season from the Zimbabwean side. Hippopotamus and crocodile can be seen from the river bank. Vervet monkeys and baboons are common, as they are in the rest of the national park outside the wildlife section. As of January 2009, the commercial wildlife company Lion Encounter has been operating a "walking with lions" experience within the park, with further plans to start a breeding program for the lions within the soon-to-be-expanded Dambwa Forest section of the park.

Within the wildlife park is the Old Drift Cemetery, where the first European settlers were buried. They made camp by the river, but kept succumbing to a strange and fatal illness. They blamed the yellow-and-green-barked "fever trees" for this incurable malady, while all the time it was the malarial mosquito causing their demise. Before long the community moved to higher ground and the town of Livingstone emerged.

== The falls section of the park ==
The falls section of the national park includes the rainforest on the cliff opposite the Eastern Cataract, which is sustained by spray from the falls. It contains plants rare for the area such as pod mahogany, ebony, ivory palm, wild date palm and several creepers and lianas. Small antelopes and warthogs inhabit this area, and may also be seen on the paths through the riverine forest leading to the falls.

In November 2005, a new statue of explorer David Livingstone was erected in the park (the original and more famous Livingstone statue is on the Zimbabwean side). A plaque was also unveiled on Livingstone Island to mark the spot from which Livingstone was the first European to see the falls.

The Knife-Edge Bridge was constructed in this area in the 1960s to enable access on foot to the cliffs looking over the Rainbow Falls and the First Gorge's exit to the Boiling Pot in the Second Gorge. A steep footpath also goes down to the Boiling Pot, with views of the Second Gorge and the Victoria Falls Bridge.

In the area directly before the river plunges over Victoria Falls, there is a small undeveloped stretch of the park which is currently the only riverfront location that can be accessed without paying a fee. It is a crucial location for elephants to cross the river.

The tops of the deep gorges below the falls can be reached by road and walking tracks through the park and are good places to see klipspringers, clawless otters and 35 species of raptors, such as the Taita falcon, Verreaux's eagle, peregrine falcon and augur buzzard, all of which breed there.

== Regional context ==
This park is considered for inclusion in the five-nation Kavango–Zambezi Transfrontier Conservation Area.
