= Old Drift cemetery =

Cemetery in Livingstone, Zambia

Coordinates: 17°52′5″S 25°48′1″E

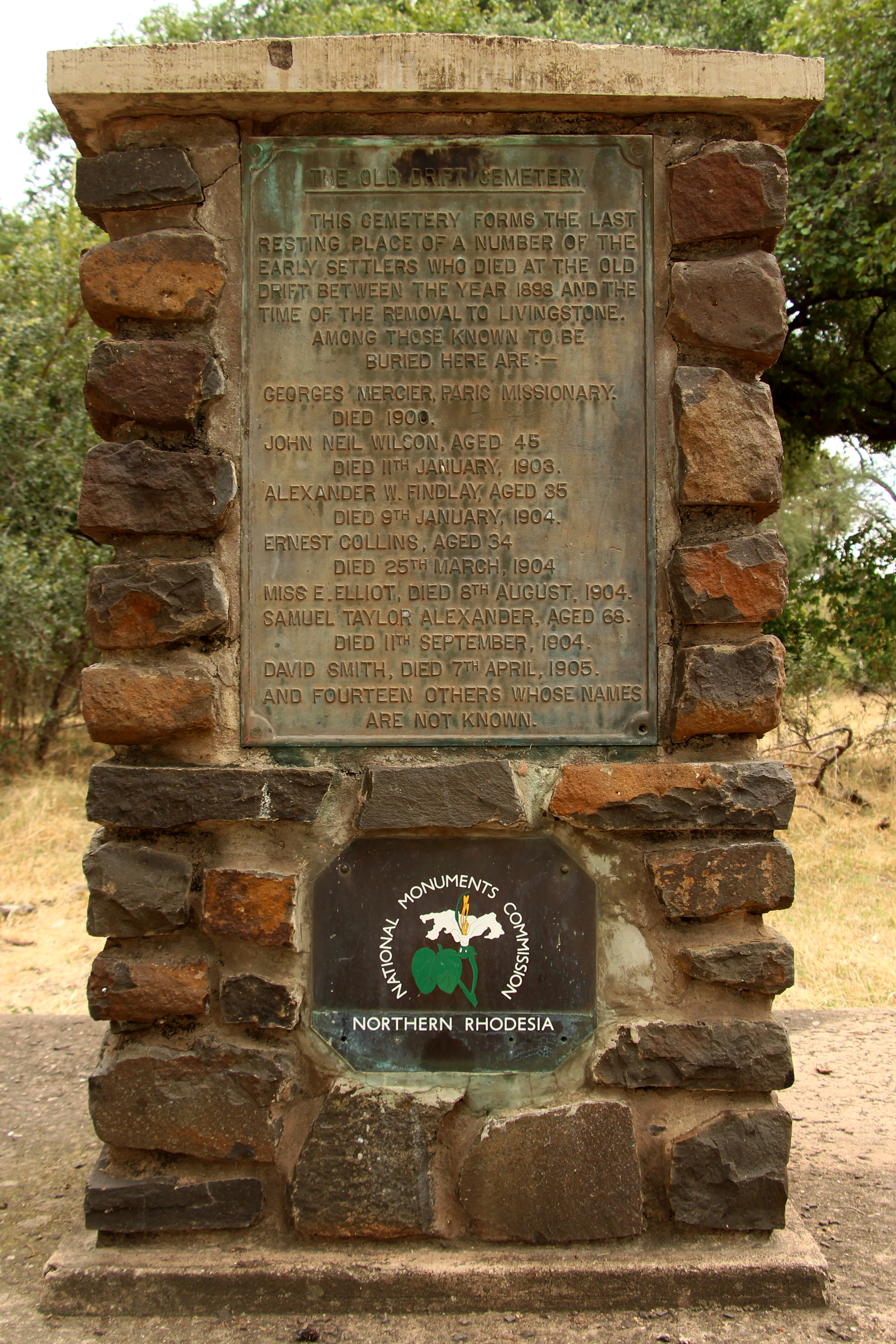

The Old Drift Cemetery is a small burial site near the Zambezi river in modern-day Zambia. It includes the graves of early European settlers and visitors to nearby Victoria Falls who died of causes such as malaria and is located in Mosi-oa-Tunya National Park. Settlers eventually left the area for higher ground, where the town of Livingstone was formed.

A cast-iron plaque on the site reads:

THE OLD DRIFT CEMETERY

This cemetery forms the last resting place of a number of the early settlers who died at the old drift between the year 1898 and the time of the removal to Livingstone.

Among those known to be buried here are:

- Georges Mercier, Paris Missionary, died 1908.
- John Neil Wilson, aged 45, died 11 January 1903.
- Alexander W. Findlay, age 35, died 9 January 1904.
- Ernest Collins, age 34, died 25 March 1904.
- Miss E. Elliott, died 8 August 1904.
- Samuel Thomas Alexander, aged 68, died 11 September 1904.
- David Smith, died 7 April 1905.

And 14 others whose names are not known.
