= Kapalua LPGA Classic =

Golf tournament on US-based LPGA Tour

The Kapalua LPGA Classic was a golf tournament on the United States–based LPGA Tour. The event was played in 2008 at the Kapalua Resort in Kapalua near Lahaina, on the island of Maui in Hawaii.

== History ==
For purposes of qualification for the season-ending LPGA Playoffs at The ADT, it was a "standard" event, which means that players earned points toward the playoffs, but the winner did not receive an automatic playoff spot. The point system was ended after the 2008 season.

The tournament was held for only one year, at the Bay Course at Kapalua Resort. It was originally announced that the tournament would be played for a minimum of three years, and the event was placed on the 2009 LPGA schedule for October 12–18, 2009. However, in June 2009, four months before the tournament was scheduled to take place, event organizers announced its cancellation, citing the lack of a title sponsor.

== Winners ==
Year	Dates	Champion	Country	Score	Purse ($)	Winner's share ($)
2008	Oct 16–19	Morgan Pressel	United States	280 (−8)	1,500,000	225,000

== Tournament record ==
Year	Player	Score	Round
2008	Stacy Lewis	66 (-6)	4th round
