= William DeWitt Alexander =

Hawaiian educator, author, and linguist

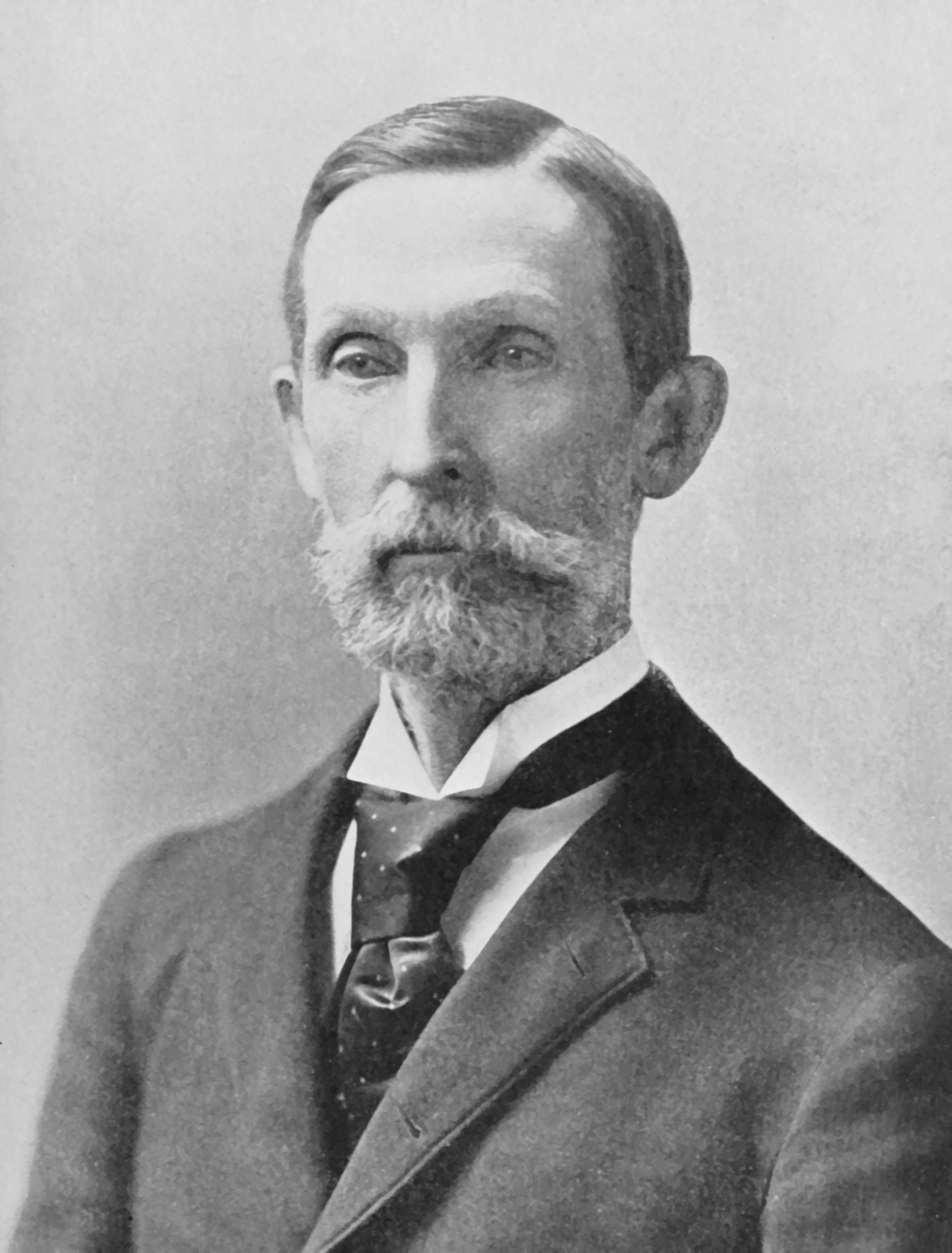
- With his family in the 1880s
- Born: April 2, 1833; Honolulu, Hawaii
- Died: February 21, 1913 (aged 79)
- Occupations: Educator, Surveyor
- Spouse: Abigail Charlotte Baldwin
- Children: 5, including Agnes Baldwin Alexander
- Father: William Patterson Alexander
- Relatives: Anne Alexander Dickey (sister); Samuel Thomas Alexander (brother)

William DeWitt Alexander (April 2, 1833 – February 21, 1913) was an educator, author and linguist in the Kingdom of Hawaii and Republic of Hawaii. He then constructed maps for the Territory of Hawaii.

== Early life ==
Alexander was born in Honolulu April 2, 1833. His father was missionary William Patterson Alexander and mother Mary Ann McKinney. He was named after William Radcliffe DeWitt (1792–1867) a Presbyterian pastor of his mother, who convinced her and her brother Edmund McKinney to become missionaries. He graduated from Punahou School in 1849, and traveled to New England to enroll at Yale. He received a BA degree from Yale in 1855 as Salutatorian, a Master of Arts in 1858, and was a member of Skull and Bones. He returned to Hawaii and joined the faculty of Punahou School as a professor of Greek and history. He married Abigail Charlotte Baldwin (1833–1913), daughter of missionary Dwight Baldwin in 1861. He became the fourth president of Oahu College in the summer of 1864, replacing Cyrus T. Mills. Mills and his wife Susan Tolman Mills then founded Mills College.

== Work ==
During this time Alexander published books on Hawaiian history and the Hawaiian language. His younger brother Samuel Thomas Alexander founded Alexander & Baldwin with his wife's brother Henry Perrine Baldwin. The swimming pool and athletic field at the school are named for Alexander family members. In spring 1871 Alexander became Royal Surveyor-General, and Edward Payson Church replaced him as president of Punahou. As the head of the Kingdom's Survey Department, Alexander led a trigonometrical mapping project that eventually produced a map of the islands which the Kingdom showcased at the 1876 World's Fair in Philadelphia. Alexander with Luther Aholo represented the Kingdom of Hawaii at the International Meridian Conference, held in Washington, DC, in October 1884. This conference resulted in the selection of the Greenwich Meridian as an international standard for zero degrees longitude. On November 6, 1874, Alexander was appointed to the Board of education, and then in 1896 Commissioner of Public Instruction. After Hawaii was annexed into the United States in 1898, Alexander was surveyor of the Territory of Hawaii. He assisted the United States Coast and Geodetic Survey in mapping the islands. He was a founding member of the Hawaiian Historical Society (during its second incarnation in 1893) and served as its first corresponding secretary. He wrote many articles for its journal.

== Family and death ==
Yale awarded him an honorary Doctor of laws degree in 1903. He died February 21, 1913, at the Queen's Medical Center in Honolulu. He and his wife are buried in the cemetery at Kawaiahaʻo Church, across the street from where he was born. Daughter Mary Charlotte Alexander (1874–1961) wrote a biography of both her grandfathers and a history of Hawaii. Daughter Agnes Baldwin Alexander (1875–1971) became a follower of the Baháʼí Faith and author. She learned the Esperanto language and moved to Japan. He had sons William Douglas Alexander (1861–1936), Arthur Chambers Alexander (1863–1954), and Henry Edward Mansfield Alexander (June 10, 1868—August 22, 1900). William Douglas (sometimes called W.D. Alexander Jr.), was in San Francisco during the 1906 San Francisco earthquake. He survived with only a few important papers stuffed in his coat. Arthur became a professor of Physics at the University of California, Berkeley and authored his own textbook.

== Works ==
- William DeWitt Alexander (1891) [1864]. A short synopsis of the most essential points in Hawaiian grammar. Press Publishing Company Print.
- William DeWitt Alexander (1891). A brief history of the Hawaiian people. American Book Co. ISBN 978-1-142-04130-4.
- William DeWitt Alexander (1896). History of later years of the Hawaiian Monarchy and the revolution of 1893. Hawaiian Gazette Company.
- William DeWitt Alexander (1900). Hawaiian Society Sons of the American Revolution yearbook. Hawaiian Gazette Company.
- William DeWitt Alexander (1902). Hawaiian geographic names. United States Coast and Geodetic Survey.
- William DeWitt Alexander (1907). Oahu college: list of trustees, presidents, instructors, matrons, librarians, superintendents of grounds and students, 1841-1906. Historical sketch of Oahu college. Hawaiian Gazette Company.
- "Papers by "Alexander, W. D. (William De Witt), 1833-1913"". Hawaiian Historical Society.

== Family tree ==
Alexander & Baldwin family tree

William P. Alexander (1805–1884)	Mary Ann McKinney (1810–1888)	Amos Starr Cooke (1810–1871)	Juliette Montague (1812–1896)	Dwight Baldwin (1798–1886)	Charlotte Fowler (1805–1873)	J. W. Smith (1810–1887
David Dwight Baldwin (1831–1912)	W. O. Smith (1848–1929)
William D. Alexander (1833–1913)	Abigail Baldwin (1847–1912)	Samuel T. Alexander (1836–1904)	Martha Eliza Cooke	Ann Elizabeth Alexander (1843–1940)	Henry P. Baldwin (1842–1911)	Emily Whitney Alexander (1846–1943)
Agnes Alexander (1875–1971)	Annie Montague Alexander (1867–1950)	C.W. Dickey (1871–1942)	Belle Dickey (1880–1972)	James Dole (1877–1958)	Henry Alexander Baldwin (1871–1946)	Ethel Frances Smith (1879–1967)
J. Walter Cameron (1895–1976)	Francis Baldwin (1904–1996)
Colin C. Cameron (1927–1992) (Kapalua)
