= Haʻikū Mill =

- U.S. National Register of Historic Places
- Hawaiʻi Register of Historic Places
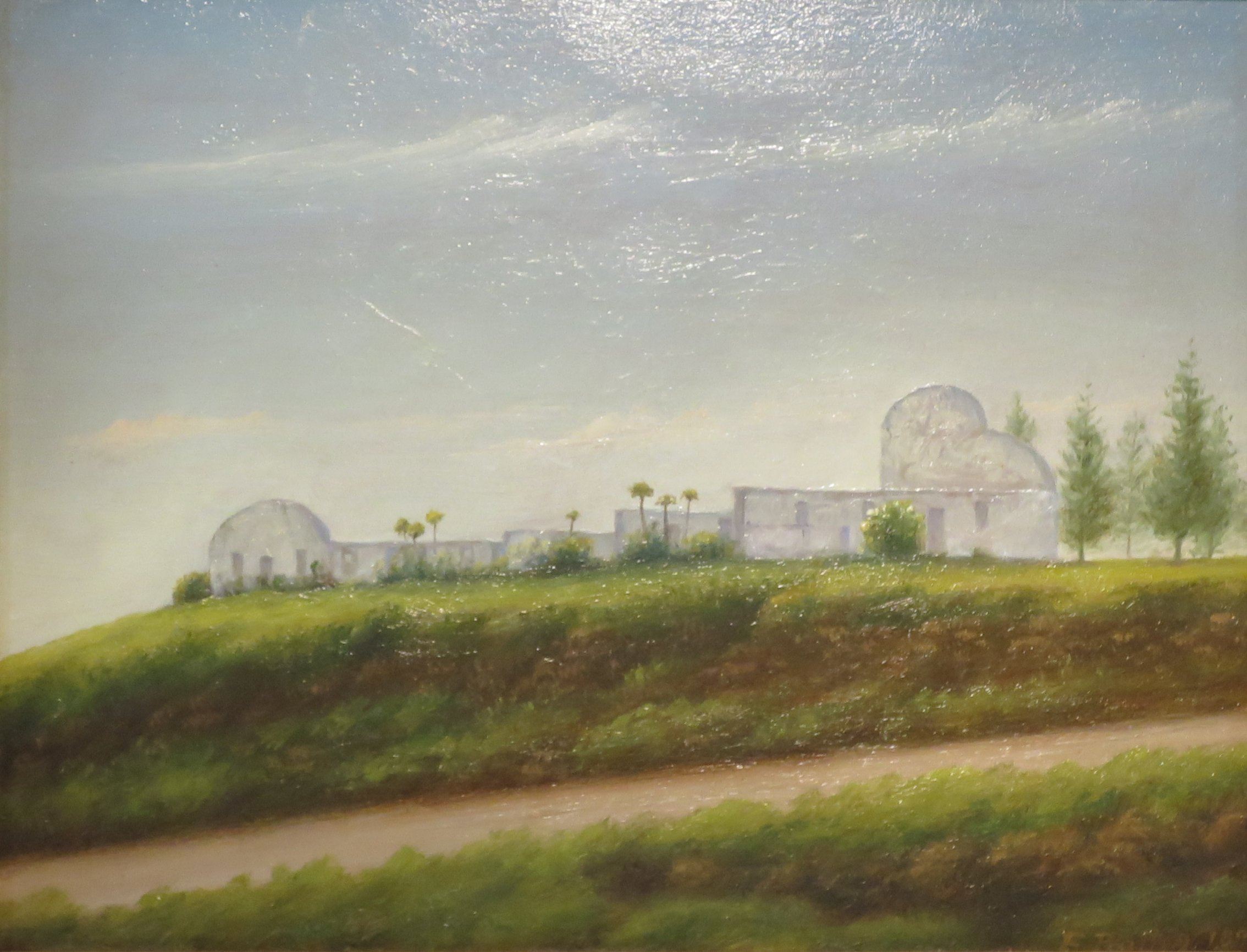
- Haʻikū Mill in Maui, Hawaii (1895 painting)

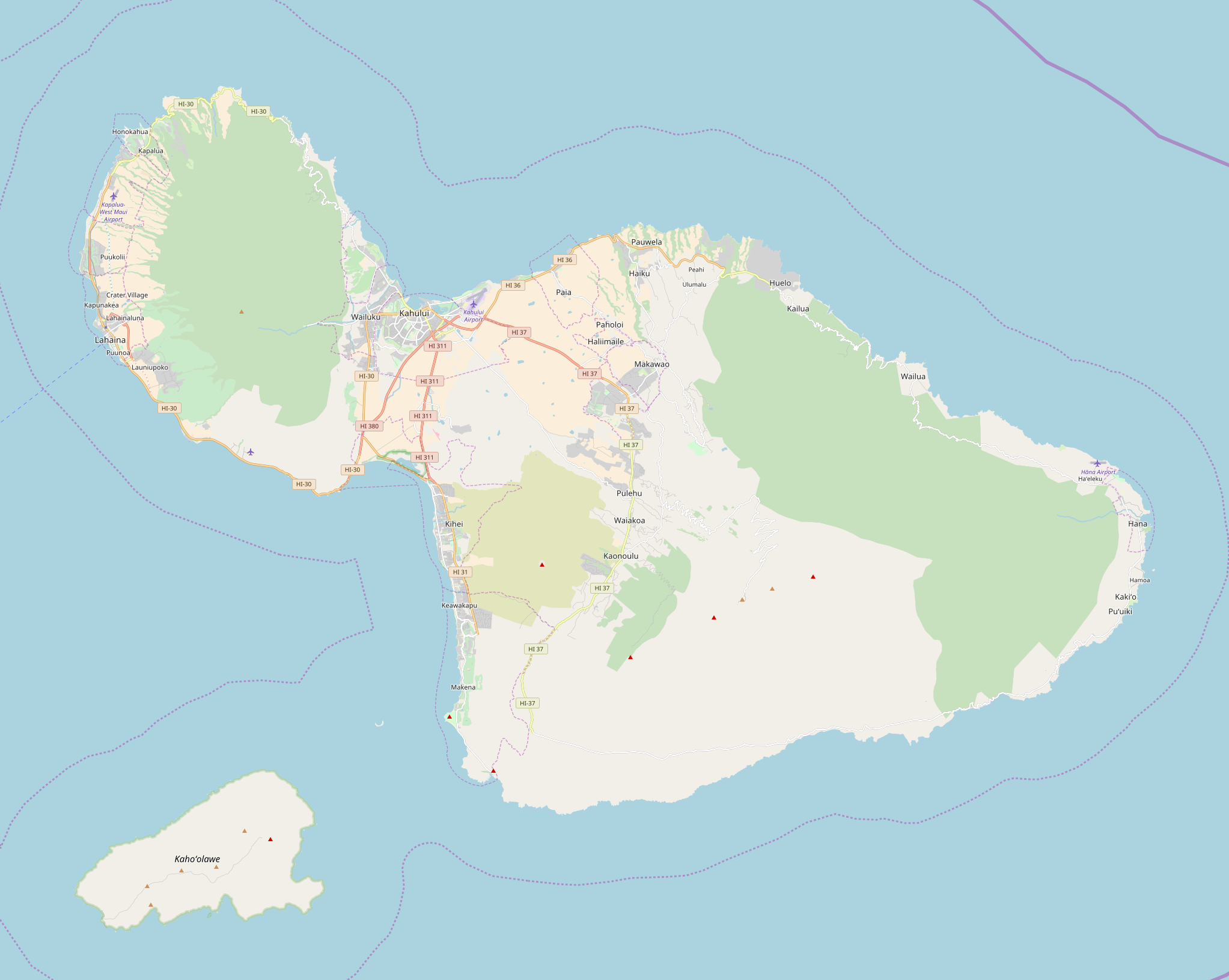
- Location within Maui Location within Hawaii
- Location: 250 Haiku Road, Haʻikū, Maui, Hawaii
- Coordinates: 20°55′32″N 156°19′44″W
- Area: 1.9 acres (0.77 ha)
- Built: 1861
- Architect: D.M. Weston
- NRHP reference No.: 86000189
- HRHP No.: 50-50-06-01622

Significant dates
- Added to NRHP: February 6, 1986
- Designated HRHP: February 6, 1986

The Haʻikū Sugar Mill was a processing factory for sugarcane from 1861 to 1879 on the island of Maui in Hawaii.

== History ==
The northeastern coast of Maui has a small village named Haʻi kū which literally means "sharp break" in the Hawaiian language.

The Haiku Sugar Company was chartered on November 20, 1858 by the Kingdom of Hawaii. It was one of the first ten companies to go into the sugar business in the Hawaiian Islands. The investors, the Castle & Cooke partnership, contracted with Isaac Adams of Boston and D. M. Weston for a milling machine and boiling house with total cost of US$12,000. The first crop was processed in December 1861. In 1871 Samuel T. Alexander became manager of the mill. He formed Alexander & Baldwin with his partner Henry Perrine Baldwin, and organized an irrigation system from 1876 to 1878 that allowed more steady crops to be grown in more leeward areas of the island. As a result, Haiku Mill was abandoned in 1879.

In 1881 Kahului railroad allowed cane to be carried to larger mills near the town of Kahului. In 1905 the Haiku plantation merged with another to become Maui Agricultural Company, and later became the Hawaiian Commercial and Sugar Company division of Alexander & Baldwin with one remaining mill at Puʻunene. The Haʻikū area later became a pineapple plantation. The former cannery at 810 Haiku Road is now a shopping center called the Haiku Marketplace.

Only the walls of the mill were left standing when it was added to the National Register of Historic Places on February 6, 1986 as site 86000189, listed as "Haiku Mill". It is state historic site 50-046-1622.

The mill was purchased and restored by Sylvia Hamilton-Kerr and as of 2016 was open for tourism.

== See also ==
- Sugar plantations in Hawaii
