= William Patterson Alexander =

American missionary

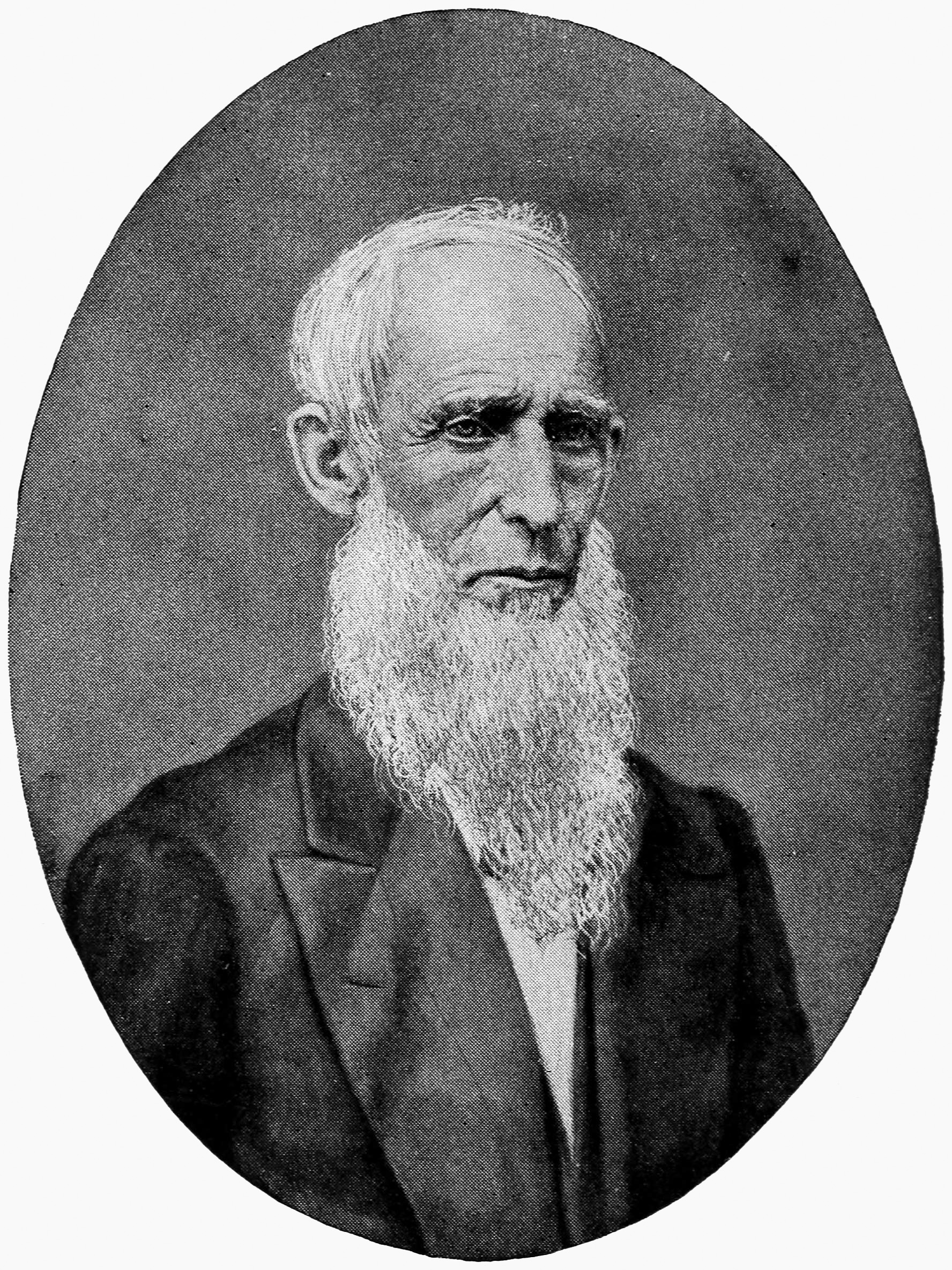
- Born: July 25, 1805; Paris, Kentucky
- Died: August 13, 1884 (aged 79); Oakland, California
- Occupation: Missionary
- Spouse: Mary Ann McKinney
- Children: William DeWitt Alexander; Samuel Thomas Alexander; Anne Alexander Dickey; Emily Whitney Alexander; James McKinney Alexander + 4 others

William Patterson Alexander (July 25, 1805 – August 13, 1884) was an American missionary to the Kingdom of Hawaii. His family continued to influence the history of Hawaii.

== Life ==
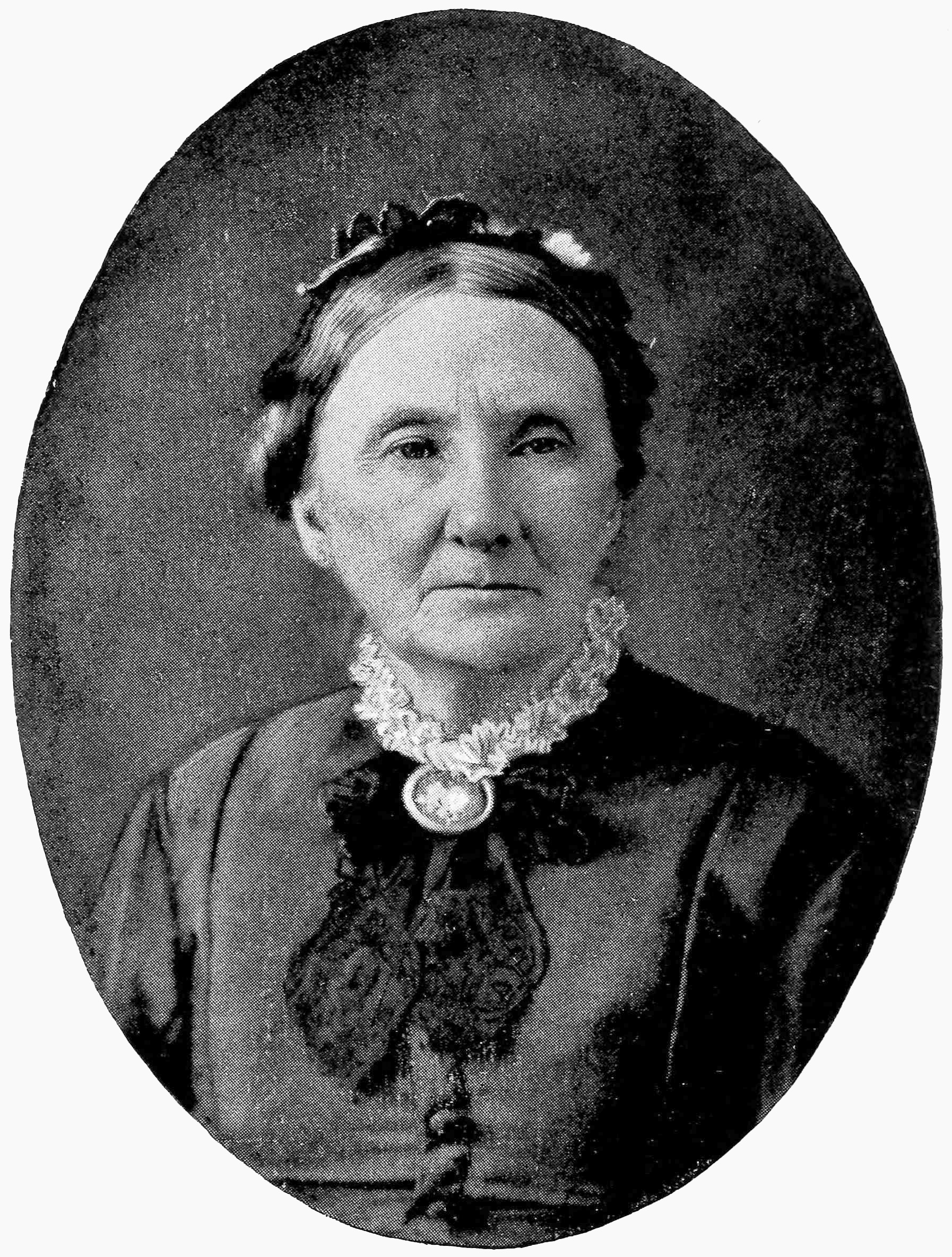
Mary Alexander

William Patterson Alexander was born in Paris, Kentucky on July 25, 1805. His father was James Alexander (1770–1821) and mother was Mary Rose Depuy (1765–1841). He attended Centre College in Danville, Kentucky and then Princeton Theological Seminary. He was a distant cousin of Archibald Alexander, the founder of the Presbyterian seminary. On October 25, 1831, he married Mary Ann McKinney, who was born January 5, 1810, in Harrisburg, Pennsylvania. He was ordained October 13, 1831. They sailed on the Whaleship Averick, under Captain Swain, from New Bedford, Massachusetts, November 26, 1831, and arrived at Honolulu, May 17, 1832. Alexanders and the rest of the fifth company from the American Board of Commissioners for Foreign Missions arrived in April 1832 to the Hawaiian Islands.

They were sent on a scouting mission to the Marquesas Islands (at the time called "Washington Islands") with Reuben Tinker and Samuel Whitney. On July 2, 1833, they then traveled back to establish a Marquesas mission with Richard Armstrong, Benjamin W. Parker with their wives via Tahiti. However, they abandoned the Marquesas to European missionaries and arrived back in Honolulu on May 12, 1834.

The Alexanders were assigned to the mission at Waiʻoli 1834 until 1843. Looking for a drier climate, they were transferred to Lahainaluna School in 1843. After the departure of founder Lorrin Andrews and death of Sheldon Dibble, he became principal until 1856. He preferred to live at cooler, higher elevations, and often camped at what would become ʻUlupalakua Ranch. Although the American Board was withdrawing support, he continued to assist efforts such as the Kaʻahumanu Church in Wailuku, Hawaii from November 1856 until 1882. He and his wife traveled back to New Bedford by April 1858 on a fund-raising trip, and returned by December 1859. He helped unite Presbyterian and Congregational churches into the Hawaiian Evangelical Association. He died August 13, 1884, in Oakland, California, and was buried in the Mountain View Cemetery.

The Alexanders had 9 children:

1. William DeWitt Alexander (1833–1913) married Abigail Charlotte Baldwin (1833–1913) in 1861.
2. James McKinney Alexander was born January 29, 1835. He graduated from Williams College and Princeton Theological Seminary and died in 1911.
3. Samuel Thomas Alexander was born October 29, 1836, married Martha Eliza Cooke, daughter of Amos Starr Cooke, co-founder of Castle & Cooke on January 26, 1864. Samuel was a co-founder of Alexander & Baldwin who died September 10, 1904.
4. Henry Martyn Alexander (1839–1910) married Eliza Yates Wight and then Ina B. Weist.
5. Mary Jane Alexander (1840–1913) of which not much is known.
6. Anne Elizabeth Alexander (1843–1940) married Charles Henry Dickey. Their son was architect Charles William Dickey, and daughter Belle Dickey married Pineapple planter James Drummond Dole.
7. Emily Whitney Alexander (1846–1943) married Henry Perrine Baldwin (co-founder of Alexander & Baldwin) in 1869.
8. Charles Hodge Alexander (1848–1885) married Helen Goodale Thurston (1860–1885), granddaughter of missionaries Asa Thurston, Lucy Goodale Thurston, and Lorrin Andrews, and sister of Lorrin Andrews Thurston.
9. Ellen Charlotte Alexander (1852–1924) married Giulio Ferreri and moved to Italy.

The Baldwins were children of fellow missionary Dwight Baldwin.

Mary Ann McKinney Alexander moved back to Maui and lived with family, where she died on June 29, 1888.

A street was named for him in Honolulu at 21°18′4″N 157°49′47″W.

== Family tree ==
Alexander & Baldwin family tree

William P. Alexander (1805–1884)	Mary Ann McKinney (1810–1888)	Amos Starr Cooke (1810–1871)	Juliette Montague (1812–1896)	Dwight Baldwin (1798–1886)	Charlotte Fowler (1805–1873)	J. W. Smith (1810–1887
David Dwight Baldwin (1831–1912)	W. O. Smith (1848–1929)
William D. Alexander (1833–1913)	Abigail Baldwin (1847–1912)	Samuel T. Alexander (1836–1904)	Martha Eliza Cooke	Ann Elizabeth Alexander (1843–1940)	Henry P. Baldwin (1842–1911)	Emily Whitney Alexander (1846–1943)
Agnes Alexander (1875–1971)	Annie Montague Alexander (1867–1950)	C.W. Dickey (1871–1942)	Belle Dickey (1880–1972)	James Dole (1877–1958)	Henry Alexander Baldwin (1871–1946)	Ethel Frances Smith (1879–1967)
J. Walter Cameron (1895–1976)	Francis Baldwin (1904–1996)
Colin C. Cameron (1927–1992) (Kapalua)
