= Victoria Falls =

Waterfall on the Zambezi River in Zambia and Zimbabwe

- Mosi-oa-Tunya; Shungu Namutitima
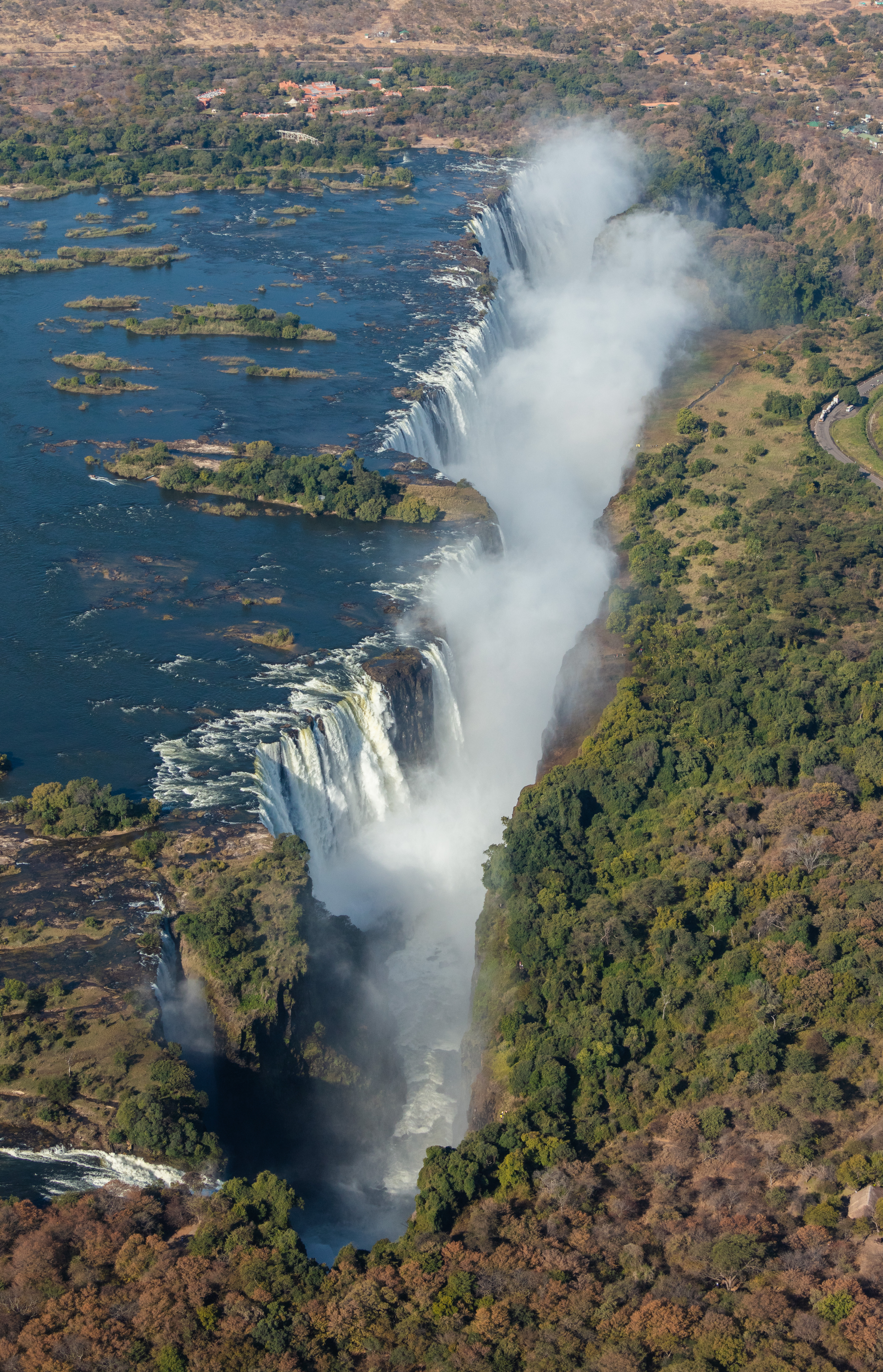

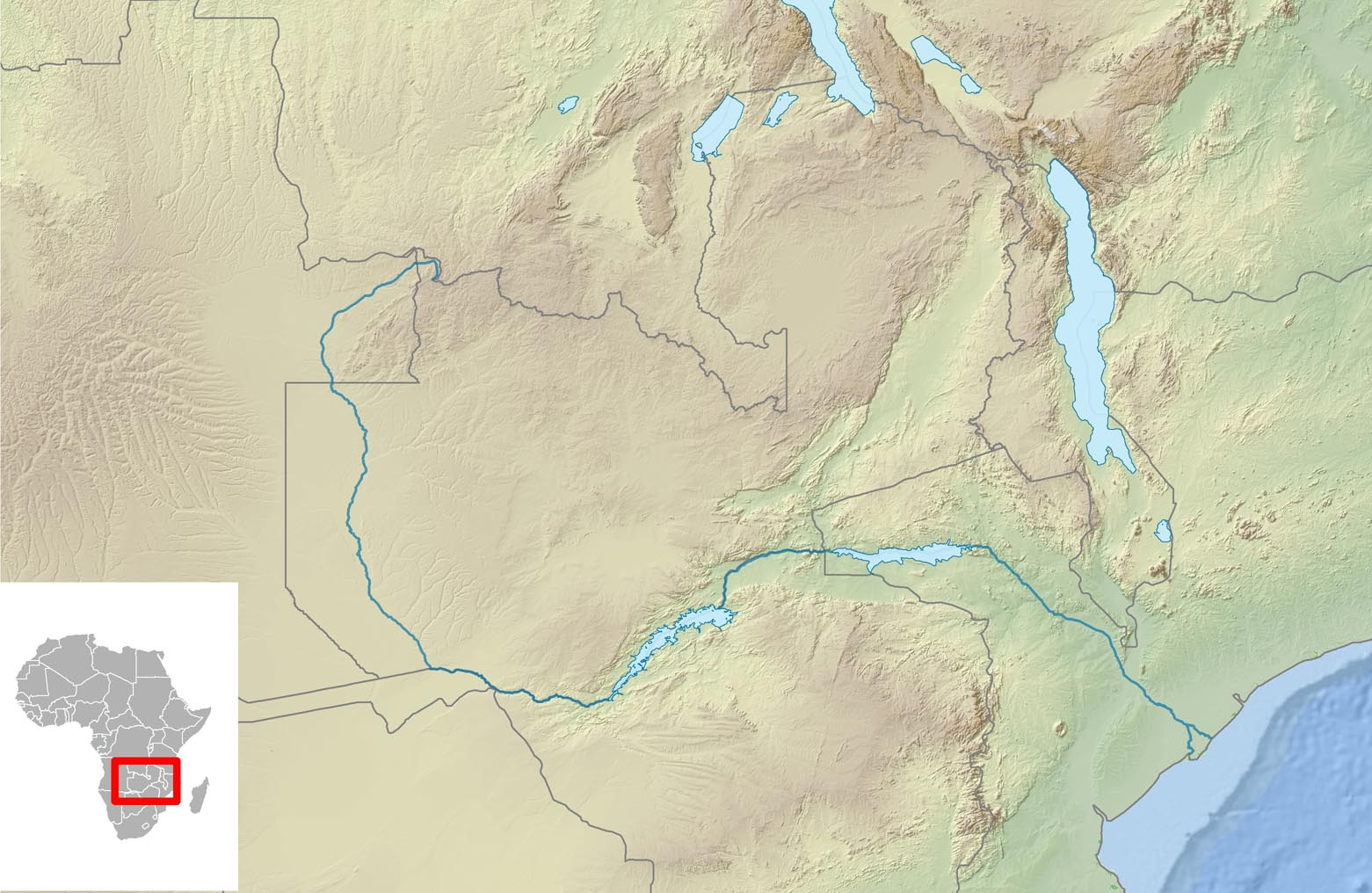
- Location within Zambezi River
- Coordinates: 17°55′28″S 25°51′24″E
- Type: Cataract waterfall
- Total height: 108 m (355 ft)
- Number of drops: 1
- Watercourse: Zambezi River
- Average flow rate: 1,088 m^{3}/s (38,400 cu ft/s)

UNESCO World Heritage Site
- Official name: Mosi-oa-Tunya / Victoria Falls
- Type: Natural
- Criteria: vii, viii
- Designated: 1989 (13th session)
- Reference no.: 509
- Region: List of World Heritage Sites in Africa

Victoria Falls (Lozi: Mosi-oa-Tunya, "Thundering Smoke/Smoke that Rises"; Tonga: Shungu Namutitima, "Boiling Water") is a waterfall on the Zambezi River, located on the border between Zambia and Zimbabwe. It is one of the world's largest waterfalls, with a width of 1,708 m (5,604 ft). The region around it has a high degree of biodiversity in both plants and animals.

Archaeology and oral history describe a long record of African knowledge of the site. Although known to some European geographers before the 19th century, Scottish missionary David Livingstone was introduced to the falls in 1855, naming them Victoria Falls after Queen Victoria. Since the mid-20th century, the site has been a major tourist destination. Zambia and Zimbabwe both have national parks and tourism infrastructure at the site. Research in the late 2010s found that precipitation variability due to climate change is likely to alter the character of the falls.

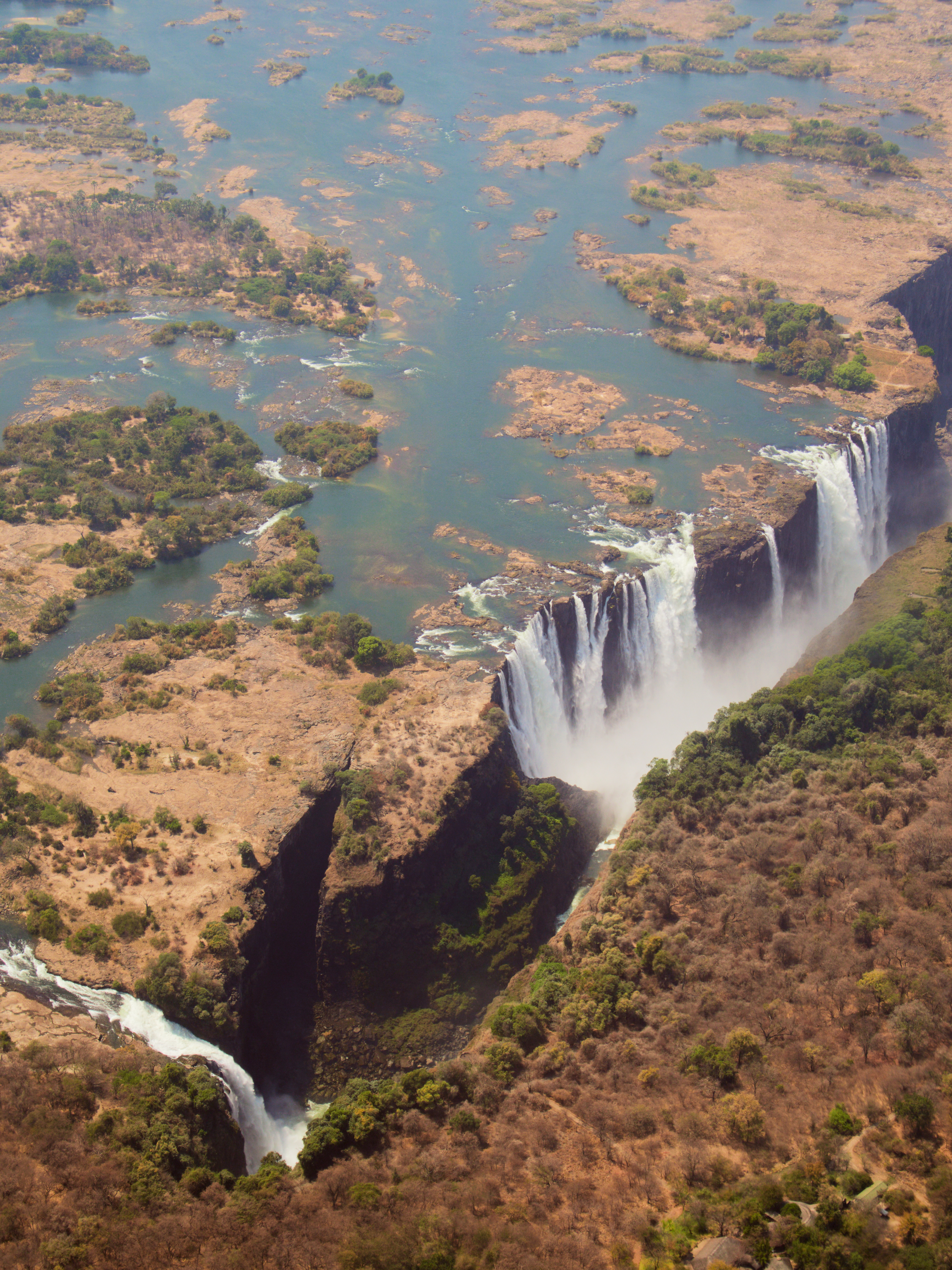
Aerial view of Victoria Falls on the Zambezi River, in Spring.

== Name origins ==
David Livingstone was the first European recorded to have viewed the falls on 16 November 1855, from an island now known as Livingstone Island, one of two land masses in the middle of the river, immediately upstream from the falls near the Zambian shore. Livingstone named his sighting in honour of Queen Victoria, but the Lozi language name Mosi-oa-Tunya, meaning "the smoke that thunders", continues in common usage. Both names are recognised in the World Heritage List. Livingstone also referred to the older names Seongo and Chongwe, which mean "the place of the rainbow".

The nearby national park in Zambia is named Mosi-oa-Tunya, whereas the national park and town on the Zimbabwean shore are both named Victoria Falls.

== Size ==
Victoria Falls is classified as the largest based on its combined width of 1,708 metres (5,604 ft) and height of 108 metres (354 ft), resulting in the world's largest sheet of falling water.

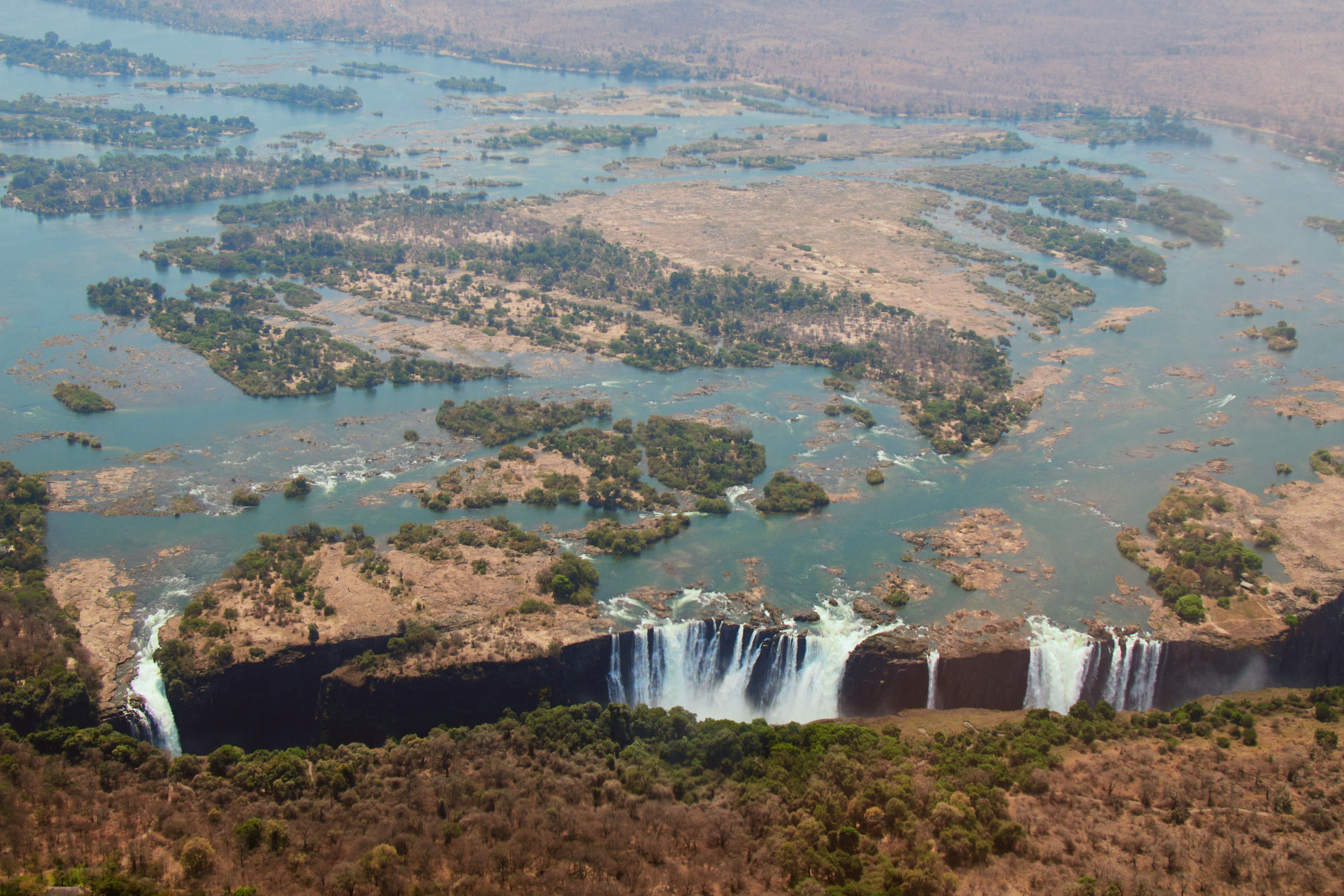
Aerial view of Victoria Falls on the Zambezi River, showing the full width of the falls and the braided river channels and islands upstream. Spring 2024.

For a considerable distance upstream from the falls, the Zambezi flows over a level sheet of basalt in a shallow valley, bounded by low and distant sandstone hills. The river's course is dotted with numerous tree-covered islands, which increase in number as the river approaches the falls. There is a flat plateau extending in all directions.

The falls were formed where the full width of the river plummets in a single vertical drop into a transverse chasm 1,708 metres (5,604 ft) wide, along a fracture zone in the basalt plateau. The depth of the chasm, called the First Gorge, varies from 80 metres (260 ft) at its western end to 108 metres (354 ft) in the centre. The only outlet from the First Gorge is a 110-metre-wide (360 ft) gap about two-thirds of the way across the width of the falls from the western end. The whole volume of the river pours into the Victoria Falls gorges from this narrow cleft.

Two islands are situated on the crest of the falls: Boaruka Island (or Cataract Island) near the western bank, and Livingstone Island near the middle. At less than full flood, additional islets divide the curtain of water into separate parallel streams. The main streams are named, in order from Zimbabwe (west) to Zambia (east): the Devil's Cataract (called Leaping Water by some), the Main Falls, the Rainbow Falls (the highest) and the Eastern Cataract.

Victoria Falls seen from Zimbabwe in August, 2019.

The River Zambezi, upstream from the falls, experiences a rainy season from late November to early April, and a dry season the rest of the year. The river's annual flood season is February to May with a peak in April. The spray from the falls typically rises to a height of over 400 metres (1,300 ft), sometimes up to twice as high, and is visible from up to 50 km (30 mi) away. At full moon, a "moonbow" can also be seen. During the flood season, however, the foot and the face of the waterfall can not be seen.

When the dry season takes effect, the islets on the crest become wider and more numerous. From September to January, up to half of the rocky face of the falls may become dry, allowing the bottom of the First Gorge to be seen along most of its length. At this time, it becomes possible (though not necessarily safe) to walk across some stretches of the river at the crest. It is also possible to walk to the bottom of the First Gorge at the Zimbabwean side. The minimum flow, which occurs in November, is around a tenth of the April figure; this variation in flow is greater than that of other major falls and causes the Victoria Falls' annual average flow rate to be lower than might be expected based on the maximum flow. In 2019 unusually low rain dramatically reduced the fall to the lowest flow in a century. Global climate change and changed climate patterns are suggested to have caused this.

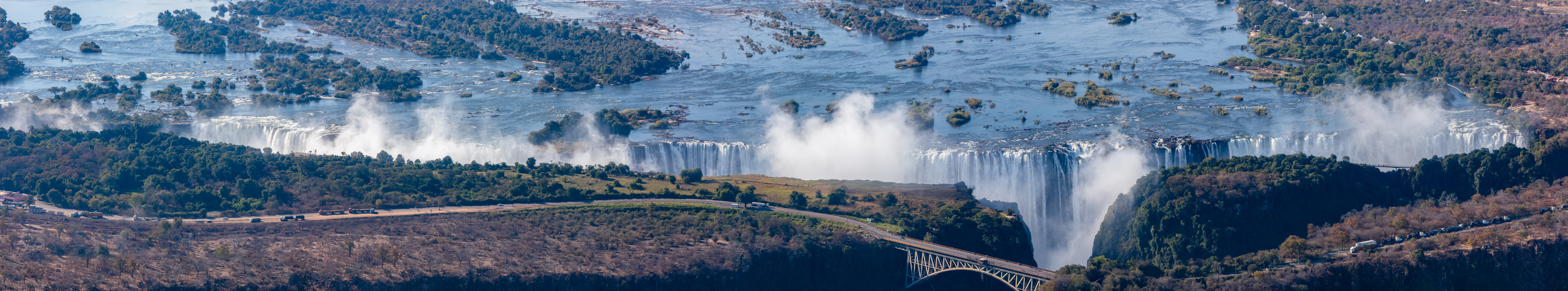
Panorama of the Victoria Falls

== Gorges ==
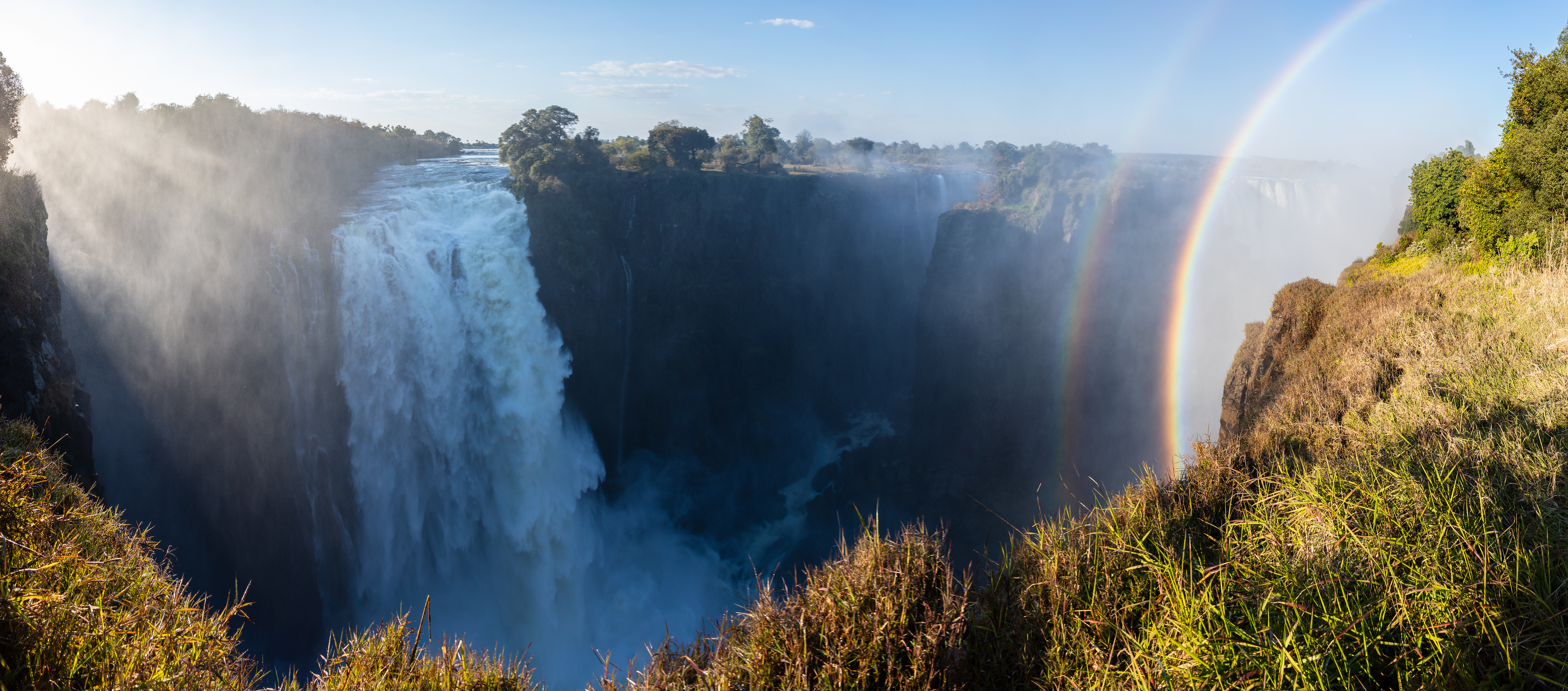
First Gorge, from the Zambian side

The entire volume of the Zambezi River pours through the First Gorge's 110 m (360 ft) wide exit for a distance of about 150 m (490 ft), then enters a zigzagging series of gorges designated by the order in which the river reaches them. Water entering the Second Gorge makes a sharp right turn and has carved out a deep pool there called the Boiling Pot. Reached via a steep footpath from the Zambian side, it is about 150 m (490 ft) across. Its surface is smooth at low water, but at high water is marked by enormous, slow swirls and heavy turbulence.

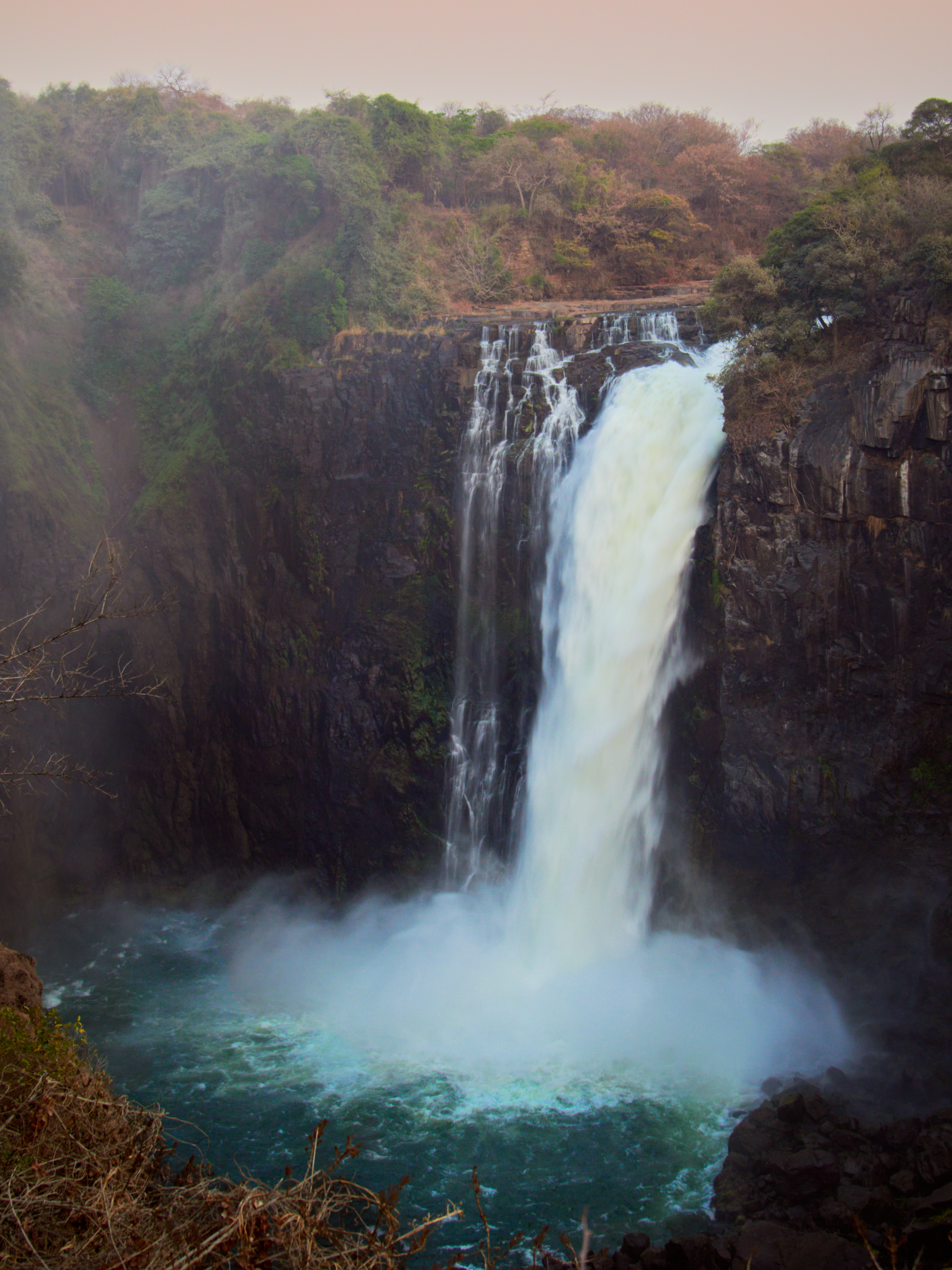
Devil's Cataract

The principal gorges are

- First Gorge: the one the river falls into at Victoria Falls
- Second Gorge: 250 m (820 ft) south of falls, 2.15 km (1.34 mi) long, spanned by the Victoria Falls Bridge
- Third Gorge: 600 m (2,000 ft) south, 1.95 km (1.21 mi) long, containing the Victoria Falls Power Station
- Fourth Gorge: 1.15 km (0.71 mi) south, 2.25 km (1.40 mi) long
- Fifth Gorge: 2.25 km (1.40 mi) south, 3.2 km (2.0 mi) long
- Songwe Gorge: 5.3 km (3.3 mi) south, 3.3 km (2.1 mi) long named after the small Songwe River coming from the north-east, and the deepest at 140 m (460 ft), the level of the river in them varies by up to 20 m (66 ft) between wet and dry seasons.

== Formation ==
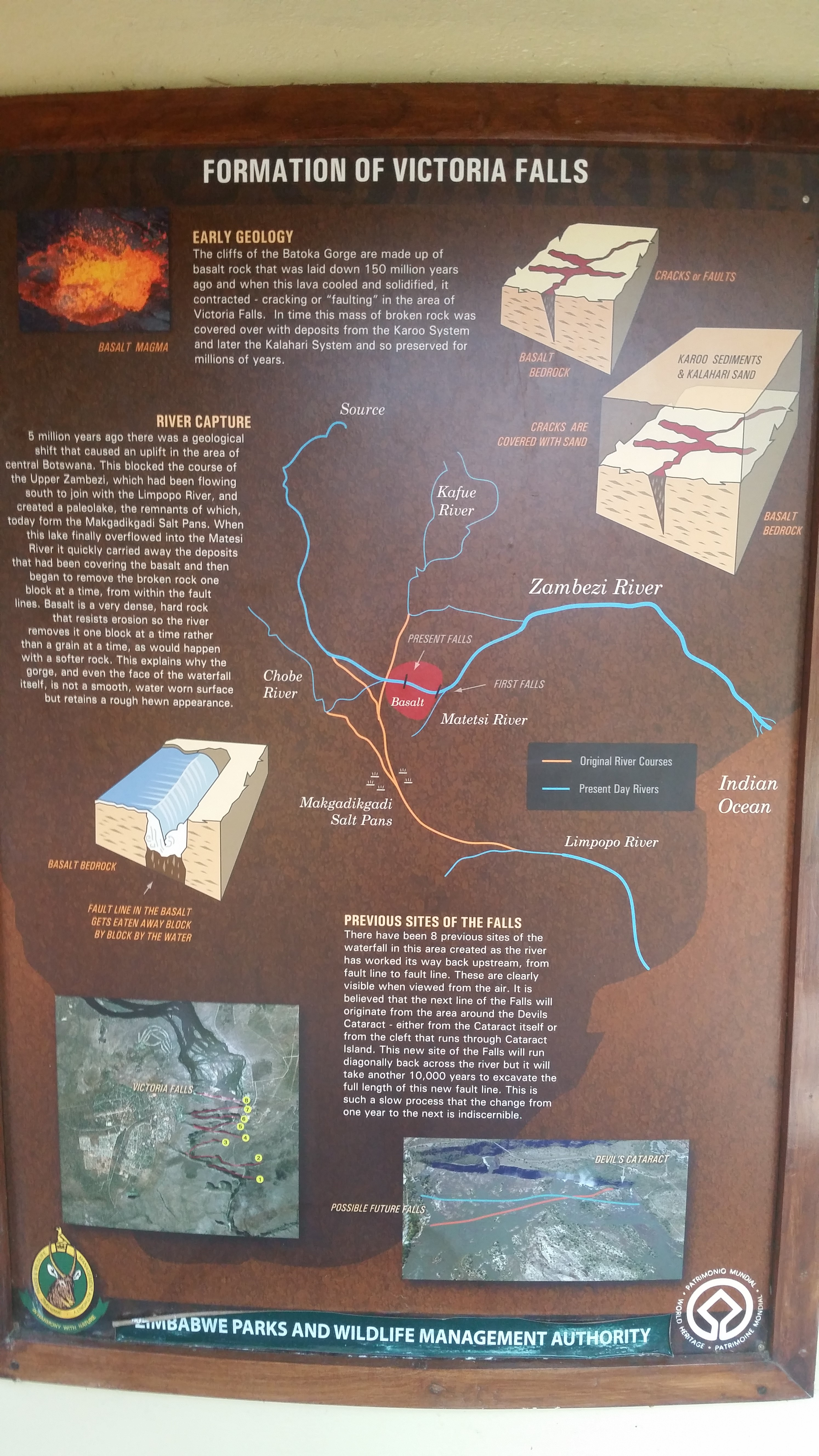
Victoria Falls National Park marker

The Upper Zambezi River originally drained south through present day Botswana to join the Limpopo River. A general uplift of the land between Zimbabwe and the Kalahari Desert about 2 million years ago blocked this drainage route, and a large paleolake known as Lake Makgadikgadi formed between the Kalahari and the Batoka Basaltic Plateau of Zimbabwe and Zambia. This lake was originally endorheic and had no natural outlet. Under wetter climate conditions about 20,000 years BP, it eventually overflowed and began to drain to the east, cutting the Batoka Gorge through the basalt.

The recent geological history of Victoria Falls can be seen in the overall form of the Batoka Gorge, with its six individual gorges and eight past positions of the falls. The east–west oriented gorges imply structural control with alignment along joints of shatter zones, or faults with 50 metres (160 ft) of vertical displacement as is the case of the second and fifth gorges. Headward erosion along these structural lines of weakness would establish a new fall line and abandonment of the earlier line. North-south oriented joints control the south flowing sections of the river. One of these is the "Boiling Pot", which links the First Gorge with the Second Gorge.

The falls may have already started cutting back the next major gorge, at the dip in one side of the "Devil's Cataract", between the western river bank and Cataract Island. The lip in the current falls is lowest here and carries the greatest concentration of water at flood stage.

The sedimentary sequence overlying the basalt at the Zambezi River margins is called the Victoria Falls Formation, which consists of gravel, the Pipe sandstone, Kalahari sand, aeolian sand and alluvium. A 15–45 m scarp bounds the river about 5–6 km from the main channel, and a series of river terraces are evident between the scarp and the channel.

== History ==
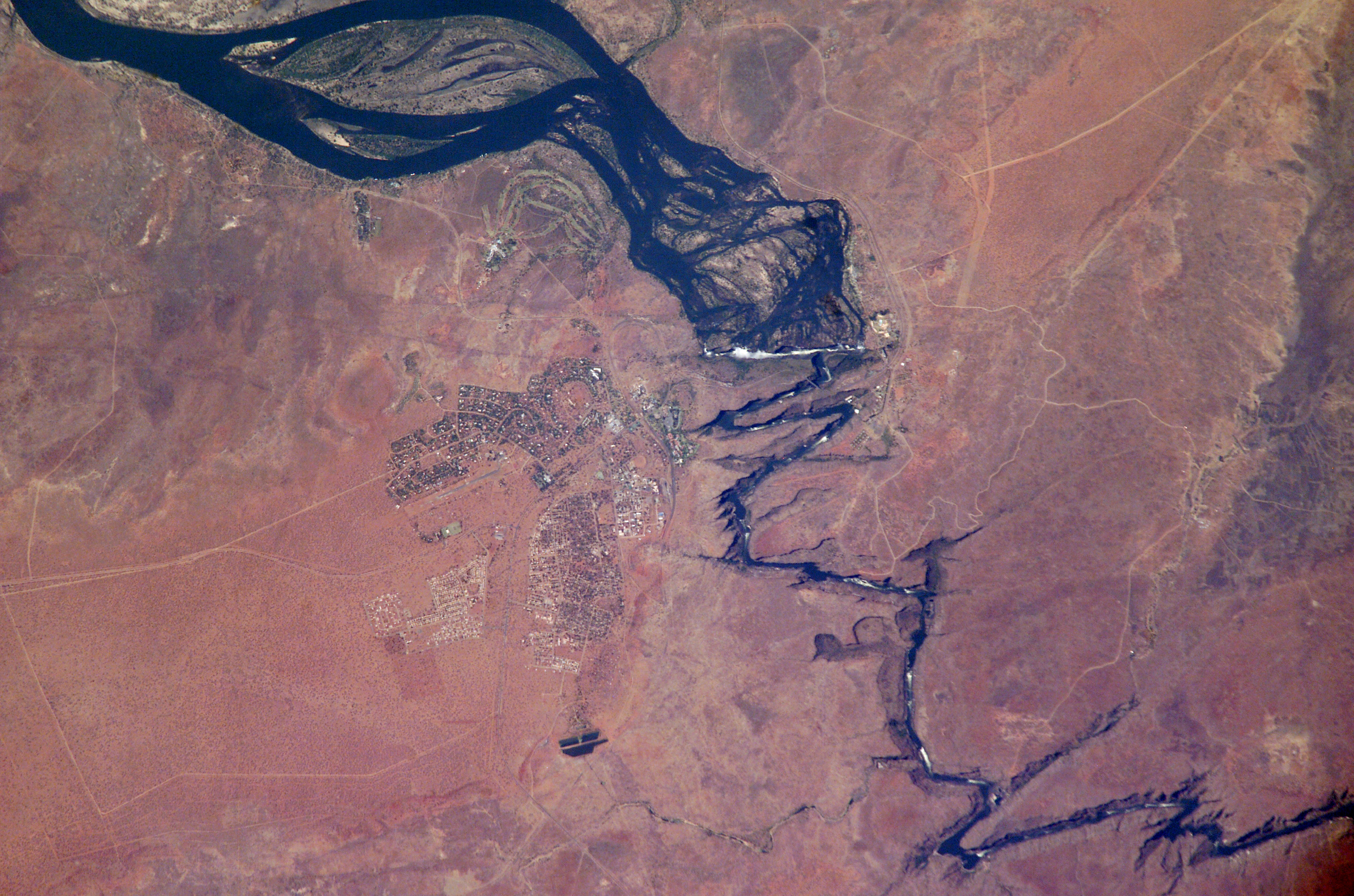
Satellite image showing the broad Zambezi falling into the narrow cleft and subsequent series of zigzagging gorges

=== Geological history ===
The basalt plateau of Victoria Falls, over which the Zambezi River flows, was formed during the Jurassic period, around 200 million years ago.

=== Pre-colonial history ===
Early Stone Age Acheulean stone artefacts and Oldowan tools were excavated at archaeological sites around the falls, as well as Sangoan tools and Lupemban artefacts dating to the Middle Stone Age. Early Iron Age pottery was excavated at a vlei site near Masuma Dam in the early 1960s. Evidence for iron smelting was also found in a settlement dating to the late first millennium AD.

The southern Tonga people known as the Batoka/Tokalea called the falls Shungu na mutitima. The Matabele, later arrivals, named them aManz' aThunqayo, and the Batswana and Makololo (whose language is used by the Lozi people) call them Mosi-o-Tunya. All these names mean essentially "the smoke that thunders".

A map drawn by Nicolas de Fer in 1715 shows the fall clearly marked in the correct position. It also shows dotted lines denoting trade routes that David Livingstone followed 140 years later. A map from c. 1750 drawn by Jacques Nicolas Bellin for Abbé Antoine François Prevost d'Exiles marks the falls as "cataractes" and notes a settlement to the north of the Zambezi as being friendly with the Portuguese at the time.

=== 19th century ===
In November 1855, David Livingstone was the first European who saw the falls, when he travelled from the upper Zambezi to the mouth of the river between 1852 and 1856. The falls were well known to local tribes, and Voortrekker hunters may have known of them, as may the Arabs under a name equivalent to "the end of the world". Europeans were sceptical of their reports, perhaps thinking that the lack of mountains and valleys on the plateau made a large fall unlikely.

Livingstone had been told about the falls before he reached them from upriver and was paddled across to the Livingstone Island in Zambia.

In 1860, Livingstone returned to the area and made a detailed study of the falls with John Kirk. Other early European visitors included Portuguese explorer Serpa Pinto, Czech explorer Emil Holub, who made the first detailed plan of the falls and its surroundings in 1875 (published in 1880), and British artist Thomas Baines, who executed some of the earliest paintings of the falls. Until the area was opened up by the building of the railway in 1905, though, the falls were seldom visited by other Europeans. Some writers believe that the Portuguese priest Gonçalo da Silveira was the first European to catch sight of the falls back in the sixteenth century.

=== History since 1900 ===
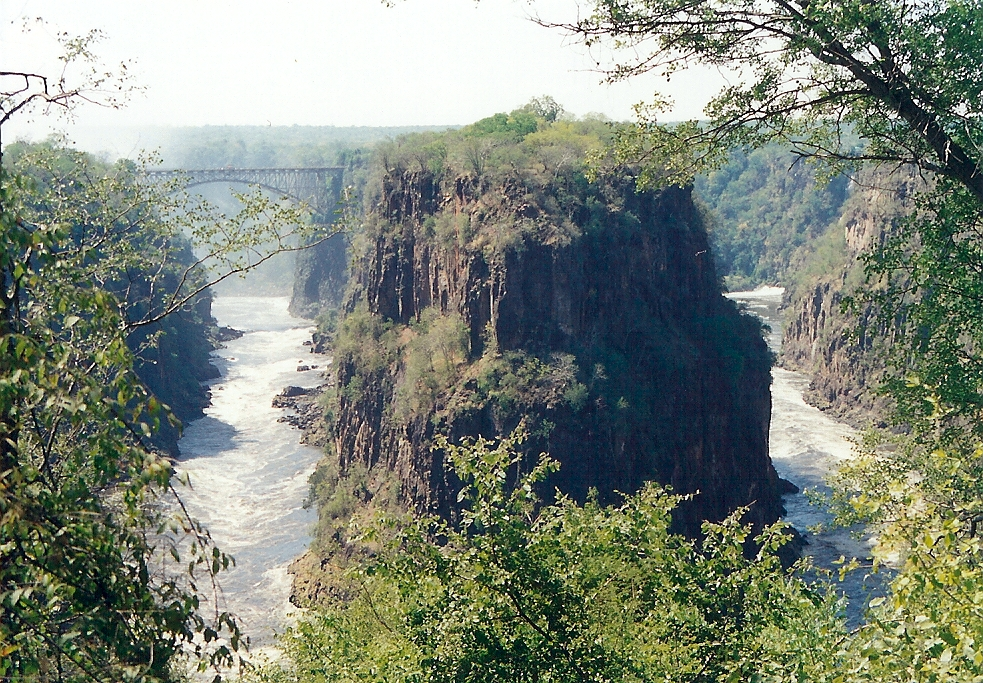
Victoria Falls' Second Gorge (with bridge) and Third Gorge (right). The peninsular cliffs are in Zambia, the outer cliffs in Zimbabwe. The cliffs are composed of Batoka Formation basalt flows. The breaks in slope with vegetation are brecciated amygdaloidal basalt zones separating six successive and massive lava flows with distinct vertical jointing.

==== Victoria Falls Bridge initiates tourism ====
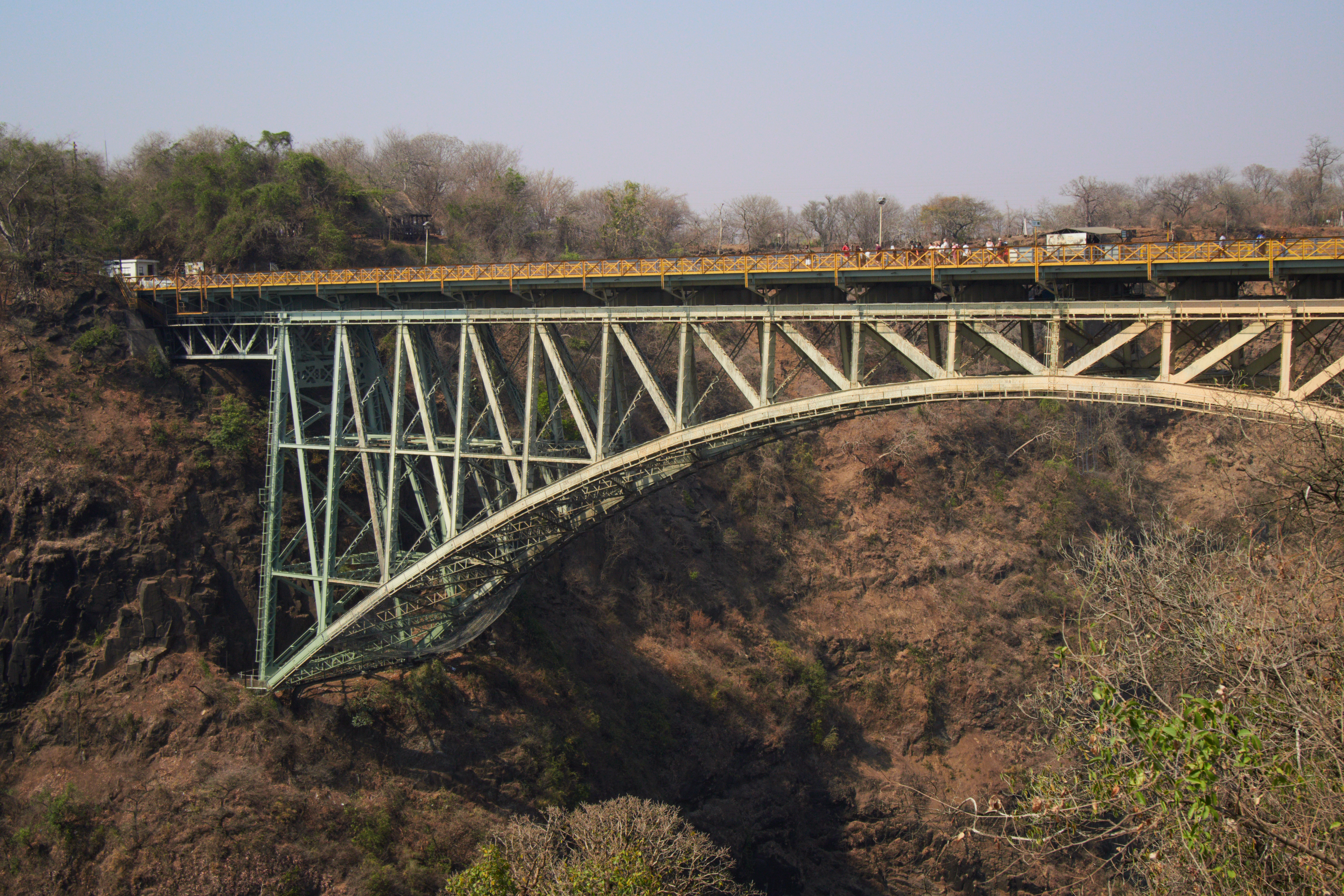
The Victoria Falls Bridge, a steel arch bridge spanning the Batoka Gorge between Zimbabwe and Zambia.

European settlement of the Victoria Falls area started around 1900 in response to the desire of Cecil Rhodes's British South Africa Company for mineral rights and imperial rule north of the Zambezi, and the exploitation of other natural resources such as timber forests north-east of the falls, and ivory and animal skins. Before 1905, the river was crossed above the falls at the Old Drift, by dugout canoe or a barge towed across with a steel cable. Rhodes's vision of a Cape-Cairo railway drove plans for the first bridge across the Zambezi. He insisted it be built where the spray from the falls would fall on passing trains, so the site at the Second Gorge was chosen. (See the main article Victoria Falls Bridge for details.) From 1905 the railway offered accessible travel from as far as the Cape in the south and from 1909, as far as the Belgian Congo in the north. In 1904 the Victoria Falls Hotel was opened to accommodate visitors arriving on the new railway. The falls became an increasingly popular attraction during British colonial rule of Northern Rhodesia (Zambia) and Southern Rhodesia (Zimbabwe), with the town of Victoria Falls becoming the main tourist centre.

==== During independence movements ====
In 1964, Northern Rhodesia became the independent state of Zambia. The following year, Rhodesia unilaterally declared independence. This was not recognised by Zambia, the United Kingdom nor the vast majority of states and led to United Nations-mandated sanctions. In response to the emerging crisis, in 1966 Zambia restricted or stopped border crossings. It did not re-open the border completely until 1980. The Rhodesian Bush War erupted on the southern side of the Zambezi from 1972 to 1980 with terrorist incursions from Zambia, Mozambique and Botswana. Visitor numbers began to drop, particularly on the Rhodesian side. Periodic Rhodesian military cross-border operations against guerrilla camps in Zambia, caused the Zambians to impose security measures including the stationing of soldiers to restrict access to the gorges and some parts of the falls.

Zimbabwe's internationally recognized independence in 1980 brought comparative peace, and the 1980s witnessed renewed levels of tourism and the development of the region as a centre for adventure sports. Activities that gained popularity in the area include whitewater rafting in the gorges, bungee jumping from the bridge, game fishing, horse riding, kayaking, e-biking, and sightseeing flights over the falls.

==== Tourism in recent years ====
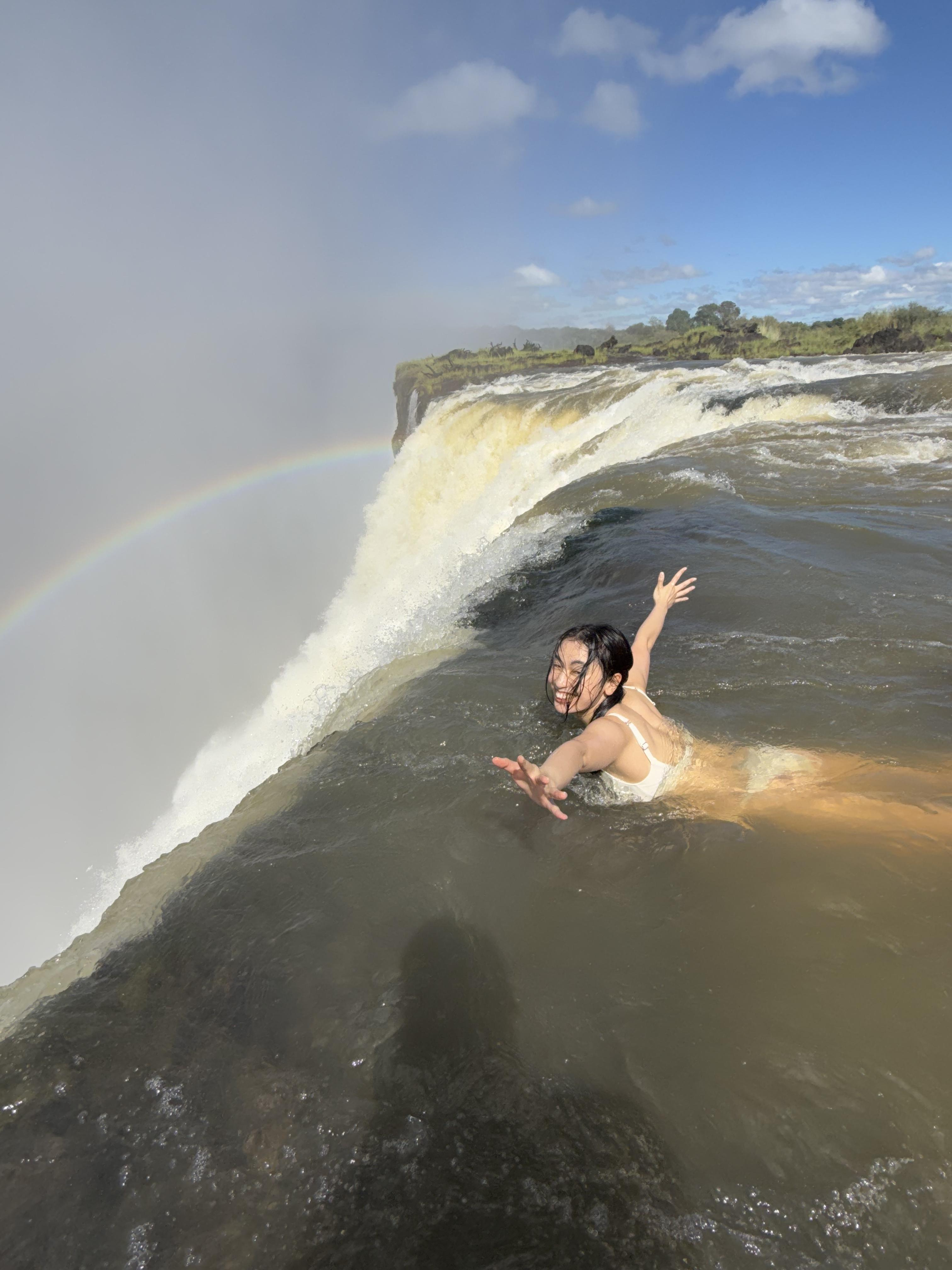
The naturally formed "Devil's Pool", where tourists swim despite a risk of plunging over the edge

By the end of the 1990s, almost 400,000 people were visiting the falls annually, and this was expected to rise to over a million in the next decade. Unlike the game parks, Victoria Falls has more Zimbabwean and Zambian visitors than international tourists; the attraction is accessible by bus and train, and is therefore comparatively inexpensive to reach.

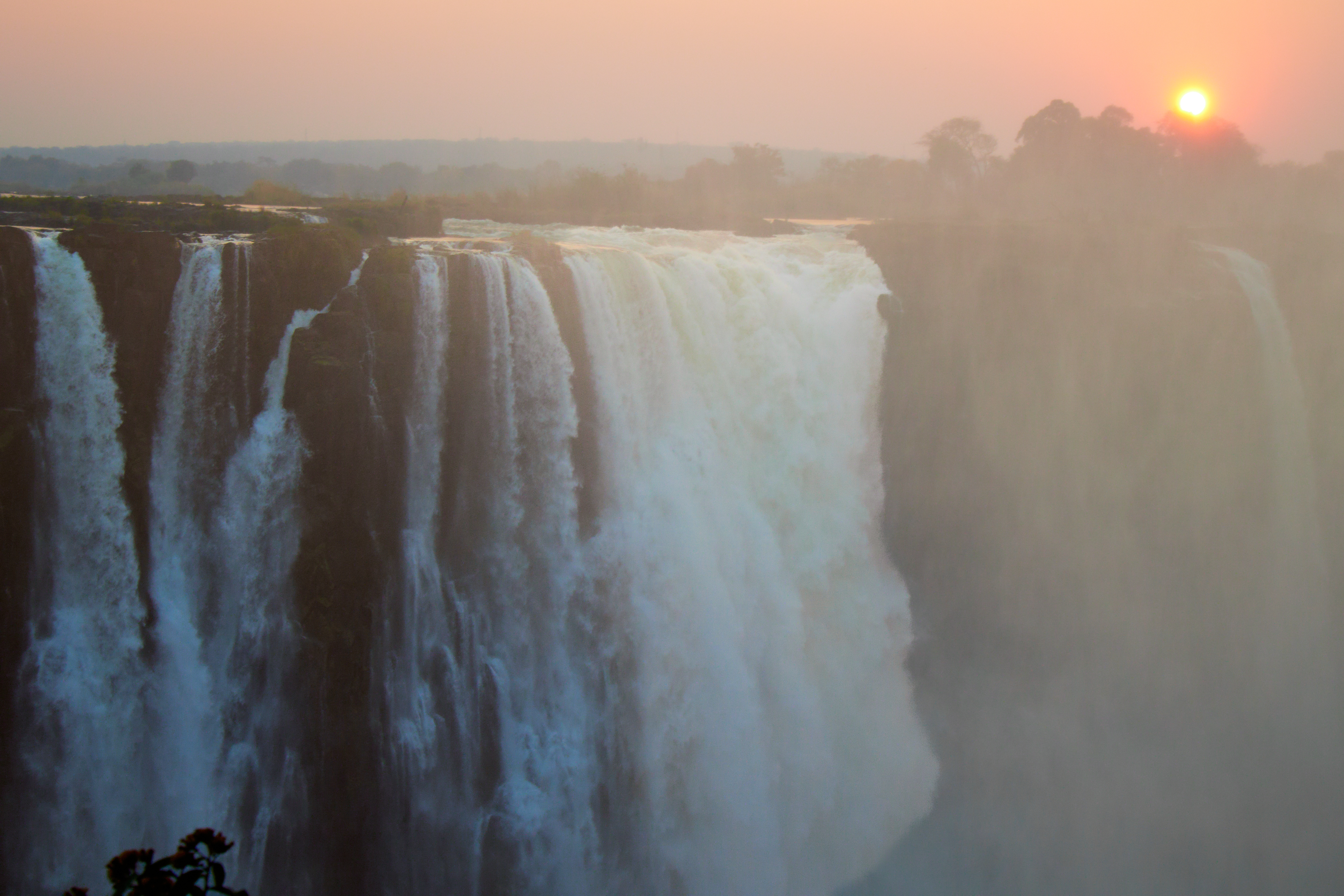
Main Falls, viewed at sunrise with mist rising from the cascades.

The numbers of visitors to the Zimbabwean side of the falls has historically been much higher than the number visiting the Zambian side, due to the greater development of the visitor facilities there. However, the number of tourists visiting Zimbabwe began to decline in the early 2000s as political tensions between supporters and opponents of president Robert Mugabe increased. In 2006, hotel occupancy on the Zimbabwean side hovered at around 30%, while the Zambian side was near capacity, with rates in top hotels reaching US$630 per night. The rapid development has prompted the United Nations to consider revoking the falls' status as a World Heritage Site. In addition, problems of waste disposal and a lack of effective management of the falls' environment are a concern. A famous feature is the naturally formed "Devil's Pool", an infinity pool that sits on the lip of Victoria Falls, on the Zambian side, along the western tip of Livingstone Island. When the river flow is at a certain level, usually between September and December, a rock barrier forms an eddy with minimal current, allowing adventurous swimmers to splash around in relative safety in front of the point where the water cascades over the falls.

== Natural environment ==
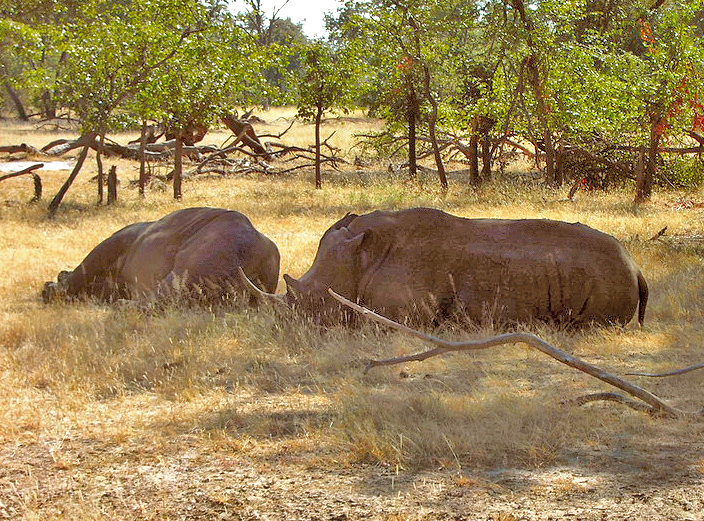
Two white rhinos at Mosi-oa-Tunya national park in May 2005. They are not indigenous, but were imported from South Africa.

=== National parks ===
The two national parks at the falls are relatively small– Mosi-oa-Tunya National Park is 66 km^{2} (25 sq mi) and Victoria Falls National Park is 23 km^{2} (8.9 sq mi). However, next to the latter on the southern bank is the Zambezi National Park, extending 40 km (25 mi) west along the river. Animals can move between the two Zimbabwean parks and can also reach Matetsi Safari Area, Kazuma Pan National Park and Hwange National Park to the south.

On the Zambian side, fences and the outskirts of Livingstone tend to confine most animals to the Mosi-oa-Tunya National Park. In addition fences put up by lodges in response to crime restrict animal movement.

On Botswana’s side of the border, Chobe National Park is a short distance to travel to and is a popular location for a day trip for many tourists visiting Victoria Falls for extended stays. It offers more diverse flora and fauna than Hwange National Park.

In 2004 a separate group of police called the Tourism Police was started. They are commonly seen around the main tourist areas, and can be identified by their uniforms with yellow reflective bibs.

=== Vegetation ===
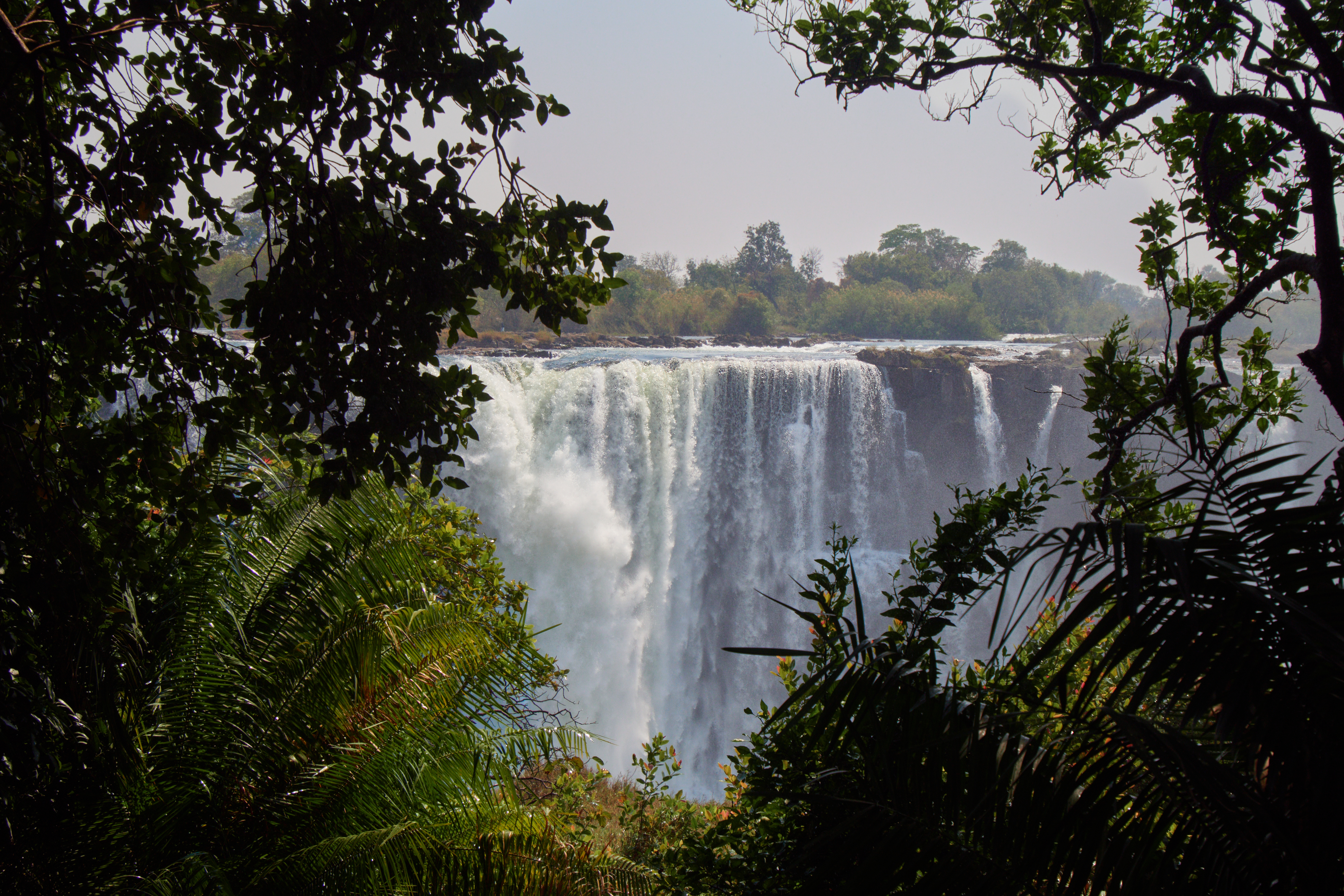
Spray from the falls creates a local rainforest.

Riverine forest with palm trees lines the banks and islands above the falls. The most notable aspect of the area's vegetation though is the rainforest nurtured by the spray from the falls, containing plants rare for the area such as pod mahogany, ebony, ivory palm, wild date palm, batoko plum and creepers and lianas. Outside the riparian zone, mopane woodland savannah predominates in the area, with smaller areas of miombo and Rhodesian teak woodland and shrubland savannah. Vegetation has suffered in recent droughts, and so have the animals that depend on it, particularly antelope.

=== Wildlife ===
The national parks contain abundant wildlife including sizeable populations of African bush elephant, Cape buffalo, giraffe, Grant's zebra, and a variety of antelope. Lions, African leopards and South African cheetahs are only occasionally seen. Vervet monkeys and baboons are common. Southern white rhinoceroses inhabit Mosi-oa-Tunya National Park. Black rhinoceroses roam Victoria Falls Private Game Reserve. The river above the falls contains large populations of hippopotamus and Nile crocodile. Elephant herds cross the river in the dry season at particular crossing points.

Klipspringers, honey badgers, lizards and clawless otters can be glimpsed in the gorges, but they are mainly known for 35 species of raptors. The Taita falcon, Verreaux's eagle, peregrine falcon and augur buzzard breed there. Above the falls, herons, African fish eagles and numerous kinds of waterfowl are common.

=== Fish ===
The river is home to 39 species of fish below the falls and 84 species above it. This illustrates the effectiveness of the falls as a dividing barrier between the upper and lower Zambezi.

=== Effects of climate change ===
In February 2020, National Geographic highlighted the threat to the falls from extreme weather conditions. Rising temperatures make the region hotter and drier. There is substantial water flow variability from year to year, with a significant drop in the general trend of water flow in September, October, November and December. This is particularly pronounced in drought years, which are becoming more frequent and intense. Such occurrences have affected the aesthetics of the waterfalls, and there are fears that Victoria Falls might join other World Heritage sites categorised as last-chance destinations.

Recognition of the risks to the falls has sparked great debate among those in the tourism industry in both Zambia and Zimbabwe.

== Statistics ==
"The Smoke that Thunders", rainy season, 1972 ... and dry season, September 2003
Size and flow rate of Victoria Falls with Niagara and Iguazu for comparison
Parameters	Victoria Falls		Niagara Falls		Iguazu Falls	
Height in meters and feet:	108 m	360 ft	51 m	167 ft	64–82 m	210–269 ft
Width in meters and feet:	1,708 m	5,604 ft	1,203 m	3,947 ft	2,700 m	8,858 ft
Flow rate units (vol/s):	m^{3}/s	cu ft/s	m^{3}/s	cu ft/s	m^{3}/s	cu ft/s
Mean annual flow rate:	1,088	38,430	2,407	85,000	1,746	61,600
Mean monthly flow – max.:	3,000	105,944				
Mean monthly flow – min.:	300	10,594				
Mean monthly flow – 10 yr. max.:	6,000	211,888				
Highest recorded flow:	12,800	452,000	6,800	240,000	45,700	1,614,000
Notes: See references for explanation of measurements. For water, cubic metres per second = tonnes per second. Half the water approaching Niagara is diverted for hydroelectric power. Iguazu has two drops; height given for biggest drop and total height. 10 falls have greater or equal flow rates, but are not as high as Iguazu and Victoria Falls.

== See also ==
- List of waterfalls
- List of waterfalls by flow rate
- List of waterfalls of Zambia
- Batoka Gorge Hydroelectric Power Station
- 2018–19 Southern Africa drought
