= Agnes Baldwin Alexander =

American author

- Born: July 21, 1875; Kingdom of Hawaii
- Died: January 1, 1971 (aged 95); Honolulu, Hawaii
- Known for: Baháʼí missionary

Agnes Baldwin Alexander (1875–1971) was an American author and distinguished member of the Baháʼí Faith.

== Life ==
Agnes Baldwin Alexander was born on July 21, 1875, in the Kingdom of Hawaii. She was the youngest of five children born to William DeWitt Alexander and Abigail Charlotte Alexander, née Baldwin. Miss Alexander was a scion of two of Hawaii's most illustrious Christian missionary families—the Alexanders and the Baldwins. Her father was one of Hawaii's most famous men as President of Oahu College, author of A Brief History of the Hawaiian People, and first Surveyor-General of the Hawaiian Islands.

Alexander graduated from Oahu College in 1895, later doing undergraduate work at Oberlin College and U.C. Berkeley. After teaching for a few years, she fell prey to chronic illness. In 1900, she joined a group of Islanders who were going on a tour of Europe. While in Rome in November of that year, she encountered an American Baháʼí woman and her two daughters who were returning from a Baháʼí pilgrimage in the Holy Land, and they shared with her about the faith. As the result of an epiphany one night, which she described as “neither a dream nor vision”, she embraced the Baháʼí Revelation and accepted it as God's new message to humanity as proclaimed by Baháʼu'lláh.

At the request of Baháʼu'lláh's eldest son, ʻAbdu'l-Bahá, who was then head of the Baháʼí Faith, Miss Alexander pioneered the Baháʼí Faith in Japan in 1914. In 1921 she became the first Baháʼí to introduce the New Gospel in Korea. Except for extended vacations in Hawaii, Agnes spent over thirty years in Japan.

Alexander was an early advocate of Esperanto and used that new international language to help spread Baháʼí teachings at meetings, conferences, and in articles.

In 1957, Bahá'u'lláh's great-grandson Shoghi Effendi, the Guardian of the Baháʼí Faith, appointed Agnes Alexander a Hand of the Cause of God, the highest rank a person may hold as an individual Baháʼí. In 1964, Alexander represented the Universal House of Justice, the supreme administrative body of the Baháʼí Faith, at the election of Hawaii's first National Spiritual Assembly in Honolulu. After suffering a broken hip in 1965, and spending two years in a Tokyo hospital, Agnes Alexander returned to her birthplace in Honolulu in 1967. Ironically, the Arcadia residence where she spent her last four years was adjacent to where she was born on Punahou Street.

On January 1, 1971, Alexander died. She is buried behind Kawaiahao Church amidst her missionary forebears.

== Family tree ==
Agnes Alexander is related to several notable people including: Amos Starr Cooke, David Dwight Baldwin, William Owen Smith, Samuel T. Alexander, Henry P. Baldwin, and Annie Montague Alexander. Her father's parents were William P. Alexander and Mary Ann McKinney, and her mother's parents were Dwight Baldwin and Charlotte Fowler.

== Works ==
Before moving abroad, Miss Alexander owned a popular restaurant in Honolulu. In 1912 she published a cookbook of her recipes entitled "How To Use Hawaiian Fruit".

At the request of Shoghi Effendi, Agnes Alexander wrote two histories: "Personal Recollections of a Bahá’í Life in the Hawaiian Islands: Forty Years of the Bahá’í Cause in Hawaii, 1902-1942" and "History of the Baháʼí Faith in Japan, 1914-1938". Both of these volumes were published posthumously.

== See also ==
- Baháʼí Faith in Japan
