= Wigglesworth (disambiguation) =

Wigglesworth is a village and civil parish in North Yorkshire, England.

Wigglesworth may also refer to:

== Buildings ==
- Wigglesworth Building, a historic building in Boston
- Wigglesworth Hall, a dormitory at Harvard College
- Wigglesworth Hall, home to the history department at Milton Academy

== Other ==
- R v Wigglesworth, a 1987 Supreme Court of Canada decision on the constitutional right against double jeopardy
- Bunny Wigglesworth, a character in the 1981 film, Zorro, The Gay Blade

== People with the surname ==
- Cecil Wigglesworth (1893–1961), English RAF officer and cricketer
- Cindy Wigglesworth, author on the subject of spiritual intelligence
- Edward Wigglesworth (disambiguation)
- Gillian Wigglesworth, Australian linguist
- Mark Wigglesworth (born 1964), British music conductor
- Michael Wigglesworth (1631–1705), New England Puritan minister and poet
- Philip Wigglesworth (1896–1975), Air Marshal in the Royal Air Force
- Richard Wigglesworth (rugby union) (born 1983), English rugby union player
- Richard B. Wigglesworth (1891–1960), American football player and coach and U.S. Representative from Massachusetts
- Ryan Wigglesworth (born 1979), composer, conductor and pianist born in Yorkshire, England
- Smith Wigglesworth (1859–1947), British evangelist
- Tom Wigglesworth, a candidate of the Family Coalition Party in the 1995 Ontario provincial election
- Vincent Wigglesworth (1899–1994), British entomologist and discoverer of prothoracicotropic hormone (PTTH)
- Frank Wigglesworth Clarke (1847–1931), American scientist, sometimes known as the "Father of Geochemistry"
- Wigglesworth Dole (1779–1845), patriarch of an influential American family
- Kelly Wiglesworth (born 1977), contestant in the CBS reality series Survivor: Borneo
- Helen Worth (born Cathryn Helen Wigglesworth in 1951), English actress
- A prominent Boston Brahmin family
- Wrigglesworth, member of UK band Public Service Broadcasting
