= Edward Wigglesworth =

Edward Wigglesworth may refer to:

- Edward Michael Wigglesworth (c. 1693–1765), clergyman and teacher in colonial America
- Edward Wigglesworth (1732–1794), professor of divinity at Harvard College
- Edward Samuel Wigglesworth (1741–1826), commander of the 13th Massachusetts Regiment, also known as Wigglesworth's State Regiment, and 6th Continental Regiment, during the American Revolutionary War

== See also ==
- Wigglesworth (disambiguation)
