= Wigglesworth Dole =

Patriarch of the Dole family (1779–1845)

- Born: November 17, 1779; Newburyport, Province of Massachusetts Bay
- Died: June 16, 1845 (aged 65); Canaan, Maine
- Spouse: Elizabeth Haskell
- Children: Daniel Dole; Three others

Wigglesworth Dole (November 17, 1779 – June 16, 1845) was a patriarch of an influential American family.

== Biography ==
Wigglesworth Dole was born on November 17, 1779, in Newburyport, Massachusetts, and then moved to Maine. His father was Nathaniel Dole (1739–1790) and his mother was Mary Noyes (1740–1824).

He was the youngest of eight children. The given name of Wigglesworth might seem unusual today, but in the 18th century a well-known family of educators in New England had descended from Michael Wigglesworth (1631–1705). An older brother Samuel Dole (1778–?) married Katherine Wigglesworth (1780–?) who was Michael Wigglesworth's great-granddaughter.

Their grandson was painter Enoch Wood Perry Jr. (1831–1915). Another older brother Ebenezer Dole (1776–1847) became an early anti-slavery activist in Hallowell, Maine.

Dole married Elizabeth Haskell on March 11, 1807. She was born August 30, 1788, in Deer Isle, Maine, and died in 1877. They had four children, and lived in an area called Bloomfield, later called Skowhegan, Maine. Dole worked as a cabinet maker and kept a small farm, while serving as Deacon of a Congregational Church. He died on June 16, 1845, in Canaan, Maine (also called Bloomfield at the time).

His first-born son Daniel Dole (1808–1878) became a missionary to the Hawaiian Islands, and founding principal of Punahou School. Daniel's son Sanford Ballard Dole became the first Governor of the Territory of Hawaii.

His second son Nathan Dole (1811–1855) had two sons, Charles Fletcher Dole (1845–1927) and Nathan Haskell Dole (1852–1935). His great-grandson James Drummond Dole (1877–1958) founded what became the Dole Food Company.

Not much is known about daughter Elizabeth Dole (1815–1863).

His third son Isaiah Dole, born May 23, 1819, was a classical-language teacher, married Elizabeth Todd Pearson August 18, 1844, and died May 17, 1892. Isaiah and Elizabeth had a son Edmund Pearson Dole (1850–1928), who was the Attorney General of Hawaii, and daughter who married William J. Sewall.

Daniel, Nathan and Isaiah all graduated from Bowdoin College.
