= First Parish in Malden =

- First Parish in Malden, Universalist
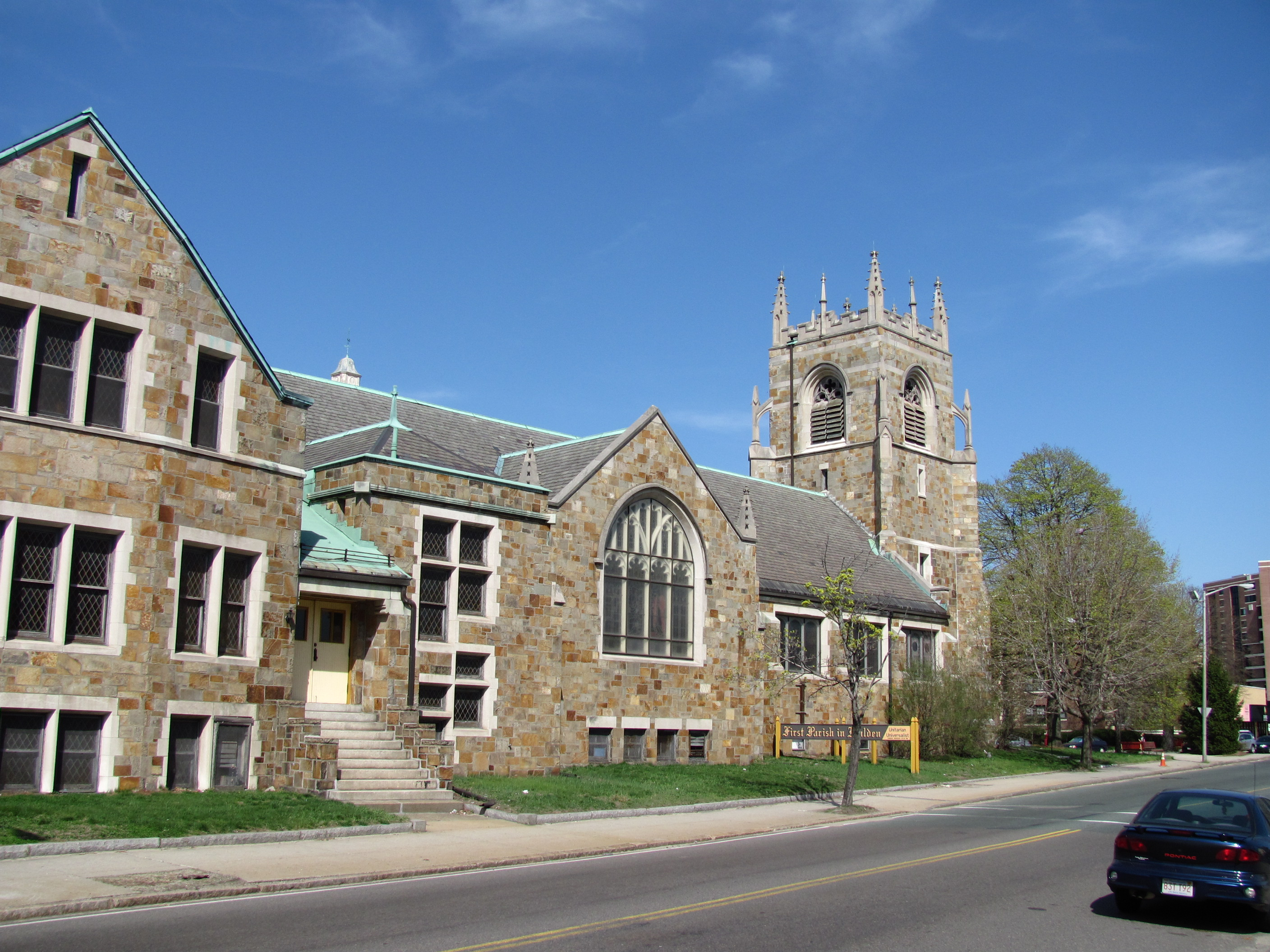
- First Parish Universalist Church
- First Parish in Malden
- 42.4272°N 71.0779°W
- Location: Malden, Massachusetts
- Country: U.S.
- Denomination: Unitarian Universalism
- Website: www.fpmalden.org

History
- Status: Church
- Founded: 1649

Architecture
- Functional status: Active
- Architectural type: Neogothic Revival
- Completed: 1909

First Parish in Malden, Universalist is a Unitarian Universalist ("UU") church in Malden, Massachusetts and a member congregation of the Unitarian Universalist Association. It was gathered in 1648 to support the establishment of the city of Malden. It is one of the oldest churches in Massachusetts. The current minister is the Rev. Otto Concannon, who was called to be the congregation's minister in 2017.

== History ==
=== Establishment of the Parish ===
The first colonists living in what was then called "Mystic Side" attended the church in Charlestown, which forced the settlers to make a long journey, including taking a ferry. At the time, only church members were freemen and constituents of the body politic. As the ability to vote was tied to membership in the church, the residents of Mystic Side were eager to establish their own church; and gathered themselves in 1648, despite not having the permission from the General Court to assemble.

In 1650 the Parish ordained its first regular minister, Marmaduke Matthews. Matthews had been preaching in Hull, Massachusetts but had lost the favor of the freemen there, and thus his ordination in Malden was opposed by the other churches and by the magistrates of the General Court. Matthews was ordained while the General Court sought to hold public inquiry into his "erroneous expressions, others weak, unconvenient and unsafe expressions" in his preaching. As a result of this conflict with neighboring churches, the historical record suggests that Matthews was lay-ordained, instead of ordained by the elder Charlestown congregation as was customary.

The second ordained minister to preach in Malden was Michael Wigglesworth, a preacher and poet who was renowned for his scriptural poem The Day of Doom.

== Recent Years ==
The congregation unanimously called the Rev. Otto Concannon as its settled minister in 2017, making him the 36th settled minister. In line with other member congregations of the UUA, the congregation adheres to the Unitarian Universalist faith and affirms the Seven Principles of Unitarian Universalism. In 2009 the church voted to become LGBT affirming and were joined by Tonya McCloskey and Marcia Kadish, the first same sex couple to marry in Massachusetts.
