= Charles Dole =

Charles Dole may refer to:

- Charles Minot Dole (1899–1976), founder of the National Ski Patrol
- Charles Fletcher Dole (1845–1927), Unitarian minister
