= RAF Iceland =

Former command of the Royal Air Force

RAF Iceland No. 30 (Coastal) Wing RAF 29th (Training) Wing RFC
- Royal Air Force Ensign
- Active: July 1941 - July 1945
- Country: United Kingdom
- Branch: Royal Air Force
- Type: Royal Air Force command
- Role: Anti-submarine warfare Commerce raiding Aerial reconnaissance Air-sea rescue Meteorological Flight
- Part of: RAF Coastal Command
- Engagements: Second World War: Battle of the Atlantic

Commanders
- Notable commanders: Air Commodore Cecil George Wigglesworth CB, AFC

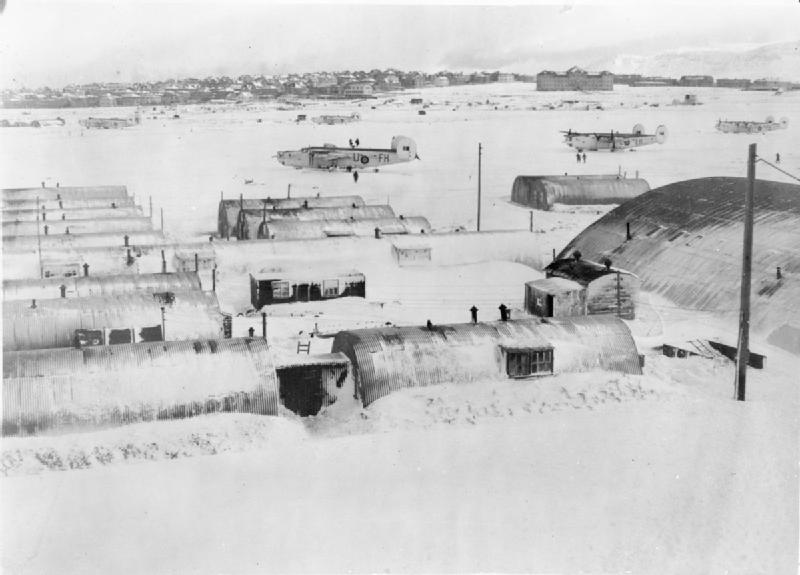
Snowed-up technical huts and airfield at Reykjavik, Iceland, during a lull in the blizzard which hit the island between 21 and 27 February 1945. Consolidated Liberator GR Mark VIs of No.53 Squadron RAF are parked on the airfield

RAF Iceland is a former Royal Air Force command which controlled RAF units within Iceland. The command was operational between July 1941 and July 1945 during the Second World War, the unit was previously No. 30 Wing RAF.

== History ==
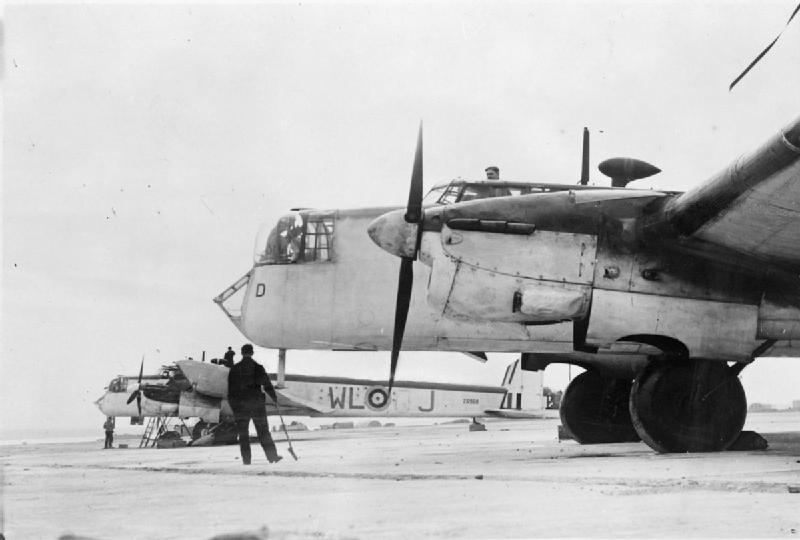
Two Armstrong Whitworth Whitley Mark Vs (Z6968, 'WL-J' furthest), of No. 612 Squadron RAF, lined up beside the runway at Reykjavik, Iceland. The Air Ministry censor has obliterated the ASV radar aerials atop the fuselage of Z6968

RAF Iceland was formed on 2 July 1941, as an overseas command, within RAF Coastal Command. The following year, by April 1942, the command controlled two airfields in Iceland with four operational units. No. 269 Squadron was operating Lockheed Hudson bomber, reconnaissance, transport, and maritime patrol aircraft, out of RAF Kaldadarnes, which was situated near the town of Selfoss. RAF Reykjavik, at Reykjavík Airport, was home to No. 330 Squadron which operated with Northrop N-3PB Nomad, a single-engined American floatplane, No. 612 Squadron which was equipped with Armstrong Whitworth Whitley, a British medium bomber aircraft, and No. 1407 (Meteorological) Flight RAF which used Lockheed Hudson, an American light bomber and coastal reconnaissance aircraft. The command controlled the Iceland Ferry Control Unit which was formed at Reykjavik on 11 August 1942.

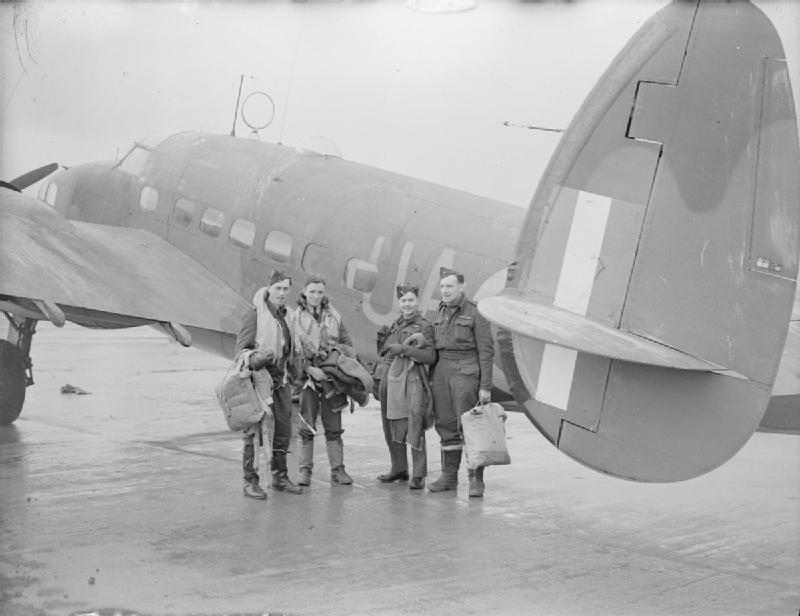
U-boats were not the only threat to the convoys in northern latitudes. A watch had to be kept on the Arctic pack-ice, the extent and composition of which varied depending on the time of year. To this end No 269 Squadron in Iceland flew regular 'ice patrols' over the Denmark Strait between Iceland and Greenland. A Hudson crew prepares to climb aboard their aircraft, May 1942

By April 1943, No. 612 Squadron had returned to the UK, to RAF Thorney Island. No. 1407 (Meteorological) Flight RAF remained at RAF Reykjavik, but was now using Handley Page Hampden, a British twin-engine medium bomber, and No. 330 Squadron had moved to RAF Oban, but operated a detachment of Northrop N-3PB Nomad, at RAF Reykjavik July 1944 saw only RAF Reykjavik in use. No. 1407 (Meteorological) Flight RAF was still based in Iceland and was back to operating with Lockheed Hudson. No. 86 Squadron was now based at RAF Reykjavik and was equipped with Consolidated Liberator, a four-engined American heavy bomber, and No. 279 Squadron operated a detachment at this point, with Lockheed Hudson. By July 1945 it was down to a single unit. No. 1407 (Meteorological) Flight RAF had disbanded at RAF Reykjavik on 1 August 1944 to become No. 251 Squadron. The squadron was operating out of RAF Reykjavik, equipped with the Boeing Flying Fortress GR Mk. II (a reconnaissance variant of the B-17). when the RAF Iceland command disbanded, during July 1945.

History of No. 30 Wing RAF

No. 30 Wing RAF as formed as 29th (Training) Wing RFC on 1 June 1917 at Edinburgh controlling Montrose Aerodrome and Turnhouse Aerodrome. On the formation of the Royal Air Force it was transferred to 21st Group RAF and moved to Montrose on 22 July 1918. The wing was disbanded during October 1918.

The wing was reformed on 22 March 1941 as No. 30 (Coastal) Wing RAF at RAF Reykjavik and became RAF Iceland on 2 July 1941.

== Air Officer Commanding ==
Note: The ranks shown are the ranks held at the time of holding the appointment of Air Officer Commanding, RAF Iceland.

RAF Iceland commanding officers
Rank	name	from
Air Commodore	William Harold Primrose	unknown
Air Commodore	Cecil George Wigglesworth	20 September 1943
Air Commodore	Gerald Harold Boyce	4 January 1945

== See also ==
- List of Royal Air Force commands
- RAF Coastal Command
