= Phipps Street Burying Ground =

Historic cemetery in Massachusetts, United States

- U.S. National Register of Historic Places
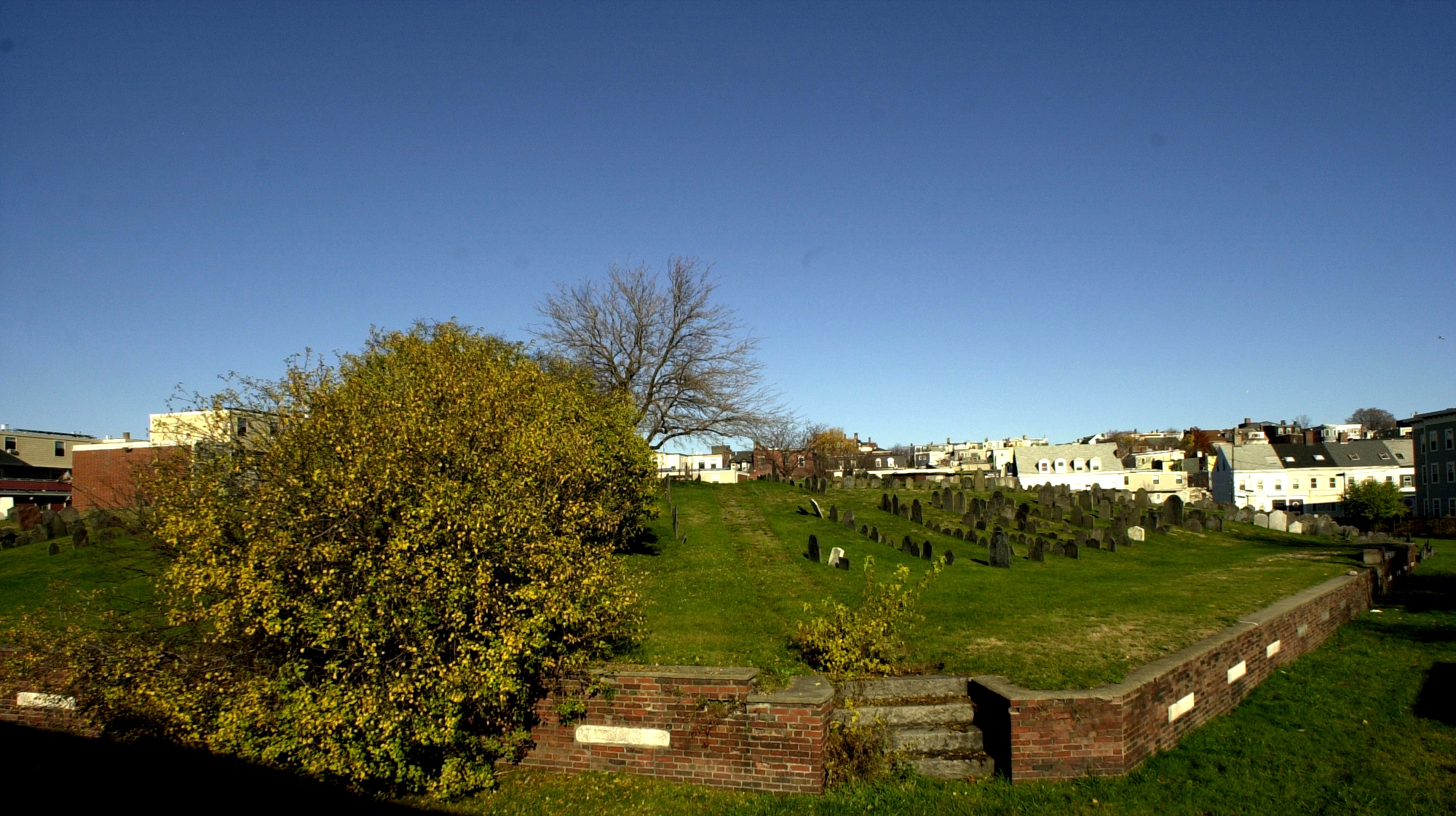

- Location within Boston Location within Massachusetts Location within the United States
- Location: Phipps Street, Charlestown; Boston, Massachusetts
- Coordinates: 42°22′35″N 71°4′4″W
- Area: 1.8 acres (0.73 ha)
- Built: 1630
- NRHP reference No.: 74000907
- Added to NRHP: May 14, 1974

The Phipps Street Burying Ground is a historic cemetery on Phipps Street in Charlestown, now a neighborhood of Boston, Massachusetts.

== History ==
The burial ground was created in 1630, when Charlestown was a separate community from Boston; it is the oldest cemetery within Boston's present limits. The "Charlestown Carver", an anonymous stone cutter active in the 1660s, began an important regional style that was continued by the Lamson family for many generations.

The cemetery was added to the National Register of Historic Places in 1974.

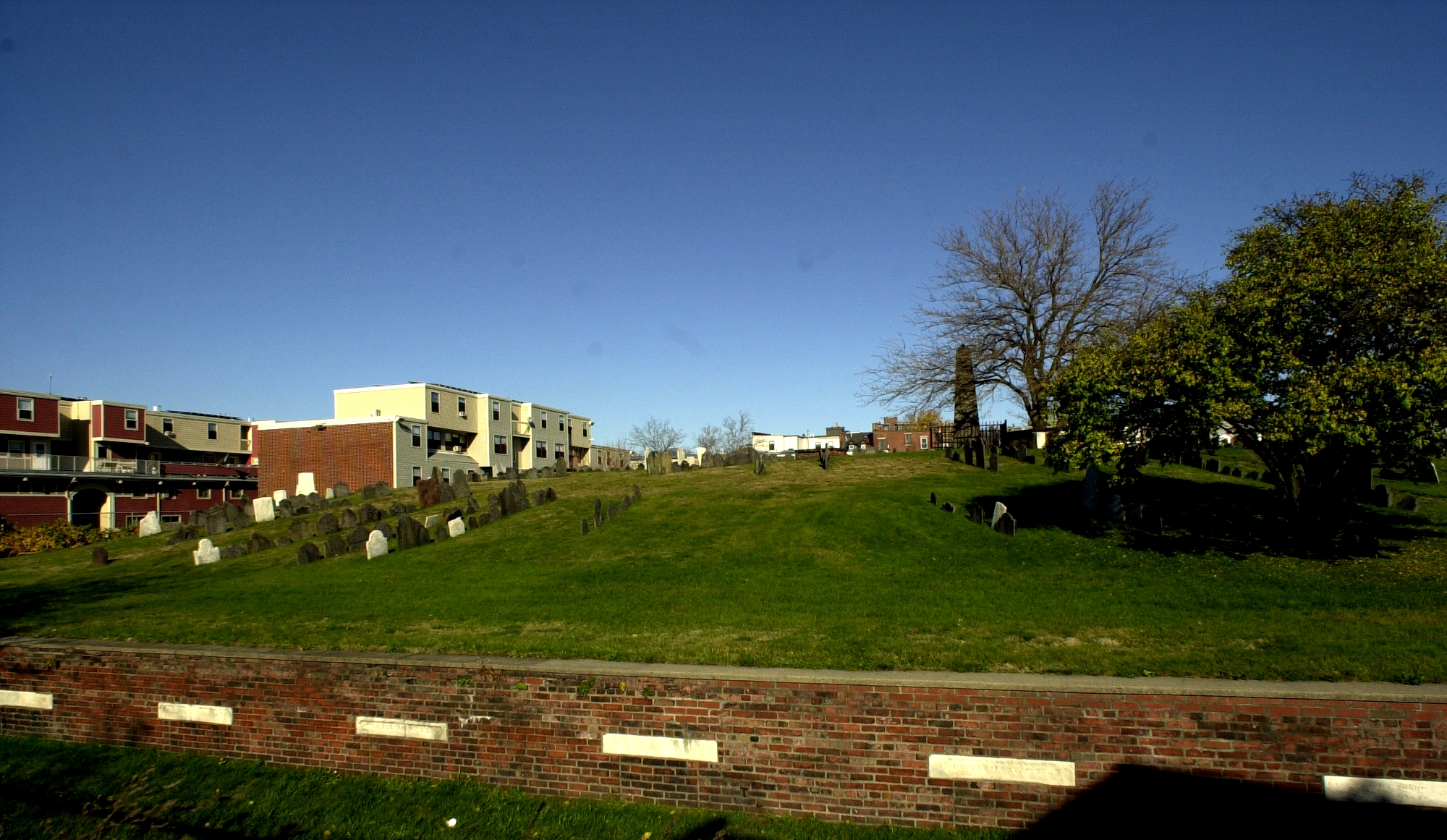

== Interments ==
Since it was the only cemetery in Charlestown (which was annexed to Boston in the 19th century) for many years, it had a wide range of class and situation:

- Prince Bradstreet, "an honest man of color".
- Benjamin Gorham, Congressman 1820–23, 1827–31, 1833–35.
- Nathaniel Gorham, president of the Continental Congress and signer of the United States Constitution.
- John Harvard, for whom Harvard University is named.
- Oliver Holden, an American composer and compiler of hymns.
- Edward Michael Wigglesworth (c. 1693–1765), a clergyman, teacher and theologian in Colonial America.
- Phineas Pratt, a joiner, arrived 1622, aboard Sparrow with Weston's men. Made a solo, treacherous trek to Plymouth to warn Standish of the Indian uprising at Wessagusset (Weymouth).

== See also ==
- List of cemeteries in Boston
- National Register of Historic Places listings in northern Boston, Massachusetts
