= Enoch Wood Perry Jr. =

American painter (1831–1915)

- Born: July 31, 1831; Boston, Massachusetts, United States
- Died: December 14, 1915 (aged 84); New York City, New York, United States
- Occupation: Painter
- Known for: Landscape painting, portrait painting

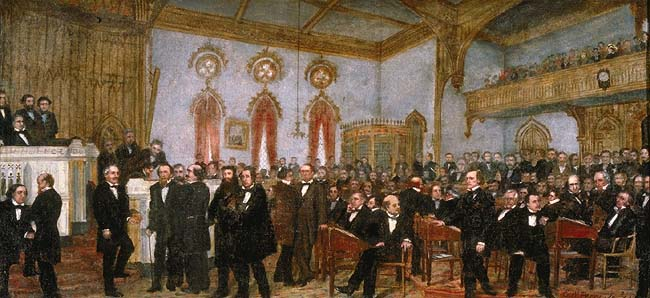
'Signing the Ordinance of Secession of Louisiana, January 26, 1861', oil on canvas painting, 1861

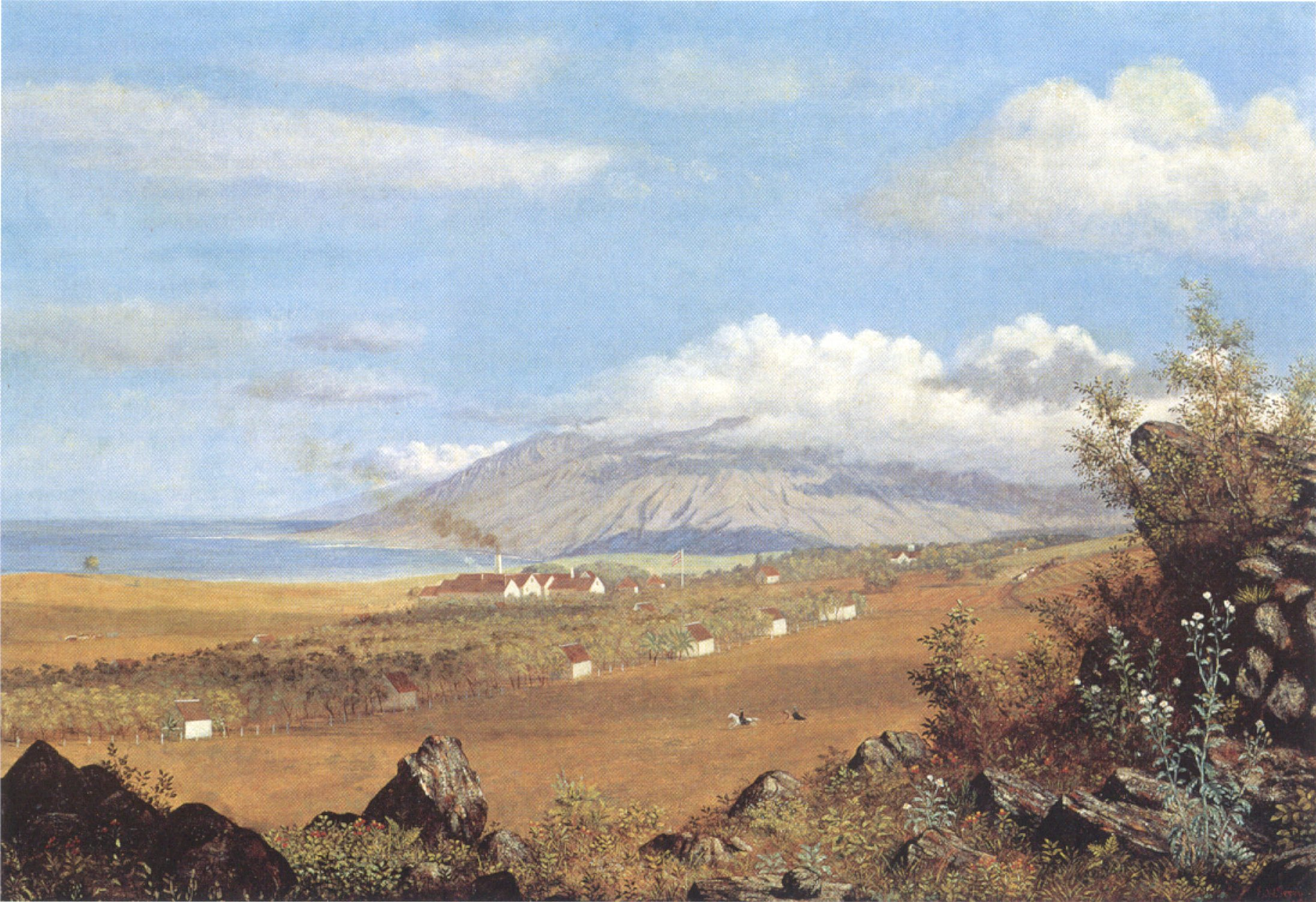
'Rose Ranch, Ulupalakua, on the Slopes of Haleakala, Maui', 1865, oil painting, Honolulu Museum of Art

Enoch Wood Perry Jr. (July 31, 1831 – December 14, 1915), was an American painter, from Boston. He was known for his portraits and landscape paints; and he lived in Philadelphia, Pennsylvania; New Orleans, Louisiana; Northern California; Hawaii; and New York City.

== Early life and education ==
Perry was born in Boston on July 31, 1831. His father was Enoch Wood Perry, and mother was Hannah Knapp Dole. His maternal grandparents were Samuel Dole and Katherine Wigglesworth. Perry moved to New Orleans with his family as a teenager in 1848 and attended its public schools.

After working several years as a clerk in a commission house, Perry began formal art education. In 1852 he went to Europe for four years and studied with Emanuel Leutze at the Düsseldorf Academy, Thomas Couture in Paris, and in Rome.

Perry served as the U.S. consul to Venice between 1856 and 1858.

== Career ==
Upon returning to America, he opened a studio in Philadelphia. On the eve of the American Civil War, Perry moved back to New Orleans and opened a studio in 1860. He painted a portrait of Senator John Slidell and the signing the Ordinance of Secession of Louisiana by early 1861. Later in 1861 Perry completed a portrait of Jefferson Davis posed before a map of the Confederate States of America, which was raffled off at a fair with the proceeds benefiting the southern war effort.

He traveled to northern California, where he spent several years sketching and painting with Albert Bierstadt, taking special interest in Yosemite Valley. While there he painted a portrait of future governor Washington Bartlett.

Around 1864, Perry sailed to Honolulu, with the idea of painting the wonders of nature there, and was well received. His cousin once removed Daniel Dole was a missionary teacher in Hawaii. Perry traveled to most of the islands, and painted landscapes and portraits, including posthumous images of King Kamehameha IV and his young son Prince Albert Edward Kauikeaouli Leiopapa a Kamehameha, as well as Hawaiian landscapes.

In 1865 Perry painted a portrait of Brigham Young which hangs in the Salt Lake City Council chambers. It was reported that a spitoon and ring with freemasonry symbols were removed from the painting.

Perry then lived in New York City where he married Fannie Field on February 4, 1899.

== Death and legacy ==
Perry died at his home in New York City on December 14, 1915.

The Addison Gallery of American Art in Andover, Massachusetts; the Bishop Museum in Honolulu, Hawaii; the Fine Arts Museums of San Francisco; the Honolulu Museum of Art; the Louisiana State Museum in New Orleans; and the Metropolitan Museum of Art in New York are among the public collections holding works by Perry.
