= James Dole =

American food industrialist (1877–1958)

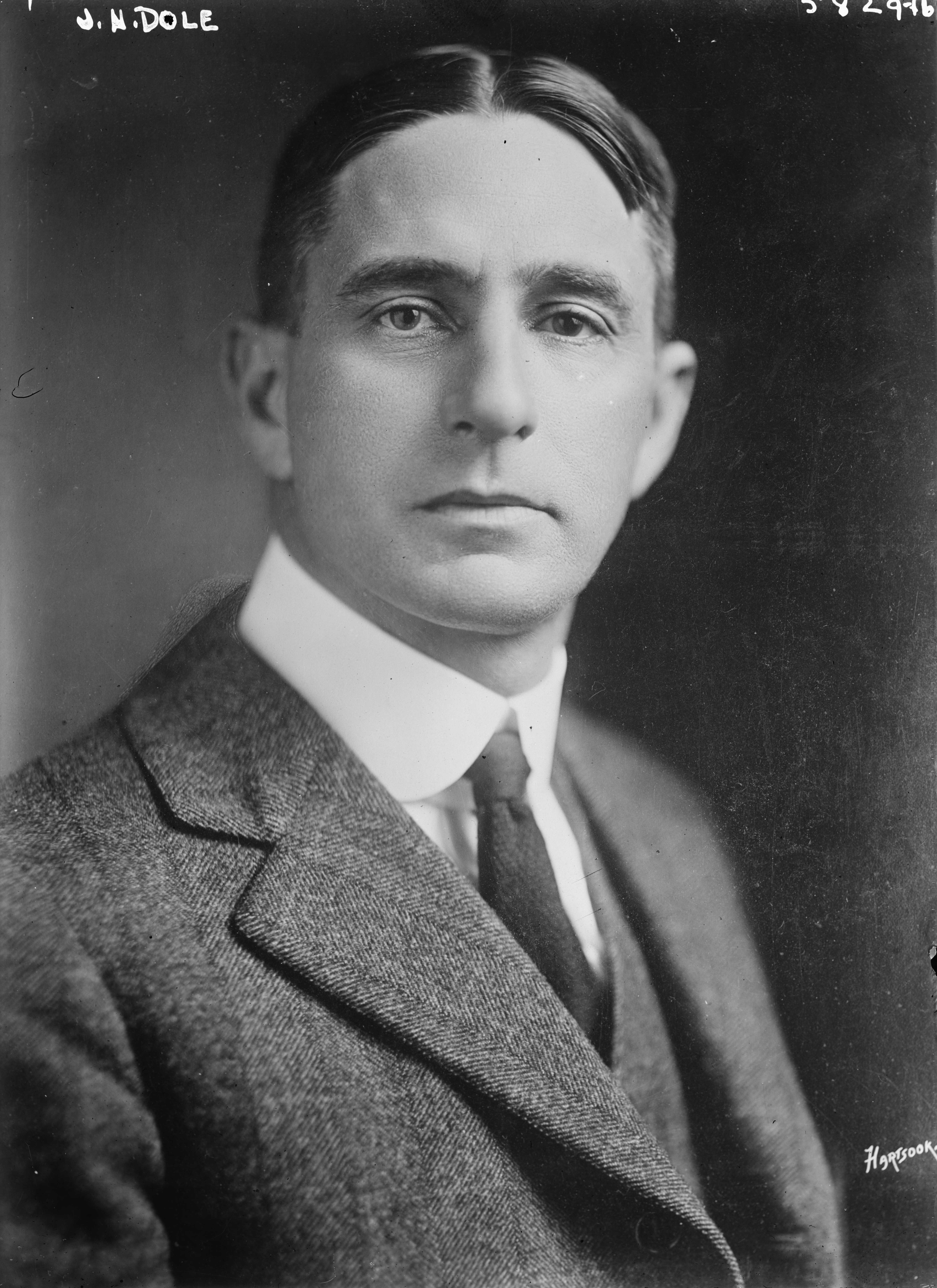
- Dole, c. 1927
- Born: James Drummond Dole; September 27, 1877; Jamaica Plain, Massachusetts, U.S.
- Died: May 20, 1958 (aged 80); Honolulu, Hawaii Territory, U.S.
- Education: Roxbury Latin School; Harvard University
- Spouse: Belle Dickey
- Children: 5
- Parent(s): Charles Fletcher Dole; Frances Drummond

James Drummond Dole (September 27, 1877 – May 20, 1958), the "Pineapple King", was an American industrialist who developed the pineapple industry in Hawaii. He established the Hawaiian Pineapple Company (HAPCO) which was later reorganized to become the Dole Food Company that operates in over 90 countries. Dole was a cousin (once removed) of Sanford B. Dole, President of the Republic of Hawaii.

- James D. Dole Homestead
- U.S. National Register of Historic Places
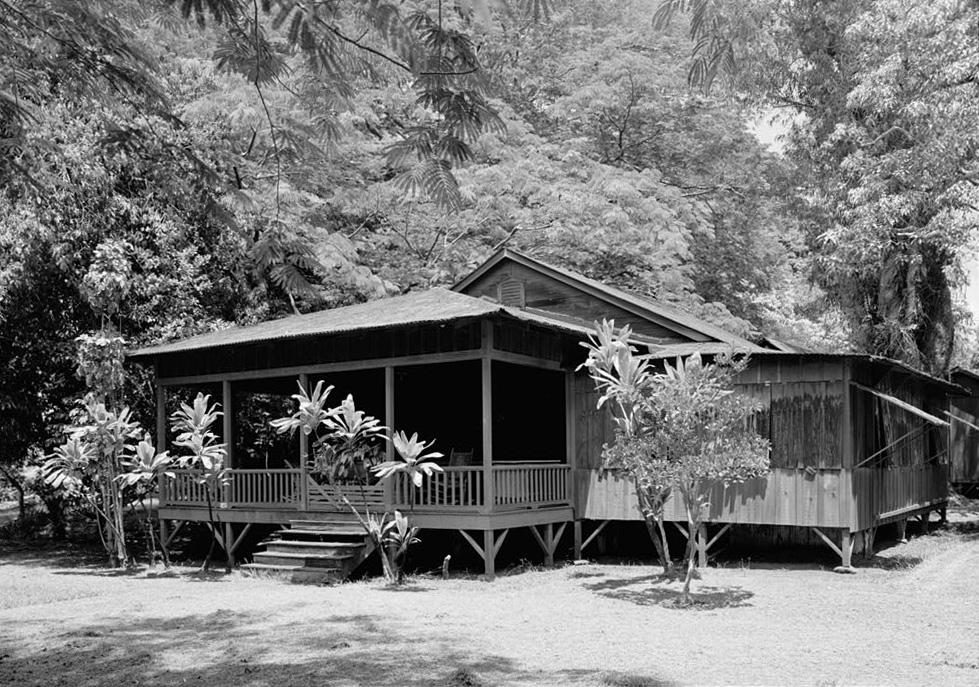
- Area: 8.58 acres (3.47 ha)
- Built: 1901
- NRHP reference No.: 78001024
- Added to NRHP: June 23, 1978

== Early life ==
James Dole was born on September 27, 1877, in Jamaica Plain, Massachusetts (now part of Boston), to an American Puritan family long settled in the country since colonial America times. His father was Charles Fletcher Dole, a Unitarian minister, and his mother was Frances Drummond. His paternal great-grandfather was Wigglesworth Dole (1779–1845). His maternal grandfather was also a clergyman, James Drummond. Growing up, Dole attended Roxbury Latin School in Roxbury, Massachusetts, from which he graduated.

In 1899, Dole obtained his bachelor's degree in agriculture from the Bussey Institution of Harvard University. After receiving US$50 as a gift, Dole began saving money for a future business. After accumulating $16,240, Dole moved to Honolulu, Hawaii, at the age of 22, arriving on November 16, 1899, (then governed by his cousin Sanford B. Dole, after the 1893 overthrow of Queen Liliʻuokalani). He purchased a 64-acre (26 ha) government homestead in the central plains of the island of Oahu at 21°30′30″N 158°0′22″W. After experimenting with a number of crops, he settled on planting pineapple.

== Hawaiian Pineapple Company ==
His farm grew, and Dole constructed a cannery and packing plant in the town of Wahiawa. Soon, yields and popularity of his product proved greater than he expected and Dole built a new cannery and packing plant near Honolulu Harbor. That same year, 1907, Dole purchased magazine advertisements to promote his canned pineapples. He developed the first nationwide consumer ad campaign in the United States and was successful. Demand for Hawaiian pineapple grew even more.

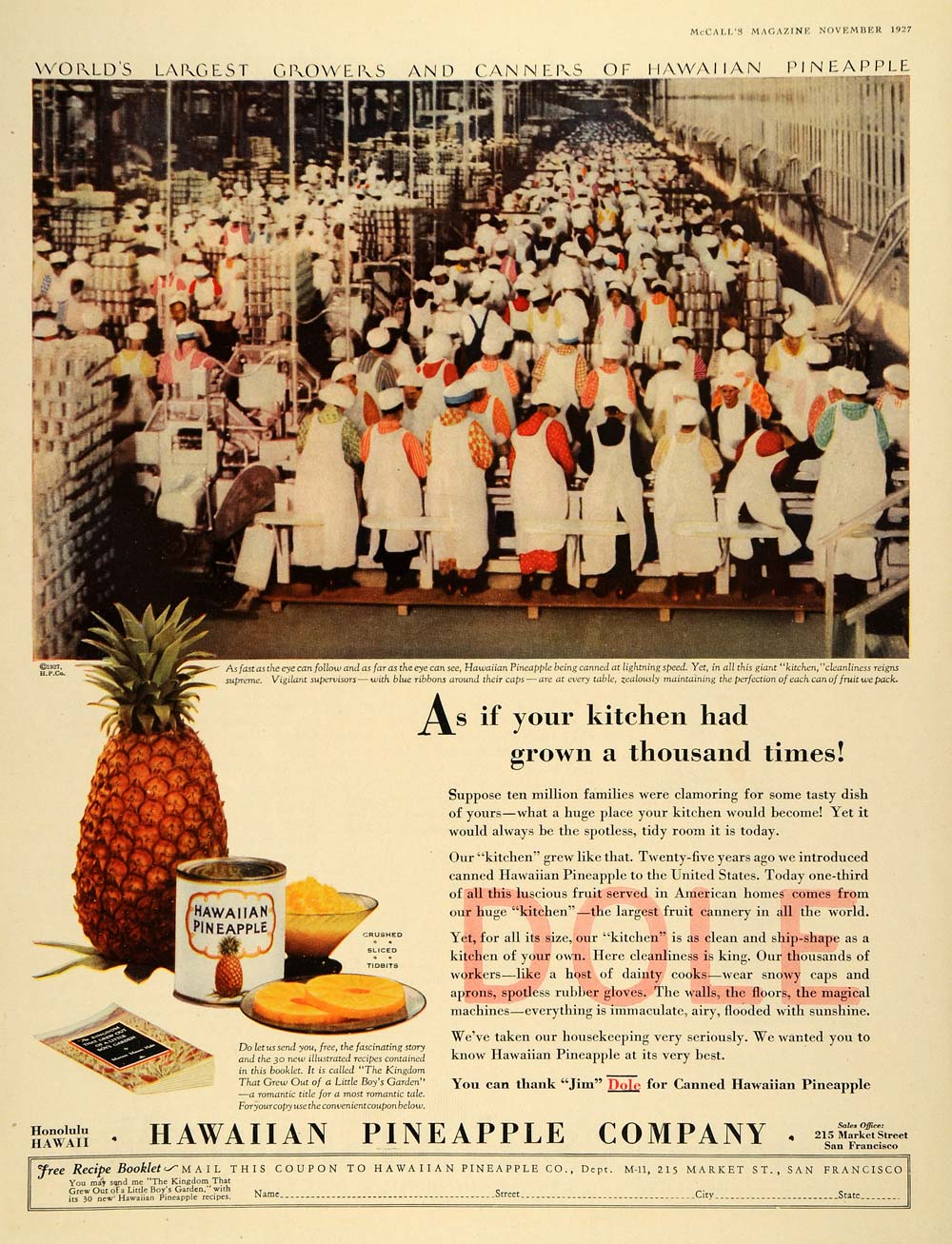
Dole factory employees mentioned in a magazine advertisement in 1927. Celebrating 25 years of canned pineapple production.

In 1913, Dole invested in a new machine invented by Henry Gabriel Ginaca that could peel and core 35 pineapples every minute. Before the invention, Dole had to contend with the slow pace of having hundreds of workers peel and core each pineapple by hand. With a fully mechanized outfit, Dole's business boomed once more. Rival pineapple companies slowly began to adopt the Ginaca machine, seeing how much Dole improved his business with the introduction of new technologies. During this period, the Hawaiian pineapple sector was at its most profitable as various small companies operating on comparatively modern small land made middling income for the operators. However, this was about to change as Dole was soon to corner the market and turn it into a single mighty industry dominated by a small group of companies who mass-produced the fruit for the rest of the global market.

By 1922, Dole had managed to convince his family's network in Hawaii and in Boston to arrange for a sizable capital investment fund with which he purchased the island of Lānaʻi and developed it as a vast pineapple plantation. It became the largest plantation in the world with over 20,000 acres (8,100 ha) devoted exclusively to growing pineapple. Utilizing large mechanized production and importing large numbers of foreign workers who were paid at indentured servitude levels, Dole managed to reduce the price of his pineapples to such a level that it drove every other producer out of the business which didn't fall into line with his scheme. With this vast pineapple cultivation at the company's disposal, throughout the 20th century, Lānaʻi produced over seventy-five percent of the world's pineapple crop, thereby dominating the market, and in turn, the place acquired the nickname of Pineapple Island. Dole also purchased land on the island of Maui. The largest competitors in the production of pineapple in Hawaii were Maui based affiliates of Alexander & Baldwin.

In 1927, inspired by Charles Lindbergh's successful trans-Atlantic flight, and seeing the potential air transportation could play in delivering his fruit, thereby making an end-run around what remained of his competitors in the Alexander & Baldwin affiliated Matson Navigation Company, Dole sponsored the Dole Air Race, putting up a prize of US$25,000 for the first airplane to fly from Oakland, California, to Honolulu, and US$10,000 for second place. Those prizes were won by the only two airplanes to survive the flight. Ten other people died in their attempts. Dole contributed reward money to find the missing planes, but no trace was ever found. A third plane who joined the rescue efforts was also lost and unrecovered.

However, these investments in land, mechanization, and finally air transportation combined with the resulting decrease in the price of pineapples, placed the company in a vulnerable price position. Because pineapples take two years to grow to maturity, the Great Depression of the 1930s and the resulting decrease in demand caused the company to lose money. By December 1932 Dole was removed from management of the company and replaced by Atherton Richards, the grandson of Joseph Ballard Atherton. At that time, Castle & Cooke took a stake in the company.

== Family and retirement ==
Dole married Belle Dickey (1880–1972) in Jamaica Plain on November 23, 1906. His wife was the sister of architect Charles William Dickey, a member of another missionary family. They had five children: Richard Alexander Dole was born on October 28, 1907, James Drummond Dole, Jr. was born on February 6, 1910, Elisabeth Dole was born on April 25, 1911, Charles Herbert Dole was born on October 30, 1914, and Barbara Dole (married to Tambi Larsen) was born on October 10, 1916.

Sanford Dole had asked to avoid using the Dole name for products, but it had become well-known, at least within Hawaii. The first product to actually bear his name was the canned Dole pineapple juice. Dole retired in 1948. He suffered from various ailments in retirement; the worst were a series of strokes. A heart attack finally took Dole's life on May 20, 1958.

Dole was buried in Makawao Union Church cemetery near Makawao, Hawaii, on the island of Maui. His grave overlooked the slopes of Haleakala and the vast pineapple fields of what was at the time his Maui pineapple plantation. His wife Belle inscribed the words on his gravestone, "He was a Man, Take Him All in All. I Shall Not Look Upon His Like Again."

== Legacy ==
About 8.5 acres (3.4 ha) of the original estate, including surrounding horticultural gardens, was kept in the Dole family until 1972. Although his original three-room house collapsed in 1971, a kitchen house from 1901, and a prefabricated building constructed in 1905 and expanded around 1909 for his growing family, remained but were deteriorating. In the late 1970s, the new owners developed the land into suburban residences. The remaining structures were removed from Wahiawa for the new subdivision. The Waipahu Cultural Garden in Waipahu, Hawaii, at 21°23′7″N 158°0′43″W recreated a Hawaiian plantation village.

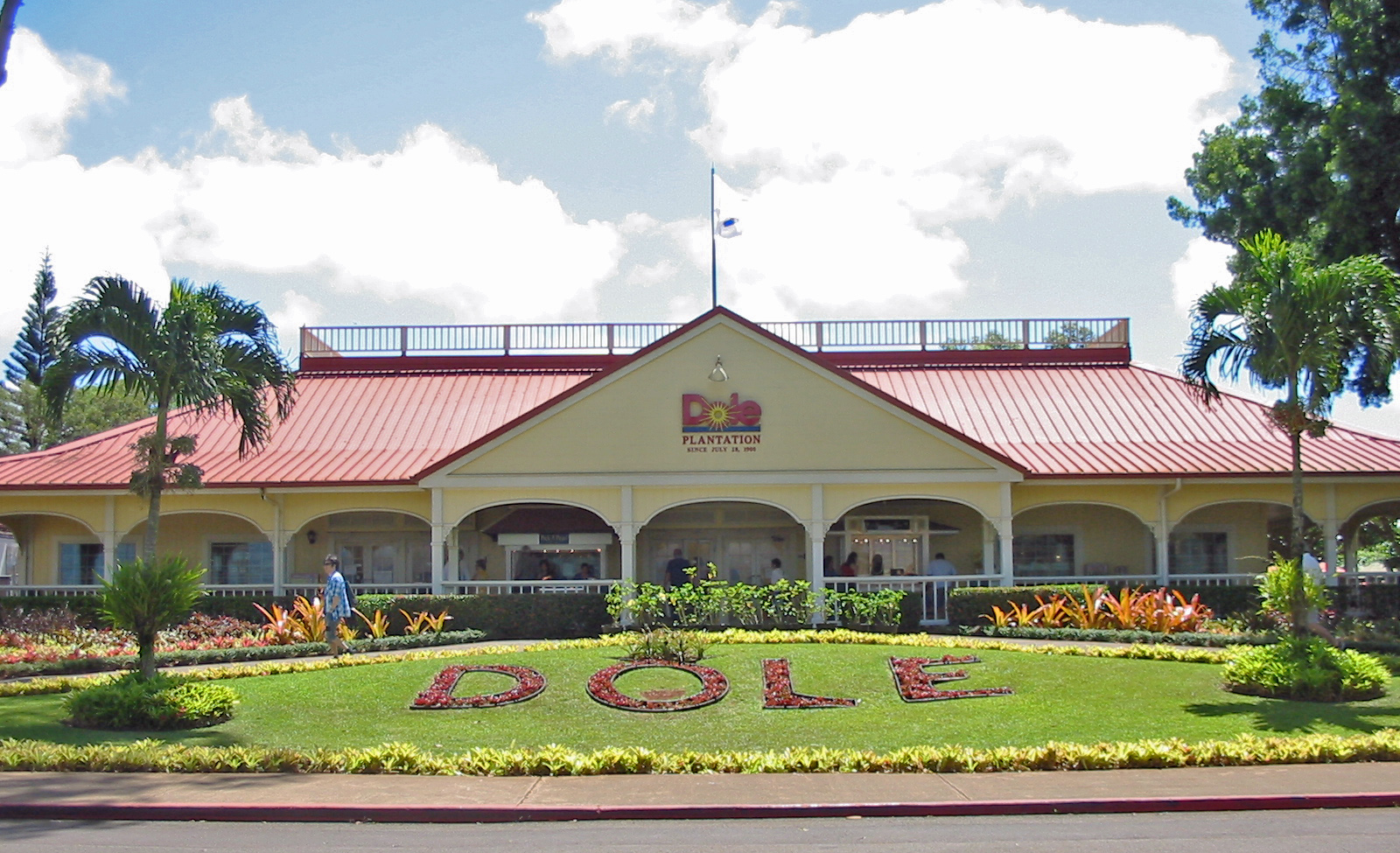
Dole Pineapple Plantation tourist attraction

The tourist attraction known as the Dole Plantation was established in 1950 as a small fruit stand in the middle of Dole's original pineapple fields. In 1989, the fruit stand was transformed into a plantation home mounted on what looks like a hill of red dirt, characteristic of Wahiawa. The plantation home became a living museum and historical archive of the life and work of the industrialist. It is located off of Kamehameha Highway (Route 99), at 21°31′32″N 158°2′15″W.

The plantation features the world's largest maze, grown entirely out of Hawaiian plants. Originally built in 1998, it lost its place in the Guinness Book of World Records until it was expanded in July 2007. The maze covers 137,194 square feet (12,746 m^{2}) and paths are 13,001 feet (3,963 m) long.

The "Pineapple Express" is a two-mile (3 km) train ride through the plantation that is fully animated, while explaining the history of the pineapple. The plantation garden tour gives information about North Shore, the Hibiscus, native species, the Lei, irrigation, Bromeliads, the Ti Leaf, and Life on the plantation.

In 1991, the Dole Cannery closed its operations and was transformed into a multi-purpose facility with media studios, conference rooms and ballrooms. The lower levels houses a modern shopping center and an 18-screen multiplex cinema owned by Regal Entertainment Group. The actual ginaca machines and cannery storage were preserved and turned into a museum of Hawaiian Pineapple Company history. The cannery is located in the area known as Iwilei, between Honolulu Harbor and Kapālama, at 650 Iwilei Road Honolulu, 21°18′56″N 157°52′13″W, and ballrooms across the street.

== Family tree ==
=== In-laws' family ===
Alexander & Baldwin family tree

William P. Alexander (1805–1884)	Mary Ann McKinney (1810–1888)	Amos Starr Cooke (1810–1871)	Juliette Montague (1812–1896)	Dwight Baldwin (1798–1886)	Charlotte Fowler (1805–1873)	J. W. Smith (1810–1887
David Dwight Baldwin (1831–1912)	W. O. Smith (1848–1929)
William D. Alexander (1833–1913)	Abigail Baldwin (1847–1912)	Samuel T. Alexander (1836–1904)	Martha Eliza Cooke	Ann Elizabeth Alexander (1843–1940)	Henry P. Baldwin (1842–1911)	Emily Whitney Alexander (1846–1943)
Agnes Alexander (1875–1971)	Annie Montague Alexander (1867–1950)	C.W. Dickey (1871–1942)	Belle Dickey (1880–1972)	James Dole (1877–1958)	Henry Alexander Baldwin (1871–1946)	Ethel Frances Smith (1879–1967)
J. Walter Cameron (1895–1976)	Francis Baldwin (1904–1996)
Colin C. Cameron (1927–1992) (Kapalua)
