= Henry Gabriel Ginaca =

Official patent drawing of the Ginaca machine

Henry Gabriel Ginaca (May 19, 1876 – October 19, 1918) was an American engineer who invented, at the direction of Hawaii pineapple magnate James Dole, a machine that could peel and core pineapples automatically called the Ginaca machine.

== Biography ==
Ginaca was born on May 19, 1876, in either California or Nevada. His first job was at the San Francisco Union Iron Works. He was later hired by the Honolulu Iron Works. In 1911, he began working for James Dole at the Hawaiian Pineapple Company. After inventing the "Ginaca Machine", Ginaca and his brothers returned to California in 1914. He died on October 19, 1918, in Hornitos, California, during the Spanish flu epidemic.

== The "Ginaca Machine" ==
Ginaca was hired by James Dole in 1911 to build a machine that could make canning pineapples more efficient. By 1913, Ginaca built a machine that removed the pineapple skin, then cored and sliced the fruit so that it would fit neatly in the can. Cannery workers would then inspect the sliced pineapple to trim away any thing that wouldn't fit in a can. The machine greatly increased the number of pineapples that could be cored in one minute from 15 pineapples to 35. A higher speed machine was later invented that could peel and core 100 pineapples per minute. This revolutionized the fruit canning industry by making pineapple Hawaii's second-largest crop, after sugarcane.
