= Hollis Professor of Divinity =

Harvard University chair endowed in 1721

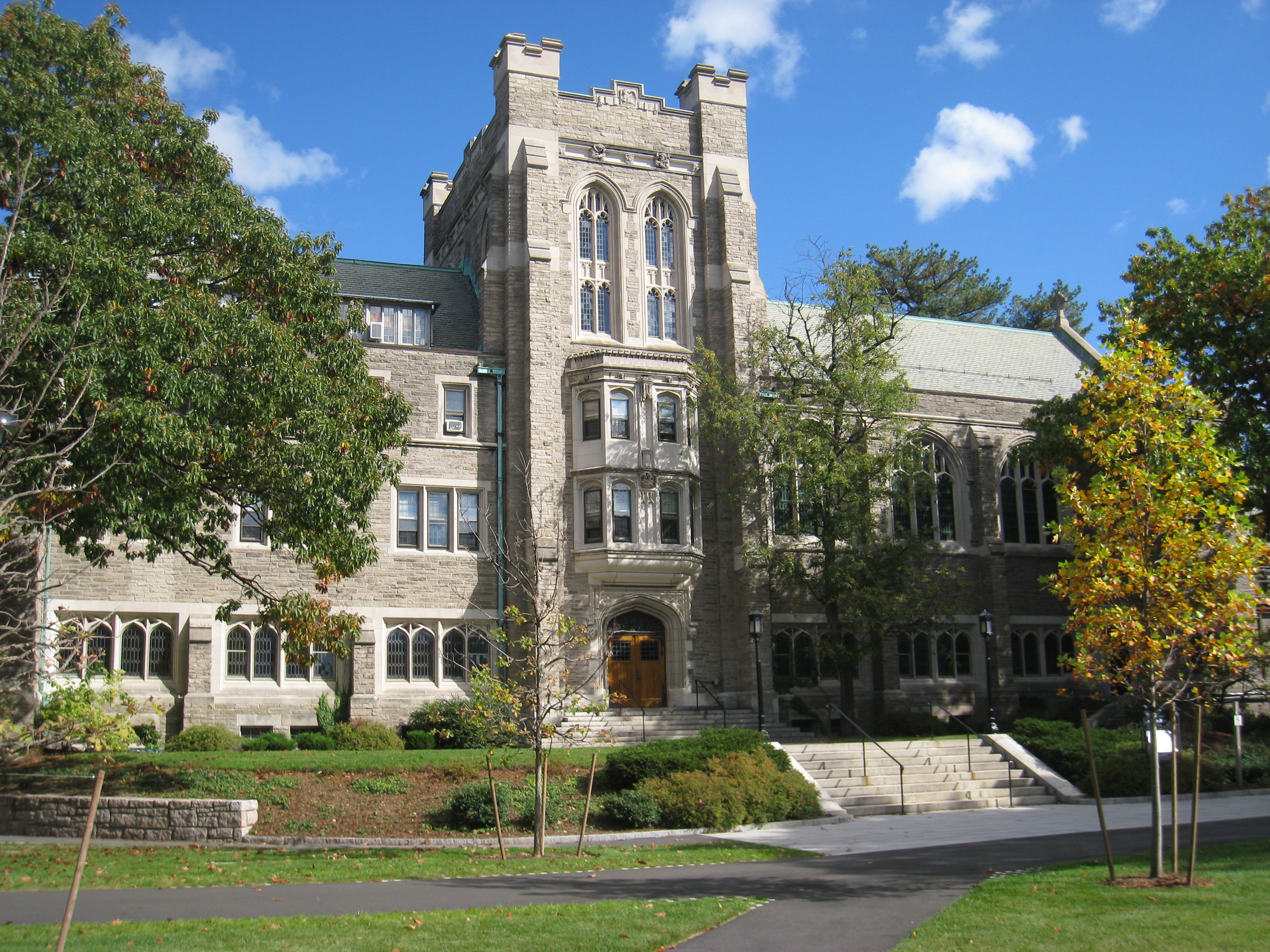
Andover Hall at Harvard Divinity School

The Hollis Chair of Divinity is an endowed chair at Harvard Divinity School. It was established in 1721 at a salary of £80 per year by Thomas Hollis, a wealthy English merchant and benefactor of the university. This chair represents the first professorship in theology in the country, and in the early 19th century it was considered to be "the most prestigious endowed professorship in America".

== History ==
The terms for the new position were drawn up in London on 22 August 1721. Requirements for the professor were not very sectarian, although Hollis made a requirement of character: "That he should be a man of solid learning in divinity, of sound, or orthodox principles, one well gifted to teach, of a sober and pious life, and of a grave conversation." Traditionally, the chair's occupant has the right to graze a cow on the Harvard Yard, but until 2009 none but the first two Hollis professors had done so. In 2009, upon his retirement, theologian Harvey Cox restored the tradition and chose Faith, a Jersey cow belonging to the Farm School in Athol, Massachusetts.

Although Hollis was a Baptist, he had enough faith in the liberal and tolerant atmosphere at Harvard to endow the chair and allow the president and faculty of the university to appoint theologians to the chair, with the condition "that none be refused on account of his belief and practice of adult baptism." Hollis's "sound and orthodox principles" initially meant Congregationalist or Calvinist. The chair's first occupant, Edward Michael Wigglesworth (c. 1693–1765), had to swear allegiance to the Medulla Theologiae, a Calvinist theological manual by William Ames.

The chair was first unoccupied, briefly, from 1803 to 1805, when the Puritans at Harvard ceded power to the Unitarians; in 1805, Unitarian Henry Ware assumed the post. Proponents of the Unitarian faction pointed out that it would be impossible to find a man orthodox enough for the 1720s in the early nineteenth century; "orthodox" they interpreted as following "the general sentiment of the country." In the 1830s, Harvard found itself in financial trouble and at the same time was moving away from the teaching of religion. Josiah Quincy III, then-president of Harvard, refused to nominate a successor for Henry Ware, and the post was left unoccupied a second time. It also seems that the original endowment had dried up. In the meantime, to lessen the possible charge of a "narrowly sectarian education" the chair was moved to the Divinity School, which had been formed in 1816.

== Chairholders and denomination ==
- Edward Wigglesworth (1722–1765); Calvinist Congregationalist
- Edward Wigglesworth (son of the previous occupant; 1765–1792); Calvinist Congregationalist
- David Tappan (1792–1803); Calvinist Congregationalist
- Henry Ware (1805–1840); Unitarian Congregationalist
- David Gordon Lyon (1882–1910); Baptist
- James Hardy Ropes (1910–1933); Trinitarian Congregationalist
- Henry Cadbury (1934–1954); Quaker
- Amos Niven Wilder (1956–1963); Congregationalist
- George Huntston Williams (1963–1980);Unitarian
- Richard Reinhold Niebuhr (1981–1999)
- Harvey Cox (1999–2009); Baptist
- Karen Leigh King (2009– ) Episcopalian
