= Cecil Wigglesworth =

English cricketer and Royal Air Force officer

- Born: 17 October 1893; Tadcaster, Yorkshire, England
- Died: 8 August 1961 (aged 67); Lymington, Hampshire, England
- Military career
- Allegiance: United Kingdom
- Branch: Royal Navy (1915–18); Royal Air Force (1918–49)
- Service years: 1915–1949
- Rank: Air Commodore
- Commands: RAF Iceland (1943–45); RAF Silloth (1940–41); No. 209 Squadron RAF (1939–40); No. 201 Squadron RAF (1933–35)
- Conflicts: First World War; Second World War
- Awards: Companion of the Order of the Bath; Air Force Cross
- Other work: Cricketer

Air Commodore Cecil George Wigglesworth, CB, AFC (17 October 1893 – 8 August 1961) was a Royal Air Force (RAF) officer and cricketer. A right-handed batsman, he played a first-class match for the Royal Air Force against the Royal Navy in August 1927. In 1930, he played for the Straits Settlements against the Federated Malay States in Kuala Lumpur.

In the RAF, Wigglesworth reached the rank of air commodore. By some accounts he was the original of Biggles. He served in Iceland during the Second World War, where one of his fellow officers was the original of Just William.

== See also ==
- Philip Wigglesworth
