= Daniel Dole =

Missionary (1808–1878)

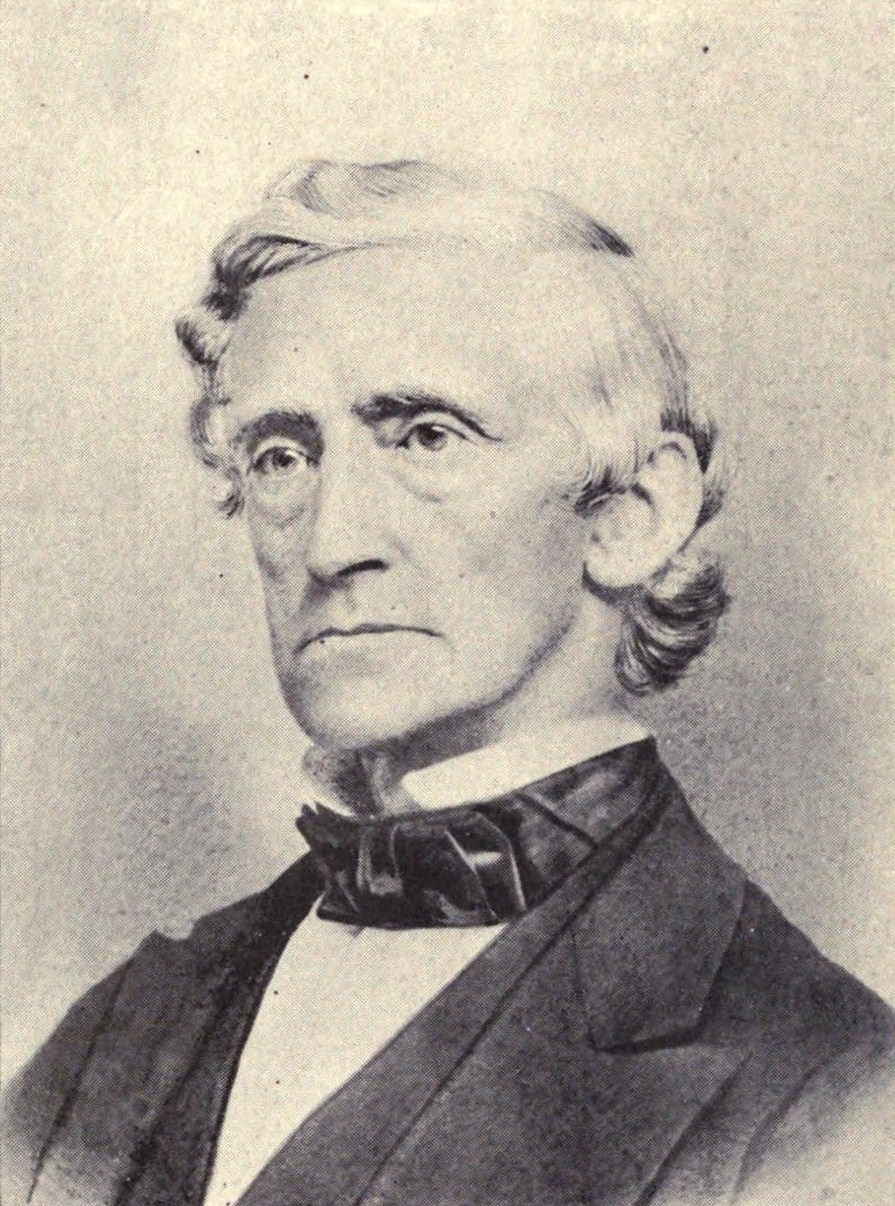
- Born: September 9, 1808; Skowhegan, Maine, U.S.
- Died: August 26, 1878 (aged 69); Kapaʻa, Kauaʻi, Hawaiian Kingdom
- Occupations: Missionary, Teacher
- Known for: Punahou School
- Spouses: Emily Hoyt Ballard; Charlotte Close Knapp
- Children: George Hathaway Dole; Sanford Ballard Dole
- Parent(s): Wigglesworth Dole; Elizabeth Haskell

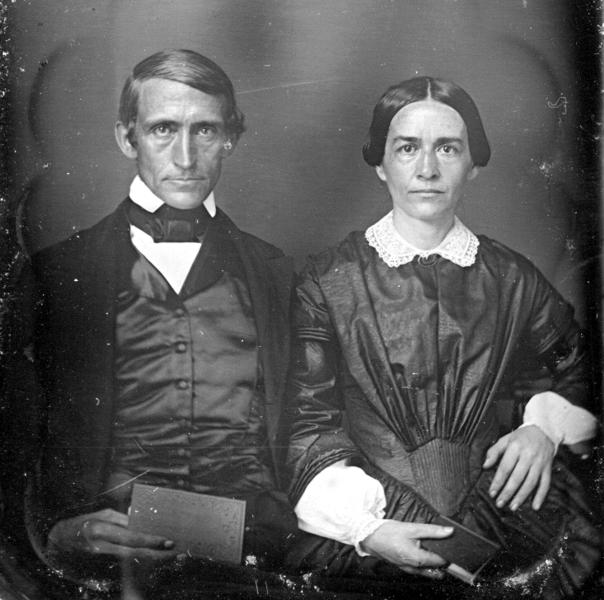
Dole and his second wife Charlotte, c. 1853.

Daniel Dole (September 9, 1808 – August 26, 1878) was a Protestant missionary educator from the United States to the Hawaiian Islands.

== Life ==
Daniel Dole was born September 9, 1808, in Skowhegan, Maine. His father was Wigglesworth Dole (1779–1845) and mother was Elizabeth Haskell. In 1836 he graduated from Bowdoin College, and in 1839 from the Bangor Theological Seminary. On October 2, 1840, he married Emily Hoyt Ballard (1808–1844). They sailed in the ninth company of missionaries to Hawaii from the American Board of Commissioners for Foreign Missions on the ship Gloucester, leaving from Boston on November 14, 1840, and arriving to Honolulu on May 21, 1841. Also in this company were John Davis Paris, Elias Bond, and William Harrison Rice.

Punahou School was just being organized at the time on land given to Hiram Bingham I. Dole, his wife, and Marcia Smith were its first teachers when it opened on July 11, 1842, and Dole became principal as faculty grew. William Harrison Rice and his wife were added in 1844. The school was the first to use the English language to educate children of missionaries instead of the Hawaiian language. After his first wife died from childbirth complications on April 27, 1844, he married Charlotte Close Knapp (1813–1874) in 1846.

Academic politics also grew with the Punahou School's enrollment. Originally intended only for children of missionaries, Dole allowed other non-Hawaiian children to enroll. Dole responded to cutbacks in funding by employing students to grow their own food. By May 23, 1853, the school was re-chartered with the name Oahu College, administered by a board of trustees and in September, Reverend Edward Griffin Beckwith was named president. Dole continued to teach through 1854, and then resigned. The Dole and Rice families moved to Kōloa on the island of Kauaʻi, and started a small boarding school there in 1855. His first students were his two sons and the Rices' daughter Maria. He never learned the Hawaiian language, but conducted services at two small English language churches in the area. He died in his son George's house in Kapaʻa on August 26, 1878. He was buried in what is now the Līhuʻe cemetery.

== Legacy ==
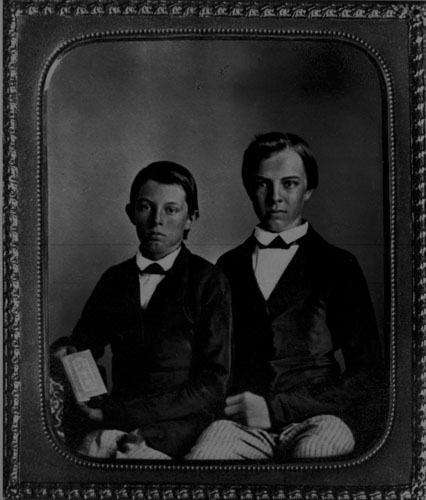
Sons Sanford B. and George H. Dole

His first son, George Hathaway Dole (1842–1912), married Clara Maria Rowell (1847–1916), daughter of missionary Revered George Berkeley Rowell (1815–1884) of Waiʻoli on August 17, 1867, and had 13 children. George became a soldier in the Hawaiian Royal Guard in 1874, and was appointed to the House of Nobles in the legislature of the Hawaiian Kingdom representing Kauaʻi in the 1887 session. In the 1870s he traveled to Salt Lake City, Utah, and met Brigham Young. In 1890 George and his family moved to Riverside, California.

His second son, Sanford Ballard Dole (1844–1926), became a judge, and after the overthrow of the Kingdom of Hawaii president of the Republic of Hawaii and first governor of the Territory of Hawaii. Daniel Dole's second wife was widow of Horton Owen Knapp, whose sister Millicent Knapp (1816–1891) married a missionary doctor, James William Smith (1810–1887). The Smiths' son William Owen Smith would also become very active in politics. George and Sanford were both buried in the cemetery at Kawaiahaʻo Church near the Mission Houses Museum.

Oahu College changed its name back to Punahou School in 1934, and had many influential alumni through the years, including US President Barack Obama.
