= Edward Wigglesworth (1732–1794) =

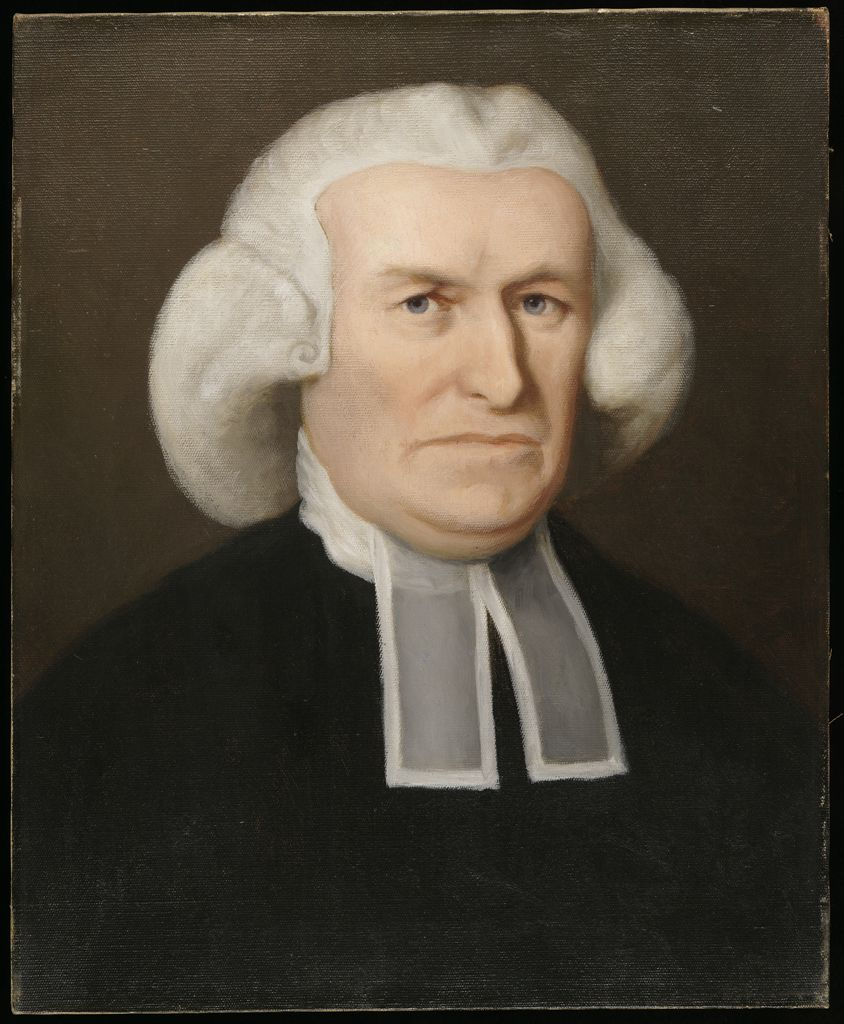
- Born: 1732
- Died: 1794
- Education: Harvard University
- Occupations: Theologian; university teacher
- Employer: Harvard University
- Spouse: Margaret Hill
- Children: Thomas Wigglesworth
- Parents: Edward Michael Wigglesworth (father); Rebecca Coolidge (mother)
- Awards: Fellow of the American Academy of Arts and Sciences (1780–)

Edward Wigglesworth (1732–1794), the son of Edward Michael Wigglesworth (c. 1693–1765), occupied the Hollis Chair of divinity at the Harvard Divinity School from 1765 to 1792. His father had been the first to hold that position. He was the acting President of Harvard from 1780 to 1781.

Wigglesworth graduated from Harvard College in 1749. He was a charter member of the American Academy of Arts and Sciences (1780).

== Archives and records ==
- Edward Wigglesworth business records at Baker Library Special Collections, Harvard Business School.
