= Philip Wigglesworth =

Royal Air Force Air Marshal (1896–1975)

Sir Philip Wigglesworth
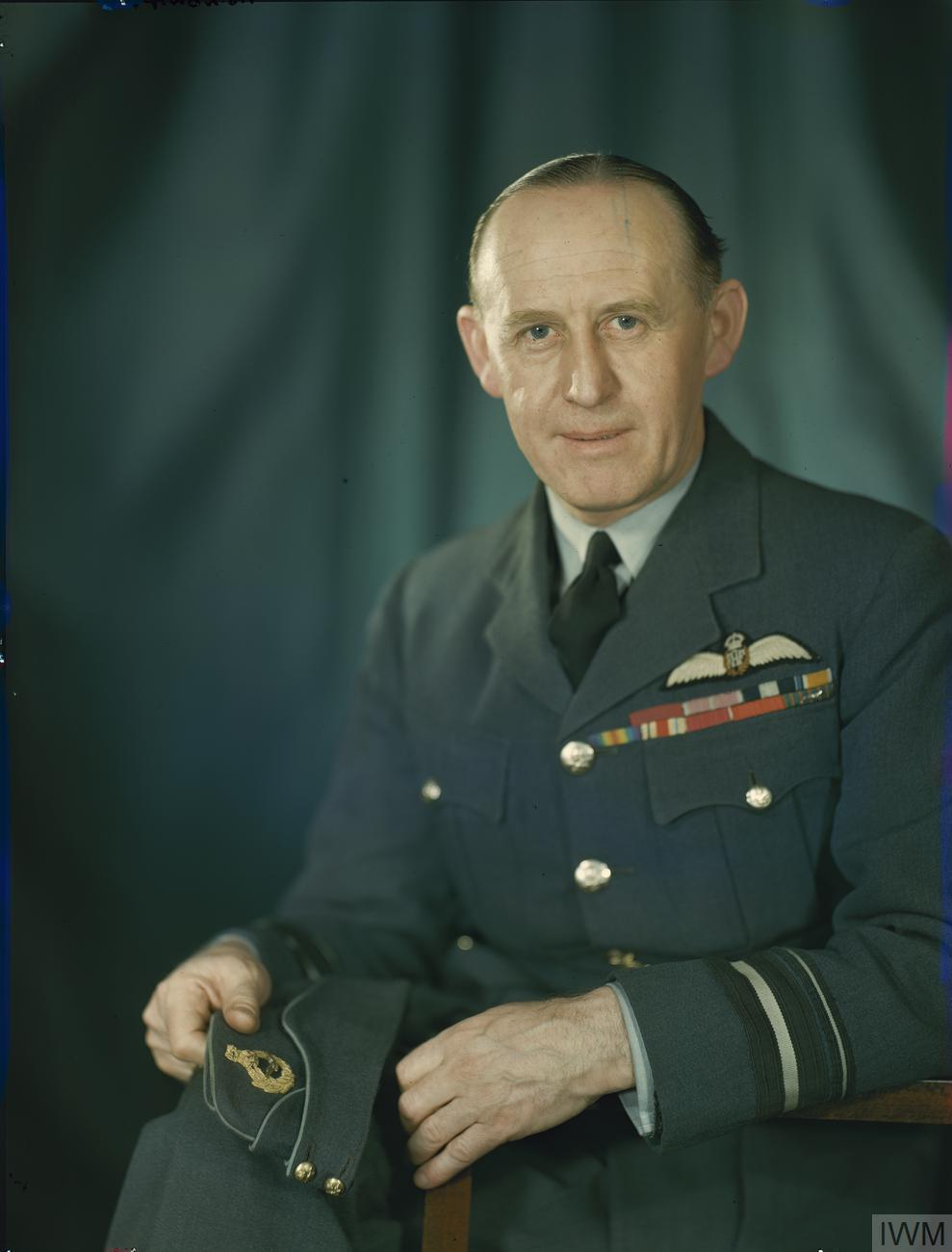
- Air Marshal Wigglesworth as the Deputy Chief of Staff (Air), SHAEF, in c. 1944–45.
- Born: 11 July 1896
- Died: 31 May 1975 (aged 78)
- Military career
- Allegiance: United Kingdom
- Branch: Royal Navy (1915–18); Royal Air Force (1918–48)
- Service years: 1915–1948
- Rank: Air Marshal
- Commands: British Air Forces of Occupation (1946–48); AHQ East Africa (1942); Irish Flight (1922)
- Conflicts: First World War; Second World War
- Awards: Knight Commander of the Order of the British Empire; Companion of the Order of the Bath; Distinguished Service Cross; Mentioned in Despatches (3); Commander of the Legion of Honour (France); Croix de Guerre (France); Commander of the Legion of Merit (United States); Commander of the Royal Order of George I (Greece)

Air Marshal Sir Horace Ernest Philip Wigglesworth, KBE, CB, DSC (11 July 1896 – 31 May 1975) was a senior officer in the Royal Air Force.

== RAF career ==
Educated at Chesterfield Grammar School, Wigglesworth joined the Royal Naval Air Service, a precursor of the Royal Air Force, in 1915, flying both fighters and bombers. His actions during an aerial battle on 23 January 1917 resulted in a Distinguished Service Cross for "conspicuous gallantry and enterprise": he suffered serious frostbite in that action.

Wigglesworth served in the Second World War as head of the Combined Planning Staff at Headquarters Middle East Command, as Senior Air Staff Officer at Headquarters RAF Middle East and then as Air Officer Commanding AHQ East Africa. He became Deputy Air Commander-in-Chief at Mediterranean Air Command in 1943 and Deputy Chief of Staff (Air) at SHAEF in 1944. After the War he was commander of the British Air Forces of Occupation from 1946 to 1948 when he retired.

Wigglesworth was appointed a Knight Commander of the Order of the British Empire in the 1946 New Year Honours. He later became President of the Old Cestrefeldian Society.

== See also ==
- Cecil Wigglesworth

Military offices
Preceded by Sir Sholto Douglas	Commander-in-Chief British Air Forces of Occupation; 1946–1948	Succeeded by Sir Thomas Williams
