= Edward Michael Wigglesworth =

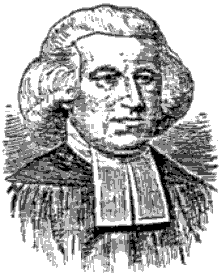
- Born: 1691 or 1692; Cambridge, Massachusetts
- Died: January 16, 1765 (aged 73); Cambridge, Massachusetts
- Education: Harvard College
- Occupations: Clergyman, teacher
- Spouses: Sarah Leverett (m. 1726; died 1727) Rebecca Coolidge (m. 1729; died 1754)
- Children: 3, including Edward Wigglesworth

Edward Michael Wigglesworth (1691/1692 – 1765) was a clergyman, teacher and theologian in Colonial America. His father was clergyman and author Michael Wigglesworth (1631–1705).

== Life ==
Edward Wigglesworth was born in Cambridge, Massachusetts. He graduated Harvard College in 1710, and in 1722 he was appointed to the newly created Hollis Chair, thereby becoming the first divinity professor commissioned in the American colonies. He was made a Doctor of Divinity in 1730; he died in Cambridge on January 16, 1765, at age 73 after holding the chair for more than 42 years. From 1733 to 1756, Wigglesworth was recorded as owning a slave named Hannibal.

He married, first, Sarah Leverett, daughter of Harvard College President John Leverett, in 1726; she died without issue in 1727, and was buried in her father's crypt (her stone, by the Lamson shop, is inset into the side). He married his second wife, Rebecca Coolidge (who died in 1754) in 1729. Their children were Rebecca Wigglesworth (1730–1783) who married Stephen Sewall (1734-1804) who was also an educator; Edward Wigglesworth (1732–1794) who became the next Hollis professor at Harvard; Mary Wigglesworth (1735–1758); and Sybil Wigglesworth (1736–1740). His son Edward had a son also named Edward (Stephen) Wigglesworth (1771-1794), and a son Thomas Wigglesworth (1775–1855) who had son also named Edward Wigglesworth (1804–1876).

His grandfather Edward Wigglesworth was buried at the Phipps Street Burying Ground located in the neighborhood of Charlestown in Boston, Massachusetts, where the family first landed on arrival from Old England. His father Rev. Michael, the poet, is buried in Malden. He is buried in a crypt in the Old Cambridge burying ground in Cambridge; his grandson Stephen Sewall (d. 1768, Ae. S. 11 mo.) is buried in the same tomb.

== See also ==
- North America
- The United States of America
