= Charles Fletcher Dole =

American religious leader, theologian, and author (1845-1927)

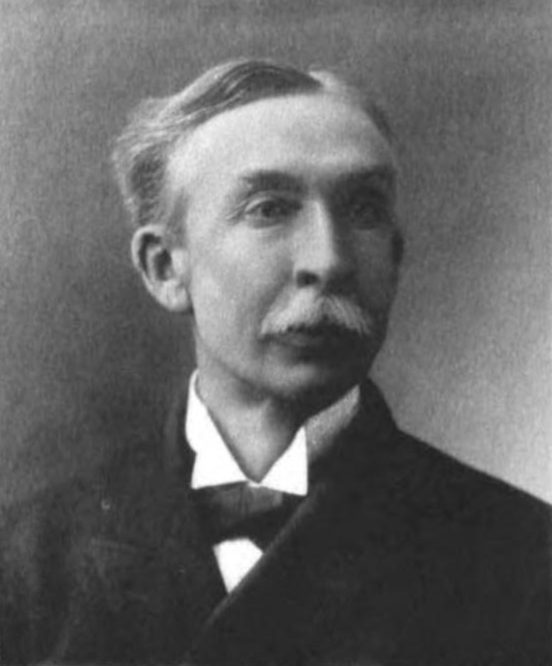
- c. 1908
- Born: May 17, 1845; Brewer, Maine
- Died: November 27, 1927 (aged 82); Boston, Massachusetts
- Education: Harvard University; Andover Theological Seminary; Bowdoin College
- Occupation: Clergyman
- Spouse: Frances Drummond (m. 1873)

Charles Fletcher Dole (1845–1927) was a Unitarian minister, speaker, and writer in the Jamaica Plain section of Boston, Massachusetts, and Chairman of the Association to Abolish War. He authored a substantial number of books on politics, history, and theology.

== Life ==
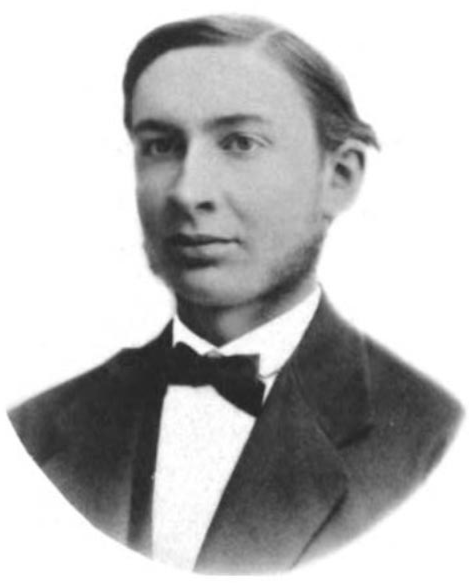
At Harvard, c. 1868

Dole was born May 17, 1845, in Brewer, Maine. He was the son of Reverend Nathan Dole (1811–1855) and Caroline Fletcher Dole (1817–1914) and the older brother of Nathan Haskell Dole (1852–1935). He received a Bachelor of Arts from Harvard University in 1868 and a Masters of Arts in 1870. He graduated from Andover Theological Seminary in 1872 and married Frances Drummond of Springfield, Massachusetts, on March 4, 1873. He was a professor of Greek at the University of Vermont in 1873, a minister at Plymouth Church in Portland, Maine, from 1874 to 1876. He was a member of the American Peace Society, the Anti-Imperialist League, 20th Century, Appalachian, etc. He got a Doctorate in Divinity from Bowdoin College in 1906.

Dole became an influential Unitarian minister and began in 1876 as the associate and took over as the settled minister in 1880 of the First Congregational Society of Jamaica Plain - Unitarian. He served for forty years until 1916, when he was named minister emeritus.

He also served on the board of Trustees for Tuskegee Institute in Tuskegee, Alabama.

His son James Drummond Dole moved to the Territory of Hawaii in 1899 to establish a pineapple-growing empire, which would eventually become the Dole Food Company. At first, he lived with cousin Sanford Ballard Dole (1844–1926), who was the territorial governor.

Dole himself moved to Hawaii in 1909, where he was welcomed by the conservative community despite his progressive views. He died at his home in Jamaica Plain on November 27, 1927.

== Publications ==
- The Citizen and the Neighbor (1884)
- Early Hebrew Stories (1886)
- Jesus and the Men About Him (1888)
- A Hand-book of Temperance (1888)
- The American Citizen (1892)
- —— (1989) [First published 1984]. The Citizen and the Neighbor (6th ed.). Boston, MA: Unitarian Sunday-School Society. hdl:2027/nyp.33433081941555. OCLC 681714872.
- A Catechism of Liberal Faith (1895)
- The Golden Rule in Business (1896)
- —— (1897) [First published 1896]. The Citizen's Catechism. "Our country" series. New York, NY: Patriotic League. OCLC 680422007.
- —— (1897). The Coming People. New York, Boston: Thomas Y. Crowell Co. OCLC 586592702 – via Internet Archive.
- —— (1898). Luxury and Sacrifice. New York, Boston: Thomas Y. Crowell Co. OCLC 609210196.
- —— (1899). The Young Citizen. Boston, MA: D. C. Heath and Company. OCLC 610384853 – via Internet Archive.
- —— (1899). The American Patriot. "Our country" series. New York, NY: Patriotic League. OCLC 680965916.
- The Theology of Civilization (1899)
- The Problem of Duty: A Study of the Philosophy of Conduct (1900)
- The Religion of a Gentleman (1900)
- Noble Womanhood (1900)
- The Smoke and the Flame: A Study in the Development of Religion (1902)
- From Agnosticism to Theism (1903)
- The Theology of Civilization (1905)
- The Spirit of Democracy (1906)
- The Hope of Immortality: Our Reasons for it (1908, the Ingersoll lecture for 1906)
- What we know about Jesus (1908)
- The Ethics of Progress (1909)
- The Coming Religion (1910)
- The Burden of Poverty (1912)
- The Right and Wrong of the Monroe Doctrine (1912)
- The New American Citizen: The Essentials of Civics and Economics (1918)
- A Religion for the New Day (1920)
- Economics for Upper Grades (1920)
- The Victorious Goodness: An Epic of Spiritual Journey (1927)
- My eighty years. E.P. Dutton & company. 1927.
