= Michael Wigglesworth =

American puritan minister and poet

- Born: October 18, 1631; Yorkshire, England
- Died: June 10, 1705 (aged 73); Malden, Province of Massachusetts Bay
- Education: Harvard College
- Era: Colonial Period
- Notable work: Day of Doom

Michael Wigglesworth (1631–1705) was a Puritan minister, physician, and poet whose poem The Day of Doom was a bestseller in early New England.

== Family ==
Michael Wigglesworth was born October 18, 1631, in Yorkshire, England. His father was Edward Wigglesworth, born 1603 in Scotton, Lincolnshire, and his mother was Ester Middlebrook of Wrawby (born in Batley), who married on October 27, 1629, in Wrawby. The family moved to New England in 1638. They originally lived in Charlestown, Massachusetts, then soon moved to New Haven, Connecticut. When Wigglesworth was ten years old his father became bed-ridden, forcing him to leave school to help maintain the family farm.

He graduated from Harvard in 1651 and taught there as a tutor until 1654, sometimes preaching in Charlestown and Malden, Massachusetts. He became a minister at the First Parish in Malden in 1654 but was not actually ordained until 1656.

A daughter Mercy Wigglesworth was born February 21, 1655. With his second wife he had six children, including Samuel Wigglesworth born c. 1689. His youngest son, with his third wife, Sybil (Avery) Sparhawk, was clergyman Edward Michael Wigglesworth (c. 1693–1765), who had several namesakes. His son, Samuel, had 12 children, including one also named Edward Wigglesworth (1741–1826) who was a colonel in the American Revolutionary War.

== Work ==
Wigglesworth believed that he was essentially not worthy of believing in God as a result of his depraved humanity. When he underwent a series of nocturnal emissions in his early life, he was thereafter convinced of his damnation. Through his diaries, he recounts his struggle to remain pure and good, despite continually relapsing into what he viewed as man's natural depravity.

At one point, Wigglesworth was overcome with a psychosomatic disorder in which he felt he should not preach. His confused and disappointed congregation elected to find a replacement for Wigglesworth, an unnamed preacher who went on to embezzle funds from the church. Thereafter, Wigglesworth was reinstated and encouraged to take up preaching again.

In his diaries, Wigglesworth expressed an overwhelming sense of inferiority, shown in his refusal to accept the presidency of Harvard due to lack of self-confidence, and again when he married his cousin because, he claimed he was not good enough to find another woman.

Wigglesworth was plagued by his attraction to his male students, many of whom were his close contemporaries in age. The passages in his diary about these attractions are written in a secret code, allowing him to be explicit about his feelings and his fears.

On April 5, 1653, Wigglesworth wrote, "I find my spirit so exceedingly carried with love to my pupils that I can't tell how to take up my rest in God." On July 4, 1653, he struggled with "filthy lust" inspired by "my fond affection for my students while in their presence." Wigglesworth married in 1655, but his attraction to men continued. The day after his marriage Wigglesworth confessed to his diary: "I feel stirrings and strongly of my former distemper even after the use of marriage --which makes me exceeding afraid."

Yet he was widowed twice, and married a third time: Mary Reyner in 1655, Martha Mudge in 1679 and Sybil (Avery) Spearhawk in 1691.

In 1662 he published The Day of Doom or a Poetical Description of the Great and Last Judgment, a "doggerel epitome of Calvinistic theology", according to a later anthology, Colonial Prose and Poetry (1903), that says it "attained immediately a phenomenal popularity. Eighteen hundred copies were sold within a year, and for the next century it held a secure place in New England Puritan households. As late as 1828 it was stated that "many aged persons were still alive who could repeat it, as it had been taught them with their catechism; and the more widely one reads in the voluminous sermons of that generation, the more fair will its representation of prevailing theology in New England appear." A less polemic analysis of the work might also show its rich use of dramatic imagery, combining a number of references from both Hebrew and Christian scriptures, and note the interlocked complexity of its double-rhymed octasina (8-syllable) lines.

Despite the fierce denunciations of sinners and the terrible images of damnation in The Day of Doom, its author was known as a "genial philanthropist, so cheerful that some of his friends thought he could not be so sick as he averred. Dr. Peabody used to call him 'a man of the beatitudes', ministering not alone to the spiritual but to the physical needs of his flock, having studied medicine for that purpose," according to Colonial Prose and Poetry.

Other works by Wigglesworth include God's Controversy with New England, Meat out of the Eater, and "God's Controversy with New England," (1662). The latter poem was unpublished, yet provides a lengthy commentary on the fears of Puritans that they would be stricken by God for their sin, and persecuted by House of Stuart.

== Salem Witchcraft Trials and Accountability ==
=== Cambridge Association ===
Rev. Wigglesworth was among the area ministers invited to join the Cambridge Association when it formed in 1690, organized by the twenty-seven-year-old Rev. Cotton Mather and the elder Rev. Charles Morton. The first order of business was to respond to a letter from the minister at Salem Village, Rev. Samuel Parris, and invite him to come down to meet with them a week later in the college library in Cambridge (see photo).

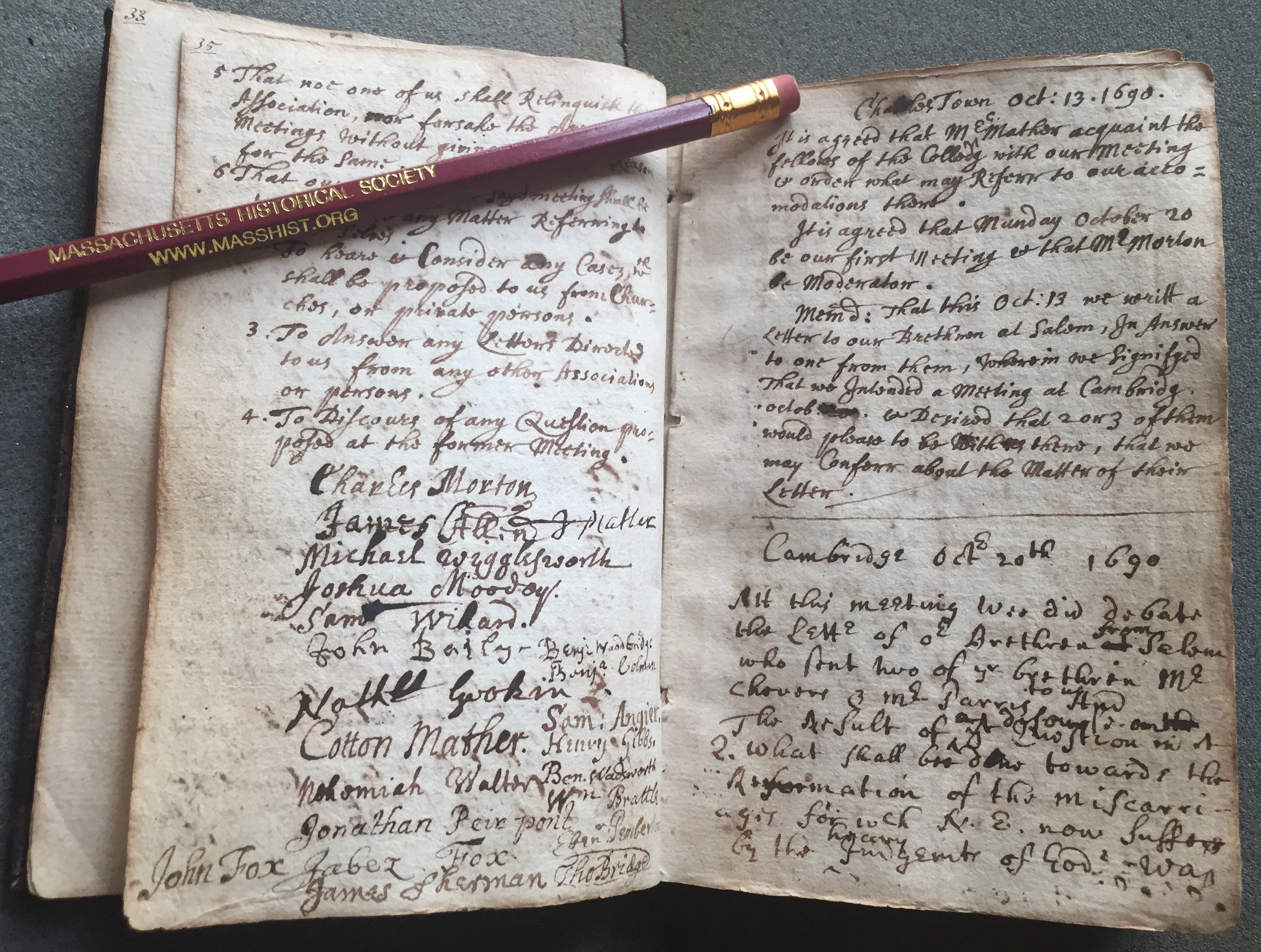
When they joined, ministers signed the book.

During the witchcraft trials in 1692, this group of ministers met often in the library and were solicited for advice regarding witchcraft doctrine. Wigglesworth was in attendance at a number of meetings that year but is not recorded as having had much to say. His famous poem "Day of Doom" published some 30 years prior has only one brief mention of the word "witch." Unlike the Mathers, witchcraft does not appear to have been a subject of great interest to him.

On October 3, 1692, Wigglesworth signed his name to Rev. Samuel Willard's short and forceful introduction ("It is therefore exceeding necessary that in such a day as this, men be informed what is evidence and what is not.") of Increase Mather's essay "Cases Concerning Evil Spirits." Increase Mather himself does not appear to have been in attendance at this meeting and his son Cotton Mather famously refused to sign Willard's introduction.

After the trials were ended, churchmembers in Salem Village who had suffered, or lost loved ones, sought a Church Council to hear grievances against their pastor Parris and they were supported in this effort by Willard. Parris stalled for as long as he could and then sought allies, writing to the Mathers, and also inviting Wigglesworth through his church at Malden. It is unclear why Parris would have considered Wigglesworth a possible ally. In any event, Wigglesworth did not attend the Council which took place April 3, 1695.

=== To Leave My Testimony ===
Finally, feeling that he was near the end of his life, on July 22, 1704, Wigglesworth was compelled "to leave my testimony before I leave the world" and he wrote a passionate letter to Increase Mather which directly addresses the minister's culpability in the events of 1692:

Rev. and Dear Sir, I am right well assured that both yourself, your son, and the rest of our brethren with you in Boston, have a deep sense upon your spirits of the awful symptoms of the Divine displeasure that we lie under at this day...give me leave to impart some of my serious and solemn thoughts. I fear (amongst our many other provocations) that God hath a controversy with us about what was done in the time of the Witchcraft. I fear that innocent blood hath been shed, and that many have had their hands defiled therewith... Paul, a Pharisee, persecuted the Church of God, shed the blood of God's Saints, and yet obtained mercy, because he did it in ignorance; but how doth he bewail it, and shame himself for it, before God and men afterwards. I think, and am verily persuaded, God expects that we do the like, in order to our obtaining his pardon: I mean by a Public and Solemn acknowledgment of it and humiliation for it [emphasis added]; and the more particularly and personally it is done by all that have been actors, the more pleasing it will be to God... the whole country lies under a curse... til some effectual course is taken by our honored Governor and General Court to make amends and reparation [to the families of those condemned] for supposed witchcraft [and those] ruined by taking away and making havoc of their estates... I have with a weak body and trembling hand, endeavored to leave my testimony before I leave the world.

Wigglesworth also went a step further in exhorting Increase Mather to express a statement of contrition "to the Rev. Samuel Willard." Increase Mather had lost the presidency of the college to Willard in 1701 and retained a great bitterness about it at this time.

=== The Mathers' Oblique Response ===
There seems to be no record of a direct response from the Mathers, but judging from their past reactions (see controversy over formation of Brattle Square church, etc.) it is unlikely they would have taken Wigglesworth's criticisms lightly. Wigglesworth had been astute in believing the end of his life was near and he died within a year (June 10, 1705) of writing the letter. The Mathers quickly began to assert themselves relative to their fellow pastor's posthumous legacy. Cotton Mather gained access to his diary and private papers and quoted from them in a sermon preached at Malden on June 24, 1705. The Mathers had this sermon printed in Boston and a copy was signed by Increase Mather and sent to the church at Malden.

== Death ==
Wigglesworth died June 10, 1705, in Malden, Middlesex County. The epitaph on his grave in Bell Rock Cemetery says:

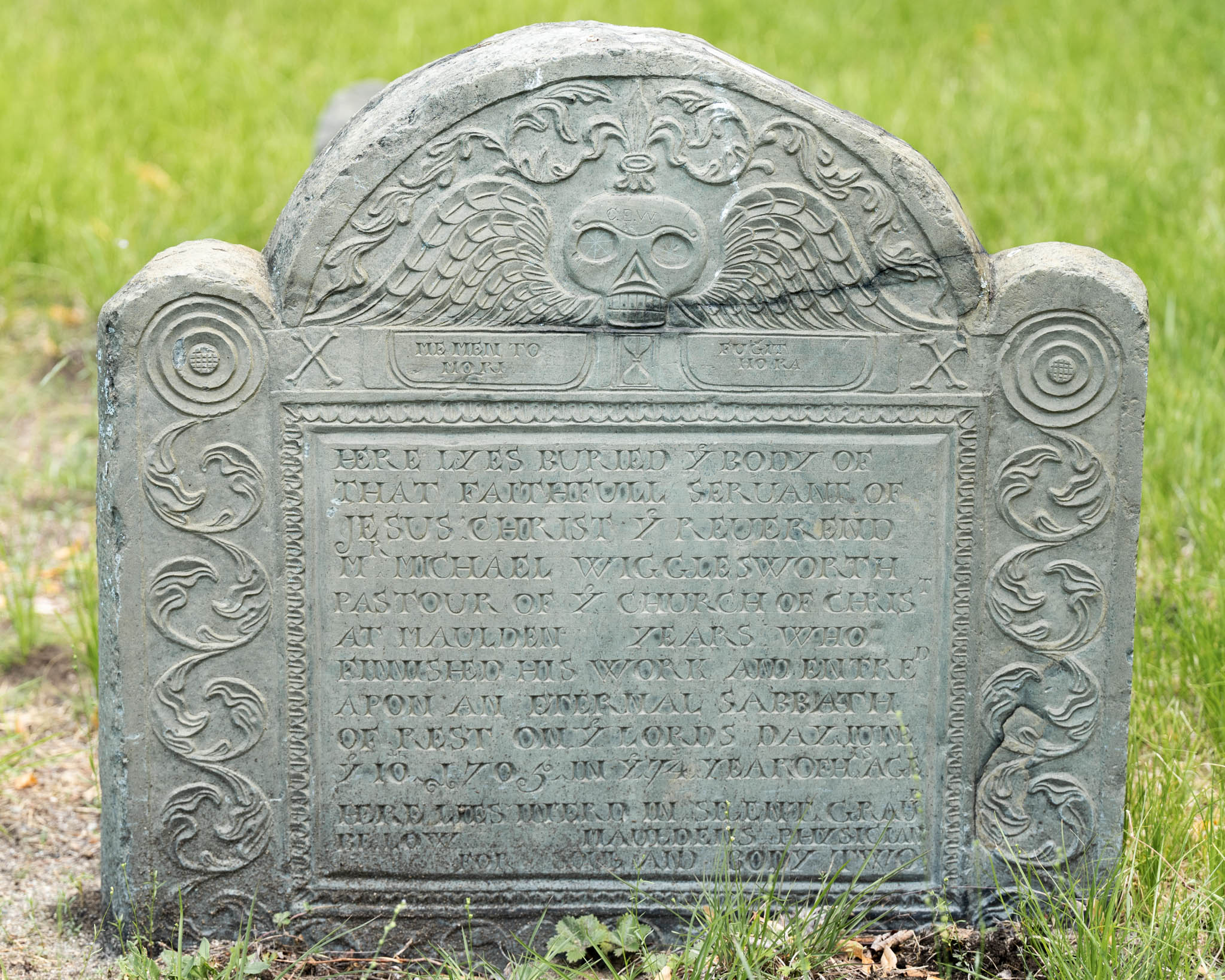
The headstone of Michael Wigglesworth.

HERE LYES BURIED Ye BODY OF
THAT FAITHFUL SERVANT OF
JESUS CHRIST Ye REVEREND
MR. MICHAEL WIGGLESWORTH
PASTOUR OF Ye CHURCH OF CHRIST
AT MAULDEN , < > YEARS WHO
FINISHED HIS WORK AND ENTERED
APON AN ETERNAL SABBATH
OF REST ON Ye LORD’S DAY JUNE
Ye 10 1705 IN Ye 74TH YEAR OF HIS AGE.
HERE LIES INTERRED IN SILENT GRAVE
BELOW MAULDEN’S PHYSITIAN FOR SOUL AND BODY TWO.

An encomium to his memory says,

His pen did once Meat from the Eater take
And now he's gone beyond the Eater's reach
His body once so thin was next to none
From hence he's to unbodied spirits flown.
Once his rare skill did all diseases heal
And he doth nothing now uneasy feel.
He to his paradise is joyful come
And waits with joy to see his Day of Doom.

== See also ==
- Benjamin Tompson, Puritan New England poet and contemporary of Wigglesworth
- Early American publishers and printers
