= Mary Tenney Castle =

American philanthropist (1819–1907)

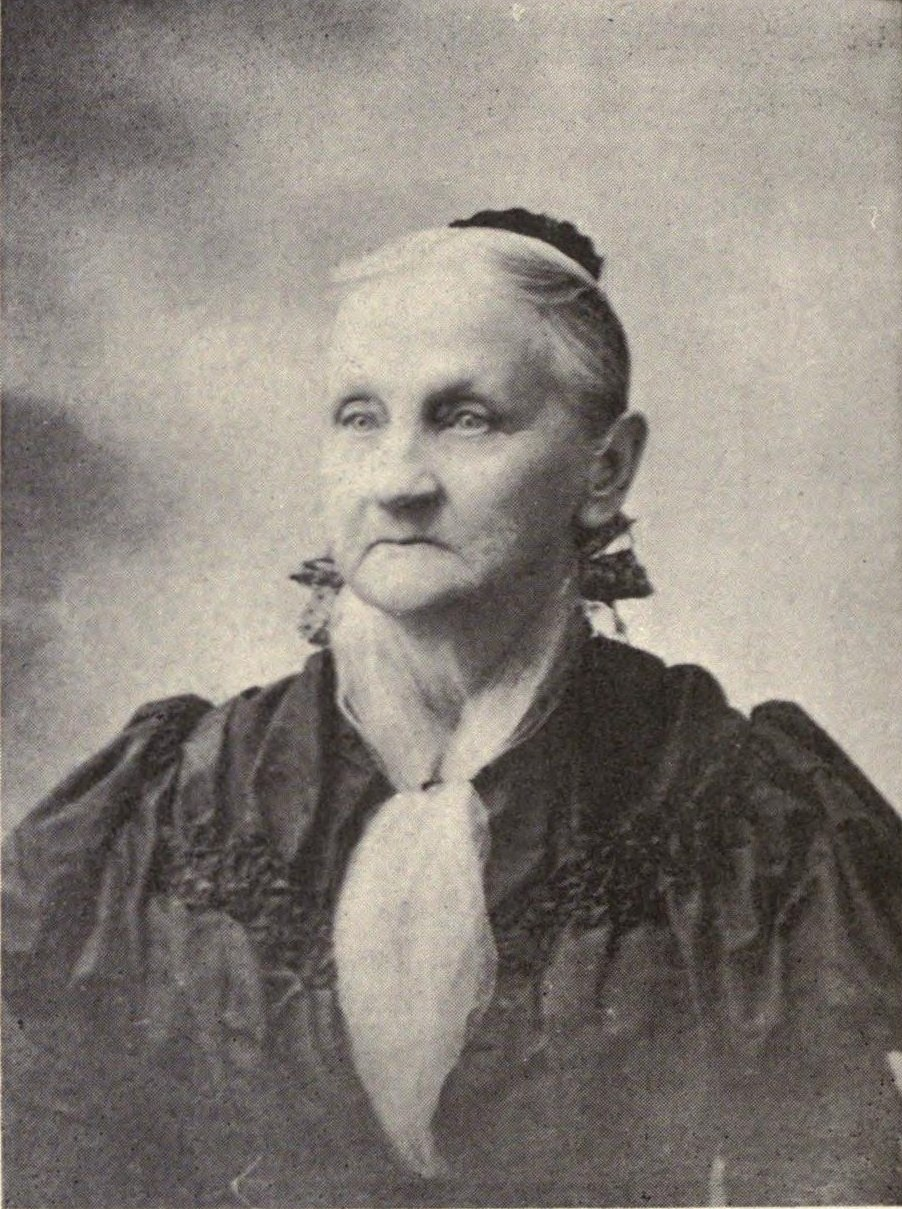
Mary Tenney Castle

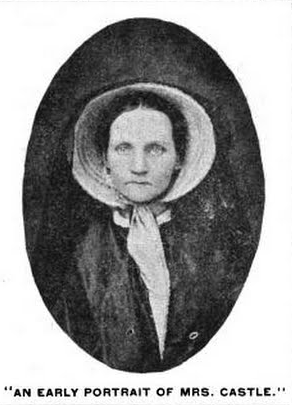
Mary Tenney Castle as a young woman, from a 1907 publication.

Mary Tenney Castle (October 26, 1819 — March 13, 1907), known as Mother Castle, was an American missionary and philanthropist in the Hawaiian Islands.

== Early life ==
Mary Ann Tenney was born in Plainfield, New York, the daughter of Levi Tenney and Mary Kingsbury Tenney. She attended Deerfield Academy in Massachusetts.

== In Hawaii ==
Mary Tenney arrived in Hawaii as a new bride in 1843. She raised her niece, Mary, and had nine more Castle children, all born in Hawaii between 1844 and 1862. She was known as "Mother Castle". She was interested in progressive education, with advice from John Dewey, a family friend. "Mother Castle lived with a serenity and cheerfulness that made her home a Mecca to all visitors interested in the better side of Hawaiian life," recalled one obituary in 1907.

In widowhood, she set up the Samuel N. Castle Memorial Trust, to fund educational scholarships, health programs, and building projects in Honolulu. Her gift of $10,000 started the Free Kindergarten and Children's Aid Society of the Hawaiian Islands in 1895. The trust is now the Samuel N. and Mary Castle Foundation.

== Personal life and legacy ==
Mary Tenney married her late sister Angeline's widower, Samuel Northrup Castle, in 1842. She outlived three of her children: her son Albert died as a boy in 1864, and her son Charles died in 1874. Another son, Henry, died in 1895. She was widowed when Samuel died in 1894. Mary Tenney Castle died in 1907, at "Pu'uhonua", her home in the Manoa Valley, aged 87 years. Some of her manuscript letters are reproduced online in the Hawaiian Mission Houses Digital Archives. The Castle Foundation Papers are in the Hawaiian Mission Houses Archives.

The Mary Tenney Castle Memorial Graduate Fellowship at the University of Hawaii at Manoa funds students interested in early childhood education. The Samuel and Mary Castle Art Center at Punahou School is named for the Castles, as is a building at the University of Hawaii.

She was mother-in-law to psychologist George Herbert Mead and businessman William Drake Westervelt. Descendants of Mary Tenney Castle included her sons William Richards Castle, a lawyer, and James Bicknell Castle, a businessman; and grandsons Harold Kainalu Long Castle and William Richards Castle Jr.

=== Family tree ===
Castle Hawaii family tree

Angeline Lorraine Tenney (1810–1841)	Samuel Northrup Castle (1808–1894)	Mary Tenney (1819–1907)
Edward G. Hitchcock (1837–1898)	Mary Tenney Castle (1838–1926)
William Richards Castle (1849–1935)	James Bicknell Castle (1855–1918)	William Drake Westervelt (1849–1939)	Caroline Dickinson Castle (1859–1941)	George Herbert Mead (1863–1931)	Helen Kingsbury Castle (1860–1929)
William Richards Castle, Jr. (1878–1963)	Harold Kainalu Long Castle (1886-1967)
