= Harold Kainalu Long Castle =

American landowner and philanthropist (1886–1967)

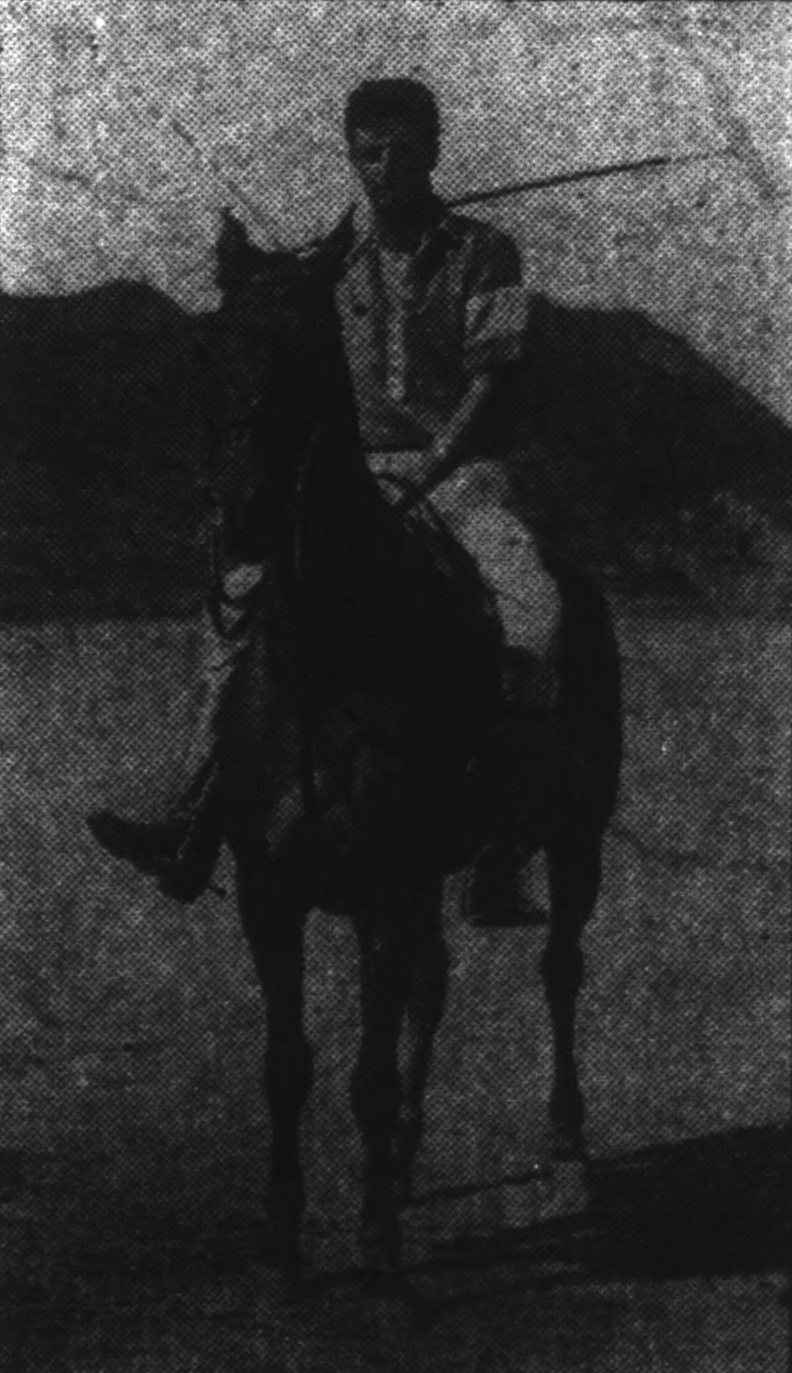
- Harold Kainalu Long Castle playing polo, 1914
- Born: July 3, 1886; Honolulu, Hawaii, Kingdom of Hawai'i
- Died: August 19, 1967 (aged 81); Kailua, Honolulu County, Hawaii, US

Harold Kainalu Long Castle (July 3, 1886 – August 19, 1967) was a landowner, real estate developer, and later a philanthropist in Hawaii.

== Life ==
Harold Kainalu Long Castle was born July 3, 1886, in Honolulu. Castle was the son of wealthy landowner James Bicknell Castle and Julia White, and grandson of Castle & Cooke founder Samuel Northrup Castle and philanthropist Mary Tenney Castle. In 1917, he purchased almost 10,000 acres (40 km^{2}) of land on the windward side of the island of Oahu, in what was then the ahupuaʻa of Kailua, to establish his sprawling Kaneohe Ranch.

In 1962, he set up the Harold K.L. Castle Foundation, which remains the largest private foundation based in Hawaiʻi. He and his foundation have donated large amounts of land to educational and other public institutions, including Hawaii Loa College, ʻIolani School, Castle High School, Kainalu Elementary School, Castle Medical Center, and the Mokapu peninsula land that became Marine Corps Base Hawaii.

He and his wife, Alice Hedemann, both graduated from Punahou School; he served on its Board of Trustees (1922–1937), and their descendants have continued to attend and support the school.

Plantation Estate, his home in Kailua, Honolulu County, Hawaii, was used by Barack Obama as a Winter White House during Christmas vacations in 2008, 2009, and 2010.

=== Family tree ===
Castle Hawaii family tree

Angeline Lorraine Tenney (1810–1841)	Samuel Northrup Castle (1808–1894)	Mary Tenney (1819–1907)
Edward G. Hitchcock (1837–1898)	Mary Tenney Castle (1838–1926)
William Richards Castle (1849–1935)	James Bicknell Castle (1855–1918)	William Drake Westervelt (1849–1939)	Caroline Dickinson Castle (1859–1941)	George Herbert Mead (1863–1931)	Helen Kingsbury Castle (1860–1929)
William Richards Castle, Jr. (1878–1963)	Harold Kainalu Long Castle (1886-1967)

== See also ==
- Kaneohe Ranch
- Harold K.L. Castle Foundation
- James B. Castle High School
- Hawaii Loa College
- Kawai Nui Marsh
