= D. Howard Hitchcock =

American painter (1861–1943)

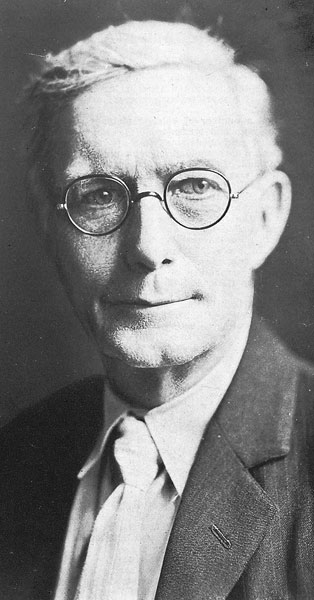
- Born: David Howard Hitchcock; May 15, 1861; Hilo, Hawaii
- Died: January 1, 1943 (aged 81); Honolulu
- Education: Jules Tavernier
- Known for: Painting, Impressionist
- Children: 3

David Howard Hitchcock (May 15, 1861 – January 1, 1943) was an American painter of the Volcano School, known for his depictions of Hawaii.

== Life ==
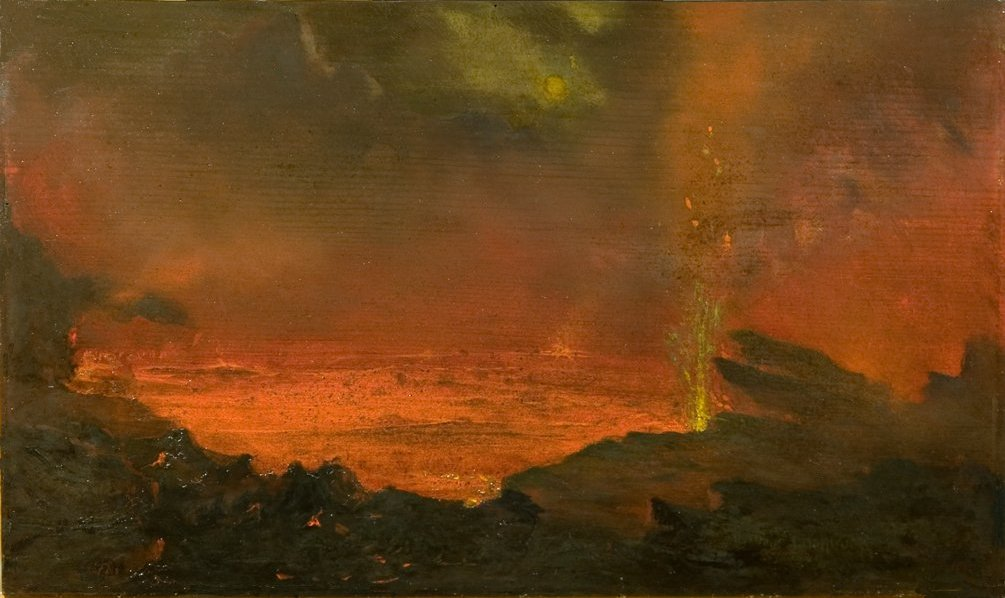
David Howard Hitchcock's oil painting 'Halemaumau, Lake of Fire', 1888.

David Howard Hitchcock was born May 15, 1861, in Hilo, Hawaii. Since his father was also named David Howard Hitchcock (1831–1899), he generally went by D. Howard Hitchcock. His mother was Almeda Eliza Widger (1828–1895). His paternal grandparents were missionaries Harvey Rexford Hitchcock (1800–1855) and Rebecca Howard (1808–1890). His father was a lawyer who served in the legislature of the Hawaiian Kingdom, and his sister Almeda Eliza Hitchcock Moore (1863–1895) was the first woman lawyer in Hawaii. His uncle Edward Griffin Hitchcock (1837–1898) married Mary Tenney Castle, daughter of Castle & Cooke founder Samuel Northrup Castle. His cousin once removed (Edward Griffin's grandson) was football player Harvey Rexford Hitchcock Jr.

After graduating from Punahou School, Hitchcock attended Oberlin College in Ohio, where he saw his first art exhibition. Back in Hawaii, he wandered the volcano wilderness with a sketch pad and watercolors. French artist Jules Tavernier, painting in Hawaii, saw Hitchcock's sketches and convinced him to study art seriously. After Tavernier's death in 1889 Hitchcock studied painting at the National Academy of Design in New York City and from 1891 to 1893 at the Académie Julian in Paris under Aldolphe Bourguereau and Gabriel Joseph Ferrier. His work was accepted at the Paris Salon of 1893. He returned to Hawaii in 1893.

In 1894, Hitchcock became one of the founders of the Kilohana Art League, an active art program in Honolulu at the turn of the century, exhibiting at least twice a year. He married Hester Judd Dickson (August 30, 1865 – November 24, 1921) on June 16, 1898, at the Cathedral Church of Saint Andrew, Honolulu. Her maternal grandfather was Gerrit Parmele Judd (1803–1873), an early missionary physician to Hawaii.

During extensive travels in the 1900s, Hitchcock explored the volcanic regions of the island of Hawaiʻi, and in July 1907 he made his first visit to the island of Kauaʻi, where he painted Waimea Canyon. He toured and painted the island of Maui in 1915 and 1916. He was a leading member of Hawaii's Volcano School, and his most important paintings date from about 1905 to 1930.

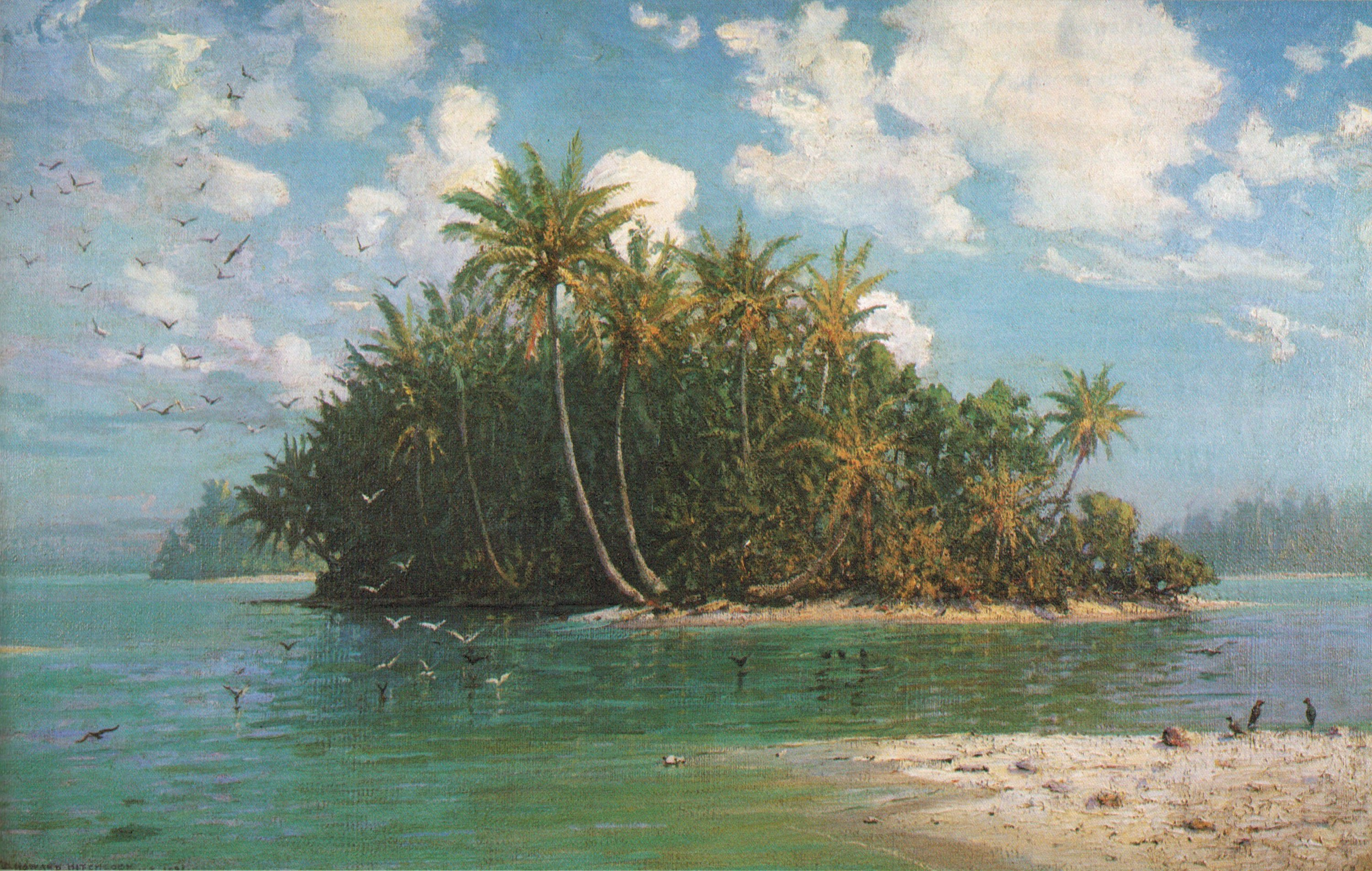
D. Howard Hitchcock's 1923 painting Palmyra

His paintings were exhibited at the Alaska–Yukon–Pacific Exposition in Seattle in 1909, where he was awarded a prize. In June 1910, he sailed for California and painted for several weeks around Mill Valley in Marin County. In July, he held a one-man exhibition at Schussler Brothers Gallery in San Francisco and received positive reviews in the San Francisco Call. He spent the remainder of July and August at Carmel-by-the-Sea, California, where he painted and exhibited his oils and watercolors at the Fourth Annual of the Carmel Arts and Crafts Club. Thereafter he traveled to Los Angeles and the East Coast to display his paintings. In 1912, 1913, 1920 and 1924, he returned to San Francisco to exhibit at several commercial galleries, including Vickery, Atkins & Torrey, the St. Francis Hotel, and Rabjohn & Morcom. His work was also included in the art galleries at San Francisco's Panama–Pacific International Exposition of 1915.

In 1919, he painted two murals for the Pan-Pacific Union in Honolulu. Later, he traveled to New York City, painting dramatic views of Hawaii for the new steamers Haleakala and Malolo of the Inter-Island Steam Navigation Company. During the late 1920s, his style became more impressionistic.

His canvases were displayed in 1924 at the First Hawaiian and South Seas Exhibition in the Los Angeles Museum in Exposition Park. In 1927, he exhibited several paintings at the opening of the Honolulu Museum of Art, where he had a retrospective exhibition in 1936. In 1939, he exhibited in the Golden Gate International Exposition in San Francisco and at the 1939 New York World's Fair.

== Death and legacy ==
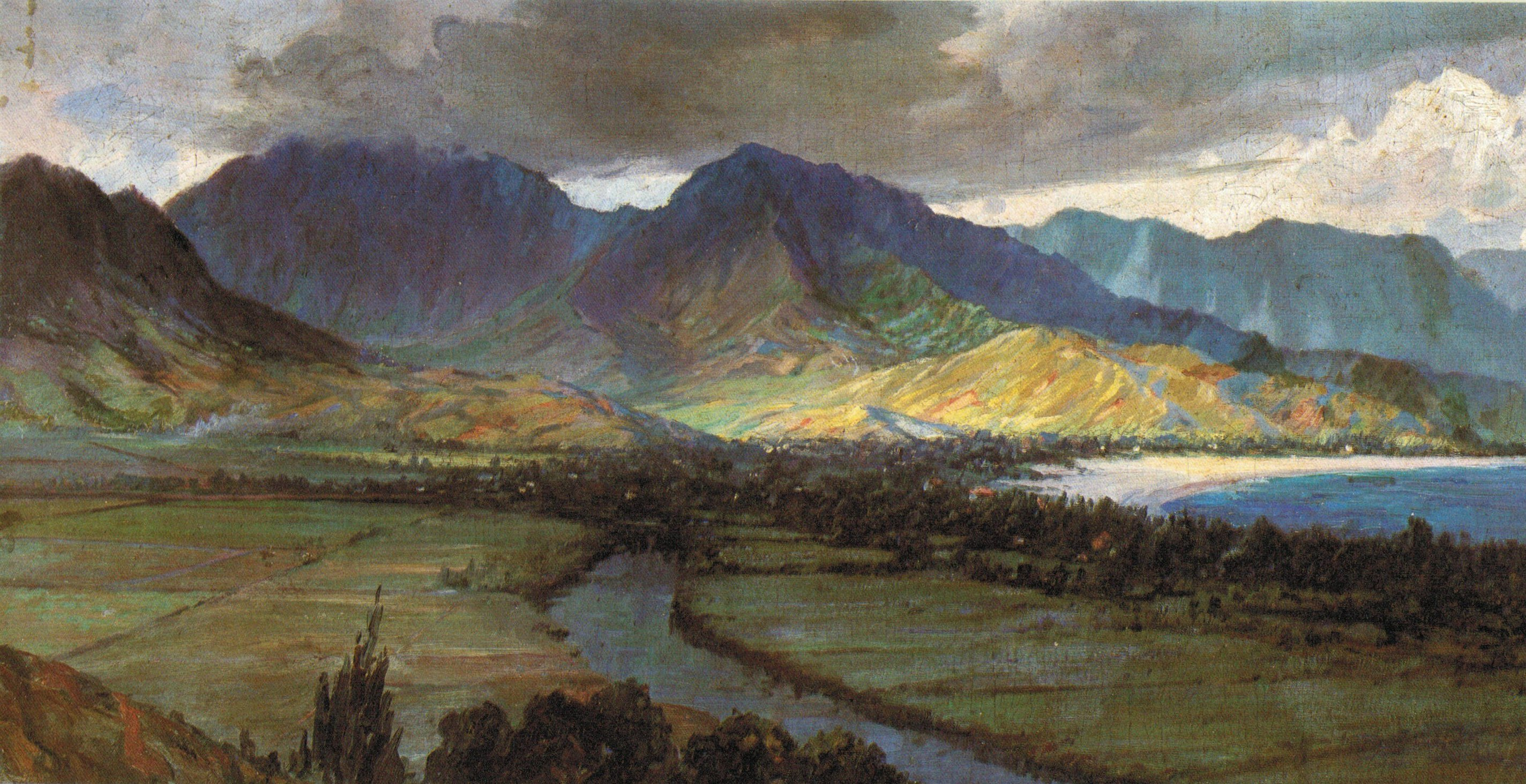
Hanalei, Kauai

Hitchcock died in Honolulu on January 1, 1943, after personally witnessing the attack on Pearl Harbor in 1941. He had three children: Howard Harvey Hitchcock, born March 26, 1899, Joshua Dickson Hitchcock, born February 24, 1901, and Helen Hitchcock Maxon, born June 17, 1906.

Hitchcock is credited for bringing home Boy Scouting from a California visit around 1910. He worked first with Paul Soper of the YMCA, and then James A. (Kimo) Wilder to establish Troop 1 and became its first scoutmaster. Hitchcock and Wilder were both artists, having similar backgrounds in art and travel, even sketching the grounding of the steamship Manchuria together in August, 1906. Wilder was cousin of Hitchcock's wife, and son of steamship company founder Samuel Gardner Wilder.

Hitchcock wrote:

Visiting such men as could be found who were interested I obtained all the data then available with a series of photographs from the East illustrating [Boy Scouts] activities and with these came back to Honolulu where I proceeded to organize a troop (now Troop I) which at first consisted of one patrol. It was later known as the Rainbow troop from the variety of colors represented in its personnel.

In 1966 his son Harvey donated a painting of the volcano goddess Pele which was displayed in the Hawaiʻi Volcanoes National Park visitor center. In 2003 the Volcano Art Center had a special competition for Pele paintings, in an effort to create a more modern and culturally authentic rendering. The Bernice P. Bishop Museum (Honolulu), The Boston Museum, the Honolulu Museum of Art, the Isaacs Art Center (Waimea, Hawaii), and the Oakland Museum of California are among the public collections holding paintings by David Howard Hitchcock.

Hitchcock is called the first homegrown artist in Hawaii with international recognition.

== Auction record ==
The auction record for a painting by David Howard Hitchcock is $115,315. This record was set by Untitled, Burning Lake, Hawaii, an 18.13" x 36.25" oil painting on canvas sold August 3, 2021, at Bonhams, sale of California and Western Art.

== See also ==
- Painting of Pele
