= William Richards Castle =

American lawyer and politician (1849–1935)

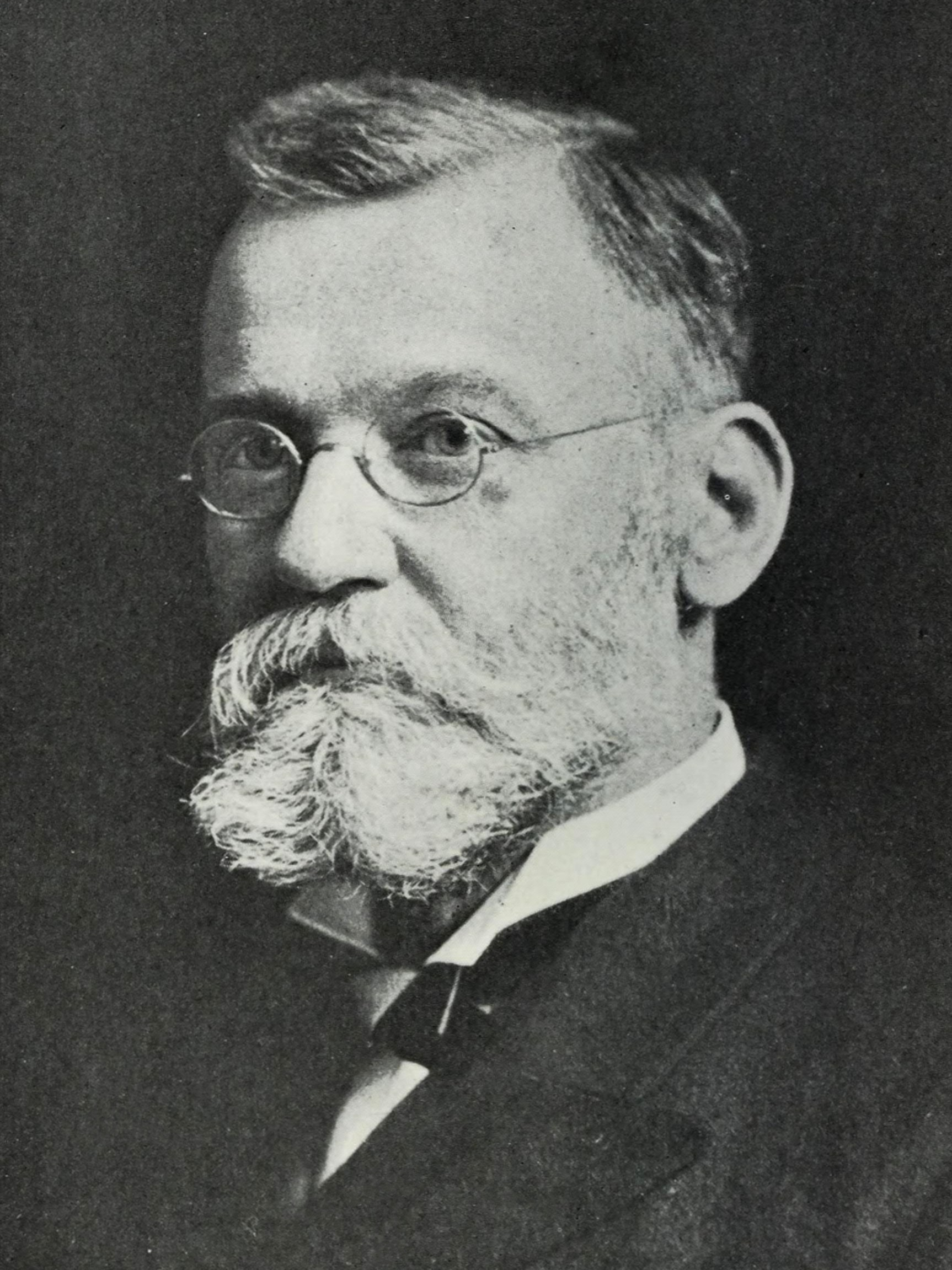
- Born: March 19, 1849; Honolulu, Hawaii
- Died: June 5, 1935 (aged 86)
- Occupations: Lawyer, Diplomat
- Spouse: Ida Beatrice Lowrey
- Children: William Richards Castle, Jr. + 2 others
- Parent(s): Samuel Northrup Castle; Mary C. Tenney

William Richards Castle (March 19, 1849 – June 5, 1935) was a lawyer and politician in the Kingdom of Hawaii and Republic of Hawaii.

== Family ==
William Richards Castle was born in Honolulu on March 19, 1849. His father was Samuel Northrup Castle (1808–1894), and mother was Mary Tenney Castle (1819–1907). He was a namesake of William Richards (1793–1847) who drafted the first constitution of the kingdom. On October 12, 1875, he married Ida Beatrice Lowrey (1854–1926) on October 12, 1875, and had three children.

His brothers George Parmele Castle (1851–1932) and James Bicknell Castle (1855–1918) became executives in the firm Castle & Cooke which was co-founded by his father and Amos Starr Cooke, and developed it into one of the "Big Five" corporations that dominated the Territory of Hawaii economy.

== Career ==
He attended Oahu College and then Oberlin College in Ohio and Harvard Law School, earning an LL.B. degree in 1873. He practised law for two years in New York City before returning to Hawaii in 1876. He was officer and director of several corporations. After Richard H. Stanley died in office in 1875, he was appointed to be Attorney General for King David Kalākaua from February to December 1876, when he was replaced by Alfred S. Hartwell. He was elected to the legislature of the Hawaiian Kingdom in the House of Representatives from 1878 to 1886, and House of Nobles from 1887 to 1888. Oberlin awarded him an honorary degree in 1887.

He later became a member of Committee of Safety, and member of Sons of the American Revolution. After the overthrow of the Kingdom of Hawaii in 1893, he served on commissions to lobby for annexation by the United States, was president of the Board of Education, and commissioner of public lands.

== Death and legacy ==
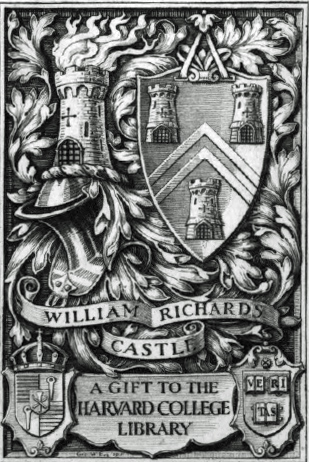
Bookplate for Harvard collection

He bequeathed a book fund at Harvard College Library in his name, focusing specifically on South Seas literature. His Ex libris bookplate contains personal coat of arms, arms of the Kingdom of Hawaii, and the Harvard College Shield. He died June 5, 1935, and was buried at the mission houses cemetery at Kawaiahaʻo Church.

=== Children ===
His son Alfred Lowrey Castle (1884–1972) also graduated from Harvard in 1906 and Harvard Law School, and joined the family firm of Castle & Withington in 1908. He then started his own law firm of Robertson, Castle and Olsen. Alfred was director of Alexander & Baldwin and elected to the Territorial legislature in 1911 and 1915-1918. He was a pitcher on the Harvard baseball team, and won 11 championships of the Hawaii Tennis Association. Alfred married Ethelinda Schaefer in 1908 and had a son Alfred Lowrey Castle Jr. and two other children. He was an active member of the American Alpine Club since 1930.

Castle's oldest son, William Richards Castle, Jr. was born June 19, 1878, became an educator, author and diplomat, and died October 14, 1963. His book Hawaii Past and Present, on the history and people of Hawaii, is dedicated to "My Father: Lifelong friend of the Hawaiian People; foremost among those who have laboured for the upbringing of the Islands—his unselfish devotion is the inspiration of his children."

He also had a daughter Beatrice who was born July 30, 1888, married Burton Edgar Newcomb, and died June 8, 1931.

A descendant directs a foundation in honor of the Castle family, and William Richards Castle was a founding trustee.

=== Family tree ===
Castle Hawaii family tree

Angeline Lorraine Tenney (1810–1841)	Samuel Northrup Castle (1808–1894)	Mary Tenney (1819–1907)
Edward G. Hitchcock (1837–1898)	Mary Tenney Castle (1838–1926)
William Richards Castle (1849–1935)	James Bicknell Castle (1855–1918)	William Drake Westervelt (1849–1939)	Caroline Dickinson Castle (1859–1941)	George Herbert Mead (1863–1931)	Helen Kingsbury Castle (1860–1929)
William Richards Castle, Jr. (1878–1963)	Harold Kainalu Long Castle (1886-1967)

Notes:

Government offices
Preceded by John S. Walker	Kingdom of Hawaii Attorney General; February 1876 – December 1876	Succeeded by Alfred S. Hartwell
