= Harvey Rexford Hitchcock =

Protestant missionary to the Kingdom of Hawaii from the United States

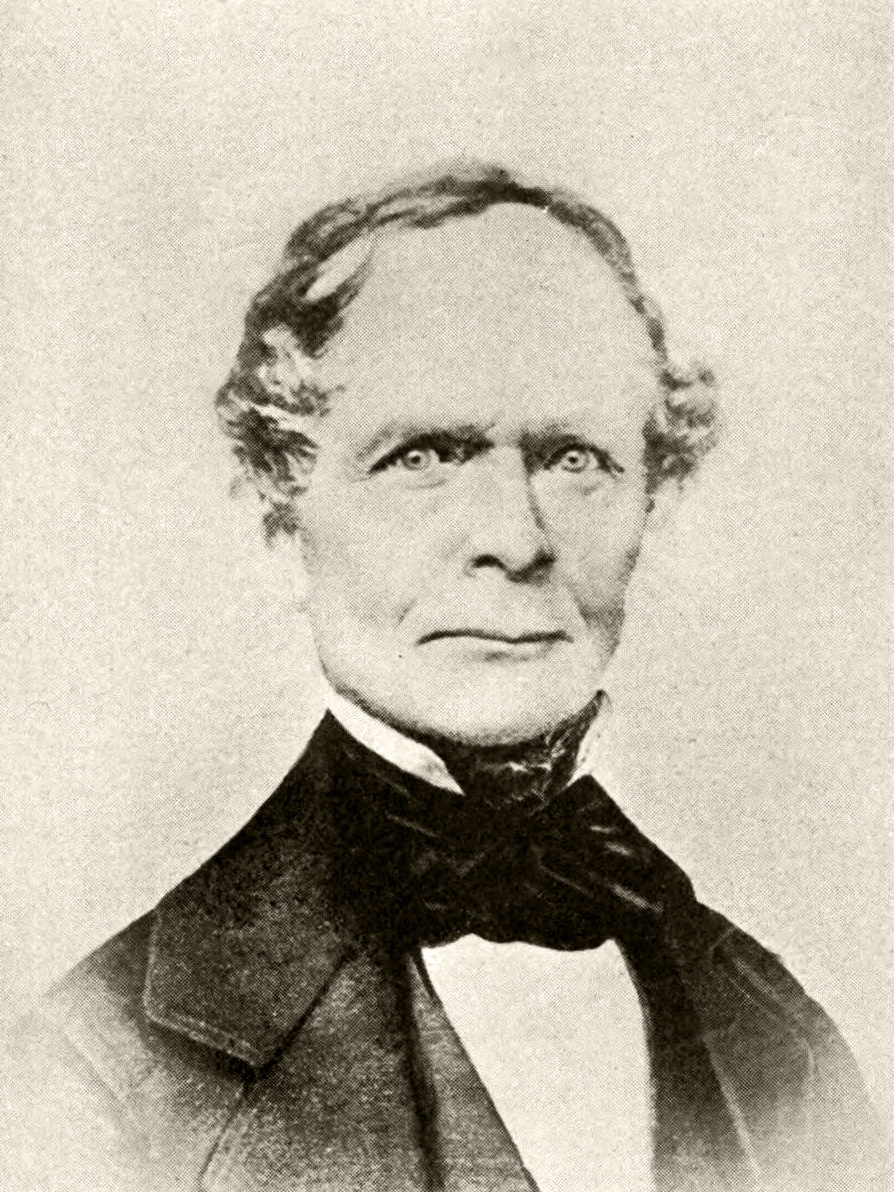
- Circa 1855
- Born: March 13, 1800; Great Barrington, Massachusetts
- Died: August 25, 1855 (aged 55); Molokaʻi
- Occupation: Missionary
- Spouse: Rebecca Howard
- Children: David Howard Hitchcock; H. Rexford Hitchcock; Edward Griffin Hitchcock
- Parent(s): David Hitchcock; Sarah Swan

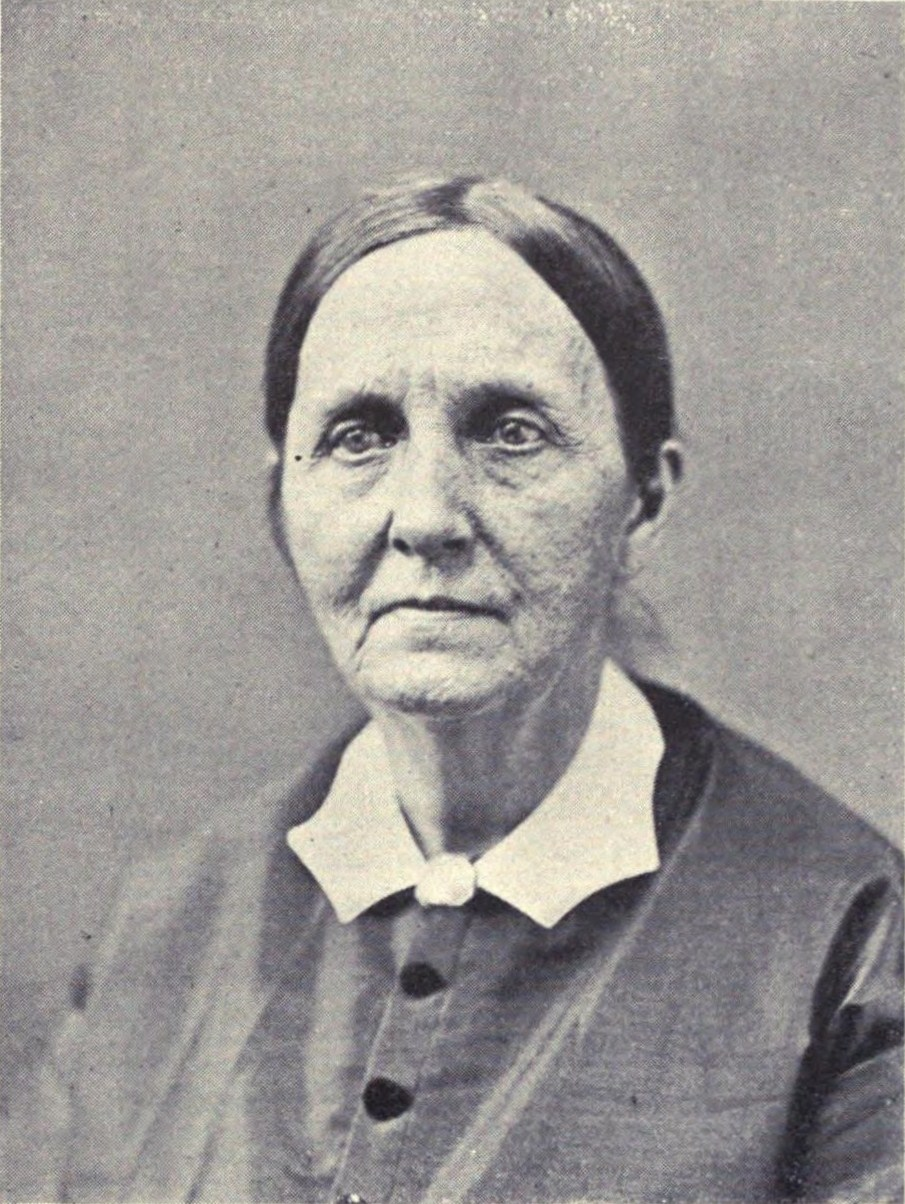
Rebecca Howard, 1889.

Harvey Rexford Hitchcock (March 13, 1800 – August 25, 1855) was an early Protestant missionary to the Kingdom of Hawaii from the United States. With his three sons, he and his wife started a family that would influence Hawaii's history. He had at least three namesakes in the subsequent generations.

== Life ==
Harvey Rexford Hitchcock was born March 13, 1800, in Great Barrington, Massachusetts. His father was David Hitchcock and mother was Sarah Swan. He was the oldest son of 11 children. He graduated from Williams College in 1828, and Auburn Theological Seminary in 1831. His younger brother George B. Hitchcock (1812–1872) also became a minister, and was active in the American abolitionism movement known as the Underground Railroad. He married Rebecca Howard (1808–1890) on August 26, 1831, in Auburn, New York, and sailed on November 26 to the Hawaiian Islands, as part of the fifth company from the American Board of Commissioners for Foreign Missions. They arrived in Honolulu May 17, 1832. Also on this voyage were missionaries William P. Alexander, David Belden Lyman, and Lorenzo Lyons. His sister Elizabeth Hitchcock (1802–1857) arrived 3 years later and in 1836 married missionary printer Edmond Horton Rogers (1806–1853).

They were assigned to start the first mission on the island of Molokaʻi. He took a short scouting mission around the island in the summer of 1832, and in September held the first Christian service in the open air. By June 19, 1833, with the assistance of Lowell Smith (1802–189), a thatched hut was chartered as the first church in an area called Kaluaʻaha. Ka lua ʻaha means "the gathering pit" in the Hawaiian language, the name of the ahupuaʻa (ancient Hawaiian land division) there. On December 6, 1835, a more permanent meeting house was dedicated with a stone base and wooden frame, about 90 feet (27 m) long by 42 feet (13 m) wide. From 1843 to 1847 they were assisted by Peter Johnson Gulick (1796–1877) and his wife. An even larger church building was dedicated April 3, 1844, for the growing congregation. This stone building with plaster finish was about 100 feet (30 m) long by 50 feet (15 m) wide with a gallery level above. Another home was built at a higher elevation called Maunaʻoluʻolu to escape the heat.

== Death and legacy ==
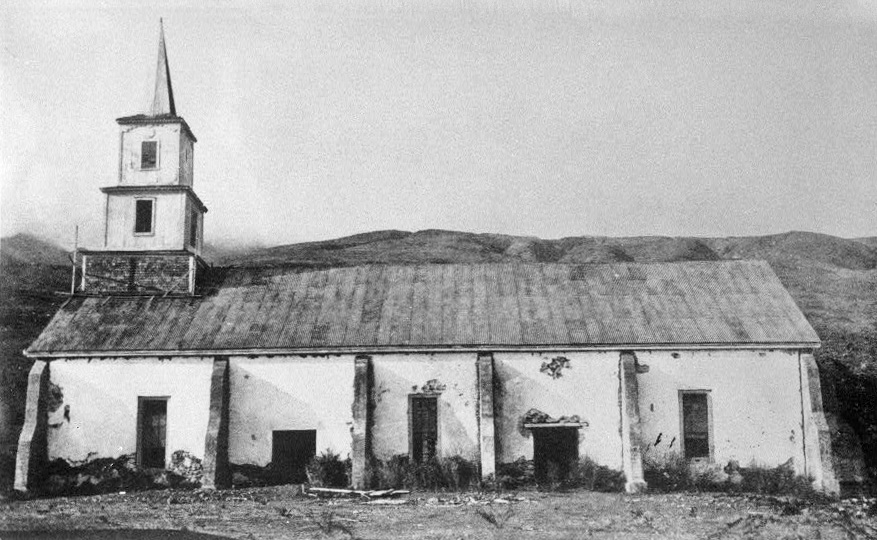
Church in 1912 before first restoration

The family traveled back to the United States for medical care in 1853, and returned on November 28, 1854. He died at the Kaluaʻaha home August 29, 1855, and is buried on the hillside overlooking the church. The church was restored and rededicated in 1917, but after suffering from termite damage on May 15, 1967, the steeple toppled and the church was in ruins for several decades. The small congregation maintains the site, and on September 27, 2009, had a rededication ceremony under a temporary corrugated metal roof. It is located at 21°4′2″N 156°49′13″W near the settlement known as Pukoʻo. Besides two daughters who died young in 1834 and 1838, they had three sons.

David Howard Hitchcock, born May 29, 1832, married Almeda Eliza Widger (1828–1895) March 13, 1857, and had a son also named David Howard Hitchcock (1861–1943) who was a painter. David Howard Hitchcock Sr. was a lawyer who served in the legislature of the Hawaiian Kingdom, and partnered with his daughter Almeda Eliza Hitchcock Moore (1863–1895) who was the first woman lawyer in Hawaii. He died December 12, 1899.

Harvey Rexford Hitchcock, Jr. (generally known as H. Rexford Hitchcock) was born in 1835 and published a dictionary of the Hawaiian language while principal of Lahainaluna School, in an effort to teach Hawaiians the English language. He married Alice Field Hardy (1854–1895) on May 30, 1877, was elected to the House of Representatives of the Kingdom from 1862 through 1870. He died June 6, 1891.

Edward Griffin Hitchcock was born January 20, 1837, married Mary Tenney Castle, daughter of Castle & Cooke founder Samuel Northrup Castle (1808–1894), and died October 9, 1898. Edward and Mary also named a son Harvey Rexford Hitchcock (1864–1931), who married Hannah Julia Meyer (1866–1912), daughter of German businessman Rudolph Wilhelm Meyer (1826–1897). Their son Harvey Rexford Hitchcock, Jr. (1891–1958) was on the 1913 College Football All-America Team from Harvard.

== Family tree ==
David Hitchcock	Sarah Swan
Harvey Rexford Hitchcock (1800–1855)	Rebecca Howard (1808–1890)	George B. Hitchcock (1812-1872)	Samuel Northrup Castle (1808–1894)
David Howard Hitchcock (1832-1899)	H. Rexford Hitchcock (1835–1891)	Edward G. Hitchcock (1837–1898)	Mary Tenney Castle (1838–1926)	R. W. Meyer (1826–1897)
D. Howard Hitchcock (1861–1943)	Harvey Rexford Hitchcock (1864–1931)	Hannah Julia Meyer (1866–1912)
Harvey Rexford Hitchcock, Jr. (1891-1958)
