= Harold K.L. Castle Foundation =

Private foundation from Hawaii, USA

- Company type: Non-Profit
- Industry: Education, Marine Conservation, Non-Profit
- Genre: Non-Profit
- Founder: Harold K.L. Castle
- Headquarters: Kailua, Hawaii, United States
- Key people: Mitch D'Olier
- Services: Grants
- Number of employees: <10
- Website: www.castlefoundation.org

The Harold K.L. Castle Foundation it is the largest private foundation headquartered in the State of Hawaii.

== History ==
Founder Harold Kainalu Long Castle was the owner of Kaneohe Ranch. The Castle Medical Center was named after Harold K.L. Castle's father, James Bicknell Castle. The foundation has contributed more than $8 million to the medical center and more than $143 million in grants. Since 2000, the foundation has granted more than $60 million; more than $50 million has gone to organizations serving the Windward side of Oahu. Foundation disburses an average of $7,000,000 in grants per year. The foundation provides grants from $500 to $5,000 to Windward youth group activities that include community service. Investments include grants for the Bishop Museum, Teach for America and stem cell research.

== Major Projects ==
- Public Education: The foundation works to close the achievement gap so that all of Hawaii's children, regardless of their socioeconomic background, have access to and benefit from high-quality education. The foundation works in a variety of tiers, from pre-kindergarten through 12th grade, that prepares Hawaii students for a competitive and prominent future.
- Marine conservation: The foundation works to restore Hawaii's nearshore marine life populations, in hopes that future generations will benefit and learn from Hawaii's most abundant and rich natural resources.
- Preservation of the culture of Hawaii: The foundation support's Windward Oahu communities' cultural legacy and heritage.
- Strengthen Windward Community: The foundation aims to preserve communal unity, family values, youth programs and regional natural resources.

== See also ==
- Harold K.L. Castle
