= Harvey Rexford Hitchcock Jr. =

American football player (1891–1958)

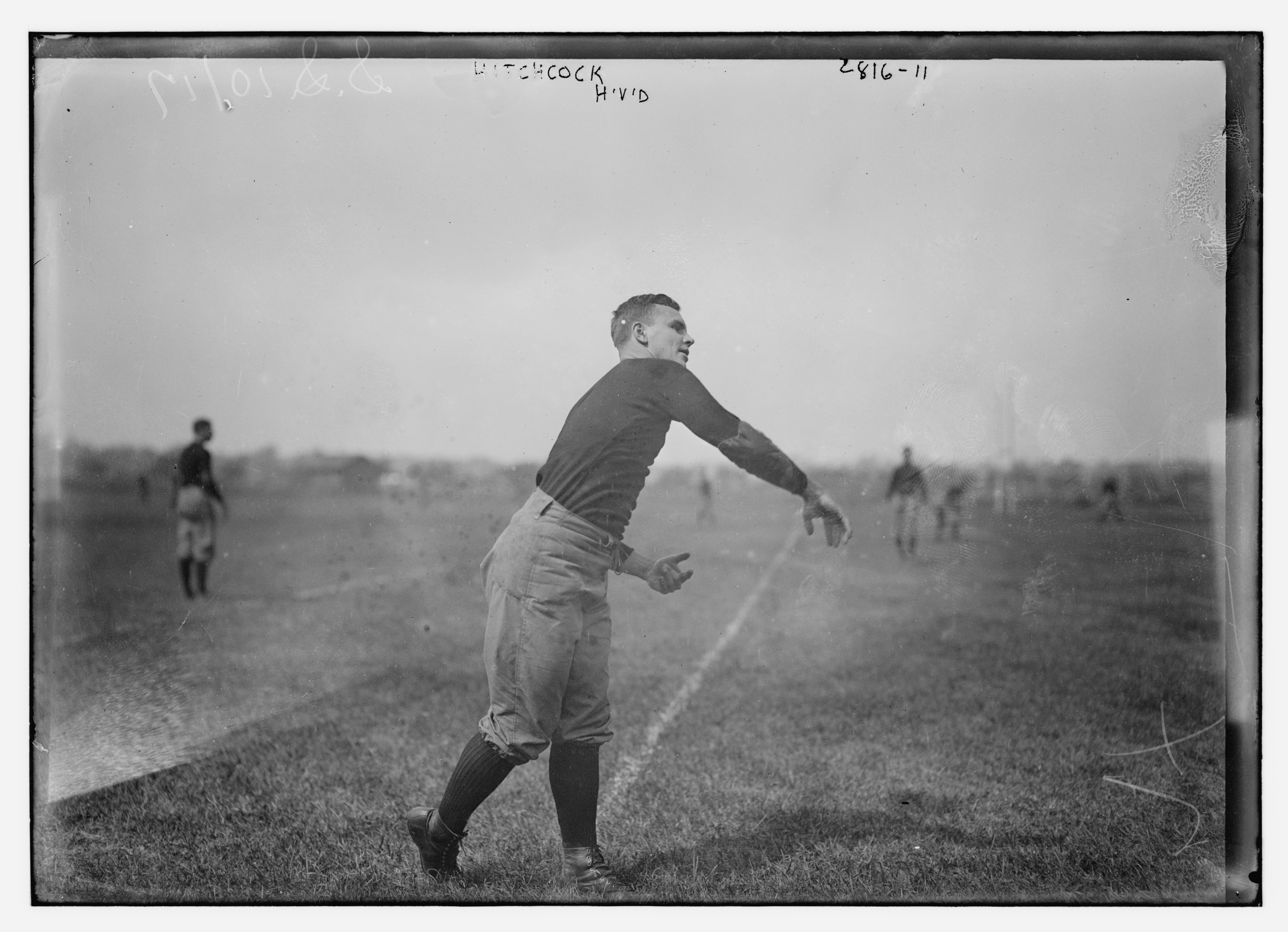
- Hitchcock in 1913

Profile
- Position: Tackle

Personal information
- Born: November 9, 1891; Molokai, Hawaii, U.S.
- Died: January 22, 1958 (aged 66); McLean, Virginia, U.S.

Career information
- College: Harvard (1913)

Awards and highlights
- 2× National champion (1912, 1913); Consensus All-American (1913)

Harvey Rexford Hitchcock Jr. (November 9, 1891 – January 22, 1958) was on the 1913 College Football All-America Team. From an influential missionary family in the Hawaiian Islands, he was admitted to McLean Hospital during World War I, where he would spend the remainder of his life.

== Life and career ==
Hitchcock was born November 9, 1891, on Molokaʻi island in the Kingdom of Hawaii. His father was Harvey Rexford Hitchcock Sr. (1864–1931). His paternal grandparents were Edward Griffin Hitchcock (1837–1898), son of Reverend Harvey Rexford Hitchcock (1800–1855), and Mary Tenney Castle (1838–1926), daughter of Castle & Cooke founder Samuel Northrup Castle (1808–1894). His mother was Hannah Julia Meyer (1866–1912), who was daughter of Rudolph Wilhelm Meyer and his wife, Kalama Waha, who was ethnically Native Hawaiian. Hitchcock's father's first cousin was painter David Howard Hitchcock (1861–1943). He also had a great-uncle named Harvey Rexford Hitchcock Jr. who lived 1835–1891 and published a dictionary of the Hawaiian language while principal of Lahainaluna School, and whose account of the 1874 election of King Kalākaua and the ensuing Honolulu Courthouse riot has been published in the Hawaiian Journal of History.

Hitchcock graduated from Punahou School in 1910, winning the Roll of Honor award. He then attended Harvard University, as did his father. While at Harvard he was the vice-president of the student union. He played as a tackle on the Harvard Crimson football team and was on the 1913 College Football All-America Team. He also played as pitcher on the baseball team. He graduated in 1914.

In September 1914, Hitchcock entered Harvard Law School. He volunteered to work for the Red Cross as an ambulance driver in World War I, but became ill waiting for a passport. He resigned from the law school and took a job with Firestone Tire and Rubber Company on April 19, 1915. He served in the National Guard in Ohio and Texas. In 1917 he attended the final illness of his brother. By March 1917 he returned to Firestone, but resigned in April to apply for an officer's commission, and was recalled into the National Guard. By August he became 2nd lieutenant, and 1st lieutenant October 23, 1917. On January 16, 1918, he was sent to France for artillery school. He served as an instructor and in combat that summer. In September, he was admitted to a field hospital, and sent back to Washington, D.C. He was discharged in April 1919, and on January 1, 1920, admitted to McLean Hospital for the insane, where he died on January 22, 1958. Hitchcock was then interred at Arlington National Cemetery.
