= Kaneohe Ranch =

Company in Hawaii

Kaneohe Ranch Management Limited
- Type: Private
- Industry: Commercial Real Estate, Land Development
- Founded: Harold K.L. Castle Foundation
- Founder: Harold K.L. Castle
- Headquarters: Kailua, HI, United States
- Number of employees: <20

Kaneohe Ranch Management Limited manages the real estate owned by the family of Harold K.L. Castle and Alice H. Castle, and their non-profit charitable foundation, the Harold K.L. Castle Foundation founded in 1962. In 2014, most of its real estate assets were sold for $373 million. The real estate portfolio had consisted of land holdings on the windward side of Oahu, Hawaii, as well as other Oahu and mainland United States properties. Properties had included commercial, retail, office, industrial and residential parcels.

== History ==
=== Mid 19th century ===
During the mid-19th century, most of the land in the area belonged to Kalama, Queen Consort of Kamehameha III and later Queen Dowager of the Kingdom of Hawaiʻi. She and Judge Charles Coffin Harris began a sugarcane plantation on the land, but after she died in 1870 and it failed in 1871, the land eventually passed to Harris's daughter, Nannie H. Rice, who leased 15,000 acres (61 km^{2}) to J. P. Mendonca in 1894 to start Kaneohe Ranch.

=== Late 19th-early 20th century ===
Born in 1886, Harold Kainalu Long Castle was the descendant of prominent businessmen and missionaries in Oahu. James Bicknell Castle, his father, served as a director of his father's company and as a partner of Alexander & Baldwin, another “Big Five” company. By the late 1890s the Castle family was accumulating much of the east side of the island.

In the early 20th century Kaneohe Ranch lands were used for growing pineapple, processing sugar and for cattle operations. Harold K.L. Castle purchased Kailua in early 1917. The Kaneohe Ranch controlled nearly the entire Ko’olaupoko plain from the present Windward Community College through the present Windward Mall down to the piers at Heʻeia on Kaneohe Bay, all the way through Kailua to the Olomana Country Club. Its headquarters, the Kaneohe Ranch Building at Castle Junction, was added to the U.S. National Register of Historic Places in 1987.

=== Mid-to-late 20th century ===
Over the last half of the 20th century, Kaneohe Ranch transformed what was once natural wetlands into a suburban community.

At the end of World War II, demand for affordable housing grew. The idea to build houses on long-term leased land became popular due to their lower purchase cost.

As part of his development strategy, Castle donated land along Kailua Road to churches that would eventually attract congregations to migrate towards Kailua. Further donations of land to schools, universities and hospitals enhanced the attractiveness of the community.

=== 21st century ===
In the early 21st century, many commercial ground leases expired. Kaneohe Ranch initiated a community planning process in 2004 for redeveloping properties with expiring leases. In 2004 the first phase of construction in Kailua town center included a new 30,000-square-foot (2,800 m^{2}) Longs Drugs store, 2,618 square feet (243.2 m^{2}) of retail frontage along Kailua Road, and a 427 stall, 3-story parking garage. The second phase, completed in the summer of 2006, included a 11,023-square-foot (1,024.1 m^{2}) Pier 1 Imports and the Kainalu Plaza and fountain. The Kalapawai Café opened in 2007 with a similar look to the Kalapawai Market. The third phase included 12,000 square feet (1,100 m^{2}) of retail space, a new location for First Hawaiian Bank, Hawaii's second Whole Foods Market, and additional parking. A two-story retail and office building was to be set back from streets by 15 feet (4.6 m) to allow for wider sidewalks and outdoor dining areas.

In 2014, most of the properties managed by Kaneohe Ranch were sold and Carlton K.C. Au was appointed president of the organization. Au succeeded H. Mitchell “Mitch” D’Olier who had led Kaneohe Ranch for 22 years.

== Donations ==
Kaneohe Ranch has donated lands to the following:

- Castle High School
- Castle Medical Center
- Marine Corps Base Hawaii
- Kawai Nui Marsh
- Hawaii Loa College
- Windward Community College
