= William Richards Castle Jr. =

American diplomat (1878–1963)

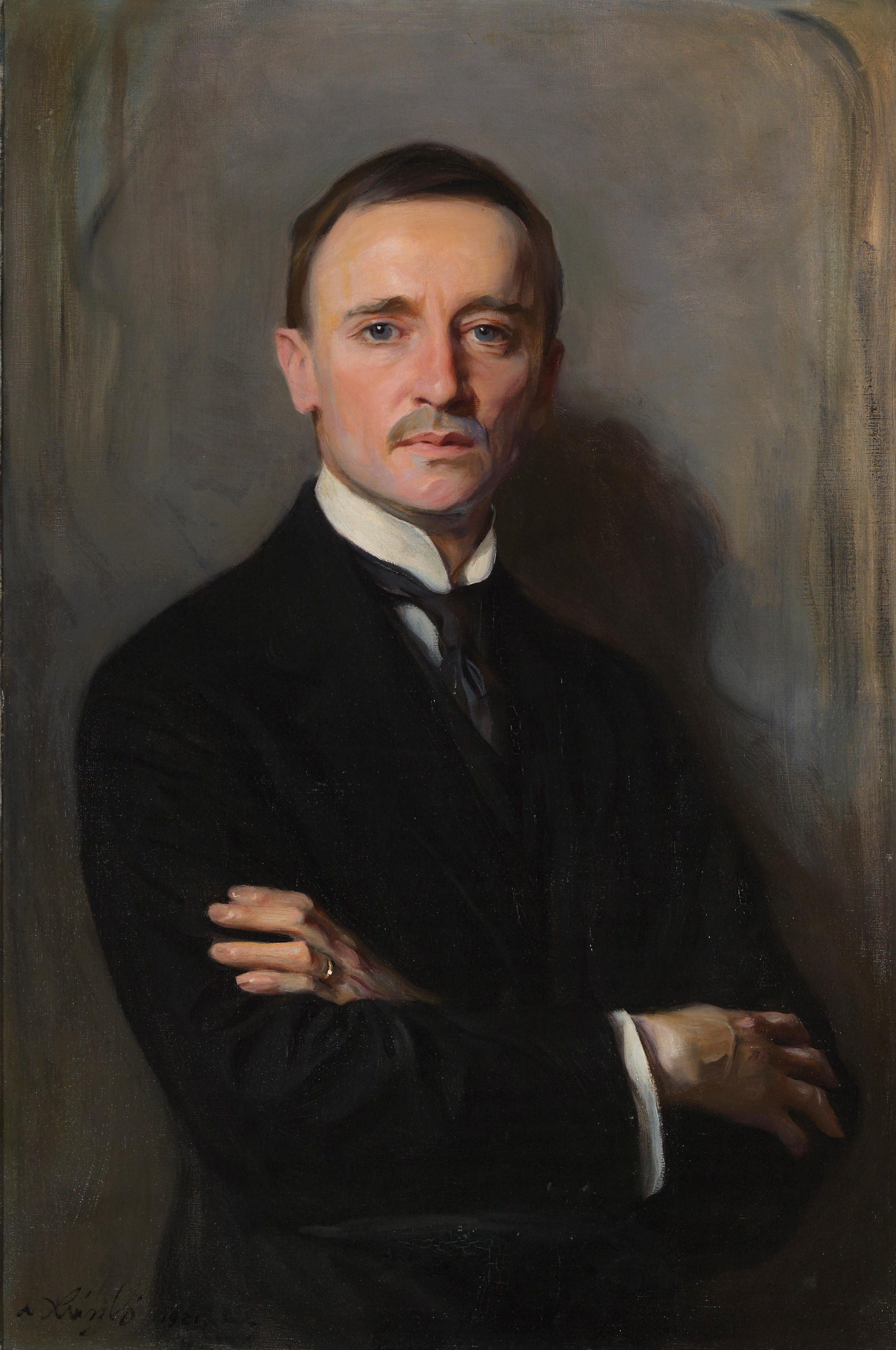
- William Richards Castle Jr. (Philip de László, 1921)
- Born: June 19, 1878; Honolulu, Hawaii
- Died: October 13, 1963 (aged 85); Washington, DC
- Occupations: Educator, Diplomat
- Spouse: Margaret Farlow
- Children: 1 child: Rosamond
- Parent(s): William Richards Castle; Ida Beatrice Lowrey

William Richards Castle Jr. (June 19, 1878 – October 13, 1963) was an American educator and diplomat. He rose rapidly to the highest levels of the United States Department of State and took a strong interest in Pacific issues, in part because of his family's background in Hawaii.

== Life ==
William Richards Castle Jr. was born in Honolulu on June 19, 1878, when it was the Kingdom of Hawaii. His father, William Richards Castle, served King David Kalākaua as attorney general and later as Hawaiian Minister to the United States, where he was an active proponent of annexation. His grandfather, Samuel Northrup Castle, founded the giant agricultural corporation Castle & Cooke. William Richards Castle Jr. graduated from Punahou School and then Harvard College in 1900, where he was a founding member of the Fox Club. His mentor was Professor Barrett Wendell. He remained at Harvard as an English instructor and assistant dean in charge of freshmen from 1904 to 1913. In 1910 he was President and one of the founders of the Hawaiian Trail & Mountain Club. From 1915 through 1917, he was editor of the Harvard Graduates' Magazine and wrote several articles for it. He published two novels and a book on Hawaiian history.

During World War I he opened an American Red Cross bureau in Washington, DC, to assist in reuniting families and locating U.S. citizens missing overseas. As Director of Communications, his department handled 10,000 letters per day.

Historian Robert H. Ferrell described Castle as "a handsome, genial man, who ... had a way of disarming people. When he fixed his friendly eyes upon a minister or ambassador the envoy often would completely forget diplomacy and pour out his heart. But behind the friendly eyes lurked a razor-sharp mind which soon afterward mercilessly recorded all confessions in official State Department memoranda. Not without reason did the French journalist Pertinax characterize him as the 'subtil Mons. Castle.'"

== Diplomat ==
In 1919 Castle joined the U.S. State Department, rising quickly in part because of his Harvard connections. He served as assistant chief of the division of Western European affairs and from 1921 as its chief. He was appointed Assistant Secretary of State on February 26, 1927, during the administration of Calvin Coolidge. During this time he was instrumental behind the scenes in the creation of the Kellogg-Briand Pact. Castle managed to overcome French objections through his discussions with the French ambassador, replacing the narrow Franco-American agreement with a treaty that attracted almost all major and minor nations.

=== Japan ===
He was U.S. Ambassador to Japan for five months during 1930 to negotiate the changes in warship limits that Japan requested from the five-power London Naval Conference 1930. He was named to this position on December 11, 1929, in large part because he had a private income sufficient to defray the costs of an ambassadorship while the State Department salaries and funds provided for entertainment were so low. Tokyo, with the highest cost of living of any post, had been vacant since Charles MacVeagh (1860–1931) resigned on December 6, 1928. Castle's appointment to Japan was only for the duration of the conference. The press called him a "pinch hitter". He presented credentials on January 24, 1930, and left on May 27, 1930, but in that short time had developed a sympathetic view of Japan's foreign policy. The day before departing he laid the cornerstone of a new American Embassy in Tokyo to replace the structure destroyed in the 1923 Great Kantō earthquake. Japanese dignitaries attending the ceremonies included Prince Tokugawa Iesato (President of the America-Japan Society), Kijūrō Shidehara (Japanese Foreign Minister), and industrialist Shibusawa Eiichi.

Although the modification of the treaty was supported by Japanese Prime Minister Osachi Hamaguchi, the Japanese military was outraged at any restrictions. Naval Chief of Staff Admiral Kanji Katō refused to attend a farewell dinner for Castle. When Naval Minister Takarabe Takeshi repeated the invitation, the Admiral resigned rather than attend. Yeiji Kusakari, another Japanese Naval officer, committed the traditional suicide known as Seppuku, widely thought to be in protest of the treaty.

Castle returned to his post of Assistant Secretary of State on May 27, 1930. The position of U.S. Ambassador to Japan remained vacant until William Cameron Forbes (1870–1959) presented his credentials on September 25, 1930.

=== Under Secretary ===
On April 1, 1931, Castle was appointed Under Secretary of State following the death of Joseph Potter Cotton. He was confirmed on December 17, 1931, and served until March 5, 1933. It was the second-ranking post in the department to Henry L. Stimson in the Herbert Hoover administration. Castle was acting Secretary of State during negotiation of the Hoover Moratorium on World War I reparations in 1931. The press appreciated his communications on the negotiations. In September 1931 Castle tried to defuse the tense situation that developed in the aftermath of the Japanese invasion of Manchuria. With the election of Democrat Franklin D. Roosevelt, Castle was replaced by William Phillips (1878–1968) as Under Secretary.

=== Later years ===
From 1933, Castle wrote numerous articles and speeches especially as an outspoken critic of the New Deal. He opposed conflict with Japan, in part because he feared its impact on Hawaii, fears borne out by the 1941 attack on Pearl Harbor. During World War II he continued to oppose Roosevelt's policies. However, Secretary of State Cordell Hull often consulted Castle behind-the-scenes as one of the few experts on Japanese affairs. Castle spoke out against misleading propaganda. He advocated realistic dialog with compromises from negotiation and mutual trade. He also influenced the Treaty of San Francisco and occupation of Japan after the war.

He married Margaret Farlow on June 3, 1902. Their only child, Rosamond Castle, was born March 4, 1904, married Alan Francis Winslow on October 20, 1923, and died February 26, 1932, leaving three young sons.

Castle was elected a fellow of the American Academy of Arts and Sciences in 1932. He received honorary degrees from the University of Rochester in 1932, Doctor of Civil Law from the University of the South in 1935, and Bryant College in 1936. He was elected to the Harvard Board of Overseers from 1935 to 1941. In 1937 he worked for John Hamilton on the Republican National Committee to rebuild the party after the defeats of the 1936 elections. He served as president of Garfield Memorial Hospital in Washington, DC, from 1945 to 1952. He died on October 13, 1963, in Washington, DC.

His diaries were donated to Harvard and other papers were donated to the Herbert Hoover Presidential Library by his grandsons in April 1970.

His house in Washington DC, designed in 1929 by Carrere & Hastings, survives on 2200 S Street NW in the Kalorama neighborhood.

== Works ==
- William Richards Castle Jr. (2008) [1912]. The Green Vase. Kessinger Publishing, LLC. ISBN 978-1-4374-1299-4.
- William Richards Castle Jr. (2008) [1914]. The Pillar of Sand. Kessinger Publishing, LLC. ISBN 978-1-4373-2669-7.
- William Richards Castle Jr. (1917) [1915]. Hawaii Past and Present. Dodd, Mead and Company.
- William Richards Castle Jr. (1916). Wake up, America: a plea for the recognition of our individual and national responsibilities. Dodd, Mead and Company.
- William Richards Castle Jr.; Paul Kaufman (1926). Essays in memory of Barrett Wendell. Harvard University Press.
- William Richards Castle Jr. (1960). Life of Samuel Northrup Castle. Hawaiian Historical Society and Samuel N. and Mary Castle Foundation.

== Family tree ==
Castle Hawaii family tree

Angeline Lorraine Tenney (1810–1841)	Samuel Northrup Castle (1808–1894)	Mary Tenney (1819–1907)
Edward G. Hitchcock (1837–1898)	Mary Tenney Castle (1838–1926)
William Richards Castle (1849–1935)	James Bicknell Castle (1855–1918)	William Drake Westervelt (1849–1939)	Caroline Dickinson Castle (1859–1941)	George Herbert Mead (1863–1931)	Helen Kingsbury Castle (1860–1929)
William Richards Castle, Jr. (1878–1963)	Harold Kainalu Long Castle (1886-1967)

Notes:

Diplomatic posts
Preceded by Charles MacVeagh	U.S. Ambassador to Japan; January – May 1930	Succeeded by William Cameron Forbes
Political offices
Preceded by Joseph P. Cotton	Under Secretary of State; 1931–1933	Succeeded by William Phillips
