= James Bicknell Castle =

Hawaiian businessman (1855–1918)

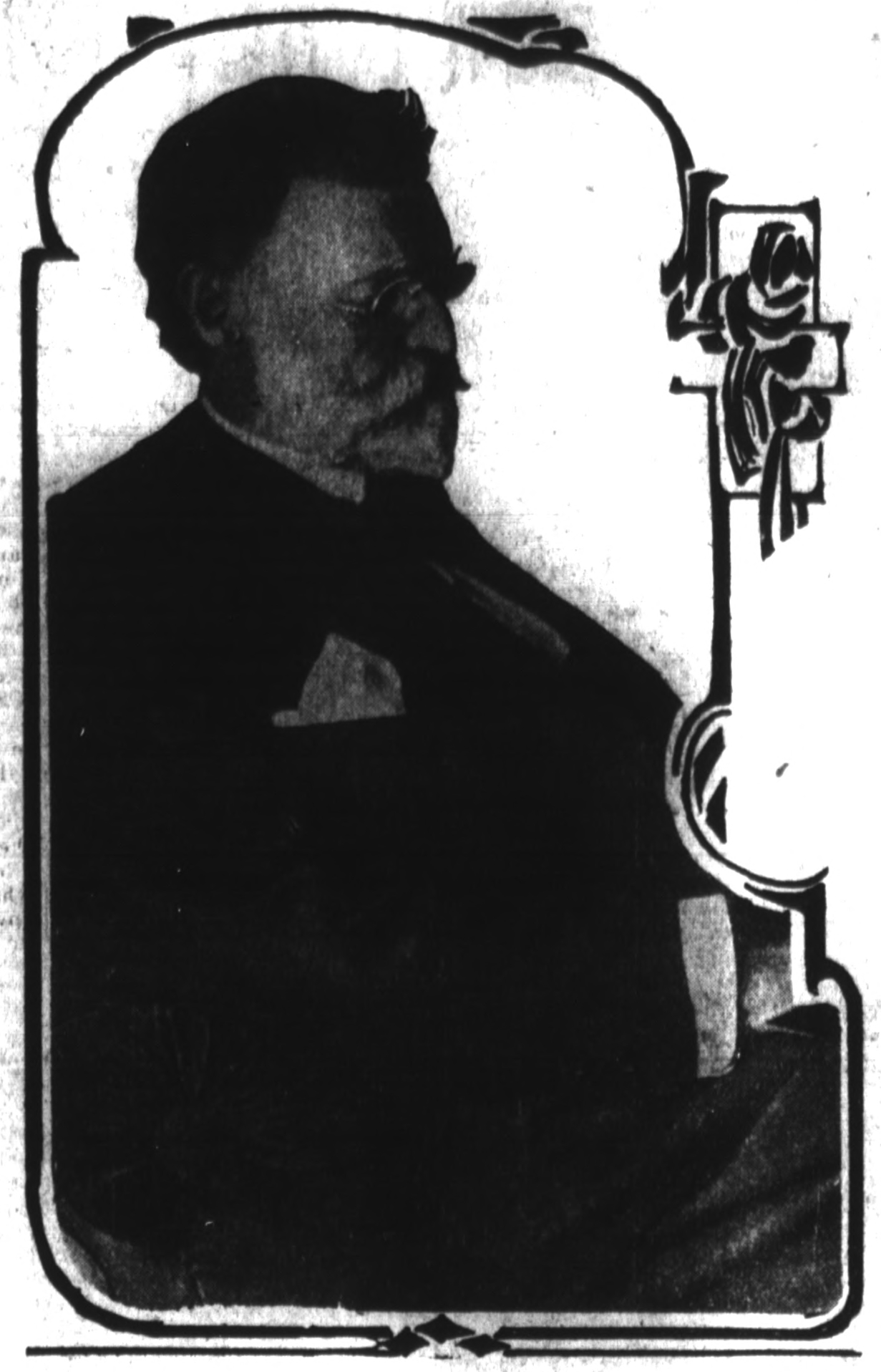
- Born: November 27, 1855; Honolulu, Hawaii
- Died: April 5, 1918 (aged 62)
- Spouse: Julia White
- Children: Harold Kainalu Long Castle
- Parent(s): Samuel Northrup Castle; Mary Tenney

James Bicknell Castle (November 27, 1855 – April 5, 1918) was a Hawaiian businessman in the times of the Kingdom of Hawaii, Republic of Hawaii and Territory of Hawaii.

== Life ==
James Bicknell Castle was born November 27, 1855, in Honolulu. His father was Samuel Northrup Castle (1808–1894), and mother was Mary Tenney Castle (1819–1907). He attended Punahou School 1867–1873, and then Oberlin College. He greatly expanded Castle & Cooke in the sugar and railroad industries. He is credited with winning control of the Hawaiian Commercial & Sugar Company from Claus Spreckels in 1898, which he sold to Alexander & Baldwin for a large share of their stock. This episode resulting in a lawsuit by the former manager of the plantation, William J. Lowrie. He bought large amounts of land, such as Kaneohe Ranch.

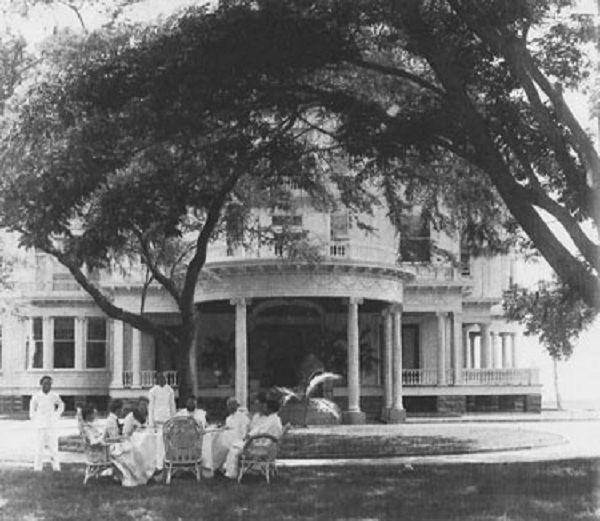
Castle's house in Waikiki

He served as an officer in the Kingdom of Hawaii army in 1890, and was appointed to the Bureau of Immigration. In 1891 he was acting Auditor General, and Collector General of Customs from April 15, 1893, to August 31, 1897. Later in 1897, he served as secretary of the delegation from the Republic of Hawaii sent to Washington, D.C., to lobby for annexation at the request of Lorrin Andrews Thurston.

During the decade up to 1906, he tried to lure white labor colonists to the Islands. A failed effort was organized by Peter Demens who arranged to bring all Spiritual Christians from Russia, who were immigrating to Canada, whom he diverted to Los Angeles, to Hawaii. This first Russian labor experiment failed within six months and cost Castle about $30,000.

He built a large house called Kainalu near Diamond Head. When the Honolulu Rapid Transit & Land Co. was in danger of failing, he used his financial resources to keep the effort alive.

Castle married Julia Matilda White (1849–1943), daughter of cotton mill owner Nelson Davis White (1819–1889) in Winchendon, Massachusetts, on November 2, 1879. Their son Harold Kainalu Long Castle (1886–1967) expanded the business and donated land for several educational institutions. They also had two sons Nelson Northrop (1885) and Kenneth Kingsbury (1888) who both died young.

Castle died April 5, 1918, aged 62. Two days later Benjamin Dillingham died, who married a distant cousin, and partnered in building railroads to the Castle plantations.

He and his wife are buried in the cemetery at Kawaiahaʻo Church, across the street from where he was born. James B. Castle High School and the Castle Medical Center are named for him.

=== Family tree ===
Castle Hawaii family tree

Angeline Lorraine Tenney (1810–1841)	Samuel Northrup Castle (1808–1894)	Mary Tenney (1819–1907)
Edward G. Hitchcock (1837–1898)	Mary Tenney Castle (1838–1926)
William Richards Castle (1849–1935)	James Bicknell Castle (1855–1918)	William Drake Westervelt (1849–1939)	Caroline Dickinson Castle (1859–1941)	George Herbert Mead (1863–1931)	Helen Kingsbury Castle (1860–1929)
William Richards Castle, Jr. (1878–1963)	Harold Kainalu Long Castle (1886-1967)
