= George B. Hitchcock =

American priest

Reverend George Beckwith Hitchcock (1812–1872) was an American involved in housing slaves on their way to freedom. His house in Lewis, Iowa, now a National Historic Landmark, was part of the Underground Railroad.

== Life ==
George Beckwith Hitchcock was born in Massachusetts January 9, 1812. His father was David Hitchcock Jr. and mother was Sarah Swan. His older brother Harvey Rexford Hitchcock (1800–1855) was ordained a minister and became a missionary to the Kingdom of Hawaii in 1831. He was against slavery, and joined the abolitionism movement known as the Underground Railroad. He became an ordained minister in 1844 for the Congregational Church, becoming a travelling preacher in Iowa. He settled in Lewis, Iowa in the mid-1850s, and he lived in a log cabin until the completion of his stone house in 1856. The Reverend George B. Hitchcock House is now a museum. He moved to Missouri in 1865, and began preaching to newly freed blacks, moving to Kansas to do the same two years later. Hitchcock died August 4, 1872, of presumed natural causes.
