= William Drake Westervelt =

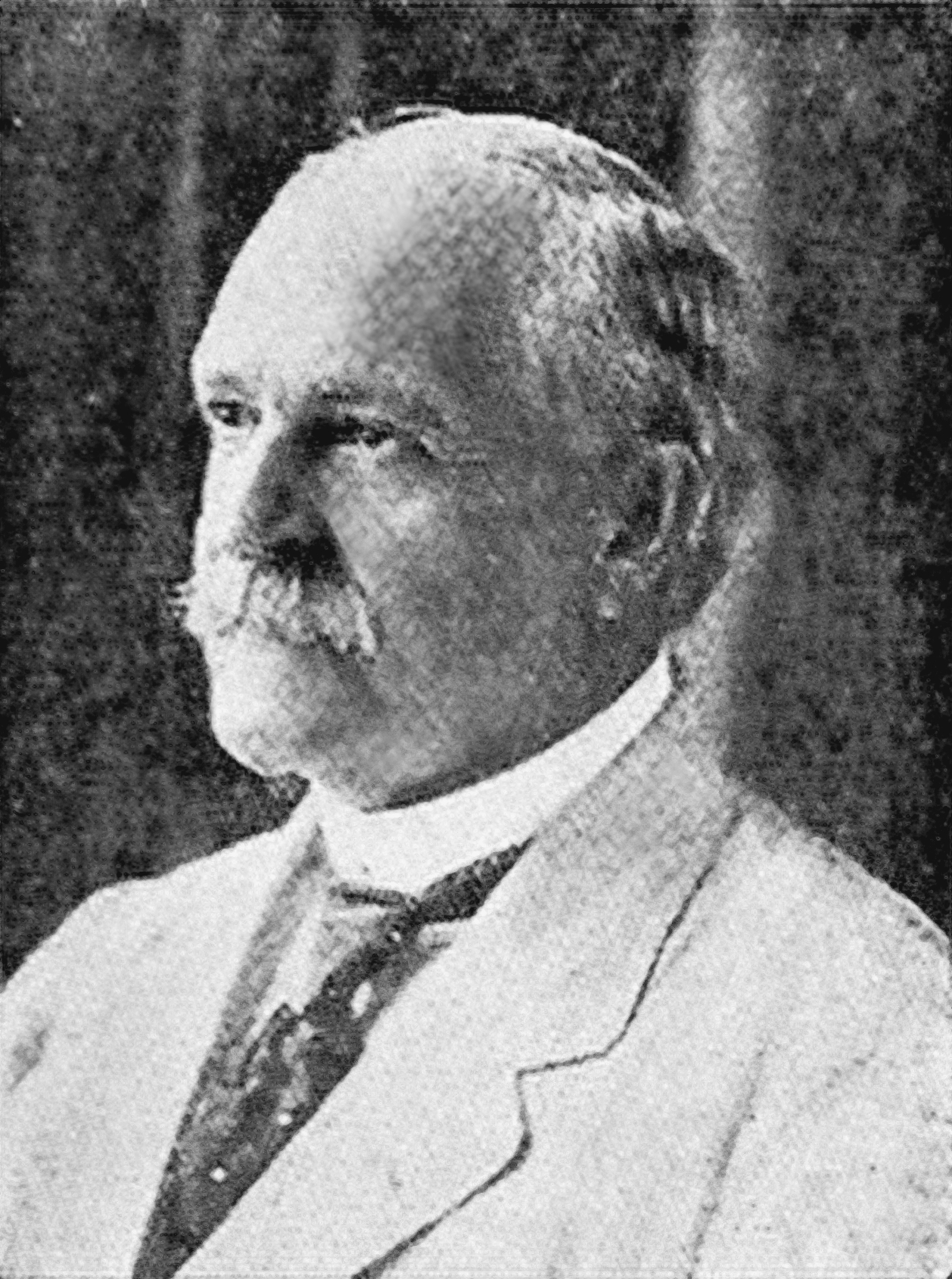
William Drake Westervelt (circa 1916)

William Drake Westervelt (December 26, 1849 – March 9, 1939) was the author of several books and magazines on Hawaiian history and legends. He drew upon the collections of David Malo, Samuel Kamakau, and Abraham Fornander to popularize Hawaiian folklore in his Legends of Maui (1910), Legends of Old Honolulu (1915), Legends of Gods and Ghost-Gods (1915), Hawaiian Legends of Volcanoes (1916) and Hawaiian Historical Legends (1923).

== Biography ==
Rev. William D. Westervelt was born in Oberlin, Ohio. He graduated from Oberlin College in 1871 with a B.A. degree, and from Oberlin Theological Seminary in 1874 with a B.D. degree. Pastor of churches in Cleveland, Ohio and Colorado, he settled in Hawaii in 1899, marrying a missionary descendant, Caroline Dickinson Castle (1859–1941). After the Hawaiian Historical Society was re-formed, he served as the Corresponding Secretary starting in 1908. He would later serve as treasurer and president.

Westervelt's interest in Hawaiian mythology was an avocation that led to numerous magazine and newspaper articles, many reprinted in his several collections. He is noted as one of Hawaii's foremost authorities on island folklore in the English language. His anthologies of Hawaiian myths, legends and folk tales are considered among the best of the English versions of a Hawaiian view of the sacred and profane.

Oberlin College bestowed an honorary Doctor of Divinity on Westervelt in 1926. He died at his Waikiki home in March 1939.

== Castle family tree ==
Castle Hawaii family tree

Angeline Lorraine Tenney (1810–1841) | Samuel Northrup Castle (1808–1894) | Mary Tenney (1819–1907)
Edward G. Hitchcock (1837–1898) | Mary Tenney Castle (1838–1926)
William Richards Castle (1849–1935) | James Bicknell Castle (1855–1918) | William Drake Westervelt (1849–1939) | Caroline Dickinson Castle (1859–1941) | George Herbert Mead (1863–1931) | Helen Kingsbury Castle (1860–1929)
William Richards Castle, Jr. (1878–1963) | Harold Kainalu Long Castle (1886-1967)
