= Rudolph Wilhelm Meyer =

German who managed an early agricultural business in the Kingdom of Hawaii

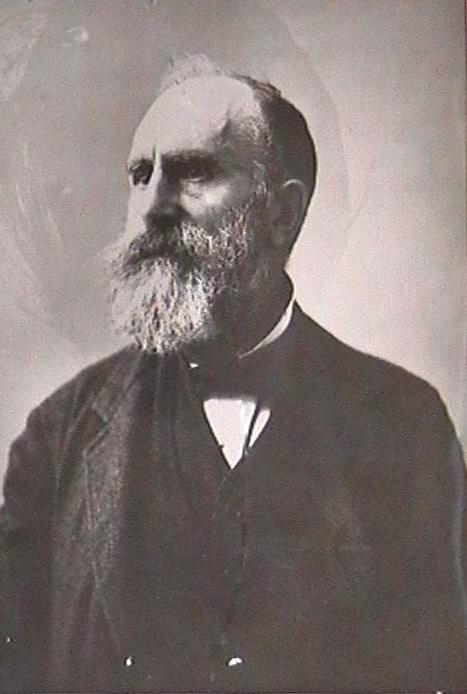
- Born: April 2, 1826; Hamburg, Germany
- Died: 1897
- Occupations: surveyor, Businessman
- Spouse: High Chiefess Kalama Waha
- Children: 11

Rudolph Wilhelm Meyer (1826–1897) was a German who managed an early agricultural business in the Kingdom of Hawaii.

== Life ==
Rudolph Wilhelm Meyer was born on April 2, 1826, to Rudolph Heinrich Meyer and Christine Ludewike Sengevald. They lived in the Hanse district of Hamburg, Germany, on the estuary of the Elbe River in Schleswig-Holstein, about 250 kilometres (160 mi) northwest of Berlin. Meyer graduated from the local Hochschule (technical school) city as a civil engineer specializing in hydraulics and survey work; and he became an employee of the Water Works Department of Hamburg. He left behind a sister named Bertha and two half brothers.

Because of an argument with his stepmother, he intended to join the California Gold Rush in 1848, but was delayed on a stopover in Sydney, Australia, and again in Tahiti. He landed at the port of Lahaina on the island of Maui in the Kingdom of Hawaii on January 20, 1850, on the British Brigantine Cheerful, along with three others: Theodore Christopher Heuch, age 20, a German carpenter, Fredrich Sockyer, age 25 a British grazier and also Edmund Sockyer, age 34, a British grazier. Rudolph Meyer listed his occupation as a surveyor.

Meyer spoke German, French, and English and soon wrote and spoke the Hawaiian language. He found his way to the island of Molokaʻi instead of continuing to California. On Molokaʻi he met Reverend Harvey Rexford Hitchcock, who accepted him as a house guest at his missionary station known as Kalua'aha on the east coast of Molokaʻi. While living with Reverend Hitchcock he met High Chiefess Kalama Waha (1832–1899). She was a student of the Hitchcocks at the time. Kalama's father was Apahu Waha and her mother was Akela Hu'a. She was named after Kalama-A-Kuakini, an aliʻi (member of the royal family) from Maui related to High Chief Kalanimoku. Kalama also had a sister, Maraea Apahu and two brothers, one named William and the other, Ka-Waha O Kalola. The two boys were interested in Christianity and became missionaries and went to Tahiti as young men to do missionary work. Meyer married Kalama Waha on March 20, 1851 when she was 18 years old. As a foreigner marrying a citizen of the kingdom of Hawaii, Meyer was required to post a $1000 bond before he could obtain permission to marry Kalama Dorcas Waha. He also became a citizen of the kingdom on July 21, 1851.

Meyer and Kalama lived for a while with the Hitchcocks where they had their first child, Emma Amalia (Meyer) Duncan (November 20, 1851 – August 5, 1932), and then they moved to another location in Kaluaʻaha. Sometime later he moved his family to Honolulu where he worked for Austin and Becker at an office located on Maunakea Street.

== The family business ==
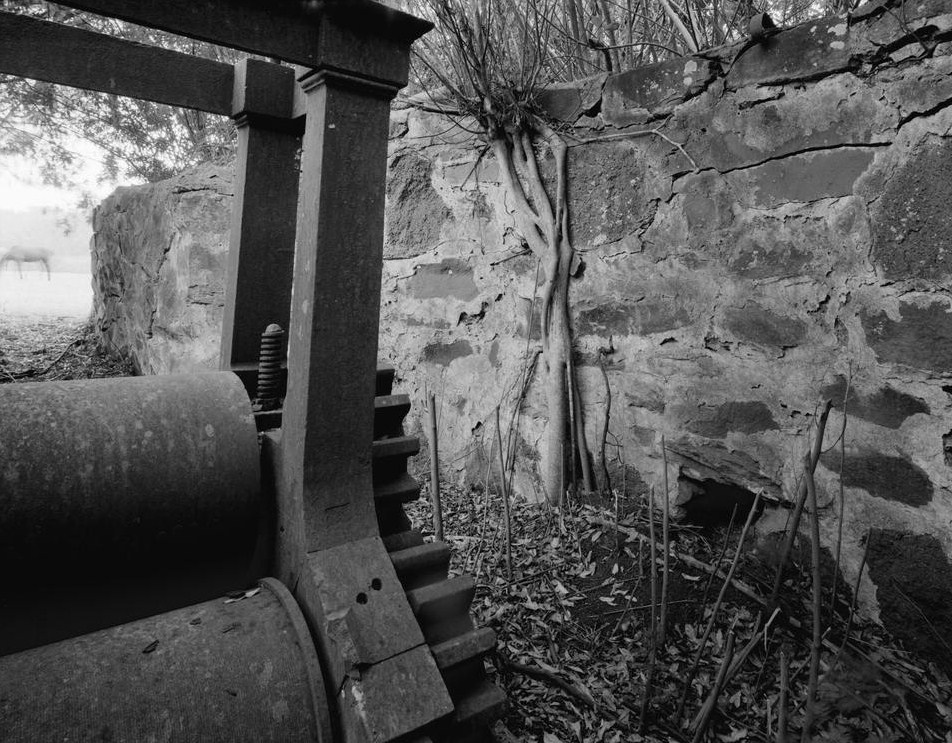
Three-roller sugar mill

Meyer returned to Molokaʻi in 1853 to establish a family homestead in the remote north central area known as Kalaʻe which means "the clearness" in the Hawaiian language. In 1866 he became the surveyor for the island, with the titles Commissioner of Fences and Road Supervisor. About this time, the Kalaupapa peninsula just to the north of the Meyer homestead and below a steep cliff, was converted into a leper colony. He acted as supply agent to the colony, and liaison to the few healthy people willing to work there, such as Father Damien (1840–1889).

Meyer and his sons established and grew a business. Crops included corn, wheat, Brynn, and beans as well as traditional Hawaiian taro. After the Reciprocity Treaty of 1875 removed tariffs on sugar exports to the United States, he operated a sugar mill from 1876 to 1889. Since he did not have the large cash investments of planters on other islands, only about 30 acres (12 ha) of sugarcane were cultivated, and the mill was built with older 1850s technology. The mill used animal power instead of steam. About 50 short tons (45 t) of sugar were produced a year. He was the first on Molokaʻi to grow and mill sugar and coffee commercially and he exported these to Honolulu and California. King Kamehameha V hired the family to manage a vast ranch on the western end of the island called Molokai Ranch. He operated a dairy which produced butter sold locally and sent to California.

== Legacy ==
- R. W. Meyer, Sugar Mill
- U.S. National Register of Historic Places
- Location: Hawaii Route 470; Kalaʻe, Hawaii
- Area: 2 acres (0.81 ha)
- Built: 1876
- NRHP reference No.: 79000762
- Added to NRHP: September 4, 1979

The Meyers had six sons and five daughters. The oldest son Otto Samuel Meyer was born on March 2, 1854, and married Maggie Ann McCorriston in December 1889. He served as accountant of the business, took over leadership after his father died in 1897, and died February 26, 1931. His sixth child, daughter Bertha Amalia Meyer was born December 9, 1860, and died young May 7, 1866. His tenth child, also named Bertha Amalia, was born June 20, 1868, married Authur Aubrey, and died April 15, 1965.

His third daughter Hannah Julia Meyer (1866–1912), married another Harvey Rexford Hitchcock (1864–1931) who was son of Edward Griffin Hitchcock (1837–1898), who in turn was son of the original missionary Harvey Rexford Hitchcock (1800–1855). They named their son (Meyer's grandson) Harvey Rexford Hitchcock, Jr.

His sugar mill has been restored into a museum, and was added to the National Register of Historic Places listings in Hawaii as site 79000762 on September 4, 1979. It is the only 19th century sugar mill in Hawaii with its original processing equipment in place. It is located on Hawaii Route 470, at 21°9′39″N 157°0′32″W. In the 1999 film Molokai: The Story of Father Damien, the role of Meyer was played by Kris Kristofferson. A nearby reservoir at 21°9′51″N 156°58′53″W is called Meyer Lake after the family.

The Meyer estate still owns land on the island, although some has been converted into a forest reserve after litigation.

== See also ==
- Sugar plantations in Hawaii
- Coffee production in Hawaii
- Hawaii Hitchcock family tree
