= Meyer Lake =

Lake in Molokai, Hawaii, United States

- Location within Hawaii Location within Pacific Ocean
- Location: Molokaʻi
- Coordinates: 21°09′53″N 156°58′51″W
- Type: perched pond
- Primary inflows: surface runoff
- Catchment area: 100 acres (40 ha)
- Basin countries: United States
- Surface area: 8.4 acres (3.4 ha)–10.3 acres (4.2 ha)
- Average depth: 5 ft (1.5 m)
- Max. depth: 5 ft (1.5 m)
- Surface elevation: 2,000 ft (610 m)

Meyer Lake is a shallow pond covering 8.4 acres (3.4 ha) on the northern part of the island of Molokaʻi, Hawaii. It is primarily fed by surface runoff and submerged springs and is located south of Kalaupapa at an altitude of 2,000 ft (610 m). The lake is named after Rudolph Wilhelm Meyer.

The lake occupies a shallow depression on the andesite lava of the upper member of the East Molokaʻi Volcano, at the southeastern foot of Puʻu ʻŌlelo cinder cone. It is a perched pond, held at that level by impermeable underlying andesite and weathered soils. It takes runoff water from a surrounding catchment of approximately 100 acres. A small dam about 6 ft high has slightly increased the pond’s capacity. The depth varies seasonally but has been recorded as being no greater than 5 ft. The pond area ranges from about 8.4 to 10.3 acres depending on the water stage of Molokaʻi.

Meyer Lake is one of the only water catchments on Molokaʻi, the other being Kauhakō Crater lake.

== Geology and soil ==
The soils surrounding Meyer Lake are highly weathered tropical soils with a high content of iron oxide and humic substances characterized by a lack of distinct soil horizons. The soil is classified as belonging to the ferruginous humic latosol group and has accumulated iron and titanium oxides near the surface, forming titaniferous‑ferruginous laterites. These soils typically form in regions with alternating wet and dry seasons and often show concentrations of iron and titanium oxides, sometimes forming concretions, in the surface horizons. The process of laterization occurs when silica is leached out while iron and aluminum are concentrated.

Between 1952–1953, shrubs such as guava were cleared for pasture improvement, exposing areas of extremely high titanium content. Indurate, dehydrated soil areas are grayish‑purple in color, in contrast to the reddish-brown surrounding soils. These areas contain numerous magnetic ferruginous concretions, indicating movement and redeposition of iron by percolating water. Erosion also transports soil aggregates to the foot of nearby slopes.

Chemical analyses have measured high iron oxide (~74%) and titanium oxide (~21 %) in the concretions. Along the shoreline these have lower titanium content but high iron oxide, reflecting sediment sorting and accumulation by wave action. Studies of molecular ratios suggest that titanium oxide increases with dehydration of the soil, while ferric oxide accumulates in the hardened concretions.

== Bibliography ==
- Carson, M. H. (1920). Hawaii Water Resources Bulletin. Honolulu, HI: U.S. Geological Survey. p. 50.
- Ward, Greg (2002). The Rough Guide to Hawaii (3rd ed.). Rough Guides. p. 397.
- Sherman, G. Donald; Fujioka, Judith; Fujimoto, Giichi (1955). "Titaniferous‑Ferruginous Laterite of Meyer Lake, Molokai, Hawaii". Pacific Science. 9 (1): 49–55.
- U.S. Congress (2014). Title 50, Wildlife and Fisheries, Part 17. U.S. Government Publishing Office. pp. 404–428.
