= Hawaii Loa College =

Private college in Kaneohe, Hawaii, U.S.

Coordinates: 21.379497°N 157.783703°W

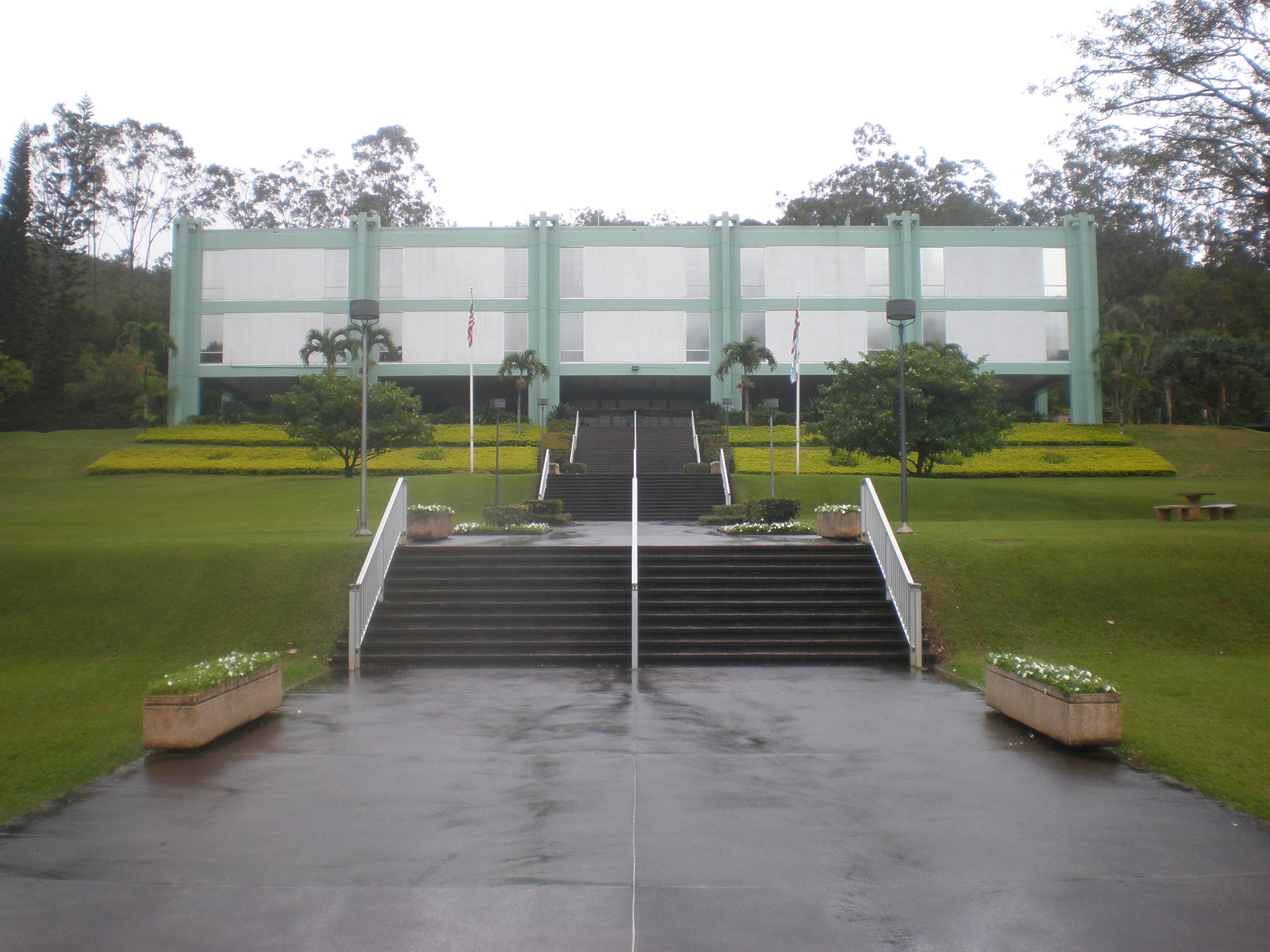
Former Hawaii Loa College main building

Hawaiʻi Loa College was a private, four-year, liberal arts college in Kaneohe, Hawaii. It merged with Hawaiʻi Pacific University in 1992.

== History ==
Hawaiʻi Loa College was founded in 1963 as Christian College of the Pacific by a consortium of four Protestant church denominations in Hawaii, with land deeded by Harold K.L. Castle on which to build a campus. The idea originated with Rev. Harry S. Komuro, then superintendent of the Methodist Mission in Hawaii. The founding trustees were Dr. Joseph Bevilacqua, general secretary of the United Church of Christ; Rev. Frank E. Butterworth, pastor of First United Methodist Church of Honolulu; Bishop Harry S. Kennedy of the Episcopal Diocese of Hawaii; and Dr. William E. Phifer, Jr., pastor of First Presbyterian Church of Honolulu. Other early trustees included Herbert Choy, Frank Damon, Jr., Dr. Wesley Hotchkiss, Ernest K. Kai, and Ted Tsukiyama.

In September 1964, the name was changed to Hawaii Loa College (HLC), a new logo was chosen, and a new motto was adopted: ʻAʻole i kaupoʻo i kaupoʻo ana no ("My height is not yet reached"). A master planning committee was also formed and an architect hired to plan the new campus on 150 acres (0.61 km^{2}) of scenic former Kaneʻohe Ranch land on the Windward side of Oʻahu, looking up at the Koʻolau Range directly beneath the Pali Lookout. The committee chair was Bruce McCandless and the architect was William L. Pereira & Associates.

In May 1965, the trustees hired the college's first president, Chandler W. Rowe, former dean of academic affairs at Lawrence University, who began assembling a faculty and administrative staff in order to be able to accept the first students in the fall 1967. Until the Windward campus opened in the fall of 1971, the school borrowed facilities on the campus of Chaminade University of Honolulu (1967–68), then at 2345 Nuʻuanu Avenue (1969–70) nearer downtown Honolulu. By 1970, the senior class numbered 27 students.

Later presidents include HLC philosophy professor Philip J. Bossert (1978–86) and University of Denver chancellor emeritus Dwight M. Smith (1990–92).

The beautiful rural campus site was both a blessing and a curse. Lack of infrastructure made it very difficult to expand campus facilities to serve more students and raise more revenue, making operations a constant financial struggle. By 1992, Money magazine ranked HLC number 13 in the west among America's best college buys. However, in that same year, faced with loss of accreditation and saddled with $3 million in debt, Hawaiʻi Loa College merged with Hawaiʻi Pacific University.

== Notable alumni ==
- Cecily Byk, painter
- Beauleen Carl-Worswick, Micronesian judge
