= Reverend George B. Hitchcock House =

Historic house in Iowa, United States

- U.S. National Register of Historic Places
- U.S. National Historic Landmark
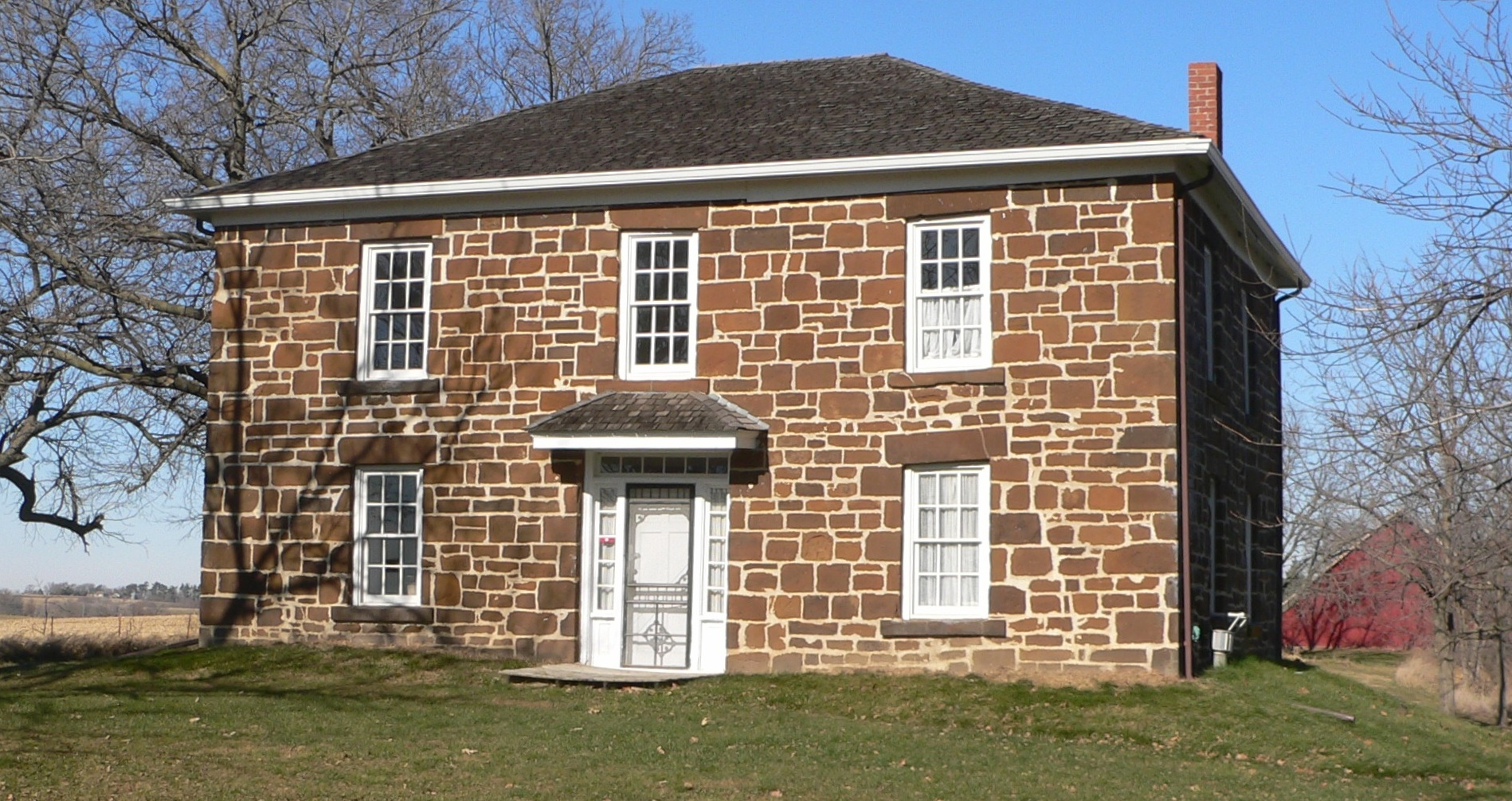

- Location within Iowa Location within the United States
- Nearest city: 63788 567th Lane in Cass County, near Lewis, Iowa
- Coordinates: 41°18′11.7″N 95°6′12.5″W
- Built: 1855
- Architect: George B. Hitchcock
- Architectural style: Federal
- NRHP reference No.: 77000500

Significant dates
- Added to NRHP: November 09, 1977
- Designated NHL: February 17, 2006

The Reverend George B. Hitchcock House is a historic house museum in Cass County, Iowa, near the city of Lewis. Built in 1856 by the Congregationalist minister George B. Hitchcock, it has features indicative of its use as a "station" on the Underground Railway, corroborated by documentary evidence of Hitchcock's involvement in the shelter and transport of escaped slaves. It was declared a National Historic Landmark in 2006. It now houses a museum.

== Description and history ==
The Hitchcock House is located west of the city limits of Lewis, on a hill overlooking the western bank of the East Nishnabotna River. It is a two-story structure, built out of locally sourced random ashlar sandstone, and resting on a rubblestone foundation. Its walls are 21 inches (53 cm) thick, and its interior framing is heavy hand-hewn timbers. Stylistically it is a vernacular interpretation of Federal period architecture. Unusual features of its interior include an apparently purpose-built basement chamber, whose access was probably concealed by a false cabinet. The other basement room is fitted with a cooking fireplace, and was accessible via an exterior entrance and by stairs from above. It is surmised that these rooms were used for the shelter and support of fugitive slaves.

The minister George B. Hitchcock (1812–1872) built the house around 1855 and lived in it from 1856 to 1865. At the time of its construction, it overlooked two major east–west trails, leading to ferry crossings on the river. Hitchcock was involved in the American abolitionism movement known as the Underground Railroad, giving sanctuary to escaped slaves. The property was used as a farm until 1966, when it was sold to the state. It underwent a major restoration in the 1980s, and is now managed by the county as a historic house museum, interpreting the history of the Hitchcock family and the Underground Railroad.

== See also ==
- List of Underground Railroad sites
- List of National Historic Landmarks in Iowa
- National Register of Historic Places listings in Cass County, Iowa
