= Koa Ridge =

Town in Hawaii, United States

- Town
- Motto(s): Live, Grow, Thrive
- Location on Oahu, Hawaii Koa Ridge (Hawaii)
- Coordinates: 21°25′34.6188″N 158°0′21.4122″W
- Country: United States
- State: Hawaii
- City & County: Honolulu

Area
  - Total: 0.90 sq mi (2.33 km^{2})
  - Land: 0.90 sq mi (2.33 km^{2})
  - Water: 0 sq mi (0.0 km^{2})
- Elevation: 446 ft (136 m)
- Time zone: UTC-10 (Hawaiʻi-Aleutian)
- ZIP code: 96797
- Area code: 808

Koa Ridge is a town being developed by Castle & Cooke located near the center of the island of Oʻahu in City and County of Honolulu, Hawaiʻi, United States.

== History ==
Koa Ridge sits on former plantation fields owned by Castle & Cooke, which began planning for its development in the late 1990s. It is a planned community south of Mililani Town and north of Waipio. It was originally planned to have Koa Ridge Makai on the west side of interstate H2 and Koa Ridge Mauka on the east side of interstate H2. However, through project opposition and delays, only Makai is being developed. It is situated about 9 miles (15 km) northwest of the center of Honolulu. The ground was broken for Koa Ridge on November 2, 2017. The first homeowners moved into Koa Ridge in November 2020.

== Description ==
Koa Ridge is a town being developed by Castle & Cooke located near the center of the island of Oʻahu in City and County of Honolulu, Hawaiʻi, United States. It is planned to house approximately 3,500 units, a medical center, a community center, parks, an elementary school, and commercial facilities.

== Geography ==
Koa Ridge is located at 21°25′35″N 158°00′21″W, near the center of Oʻahu Island, on the plateau or "central valley" between the two volcanic mountains that comprise the island. It is in the Central District and the City & County of Honolulu.

Traveling north on either Kamehameha Highway (State Rte. 99) or Interstate H-2 connects the traveler with Mililani. Traveling south on either of these arteries connects to Waipiʻo.

The U.S. postal code for Koa Ridge is 96787.

== Demographics ==
Approximately 3,500 units are being developed and 30% of the development is dedicated to affordable housing units following the County affordable and State condominium sales guidelines.

== Education ==
An elementary public school in Koa Ridge is planned to be developed and operated by the Hawaiʻi Department of Education.
