= Windward Community College =

Public college in Kaneohe, Hawaii, US

- Motto: Ka Mālamalama o ke Koʻolau
- Motto in English: Enlightening Koʻolau
- Type: Public community college
- Established: 1972; 54 years ago
- Parent institution: University of Hawaiʻi System
- Accreditation: ACCJC
- Students: 2,705
- Location: Kāneʻohe, Hawaiʻi, United States; 21.4081°N 157.8128°W
- Colors: Peridot green and white
- Website: windward.hawaii.edu

Windward Community College is a public community college in Kāneʻohe, Hawaiʻi. It is part of the University of Hawaiʻi System and accredited by the Accrediting Commission for Community and Junior Colleges.

Created in 1972, Windward Community College primarily serves the windward Oahu region, offering college courses, non-credit classes, and community activities.

Windward CC's strengths are in Hawaiian studies, natural sciences, fine arts, veterinary technology, and vocational training. Most of its students are from the windward side of Oʻahu and transfer to four-year colleges, including the University of Hawaiʻi at Mānoa and Hawaii Pacific University. Key facilities include Palikū Theatre, Hōkūlani Imaginarium (a full-dome planetarium), Aerospace Exploration Lab (a hands-on physical science exploratorium), Lanihuli Observatory, Gallery ʻIolani (an art gallery), and a Library Learning Commons that opened in 2012.

== Campus ==
The campus features the 1998 granite and cast stone sculpture Kulia I Ka Nuʻu (Striving for the Summit) by Donald Harvey.

The college opened in September 18, 1972 in renovated buildings formerly belonging to the Hawaiʻi State Hospital. The five buildings were named after 4 Hawaiian gods, Lono, Kanaloa, Haloa, and Mahi, and former Hospital Administrator Judd.

There were 834 students on February 1, 1973.

In October 2024, the college offer several types of degrees, including an Associate in Arts and Academic Subject Certificates.
