= Samuel Northrup Castle =

American businessman and politician (1808–1894)

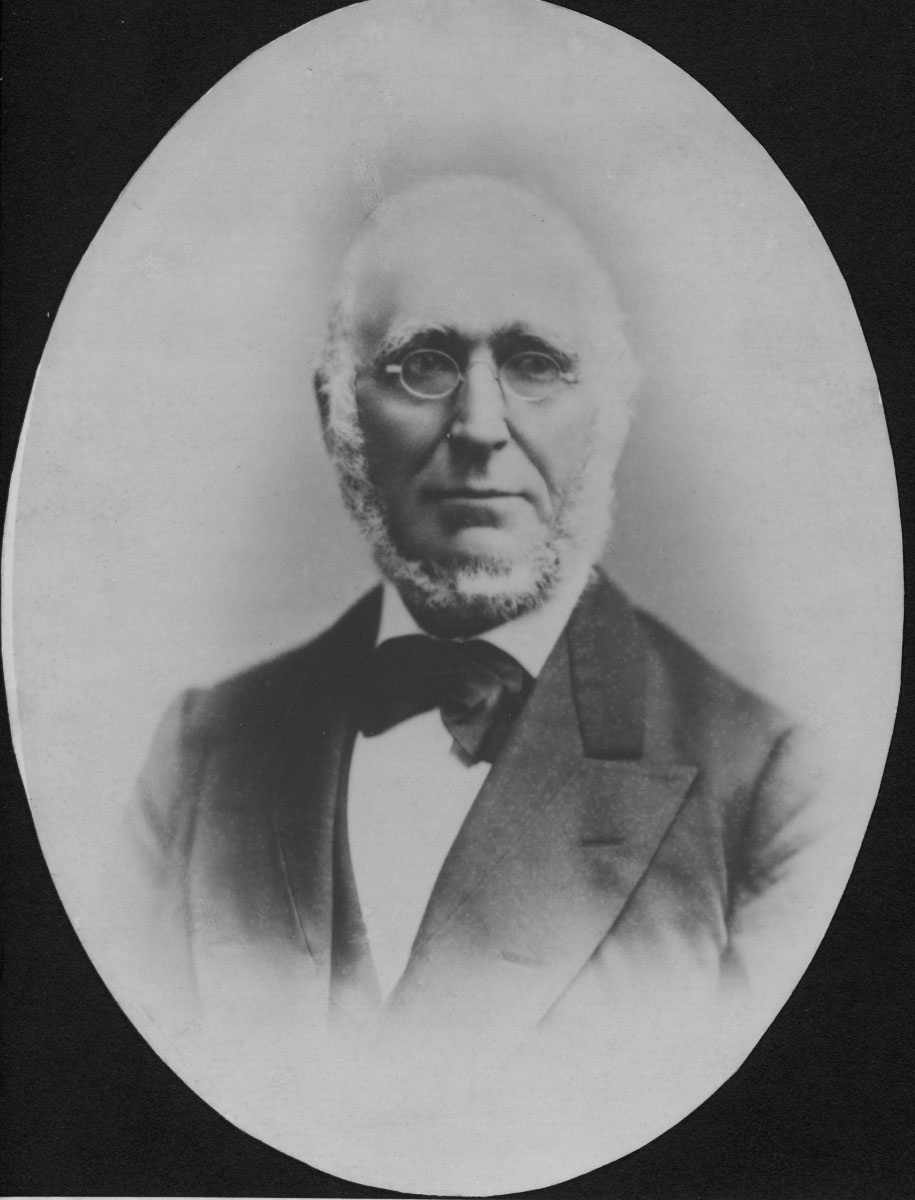
- Circa 1878
- Born: August 12, 1808; Cazenovia, New York
- Died: July 14, 1894 (aged 85); Honolulu, Hawaii
- Occupations: Businessman, Politician
- Spouses: Angeline Tenney; Mary Tenney
- Children: William Richards Castle; James Bicknell Castle + others

Samuel Northrup Castle (August 12, 1808 –July 14, 1894) was an American-Hawaiian businessman and politician in the Kingdom of Hawaii.

== Early life ==
Samuel Northrup Castle was born August 12, 1808, in Cazenovia, New York. His middle name is sometimes spelled "Northrop". His father was Samuel Castle (1770–1847) whose mother was Eunice Northrup (1743–1807), and his mother was Phoebe Parmelee.

He married Angeline Lorraine Tenney (1810–1841). He became a bank teller in Cleveland, Ohio. On December 14, 1836, the Castles sailed from Boston on the Mary Frazier. Juliette Montague and Amos Starr Cooke were on the same ship, the eighth company of missionaries from the American Board of Commissioners for Foreign Missions which arrived on April 9, 1837.

== Career ==
Upon arrival in Honolulu as a layman he soon started to manage the financial affairs of the Mission, while his friend Amos Starr Cooke and his wife opened the Royal School. He was assigned a house originally built for Reverend Ephriam Weston Clark near Kawaiahaʻo Church. He lived there with his family the remainder of his life. Some of the houses in this complex (including the storehouse he managed) have been restored and became the Mission Houses Museum.

=== Founder of Castle and Cooke ===
In 1851 he resigned from the mission and founded the firm Castle & Cooke in partnership with Amos Starr Cooke on June 2, 1851. Initially they ran a general store in Honolulu, and continued to help the missions with financial matters through the Hawaiian Evangelical Association. Agents were hired in New York and San Francisco. Joseph Ballard Atherton joined as clerk in 1858, and rose to become partner by 1865. During the 1860s, Castle & Cooke expanded into the business of selling sugar from the growing number of sugarcane plantations in Hawaii, often investing in them as well. One of the first was Haʻikū Sugar Company on Maui. Haʻikū was later managed by children of missionaries Henry Perrine Baldwin and Samuel T. Alexander who formed their own partnership Alexander & Baldwin. These were two of the corporations known as the "Big Five who dominated the economy of the Territory of Hawaii through the 20th century. Missionary Elias Bond started a plantation in Kohala in 1862.

=== Appointment to the Privy Council ===
Kamehameha V appointed Castle to his Privy Council on December 7, 1863. He was elected to the legislature of the Hawaiian Kingdom in the House of Representatives in 1864. He served on the Privy Council through the reign of King Lunalilo, until February 23, 1874. King Kalākaua appointed him to the House of Nobles in the legislature from 1876 to 1880.

=== Other interests ===
He was a member of the board of trustees of Punahou School when it was incorporated on June 6, 1849. He served as treasurer for 40 years. He was the only original trustee alive for the 50th anniversary celebration in 1891.

== Family ==
His first wife Angeline Lorraine Tenney gave birth to a daughter, Mary Tenney Castle, on May 9, 1838. Angeline died less than three years later on March 5, 1841.

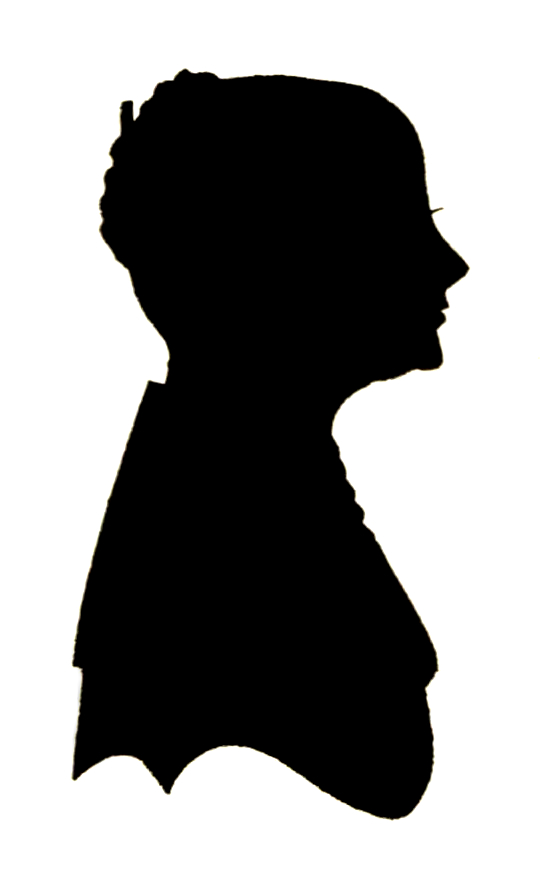
Angeline Castle, circa 1840.

Mary Tenney Castle married Edward Griffin Hitchcock on April 11, 1862. Hitchcock was son of missionaries Harvey Rexford Hitchcock (1800–1855) and Rebecca Howard (1808–1890), born in Lahaina on Maui in 1837, served as Marshal of the Republic of Hawaii, and died October 9, 1898. Their grandson was all-American football player Harvey Rexford Hitchcock, Jr.

He returned to the United States and married Mary Tenney (October 26, 1819 – March 13, 1907), the sister of Angeline, his first wife, on November 13, 1842, in West Exeter, New York. They were both daughters of Levi Tenney (1781–1869) who served in the War of 1812 and Mary Ann Kingsbury (1787–1853). He returned to Hawaii in March 1843 with his new wife.

He had ten children with his second wife:

1. Samuel Castle died young October 27, 1843.
2. Charles Alfred Castle (December 16, 1844 – April 30, 1874) married Claire Eloise Coleman (1847–1917).
3. Harriet Angeline Castle (January 1, 1847 – 1924) married Charles Carson Coleman (1845–1935) on January 12, 1876.
4. William Richards Castle was born March 19, 1849, became a lawyer and politician, and died June 5, 1935. His son William Richards Castle, Jr. was author and diplomat.
5. George Parmele Castle (April 29, 1851 – 1932) married distant cousin Ida Mary Tenney (1856–1944) on October 12, 1875, and had two daughters.
6. Albert Tyler Castle (December 5, 1853 – November 14, 1864) died before his 11th birthday.
7. James Bicknell Castle (November 27, 1855 – April 4, 1918) greatly expanded Castle & Cooke in the sugar and railroad industries. James B. Castle High School is named for him. He married Julia White and had son Harold Kainalu Long Castle (1886–1967) who became a large land-owner and philanthropist, sponsoring the Castle Medical Center.
8. Caroline Dickinson Castle (March 15, 1859 – 1941) married author William Drake Westervelt (1849–1939).
9. Helen Kingsbury Castle (August 5, 1860 – 1929) married George Herbert Mead in 1891.
10. Henry Northrup Castle (August 22, 1862 – January 30, 1895) married Frida Steckner (1869–1890) and then Mabel Rosamond Wing (1864–1950) and died in the wreck of the SS Elbe. Henry introduced George Herbert Mead to his sister while the three were at Oberlin College.

== Death and legacy ==
Castle died on July 14, 1894, in Honolulu. Atherton took over the helm of Castle and Cooke

Most of the family is buried across the street from the homestead at Kawaiahaʻo Church.

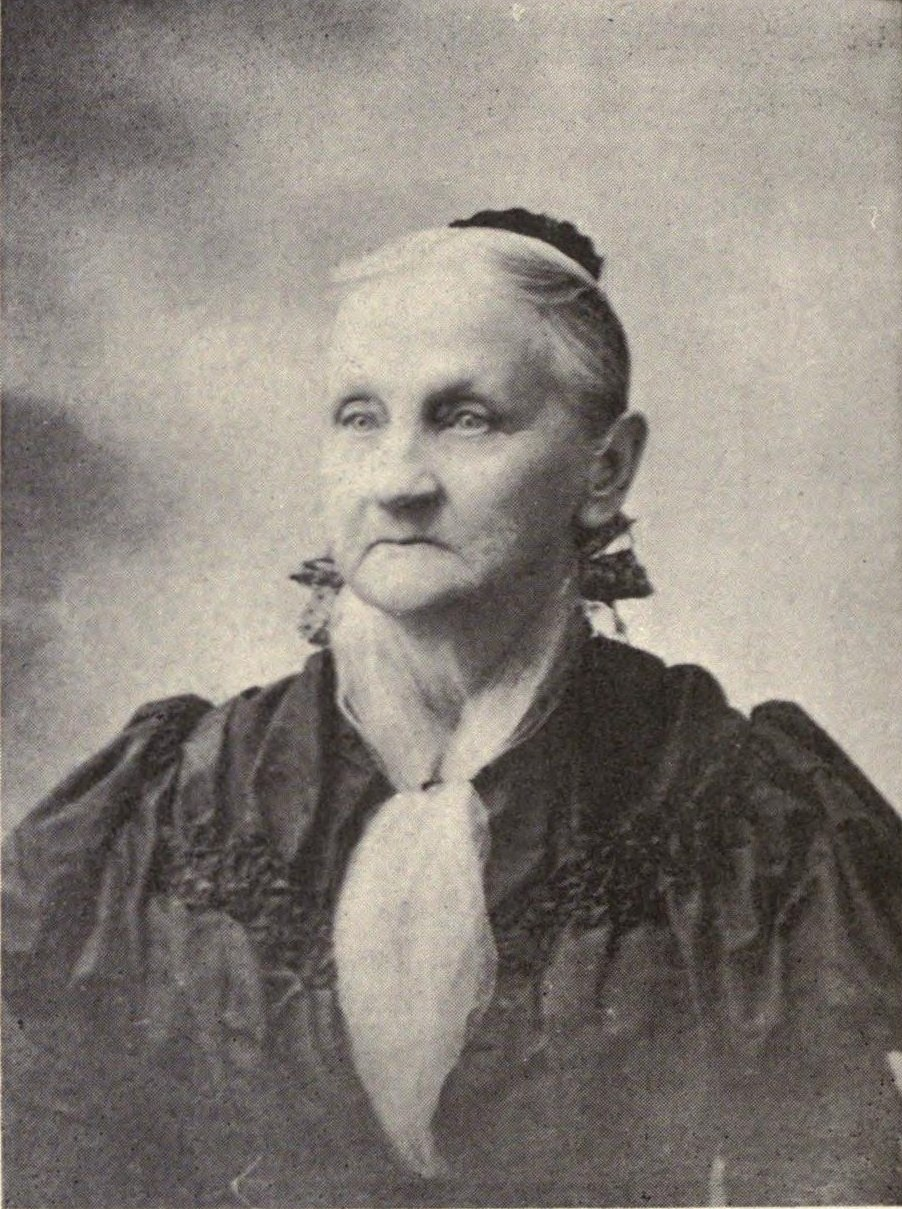
"Mother" Castle 1898

The Samuel N. and Mary Castle Foundation was founded by the family. Mary Castle became known as "Mother Castle" because of her support for education. Many of the early grants were to schools based on the ideas of John Dewey, who was a colleague of her son-in-law Mead. The Henry and Dorothy Castle Memorial Kindergarten was established honoring her son and granddaughter in their former homestead. In 1940, the memorial funded a preschool teaching facility at the University of Hawaii at Manoa.

A more modern and larger house was built starting in 1898 in the Mānoa Valley at 21°18′44″N 157°49′0″W by the family. It was designed by architects Clinton Briggs Ripley and Charles William Dickey, with many additional buildings added through the years. Johnny Wilson was an Engineer for some of the walls. When Mary Castle died in 1907, the Mānoa house was converted into an orphanage. In 1924 some of the property became one of suburban Honolulu's first housing subdivisions, called Castle Terrace. Other parts of the property became the home of the Pan-Pacific Union, founded by Alexander Hume Ford. It was torn down in 1941.

In 1907, a building built at Punahou School was named Castle Hall with funds from the estate. The original Castle Hall burned in 1911, and a new one was built in 1913. Originally used as a girls' dormitory, it was later converted into classrooms for fifth and sixth grades. Former President Barack Obama was a student in Castle Hall for his fifth grade.

=== Family tree ===
Castle Hawaii family tree

Angeline Lorraine Tenney (1810–1841)	Samuel Northrup Castle (1808–1894)	Mary Tenney (1819–1907)
Edward G. Hitchcock (1837–1898)	Mary Tenney Castle (1838–1926)
William Richards Castle (1849–1935)	James Bicknell Castle (1855–1918)	William Drake Westervelt (1849–1939)	Caroline Dickinson Castle (1859–1941)	George Herbert Mead (1863–1931)	Helen Kingsbury Castle (1860–1929)
William Richards Castle, Jr. (1878–1963)	Harold Kainalu Long Castle (1886-1967)
