= Edward Griffin Hitchcock =

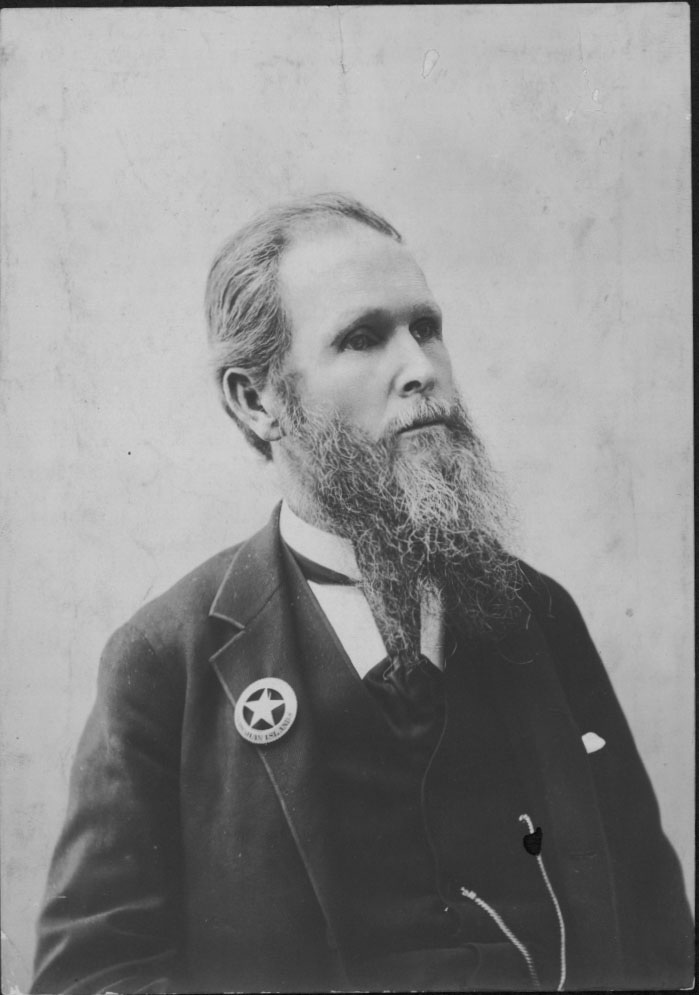

Commander of the National Guard of Hawaii
- In office January 1893 – January 1895
- Preceded by: Office created
- Succeeded by: Samuel Damon

Personal details
- Born: January 20, 1837 Lahaina, Maui
- Died: October 9, 1898 (aged 61) Kohala
- Spouse: Mary Tenney Castle
- Children: 6
- Parent(s): Harvey Rexford Hitchcock; Rebecca Howard
- Occupation: Sheriff

Edward Griffin "Holy Terror" Hitchcock (January 20, 1837 – October 9, 1898) was a law enforcement officer in the Kingdom of Hawaii, who rose to the position of Marshal of the Republic of Hawaii.

== Life ==
Edward Griffin Hitchcock was born January 20, 1837, in Lahaina on the island of Maui. His father was early missionary Harvey Rexford Hitchcock (1800–1855), and mother was Rebecca Howard (1808–1890). They were assigned the mission station called Kaluaʻaha on the eastern end of the island of Molokaʻi. He attended Punahou School from 1847 to 1853. He married Mary Tenney Castle (1838–1926), daughter of Castle & Cooke founder Samuel Northrup Castle (1808–1894) on April 11, 1862. He managed the family sugarcane plantation at Pāpaʻikou.

He was appointed as Sheriff of the island of Hawaiʻi on April 5, 1888. In December 1889, deputy sheriff Rufus Anderson Lyman informed him of the lynching case of Japanese immigrant Katsu Goto in Honokaʻa. Hitchcock tracked down his suspects who were tried and found guilty, but they were later pardoned and freed by the new government. The episode was dramatized in a 2001 play by Eric Anderson "Another Heaven", and a memorial was erected in Honokaʻa for Goto.

After the overthrow of the Kingdom of Hawaii in early 1893, Marshal Charles Burnett Wilson was viewed as loyal to deposed Queen Liliʻuokalani. Hitchcock replaced Wilson as Marshal, the highest law enforcement officer in the country. His effectiveness at rounding up suspects and his ties to missionaries earned him the nickname "Holy Terror".

He lived in the capital Honolulu while serving as Marshal of the Provisional Government of Hawaii and the Republic of Hawaii. One of the first of several uprisings he faced was called the Leper War. He ordered victims of Leprosy to the remote colony of Kalaupapa. Some on the island of Kauaʻi had to be captured by force. The Kalaupapa Leper Colony was considered more like a prison than a medical facility. A leader of the uprising named Koʻolau was dramatized in the Jack London short story "Koolau the Leper".

The 1895 Counter-Revolution in Hawaii, was an organized armed revolt on the capital. After an initial victory by the Royalists, on January 7, 1895, President Sanford B. Dole declared martial law and employed troops and artillery. Hitchcock eventually arrested the leaders and the Queen. Hitchcock resigned on August 1, 1895, and Arthur M. Brown, who had served as Hitchcock's deputy, became the new Marshal. He returned to his island Sheriff duties, until he was appointed circuit court judge of the island of Hawaiʻi in October 1896 replacing Antone Rosa.

== Death and legacy ==
He died October 9, 1898, in the Kohala district of Hawaiʻi island. He and Mary had six children who grew to adulthood. Harvey Rexford Hitchcock was born August 17, 1864, married Hannah Julia Meyer (1866–1912), daughter of German businessman Rudolph Wilhelm Meyer on February 18, 1891, and died August 23, 1931. Their son Harvey Rexford Hitchcock, Jr. (1891-1958) was on the 1913 College Football All-America Team. Mary Rebecca Hitchcock was born June 27, 1866, married Frederick Galen Snow (1858–1926) in 1898, and died October 9, 1958. Harriet Castle Hitchcock was born September 15, 1868, and died August 26, 1933. Edward Northrup Hitchcock was born June 25, 1870, married Clara Louise Fasset and died September 29, 1901. Eloise Tenney Hitchcock was born January 8, 1873, married Frank Tallant Smith in 1895, and died August 31, 1899, in San Francisco. Mabel Winchester Hitchcock was born November 1, 1876, married Bertrand Ferdidand Schoen, and died May 3, 1963. Two other daughters died young. His nephew D. Howard Hitchcock (1861–1943) became a painter in what was called the Volcano School because of the use of the volcanoes of Hawaiʻi island as subjects.

== Popular culture ==
He was portrayed by Johnathon Schaech in the 2022 historical drama The Wind & the Reckoning.

== See also ==
- Hawaii Hitchcock family tree
