= Castle & Cooke =

Los Angeles-based company

Castle & Cooke, Inc.
- Industry: Real estate
- Founded: 1851; 175 years ago
- Headquarters: Los Angeles, California
- Website: www.castlecookehawaii.com/Page/Home

Castle & Cooke, Inc., is a Los Angeles-based company that was once part of the Big Five companies in territorial Hawaii. The company at one time did most of its business in agriculture, including becoming, through mergers with the modern Dole Food Company, the world's largest producer of fruits and vegetables. In 1995, it was spun off from Dole and today most of the company's business is in real estate and residential, commercial and retail development.

== History ==
Castle & Cooke was founded in 1851 as a partnership between Samuel Northrup Castle and Amos Starr Cooke. It was a department store that sold farm tools, sewing equipment, and medicine. Joseph Ballard Atherton joined as a clerk in 1858 and rose to become a partner by 1865. Over the next few decades, the company invested heavily in Hawaii's sugar industry, running plantations in Kohala and Haiku. Atherton became president after the deaths of Cooke in 1871 and Castle in 1894 when the company incorporated. After the death of Atherton, George Parmele Castle (1851–1932) became president. G. P. Castle retired in 1916 and Edward Davies Tenney became chairman.

In the 1910s, the company, along with three other Big Five companies, invested in Matson Navigation Company. Tenney became president of Matson after William Matson's death. In 1931, the company also bought a 21 percent share of the Hawaiian Pineapple Company, which was later renamed the Dole Food Company. After the death of Tenney, Alexander G. Budge became president in 1935. Castle & Cooke bought the remaining shares of Dole in 1961.

Between 1964 and 1968, Castle & Cooke acquired the Standard Fruit Company, adding bananas and other tropical fruits to its existing pineapple operations. In 1978, it acquired Bud Antle Inc., a California-based lettuce and celery farmer; it was renamed Dole Fresh Vegetables in 1989.

The company maintained Dole's large pineapple plantations throughout the state, including a particularly large one on the island of Lanai, where Castle & Cooke owned about 95 percent of the island.

In the decades that followed, Castle & Cooke began to face severe financial trouble as Hawaii's agriculture industry weakened. In 1985, the company merged with the Flexi-Van Corporation, a transportation leasing company. In 1987, Castle & Cooke acquired most of the Tenneco West agricultural operations from Tenneco. The same year, they acquired the S&J Ranch from Apache. In 1991, the company was renamed Dole Food Company.

In 1995, the real estate operations of The Dole Food Company were spun off as the newly reformed company Castle & Cooke. The new Castle & Cooke was bought by Dole's CEO, David H. Murdock, who remained the CEO of Castle & Cooke.

On May 2, 2012 (made public in June), Oracle Corp. CEO Larry Ellison signed an agreement to buy most of the 6th largest Hawaiian island of Lanai from Castle & Cooke for $300 million (~$415 million in 2025).

In April 2016, a project in central Oahu that had faced extensive delays was approved by the Hawaii State Supreme Court. The Koa Ridge project aims to build 3,500 homes, which were initially valued at $300,000 each. The project broke ground in November 2017. The first homeowners moved into Koa Ridge in November 2020.

== People ==
- Joseph Ballard Atherton
- Charles Alden Black, executive
- Samuel Northrup Castle, founder
- Amos Starr Cooke, founder
