= Ka'elepulu Canal =

Canal in Hawaii, United States

Coordinates: 21.3976°N 157.7258°W

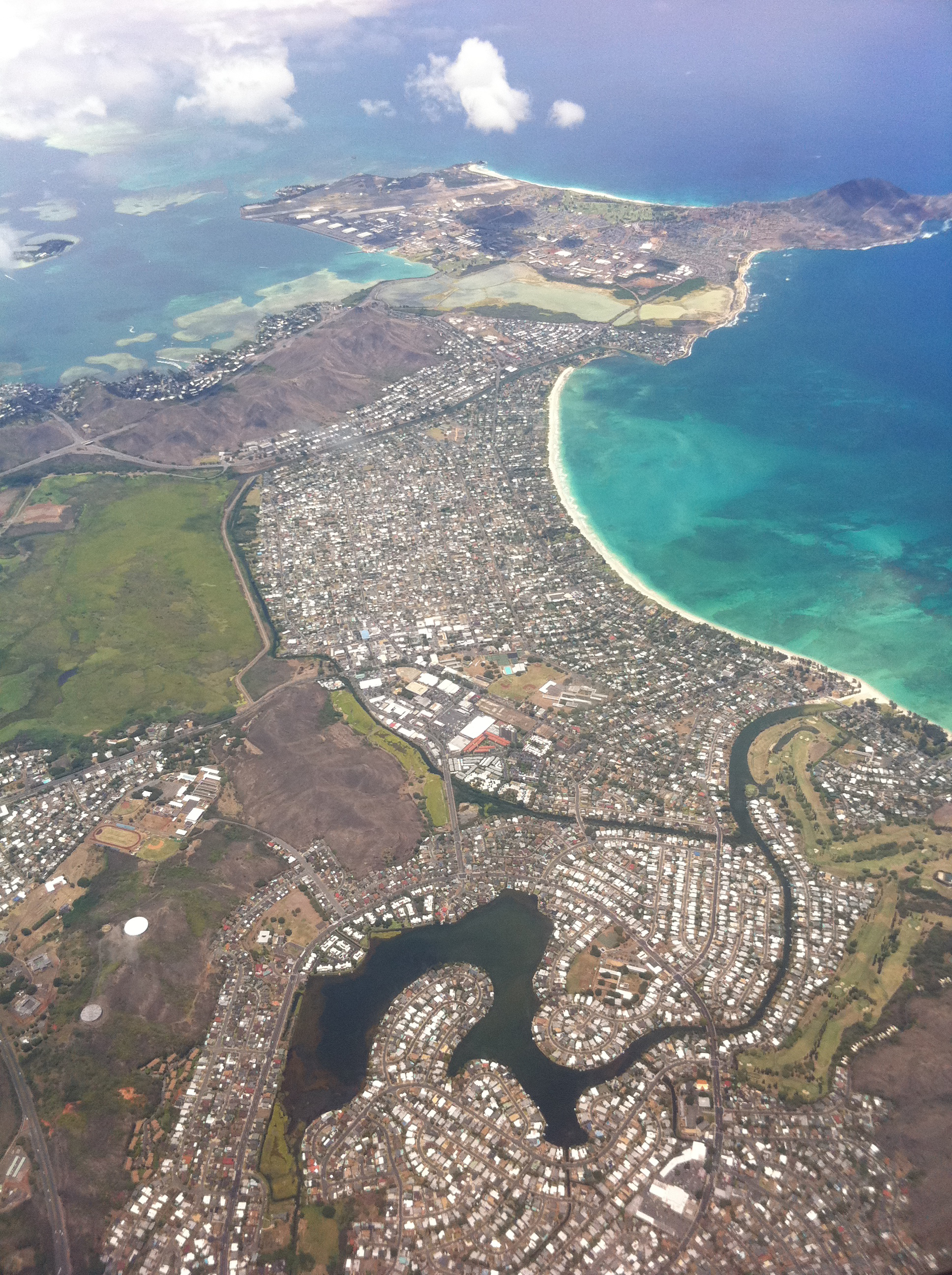
Ka'elepulu Canal running from bottom-left to the sea at top-right

The Ka'elepulu Canal is a canal in Kailua, Hawaii. It runs a mile and a half from Kaʻelepulu Pond to its mouth at Kailua Beach, bordering the Enchanted Lakes community on its way. It is a popular recreation spot but mangroves choke the waterway in some places and the sand that accumulates to plug its mouth must be removed periodically.

== History ==
The Ka'elepulu canal was built in 1966 to manage flooding, drain the Kawainui Marsh and to drain Kaʻelepulu Pond or Enchanted Lake. Today it is bordered by the Mid Pacific Country Club, the Enchanted Lakes Community, the town of Kailua, Kailua Beach, and Lanikai Beach.

There is a lifeguard tower on Kailua Beach near Ka'elepulu Canal.

== Wildlife ==
Its connection with the Kawainui Marsh means fish like Milkfish, Tilapia, Barracuda, Jacks, and Striped Mullet live in it as well as birds like Hawaiian Coots, Hawaiian Stilts, Black Crowned Night Heron, Hawaiian Gallinule, Cattle Egrets, Northern Pintail Ducks, Tufted Ducks, and Pacific Golden Plovers.
