= Hauwahine =

Guardian spirit of Kawainui in Hawaiian mythology

In Hawaiian mythology, Hauwahine was a moʻo and the guardian spirit of Kawainui Fishpond as well as Pā'eo and Kaʻelepulu fishponds.

== Name ==
In the Hawaiian language, the name Hauwahine literally means "female ruler".

== Characteristics ==
It was believed that Hauwahine ensured there was enough food available for the people, but removed the fish from the pond if the people living in the area were oppressed by the aliʻi. She was additionally believed to prevent sickness. Pollution and overgrowth were thought to be insults to Hauwahine, which was one motivation for the Hawaiians to keep the fishpond clean. The Hawaiian goddess Hiʻiaka was believed to have fought all the moʻo except for Hauwahine, for whom she chanted a mele.

Nā Pōhaku o Hauwahine, a basalt outcropping on the west side of Kawainui, was thought to be a favored location of Hauwahine. Yellow grass and rushes were believed to mark her location.

== Bibliography ==
- Drigot, Diane C. (June 1982). "Ho'ona'auao no Kawai Nui (Educating about Kawai Nui) - A Multi-Media Educational Guide". Environmental Center Special Reports. Honolulu, Hawaii: University of Hawaii at Manoa. hdl:10125/18201.
- LeGrande Biological Surveys (October 2017). Appendix B: Botanical Resources Assessment for the Kawainui-Hāmākua Marsh Complex Master Plan (PDF) (Report). Kailua, Hawaii: Hawaii Department of Land and Natural Resources.
