= Kawainui Marsh =

Wetland and resurfacing fishpond in Kailua, Hawaii

Kawainui Fishpond (Marsh)
- Kawainui Fishpond

- Location within Hawaii
- Location: Kailua, Hawaii
- Coordinates: 21.391864°N 157.758028°W
- Type: Wetland

Ramsar Wetland
- Official name: Kawainui and Hamakua Marsh Complex
- Designated: 2 February 2005
- Reference no.: 1460

Kawainui Fishpond or Kawainui Marsh is a wetland and resurfacing fishpond in Kailua, Hawaiʻi. It is the largest remaining wetland and the largest ancient freshwater fishpond in Hawaiʻi, and a designated Ramsar Convention wetland.

== Prehistory and Polynesian arrival ==
Geologic evidence such as core samples containing coral suggest that Kawainui was a wide, shallow bay in prehistory. Its water content peaked c. 1500 BCE, at which point a barrier reef likely grew between the bay and the Pacific Ocean, but did not fully separate the two. Erosion from waves can be seen in certain areas at the edges of the marsh as it exists today, near Nā Pōhaku o Hauwahine.

By about 500 CE, sea level had lowered to roughly the current level, exposing much of the barrier reef. The reef blocked much of the flow of water between the bay and the ocean, causing the bay to become shallower and brackish. Kawainui had effectively become a lagoon, connected to nearby Kaʻelepulu Pond by natural channels. Polynesians arrived in the area around this time, likely settling around the edges of the lagoon near springs. The surrounding area, which had previously been forested, was cleared over a period of several centuries for agricultural purposes. Kawainui was one of the first areas in the Hawaiian Islands to be settled by the group of Polynesian mariners that would become the native Hawaiians.

== History ==
=== Before European contact ===
By 1750, Kawainui had been developed by the native Hawaiians into a 400-acre (160 ha) fishpond used for food. Common fish included mullet, awa, and oʻopu. Irrigated loʻi kalo around the edges of the fishpond, as well as nearby patches of dryland kalo, banana, sugarcane, and sweet potato, served as an additional food source. There were also at least three significant heiau built around the fishpond, including Ulupō. Some evidence suggests that the Hawaiians also improved the channel connecting Kawainui to Kaʻelepulu.

=== After European contact ===
In 1778, James Cook arrived in Hawaii, marking the first contact between Hawaiians and Europeans. European arrivals carried diseases, including measles, smallpox, and influenza, to which the native Hawaiians had no prior exposure and no immunity; the total population of Hawaiians dropped from roughly 300,000 to 50,000 within 50 years. This made large-scale work such as maintenance of fishponds impossible, causing Kawainui Fishpond and the surrounding agricultural area to become unused and overgrown.

In 1848, the Great Māhele and the growing economic importance of Honolulu drove much of the native Hawaiian population away from Kawainui and the surrounding area. The concept of private land ownership was completely unknown to most Hawaiians, who therefore did not file claims for the land they were entitled to. The vast majority of property in and near Kawainui therefore went to aliʻi, especially Kalama. Crops including ʻawa, wauke, and sweet potatoes continued to be grown in the area at this time. Cultivatable areas of the valley floor around the fishpond, which were gradually becoming a marsh, were used as a site for loʻi kalo.

After Kalama died in 1870, her land was sold to American lawyer Charles Coffin Harris, including Kawainui Fishpond which was still intact at the time. Beginning in 1878, water that would have flowed into Kawainui from Maunawili was instead diverted to Waimānalo for irrigation of sugarcane. After Harrisʻ death in 1881, his daughter and heir Nannie Roberta Harris owned the ahupuaʻa of Kailua until 1917.

=== In the 1900s ===
While under Harris family ownership, Kawainui was used for rice cultivation by Chinese farmers; the vast majority of the fishpond was being used for this purpose by 1900, but it was still publicly known as a fishpond. In 1917, Nannie Harris sold her land to Harold Kainalu Long Castle. In the early 1920s, water from Kawainui was drained and used for sugarcane in Waimānalo. Rice cultivation began to decline, and most of the former rice paddies were used for ranching by Harold Castle, who introduced large numbers of invasive plants in order to feed his cattle.

During World War II, Kawainui was used as a training area by the United States Armed Forces, which leased it from Kaneohe Ranch.

In the 1950s, the Honolulu Construction and Dredging Company ran a rock crusher along one end of the marsh. The City and County of Honolulu subsequently leased that area and used it as a site to burn trash until 1962.

In 1956, Kaneohe Ranch pumped water out of Kawainui until the water table dropped by almost four feet, making the area more usable for grazing as part of a land reclamation process that was discontinued in 1965.

The Hawaii State Board of Geographic Names officially designated Kawainui a marsh in 1982. In the early 1900s, it had been inaccurately described as a swamp.

=== In the 2000s ===
In February 2005, Kawainui was designated a Ramsar Wetland with site number 1460.

As of 2019, a mass of peat about four feet thick was covering much of Kawainui. Trees were beginning to grow in it, and papyrus had been seen growing as well. Multiple nonprofit organizations are working to restore areas of the fishpond through traditional practices.

== Wildlife ==
Kawainui is a habitat for native Hawaiian water birds including the four endangered bird species ae’o, ʻalae ʻula, ʻalae kea, and koloa, for which the United States Fish and Wildlife Service identified it as a "primary habitat". It is also used by migratory birds. The State of Hawaii has designated most of Kawainui marsh as a state wildlife refuge.

== In Hawaiian culture ==
Hawaiian legends describe lepo-ʻai-ʻia, or "edible mud", that was present in Kawainui. The traditional story states that Kauluakalana brought the mud from a foreign place and put it in Kawainui Fishpond, and that it was eaten by the servants and warriors of Kamehameha I during his invasion of Oʻahu in 1795.

Kawainui was additionally believed to have a guardian spirit in the form of a moʻo named Hauwahine, who ensured that there was enough food available for the people, but removed the fish from the pond if the people living in the area were oppressed by the aliʻi. Pollution and overgrowth were thought to be insults to Hauwahine, which was one motivation for the Hawaiians to keep the fishpond clean.

== See also ==
- Kaʻelepulu Pond
- Ulupō Heiau State Historic Site
