= Hoʻokuaʻāina =

Nonprofit organization in Maunawili, Hawaii

- Founder: Dean and Michele Wilhelm
- Type: Nonprofit organization
- Location: Maunawili, Hawaii
- Coordinates: 21.373095°N 157.7648649°W

Hoʻokuaʻāina is a nonprofit organization that maintains approximately 3 acres of loʻi kalo in Maunawili, Hawaii. Founded by Dean and Michele Wilhelm, who purchased the nonprofit's 7.6-acre site in 2007 for the purpose of growing kalo. Hoʻokuaʻāina cultivates several varieties, selling them raw, cooked, and as poi. The nonprofit steams and cleans more than 400 pounds of kalo per month.

Hoʻokuaʻāina runs programs focused on mentorship for at-risk youth and hosts community workdays at the loʻi, offering internships.
