= Lanikai Beach =

Beach in Oahu, Hawaii

Coordinates: 21°23′32.00″N 157°42′54.00″W

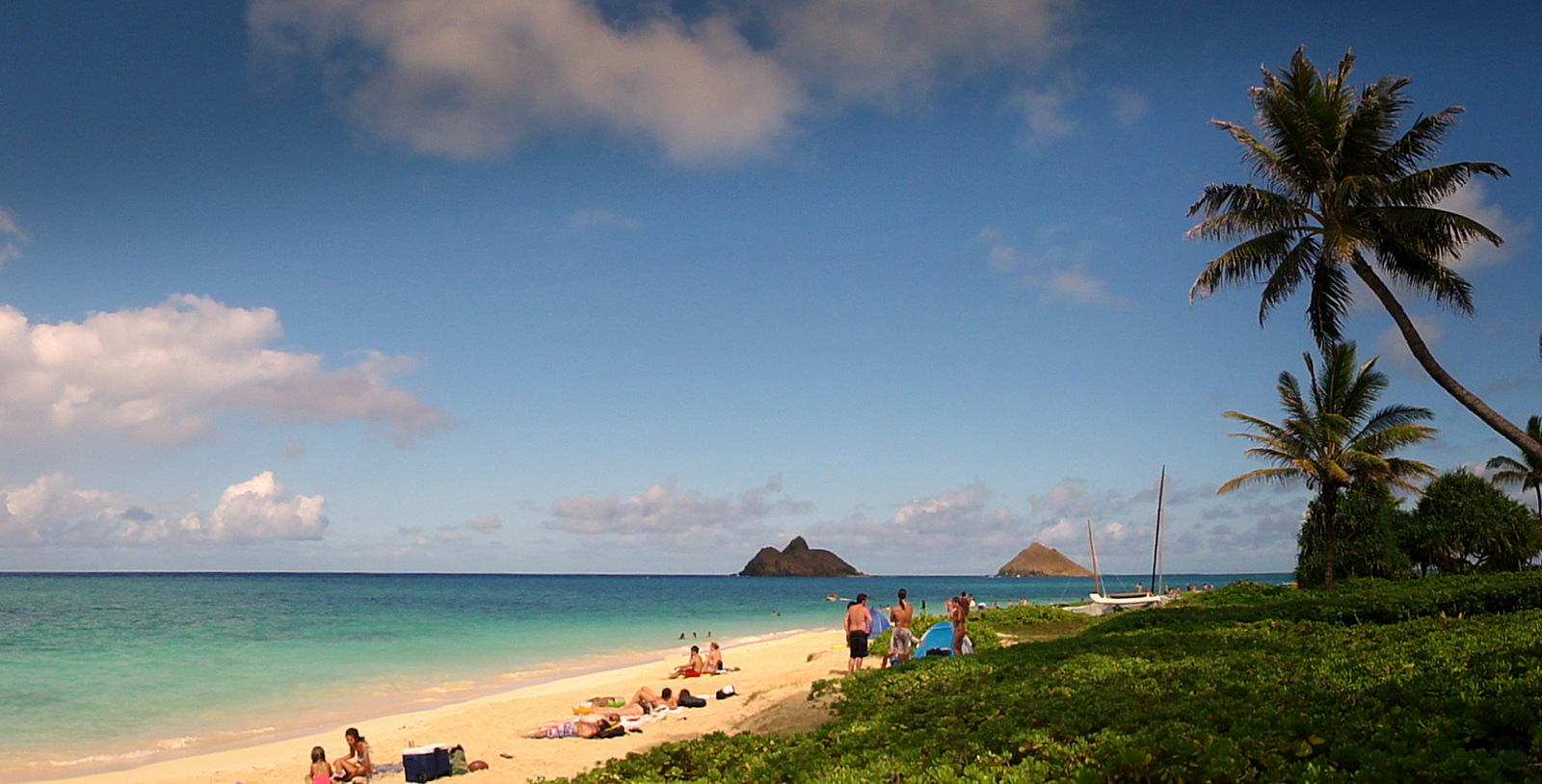
Lanikai Beach with the twin islands of Nā Mokulua off shore

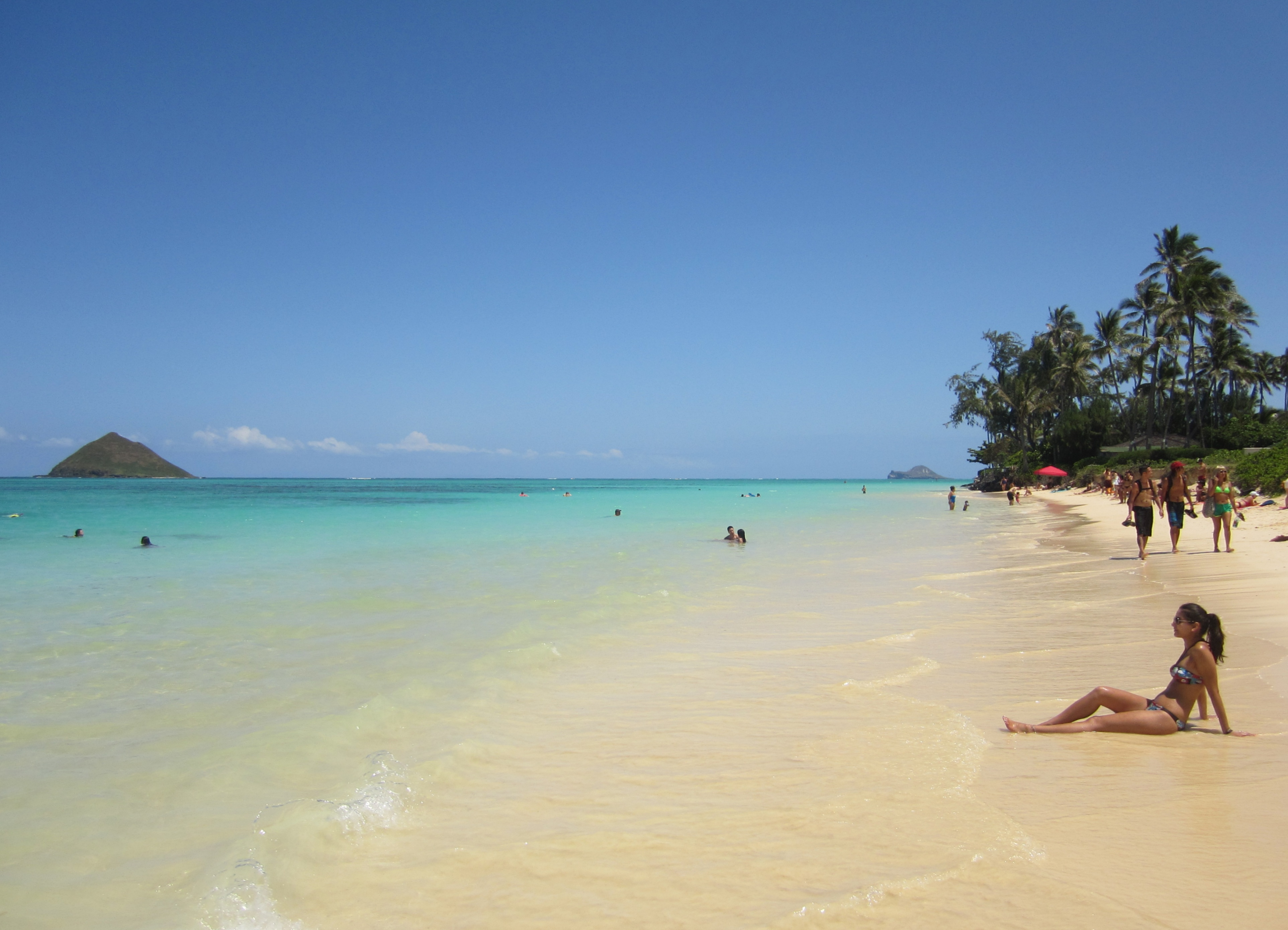
Beachgoers on Lanikai Beach

Lanikai Beach or Kaʻōhao Beach is located in Kaʻōhao, a community in the town of Kailua and on the windward coast of Oʻahu, Hawaii. Although there is a widespread belief that the name Lanikai means "heavenly sea", that is a misconception and a grammatical error, since in the Hawaiian language, the qualifier (lani) comes after the noun (kai). The name Lanikai was invented in the 1920s by the developer Charles Frazier, who owned 300 acres of beachfront property in the area known to Native Hawaiians as Kaʻōhao. This small half-mile strip of beach is consistently ranked among the best beaches in the world. Adjacent to Lanikai Beach is a primarily upper-class residential area and because of this it is accessed through public beach access paths. Although the beach itself is public property, it is not state land and is not a county beach park like many beaches in Hawaii. There is no public parking lot and the area lacks facilities like restrooms, showers or lifeguards. As of July 1, 2014, parking violation fines have increased from $35 to $200 in an effort to keep people from illegally parking in the residential area surrounding the beach accesses. Parking violations are strictly enforced and include, but are not limited to, no parking within four feet of a driveway entrance or apron, blocking the unimproved pedestrian right of way (where a sidewalk would normally be), within 30 feet of a stop sign, within ten feet of a fire hydrant, or on or within 20 feet of a crosswalk. However, there are legal parking areas in downtown Kailua.

During the weekdays, the beach is less crowded compared to the weekends, although it is still very difficult to find parking close to one of the public beach accesses. On weekends, the beach becomes extremely crowded and during vacation seasons such as winter and summer, the beach is almost completely packed every single day. Lanikai is a popular spot for photo shoots as renowned models and photographers frequent the place on nice days. What makes Lanikai Beach popular for photographers is having the two Islands in the background called Nā Mokulua or "the mokes". Kayakers will often row out to land on the larger northern island, but no one is allowed to land on the southern island as it is a bird sanctuary. Water temperatures are generally 75–80 °F (24–27 °C). It has extremely soft powdery clean white sand. Lanikai Beach is regularly voted as one of the best beaches in America and is the only beach in the USA that was voted as one of the best beaches in the world. Snorkeling in Lanikai Beach is a unique experience for visitors as well as locals due to its pristine seas and a variety of marine life.

Due to its position on the Windward or east side of the island, Lanikai is recognized as being a great place to watch the moonrise over the Mokuluas, especially during the full moon. Occasionally during the year the sun will rise directly between the Nā Mokulua islands.

== Wailea Point ==
Located at the southern end of Lanikai, edging Waimanalo, is a location known as Wailea Point. There are hiking trails that lead to pillboxes. Wailea was also a Hawaiian fish god who guarded the offshore waters in the area. The very last residence in Wailea was a historic location notable for being rented by Shirley Temple, as well as being a filming location in Magnum, P.I., specifically the Italian Ice episode. In 2016, the home was remodeled.
