= Ulupō Heiau State Historic Site =

Historic Place in Honolulu County, Hawaii

- Ulupō Heiau
- U.S. National Register of Historic Places
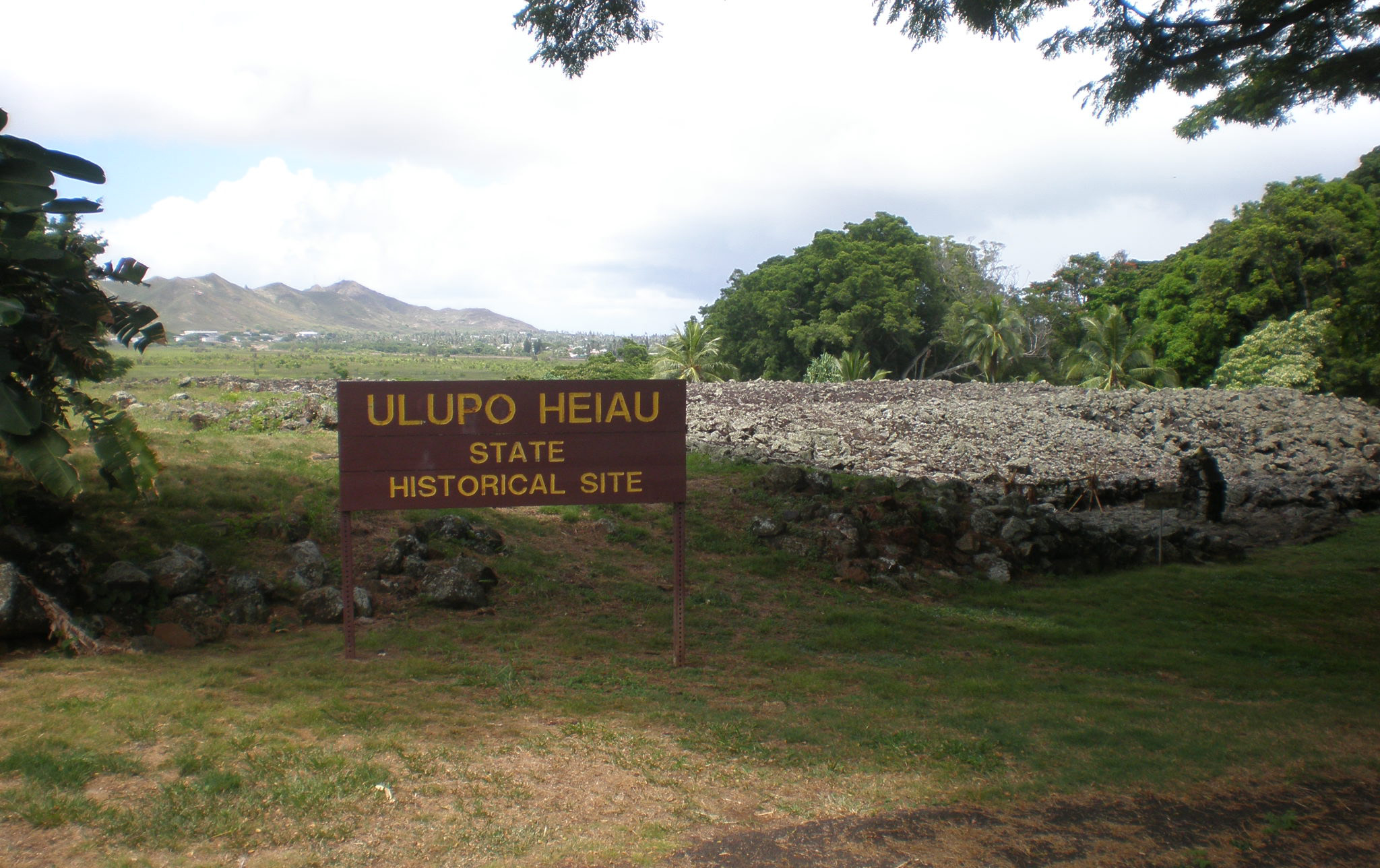
- Top side of heiau platform

- Location within Hawaii
- Nearest city: Kailua, Hawaii
- Coordinates: 21°23′09″N 157°45′10″W
- Area: 2 acres (0.81 ha)
- NRHP reference No.: 72000425
- Added to NRHP: November 9, 1972

Ulupō Heiau on the eastern edge of Kawai Nui Marsh in Kailua, Hawaiʻi, is an ancient site associated in legend with the menehune, but later with high chiefs of Oʻahu, such as Kakuhihewa in the 15th century and Kualiʻi in the late 17th century. It may have reached the peak of its importance in 1750, before being abandoned after Oʻahu was conquered in the 1780s. The site became a territorial park in 1954, was partially restored in the early 1960s, marked with a bronze plaque by the State Commission on Historical Sites in 1962, and listed on the National Register of Historic Places in 1972.

The massive stone platform of the heiau measures 140 by 180 feet (55 m), with outer walls up to 30 feet (9.1 m) high, its size and scale indicating both its cultural importance and the chiefly power of its patrons. Many of the stones may have been transported from as far as Kualoa, more than 10 miles (16 km) away. Although it probably began as an agricultural heiau (mapele) with springs feeding crops of taro, banana, sweet potato, and sugarcane along the fringes of the 400-acre (1.6 km^{2}) Kawai Nui pond full of mullet and other fish. However, the great warrior chief Kualiʻi may have converted it to a heiau luakini, with an altar, an oracle tower (anuʻu), thatched hale, and wooden images (kiʻi).

Kailua, with its ample supplies of pond fish, irrigated fields, and canoe landings, was a center of political power for Koʻolaupoko, which often vied with Waialua for control of Oʻahu. After defeating the forces of Oʻahu high chief Kahahana in the 1780s, Maui chief Kahekili lived in Kailua, as did Kamehameha I after conquering Oʻahu in 1795. In later years, Queen Kalama, consort of Kamehameha III, inherited most of the land in Kailua after the death of her husband in 1854, most of it acquired in 1917 by Harold Kainalu Long Castle for his Kaneohe Ranch. The acquisition of land for Kaneohe Ranch brought about changes to the area due to the grazing and ranching of livestock.

== Gallery ==
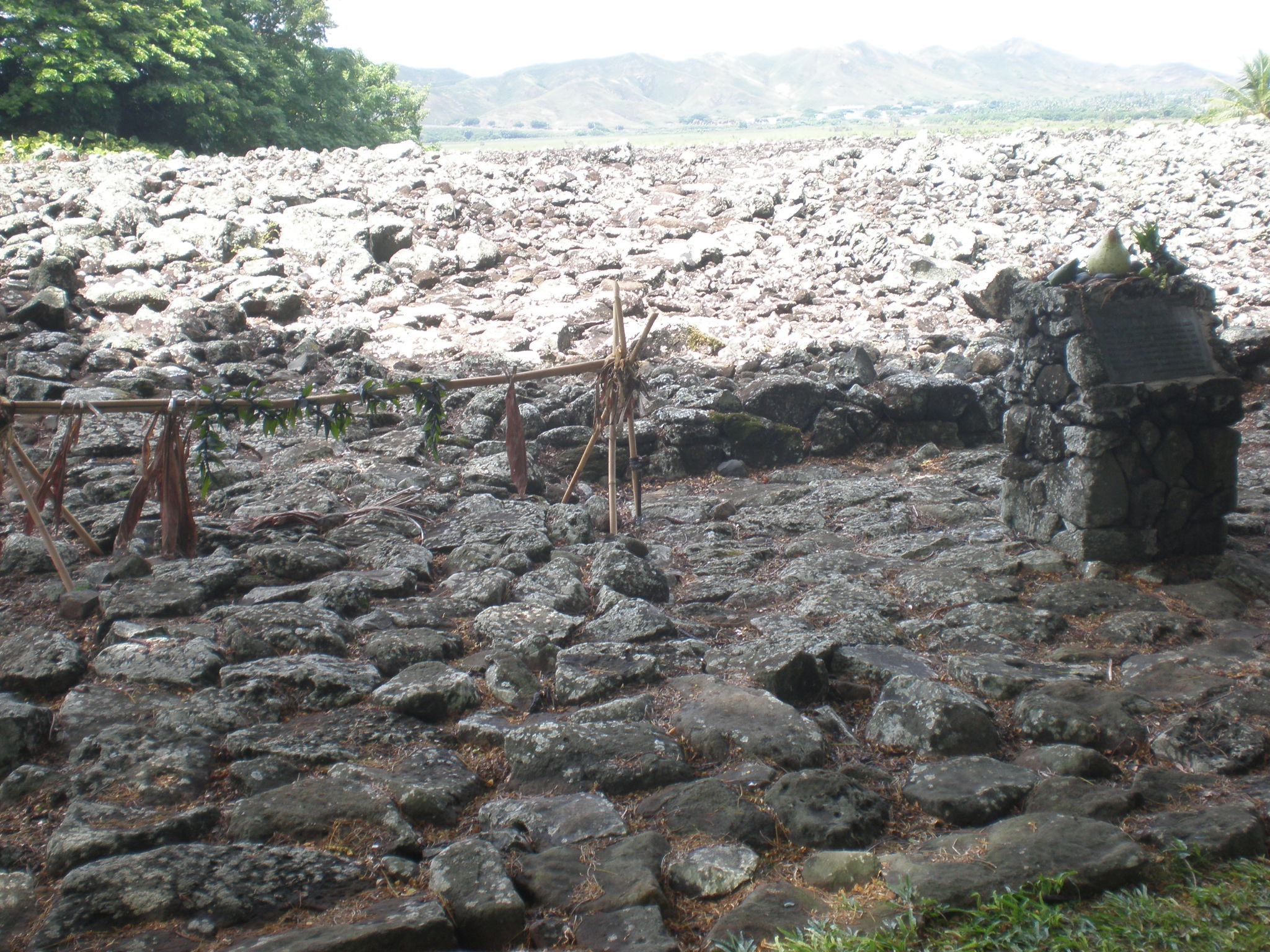
Top of ceremonial platform, with altar/monument

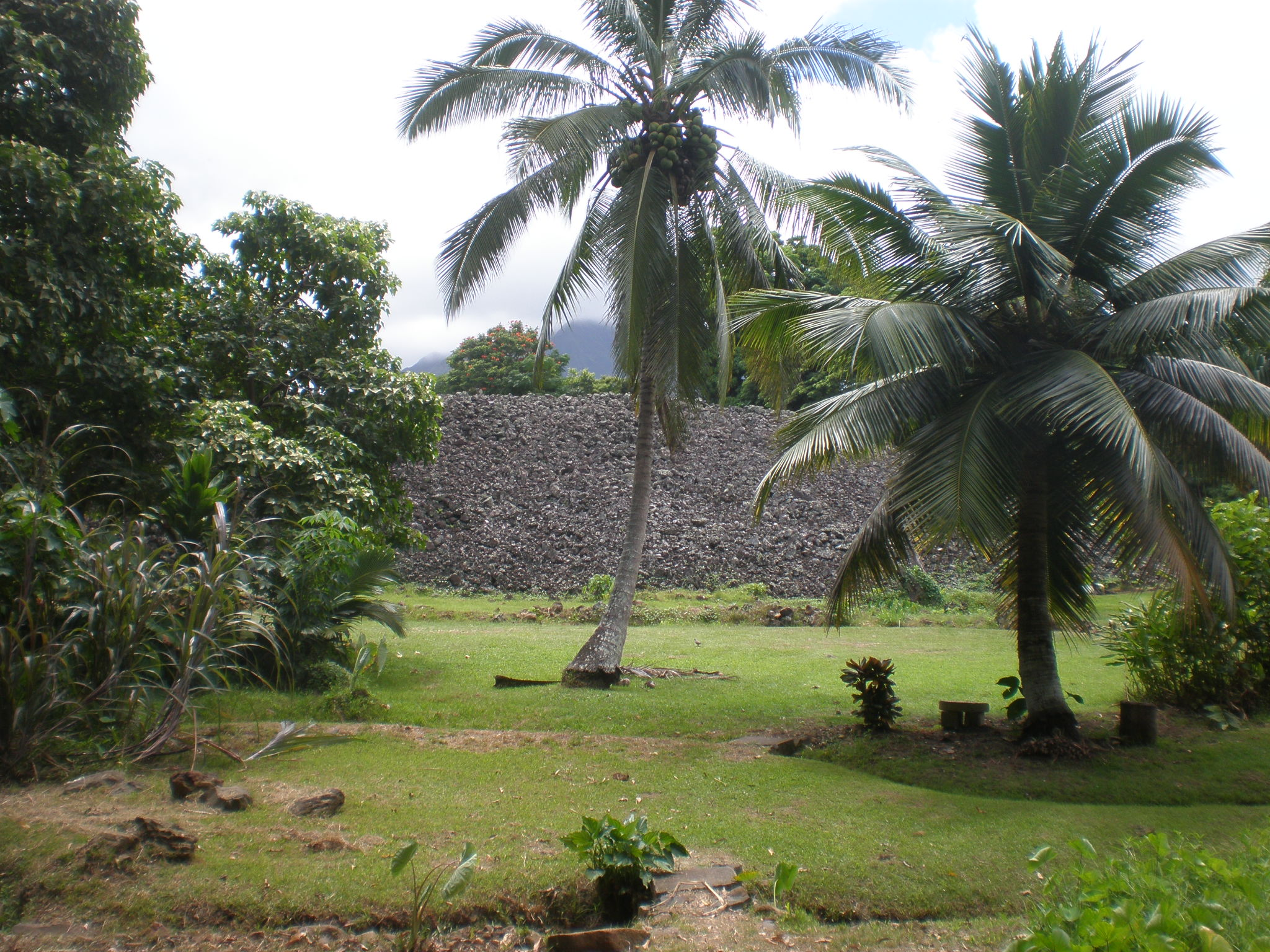
Garden view of ceremonial platform

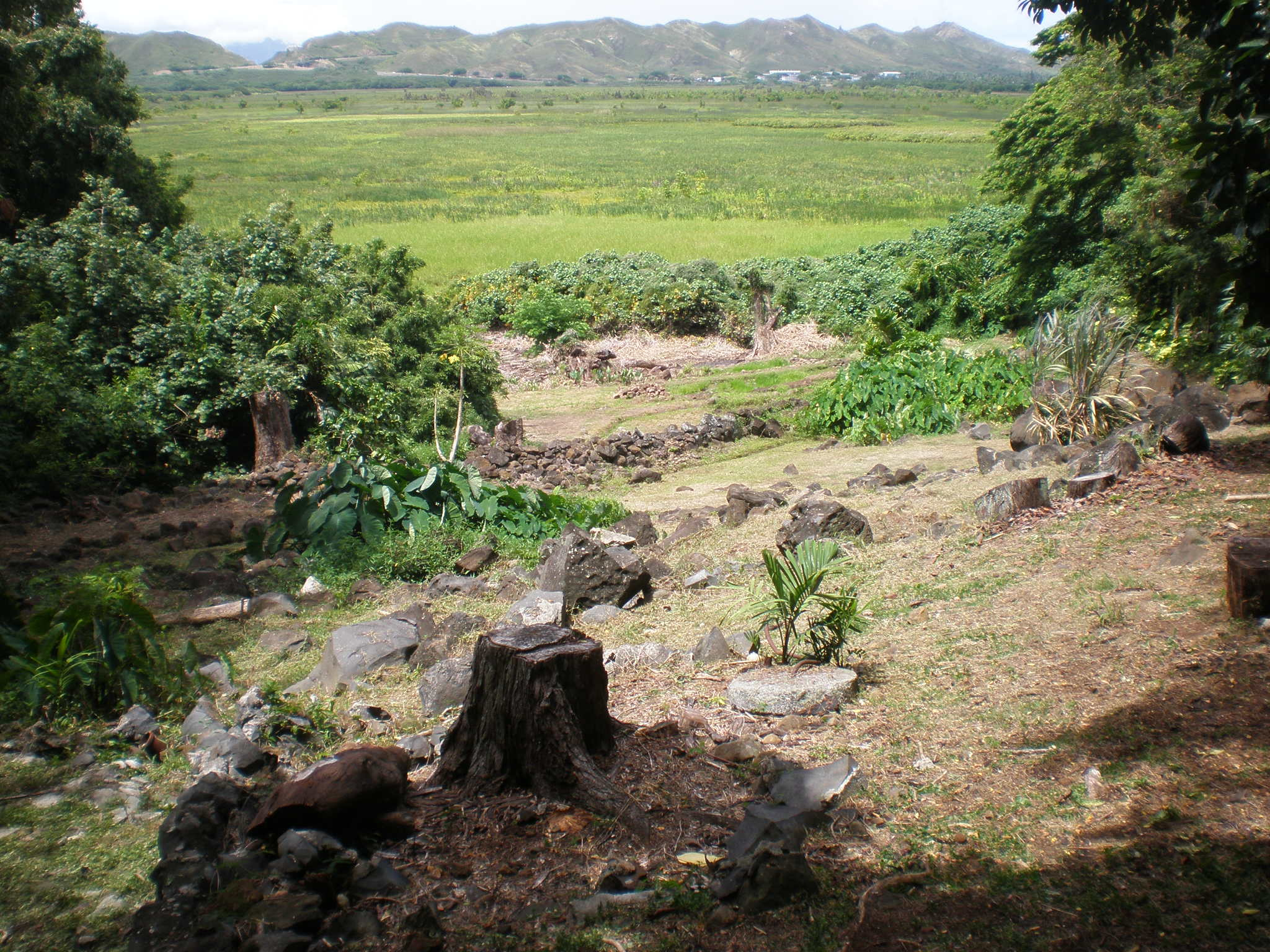
Garden view across Kawai Nui Marsh

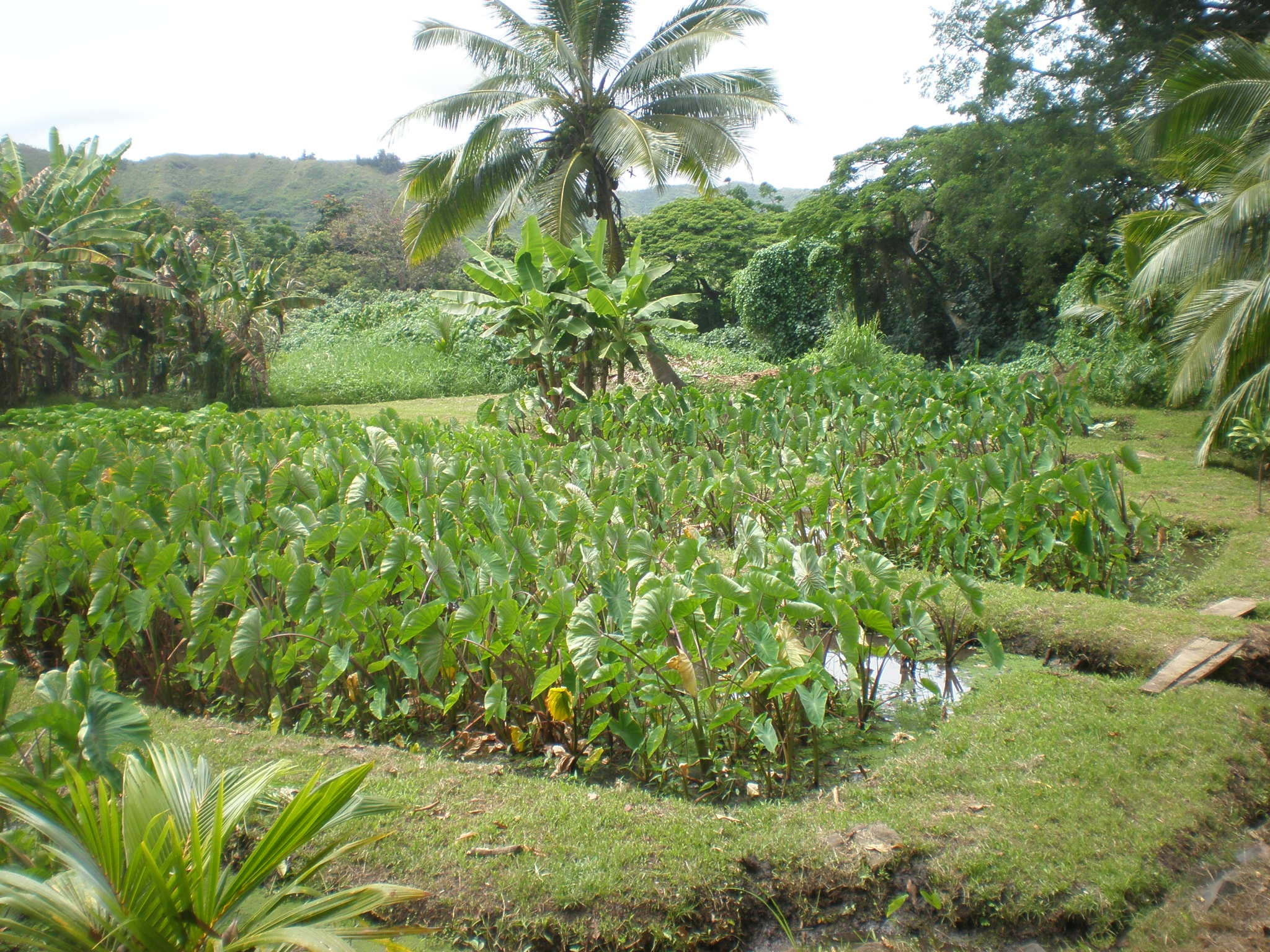
Kalo loʻi
