= Nā Mokulua =

Two islands off Oahu, Hawaii, United States

Coordinates: 21°23′20″N 157°41′56″W

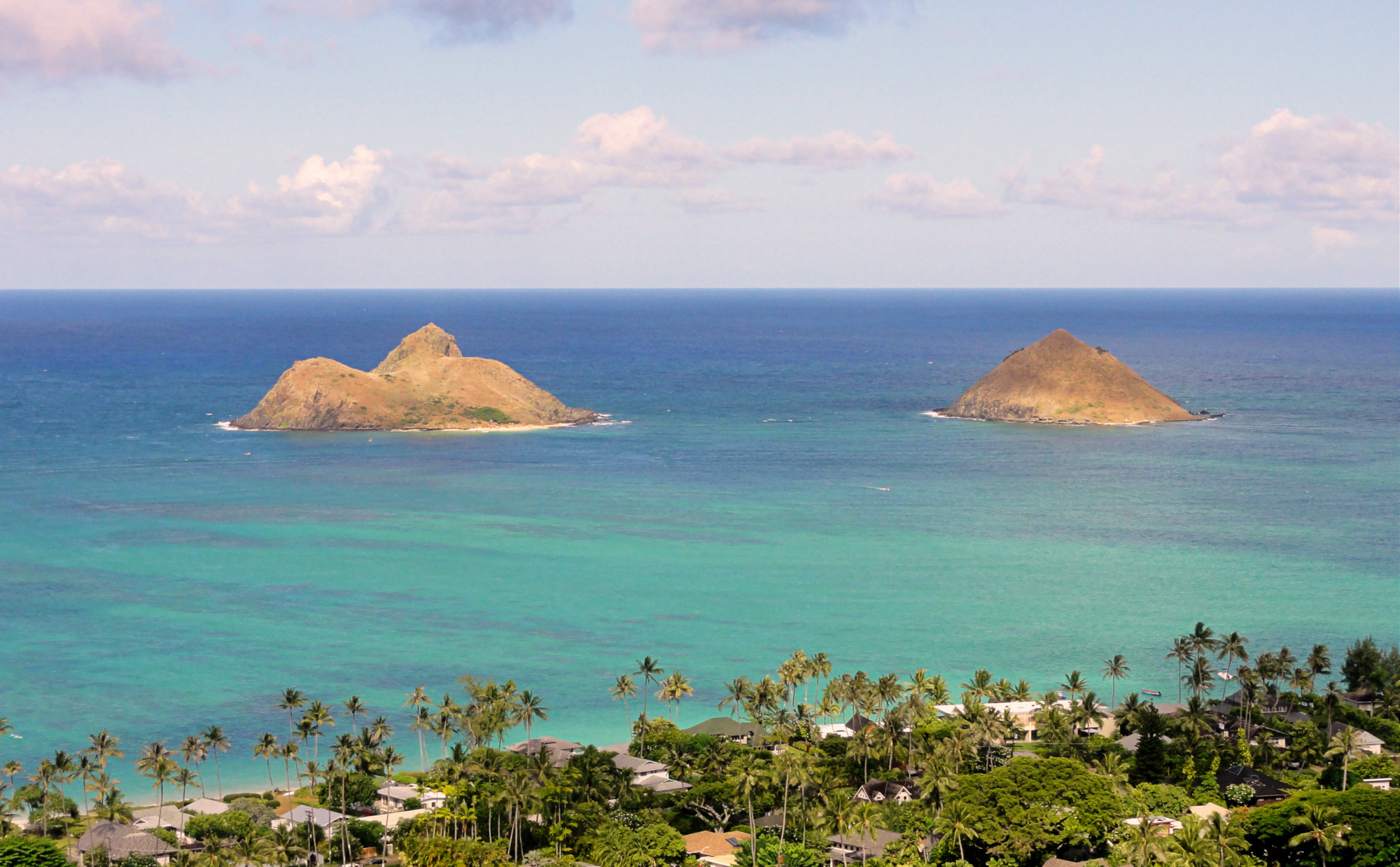
Nā Mokulua as seen from the Lanikai Pillboxes

Nā Mokulua, or just Mokulua (meaning, in Hawaiian, "the two islands"), nicknamed the Mokes, are two islets off the windward coast of Oahu in the Hawaiian Islands. The islets are often photographed and are located about 0.75 miles off Kaʻōhao (Lanikai), a neighborhood of Kailua, Hawai‘i.

The larger island (on the left when looking from Lanikai) is referred to as Moku Nui and the smaller is Moku Iki, which translates literally to big island and small island. Some Native Hawaiian cultural practitioners note that there was likely a non-generic name given to the islands that have since been lost because neither Moku Nui nor Moku Iki are listed in Hawaiian-print newspapers or older maps of the region. They are state seabird sanctuaries, and activities on them and off-limit areas on them are regulated by law. Specifically, the smaller islet, Moku Iki, is off-limits to visitors, as is the interior of Moku Nui. Also, no pets are allowed. Many birds nest in ground burrows on the islands.

The two islands are composed of many basaltic intrusive igneous dikes, often called a dike swarm. These dikes are a part of the larger Koʻolau Shield.

Locals surf the breaks on both sides of Moku Nui and spearfish alongside tiger sharks where they are known to hang out on the ocean side drop-off. On the backside of Moku Nui, there is an eight-foot deep natural saltwater swimming hole known as "Queen's Bath". saltwater kayak and outrigger-canoe tours to the islands are very popular but laws prohibit deliveries to Kailua or Lanikai Beach. In May 2011, a kayak tourist was swept off the rocks and drowned

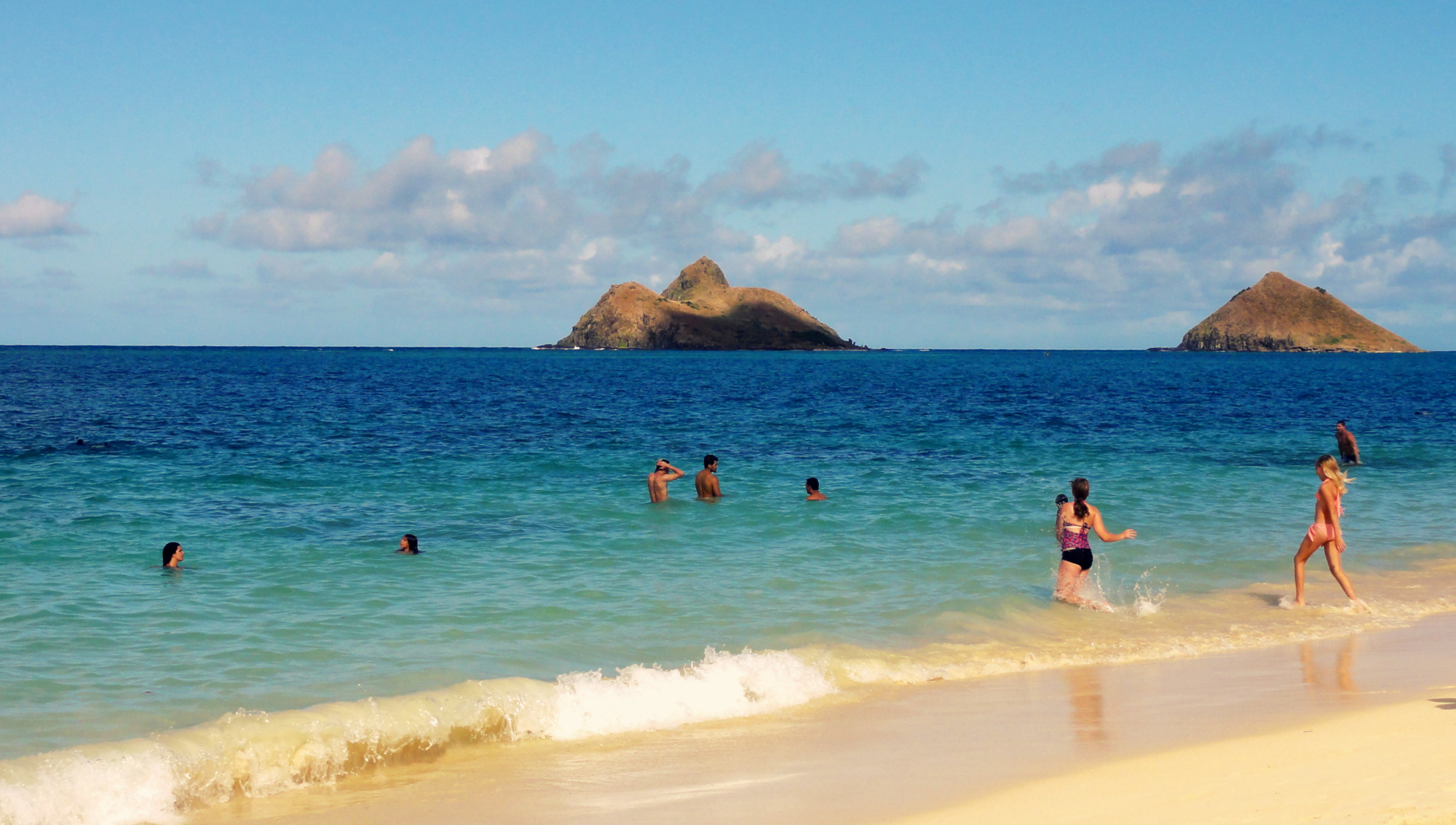
View from Lanikai Beach at daylight

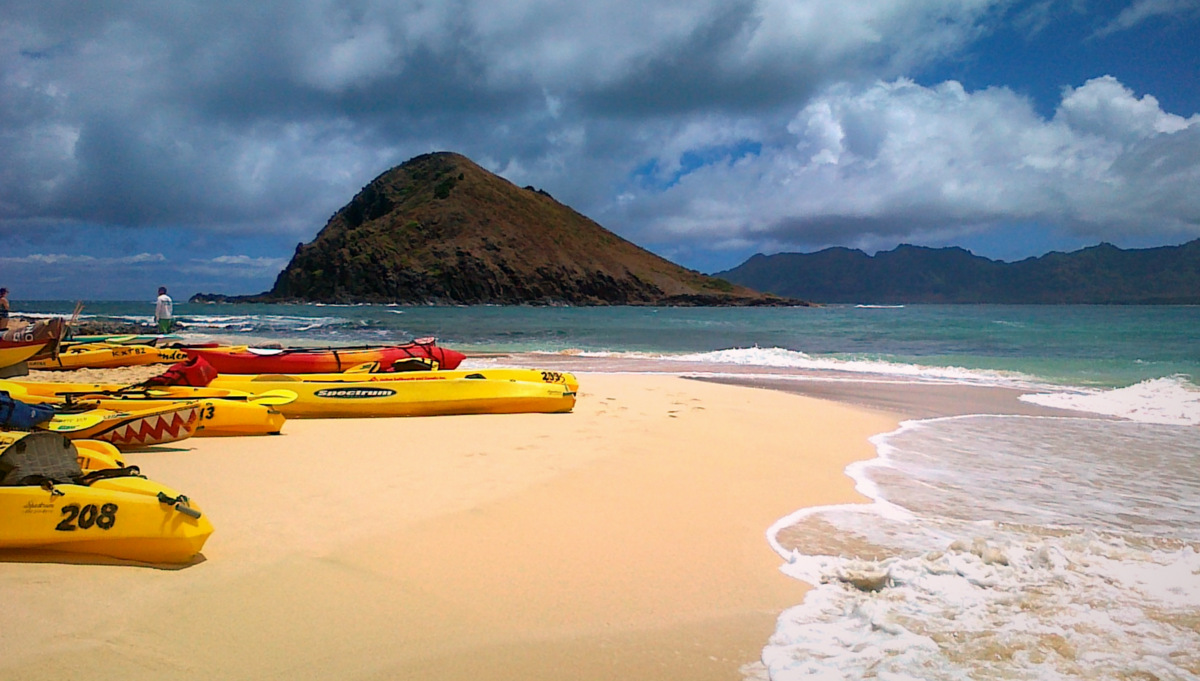
View of Moku Iki from the beach of Moku Nui

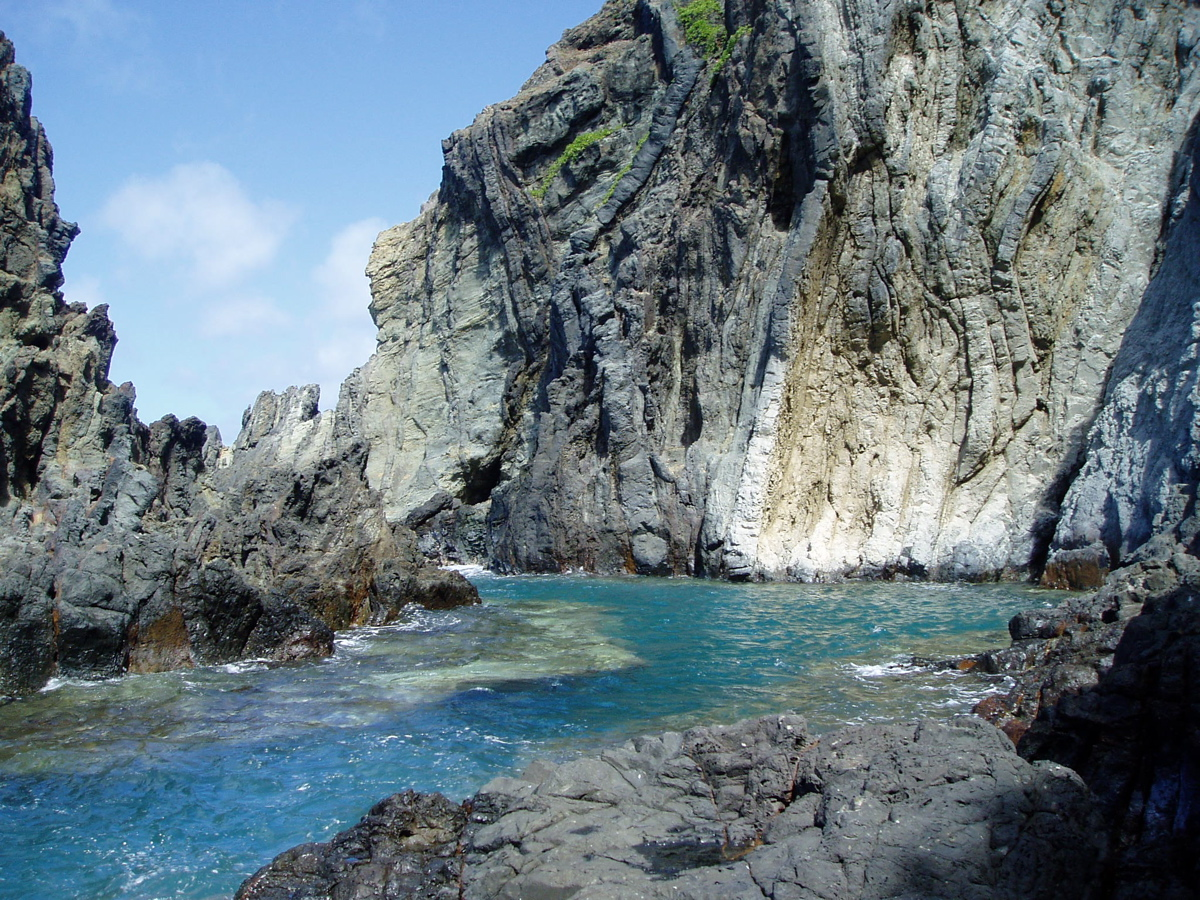
Ocean cove on the north side of Moku Nui

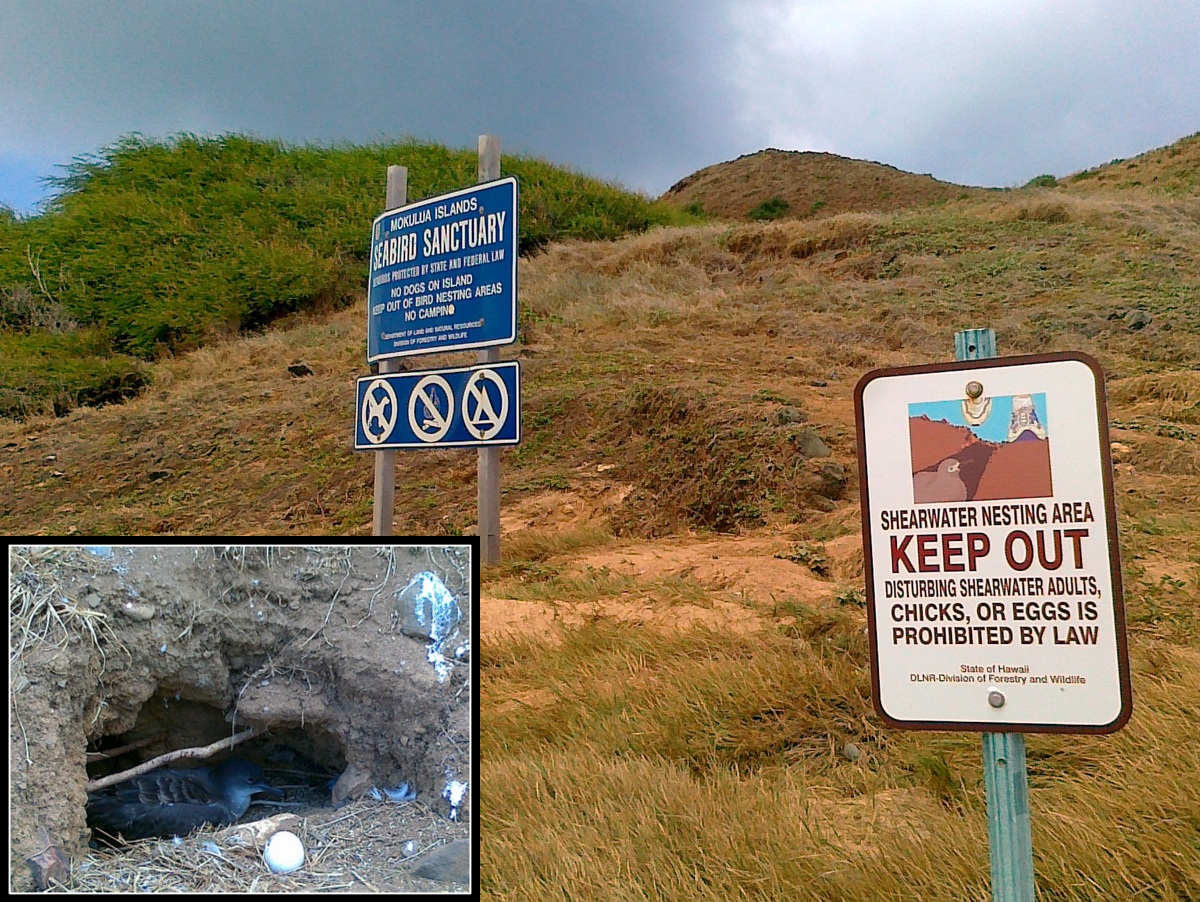
Hawaii State Seabird Sanctuary in Moku Nui

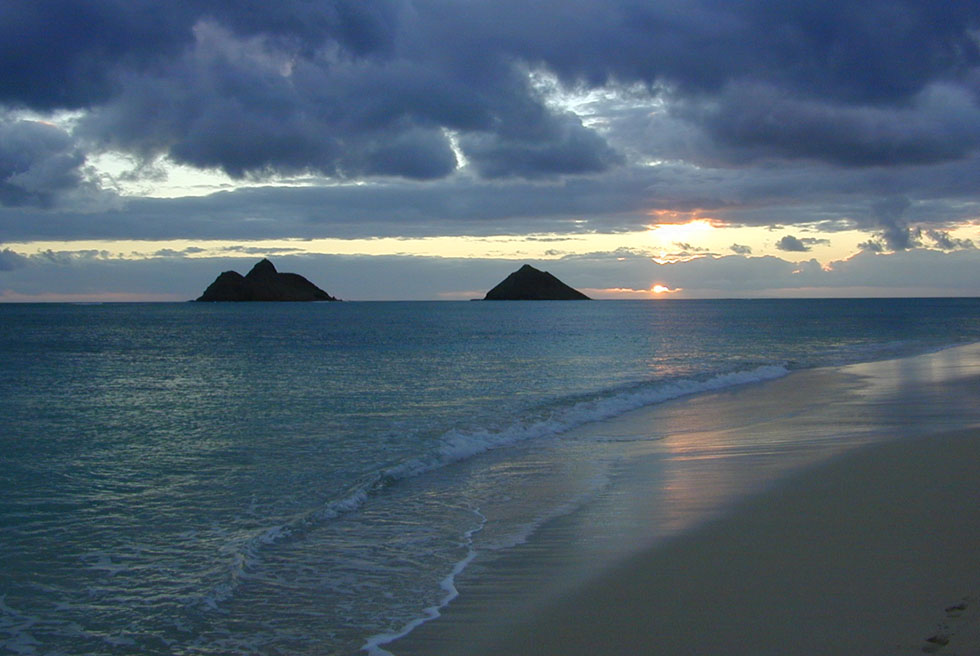
View from Lanikai Beach at dawn

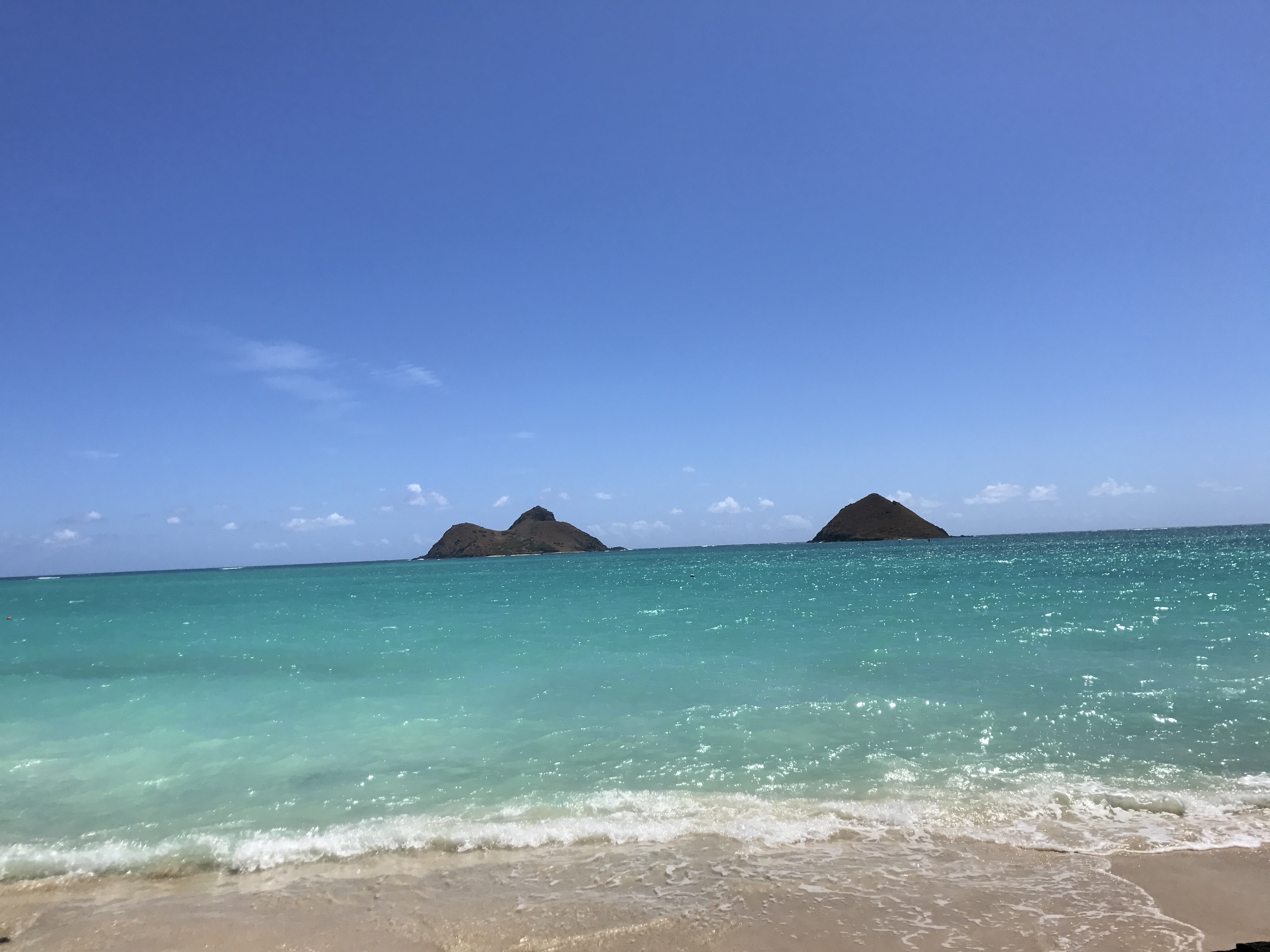
The Mokulua from the coast of Lanikai Beach
