= Maunawili, Hawaii =

Census-designated place in Hawaii, United States

Maunawili
- Census-designated place
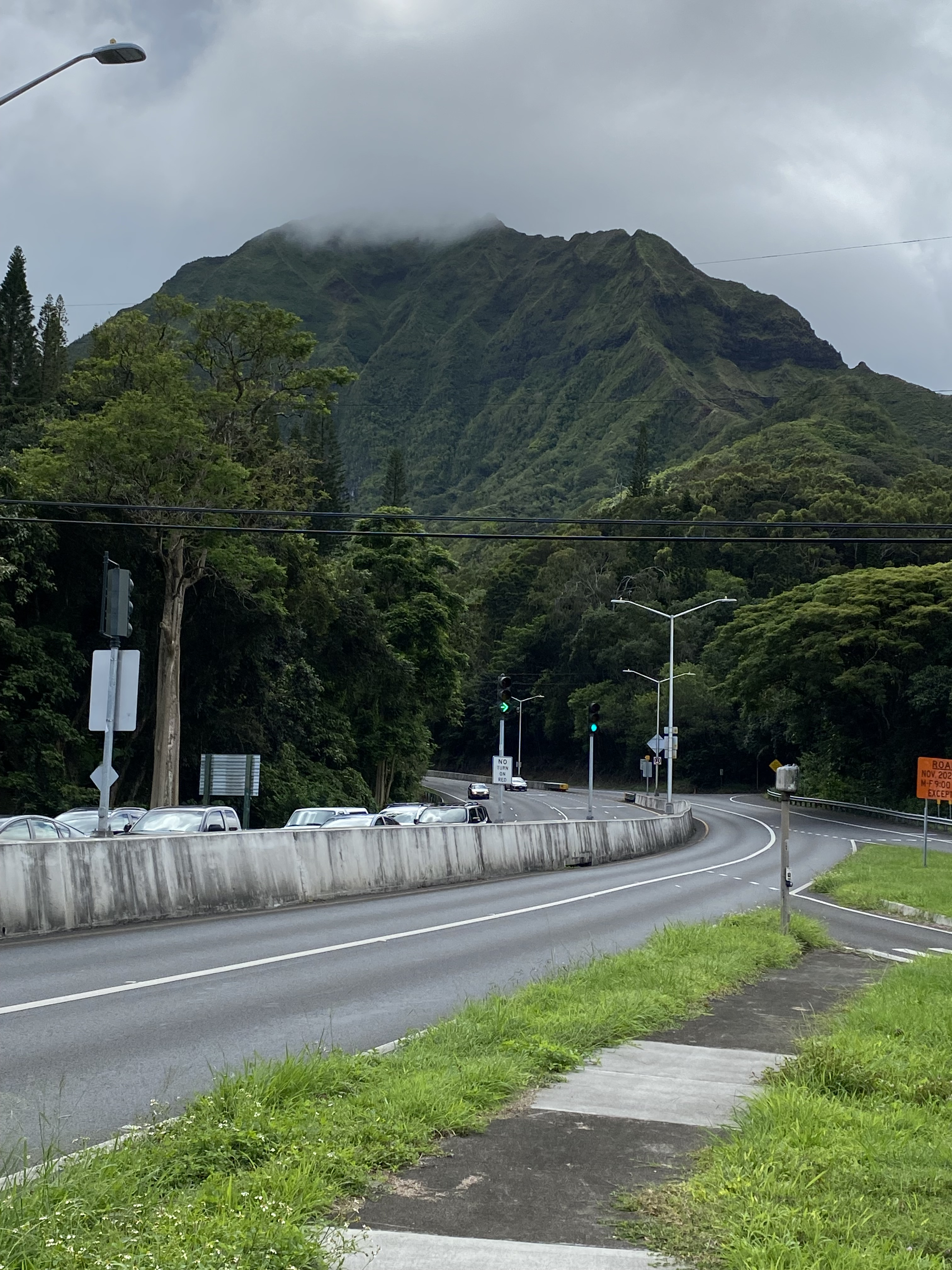
- Intersection of Route 61 and Route 83 in Maunawili

- Location in Honolulu County and the state of Hawaii
- Coordinates: 21°22′36″N 157°45′37″W
- Country: United States
- State: Hawaii

Area
  - Total: 1.83 sq mi (4.74 km^{2})
  - Land: 1.83 sq mi (4.74 km^{2})
  - Water: 0 sq mi (0.00 km^{2})
- Elevation: 69 ft (21 m)

Population (2020)
  - Total: 2,026
  - Density: 1,108.2/sq mi (427.86/km^{2})
- Time zone: UTC-10 (Hawaii-Aleutian)
- ZIP code: 96734
- Area code: 808
- FIPS code: 15-50750
- GNIS feature ID: 0362301

Maunawili (Hawaiian pronunciation: [mɐwnəˈvili]) is a residential census-designated place (CDP) in the City & County of Honolulu, Koʻolaupoko District, Island of Oʻahu, Hawaii, United States. As of the 2020 census, the CDP had a population of 2,026. Situated mauka (inland or mountain side) of Kalanianaʻole Highway between Castle Junction and Castle Hospital, Maunawili is nearly all private homes, schools, and a few churches; horse stables complete the rural setting. There are no commercial establishments. However, residents are only minutes (by car or bus) from Kailua.

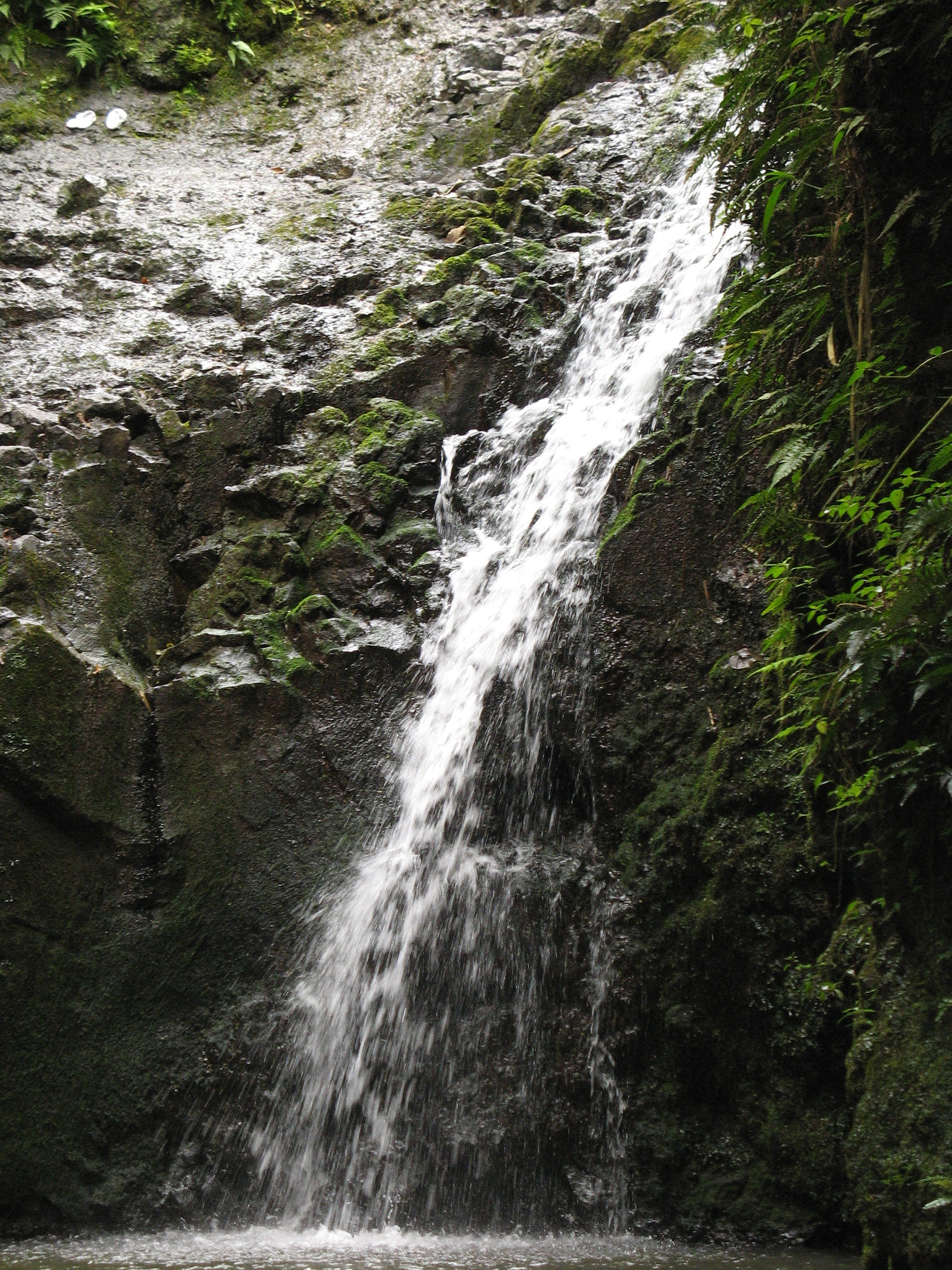
Maunawili Falls is a popular hiking destination.

Maunawili Valley extends behind the prominent windward peak known as Olomana. The residential developments extend only part way back into the valley, which is quite large and fairly wet, supporting limited agriculture (mostly banana growing) behind the housing. Water from the numerous streams is diverted by a ditch to much drier Waimānalo to support agricultural activities there.

A golf course and the Hawaiian Agriculture Research Center are located in the valley. The agriculture research station is also home to a sugar cane, coffee and cacao breeding program. An attraction of increasing popularity is the Maunawili Demonstration Trail, a state-maintained trail that traverses the breadth of upper Maunawili Valley from the Pali Highway (access at the "Horseshoe Curve") to Waimānalo. A connecting side trail (Maunawili Falls Trail) is accessible from the neighborhood in upper Maunawili.

The U.S. postal code for Maunawili is the same as for Kailua: 96734.

== Geography ==
Maunawili is located at 21°22′36″N 157°45′37″W (21.376650, -157.760166). Lying adjacent to Maunawili is the community of Kailua.

According to the United States Census Bureau, the CDP has a total area of 1.9 square miles (4.8 km^{2}), all land.

Water Resources and Tributaries of Maunawili Valley

Maunawili Valley contains a vital, highly interconnected watershed featuring more than 50 freshwater springs that feed a complex network of streams. This system plays a crucial ecological role, supplying the primary natural water source to the Kawainui Marsh ecosystem. The major mountain tributaries winding through the upper valley include:

- ʻŌmaʻo Stream: A critical mountain stream flowing through the lush, verdant forests of the inner valley

- Makawao Stream: The tributary located furthest back in the deep valley interior

- Ainoni Stream:A perennial freshwater branch feeding into the central basin

- Palapū Stream: A key stream contributing to the main valley flow before bridging to the marshlands

- Kahanaiki Stream: A distinct northerly branch flowing toward the Pali cliffs to recharge the wetlands

Together, these tributaries unite into Maunawili Stream, the largest stream system in the Kailua ahupuaʻa and the longest in the entire Koʻolaupoko district.

== Demographics ==
Historical population
Census	Pop.	Note	%±
2020	2,026		—
U.S. Decennial Census

=== 2020 census ===
As of the 2020 census, Maunawili had a population of 2,026. The median age was 52.4 years. 16.8% of residents were under the age of 18 and 30.0% of residents were 65 years of age or older. For every 100 females there were 88.1 males, and for every 100 females age 18 and over there were 85.3 males age 18 and over.

93.9% of residents lived in urban areas, while 6.1% lived in rural areas.

There were 725 households in Maunawili, of which 31.0% had children under the age of 18 living in them. Of all households, 63.7% were married-couple households, 12.1% were households with a male householder and no spouse or partner present, and 21.1% were households with a female householder and no spouse or partner present. About 15.9% of all households were made up of individuals and 10.1% had someone living alone who was 65 years of age or older.

There were 762 housing units, of which 4.9% were vacant. The homeowner vacancy rate was 1.4% and the rental vacancy rate was 9.5%.

Racial composition as of the 2020 census
Race	Number	Percent
White	684	33.8%
Black or African American	5	0.2%
American Indian and Alaska Native	3	0.1%
Asian	672	33.2%
Native Hawaiian and Other Pacific Islander	77	3.8%
Some other race	18	0.9%
Two or more races	567	28.0%
Hispanic or Latino (of any race)	102	5.0%

=== 2000 census ===
As of the 2000 census, there were 4,869 people, 1,458 households, and 1,224 families residing in the CDP. The population density was 1,399.0 inhabitants per square mile (540.2/km^{2}). There were 1,491 housing units at an average density of 428.4 per square mile (165.4/km^{2}). The racial makeup of the CDP was 36.62% White, 0.55% Black or African American, 0.08% Native American, 28.47% Asian, 8.79% Pacific Islander, 0.55% from other races, and 24.93% from two or more races. 5.79% of the population were Hispanic or Latino of any race.

There were 1,458 households, out of which 31.7% had children under the age of 18 living with them, 68.7% were married couples living together, 11.1% had a female householder with no husband present, and 16.0% were non-families. 11.1% of all households were made up of individuals, and 5.8% had someone living alone who was 65 years of age or older. The average household size was 3.10 and the average family size 3.31.

In the CDP the population was spread out, with 23.0% under the age of 18, 6.1% from 18 to 24, 27.7% from 25 to 44, 26.9% from 45 to 64, and 16.2% who were 65 years of age or older. The median age was 41 years. For every 100 females, there were 89.2 males. For every 100 females age 18 and over, there were just 83.6 males.

The median income for a household in the CDP was $82,148, and the median income for a family was $84,294. Males had a median income of $51,078 versus $36,324 for females. The per capita income for the CDP was $30,551. 2.5% of the population and 1.5% of families were below the poverty line. Out of the total population, 3.6% of those under the age of 18 and 2.3% of those 65 and older were living below the poverty line.

== Government and infrastructure ==
The Hawaii Department of Public Safety operates the Women's Community Correctional Center in what was the Maunawili CDP as of the 2000 U.S. census. The Hawaii Department of Human Services's Hawaii Youth Correctional Facility (HYCF) was located in Maunawili CDP as of 2000. As of the 2010 U.S. census these places are defined to be in the Kailua CDP.

== Education ==
Hawaii Department of Education operates public schools. Maunawilli Elementary School and Kailua High School were located in the 2000 Maunawili CDP. As of 2010 they are defined to be in the Kailua CDP.

== See also ==
- Hoʻokuaʻāina
