= Kailua, Hawaii =

Census-designated place in Hawaii, United States

Kailua
- Census-designated place
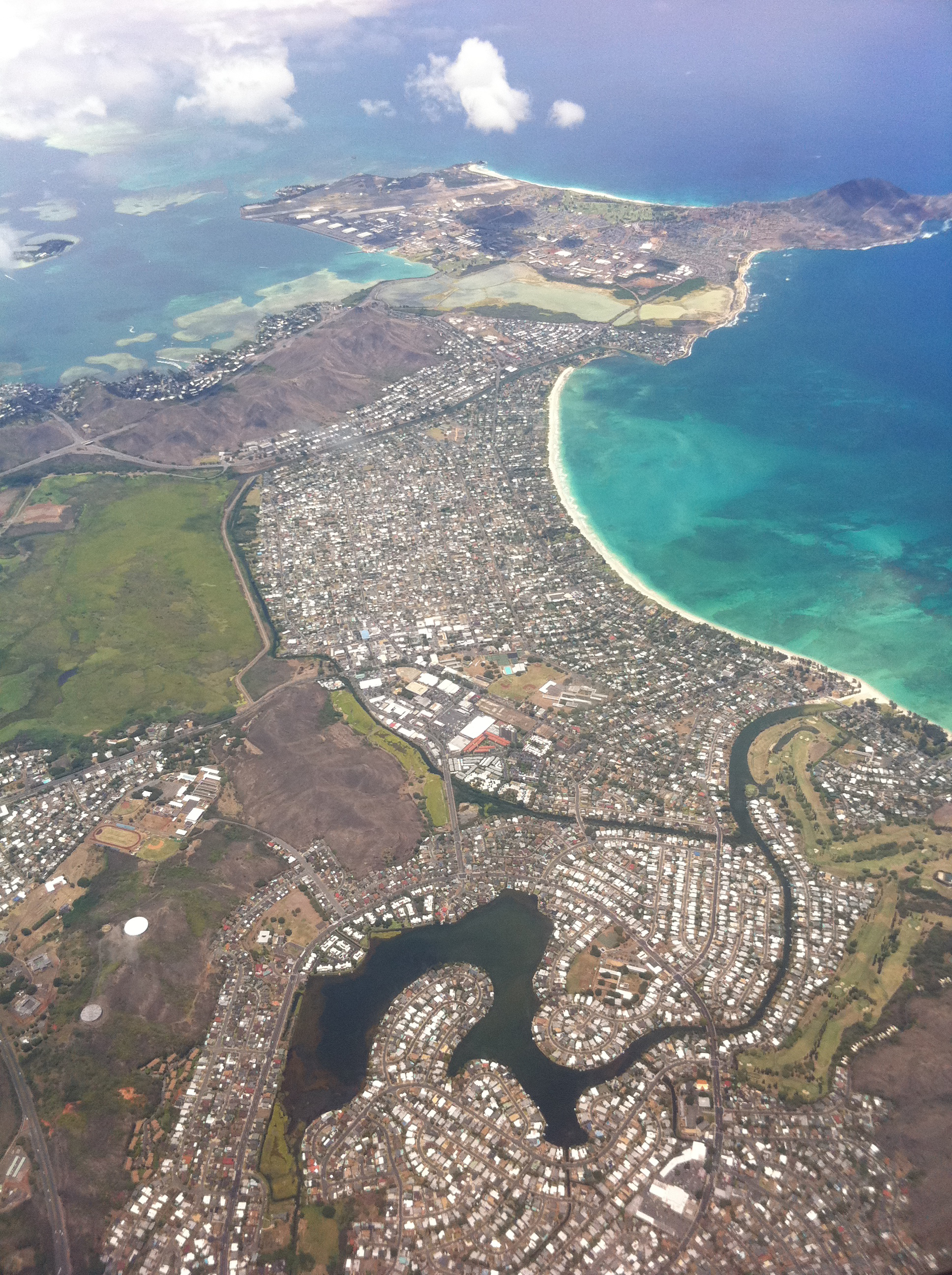
- Aerial photo of Kailua, Enchanted Lake, and Mokapu Peninsula

- Location in Honolulu County and the state of Hawaii

- Location in Hawaii
- Coordinates: 21°23′51″N 157°44′22″W
- Country: United States
- State: Hawaii
- County: Honolulu

Area
  - Total: 10.59 sq mi (27.44 km^{2})
  - Land: 7.77 sq mi (20.13 km^{2})
  - Water: 2.82 sq mi (7.31 km^{2})
- Elevation: 16 ft (5 m)

Population (2020)
  - Total: 40,514
  - Density: 5,212.8/sq mi (2,012.67/km^{2})
- Time zone: UTC−10 (Hawaii–Aleutian)
- Zip Code: 96734
- Area code: 808
- FIPS code: 15-23150
- GNIS feature ID: 359894

Kailua (English: /kaɪˈluːə/ kye-LOO-ə, Hawaiian: [kɐjˈluwə]) is a census-designated place (CDP) in Honolulu County, Hawaii, United States. It lies in the Koʻolaupoko District of the island of Oʻahu on the windward coast at Kailua Bay. It is in the judicial district and the ahupua'a named Ko'olaupoko. It is 12 miles (19 km) northeast of Honolulu – over Nu‘uanu Pali.

In the Hawaiian language Kailua means "two seas" or "two currents", a contraction of the words kai (meaning "sea" or "sea water") and ʻelua (meaning "two"); it is so named because of the two former fishponds in the district (Kawainui and Kaʻelepulu) or the two currents that run through Kailua Bay.

Kailua is primarily a residential community, with a centralized commercial district along Kailua Road. The population was 50,000 in 1992. In the 2017 census, the population had dropped to 38,000. The population was 40,514 at the 2020 census.

Places of note in Kailua include Kailua Beach Park, Kaʻōhao or Lanikai Beach, Kawainui Marsh, Maunawili Falls, and Marine Corps Base Hawaii. It was home to Barack Obama’s winter White House.

== History ==
=== Early history ===
During the reign of King Kākuhihewa and his successors, Kanekapu, Kahoowaha, Kauakahiakahoowaha, and Kualiʻi, Kailua replaced Waikiki as the residential seat of the Oʻahu Rulers (aliʻi nui of Oʻahu). Many ancient temple ruins, such as those at Ulupo Heiau State Historic Site, are in the area. After the Oʻahu army's defeat by King Kamehameha the Great at the Battle of Nuʻuanu in 1795, the political capital and residential seat of the aliʻi nui of Oʻahu was relocated from Kailua to Honolulu.

== Beach ==
Kailua Beach is crescent-shaped, about 2.5 miles (4.0 km) long, and ranging between 50 and 150 feet (15 and 46 m) wide. The ocean bottom fronting the beach slopes gently to overhead depths without any coral heads. Light to medium waves support surfing and bodysurfing. The steady trade winds make Kailua Beach a top windsurfing and kitesurfing destination. Robby Naish, first World Champion of windsurfing and Professional Windsurfers Association Hall of Fame inductee, grew up in Kailua.

Sea kayaking and stand-up paddleboarding to the protected seabird sanctuaries, Flat Island and Nā Mokulua, popularly known as "the Mokes", have become increasingly popular water activities at the beach.

== Geography ==
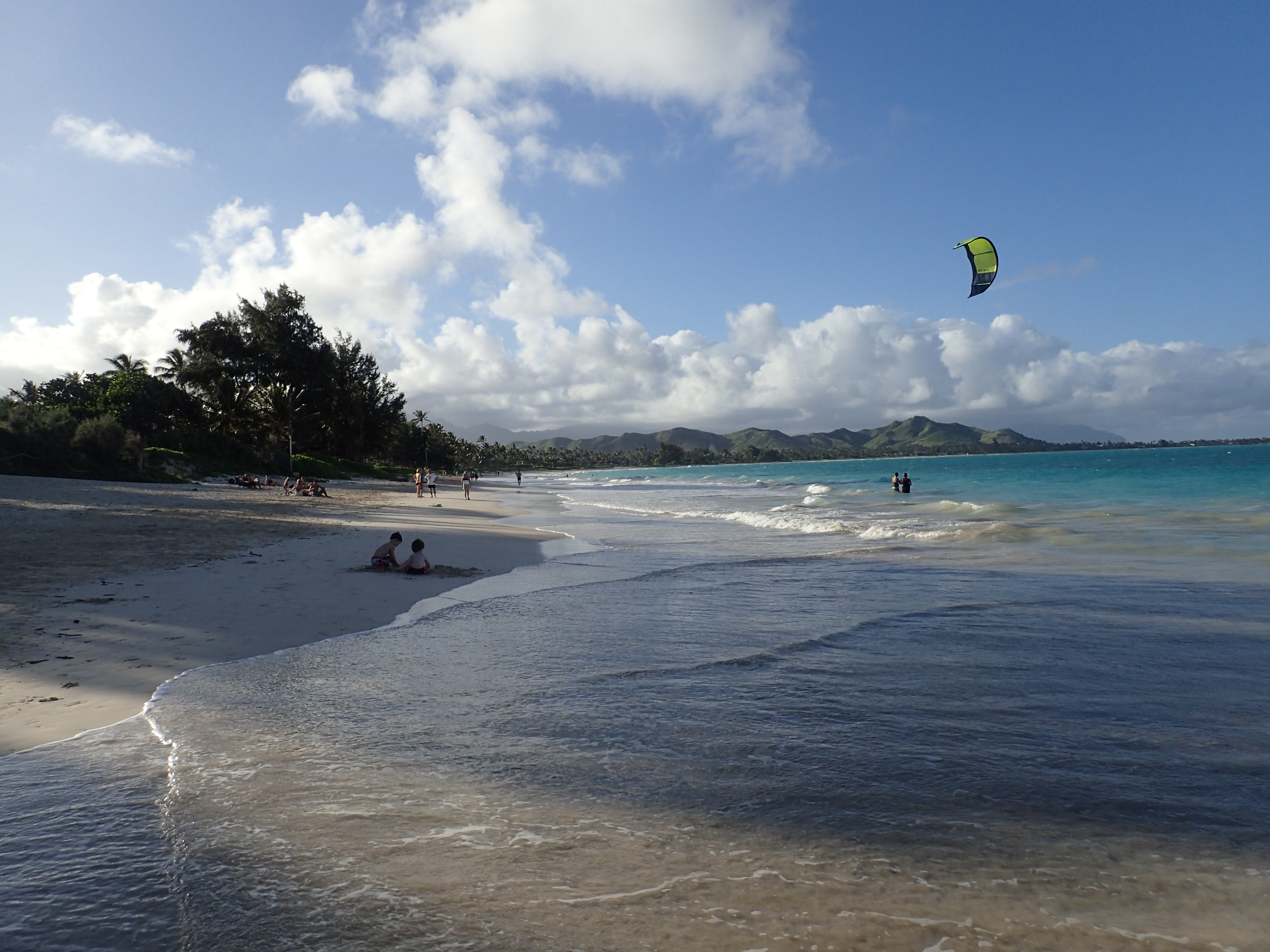
Kailua Bay

Kailua is located at 21°23′51″N 157°44′22″W (21.397370, −157.739515). Nearby towns include Kāneʻohe, Maunawili, and Waimānalo.

According to the United States Census Bureau, the CDP has an area of 10.6 square miles (27.4 km^{2}), of which 7.8 square miles (20.1 km^{2}) is land and 2.8 square miles (7.3 km^{2}) (26.62%) is water. A significant portion of the water area is Kawainui Marsh, the largest wetland in the Hawaiian Islands and a Ramsar Convention site.

=== Kaʻōhao/Lanikai ===
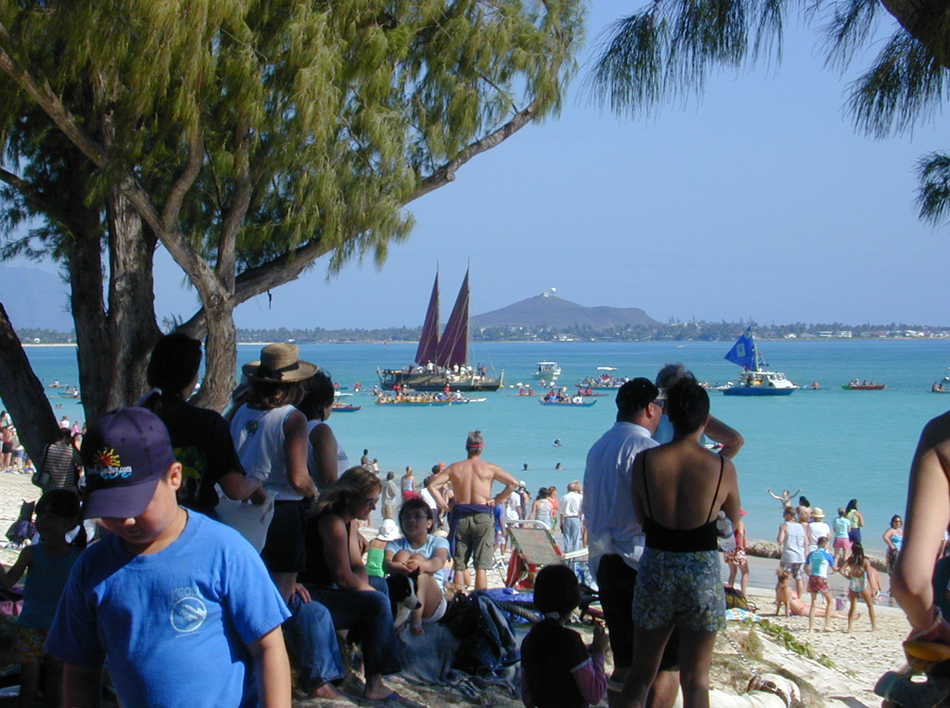
The Hawaiian voyaging canoe, Hokuleʻa, arrives off Kailua Beach

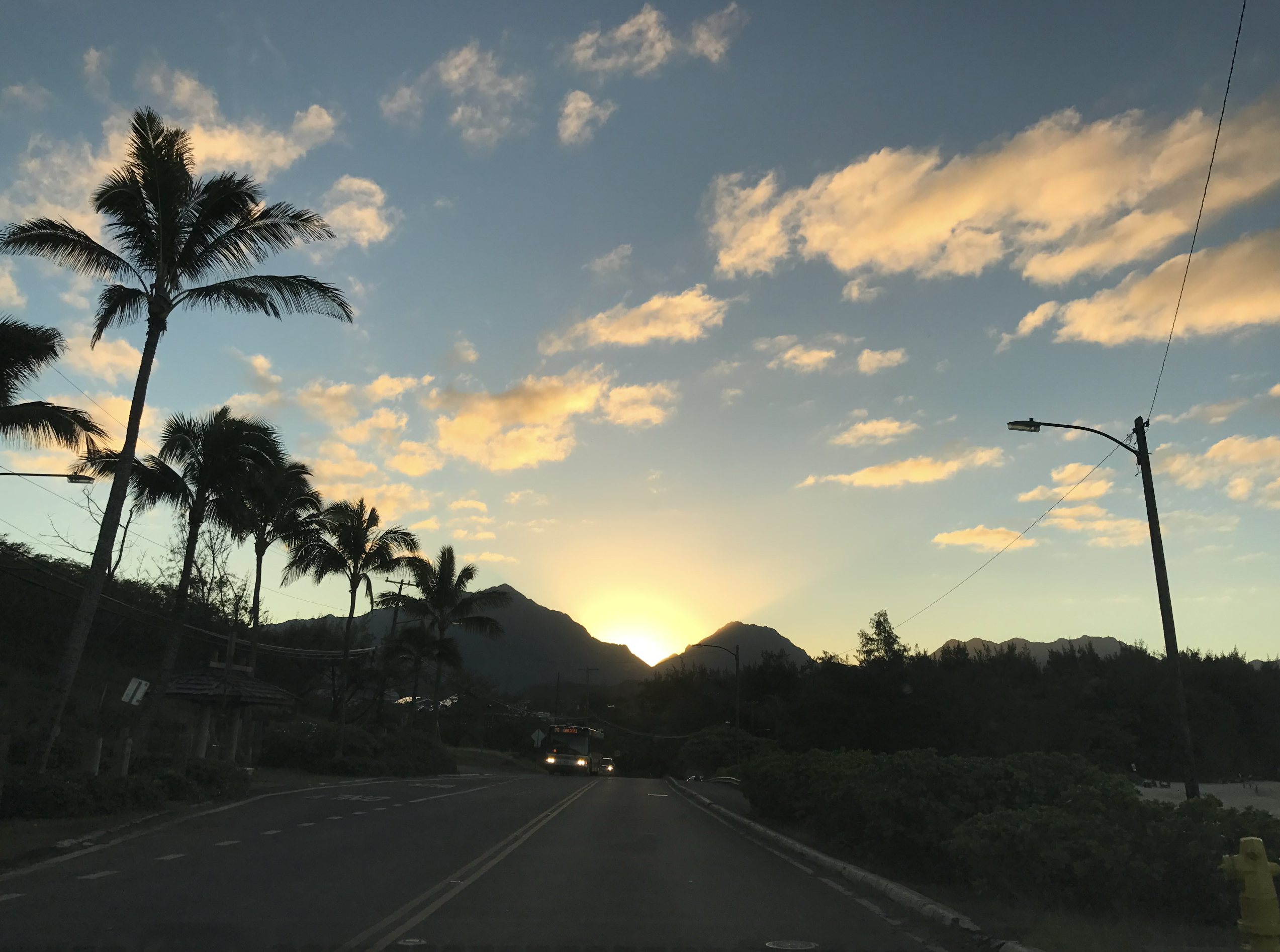
Kailua Bay Sunset

Kaʻōhao (pronounced [kəʔˈoːhao]) is the earliest known Hawaiian name for the place known as "Lanikai." Kaʻōhao means "the tying" and is derived from an old story in which "two women were tied together here with a loincloth after being beaten in a kōnane game". Kaʻōhao was commercially developed in the 1920s and renamed "Lanikai." It is now an unincorporated community in Kailua on the windward coast at Kailua Bay. Lanikai Beach was rated one of the world's top ten beaches by Sherman's Travel Magazine. The area is known for its white, powder-like sandy beach and its hiking trail along the Kaʻiwa Ridge to the World War II military bunkers commonly known as the "Lanikai Pillboxes". Because of its small community and easy access to its famous beach, Lanikai has one of Hawaii's most expensive real estate markets. It is served by Kailua's zip code, 96734.

== Climate ==
Kailua has a tropical savanna climate.

Climate data for Kailua, 1985-2013
Month	Jan	Feb	Mar	Apr	May	Jun	Jul	Aug	Sep	Oct	Nov	Dec	Year
Mean daily maximum °F (°C)	80.0 (26.7)	79.5 (26.4)	80.1 (26.7)	80.8 (27.1)	83.3 (28.5)	84.5 (29.2)	85.0 (29.4)	85.9 (29.9)	85.9 (29.9)	84.9 (29.4)	82.3 (27.9)	80.2 (26.8)	82.7 (28.2)
Mean daily minimum °F (°C)	67.7 (19.8)	67.7 (19.8)	68.3 (20.2)	69.5 (20.8)	71.3 (21.8)	73.0 (22.8)	73.9 (23.3)	74.5 (23.6)	74.1 (23.4)	73.3 (22.9)	71.6 (22.0)	69.3 (20.7)	71.2 (21.8)
Average rainfall inches (mm)	5.13 (130)	4.93 (125)	6.97 (177)	3.28 (83)	3.34 (85)	2.71 (69)	2.71 (69)	2.87 (73)	3.56 (90)	5.07 (129)	7.01 (178)	6.24 (158)	53.82 (1,366)
Source: WRCC

== Demographics ==
Historical population
Census	Pop.	Note	%±
2020	40,514		—
U.S. Decennial Census

Historically, Kailua was an ahupuaʻa, or area of land ruled by chief or king and managed by the members of the ʻaliʻi.

As of the census of 2020, there were an estimated 40,514 people and 12,387 households with an average of 3.04 people per household in Kailua. The population density was 5,212.8 inhabitants per square mile (2,012.7 inhabitants/km^{2}), which was less dense than that of Honolulu (5842.0 per square mile or 2255.6/km^{2}). There were 4,322 housing units in Kailua at an average density of 121.7 per square mile (47.0/km^{2}).

The racial makeup of Kailua was 44.8% White, 0.9% Black or African American, 0.2% Native American, 19.3% Asian, 4.4% Pacific Islander, 1.4% from other races, and 29.0% from two or more races. The Kailua population had a greater percentage of White residents and a lower percentage of Asian residents than the state in aggregate (25.3% and 38.6% respectively). 8.6% of the Kailua population were Hispanic or Latino of any race.

12.7% of Kailua residents reported having a language other than English spoken at home, less than the state average of 26.1%. The age of the population in Kailua was varied, with 5.8% of inhabitants being under the age of 5, 21.6% being under the age of 18, and 19.3% being above the age of 65. For every 100 females, there were 97.4 males.

The median annual household income in Kailua was $122,706, and the per capita annual income was $51,260. 5.0% of the population in Kailua was estimated to be below the poverty line, which was below the state average of 11.2%. Approximately 35.0% of businesses in Kailua were minority-owned, a rate nearly double that of the national average of 18.7%.

== Government and infrastructure ==
The Honolulu Police Department operates the Kailua Substation in Kailua. The United States Postal Service operates the Kailua Post Office.

The Hawaii Department of Public Safety operates the Women's Community Correctional Center; it was defined in the Maunawili CDP as of the 2000 U.S. census, but was redefined as being in the Kailua CDP as of the 2010 U.S. census. NBC News stated that the prison was in Kailua.

The Hawaii Department of Human Services operates the Hawaii Youth Correctional Facility (HYCF), which was defined as Maunawili by the Census Bureau in 2000, and as Kailua by the same organization in 2010. The United States Department of Justice also stated the facility was in Kailua.

== Tourism ==
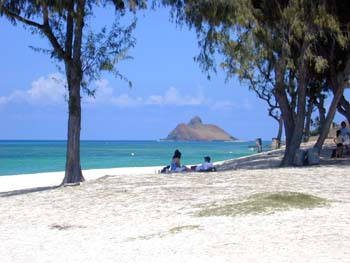
View across Kailua Beach to the offshore islet known as Moku nui, one of the Nā Mokulua islands off Lanikai

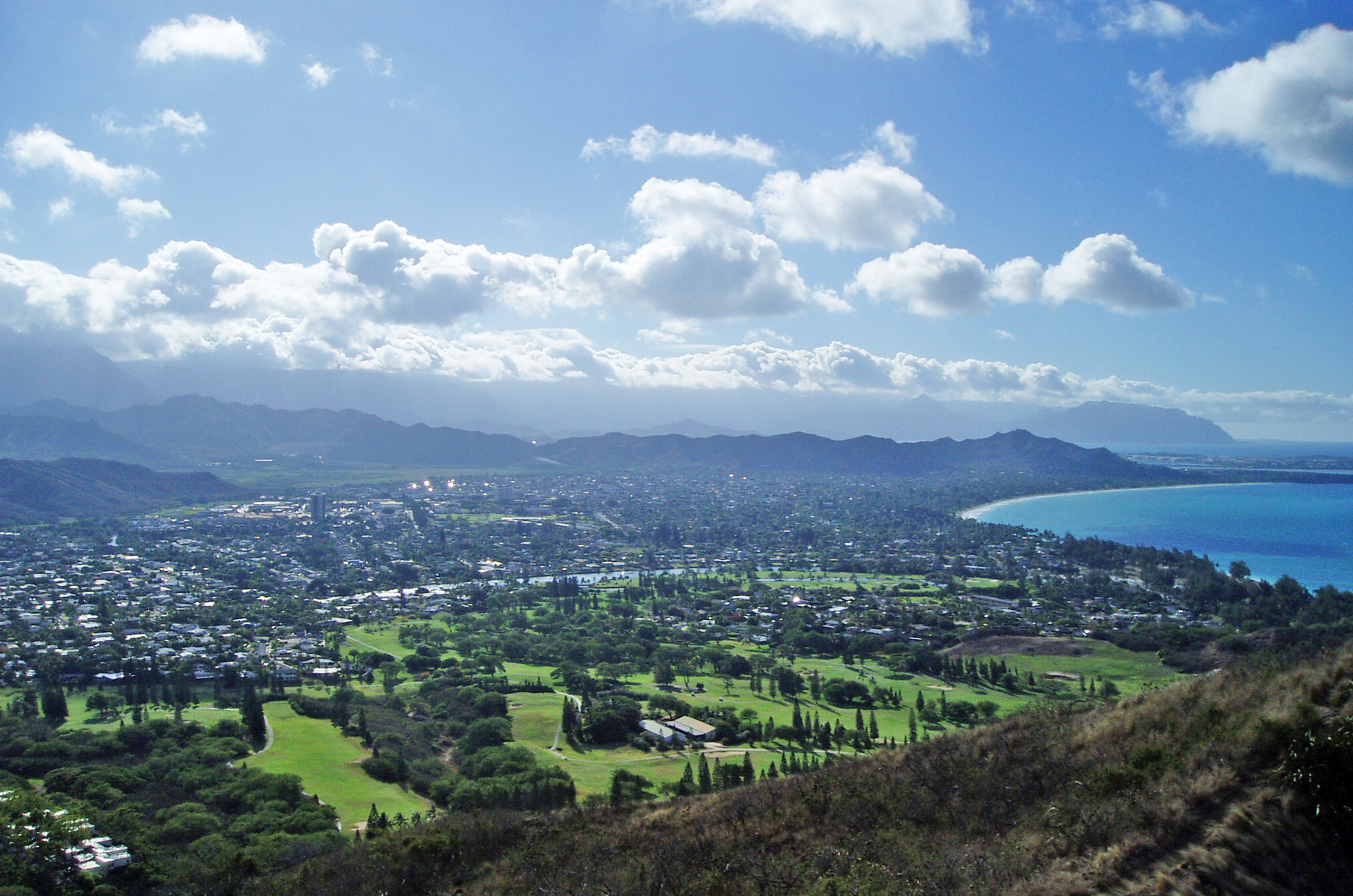
View of Kailua from the Kaiwa Ridge Trail (Keolu Hills)

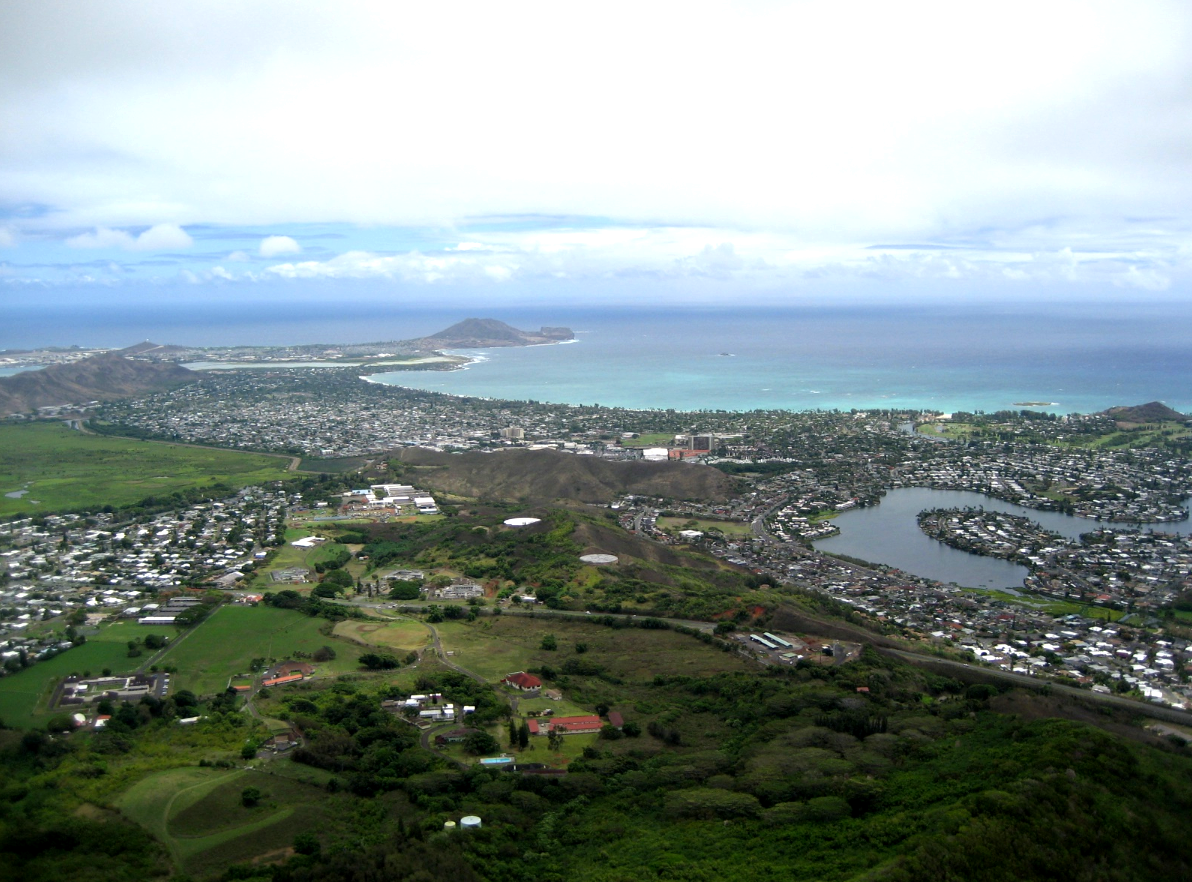
View of Kailua Town from Ahiki, the third peak of Olomana

Historically, most tourism on the island of O'ahu has centered around Waikiki and other tourism-designated areas. But tourism has also been a major economic force in Kailua, and tourism-related jobs have historically made up roughly one-third of total employment in Hawaii. The Obama family vacations, as well as coverage from various social media and travel sites, sparked new interest in Kailua as a tourist destination and led to an influx of tourists to Kailua. This influx led to pushback from some Kailua residents, prompting proposals of legislation to limit tourist activity there.

=== Winter White House ===
Barack Obama vacationed in Kailua between 2008 and 2012. In 2010, 2011, and 2012, the Obama family stayed in the rented, ocean-front house Plantation Estate in the Paradise Point Estates. The house was built by developer Harold Kainalu Long Castle, who also lived there. Obama also took a vacation break in August 2008 at a different house in Kailua, Oahu Lani, during the 2008 United States presidential election.

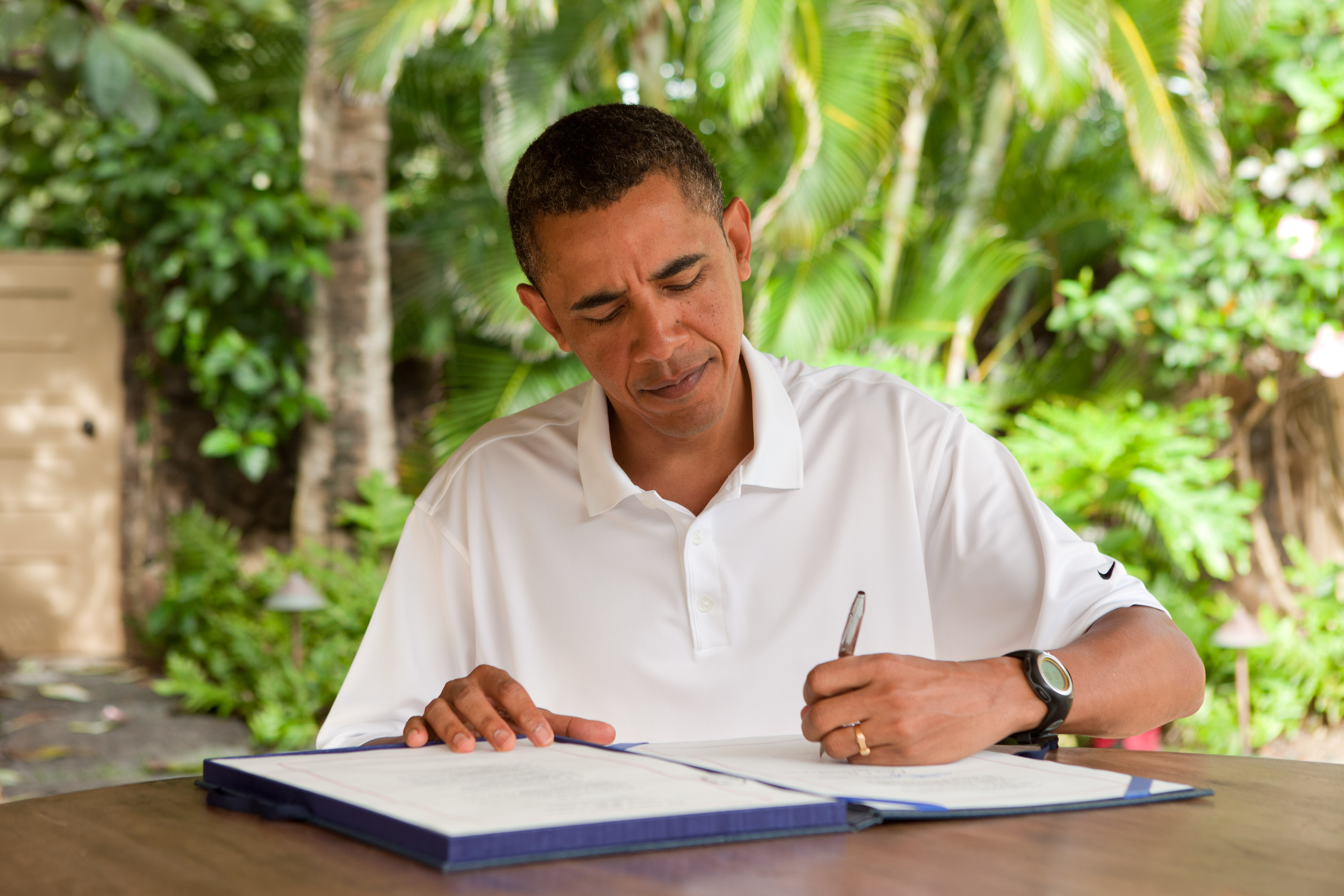
Obama signing the James Zadroga 9/11 Health and Compensation Act on January 2, 2011.

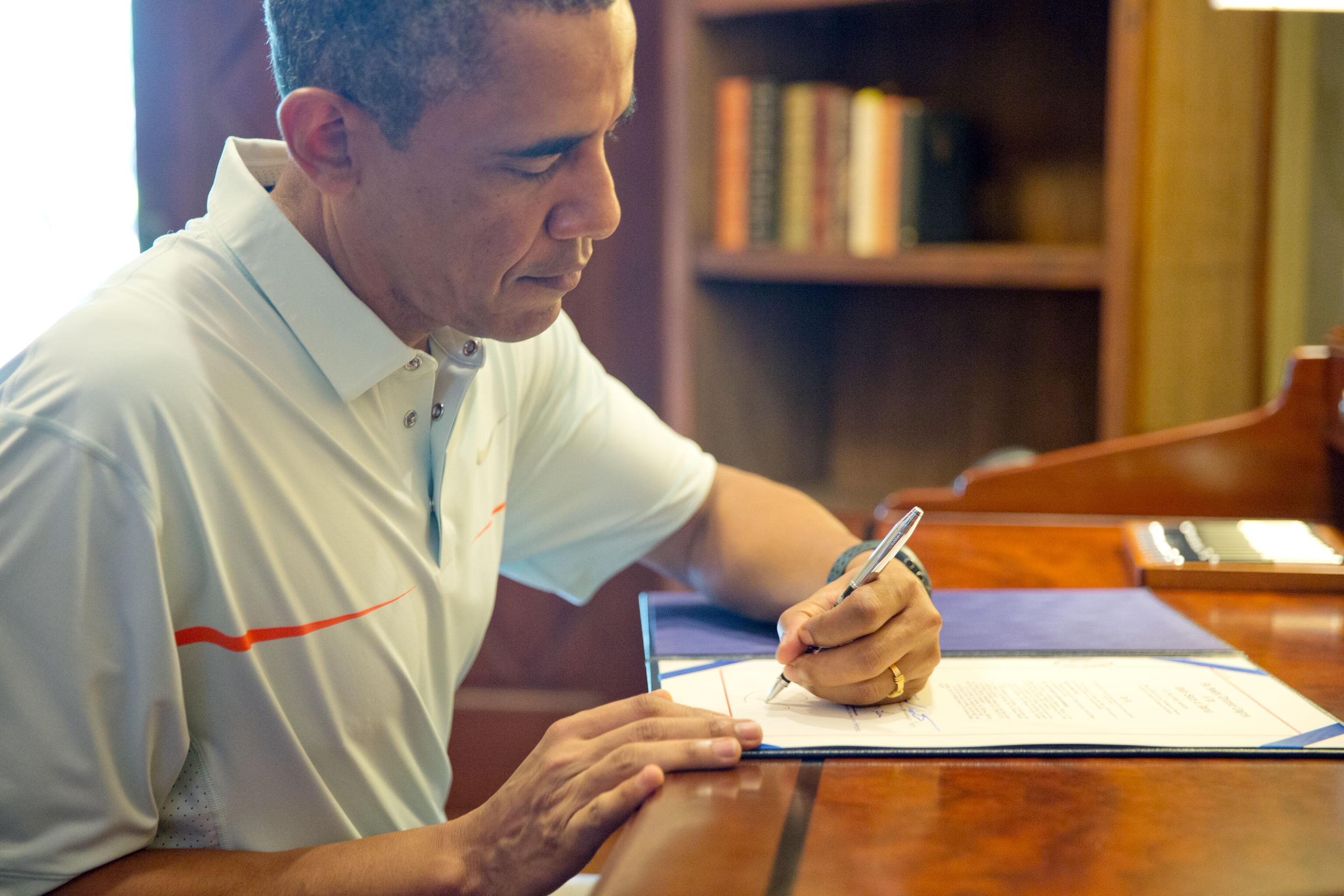
President Obama signing the Bipartisan Budget Act of 2013 on December 26, 2013

=== Controversy ===
Although tourism is the primary driver of Kailua's economy, it remains a contentious issue among the town's residents. On several occasions, residents have successfully introduced legislation to discourage tourism in the town. One such example is Bill 41, introduced to the Honolulu City Council in October 2021. In 2022, Honolulu County Mayor Rick Blangiardi signed Bill 41 into law at a press conference held on Kailua beach. The bill places additional limits and restrictions on short-term rental units. These include requiring a permit to rent living space in a residential area for less than 90 days, as well as requiring hosting platforms (such as Airbnb) to report all listings in Honolulu County (which includes Kailua town) to the county government. Proponents of Bill 41 expect its passage to dramatically reduce the volume of tourists in Kailua.

== Education ==
=== Public schools ===
The Hawai'i Department of Education operates the public schools.

Elementary schools in the CDP include Aikahi, Enchanted Lake, Kaʻelepulu, Kailua, Kainalu, Keolu, and Maunawili. Kailua Intermediate School, Kalaheo High School, and Kailua High School are also in the CDP. Kailua High and Maunawili Elementary were defined as being in the Maunawili CDP as of the 2000 Census, but in Kailua CDP as of the 2010 Census.

Kaʻōhao Public Charter School was previously known as Lanikai Elementary Public Charter School and opened in 1964. It became a charter school in 1996, and it received its current name in 2017.

Mokapu Elementary School is on the nearby Marine Corps Base Hawaii (MCBH), outside of the CDP but with a Kailua address.

=== Area private schools ===
Catholic schools of the Roman Catholic Diocese of Honolulu:

- St. Anthony School
- St. John Vianney School

Others:

- Trinity Christian School
- Redemption Academy
- Windward Adventist School
- Le Jardin Academy (Kailua address but not in the CDP)
- Huakailani School for Girls (K-8) (Kaneohe CDP)

== Films ==
Movies and TV shows filmed in Kailua include:

1. Hawaii Five-O (1968): "King of the Hill" – TV episode
2. Waikiki (1980) (TV)
3. Mädchengeschichten (1998): Shea – "Surfer girl" – TV episode
4. Lost (2004–10) – TV episodes
5. Magnum, P.I. (1980–88) – TV episodes
6. Hawaii Five-0 (2010)- TV episodes

== Community ==
Kailua hosts various events throughout the year, from block parties to fireworks.

== Notable people ==
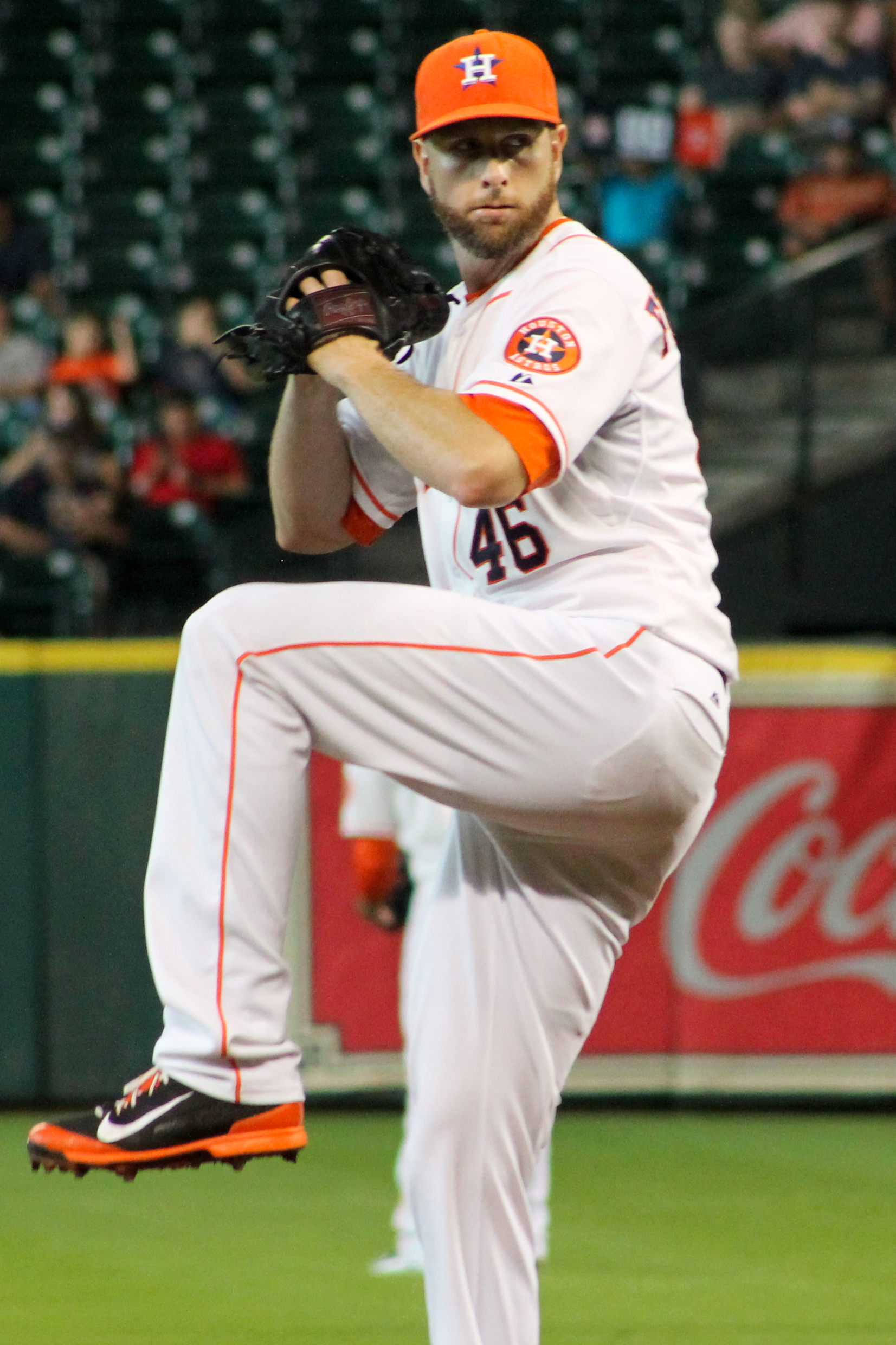
Scott Feldman

- Mike Akiu, American football player
- Wally Amos, founder of the "Famous Amos" cookie brand
- Alpha L. Bowser, Lieutenant General, U.S. Marine Corps, decorated for actions during the battles of Iwo Jima and Chosin Reservoir
- Lynne Boyer, former World Champion professional surfer
- Pete Cabrinha (windsurfing, kitesurfing, surfing), professional windsurfer, Peahi tow-in pioneer
- Joey Cantillo, Major League Baseball pitcher
- Emily Chang, Bloomberg news anchor
- Henry Ian Cusick, Peruvian-British actor
- Kaʻimi Fairbairn, professional football player
- Scott Feldman, Major League Baseball pitcher
- Sid Fernandez, former Major League Baseball pitcher
- Russ Francis, former professional football player
- Derek Ho (surfing), former World Champion professional surfer, Kailua High Alumni
- Michael Ho, professional surfer, Kailua High Alumni
- David Hughes, former professional American football player
- Kila Ka'aihue, Major League Baseball player
- Les Keiter, sportscaster
- Allan J. Kellogg, Medal of Honor recipient
- Buzzy Kerbox, professional surfer, windsurfer, Ralph Lauren model
- Evangeline Lilly, Canadian actress
- Denise Michele, model
- Chris Naeole, professional football player
- Robby Naish (windsurfing, kitesurfing), former World Champion professional windsurfer
- B. J. Penn, former Ultimate Fighting Championship welterweight and lightweight champion and world Brazilian jiu-jitsu Champion
- Albert Pyun, film director
- Jonah Ray, comedian and actor
- Samson Satele, professional football player
- Jesse Smith, water polo player
- Bobby Webster, NBA General Manager of Toronto Raptors
