= Kaʻelepulu Pond =

Pond and wetland in Kailua, Hawaii

- Enchanted Lake
- Location on Oahu
- Interactive map of Kaʻelepulu Pond
- Location: Kailua, Hawaii
- Coordinates: 21°22′56″N 157°44′16″W
- Type: Estuary

Kaʻelepulu Pond, also known as Enchanted Lake, is an estuary in Kailua, Hawaii. The Hawaiian name Kaʻelepulu literally means "moist blackness". Historically a 200-to-400-acre (81 to 162 hectare) Hawaiian fish pond, and later a fishery made up of 190 acres (77 hectares) of water and 90 acres (36 hectares) of marsh, Kaʻelepulu was partially filled in and built on beginning in 1959. Today the pond covers about 95 acres (38 hectares) in total, including wetland and some small islands, and has been subject to fish kills and algal blooms as a result of pollution from surface runoff; the Enchanted Lake Residents Association advises residents not to eat anything taken from it.

== History ==
Kaʻelepulu Pond was historically a 200-to-400-acre (81 to 162 hectare) Hawaiian fish pond. It belonged to Princess Ruth Keʻelikōlani in the 1880s, and she leased surrounding land to rice farmers. The Waimanalo Sugar Company pumped 2,000,000 US gallons (7,600 m^{3}) of water from Kaʻelepulu Pond to Waimānalo each day for irrigation of sugarcane until the company shut down in 1947.

In December 1952, ducks began getting sick and dying at Kaʻelepulu Pond. The cause was determined to be an outbreak of botulism, which was an unusual phenomenon in Hawaii at the time. An ongoing bird banding effort at the site was converted into a duck rescue program, and approximately 357 ducks were transported to the Honolulu Zoo from December 1952 through January 1953; during that same period, 636 ducks were estimated to have died at the pond.

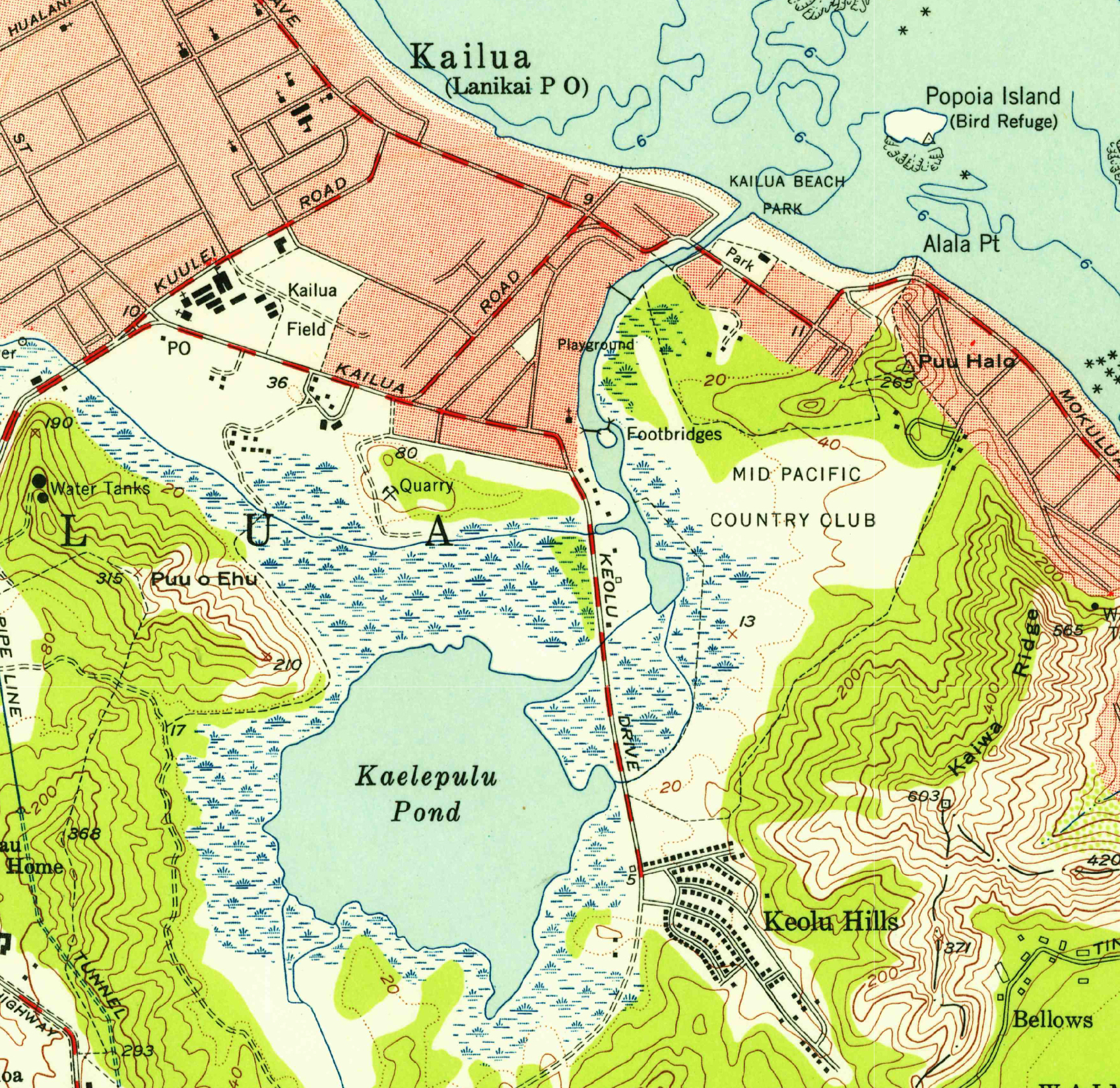
Kaʻelepulu Pond and surrounding wetland in a 1952 USGS map, before the pond was filled in

In the 1950s the area was owned by the Bishop Trust, which began developing much of the land in a joint venture with Joseph Pao. Beginning in 1959 and continuing through the mid-1960s, soil from other nearby construction projects run by Pao was used to fill in parts of the pond in order to create space for Enchanted Lake Estates, a housing subdivision.

In December 1979, the Enchanted Lake Association, Bishop Estate, and two developers sued the United States and multiple United States Army Corps of Engineers officials after the Corps had ruled in July that Kaʻelepulu was a navigable water of the United States, subject to the tide and therefore open to the public. The lawsuit said that the pond had been "developed into a recreational lake for the private use of owners of surrounding homes". In January 1980, Henry J. Hatch (then the head of the Pacific Ocean Division of the Corps) decided not to assert the right of public access after the Supreme Court of the United States ruled that Kuapa Pond in Hawaii Kai was not open for public use despite also being navigable.

In 1990, a developer proposed adding 20,000 cubic yards (15,000 m^{3}) of fill to an area of the pond in order to create stable land for more housing. A group of hundreds of nearby residents opposed the proposal, including Sandy Pao, a relative of Joseph Pao who led the initial addition of fill to the pond. Also in the 1990s, the Army Corps of Engineers issued a permit for a wetland bird habitat in the pond as mitigation after a previous owner of the habitat property used it for illegal dumping.

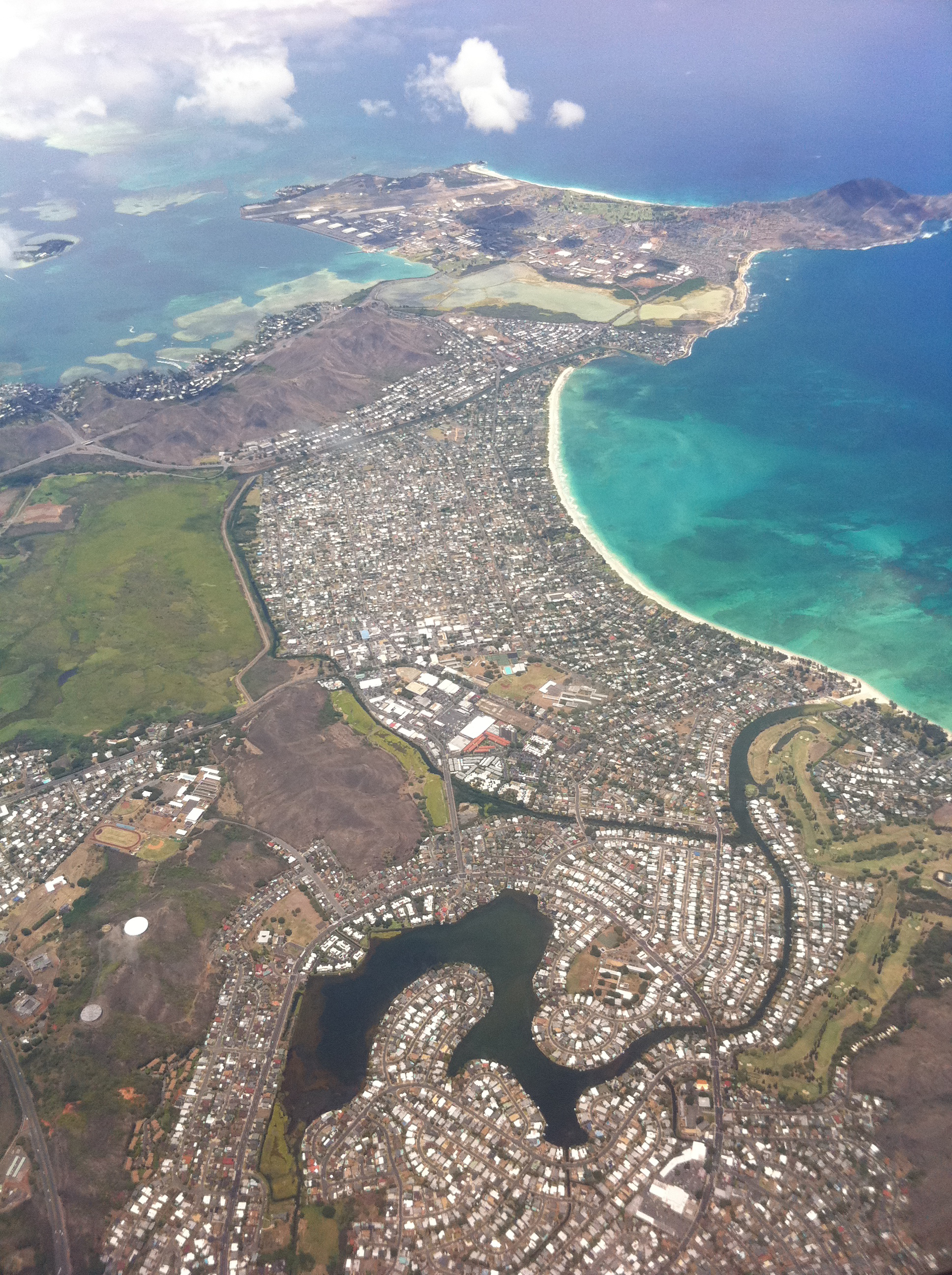
Aerial view of Kailua in 2010, with Kaʻelepulu Pond at bottom

In 2003, the manager of the bird habitat cleared it of overgrown vegetation as well as domestic geese and ducks after nearby residents complained about an unpleasant odor.

== In Hawaiian culture ==
The Hawaiian moʻolelo and epic Mākālei ka lāʻau piʻi ona a ka iʻa o Moaʻulanuiākea i Kaulana (literally "the famous fish-attracting branch of Moaʻulanuiākea", shortened as Mākālei) describes the use of both Kaʻelepulu and Kawainui Marsh as fish ponds.

== Works cited ==
- Bourke, Robert E. (April 26, 2012). "Kaelepulu Pond: Community Efforts to Preserve an Urban Tropical Estuary". World Environmental and Water Resources Congress 2008. pp. 1–10. doi:10.1061/40976(316)444. ISBN 9780784409763.
- Kailua: In the Wisps of the Malanai Breeze. Kailua, Hawaii: Kailua Historical Society. 2009. ISBN 9781883528393. OCLC 551223444.
