= History of Grant County, Kansas =

Grant County is a county located in southwest Kansas, in the Central United States. Its county seat and only city is Ulysses.

== Introduction ==
Grant County is located in the High Plains region in the southwestern corner of Kansas, with its western edge being 27 miles from the Colorado state line, and its southern edge 26 miles from the Oklahoma border, as these perimeters are currently delineated. It lies between the 37th and 38th parallels, and the 101st and 102nd meridians. The elevation at Ulysses Kansas, the county seat in the center of the county, is 3,050 feet above sea level.

The county is 24 miles square with a large portion of flat terrain, excluding the bluffs and breaks on the Cimarron River, the rolling country bordering the North Fork of the Cimarron River in the center of the county, and along Bear Creek in the northwestern corner. The streams flow eastward and carry minimal water under normal conditions. However, rains falling west of the area tend to create flooding since some streams drop as much as eight feet per mile. The overall width of the Cimarron River basin valley erosion in southern Grant County indicates that the river was once significantly larger.

In the prehistory and early history of what became Grant County, the focal points were the ancient spring on the Cimarron, now known as Wagon Bed Spring, and the trading path beside it which eventually came to be called the Santa Fe Trail.

=== Prehistoric Era ===
Vast deposits of natural gas suggest that millions of years ago this was a semi-tropical region with plentiful vegetation. Further evidence of prior life includes mastodon remains, petrified vegetation, and imprints left by marine life. Prior to its state as a semi-tropical region, it was an inland ocean.

In 1922, railroad workers uncovered the skeleton of a young woman standing upright on the Santa Fe Trail. The remains were later transferred to the Ulysses Kansas cemetery.

Pottery found in the southeast corner of the county was dated by the Smithsonian Institution at 200-800 A.D., and some pieces found nearby are believed to be older than that.

=== Native American Era ===
Prior to European arrival, buffalo were common within the prairies. Consequently, the indigenous people in the area were able to travel with the extensive buffalo population, as evidenced by tools found in the ground.

=== Spanish Era ===
About 60 years before the English ventured onto the eastern shores of the North American continent, Spanish explorers entered the area and began to document its history.

Members of the Plains Apache tribe occupied the area when Europeans first arrived. Among the earliest to arrive was Spanish explorer Francisco Vásquez de Coronado, who returned to Mexico with accounts of civilization in Quivira in 1541. The journal of his expedition states that his company returned to New Spain (Mexico) "along a shorter route known to the natives". The expedition may have been led from the Arkansas River south through the old Bear Creek pass in the sandhills to what was later known as the "Cimarron Cutoff of the Santa Fe Trail", and it is likely that they watered at the Springs on the Cimarron.

This area shares history with New Mexico due to the presence of Spanish explorers. The first permanent colony in New Mexico was founded in 1598 at San Juan by Juan de Onate. In 1610, Governor Pedro de Peralta established the capitol at Santa Fe. In the 300 years between Coronado and Santa Fe Trail days, there were 10 recorded expeditions east from New Mexico into this region, and nearly every written account mentions another, unauthorized foray onto the plains.

Similarly to Vázquez de Coronado, other Spanish explorers came in search of gold and treasure. Some arrived under orders to search for French traders occupying territory claimed by Spain. Additionally, in 1706, Captain Juan Ulibarri was sent to reclaim and return Christianized Picuris Pueblo natives who had run away from Spanish domination to what is known as El Cuartelejo in Scott County, Kansas. Ulibarri later received a report of French occupation near the “Chinali” stream, but did not seek them further due to the lateness of the season. Today, copies of Ulibarri's journal detail his views of eastern Colorado and western Kansas in 1706.

The return of the runaway Picuris to the fold was essential. The Spanish feared that other native peoples would attempt similar escapes, leading to the rebels being escorted back to New Mexico "for the good of their eternal souls". Incidentally, Captain Ulibarri's journal describes the plains region as "the place where even the Apaches lose themselves".

Another reason for coming east from Pecos was to capture the natives and return with them as slaves, partially in an effort to proselytize them. This practice became common despite denunciation from the Spanish government.

Members of these expeditions left behind evidence of their passing. The Spanish exhibit at the Kansas State Historical Society in Topeka, Kansas, until recently featured only three items of Spanish origin, all from southwest Kansas:

- the Gallego sword from Finney County
- the ring bit found near Plains, Kansas
- another Toledo-made sword found in Grant County, Kansas

The sword was found in 1938 by Ray Kepley in the southwest part of the county, on a hill above the North Fork (of the Cimarron River). Two similar swords have been reported as found along the North Fork, but they cannot be traced now.

A French religious medallion dating about 1750 was reportedly found near Wagon Bed Spring, with its locator being persuaded to place it in the state Society's museum. Accession records show that the ring arrived, but was never recovered afterwards.

During this "empty" period, the indigenous people of the plains acquired horses, significantly altering their cultures. With this change to both travel and warfare, the Comanche, Kiowa, Cheyenne, Arapaho, and Pawnee were able to push southward against the less mobile Plains Apaches.

Over 20 years before Atchison, Topeka, and Lawrence were founded, a busy trail ran through Grant County, carrying eastern goods to Santa Fe and returning with silver and gold.

== Phases of Occupation ==
Between 1541 and 1854, ownership of the territory switched at least nine times between five different nations. In addition, the region was under five separate territorial governments of the United States before becoming a state in 1861.

Grant County and its sister counties were first claimed by Spain following Coronado's expedition. The Arkansas river was the northern boundary of Spanish territory, and the 100th meridian (where Dodge City, Kansas now is located) was the eastern boundary in this part of the plains. However, Spanish colonists extended their borders beyond their capacity to defend, while Spain experienced war and internal struggles. The second claim was made by the French explorer La Salle in 1684 as part of the Louisiana Territory, encompassing all of Kansas except the extreme southwest corner.

Following the French and Indian War, the region was again claimed by Spain. In 1821, Mexico gained independence from Spain, consequently transferring territory claimed by New Spain to Mexico.

After Texas became an independent republic in 1836, incited by American settlement in the area, the region was annexed by the United States in 1845. The admission of Texas followed debates concerning the spread of slavery and negotiations between Sam Houston and the British Parliament.

The Grant County area became more treasured in 1850 when the federal government agreed to pay Texas ten million dollars for its claims outside its present state borders. The Territory of Kansas was organized in 1854, including this area, along with all of Colorado to the Rocky Mountains, and reaching north along the Platte River in what is now Nebraska. The city of Denver, Colorado was founded in what was then Arapahoe county, Kansas, and was named for the territorial governor.

State boundaries were defined in 1861 with a total of 44,509 square miles of land, including the gold fields in the Rocky Mountains. This proposal was initially rejected until concerns of "the possible development of this region as grazing areas" for eastern Kansas farmers allowed the state to be admitted.

== Establishment of County Boundaries ==
In 1873, the portion of Kansas west of Range 25 was divided into 25 new counties: Decatur, Rawlins, Cheyenne, Sheridan, Thomas, Sherman, Lane, Buffalo, Foote, Meade, Scott, Sequoyah, Arapahoe, Seward, Wichita, Kearny, Greeley, Hamilton, Stanton, Kansas, Stevens, and Grant.

Grant County was named after Ulysses S Grant, the 18th President of the United States (1869–1877). The initial survey establishing county boundaries was conducted in the summer of 1874.

In 1883, the Kearny, Sequoyah, Arapahoe, Kansas, Stevens, Meade, Clark and Grant counties disappeared while the Hamilton, Ford, Seward, and Hodgeman counties enlarged and Finney County was instated. Grant County was split with the western portion becoming a part of Hamilton County and the eastern portion becoming a part of the newly created Finney County.

On June 9, 1888, Grant County was again established as part of Kansas with its original county boundaries, with the first officers of the new Grant County being sworn in on June 18, 1888.

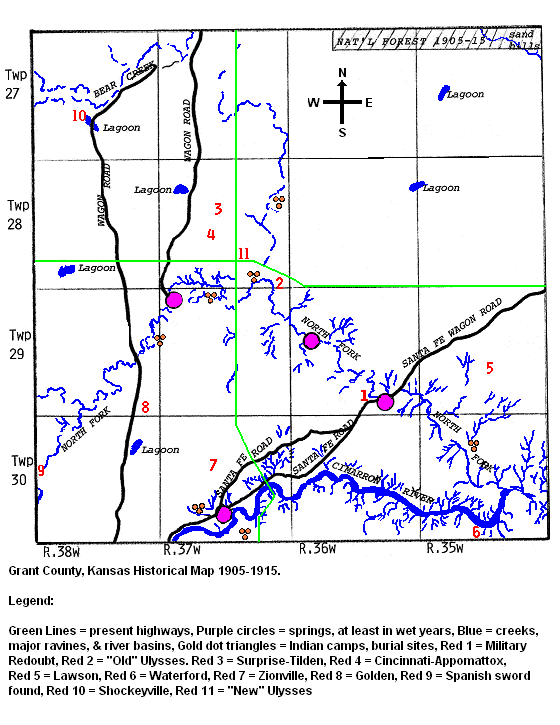
Legend: Green Lines = present highways; Purple circles = springs (in wet years); Blue = creeks, major ravines, & river basins; Gold dot triangles = native camps, burial sites; Red 1 = Military Redoubt; Red 2 = "Old" Ulysses; Red 3 = Surprise-Tilden; Red 4 = Cincinnati-Appomattox; Red 5 = Lawson; Red 6 = Waterford; Red 7 = Zionville; Red 8 = Golden; Red 9 = Spanish sword found; Red 10 = Shockeyville; Red 11 = "New" Ulysses

In October 1888, the county seat election for Grant County resulted in victory for Ulysses, Kansas. The election results were:

Ulysses = 578
Appomattox = 268
Shockeyville = 41
Golden = 31
Spurgeon = 2

== Early settlements ==
All town sites have been vacated by an act of the state legislature, with the exception of New Ulysses (now simply “Ulysses”) and Hickok.

=== Old / New Ulysses ===
- "Old" Ulysses was located on S36-T-28-R37 and established in 1885. The town contained about 1500 inhabitants, supplying four hotels, twelve restaurants, twelve saloons, a bank, six gambling houses, a large schoolhouse, a church, a newspaper office and an opera house. Old Ulysses was eventually moved to New Ulysses in 1909.
- "New" Ulysses - The original townsite of New Ulysses, established June 30, 1909 (per plat map filing date), is located on the southwest quarter of S27-T28-R37. City limit perimeters currently encompass a much larger area due to municipal expansion caused by additions and subdivisions.

=== Surprise-Tilden ===
Located on S16-T28-R37, Surprise was established in 1885. John Arthur, E. R. Watkins, Frederick Ausmus, Henry H. Cochran, and George W. Cook were some of the early day settlers. The name of the local post office was changed to Tilden in 1887.

=== Cincinnati-Appomattox ===
Located on S28-T28-R37, Cincinnati was established in 1887. The name was later changed to Appomattox. The town had a population of about 1,000 people and was the chief contender for the county seat.

=== Shockey (Shockeyville) ===
Located on S29-T27-R38, Shockey was established in 1886 and grew to a town of fifty inhabitants.

=== Golden ===
Located on S34-T29-R38, Golden was established in 1886 with a population of fifty people. The Golden cemetery is located nearby the old village.

=== Zionville ===
Located on S16-T30-R37, Zionville was established in 1885. M. M. Wilson, one of the early settlers, erected a store building which became the center of activity within the town. Sunday School and church services were held in the Wilson home. This town was about ten miles south of New Ulysses, with the Zionville cemetery slightly southwest.

=== Lawson ===
Located on S27-T29-R35, Lawson was established in 1886. The population of the town was twenty-five people.

=== Waterford ===
Located on S33-T30-R35, Waterford was established in 1886 as an Irish-populated settlement on the border of the Grant and Stevens county lines near the Cimarron River.

=== Gognac ===
Located on S36-T28-R39, Gognac (or Goguac) was established in 1885 in Stanton County, Kansas; however, its post office was later moved to Grant County, Kansas. The town consisted of one building and a store and post office combined.

=== Spurgeon ===
Located on S28-T27-R35, Spurgeon had a population of fifteen inhabitants and remained populated for just four years.

=== Rock Island ===
The town was originally intended to be located on S26-T28-R37, but was never developed. Although many lots were sold, some of them to buyers who never saw the land itself, no new construction or improvements were conducted in the land.

=== Hickok ===
Hickok is located on S2-T29-R36. The town plat was filed on May 15, 1928, and a small unincorporated community currently inhabits the area.
