= Black-and-white fairywren =

Black-and-white fairywren may refer to:

- White-shouldered fairywren, a species of bird found in New Guinea
- Two subspecies of the white-winged fairywren, found in Australia
