= Hickok =

Hickok may refer to:

== People ==
- Dewey K. Hickok, American inventor
- Elizabeth Hickok Robbins Stone, American pioneer
- Eugene W. Hickok (born 1951), American education advocate
- Kramer Hickok, American professional golfer
- Laurens Perseus Hickok (1798–1888), American philosopher
- Lorena Hickok (1893–1968), American journalist
- Orrin Hickok (1838–1903), American harness racing trainer and owner
- Wild Bill Hickok (1837–1876), American scout and gunfighter
- William Hickok (1874-1933), American football player and industrialist

== Other uses ==
- Hickok, Kansas, United States
- Hickok (film), a 2017 movie
- Hickok45, real name Greg Kinman, American YouTuber featuring videos about firearms

== See also ==
- Hickok Belt
- Hickox (disambiguation)
- Hitchcock (disambiguation)
