= Favaloro =

Favaloro is a surname. Notable people with the surname include:

- René Favaloro (1923–2000), Argentine cardiologist
- Norman Joseph Favaloro (1905–1989), Australian solicitor and ornithologist

The name Favaloro derives from the Sicilian term Favaloru, referring to a grower or seller of beans or, alternatively, a scrounger.

Notable places with the name Favaloro include:

- Molo Favaloro, in Lampedusa, Sicily
- Villino Favaloro, in Palermo, Sicily
