= Lincoln Township, Grant County, Kansas =

Lincoln Township
- Township
- Location in Grant County
- Coordinates: 37°33′30″N 101°19′47″W
- Country: United States
- State: Kansas
- County: Grant

Area
  - Total: 143.90 sq mi (372.71 km^{2})
  - Land: 143.77 sq mi (372.35 km^{2})
  - Water: 0.14 sq mi (0.37 km^{2}) 0.1%
- Elevation: 2,982 ft (909 m)

Population (2020)
  - Total: 6,644
  - Density: 46.21/sq mi (17.84/km^{2})
- GNIS feature ID: 0470609

Lincoln Township is a township in Grant County, Kansas, United States. As of the 2020 census, its population was 6,644.

== Geography ==
Lincoln Township covers an area of 143.91 square miles (372.7 km^{2}) and contains one incorporated settlement, Ulysses (the county seat). According to the USGS, it contains one cemetery, Ulysses.

== Transportation ==
Lincoln Township contains one airport or landing strip, Ulysses Airport.
