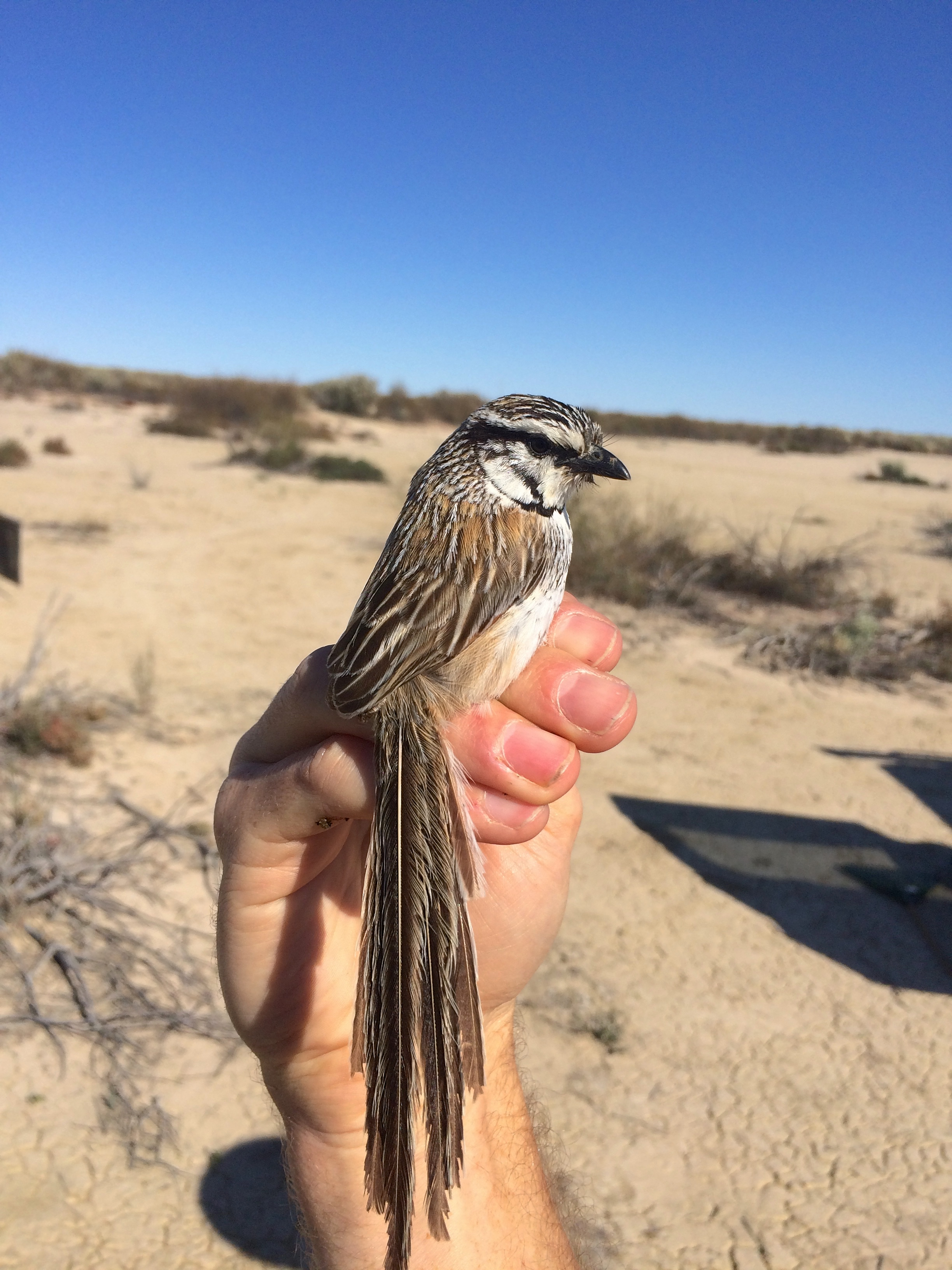
- Grey grasswren - Narriearra (north-western New South Wales)

Conservation status
- Least Concern (IUCN 3.1)

Scientific classification
- Kingdom: Animalia
- Phylum: Chordata
- Class: Aves
- Order: Passeriformes
- Family: Maluridae
- Genus: Amytornis
- Species: A. barbatus

Binomial name
- Amytornis barbatus Favaloro & McEvey, 1968

Subspecies
- See text
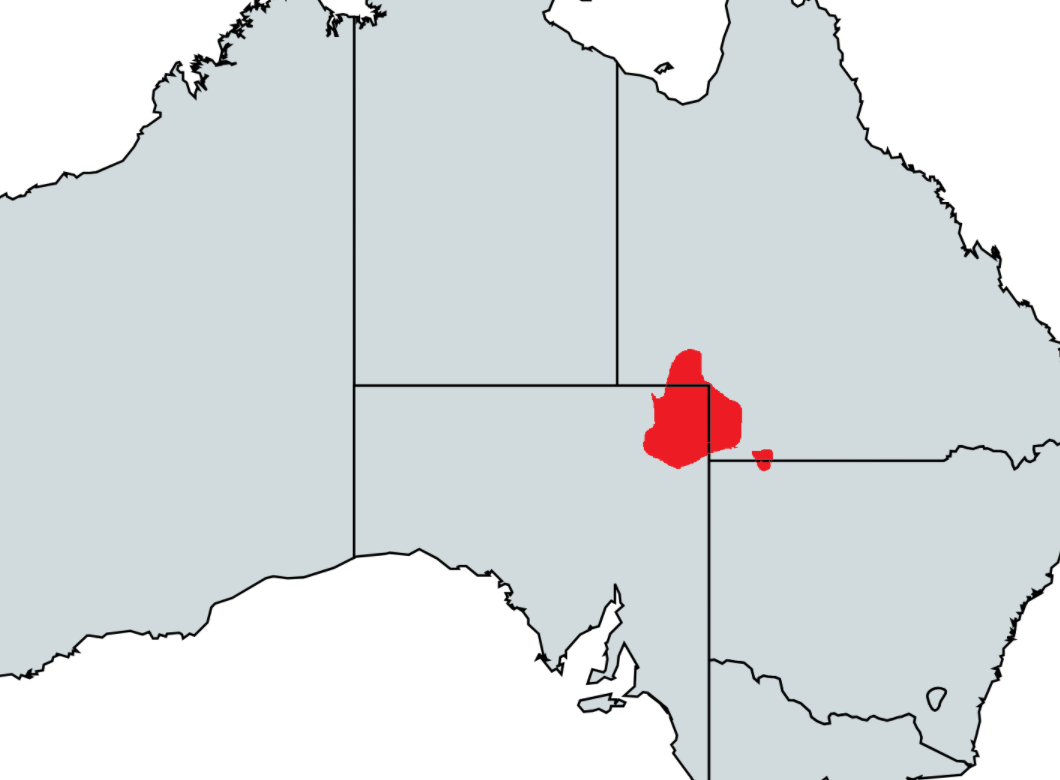
- Distribution

= Grey grasswren =

Species of bird

The grey grasswren (Amytornis barbatus) is a passerine bird in the Australasian wren family, Maluridae. It is found on arid inland floodplains of Australia where it is endemic. The grey grasswren is a rarely seen elusive bird that was first sighted in 1921 but not taxonomically described until 1968. Its greyish coloration and very long tail distinguish it from all other grasswrens. While some recent research has been conducted, there still remain many gaps in the knowledge about the ecology of this cryptic bird.

== Taxonomy and systematics ==
The grey grasswren is classified in the family Maluridae which comprises five genera of birds that are found only in Australia and New Guinea.

=== Subspecies ===
Two subspecies are recognized:

- A. b. barbatus – Favaloro & McEvey, 1968: found in the Bulloo River watershed (south-western Queensland and north-western New South Wales, Australia)
- A. b. diamantina – Schodde & Christidis, 1987: found in the Diamantina River watershed (extreme south-western Queensland and north-eastern South Australia, Australia)

== Description ==
The grey grasswren is a small bird with a length ranging between 18 and 20 cm, a wing span of approximately 21 cm and a weight between 15 and 23 g. Its general colour is ginger-brown suffused with grey and off-white striations. Schrodde and Christidis recorded that "the face is patterned black and white with broad white superciliary stripe and black stripe from lores through eyes linked to thin black malar line around sides of throat; tail greatly attenuated with tapered rectrices, the center pair of which extend > 5mm beyond the adjacent pair; no sexual dimorphism in colour of flanks or belly". Juvenile color is duller although similar to the adults and with no distinct facial pattern. Moult is poorly understood but thought to occur annually after breeding and between October and December.

=== Vocalisations ===
Favaloro and McEvey described the call of the grey grasswren as a soft double-syllable note which the bird tweeted persistently. Joseph also noted that calls were given constantly over several minutes with a series of three or four high pitched metallic notes, sounding like pit-choo. Carpenter described the call as a high pitched sit-sit-sit.

== Distribution and habitat ==
The grey grasswren occupies a restrictive area of arid inland floodplains of central Australia. Sightings have occurred at the Bulloo Overflow in the New South Wales/Queensland border area, lower Cooper Creek, along the Kallakoopah anabranch of the Diamantina River and the overflow areas of lakes Machattie, Koolivoo and Mipea on Eyre Creek in South Australia. These birds frequent mainly floodplains of the above systems which contain areas dominated by lignum and cane grass on major drainage lines between resident sand dunes. In some swampy areas, a dense understory of spike-rush, channel millet, and sedges are present. The grey grasswren has also been known to occupy open vegetative areas well beyond the lignum swamps which are less subject to inundation during flood events. It appears that in drought years the grey grasswren occupies tall dense lignum as a refuge while in normal years it prefers other habitats. Hardy recorded significantly more captures in declared drought years than in normal years.

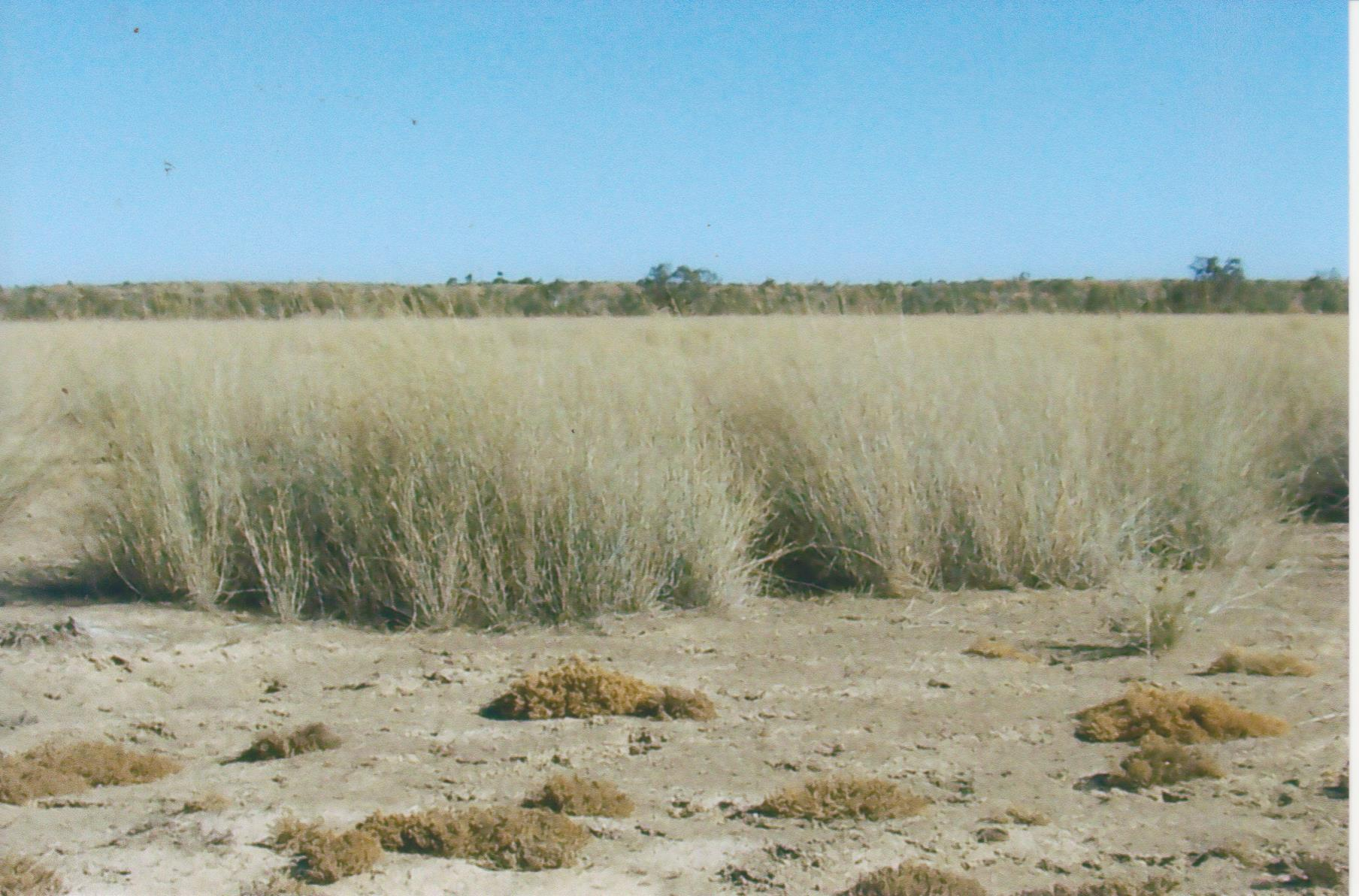
Grey grasswren habitat

During 2011, an extensive grey grasswren survey was conducted at Frome Swamp in New South Wales which had recently experienced substantial rainfall and resultant lignum and cane grass growth. Despite the use of exhaustive surveys using mist netting, playback, vocal and visual methods, no grey grasswrens were located. This result could suggest that the species may be nomadic, an observation previously made by Hardy arising from his surveys in 2002 and 2003 at another location.

== Behavior and ecology ==
=== Breeding ===
The breeding behaviour of this species has not been extensively documented but it is thought that the species breeds in July/August usually after flooding or heavy rain. However, Hardy recorded breeding during heavy drought conditions with no local surface water in the study area for at least seven years. The semi-domed nest is built in lignum or cane grass, between 30 and 75 cm above ground level. Favaloro and McEvey noted that the nest was a large well camouflaged nest, very loosely constructed from grass with a large opening on the side. Clutch size is thought to be two eggs with an average weight of 2.4 g. Egg color is dull, white speckled all over with nutmeg brown, nutmeg to reddish-brown or cinnamon brown markings. There is considerable colour variation between eggs within the nest and also between nests. The female is solely responsible for the incubation of the eggs which is estimated at 13 to 15 days. Both parents attend to the feeding of the hatchlings and no details are known of its breeding success.

=== Feeding ===
The shape of the beak suggests that the grey grasswren's diet consists mainly of seed and an analysis of the gut content of a specimen confirmed the presence of mainly small seeds of different plants, two small ants and the remains of small Coleoptera. However, other researchers have noted that insect larvae are the dominant food source supplemented by mature insects and water snails.

=== Age and population size ===
Little is known about its life expectancy but research conducted at one of its prime lignum habitats found from capture/re-capture surveys that this bird reached at least three years of age in that study area. The population of the grey grasswren is highly variable and subject to 'boom and bust' conditions, depending on prevailing climate within its range in the arid interior. Based upon the capture/re-capture method undertaken by Hardy in drought conditions, the New South Wales population was estimated at 1600 birds or 0.2 per hectare. Extrapolation of this to reach an estimate of its Australian population should be viewed with caution due to its geographic range, seasonal and habitat variability.

== Status and conservation ==
The grey grasswren is listed as threatened under the national Environment Protection and Biodiversity Conservation Act 1999 (EPBC Act); it is listed as endangered under the Biodiversity Conservation Act 2016 in New South Wales and in Queensland under the Nature Conservation Act 1992, while the South Australian National Parks and Wildlife Act 1972 lists the species as rare. The IUCN Red List rates it as a species of least concern.

=== Future management ===
Research on the grey grasswren is limited and there have been few recent studies into the ecology of this elusive bird. As it occupies specific habitats, the major threat is habitat degradation through overgrazing and trampling by cattle, rabbits, and feral pigs, predation by cats and invasive weeds. A dependence on lignum and associated plant groups also makes the species vulnerable to catastrophic events such as drought and fire. The consequences of climate change also need further consideration to ensure that the grey grasswren continues to exist in arid regions of central Australia through the preservation of suitable areas.

=== New conservation area ===
In June 2020 the Government of New South Wales acquired 153,415 ha (379,100 acres), or 1,534 km^{2} (592 sq mi) of private land for a new national park, when it purchased Narriearra station in the state's far north-west. The area includes "ephemeral wetlands and landscapes" that had not previously been included in the state's conservation areas. Together with the nearby Sturt National Park, there would be a nearly contiguous conservation area of about 500,000 ha (1,200,000 acres), which is twice the size of the Australian Capital Territory. The new property lies next to the Pindera Downs Aboriginal area, which is rich in cultural artefacts of Aboriginal Australians. It is the largest ever purchase of private land for conservation in the state. The Dingo Fence on the border with Queensland forms the northern boundary of the property.

Nearly 90 percent of the grey grasswren's habitat lies within Narriearra Station, so this is a significant move towards protecting the bird. The Tibooburra Local Aboriginal Land Council has been invited to suggest a name for the new park.
