= Hitchcock (surname) =

Origin
- Word/name: Wiltshire/Essex, England
- Meaning: son of "Richard"

Hitchcock is a surname. Notable people with the surname include:

- Adolphus F. Hitchcock (1803–1888), American farmer and politician
- Alf Hitchcock (1958–2017), British police officer
- Alfred Hitchcock (1899–1980), English film director
- Almeda Eliza Hitchcock (1863–1895), Hawaii lawyer
- A. S. Hitchcock (1865–1935), American botanist and agrostologist
- Billy Hitchcock (1916–2006), American baseball player
- Carol Hitchcock (born 1959), Australian singer
- Charles B. Hitchcock (died 1875), American politician
- Charles Henry Hitchcock (1836–1919), American geologist
- Charles Leo Hitchcock (1902–1986), American botanist
- Christopher Hitchcock (born 1964), American philosopher
- Daniel Hitchcock (1739–1777), American military officer
- Daniel Hitchcock (politician) (1908–1996) (Tasmania), Australian member of the Tasmanian Legislative Council
- Dave Hitchcock (1949–2026), English former record producer
- David Hitchcock (comics writer), an English comics writer and artist
- David Howard Hitchcock (1861–1943), an American/Hawaiian painter
- Edward Hitchcock (1793–1864), President of Amherst College and geologist
- Edward Griffin Hitchcock (1837–1898), Marshal of Hawaii
- Ethan A. Hitchcock (general) (1798–1870), U.S. Army general
- Ethan A. Hitchcock (Interior) (1835–1909), United States Secretary of the Interior
- Flora Zabelle Hitchcock (1880–1968), American Broadway actress
- Frank H. Hitchcock (1867–1935), American politician and Postmaster General
- Frank Lauren Hitchcock (1875–1957), American mathematician and physicist
- George Hitchcock (artist) (1850–1913), American artist
- George B. Hitchcock (1812–1872), American abolitionist
- George Hitchcock (poet) (1914–2010), U.S. poet and publisher of Kayak magazine
- Gilbert Hitchcock (1859–1934), U.S. Representative and Senator from Nebraska
- Harvey Rexford Hitchcock (1800–1855), American missionary to Hawaii
- Henry Hitchcock (1792–1839), first Attorney General of Alabama
- Henry-Russell Hitchcock (1903–1987), American architectural historian
- Henry Smith Hitchcock (died 1929), Australian aircraft mechanic
- Herbert E. Hitchcock (1867–1958), U.S. Senator from South Dakota
- James Ernest Hitchcock (1956–2026), American executed child murderer
- Jeremy Hitchcock (born 1981), American Internet company CEO
- Jimmy Hitchcock (1911–1959), American football and baseball player
- Jimmy Hitchcock (cornerback) (born 1970), American football player
- Jimmy Hitchcock (golfer) (1930–2015), English golfer
- Karen R. Hitchcock (1943–2019), Principal and Vice-Chancellor of Queen's University, Kingston, Ontario
- Ken Hitchcock (born 1951), Canadian National Hockey League coach
- Kevin Hitchcock (born 1962), English goalkeeper
- Lambert Hitchcock (1795–1852), American furniture designer
- Margaret Hitchcock (1883–1967), New Zealand nurse who served in World War I
- Mary Evelyn Hitchcock (1849–1920), American author, traveler
- Michael Hitchcock (born 1958), American actor, comedian, screenwriter, and television producer
- Nicola Hitchcock, British singer, songwriter and record producer
- Nigel Hitchcock (born 1971), English jazz saxophonist
- Patricia Hitchcock (1928–2021), actress and daughter of Alfred Hitchcock
- Paul Hitchcock (born 1975), New Zealand cricketer
- Peter Hitchcock (1781–1853) Chief Justice, Ohio Supreme Court
- Phineas Hitchcock (1831–1881) U.S. Senator from Nebraska
- Ray Hitchcock (born 1965), American football player
- Raymond Hitchcock (actor) (1865–1929), American stage and screen actor
- Raymond Hitchcock (author) (1922–1992), English novelist and screenwriter
- Raymond Hitchcock (cricketer) (1929–2019), New Zealand cricketer
- Reginald Ingram Montgomery Hitchcock, birth name of Rex Ingram (director) (1892–1950), Irish film director, producer, writer, and actor
- Ripley Hitchcock (1857–1918), American editor
- Robert Hitchcock (born 1944), Australian sculptor
- Robert Hitchcock (dramatist) (died 1809), English dramatist
- Robyn Hitchcock (born 1953), English singer/songwriter
- Rufus Wilber Hitchcock (1868–1961), American educator, newspaper publisher, and politician
- Roswell Dwight Hitchcock (1817–1887), American theologian
- Russell Hitchcock (born 1949), Australian lead singer of the duo Air Supply
- Simon C. Hitchcock (c. 1801–1878), New York politician
- Sterling Hitchcock (born 1971), American baseball pitcher
- Sylvia Hitchcock (1946–2015), 1967 Miss Universe
- Tommy Hitchcock (1860–1941), American polo player and horse trainer
- Tommy Hitchcock Jr. (1900–1944), American World War I and II pilot and polo player
- Warren Billingsley Hitchcock (1919–1984), Australian ornithologist
- Zina Hitchcock (1755–1832), New York politician

== See also ==
- Justice Hitchcock (disambiguation)
- Hitchcox
