= Raymond Hitchcock =

Raymond or Ray Hitchcock may refer to:

- Raymond Hitchcock (actor) (1865–1929), American stage and screen actor
- Raymond Hitchcock (author) (1922–1992), English novelist and screenwriter
- Ray Hitchcock (cricketer) (1929–2019), New Zealand cricketer
- Ray Hitchcock (born 1965), American football player whose given name is Raeburn

== See also ==
- Hitchcock (disambiguation)
