= Hitchcox =

Hitchcox is a surname. Notable people with this surname include:

- Alan Hitchcox (born 1938), Australian cricketer
- Jy Hitchcox (born 1989), Australian rugby league footballer

== See also ==
- Hitchcock (surname)
