= Sullivans Tracks, Kansas =

Unincorporated community in Grant County, Kansas

Coordinates: 37°33′50″N 101°27′12″W

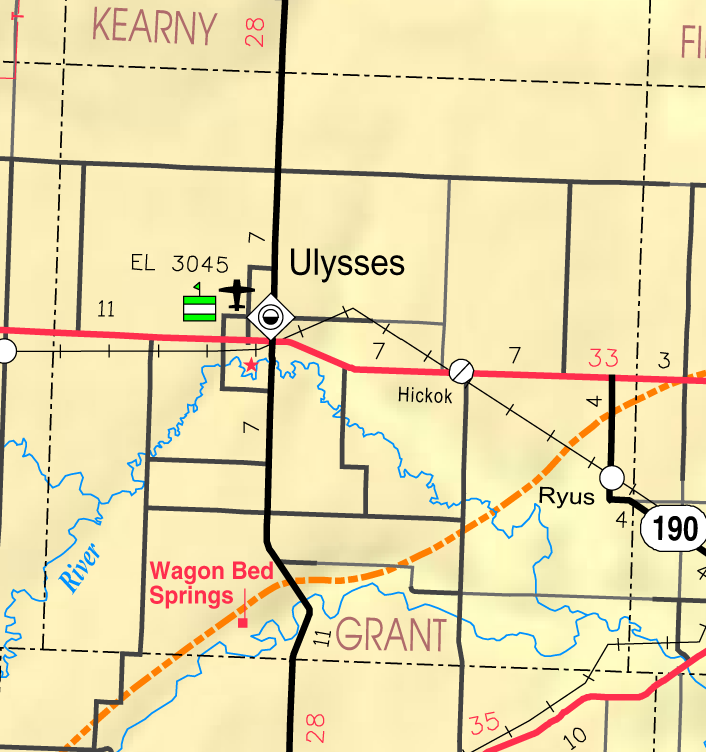
Map of Grant County from KDOT (map legend)

Sullivans Tracks is an unincorporated community in Grant County, Kansas, United States. It lies on the border of Sherman and Sullivan Townships, at the intersection of the Cimarron Valley Railroad with Roads E and 13, 6 miles (9 km) west-southwest of the county seat of Ulysses.
