= Ryus, Kansas =

Unincorporated community in Grant County, Kansas

Coordinates: 37°29′52″N 101°06′30″W

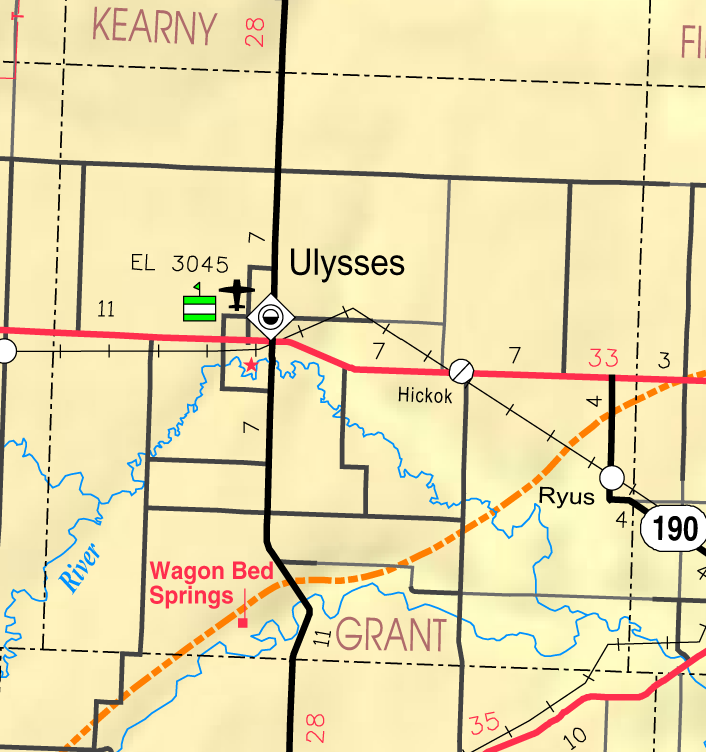
Map of Grant County from KDOT (map legend)

Ryus is an unincorporated community in Grant County, Kansas, United States. It lies in northeastern Sullivan Township at the intersection of the Cimarron Valley Railroad with K-190, 14 miles (22 km) southeast of the county seat of Ulysses.

== See also ==
- Santa Fe Trail
