= Hickox =

Hickox may refer to:

== Hickox ==
- Anthony Hickox (born 1959), English film director
- April Hickox (1955–2025), Canadian artist, photographer, teacher and curator
- Benjamin Hickox (1686–1745), American deacon and politician
- Charlie Hickcox (1947–2010), American Olympic swimmer
- Dick Hickox (1938–2006), American basketball player
- Douglas Hickox (1929–1988), English film and television director
- Ed Hickox (umpire) (born 1962), American umpire in Major League Baseball
- Edward J. Hickox (1878–1966), American basketball coach and administrator
- Elizabeth Hickox (c. 1872–1947), Wiyot master basket weaver
- Emma E. Hickox (born 1964), British film editor
- Harry Hickox (1910–1994), American character actor
- Jamie Hickox (born 1964), English and Canadian professional squash player
- Laurie Hickox (1945–1961), American pair skater
- Malcolm Hickox (born 1946), sprint canoeist
- Ralph Hickox (1903–1942), American naval officer
- Richard Hickox (1948 –2008), English conductor
- Sidney Hickox (1895–1982), American cinematographer
- William Hickox (1942–1961), American pair skater

== Other uses ==
- Hickox, Georgia, United States, a census-designated place
- USS Hickox (DD-673), an American destroyer

== See also ==
- Hickok (disambiguation)
- Hickcox, a surname
