= Hickcox =

Hickcox is a surname. Notable people with the surname include:

- Charlie Hickcox (1947–2010), American swimmer
- John Howard Hickcox Sr. (1832–1897), American librarian, bookseller, and numismatist

== See also ==
- Hickox (disambiguation)
