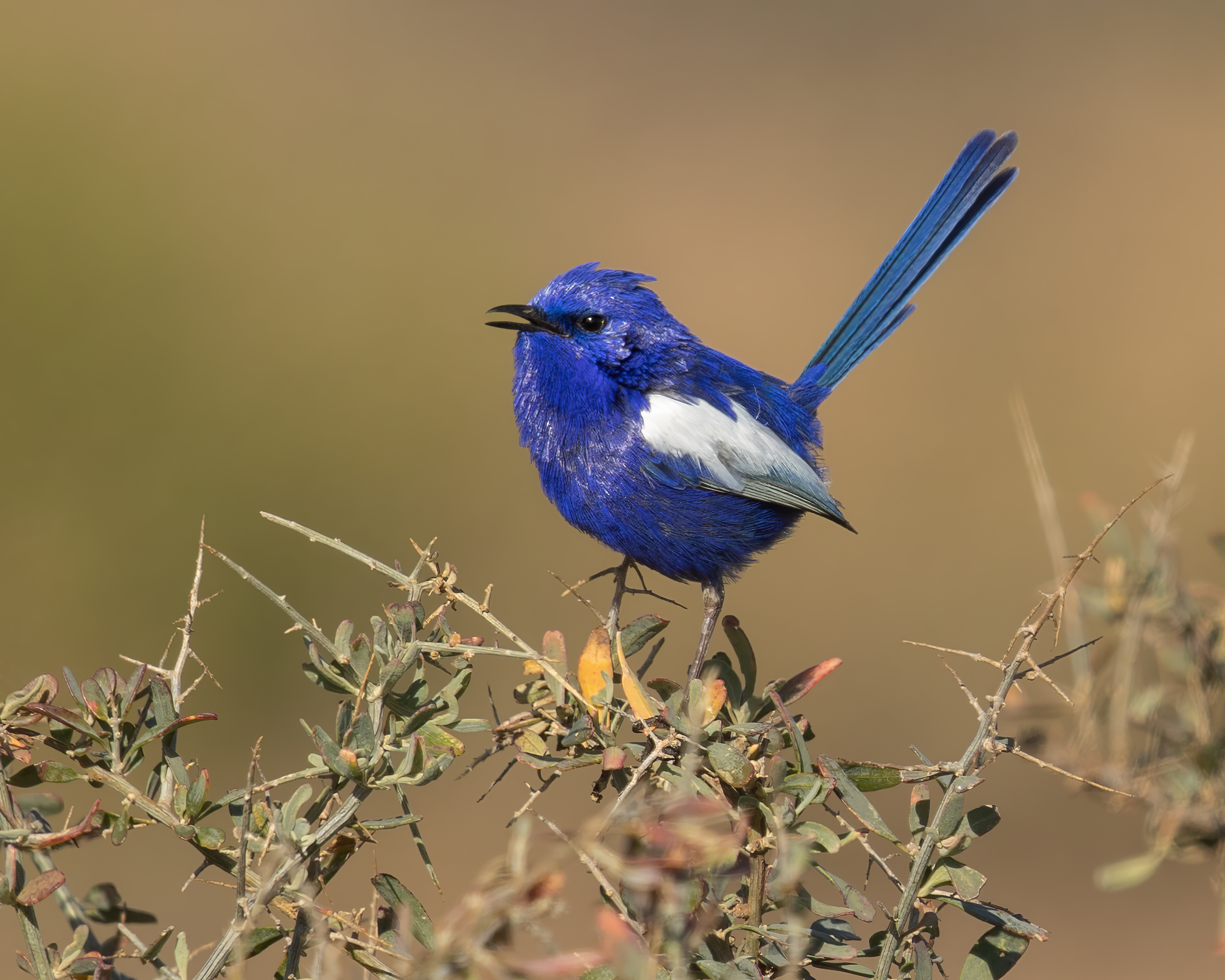
- Male
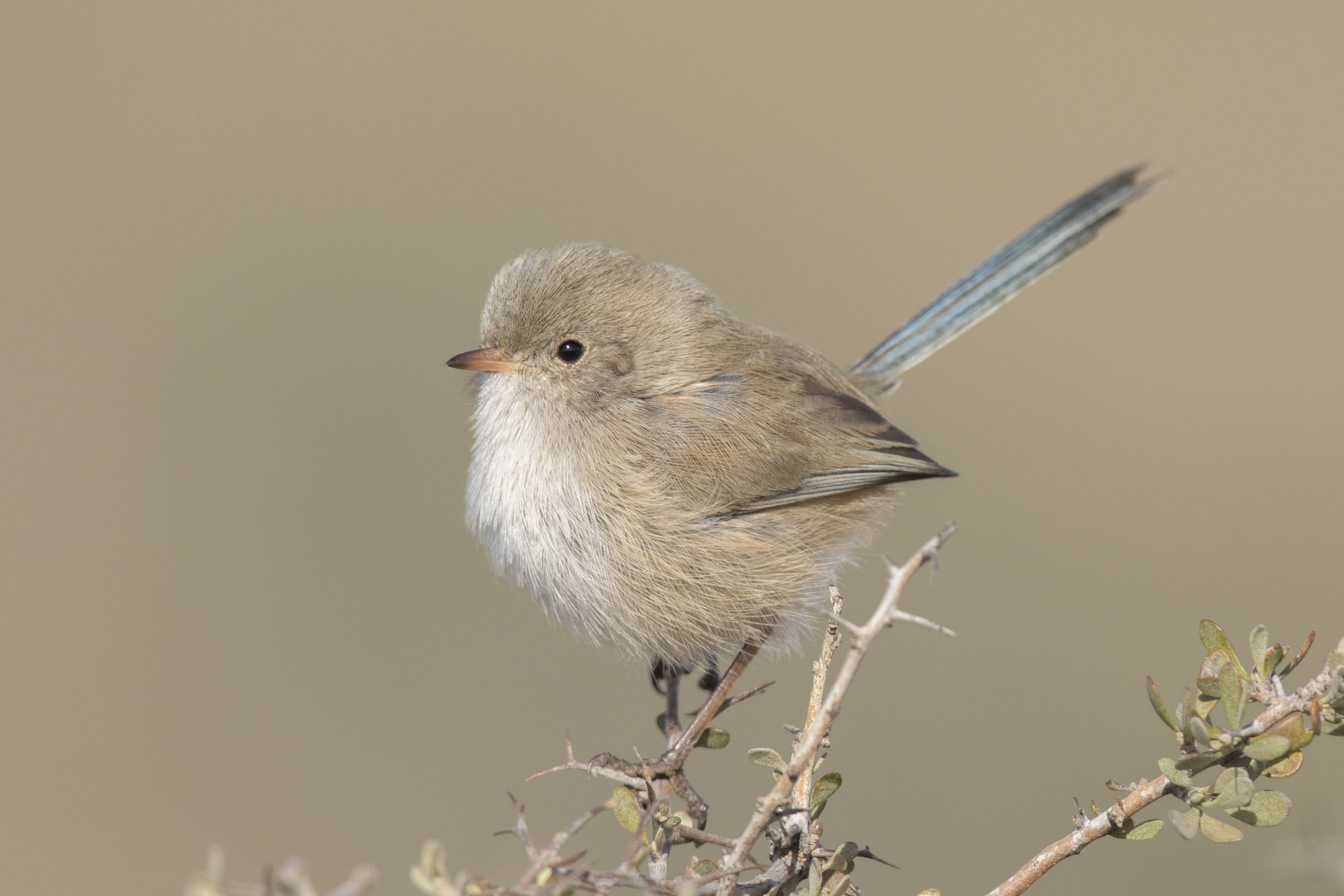
- Female

Conservation status
- Least Concern (IUCN 3.1)

Scientific classification
- Kingdom: Animalia
- Phylum: Chordata
- Class: Aves
- Order: Passeriformes
- Family: Maluridae
- Genus: Malurus
- Species: M. leucopterus

Binomial name
- Malurus leucopterus Quoy & Gaimard, 1824

Subspecies
- M. l. leucopterus; M. l. edouardi; M. l. leuconotus
- White-winged fairywren range

= White-winged fairywren =

Australian species of bird

The white-winged fairywren (Malurus leucopterus) is a species of passerine bird in the Australasian wren family, Maluridae. It lives in the drier parts of Central Australia; from central Queensland and South Australia across to Western Australia. Like other fairywrens, this species displays marked sexual dimorphism and one or more males of a social group grow brightly coloured plumage during the breeding season. The female is sandy-brown with light-blue tail feathers; it is smaller than the male, which, in breeding plumage, has a bright-blue body, black bill, and white wings. Younger sexually mature males are almost indistinguishable from females and are often the breeding males. In spring and summer, a troop of white-winged fairywrens has a brightly coloured older male accompanied by small, inconspicuous brown birds, many of which are also male. Three subspecies are recognised. Apart from the mainland subspecies, one is found on Dirk Hartog Island, and another on Barrow Island off the coast of Western Australia. Males from these islands have black rather than blue breeding plumage.

The white-winged fairywren mainly eats insects, supplementing this with small fruits and leaf buds. It occurs in heathland and arid scrubland, where low shrubs provide cover. Like other fairywrens, it is a cooperative breeding species, and small groups of birds maintain and defend territories year-round. Groups consist of a socially monogamous pair with several helper birds who assist in raising the young. These helpers are progeny that have attained sexual maturity but remain with the family group for one or more years after fledging. Although not yet confirmed genetically, the white-winged fairywren may be promiscuous and assist in raising the young from other pairings. As part of a courtship display, the male wren plucks petals from flowers and displays them to female birds.

== Taxonomy and systematics ==
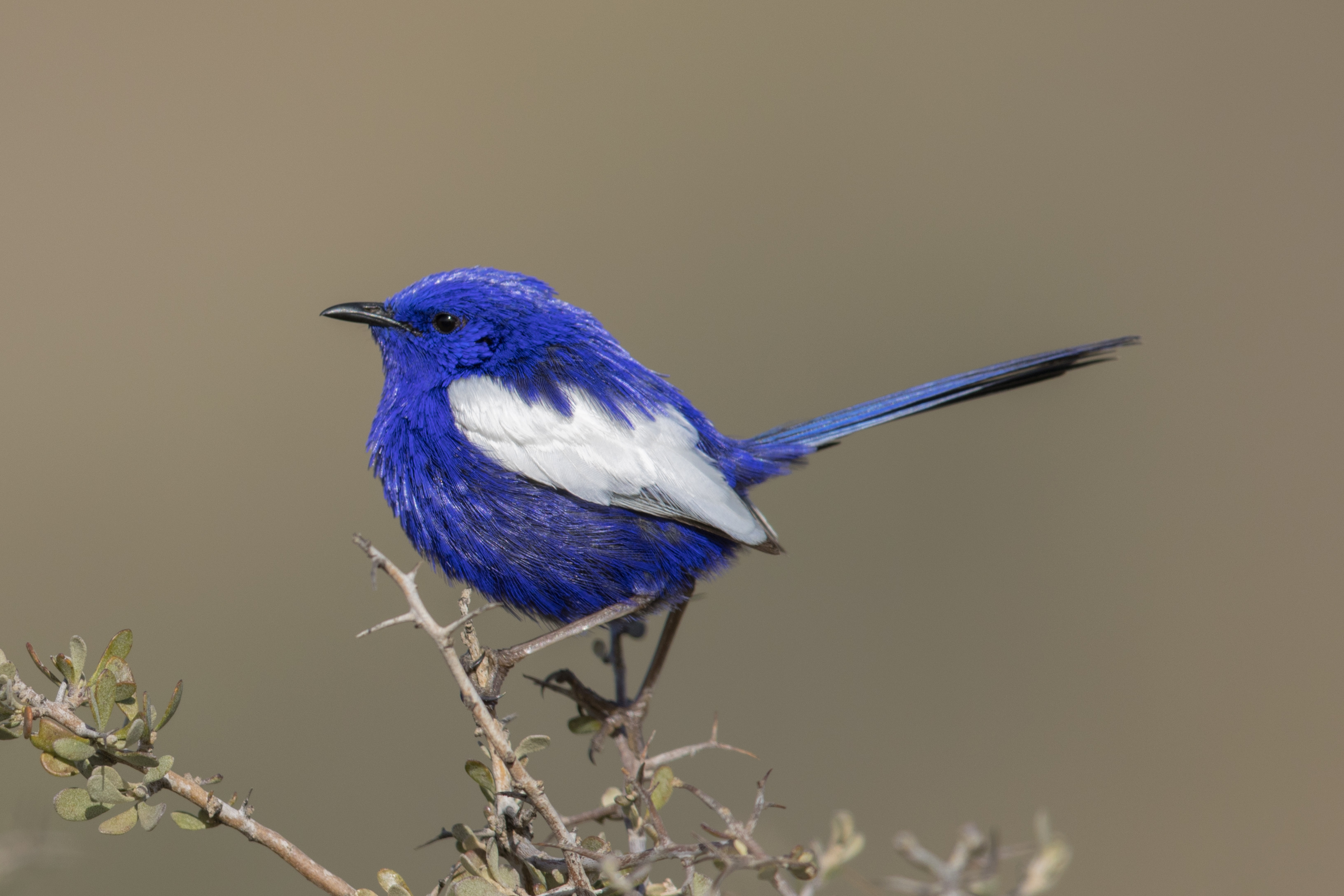
Near Port Augusta, South Australia

A specimen of the white-winged fairywren was first collected by French naturalists Jean René Constant Quoy and Joseph Paul Gaimard in September 1818, on Louis de Freycinet's voyage around the Southern Hemisphere. The specimen was subsequently lost in a shipwreck, but a painting entitled Mérion leucoptère by Jacques Arago survived and led to the bird's description in 1824 by French ornithologist Charles Dumont de Sainte-Croix. The name for the species was derived from the Ancient Greek leuko- "white" and pteron "wing".

Ironically, the original specimen was of the black-plumaged subspecies from Dirk Hartog Island, which was not recorded again for 80 years. Meanwhile, the widespread blue-plumaged subspecies was discovered and described as two separate species by John Gould in 1865. He called one specimen collected from inland New South Wales the white-winged superb warbler (M. cyanotus), while another, which appeared to have a white back and wings, was described as the white-backed superb warbler (M. leuconotus). It was not until the early 20th century that both of these blue-plumaged mainland forms were found to be of a single species. George Mack, ornithologist of the National Museum of Victoria, considered the specific name leuconotus to take precedence in his 1934 revision of the genus, and more recent studies have followed suit. The back region between the shoulders is in fact bare, with feathers that arise from the shoulder (scapular) region and sweep inwards in different patterns. This variation confused the early naturalists who described the white-backed and blue-backed species.

The white-winged fairywren was often referred to as the blue-and-white wren, and early observers, such as Norman Favaloro of Victoria, refer to them by this name. However, like other fairywrens, the white-winged fairywren is unrelated to the true wren (family Troglodytidae). Other alternative names used include the white-backed fairywren, white-backed wren and white-winged wren. It was previously classified as a member of the Old World flycatcher family, Muscicapidae, and later as a member of the warbler family, Sylviidae, before they were placed in the newly recognised Australasian wren family, Maluridae, in 1975. More recently, DNA analysis has shown the family Maluridae to be related to the family Meliphagidae (honeyeaters), and the Pardalotidae (pardalotes, scrubwrens, thornbills, gerygones and allies) in the large superfamily Meliphagoidea.

The white-winged fairywren is one of eleven species in the genus Malurus. It is most closely related to the Australian red-backed fairywren, with which it makes up a phylogenetic clade with the white-shouldered fairywren of New Guinea as the next closest relative. Termed the bicoloured wrens by ornithologist Richard Schodde, these three species are notable for their lack of head patterns and ear tufts and their uniform black or blue plumage with contrasting shoulder or wing colour; they replace each other geographically across northern Australia and New Guinea.

=== Subspecies ===
There are three recognised subspecies. Both black-plumaged forms have been called the black-and-white fairywren and black-and-white wren.

- M. l. leucopterus - Dumont, 1824 Range of the nominate subspecies is restricted to Dirk Hartog Island, off the western coast of Australia, and nuptial males display black-and-white plumage. This subspecies is the smallest of the three and bears a proportionally longer tail. It was collected again in 1916 by Tom Carter, 98 years after de Freycinet's expedition collected the type specimen.
- M. l. edouardi - Campbell, A.J, 1901: Originally described as a separate species, this subspecies, like the nominate subspecies, have black-and-white coloured males, but are found only on Barrow Island, also off the western coast of Australia. Birds of this subspecies are larger than those of the nominate subspecies but have a shorter tail. The female has a more cinnamon tinge to her plumage than the grey-brown of the other two subspecies.
- Blue-and-white fairywren (M. l. leuconotus) - Gould, 1865: Originally described as a separate species, it is endemic to mainland Australia and distinct in that it is the only subspecies to have nuptial males that show prominent blue-and-white plumage. The scientific name of this subspecies is derived from the Ancient Greek leukos 'white' and notos 'back'. Birds in the southern parts of its range tend to be smaller than those in the north.

M. l. leucopterus and M. l. edouardi are both generally smaller than their mainland relatives, and both subspecies tend to have smaller family groups that consist of only one male and one female, with an occasional helper bird. While the island subspecies and mainland species have been found to have similar social structure, breeding pairs on both islands have, on average, smaller clutches, longer incubation times, and fewer live fledglings. Additionally, while M. l. leuconotus is considered of least concern by the IUCN due to its widespread occurrence, both island subspecies are considered vulnerable by the Australian government due to their delicate nesting sites that are easily disturbed by human construction and habitation.

=== Evolutionary history ===
Both island subspecies are nearer in genetic distance to mainland populations of leuconotus than to each other; Dirk Hartog Island is 2 kilometres (1.2 mi) from the mainland while Barrow Island is 56 kilometres (35 mi) from the mainland. Gene flow between the populations existed at the beginning of the present interglacial period, some 8,000 to 10,000 years ago, at a time when sea levels were lower and both islands connected with the mainland.

There are three theories as to how the three races of white-winged fairywren could have evolved. The first suggests that black-and-white plumage is an ancestral condition and, following separation of the three populations, blue-and-white plumage evolved in the mainland species. The second hypothesis suggests that black-and-white plumage evolved convergently on the two separate islands. The third suggests that black-and-white plumage evolved once from the blue-and-white ancestral condition, and later the mainland species re-evolved blue plumage.

The distribution of the three bi-coloured fairywren species indicates their ancestors lived across New Guinea and northern Australia in a period when sea levels were lower and the two regions were joined by a land bridge. Populations became separated as sea levels rose, and New Guinea birds evolved into the white-shouldered fairywren, and Australian forms into the red-backed fairywren and the arid-adapted white-winged fairywren.

== Description ==
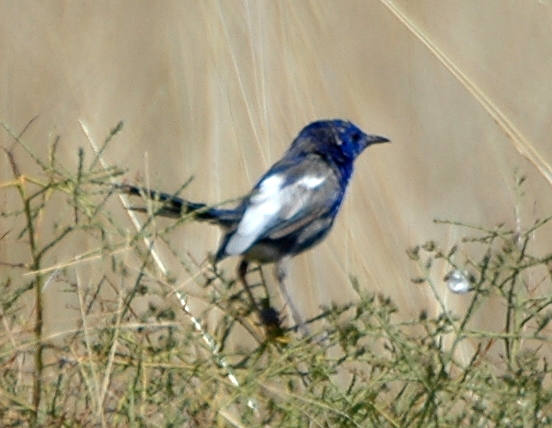
Male (ssp. leuconotus) in partial breeding plumage, Coolmunda Dam, Queensland

Measuring 11 to 13.5 centimetres (4.3 to 5.3 in) in length, white-winged fairywrens are one of the two smallest species of Malurus. Males typically weigh between 7.2 and 10.9 grams (0.25 and 0.38 oz) while females weigh between 6.8 and 11 grams (0.24 and 0.39 oz). Averaging 8.5 mm (0.3 in) in males and 8.4 mm (0.3 in) in females, the bill is relatively long, narrow and pointed and wider at the base. Wider than it is deep, the bill is similar in shape to those of other birds that feed by probing for or picking insects off their environs. It is finer and more pointed in this species than in other fairywrens.

Fully mature adults are sexually dimorphic, with the male being larger and differing in colour from the female. The adult female is sandy-brown with a very light blue tail, and a pinkish buff bill. The male in breeding plumage has a black bill, white wings and shoulders, and a wholly cobalt blue or black body (depending on subspecies). These contrasting white feathers are especially highlighted in flight and ground displays in breeding season. The male in eclipse plumage resembles the female, though it may be distinguished by its darker bill. Both sexes have long, slender, distinct tails held at an upward angle from their bodies. Measuring around 6.25 centimetres (2.46 in), the tail feathers have a white fringe, which disappears with wear.

Nestlings, fledglings, and juveniles have brown plumage and pink-brown bills with shorter tails than adults. Young males develop blue tail feathers and darker bills by late summer or autumn (following a spring or summer breeding season), while young females develop light blue tails. By the subsequent spring, all males are fertile and have developed cloacal protuberances, which store sperm. In contrast, during the breeding season, fertile females develop oedematous brood patches, which are bare areas on their bellies. Males entering their second or third year may develop spotty blue and white plumage during the breeding season. By their fourth year, males have assumed their nuptial plumage, where the scapulars, secondary wing coverts, and secondary flight feathers are white while the rest of their bodies are a vibrant cobalt blue. All sexually mature males moult twice a year, once before the breeding season in winter or spring, and again afterwards in autumn; rarely, a male may moult directly from nuptial to nuptial plumage. The breeding males' blue plumage, particularly the ear-coverts, is highly iridescent due to the flattened and twisted surface of the barbules. The blue plumage also reflects ultraviolet light strongly, and so may be even more prominent to other fairywrens, whose colour vision extends into this part of the spectrum.

=== Vocalisations ===
In 1980, Tideman characterised five different patterns of calls among Malurus leucopterus leuconotus; these were recognised by Pruett and Jones among the island subspecies M. l. edouardi. The main call is a reel made by both sexes in order to establish territory and unify the group. It is a long song of "rising and falling notes" that is first signaled by 3–5 chip notes. Although seemingly weak in sound, the reel carries a long way above the stunted shrubland. A harsh trit call is often used to establish contact (especially between mothers and their young) and to raise alarm; it is characterised by a series of "loud and abrupt" calls that vary in frequency and intensity. Adults will use a high-pitched peep that may be made intermittently with reels as a contact call to birds that are more distant. Nestlings, fledglings, and females around the nest will use high pips—quiet, high-pitched, and short calls. When used by a mature female, they are mixed with harsh calls. Nestlings may also make "gurgling" noises when they are being fed. The subordinate helpers and feeders may also make this sound.

== Distribution and habitat ==
The white-winged fairywren is well adapted to dry environments, and M.l. leuconotus is found throughout arid and semi-arid environments between latitudes 19 and 32^{o}S in mainland Australia. It occupies coastal Western Australia from around Port Hedland south to Perth, and stretches eastwards over to Mount Isa in Queensland, and along the western parts of the Great Dividing Range through central Queensland and central western New South Wales, into the northwestern corner of Victoria and the Eyre Peninsula and across the Nullarbor. It commonly cohabits with other species of fairywren, including the purple-backed fairy-wren (M. lamberti assimilis). White-winged fairywrens often inhabit heathlands or treeless shrublands dominated by saltbush (Atriplex) and small shrubs of the genus Maireana, or grasses such as tussock grass (Triodia) and cane-grass (Zygochloa), as well as floodplain areas vegetated with lignum (Muehlenbeckia florulenta). M. l. leucopterus inhabits similar habitats on Dirk Hartog Island and M. l. edouardi does the same on Barrow Island. The white-winged fairywren is replaced to the north of its range on mainland Australia by the red-backed fairywren.

== Behaviour and ecology ==
The usual form of locomotion is hopping, with both feet leaving the ground and landing simultaneously. However, birds may run when performing the rodent-run display. Its balance is assisted by a proportionally large tail, which is usually held upright and rarely still. The short, rounded wings provide good initial lift and are useful for short flights, though not for extended jaunts.

White-winged fairywrens live in complex social groups. Clans consist of 2–4 birds, typically one brown or partially blue male and a breeding female. Nest helpers are birds raised in previous years which remain with the family group after fledging and assist in raising young; they may be male that have retained their brown plumage, or female. Birds in a group roost side-by-side in dense cover and engage in mutual preening. Several subgroups live within one territory and make up a clan, which is presided over by one blue (or black) male who assumes breeding plumage. While the blue male is dominant to the rest of the brown and partially blue males within his clan, he nests with only one female and contributes to the raising of only her young. It is unclear whether or not he fathers young in any of the other nests within his territory.

Each clan has a specified area of land that all members contribute to foraging from and defending. Frequently, territory sizes, normally 4 to 6 hectares (10 to 15 acres), are correlated with the abundance of rain and resources in a region; smaller territories occur where insects and resources are plentiful. Additionally, the feeding territories are larger during the winter months when these birds spend much of their time foraging with the entire clan. White-winged fairywrens occupy much larger territories than other fairywren species.

Observed in this species, the wing-fluttering display is seen in several situations: females responding, and presumably acquiescing, to male courtship displays, juveniles begging for food, by helpers to older birds, and immature males to senior ones. The fairywren lowers its head and tail, outstretches and quivers its wings and holds its beak open silently.

Both the male and female adult white-winged fairywren may utilise a rodent-run display to distract predators from nests with young birds. The head, neck and tail are lowered, the wings are held out and the feathers are fluffed as the bird runs rapidly and voices a continuous alarm call.

=== Courtship and breeding ===
Fairywrens exhibit one of the highest incidences of extra-pair mating, and many broods are brought up by a male who is not the natural father. However, courtship methods among white-winged fairywrens remain unclear. Blue-plumaged males have been seen outside of their territory and in some cases, carrying pink or purple petals, which among other species advertise the male to neighboring females. In contrast, black-plumaged males on Barrow and Dirk Hartog islands often carry blue petals. While petal-carrying outside of clan territories strongly suggests mating with other females is occurring, further genetic analysis is necessary.

During another courtship display the male bows deeply forward facing the female, reaching the ground with his bill and spreading and flattening his plumage in a near-horizontal plane for up to 20 seconds. In this pose, the white plumage forms a striking white band across his darker plumage.

Breeding females begin to build their nests in the spring and construct domed structures composed of spider webs, fine grasses, thistle-down, and vegetable-down, typically 6 to 14 centimetres (2.4 to 5.5 in) tall and 3 to 9 millimetres (0.12 to 0.35 in) thick. Each nest has a small entrance on one side and they are normally placed in thick shrubs close to the ground. A clutch of 3–4 eggs is generally laid anywhere from September to January, with incubation lasting around 14 days. The white-winged fairywren generally breeds in the spring in the southwest of Western Australia, but is more opportunistic in arid regions of central and northern Australia, with breeding recorded almost any month after a period of rainfall. Incubation is by the breeding female alone, while the breeding male (a brown or blue male) and nest helpers aid in feeding the nestlings and removing their fecal sacs. The newly hatched nestlings are altricial, gaping immediately for food, and developing downy feather tracts and opening their eyes by the third or fourth day. Nestlings remain in the nest for 10–11 days, and fledglings continue to be fed for 3–4 weeks following their departure from the nest. Fledglings then either stay on to help raise the next brood or move to a nearby territory. It is not unusual for a pair bond to hatch and raise two broods in one breeding season, and helpers tend to lessen the stress on the breeding female rather than increase the overall number of feedings. Like other fairywrens, the white-winged fairywren is particularly prone to parasitic nesting by the Horsfield's bronze cuckoo (Chalcites basalis). Parasitism by the shining bronze cuckoo (C. lucidus) and black-eared cuckoo (C. osculans) is rarely recorded.

=== Feeding ===
The white-winged fairywren is primarily insectivorous; its diet includes small beetles, bugs, moths, praying mantises, caterpillars, and smaller insects, as well as spiders. The larger insects are typically fed to nestlings by the breeding female and her helpers, including the breeding male. Adults and juveniles forage by hopping along the shrubland floor, and may supplement their diets with seeds and fruits of saltbush (Rhagodia), goosefoot (Chenopodium) and new shoots of samphire. During spring and summer, birds are active in bursts through the day and accompany their foraging with song. Insects are numerous and easy to catch, which allows the birds to rest between forays. The group often shelters and rests together during the heat of the day. Food is harder to find during winter and they are required to spend the day foraging continuously.

=== Threats ===
Adults and their young may be preyed upon by mammalian predators, such as the red fox (Vulpes vulpes) or the feral cat (Felis catus), and native predatory birds, such as the Australian magpie (Gymnorhina tibicen), butcherbird species (Cracticus spp.), laughing kookaburra (Dacelo novaeguineae), currawongs (Strepera spp.), crows and ravens (Corvus spp.), shrike-thrushes (Colluricincla spp.) and reptiles such as goannas. Another threat to the birds is from humans; many nests are trampled on (even by the occasional bird watcher) during breeding season because the nests are hidden close to the ground and therefore difficult for passers-by to spot.
