= Thomas Carter (ornithologist) =

English ornithologist (1863–1931)

Thomas Carter (1863–1931) was an English ornithologist active in Australia. He made large collections of bird specimens while living and working in remote regions of Western Australia.

== Biography ==
Born in the town of Masham in Yorkshire, England, to Amelia Mary Carter, née Rhodes on the 6 April 1863. His merchant father, James, is said to have shared an interest in wildlife.

Carter had published papers on British birds, and made observations in Iceland, before travelling to Western Australia. He arrived at Carnarvon to work at Boolathanna station, later acquiring a pastoral lease around Point Cloates. Carter married Annie Ward when back in England in 1903, and returned to settle at a Broomehill property. Illness reportedly required his family to return to England in 1914, living in Sutton, Surrey, but he returned to the region for several expeditions, the last in 1928.

Thomas Carter died in Yorkshire, 29 January 1931, and is buried there.

== Works ==
Tom Carter's arrival in Western Australia reopened ornithological study of the region's birds, following a period of few collections and little research. While working in his first job as a Jackaroo, Carter used his spare time to make observations and collect bird skins and eggs in the Gascoyne district. He later studied the North West Cape and Broomehill regions. He also made an expedition to Dirk Hartog Island in 1916, where he made the first observations of the Black-and-white Wren (a subspecies of the White-Winged Fairy-Wren) and the Western Grass-wren since their first collection one hundred years before. Carter made a collection of around five hundred bird skins from Western Australia, which he delivered to England in 1903 and was eventually included in the Tring Collection and at the American Museum of Natural History.

Carter made a significant contribution to the ornithological literature on Australian birds, his notes and papers from Western Australia appearing in The Zoologist and The Emu. In his article, 'Birds Occurring in the Region of the North-West Cape', (Emu, 1903.), Carter gives the names of birds in the Talaindji language.

Carter published 'Birds of the Broome Hill District', where he had lived for a decade, in the Emu in 1923–24.
