= Hitchcock (disambiguation) =

Alfred Hitchcock (1899–1980) was an English film director.

Hitchcock may also refer to:

== People ==
- Hitchcock (surname)

== Places ==
- Hitchcock, Indiana, United States
- Hitchcock, South Dakota, United States
- Hitchcock, Texas, United States
- Hitchcock, Oklahoma, United States
- Hitchcock County, Nebraska, United States
- Lake Hitchcock, a former glacially-formed lake of New England
- Snell-Hitchcock Halls, two connected residence halls at the University of Chicago

== Other uses ==
- Hitchcock: The First Forty-Four Films, a 1957 book by Éric Rohmer and Claude Chabrol
- Hitchcock (film), a 2012 film about filmmaker Alfred Hitchcock
- Michael Hitchcock (Brooklyn Nine-Nine), fictional character in the sitcom Brooklyn Nine-Nine
- Hitchcock (automobile), an American car manufactured in 1909
- Hitchcock (Japanese: ヒッチコック), a song by Japanese rock duo Yorushika, from the album A Loser Doesn't Need an Encore

== See also ==
- Hitchcockella
