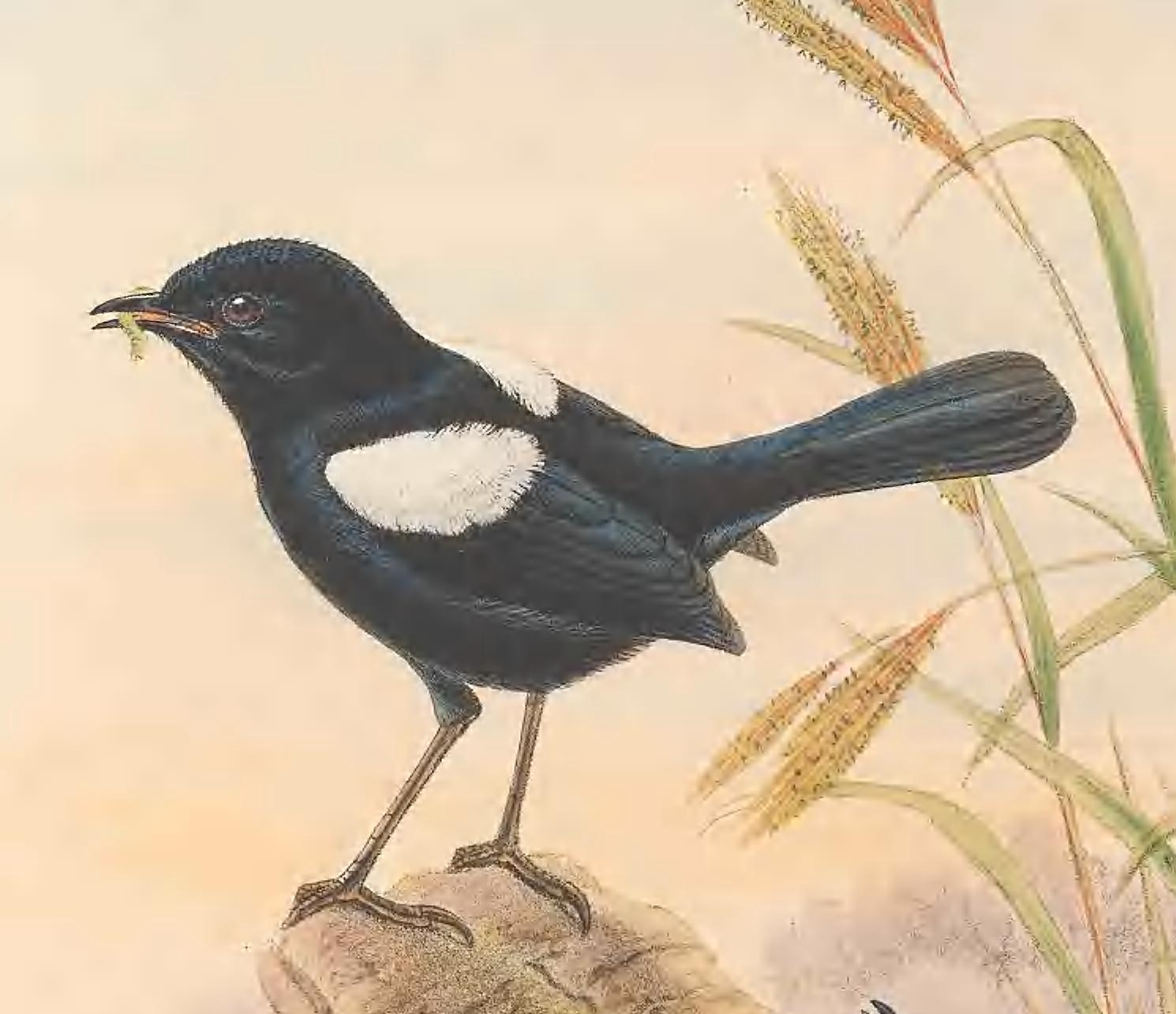

Conservation status
- Least Concern (IUCN 3.1)

Scientific classification
- Kingdom: Animalia
- Phylum: Chordata
- Class: Aves
- Order: Passeriformes
- Family: Maluridae
- Genus: Malurus
- Species: M. alboscapulatus

Binomial name
- Malurus alboscapulatus Meyer, 1874

= White-shouldered fairywren =

Species of bird

The white-shouldered fairywren (Malurus alboscapulatus) is a species of bird in the Australasian wren family, Maluridae. It is found in New Guinea.

== Taxonomy and systematics ==
The white-shouldered fairywren was first described by the German naturalist Adolf Bernhard Meyer in 1874. It is one of eleven species in the genus Malurus and is most closely related to a pair of Australian species, the red-backed and white-winged fairywrens, with which it makes up a phylogenetic clade. These three species were termed the bicoloured wrens by ornithologist Richard Schodde, and are notable for their lack of head patterns and ear tufts, and their uniform black or blue plumage with contrasting shoulder or wing colour. They replace each other geographically across northern Australia and New Guinea.

Its species name is derived from the Latin words albus "white" and scapulae "shoulder-blades". Alternative names for the white-shouldered fairywren include the black-and-white fairywren, black-and-white wren, black-and-white wren-warbler and white-shouldered wren.

=== Subspecies ===
Six geographically isolated subspecies are currently recognised. They are differentiated by the differences in female plumage as the males of all six are indistinguishable.

- M. a. alboscapulatus – Meyer, 1874: The nominate subspecies, it is found on Bird's Head Peninsula (north-western New Guinea)
- M. a. aida – Hartert, 1930: Found in north-western and north-central New Guinea
- M. a. lorentzi – van Oort, 1909: Originally described as a separate species. Found in western and southern New Guinea
- M. a. kutubu – Schodde & Hitchcock, 1968: Found in the highlands of south-central New Guinea
- M. a. moretoni – De Vis, 1892: Originally described as a separate species. Found in south-eastern New Guinea
- M. a. naimii – d'Albertis, 1875: Originally described as a separate species. Found in eastern New Guinea

== Description ==
The adult male is all shiny black except for their white shoulders (scapulars), but unlike the better-known Australian fairywrens there is no eclipse male plumage. The tail is shorter than that of other fairywrens. The bill is black, and the feet and eyes are black or dark brown. The females of M. a. alboscapulatus and M. a. naimii bear a pied plumage, with black upperparts contrasting with white shoulders and underparts.

== Distribution and habitat ==
The preferred habitats of the white-shouldered fairywren are lowland cleared areas; grassland, village gardens, and cane-grass.

== Behavior ==
=== Breeding ===
The white-shouldered fairywren breeds throughout the year, with seasonal peaks from November to March. A clutch is composed of 2–3 eggs, which are cream-coloured and speckled reddish at one end. A second clutch is uncommon. Nestlings mainly fed on Orthopterans and caterpillars brought by the parents.
