= Wagon Bed Spring =

Spring in Kansas, U.S.

- Lower Cimarron Spring
- U.S. National Register of Historic Places
- U.S. National Historic Landmark
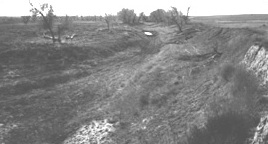
- View of the spring site

- Location within Kansas Location within the United States
- Nearest city: Ulysses, Kansas
- Coordinates: 37°23′54″N 101°22′15″W
- Area: 195 acres (79 ha) (after 1998 enlargement)
- Built: 1820
- NRHP reference No.: 66000344

Significant dates
- Added to NRHP: October 15, 1966
- Boundary increase: August 5, 1998
- Designated NHL: December 19, 1960

Wagon Bed Spring, also known historically as the Lower Spring or Lower Cimarron Spring, is a historic former spring in Grant County, Kansas, United States. It is located about 12 miles (19 km) south of Ulysses, on the west side of K-25 (Kansas highway). In the 19th century it was an important watering spot on the Cimarron Cutoff of the Santa Fe Trail, where migrants on the trail often camped. The spring is now dry, primarily due to irrigation lowering the water table in the area. It was declared a National Historic Landmark in 1961.

== Description ==
Wagon Bed Spring is located at what was historically the north bank of the Cimarron River, in a rural setting about 12 miles (19 km) south of Ulysses, Kansas. The site is marked by interpretive signage. The river is a historically intermittent stream, and its channel has been altered since the 19th century by flooding, and the actual spring site is now in the river bed. The flow of the spring came from an outcropping of the Ogallala Formation. Center pivot irrigation adjacent to the spring resulted in lowering of the water table and the spring ceased to flow in the 1960s.

The site is historically and archaeologically significant as a major migrant camp site on the Santa Fe Trail. The spring was one of the few reliable sources of water along the Cimarron Cutoff between the watersheds of the Arkansas and Cimarron Rivers, and many migrant and military groups camped here in the 60 years or so that the trail was used. Mountain man Jedediah Smith was probably killed here or near here on May 27, 1831, by Comanches.

The Daughters of the American Revolution placed a historic marker near the spring in 1907. In 1914, a series of floods on the Cimarron River began to significantly alter the topography of the area, eventually placing the location within a much widened river bed. The site was designated a National Historic Landmark in 1960, but its boundaries were not precisely delineated. It had also not been investigated archaeologically to any significant degree, although numerous accounts give descriptions of the site over time. Amateur investigations in the 1980s suggested that major elements of the site, in particular the places where migrant groups camped, fell outside the assumed boundaries of the site. The National Park Service instituted formal investigations in the early 1990s resulted in a formal characterization of the spring area, and identification of the core areas used for camping. The landmarked area also includes sections of preserved wagon ruts.

== See also ==
- List of National Historic Landmarks in Kansas
- National Register of Historic Places listings in Grant County, Kansas
