= Hickok, Kansas =

Unincorporated community in Grant County, Kansas

Coordinates: 37°33′40″N 101°13′44″W

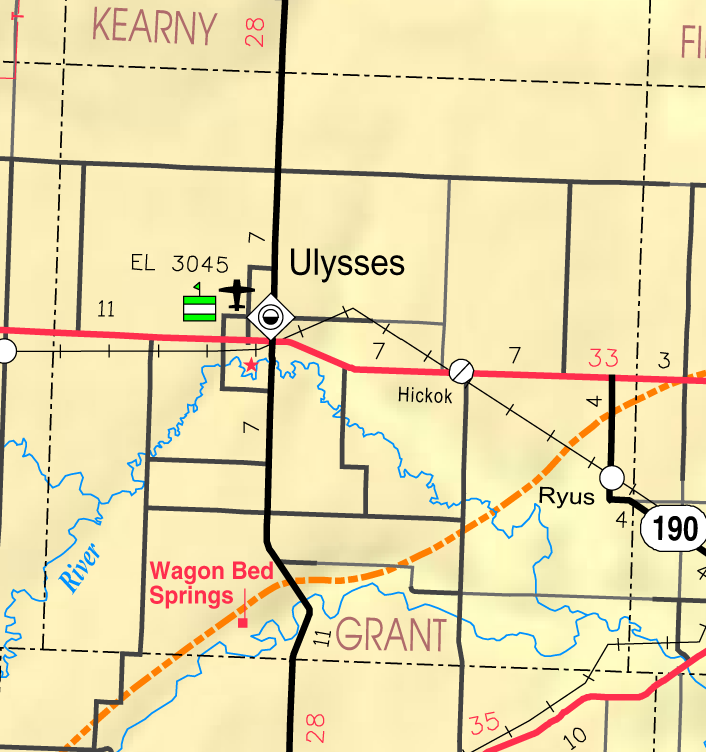
Map of Grant County from KDOT (map legend)

Hickok is an unincorporated community in Grant County, Kansas, United States. It lies in eastern Lincoln Township along U.S. Route 160, 7 miles (11 km) east of the county seat of Ulysses.
