= Alan Hitchcox =

Australian cricketer (born 1938)

Personal information
- Full name: Robert Alan Hitchcox
- Born: 14 May 1938 (age 88); North Adelaide, South Australia, Australia
- Batting: Right-handed
- Bowling: Right-arm fast-medium

Domestic team information
- Years: Team
- 1958–59 to 1959–60: South Australia

Career statistics
| Competition | First-class |
|---|---|
| Matches | 11 |
| Runs scored | 148 |
| Batting average | 11.38 |
| 100s/50s | 0/1 |
| Top score | 63 |
| Balls bowled | 2,544 |
| Wickets | 37 |
| Bowling average | 29.43 |
| 5 wickets in innings | 2 |
| 10 wickets in match | 0 |
| Best bowling | 6/71 |
| Catches/stumpings | 7/0 |
- Source: Cricinfo, 17 April 2025

Robert Alan Hitchcox (born 14 May 1938) is a former Australian cricketer. He played in eleven first-class matches for South Australia between 1958 and 1960.

A right-arm fast-medium bowler, Hitchcox's best first-class bowling figures were 6 for 71 for South Australia against Queensland in the 1958–59 Sheffield Shield.

Hitchcox was one of several Australian bowlers at the time whose actions were widely considered to be suspect, although he was never no-balled for throwing. He tried to amend his action to make it more acceptable, but lost form as a consequence. He continued to play in the Adelaide competition, but retired in the mid-1960s after continued unfavourable reports on his action from rival captains.

Hitchcox worked for 25 years in the composing room of the Adelaide Advertiser before moving to Victor Harbor in the 1980s to work on the local paper, the Times.
