= Hitchcock (automobile) =

Defunct American motor vehicle manufacturer

The Hitchcock was an American automobile built in 1909 by the Hitchcock Motor Car Company in Warren, Michigan. The Hitchcock was a small car powered by a two-cylinder, two-stroke Speedwell engine of 20 hp. Very few Hitchcock models were produced.
