= Justice Hitchcock =

Justice Hitchcock may refer to:

- Henry Hitchcock (1792–1839), chief justice of the Alabama Supreme Court
- Peter Hitchcock (1781–1853), associate justice and chief justice of the Supreme Court of Ohio
