= Grant County, Kansas =

County in Kansas, United States

- County
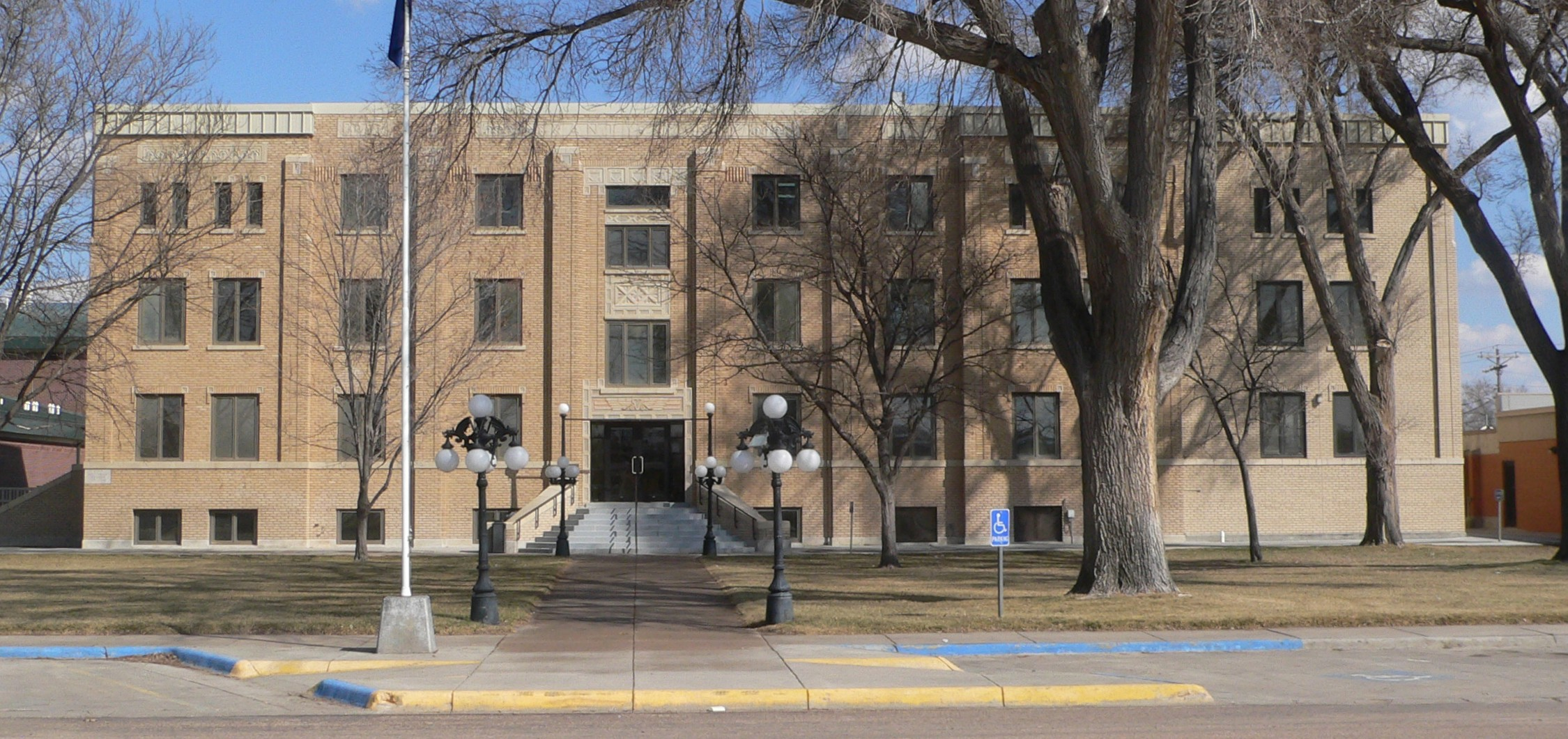
- Grant County Courthouse in Ulysses (2015)

- Location within the U.S. state of Kansas
- Coordinates: 37°35′00″N 101°19′59″W
- Country: United States
- State: Kansas
- Founded: March 20, 1873
- Named for: Ulysses S. Grant
- Seat: Ulysses
- Largest city: Ulysses

Area
  - Total: 575 sq mi (1,490 km^{2})
  - Land: 575 sq mi (1,490 km^{2})
  - Water: 0.3 sq mi (0.78 km^{2}) 0.06%

Population (2020)
  - Total: 7,352
  - Estimate (2025): 7,028 ▼
  - Density: 12.8/sq mi (4.9/km^{2})
- Time zone: UTC−6 (Central)
  - Summer (DST): UTC−5 (CDT)
- Congressional district: 1st
- Website: grantcoks.org

Grant County is a county located in the U.S. state of Kansas. Its county seat and only city is Ulysses. As of the 2020 census, the county population was 7,352. Both the county and its seat are named after Ulysses Grant, the 18th President of the United States.

== History ==
In 1873, the part of Kansas west of Range 25 was divided into 25 new counties. The new counties were Decatur, Rawlins, Cheyenne, Sheridan, Thomas, Sherman, Lane, Buffalo, Foote, Meade, Scott, Sequoyah, Arapahoe, Seward, Wichita, Kearny, Greeley, Hamilton, Stanton, Kansas, Stevens, and Grant.

Grant County, Kansas was named after Ulysses S. Grant, the 18th President of the United States (1869–1877), and incumbent president at the time of the county's formation. The initial survey establishing county boundaries was in the summer of 1874.

In 1883, Kearny, Sequoyah, Arapahoe, Kansas, Stevens, Stanton, Meade, Clark and Grant counties disappeared. Hamilton, Ford, Seward, and Hodgeman counties enlarged and Finney County was created. Grant County was split with the western portion becoming a part of Hamilton County and the eastern portion becoming a part of the newly created Finney County.

On June 9, 1888, Grant County was again established as a Kansas county, with original county boundaries, with the first officers of the new Grant County being sworn in on June 18, 1888.

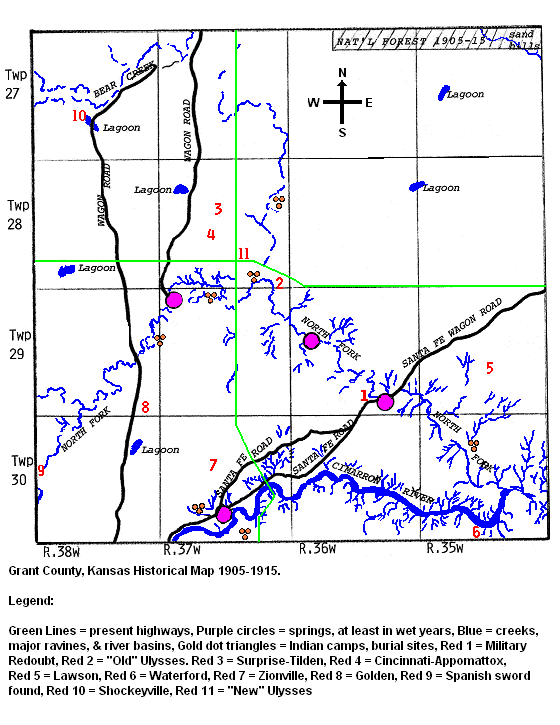
Legend: Green Lines = present highways, Purple circles = springs, at least in wet years, Blue = creeks, major ravines, & river basins, Gold dot triangles = Indian camps, burial sites, Red 1 = Military Redoubt, Red 2 = "Old" Ulysses. Red 3 = Surprise-Tilden, Red 4 = Cincinnati-Appomattox, Red 5 = Lawson, Red 6 = Waterford, Red 7 = Zionville, Red 8 = Golden, Red 9 = Spanish sword found, Red 10 = Shockeyville, Red 11 = "New" Ulysses

In October 1888, the county seat election for Grant County resulted in victory for Ulysses, Kansas, election results were:.

| Town Name | Vote count |
|---|---|
| Ulysses | 578 |
| Appomattox | 268 |
| Shockeyville | 41 |
| Golswn | 31 |
| Spurgeon | 2 |

In the 1930s, the prosperity of the area was severely affected by its location within the Dust Bowl. This catastrophe intensified the economic impact of the Great Depression in the region.

=== Early Day Settlements ===
- "Old" Ulysses, subsequently moved to New Ulysses in 1909
- Surprise-Tilden
- Cincinnati-Appomattox
- Shockey (Shockeyville)
- Golden
- Zionville
- Lawson
- Waterford
- Gognac
- Spurgeon

== Geography ==
According to the U.S. Census Bureau, the county has a total area of 575 square miles (1,490 km^{2}), of which 575 square miles (1,490 km^{2}) is land and 0.3 square miles (0.78 km^{2}) (0.06%) is water.

=== Major highways ===
- U.S. Highway 160
- Kansas Highway 25

=== Adjacent counties ===
- Kearny County (north)
- Finney County (northeast)
- Haskell County (east)
- Stevens County (south)
- Stanton County (west)
- Hamilton County (northwest)

== Demographics ==
Historical population
| Census | Pop. | Note | %± |
|---|---|---|---|
| 1890 | 1,308 | | — |
| 1900 | 422 | | −67.7% |
| 1910 | 1,087 | | 157.6% |
| 1920 | 1,087 | | 0.0% |
| 1930 | 3,092 | | 184.5% |
| 1940 | 1,946 | | −37.1% |
| 1950 | 4,638 | | 138.3% |
| 1960 | 5,269 | | 13.6% |
| 1970 | 5,961 | | 13.1% |
| 1980 | 6,977 | | 17.0% |
| 1990 | 7,159 | | 2.6% |
| 2000 | 7,909 | | 10.5% |
| 2010 | 7,829 | | −1.0% |
| 2020 | 7,352 | | −6.1% |
| 2025 (est.) | 7,028 | ▼ | −4.4% |
U.S. Decennial Census; 1790-1960 1900-1990; 1990-2000 2010-2020

=== 2020 census ===
As of the 2020 census, the county had a population of 7,352. The median age was 34.1 years; 29.9% of residents were under the age of 18 and 14.0% were 65 years of age or older. For every 100 females there were 101.1 males, and for every 100 females age 18 and over there were 99.4 males age 18 and over.

79.8% of residents lived in urban areas, while 20.2% lived in rural areas.

The racial makeup of the county was 57.4% White, 0.1% Black or African American, 2.2% American Indian and Alaska Native, 0.2% Asian, 0.1% Native Hawaiian and Pacific Islander, 20.5% from some other race, and 19.4% from two or more races. Hispanic or Latino residents of any race comprised 52.5% of the population.

There were 2,621 households in the county, of which 39.8% had children under the age of 18 living with them and 22.3% had a female householder with no spouse or partner present. About 23.6% of all households were made up of individuals and 9.8% had someone living alone who was 65 years of age or older.

There were 2,930 housing units, of which 10.5% were vacant. Among occupied housing units, 72.1% were owner-occupied and 27.9% were renter-occupied. The homeowner vacancy rate was 1.9% and the rental vacancy rate was 8.6%.

=== 2000 census ===
As of the 2000 census, there were 7,909 people, 2,742 households, and 2,097 families residing in the county. The population density was 14 people per square mile (5.4 people/km^{2}). There were 3,027 housing units at an average density of 5 per square mile (1.9/km^{2}). The racial makeup of the county was 77.00% White, 0.86% Native American, 0.37% Asian, 0.21% Black or African American, 19.46% from other races, and 2.10% from two or more races. Hispanic or Latino of any race were 34.67% of the population.

There were 2,742 households, out of which 43.60% had children under the age of 18 living with them, 66.40% were married couples living together, 7.10% had a female householder with no husband present, and 23.50% were non-families. 21.00% of all households were made up of individuals, and 8.20% had someone living alone who was 65 years of age or older. The average household size was 2.86 and the average family size was 3.34.

In the county, the population was spread out, with 32.80% under the age of 18, 8.70% from 18 to 24, 28.70% from 25 to 44, 20.20% from 45 to 64, and 9.60% who were 65 years of age or older. The median age was 31 years. For every 100 females there were 100.70 males. For every 100 females age 18 and over, there were 97.50 males.

The median income for a household in the county was $39,854, and the median income for a family was $44,914. Males had a median income of $34,464 versus $22,000 for females. The per capita income for the county was $17,072. About 6.50% of families and 10.10% of the population were below the poverty line, including 13.60% of those under age 18 and 7.50% of those age 65 or over.

== Government ==
=== Presidential elections ===
Grant County, in common with the rest of rural Kansas, votes predominantly Republican at the presidential level. In 1964, Lyndon B. Johnson was the last Democrat to win the county, and Jimmy Carter narrowly lost the county in 1976. Michael Dukakis (as of 2024) is the last Democrat to win more than a quarter of the county's vote.

Presidential election results

United States presidential election results for Grant County, Kansas
| Year | Republican | | Democratic | | Third party(ies) | |
| Year | No. | % | No. | % | No. | % |
|---|---|---|---|---|---|---|
| 1888 | 390 | 50.45% | 245 | 31.69% | 138 | 17.85% |
| 1892 | 151 | 53.55% | 0 | 0.00% | 131 | 46.45% |
| 1896 | 51 | 45.95% | 60 | 54.05% | 0 | 0.00% |
| 1900 | 58 | 51.79% | 53 | 47.32% | 1 | 0.89% |
| 1904 | 81 | 65.85% | 35 | 28.46% | 7 | 5.69% |
| 1908 | 178 | 54.77% | 133 | 40.92% | 14 | 4.31% |
| 1912 | 56 | 20.82% | 80 | 29.74% | 133 | 49.44% |
| 1916 | 200 | 44.54% | 208 | 46.33% | 41 | 9.13% |
| 1920 | 339 | 73.70% | 108 | 23.48% | 13 | 2.83% |
| 1924 | 459 | 67.11% | 148 | 21.64% | 77 | 11.26% |
| 1928 | 635 | 76.41% | 185 | 22.26% | 11 | 1.32% |
| 1932 | 395 | 33.70% | 737 | 62.88% | 40 | 3.41% |
| 1936 | 476 | 43.59% | 616 | 56.41% | 0 | 0.00% |
| 1940 | 614 | 61.03% | 382 | 37.97% | 10 | 0.99% |
| 1944 | 566 | 66.35% | 282 | 33.06% | 5 | 0.59% |
| 1948 | 742 | 53.34% | 625 | 44.93% | 24 | 1.73% |
| 1952 | 1,277 | 71.02% | 502 | 27.92% | 19 | 1.06% |
| 1956 | 1,058 | 69.47% | 459 | 30.14% | 6 | 0.39% |
| 1960 | 1,235 | 63.59% | 702 | 36.15% | 5 | 0.26% |
| 1964 | 727 | 40.96% | 1,023 | 57.63% | 25 | 1.41% |
| 1968 | 1,121 | 57.16% | 618 | 31.51% | 222 | 11.32% |
| 1972 | 1,469 | 73.19% | 476 | 23.72% | 62 | 3.09% |
| 1976 | 1,226 | 50.62% | 1,151 | 47.52% | 45 | 1.86% |
| 1980 | 1,711 | 66.01% | 683 | 26.35% | 198 | 7.64% |
| 1984 | 2,043 | 76.26% | 615 | 22.96% | 21 | 0.78% |
| 1988 | 1,654 | 63.69% | 907 | 34.92% | 36 | 1.39% |
| 1992 | 1,561 | 51.71% | 619 | 20.50% | 839 | 27.79% |
| 1996 | 1,772 | 66.52% | 633 | 23.76% | 259 | 9.72% |
| 2000 | 2,126 | 74.44% | 683 | 23.91% | 47 | 1.65% |
| 2004 | 2,169 | 78.64% | 561 | 20.34% | 28 | 1.02% |
| 2008 | 1,995 | 74.97% | 635 | 23.86% | 31 | 1.16% |
| 2012 | 1,811 | 78.53% | 456 | 19.77% | 39 | 1.69% |
| 2016 | 1,804 | 75.51% | 441 | 18.46% | 144 | 6.03% |
| 2020 | 1,936 | 77.41% | 518 | 20.71% | 47 | 1.88% |
| 2024 | 1,793 | 80.77% | 395 | 17.79% | 32 | 1.44% |

=== Laws ===
Grant County was a prohibition, or "dry", county until the Kansas Constitution was amended in 1986 and voters approved the sale of alcoholic liquor by the individual drink with a 30% food sales requirement.

== Education ==
=== Unified school districts ===
- Ulysses USD 214

== Communities ==
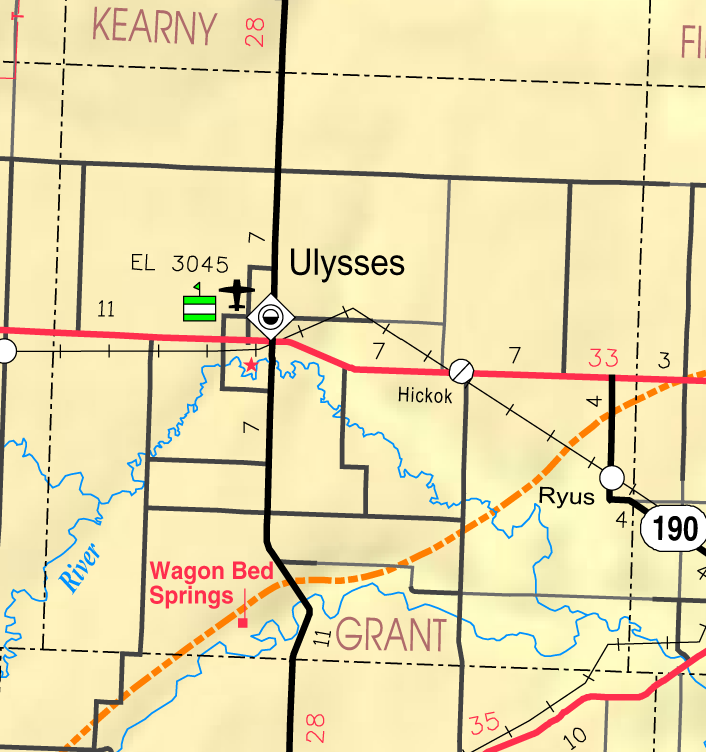
2005 map of Grant County (map legend)

List of current townships / incorporated cities / unincorporated communities / extinct former communities within Grant County.

=== City ===
- Ulysses (county seat)

=== Unincorporated communities ===
- Hickok
- Ryus
- Stano
- Sullivans Tracks

=== Townships ===
Area affected by 1930s Dust Bowl

Grant County is divided into three townships. None of the cities within the county are considered governmentally independent, and all figures for the townships include those of the cities. In the following table, the population center is the largest city (or cities) included in that township's population total, if it is of a significant size.

| Township | FIPS | Population center | Population | Population density /km^{2} (/sq mi) | Land area km^{2} (sq mi) | Water area km^{2} (sq mi) | Water % | Geographic coordinates |
|---|---|---|---|---|---|---|---|---|
| Lincoln | 40725 | Ulysses | 7,058 | 19 (49) | 372 (144) | 0 (0) | 0.10% | 37°34′26″N 101°20′30″W |
| Sherman | 64975 | | 498 | 1 (2) | 559 (216) | 0 (0) | 0.01% | 37°39′23″N 101°17′59″W |
| Sullivan | 68875 | | 353 | 1 (2) | 558 (215) | 0 (0) | 0.01% | 37°28′12″N 101°18′11″W |
Sources: "Census 2000 U.S. Gazetteer Files". U.S. Census Bureau, Geography Division. Archived from the original on August 2, 2002.

== See also ==
- Dry counties

Community information for Kansas

- Kansas locations by per capita income
- List of counties in Kansas
- List of townships in Kansas
- List of cities in Kansas
- List of unincorporated communities in Kansas
- List of ghost towns in Kansas
