= Warren Billingsley Hitchcock =

Australian field biologist (1919–1984)

Warren Billingsley Hitchcock (18 December 1919 – 16 March 1984) was an Australian field biologist and ornithologist. He was born at Ashfield, New South Wales and educated in Adelaide, South Australia. During the Second World War he served in the CMF and AIF in the Northern Territory of Australia as well as in New Guinea and New Britain.

Subsequently, he worked for various Australian state museums and for the Northern Territory Administration when, in 1955, he was badly burned from the waist down in a vehicle accident that resulted in a permanent disability. Following two years of hospitalisation and convalescence he worked for the CSIRO Wildlife Survey Section as secretary of the Australian Bird Banding Scheme and as curator of the CSIRO's ornithological collections before retiring in 1970 for health reasons. In 1978, he went to New Zealand and enrolled in the Department of Anthropology at the University of Auckland though, because of ill-health, he was not able to graduate. He died in Auckland of congestive heart failure while he slept.

He joined the Royal Australasian Ornithologists Union in 1938 and served it as Secretary 1951–1952, President 1962–1963, and as Editor of the Emu 1962–1965. He was a founder of the Canberra Ornithologists Group in 1964.
