= Norman Joseph Favaloro =

Australian lawyer, ornithologist, and zoologist

Norman Joseph Favaloro (15 August 1905 – 25 October 1989) was an Australian lawyer and amateur ornithologist and zoologist. Norman was born in Bendigo. He practiced law in Mildura, Victoria where he lived most of his life. In 1940 he was appointed an Honorary Associate in the Ornithology Department of the National Museum of Victoria, an association he retained the rest of his life. He made three trips to the subantarctic, visiting Macquarie Island, Heard Island and Kerguelen Island. At Macquarie Island he collected king penguins and their eggs for the National Museum of Victoria. His own notable egg collection was also bequeathed to the Museum.

He joined the Royal Australasian Ornithologists Union (RAOU) in 1923 at the age of eighteen, and served the organisation as President 1952–1954, and Treasurer 1965–1968.
