= Ulysses, Kansas =

City in Grant County, Kansas

- City and County seat
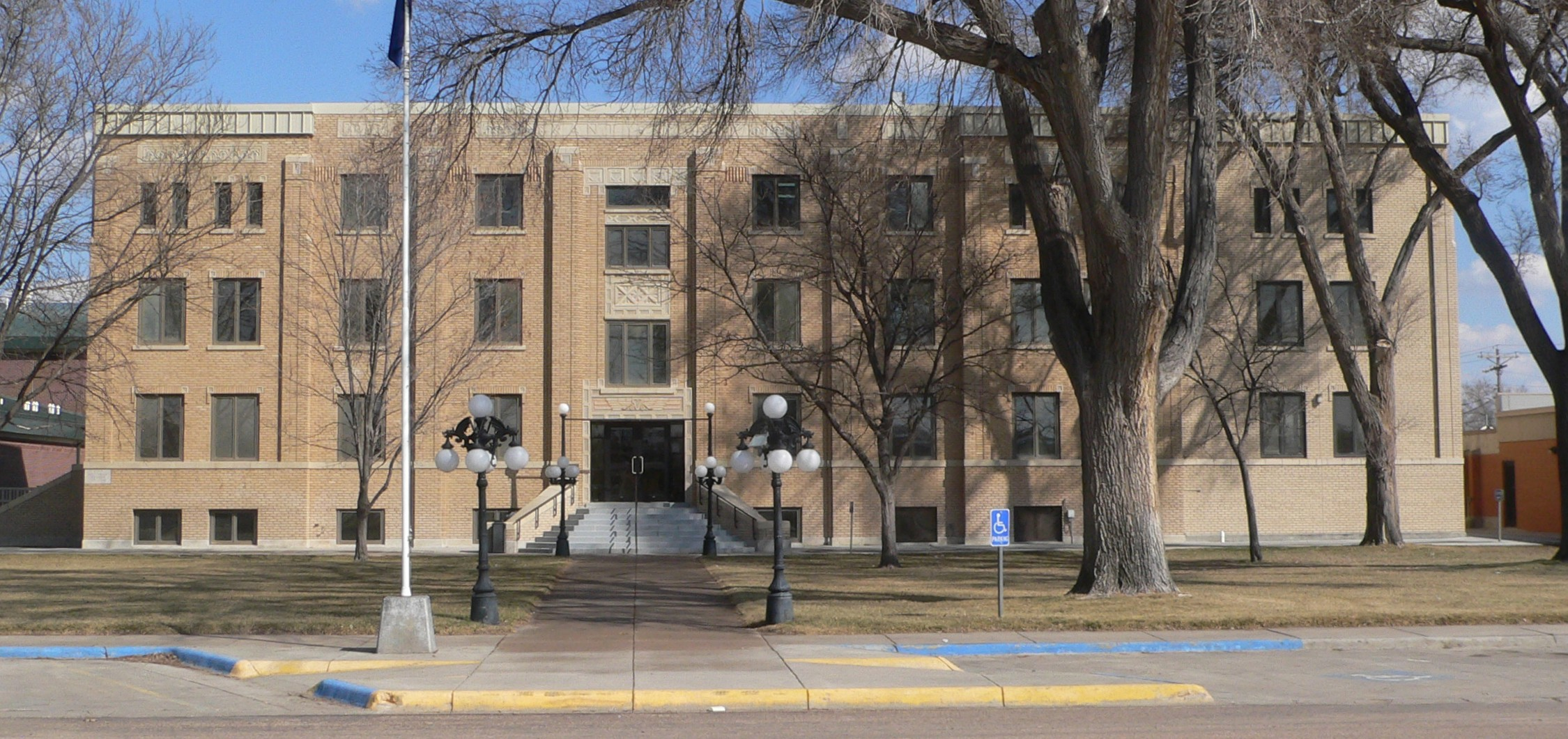
- Grant County courthouse (2015)

- Location within Grant County and Kansas

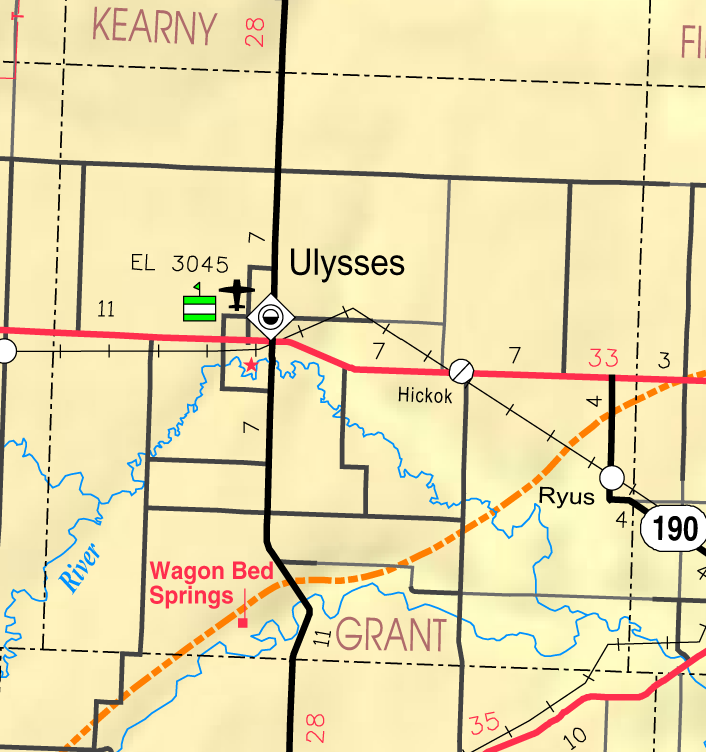
- KDOT map of Grant County (legend)
- Coordinates: 37°34′48″N 101°21′27″W
- Country: United States
- State: Kansas
- County: Grant
- Founded: 1885
- Incorporated: 1921
- Named for: Ulysses S. Grant

Area
  - Total: 3.30 sq mi (8.54 km^{2})
  - Land: 3.23 sq mi (8.36 km^{2})
  - Water: 0.069 sq mi (0.18 km^{2})
- Elevation: 3,055 ft (931 m)

Population (2020)
  - Total: 5,788
  - Density: 1,790/sq mi (692/km^{2})
- Time zone: UTC-6 (CST)
  - Summer (DST): UTC-5 (CDT)
- ZIP Code: 67880
- Area code: 620
- FIPS code: 20-71975
- GNIS ID: 471718
- Website: cityofulysses.com

Ulysses (pronounced /juːˈlɪsɪs/) is a city in and the county seat of Grant County, Kansas, United States. The city and county are both named after Ulysses S. Grant, the 18th President of the United States. As of the 2020 census, the population of the city was 5,788.

== History ==
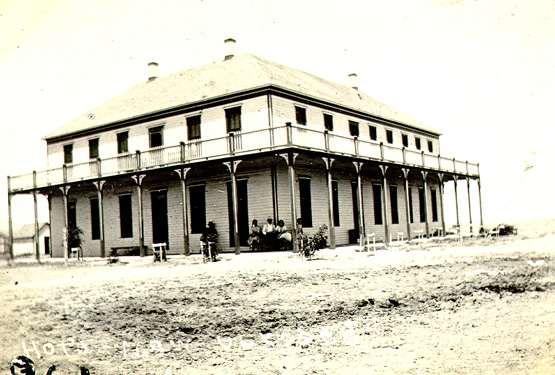
Hotel Edwards, in New Ulysses, after town was moved in 1909

=== Early history ===
In 1831, south of the future site of Ulysses, Kansas, then a part of Northern Mexico Territory, mountain man and explorer Jedediah Smith was killed by Comanche warriors, on May 27, 1831. The first Ulysses, town, founded in June 1885, was located approximately two miles east of present-day Ulysses. Approximately six weeks later Ulysses' first newspaper, the Grant County Register, began publication.

From February 1892 through August 1893, Ulysses had two weekly newspapers, the Ulysses Tribune and the Grant County Republican; both papers were political in nature. The Grant County Republican represented the Republican Party, and the Ulysses Tribune represented the Alliance Party. The Grant County Republican constitutes the predecessor of the current-day Ulysses News, which claims to be Grant County's oldest surviving business, although it has operated under numerous names, editor/publishers, and management.

In the Grant County Register, Volume 1, #1, dated July 21, 1885, the following story was published:

Ulysses, everything is newness and bustle, when a month ago on the 7th of June six thousand head of cattle were rounded up on a gentle western slope near a beautiful lake. Now there is a bustling, prosperous young city, and all the country is dotted with settlements. The town company offers fine inducements to all wanting to embark in business, no better location can be found. We have several buildings already up, and a good hotel with 16 rooms.

Another publication, the Ulysses Tribune, published in March 1887:

Ulysses is the booming town of old Grant County, Kansas. The old county lines will be established by the present legislature beyond doubt, and Ulysses is bound to be the county seat. Ulysses has more natural advantages than any other town in western Kansas. She is on the direct line of the new east and west railroad, and a railroad is to be built from Lakin south to Ulysses, thus insuring her of two railroads. In other towns water is to be found at a depth of one to three hundred feet, but in Ulysses pure water is found at 30 feet.

In its prime, "Old" Ulysses boasted four hotels (the most notable, Hotel Edwards, pictured herein, which was moved to "New Ulysses" in 1909, and has been preserved/restored, currently resting on the grounds of The Historic Adobe Museum for Grant County, Kansas today), twelve restaurants, twelve saloons, a bank, six gambling houses, a large schoolhouse, a church, a newspaper office, and an opera house to serve the approximately 1500 residents. When Old Ulysses moved to New Ulysses in 1909, the opera house was set in what is today the front lawn of the current day court house, where it was converted into being the Grant County courthouse, with county offices on the first floor, and high school classes being held on the second floor, until the first dedicated building for a high school was put in service in 1923. During the 1930s WPA era, the current Grant County courthouse was constructed behind it, and this building was destroyed.

According to the Grant County Register, in February 1888, the Supreme Court of Kansas declared Ulysses the temporary county seat of Grant County. The county seat status was contested by another early Grant County settlement, Cincinnati, throwing the determination into state courts. During this same general time frame of 1887–1888, Grant County itself was in a state of formation, de-formation, ultimate re-formation and re-organization, with that controversy being resolved and the first officers of Grant County being sworn on June 18, 1888.

The years 1885 through 1888 and the first half of 1889, were boom times and growing years for early day Ulysses; the second half of 1889 brought drought, and the boom began to fade.

=== Early 1900s ===
By the early 1900s, Ulysses was the last surviving town in Grant County, and by 1906, Ulysses was faced with increasingly hard times and desperation. According to the Grant County History book, the population of Ulysses had dwindled from that of a flourishing town to a hamlet of about 40 people.

24 years later, after the initial founding, in February 1909, the early day residents of "Old" Ulysses began moving the remains of the town to its present location.

The early town of Ulysses had been bonded heavily for improvements that were never made. The bonds were issued and sold and the money pocketed by early grafters. "Old" Ulysses dwindled from a flourishing town of approximately 1,500 residents in the late 1880s to a hamlet of 100 in 1908. Facing a staggering debt of $84,000 (US$ 3,010,000 in 2025), for which there was absolutely nothing to show, the situation was desperate.

Some of the bond holders brought suit and took judgments for several thousand dollars against the city for delinquent interest. The citizens of Ulysses were forced to pay a high levy to meet payment on the judgment. This levy included a 600% increase in the realty taxes, and a 362% increase on personal property taxes.

After paying taxes for one year, residents of Ulysses decided to move off the old town site, out of the school district. The unity the citizens displayed in this decision has been noted in Ulysses and Grant County history.

The city fathers moved approximately two miles west, and purchased a quarter of land that was deeded to the New Ulysses Town Company. After the land was surveyed into a new town site, the town began the move. The move began the first of February 1909, and continued for approximately three months. Skids were used to move the larger buildings, and the smaller ones were loaded onto wagons. Horse power was used to move the loads. It was necessary to move these structures downhill, through a large draw, and uphill to the new locations.

It took several days to move some of the buildings. The larger buildings were cut into sections and moved a section at a time. It took 60 horses to move just one section of the old hotel. The courthouse and the post office remained on the old town site until June 1909, when New Ulysses was officially declared the county seat.

The move that began in February was completed in June 1909, when every resident with their homes, business houses and belongings moved from the old town site. The inhabitants moved to the new location, two and one half miles west, crossing the Lakin draw at the bottom of an intervening valley, and built a new town called New Ulysses. Later in 1909, with the move complete, the former citizens left the old town site just as they had found it, a rolling tract of prairie.

=== Proposed secession ===
On September 11, 1992, Ulysses was chosen as the capital of the proposed state of "West Kansas" and hosted the states constitutional convention. The proclamation of the state was a protest due to Governor Joan Finney both increasing rural taxation and decreasing rural school funding. No formal petition for secession was ever presented to the Kansas Legislature and the movement died out rather quickly.

== Geography ==
Ulysses is located at 37°34′48″N 101°21′27″W (37.580055, -101.357532). According to the United States Census Bureau, the city has a total area of 3.26 square miles (8.44 km^{2}), of which 3.18 square miles (8.24 km^{2}) is land and 0.08 square miles (0.21 km^{2}) is water.

=== Climate ===
According to the Köppen Climate Classification system, Ulysses has a cold semi-arid climate, abbreviated "BSk" on climate maps. The hottest temperature recorded in Ulysses was 116 °F (46.7 °C) on July 28, 1894, while the coldest temperature recorded was −27 °F (−32.8 °C) on January 19, 1984.

Climate data for Ulysses, Kansas, 1991–2020 normals, extremes 1893–present
Month	Jan	Feb	Mar	Apr	May	Jun	Jul	Aug	Sep	Oct	Nov	Dec	Year
Record high °F (°C)	83 (28)	90 (32)	98 (37)	103 (39)	103 (39)	111 (44)	116 (47)	109 (43)	107 (42)	100 (38)	91 (33)	86 (30)	116 (47)
Mean maximum °F (°C)	68.7 (20.4)	75.9 (24.4)	83.8 (28.8)	90.1 (32.3)	96.0 (35.6)	101.9 (38.8)	103.8 (39.9)	100.9 (38.3)	98.6 (37.0)	92.5 (33.6)	79.5 (26.4)	68.4 (20.2)	105.0 (40.6)
Mean daily maximum °F (°C)	45.6 (7.6)	49.8 (9.9)	59.7 (15.4)	68.2 (20.1)	78.2 (25.7)	88.6 (31.4)	92.8 (33.8)	90.4 (32.4)	83.5 (28.6)	70.8 (21.6)	57.2 (14.0)	46.5 (8.1)	69.3 (20.7)
Daily mean °F (°C)	30.9 (−0.6)	34.6 (1.4)	43.4 (6.3)	52.1 (11.2)	62.6 (17.0)	73.6 (23.1)	78.1 (25.6)	76.1 (24.5)	68.2 (20.1)	54.7 (12.6)	41.7 (5.4)	32.0 (0.0)	54.0 (12.2)
Mean daily minimum °F (°C)	16.2 (−8.8)	19.3 (−7.1)	27.1 (−2.7)	36.0 (2.2)	47.0 (8.3)	58.6 (14.8)	63.4 (17.4)	61.8 (16.6)	52.9 (11.6)	38.7 (3.7)	26.2 (−3.2)	17.5 (−8.1)	38.7 (3.7)
Mean minimum °F (°C)	−0.3 (−17.9)	4.2 (−15.4)	11.4 (−11.4)	23.1 (−4.9)	33.6 (0.9)	46.8 (8.2)	55.4 (13.0)	53.8 (12.1)	38.9 (3.8)	24.1 (−4.4)	10.3 (−12.1)	0.2 (−17.7)	−6.2 (−21.2)
Record low °F (°C)	−27 (−33)	−20 (−29)	−18 (−28)	8 (−13)	19 (−7)	32 (0)	43 (6)	40 (4)	25 (−4)	3 (−16)	−9 (−23)	−21 (−29)	−27 (−33)
Average precipitation inches (mm)	0.43 (11)	0.32 (8.1)	1.08 (27)	1.51 (38)	1.96 (50)	2.59 (66)	2.88 (73)	2.87 (73)	1.34 (34)	1.60 (41)	0.49 (12)	0.69 (18)	17.76 (451.1)
Average snowfall inches (cm)	4.2 (11)	3.1 (7.9)	3.8 (9.7)	1.4 (3.6)	0.1 (0.25)	0.0 (0.0)	0.0 (0.0)	0.0 (0.0)	0.0 (0.0)	0.1 (0.25)	1.3 (3.3)	3.8 (9.7)	17.8 (45.7)
Average precipitation days (≥ 0.01 in)	2.8	3.2	4.4	5.7	7.2	7.7	8.3	7.7	4.7	4.3	3.1	3.1	62.2
Average snowy days (≥ 0.1 in)	2.2	2.3	1.5	0.4	0.1	0.0	0.0	0.0	0.0	0.2	0.9	2.2	9.8
Source 1: NOAA
Source 2: National Weather Service

== Demographics ==
Historical population
Census	Pop.	Note	%±
1890	198		—
1920	103		—
1930	1,140		1,006.8%
1940	824		−27.7%
1950	2,243		172.2%
1960	3,157		40.7%
1970	3,779		19.7%
1980	4,653		23.1%
1990	5,474		17.6%
2000	5,960		8.9%
2010	6,161		3.4%
2020	5,788		−6.1%
2023 (est.)	5,616		−3.0%
U.S. Decennial Census; 2010-2020

=== 2020 census ===
As of the 2020 census, Ulysses had a population of 5,788. The median age was 33.7 years. 29.8% of residents were under the age of 18 and 14.1% of residents were 65 years of age or older. For every 100 females there were 99.7 males, and for every 100 females age 18 and over there were 96.5 males age 18 and over.

98.2% of residents lived in urban areas, while 1.8% lived in rural areas.

There were 2,084 households in Ulysses, of which 39.4% had children under the age of 18 living in them. Of all households, 54.1% were married-couple households, 16.2% were households with a male householder and no spouse or partner present, and 24.8% were households with a female householder and no spouse or partner present. About 24.4% of all households were made up of individuals and 9.9% had someone living alone who was 65 years of age or older.

There were 2,274 housing units, of which 8.4% were vacant. The homeowner vacancy rate was 1.9% and the rental vacancy rate was 8.1%.

Racial composition as of the 2020 census
Race	Number	Percent
White	3,119	53.9%
Black or African American	8	0.1%
American Indian and Alaska Native	114	2.0%
Asian	12	0.2%
Native Hawaiian and Other Pacific Islander	4	0.1%
Some other race	1,339	23.1%
Two or more races	1,192	20.6%
Hispanic or Latino (of any race)	3,325	57.4%

Income and poverty

The Census Bureau's 2020 5-year American Community Survey showed that the median household income was $51,370 (with a margin of error of +/- $3,714) and the median family income $74,519 (+/- $39,983). Males had a median income of $50,596 (+/- $3,885) versus $25,880 (+/- $6,547) for females. The median income for those above 16 years old was $42,564 (+/- $13,512). Approximately, 4.2% of families and 14.3% of the population were below the poverty line, including 15.6% of those under the age of 18 and 7.0% of those ages 65 or over.

=== 2010 census ===
As of the census of 2010, there were 6,161 people, 2,140 households, and 1,618 families residing in the city. The population density was 1,937.4 inhabitants per square mile (748.0/km^{2}). There were 2,295 housing units at an average density of 721.7 per square mile (278.6/km^{2}). The racial makeup of the city was 78.7% White, 0.7% African American, 1.4% Native American, 0.4% Asian, 16.1% from other races, and 2.6% from two or more races. Hispanic or Latino people of any race were 49.0% of the population.

There were 2,140 households, of which 42.5% had children under the age of 18 living with them, 60.9% were married couples living together, 9.5% had a female householder with no husband present, 5.2% had a male householder with no wife present, and 24.4% were non-families. 21.8% of all households were made up of individuals, and 8.1% had someone living alone who was 65 years of age or older. The average household size was 2.84 and the average family size was 3.32.

The median age in the city was 32.4 years. 31.6% of residents were under the age of 18; 8.7% were between the ages of 18 and 24; 25.1% were from 25 to 44; 24% were from 45 to 64; and 10.7% were 65 years of age or older. The gender makeup of the city was 50.6% male and 49.4% female.

== Education ==
The community is served by Ulysses USD 214 public school district.

== Transportation ==
=== Highways ===
U.S. Route 160 runs east–west through Ulysses, continuing across the state. K-25 runs north–south through the city and state.

=== Air ===
Ulysses Airport (KULS) serves the county and the region with a 6,000 ft. x 100' north south (35-17) runway and a second 4'600 x 60' runway (12-30).

== Media ==
=== Television ===
Ulysses is in the Wichita-Hutchinson, Kansas television market.

KDGU-LD is licensed to Ulysses, Kansas and carries the signal of KDGL-LD in Sublette, Kansas. KDGU-LD broadcasts on RF channel 33, but viewers see channel 23.

== Notable people ==
- Gary Bender (born 1940), sports broadcaster
- Sheri Dew (born 1953), CEO of Deseret Book
- Karen Dillon, filmmaker and arts educator
- Eddie Hare (born 1957), former punter for the New England Patriots
- Sarah Noriega (Sulentor) (born 1976), athlete and Olympian (women's volleyball)
- Eugene Pulliam (1889–1975), newspaper publisher
- Jedediah Smith (1799–1831), mountain man and explorer; killed by Comanches south of Ulysses at Wagon Bed Spring
