= Albert Ely Ives =

American architect (1898–1966)

- Born: July 10, 1898; United States
- Died: March 11, 1966 (aged 67)
- Occupation: Architect

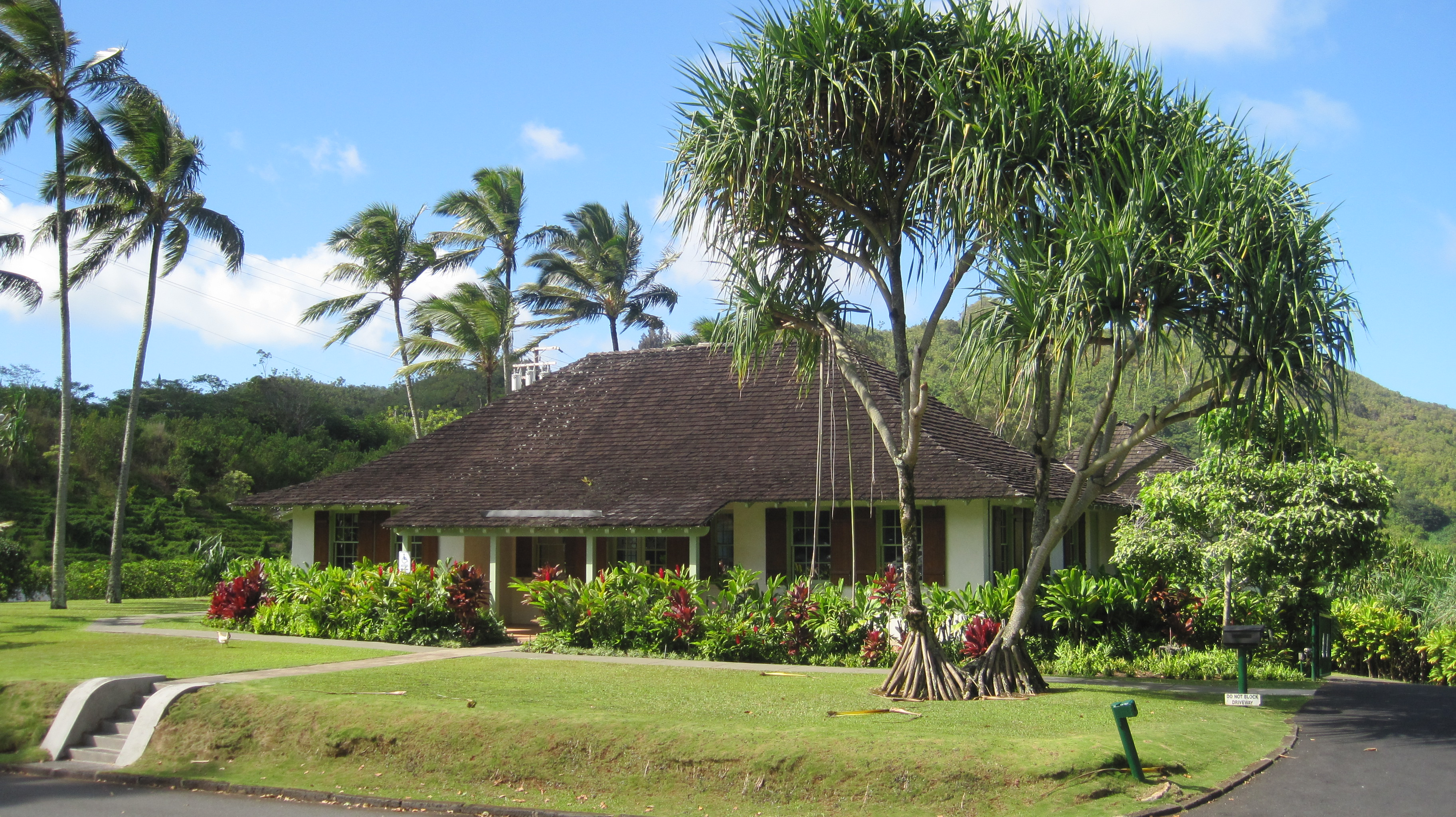
Kaneohe Ranch Building

Albert Ely Ives (July 10, 1898 – March 11, 1966) was an American architect. He partnered in Ives and Hogan, based in Honolulu, Hawaii.

At least two of Ives's works are listed on the National Register of Historic Places.

Works include (with attribution):

- Winterthur, 5105 Kennett Pike, Winterthur, Delaware 19735. Winterthur is the 6th largest extant home in the United States, and the 7th largest ever built in the US.
- Gibraltar, 250 Pennsylvania Avenue Wilmington, Delaware (Ives, Albert Ely; Coffin, Marian Cruger), NRHP-listed
- Kaneohe Ranch Building, Castle Junction, Kailua, Hawaii (Ives, Albert Ely), NRHP-listed
- Plantation Estate, Oahu, Hawaii, built 1948 (Ives and Hogan)
