= Gibraltar (Wilmington, Delaware) =

Historic house in Delaware, United States

- U.S. National Register of Historic Places
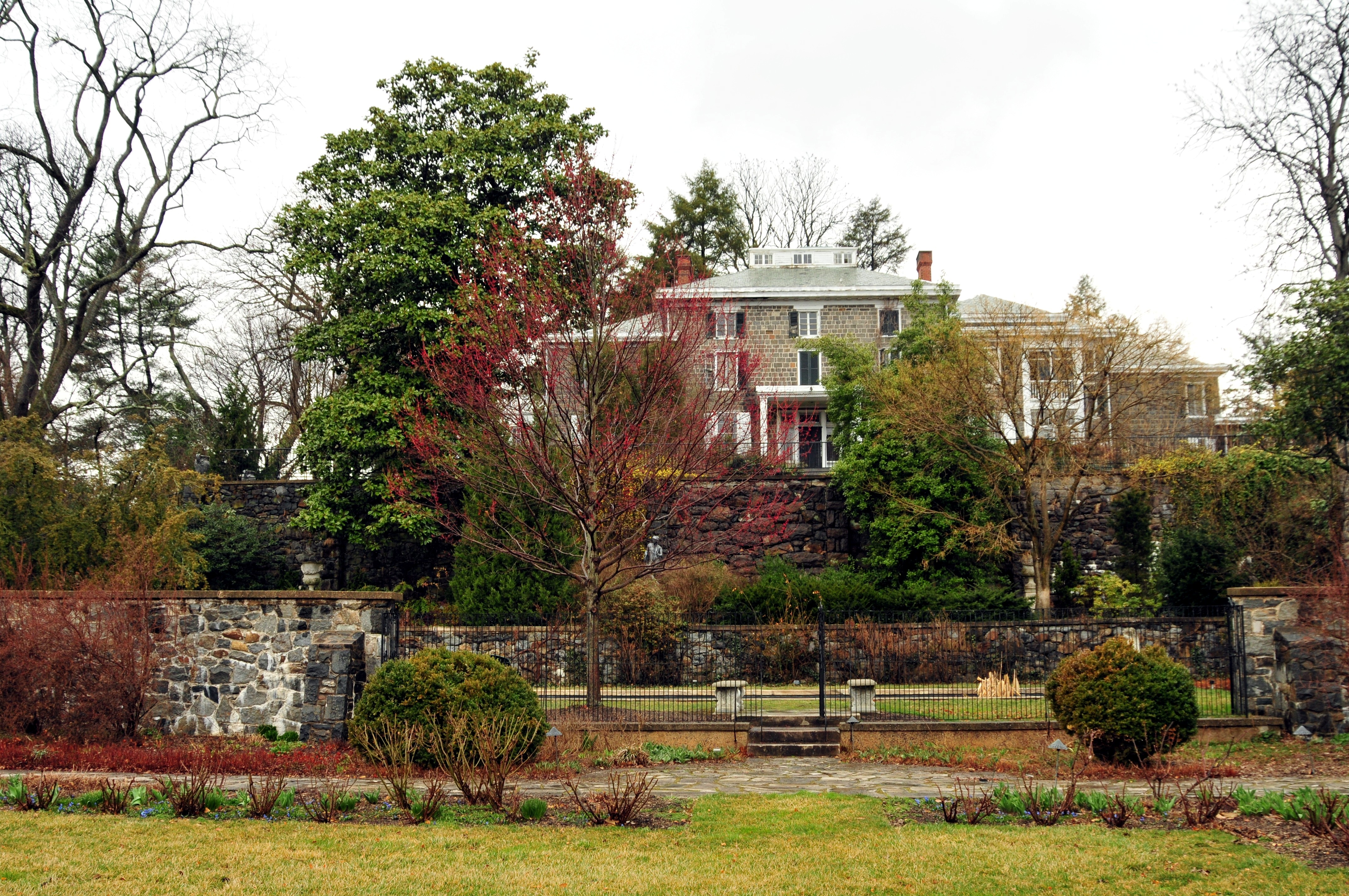

- Location within Delaware Location within the United States
- Location: 2505 Pennsylvania Ave., Wilmington, Delaware
- Coordinates: 39.761389°N 75.575000°W
- Area: 6.1 acres (2.5 ha)
- Built: c. 1844, 1916
- Architect: Ives, Albert Ely; DeArmond, Ashmead and Bickley, et al.
- Architectural style: Colonial Revival, Italianate
- NRHP reference No.: 98001098
- Added to NRHP: September 14, 1998

Gibraltar (previously known as the Hugh Rodney Sharp Mansion), located at 2505 Pennsylvania Avenue in Wilmington, Delaware, is a country estate home dating from c. 1844 that is listed on the National Register of Historic Places. It takes its name from the Rock of Gibraltar, alluding to the high rocky outcrop on which the house was built. It is located just inside Wilmington's city limits and originally stood at the center of a much larger estate which has over time been reduced to the present area of about a city block in size. The house was originally built by John Rodney Brincklé and inherited by his brother's wife and children, before being bought in 1909 by Hugh Rodney Sharp, who was linked to the Du Pont family through marriage and work. Sharp expanded and remodeled the house, as well as commissioning the pioneering female landscape designer Marian Cruger Coffin to lay out the gardens.

The gardens are now owned by a local preservation trust which acquired it in the 1990s after it was threatened with demolition and redevelopment. They have since been restored and opened to the public. The estate was listed in the National Register of Historic Places in 1998 in recognition of its importance as a well-preserved example of the Country Place era of art and design. The mansion, currently owned by a local developer, has not been occupied for many years and its condition has significantly deteriorated.

== History ==
The estate was developed around 1844 by John Rodney Brincklé, grandnephew of the first Governor of Delaware, Caesar Rodney. It was located in the western part of Wilmington just within the city limits and was named for its position on a high rocky outcrop overlooking the city, in an allusion to the Rock of Gibraltar. Brincklé was said to have built it in an unsuccessful attempt to woo a woman from Philadelphia and subsequently used it as a retreat and as a base where he could carry out horticultural experiments and entertain friends and relatives. The estate originally extended over an area of about 80 acres (32 ha). Around 1848 he invited his brother Samuel with his wife and their eight children to move into the house. Samuel purchased it in May 1862 and carried out planting and landscaping works on the property. It passed to his wife Julia on his death and subsequently to their children.

The estate was purchased in 1909 by Hugh Rodney Sharp and his wife, Isabella Mathieu du Pont Sharp, a member of the Du Pont family. In 1915 it was renovated under the direction of Philadelphia architects DeArmond, Ashmead and Bickley. The house's interior decor includes Colonial Revival and Italianate architecture and contains works by Albert Ely Ives and others. Between 1916 and 1923, the pioneering female landscape architect Marian Cruger Coffin laid out the gardens.

Sharp died in 1968 and the estate was inherited by his son, Hugh Rodney Sharp Jr., who did not share his father's interest in horticulture. By the time he died in 1990 the gardens had not been maintained for many years and were badly overgrown. The estate was put up for sale after his death and was saved from demolition after a campaign by local people and the Preservation Delaware organization. The Delaware Open Space Council bought the development rights to the property and the Sharp family donated the estate to Preservation Delaware. In 1998 the estate was listed on the National Register of Historic Places. The listing included works of art, a house, a horticultural facility, secondary structures, and street furniture/objects. It included five contributing buildings, seven contributing structures and 48 contributing objects. The gardens were opened to the public in 1999. Access is free and is permitted daily between dawn and dusk.

The mansion is not open to the public and is in a poor condition, having stood empty for over 20 years. After Preservation Delaware acquired the estate, a conversion easement was placed on the property with the intention of refurbishing it as a 31-room hotel. The estate's greenhouses were to be converted into a restaurant. An Exeter, New Hampshire company called Someplace(s) Different which operates historic hotels in the US and Canada signed an agreement to handle the conversion. However, this fell through. A few years later another company, CCS Investors of Yorklyn, Delaware, proposed to convert the mansion into commercial office space. Rent money and profits from the development would be used by Preservation Delaware to finance the building's maintenance and restoration. The proposal was opposed by a number of the estate's neighbors who were concerned about the effect on local traffic. The dispute resulted in a three-year legal battle which eventually reached the Delaware Supreme Court. On July 16, 2009, the court ruled in favor of the developer's request to change the estate's zoning status from residential to commercial.

== Architecture ==
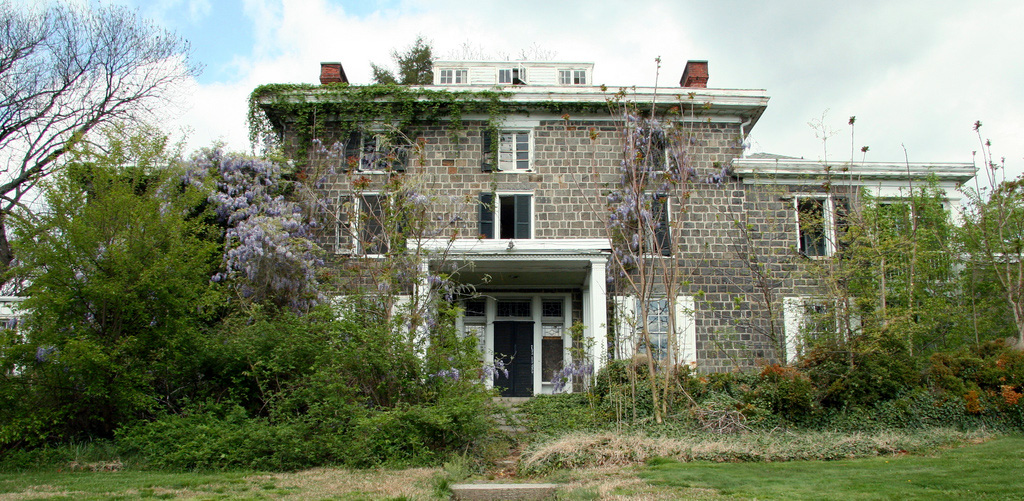
The entrance to the mansion, which is now in a dilapidated condition

The estate occupies an area equivalent to an entire city block, surrounded by a stone wall standing 6 ft (1.8 m) high with entrances on Pennsylvania Avenue and Greenhill Avenue. Pillars stand at each entrance, topped with stone vases decorated with carved floral ornaments. The mansion sits on an elevation which slopes gently down to the west but drops sharply away to the east, overlooking the gardens.

The core of the irregularly-shaped mansion is a three-story building facing east – the original Italianate house erected by Brincklé – with several wings added by the Sharps in the early 20th century. The wing to the north was built around 1915 to accommodate a dining room and porch, with a service annex behind. Another three-story wing was built at the same time to the west. The east porch appears to have been reduced to its present appearance and its Doric columns changed to square-section pillars. The architects for this expansion were the Philadelphia firm of De Armond, Ashmead and Bickley.

Around 1927, a two-story wing was built to the south of the core of the house to enlarge the living room and accommodate a conservatory. More alterations were made to the north elevation by Wilmington architect Albert Ely Ives, who oversaw the addition of a two- and three-story service wing with a one-story porch. The interior of the house is decorated in a variety of styles, principally Federal style, with a Greek Revival living room and a Colonial Revival library.

The exterior walls are made from Brandywine granite quarried locally from a site near the estate. The roofing comprises five linked slate hip roofs with flat roofs over the southeast and northeast wings, the conservatory and the front portico. A cupola occupies the center of the main roof with a widow's walk capping it.

On the east façade, the ground floor has four symmetrically spaced windows with paneled shutters, above which are corresponding casement windows with louvered shutters on the second and third stories. The house was entered through the front portico, located on the east side, which stands one story high with columns supporting the roof of the portico.

A carriage house stands next to the mansion. Built in the 19th century, the Sharps enlarged it and converted it to house a pool and a filter room. They also added a greenhouse and garage, constructed by Pierson U-Bar Co. of New York City, which included a laundry and living quarters above the garage for their chauffeurs.

== Gardens ==
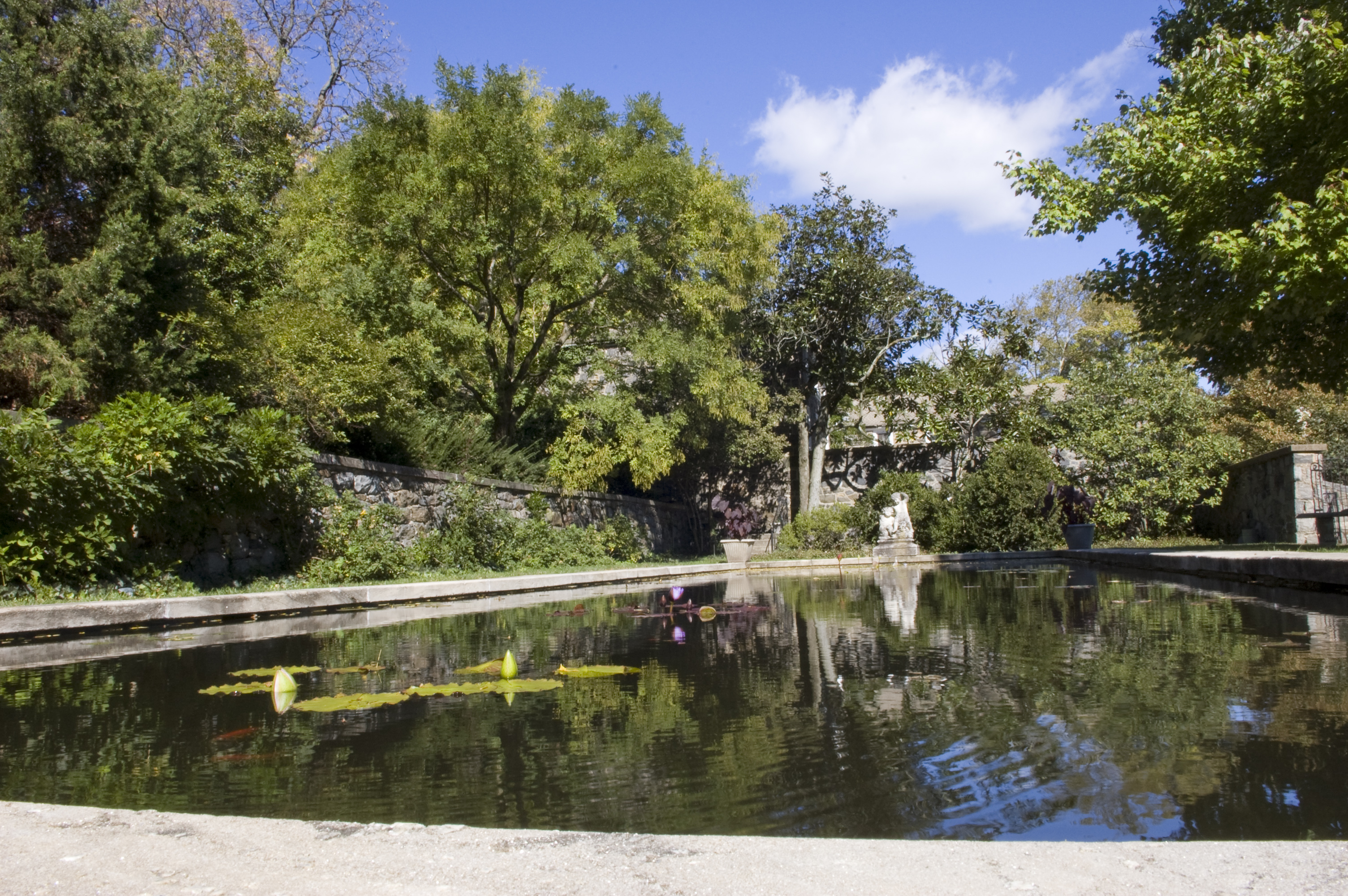
The Reflecting Pool in the gardens of Gibraltar

The gardens were designed by Marian Cruger Coffin, one of the first female landscape architects in the United States, who had a lengthy track record of designing gardens on the East Coast. During the first half of the 20th century she was responsible for the design of over 130 gardens, many of which were commissioned by the Du Ponts. Hugh Rodney Sharp was related by marriage to Henry Francis du Pont, who was a long-standing friend of Coffin and may have recommended her for the task of creating the garden at Gibraltar.

Coffin laid out the gardens of Gibraltar between 1916 and 1923, having been commissioned by the Sharps to landscape a 2-acre (0.81 ha) piece of land on the estate. She designed it in an Italianate Beaux-Arts style as a series of "rooms" to parallel the layout of the mansion. It has a strongly geometric layout profusely planted in a style reminiscent of an informal English garden. Numerous architectural and decorative elements such as fountains, statues, urns and hand-forged iron gates provide additional ornamentation. The Sharps chose the statues themselves and bought them during their travels to England, France, Italy and Hong Kong. Coffin had designed the gardens with the intention of displaying statues in particular focal points and niches, and gave the Sharps guidelines about what kind of statues to look for. She occasionally traveled with them while they were looking for pieces to buy.

The gardens are built in a series of terraces descending down the slope from the outcrop on which the house stands. From top to bottom, there is a drop of about 30 feet (9.1 m). A curving staircase made from marble links the house to the bottom of the terraces, descending through the Flagstone, Evergreen and Pool terraces to the Flower Garden at the bottom. The latter is planted along the lines of a color wheel in a style closely resembling that of Gertrude Jekyll. From the Flower Garden, a 200 feet (61 m) long avenue of Bald Cypresses (planted between 1921 and 1925) leads to a large fountain and a teahouse that the Sharps used for lunches and to entertain guests.

The gardens and statues were restored in 1998–99 by Rodney Robinson Landscape Architects with the support of the Sharp family, who provided the restorers with Coffin's original plans from 1916. Only a few of the original trees remained but the restorers followed Coffin's plans to replant the garden in its original form. The fountains, ironwork, walkways and other architectural and decorative elements were also renovated. Several of Coffin's other formal gardens have been re-created, but Gibraltar is considered to be the most accurate of the re-creations.
