= Noerenberg Estate Barn =

Barn on the National Register of Historic Places in Minnesota

- U.S. National Register of Historic Places
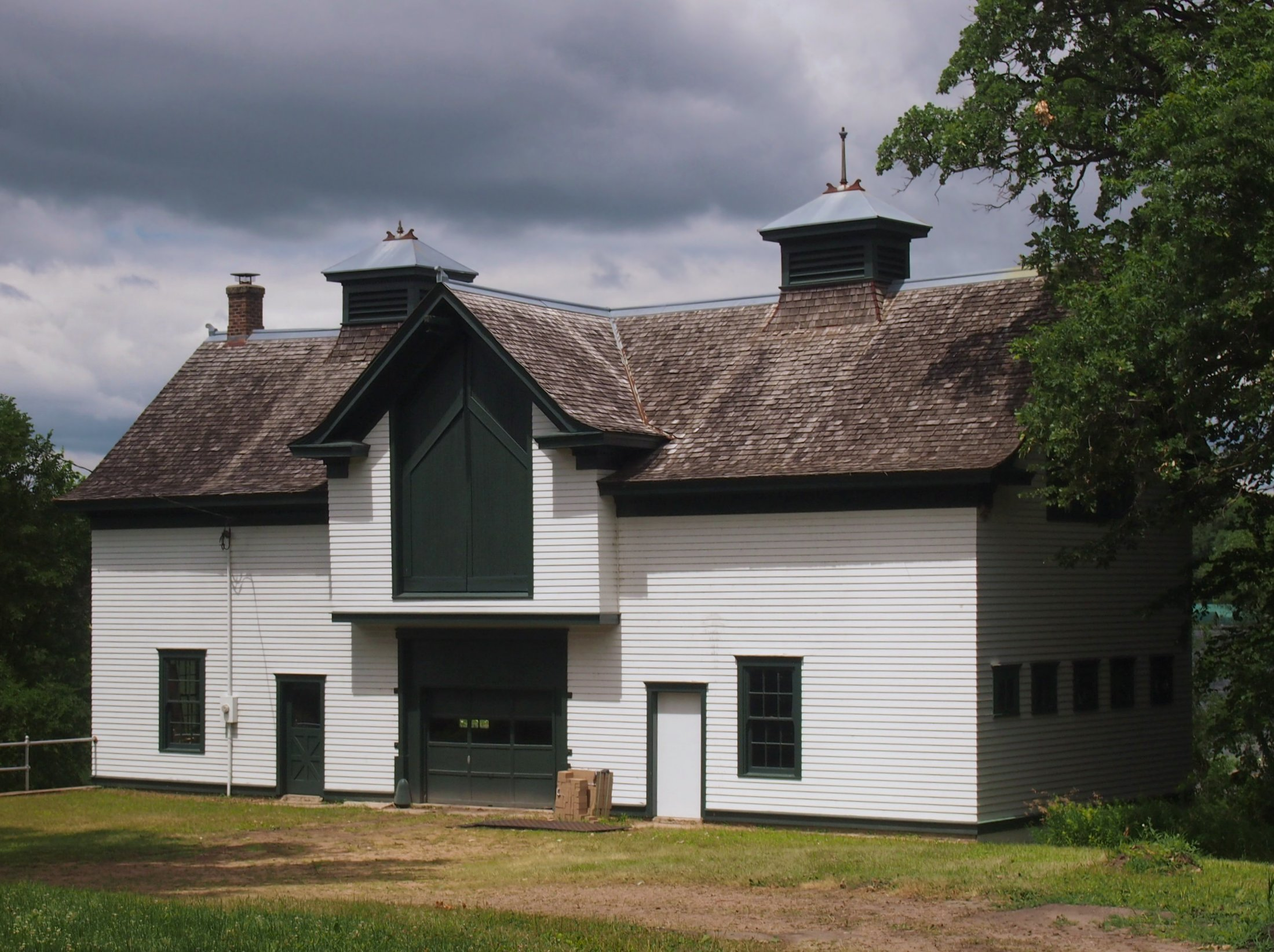
- The Noerenberg Estate Barn in 2016

- Location within Minnesota
- Location: 2865 N. Shore Dr., Orono, Minnesota
- Coordinates: 44°57′17″N 93°35′39″W
- Area: 6 acres (2.4 ha)
- NRHP reference No.: 15000527
- Added to NRHP: August 18, 2015

The Noerenberg Estate Barn is a historic barn on a Lake Minnetonka estate in Orono, Minnesota. It is one of only a few surviving farm buildings built on Lake Minnetonka during the Country Place Era. The barn was listed on the National Register of Historic Places in 2015 for its architecture.

The Country Place Era refers to a time in the late 19th and early 20th centuries when wealthy people built large estates in rural areas as a means of escape from the heat and congestion of urban areas. These estates often included working farms so their owners could feel connected with the land and to get the benefits of a rural life. The farms were managed as serious operations, not simply as diversions, and would employ the best agricultural practices known at the time. Wealthy owners would employ architects to design substantial structures that were more detailed than the utilitarian structures of most farmers. The Noerenberg Estate Barn features ornate architectural details such as dentil courses and Palladian window treatments. For the comfort of the farm animals, the barn also includes a large number of windows and employs complex ventilation and feed delivery systems. Besides the barn, the contributing structures include an industrial-sized water tower and a reinforced concrete fuel storage structure.

The owner of the estate, Frederick D. Noerenberg, was born in Pomerania, Prussia in 1845. He emigrated to the United States with his family in 1860 and settled in St. Paul, Minnesota. He operated a hotel and later found employment at a brewery, then moved to Minneapolis in 1875 and became a partner of the City Brewery with Anton Zahler. In May 1880, Anton Zahler died, so Noerenberg took control of the company and renamed it the F.D. Noerenberg Brewing Company. In 1890, several breweries including Noerenberg's consolidated and formed the Minneapolis Brewing and Malting Company. The company built a large facility, now known as the Grain Belt Brewery, in northeast Minneapolis. In 1903, Noerenberg became the president of the company.

Noerenberg purchased 73 acres (30 ha) on Lake Minnetonka in 1890, with 8,490 feet (2,590 m) of shoreline on both Crystal and Maxwell Bays. He had a Queen Anne style mansion built on the south side of the road that traversed the property. Noerenberg and his wife Johanna established formal gardens to the east of the house and planted many trees, such as Scotch pine, Norway spruce, paper birch, Ohio buckeye, sugar maple, American elm, common hackberry, and native oak. They named their estate "Wilkommen", which is German for "welcome", and entertained their friends and relatives with large parties. On the north side of the road, Noerenberg built a farm that included the barn, a water tower, a granary, a shed, chicken coops, a greenhouse, and a farm house. Farm animals included horses, dairy cows, sheep, chickens, turkeys, ducks, geese, and guinea hens, and there was a large vegetable garden that grew tomatoes, potatoes, corn, squash, and other vegetables. The designer of the barn is unknown, but one possibility is that the firm of Boehme and Cordella designed it. Boehme and Cordella designed the bottling house at the Minneapolis Brewing Company brewery in 1906, as well as a warehouse in 1910. They also designed and remodeled buildings for the company in other parts of Minneapolis, including stores, offices, and taverns.

Frederick Noerenberg died in 1932, and his wife died in 1938. Their three children, Harold, Winnefred, and Lora Noerenberg Hoppe inherited the estate and continued managing the estate as their parents did. There were about 17 employees on the estate who cared for the house, farm, and gardens. The farm continued to operate into the modern era, with sheep still grazing the meadows in the 1960s and hay being harvested in the 1970s. As urban sprawl reached the Lake Minnetonka area, land values increased sharply, and the large estate farms of the gentleman farmer ended up demolished or subdivided. The Noerenberg farm is an exception, because it was bequeathed to the public with the land and lakeshore intact and undivided. Lora, the last surviving child, willed the estate to the public in memory of her parents. She left 50 acres (20 ha) to the Nature Conservancy to be left in a natural state where wild fowl can congregate and 30 acres (12 ha) to the Hennepin County Park Reserve District (now the Three Rivers Park District) to be known as Noerenberg Memorial County Park. The will stated that the estate house had to be torn down, with an arbor to be built on the site, and that the 30-acre parcel would be used for an arboretum and garden display area. Boating, camping, and picnicking were not allowed in the park per terms of the will.
