= DeArmond, Ashmead & Bickley =

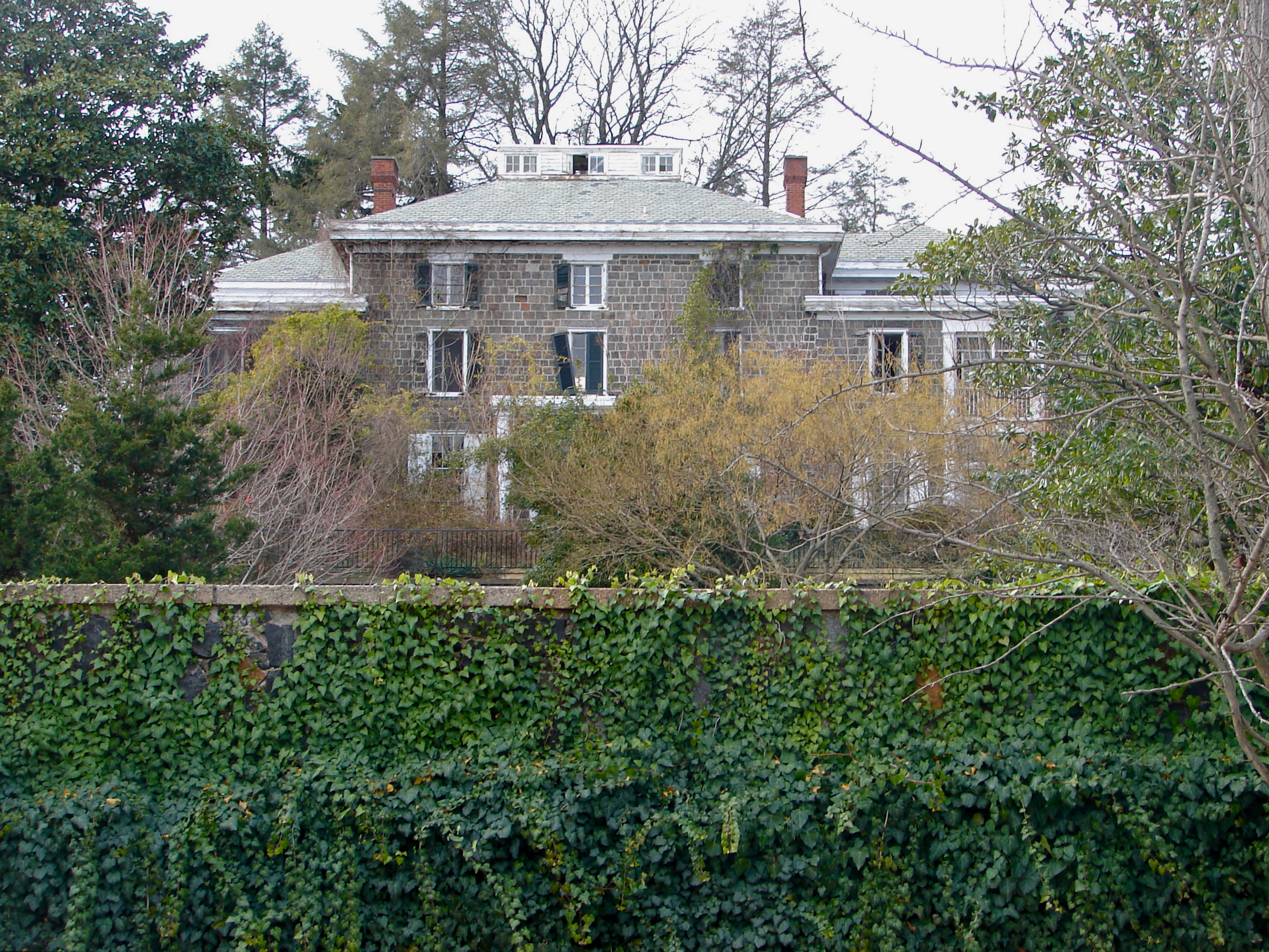
"Gibraltar" (1844, altered by D, A & B 1915), Wilmington, Delaware.

DeArmond, Ashmead & Bickley was an early-20th-century architecture and landscape architecture firm based in Philadelphia. It specialized in Colonial Revival, Beaux-Arts, and English Arts & Crafts-style buildings, especially suburban houses.

Clarence DeArmond (1880-1953) was a 1903 graduate of the University of Pennsylvania. He worked under Frank Miles Day, and formed a 1908 partnership with Duffield Ashmead Jr. (1883-1952). Ashmead was a 1906 graduate of the University of Pennsylvania, who had studied under Paul Cret, and worked under Wilson Eyre. In 1911, the duo brought in a third partner, George H. Bickley (1880-1938), a 1903 graduate of the University of Pennsylvania and a 1907 graduate of the École des Beaux-Arts, who worked under Horace Trumbauer.

One of the firm's notable commissions was for alterations to "Fairwold," an 1888 Shingle-style summer house in Camp Hill, Pennsylvania, designed by Wilson Eyre for T. Craig Heberton. In 1916, second owner Richard M. Cadwalader Jr. hired D, A & B to face the shingled walls with stone, and expand the house into a Tudor-revival mansion. Eyre's understated Arts & Crafts interiors were replaced by literalist period-revival set pieces. Six years later, D, A & B added a massive music-room/solarium addition (with pipe organ and musicians' balcony), that was larger than the original house. The building is now Or Hadash Synagogue.

D, A & B also made major alterations to Cadwalader's Philadelphia residence. They stripped the 1860 townhouse of its brick-and-brownstone facade and stoop, replacing it with a limestone Beaux-Arts facade. In 1964, this became the Delancey Place house of the author Pearl Buck.

The firm disbanded soon after Bickley's death in 1938. DeArmond worked briefly for the Philadelphia Housing Authority in the 1930s, and was one of the architects of the Hill Creek Housing Project.

== Selected works ==
- Thomas G. Stockhausen House, 401 West Moreland Avenue, Chestnut Hill, Philadelphia, 1913–14.
- Dayton House, Wynnewood, Pennsylvania, ca. 1914.
- Mary C. Gibson House, Wynnewood, Pennsylvania, c. 1914, altered by D, A & B 1926.
- Alterations to "Gibraltar" (Hugh Rodney Sharpe Mansion), 2501 Pennsylvania Avenue, Wilmington, Delaware, 1915. D, A & B altered an 1844 Italianate house into a Colonial-Revival mansion. Listed on the National Register of Historic Places
- "Marvel Farm" (Josiah Marvel House), Wilmington, Delaware, 1915.
- Franklin Trust Company, 18 South 15th Street, Philadelphia, 1916. The 12-story office building is now part of the Ellington Condominiums.
- Alterations to "Fairwold" (Richard M. Cadwalader Jr. Mansion), Camp Hill Road, Camp Hill, Pennsylvania, 1916–17 and 1923. Now Or Hadash Synagogue.
- Alterations to Richard M. Cadwalader Townhouse, 2019 Delancey Street, Philadelphia, 1918.
