= Camp Hill, Montgomery County, Pennsylvania =

Unincorporated community in Pennsylvania, US

Camp Hill, Pennsylvania
- Unincorporated community
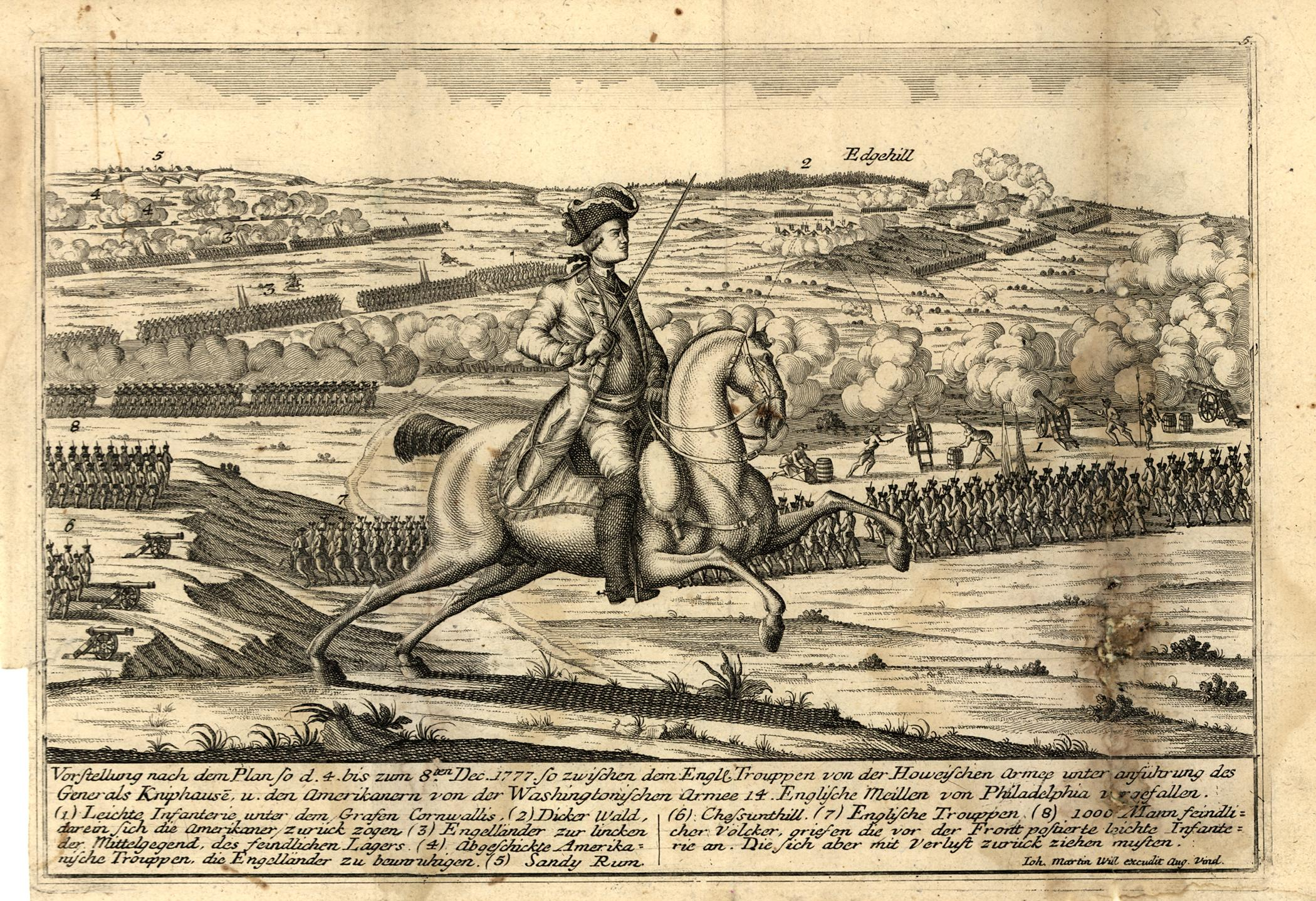
- Battle of White Marsh (December 5–8, 1778). Camp Hill (labeled "Sandy Run") is at upper left.

- Location within the state of Pennsylvania Camp Hill, Pennsylvania (the United States)
- Coordinates: 40°07′35.94″N 75°11′40.52″W
- Country: United States of America
- State: Pennsylvania
- County: Montgomery
- Township: Whitemarsh; Upper Dublin; Springfield
- Time zone: UTC-5 (EST)
  - Summer (DST): UTC-4 (EDT)
- ZIP codes: 19034
- Area code: 215

Camp Hill is an unincorporated community that straddles Whitemarsh Township, Upper Dublin Township, and Springfield Township, Montgomery County, Pennsylvania, United States. Located approximately three miles outside Philadelphia, the area played a role in the Revolutionary War.

== History ==
Following the September 11, 1777 Battle of Brandywine, the British Army occupied Philadelphia. Camp Hill was one of three adjacent hills outside the city held by General George Washington and 11,000 Continental troops, beginning November 2, 1777. The others were Militia Hill, to the west, now part of Fort Washington State Park; and Fort Hill, to the north, now Fort Washington, Pennsylvania. The December 5–8, 1777 Battle of White Marsh took place on the plain below the hills. Despite three days of fighting, General Sir William Howe was unable to overcome the strategic advantage that the topography gave Washington, and withdrew back to Philadelphia. The name "Camp Hill" comes from the thousands of Continental soldiers' tents that once covered it.

Ten years later, Washington returned to Philadelphia as a delegate to the 1787 Constitutional Convention. He toured the White Marsh battlefield with his friend, Robert Morris.

Camp Hill was the site of the Great Train Wreck of 1856, the worst railroad disaster in world history up to that time. Two passenger trains, heading toward each other on a single track, collided on a blind curve. Approximately 60 people, mostly children on their way to a Sunday School picnic, were killed and more than 100 were injured.

== Geography ==
The topography of the area, an outcropping of high ground surrounded by lowlands, made Camp Hill a popular location for Gilded Age country houses. Dreshertown Road runs along the crest of Camp Hill, and features both custom houses and suburban developments. Camp Hill Road runs north–south over the rise of the elevation and features custom single family homes.

Sandy Run (Wissahickon Creek) flows along the south side of Camp Hill; Pine Run flows along the north side. The Pennsylvania Turnpike passes just north of Camp Hill, and the 309 Expressway passes to the west.

== Industry ==
McNeil Pharmaceuticals, the manufacturer of Tylenol and Motrin, built its corporate headquarters and manufacturing plant on Camp Hill Road in the 1960s. Now a subsidiary of Johnson & Johnson, the plant closed in April 2010.

Camp Hill shares Fort Washington's zip code of 19034.

== Points of interest ==
- Scheetz Farm (1729), 7161 Camp Hill Road, Springfield Township. Scheetz built a papermill along Sandy Run in 1759. It burned and was demolished in 1969.
- George Emlen House (1745), Pennsylvania Avenue, Springfield and Upper Dublin Townships. Washington's headquarters, November 2–December 11, 1777.
- "Camp Hill Hall," John R. Fell House (1882), 709 Pennsylvania Avenue, Whitemarsh and Upper Dublin Townships. Now the United States headquarters for the missionary organization WEC International.
- "Fairwold," T. Craig Heberton House (1888), Camp Hill Road, Upper Dublin Township, Wilson Eyre, architect. Greatly expanded in the early 20th century by DeArmond, Ashmead & Bickley, it is now Or Hadash Synagogue.
- "Hawkswell," Howard H. Henry House (1904), Camp Hill Road & Pennsylvania Avenue, Springfield and Upper Dublin Townships, Wilson Eyre, architect. Renamed "Copernicus House" in the 1970s, it served as headquarters for the Copernicus Society of America.
- "Ridgewood Farm," William Frazier Harrison House (1909), 511 Dreshertown Road, Upper Dublin Township. The 250-acre estate is now Manufacturers' Golf & Country Club.
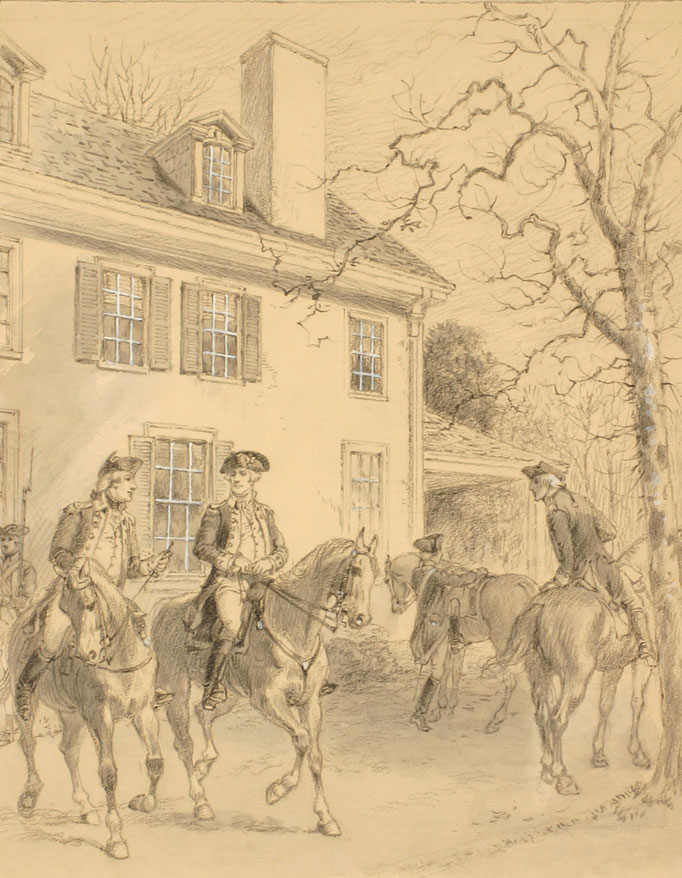
George Emlen House
