= Twin Bridges Rural Historic District =

Historic district in Pennsylvania, United States

- U.S. National Register of Historic Places
- U.S. Historic district
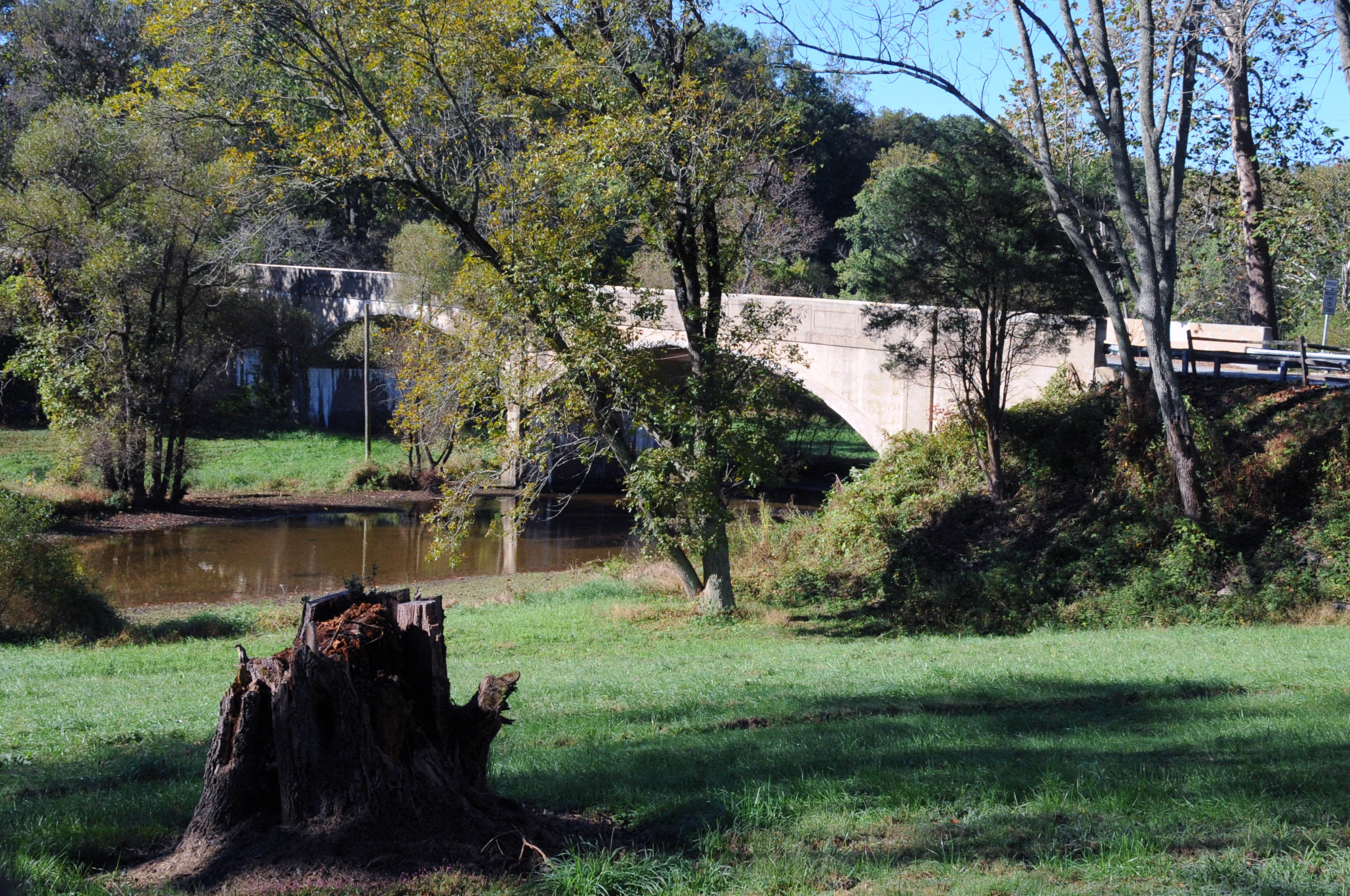

- Location within Pennsylvania
- Location: Roughly bounded by Creek and Bullock Rds., the Beverly Farm, Big Bend, and Hill Girt Farms estates, and Brandywine Creek, in Chadds Ford Township, Delaware County, Pennsylvania and Pennsbury Township, Pennsylvania
- Coordinates: 39°51′05″N 75°35′12″W
- Area: 1,862 acres (7.54 km^{2})
- NRHP reference No.: 100001635
- Added to NRHP: September 18, 2017

The Twin Bridges Rural Historic District is a historic district in Chadds Ford Township, Delaware County, Pennsylvania and Pennsbury Township, Pennsylvania.

== History and architectural features ==
Listed on the National Register of Historic Places in 2017, its nomination asserted that the district "exhibits a cohesive collection of distinctive architectural resources and landscape features that identify it as an important enclave in the Lower Brandywine Creek Valley of the two types of country estates that were being created within the time frame of the American Country Estate Movement."

"The Period of Significance for the proposed Twin Bridges Rural Historic District begins in 1914 with the acquisition of the first farm that became part of the Bissell Estate and ends in 1947 when Beverly Farm was broken up and sold, and falls within the period of time (the mid-Nineteenth through the mid-Twentieth Centuries) when wealthy Americans were emulating the English aristocratic lifestyle of refined country living. It includes the years when its three prominent families - the Bissells (1914-1929), the Haskells (1916-1930), and the Holladays (1916-1930) - acquired a number of farms to create their respective country estates."
