= Kaneohe Ranch Building =

- U.S. National Register of Historic Places
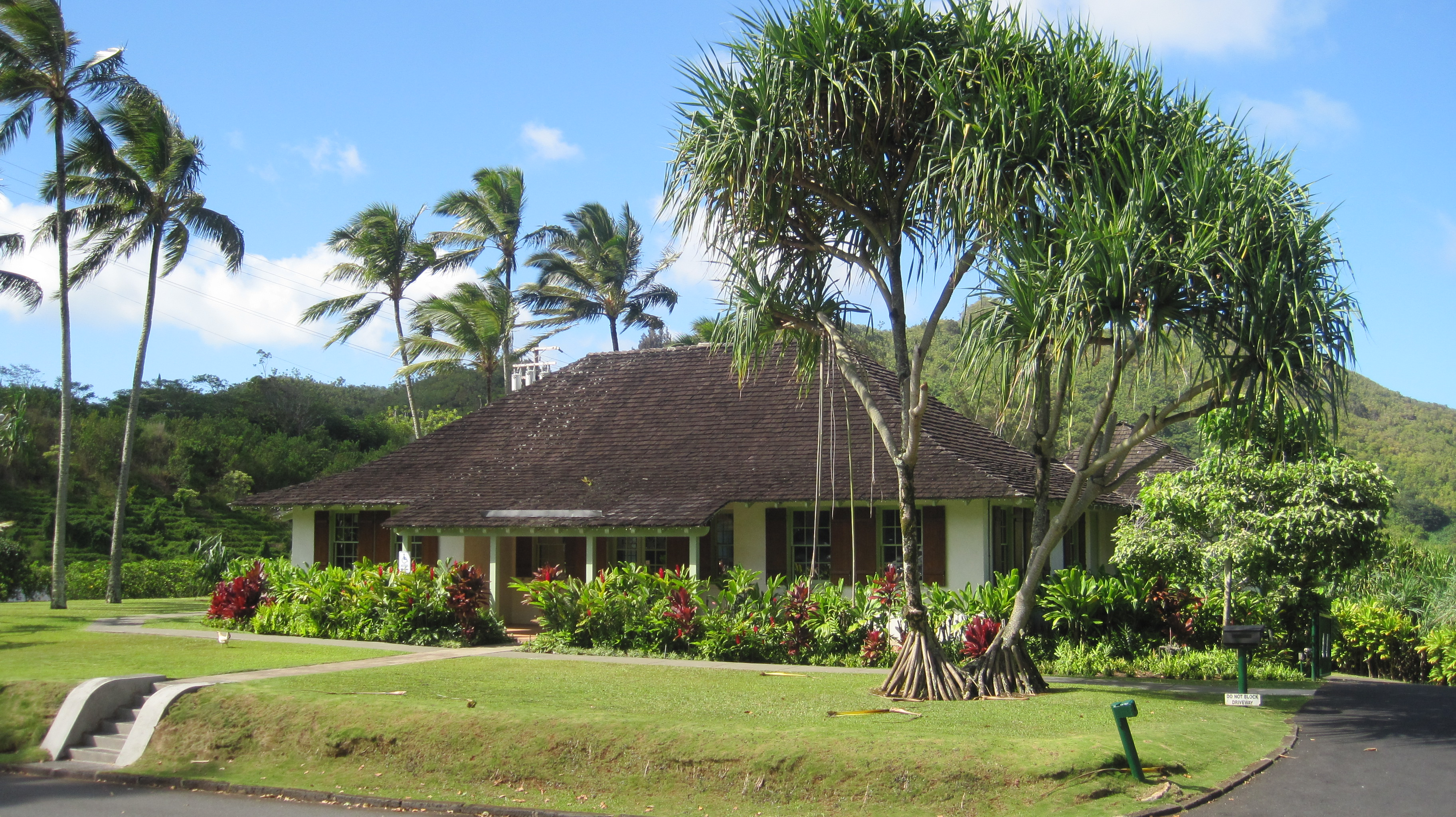
- Corner view

- Location within Oahu Location within Hawaii
- Nearest city: Kailua, Hawaii
- Coordinates: 21.375003°N 157.780419°W
- Area: 1 acre (0.40 ha)
- Built: 1940
- Architect: Albert Ely Ives
- Architectural style: Hawaiian style
- NRHP reference No.: 87001150
- Added to NRHP: June 5, 1987

The Kaneohe Ranch Building at Castle Junction, where the Pali Highway (Route 61), Kamehameha Highway (Route 83), and Kalanianaʻole Highway (Route 72) intersect on the windward side of Oʻahu, was built in 1940 to be the headquarters of Kaneohe Ranch, which owned 12,000 acres (49 km^{2}) of surrounding land and played a major role in the history of Kāneʻohe and Kailua. The building is significant both for its association with the Ranch and for its Hawaiian style architecture designed by Albert Ely Ives (1898-1966). Ives' other work on the windward side includes Plantation Estate which is the Winter White House of Barack Obama. The building was added to the National Register of Historic Places on 5 June 1987.

The building exhibits key features of the style of Hawaiian architecture that developed during the 1920s and 1930s: the double-pitched Dickey roof with overhanging eaves, plaster-covered masonry walls, and ample cross-ventilation. Its architect was best known for his residential work; this is one of his few commercial buildings.

During the mid-19th century, most of the land in the area belonged to Kalama, Queen Consort of Kamehameha III and later Queen Dowager of the Kingdom of Hawaiʻi. She and Judge Charles Coffin Harris began a sugarcane plantation on the land, but after she died in 1870 and it failed in 1871, the land eventually passed to Harris's daughter, Nannie H. Rice, who in 1893 leased 15,000 acres (61 km^{2}) to J. P. Mendonca, who founded Kaneohe Ranch in 1894. Lower-lying wetlands were leased to Chinese rice farmers. In 1907 James Bicknell Castle became the principal stockholder of the Ranch, and 1917 his son, Harold K.L. Castle, purchased the land from Mrs. Rice. Most of the land was used for cattle-ranching until World War II, when the military took over much of it. After the war, former ranch lands have provided room for ever expanding residential subdivisions.

== Gallery ==
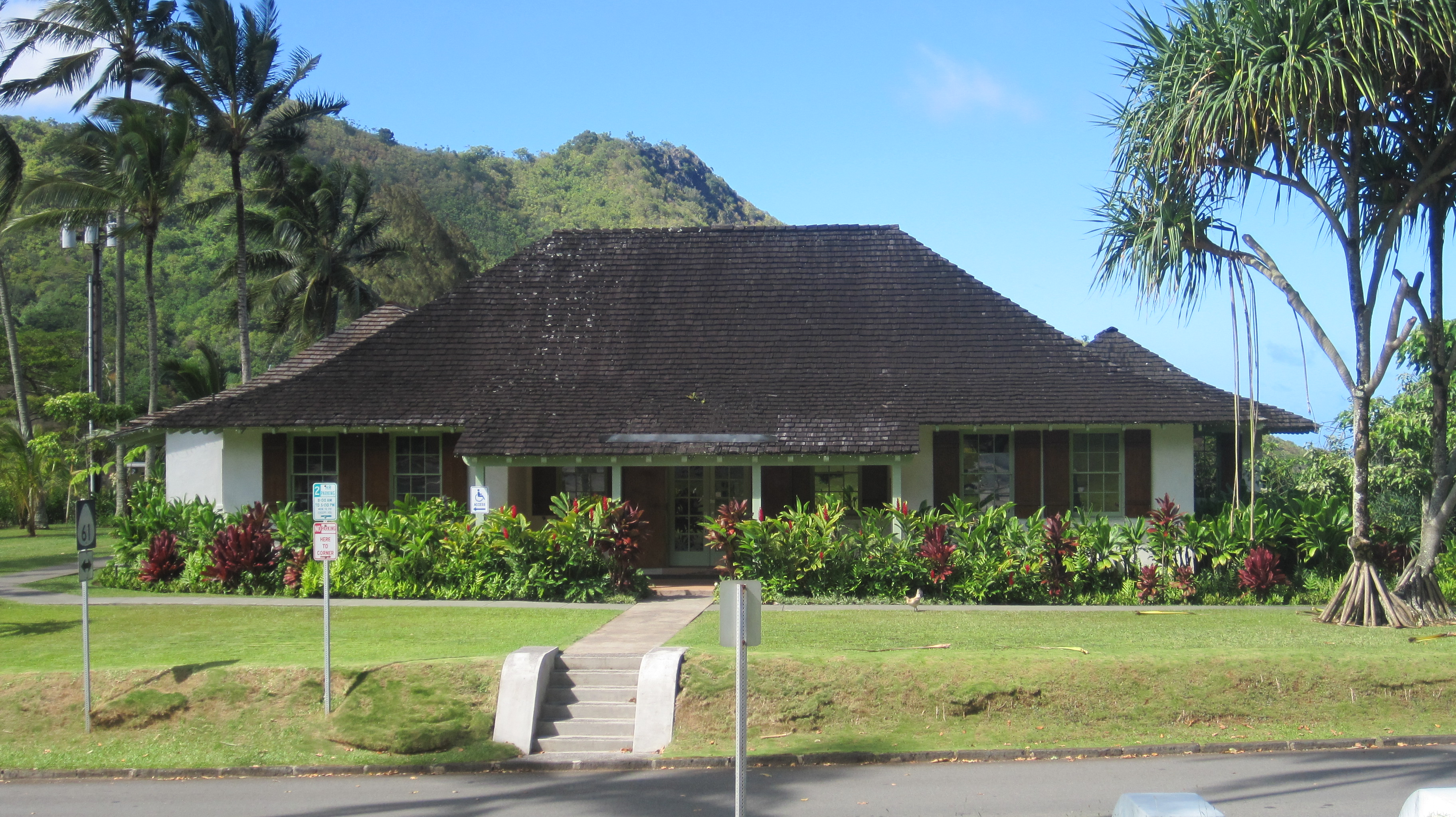
Front across Auloa Rd.

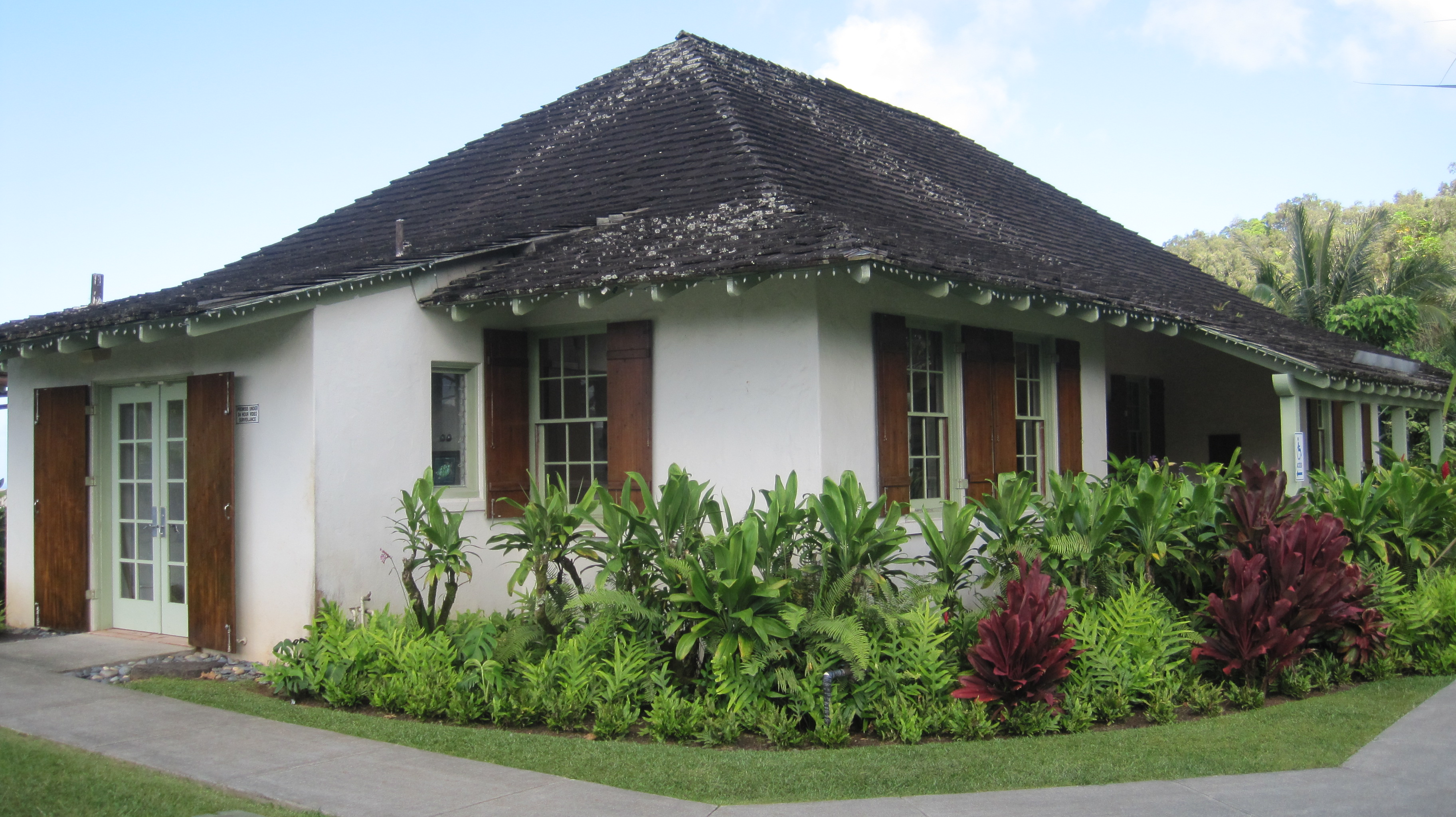
Southwest corner

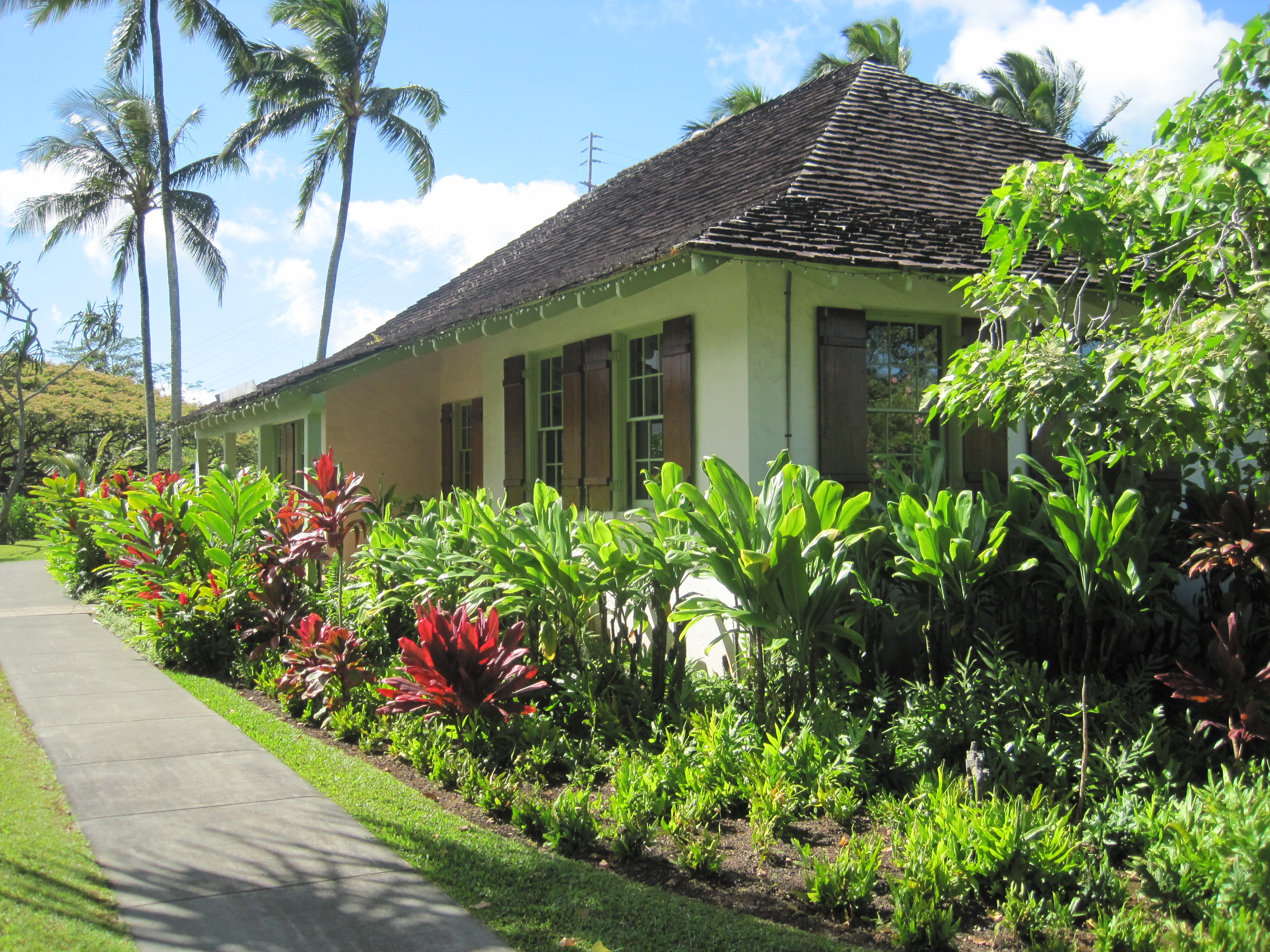
Southeast corner

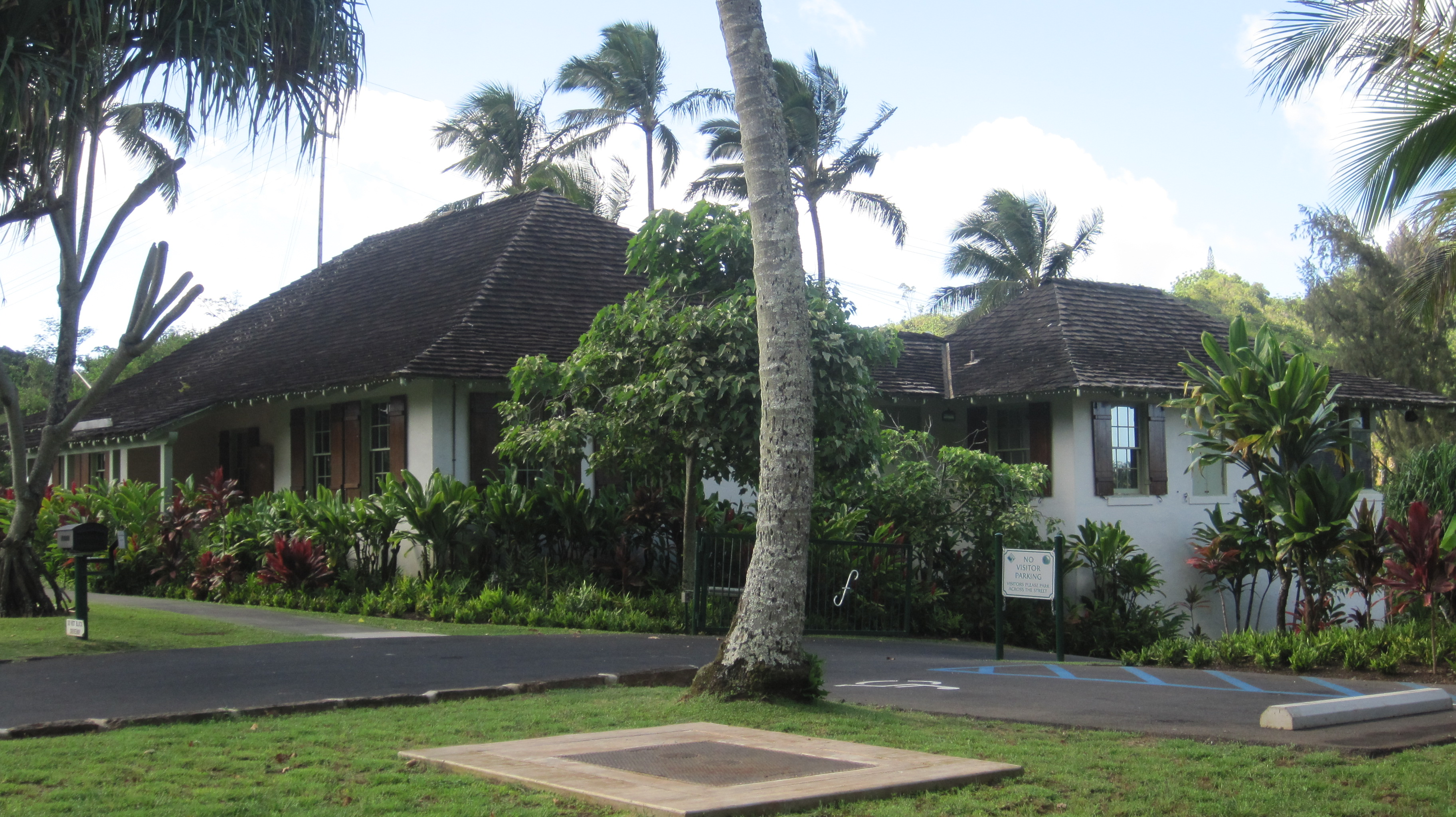
View from uphill

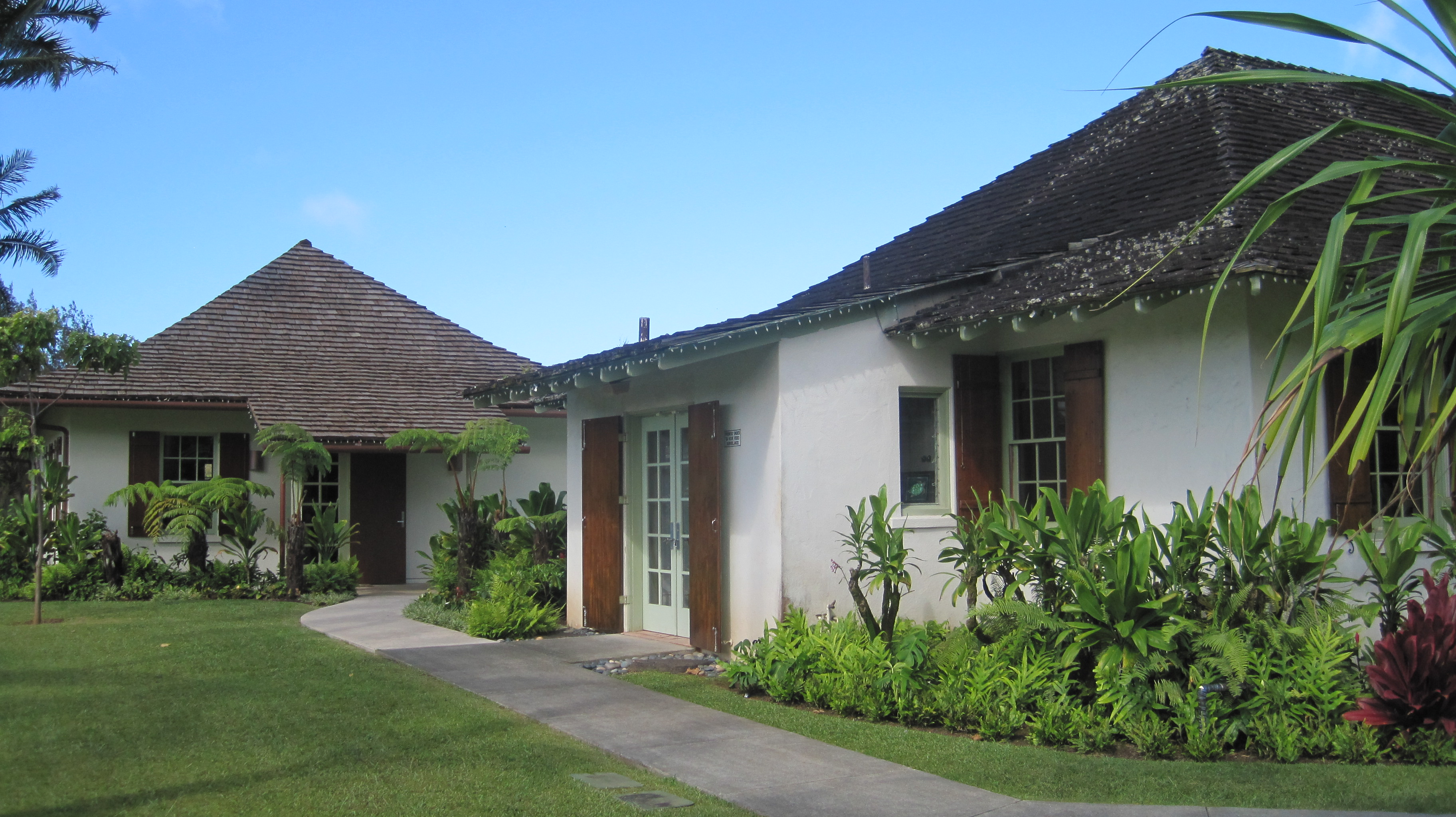
Castle Foundation Building entrance

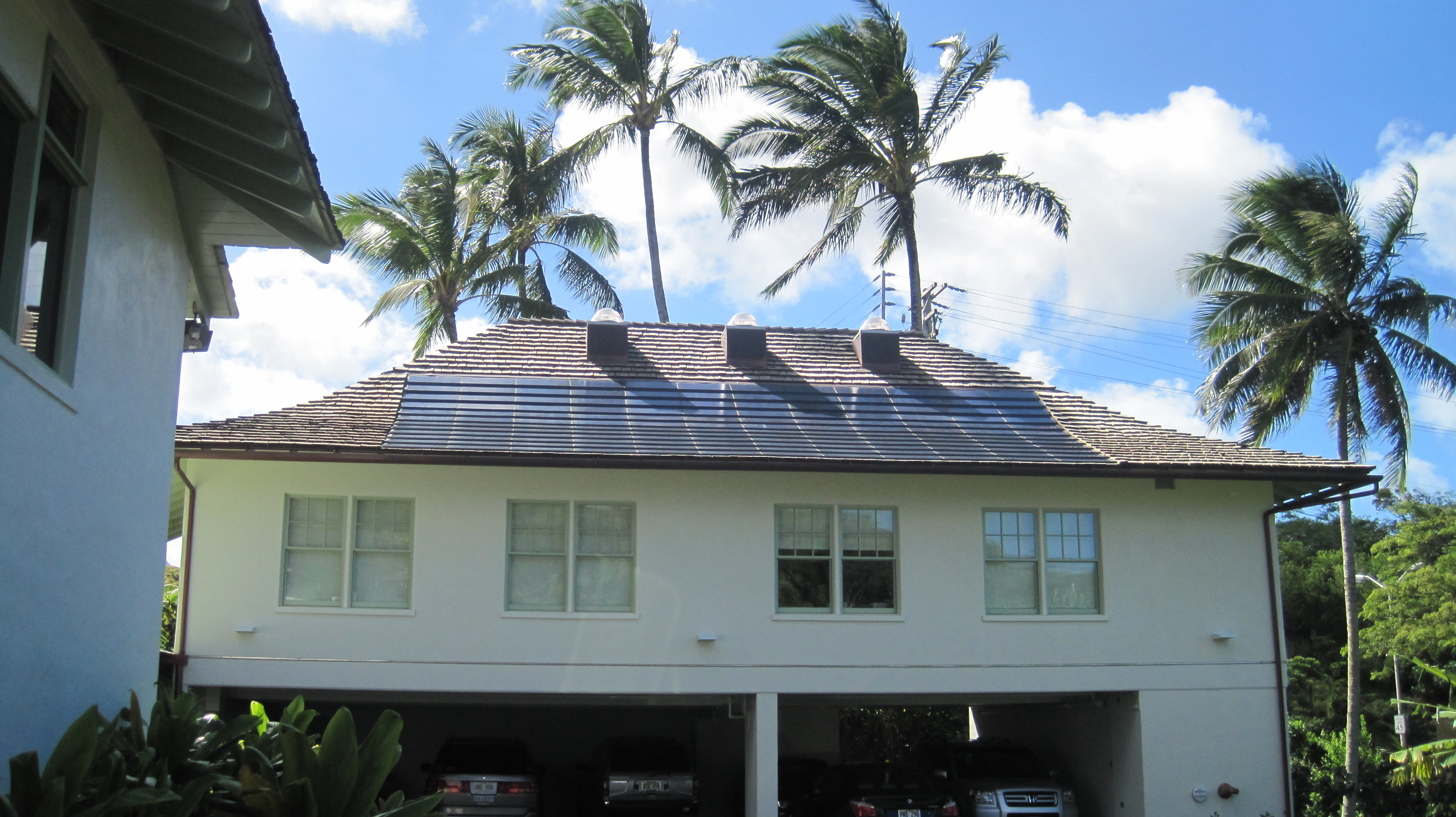
Castle Foundation Building side view
