= Country Place Era =

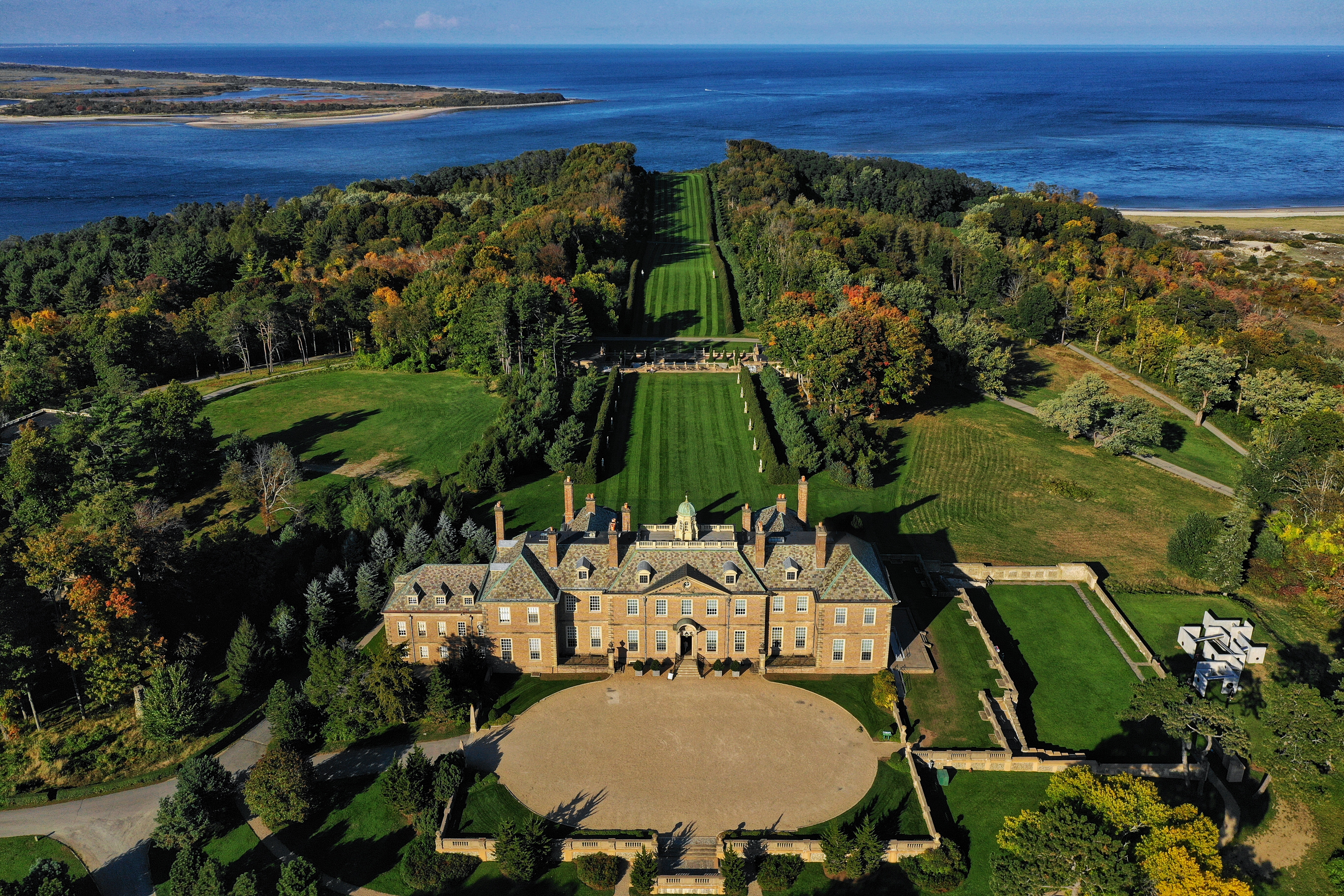
Castle Hill, completed in 1928

The Country Place Era was a period, from about 1890 to 1930, of American landscape architecture design during which wealthy Americans commissioned extensive gardens at their country estates, emulating European gardens that the Americans had seen in their travels abroad. Prime examples include Biltmore near Asheville, North Carolina, Woodlea in Sleepy Hollow, New York, and Castle Hill in Ipswich, Massachusetts. Landscape architects that were involved at Castle Hill included Charles Gillette, Frederick Law Olmsted, Charles Adam Platt, and Beatrix Farrand. Marian Cruger Coffin, an early female architect, was another participant, as was Ellen Shipman.

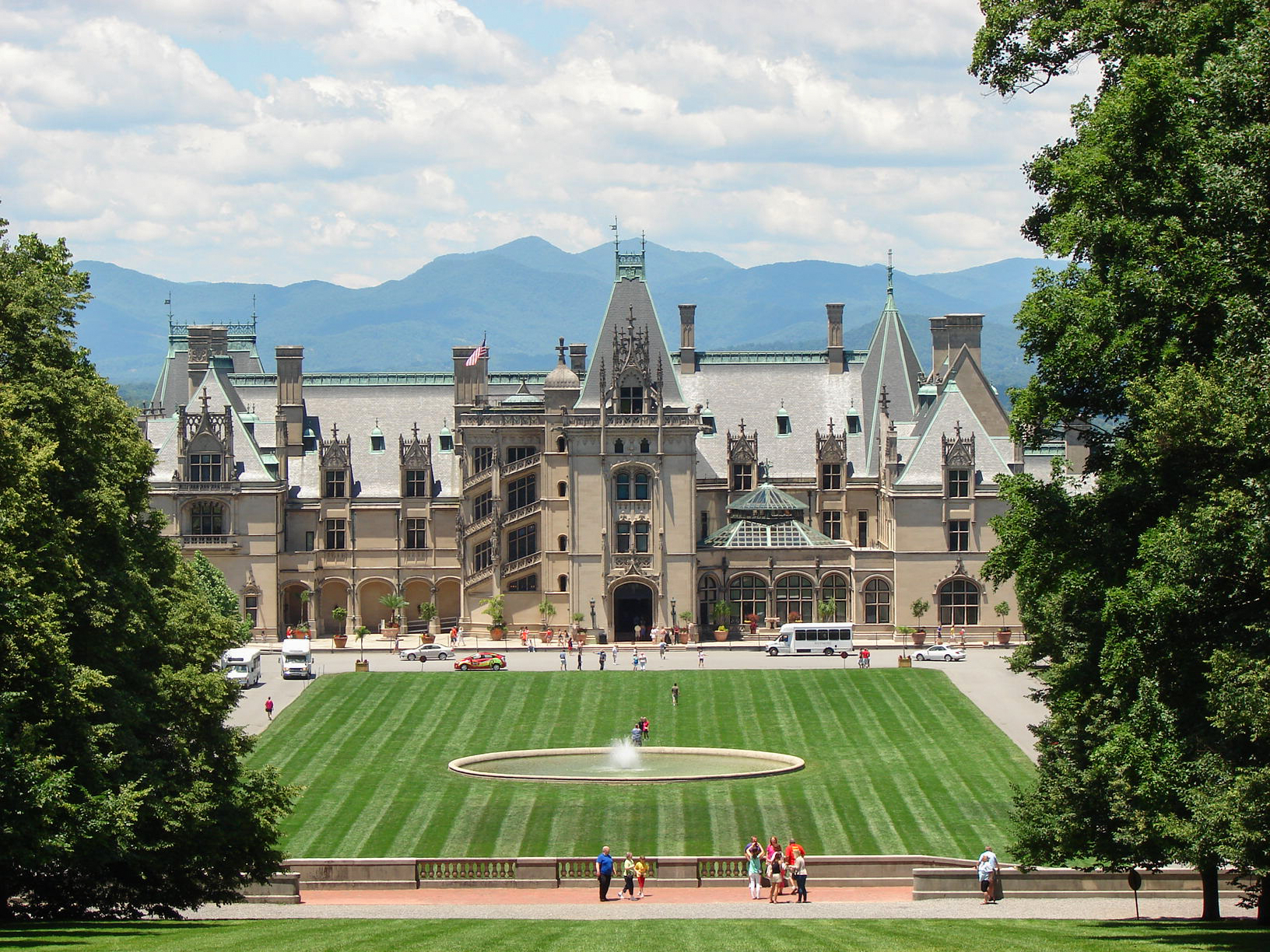
Biltmore, completed 1895

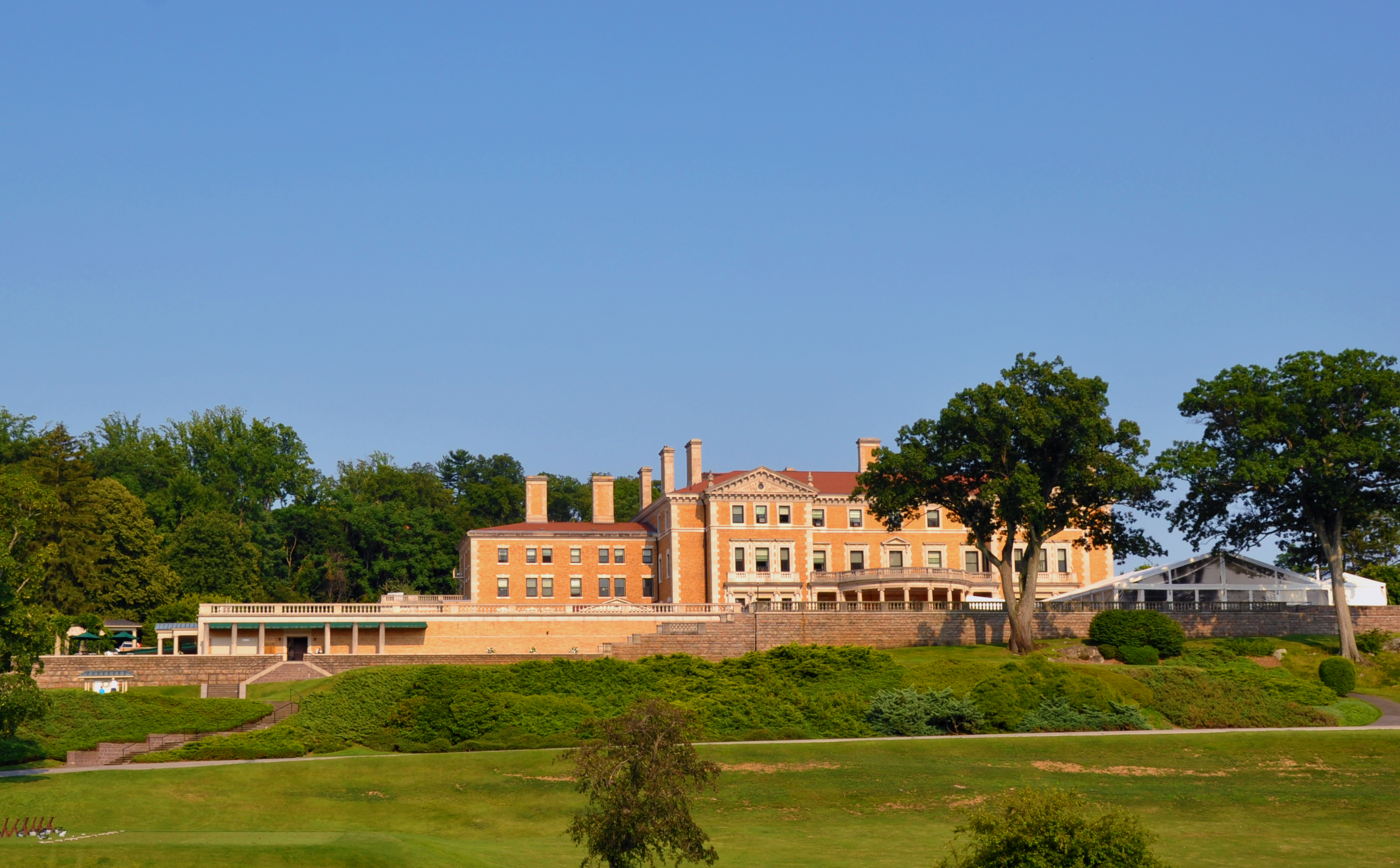
Woodlea's facade on the Hudson River, completed 1895

== See also ==
- Twin Bridges Rural Historic District, Pennsylvania
- Historic Country Estates in Lake County, Ohio
- Noerenberg Estate Barn in Orono, Minnesota
