= Marian Coffin =

American landscape architect (1876–1957)

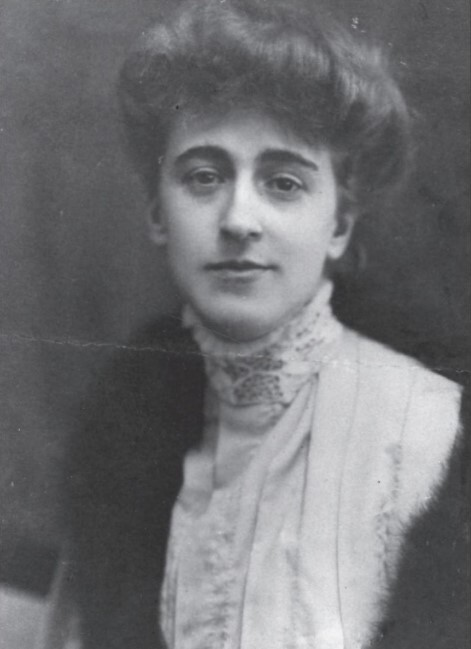
- 1904 portrait
- Born: September 16, 1876; Scarborough, New York, U.S.
- Died: February 2, 1957 (aged 80); New Haven, Connecticut, U.S.
- Education: Massachusetts Institute of Technology
- Occupation: Landscape architect
- Notable work: Gibraltar, Winterthur, and Caumsett gardens

Marian Cruger Coffin (September 16, 1876 – February 2, 1957) was an American landscape architect who designed gardens for members of the East Coast elite. As a child, she received almost no formal education but was home-tutored while living with her maternal relatives in upstate New York. Coffin was determined to embark on a career despite the social problems that it would cause for a woman of her class and enrolled at the Massachusetts Institute of Technology, where she studied between 1901–4 as one of only four women in architecture and landscape design.

After graduating Coffin was unable to find work with established architectural firms, due to widespread prejudice against a woman working in a male-dominated field. She set up her own practice in New York City in 1905, starting out by designing suburban gardens on Long Island. She was one of the first American women to work as a professional landscape architect. Her increasing fame led to larger commissions from wealthy and powerful East Coast families. By the 1920s she was one of the most sought-after landscape architects in the eastern United States. Coffin's clientele included some of the wealthiest and most famous families in the country, including the Fricks, the Vanderbilts, the Huttons, and the du Ponts.

Although the number of her commissions was greatly reduced after the onset of the Great Depression in 1930, she continued working almost until her death in 1957 at the age of 80. During her career she worked on over 130 commissions, including dozens of major estate gardens. Among her most notable creations were the gardens of Gibraltar in Wilmington, Delaware, the campus plan of the University of Delaware, the gardens of the Caumsett estate (now Caumsett State Historic Park), and the gardens of the Winterthur estate (now Winterthur Museum, Garden and Library).

== Early life ==
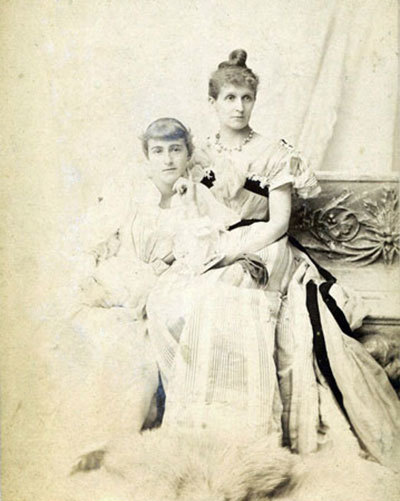
Coffin with her mother, Alice

Coffin was born into a wealthy upper-class family in Scarborough, New York, but grew up almost penniless due to the death of her father, Julian Ravenel Coffin, when she was seven. During her childhood years, Coffin and her mother, Alice (née Church), lived with relatives in Geneva, New York. She found the beautiful scenery of the area, set in the Finger Lakes of upper New York state, an inspiration; she later wrote, "even as a small girl, I loved the country, not so much gardens and growing things, for I had no experience with these ... but simply the great outdoor world."

Although the Coffins had little money, their life with Alice's upper-class relatives gave Marian an almost aristocratic upbringing that introduced her to high society on the East Coast and enabled her to make social connections that were to be extremely valuable in later life. However, she received almost no formal education, a deficiency that caused significant problems for her in her college years. She was instead tutored at home, where she also enjoyed the benefits of exposure to fine art and music and became an accomplished horse rider.

As a relatively impoverished member of the upper class, Coffin had no independent income and faced a choice between finding a rich husband or taking up a professional career. She chose the latter, despite the fact that (as noted by Martha Brookes Hutcheson, another early female landscape architect) "it was considered almost social suicide and distinctly matrimonial suicide, for a woman to enter any profession." She aspired to find a creative role but recognized the difficulties she faced, as she later wrote:

I secretly cherished the idea of being a great artist ... but that dream seemed in no way possible of realization ... [Although] my desire to create beauty was strong, I did not seem to possess talent for music, writing, painting or sculpture, at the time, the only outlet a woman had to express any artistic ability ... My artistic yearnings lay fallow until I realized it was necessary to earn my living.

== Studies ==
An architect friend suggested that she might like to try "landscape gardening" (the term used at the time for landscape architecture) a field in which Beatrix Jones Farrand had become a female pioneer during the 1890s. Coffin may also have been influenced by her uncle Benjamin Church, who had worked under Frederick Law Olmsted on the creation of Central Park in New York City. Women at the time were looking beyond the traditional female careers of school teacher, nurse and office clerk, but relatively few educational institutions admitted them to study in male-dominated fields such as architecture or horticulture. One of the exceptions was the Massachusetts Institute of Technology (MIT), which had begun admitting women in 1870, only nine years after its establishment. Coffin applied there but was initially refused entry, as she was not qualified to meet the admission requirements due to her lack of a formal education. However, several of the key faculty members were sympathetic and encouraged her to persevere. She undertook intensive tutoring in mathematics and enrolled at MIT in 1901 as a special student, one of four women enrolled on the architecture course and one of two studying landscape architecture. The four women on the course were the only female members of a 500-strong student body.

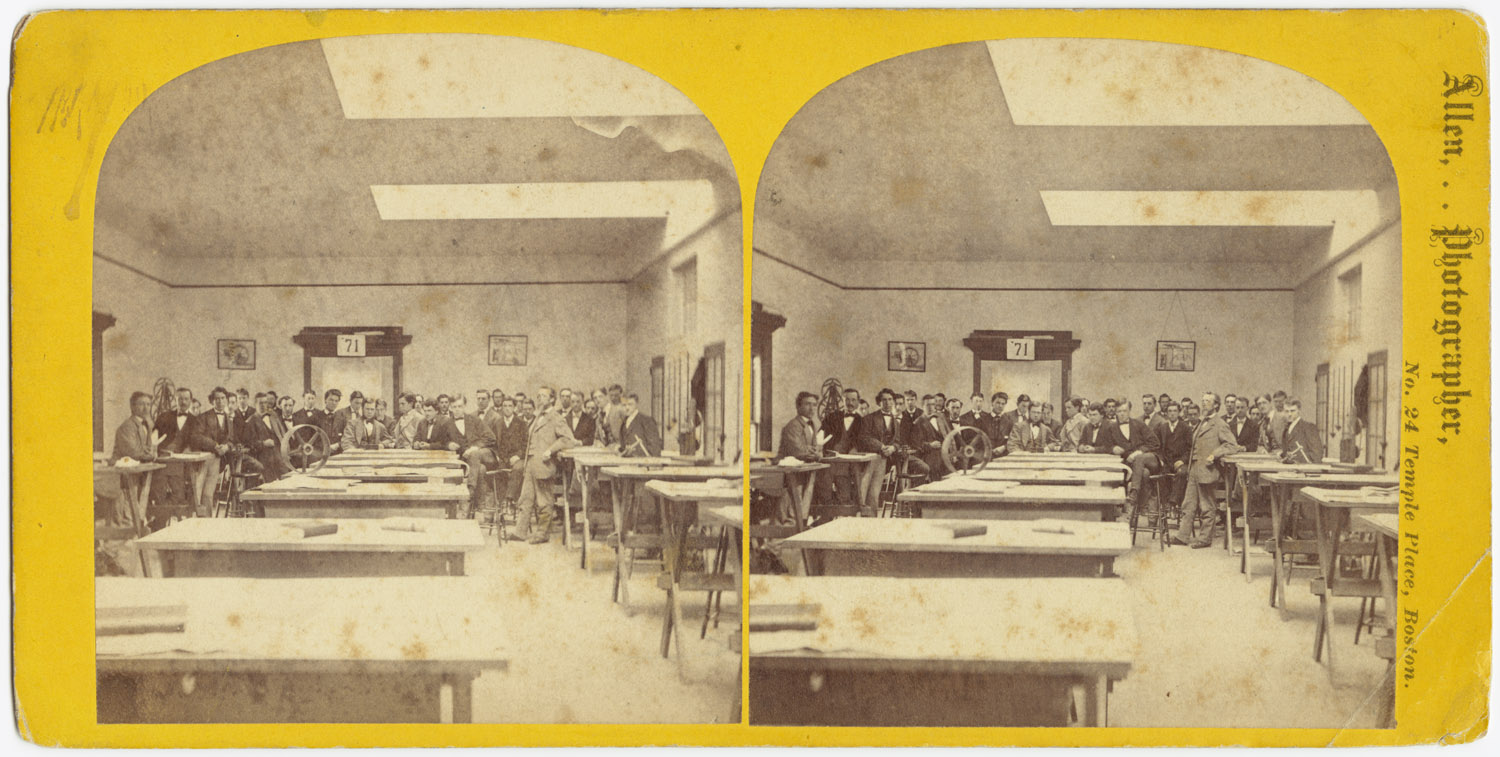
Stereographic card showing a mechanical drafting studio at MIT, where Coffin studied from 1901–4

Coffin took the full range of architectural courses including studying engineering, physics, maths, mechanical drafting and freehand drawing in addition to architectural and landscape design. She also studied botany and horticulture under Charles Sprague Sargent at the Arnold Arboretum. One of her formative influences at MIT was Guy Lowell, the director of the landscape design program there, who was an advocate of the classical values of balance, order, proportion and harmony taught by the French Ecole des Beaux-Arts. Lowell was best known for his book American Gardens, published in 1902, which influenced many landscape architects to adopt his principles to design symmetrical, axial gardens that combined architectural features with classical garden ornaments with vegetation, following the tradition of Italian villas.

Another major influence was Charles Platt, who also followed the Italian tradition of treating the house and gardens as complementary entities, designed as a whole as a series of indoor and outdoor "rooms". His 1894 book Italian Gardens was a major influence on Coffin's own designs and elements of his work can be recognised in gardens that she executed, such as the Gibraltar Gardens in Wilmington, Delaware. During her course, she spent a summer abroad studying landscape design in France and Italy, as well as going on field trips to study estates in the Boston area, including some designed by Platt. She particularly excelled at botany and became friends with a fellow student, Henry Francis du Pont, with whom she later collaborated to design the gardens of Winterthur, Delaware.

Coffin's college years were nonetheless a "long grind", as she described it, with a seemingly unrelenting "long routine of hard work" relieved only by her summer abroad. She and the other three women in the program maintained a friendly competition with the male students which, she said, "put us on our mettle to prove that we, too, were serious students and competitors. This association with many types of boys and men I found very helpful as we had a fine spirit of camaraderies in the drafting room and many a helping hand was given me at a critical moment, though one had to steel oneself to hear many a severe criticism, which was perhaps even more valuable."

== Early career ==
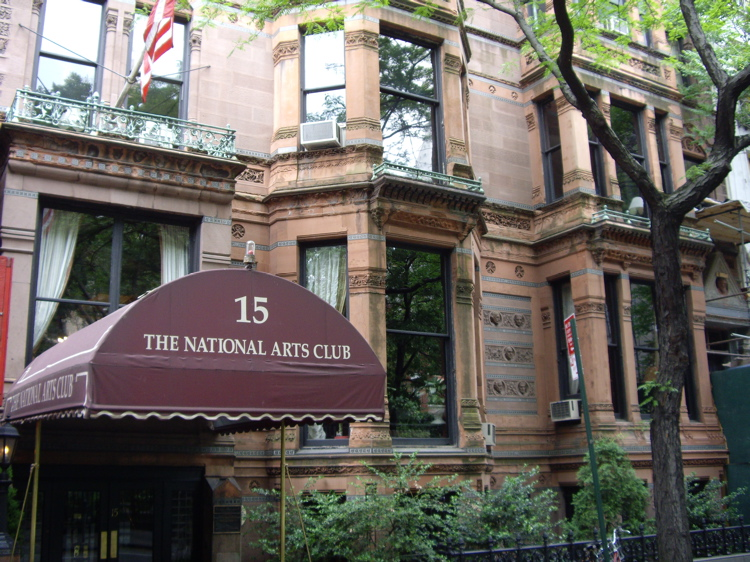
The National Arts Club in New York City, where Coffin lived with her mother from 1905–27

Coffin graduated in 1904 and travelled to Europe with her mother, visiting well-known gardens and staying with family and friends. Along the way she met Edith Wharton, Henry James and Gertrude Jekyll among others. Jekyll, an influential British horticulturist and garden designer, had a major influence on Coffin's subsequent work. On returning to America, Coffin found that the strongly male-dominated architectural firms were unwilling to employ a woman. She later wrote:

One expected the world to welcome newly fledged landscape artists, but alas, few people seemed to know what it was all about ... while the idea of taking a woman into an office was unheard of. 'My dear young lady, what will you do about supervising the work on the ground? [meaning the laborers].' [It] became such a constant and discouraging query that the only thing seemed to be for me to hang out my own shingle and see what I would do about it.

Coffin moved to New York City with her mother and took rooms in the National Arts Club in Gramercy Park, Manhattan. Around 1905, Coffin set up her own office at the National Arts Club and began taking commissions, using her family connections to find work. She was ideally situated; it was the height of the Country Place Era, when wealthy East Coast Americans were eager to develop elaborate European-style gardens for their estates. Coffin was well-connected in such circles, widely traveled, came from a good family, was professionally trained and was known for her good taste. She also joined the American Society of Landscape Architects, which had two other female members at the time.

Coffin's first jobs were to design small flower gardens such as the suburban garden she designed for Edward Sprague in 1906 in Flushing, Queens. Noted for its original design, it was situated on a modest lot measuring 150 feet by 300 feet (45 m by 91 m), typical of the new suburban developments being built on Long Island at the time. A few years later, she wrote about the Sprague garden in Country Life in America and Elsa Rehmann also discussed it in her 1918 book The Small Place: Its Landscape Architecture. Coffin argued that a "moderately well-to-do" homeowner could create and maintain a substantial and elaborate garden for a modest expenditure, comparable to that of a mid-range car. She promoted the idea that even the most featureless lot could be beautified through good design: "We certainly cannot create a magnificent view, but we can plan and plant beautiful screens and backgrounds that will be interesting at all seasons of the year. We may not easily be able to construct a picturesque diversity at ground level, but we can plant so as to have much height and variety in our flower and shrub groups."

As her fame grew, Coffin gained the opportunity to put her design principles into practice on a larger scale. Her practice had grown large enough for her to need an assistant by 1911, and by 1918 she had moved her office to larger premises at 830 Lexington Avenue. She also took on James Scheiner, an architect, as an associate. He became a key part of Coffin's practice, working on large-scale tasks such as overseeing work on the ground. This in turn opened up new opportunities for her to take on new, larger commissions. Coffin insisted on being paid the same fees as a male architect and to be treated equally in contracts; this was a novelty in itself, at a time when women were usually paid less than men. She also liked to employ women to work with her on commissions, giving them the chance to undertake apprenticeships that male prejudice had denied her when she had first started on her career.

== Inter-war career ==
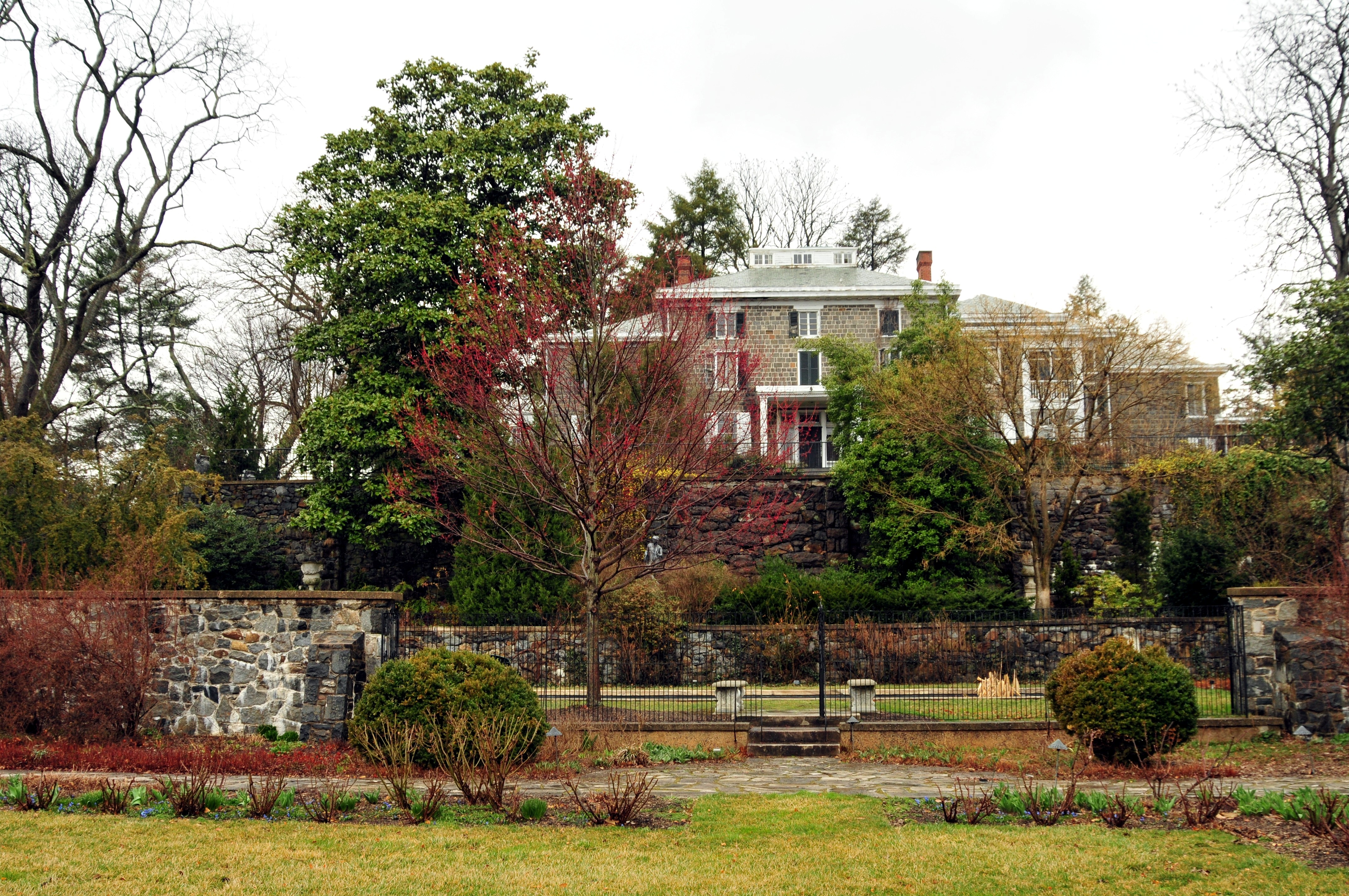
The gardens of Gibraltar (Wilmington, Delaware), designed by Coffin between 1916–23

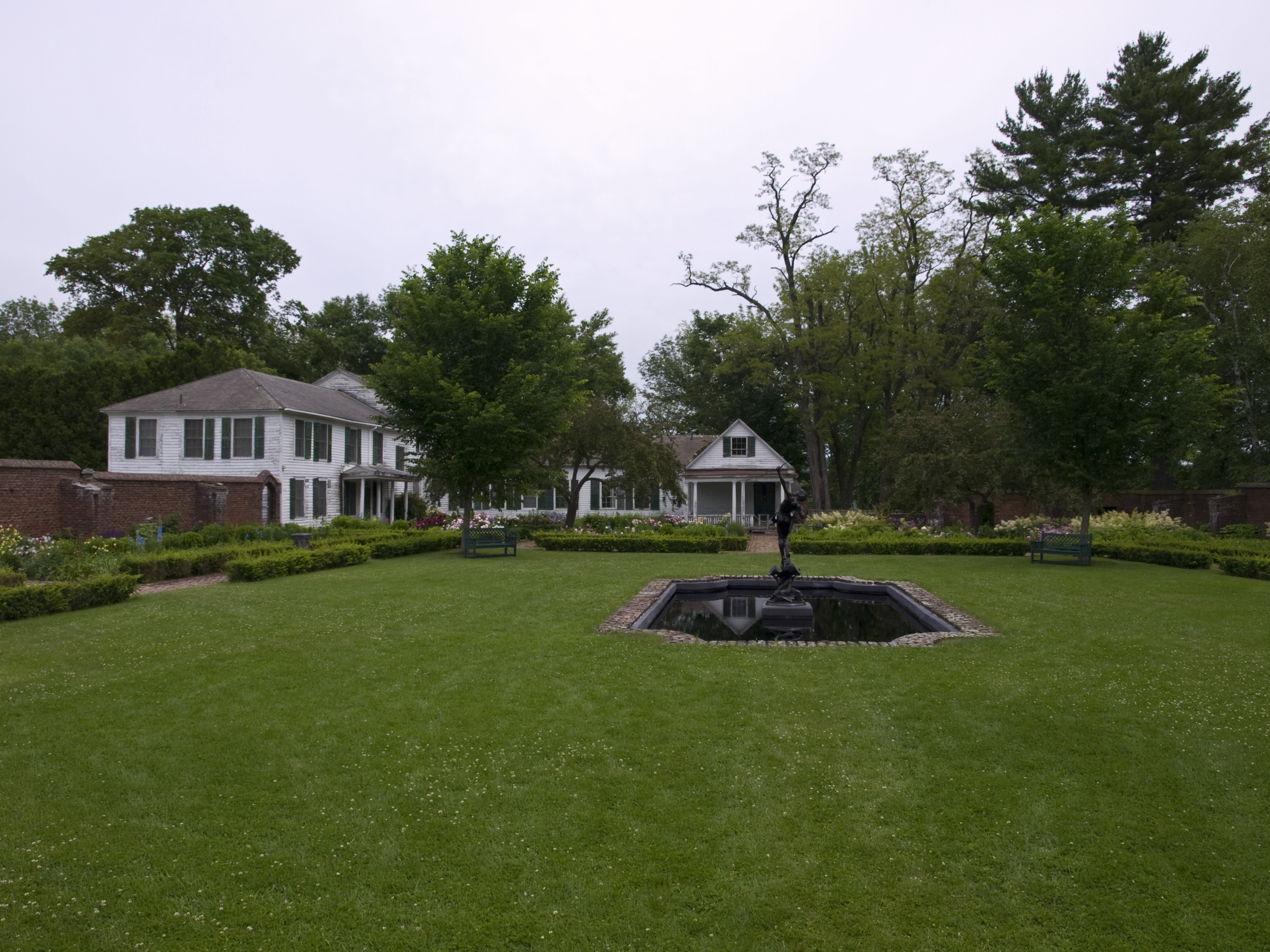
King's Gardens next to Fort Ticonderoga, 1921

Among Coffin's significant commissions during this period were the design of a garden for William Marshall Bullitt's Oxmoor estate in Glenview, Kentucky in 1909, probably due to a recommendation from Henry Francis du Pont. The Bullitt commission led to two similar commissions nearby in 1911. In 1910–11, she also designed gardens for Alfred Boardman in Southampton, New York and for her friend Elizabeth E. Farnum in Norfolk, Connecticut. A relative of the du Ponts, Hugh Rodney Sharp, gave her what was to become one of her best-known commissions in 1916, the creation of the gardens of the Gibraltar estate in Wilmington, Delaware. She designed it in an Italianate Beaux-Arts style as a series of "rooms" to parallel the layout of the mansion. It has a strongly geometric layout profusely planted in a style reminiscent of an informal English garden. Numerous architectural and decorative elements such as fountains, statues, urns and hand-forged iron gates provide additional ornamentation.

Coffin's attempts to find business in the Midwest were thwarted by the well-established presence there of several notable landscape architects in Chicago but she was not short of commissions despite this failure. Her success was recognized by her being elected a Fellow of the American Society of Landscape Architects in 1918, and by the 1920s she was one of the most sought-after East Coast landscape architects. Her work was widely featured in popular magazines and professional journals, at Coffin's own instigation as part of an overt marketing strategy. She sought to reach the wealthy and powerful women who made up an important part of the readership of publications such as the Garden Club of America's Bulletin. Coffin commissioned some of America's leading landscape photographers to take photographs of her creations and promoted her work through slide lectures. Her marketing was highly successful and led to a steady stream of commissions.

Most of her commissions were carried out during the 12 years or so between the end of the First World War and the start of the Great Depression. She took on several major projects, including designing the landscape of the University of Delaware campus in 1919 at the recommendation of Sharp, who chaired the college's Buildings and Grounds Committee. From 1918 to 1952, Coffin was appointed the University of Delaware's landscape architect, a position which required Coffin to unite the university's two separate campuses (the former Delaware College to the north and the Delaware Women's College to the south) into one cohesive design. This was a challenge since the linear mall design of each was out of alignment with the other. Coffin solved this problem by linking them via a circle instead of curving the straight paths (the university's library faces this circle today) which rendered the misalignment unnoticeable to the pedestrian.

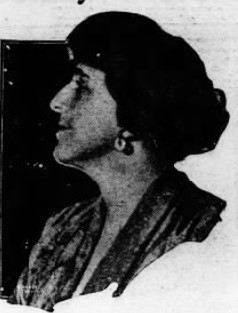
Coffin in 1925

Other major projects included gardens for the Bayberryland estate in Shinnecock Hills on Long Island, the Marjorie Merriweather Post estate known as Hillwood in nearby Brookville (which is now part of the Long Island University Post Campus) and the huge Caumsett estate (now Caumsett State Historic Park) on behalf of Marshall Field III. Two projects carried out in the late 1920s, for Edgar W. Bassick in Bridgeport, Connecticut and Joseph Morgan Wing in Millbrook, New York led to her being awarded the Gold Medal of Honor by the Architectural League of New York in 1930.

In 1926, Coffin fell ill with a serious hip infection that forced her to curtail much of her physical activity and required a lengthy stay in hospital. She moved to a newly acquired house in New Haven, Connecticut, although she continued to maintain her office in New York and commuted there daily. Coffin often entertained guests in New Haven (and recruited several Connecticut notables as new clients), holding teas, cocktail parties, musical events and buffet suppers. The garden, which she had laid out herself, became the site of garden parties in the summer months. She preferred the company of young architects, artists, musicians and writers, though she could be curt towards those she took a dislike to; on one occasion, she snubbed Hilaire Belloc when he asked her which of his books she had read.

== Later career and death ==
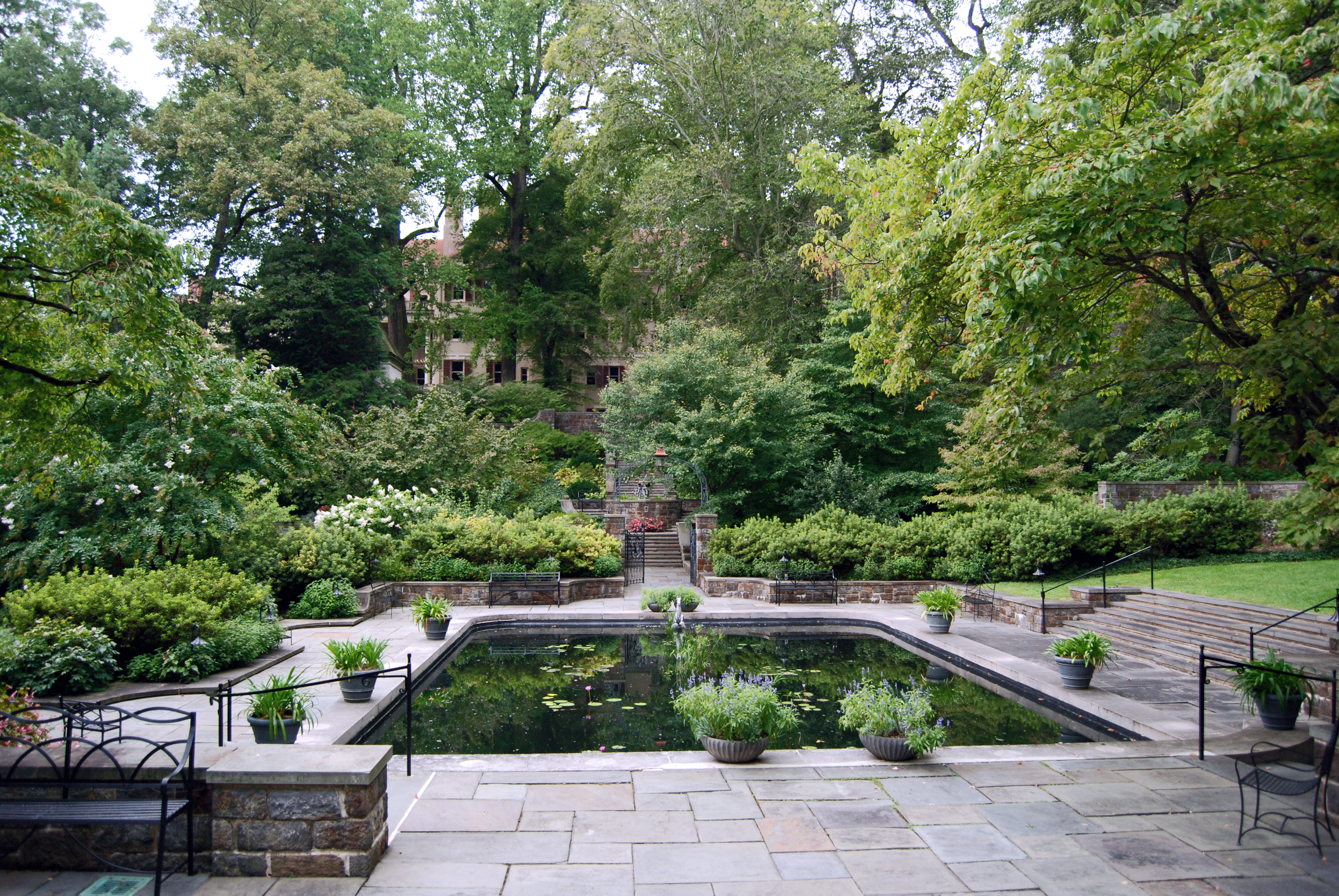
The Reflecting Pool at Winterthur, designed by Coffin for the du Ponts as their family swimming pool with a grand staircase leading down from the East Terrace

Coffin's designs were distinguished by her use of "dramatic contrasts in color, inclusion of wildflowers and woodland plantings, and site unity through effective transition spaces." She was especially noted for her ability to effectively incorporate functional areas such as tennis courts and putting greens with ornamental areas such as allées. Her willingness to innovate made her a particularly sought-after designer as clients came to value a more adventurous approach to landscape architecture. She put into practice the idea put forward in 1918 by Elsa Rehmann that a garden should be a "manifestation of distinctive individuality, an expression of personality." By the 1920s, Rehmann's views had become fashionable and gardens became seen as a vehicle for expressing the private self.

Many of Coffin's theories and principles can be seen in practice in her most famous creation, Henry Francis and Ruth Wales du Pont's gardens at their Winterthur estate. Her work on the gardens began in 1929 and became the biggest commission of her career. It was very fortuitously timed for her, as the Wall Street Crash of 1929 wiped out the fortunes of many of her clients and brought to an end the era of commissioning elaborate gardens for large country estates. Coffin had somewhat better luck with her investments and the enormous fortune of the du Ponts insulated the family from the worst of the Great Depression, permitting work on Winterthur to continue throughout the downturn. With the money from her investments and the fees from the du Ponts for the Winterthur commission, Coffin was able to maintain two homes, a maid and a chauffeur despite the general economic decline.

The Depression meant that large commissions became few and far between. For the rest of her career, Coffin had to make do with smaller and less well-compensated commissions for suburban gardens. She took up writing and produced two books, Trees and Shrubs for Landscape Effects (1940) and The Seeing Eye. The latter was completed but never published and the manuscript was lost after she died. After the Second World War, she carried out several more commissions and continued working on Winterthur until the 1950s. She designed layouts for the New York Botanical Garden in the Bronx and travelled extensively in Europe and South America in the late 1940s and early 1950s. She was awarded an honorary doctorate of letters from Hobart and William Smith Colleges in Geneva, New York in 1946. On February 2, 1957, she died at her home in New Haven. Perhaps fulfilling Martha Brookes Hutcheson's prediction that having a career would be "matrimonial suicide" for a woman of her class, Coffin never married and had no children. Her papers, architectural plans and photographs of her gardens are preserved at the Winterthur Museum, Garden and Library.

== Bibliography ==
- Doumato, Lamia (1988). Architecture and Women: A Bibliography. Garland Publishing. ISBN 9780824041052.
- Fleming, Nancy (1995). Money, Manure & Maintenance, Ingredients for Successful Gardens of Marian Coffin, pioneer landscape architect, 1876–1957. Country Place Books. p. 7. ISBN 9780964300309.
- Howett, Catherine M. (2007). A World of Her Own Making: Katharine Smith Reynolds Johnston And the Landscape of Reynolda. University of Massachusetts Press. ISBN 9781558495203.
- Karson, Robin S. (2007). A Genius for Place: American Landscapes of the Country Place Era. University of Massachusetts Press. ISBN 9781558496361.
- Libby, Valencia (2011). Louise A., Mozingo; Jewell, Linda L. (eds.). Women in Landscape Architecture: Essays on History and Practice. McFarland. ISBN 9780786461646.
- Pregill, Philip; Volkman, Nancy (1999). Landscapes in History: Design and Planning in the Eastern and Western Traditions. John Wiley & Sons. ISBN 9780471293286.
- Ralph, Mary Anna (May 31, 1995). "National Register of Historic Places Inventory/Nomination: Gibraltar". National Park Service.
