= Atherton (surname) =

- Pronunciation: /ˈæðərtən/ ADH-ər-tən
- Language: Middle English

Origin
- Meaning: "Aethelhere's town"
- Region of origin: Lancashire, England

Other names
- Variant forms: Aðerton or Aderton, De Atherton, Etherton, Athurtun, Addertone, Hatherton

Atherton is a toponymic surname. One origin is the town of Atherton, historically in Lancashire, England.

Atherton coat of Arms

== Notable individuals ==
=== A ===
- Adelbert S. Atherton, former American politician
- Alfred Atherton, former American Ambassador
- Alfred Bennison Atherton, Canadian physician
- Alice Atherton, American 19th century theatrical performer
- Amber Atherton, British entrepreneur
- Andrew Atherton, former principal and vice-chancellor of the University of Dundee
- Andrew Atherton (gymnast), British gymnast
- Archie Atherton, American parachutist
- Arlon S. Atherton, American Civil War veteran and politician
- Artie Atherton, American showman

=== B ===
- Billy Atherton, English footballer
- Brenda Atherton, England international lawn and indoor bowler

=== C ===
- Carol Atherton, British teacher and academic
- Candy Atherton, British journalist and politician
- Cassandra Atherton, Australian prose-poet, critic, and scholar
- Charles Atherton, British inventor and Civil Engineer
- Charles G. Atherton, U.S. Representative and Senator from New Hampshire
- Charles Henry Atherton, American architect and secretary of the U.S. Commission of Fine Arts
- Charles Humphrey Atherton, U.S. Representative from New Hampshire
- Charlie Atherton, American baseball player
- Christopher Atherton, Northern Irish footballer
- Claire Atherton, Franco-American film editor
- Cornelius Atherton, American steelmaker

=== D ===
- Dan Atherton, British racing cyclist
- David Atherton, British conductor and co-founder of the London Sinfonietta
- David Atherton (baker), English baker and health advisor
- David Atherton, British guitarist and mentor of The Wild Flowers
- Donny Atherton, American BMX racer

=== E ===
- Edwin Atherton, American law enforcement agent and private investigator
- Effie Atherton, Scottish actress
- Eleanora Atherton, English philanthropist
- Ella Atherton, Scottish actress
- Ella Blaylock Atherton, British-born American physician
- Lizzie Aiken née Atherton, American Civil War nurse
- Elizabeth Atherton, British lyric soprano
- Elizabeth Potts née Atherton, American; the only woman to be legally executed in the U.S. state of Nevada
- Ernest Atherton, Australian state level politician

=== F ===
- Faxon Atherton, American businessman
- Frank Atherton, British physician and Chief Medical Officer for Wales
- Frank Peabody Atherton, American composer and music instructor
- Frederick Atherton (1865-1936), American politician and writer

=== G ===
- G. F. A. Atherton, American politician
- Gee Atherton and Rachel Atherton, British mountain bike racers
- George W. Atherton, American educator, and former president of the Pennsylvania State University
- Gertrude Atherton, American writer
- Gibson Atherton, American politician; former Representative from Ohio
- Gordon Atherton, English footballer

=== H ===
- Hacia Atherton, Australian CEO
- Henry B. Atherton, US Civil War veteran, and lawyer
- Henry L. Atherton, American businessman and diplomat
- Henry F. Atherton, American businessman
- Henry Valpey Atherton, American lawyer, part of the Nuremberg Trials
- Henry Vernon Atherton, American professor and pioneer in the dairy industry
- Hope Atherton, colonial clergyman of the 17th century
- Horace H. Atherton, Massachusetts politician
- Howard Atherton, British cinematographer
- Major General Humphrey Atherton, early settler of Massachusetts Bay Colony

=== J ===
- Jack Atherton, English footballer
- James Atherton (founder of New Brighton), a British merchant and the founder of New Brighton
- James Atherton (settler), early settler in New England
- James Atherton (photographer), American news photographer
- James Atherton, English actor
- James Atherton (footballer, born 1872), English footballer
- James Atherton (footballer, born 1875) who played for Preston North End
- James Atherton (tenor) (1943–1987), American tenor
- Jason Atherton, English chef
- Jeptha Atherton, former American politician and Revolutionary War soldier
- Jim Atherton, Welsh footballer
- John Atherton (died 1573), English politician
- John Atherton, Anglican Bishop of Waterford and Lismore in the Church of Ireland
- John Atherton (died 1617), English politician
- John Atherton (pioneer), British-born Australian pioneer
- John Carlton Atherton, American 20th century artist
- John McDougal Atherton, American distiller and politician
- John W. Atherton, American writer and academic
- Joseph Ballard Atherton, American businessman and philanthropist in the 19th century
- Joshua Atherton, former American anti-slavery campaigner
- Julie Atherton, British actress

=== K ===
- Keith Atherton, American baseball player
- Kevin Atherton, British Irish Manx artist

=== L ===
- Lewis Eldon Atherton, American academic and author
- Lionel Edwards Atherton, Chilean engineer and politician

=== M ===
- Mabel Louisa Dean Paul (1872-1919), English socialite known as Mabel Atherton, by marriage to Colonel Thomas Atherton.
- Margaret Atherton, American philosopher and feminist historian
- Mary Chandler Atherton, American educator and textbook author
- Maurice Atherton, British Army officer and ceremonial officer in the County of Kent, England
- Mike Atherton, English cricketer, former member and captain of the England team
- Michael Atherton (musician), Australian musician and composer
- Minna Atherton, Australian competitive swimmer

=== N ===
- Nancy Atherton, American author
- Nicholas Atherton, 14th-century English knight, MP for Lancashire
- Nigel Atherton, British magazine editor
- Noel Atherton, British cartographer

=== P ===
- Paul Atherton, British entrepreneur
- Paul Atherton, British television producer
- Paula Atherton, American saxophonist
- Percy Lee Atherton, American composer
- Peter Atherton, a Massachusetts colonial leader
- Peter Atherton (footballer), English footballer
- Peter Atherton (manufacturer), British designer of instruments, inventor, and manufacturer of textile machinery
- Peter Lee Atherton, American businessman, property developer, investor, and politician
- Phil Atherton, English curler

=== R ===
- Rachel Atherton, British racing cyclist; sister of Dan Atherton and Gee Atherton
- Ray Atherton, U.S. Diplomat who served as the first United States Ambassador to Canada (1943–48)
- Ralph Atherton
- Richard Atherton, Member of Parliament for Liverpool
- Ro Atherton, Royal Air Force officer
- Robert Atherton (poet), English poet from Lancashire
- Robert Atherton (civil servant), British colonial official in Ceylon
- Robert C. Atherton, magazine editor
- Robert "Bobby" Atherton, Welsh footballer who died in the First World War
- Robert Atherton Edwin, New Zealand meteorologist and weather forecaster

=== S ===
- Samuel Atherton, U.S. politician from Massachusetts
- Sarah Atherton, British Conservative Member of Parliament (MP) for Wrexham
- Simon Atherton, former American 19th-century Shaker
- Sonia Wieder-Atherton, Franco-American classical cellist
- Steve Atherton, former South African rugby union player

=== T ===
- Tammy Ealom (Tamaira Jane Atherton), guitarist, vocalist, and principal songwriter for the indie rock band Dressy Bessy
- Ted Atherton, Canadian actor
- Terence Atherton, British intelligence officer
- Thomas H. Atherton, American architect
- Tommy Atherton, English footballer
- Tim Atherton, Australian baseball player
- Tony Atherton, American saxophonist and member of Bazooka (band)

=== V ===
- Venie Atherton, American actress and theatrical performer
- Viopapa Annandale-Atherton, Samoan doctor

=== W ===
- Walter Atherton (architect), American architect
- Walter Atherton (footballer), English footballer
- Warren Atherton, former American attorney and national commander of The American Legion
- William Atherton (minister), English Wesleyan minister
- Sir William Atherton (politician), British barrister and Liberal Party politician
- William Atherton, American actor
- William Atherton (mayor of Preston), British politician
- William Atherton (plantation owner), British slaveowner
- William H. Atherton, Canadian writer and educator
- William Atherton (soldier)

=== People with "Atherton" as a middle name ===
- Abby Kent-Means
- Aline Atherton-Smith
- Bruce Atherton Smith
- Caroline Atherton Mason
- Charles Atherton Brown
- Charles Atherton Cumming
- David Atherton-Smith
- Ebenezer Atherton Hunt
- Florence Atherton Spalding
- George Atherton Aitken
- Henry Atherton Frost
- Horace Atherton Jackson
- James Atherton Tilden
- Jeremy Atherton Lin
- Jesse Atherton Bynum
- Joseph Atherton Gilman
- Mary Atherton Richards
- Pauline Atherton Cochrane
- Paul A. Kennon
- Robert A. Bakeman
- Robert Atherton Edwin
- Robert Atherton Rawstorne
- Robert Vernon Atherton Gwillym
- Thomas Atherton Powys
- Uriah Atherton Boyden
- Walter Hussey
- William Atherton du Puy

== Fictional characters ==
- Bill Atherton in 1978 film Damien: Omen II
- Geoffrey Atherton in American TV series Mad Men, Season 4, Episode 12 "Blowing Smoke"
- Dr James Atherton in 1990 film Arachnophobia
- Lucia Atherton in 1974 film The Night Porter

== See also ==
- Atherton (disambiguation)
