= James Atherton (disambiguation) =

James Atherton (born 1987) is an English actor.

James Atherton may also refer to:

- James Atherton (settler) (c. 1624–1710), emigrated to the New England Colonies in 1635
- James Atherton (died 1879) (1819–1879), 19th century Massachusetts businessman
- James Atherton (footballer, born 1872) (1872 – after 1895), English footballer
- James Atherton (footballer, born 1875) (1875–1923), English footballer
- James Atherton (founder of New Brighton) (1770–1838), English property developer
- James Atherton (photographer) (1927–2011), American news photographer
- James Atherton (tenor) (1943–1987), American tenor and artistic director
- Jim Atherton (James Geoffrey Atherton, 1923–2010), Welsh professional footballer
