= Robert Atherton =

Robert Atherton may refer to:

- Robert Atherton (poet) (1861–1930), English poet
- Robert Atherton (civil servant), British colonial official
- Bobby Atherton (1876–1917), Welsh footballer
- Robert C. Atherton (1908–1986), American author, publisher, and businessman

== See also ==
- Robert Atherton Edwin (1839–1911), New Zealand meteorologist
- Robert Rawstorne (Robert Atherton Rawstorne, 1824–1902), archdeacon of Blackburn, 1885–1899
- Robert Vernon Atherton Gwillym (c.1741–1783), British country landowner and politician
