= William Atherton (disambiguation) =

William Atherton (born 1947) is an American actor.

William Atherton may also refer to:

- William Atherton (mayor of Preston), (c.1705–1745)
- William Atherton (minister) (1775–1850), Wesleyan minister
- William Atherton (politician) (1806–1864), Scottish barrister and politician
- William Atherton (plantation owner) (1742–1803), English merchant and plantation owner
- William Atherton (soldier) (1793–1863), Kentucky rifleman and veteran of the War of 1812
- William H. Atherton (1867–1950), Canadian writer, historian, academic and scholar
- Billy Atherton (1905 – 1976), English footballer
