= Robert Atherton (poet) =

English poet (1861-1930)

Robert Atherton (1861–1930) was an English poet. During his lifetime he was referred to as The Ploughman Poet.

== Early life ==
Atherton was the son of Robert Atherton and Ellen Hesketh. He was born in 1861 in Kirkby, Lancashire. At the time Kirkby was a small farming village. It has since developed into a busy suburb of Liverpool.

He spent his youth as a ploughboy but later took holy orders at St Aidan's College, Birkenhead. He allegedly taught himself Hebrew, Latin and Greek.

== Career ==
In 1888 Atherton became Rector of St Dunstan's parish church in Bolnhurst, in rural Bedfordshire, a post he occupied for 15 years.

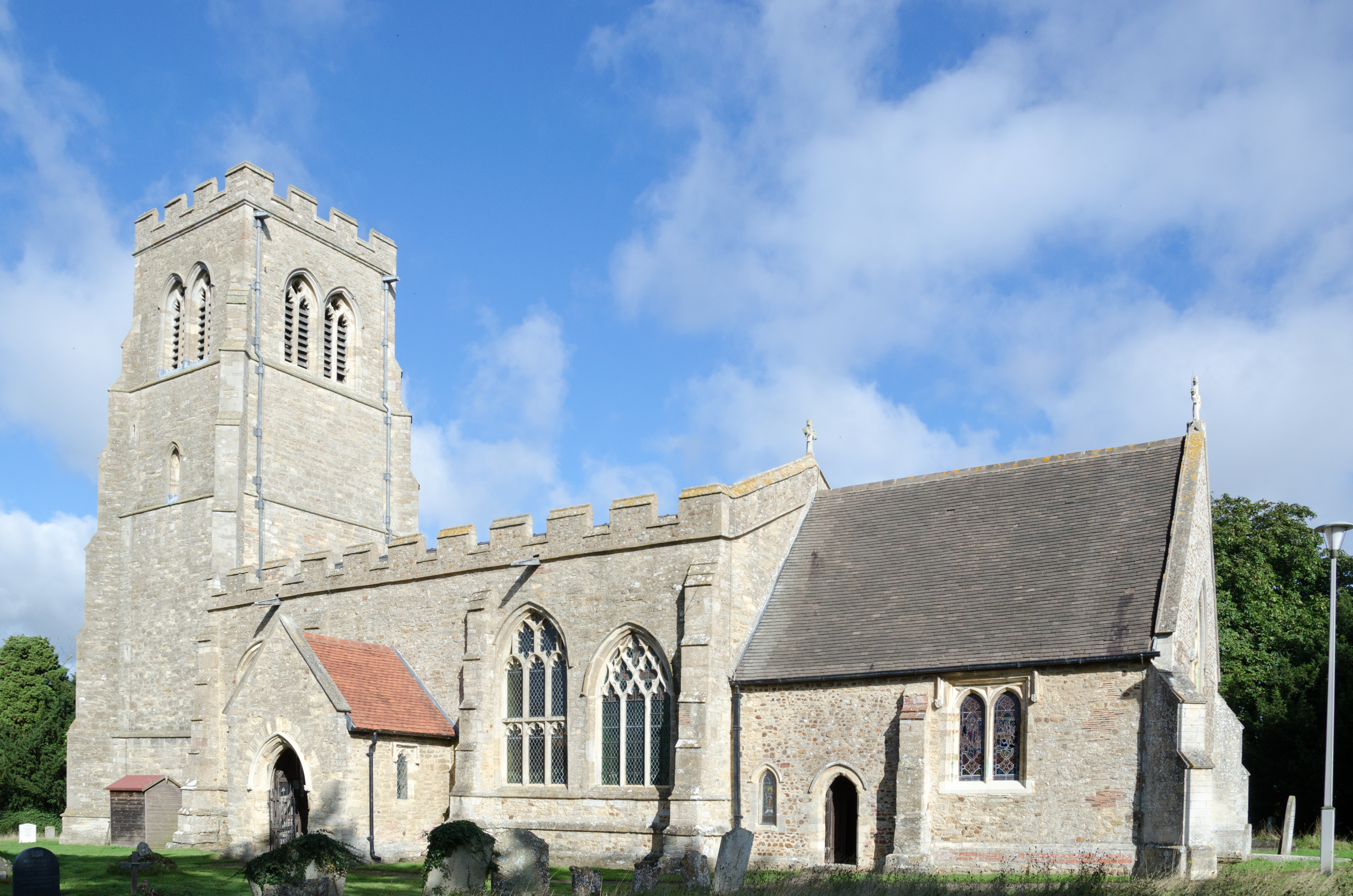
St Dunstans Church, Bolnhurst

During this time he began writing what became an extensive collection of verse which caused some to regard him as the 'Lancashire Burns', in reference to Scottish poet Robert Burns. Atherton acquired the nickname 'Robin O' Bobs', along with a reputation as an eccentric. He sometimes used the pseudonym Rupert Upperton.

The church establishment believed Atherton to be unsuited to a role in the clergy, and eventually he was removed from his position in what had become his adopted rural community, and left the Anglican church in 1904.

He later described his departure from the church as being due to middle class hypocrisy.

Atherton became a 'wandering poet', living for a time in Birmingham and Manchester, before returning to his native Kirkby to live at Pear Tree Farm, where he resided until his death in 1930.

He is buried in the churchyard of St. Chad's, Kirkby parish church.

The library of the Merseyside Maritime Museum has four copies of his poems that refer to the sinking of the RMS Titanic and the RMS Empress of Ireland. Knowsley Archives has preserved an audio recording on SoundCloud of Atherton reciting his poem about the doomed passenger ship, Titanic.

Atherton's poetic themes included nature, the countryside, and emigration by sea. Some of his work was perceived by contemporaries to be well-crafted, echoing themes similar to those of fellow poet Richard Church.

== Personal life ==
Atherton married Ada Annie Banks in Northampton on 6 December 1887. They had two children, and divorced in 1896.

His eviction from his role at Bolnhurst having deprived him of his living, and of his home, which had been provided by the parish, Atherton contested the loss of his position in society. He died in poverty, spending his final years living in an outbuilding on his grandnephew's farm.

== Ancestry ==
He a direct descendant of Gawain Atherton. His distant Atherton relatives include the American historian Lewis Eldon Atherton, politician, Gibson Atherton; and Welsh footballer, Bobby Atherton and English footballer, Tommy Atherton.

== List of works ==
- Village Life and Feeling. Songs and poems. Greening & Co., 1901; 2nd edn, 1907 (1st edition published under the pseudonym "Rupert Upperton"; the 2nd edition appeared under his real name)
- The hymn of the Christmas version
- Poems of Friendship and Sympathy. Ancoats Printing Works, 1914
- When the Robin Sings and other verses. London 1924 (published under the pseudonym "Robin O'Bobs")
- From Plough to Parsonage: My Life's Story. No date, privately printed

== Sources ==
- Swann, John Randall, 1924. Lancashire Authors: Series of Biographical Sketches. St. Anne's on Sea: Robertson (printer)
- Local History: Kirkby - photograph
- Public Libraries: titles of poems
