= Atherton High School =

Atherton High School may refer to:

- Atherton High School (England), a secondary school in Atherton, Greater Manchester, England
- Atherton High School (Kentucky), a high school in Louisville, Kentucky, United States
- Atherton State High School, a high school in Atherton, Queensland, Australia
- Menlo-Atherton High School, a high school in Atherton, California, U.S.

== See also ==
- Atherton (disambiguation)
