= Billy Atherton =

English footballer (1905–1976)

Personal information
- Full name: William Jackson Atherton
- Date of birth: 4 May 1905
- Place of birth: Bradford, England
- Date of death: 1976 (aged 70–71)
- Position: Inside forward

Senior career*
Years	Team	Apps	(Gls)
1923–1924	Idle		
1924–1928	Manningham Mills		
1928–1931	Bradford (Park Avenue)	36	(20)
1931–1934	Doncaster Rovers	54	(21)
1934–1935	Halifax Town	15	(2)
1935–1936	Preston North End	0	(0)
Total		105	(43)
- * Club domestic league appearances and goals

William Jackson Atherton (4 May 1905 – 1976) was an English footballer who played in the Football League for Bradford (Park Avenue), Doncaster Rovers and Halifax Town .

== Personal life ==
He married Marjorie Cure in Bradford in 1933. They had two children.

== Ancestry ==
He a direct descendant of Gawain Atherton. His distant Atherton relatives include the American historian Lewis Eldon Atherton and politician, Gibson Atherton. He is related to Bobby Atherton and Tommy Atherton.
