= Oscar Newman =

Oscar Newman may refer to:

- Oscar Newman (architect) (1935–2004), architect and city planner known for his defensible space theory
- Oscar W. Newman (1867–1928), jurist in Ohio, United States
