= Atherton =

Atherton may refer to:

== People ==
- Atherton (surname), includes a list of notable people with the surname
- Atherton Blight (1834–1909), American lawyer, diarist, and philanthropist who traveled extensively in the middle of the 19th century to Europe and the Middle East
- Atherton D. Converse (1877–1956), American politician
- Atherton Curtis (1863–1843), American art collector and art historian who lived in France
- Atherton Martín, Dominican agronomist and environmentalist
- Atherton Rawstorne (1855–1936), British Bishop of Whalley
- Atherton Seidell (1878–1961), American chemist and library scientist
- Atherton Thayer, sheriff of Norfolk County, Massachusetts from 1794 to 1798

== Places ==
=== Australia ===
- Atherton, Queensland, a town on the Atherton Tablelands of Far North Queensland
- Atherton Tableland, a fertile plateau in Queensland
- Shire of Atherton, a former local government area of Queensland on the Atherton Tableland

=== Canada ===
- Atherton, Ontario, a hamlet in Norfolk County, Ontario
- Mount Atherton, a mountain in Yukon

=== Malaysia ===
- Ladang Atherton, part of the electoral district N.31 Bagan Pinang, Port Dickson

=== United Kingdom ===
- Atherton, Greater Manchester, town in Wigan district, historically in Lancashire, England
  - Atherton (ward), electoral ward
  - Atherton Urban District, local government district from 1863 until 1974
  - Atherton High School, Greater Manchester, mixed secondary free school
- Atherton Line, section of the Manchester-Southport Line, between Wigan and Salford
  - Atherton railway station
  - Atherton Bag Lane railway station, a former station

=== United States ===
==== California ====
- Atherton, California, a town in San Mateo County in the San Francisco Bay Area
  - Atherton station, a former station on the Caltrain railway line in this town

==== Hawaii ====
- Atherton Field, home of the Hawaii Pacific Sharks

==== Indiana ====
- Atherton, Indiana, an unincorporated community in Vigo County
- West Atherton, Indiana

==== Kentucky ====
- Athertonville, Kentucky, former home of Atherton pre-prohibition whiskey
- Atherton High School, Louisville, public school in Louisville, Kentucky

==== Missouri ====
- Atherton, Missouri, an unincorporated community in Jackson County

=== Elsewhere ===
- Atherton Islands, off Antarctica
- Atherton Peak, South Georgia

== Science ==
- Atherton–Todd reaction, in organic chemistry
- Jiles–Atherton model, magnetic hysteresis model

== Sports ==
- Atherton F.C., a former English association football team based in Atherton, Greater Manchester
- Atherton Laburnum Rovers F.C., an English association football team based in Atherton, Greater Manchester.
- Atherton Collieries A.F.C., an English association football team based in Atherton, Greater Manchester.
- Atherton Roosters, a Cairns, Queensland Rugby team

== Other uses ==
- Atherton: The House of Power, a book by Patrick Carman
- USS Atherton, a 1943 World War II Cannon class destroyer escort
