= Walter Atherton =

Walter Atherton may refer to:

- Walter Atherton (architect) (1863–1945), American architect
- Walter Atherton (footballer), English footballer
