= Roger Hicks =

Roger Hicks may refer to:

- Roger Hicks (author), author of photography and cook books
- Roger Glanville-Hicks, Australian rock musician
