= Mary Richards (disambiguation) =

Mary Richards is the main character of the American TV sitcom The Mary Tyler Moore Show.

Mary Richards may refer to:

- Mary A. E. Richards (1885–1977), Welsh botanist
- Mary Bowser, née Richards, Union spy during the American Civil War
- M. C. Richards (Mary Caroline Richards, 1916–1999), American poet, potter, and writer
- Mary Jane Richards (1843–1904), British theatre actress
- Mary Lea Johnson Richards (1926–1990), American heiress, entrepreneur, and Broadway producer
- Mary Richards (cricketer), English cricketer
- Mary Atherton Richards (1869–1951), American educator, clubwoman, and philanthropist

== See also ==
- Mary Richard (1940–2010), Aboriginal activist and politician in Winnipeg, Manitoba, Canada
- Richards (surname)
