= Sigma 24mm F1.4 DG HSM Art =

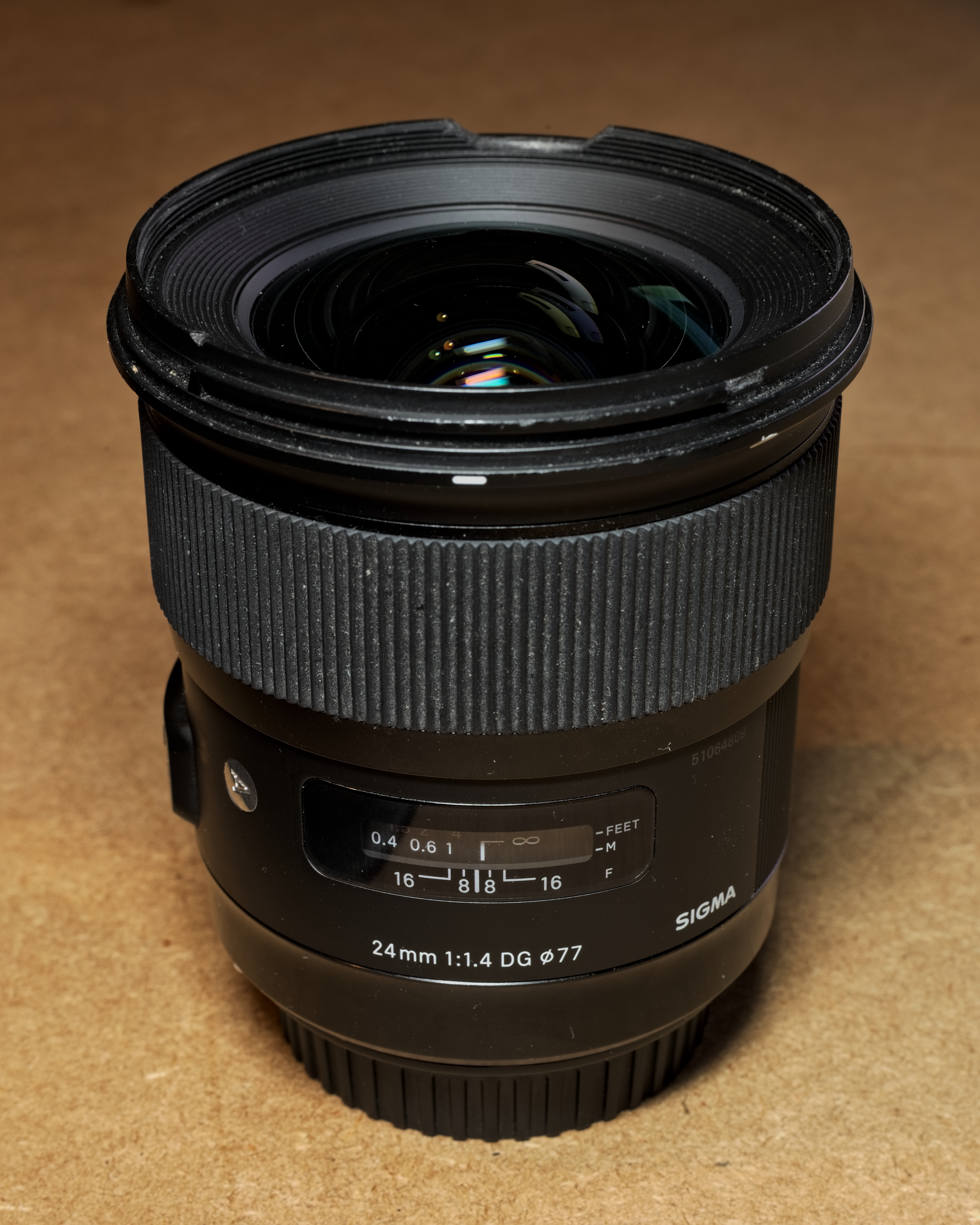
- Maker: Sigma
- Lens mount(s): Canon EF, Nikon F (FX), Sigma SA

Technical data
- Type: Prime
- Focus drive: Ultrasonic
- Focal length: 24mm
- Aperture (max/min): f/1.4
- Close focus distance: 0.25 metres (0.82 ft)
- Diaphragm blades: 9
- Construction: 15 elements in 11 groups

Features
- Manual focus override: No No
- Weather-sealing: No No
- Lens-based stabilization: No No
- Aperture ring: No No

Physical
- Max. length: 90 millimetres (3.5 in)
- Diameter: 85 millimetres (3.3 in)
- Weight: 665 grams (1.466 lb)
- Filter diameter: 77mm

History
- Introduction: 2015

The Sigma 24mm F1.4 DG HSM Art is an interchangeable wide angle lens for full frame cameras. It was announced by Sigma Corporation on February 10, 2015. A full two stops faster than most 24mm primes, it is designed to capture wide angle imagery with shallow depth of field, as one might with a medium or large format camera.

A review by LensTip gave the lens high praise in all aspects except coma, vignetting and autofocus speed, while Amateur Photographer highlighted its sharpness and "smooth, attractive rendition of out-of-focus regions".
