= William T. Spear =

American judge

William Thomas Spear
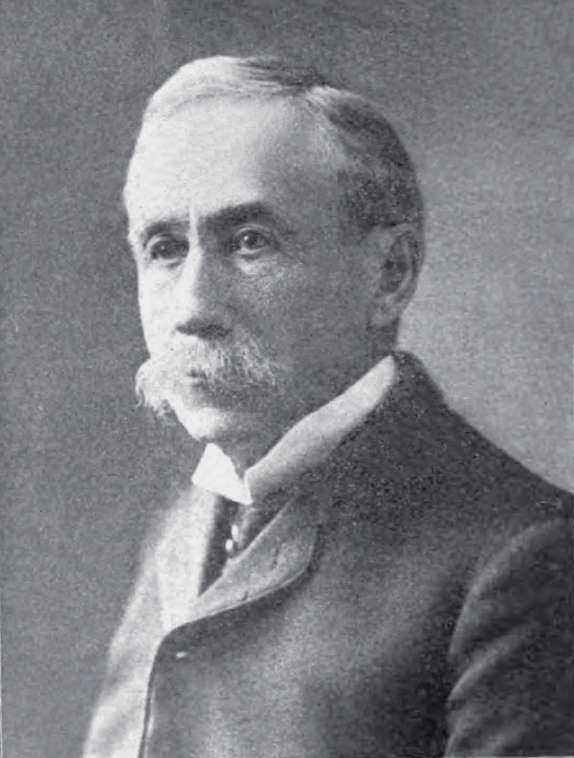

Justice of the Ohio Supreme Court
- In office December 16, 1885 – December 31, 1912
- Preceded by: Gibson Atherton
- Succeeded by: Oscar W. Newman

Personal details
- Born: June 3, 1834 Warren, Ohio
- Died: December 8, 1913 (aged 79) Columbus, Ohio
- Resting place: Oakwood Cemetery, Warren, Ohio
- Party: Republican
- Spouse: Frances E. York
- Children: four
- Education: Harvard Law School

William Thomas Spear (June 3, 1834 – December 8, 1913) was a Republican politician in the U.S. State of Ohio who was a judge on the Ohio Supreme Court 1885–1912.

== Biography ==
William T. Spear was born at Warren, Trumbull County, Ohio, attended public schools and learned the printing trade, apprenticing at the Trumbull Whig and Transcript, published at Warren. He was a compositor at the New York Herald, and then a proofreader at Appletons. He returned to Warren. He was a deputy Probate Judge and deputy County Clerk while studying law under Jacob Dolson Cox. He finished his education and graduated from Harvard Law School in 1859.

Spear returned to Warren and was admitted to the bar in 1859. He was associated first with Cox and Robert Ratliff, and later with John C. Hutchins and C. A. Harrington. He spent three years in Louisiana associated with a cotton plantation. He was elected Prosecuting Attorney of Trumbull County in 1871 and 1873, and City Solicitor of Warren in 1873 and 1875, all the while in practice with C. A. Harrington. In 1878 he was elected to the Court of Common Pleas, and re-elected in 1884.

In 1885, Spear was nominated by the Republicans to fill the un-expired term on the Ohio Supreme Court of John W. Okey, and defeated Democrat Gibson Atherton, who had been appointed to fill the seat for a few months. Atherton resigned in December that year, and Spear was appointed to fill the seat in the Interim. He won a full five-year term in 1887, and several more, serving until the December 31, 1912.

Judge Spear was married September 28, 1864 to Frances E. York of Geneva, New York, or perhaps Lima, New York. She taught at the Warren High School, and had four sons. Spear died less than a year after retiring at his home in Columbus, Ohio on December 8, 1913. He was buried at Oakwood Cemetery in Warren.

== Notes ==
Legal offices
Preceded by Gibson Atherton	Associate Justice of the Ohio Supreme Court; 1885–1912	Succeeded by Oscar W. Newman
