= James E. Robinson =

American judge (1868–1932)

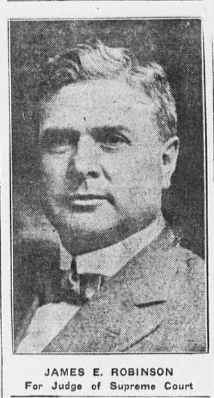
- Robinson in 1918

Associate Justice of the Ohio Supreme Court
- In office January 1, 1919 – January 27, 1932
- Preceded by: Oscar W. Newman
- Succeeded by: Will P. Stephenson

Personal details
- Born: James Edgar Robinson; August 15, 1868 Union County, Ohio
- Died: January 27, 1932 (aged 63) Columbus, Ohio
- Resting place: Marysville, Ohio
- Party: Republican
- Spouse: Lula Dell Flickinger (m. 1893)
- Relations: Barbara Bush (granddaughter); George W. Bush (great-grandson)
- Children: 4
- Education: Ohio Wesleyan University; Ohio State University College of Law

James Edgar Robinson (August 15, 1868, near Marysville, Ohio – January 27, 1932) was an American lawyer who served as an Associate Justice of the Ohio Supreme Court from 1919 to 1932. He was the maternal grandfather of First Lady Barbara Bush and matrilineal great-grandfather of George W. Bush.

== Life and career ==
Robinson was son of John W. Robinson (1831–1920, younger brother of James Wallace Robinson) and his wife Sarah Coe (1831–1901). Robinson was educated at the local high school and latter attended Ohio Wesleyan University 1886 to 1889, studied law with his uncle, and at Ohio State University College of Law from 1892 to 1893. At the latter he was a member of the first law class. He began the practice of law in Richwood, Ohio in 1893, relocating to Marysville eventually. At the turn of the century he was elected prosecuting attorney of Union County, he served in this capacity for six years. Robinson continued the practice of law until 1915, when Governor Willis appointed him an appellate judge in the Court of Appeals. In the 1916 election he was defeated in the Democratic landslide. In 1919 he was elected to the Supreme Court of Ohio. He was elected to a second term in 1925, and a third in 1930, but he died two years into the term.

== Death ==
He died after a short illness, January 27, 1932. His funeral was at his home, with Robert R. Reed of the Indianola Presbyterian Church officiating. He was buried at the family cemetery in Marysville.

== Family ==
Robinson married Lula Dell Flickinger on May 31, 1893. They had 4 children. Lula was very rarely at home, hiring a governess to manage her kids while she was away and causing James to be the primary parent in his children's lives.

Robinson is a sixth cousin once removed of British Prime Minister Winston Churchill, and is an ancestor (maternal great-grandfather) of George W. Bush. His daughter, Pauline Robinson, was the mother of First Lady Barbara Bush, and the mother-in-law of President George H. W. Bush.
