= Fortuna Bay =

Bay in South Georgia

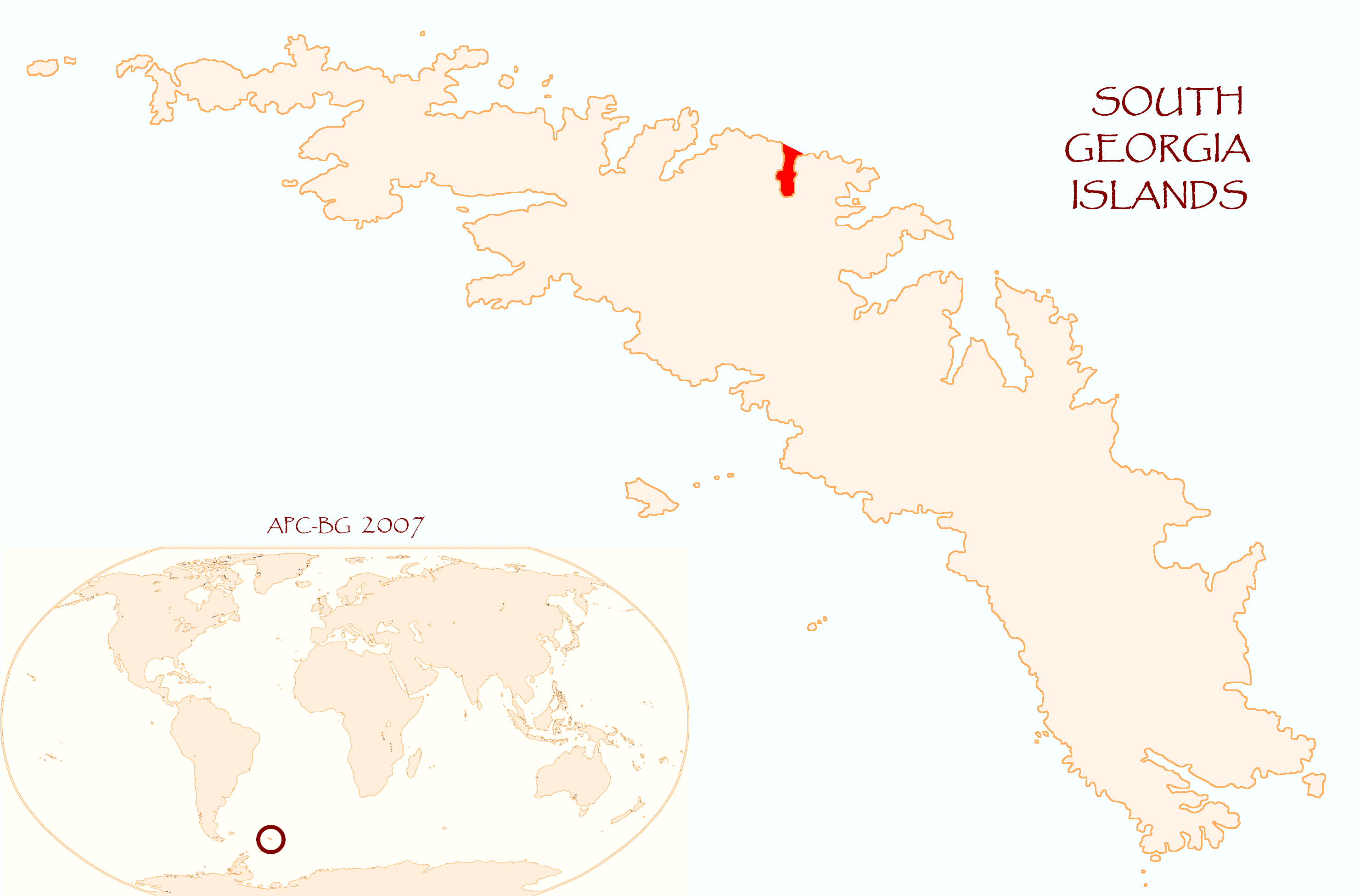
Location of Fortuna Bay on South Georgia Island

Fortuna Bay (54°07′S 36°48′W) is a bay 3 miles (5 km) long and 1 mile (1.6 km) wide. Its entrance is defined by Cape Best on the west and Robertson Point to the east, near Atherton Peak on the north coast of South Georgia. It was named after the Fortuna, one of the ships of the Norwegian–Argentine whaling expedition under C.A. Larsen which participated in establishing the first permanent whaling station at Grytviken, South Georgia, in 1904–05. The Second German Antarctic Expedition (SGAE) under Wilhelm Filchner explored Fortuna Bay in 1911–12. Discovery Investigations (DI) personnel charted the area during their 1929–30 expedition.

Ocean Harbour, 22 miles (35 km) to the southeast, was formerly known as "New Fortuna Bay", but its name was changed in order to avoid confusion with Fortuna Bay.

== Named features ==
Numerous features on and around Fortuna Bay have been named and charted by various Antarctic expeditions and research groups.

The west side of Fortuna Bay's entrance is marked by Cape Best, whose name dates back to at least 1912. Just southeast of the cape on the same coast is Illusion Point. Just over 3.7 kilometres (2.3 mi) south of Cape Best sits Anchorage Bay, charted by DI personnel and named because it provides good anchorage. On the south side of Anchorage Bay sits Peruque Point. Whistle Cove lies at the southwest end of Fortuna Bay. Further southwest, not on the bay itself, Breakwind Ridge rises 860 m (2,820 ft) high.

The east side of Fortuna Bay's entrance is marked by Robertson Point, a name that was established at least as far back as 1920. It sports a small knoll known as The Bump, charted and named by DI personnel. A small group of rocks called the Fortuna Rocks extend across the east side of the bay entrance, first charted by the SGAE. Small Bay indents the shore on the east side of Fortuna Bay. One kilometer (0.62 mi) south of Small Bay is Hodson Point.

Illusion Point, Peruque Point, and Whistle Cove on the west side, and Small Bay and Hodson Point on the east side were all first charted on a 1931 British Admiralty chart.
