= Breakwind Ridge =

Ridge in the United Kingdom

Breakwind Ridge (54°9′S 36°50′W) is a prominent rocky ridge which is 2 nautical miles (4 km) long in a north–south direction and rises to 860 metres (2,820 ft), close southwest of the head of Fortuna Bay on the north coast of South Georgia. The name "Breakwind Range" was likely applied by Discovery Investigations personnel who mapped Fortuna Bay in 1929–30. Following a resurvey by the South Georgia Survey, 1951–52, the descriptive term was altered to "ridge", which is more suitable for this relatively small feature. The name suggests a beneficial function of this ridge in protecting anchorages at Fortuna Bay from violent southwest and westerly winds.
