= Best Peak =

Mountain in South Georgia

Best Peak (54°7′S 36°49′W) is a peak, 600 metres (2,000 ft) high, standing southwest of Illusion Point, Fortuna Bay, on the north coast of South Georgia. The name appears to be first used on a 1931 British Admiralty chart.
