= Carol Atherton =

British English teacher and writer

Carol Atherton is an English teacher who has written "on the teaching of English Literature, curricular reform and the nature of disciplinary knowledge".

== Life and work ==
Atherton is from Merseyside. She graduated with a degree in English from St Edmund Hall, Oxford, gained a PGCE at Manchester Metropolitan University, and a PhD at the University of Nottingham in 2003.

Atherton has taught English since 1996 and is currently Head of English at Spalding Grammar School in Lincolnshire. She was made a Fellow of the English Association in 2009. She has written "on the teaching of English Literature, curricular reform and the nature of disciplinary knowledge".

== Personal life ==
She is an adoptive parent.

== Publications ==
- Defining Literary Criticism: Scholarship, Authority and the Possession of Literary Knowledge, 1880–2002. Macmillan, 2005. ISBN 978-1403946799.
- Teaching English Literature 16–19: an Essential Guide. Routledge, 2013. With Andrew Green and Gary Snapper. ISBN 978-0415528238.
- Reading Lessons: the books we read at school, the conversations they spark and why they matter. Fig Tree, 2024. ISBN 978-0241629482.
