= Atherton Peak =

Mountain in South Georgia

Atherton Peak (54°7′S 36°45′W) is a peak rising to about 500 metres (1,600 ft) east of Fortuna Bay, South Georgia. It was charted by Discovery Investigations, 1929–30, and named after Noel Atherton, cartographer in the Admiralty Hydrographic Office at the time, later chief Civil Hydrographic Officer, 1951–62.
