= Jack Atherton =

English footballer

Personal information
- Date of birth: 1917
- Place of birth: Preston, England
- Date of death: 1961 (aged 43–44)
- Height: 5 ft 8 in (1.73 m)
- Position: Inside right

Senior career*
Years	Team	Apps	(Gls)
1936	Preston North End	4	(1)
1938	Brighton & Hove Albion	9	(2)
- * Club domestic league appearances and goals

John James Atherton (1917–1961) was an English footballer who played in the Football League for Brighton & Hove Albion and Preston North End. He was born in Preston, England. He died in 1961.
