= Paul A. Kennon =

American architect

Paul Atherton Kennon Jr.
- Born: January 27, 1934; Shreveport, Louisiana, US
- Died: January 8, 1990 (aged 55); Houston, Texas, US
- Education: Texas A&M University; Cranbrook Academy of Art
- Occupations: Architect and Professor
- Spouse: Helen Ross Kennon (married 1957)
- Children: Two children

Paul Atherton Kennon Jr. (January 27, 1934 – January 8, 1990), was an American architect, a fellow of the American Institute of Architects (AIA) and Dean of the School of Architecture at Rice University, Texas, US.

A native of Shreveport in northwestern Louisiana, Kennon studied for his undergraduate degree at Texas A & M University, followed by earning a Master's degree at Cranbrook Academy of Art, Michigan. He worked for seven years as a designer for architect Eero Saarinen (He won an Eliel Saarinen Memorial Fellowship that enabled him to study at the Cranbrook Academy.)

Kennon was recruited to Rice University as associate director of the School of Architecture and a teaching faculty member. He became dean of the architecture school in September 1989. A few months later, he died suddenly in 1990 of a heart attack.

In 1967, he returned to work with the architectural practice, Caudill, Rowlett, Scott, headed by his mentor William W. Caudill, for whom he had worked during his college vacations. He became a design principal and then president of the company. The projects for which he was responsible won a number of awards.

== Family ==
Kennon was the son of Paul Atherton Kennon Sr. (1910-1986), a native of Tangipahoa Parish in South Louisiana, and the former Gladys Bookout (1910-2001), originally from Shreveport. The couple divorced. A college graduate, his mother for years was executive secretary at Arkansas-Louisiana CITGO.

About 1945, Gladys Kennon married Taylor W. O'Hearn of Shreveport. In 1964, when blacks were still mostly disenfranchised in Louisiana, O'Hearn was elected at-large from Caddo Parish as a state representative. He was one of two Republicans elected that year, the first to serve in the state house since Reconstruction. The other was also elected at-large from Caddo Parish.
