= Amateur Photographer =

British photography magazine

- Cover of the 140th Anniversary Issue (October 2024)
- Editor: Nigel Atherton
- Categories: Photography
- Frequency: Fortnightly (Tuesday)
- Circulation: 13,673 (ABC Jan – Dec 2015); Print and digital editions.
- First issue: 10 October 1884
- Company: Kelsey Media
- Country: United Kingdom
- Language: English
- Website: amateurphotographer.com
- ISSN: 0002-6840

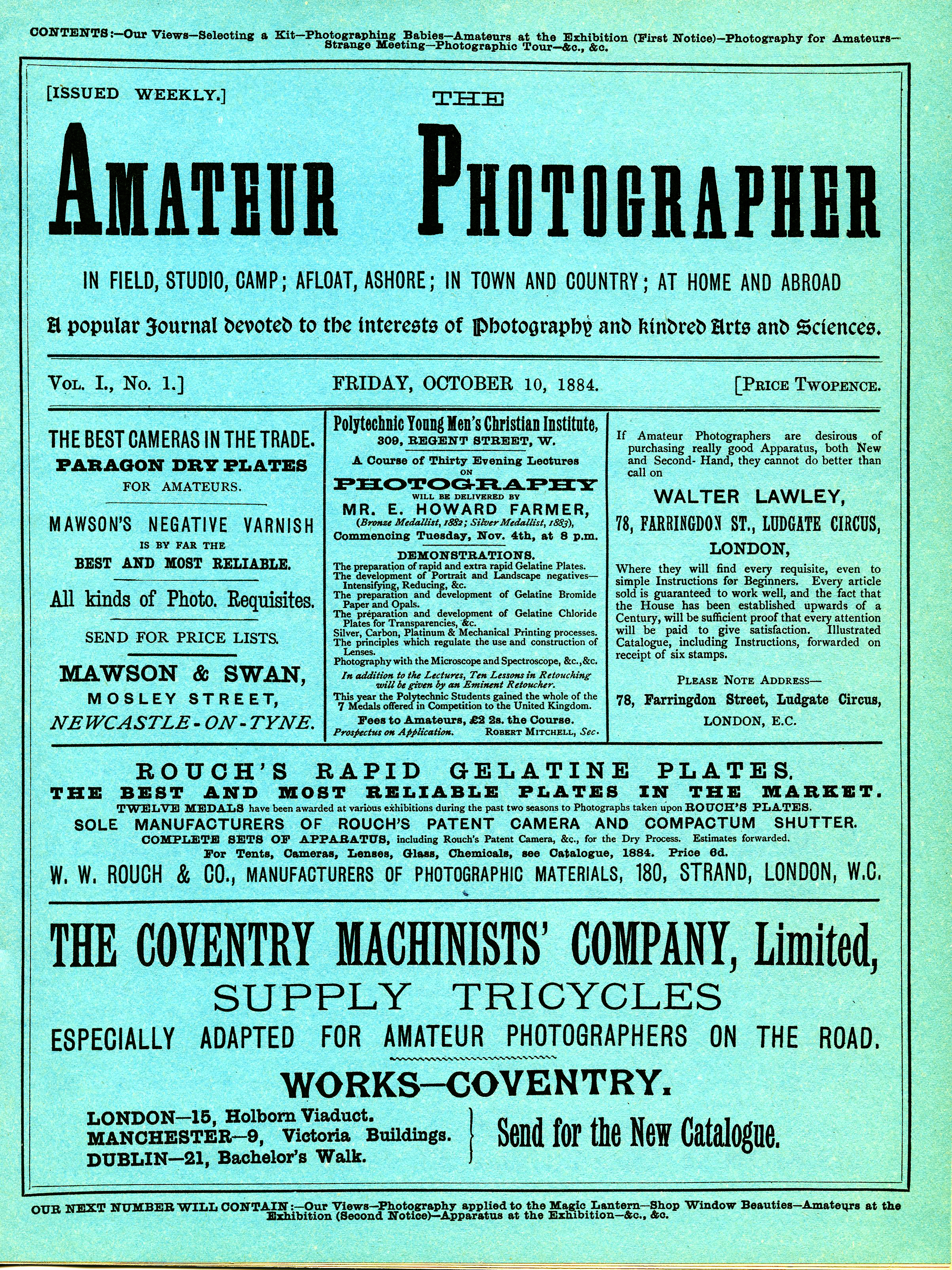
The Amateur Photographer, Vol 1, No 1, front cover

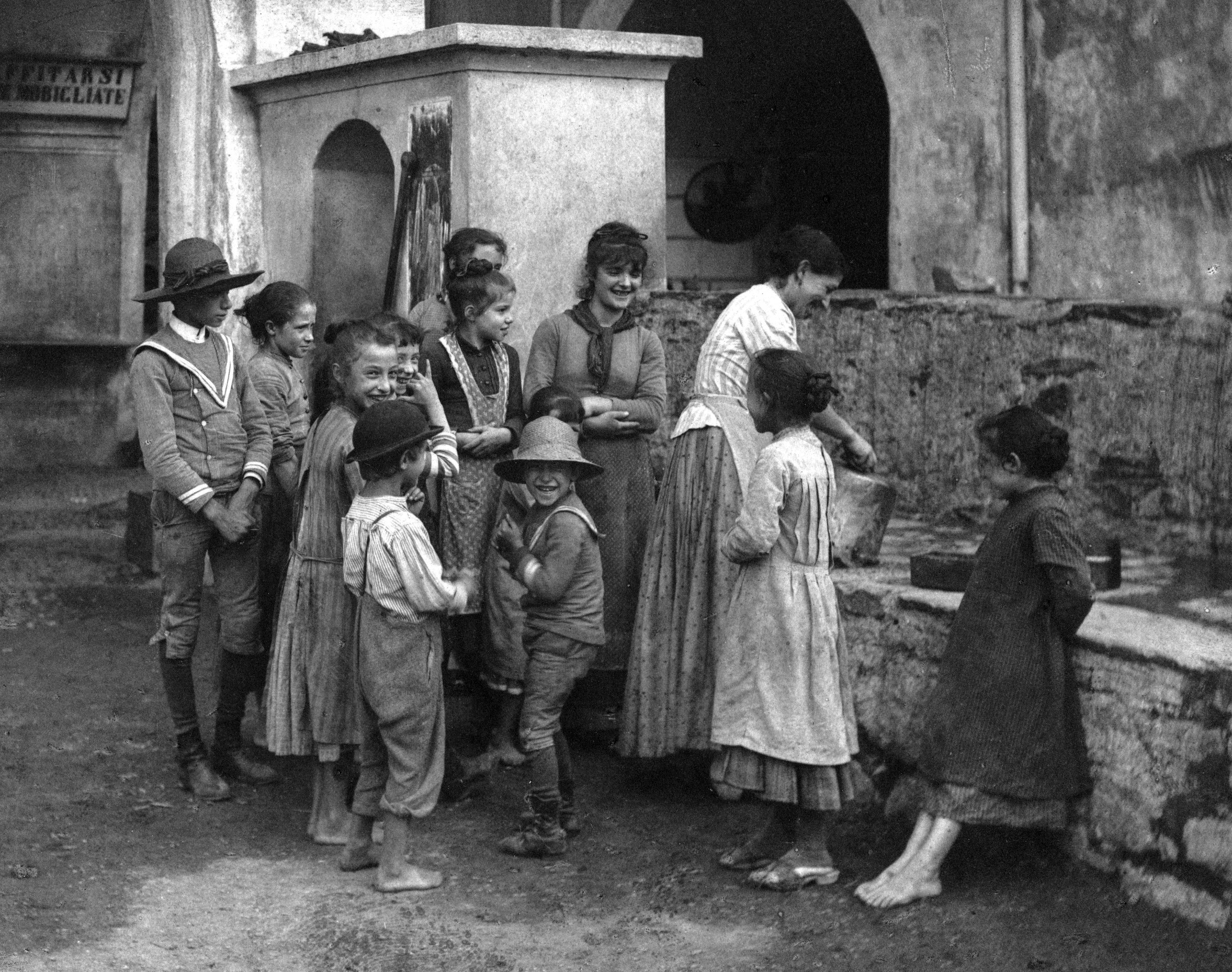
Alfred Stieglitz's The Last Joke (also known as A Good Joke), Bellagio, won first place in the Amateur Photographer's "Photographic Holiday Work Competition", appearing in the 25 November 1887 issue.

Amateur Photographer is a British photography magazine, published fortnightly by Kelsey Media. The magazine provides articles on equipment reviews, photographic technique, and profiles of professional photographers.

== About the magazine ==
Amateur Photographer was first published on 10 October 1884 by Hazell, Watson and Viney, making it over 140 years old. It has established itself as the world's number one weekly photography magazine. Some of the most renowned photographers such as Alfred Stieglitz, Frank Meadow Sutcliffe, David Bailey and Bob Carlos Clarke have written for the magazine over the years.

This magazine is now owned by Kelsey Media which acquired it (with World Soccer) from Future plc (owner of competing titles Digital Camera and Digital Photographer) after Future acquired TI Media, the previous owner of the magazine.

Starting with the 5 May 2026 issue, the magazine moved to a fortnightly schedule, with each edition expanded to 100 pages. The change came in response to reader feedback and coincided with the publication's first redesign in twelve years, which brought a new logo, updated cover layout, and a switch to a staple-free, higher-quality print format.

== Regular features ==
AP (as it is referred to) is usually based around the following items:

- AP News - information on the world of film and digital photography; including details of product launches, external competitions and upcoming events (festivals, events, galleries and camera clubs).
- Letters - Readers letters concerning recent events, views on photography and feedback on AP articles. Sponsored by Fujifilm UK, film or digital media is provided for all letters published.
- Photo Insight - Each feature sees a photographer explain the ideas and techniques behind a particular photograph.
- Reader Spotlight - Readers photographs. Readers can submit up to 10 photographs (not needing to be themed) on film or digital media. A selection of these is published regularly. Each 'Editor's Choice' contribution is paid £50.
- AP's Icons of Photography - A camera, photograph, photographer or other notable figure from photographic history.
- AP Test Bench - AP's tests of the latest photography equipment.
- Ask AP - Technical help in response to readers letters and emails.
- Vendor Adverts/Classifieds - A wide selection of UK and international equipment vendors (some offering preferential rates to AP readers); and AP's own classified ads for readers to submit.
- Final Analysis - Authored by Roger Hicks for 21 years until he passed away in 2019. Now written by guest contributors.

== Amateur Photographer of the Year (APOY) ==
APOY is an annual competition run by Amateur Photographer, and is open to hobbyists, defined for the purposes of the competition as those whose photography is a hobby and not a main source of income.

Each year's competition is hosted on Photocrowd and run over ten rounds, with each round having a dedicated "theme" for the images to adhere to. The APOY judges then narrow the entries down each round, and the top ten are published in the magazine, with the top three places being awarded prizes donated by this year's sponsors. All scoring photographers are entered into the league table, which is updated after each round. After all ten rounds, the photographer with the highest score in the league table is crowned the Amateur Photographer of the Year and wins £1,000 to spend at Park Cameras, plus a £100 voucher for Bob Books. There is also a category for entrants aged 13 to 21 and an award for camera clubs.

== Staff, contributors and notable ex-staff ==
=== Current staff ===
- Editor: Nigel Atherton
- Technical Editor: Andy Westlake
- Features Editor: Amy Davies
- Deputy Editor: Geoff Harris
- Online Editor: Joshua Waller
- Deputy Online Editor: Jessica Miller

=== Notable ex-members of staff or contributors ===
- Geoffrey Crawley – An expert on the science of photography, as well as the inventor of the Paterson range of developers, Crawley was previously the Editor of the British Journal of Photography for 21 years. He is also known for exposing the Cottingley Fairies hoax and advising investigators into the assassination of U.S. President John F. Kennedy. Crawley died in 2010.
- Bob Carlos Clarke – Irish; erotic photographer column in the early 1990s.
- David Bailey – British fashion and portrait photographer, appeared regularly in the magazine over the years.
