= Noel Atherton =

English cartographer

Noel Atherton OBE (8 May 1899 – 15 September 1987) was a British cartographer in the Admiralty Hydrographic Department, today known as the United Kingdom Hydrographic Office. He served as Chief Civil Hydrographic Officer and Assistant Superintendent of Charts, for the Admiralty between 1951 and 1962.

== Early life ==
Atherton was born on 8 May 1899 in Bradford, Yorkshire, the son of John William Atherton and Margaret Robertshaw. His father was a draughtsman for the Admiralty and relocated with his job to Whitehall at the turn of the century. His parents relocated from Yorkshire to Airedale, Sutton, Surrey whilst he was an infant. His father eventually retired as Assistant Superintendent of Charts in the Admiralty.

Atherton was destined to follow his father’s career path. He attended Whitgift School, an independent school in Croydon, Surrey, along with his younger brother. He was admitted to Peterhouse, Cambridge, however undertook a mandatory one-year term of military service between 1918 and 1919, at the rank of Lieutenant in the Royal Engineers (Signals). He resumed his education pursuing a degree in Natural Science, and graduated in 1924.

== Hydrographic Department of the Admiralty ==
Following World War I, the First International Hydrographic Conference was held in London. It led to the establishment in 1921 of the International Hydrographic Organization, with most countries founding or formalizing their own Hydrographic Office. In the 1930s, the systematic and regular collection of oceanographic and naval meteorological data had begun.

Atherton entered service in 1924, the same year Sir Percy Douglas was appointed Hydrographer of the Navy. Among his many cartographic roles would be to a participant in a number of Hydrographic Surveys, which culminated in data changes being recorded and led to revisions to Nautical charts and monitoring the Antarctic Convergence. Under the auspices of the Discovery Committee he took the lead cartographer role in the British Discovery Expeditions on board Discovery II, spending many years in the Southern Ocean and South Georgia and the South Sandwich Islands. Part of the investigation involved the last privately sponsored Antarctic missions, known as the British Graham Land expedition of 1934–1937. Under Vice-Admiral John Augustine Edgell, Atherton was appointed as the Assistant Superintendent, Chart Production and Supplies Branch from 1937 and quickly went through the ranks. He prepared charts and maps for Arthur Marder's history of the Royal Navy in the First World War. During World War II he worked closely with Sir Eric Seal, who had been Principal Private Secretary to Winston Churchill until he was released for special duties with the Admiralty. Seal was his brother in law and had married to his wife’s elder sister Gladys Leadbitter in 1926.

Atherton later served as the Chief Civil Hydrographic Officer and Assistant Superintendent of Charts, for the Admiralty from 1951 to 1962.

He attended the 7th International Hydrographic Conference alongside Rear-Admiral Sir Edmund George Irving, who had recently been appointed as the Hydrographer of the Navy.

During his final years he formed part of a committee that convinced the Admiralty that purpose-built survey vessels would be cheaper than converted naval vessels, the first being launched as HMS Hecla in 1964.

== Personal life ==
He married Daisy Phyllis Leadbitter and had two children, Phyllis, born in 1933 and John in 1937. Atherton was awarded an OBE in the Queen’s Birthday Honours of 1962. His only son, John also attended Whitgift School, however pursued a different career and graduated as a surgeon from the University of Edinburgh Medical School, followed by post-graduate studies and the Edinburgh surgical Fellowship thereafter, prior to moving to Samoa with Viopapa Annandale-Atherton, whom he married in 1965.

Atherton was widowed in 1985. He died two years later on 15 September 1987 at the age of 88, at his home in Waterer Gardens, Tadworth, Surrey.

His first cousin was the American magazine editor Robert C. Atherton.

== Legacy ==
The Atherton Islands, part of the South Shetland Islands in the South Atlantic, off the coast of Graham Land, Antarctica were charted by Discovery Investigations in 1934–35 and are named after him. They consist of two islands lying four kilometres (two nautical miles) west-northwest of Bell Point, King George Island. The naming of these islands was approved on 1 January 1953 by the Advisory Committee on Antarctic Names.

Atherton Peak (54°7′S 36°45′W) was charted by Discovery Investigations, 1929–30, and also named in his honour.

== See also ==
- Discovery Investigations
- RRS Discovery
