= Nigel Atherton =

English magazine editor

- Occupation: Editor of Amateur Photographer magazine

Nigel Atherton is the editor of Amateur Photographer magazine, the world's oldest weekly consumer photography magazine, published in the UK since October 1884.

He studied photography at Plymouth College of Art & Design and the University of Westminster.
