= Paul Atherton (entrepreneur) =

British philanthropist, innovator and engineer (1954–2023)

- Education: Imperial College London; London Business School
- Scientific career
- Workplaces: University of Cambridge; Cranfield University
- Thesis: Interferometric observations of planetary nebulae (1978)

Paul David Atherton FREng (1954–2023) was a British philanthropist, innovator and engineer. He worked on interferometry and picometre sensors. He dedicated his career to innovation, product design and supporting startup companies. He was elected Fellow of the Royal Academy of Engineering in 2018.

== Early life and education ==
Atherton studied physics at Imperial College London, where his doctoral research focused on using interferometric measurements to study planetary nebulae. During his time there, he devised a new approach to more efficiently observe the night sky, which accelerated astronomical imaging and led to the co-founding of his first company in 1978 Queensgate Instruments, which specialized in creating innovative technologies for night sky imaging and gained popularity in both academic and industrial circles. After spending a year to develop Queensgate, Atherton chose to shift his focus to entrepreneurship and subsequently completed an MBA at the London Business School.

== Career ==
Atherton specialised in the development of sensors and control devices. He taught engineering at the University of Cambridge and Cranfield University. Atherton dedicated much of his career to supporting enterprise and venture activities at Imperial College London. From 2004 he served as non executive Director of Imperial Innovations, a technology commercialisation company. He held this position for ten years, securing investment funding for various startups and spinouts. He was an early investor in FA Bio, a sustainable agriculture spinout that restores the biodiversity of degraded soil.

In 2017 Atherton founded the Imperial Venture Mentoring Service, which attracts entrepreneurs and industry experts into volunteer mentoring roles.

== Awards and honours ==
- 1995 London Business School Alumni Engagement Award
- 2013 Elected Fellow of the London Business School
- 2016 Elected Fellow of the Institute of Physics
- 2018 Fellow of the Royal Academy of Engineering
- 2021 Imperial College Alumni Entrepreneur Award

== Personal life ==
Atherton was a member of The Old Gits Band.
