= Viopapa Annandale-Atherton =

Samoan doctor

- Born: Viopapa Annandale; Samoa
- Education: University of Otago
- Known for: The first Samoan woman to graduate in medicine from the University of Otago

Viopapa Annandale-Atherton (also known as Papali'i Dr Viopapa Annandale-Atherton; 1940 – 4 November 2024) was a Samoan medical doctor who worked to improve the health of women and children in the Pacific Islands. She was the first Pacific Island woman to graduate from a New Zealand university.

== Early life and education ==
Born in Apia, Samoa in 1940 Annandale-Atherton was the daughter of Edward Annandale and Sina Nelson. She received a scholarship to study at Epsom Girls Grammar School. She studied medicine at the University of Otago, graduating MB ChB in 1964.

== Career ==
After graduation Annandale-Atherton went to Edinburgh where she was a house surgeon at the Royal Infirmary. She studied at the London School of Hygiene and Tropical Medicine receiving a Diploma in Tropical Health in 1976.

Annandale-Atherton served on many health organisations: the World Health Organisation's (WHO) advisory committee on long-acting contraceptives, as head of Samoa's Maternal and Child Health Department (1971–1982), one of the founders of a school for special needs (1979), on a Samoan body looking into domestic violence and human rights (1994), and president of Soroptimist International of Samoa.

In 1982, after many years of moving between the United Kingdom and Samoa, she returned to Samoa to set up a general practice.

Annandale-Atherton worked to improve the health and welfare of women and children in the Pacific Islands. This has included obtaining international funding for projects from USAID, the EU and WHO to support women and children, and initiating family planning services and vaccination programmes in Samoa. She was active in the Pan-Pacific and South East Asian Women's Association and was international president from 2004 to 2010.

== Honours and awards ==
Annandale-Atherton received an Honorary Doctorate of Law from the University of Otago in 2019.

She was granted the chiefly title of Papali'i for her services to Samoa. It was conferred by Malietoa Tanumafili II, the head of state.

== Personal life ==
Annandale-Atherton's great-grandfather was Thomas Annandale, a Professor of Clinical Surgery in Scotland. Her grandfather was Samoan businessman and politician Ta'isi Olaf Frederick Nelson.

She met her husband John Atherton in Edinburgh, where they married in 1965; they had two sons. Her father in law was Noel Atherton.

Annandale-Atherton died in Samoa on 4 November 2024.
