= Hacia Atherton =

Australian business women advocating for women in STEM

Hacia Atherton (born November 29, 1987) is an Australian CEO, CPA, founder, and speaker. She is an advocate for greater diversity in STEM and male-dominated business and trades sectors, through the charity and social enterprise, Empowered Women in Trades (EWIT), which she established in 2020. In 2021, she launched the annual EWIT Awards to champion women in trades professions and those who support them.

== Education and career ==
Atherton was born in Melbourne, to a family in the trades and manufacturing industries.

She holds a Bachelor of Commerce (Accounting) from Deakin University, and a Masters in Applied Positive Psychology from the University of Melbourne.

In 2017, while training to compete at the World Equestrian Games in dressage, Atherton was accidentally crushed by her horse. In the six-month recovery and physiotherapy period to walk again, she gained her CPA Australia qualification and began her motivational speaking and coaching career, founding Hacia Atherton International in 2020.

== Recognition ==
Atherton was listed among the "Top 30 Women Disruptors To Look Out For" by NYC Journal in 2021, and among the "Top 30 Inspiring Women" by Disruptor Magazine in 2021. Insight Success included her in their "Top 10 Influential Women Entrepreneurs" list.

In 2024, she won a Telstra Business Award for Best in Business.

== Advocacy ==
Atherton has been sought out to share her experiences and expertise on The Project, Ticker News, Channel 7, News.com.au, the Sydney Morning Herald, and multiple trade and industry publications.
