= John W. Okey =

American judge (1827–1885)

John Waterman Okey
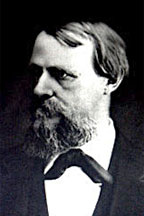

Associate Justice of the Ohio Supreme Court
- In office February 9, 1878 – July 25, 1885
- Preceded by: John Welch
- Succeeded by: Gibson Atherton

Personal details
- Born: January 3, 1827 Woodsfield, Ohio
- Died: July 25, 1885 (aged 58) Columbus, Ohio
- Resting place: Spring Grove Cemetery
- Party: Democratic
- Spouse: Mary J. Bloor
- Children: four

John Waterman Okey (January 3, 1827 – July 25, 1885) was a judge and legal author in the U.S. State of Ohio who was an Ohio Supreme Court Judge 1878–1885. He was a member of the Democratic Party

Okey was born in Monroe County, Ohio near Woodsfield. He attended the Monroe Academy. He studied law at Woodsfield, and became Probate Judge and Judge of Common Pleas.

In 1865, Okey moved to Cincinnati, and with Judge Gholson he wrote Gholson and Okey's Digest of Ohio Reports. He also authored Okey and Miller's Municipal Law with S. A. Miller.

In 1877, Okey defeated Republican William Wartenbee Johnson for election to the Ohio Supreme Court. In 1882, he defeated John H. Doyle for re-election. He died July 25, 1885. He was buried at Spring Grove Cemetery in Cincinnati, Ohio.

Okey was married to Mary J. Bloor in Woodsfield in 1849. They raised two sons and two daughters.

== See also ==
- List of justices of the Ohio Supreme Court

== Notes ==
Legal offices
Preceded by John Welch	Associate Justice of the Ohio Supreme Court; 1878–1885	Succeeded by Gibson Atherton
