= Charles Brown (cricketer, born 1854) =

Australian-born English cricketer

Personal information
- Full name: Charles Atherton Brown
- Born: 8 June 1854; Sydney, New South Wales, Australia
- Died: 8 July 1917 (aged 63); Grendon, Warwickshire, England
- Batting: Right-handed
- Bowling: Left-arm roundarm fast

Domestic team information
- Years: Team
- 1876–1878: Sussex

Career statistics
Competition	First-class
Matches	11
Runs scored	137
Batting average	9.13
100s/50s	–/–
Top score	26
Balls bowled	1,223
Wickets	25
Bowling average	23.00
5 wickets in innings	2
10 wickets in match	–
Best bowling	7/58
Catches/stumpings	10/–
- Source: Cricinfo, 20 June 2012

Charles Atherton Brown (8 June 1854 – 8 July 1917) was an Australian-born English cricketer. Brown was a right-handed batsman who bowled left-arm roundarm fast.

Brown was born at Sydney, New South Wales. He made his first-class debut for Sussex against Kent in 1876 at the County Ground, Hove. He made ten further first-class appearances for the county, the last of which came against Kent 1876 at the Higher Common Ground, Tunbridge Wells. In his eleven first-class matches for Sussex, he took 25 wickets at an average of 23.00, with best figures of 7/58. These figures, which were one of two five-wicket hauls he took, came against Gloucestershire in 1877. With the bat, he scored 137 runs at a batting average of 9.13, with a high score of 26.

Brown died at the now demolished Grendon Hall in Grendon, Warwickshire, on 8 July 1917.
