= Roger Hicks (author) =

British author (1950–2019)

Roger Hicks (1950–2019) was a British author of more than 30 photography books, plus a biography of 14th Dalai Lama written with Ngakpa Chogyam, a teacher of Buddhism in UK, travel books, cook-books and others. Many were written with his wife Frances Schultz (deceased 25th November, 2020).

A regular contributor to Amateur Photographer Magazine, he frequently wrote for Shutterbug magazine in the United States.

== Publications ==
- Roger Hicks and Ngakpa Chogyam, Great Ocean, HarperCollins, 1984, ISBN 0906540313
