= Oscar W. Newman =

American judge

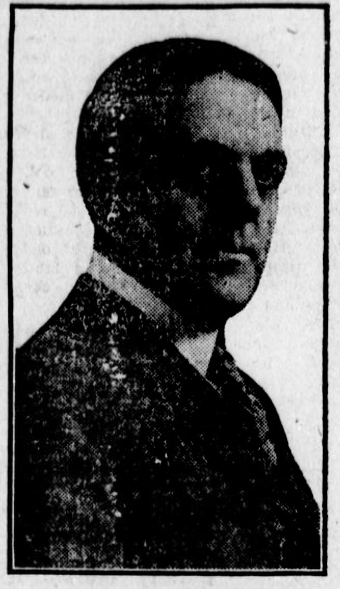
- circa 1912

Associate Justice of the Ohio Supreme Court
- In office January 1, 1913 – January 1, 1919
- Preceded by: William T. Spear
- Succeeded by: James E. Robinson

Personal details
- Born: April 14, 1867 Portsmouth, Ohio
- Died: February 19, 1928 (aged 60) Columbus, Ohio
- Resting place: Greenlawn Cemetery, Portsmouth, Ohio
- Party: Democratic
- Spouse: Charl Thompson
- Children: one
- Education: Kenyon College

Oscar W. Newman (April 14, 1867 – February 19, 1928) was a jurist from Portsmouth, Ohio, United States who was elected as a Democrat to a seat on the Ohio Supreme Court from 1913 to 1918.

== Biography ==
Oscar W. Newman was born to George O. and Clay B. Moore Newman of Portsmouth, Scioto County, Ohio on April 14, 1867. He graduated from Portsmouth High School in 1884. He studied at Kenyon College for three years, and then studied law in his father's office before admission to the bar in 1889, when he joined his father's law practice.

In September, 1893, Newman joined Albert C. Thompson in a law partnership at Portsmouth that lasted until 1898, when Thompson was appointed to the United States District Court for the Southern District of Ohio. Newman then practiced alone. Newman married Thompson's daughter, Charl Thompson, on June 6, 1894. They had one daughter named Katherine L. Newman.

Newman ran unsuccessfully as the Democratic nominee for Common Pleas Court in 1904, and for the Ohio Fourth District Court of Appeals in 1910.

Newman's only election win came in 1912, when he ran for the Ohio Supreme Court and won a six-year term, January 1, 1913 to January 1, 1919. He ran for re-election in 1918, and lost .

Newman remained in Columbus in 1919, and opened a private practice. He was assigned by U.S. District Court Judge Benson W. Hough as a special commissioner to review filings in a utility rate case in Columbus.

Newman died after suffering a heart attack at the Columbus Athletic Club on February 19, 1928. Funeral services were at his home in Columbus, with burial at Greenlawn Cemetery in Portsmouth.
