= James Atherton (footballer, born 1875) =

English footballer

Personal information
- Full name: James Atherton
- Date of birth: 1875
- Place of birth: Adlington, England
- Date of death: 1923 (aged 47–48)
- Position: Winger

Senior career*
Years	Team	Apps	(Gls)
1894–1895	Pemberton Wanderers		
1895–1896	Wigan Nondescripts		
1896–1897	South Shore		
1897–1899	Wigan County		
1899–1900	Preston North End	13	(0)
1900–1903	Southport Central		
1903–1904	Brynn Central		
1904–1905	Ashton Recreational		
Total		13	(0)
- * Club domestic league appearances and goals

James Atherton (1875–1923) was an English footballer who played in the Football League for Preston North End.
