= Gibson Atherton =

American judge

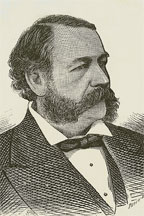

Member of the U.S. House of Representatives from Ohio's 14th district
- In office March 4, 1879 – March 3, 1883
- Preceded by: Ebenezer B. Finley
- Succeeded by: George L. Converse
- Constituency: 14th district (1879–1881); 13th district (1881–1883)

Associate Justice of the Ohio Supreme Court
- In office August 20, 1885 – December 16, 1885
- Appointed by: George Hoadly
- Preceded by: John W. Okey
- Succeeded by: William T. Spear

Personal details
- Born: Gibson Atherton; January 19, 1831 Newark, Ohio, US
- Died: November 10, 1887 (aged 56) Newark, Ohio, US
- Resting place: Cedar Hill Cemetery
- Party: Democratic
- Spouse: Margaret A. E. Kumler
- Children: four
- Education: Denison University; Miami University

Gibson Atherton (January 19, 1831 – November 10, 1887) was an American lawyer and politician who served as a U.S. representative from Ohio from 1879 to 1883.

== Early life ==
He was the son of John Trueman Atherton (1799–1882) and Clarissa Ackley (1796–1883). He attended Denison University, Granville, Ohio.

He graduated from Miami University, Oxford, Ohio, in 1853. He served as Principal of the local academy at Osceola, Missouri, in 1853 and 1854.

Later he studied law, and was admitted to the bar in 1855 and commenced practice in Newark, Ohio where he also served as president of the board of education of Newark for fifteen years.

== Career ==
Atherton was elected prosecuting attorney of Licking County in 1857 and reelected in 1859 and 1861. While serving as mayor of Newark 1860–1864, he was an unsuccessful Democratic candidate for the State senate in 1863. He ran for judge of the court of common pleas in 1866, but was unsuccessful. Other local and national political service included time as member of the city council of Newark for two years and a delegate to the Democratic National Convention at St. Louis in 1876.

=== Congress ===
Atherton was elected as a Democrat to the Forty-sixth and Forty-seventh Congresses (March 4, 1879 – March 3, 1883), but afterwards chose not to seek renomination.

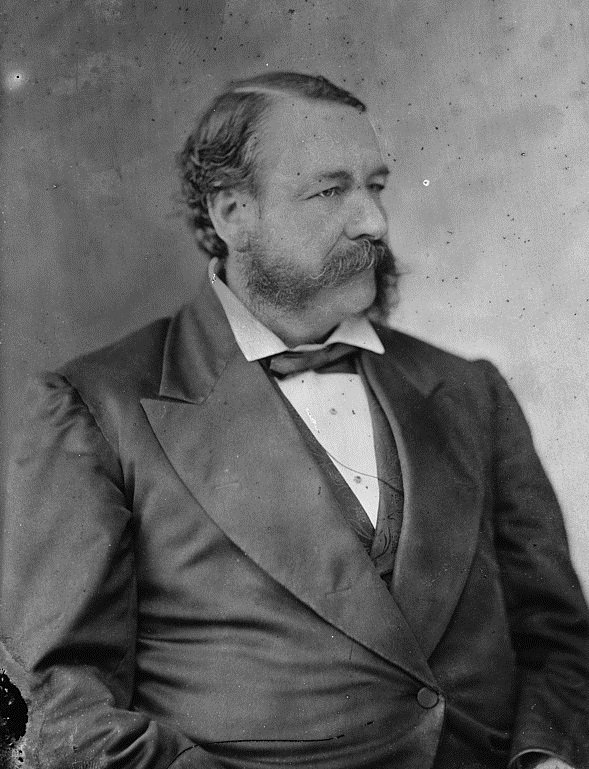

=== Later career ===
Atherton was appointed to the Ohio Supreme Court by Governor Hoadly August 20, 1885 to fill a vacancy created by the death of John W. Okey. He lost election for the remaining two years of Okey's term that autumn to his Republican opponent, and resigned December 16 of that year.

After retiring from the bench, he resumed the practice of law until his death in Newark, Ohio.

== Personal ==
Atherton married Margaret A. E. Kumler in Butler County, Ohio on November 18, 1856. They had four children and all were born in Ohio.

His eldest daughter, Clara B. Atherton (1858–1939) was an accomplished linguist who worked for the War Department in Washington DC. In 1885 she toured Europe with her parents. It was in Italy where she met her future husband, Emil Reidel. They married in Malta on Mar 17, 1886 and had 2 children.

His other three children were Charles E Atherton (born 1860), Della M Atherton (born 1865) and Anna V Atherton (born 1867).

=== Death and burial ===
He died on November 10, 1887. He was interred in Cedar Hill Cemetery.

== Ancestry ==
His grandfather, Thomas Atherton (1765–1848) moved from Pennsylvania to Ohio.

He descended from Quakers; his great-grandfather Caleb Atherton (1736–1776), being a Quaker who was “outed” on Oct 4, 1764 at the Uwchlan Monthly Quaker Meeting for not following their principles and for marrying "out of their Society". Caleb died in the revolutionary war at the Battle of Wyoming. He is related to historian, Lewis Eldon Atherton.

The next generation back had emigrated to Pennsylvania from Farnworth, Lancashire in the 1700s. He was a direct descendant of Gawain Atherton. His distant Atherton relatives include Bobby Atherton and Tommy Atherton.

== External Sources ==
- United States Congress. "Gibson Atherton (id: A000325)". Biographical Directory of the United States Congress.

U.S. House of Representatives
Preceded by Ebenezer B. Finley	Member of the U.S. House of Representatives from Ohio's 14th congressional district 1879–1881	Succeeded by George W. Geddes
Preceded by Adoniram J. Warner	Member of the U.S. House of Representatives from Ohio's 13th congressional district 1881–1883	Succeeded by George L. Converse
