= Walter Atherton (footballer) =

English footballer

Personal information
- Date of birth: abt 1875
- Place of birth: Blackpool, Lancashire, England
- Position: Left half

Senior career*
Years	Team	Apps	(Gls)
1898	Blackpool	13	(0)
- * Club domestic league appearances and goals

Walter Atherton (born c. 1875) was an English footballer. His only known club was Blackpool, for whom he made thirteen Football League appearances in 1898.

Atherton was arrested in 1903 after his shop in Blackpool was found to be used for betting purposes. He was fined £10.

In 1910, by which time he was a director at Blackpool, he took part in a bowling competition.
