= James Atherton (photographer) =

American photographer (1927–2011)

James Kenneth Ward Atherton
- Born: December 16, 1927; Washington DC, United States
- Died: November 29, 2011 (aged 83); Annapolis, Maryland, U.S.
- Other names: James K. W. Atherton; Jim Atherton; and within the industry Bad light Atherton
- Occupations: Photojournalist, News photographer, military photographer
- Notable credits: Annual White House Photographers Association Photo Contest (1952, 1957, 1961, 1962, 1963 and 1964); Kodak Professional White House National Press Photographers Association (NPPA) Achievement Award (1997)
- Spouse: Patricia Ann Hall (m. 1930–2014)
- Children: 4

James Kenneth Ward Atherton (December 16, 1927 – November 29, 2011) was an American press photographer active in Washington D.C. for over forty years.

== Early years and education ==
Born on December 16, 1927, in the District of Columbia. He was the son of Fairfax Malcolm Atherton (1892-1971) and Mildred Herrsher (1900-1958), the daughter of a Bavarian immigrant who settled in Fort Worth, Texas. His father, Fairfax was born in Atlanta, and worked for the U.S. Federal Court in Washington D.C.

Atherton graduated from Roosevelt High School, before joining the United States Navy. He served during 1946 and 1947.

== Career ==
Atherton served in Honolulu, and travelled to mainland China, and other parts of Asian Pacific region, and eventually became a U.S. military photographer during the period of Nuclear testing at Bikini Atoll by the United States.

The United States Navy gave Atherton the opportunity to pursue a trade in order to return to civilian life and he elected to attend a photography college in Silver Spring, Maryland.

In 1948 he was a staffer for the wires, as a telephoto operator at ACME Newspictures agency, becoming a photographer in 1950 at ACME, which a year later became part of United Press International. He remained a freelancer for UPI for a period of over twenty years. Initially, as the rookie, he worked the night shift, and soon encountered difficulty gaining access to high society parties in Washington D.C. He overcome this cultural barrier, by dressing in the attire the hosts had stipulated for their guests.

Atherton joined the National Press Photographers Association (NPPA) in 1955 and remained a Life Member of this association.

The first Annual White House Photographers Association Photo Contest took place in 1956. The following year, Atherton caught the attention of President Dwight D. Eisenhower and was praised for photographing his wife, Mamie Eisenhower peering through a mask with a “I like Ike” slogan at a Republican Rally. He remained a member of this association beyond his retirement.

Atherton photographs encapsulate the period of the Kennedy administration, between January 1961 and November 1963.

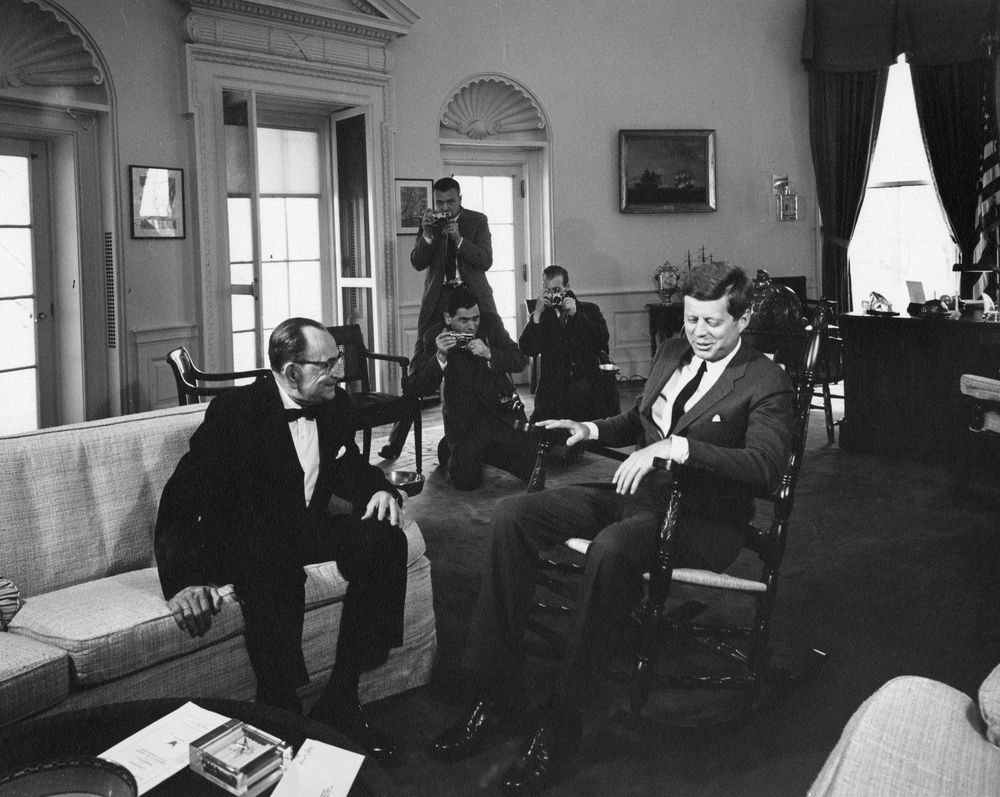
President John F. Kennedy sits in the hand-carved rocking chair that was presented as a gift, on behalf of the Dominican people, by Secretary of State for Foreign Affairs of the Dominican Republic Dr. José Bonilla Atiles (left). United Press International (UPI) photographer, James K. W. Atherton (standing), LOOK Magazine photographer, Stanley Tretick (crouching at left), and another unidentified photographer take photos in the background. Oval Office, White House, Washington, D.C.

Atherton was recognized on April 27, 1962, at the Annual White House Photographers Association Photo Contest (1962), by winning first prize. That year, he also won first in the White House Photographers Association “personalities category”, with photo of Caroline Kennedy in conversation with a playmate. Other significant photographs included “a night view of the Capitol”, and Roger Maris on first with a pained look after drawing a walk after last days of the season; Grace Kelly and President John F. Kennedy; and former Presidents Harry Truman and Eisenhower with President Kennedy at the funeral of Speaker Sam Rayburn in 1961. He covered President John F. Kennedy handling of the Cuban Missile Crisis in 1962. One of his most iconic photographs is held within the Library of Congress collection, and was taken on August 28, 1963, from an elevated position, behind the Statue of Abraham Lincoln (Lincoln Memorial). It is titled “Emancipator looks down on demonstrators”.

As a freelance photographer, he covered every U.S. president from Harry S. Truman to Richard Nixon, as well as the major events of the day, such as the McCarthy hearings, the 1963 March on Washington for Jobs and Freedom and the State funeral of John F. Kennedy in November 1963. Very few contemporary world leaders from this period of history escaped his lens.

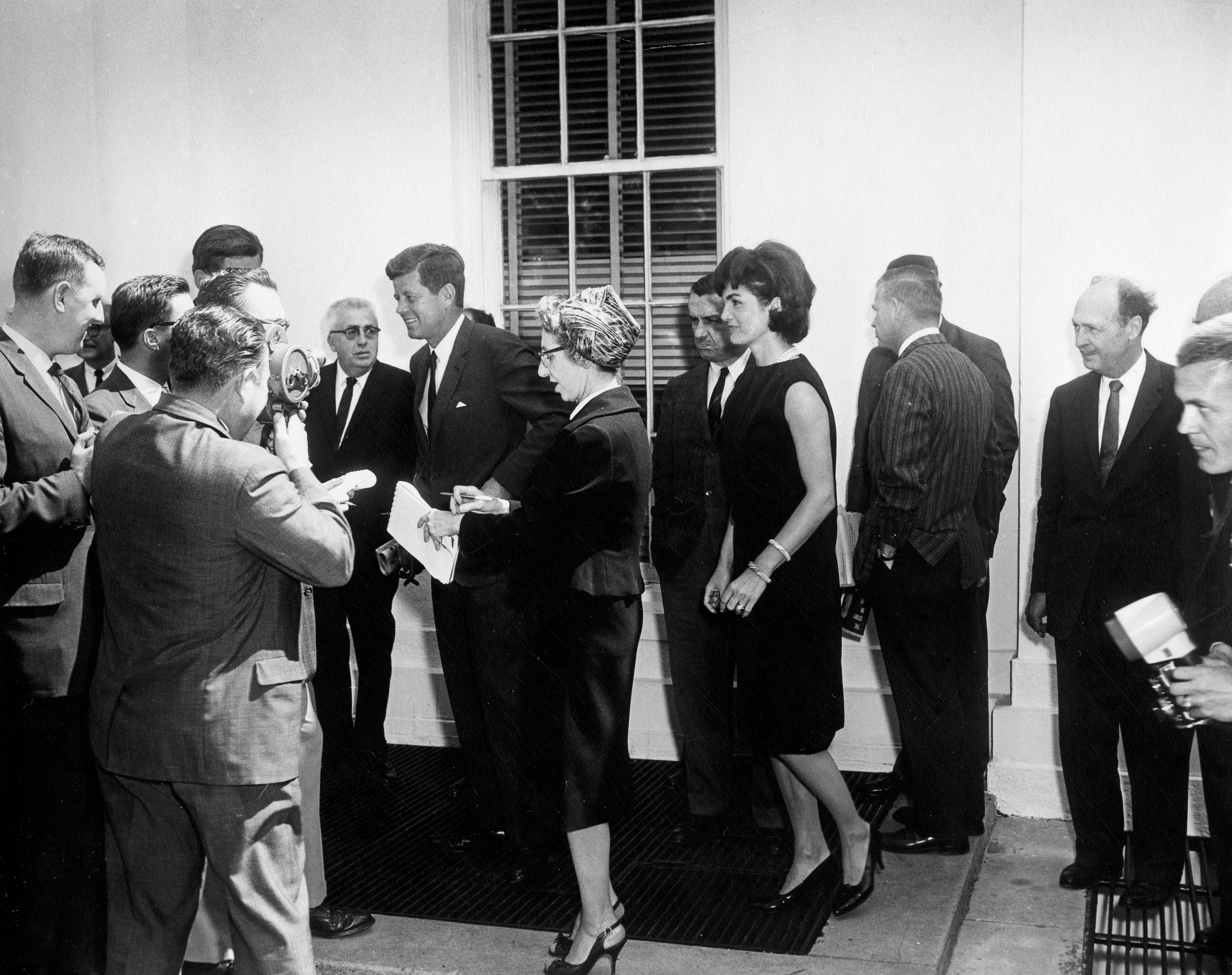
President John F. Kennedy and First Lady Jacqueline Kennedy bid farewell to Prince Rainier III and Princess Grace of Monaco in 1961. UPI photographer James K. W. Atherton can be seen on the right edge

On April 11, 1963, he was the press photographer during the search for USS Thresher. The following month he took first place at the Annual White House Photographers Association Photo Contest; this time in the “spot-news category”, with a photo titled “Back from Space”.

He captured on film significant moments of the Kennedy Presidency. One of Atherton's most iconic photographs is of President John F. Kennedy standing at Checkpoint Charlie shortly before President gave his "Ich bin ein Berliner" speech on June 26, 1963, in West Berlin. Historically it is one of the best-known speeches of the Cold War and among the most famous anti-communist speeches. A signed print of his UPI photograph is now a collector's item.

Under the President Richard Nixon administration, in 1970 he was recognized one final time by the White House Photographers Association receiving the First Prize in the “presidential class” category. That same year, Atherton chose a different career path, by becoming the picture editor at The Washington Post, moving on to be their staff photographer in 1973, allowing him to return to his passion, using his own camera.

Atherton was also a member of a standing committee within the Senate Press Photographers Gallery and by 1972 was listed within the Congressional Directory as the Head of Photography. His award-winning photo coverage of the Watergate hearings is most notable.

Atherton continued to cover Capitol Hill throughout the Iran–Contra affair hearings, with Getty Images owning his Stock photography; at least 125 premium high resolution images that he captured through his lens. Other notable events; on Nov 11, 1983, he captured Senator Charles Mathias and Majority Leader Howard Baker discussing the aftermath of the 1983 United States Senate bombing.

In 1997 he received the Kodak Professional White House National Press Photographers Association (NPPA) Achievement Award.

Although he had retired from photo journalism in 1990, he continued to make himself available to students of photo journalism and academia until his death in 2011. Press around the U.S. paid tribute to him, with lengthy obituaries featured in the Boston Globe, The New York Times and the Washington Post.

In his lengthy obituary, The Boston Globe described how his colleagues referred to him as:

Bad Light Atherton

from his practice of sacrificing what other photographers considered the best (or easiest) lighting conditions for a more arresting image.

== Personal ==
He married Patricia Ann Hall, the second daughter of Bernard and Clara Hall, in secret on October 18, 1949, at Woodside Methodist Church in Silver Spring, Maryland. A second wedding ceremony, in public, followed on February 14, 1950. They had four children and for ten years ran a book store. “Atherton's Used Book was located on Antique Row in Kensington, Maryland and operated between 1972 and 1982.

Atherton had suffered from cardiovascular discomfort since a heart attack and bypass surgery in 1999. He died on November 29, 2011, aged 83, in Annapolis, Maryland, while walking alongside his wife towards a friends house, a short distance from his home.

He was buried at St. Paul's United Methodist Church Memorial Garden, in Kensington, Maryland. His wife died 3 years later.

== Legacy ==
Atherton has since been described as a major influence on photographers and news photography in the nation's capitol.

To commemorate the 50th anniversary of the March on Washington, when 250,000 people from all walks of life participated in the largest non-violent demonstration for civil rights that Americans had ever witnessed, an exhibit including Atherton's photographs was held between August 28, 2013 and August 30, 2014. It was titled “A Day Like No Other: Commemorating the 50th Anniversary”.

The John F. Kennedy Presidential Library and Museum has identified 142 records, in its photograph collection that have either been attributed to Atherton, or he is a protagonist in the photographic image.

Atherton's peers also photographed him at notable historical events, such as a spoof picture of him seated with many of the press credentials mandated to cover the First inauguration of Dwight D. Eisenhower in 1953; years later standing in a pool car in 1968, while he covered the visit of Pope Paul VI to New York, waiting for the Pope and President Lyndon Johnson to leave the Waldorf Astoria Hotel.

== Podcast ==
During 2008, Atherton was a guest of “The Candid Frame: Conversations on Photography”, hosted by Ibarionex Perello. The interview covers his entire photographic career over a period of 50 minutes.
