= Robert C. Atherton =

American magazine editor, author, publisher, artist and designer (1908–1986)

Robert Crossley Atherton
- Born: February 23, 1908; Philadelphia, Pennsylvania, United States
- Died: January 12, 1986 (aged 77); Doylestown, Pennsylvania, United States
- Education: Pennsylvania Museum and School of Industrial Art
- Occupations: Magazine editor, author, publisher, artist, designer
- Years active: 1930s–1980s
- Employer: Hearst Magazines
- Known for: Last male editor of Cosmopolitan magazine
- Notable work: Editor-in-chief of Cosmopolitan (1959–1965); Art director at Ladies' Home Journal
- Spouses: Margaret Wood (m. 1938); Mary Stambaugh
- Children: 2
- Relatives: Noel Atherton (first cousin)

Robert Crossley Atherton (February 23, 1908 – January 12, 1986) was an American magazine editor, author, publisher, artist and designer. He was the art director at Ladies' Home Journal for twelve years and the editor-in-chief of Cosmopolitan magazine for seven years; the last male editor-in-chief of this former literary magazine from 1959 to 1965. He remained with Cosmopolitan's parent company, Hearst Magazines, becoming International Travel Editor for their wide portfolio of magazines.

== Early life ==
He was the son of English emigrants, Alfred Atherton and Ada Crossley, from Manningham, Bradford, Yorkshire. His father was a carpenter by trade. His mother was born in Swinton, Greater Manchester and had migrated to Bradford with her family as a child. Atherton's parents were married in Bradford Cathedral on November 7, 1900. Following the birth of his elder brother Norman Sydney on July 31, 1901, the family emigrated to the United States, and set up permanent residence in Philadelphia.

Atherton attended Frankford High School in Philadelphia and studied at the Pennsylvania Museum and School of Industrial Art, which at the time was known as the Philadelphia Museum School of Art. He aspired to be a commercial artist, specializing in illustrations in the 1920s. However he became an art teacher in 1930 and was responsible for drafting the first art curriculum for the School District of Philadelphia. He decided to leave the teaching profession in 1935.

== Career ==
Although notable for being the editor-in-chief of Cosmopolitan magazine between 1959 and 1965, Atherton had a long career in publishing. Atherton's first exposure to the industry started with “E.A. Wright Printing, Engraving and Publishing” in 1932. He accepted a role with the Curtis Publishing Company, the owners of Ladies Home Journal in 1936, where he remained for 12 years, as an associate editor.

In 1948 he became an art director at Hearst's International-Cosmopolitan Magazine. By 1949 he was associate editor, writing articles for Cosmopolitan magazine. William Randolph Hearst died in 1951, and the magazine became known as Cosmopolitan. Initially an increased fiction program was instituted, with Atherton hiring a number of high-profile illustrators such as Norman Rockwell, Al Parker and Robert Fawcett. This refresh interested the owners who were looking for new ideas.

However, with the September 1954 edition of the magazine, Atherton was by now just over one year into his new role as executive editor, and he chose to ignore the usual roster of the above well known illustrators, by bringing in new talent for a “trial refresh” of the style of the magazine. He assigned a total of six unknown artists and illustrators; which included Lloyd Viehman, Charles Kirkpatrick, and his wife's first cousin, Karl Reap. Critics had previously targeted the magazine as "bland" and boring. The magazine also began to run less fiction during the mid-1950s. Circulation dropped to slightly over a million by 1955.

Atherton soon replaced the editor, John J. O'Connell who had been in the role since 1951. However, in 1959 when Atherton became editor-in-chief, it coincided with a period when magazines were being overshadowed by the rise of paperbacks and television. The Golden Age of magazines was coming to an end as mass market, general interest publications gave way to special interest magazines, by genre, targeting specialized audiences. Cosmopolitan's circulation continued to decline 20% over the next decade, as did advertising revenue of a similar amount. In 1959, Atherton took the necessary steps to transform the magazine by filling the pages with art reproductions and both informative and current articles relating to law and medicine. On the cover he put fashion icons, actors, authors, performers of popular music and celebrities. He subsequently added an entertainment section. He had a high profile and as such was invited to meet President John F. Kennedy at the White House. However, by 1965, after failed attempts by the magazine owners to sell it, a new potential editor was identified. Atherton was ousted from his role as the U.S. editor of Cosmopolitan and replaced by Helen Gurley Brown who by the end of 1965 had completed the full transformation from a literary magazine into a women's magazine.

Atherton went on to become International Editor of Hearst Magazines, followed by International Travel Editor for their wide portfolio of magazines, writing elaborate articles about distant lands aimed at the cultured American reader, with exotic titles such as "Flaming swords of Armenia".

As a lifelong connoisseur of food, during the late 1960s and into the 1970s, Atherton wrote and illustrated a half page full color syndicated newspaper column called “The Gourmania Guide”.

At the end of his long publishing career he opened an art gallery in New Hope, Pennsylvania. At the age of 58, Atherton became recognized as an accomplished artist under the name of “Crossley Atherton”, in honor of both his paternal and maternal heritage. His paintings were initially contemporary in style.

As a successful artist, by 1977 Atherton gave lectures on “How to Earn a Living With Your Art”, a concept involving a panel of 8 reputable artists such as Selma Burke. He had a studio in Lambertville, New Jersey and was considered by many to be an outstanding Abstract expressionism painter. He exhibited his works at the Philadelphia Museum of Art, the Pennsylvania Academy of the Fine Arts, the Philadelphia Art Alliance and the Art Institute of Chicago. At the time of his death he was listed in “Who's Who in Commerce and Industry”, “Who’s Who in America”, and “Who's Who in American Art”.

== Personal ==
He married Margaret Wood on January 15, 1938. They had two daughters. During the 1950s, he lived with his family in a 175-year-old farmhouse situated on Dark Hollow Road, Jamisson, Bucks County, Pennsylvania. He traveled to England annually accompanied by his wife on board the RMS Queen Mary. The Daily Intelligencer reported on Feb 27, 1958, the birth of his youngest daughter. In September 1960 The Intelligencer of Doylestown, Pennsylvania reported “…the Atherton’s will retain their house in Jamison but will move to Doylestown, Pennsylvania in November”. It also mentions that he commuted to New York daily from his farm in Pennsylvania, and spent a great deal of time traveling.

His interests included shooting and fishing. He was a member of the Quaker City Gun and the Bucks County Fish & Game Association. He owned an island off the coast of Naples, Florida.

Atherton died in Doylestown Hospital, Pennsylvania on January 12, 1986. He was survived by his wife, Mary Stambaugh, and 2 daughters, Jane Elizabeth and Anne Victoria from his marriage to Margaret Wood.

His first cousin was the British cartographer Noel Atherton.

== See also ==
- Cosmopolitan (magazine)
- Ladies' Home Journal
