= Jim Atherton =

Welsh footballer

Personal information
- Full name: James Geoffrey Atherton
- Date of birth: 2 April 1923
- Place of birth: Queensferry, Flintshire, Wales
- Date of death: 1 February 2010 (aged 86)
- Place of death: Flint, Flintshire, Wales
- Position: Goalkeeper

Senior career*
Years	Team	Apps	(Gls)
- Chester City
1947–1949	Wrexham	18	(0)
- Ellesmere Port Town
- * Club domestic league appearances and goals

James Geoffrey Atherton (2 April 1923 – 1 February 2010) was a Welsh professional footballer who served as a goalkeeper. He played in the English Football League for Wrexham in the 1940s. He also played for Chester City and Ellesmere Port Town.
