= Lewis Eldon Atherton =

American historian (1905–1989)

- Born: March 1, 1905; Bosworth, Missouri, U.S.
- Died: March 25, 1989 (aged 84); Boone County, Missouri, U.S.
- Resting place: Oak Hill Cemetery, Carroll County, Missouri, U.S.
- Occupations: Historian; academic
- Spouse: Mary Louise Webb (m. 1929)
- Children: 3 (2 adopted)
- Parent(s): Caleb Franklin Atherton; Ethel Framer
- Relatives: Gibson Atherton (cousin)

Academic background
- Education: University of Oklahoma; University of Missouri (MA, PhD)

Lewis Eldon Atherton (March 1, 1905 – March 25, 1989) was an American historian and academic from Missouri. He taught at the University of Missouri in Columbia, Missouri, for over 30 years.

== Early life ==
Atherton was born on March 1, 1905, in the small town of Bosworth, Missouri. He was the son of Caleb Franklin Atherton and Ethel Framer. Although born in Missouri, his family originated from Brown County, Ohio. His early years were spent on the family farm.

He attended Carrollton High School and went on to enroll at the University of Oklahoma in 1923, transferring to the University of Missouri in Columbia in 1925, graduating Phi Beta Kappa in 1927. He received his M.A. in 1930 and an PhD. in history in 1937 having been mentored by his friend and fellow scholar, Elmer Ellis.

== Career ==
Atherton became a teacher at the New Mexico Military Institute, Roswell, NM (1928–1929), moving onto become an instructor at St. Joseph Junior College, St. Joseph (1930–1931), followed by five years at Wentworth Military Academy Junior College, Lexington, Missouri (1931–1936).

He became a lecturer at the University of Missouri in Columbia in 1936. Between 1939 and 1973 he was their professor of history. He became a distinguished professor in 1959. Since 2000, the Lewis E. Atherton Prizes at the University of Missouri are awarded to an outstanding doctoral dissertation and master's thesis on Missouri history or biography on an annual basis.

Atherton was an advisor for a series of educational films produced by Coronet Films. He was integral to the documentary retelling of the "Daniel Boone in America's Story".

== Honors ==
Atherton was awarded a Guggenheim Fellowship in 1941.

== Contribution to Midwestern Social History ==
One of Atherton's most recognized works, "Main Street on the Middle Border" was published in 1954 by Bloomington: Indiana University Press.

=== Published works ===
- The Pioneer Merchant in Mid-America - first published in 1939.
- The Frontier Merchant in Mid-America
- The Southern Store, 1800–1860 - first published in 1949.
- Main Street on the Middle Border - first published in 1954.
- The Cattle Kings - first published in 1961.

=== Published articles on frontier history ===
Atherton was also the author of many articles on frontier history in the Missouri Historical Review. One fine example of his research is Vol. 30, no. 1 1935, page 3, on the frontier Missouri Mercantile Firm “James and Robert Aull”. He also published an article in the Kansas Historical Quarterly. One article by him titled “Disorganizing Effects on the Mexican War”, published in May 1937 (vol. 6, no. 2 1937, pages 115 to 123) has been digitized with permission of the Kansas State Historical Society.

Atherton also contributed to the Mississippi Valley Historical Review, the Pacific Historical Review; as well as the Bulletin of the Business Historical Society, placing an emphasis on Agricultural History.

He is also credited for his advisory role in the TV production of "Daniel Boone in America's Story". 16 minutes in color aired on September 3, 1968. See List of Coronet Films.

== Historian ==
=== Western Historical Manuscript Collection ===
Atherton was a distinguished historian of the South and the American West. He actively acquired manuscripts for the Western Historical Manuscript Collection, where he served twice as director in the 1950s.

Prior to 2011, the Western Historical Manuscript Collection was jointly held by the State Historical Society of Missouri and the University of Missouri. The Western Historical Manuscript Collection (WHMC) is accessible at various locations throughout the state. Each of the four locations offer different historical material; the WHMC in Kansas City, specializes in the history and culture of Kansas City; the WHMC collection located at the Missouri University of Science and Technology features material concerning the Ozark highland and southern Missouri; and likewise, the WHMC office in St. Louis focuses on collecting material relating to the history of St. Louis and its surrounding region. The WHMC location in Columbia, Missouri, specializes on the history of the state from prior its establishment to the present, as well as, "the trans-Mississippi West: social and cultural, religious and educational, military and political, economic and legal, business and labor, urban and rural, ethnic, environmental, and many others." The Columbia collection consists in part of diaries, letters, photographs, and other material, of Missourians ranging from farmers, bankers, and frontier pioneers.

However, during 2011, the Western Historical Manuscript Collection was absorbed into the State Historical Society and ceased to exist. The manuscripts and collection of the Western Historical Manuscript Collection can be accessed at the Society's Research Center located in Ellis Library and at Society research centers in Kansas City, St. Louis, Rolla, Cape Girardeau, and Springfield.

== Personal life ==
While teaching in New Mexico he met Mary Louise Webb. They married on June 5, 1929, in Roswell, New Mexico. He was father to three children: Richard F. (d. 1935), and two adopted daughters, Mary Ann (d.1965) and Barbara Lee (d. 1984).

Both Lewis and his wife Mary (whom he referred to as Louise) and their daughter set up a number of endowments for educational benefit.

Atherton was also an active researcher of his own family history; this legacy was donated to the University of Missouri.

Atherton died in Boone County, Missouri, on March 25, 1989, aged 84. He is buried at Oak Hill Cemetery in Carroll County, Missouri.

== Ancestry ==
Atherton descended from Henry Atherton, a Quaker (b.1653) of Farnworth, Lancashire, who emigrated to America in the 1700s, and resided in Chester, Pennsylvania. He a direct descendant of Gawain Atherton.

His cousin, Gibson Atherton, was a member of the U.S. House of Representatives in the 19th century representing Ohio.

His distant Atherton relatives include Bobby Atherton and Tommy Atherton.

== See also ==
American frontier - Lewis E. Atherton has two titles listed.

== Bibliography ==
- Missouri Alumnus 48 (April 1960):2-3,8 “Distinguished Scholar: Lewis E. Atherton”
- Goodrich, James W. “Lewis E. Atherton (1905-1989) Missouri Historical Review 83 (July 1989):p.448-58
