= Mary Atherton Richards =

American educator

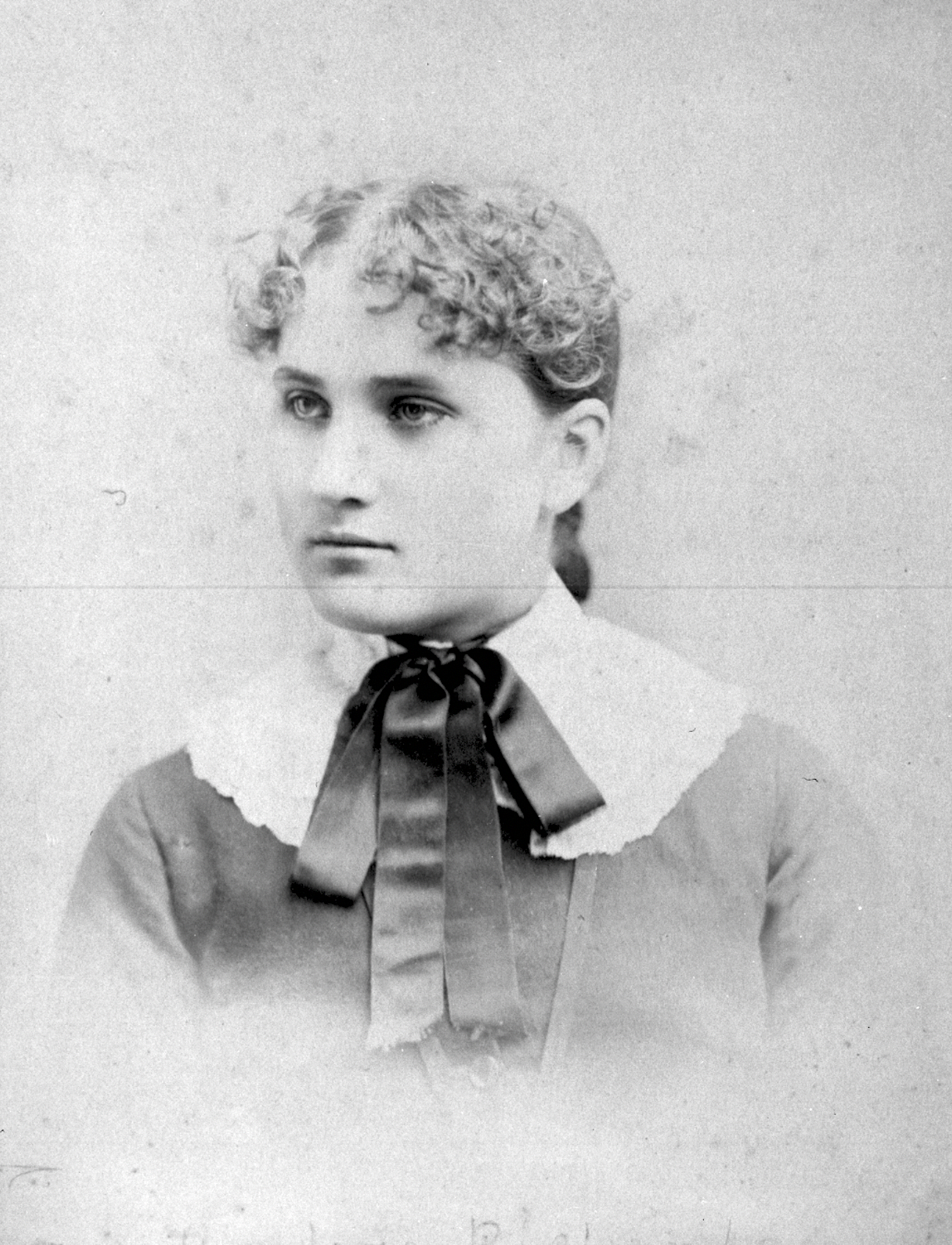
- Mary Atherton Richards in her youth
- Born: Mary Cushing Atherton; April 21, 1869; Honolulu, Hawai'i, U.S.
- Died: April 18, 1951 (age 81); Honolulu, Hawai'i, U.S.
- Occupation(s): Educator, clubwoman, philanthropist
- Father: Joseph Ballard Atherton
- Relatives: Amos Starr Cooke (grandfather); Juliette Montague Cooke (grandmother); Frank E. Midkiff (son-in-law); Charles Montague Cooke (uncle)

Mary Cushing Atherton Richards (April 21, 1869 – April 18, 1951) was an American educator, clubwoman, and philanthropist, based in Honolulu.

== Early life and education ==
Richards was born in Honolulu, the daughter of Joseph Ballard Atherton and Juliette Montague Cooke Atherton. Her maternal grandparents were missionary teachers Amos Starr Cooke and Juliette Montague Cooke. Her father was president of Castle & Cooke Ltd., and involved in banking, telephones, railroads, and schools in Hawaii.

== Career ==
Richards was founder and leader of the Morning Music Club of Honolulu, and active with the Women's Board of Missions for the Pacific Islands, especially on temperance, infant health, and school health programs. She was president of the Free Kindergarten and Children's Aid Association of Honolulu. She served on commissions of the Hawaii Department of Public Education and helped establish the first high schools on Kaua'i and Maui, and the Hawaii School for the Deaf and Blind. She and her husband donated buildings to the YMCA and the Punahou School, and established a YWCA retreat center on Oahu named Kokokahi. She was a member of the Daughters of Hawaii, the Daughters of the American Revolution, and the Punahou Parent-Teacher Association. She was president of the J. B. Atherton Estate, Ltd. In 1945, a scholarship was established to honor her and her husband's work in education, and a chapel was dedicated in their memory in 1960.

== Publications ==
- The Hawaiian Chiefs' Children's School, 1839–1850 (1937)

== Personal life and legacy ==
In 1892, Mary Atherton married New Jersey-born educator and missionary Theodore Richards. They had five children: Ruth, Joseph Atherton, Muriel, Herbert, and Mary Theodora (Polly). Her husband died in 1948, and she died in 1951, at the age of 81, in Honolulu.

Richards left a quarter of her estate to fund the Friend Peace Scholarship Fund. The Theodore Richards Papers are in the Kamehameha Schools Archives. In 2021, the Mary Atherton Richards House on the campus of the University of Hawai'i at Mānoa was demolished for a new facility.
