= Atherton High School (England) =

Location
- Hamilton Street; Atherton, Greater Manchester, M46 0AY; England; 53.5214°N 2.4929°W

Information
- Type: Free school
- Motto: Respect Responsibility Ambition
- Religious affiliation: Christianity
- Established: 2012
- Trust: Education Partnership Trust
- Department for Education URN: 138233 Tables
- Ofsted: Reports
- Headteacher: Leanne Turner
- Gender: Mixed
- Age: 11 to 16
- Website: https://www.athertonhigh.com/

Atherton High School (formerly Atherton Community School & Hesketh Fletcher CofE High School) is a mixed Secondary school and sixth form located in Atherton in the Metropolitan Borough of Wigan, Greater Manchester, England. It is formally designated as a Christian faith school. The school opened in 2012 for 11-year-old (Year 7) pupils, but expanded over the next few years to become a full secondary school. The school's sixth form opened in 2013, It was then closed in 2017 due to low student count and financial issues. in

The school was the first free school to open in Greater Manchester, and was established after the Chapel Street and Atherton Community Consortium had campaigned for the opening of a new secondary school in the Atherton area. In 2020 the school was transferred to the Education Partnership Trust and was renamed Atherton High School.

== Admissions ==
Where admissions are oversubscribed, priority is given to children living closest to the school.
