= Robert Atherton Edwin =

Royal Navy officer and meteorologist

Robert Atherton Edwin (16 August 1839 – 15 July 1911) was a meteorologist and weather forecaster, who after a career in the Royal Navy was instrumental in the establishment of the New Zealand Meteorological Office, becoming its first director in 1900 and remaining in post until 1907. He was also an accomplished artist, specializing in marine art.

== Early life ==
Edwin was born in Camden Town, London, the son of Felix Edwin, a senior commander in the Royal Navy, and his wife, Marianne Atherton of Walton Hall, Liverpool. His father had toured Southern France with his future brother–in– law, a Royal Navy Officer, Lt Bertram Mitford Atherton after the Napoleonic Wars. His maternal cousins were the Mitford family. His parents had married in Belgium.

He attended Wimborne Minster Grammar School in Dorset, as did his younger brother, Edward Edwin, who also followed the family tradition by joining the Royal Navy. His brother's journal describes life aboard HMS Aboukir (1848) during the outbreak of Yellow Fever during 1873–74. His brother later became the Royal Navy Paymaster Jamaica.

== Royal Navy career ==
Edwin joined the Royal Navy as a cadet in January 1853 on HMS Victory, months prior to her sinking in April 1854. He went on serve onboard HMS Firebrand (1842). As a midshipman on HMS Albion during the Crimean War, he was wounded at the siege of Sevastopol in October 1854. Items during this time have been donated to the Museum of New Zealand.

With HMS Elk on the China Station, he took part in the capture of Guangzhou in 1857. He also served in the Pacific in the Elk and on HMS Salamander and HMS Falcon on the Australia Station. It was as an officer of the Falcon that he surveyed the volcanic crater of White Island on 17 March 1868.

In 1869 the Merchant Shipping (Colonial) Act made it possible for colonies such as New Zealand to grant certificates of competency to ships' officers that would be recognised throughout the empire. Edwin was offered a special appointment to the Marine Department as an additional examiner of masters and mates; he retired from the Royal Navy with the rank of commander during February 1871 and on the 18th of the same month took up his new post in the New Zealand public service. In addition to examining, he was to assist in the general work of the department, undertake marine surveying and supervise compass adjusting.

== Meteorological career ==
Edwin was made responsible for the newly instituted weather-reporting and storm-signalling section of the Marine department at the start of 1874. Edwin, who had studied meteorology in the Royal Navy, was influenced by the tradition of practical weather science of which Admiral Robert FitzRoy and the American, Matthew Fontaine Maury, were the most distinguished contemporary exponents. Spurred by the need for timely weather information that would enhance maritime safety, FitzRoy had begun daily forecasts from his Board of Trade office in London in 1860. By this date the forecasting of general weather patterns had become practicable. The use of reliable barometers enabled the accurate measurement of variations in air pressure – the fundamental principle in the assessment of weather changes. These measurements were taken simultaneously at widely separated weather stations, and by means of the electric telegraph were rapidly transmitted to a central office. There FitzRoy's synoptic weather chart allowed the observations to be collated in a coherent visual form from which forecasts could be made.

In October 1866, the New Zealand government scientist James Hector, in his capacity as inspector of meteorological stations, proposed telegraphing weather information daily to and from a network of 13 localities to assist shipmasters in Marine weather forecasting for navigation. In each place the collected data were to be displayed to the public; however, Hector did not include weather forecasting from a central office. This limited scheme was implemented in 1869 but was soon found to be unreliable. Edwin had been asked to consult with Hector, and the Royal Society of New Zealand, and in January 1874 Edwin proposed an expanded scheme of weather forecasting and storm warnings to the commissioner of customs (nominal head of the Marine Department), volunteering to set it up. This was approved, with Edwin accepting his new duties on 12 March. His first forecast was made in early May 1874 and a stock of mercury barometers was promptly ordered from the Met Office to improve the accuracy of observations.

=== Expansion of weather sections in New Zealand ===
By 1876, Edwin's weather-reporting section was functioning along the lines set out by FitzRoy in his 1863 manual, the Weather Book. The original 17 observer stations had increased to 28 and extended from Auckland to The Bluff. Most were at ports, with the harbourmasters acting as weather observers; the co-operation of the Telegraph Department was assured. Every day, observations of the general weather together with wind direction and force, the barometer reading, the shade temperature, and the sea conditions were telegraphed to Wellington. From these observations, Edwin prepared synoptic charts, and dispatched the forecast for the next 24 hours to each station and to the principal newspapers. If high winds were predicted, storm warnings were sent to the ports. Later, with growing experience of the isobaric patterns typical of New Zealand and making use of Australian weather reports received daily via the trans-Tasman cable from 1876, Edwin was able to classify the associated weather systems and apply empirical rules for forecasting. His predictions were heavily reliant on charting the passage of depressions and their accompanying 'backing winds'.

Official support for the new weather section in its initial years was lukewarm. This was rather surprising in a country where the weather systems were oceanic in origin and in which the economy was critically dependent on shipping activity, with wrecks and strandings occurring frequently. The drive for the All Red Line that commenced in 1858 and would eventually link the British Empire was the eventual turning point, from which New Zealand only started benefiting from in 1876. Prior to this, the weather-reporting section in New Zealand had been established as an 'experimental system' only, and in 1877 a parliamentary committee of inquiry found the work of the section 'to be of value' but was uncertain about continuing to fund it beyond a further year. To justify the work of the section Edwin constantly stressed its value by citing the opinions of the 'officers who receive warnings and not that of the officer who issues them.'

In 1880–81, the weather-reporting section was absorbed into the Meteorological Department at the Colonial Museum under Hector's direction. In 1906, meteorology and the weather section were combined, with Edwin as head, and assimilated by the Marine Department. There were some differences between Hector and Edwin in the 1870s and 1880s over meteorological theories and the inter-colonial organisation of weather reporting, but Edwin's competence as a weather forecaster does not seem to have been seriously questioned and he remained responsible for the country's forecasts for over 30 years. His forecasting generally won public approval and his bulletins soon came to be regarded throughout New Zealand as an important item of daily news. When he retired as director of the Meteorological Office on 31 March 1909, his staff had expanded to four and daily forecasts were being sent to over 90 towns as well as to the newspapers and to selected lighthouses. He was succeeded by Reverend Daniel Cross Bates (1868–1954) in 1908, who had served under Edwin for a number of years.

Edwin also published a number of scientific papers on his forecasting methods and on atmospheric circulation in the southern hemisphere. He had joined the Wellington Philosophical Society in 1872, and later became a fellow of the Royal Meteorological Society prior to 1884.

== Later life ==
Short and dapper, with a closely trimmed full beard, Edwin in his appearance reflected the meticulous care he gave to his forecasting. He was prominent in Wellington bowling circles and interested himself in the welfare of veteran soldiers and sailors.

He served as a Special constable in the New Zealand Police until the 1890s.

== Personal life ==
He married Amelia Charlotte Bridgen at Wellington, the third daughter of the Assistant-Commissary General of Van Diemen's Land, Charles Bridgen on 26 July 1871 at Old St Paul's, Wellington. After a short retirement he died at his home in Wellington on 15 July 1911, survived by his wife, three daughters and a son. He is buried at Karori Cemetery.

His son, Alexander Mitford Edwin (1873–1937) became a prominent Union Steam Ship Company master.
