= James Atherton (footballer, born 1872) =

English footballer

Personal information
- Date of birth: 1872
- Place of birth: Lancaster, England
- Position: Left half

Senior career*
Years	Team	Apps	(Gls)
- South Shore
- Blackpool
1895	Leicester Fosse	2	(0)
- Kettering
- New Brompton
- * Club domestic league appearances and goals

James Atherton (1872 – after 1895) was a footballer who played in the Football League for Leicester Fosse. He also played for South Shore, Blackpool, Kettering and New Brompton.
