= William H. Atherton =

Canadian historian

William Henry Atherton, MBE (November 15, 1867 – July 6, 1950) was a British-born Canadian writer, historian, academic and scholar from Montreal, Quebec.

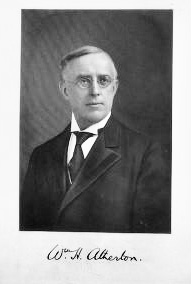
William H. Atherton

== Early life ==
He was born on November 15, 1867, in Salford, Lancashire, the son of Joseph Atherton and Sarah Ann Nicholls. He lived at 320 Regent Road, Salford. His father is recorded as being a plumber and a glazier in the 1871 census.

Atherton spent some of his youth in the hamlet of Heigham, near Norwich. He was educated at Stonyhurst College, a Roman Catholic school, adhering to the Jesuit tradition, which came under the Roman Catholic Diocese of Salford of which he was a member.

== Academic career ==
Upon completing his degree in philosophy, he began his career as a teacher in England and Wales. He taught classics at Stonyhurst College. In the 1891 census he is recorded as being a 23 year old teacher at Stonyhurst. During this time his parents and siblings continued to live in Norfolk.

He spent several years in postgraduate study. In the census of 1901, he is recorded as being a theological student at St Beuno's Jesuit Spirituality Centre, known locally as St Beuno's College, in Denbighshire.

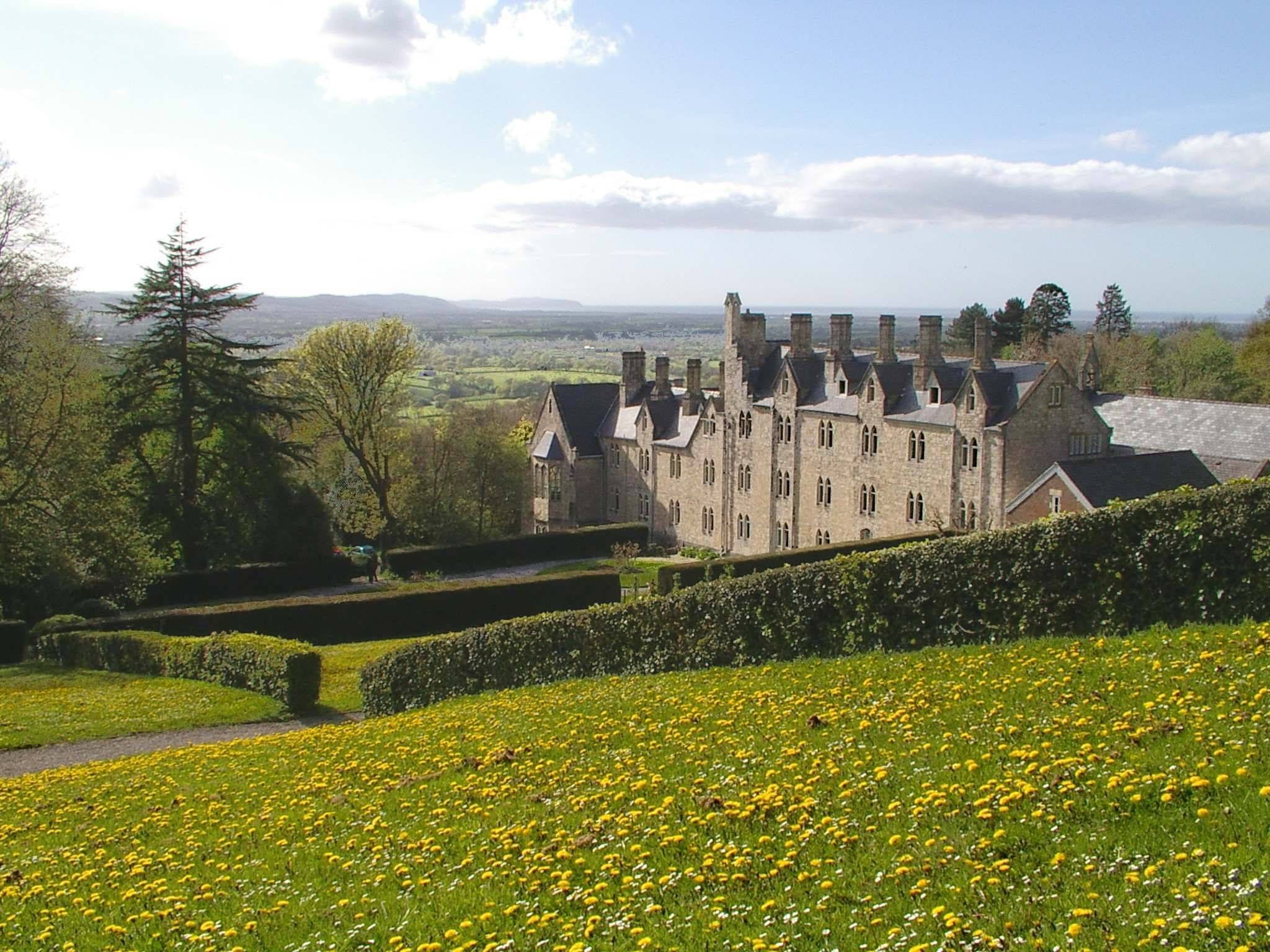
St Beuno's College, Denbighshire (which was previously known as the Welsh County of Flint)

He then taught classics at Beaumont College in Berkshire.

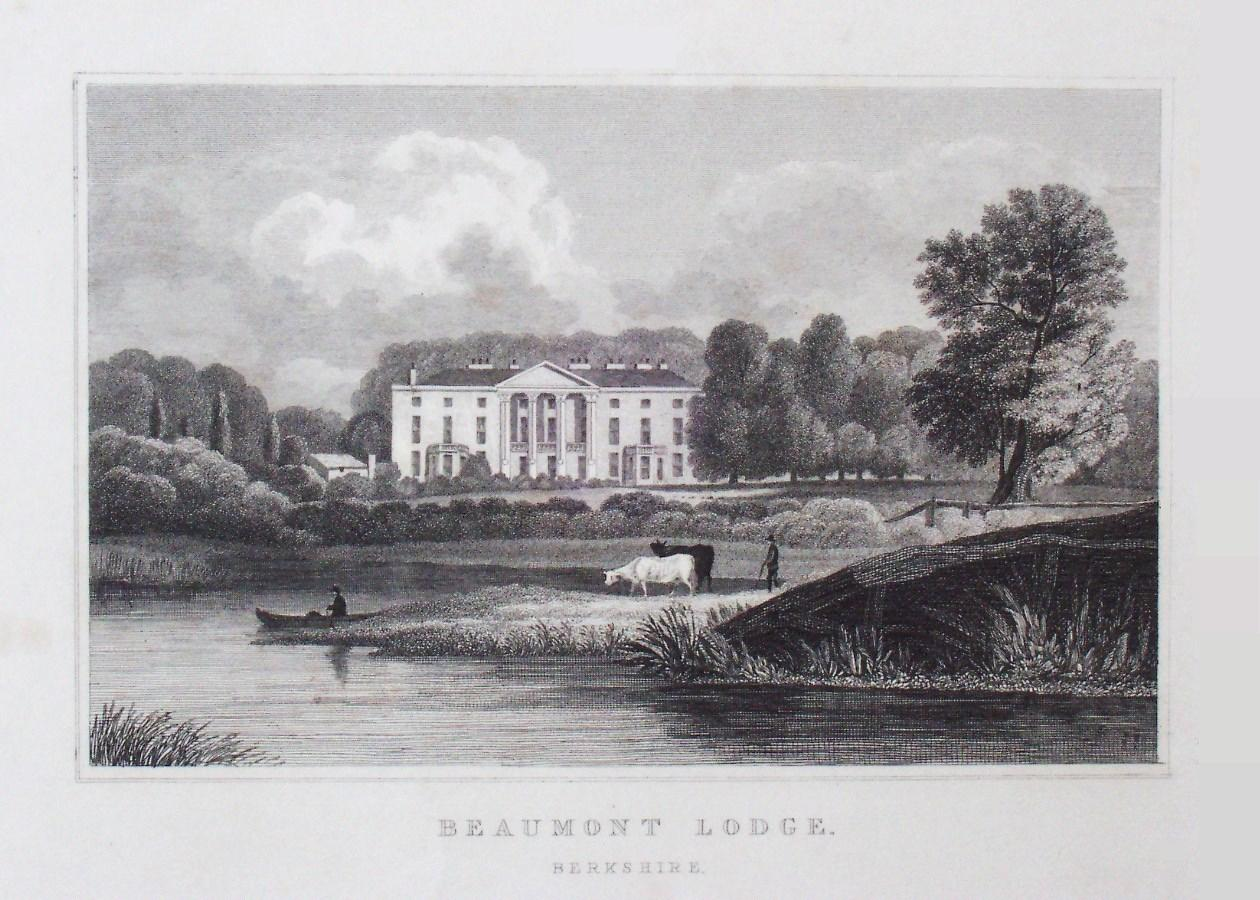
Beaumont College, prior to becoming a Jesuit College in the 18th century

Atherton emigrated to Canada in 1907, to follow his elderly parents who had emigrated to Calgary, the previous year, and for one year taught at a school in Alberta, however he soon relocated to Quebec, where he became a member of the faculty at both Loyola College, an anglophone Jesuit college and Collège Notre-Dame du Sacré-Cœur from 1908 until 1918.

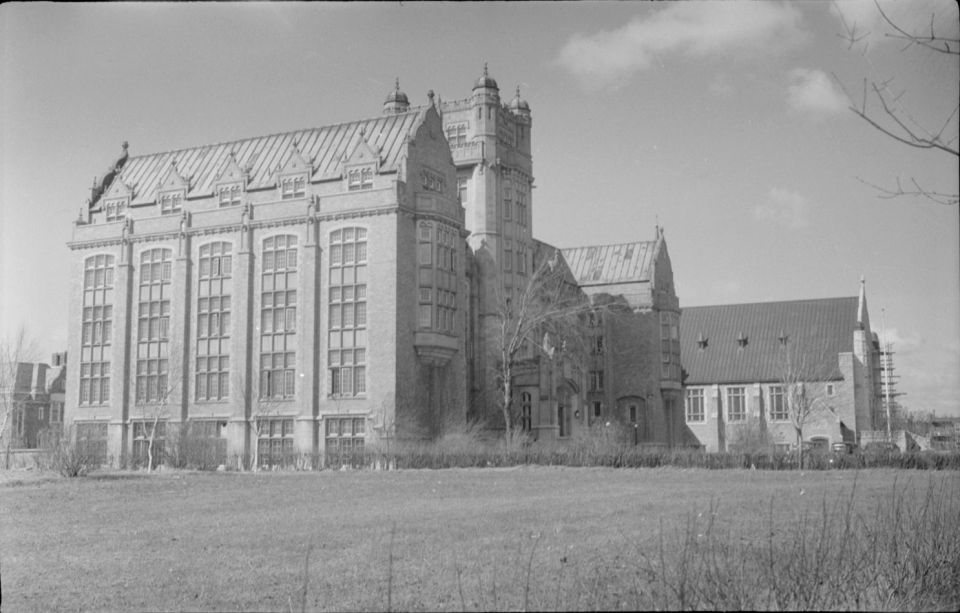
Loyolla College, Montreal

Collège Notre-Dame du Sacré-Cœur

In 1918 he reoriented his teaching career as a professor of English literature, initially at the Laval University of Quebec - Montreal annex, which when chartered, became the University of Montreal, where he would remain a faculty member until his retirement in 1948.

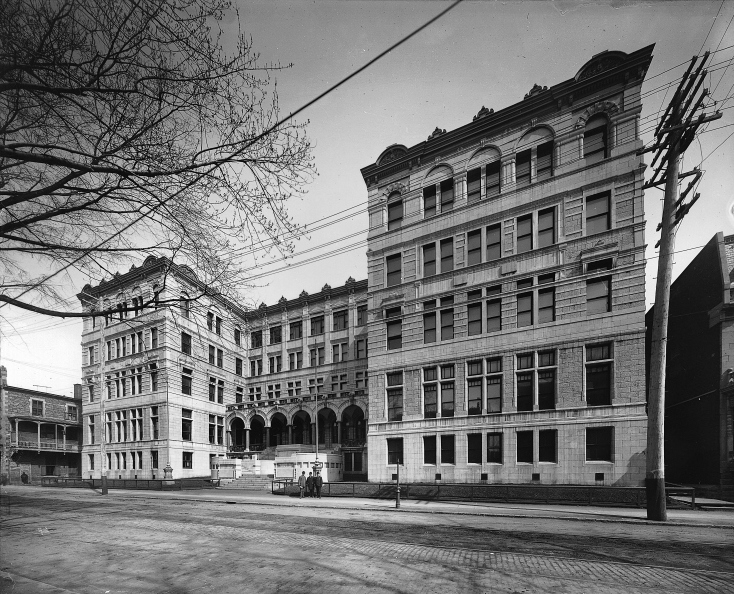
Université Laval in Montreal in 1905

He also taught at the Marguerite Bourgeoys College.

On April 17, 1948, he was honored at a retirement dinner held at University Women's Club. At least nine friends and associates delivered their reminiscences. One of his former pupils described him as:

“a Catholic layman in action according to the best principles laid down by the present Pontiff”

For over twenty years he was on the examining board for Latin and letters for medical students at McGill University, Laval and the Université de Montréal.

== Personal ==
Atherton remained dedicated to his faith. He visited England and mainland Europe, as a representative of the Catholic Sailors Club of Montreal. He never married.

He was aligned to the English Province of the Jesuits and visited his country of birth numerous times. In 1918 at the end of his term at Loyola College, he travelled to British Guiana, to teach at St. Stanislaus College, which at the time came under the jurisdiction of the English Province of the Jesuits.

== Writer and historian ==
His boyhood was spent in the cathedral town of Norwich, and it was his impressions of the old cathedral and the treasures in its archives that he decided to embark on a career of historical research.

=== Author ===
He was an active member of Montreal's literary community, writing fifty books. In 1914 he wrote Montreal 1535-1914, published in three volumes. In 1925 he published Old Montréal in the early days of British Canada, 1778-1788. In 1935 he published the History of the harbour front of Montréal since its discovery by Jacques Cartier in 1535. He also collaborated on the four volume work, (as associate editor) in The Storied Province of Quebec and was responsible for writing the volume on Montreal.

=== Broadcaster ===
He was the first in Canada to give broadcast conferences on literature, history and social reforms, this was aired on CFCF, a Montreal radio station from 1945.

== Philanthropy ==
In 1908, the director of Loyola College asked Atherton to remain in Montreal and revive the Catholic Sailors' Club on Common St. He decided to remain in the city and devote his time to the betterment of seafaring men visiting this port. While visiting Montreal during the First World War, the British Prime Minister, David Lloyd George visited the Sailors' Club and commended Atherton for his work among seamen. In 1920, Atherton helped found the Apostleship of the Sea. In 1923, he went to Rome and the Pope Pius XI gave his blessing to the old mission on the waterfront. He retired as the club manager during June 1945 at the age of 78. Atherton was awarded an MBE in 1946, commending his dedication to Catholic Sailors.

=== Trustee ===
He served as the first president of the Dominion Last Post Fund and as a trustee of the Provincial Last Post Fund.

=== Memberships ===
He was a historian of the British Empire Society, the Canadian Catholic Historical Society and the Catholic Historical Society of Montreal.

=== Civic leader ===
His social involvement extended to the municipal scene extended over forty years. Atherton was active on a number of civic and national issues, such as Canada's first exhibition on the protection of childhood in 1911. He was a member of various associations, and was a member of the executive of the City Improvement League, which he helped found in 1909, with the aim of improving the quality of urban life. He was also instrumental in the first cleaning campaign of the city of Montreal.

== Honours ==
- Order of St. Gregory the Great, KSG, a papal order of knighthood
- Most Excellent Order of the British Empire, MBE awarded by George VI on July 1, 1946, for services to the Catholic Sailors Club, Montreal

== Death ==
In later life, Atherton was regarded as a university Professor emeritus, since he was a retired professor actively involved in research. He died on July 6, 1950, at age 82, in Montreal.

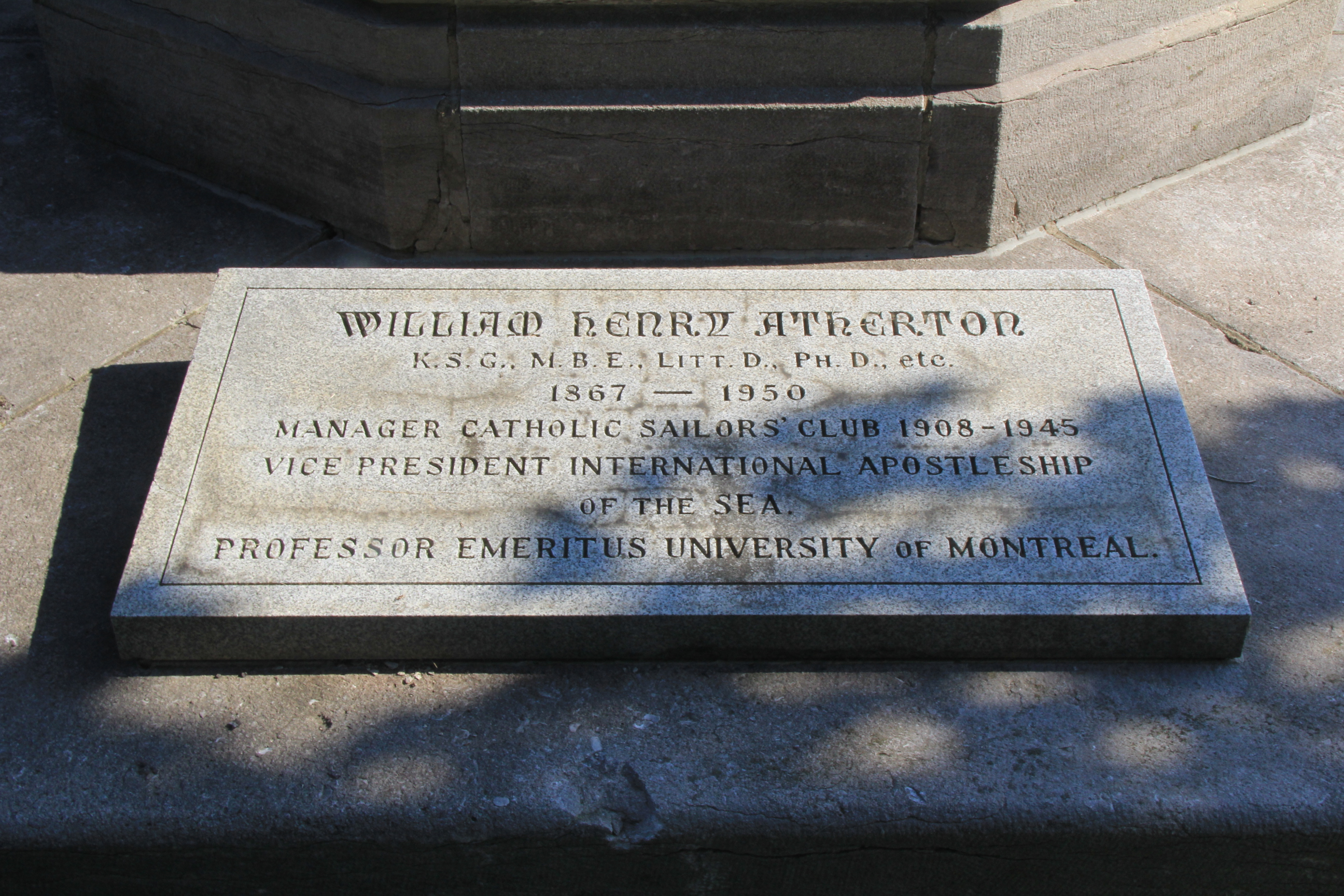
Plaque on William Henry Atherton's monument, Notre-Dame-des-Neiges Montreal

He is buried at the Notre Dame des Neiges Cemetery.

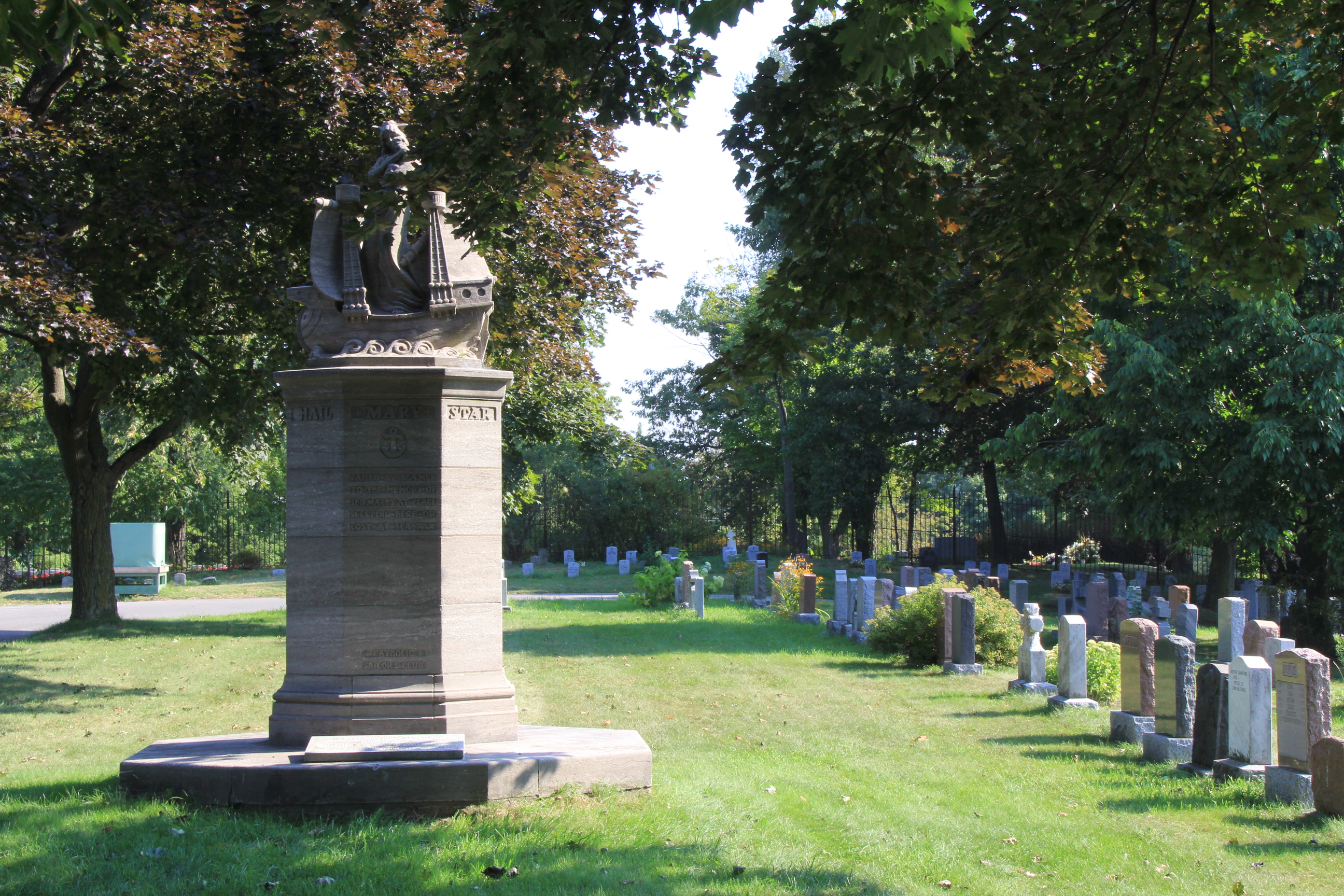
William Henry Atherton's tombstone (or monument), Notre-Dame-des-Neiges Cemetery, Montreal

His obituary was published in The Windsor Star, Ontario and The Ottawa Citizen, which describe him briefly as a noted Montreal historian, educationist and sociologist.

Rue Atherton was named in his honour by the City of Montreal in 1955. This route extends into the Town of Mount Royal.

== Legacy ==
The Williams H. Atherton Award for Excellence in History is presented on an annual basis at Loyola College.

== Ancestry ==
His paternal ancestors were from Wigan, Lancashire. His maternal ancestry was from Yorkshire. His grandfather, William Atherton (1824 – 1898) married Mary Dwyer of Limerick, Ireland.

== Biography ==
- The Macmillan Dictionary of Canadian Biography. Fourth edition. Edited by W. Stewart Wallace. Revised, enlarged, and updated by W.A. McKay. Toronto: Macmillan of Canada, 1978. (MacDCB)

== See also ==
- Jesuit formation
- The story of Mariners House
