= Bobby Atherton =

Welsh footballer

Personal information
- Full name: Robert Atherton
- Date of birth: 29 July 1876
- Place of birth: Bethesda, Wales
- Date of death: 19 October 1917 (aged 41)
- Place of death: North Sea
- Positions: Half back; forward

Senior career*
Years	Team	Apps	(Gls)
- Dalry Primrose
1895–1897	Heart of Midlothian	0	(0)
1897–1903	Hibernian	75	(25)
1903–1906	Middlesbrough	60	(13)
1906	Chelsea	0	(0)

International career
1899–1905	Wales	9	(2)
- * Club domestic league appearances and goals

Robert Atherton (29 July 1876 – 19 October 1917) was a Welsh footballer who played as a half back and forward for Heart of Midlothian, Hibernian, Middlesbrough and Chelsea in the late 1890s and early 1900s. He was capped by Wales at international level.

Bobby Atherton was the son of Samuel Atherton and Ann Williams, and younger sibling of Tommy Atherton.

== Career ==
=== Hibernian ===
Although he was born in north Wales, Atherton grew up in Scotland. After spells with Dalry Primrose juniors and Heart of Midlothian, Atherton signed for Hibernian, at the start of the 1897–98 season. He was a versatile player who could play in a number of positions in midfield and the forward line.

He captained the Hibs side that won the 1902 Scottish Cup, a competition that Hibs did not win again until 2016. Hibs' 1–0 win against Celtic in the Cup Final was thanks in part to Atherton deceiving the Celtic defence by shouting for them to "leave the ball" in a Glaswegian accent. The Celtic defence duly complied, which allowed Andy McGeachen to score the only goal of the game. He then captained the Hibs side that won the 1903 league championship, the first in the club's history. He also played in all of Wales' matches in the 1903 British Home Championship.

=== Middlesbrough ===
Atherton was transferred to Middlesbrough in 1903 and he became the first Middlesbrough player to win international honours. Atherton made 66 appearances in all for Middlesbrough and became club captain.

=== International ===
He won his first cap for Wales while playing for Hibs in a 1899 British Home Championship match against Ireland, and he also played against England that year.

He scored his two international goals while with Middlesbrough. The first was in a 1–1 draw with Scotland at Dens Park, and the second was in a 2–2 draw against Ireland during his 9th and last international appearance.

== Personal life ==
He married Margaret Jane Kirkconnell in Guisborough on 4 January 1904. They had four children.

Atherton retired from playing football after a short spell with Chelsea and he subsequently moved back to Edinburgh, becoming a steward in the Merchant Navy. Atherton was presumed dead in October 1917 after his ship, the SS Britannia (1889), disappeared without trace in the North Sea, either due to a mine or enemy action, potentially from SM UC-75. He is commemorated on the Tower Hill Memorial.

== Ancestry ==
He a direct descendant of Gawain Atherton. His distant Atherton relatives include the American historian Lewis Eldon Atherton and politician, Gibson Atherton.
