= Tommy Atherton =

English footballer

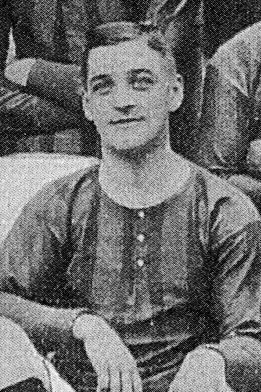
- Atherton while with Brentford in 1903.

Personal information
- Full name: Thomas Henry Atherton
- Date of birth: 8 January 1879
- Place of birth: West Derby, England
- Date of death: 15 September 1954 (aged 75)
- Place of death: Exeter, England
- Position: Outside right

Senior career*
Years	Team	Apps	(Gls)
- Dundee Wanderers
- Hibernian
–1898	Edinburgh Benburb		
1898–1899	Tottenham Hotspur	2	(0)
1899	Dunfermline Juniors		
1899	St Bernard's	6	(0)
1900	Raith Rovers		
1900–1901	Partick Thistle	18	(4)
1901–1902	Dundee	8	(2)
1902–1904	Grimsby Town	2	(0)
1903–1904	→ Brentford (loan)	22	(2)
1904–1905	Motherwell	12	(3)

International career
1901	Scottish League XI	1	(0)
- * Club domestic league appearances and goals

Thomas Henry Atherton (8 January 1879 – 15 September 1954) was an English professional footballer who played in the Scottish League for Partick Thistle, Motherwell, Dundee and St Bernard's as an outside right. He also played in England for Brentford, Tottenham Hotspur and Grimsby Town.

== Personal life ==
Atherton was the son of Samuel Atherton and Ann Williams and was the older brother of footballer Bobby Atherton. Atherton married Rachel Steedman Scott in Morningside in 1903 and they had three children.

== Career statistics ==
Appearances and goals by club, season and competition
Club	Season	League			National cup (Note: Includes FA Cup, Scottish Cup)		Other		Total	
Club	Season	Division	Apps	Goals	Apps	Goals	Apps	Goals	Apps	Goals
Tottenham Hotspur	1898–99	Southern League First Division	2	0	0	0	—		2	0
St Bernard's	1899–1900	Scottish League First Division	6	0	0	0	—		6	0
Partick Thistle	1900–01	Scottish League First Division	18	4	1	0	4 (Note: Appearances in Glasgow Cup)	0	23	4
Dundee	1901–02	Scottish League First Division	8	2	2	0	—		10	2
Grimsby Town	1902–03	First Division	2	0	0	0	—		2	0
Brentford (loan)	1903–04	Southern League First Division	22	2	5	0	—		27	2
Motherwell	1904-05	Scottish League First Division	12	0	3	0	—		15	0
Career total			70	8	11	0	4	0	85	8
