= William Atherton (plantation owner) =

English plantation owner

William Atherton (31 May 1742 – 30 June 1803), was a merchant and wealthy landowner from Lancashire, England, who operated and co-owned sugar plantations in the former Colony of Jamaica. He was a slave owner, as well as an importer of slaves from Africa.

== Early life ==
Atherton was born in Preston, Lancashire, the fourth son of William and Lucy Atherton. He was the son of a successful and wealthy silk mercer. His father was a Preston Alderman, and was elected Mayor of Preston in 1732 and 1738. Prescot history refers to his father having been born in 1715. His father, according to the Walker Art Gallery, lived between 1703 and 1745.

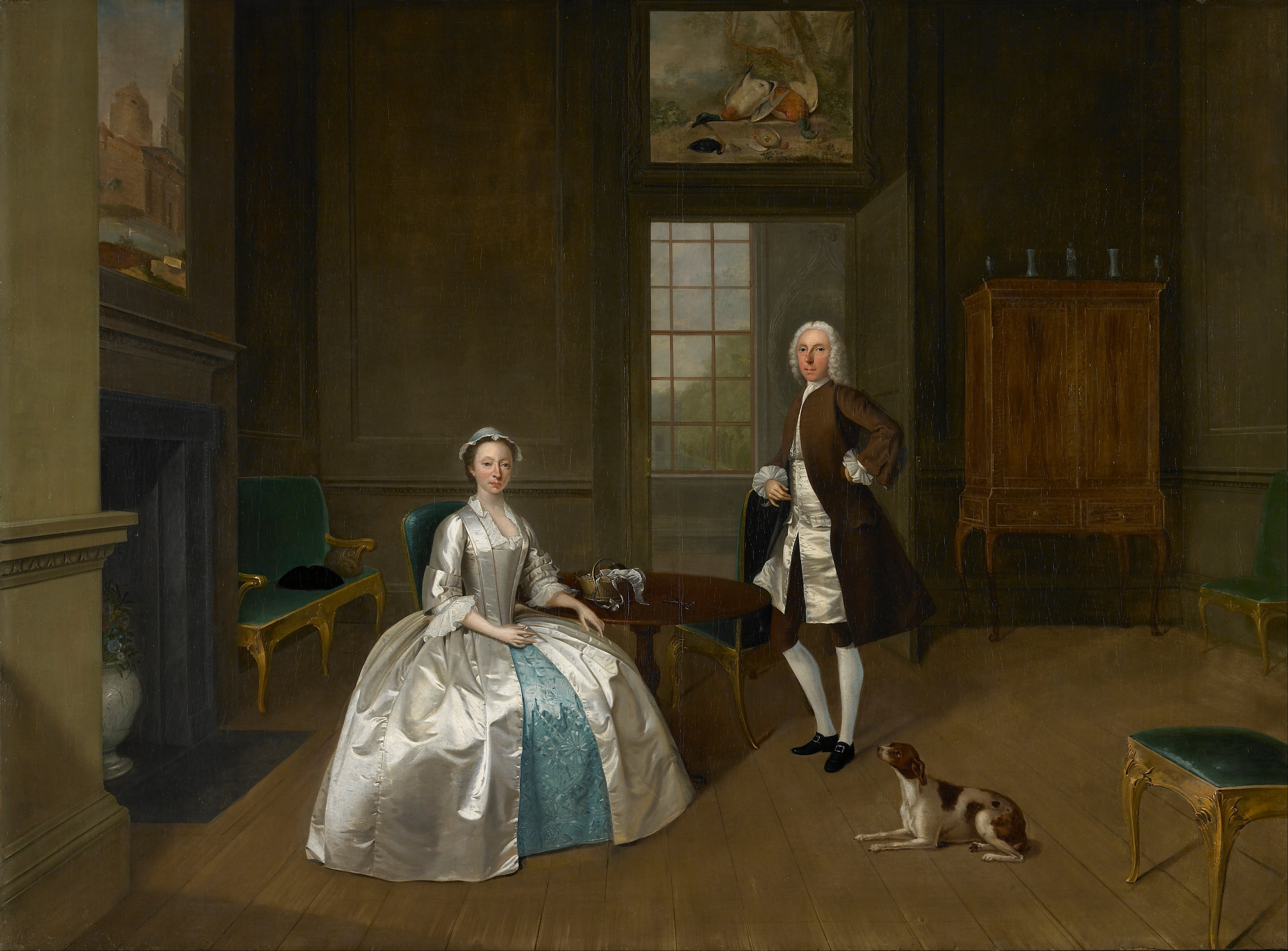
His parents, Mr and Mrs William Atherton by Arthur Devis. Painted in 1744. Walker Art Gallery

Atherton travelled to Jamaica as a merchant and went on to act as the overseer of a sugar plantation. Members of his family had been involved in the Atlantic slave trade since at least 1737, and were known as Liverpool privateers.

His grandfather was John Atherton, a draper. A relative, William Atherton was the rector of St Nicholas Church, Liverpool; known as the Old Church of St Nicks, from 1688 to 1699. Walton Hall was part of this parish and the home of his slave trading guardian-uncle, John Atherton. Another ancestor, Richard Atherton, was the first modern Mayor of Liverpool, who in turn descended from the Athertons of Atherton Hall, Leigh.

== Career ==
His exact date of departure from Liverpool to Jamaica is unknown. When Atherton arrived on the island, he initially established himself as a merchant in Kingston, also operating in the vicinity of Martha Brae and the town of Falmouth, then a thriving seaport. He also served as attorney for William Gale, who owned the Gale Valley Estate, and Edward Hyde, who owned the Swanswick Estate, as well as several other planter families.

At the age of 23, Atherton inherited a share of Green Park Estate from Thomas Southworth in 1765, however the exact relationship between the two has never been established by historians. It is most likely that Thomas Southworth, who was from Preston was either a relative or business associate who employed Atherton, had no immediate family. It is possible that he bequeathed to Atherton, in order to settle upon his gambling debts. Atherton's father and elder brother Richard, a merchant banker had provided mortgages for such enterprises. Southworth may also have been a slowly dying man with long-term injuries following Tacky's War, or had a degree of intimacy with Atherton. One source records a William Atherton being bequeathed the same estate 101 years prior. Most likely a researcher error, however if correct, it could justify why a share was bequeathed to him since his family already had a vested interest in this estate. Hence his decision to relocate to Jamaica, operating under the parameters set by his guardian uncle.

By the late 1760s, Atherton was now the co-owner of various sugar plantations in north western Jamaica. He owned the Green Park Estate in Trelawny Parish and Spring Vale Pen in Saint James, his summer residence. Atherton would have had many investors outside his immediate family. It has been established that he partnered with Peter Holme (1730-1779), a merchant from Liverpool, who was responsible for over 50 slave voyages (known as the Middle Passage) from 1750 onwards. They invested heavily in the Triangular trade. Holme was older than Atherton and had been in partnership with William Davenport (1716-1794) and the former owners of Green Park Estate, Thomas Southworth and John Kennion. As a merchant, Atherton would have been an active shareholder in various Liverpool shipping companies and would have been initially guided by his brothers, John and Richard. Since slave trading enterprises were often agreements limited between just a handful of individuals, Atherton may have been one of the many who financed such ventures as a sleeping partner, whilst based in Jamaica, with his uncle John Atherton, a slave trader with at least 18 voyages, or his subsequent partner, Peter Holme acting as signatories. It would have been in Atherton's interest to partake, since the profitability of his plantation depended on the profits from Jamaican sugar and the supply of able slaves from the African Company of Merchants, and indentured servitude.

Map of Cornwall, Jamaica (1763)

Atherton built a fortress plantation house, as his primary residence on the grounds of the Green Park Estate. Suitable defenses were a requirement mandated by the British colonial authorities, in event of a Spanish attack, or a slave revolt.

Within a short period, Atherton had established himself as one of the wealthiest sugar planters. In order to do this he imported hundreds of slaves from Africa to work in the cane fields and sugar factories of what had become the third largest estate in Trelawny Parish, out of a total of 88 estates. He would move between his estates and properties on the island during the seasons and high humidity. He also owned the Spring Vale Pen Plantation in Saint James parish. He expanded Green Park, by purchasing the adjoining plantations, such as the Bradshaw Estate in 1771. Green Park increased to over 1,315 acres. He constructed a second sugar mill in 1773, complete with a stone windmill, which was supplemented by the power of oxen. It is estimated that his operations in Jamaica continuously had close to 800 people enslaved.

The Green Park Estate expanded, and had a large slave population, operating four field gangs and the slave village numbered over 30 buildings. Atherton spent a great deal of time in England as an absentee landlord, but would visit his plantations frequently. Since the roads to the plantations were often bad, Atherton, like other local planters kept a home on Queen Street in Martha Brae, to be closer to the port and to be able to host shipmaster's and discuss incoming and outgoing cargo.

Sugar from his plantations were packed into large barrels called hogsheads and transported to the port of Falmouth for loading onto a vessel bound for England or North America. It is known that Rum had been distilled at his Spring Vale Pen plantation since at least the 1780s.

The West Indian planter class of which Atherton was part of, was entering a period of economic decline. Atherton left Jamaica for the newly independent United States in 1783, shortly after the Treaty of Paris. It is beyond a doubt that a man of his social status on the island would have departed with his own hand picked slaves for this long voyage. A man of his standing would have owned the ship, which would have been fully laden with goods and merchandise to trade, as well as a great deal of his personal wealth, in preparation for what he hoped this new country would bring even greater fortune. It is also likely that this sea voyage coincided with the trafficking of human cargo from the Caribbean, which he would have considered as part of his personal property, free to sell and trade along the route up to New England.

Atherton would have planned his departure from Falmouth, Jamaica with precision. Prior to becoming an absent landlord, he would have appointed a planting attorney, as well as a hierarchy of estate management to continue to manage his business interests as a planter, sugar merchant and as a slave owner. He retained offices in Kingston, Jamaica to oversee all his enterprises that generated wealth derived from slavery. Such vast fortune allowed him to eventually retire in comfort to his large country estate, Prescot Hall in St Helens in 1787, after residing in the United States for just under a period of 5 years.

A particular Bristol Miscellany is insightful, since it mentions Atherton's Trelawny business associate, John Tharp IV (1744-1804), of Good Hope and Chippenham Park, the largest land owner in Trelawny with over 3,000 slaves. Atherton had sold Tharp land in Trelawny a few years prior. When disposing of land, Atherton would have chosen whether to hold a slave auction or have his own attorney draw up contracts to dispose of any unwanted enslaved workers. This typically involved separating children from their mothers and splitting up couples. Compassion of a plantation owner was unlikely, particularly since the article refers to Atherton being childless. Other anecdotes include how Atherton could now afford to live in England comfortably on £1,000 a year. Both Tharp and Atherton eventually purchased large estates in England in their final years, extracting wealth from the island economy, with years of profit from decades of oversight of enslaved people working on his plantations. It also refers to Atherton's exports into Bristol and mention the poor quality of his sugar and the commodities arrival on board the vessel Good Hope.

During Atherton's final years, between 1791 and 1800, 35 children were recorded as born into slavery in Spring Vale Pen. 48 slaves died and a further 70 were purchased. Green Park Estate had 4 times more slaves than this smaller estate. This period also coincided with the heaviest forced migrations which occurred between 1790 and 1807. The result of such slaving patterns made Jamaica the second most common destination for Igbo people arriving from the Bight of Biafra.

== Personal ==
In 1779 he was appointed as a guardian to the sons of Richard Pennant, 1st Baron Penrhyn in the event of their father's death.

Atherton remained a bachelor until the age of 42. Not only was he focused on his own prosperity, and that of his shareholders, he was politically motivated, seeking higher office in Kingston, Jamaica. However, he was unsuccessful in the elections of 1782 and soon made plans to leave the island.

He settled in Rhode Island in 1783, where he soon married his first known wife, Sarah Brenton Wanton (1751-1787), the widow of Joseph Wanton (1730-1780), a loyalist who served as Deputy Governor of Rhode Island in 1764. Wanton had abandoned his wife and child, after being caught up on the revolutionary war, dying in Manhattan as a loyalist colonel. Sarah had unsuccessfully petitioned the State of Rhode Island to return her former marital home, Hunter House, and other confiscated Wanton properties in Newport, Jamestown, Prudence Island, and Gould Island.

Sarah died at the age of 36, in July 1787, and was buried in Clifton Burying Ground, Newport, Rhode Island within three years of their marriage. They had no surviving offspring. Atherton immediately disposed of his household goods and returned to England with his young stepson, Joseph Wanton. To honour his deceased wife, he had a memorial tablet placed inside Trinity Church, Rhode Island in November 1788.

In 1789 in Prescot Parish Church, he married Elizabeth Sephton (1755-1831), the daughter of his deceased father-in-law John Sephton, of Ormskirk and a relative of Henry Sephton. They had no children and it is assumed Atherton returned once again to Jamaica. In 1790 and 1796 he is listed in the Jamaica Almanac as a Commissioner for taking affidavits of the Supreme Court in Kingston, Jamaica.

His stepson, Joseph Brenton Wanton was enrolled at Manchester Grammar School in 1799. Joseph's son was named Joseph Atherton Wanton, in honour of his stepfather.

Atherton's final years were spent at Prescot Hall, where he died on 25 June 1803, at the age of 61. He was buried in Prescot Parish Church. A marble slab by Sir Richard Westmacott is dedicated in his memory, surmounted with a family crest, with the motto clarior e tenebris (brighter after the darkness).

Atherton died without any known offspring. His estate was valued at £100,000 and included paintings by Gerard ter Borch and other notable artists. He bequeathed a one-off payment of £5,000, and an annuity of £2,000 per annum to his second wife Elizabeth who died in 1831. His will also mentions a bequest to his stepson, the Revered Joseph Brenton Wanton (c. 1777–1853). Atherton's married sisters, Mary, Catherine and Elizabeth also benefited. An organ was gifted to Prescot Parish Church by his widow in his memory.

Mary Southworth of Preston, of mixed black African and white European ancestry, was either a mistress or his offspring and is mentioned in his will. However, it is most likely that she was the daughter of Thomas Southworth, the original owner of the Green Park plantation and an African slave mother, or Atherton's own child, named in the honour of his deceased friend. This was not an unusual situation for slave owners returning to their homeland. A precedent had already been set years prior within the circles of gentry. In 1765, John Lindsay returned to England with Dido Elizabeth Belle, a child he fathered on his plantation. None of Mary Southworth's descendants have been traced.

His papers are held in Lancashire Archives.

== Family ==
His uncle, John Atherton of Hanover Street, Liverpool, purchased Walton Hall, set in 300 acres in 1746, and was built on the remains of a 14th-century moated hall. John was involved in the African slave trade relocating from Preston in 1716. At least 18 slave voyages between 1737 and 1757 are on record. John died in Gloucester in 1786. Walton Hall, was sold by his son and heir, Colonel John Joseph Atherton, in 1802 to Thomas Leyland, who was also highly involved in the African slave trade.

His brother, Henry Atherton (1740-1816), a notable barrister, helped further the career of John Scott, 1st Earl of Eldon. He married Ann Byrom, the granddaughter of John Byrom. They had 2 daughters, Eleanora and Lucy who inherited and made their economic gain from the proceeds of over one hundred years of slavery. Eleanora Atherton eventually inherited her younger sister, Lucy Willis estate at Halsnead Hall in Whiston, thus increasing her own share of the Jamaican estates, and was recorded as being one of the wealthiest women in England when she died in 1870.

== Green Park Estate ==
Atherton's largest co-owned sugar plantation, one of the oldest plantations in Trelawny parish, dated back to shortly after 1655, with the Invasion of Jamaica by the English, when Oliver Cromwell first granted land to James Bradshaw, the son of John Bradshaw, one of the regicides who signed the death warrant of King Charles I. Adjoining lands were granted to the Barrett family by King Charles II in 1660. Over one hundred years later, Thomas Southworth, a merchant from Kingston in partnership with John Kennion, a kinsman of Edward Kennion, changed the name of the estate from Green Pond to Green Park, and started to transform it from being a cattle farm, into a large sugar plantation. He died shortly after he commenced construction of the main residence in 1764. The estate was bequeathed to Atherton, then a Kingston merchant in 1765. The estate was fully functioning producing sugar, rum and holding livestock. It was Atherton who completed the build of the main residence and subsequently enlarged what is presently known as Green Park Great House.

At the front of Green Park Great House are two marble plaques on either side of the front door. One plaque says, "Green Park Plantation Manor" and the other, "Built in 1764 by William Atherton".

All plantations would have had a hierarchy. Robert Grant was already an overseer when Atherton took co-ownership with Peter Holme of Liverpool. Atherton did not change this immediately. He is likely to have been concerned about profits than welfare of the hundreds of slaves he now owned. Francis Falshaw assumed the role in 1768, and was replaced by Atherton's appointment of Christopher Forsyth in 1779. Edmund Eccleston was overseer from 1782 to 1791, followed by William Fairclough from 1792 to 1808.

It was not only Atherton and his original partner, Holme and his descendants who extracted wealth from this plantation. His brother, Richard Atherton (1738-1804), a Preston woollen draper and one of the founders of the Preston Old Bank had also invested heavily into the Green Park Estate. He married Mary Griffiths in 1776 and lived at Green Bank Farm in Kirkham and had 6 children. During this period the small town was known for the manufacture of sailcloth. Richard's sons, John and Edward were the initial beneficiaries of Green Park Estate and nearby Spring Vale Pen.

The estate was surveyed by James Robertson in 1793. It also appears on a map of 1804 complete with windmill. In 1811 Alexander Stevenson and Nicholas Smith recorded that of the 1,315 acre estate, 400 acres were apportioned for growing sugar cane. The estate had capacity to produce around 400 hogsheads of sugar a year.

In 1816 Green Park Estate and nearby Spring Vale Pen had recorded a total of 795 chattel slaves. The Jamaican estates were then bequeathed by Edward Atherton to another member of the family. When runaways occurred and the overseer placed advertisements for their return. One such example from 1810 sought the return of "Lust", a Portuguese slave, with his body markings clearly described. In the Jamaica Almanac of 1824 Spring Vale Pen had 571 head of cattle and 186 slaves.

Green Park Estate was eventually divided amongst the daughters of his brother, Henry Atherton (1740–1816), a barrister, and his cousin, Colonel John Joseph Atherton of Walton Hall, Liverpool, the son of John Atherton, his slave trader uncle, who died in 1786 who had become brother in law to James Allan Park.

The heirs of Eleanora Atherton retained ownership of the Green Park Estate until 1910.

=== Slave Compensation Act 1837 ===
Atherton's nieces, Eleanora Atherton and Lucy, the wife of Richard Willis, were entitled to claim for the compensation for the freeing of 544 slaves from the Green Park Estate and 182 slaves from Spring Vale Estate. Both nieces were compensated under the Slave Compensation Act 1837.

Payments of the bonds to the descendants of creditors was only finalised in 2015 when the British Government decided to modernise the gilt portfolio. As a consequence, the UK taxpayer was effectively paying for the compensation of British slave owners until 2015.

== See also ==
- Centre for the Study of the Legacies of British Slave-ownership
- Igbo people in the Atlantic slave trade
- Indentured servitude
- Slavery in Britain
- Slavery at common law
- Early Caribbean Digital Archive - Northeastern University
- Georgian Society of Jamaica
- International Slavery Museum
