= Green Park Estate, Jamaica =

Plantation in Jamaica

Coordinates: 18°30′12.8″N 77°44′33.5″W

Green Park Estate was one of several sugar plantations owned by William Atherton and his heirs. It was located in Trelawny Parish, south of Falmouth, Jamaica. By the early nineteenth century, at least 533 people were enslaved there producing mainly sugar and rum.

== History ==
Green Park Estate was one of the largest and oldest sugar plantations in Trelawny parish, dating back to 1655, with the Invasion of Jamaica by the English, when Oliver Cromwell first granted land to James Bradshaw, the son of John Bradshaw, one of the regicides who signed the death warrant of King Charles I. Adjoining lands were granted to the Barrett family by King Charles II in 1660.

Among the earliest owners was George Sinclair of Saint Ann Parish who acquired the estate around 1740.

In the 1760s Thomas Southworth, a merchant from Kingston in partnership with John Kennion, a kinsman of Edward Kennion, changed the name of the estate from Green Pond to Green Park, and started to transform it from being a cattle farm, into a large sugar plantation. He died shortly after he commenced construction of the main residence in 1764. The estate was bequeathed to William Atherton, a Kingston merchant. The estate was already fully functioning producing sugar, rum and holding livestock.

Map of Cornwall, Jamaica (1763)

Atherton built a fortress plantation house, as his primary residence on the grounds of the Green Park Estate. Suitable defenses were a requirement mandated by the British colonial authorities, in event of a Spanish attack, or a slave revolt. He purchased the adjoining plantations, such as the Bradshaw Estate in 1771, increasing Green Park Estate to over 1,315 acres (532 ha). He constructed a second sugar mill in 1773, complete with a stone windmill, which was supplemented by the power of oxen. It is estimated that his operations in Jamaica continuously had close to 800 people enslaved. Green Park had now become the third largest estate in Trelawny Parish, out of a total of 88 estates. The capacity of the plantation continued to expand. It had a larger slave population, and the overseer operated four field gangs. The workers village numbered over 30 buildings. Green Park resembled a large village or small town, with an industrial-scale agricultural and manufacturing production compound, and a workers village, where movement, and expression was tightly supervised.

Atherton would spend a great deal of time in England as an absentee landlord, however visited his Green Park frequently. Since the roads to the plantations were often bad, he preferred to keep a home on Queen Street in Martha Brae. He completed the build of the main residence and subsequently enlarged what is presently known as Green Park Great House. At the front of Green Park Great House are two marble plaques on either side of the front door. One plaque says, "Green Park Plantation Manor" and the other, "Built in 1764 by William Atherton".

All plantations would have had a hierarchy. Most of the enslaved were forced into field work in a three-tiered gang system, where different tasks were given, dependent on the supervisors perceived physical ability of an enslaved person. The first gang consisted of the fittest field workers. These younger men and women were forced to do the most exhausting work, such as cutting sugarcane. The second gang consisted of people who were no longer physically fit enough to do the most physically strenuous work, due to either aging or injury. The third gang consisted of young children and elderly enslaved men and women who would typically take jobs that required lower physical strength.

Robert Grant was already an overseer when Atherton took co-ownership with Peter Holme of Liverpool. Atherton did not change this immediately. He is likely to have been concerned about profits than welfare of the hundreds of slaves he now owned. Francis Falshaw assumed the role in 1768, and was replaced by Atherton's appointment of Christopher Forsyth in 1779. Edmund Eccleston was overseer from 1782 to 1791, followed by William Fairclough from 1792 to 1808. Each overseer would have handed out a fair share of reprimands, ordered beatings, torture or murder. Each overseer had different traits. Some would have treated those enslaved in a more humane manner, and some would have committed great sin, be it of their own accord, or simply following orders of the plantation owner. Other trades such as blacksmithing, masonry and carpentry were integral to the plantation's operation. There were also many enslaved people, often women, who were required to take on domestic roles in the Great House, working in the kitchens, as maidservants, or as washerwomen.

The West Indian planter class of which Atherton was part of, was entering a period of economic decline. Atherton left Jamaica for the newly independent United States in 1783, shortly after the Treaty of Paris. He retained offices in Kingston, Jamaica to oversee all his enterprises that generated wealth derived from slavery. Such vast fortune allowed him to eventually retire in comfort to his large country estate, Prescot Hall in St. Helens in 1787, after residing in the United States for just under a period of 5 years.

Atherton's elder brother, Richard, a Preston woolen draper and banker had also invested heavily into Green Park. His sons, John and Edward were the initial beneficiaries of Green Park Estate and nearby Spring Vale Pen.

The estate was surveyed by James Robertson in 1793. It also appears on a map of 1804 complete with windmill. In 1811 Alexander Stevenson and Nicholas Smith recorded that of the 1,315 acre estate, 400 acres were apportioned for growing sugar cane. The estate had capacity to produce around 400 hogsheads of sugar a year.

In 1816, Green Park Estate and nearby Spring Vale Pen under Atherton ownership had recorded a total of 795 chattel slaves. Green Park was then bequeathed by Edward Atherton to another member of the family. When runaways occurred and the overseer placed advertisements for their return. One such example from 1810 sought the return of "Lust", a Portuguese slave, with his body markings clearly described. Rum had been distilled at Spring Vale Pen since at least the 1780s.

Green Park Estate was eventually divided amongst the daughters of his brother, Henry Atherton (1740–1816), a barrister, and his cousin, Colonel John Joseph Atherton of Walton Hall, Liverpool, the son of John Atherton, his slave trader uncle, who died in 1786 who had become brother in law to James Allan Park.

An estate journal taken between the 6 – 10 January 1823, outlines a number of young children and infants within Green Park's enslaved population. This journal includes the enslaved mothers name. At this time there were four children born to enslaved women at Green Park; David Barrett, whose mother was Ann, Charles Barrow, whose mother was Susan, Sally Campbell, whose mother was Sarah, and Olive Richards, whose mother was Peggy.

Eleanora Atherton became a co-proprietor in 1823. It is unknown as to whether she sought to better the living and working conditions on these plantations for the 800 slaves she now jointly owned with her sister Lucy Willis. While Atherton, a spinster, was habitually seen traveling in a sedan chair around Manchester, the people upon whom her wealthy lifestyle depended were engaged in a wide range of forced labour at Green Park. In the Jamaica Almanac of 1824 Spring Vale Pen had 571 head of cattle and 186 slaves.

The Baptist War, also known as the Sam Sharp Rebellion, the Christmas Rebellion, the Christmas Uprising and the Great Jamaican Slave Revolt of 1831–32, during Eleanora Atherton's period as a slave owner. Although suppressed, the scale of the uprising and fear of further rebellions had a major impact on public and political opinion in the United Kingdom, and resoundingly hastened the case for abolition in less than a decade.

After the abolition of slavery in the British colonies, the co-owners of the plantation were entitled to claim for the compensation, by the freeing of 544 slaves from Green Park, and a further 182 slaves from Spring Vale Estate, controlled by the same absentee owners. The owner received two separate compensation payments under the Slave Compensation Act 1837. £10,172 17s 9d for the release of enslaved at Green Park and £3,466 8s 8d for those held at Spring Vale. The compensation was split between William Harrison of London, the father of Joseph Feilden and Eleanora Atherton.

The heirs of Eleanora Atherton retained ownership of the Green Park Estate until 1910, when it was sold to Walter Woolliscroft, the estate manager. The Wall Street crash of 1929 caused the price of sugar to plummet and forced him into bankruptcy. The Green Park Estate closed in 1957.

=== Contemporary era ===
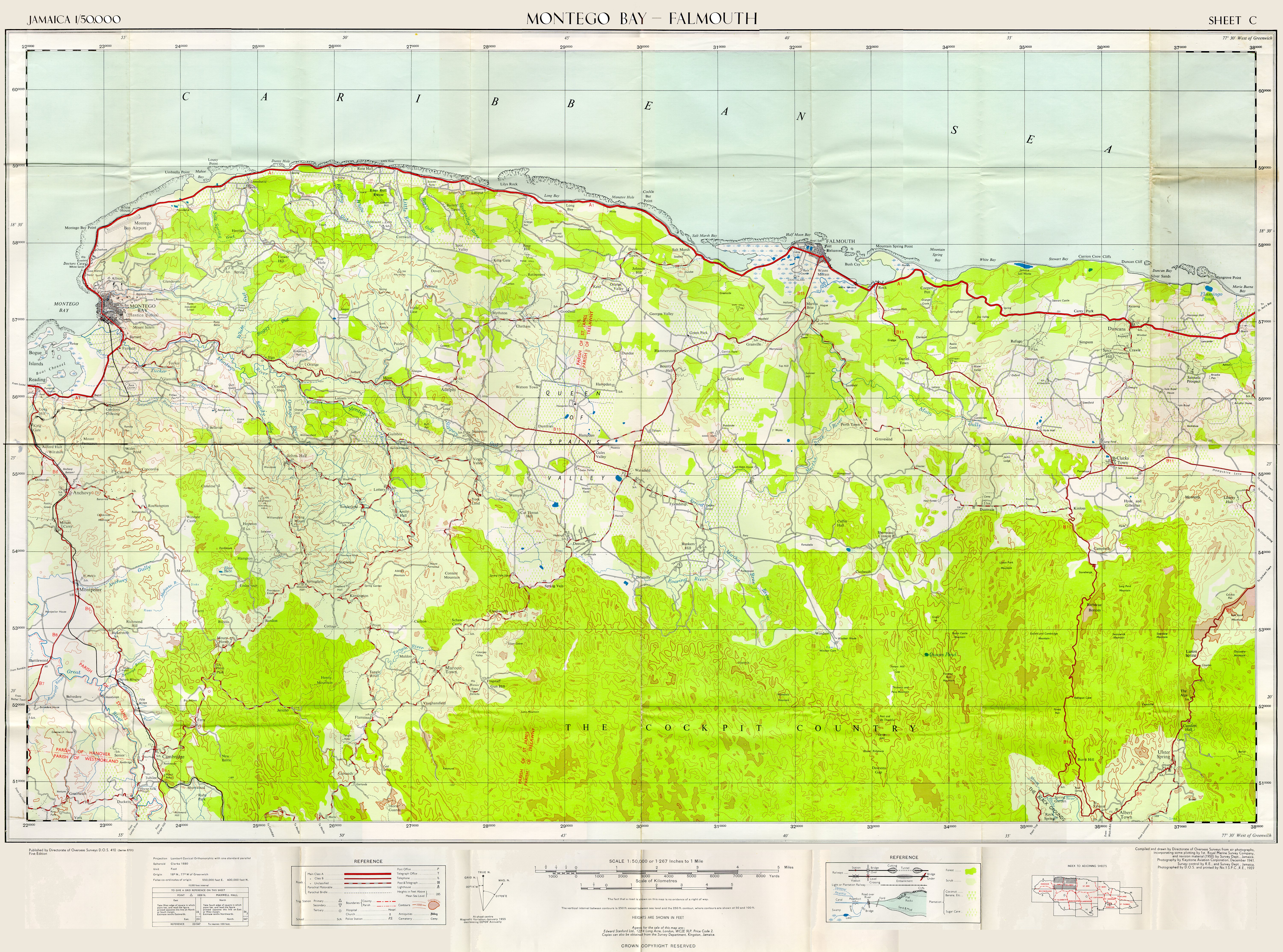
Map of the region. Green Park is SSW of Falmouth

Green Park Great House was purchased by Ray Fremmer, an American WW2 veteran, an eccentric amateur historian and archaeologist originally from Boston, who moved to Jamaica before 1960. Fremmer was the author of the 1963 book, Jamaica's heroes and patriots, and led the 1965 excavation of the heroes of the Morant Bay rebellion. In 1970, Fremmer was the victim of a home invasion which resulted in the death of one of the assailants. He was charged with murder but was later acquitted. He single-handedly attempted to restore the manor, known as the "Great House" and the stone windmill on a limited budget, with a view of making it a slave heritage museum. Fremmer was very much a recluse in his final years whilst he continued to unearth historic items; artifacts such as tools and beads, as well as human remains dating back several hundred years.

The Great House was given to the people of Jamaica after Fremmers untimely death on the property in 1990. It is now in ruins.

== See also ==
- Centre for the Study of the Legacies of British Slave-ownership
- Igbo people in the Atlantic slave trade
- Slavery in the British and French Caribbean
- Slavery at common law
- Sugar plantations in the Caribbean
