= Walton Hall, Liverpool =

Former country house in Liverpool

Coordinates: 53.4472°N 2.9493°W

Walton Hall was a 17th-century historic country house, set in a 300-acre (1.2 km^{2}) estate, which was demolished in the early 20th century. Sometimes referred to as Walton Old Hall, it was situated at the centre of the Walton Hall Park in Walton (formerly Walton-on-the-Hill), Liverpool. Its former residents were Liverpool merchants and the last two families to reside at Walton Hall profited from the Atlantic slave trade. In the 19th century it was the home of Thomas Leyland during his second and third term as Lord Mayor of Liverpool.

== History ==
It is highly likely that a stone construction had existed at the site of Walton Hall during the Anglo-Saxon period, and perhaps as far back to the Roman period. The name Walton derived from the Old English "walla" (meaning Briton) and "tun" (settlement). In terms of recorded history, the land on which Walton Old Hall was first built had numerous owners after the Norman Conquest, when lands across England were requisitioned and redistributed to Companions of William the Conqueror. The land is listed in the Domesday Book. Roger the Poitevin received the West Derby Hundred as a reward. Title of the land passed to his sheriff, Geoffrey de Valognes.

An early medieval moated ancient hall would have been demolished and partially rebuilt on several occasions. The title of the estate later passed to Gilbert (or "Waldeve") de Walton by King John in 1189. A moated lodge was built in the 14th century by this family. Following the death of Roger de Walton in the 15th century, ownership descended through a sequence of wealthy families through marriage, including the Crosse, Chorley, Fazakerley and finally the Briers or Breres in 1708, who remained at Walton Hall until it was sold to one of the earliest inhabitants of Hanover Street, John Atherton in 1746; although some historians have reported the purchase of Walton Hall to have occurred a few years earlier. Such transfers of ownership would have been relatively uncommon, since property such as Walton Hall had historically passed from one generation to another. The structure at the time would have been between 100 and 145 years old. Records show Nicholas Fazakerley acted as an agent in the purchase from Roger and Lawrence Briers. As well as a lawyer, Fazakerley was the Tory MP for Preston from 1732 to 1767. Atherton's home town.

Some of the land adjoining Walton Hall passed from Fazakerley to James Stanley, 10th Earl of Derby and the Earl of Sefton a few decades prior.

=== Atherton’s of Walton Hall ===
Three generations of Atherton's have been recorded as residents of Walton Hall.

John Atherton (the elder) (1697–1768), was a merchant and privateer, who had relocated from Preston to Hanover Street, Liverpool as an aspiring young merchant, prior to becoming a leading merchant, actively involved in numerous privateering syndicates, including investments in the Greenland fisheries as a means of diversification of his business interests by including whaling to reduce financial risk. Atherton donated land in Liverpool allowing the town to expand. This elevated his social status, and he went on to marry Frances Richmond, the granddaughter of Reverend Silvester Richmond of Walton, Lord Mayor of Liverpool (1672–73) in 1732. His name features in the lists of the Company of Merchants trading to Africa for the late eighteenth or early nineteenth century. Atherton was associated with other leading Liverpool merchants such as John Hardman, John Welch, William Bulkeley, Foster Cunliffe (1682–1758) and Felix Doran both in the Atlantic slave trade and the triangular trade. At least 18 slave voyages between 1737 and 1757 are on record. Atherton was part of a consortium of Liverpool merchants who in 1744 invested in Old Noll which they put to work as a privateer during the War of the Austrian Succession. A number of his privateering vessels were built in Norfolk, Virginia and were sized around 250 tons. Thurloe, one of his hackboats captured the Admiral of Bordeaux as a prize ship during June 1745. Atherton's connection with Nicholas Fazarkeley, and the profits from both privateering and slavery had quickly elevated his position in society, allowing him to purchase Walton Hall in 1746, and be elected to public roles in Liverpool.

John Atherton (the elder) was a trustee of Liverpool Blue Coat School in 1739. Peter Bold, became president of the Liverpool Royal Infirmary, which opened in 1743, replacing his friend, Nicholas Fazakerley, and Atherton acted as treasurer of this institution on two occasions (1752 and 1761). Atherton was the elder brother of William Atherton and had owned plantations in the Colony of Jamaica since before the mid-1760s. His daughter Catherine (1735–1819) grew up in Walton Hall and married her first cousin Dr Henry Richmond of Liverpool. Their son Legh Richmond was a clergyman, the founder of one of the first Friendly societies in England, and a supporter of Wilberforce in his attempts to stop the Atlantic Slave Trade.

His son, John Atherton (the younger) (1738–1786), attended Cambridge University. Both father and son are listed in the electoral roll of 1761 under Union Chapel. In 1766, John Atherton (the elder) kept offices in Hanover St, his former home, whilst John Atherton (the younger) had offices in Wolstenholme's St. John Atherton (the elder) died in 1768. His will dated 4 February 1768, devised other property, in addition to Walton Hall, such as Banister Hall in Walton-le-Dale, which he purchased in 1739, to his son, John Atherton (the younger) in 1768.

John Atherton (the younger) had entered St John's College, Cambridge in 1756. He married Anna Jacson of Cheshire, followed by Joanna Bird, and from 1768 was the second Atherton to own Walton Hall, having been willed the property and other homes in the Preston area.

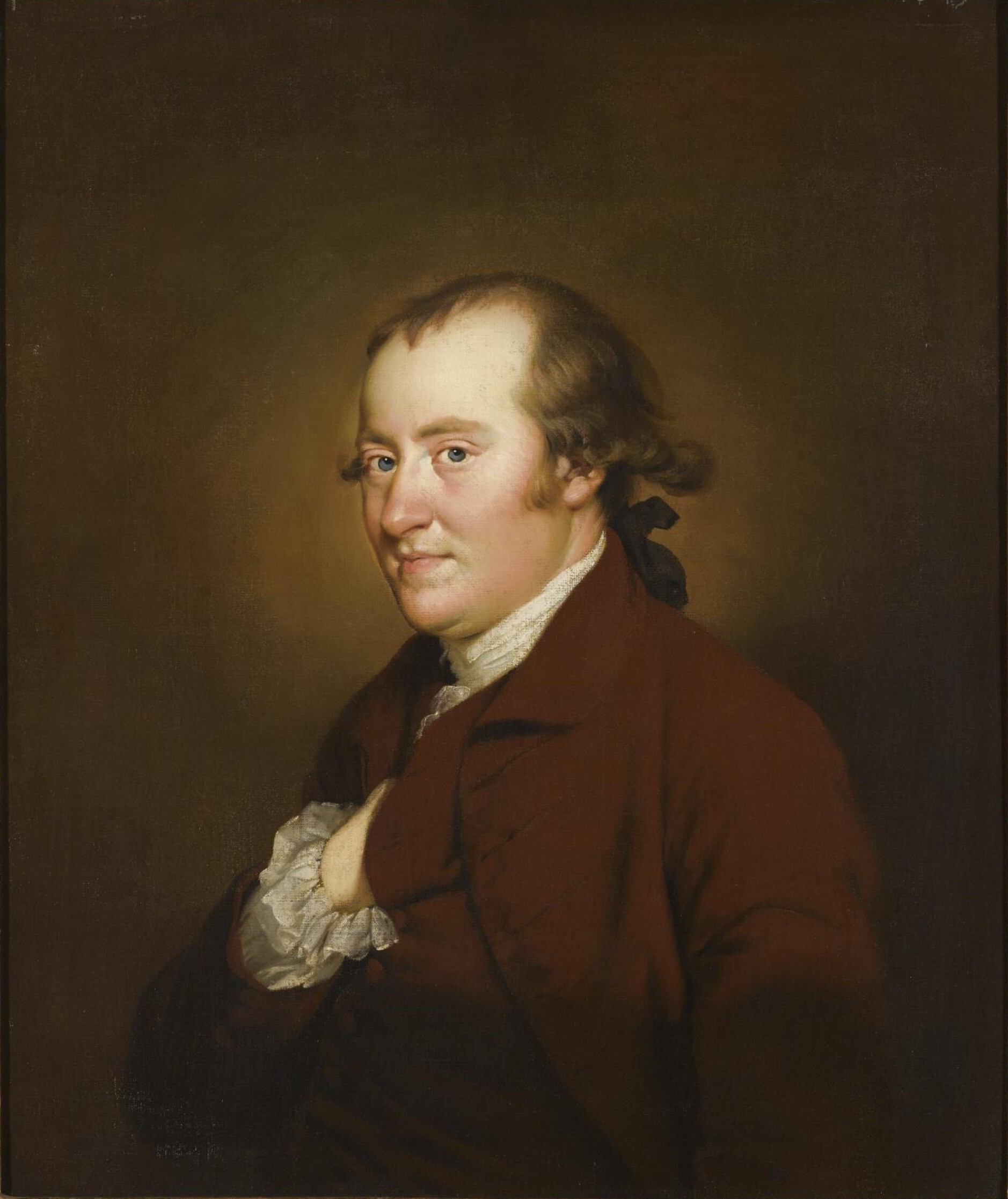
Portrait of John Atherton (the younger) by Joseph Wright of Derby 1769

It is unclear whether John Atherton (the younger) was ever directly involved in his father's slave trading, however, by association, he benefited from the profits of the Jamaican sugar plantations. Whilst his son, John Joseph Atherton (1756–1809) was studying at Trinity College, Cambridge, he became High Sheriff of Lancashire in 1780. John Atherton (the younger) remarried and subsequently died whilst in Gloucester, likely en route to, or from, business interests in Bristol in 1786. He is buried in Gloucester Cathedral and a plaque there refers to John Atherton of Walton Hall, Liverpool. His daughter Frances Margaretta (1778–1850) went on to marry a plantation owner and moved to Plymouth, North Carolina after his death.

Walton Hall passed to a twenty five year old John Joseph Atherton (1761–1809) in 1786. Having completed his studies at Cambridge, he purchased a commission as an officer in a British Army regiment of his choice. As Major in the 3rd regiment of Light Dragoons, he further elevated his social standing in 1796, by marrying into the Mitford's, an ancient noble family. The wedding to Marianne Mitford of Mitford Manor was reported in the Leeds Intelligencer reported on Monday 19 December 1796 (page 3): "On Wednesday was married, John Joseph Atherton, Esq; of Walton-Hall, in Lancashire, to Miss Mitford, daughter of Bertram Mitford, Esq; of Mitford-castle, in Northumberland". His wife who originated from Northumberland, a distant region from Liverpool, maybe struggled to accommodate herself into Liverpool society, centred around trade and commerce. With a husband serving in the Royal Household it is unlikely that much time was spent in Walton Hall. John Joseph served in the court of King George III, and for many years was the Personal aide-de-camp (A.D.C) to the monarch. He had a distinguished military career and had been taken as a prisoner of war during the French Directory, and subsequently released on parole in Valenciennes during 1796. His son, Robert Atherton was born at Walton Hall in 1801. Robert was the forth generation of Atherton's to reside at Walton Hall. Colonel John Joseph Atherton had previously purchased Street Court, a manor in Kingsland, Herefordshire. John Joseph became a member of the Herefordshire Agricultural Society In 1803, a relative, William Atherton of Green Park, Trelawny parish died childless and left him a third of his estate. When he disposed of Walton Hall and its 300-acre (1.2 km^{2}) acres, John Joseph was able to provide a rural setting for his family.

Walton Hall was sold at auction in 1804 to Liverpool businessman, Thomas Leyland. This date of sale is inconsistent with other sources that refer to 1803 and 1804. A document in the national archives refers to John Joseph Atherton being the former owner of Walton Hall in 1808.

Despite the sale of Walton Hall to Thomas Leyland, it is possible that the Atherton family reserved the right to use the title "of Walton Hall". The Naval Biographical Dictionary entry for Lt Bertram Atherton of 1824, refers to the son of Colonel Atherton of Walton Hall. It is possible that their information was simply inaccurate or the biographical entry is referring to the historical sense.

Whether Walton Hall or a nearby property in Walton remained in the ownership of the Atherton family until 1824 or thereabouts, is unknown. However the English actress and opera singer, Lucia Elizabeth Vestris refers to having visited Colonel Atherton at Walton Hall in 1819. This may be another error since he died in 1809. It is possible that John Joseph's son attained the same rank, and styled himself as Colonel Atherton of Walton Hall. The South African database 1820 settlers contains an entry to Colonel John Atherton of Walton Hall. These descendants were farmers in Cape Colony, with a future generation relocating to Anaheim, California, in the 1880s as ostrich farmers.

=== Thomas Leyland and his heirs ===
The new owner of Walton Hall from 1804 was the slave trader and banker Thomas Leyland (1752–1827). He served as Lord Mayor of the Borough of Liverpool on two more occasions; (1814–15) and (1820–21). Leyland was a Liverpool banker, businessman and lottery winner, who invested some of his winnings into the Atlantic slave trade. At least 69 slave voyages from Liverpool are in his name and are estimated to have delivered 22,365 slaves to the Americas. This estimate excludes the number of enslaved who did not survive the ocean voyage in chains, often due to overcrowding, susceptibility to disease, or by being a victim of a merciless crew, who had a free rein, and often executed the enslaved or threw their victims overboard whilst alive during times when water or food was in very short supply. This trade brought incredible riches to Leyland whilst at Walton Hall. A plantation in British Guiana was established as Walton Hall. However it is, as yet, unknown as to whether this is down to Leyland or Atherton, or a business partner, or perhaps Walton Hall, West Yorkshire. With the passing of the Slave Trade Act 1807, Leyland continued to reside at Walton Hall, he entered into a partnership with Richard Bullin, a Staffordshire Ware merchant, who married Leyland's sister Margaret and established the Leyland & Bullins Bank. His widow continued to reside at Walton Hall, right up until her death in 1839. Leyland's two nephews, Richard and Christopher Bullin were his primary business partners and they became his beneficiaries, inheriting the Walton estate, on the condition they both assumed the Leyland name and coat of arms, as per instructions in Leyland's Will. Both nephews died childless and ownership of Walton Hall passed to their younger sister, Dorothy and her husband John Wrench Naylor (1813–1889). The condition of Walton Hall had seen better days and it soon fell into complete disrepair after their deaths. Walton Hall would remain within the family for one more generation whilst continuing to rapidly deteriorate. It is unlikely to have been inhabited by its owners during the first part of the 20th century.

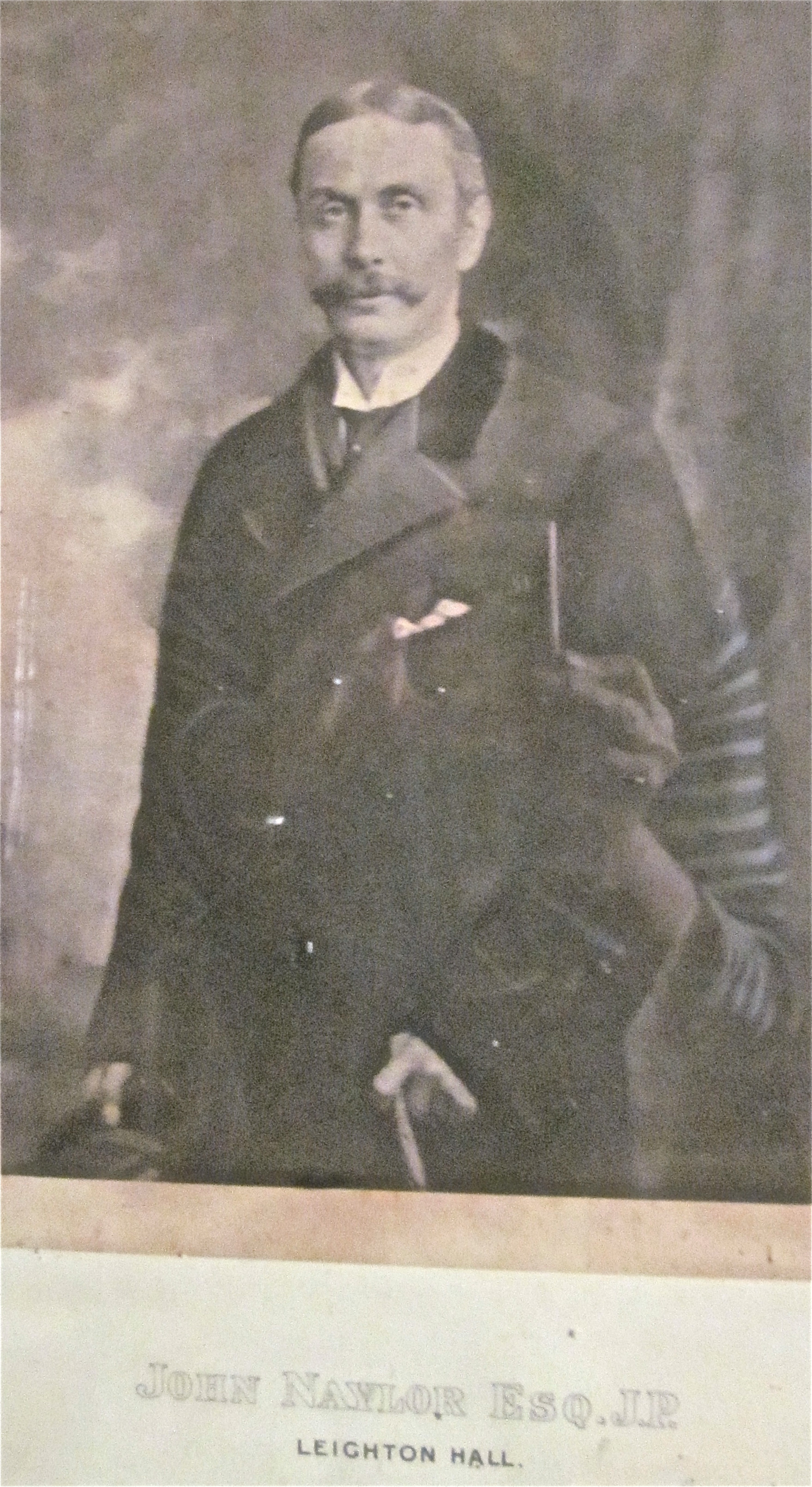
Print of John Naylor JP of Leighton Hall c.1870.

The estate was inherited by his son Christopher John Naylor (1849–1926), who changed his name to Leyland in 1893. Walton became part of Liverpool Corporation in 1895. The city at the time was rapidly expanding, incorporating former villages which became urban areas in a couple of generations. It ceased to have any of its former rural appeal, and the area no longer suited the landed gentry, in the same manner as Halsnead Hall in Whiston, Merseyside. The Liverpool Corporation purchased Walton Hall and by 1907 had demolished the ancient hall.

== Description ==
From historical illustrations and pictures from the Victorian era, the facade of the property dated from the Jacobean era. The grand entrance to this former estate had large wrought iron gates set back from Haggerston Road. The estate had a half a mile long driveway leading down to the former 17th century hall, and was flanked by Rhododendron. When Walton Hall was put up for auction in 1802, it was described as "A residence admirably suited to a commercial gentleman of the first importance." Some sources refer to the auction taking place in 1804. One hundred years later it was demolished, no longer having any purpose. This was despite remnants of the earlier structure dating back to the 14th century being found during the dismantling process.

== Location ==
=== Walton Hall Park ===
The origins of the park and former location of Walton Old Hall dates back to Henry de Walton, steward of the West Derby Hundred in 1199.

The Liverpool Corporation purchased Walton Hall, together with the surrounding 300-acre (1.2 km^{2}) estate in the early 20th century and demolished the ancient hall. A triangular plot was identified to be designated as a 130-acre (0.53 km^{2}) public space which was named Walton Hall Park. 60% of the original estate was allocated for residential development. A design for a Walton Hall Park by H. Chalton Bradshaw was agreed, however works were delayed due to the onset of World War I, when the land was requisitioned to be used as a munitions depot. Ownership was restored in 1924 and it was developed into Walton Hall Park. The park was official opened to the public on 18 July 1934 by George V, in a ceremony to coincide with its his visit to Liverpool and the opening of the Queensway tunnel.

=== Walton Hall Avenue ===
The name of Walton Hall Avenue has been questioned a number of times since Walton Hall was once the primary residence of John Atherton and Thomas Leyland, who both benefited from the Atlantic slave trade. However the avenue is named after the "de Walton" family, who owned the lands during the later part of the Middle Ages, for over 350 years, with a total of 650 years of continuous family ownership; if including the maternal lineage from "de Walton", onto their descendants, the Crosse family and onto Chorley, Fazakerley and Briers/Breres, who sold it in 1746.

== See also ==
- History of Liverpool
- Centre for the Study of the Legacies of British Slave-ownership
- Slavery in Britain
- International Slavery Museum
