= Robert Atherton (civil servant) =

British colonial official

Robert Atherton CCS, JP (1801 – 1855) was a 19th-century British colonial official in British Ceylon (present-day Sri Lanka), where he served for more than 25 years. After a distinguished career in the Royal Navy, during which he was awarded the Burma Medal, he held a series of administrative and judicial posts in the Northern Province of Ceylon from 1825 to 1835. He was appointed Assistant Government Agent (A.G.A.) of the Eastern Province in 1835, 1839, and 1845, and of the Northern Province in 1836. He also served as District Judge of Batticaloa in 1841 and as Justice of the Peace (JP) for the Eastern Province from 1848 until his death in 1855. In addition to his official career, Atherton was also an author, best known for his 1835 legal publication Thasawalamy: Or, The Laws and Customs of the Malabars of Jaffna.

== Early life ==
Robert Atherton was born on 8 December 1801 at Walton on the Hill, Liverpool, the fourth son of Colonel John Joseph Atherton (1761–1809) of the Second Lancashire Regiment of Fencible Light Dragoons. His father was associated with Walton Hall, Liverpool, and Street Court, Kingsland, Herefordshire.

His mother was Marianne Mitford (1777-1856), the eldest daughter of Bertram Mitford (1748-1800) of Mitford Old Manor House.

Atherton was christened in Walton on the Hill, Liverpool a year after his birth on 17 December 1802. His ancient paternal family home, Walton Hall, Liverpool was sold two years later after multiple generations of occupancy. Street Court, a manor in Kingsland, Herefordshire became his new home in a rural setting. Shortly before his eighth birthday, his military father died.

Aspects of Atherton’s schooling and early life in England prior to his naval service remain obscure. Following the death of his father in 1809, he grew up with his widowed mother at Street Court, Herefordshire. A contemporary critic later noted he "was brought up to the profession of a seaman", suggesting his education was oriented toward naval rather than academic life.

His youngest brother, George Nugent Atherton, drowned on 15 February 1827 after the ice broke beneath him whilst he was skating on the Round Pond in Kensington Gardens, London.

When coming of age, Atherton did not purchase his commission as an officer in his father's regiment, instead he joined the Royal Navy, in the footsteps of his elder brother, Bertram Mitford Atherton (1800-1858).

== Naval career ==
Atherton served for two years under Captain Frederick Marryat on board the HMS Larne (1814), a 20-gun sixth rate small warship in the First Anglo-Burmese War (1824–1825). As the acting purser onboard, he was the officer responsible for all administrative duties, including managing ship’s supplies, such as food and drink, clothing, bedding and candles. Pursers at the time received no fixed salary but were entitled to profits generated through their business activities.

=== March to December 1824 ===
During March, Governor-General Amherst had declared war on Burma. The Royal Navy captured Rangoon (present day Yangon) and with 4,000 men defended it against General Maha Bandula’s army of 60,000. A recipient of the Burma Medal, Atherton was honourably mentioned for bravery in Captain Frederick Marryat's despatches at the time.

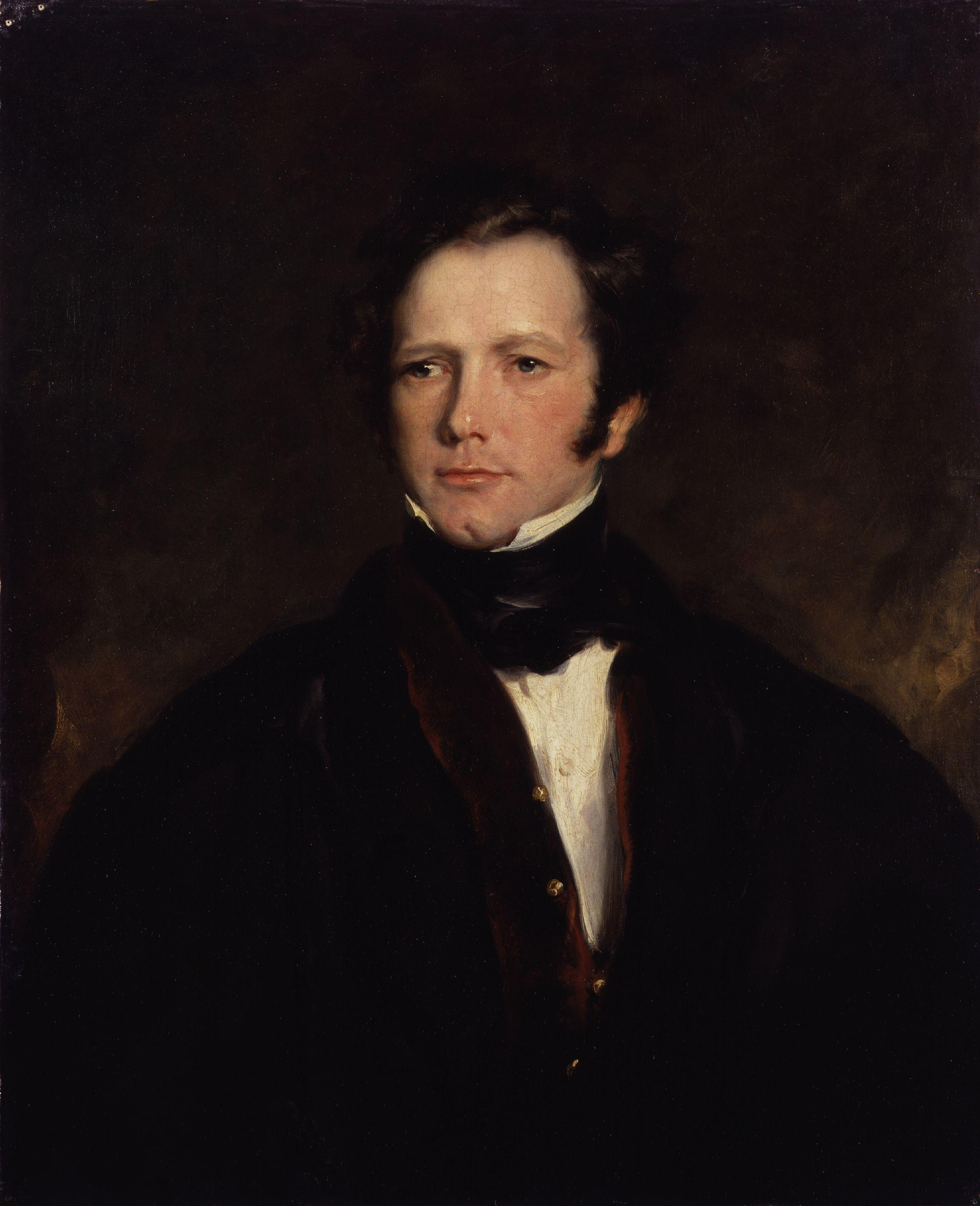
Frederick Marryat by John Simpson

On the 2 April 1824, the British expedition under the command of Sir Archibald Campbell, proceeded against Rangoon, home of the Konbaung dynasty, with HMS Larne, the fleet of transports (for land forces), and East India Company cruisers assembling at Port Cornwallis, in the Andaman Islands.

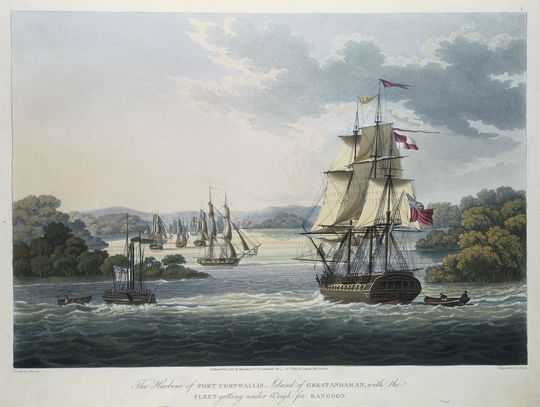
The Harbour of Port Cornwallis, Island of Great Andaman with the Fleet getting under way for Rangoon, 1824

On 11 May 1824, HMS Larne proceeded up the Irrawaddy River and having silenced an artillery battery, landed the troops who occupied Rangoon before proceeding further up river, with many of the crew falling ill with cholera and other diseases.

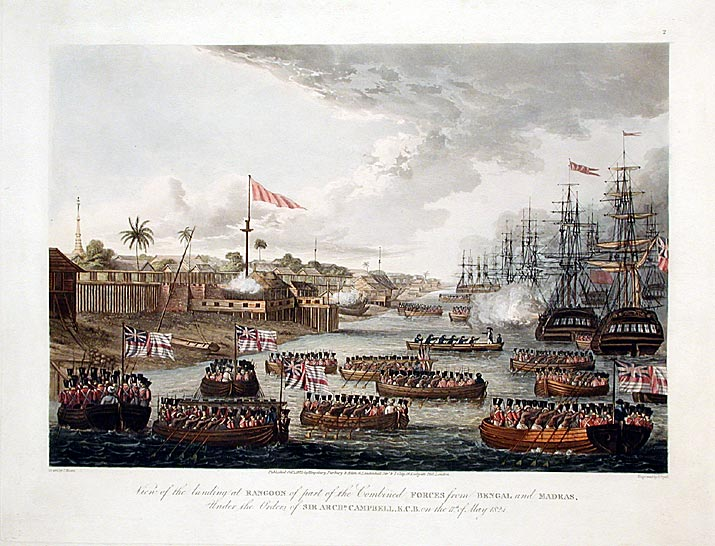
British forces launch an amphibious assault on Rangoon in May 1824

On the 11 July 1824, Captain Frederick Marryat reported to Commodore Charles Grant as follows:

"I must now call your attention to the condition of HMS Larne, whose crew I am sorry to say have been rendered quite inefficient by disease. Since we have been on this expedition, we have had 170 cases of cholera and dysentery. We have had thirteen deaths – we have now thirty patients at the hospital on shore, and twenty in the sick list on board; our convalescents are as ineffective as if they were in their hammocks; they relapse daily, and the surgeon reports, that, unless the vessel can be sent to cruise for a month, there is little chance of their ultimate recovery. When I sent away the expedition, under Lieutenants Thomas Fraser, on the 7th instant, I could only muster three officers and twelve men fit for duty. The conduct of Lieutenant Fraser, on the several expeditions which he has commanded, has been that of a gallant and steady officer; and I am under the greatest obligations to Mr. Atherton, not only for his active services in the boats, but for carrying on the whole duty of the ship, during the absence and sickness of the other officers. The behaviour of Mr. John Duffill, master’s-mate of this ship, and of Messrs. Winsor and Maw, midshipmen, lent from the Sophie and Liffey, has been very satisfactory, and I trust, that when future opportunities may occur, they will so distinguish themselves as to have a fair claim for promotion."

Commodore Charles Grant fell mortally ill and departed for the Straits Settlements (then controlled by the East India Company), and died on 25 July 1824. In an official letter, addressed to Commodore Grant, of whose death he was then uninformed, Captain Frederick Marryat says:

"The gallantry of the officers employed in this expedition, viz. Lieutenant Fraser, Mr. Atherton, and Messrs. Duffill, Winsor, and [J. H.] Norcock, deserves the highest encomiums. I am sorry that our list of killed and wounded is so heavy."

=== January to December 1825 ===
At the beginning of January, under the command of Sir Archibald Campbell, and Captain Henry Ducie Chads, Atherton was involved with the preparations for the advance on Ava (present day Inwa), located in Mandalay Region, Burma, involving the joint crews of the HMS Arachne, HMS Larne, and HMS Sophie, which included a detachment of 237 men. On 11 January 1825, the troops, under Lieutenant-Colonel Richard Goodall Elrington (1776—1845), of the 47th (Lancashire) Regiment of Foot, embarked on board two divisions of gunboats, commanded by Captain G. T. Finnucane, of the 14th regiment, and Lieutenant Joseph H. Rouband, of the Bombay Marine, with the objective of driving the enemy from the old Portuguese fort and the pagoda of Syriam (present day Thanlyin).

The detachment including Atherton landed under the fort of Syriam, and found the bridge across the nullah removed: to make another, with planks sent for the occasion, provided the Royal Navy an opportunity of displaying their usual activity, skill, and steady courage. On this point the enemy kept up a heavy and well-directed fire, by which nearly 30 men were killed and wounded, including among the latter Atherton, and five sailors. In a few minutes, however, the bridge was laid, by the blue jackets swimming across with the planks; two of the gun-boats were also brought up the creek. On the soldiers gaining the opposite bank, and rushing upon the works, the enemy instantly fled, although the place was as strong as considerable art and indefatigable labour could render it, and was capable of making a most formidable resistance.

During the attack of the Syriam pagoda the next morning, "the sailors assisted in manning the scaling ladders, and Lieutenant Keele was the first person over" the stockade at the foot of the edifice: here ended the military operations, for the enemy made no further resistance, and parties were immediately formed to bum and destroy the works. Lieutenant Keele reported in the highest terms the steady bravery and good conduct of Lieutenants Thomas Fraser and Bazely; Messrs. Lett, Coyde, Michell, Cranley, and Scott, midshipmen; Atherton, and of every man attached to the flotilla. “One occurrence we feel it but justice to name, as shewing a truly British spirit. A soldier, in crossing the bridge, fell overboard and would have been drowned, but for the gallantry and humanity of Mr. Scott, who instantly jumped after him, under the enemy’s heavy fire, and was himself exhausted when brought on shore.”

On the 26 March, Atherton’s ship, HMS Larne weighed and dropped down to Naputtah, which had accepted British protection. On the 27 March, Captain Frederick Marryat received information, that the guns belonging to the deserted stockades were at the town of Thingang, situated up a branch of the river leading to Rangoon; that 150 Naputtah men were detained there, to be forwarded to Danubyu; and that the enemy’s force consisted of 800 men.

On the morning of the 28 March, Captain Frederick Marryat proceeded against Thingang, at the head of fifty seamen and marines, twelve sepoys, and fifty villagers whom he had prevailed upon to fight against the Burmese, and armed with swords and spears. At 3 p.m., while forming for the attack, a canoe came off, with intelligence that the enemy did not wish to fight, and would submit to his terms: these were, that all arms should be surrendered, the Naputtah men to be provided with canoes to return to their homes, and the Wongee of the town placed at his disposal. This personage being one of General Maha Bandula’s principal chiefs, who had commanded 1,000 men at the attack of Rangoon, and been invested with the gold chattah chief was brought away as a prisoner. On the night of the 30 March, the same force was sent, under Lieutenant Fraser, to surprise the village of Pumkayi, where the enemy were stated to be 300 strong, and commanded by another gold chattah chief. The attack was successful; the Burmese submitted to the same terms as at Thingang; and the Wongee, who had fled into the jungle, was followed and taken by the Naputtah men, who, in consequence of their former good conduct, were now entrusted with muskets. A party of 100 men, the only force that remained between Cape Negrais and Bassein, subsequently sent in their submission. Previous to their separation, Captain Frederick Marryat received Major Robert Sale’s "sincere thanks for his valuable and cordial cooperation". The conduct of Lieutenant Fraser, Mr. Atherton, and Messrs. Dewes and Norcock, midshipmen, was reported to Captain Thomas Alexander in terms of high commendation.

On 3 June 1825, Atherton was slightly wounded during a successful attack on the stockades near the village of Kemmindine. This expedition resulted in the loss of the quartermaster, Peter Knox. Atherton is mentioned the despatches of Captain Coe, who transmitted a report of the attack from the recently promoted Captain George Frederick Ryves of HMS Sophie.

During December 1825, Atherton was honourably mentioned in both the despatches of Captain Thomas Alexander and Captain Henry Ducie Chads, who both served as commanders of HMS Alligator. Atherton was recognised for his valiant efforts in the 11–12 January naval expedition in cooperation with land forces under the command of Sir Archibald Campbell. Having been wounded twice during the 2 year campaign, and often sick, Atherton was discharged from further service, joining the Ceylon Civil Service. Mr Jones, the clerk on HMS Boadicea was appointed purser on HMS Larne, vice Atherton in December 1825.

== Ceylon Civil Service ==
=== 1825-1835 ===
As a commissioned officer in the Ceylon Civil Service (C.C.S), he initially performed the duties of District officer, replacing E. Nolan, who retired. Atherton’s first C.C.S civil appointment was to be based at the north of the Island, as Superintendent of Stud, Sitting Magistrate, and Fiscal of Delft from 5 December 1825.

While holding the appointment of Superintendent of Delft Island, he married at Kayts, on 24 April 1826. During these early years on the island Atherton served in the Ceylon Rifles.

During 1828 Atherton was commissioner of Jaffnapatam. He went on to serve as the Assistant Collector of Customs, Jaffna from 1 January 1831. These roles ceased in 1833.

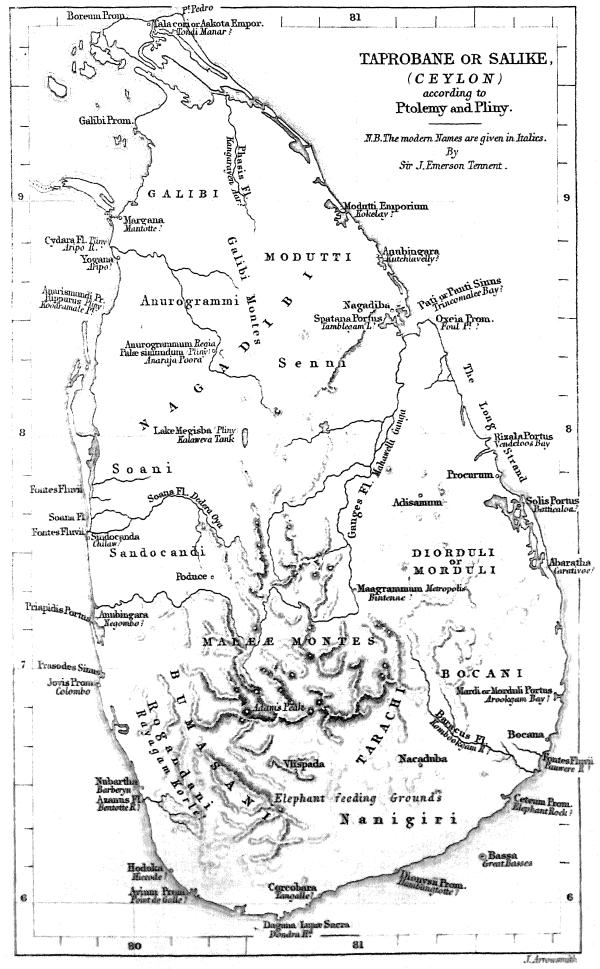
A map of Ceylon (Sri Lanka)

In 1833 the Colebrooke-Cameron Commission created the Legislative Council of Ceylon, the first step towards a representative government on the island. Initially it consisted of 16 members: the British Governor, the five appointed members of the Executive Council of Ceylon (the Colonial Secretary, the Attorney General, the Auditor-General, the Treasurer and the General Officer Commanding), four other government officials (including the Government Agents of the Western and Central provinces) and six appointed unofficial members (three Europeans, one Sinhalese, one Tamil and one Burgher). Atherton was one of the first Acting Government Agents (A.G.A.) to be appointed by the Governor.

=== 1835-1845 ===
Although Atherton was initially based in the Northern Province, from 1835 he performed the role of A.G.A. in the Eastern Province, relocating with his family to Batticaloa.

Atherton returned to the Northern Province the following year, before making Batticaloa his primary residence. He became the A.G.A Eastern Province from 1 November 1835, and the A.G.A for the Northern Province from 1 March 1836.

In February 1839, Atherton was appointed once again as the A.G.A Eastern Province.

On 12 March 1839, the Wesleyan missionary and educator, Peter Percival gave positive account of various speeches at the Wesleyan Methodist Mission, North Ceylon in Jaffna, including one delivered by Atherton, following the successful visit of James Alexander Stewart-Mackenzie, the seventh Governor of Ceylon to Jaffna, which included a tour of the Wesleyan school on 4 March 1839.

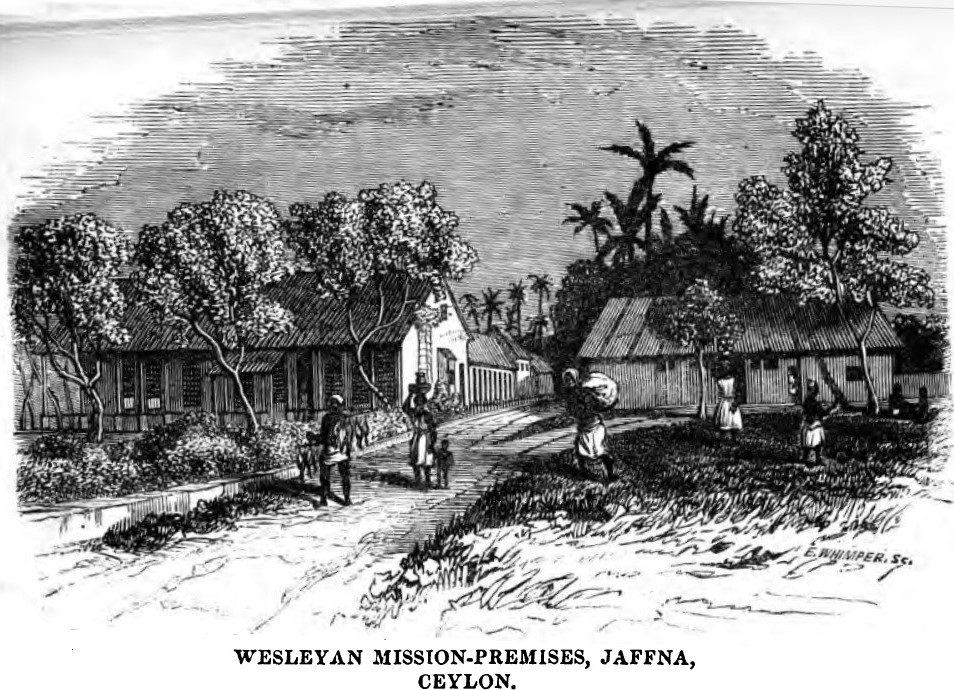
Wesleyan Mission, Jaffna, Ceylon

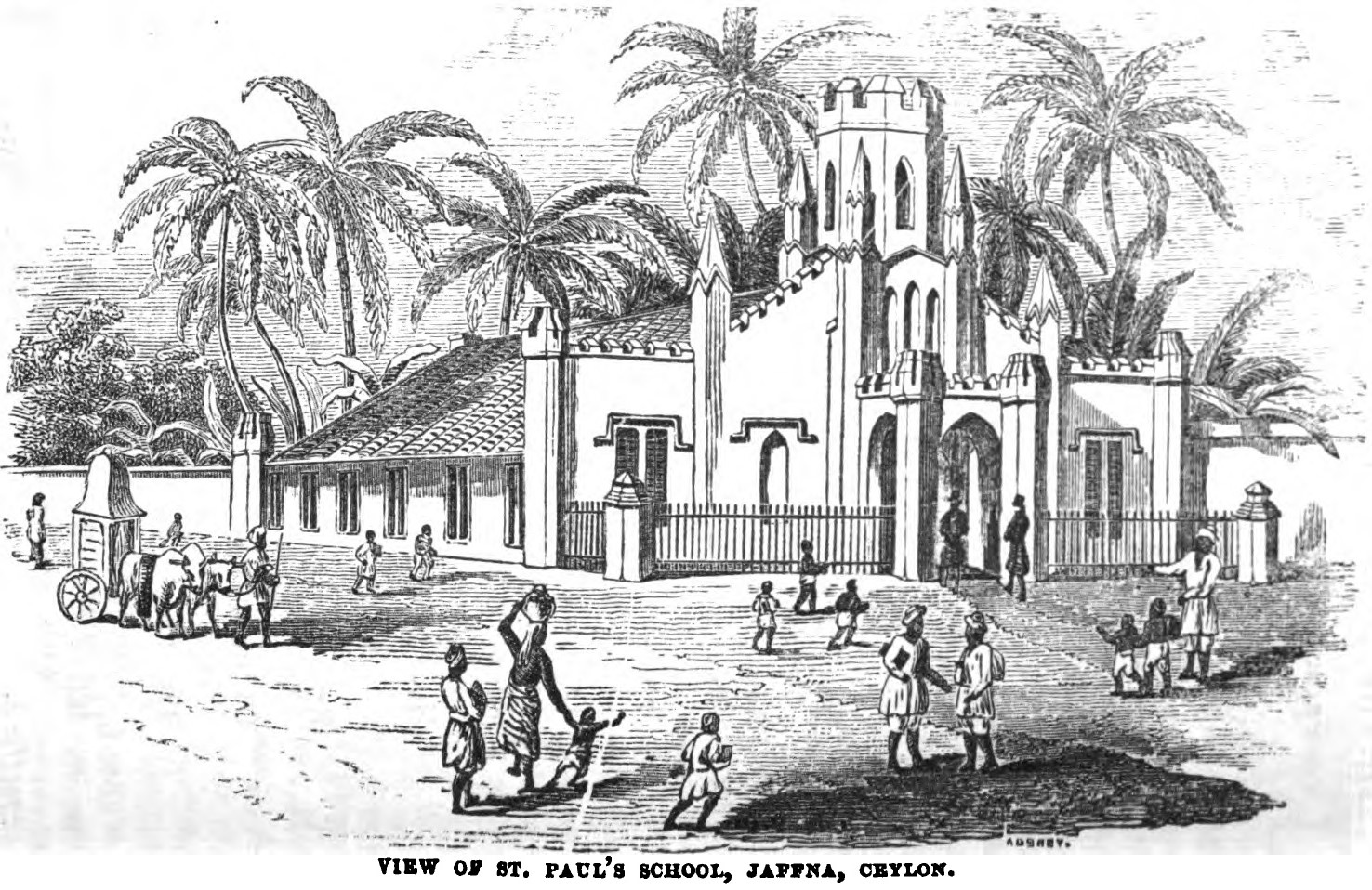
View of St. Paul's School, Jaffna, Ceylon

He was appointed as Acting District Judge, Batticaloa in November 1839 and again in 1841, and becoming A.G.A at Batticaloa from 16 September 1845.

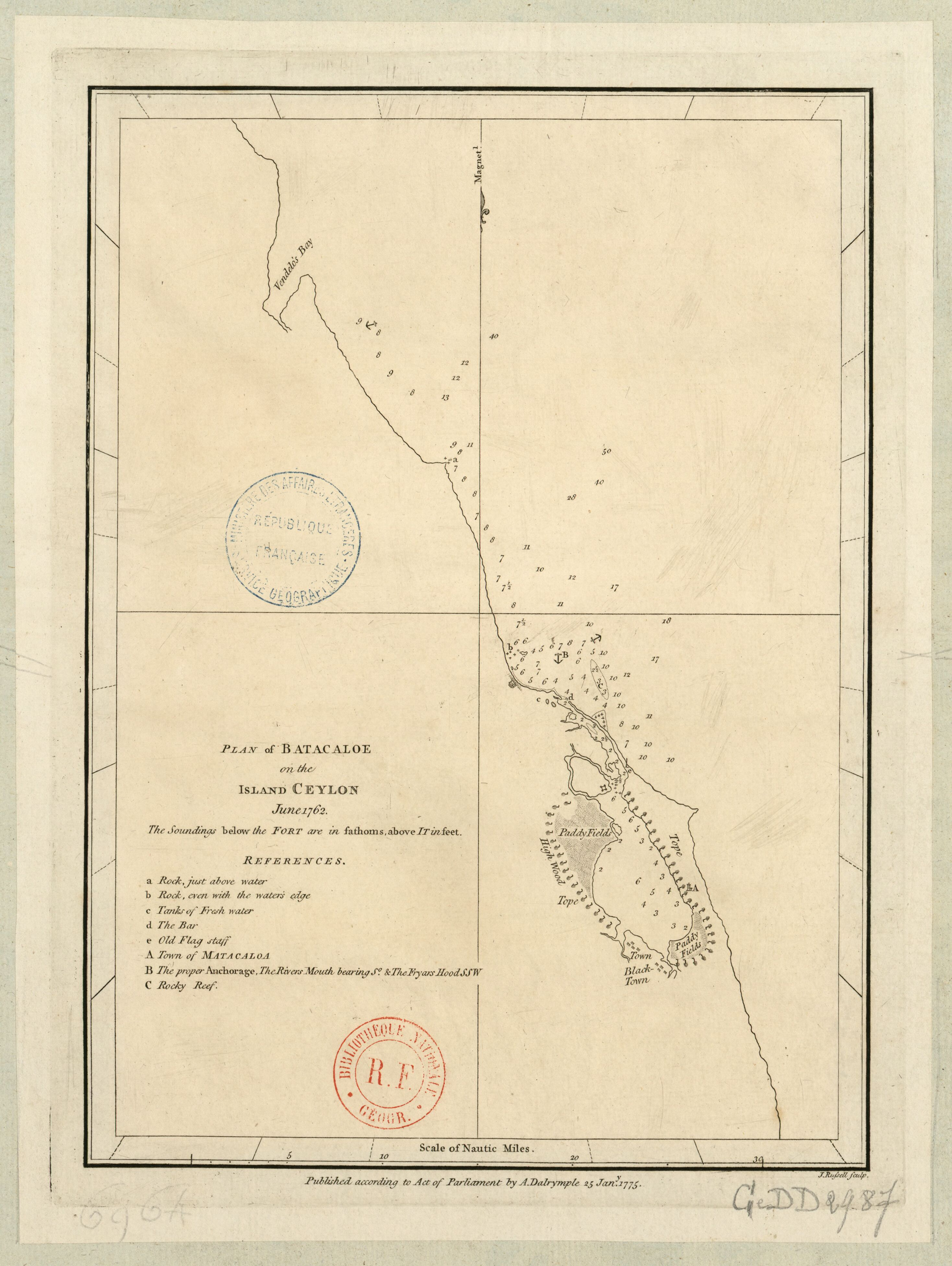
Plan of Batticaloa, June 1762 / publ. by Alexander Dalrymple (1737-1808)

During 1841, the Colombo Observer published a letter to the editor where an unnamed individual vented their frustration towards the Mackenzie administration, criticising Atherton's legal credentials, by stating:

"We are credibly informed that a gentleman was raised to Judgeship of the District Court of Ceylon with a salary of £1,000 per annum, who was brought up to the profession of a seaman, and who was destitute of the commonest requisites for his legal office".

Nevertheless, for 29 years, he dutifully served in the British Colonial administration on the island in a variety of roles. Atherton has been attributed by his contemporaries for his efforts, with great goodwill, for distributing funding from the colonial treasury over numerous years to assist the Vedda with a means of cultivating the soil. He worked closely with Reverend Ralph Stott of the Wesleyan Mission of Batticaloa to direct the good work towards the Vedda Mission. Stott was fluent in Tamil and the son of Ralph Stott (1839-1877), the inventor. Atherton was of the belief that Christianity would serve as a means of civilisation, so he took missionaries with him into the jungle, where many of the Vedda lived in poor conditions. For Atherton and his wife, Eleanor, Reverend Ralph Stott had nothing but the highest praise.

Atherton was a religious man. He and his wife joined the Wesleyan Congregation in Batticaloa during 1841. This coincided with the erection of the first monument to commemorate the landing of the first Methodist missionary, Reverend William Ault in 1814. Contemporarily known as Batticaloa Gate, the design has a distinct resemblance to the Gateway of India in Mumbai.

Atherton’s position at the head of local government was advantageous to the Wesleyan’s. He became a very enthusiastic lay worker and was described as zealous and highly enthusiastic in this role. His faith became intertwined with his role as the leading colonial government official in the region where he promoted social advancement of the Coast Veddas and an isolated group known as the Bintenne Veddas who had been marginalised by other ethnic groups. Atherton introduced both groups to new farming methods, in tandem with his missionary work.

In November 1842, Atherton wrote to the English Wesleyan Mission informing them that the Vedda mission had made substantial progress:

"Everything is going on there quietly — they are busy cultivating grains, and I have sent them a good supply of coconut palms."

At the time of writing this letter, Atherton was making preparations to establish a third Vedda village with its own school, and to settle another 40 to 60 families over the course of 1843.

During 1844, the Morning Star or “Uthayatharakai”, the first Tamil newspaper on the island and second Tamil newspaper in the world, published a letter to the editor from Aliquis on the state of Christianity in Batticaloa and the progress made by the church, with Robert Atherton Esq. of the Ceylon Civil Service occupying the chair, and addressing the numerous auditory convened.

=== 1845-1855 ===
Atherton was the first to recognise that the abolishment of the practice of Rājākariya by the British administration had an adverse effect on paddy fields. Although the colonial government had good intentions, cultivation and production dramatically decreased due to improper maintenance of the ancient irrigation system. It would take until the 1860s (a few years after Atherton's untimely death) to rectify and restore the region to its previous position as "granary of the east".

Atherton was A.G.A. for the Eastern Province during the cyclone of 1845, which hit Batticaloa and its environs. Coconut plantations and many acres were destroyed, however his home "Burleigh House" would survive for another 120 years, until it was severely damaged a century later by the cyclone of 1978.

Atherton (as A.G.A.), had ultimate control and oversight of regional infrastructure works. An example being the provision of fresh water supply, and the ability to replenish the river supply during seasons of drought by closing the mouth of the Veeready Aar, so it flooded the land of Ackerepattu and numerous fields along the Sangapadda Aar, to raise the munmarie field crops. Inspection of the cutcherry records (the local court of justice public offices), supplemented by sight of Atherton’s diary by H.G. Ward in 1857, revealed that in 1849 the repair required a total of 200 men for 2 weeks to restore functionality of the dam upstream from Batticaloa.

Atherton was widely respected in his work for the colonial administration. The 5th Colonial Secretary, Sir James Emerson Tennent stated in his work published in 1859 that Atherton, as the A.G.A., in conjunction with Wesleyan Methodist Missionaries, had attempted to enhance the living conditions of the Veddas. During 1838 "cottages were built for them in their own district, rice land assigned to them, wells dug, coconuts planted, two communities were speedily settled in Vippam-madoo." A school was founded and two other settlements formed in Oomany and Villengelavelly. However the enterprise was soon abandoned owing to the misconduct of some of the teachers. “But” continues Tennent, "the good effects of even this temporary experiment were apparent; not one of the Veddas returned to his cave and savage habits".

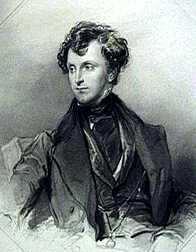
James Emerson Tennent

When he visited Atherton in Batticaloa during 1848, Tennent saw on the esplanade, in front of Government House, the remains of what had formerly been a Dutch garden, with a reservoir in the centre, abounding with tortoises.

Atherton is also mentioned in the Memorials of James Chapman, the first bishop of Colombo.

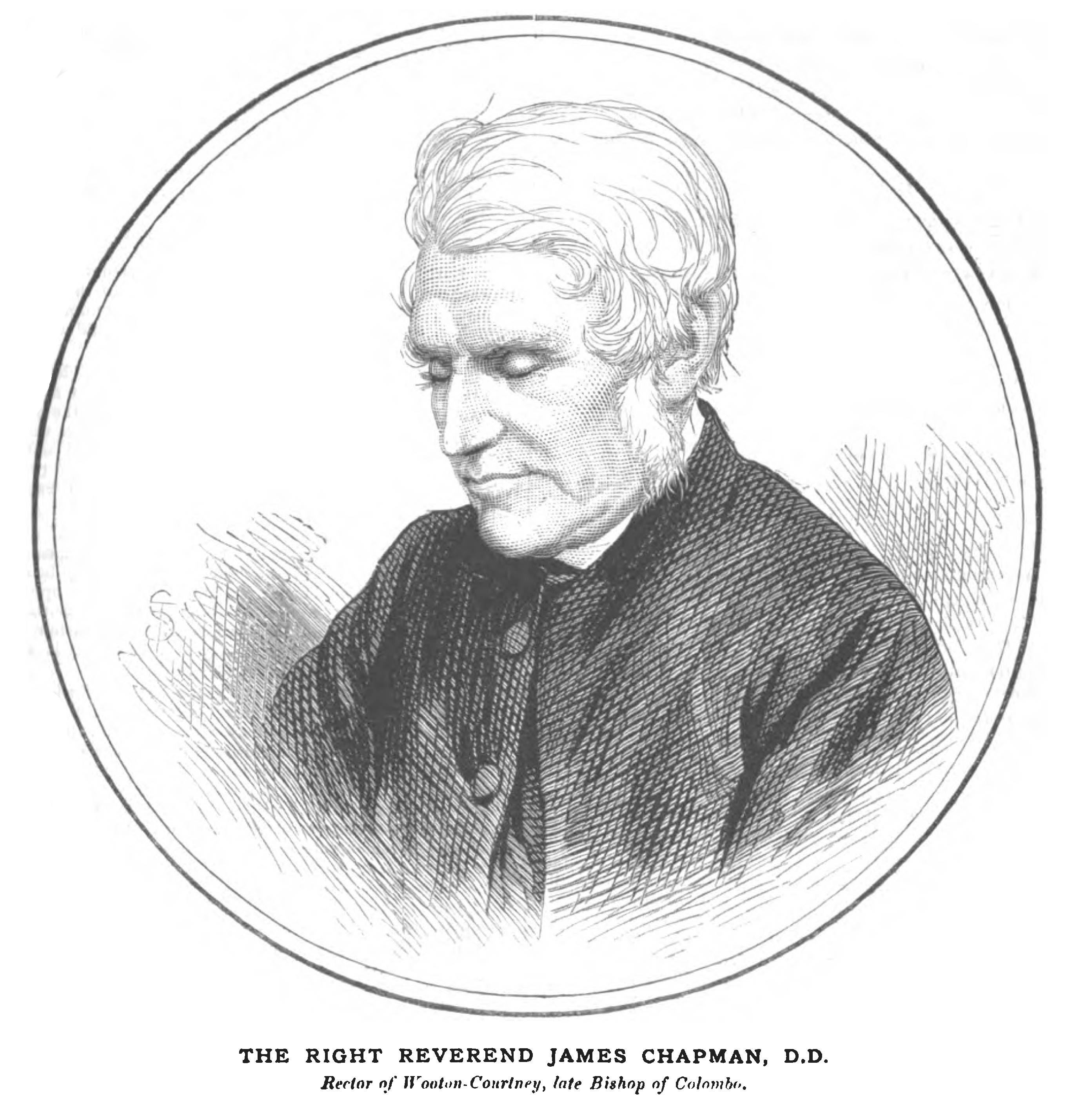

For a number of decades the Eastern Province of Ceylon was considered far too remote, with limited access and communication. However, Reverend Chapman travelled from the capital; Colombo to Batticaloa, via Badulla on horseback in February 1850. Upon arriving on the outskirts of Batticaloa, Atherton as the A.G.A. hosting his visit, rowed Chapman, and his party of two catechists along the lagoon in his canoe the last three miles to his A.G.A‘s residence.

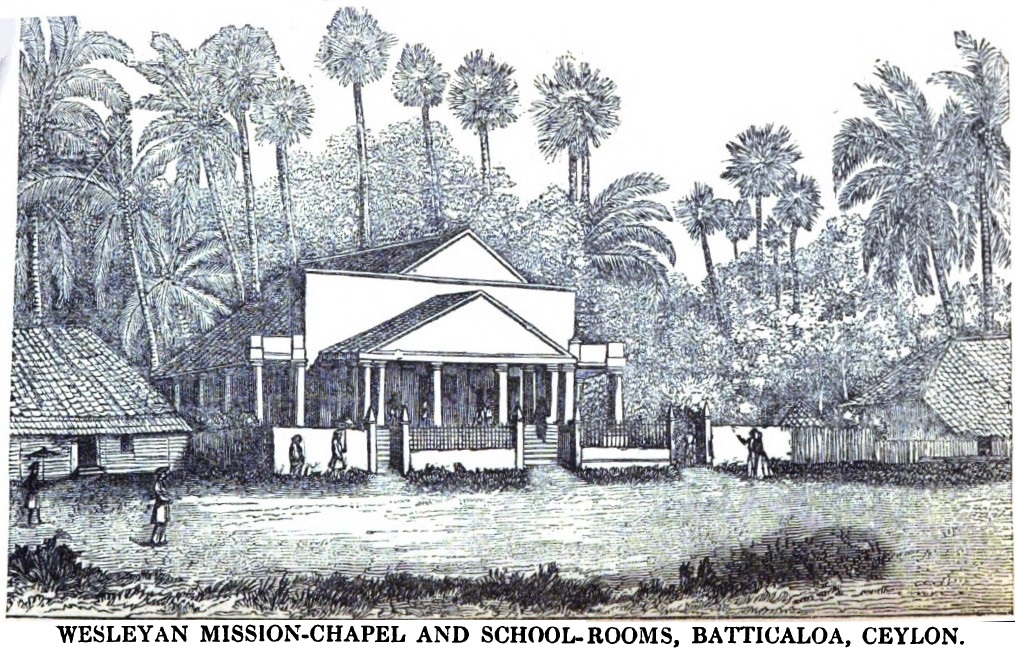
Wesleyan Mission-Chapel and School-Rooms, Batticaloa, Ceylon (1850)

By 1850, the Wesleyan community of Batticaloa became hugely divided, resulting in the loss of Atherton to the Anglican Communion. This was a particularly grievous blow to the Wesleyans, for much of their success in the Eastern Province was due to Atherton’s exertions on their behalf. With all the fervour of the recently converted, Atherton now worked for the Anglicans, and against the Wesleyans. The loss of Atherton was a big impact to the Wesleyan community in Batticaloa. An initial reduction in grants brought them under a huge financial strain, followed by the loss of government patronage.

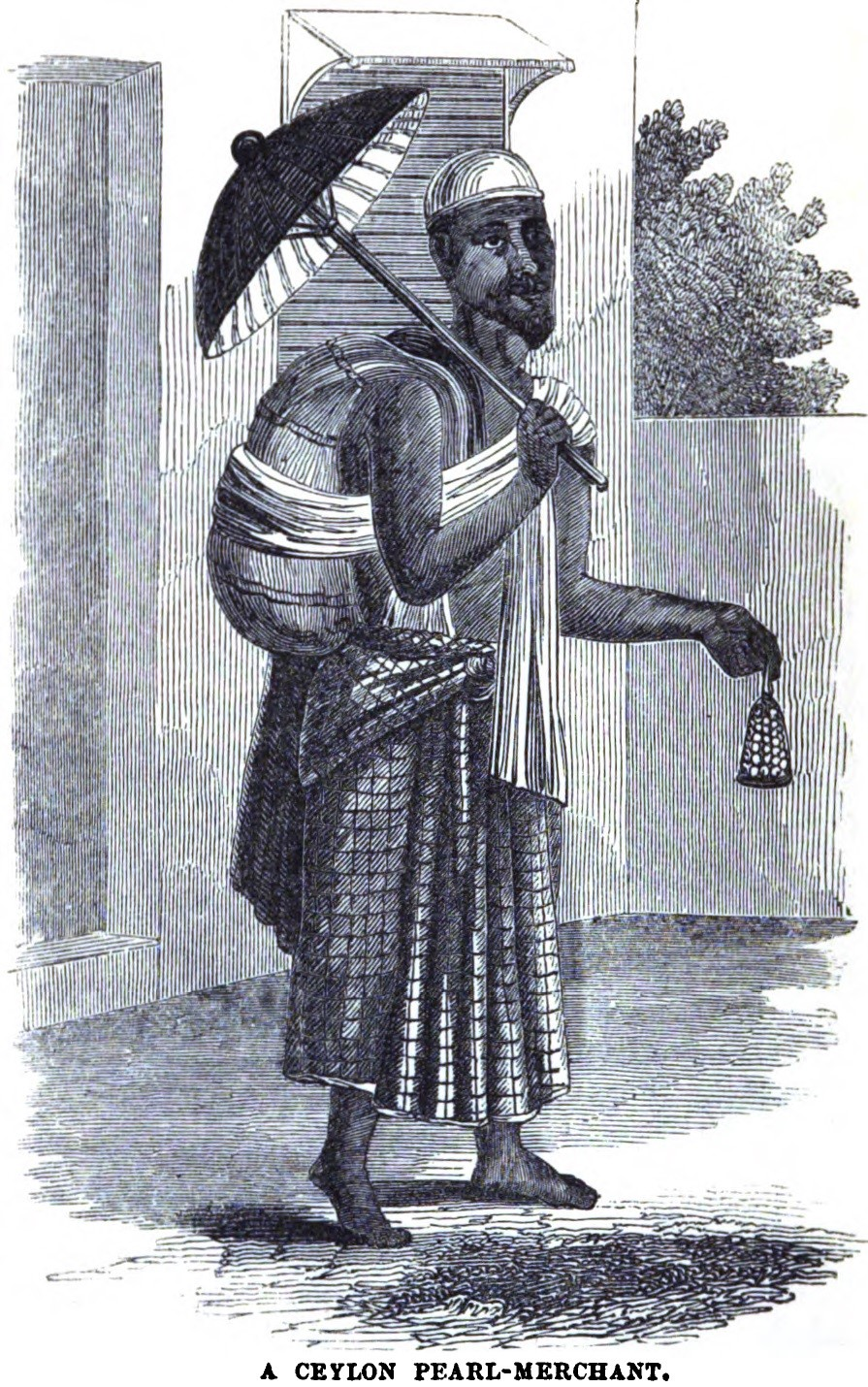
A Ceylon Pearl Merchant (p.108, 1849)

The Ceylon Almanac of 1851 records Atherton as the A.G.A. of the Eastern Province based in Batticaloa, whilst the Ceylon Almanac of 1855 records Atherton under the Customs Department as acting collector of the Eastern Province based in Trincomalee. The Ceylon Savings Bank records him on page 136 as a member of this institutions branch committee, along with the capacity to receive and remit deposits.

Both his sons, Robert and Edward followed him into the Ceylon Civil Service. His daughter, Marianne also married a civil servant. The Colonial Administration’s appointment of his 19 year old son as a judge in 1852 was controversial, and widely reported in the press, describing Atherton’s son as a "boy judge".

=== Contribution to Batticaloa ===
As A.G.A, Atherton made several contributions to the Eastern Province initiating a number of reforms. He encouraged improvements to agriculture, opened up job opportunities, funded schools, and improved infrastructure.

Atherton’s presence in the District of Batticaloa, earned him considerable respect. Vol XXIII of the Journal of the Dutch Burgher Union of Ceylon (July 1933) describes Batticaloa during the early years of the British administration (pages 15–17):

"We have now arrived at that stage in the early history of Batticalloa which is marked by the arrival of the Atherton's, who were destined to play an important part of the social and official life of the district"

Outside of his official capacity, Atherton also undertook private enterprise, having established himself as a pioneer planter in Batticaloa, and was the proprietor of several estates in Ceylon. The first Atherton owned systematic cultivation of coconuts took place opposite the Batticaloa obelisk around 1846 at the Kalmunai Estate. This was the second systematic coconut plantation in the Batticaloa area, and was subsequently sold onto his cousin, Philip Meadows Taylor, the novelist. Another of Atherton plantation’s was called Mylemphaville, a 400 acres (160 ha) estate.

== Death and legacy ==
Atherton died at the age of 54 in Trincomalee in 1855, while in service, as acting G.A. of the Eastern Province.

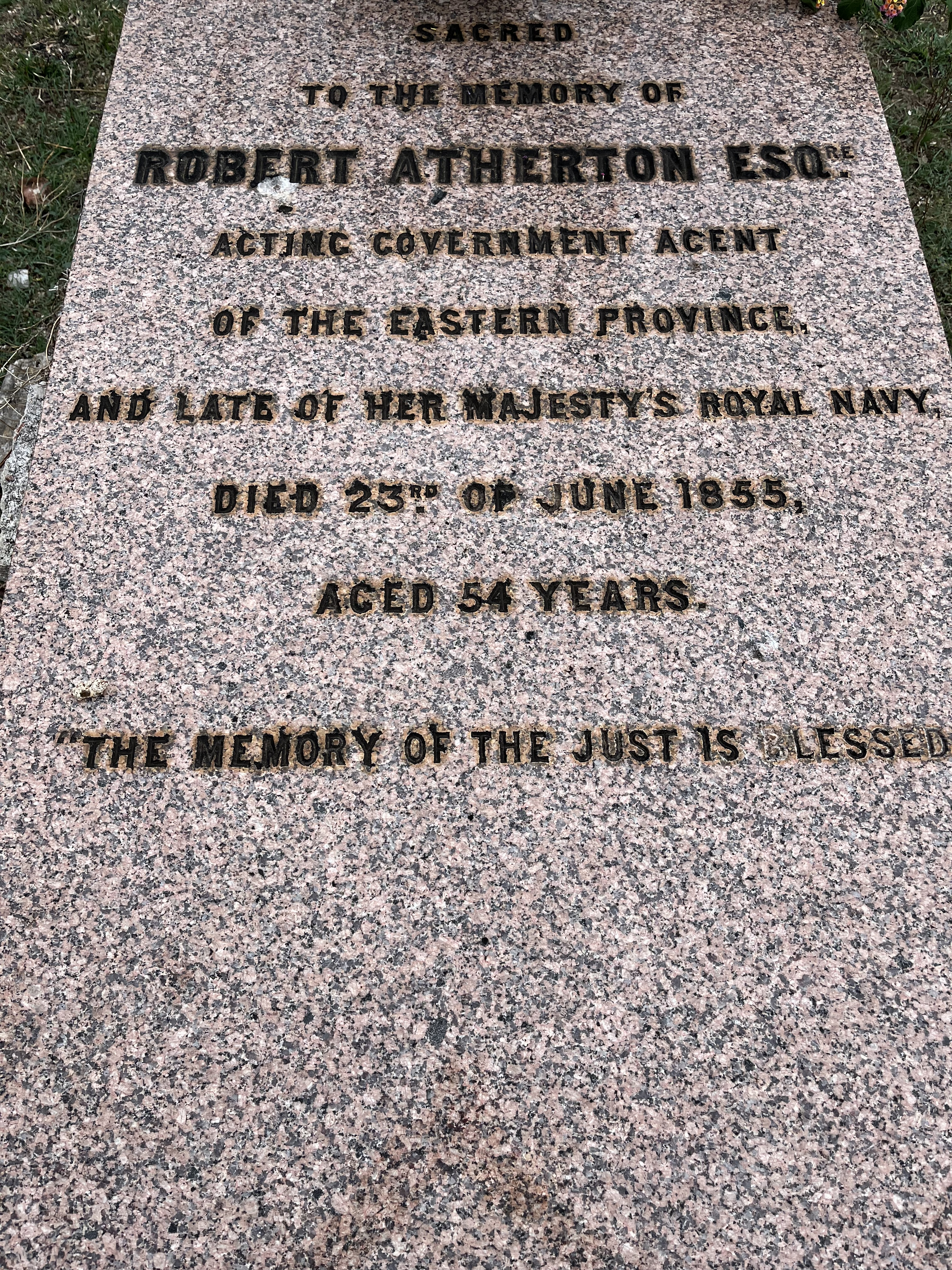
Robert Atherton A.G.A Eastern Province

His annual salary at the time of his death was £950 (worth £128,217.09 as of September 2024).

In 1857, two years after his death, colonial inspector H.G. Ward reported to Henry Labouchère, then Parliamentary Under-Secretary of State for the Colonies, that Atherton’s successor J. Morphew had alleged that the interests of the Crown had been mismanaged by Atherton over a period of time. The allegation was based solely on Morphew’s account.

Atherton was widely respected in his work for the colonial administration. The 5th Colonial Secretary, Sir James Emerson Tennent stated in his work published in 1859 that Atherton, as the A.G.A., in conjunction with Wesleyan Methodist Missionaries, had attempted to enhance the living conditions of the Veddas.

=== Tributes ===
On the 27 June 1855, the Sunday Examiner of Ceylon reported:

"We much regret to announce the death of Robert Atherton, Esq., Govt. Agent in Trincomalee, which event occurred on the 23rd instant. This gentleman was in early life in the Royal Navy, and his bravery and distinguished service were rewarded with a medal and the mention of his name on several occasions in the Admiral’s despatches. As a civil servant of this colony his duties have confined him to the Northern and Eastern Provinces. In both he was remarkable for the singular confidence reposed in him by the native inhabitants, a trust which he returned in the Batticaloa district by effecting the most marked improvements in the manners and morals of the inhabitants. A good man has gone to his rest. Requiescant in pace - Examiner, June 27"

=== Legal publications ===
Atherton is notable, in a historical setting, for outlining or codifying a Customary law of British Ceylon, relatable to the Sri Lankan Mukkuvar. His legal publication of 1835 was titled “Thasawalamy”, which acknowledged the laws and customs of the Malabars of Jaffna.

Further research in the 1890’s stated that these ancient laws outlined by Atherton in the 1830’s were previously promulgated by the Dutch Colonial government of Ceylon and referred to as Tésawalamai. The contemporary name is now Thesavalamai.

== Family background ==
Atherton was born into an influential Lancashire family with connections to both the Atlantic slave trade and the wider triangular trade.

His grandfather, John Atherton, served as High Sheriff of Lancashire in 1780. Atherton spent his early years at Walton Hall in Liverpool before later residing at Street Court in Herefordshire.

Atherton’s Cambridge-educated father served in the court of King George III and for many years acted as the monarch’s personal aide-de-camp (A.D.C.). He enjoyed a distinguished military career, during which he was captured as a prisoner of war under the French Directory and later released on parole at Valenciennes in 1796. His social standing was further enhanced through his marriage into the ancient and noble Mitford family. Atherton’s parents were married in 1796 at St John the Baptist Church in Newcastle upon Tyne, although some accounts suggest the ceremony may have taken place in France.

His maternal aunt, Lewis Tabitha Mitford (1782–1859), was married to Prideaux John Selby, an ornithologist, botanist and natural history artist. His maternal uncle was Rear Admiral Robert Mitford (1781-1870), an ornithological engraver. His cousin was Robert Mitford (1782-1836), a colonial official in Bengal for the East India Company from 1816 to 1828. He was a cousin to Mary Russell Mitford.

In 1828, Atherton’s elder brother, Lieutenant Bertram Mitford Atherton, toured southern France with Commander Edwin Felix of the Royal Navy. Six years later, Atherton’s sister Marianne married the same family friend, Commander Edwin Felix. Their son, Robert Atherton Edwin, later became a renowned meteorologist and weather forecaster in New Zealand.

While Atherton followed his elder brother, into the Navy, his two other brothers pursued military careers in the Army. His eldest brother, Lieutenant John Atherton of the 13th Light Dragoons, died in July 1827 while travelling from Madras to England aboard the Rockingham

His younger brother, Captain Edward Atherton of the 22nd Regiment of Foot, died in India and was buried at St Mary’s Church, Madras, on 1 August 1837. Three years earlier, Edward’s wife had also died at sea while sailing from Bombay aboard the Elora. By this period, Atherton himself was firmly established in Ceylonese society and residing in Batticaloa.

== Personal ==
His wife, Eleanor Toler Burleigh (1810–1893), was the fourth daughter of the late Dr. George Burleigh M.D. and at the time was fifteen years old. George Burleigh, a former surgeon of the 2nd Ceylon Regiment, who had previously served under Lord Howe. His brides’ late father was a Methodist minister who had died in Jaffna, 16 days prior to their wedding day. The wedding ceremony took place in Kayts on 24 April 1826 in the presence his new mother in law, Rebecca Burleigh of Jaffna and Eleanor's siblings.

John, his first son, died three days in after his birth during 1828 and was buried in the compound of the Kayts Resthouse, where a monument still stands in his memory. Kayts is a village on Velanai Island, off the coast of the Jaffna Peninsula in northern Ceylon. Four healthy children followed.

His second son, Robert (1829–1894) was at one time a Second Lieutenant in the Ceylon Rifles Regiment. He joined the C.C.S and for a time worked for the Forestry Department in Chilaw. By 1889 he was a full time planter in Batticaloa, and his younger brother, a surveyor. In his later days, Robert was the Batticaloa correspondent of the Ceylon Examiner and contributed exhaustively to that paper, not only prose articles, but also topical verses, as well as exhaustive descriptions of the habits and use of vegetables within regional cuisine. He established the Atherton tea plantation in Ambagamuwa, Central Province.

His third son, Edward Newnham (1831–1907), began his career in the C.C.S in 1851, obtaining a Writership in 1853, and retired in 1883 after 32 years’ residence without a break on the island and had served as A.G.A in Kurunegala. He spoke Tamil and Sinhala fluently. His son, Edward took over the Mayfield estate, which remained in family hands until it was sold in 1907. In 1869, in what became known as the "Mannar fracas", Edward was found guilty for illegally interfering with a case and of insubordinate conduct. He was demoted, and sent to Colombo to perform the role of landing surveyor. Edward relocated to England and died in Weymouth in 1907. At the time of his father's death he was a writer to the Government Agent (G.A) in Jaffna, his place of birth.

His two sons, Robert and Edward were widely respected by the people of Batticaloa that they were spoken of generally by the local community as "Bob Pillai" and "Ned Pillai". Pillai meaning "Child of King" (Prince) in Tamil.

His eldest daughter was Eleanor Burleigh Atherton (1833–1893), who married Dr James Cornish Sortain M.D. on 24 July 1854 in Batticaloa. Sortain was the brother of the nonconformist minister, Joseph Sortain. Sortain was a well known planter, medical physician and philanthropist, and the first to cultivate coconuts in the early 1840s. As Mrs Sortain, she took over the Tannamunai estate. Eleanor gave birth to 2 sons after her fathers death. His son in law was much respected by the people of Batticaloa, since he was intimately connected with the first systematic cultivation of the coconuts in the early 1840s. This took place 5 miles from the town of Batticaloa, beside the lake. The 640 acres (260 ha) estate was known as Tannamunai. After Sortain’s death, ownership passed to Atherton’s daughter, Sortain’s widow.

His youngest children were the twins George Redesdale Atherton (1836–1838) and Marianne Mitford Atherton (1836–1879). Marianne later married Robert Massie C.C.S., and upon her death at the age of 43 in 1879, she was laid to rest alongside her husband.

The Ceylon Almanac of 1855 records Atherton and his son Robert within the list of European residents of Trincomalee.

Atherton died on 23 June 1855 and was put to rest in the burial ground on the Esplanade in Trincomalee, now referred to as St. Stephen's Church Cemetery. His marble headstone has been restored and is in close proximity to that of Rear Admiral Charles John Austen (1779–1852), the brother of the novelist Jane Austen; Charles died at sea of cholera prior to Atherton. The circumstances of Atherton’s death in service of the crown are unknown. His tombstone reads:

"Sacred to the memory of Robert Atherton Esq. Acting Government Agent of the Eastern Province, and late of Her Majesty’s Royal Navy". Along with his age and date of death it states "The memory of the just is blessed"

His wife and children remained in Ceylon after his death. A cousin Betram Mitford RN, age 32, paymaster on HMS Cossack drowned in Trincomalee harbour on 10 July 1869 while trying to swim back to his vessel after dining on shore.

His widow, Eleanor, died on 24 July 1893 as a result of a carriage accident, and was buried in the old cemetery in Batticaloa. Eleanor was 83 at the time of her death having been a continuous resident of Batticaloa for 52 years. Eleanor was referred to as the widow of Rodney Atherton, Ceylon Civil Service. Several other historical documents have erroneously referred to him as Rodney, instead of Robert.

== See also ==
- Walton Hall, Liverpool
- First Anglo-Burmese War
- Ceylon Civil Service
- Government Agent (Sri Lanka)
- Wesleyan Methodist Mission, North Ceylon
- Methodist Church in Sri Lanka
- American Ceylon Mission
- Kachcheri
- Old Park
