= James Walton (MP for Preston) =

16th-century English politician

James Walton (1479/80–1546/50), of Preston, Lancashire, was an English politician.

== Career ==
He was Mayor of Preston in 1526–27, ?1532–33, ?1533–34 and 1546.

He was a member (MP) of the parliament of England for Preston in 1529.
