= Christopher Haydock =

16th-century English politician

Christopher Haydock (by 1499 – 1566 or later) was an English politician.

He was the son of Gilbert Haydock of Cottam, near Preston, Lancashire. He was elected Mayor of Preston from 1528 to 1531. He was elected a Member (MP) of the Parliament of England for Preston in 1529.

Haydock was married with at least two sons.

Joseph Gillow was a descendant of Haydock who was one of the Haydocks of Cottam.
