= Walton Hall Park =

Public park in Liverpool, England

Coordinates: 53°26′53″N 2°57′07″W

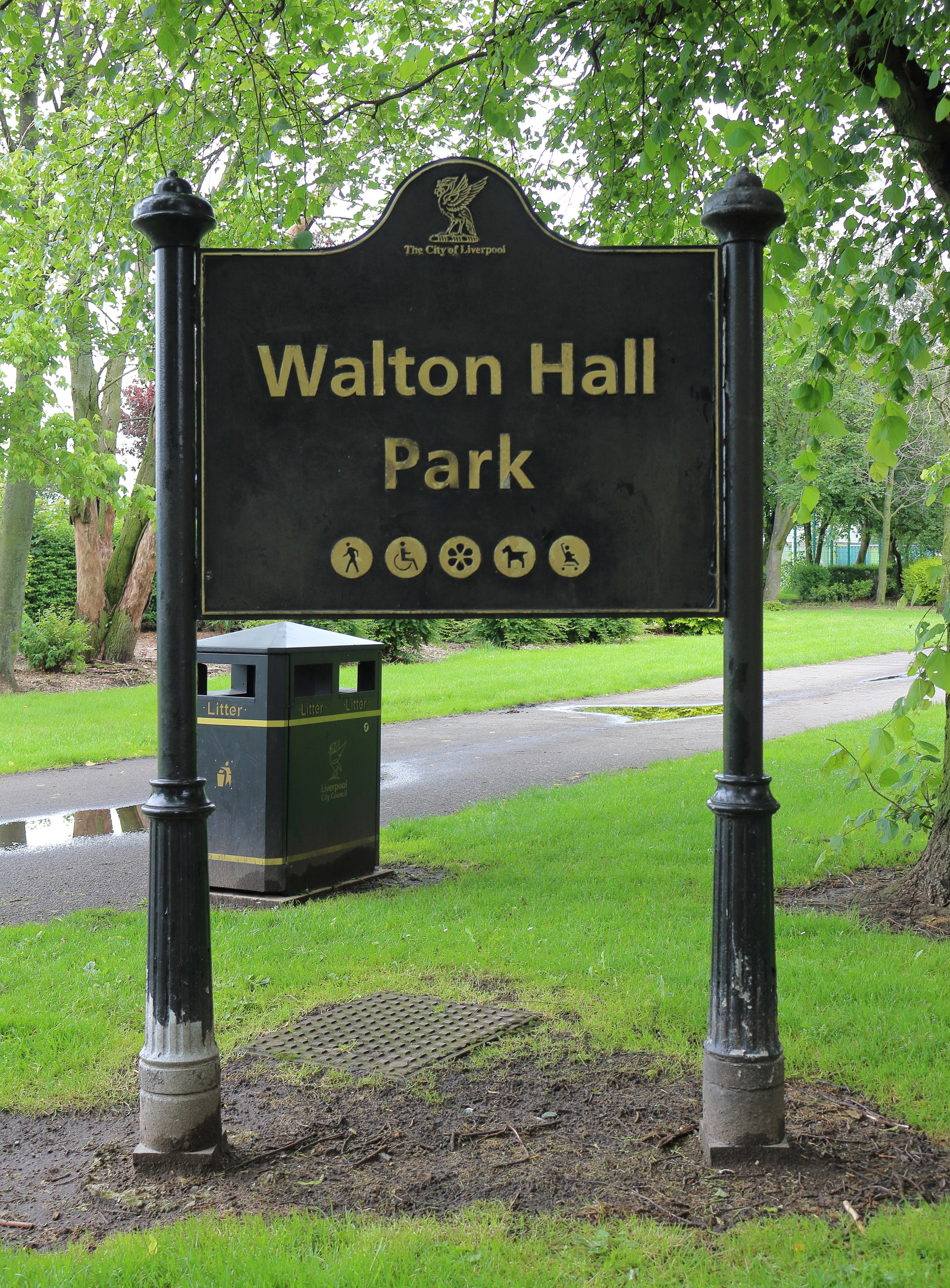
- Interactive map of Walton Hall Park
- Type: Public Park
- Location: Walton, Liverpool, England
- Area: 130 acres (0.53 km^{2})
- Established: 18 July 1934

Walton Hall Park in Walton, Liverpool, England is a 130-acre (0.53 km^{2}) park. It was opened to the public on 18 July 1934 by King George V when he visited Liverpool to open the Queensway Tunnel. The origins of the park date back to Henry de Walton, steward of the West Derby hundred in 1199.

The park contains two lakes. The larger lake has two islands and is inhabited by several large carps, bream and tench fishes as well as a large number of skimmer breams, roaches and perches. The smaller lake has a path running around the perimeter.

From September 2019 to June 2025, Everton F.C. Women of the FA Women's Super League played their home games at the main grandstand.

== See also ==
- Walton Hall, Liverpool
