= Wesleyan Methodist Mission, North Ceylon =

Christian mission in modern-day Sri Lanka

Wesleyan Methodist Mission, North Ceylon was formed as part of the Wesleyan Methodist Mission of Ceylon, the oldest Wesleyan Mission to be established in East in 1814. The North Ceylon Mission was established to specifically cater to the Tamil speaking Sri Lankans in Jaffna, Trincomalee and Batticaloa where Methodist Missionaries established number of schools and churches. It also catered to the indigenous Vedda people.

== See also ==
- Peter Percival (1803 - 1882) was one of the Mission's prominent educators.
- Robert Atherton (civil servant)
