= Harry Cartmell =

British politician and lawyer (1857–1923)

Sir Harry Cartmell JP

Mayor of Preston
- In office 1913–1919

Personal details
- Born: 18 March 1857 Manchester, England
- Died: 11 May 1923 (aged 66)
- Occupation: Solicitor

Sir Harry Cartmell JP (18 March 1857 – 11 May 1923) was an English solicitor who served as Mayor of Preston, from 1913 to 1919, during the whole period of the First World War. He was the author of For Remembrance, published in 1919, which was a memoir of his experiences in Preston during the war.

Cartmell was born in Manchester and admitted a solicitor in 1893, and was also a justice of the peace for Lancashire and chairman of Preston Education Committee. He was knighted in the 1920 New Year Honours for his services to Preston, especially as mayor throughout the First World War and to education in the borough.
