= Richard Bernard Godfrey =

English engraver

- Born: 1728; London, England
- Died: Unknown
- Occupation: Engraver

Richard Bernard Godfrey (born 1728) was an English engraver.

== Biography ==
Godfrey was born in London in 1728. He is principally known as an engraver of views and antiquities. Many of these were done from his own drawings, and, if of little artistic value, have considerable archæological interest. Most of them were executed for Francis Grose's "Antiquarian Repertory" in 1775, a work which Godfrey appears to have had some share in editing. Others appeared in Grose's "Antiquities of England and Wales." Godfrey also engraved some portraits, including J. G. Holman, the actor, after Samuel De Wilde; Samuel Foote, the actor, after Jean-François Gilles Colson; and the Rev. William Gostling, author of a "Walk about Canterbury" in 1777. Godfrey exhibited some sea pieces, after Charles Brooking, and other engravings at the Society of Artists from 1765 to 1770. He also engraved plates for John Bell's "British Theatre."
