= List of mayors of Preston =

The following people were mayors of Preston, Lancashire, England:

== Early modern period ==
- 1526-27 James Walton, MP for Preston, 1529
- 1528-31 Christopher Haydock, MP for Preston, 1529
- 1532-34 James Walton
- 1535 William Wall
- 1545 Henry Walls, MP for Preston, (1545)
- 1546-46 James Walton
- 1566 Evan Wall
- 1642 Adam Morte
- 1696 John Atherton
- 1700 George Addison
- 1701-02 Josias Gregson
- 1702 Geoffrey Rishton
- 1703 William Lemon
- 1704 John Atherton
- 1705 Thomas Winckley
- 1706 John Chorley
- 1707 Roger Sudell
- 1708 George Addison
- 1709 John Loxham
- 1710 George Lamplugh
- 1711 William Graddwell (Gladwell)
- 1712 Ralph Assheton
- 1713 Edmund Assheton
- 1714 Lawrence Wall
- 1715 William Lemon
- 1716 Robert Chaddocks
- 1717 Joseph Curtis
- 1718 Richard Casson
- 1719 George Lamplugh
- 1720 William Graddwell
- 1721-22 Edmund Assheton
- 1722 Lawrence Wall
- 1723 John Thornton
- 1724 John Clayton
- 1725 Thomas Garlicke
- 1726 John Myers
- 1727 Richard Addison
- 1728 Joseph Curtis
- 1729 Edmund Ashton (Assheton)
- 1730 Lawrence Wall
- 1731 Sir Edward Stanley, bart.
- 1732: William Atherton (1703-1745)
- 1738: William Atherton (1703-1745)

== 19th century ==
- 1802–03: Samuel Horrocks, MP for Preston, 1804
- 1861-62: Robert Townley Parker, Guild Mayor of Preston in 1861–2.
- 1868-69: John James Myres, founder of Myres and Newton
- 1873-74: John James Myres
- 1899-1900 James Yates Foster

== 20th century ==
- 1901-02: Frederick Stanley, 16th Earl of Derby, MP for Preston, 1865 and Governor General of Canada
- 1902-03: Alderman E. Greenwood (Conservative)
- 1903-04 James Craven
- 1913-19: Harry Cartmell
- 1934-35: Robert C. Handley
- 1946-47: William Beckett
- 1963-64: Cyril Evan Molyneux
- 1964-65: Joseph Lund
- 1965-66: William Beckett
- 1966-67: Joseph Holden
- 1982-83: Joseph Saul Pownall
- 1991-92: Mary Rawcliffe

== 21st century ==
Source: Preston City Council

- 2000-01 Joseph Hood
- 2001-02 Alan Lester Hackett
- 2002-03 Jonathan Saksena
- 2003-04 Neil Cartwright
- 2004-05 Patricia Woods
- 2005-06 Bhikhu Patel
- 2006-07 William Tyson
- 2007-08 Christine Abram
- 2008-09 John Swindells
- 2009-10 Keith Sedgewick
- 2010-11 Albert Richardson
- 2011-12 Bobby Cartwright
- 2012-13 Carl Crompton
- 2013-14 Veronica Afrin
- 2014-15 Nicholas Pomfret
- 2015-16 Margaret MacManus
- 2016-17 John Collins
- 2017-18 Brian Rollo
- 2018-19 Trevor Hart
- 2019-21 David Borrow
- 2021-22 Javed Iqbal JP
- 2022-23 Neil Darby
- 2023-24 Yakub Patel
- 2024-25 Philip Crowe
- 2025-26 Sue Whittam
- 2026-27 Nweeda Khan
