= William Atherton (mayor of Preston) =

Mayor of Preston

William Atherton (c.1705-5 August 1745), of Greenbank and Pendleton Hall, was a Preston Guild merchant and landowner. He was twice elected as Mayor of Preston; once in 1732, and again in 1738. A silk mercer by trade, he became a successful Lancashire guild merchant, woollen draper, and was an influential figure in Preston's business community, which was focused on textile manufacturing and commerce.

== Life ==
His wealth was derived from the profits of trade including slavery, initially from operations from the port of Preston, and then from the port of Liverpool, where his elder brother John relocated to in 1716, in order to open up new investment opportunities. Whilst only in his early twenties, Atherton had already executed a quadripartite agreement between commercial parties by the sum of £1,918 to one party, with Atherton and his two partners granting £635 to another. This trade agreement signed on 2 February 1726 involved parties located in Wigan, London, Liverpool and Charleston, South Carolina. Two years later he was leasing property from Sir Henry Hoghton, 5th Baronet. It is possible that Atherton shared similar dissenting religious views against the Jacobite rebellions as Houghton, as well as his peers, the borough-reeve.

His father, John Atherton of Preston, was a successful and wealthy woollen draper Both his paternal and maternal ancestors originated from Chipping, Lancashire. His father had served as Guild Mayor of Preston in 1696 and 1704.

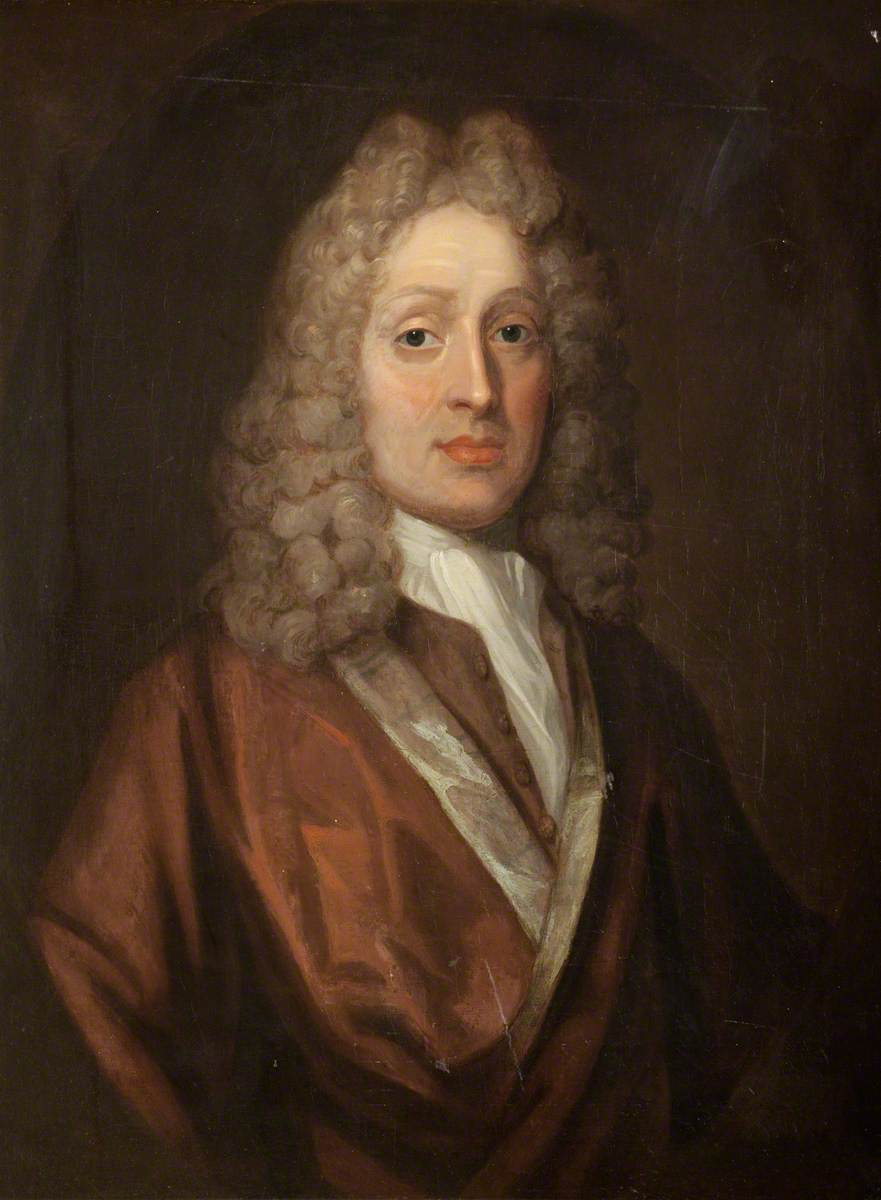
John Atherton, circa 1700

His father married Catherine White in 1704 whilst Mayor of Preston.

By 1724 William Atherton was seeking political debate in Parliament on the purchase large tracks of land in the Lancashire. He acquired additional land seeking to enlarge his estate by entering an agreement to purchase land from Edward Stanley, 11th Earl of Derby

Atherton held various public roles in Preston and served as town bailiff in 1724, becoming a councilman in 1728. In 1731 he was elected as the Alderman of the Borough, a position he held up right until his death. Gaining position in society, as well as the trust of the other influential local merchantmen, he was elected to serve as Mayor of Preston from 1732 to 1733, and 1738 to 1739, which involved hosting charitable events as well as considerable entertaining of visiting dignitaries. Guild spectacles were well attended, however the larger ceremonies took place on a 20-year cycle, which involved leading more ostentatious pageants and marches, over a 30-day period. Atherton's period in office coincided with the final surge of Jacobism leading up to the rise of 1745. Outside of ceremonial events as mayor in 1738, he is recorded to have administered the "Henry and Eleanor Rishton Charity" with the sole aim of the education and betterment of the poor people of Preston. He was also a trustee of that same charity in a private capacity. Records show that he was an active Steward of the Guild during the ceremonies of 1742. He appears in an illustrated copy of The Guild Merchant of Preston in 1743.

== The portrait of William Atherton and his wife Lucy ==
Atherton was a close friend and political associate of Anthony Devis, a painter, Jacobite sympathiser, and the father of Arthur Devis. With the purpose of enhancing his social standing even further, Atherton commissioned Devis to paint him and his wife Lucy in 1744, who he married in 1730 and had 5 children with. The painting itself provides an indication Atherton's wealth and taste. Whilst his wife is seated in a white satin dress, he is standing at a safe distance from her, wearing a brown coat and a white silk sheen waistcoat and watched over by the family dog. The artist incorporated his tried and tested backdrop; the landscaped garden, which can be seen through the window in this painting. However the genuine backdrop would have been of both residential and commercial buildings, since the Atherton’s property was located on the market square itself in the middle of Preston. The artist has also added several stock features such as a mahogany cabinet, gilt carving, furniture upholstery and an ornate porcelain urn inside the fireplace, each featured in earlier portrayals of persons of influence, and incorporated to reflect the taste and expectations of those commissioning him.

Preston historians such as Aidan Turner-Bishop have questioned the display of affluence of a provincial merchant, who became involved in the Triangular trade at a young age, citing it as the likely source of his wealth.

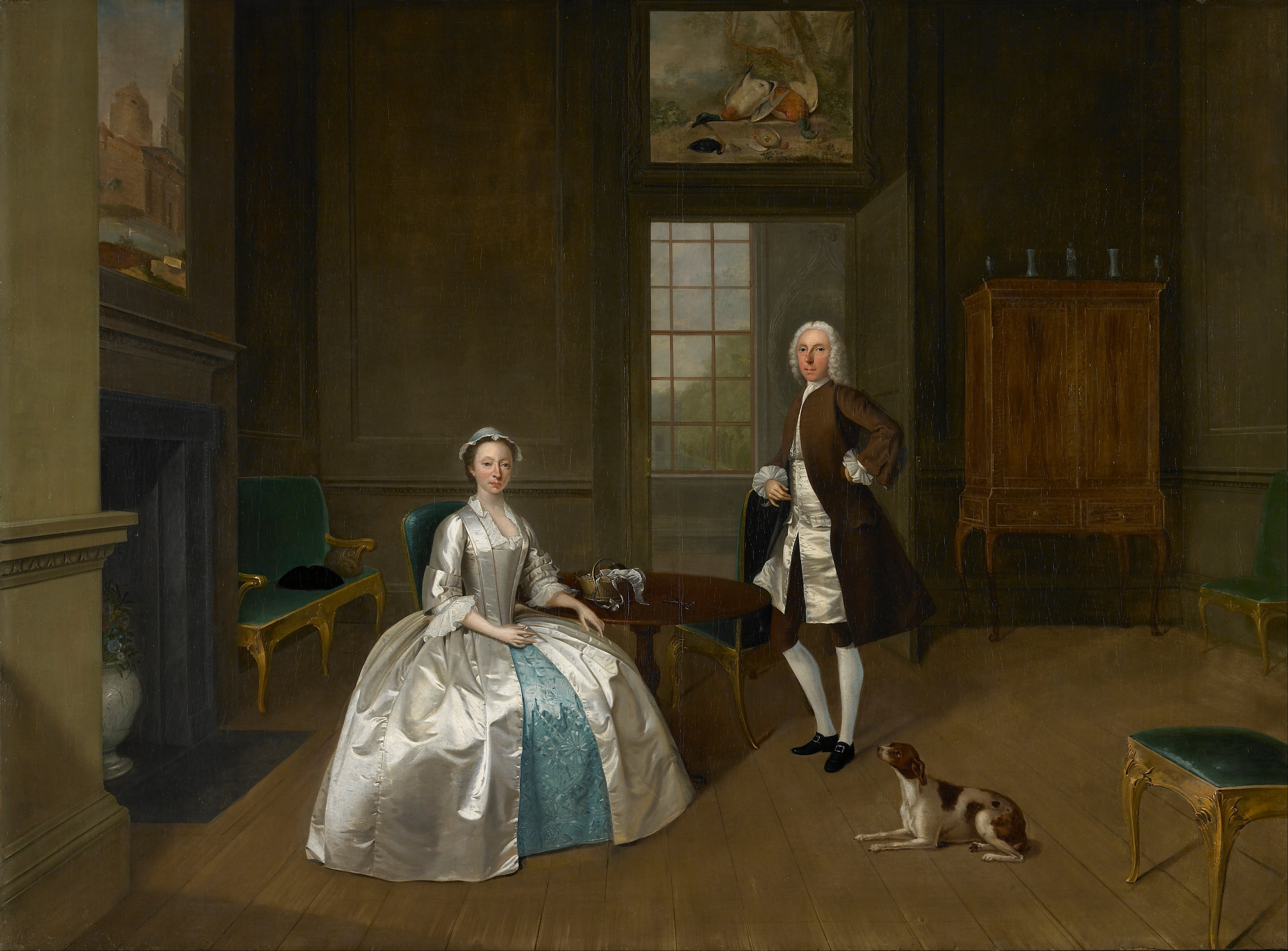
Mr and Mrs William Atherton - Walker Art Gallery

This portrait of Atherton and his wife Lucy was painted a year before his death. His patronage would have certainly helped Arthur Devis career. His wife was painted by the same artist as an older lady.

His sibling, the Reverend Richard Atherton sat for the artist, Edward Haytley, with historians citing reference to his brother, who at the time of the sitting was Mayor of Preston.

== Slave trading and commerce ==
Atherton's elder brother, John Atherton of Hanover Street, Liverpool, was highly involved in the African slave trade, with at least 18 slave voyages taking place between 1737 and 1757. As a merchant, Atherton would have been an active shareholder in various Liverpool shipping companies and would have been guided by his elder brother. Since slave trading syndicates were often agreements limited between just a handful of individuals, Atherton may have been one of the many who financed such ventures as a silent partner, whilst his Liverpool-based brother, John was the signatory for the Atherton family. The same would have applied to the Liverpool privateering syndicates set up in 1739, of which his brother John was a stakeholder. Thurloe, a hackboat captured the Admiral of Bordeaux as a prize ship during June 1745. A considerable return on their investment having taken ownership of the French vessel and renamed it as the Bulkeley.

== Atherton vs. Atherton as a consequence of his fatal accident and his mental capacity to leave a Will ==
In July 1745, Atherton suffered a severe fever and infection. In a state of delirium he threw himself down a well. Atherton survived the fall but considered it prudent to draw up his last Will and Testament. His fever returned, his health deteriorated and he died shortly after. As a consequence of his unexpected death, a dispute arose between the guardians of his young children in relation to his state of mind at the time the Will was witnessed. Atherton v. Atherton (PRO: PL 10/176) became a notable case under English law where medical evidence was taken during legal proceedings. The court decided that Atherton was indeed of sound mind when the will was made. Witnesses were cross-examined when they gave evidence that his mental capacity diminished only after the document was signed and was determined by the court to be legally binding. Atherton died in Preston and was buried on 5 August 1745, just weeks before the Jacobite rising came to Preston. A meeting of the cooperation was called on 8 August to elect Richard Shepherd as alderman to replace him, however since only 10 were present it was declared invalid until April 1746. It was Shepherd who visited him daily and gave evidence that he had dialogue with Atherton on a daily basis in the aftermath of the well incident and declared him as having full control of one's mind.

== Legacy ==
His primary home overlooked the market place. It was demolished by the town in the 19th century to make way for the Harris Museum.

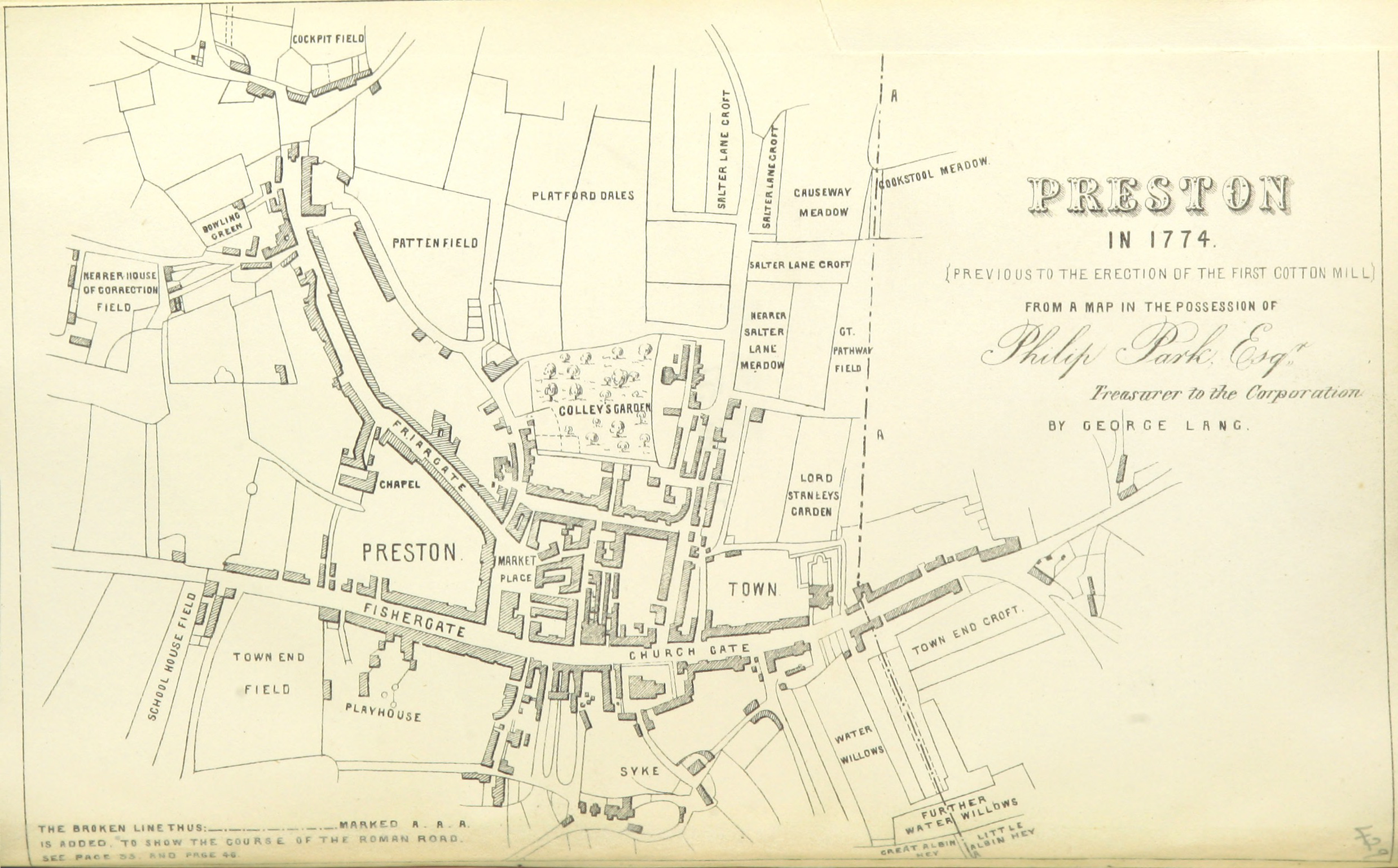
Preston in the 18th century

Atherton's home, "Greenbank" was set back on land north of Fylde Road. William Tunnicliffe, land surveyor in 1781 described it as "a neat residence, surrounded with gardens and shrubberies…laid out in a tasteful manner." It was situated in the vicinity of Greenbank Street and Fylde Road. It is no longer in existence. By 1870 Atherton Street passed directly over the site of Green Bank House.

All his sons became merchants, traders, investors, lawyers and bankers. His second son, Richard (1737-1804) followed his mayoral footsteps in the 1780s by being elected on two occasions, and was also a partner at Atherton, Greaves and Co, who established Preston Old Bank in 1776. His third son Henry was a barrister and the father of Eleanora Atherton . His fourth son, William Atherton, became a merchant and owner of a sugar cane plantation in Jamaica, which was also vested in the names of his other children.

His wife Lucy never remarried. She was buried on 5 October 1796.
