= James Allan Park =

British judge and legal writer

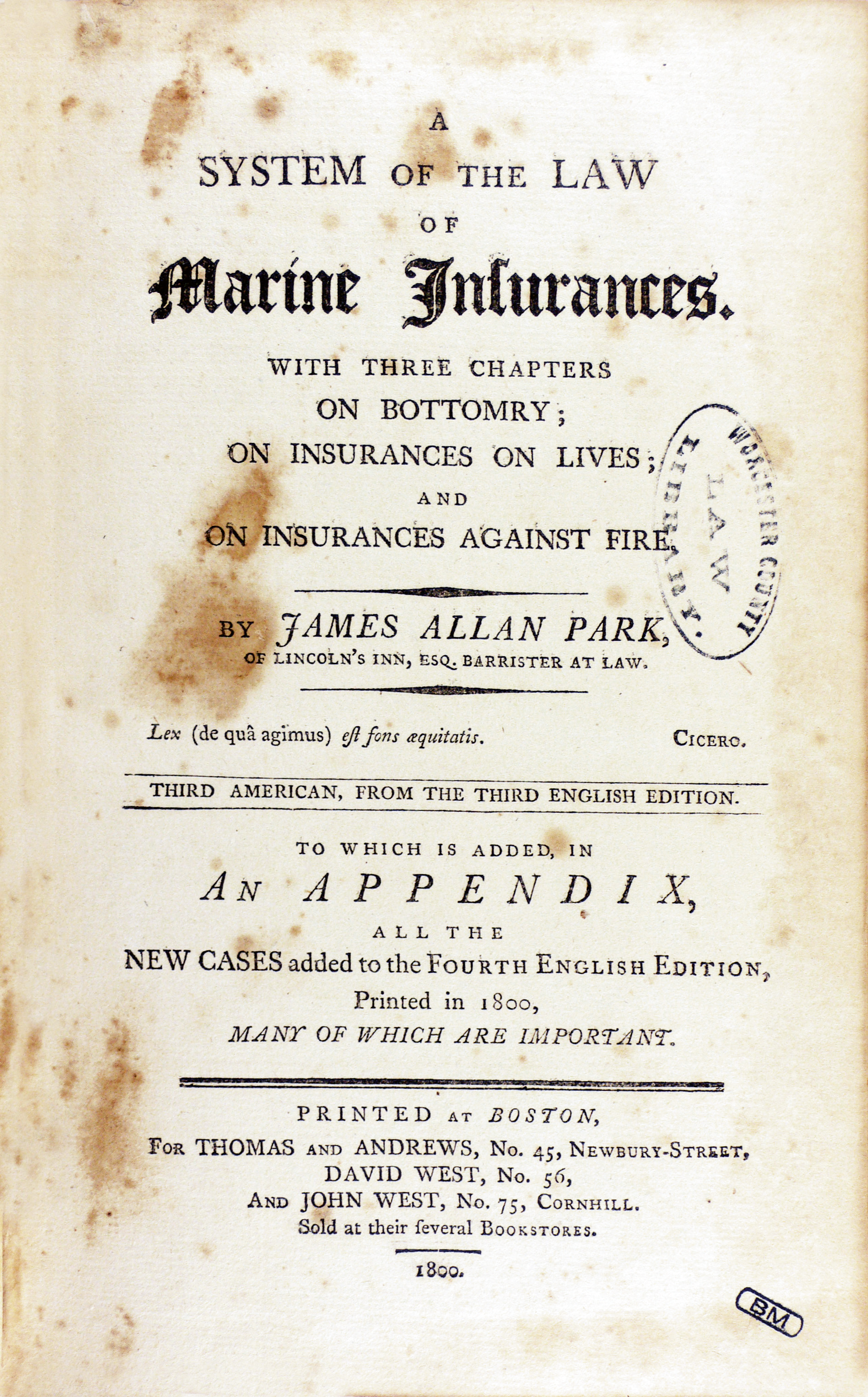
A system of the law of marine insurances, 1800.

Sir James Allan Park KC (6 April 1763 – 8 December 1838) was a British judge and legal writer.

== Life ==
He was the son of James Park, a surgeon from Edinburgh, and was brought up in Edinburgh until his father's practice moved to Surrey. He was educated first at Northampton Grammar School and then at Lincoln's Inn. He was called to the bar on 18 June 1784 and in 1787 published a Treatise on the Law of Marine Insurance, which was reprinted six times during his life. That book drew much on the cases of Lord Mansfield. It brought him a good practice. As an advocate, he made more of a reputation for persuasion than for eloquence.

Park married Lucy, the daughter of Richard Atherton on 1 January 1791. His father-in-law was a woollen-draper in Preston, and a partner in the Preston Old Bank, when opened under the firm of Messrs. Atherton, Greaves, and Denison.

In 1791, Park was appointed Vice-Chancellor of the Duchy of Lancaster and in 1795 became a Recorder of Preston, seen as the first step towards becoming a judge. He became a King's Counsel in 1799, Attorney General of the County Palatine of Durham in 1802 and Attorney-General of Lancaster in 1811. He was made one of the Justices of the Court of Common Pleas on 22 January 1816 and knighted at the same time. He received a DCL from Oxford University in 1834 and died on 8 December 1838, leaving two sons: James Allan Park, who became a cleric, and Alexander Atherton Park, who became a barrister.

He was said to bear a striking physical resemblance to King George III. This led to much gossip about his true paternity. He dismissed all such talk with the remark: "King George III was never in Scotland and my mother was never out of Scotland".

Legal offices
Preceded by Unknown	Justice of the Common Pleas; 1816–1838	Succeeded by Unknown
