= Ralph L. Atherton =

American politician (1842–1916)

Ralph Lockwood Atherton

Member of the Massachusetts House of Representatives for the 3rd Franklin County District
- Incumbent
- Assumed office 1889

Personal details
- Born: June 30, 1842 Gill, Massachusetts, United States
- Died: December 20, 1916 (aged 74) Deerfield, Massachusetts
- Party: Democratic
- Occupation: Farmer, Soldier, Politician

Ralph Lockwood Atherton (June 30, 1842 – December 20, 1916) was an American politician from Gill, Massachusetts, who served in the Massachusetts House of Representatives after being elected to the 110th Massachusetts General Court in 1888 for the 3rd District of Franklin County, Massachusetts.

== Early life ==
Atherton was born into a farming community in Gill, Massachusetts. His father, Zora Atherton (1811–1903) was a local farmer, as were his paternal ancestors. His mother was Mary Ann Porter Phillips (1818–1880), the daughter of Israel Bascom Phillips and Dorothy Sage. He was educated in public schools in Franklin County, Massachusetts.

== Career ==
He was a soldier in the American Civil War from Massachusetts, prior to being a state legislator for Massachusetts during the late 19th century; a veteran of the 10th Massachusetts Infantry Regiment. He was badly injured in the Battle of Seven Pines, losing an arm. His elder brother, William Bugbee Atherton also served in the same regiment.

Atherton was elected as a Democratic candidate at a state level in 1888, and served in the Massachusetts House of Representatives in the 1889 legislature, in the 110th Massachusetts General Court. With an extensive record of public service, he later became chairman of the Board of selectmen.

He was a close friend of Massachusetts Governor William E. Russell, who appointed him as a Justice of the peace. He later served his local community in a number of other official roles, initially in Montague, and from 1889, in Turners Falls.

A lifelong Democrat, and an early supporter of William Jennings Bryan, Atherton was a delegate to the Democratic National Convention in 1896, which took place in Chicago, and notable for Bryan’s Cross of Gold speech, considered as one of the greatest political speeches in American history.

== Personal life ==
Atherton had ten siblings. He married Alma J. Bascom on December 18, 1863, in Gill, Massachusetts after being honorably discharged. They had three daughters. He died in Deerfield, Massachusetts on December 20, 1916.

== Ancestry ==
Atherton was a New England descendant of Puritan heritage, whose ancestors had settled in Massachusetts Bay Colony. He is a direct descendant of Major General Humphrey Atherton, via Hope Atherton and Sarah Hollister (1646–1691) who moved to the region in the 17th century. His relatives include Samuel Atherton, Ray Atherton, Adelbert S. Atherton, Arlon S. Atherton, Percy Lee Atherton and Walter Atherton.
