= Frederick Atherton =

American politician (1865–1936)

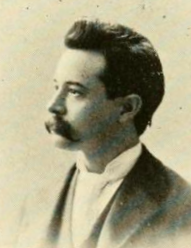
Frederick Atherton (Massachusetts House of Representatives, 1896 legislature)

Frederick William Atherton (August 6, 1865 – April 4, 1936) was an American businessman from Boston, Massachusetts. He was a founding Trustee of Wentworth Institute of Technology and of other various academic institutions. He was associated with a number of foundations and charitable trusts. He served a single term in the Massachusetts House of Representatives after being elected to the 117th Massachusetts General Court in 1895 for the 21st district. He was a prominent social figure in Washington, D.C., for over 25 years, until his sudden death in 1936.

== Early life ==
Atherton was born into a wealthy and influential Boston family. His father, William Atherton (1821–1891) had co-owned "Atherton, Stetson and Company", leather merchants and one of Boston's most successful businesses at the time. His father and paternal uncle were one of Boston’s largest taxpayers. His father was also the vice president of the Home Savings Bank, and a director of the First National Bank of Boston which was founded in 1864. It is the management of wealth that would later stimulate Atherton.

His mother was Mary Edwards Dwight (1838–1915), the daughter of William R. Dwight And Mary Warren Fiske of Brooklyn, New York. His mother was the great great granddaughter of Jonathan Edwards. Her educational heritage also included Timothy Dwight IV.

His paternal uncle, Samuel Atherton (1815–1895), is credited to having greatly improved the financial standing of the family, having established himself in business as a retail dealer in boots and shoes, first entering into partnership with Caleb Stetson, then admitting his two younger brothers, James Atherton (1819–1879) and William (Frederick Atherton’s father), as partners in 1852. Samuel was a director of the New England Bank, Prescott Insurance Company, Massachusetts Loan and Trust Company, President of the Dorchester Gas-Light Company, Director of the Central Massachusetts Railroad, as well as being connected with many other corporations. Samuel was a member of the Massachusetts General Court in 1867, 1870 and 1877.

Atherton attended the Boston Latin School, and subsequently sent to Phillips Academy, a preparatory school in Andover, Massachusetts. He entered Harvard in February 1884, and studied alongside Alanson B. Houghton, Augustus Peabody Gardner, Horace Paul Thurlow, William Mark Noble, Irving Wetherbee Fay, Charles Samuel Babcock and Harold Taylor Chase in the Class of 1886. During the final year at Harvard University, Atherton appears to have elected to be known as Frederic. He suffered with health complications during this period of his life.

He acquired considerable inherited wealth whilst in his twenties, and traveled extensively within Europe.

== Career ==
Although initially affiliated with Harvard University faculty, by the age of 25, he was a broker for Fuller, Harding & Co; and shortly after moved to A. B. Turner & Brothers in 1890. He subsequently became a writer of editorials of a financial nature for Boston newspapers, principally for the Boston Evening Transcript. He is described as a commercial reporter. Atherton was named as a trustee for his family's interests, following the death of his father.

He was elected as a Republican candidate at a state level in 1895, in the footsteps of his paternal uncle, and served in the Massachusetts House of Representatives in the 1896 legislature, in the 117th General Court for the 21st district. His profession again is listed as a commercial reporter.

However fiduciary responsibility was where he could demonstrate his own integrity. In 1904 he was named one of three trustees to administer the portion of the estate of the late Arioch Wentworth, which was set up to establish the Wentworth Institute of Technology in 1904. The Wentworth estate was valued in excess of $7 million. This was equivalent to $221 million+ (as of 2021). Wentworth’s Last Will and Testament, written two months before he died, was contested by his daughter, Susan Willoughby Stuart; now the wife of a British diplomat, and former British Consul to Boston, since the more recent Last Will and Testament from 1904, directed the bulk of this fortune and legacy, away from descendants, to be used to "found a school to furnish education in the mechanical arts". The Willoughby Stuart’s faced economic challenges, even prior to the court case; yet following nine months of negotiation, Arioch Wentworth's estate was split; his descendants and the directors of Wentworth Institute, each were left with approximately $3.5 million. Atherton who had also been an executor of Wentworth’s Last Will and Testament, was appointed as Secretary and a Director, with Paul W. Watson (the late A. Wentworth’s lawyer), now as Treasurer and Director. Atherton was involved right from the inception, through concept, the campus design and build, onto the opening of the Wentworth Institute to fee paying students in 1911, and throughout the next 25 years of operation. Contemporary articles by Harvard at the time also specified the Wentworth Institute possessed a significant $3,000,000+ endowment. There was much press coverage, as well as justifiable concerns amongst the directors of Wentworth Institute, and Boston Brahmin that the money should remain invested in the United States for educational purposes. Although it was not the sum Atherton had anticipated, the next eight years would bolster his reputation as a trustee within the field of education, and elevate his status in society. At the same time he became substantially wealthy.

By 1912, he was residing primarily in Washington, D.C., and moving within diplomatic and political circles, with Walter L. Fisher, the United States Secretary of the Interior, who would later send 5 of his sons to study at Harvard. Atherton was already a member of the Metropolitan Club in Washington, D.C., of which the then U.S. President, William Howard Taft was also member. His focus at the time, apart from being listed as a trustee of a large educational fund, a financial and commercial writer is largely unknown at this time. It appears that he never practiced law, and focused on high level networking. His prominence in society depended on how he managed his own assets (personal trusts), which emanated from inherited wealth, both from 19th century manufacturing, and financial enterprises in New England. He remained Secretary for Wentworth Institute and with that success, came further recognition.

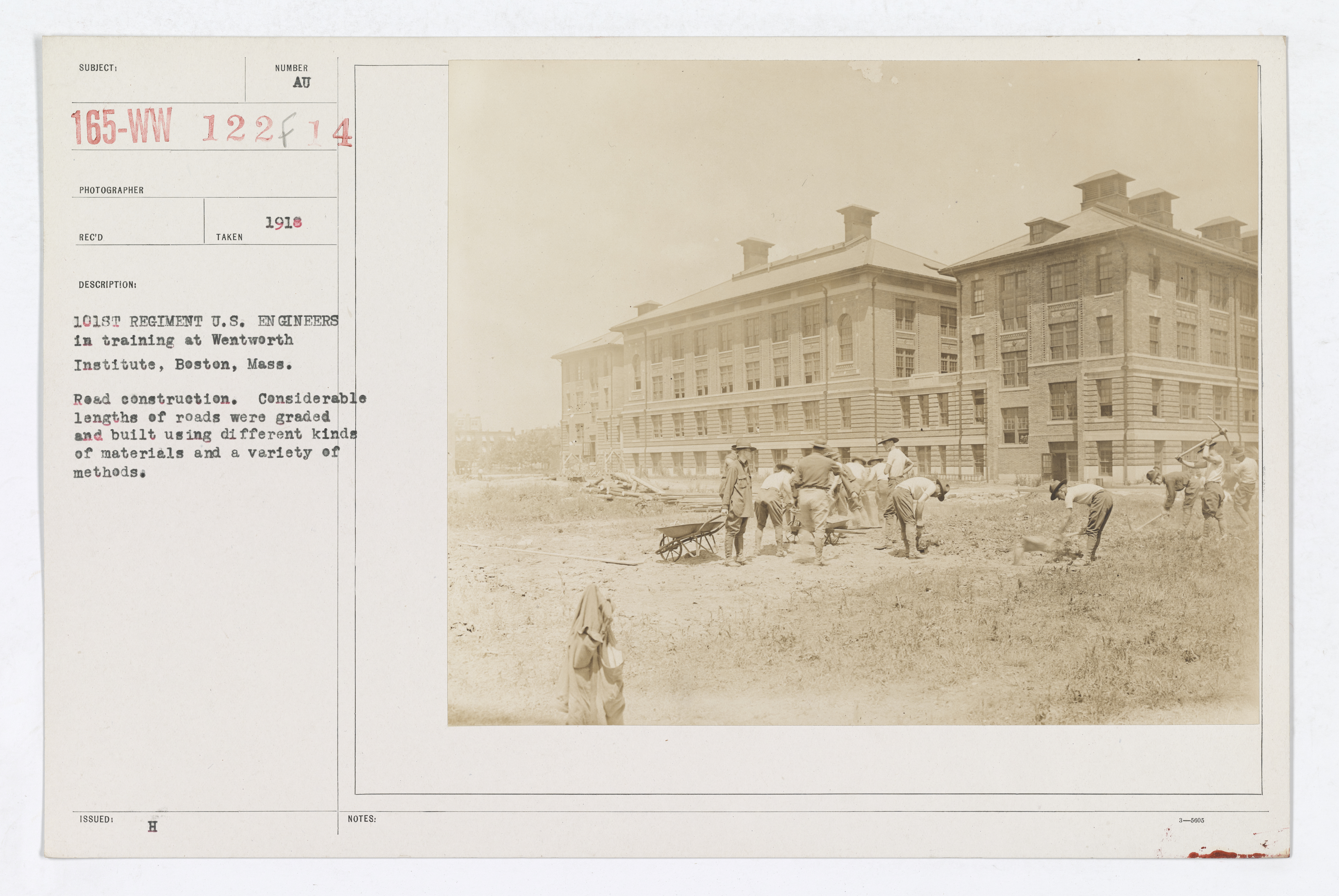
Wentworth Institute (1918)

The trusts that he managed were soon not just limited to Boston. Having made in-roads into The Establishment in Washington, D.C., he became a trustee of George Washington University, which had a far larger endowment. Within his network of influence was Lucius Littauer, whose family source of wealth was manufactured leather products, whilst Atherton’s father had traded such goods. Littauer and Atherton shared a common Harvard heritage, along with a passion for travels in Europe, which then evolved into mutual educational interests, since Atherton was a trustee for various funds relating to educational work.

After spending a number of winter seasons in the Sixteenth Street Historic District, 1149 16th St became a permanent place of residence, where he moved in prominent circles. Atherton’s financial good standing gave him access to a wide range of political figures, such as members of congress, foreign service officials, foreign diplomats to be introduced to innovative educators and academics. This also provided opportunities to cultivate potential donors for his philanthropic causes, focused on improving educational opportunities. In 1913 he entertained Henry White (1850–1927) and Margaret "Daisy" Stuyvesant Rutherford (1853–1916) at his home. White had been a diplomat during the 1890s and 1900s who served as United States Ambassador to France and Italy, at this time was advocating for neutrality in the run up to the First World War, and would eventually be a signatory of the Treaty of Versailles at the end of hostilities. A Prussian aristocrat, Count Ernst Hans Christoph Roger Hermann Seherr-Thoss, White’s son in law since 1909, by his marriage to Margaret Muriel White (1880–1943), was also in attendance; along with the Italian Chargé d'affaires, as were other advocates of keeping the United States outside of any future conflict in Europe.

Over the next 25 years, newspaper accounts in the District of Columbia have captured how both Atherton and his wife moved prominently within social circles, by entertaining visiting European dignitaries, as well as having access to leading U.S. politicians and diplomatic alike. It is not known the political direction Atherton was advocating or shaping, however he had access to many influential members of society and the political elite. Since 1966, Harvard University has held an annual lecture related to ethical and social criticism in his honor, which indicates Atherton’s likely position at the time; his desire to improve educational standards and opportunities throughout the United States.

Atherton frequently attended Senate Committee Hearings. In 1918 he testified to Senator Asle Gronna in relation to the Government Control of the Meatpacking Industry. He represented a number of trusts that had shares in the industry. He was also in attendance at the Investigation of J.P. Morgan & Co. In the Harvard Class of 1886 Yearbook he described how the room was crowded when he arrived, however when J. P. Morgan Jr. (Harvard Class of 1889) was called forward to testify, Atherton took his chair.

Atherton, a prominent figure for 45 years, between 1891 and 1936, had direct access to senior political figures. He courted a number of U.S. Presidents with his agenda on advancement of educational opportunities. Often those meetings took place in informal settings or away from Washington, D.C. During a mid-season retreat to the New England coastline he was on the guest list for a function in honor of newly elected President Herbert Hoover. These and other such events were part of the social calendar.

Atherton did not make the 50th anniversary of the Harvard Class of 1886. His death came suddenly in 1936. His wife, Ellen Atherton continued with their shared passion for educational philanthropy, in his memory, and remained a prominent socialite at charitable galas and events, and was a patron of the National Symphony Orchestra.

== Personal life ==
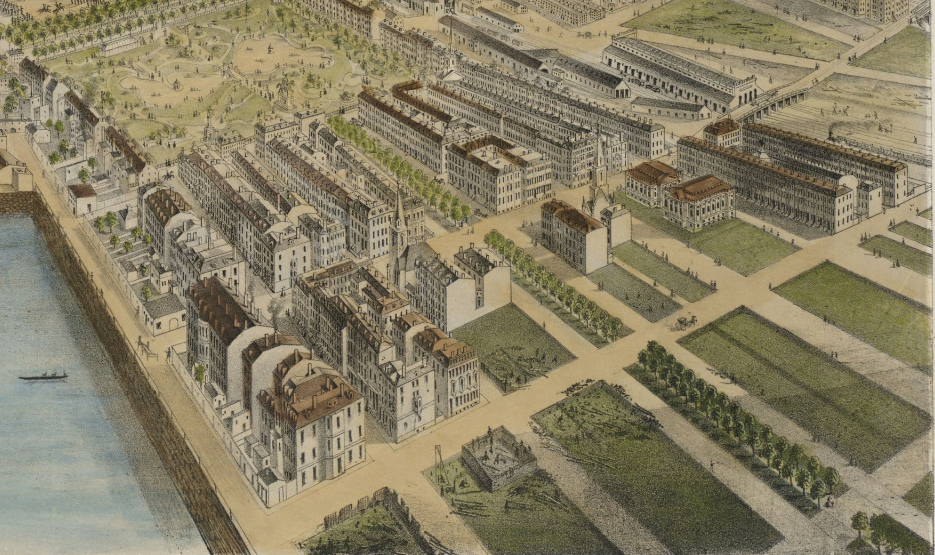
Back Bay under construction (1870) with the two sides of Commonwealth Avenue flanking the tree-lined Mall.

He grew up at 144 Warren Avenue in the Highlands area of Roxbury, Massachusetts. Although Roxbury was incorporated as a city in 1846, by the time Atherton was born, it had been annexed as part of Boston in 1868 and became known as the Boston Highlands. He was a Republican in politics.

Atherton had three siblings: Mary Louise Atherton (1863–1908); Percy Lee Atherton (1871–1944), who also graduated from Phillips Academy in 1882; and Edward Dwight Atherton (1868–1917), who studied at The Hill School, Pottstown, Pennsylvania. In 1880, Atherton moved with his parents to 144 Commonwealth Avenue, Boston, with his parents and siblings. His father had owned the assigned lot on which the home would eventually be located since 1872.

His elder sister, Mary Louise Atherton died in 1908. In 1909 he is listed in the Boston Blue Book as a member of the exclusive St. Botolph Club, located at 199 Commonwealth Avenue, Boston. He later joined the Metropolitan Club in Washington, D.C., as he diverted his focus to the capital of the nation.

He remained living in the Atherton family home whilst an eligible bachelor, however focused his energies into managing diverse trusts. A considerable amount of time and personal effort would have been expended by Atherton between 1904 and 1911 in order to make the Wentworth Institute a success. He is likely to have known his future wife as a young man (from his days at preparatory school), since she was the daughter of the headmaster, Frederic W. Tilton; albeit 7 years his junior. He eventually married Ellen “Maud” Tilton (1872–1965), at the age of 45, on April 8, 1911, at St. John’s Memorial Chapel in Cambridge, Massachusetts. The Tilton’s were at the time in mourning, following the death of the mother of the bride, and newspapers reported that no wedding reception ever took place.

Atherton, after the 25th anniversary of his Harvard Class of 1886, traveled as a newlywed with Ellen to Europe. A year later he moved with Ellen to Washington, D.C. He did not have any children.

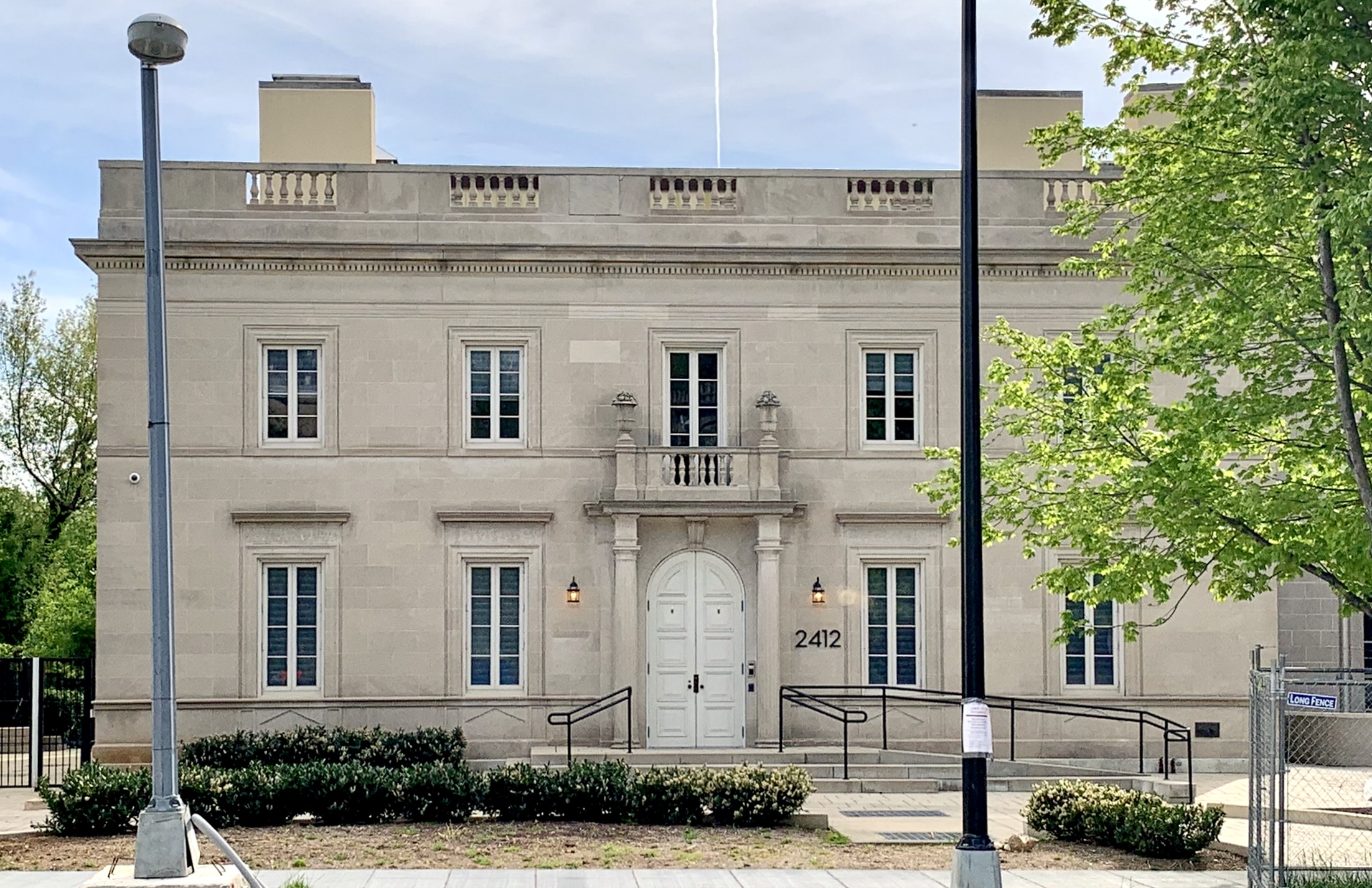
Atherton lived in this house at 2412 Massachusetts Avenue NW

Atherton’s first name switches interchangeably between Frederick and Frederic throughout his life. However, in later years it appears to settle as Frederick. Since this occurred after admittance to Harvard University and grew more frequent, once married, it may have been chosen to honor his father-in-law, Frederic W. Tilton, his teacher at preparatory school. Alternatively it may also have been his preference to evoke his refined European tastes. Whatever the reasoning behind this, it appears to likely have been a self-proclaimed decision or the elocution of his first name by either Ellen or himself; rather than a typographical error by a broad range of periodicals. Travel records across the Atlantic also refer to Ellen as Maud, thereby indicating that she routinely utilized her second name.

Atherton sold the Boston family home, 144 Commonwealth Avenue in 1924. His Boston neighbors had included John Jacob Rogers, Frederic Adrian Delano and Anson Phelps Stokes.

Atherton died on a heart attack at his home, 2412 Massachusetts Avenue in Washington, D.C., on April 5, 1936. He was 70 years old. His wife died on August 13, 1965, and was interred at Forest Hills Cemetery alongside him.

== Legacy ==
His former home in Washington, D.C., a Neo-Renaissance residence designed by Nathan C. Wyeth, was built in 1930; and in 1958 it became the Headquarters of the Sons of the American Revolution. It is currently the Embassy of the Ivory Coast.

Following the death of his wife in 1965, Harvard University has held an annual Frederick William Atherton lecture since 1966. Lectures have related to ethical and social criticism. The 1977 lecture was delivered by Lillian Hellman. Individuals who deliver the lecture must have notability; such as Russell Baker in 1974 and Jonathan Glover in 2002.

== Biography ==
- The National Cyclopaedia of American Biography. Volume 28. New York: James T. White & Co., 1940.

== Ancestry ==
Atherton was a New England descendant of Puritan heritage, whose ancestors had settled in Massachusetts Colony. He is a direct descendant of Major General Humphrey Atherton, via Consider Atherton and Ann Aniball. Consider fought in the King Philip's War.

His paternal grandfather, Samuel Atherton (1784–1877) and his great-grandfather, John Atherton (1747–1825), were both founding members of the Stoughton Musical Society.

His close relatives were Samuel Atherton and Walter Atherton. He was 1st cousin (once removed) of the diplomat, Ray Atherton, who became the first U.S. Ambassador to Canada.

His distant relatives include Hope Atherton, Arlon S. Atherton, Ralph L. Atherton and Adelbert S. Atherton.
