= Arlon S. Atherton =

American politician (1842-1922)

Arlon Sabin Atherton
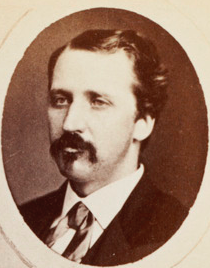

Member of the Massachusetts House of Representatives for the 1st Franklin District
- Incumbent
- Assumed office 1873

Member of the Massachusetts House of Representatives for the 1st Franklin District
- Incumbent
- Assumed office 1883

Personal details
- Born: April 4, 1842 Richmond, New Hampshire
- Died: December 6, 1922 (aged 80)
- Resting place: Warwick Cemetery, Franklin County, Massachusetts, Rt. 78
- Party: Republican
- Occupation: Merchant

Arlon Sabin Atherton (April 4, 1842 – December 6, 1922) was an American politician from Warwick, Massachusetts, who served in the Massachusetts House of Representatives after being elected to the 94th Massachusetts General Court in 1872. He was re-elected to the 104th Massachusetts General Court in 1882. He was a soldier in the American Civil War from New Hampshire, prior to being a state legislator for Massachusetts during the late 19th century.

== Early life and education ==
He was the son of Alvan Atherton and Mary Ann Stearns. His father was a farmer. He was born in Richmond, New Hampshire.

== Civil War ==
Atherton served in the 3rd New Hampshire Infantry Regiment, having mustered in as a private on August 21, 1861. He was involved in a total of fifteen engagements from November 1861 to early July 1864. Over this period he was promoted to the rank of corporal on June 21, 1862, followed by sergeant on September 15, 1863. Atherton re-enlisted and mustered in on February 11, 1864. He was appointed first sergeant on June 21, 1864, and second lieutenant on July 7, 1864. During 1864, his regiment suffered great loss in numbers. Atherton was sent to the front lines, and his regiment made significant advances, but he was severely wounded in the lung and captured by Confederate forces as his regiment retreated on August 16, 1864, during the Second Battle of Deep Bottom, in Virginia. As the wounded Federal soldiers were attended to by the Confederate forces, Atherton made a Masonic sign, and a nearby surgeon came to his aid and took him into his immediate care. The surgeon's quick thinking actions saved Atherton's life.

Shortly after, he was strong enough to be relocated with other wounded Federal soldiers to Libby Prison in Richmond, Virginia, a prison that was notorious for disease. However, Atherton was selected as part of a prisoner exchange the following month.

Atherton was paroled during September 1864 and sent to Annapolis, Maryland. He was appointed first lieutenant on November 9, 1864, followed by captain on May 15, 1865. He mustered out on July 20, 1865, and shortly after relocated to Warwick, Massachusetts, just over the state line from his birthplace of Richmond, New Hampshire.

== Personal ==
Atherton married Susan "Susie" Maria Caldwell on December 25, 1865, in Warwick. They had three children. He established a grocery business in his newly adopted home town.

He was a Mason and member of the Golden Rule Lodge, serving as master in 1892 and 1893.

In 1901, Atherton whilst residing in Wakefield, Massachusetts contributed to the Ellen M. Stone Ransom Fund, known now as the Miss Stone Affair.

He died on December 6, 1922, and is buried in Warwick Cemetery. His son Arlon E. Atherton, a former representative of the Boston Nail Company died a decade later.

His papers are preserved by the New Hampshire Historical Society.

== Ancestry ==
Atherton was a New England descendant of Puritan heritage, whose ancestors had settled in Massachusetts Bay Colony. He is a direct descendant of Major General Humphrey Atherton, via Watching Atherton and Elizabeth Rigbee. His relatives include Hope Atherton, Samuel Atherton, Ray Atherton, Adelbert S. Atherton, Percy Lee Atherton and Walter Atherton.

== See also ==
- 1873 Massachusetts legislature
- 1883 Massachusetts legislature
