= James Atherton (died 1879) =

American leather merchant (1819 - 1879)

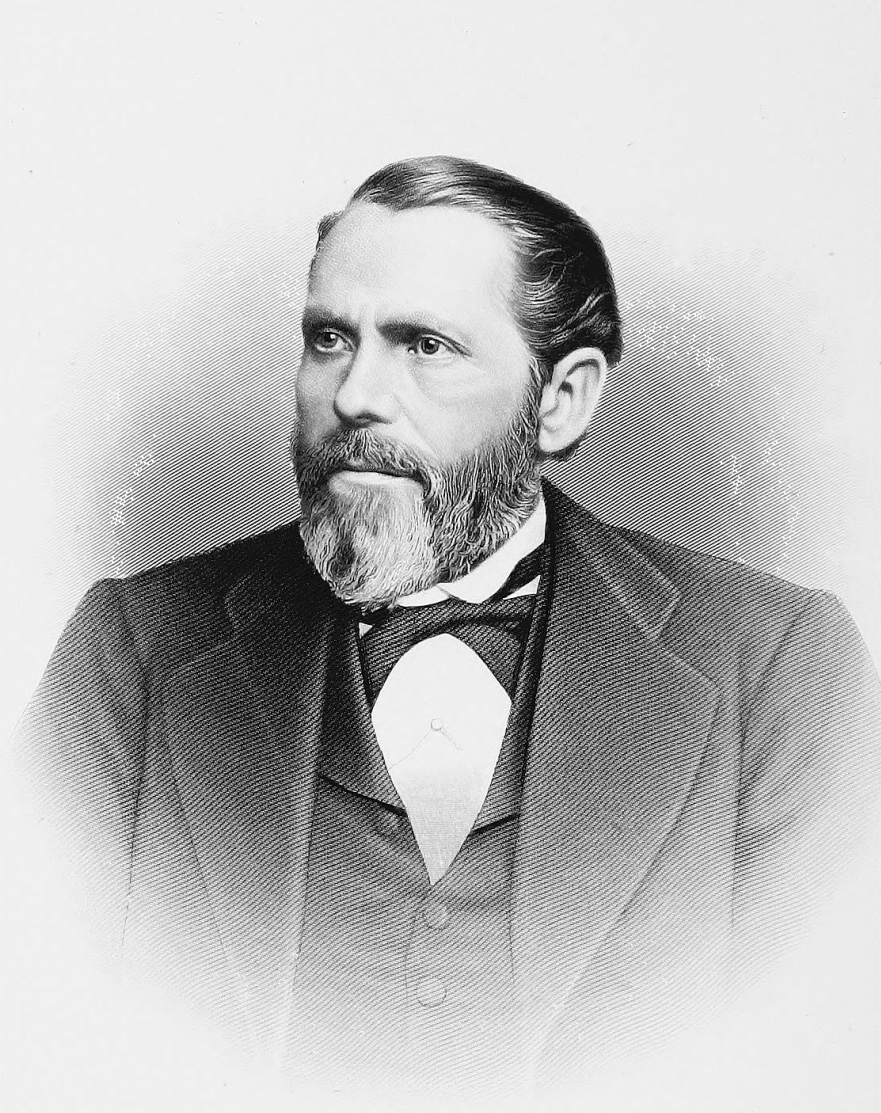
- Portrait of James Atherton
- Born: May 6, 1819; Stoughton, Massachusetts, US
- Died: March 4, 1879 (aged 59); Boston, Massachusetts, US
- Occupations: boot and shoe manufacturer and a leather merchant
- Spouses: Phebe Reed (m. 1831–1868) Mary Marshall (m. 1841–1880)

James Atherton (May 6, 1819 – March 4, 1879) was a Massachusetts businessman, a boot and shoe manufacturer, and a leather merchant.

== Early life ==
He was born on May 6, 1819. The son of Samuel Atherton (1784–1877) and Abigail Pope (1786–1868). His father was a farmer and a prominent citizen of Stoughton, Massachusetts.

Atherton is a direct descendant of Major General Humphrey Atherton.

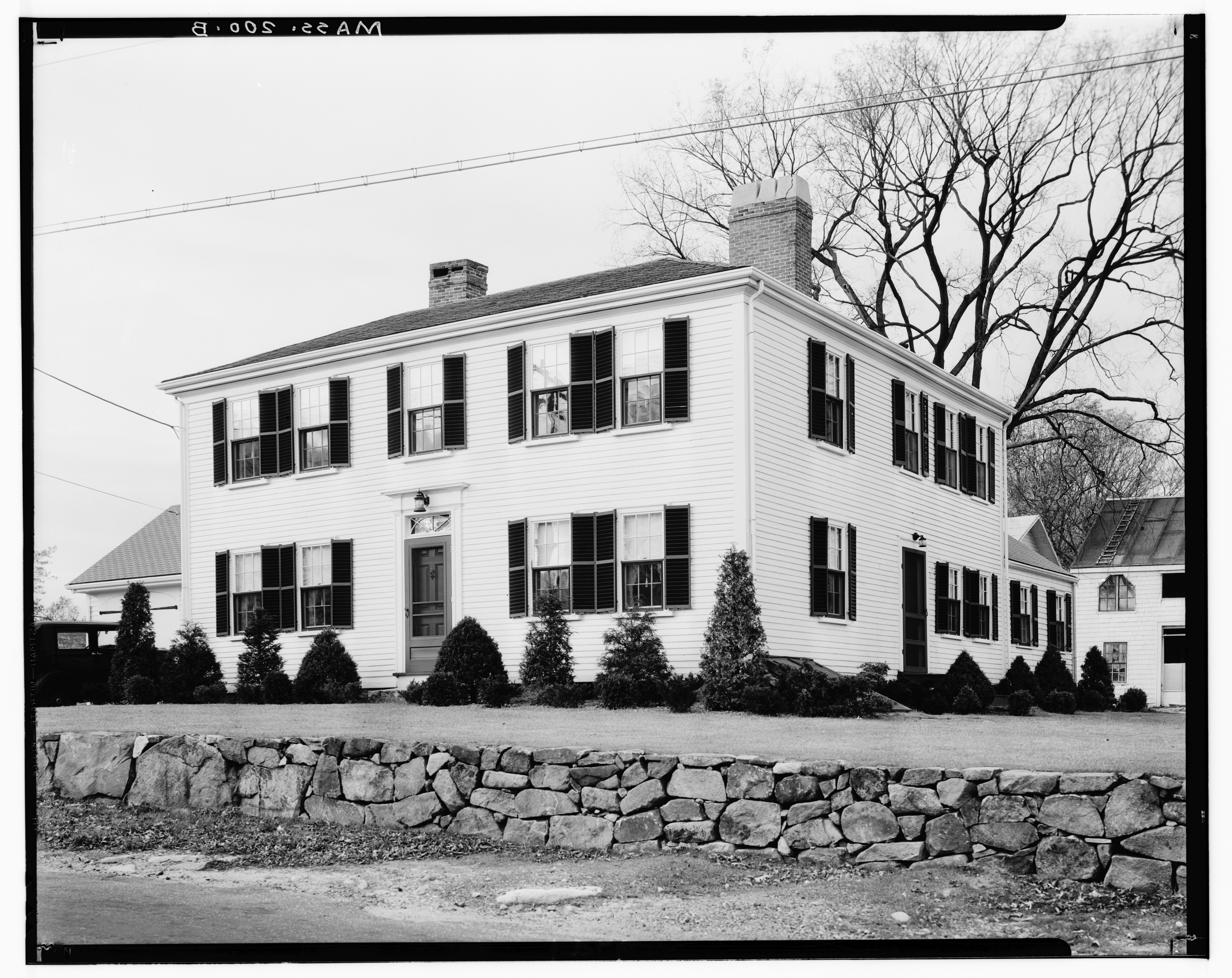
Samuel Atherton House, Stoughton, Massachusetts - The family home

== Career ==
Atherton established J&W Atherton, a boot and shoe manufacturer in Boston, in partnership with his younger brother William Atherton (1821–1891). In 1852 he entered into a partnership with his older brother Samuel Atherton and Caleb Stetson At the time, “Atherton, Stetson and Company”, dealers in leather, were one of Boston's most successful business. His brother, William, also entered into this partnership. Atherton suffered poor health most of his life and he retired from the business in 1867.

== Personal ==
He married Phebe Reed (1831–1868) and had 3 children who died at the age of 37 when her youngest son, Walter was just five years old. He then married Mary Marshall (1841–1880), just a year later.

His sons, James and William were both successful businessmen, involved in banking. His youngest son was the Boston architect, Walter Atherton.

He was uncle to the celebrated US Composer, Percy Lee Atherton and Massachusetts politician and philanthropist, Frederick Atherton.

He died on March 4, 1879, and was buried at Evergreen Cemetery, Stoughton, Massachusetts.

== Biography ==
- Hamilton Hurd, D. (1884), History of Norfolk County, Massachusetts, with Biographical Sketches of many of its Pioneers and Prominent Men, J. W. Lewis & Co, pp. 414–418
