= Adelbert S. Atherton =

American politician (1850–1920)

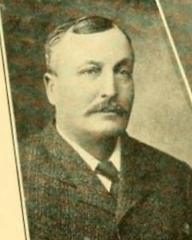

Member of the Massachusetts House of Representatives for the 2nd Franklin District
- In office 1904

Personal details
- Born: October 13, 1850 Chicopee, Massachusetts
- Died: December 14, 1920 (aged 70) Bernardston, Massachusetts
- Party: Democratic
- Occupation: Farmer, auctioneer, merchant

Adelbert S. Atherton (October 13, 1850 – December 14, 1920) was an American politician from Chicopee, Massachusetts, who served in the Massachusetts House of Representatives after being elected to the 125th Massachusetts General Court in 1903. Prior to being a state legislator for the second district, he was initially a farmer, then an auctioneer; and finally a merchant, and owner of a general store.

== Early life and education ==
He was the son of Samuel Hall Atherton and Abigail S. Taft. His father was a farmer.

Atherton was educated in public schools in Franklin County, Massachusetts and attended the Powers Institute.

== Career ==
His civic roles prior to being a state representative were as a moderator at town meetings, and then as selectman. Atherton was elected as a Democratic candidate at a state level. As an elected member of the Massachusetts House of Representatives, he was appointed to the committee on agriculture.

== Personal ==
Atherton married Milia H. Allen (1857–1936) on November 1, 1876, in Bernardston, Massachusetts. They had 5 children. He became a farmer, in the tradition of his forefathers. He was a trustee of the Powers Institute.

By 1919, he suffered economic troubles and filed for bankruptcy.

He died at the age of 70, in 1920 following a procedure at Farren hospital in Montague, Massachusetts.

== Ancestry ==
Atherton was a New England descendant of Puritan heritage, whose ancestors had settled in Massachusetts Bay Colony. He is a direct descendant of Major General Humphrey Atherton, via Hope Atherton and Sarah Hollister (1646–1691). His relatives include Samuel Atherton, Ray Atherton, Arlon S. Atherton, Percy Lee Atherton and Walter Atherton.

== See also ==
- 1904 Massachusetts legislature
