= Thomas Maule (Quaker) =

Thomas Maule (May 3, 1645 – July 2, 1724), was a prominent Quaker in colonial Salem, Massachusetts.

Maule was born in Berkswell Parish, Warwickshire, England. He originally emigrated to Barbados around 1658 and later relocated to Boston in 1668 before permanently settling in Salem about 1679. He remained in Salem until his death in 1724 at the age of 79. Maule was a tailor in Boston, and later expanded his business to general merchandising. He also dealt in construction and real estate while in Salem. It is unknown precisely when Maule converted to Quakerism, although it is suspected his conversion happened while he lived in Barbados. Maule's son Thomas was born in 1720 in Salem, apprenticed as a carpenter, and by 1744 relocated with his mother Sarah and her second husband Henry Clifton (m. 1733) to Philadelphia.

== Construction of the Quaker Meeting House in Salem ==
During the fall of 1688, Maule was instrumental in building the first known Quaker Meeting House in the United States. He supplied the building materials and land, which he deeded to leaders of the local Society of Friends. Much of the building was constructed using old timber reclaimed from other buildings. The restored Meeting House, reconstructed in 1865 with what is believed to be the building's original beams, is currently located at Peabody Essex Museum in Salem.

== Criticism of Puritanism and the Salem Witch Trials ==
After settling in Salem in 1668, Maule soon commenced with what would be decades of criticism lobbied toward the Puritan establishment in New England. One of his early criticisms was in 1669 when he made the accusation that Rev. John Higginson, the minister of Salem, "preached lies and instructing in the doctrine of devils." The judge ordered for Maule "to be whipped ten stripes well laid on."

In July 1682, he visited Great Island, New Hampshire, staying at the home of George Walton, a fellow Quaker. There, he was a witness to the Lithobolia, or stone-throwing devil.

At the time the Salem Witch Trials commenced, Maule believed in witches, and his wife Naomi testified against the woman who would become the first person executed during the trials, Bridget Bishop. However, he grew increasingly dissatisfied with the people of Salem and how the manner in which the trials were conducted.

In 1695, several years after the last of the accused were released from custody, Maule published a pamphlet titled Truth Held Forth and Maintained, in which he publicly criticized the Puritan leaders for their gross mismanagement of the Salem Witch Trials. He famously stated "[F]or it were better that one hundred Witches should live, than that one person be put to death for a Witch, which is not a Witch".

Among the points in the pamphlet was his allegation that God would adversely judge the prosecutors of the Salem Witch Trials. In response to this publication, on December 12, 1695, Maule was arrested on charges of slanderous publication about the manner of the untimely death of a prosecutor, Major General Humphrey Atherton, in the trial of Wenlock Christison, who was the last person to be sentenced to death in the Massachusetts Bay Colony for being a Quaker. Maule was also arrested for charges of blasphemy. He was imprisoned for twelve months and his pamphlets were ordered to be burnt. He was eventually tried in 1696 and acquitted of all charges after persuading a Puritan jury to disregard the Court's direction to convict. By granting Maule an acquittal, the jury showed it agreed with his principal argument: The court had no right to suppress his expression of religious belief. His acquittal is considered as one of the most pivotal events leading to the adoption of the First Amendment.

After the acquittal, Maule continued writing. Included in his writing are disclosures that he was imprisoned five times, whipped three times, and fined three times. His other known works include:

- 1697, New England persecutors mauled with their own weapons; giving some account of the bloody laws made at Boston against the King's subjects, a personal account of his trial in;
- 1703, For the service of truth against George Keith, which was a religious pamphlet, and;
- date unknown, Letter to Cotton Mather.

== Popular culture ==
In his novel The House of the Seven Gables, American author Nathaniel Hawthorne based the character of Matthew Maule in part on the real Thomas Maule, as well as others who were wrongfully accused, sentenced and/or executed for witchcraft. The character Colonel Pyncheon, the family elder, is obsessed with purchasing Matthew's property, which has a sweet-water spring. Matthew refuses to sell. Determined to own his neighbor's property, Pyncheon accuses Matthew of witchcraft, for which he is ultimately found guilty and sentenced to death by hanging. Maule's garden figures prominently in the novel.
