= Lucius Clapp Memorial =

- U.S. National Register of Historic Places
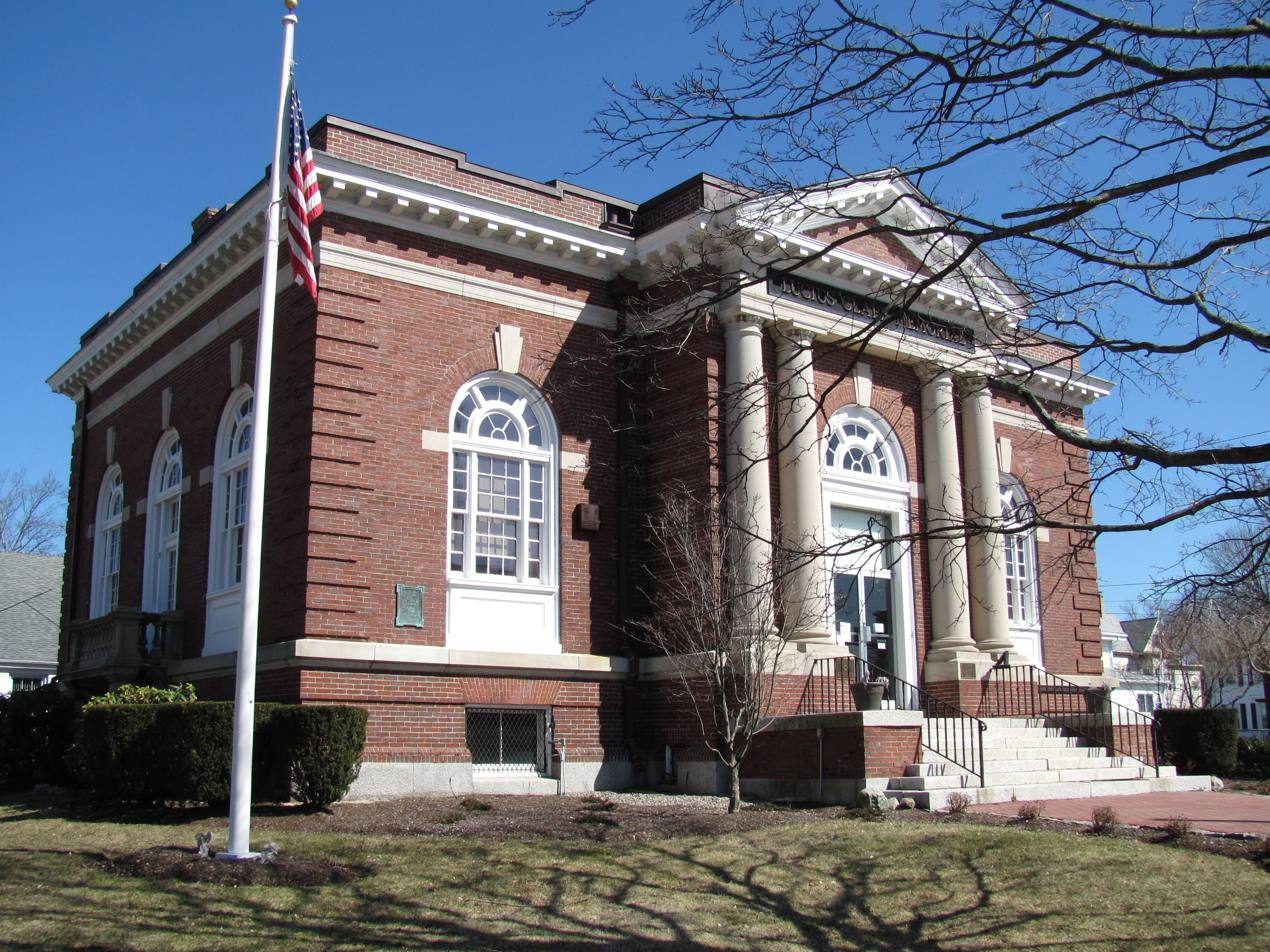
- Lucius Clapp Memorial

- Location within Massachusetts Location within the United States
- Location: 6 Park Street, Stoughton, Massachusetts
- Coordinates: 42°7′27″N 71°6′5″W
- Built: 1903
- Architect: Walter Atherton
- Architectural style: Colonial Revival
- NRHP reference No.: 92000998
- Added to NRHP: August 18, 1992

The Lucius Clapp Memorial is a historic library building in Stoughton, Massachusetts. The single story masonry Renaissance Revival structure was built in 1903. It was Stoughton's first purpose-built library building, and was built on the site of its first schoolhouse. The building was designed by Walter Atherton and given to the town by Lucius Clapp, a local schoolteacher and businessman. It now houses the Stoughton Historical Society.

The building was listed on the National Register of Historic Places in 1992.

== See also ==
- National Register of Historic Places listings in Norfolk County, Massachusetts
