= Wenlock Christison =

American politician

- Born: before 1660
- Died: c. 1679; Talbot County, Maryland
- Occupations: Missionary, Farmer
- Spouse(s): Mary unknown, Elizabeth Gary
- Children: Mary Dine, Elizabeth Christison John Christison

Wenlock Christison (before 1660 – c. 1679) was the last person to be sentenced to death in the Massachusetts Bay Colony for being a Quaker. Four people had previously been executed in Massachusetts for this reason. However, Christison was not executed. He left Massachusetts and lived the remainder of his life in Talbot County, Maryland.

== Persecution in Boston ==
Wenlock's origins are unknown. Historians sometimes reported his last name as Christopherson. He may have been of Scottish descent, and referred to himself as a British subject. The earliest record of him is from 1660 when he was held in jail in Boston along with other Quakers, including William Leddra. What the charges were against Christison at that time are unknown but most likely he was held for violating an ordinance that prohibited Quakers from being in Boston. Christison, along with Leddra and several other Quakers, was released from jail and banished from Massachusetts "under penalty of death should he return".

From Boston, Christison and Leddra went to Plymouth Colony, where they were robbed, whipped, imprisoned and eventually banished. By this time William Robinson and Marmaduke Stevenson, two Quakers who had been banished from Massachusetts, had returned and were executed on 27 October 1659. Mary Dyer was executed on 1 April 1660 under the same circumstances.

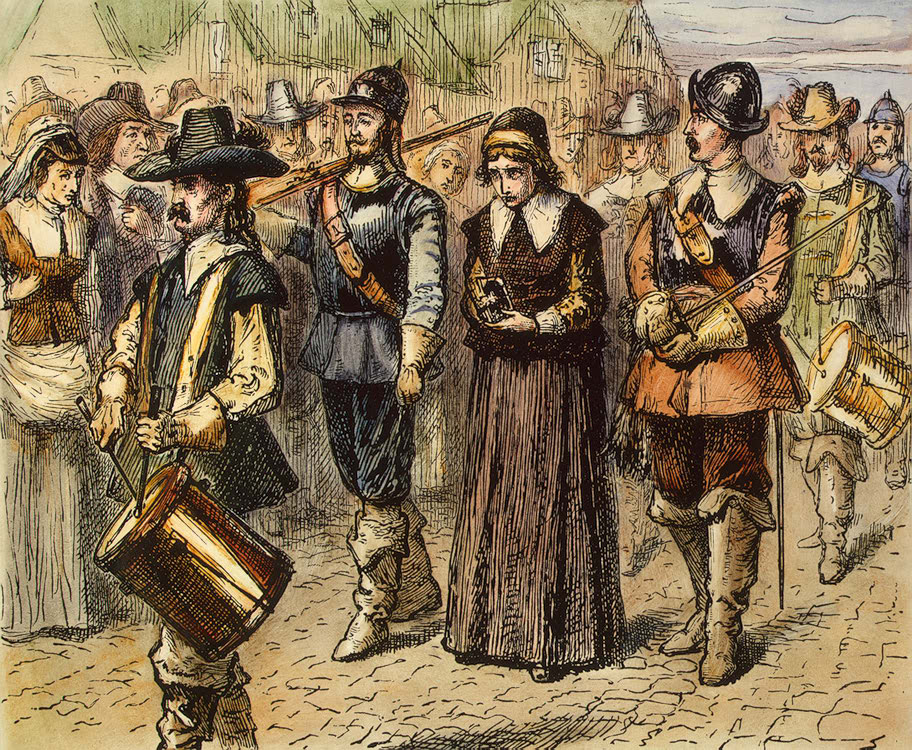
The Quaker "Mary Dyer led to execution on Boston Common, 1 June 1660. Sketch by unknown 19th century artist

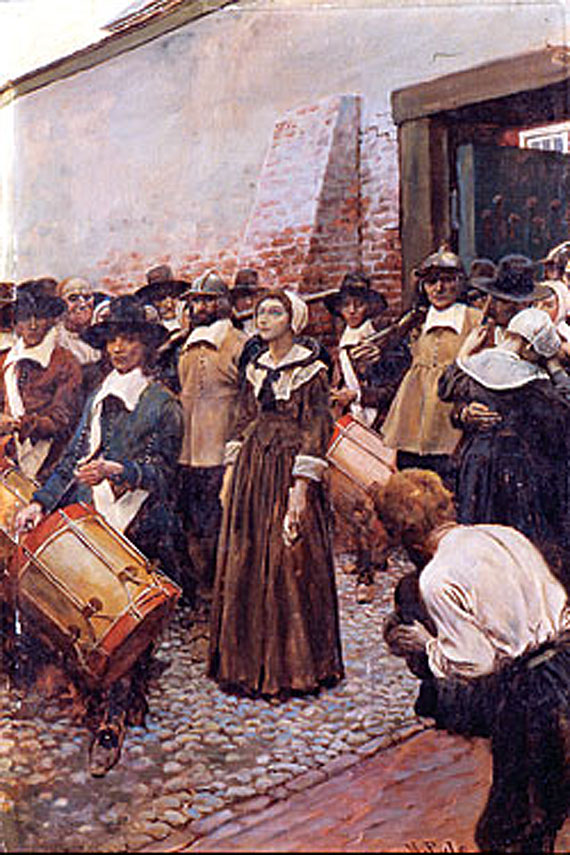
The Quaker "Mary Dyer being led to the gallows in Boston, 1 June 1660. Painted in 1905 by Howard Pyle (1853-1911)

Seeking martyrdom, Christison and Leddra also returned to Boston. Leddra was arrested in late 1660 or early in 1661 while visiting some friends in prison. He was tried and hanged in March, 1661. Christison was arrested while attending Leddra's trial. He was arraigned on 14 March 1661, the day that Leddra was executed. His trial took place on 3 April and Governor John Endicott sentenced him to be hanged on 13 June. The Quakers believed that during an altercation between the accused and Humphrey Atherton at the trial, Christison prophesied the outcome of his trial as well as the circumstances of Atherton's untimely death.

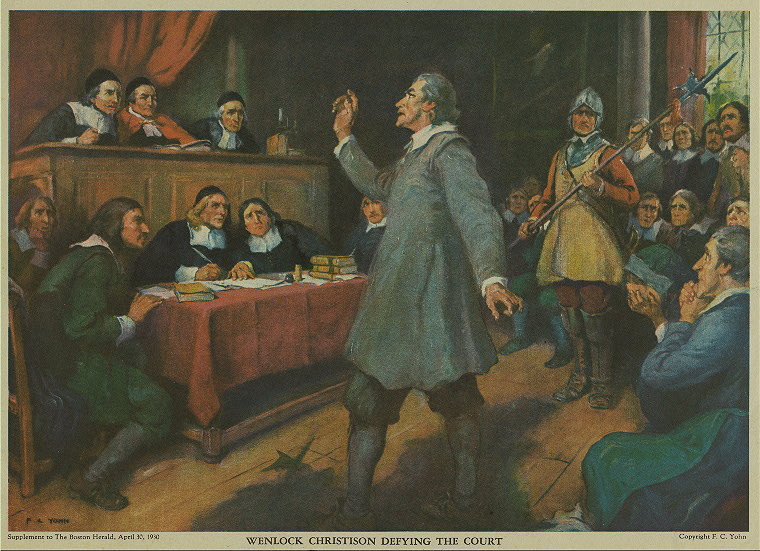

Quaker writer George Bishop wrote,

Yea, Wenlock Christison, though they did not put him to death, yet they sentenced him to die, so that their cruel purposes were nevertheless. I cannot forbear to mention what he spoke, being so prophetical, not only as to the judgment of God coming on Major-general Adderton, but as to their putting any more Quakers to death after they had passed sentence on him.

Henry Wadsworth Longfellow recreated the Christison trial in his play John Endicott which included the damnation of Atherton by the accused.

However, before the execution could take place, Charles II issued a royal mandate to the New England Colonies "granting full and free tolerance to all sects for the exercise of their religion and exempting Quakers from the punishment of death for any other offenses than those for which that penalty was adjudged by the laws of England." In addition, public distaste for the executions emerged. Christison was released from prison on 7 April 1661, after signing a written promise to leave Massachusetts and not to enter the colony again.

The royal mandate did end the executions but not the persecutions. Over the following two years the mandate was modified. "Accordingly, we find the persecutions were renewed, and Quakers were arrested, fined, imprisoned and banished as before, but no one suffered death after the hanging of William Leddra." Christison returned to Boston at least three more times. On 30 June 1664, Christison went to Boston from Salem, with Edward Wharton, to meet with two female Quakers, Mary Tomkins and Alice (Ambrose) Gary, who had arrived from Virginia, where they had been severely punished and banished. The four were arrested. Christison and the women were not harmed, but Wharton was severely beaten. Early in 1665, Christison, Mary Tomkins and Alice Gary were again arrested in Boston. This time they were sentenced to be publicly whipped in Boston, Roxbury and Dedham. After their release they took refuge in Rhode Island. Finally, in May 1665, Christison, Tomkins and Gary returned to Boston escorted by one of the King's commissioners, Sir Robert Carr, to board a ship for the West Indies.

== Later life ==
In 1670, Wenlock Christison settled down on a 150-acre (61 ha) farm in Talbot County, Maryland. The property, named "Ending of Controversy", was given to him by a wealthy Quaker physician, Peter Sharpe. Sharpe had married Judith Gary, the widow of John Gary. Judith's son, John, was married to Alice Ambrose, who had been arrested with Christison in Massachusetts. Another of Sharpes' stepchildren, Eliazbeth Gary, would become Christison's wife after her first husband, Robert Harwood, died. This was probably Christison's second marriage. He had children but it is not known how many. Christison acquired other property, including indentured servants and slaves. He was elected to the lower house of the Maryland General Assembly, mostly likely shortly before his death. He died about 1679.

Henry Wadsworth Longfellow recreated Christison's 1661 trial in John Endicott, one of three dramatic poems in a collection called New England Tragedies.
