= Ray Atherton =

American diplomat (1883–1960)

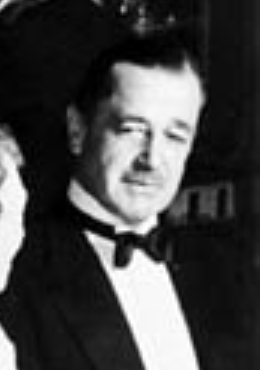
- Atherton in 1944

1st United States Ambassador to Canada
- In office November 19, 1943 – August 30, 1948
- President: Franklin D. Roosevelt; Harry S. Truman
- Preceded by: Himself (as Minister)
- Succeeded by: Laurence Steinhardt

United States Minister to Luxembourg
- In office September 10, 1943 – October 14, 1943 (Note: The Luxembourg government in exile moved to London, thereby terminating Atherton's appointment.)
- President: Franklin D. Roosevelt
- Preceded by: Jay Pierrepont Moffat
- Succeeded by: Rudolf E. Schoenfeld (acting)

8th United States Minister to Canada
- In office August 3, 1943 – November 19, 1943
- President: Franklin D. Roosevelt
- Preceded by: Jay Pierrepont Moffat
- Succeeded by: Himself (as Ambassador)

United States Minister to Denmark
- In office September 8, 1939 – April 9, 1940 (Note: Although Atherton would remain at his post until June 5, 1940, the German invasion of Denmark terminated Atherton's accreditation to the Danish government.)
- President: Franklin D. Roosevelt
- Preceded by: Alvin M. Owsley
- Succeeded by: R. Borden Reams (acting)

United States Minister to Bulgaria
- In office October 21, 1937 – July 5, 1939
- President: Franklin D. Roosevelt
- Preceded by: Frederick A. Sterling
- Succeeded by: George Howard Earle III

Personal details
- Born: March 28, 1883 Brookline, Massachusetts, U.S.
- Died: March 14, 1960 (aged 76) Washington, D.C., U.S.
- Resting place: Rock Creek Cemetery; Washington, D.C., U.S.
- Spouse(s): Constance Crowninshield Coolidge; Maude Hunnewell
- Education: Harvard College
- Profession: Diplomat

Ray Atherton (March 28, 1883 – March 14, 1960) was a career United States diplomat, who served as Ambassador to Greece, Bulgaria, and Denmark. He also served the role of Head of Mission as Envoy Extraordinary and Minister Plenipotentiary (Canada) (1943–48). Whilst in his last post, his role was reclassified and he became the first United States Ambassador to Canada. As Head of the State Department's Division of European Affairs he received notification from the German Embassy of their declaration of war on December 11, 1941.

== Early years ==
Ray Atherton was born in Brookline, Massachusetts, in 1883. He was the son of George Edward Atherton (1845-1905) and Isabelle Ray. His grandfather was Samuel Atherton, a Massachusetts businessman and politician.

== Education ==
He was educated at Harvard College, graduating with a B.A. in 1905. He went into banking for two years pending settlement of family finances after his father's death and then went to Paris to study architecture, becoming known as the "beau of the Beaux-Arts" at the École nationale supérieure des Beaux-Arts. He returned to the US in 1914 and went to work for an architectural firm in Chicago. By 1916 he was in London, when a friend, Walter Hines Page suggested he take the exams to enter into the foreign service.

== Diplomatic career ==
=== Diplomacy in the Far East ===
In 1917, Atherton joined the U.S. diplomatic service. His first assignment was a trip with the Rolland Morrow mission to Tokyo to buy ships from the Japanese to help transport troops to Europe. He remained in Tokyo until 1919, where he assisted with the evacuation of the Czech legation from Vladivostok during the Russian Revolution, followed by the Philippine Commission, subsequently returning to the United States Department of State in Washington, D.C. His next assignment took him to Peking (1919-1921), where he was a secretary of legation. He then went with the Forbes-Wood mission on a survey of the Philippines in 1921.

=== Diplomacy in Europe ===
At the end of the Greco-Turkish War (1919–1922), Atherton was posted to Athens and in 1923-24, served as ad interim United States Ambassador to Greece. It was a time of negotiation between Greece and Turkey to allow resettlement of refugees on both sides. The Greek mission ended suddenly when Washington decided the Embassy in London needed an expert on Far Eastern Affairs. It was to be a temporary assignment, however it lasted almost 14 years. He came there as First Secretary in 1924, later becoming Counselor from 1930 to 1937. He served under five Ambassadors. When Cordell Hull became United States Secretary of State in 1933, he was impressed by Atherton and came to rely on his judgment on European and Middle Eastern affairs.

There were two naval arms limitation conferences; one in 1930 and another in 1935-36 and Atherton was an adviser at both of them. The Japanese delegation was headed by Kichisaburō Nomura and Saburō Kurusu. A treaty was ratified, yet history proved it to be ineffective.

In 1937, President of the United States Franklin D. Roosevelt appointed Atherton Minister Plenipotentiary to Bulgaria. Atherton presented his credentials on October 21, 1937, and served there until July 5, 1939. The Sofia post was key to the eastern Balkans. The struggle for domination between the Germans and the Italians was at its height and Atherton witnessed the Italians being ousted and their ambitions frustrated because they lacked the industry to supply the Balkan needs. This was the start of Italian subservience to Germany. The Bulgarian appointment was terminated so that Atherton could chair the International Wheat Advisory Committee, attended by most European countries, Canada, the United States, Argentina and Australia. Atherton worked very closely with his Canadian counterparts, as conflict between the United Kingdom and Germany loomed closely on the horizon.

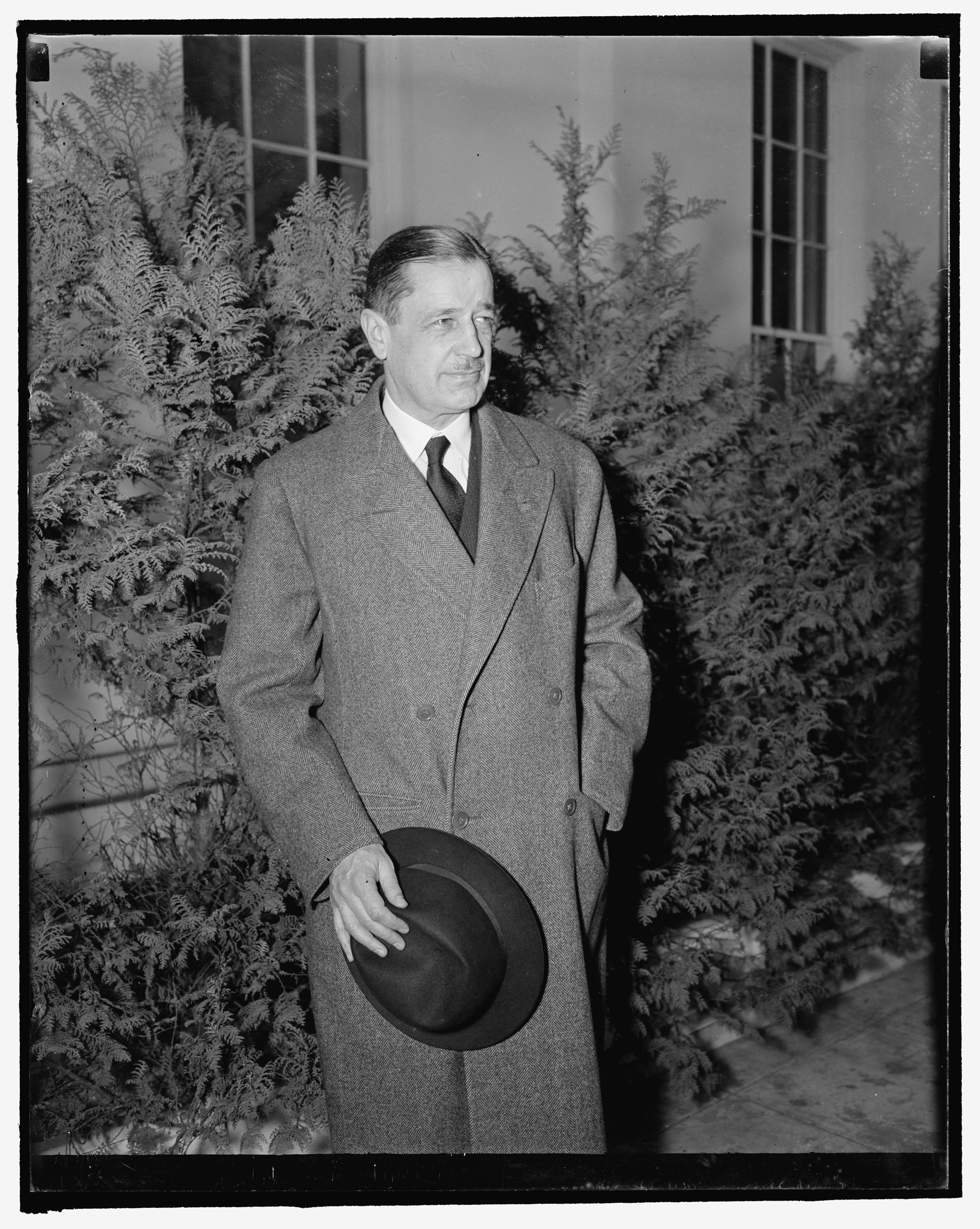
Ray Atherton visiting President Roosevelt at the White House

=== Diplomacy during the early years of World War II ===
Shortly after, Atherton was appointed Minister Plenipotentiary to Denmark, serving there from September 8, 1939, until June 5, 1940. As such, he was present in Denmark at the time of the German invasion of Denmark German forces occupied the city of Copenhagen on April 9, 1940.

Secretary of State Cordell Hull then recalled Atherton to Washington, D.C. Although he and his family had diplomatic safe conduct the overland journey home was far from uneventful. They arrived in Bordeaux just before the collapse of the French Government and German occupation. They sailed on the SS George Washington and with other passengers swung from the davits in lifeboats while the Captain argued with a U-boat commander who had stopped the American liner on the high seas.

Hull greeted Atherton upon his arrival with the news that he was to take the post of Head of the European Division, which had been vacated by Jay Pierrepont Moffat, who assumed the role of Minister to Canada. Atherton had now become one of Hull's closest advisers.

During his time in office as acting chief of the Division of European Affairs, Nevile Butler of the British Embassy would be a frequent caller in his attempts to bring the U.S. into the war.

=== The United States joins the Allied war effort ===
It was Atherton who, on the morning December 12, 1941, received Germany's official declaration of war delivered by German Charge d'Affaires Hans Thomsen after Hull refused to see him.

=== Diplomacy in Canada ===
In June 1943, the United States and Canada agreed to upgrade the state of their mutual diplomatic missions from legation to embassy. Atherton thus became the first United States Ambassador to Canada, presenting his credentials to Alexander Cambridge, 1st Earl of Athlone, the Governor General of Canada, on August 3, 1943, and serving until August 30, 1948.

Whilst in Canada, he was also accredited as minister to the government in exile of Denmark, which was established in Canada during the German occupation of Denmark. Atherton was also named U.S. minister to the government in exile of Luxembourg, which was also under German occupation.

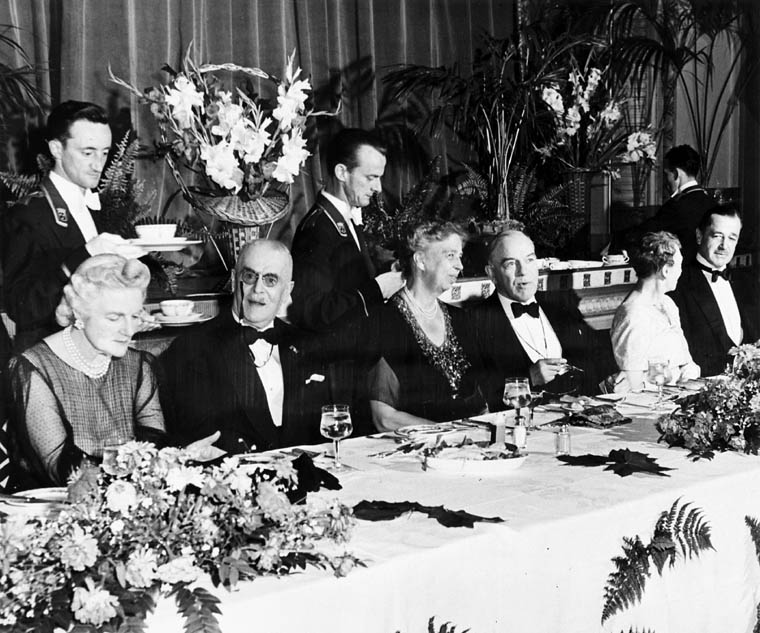
(L-R) Mrs. Clementine Churchill, Sir Eugene Fiset, Mrs. Eleanor Roosevelt, Rt. Hon. W.L. Mackenzie King, Lady Fiset, Hon. Ray Atherton in September 1944

The New York Times reported Atherton's farewell in Ottawa by members of the diplomatic legations. Noted absence reported in the press was his Soviet counterpart who declined to attend the farewell function, pleading pressure of business.

=== Diplomacy in the United Nations ===
In August 1948, Atherton was accredited as an alternate U.S. delegate to the United Nations General Assembly, which was then meeting in Paris.

== Career timeline ==
- 1917-1919 (Japan)
- 1919-1921 (China)
- 1921 (Philippines)
- 1922-1923 (State Department)
- 1923-1924 Chargé d'affaires ad interim (Greece)
- 1924-1937 First Secretary and then Counsellor and Chargé d'affaires (United Kingdom)
- 1937-1939 Envoy Extraordinary and Minister Plenipotentiary (Bulgaria)
- 1939-1940 Envoy Extraordinary and Minister Plenipotentiary (Denmark). Termination of Mission: German Note: Denmark was under Nazi occupation from April 9, 1940. Atherton left post on June 5, 1940
- 1940-1943 Head of the European Division, Washington DC
- 1943-1948 Envoy Extraordinary and Minister Plenipotentiary (Canada). Promoted to Ambassador on November 19, 1943. Accredited also to Denmark and Luxembourg; resident at Ottawa.

== Personal ==
His US domiciled address was Chicago, Illinois in 1923.

=== Marriage to Constance Coolidge ===
Atherton married an eighteen year old, Constance Crowninshield Coolidge (1892-1973), a Boston Brahmin, an American expatriate who had been living in Paris for two years. She was the niece of Frank Crowninshield, editor of Vanity Fair.

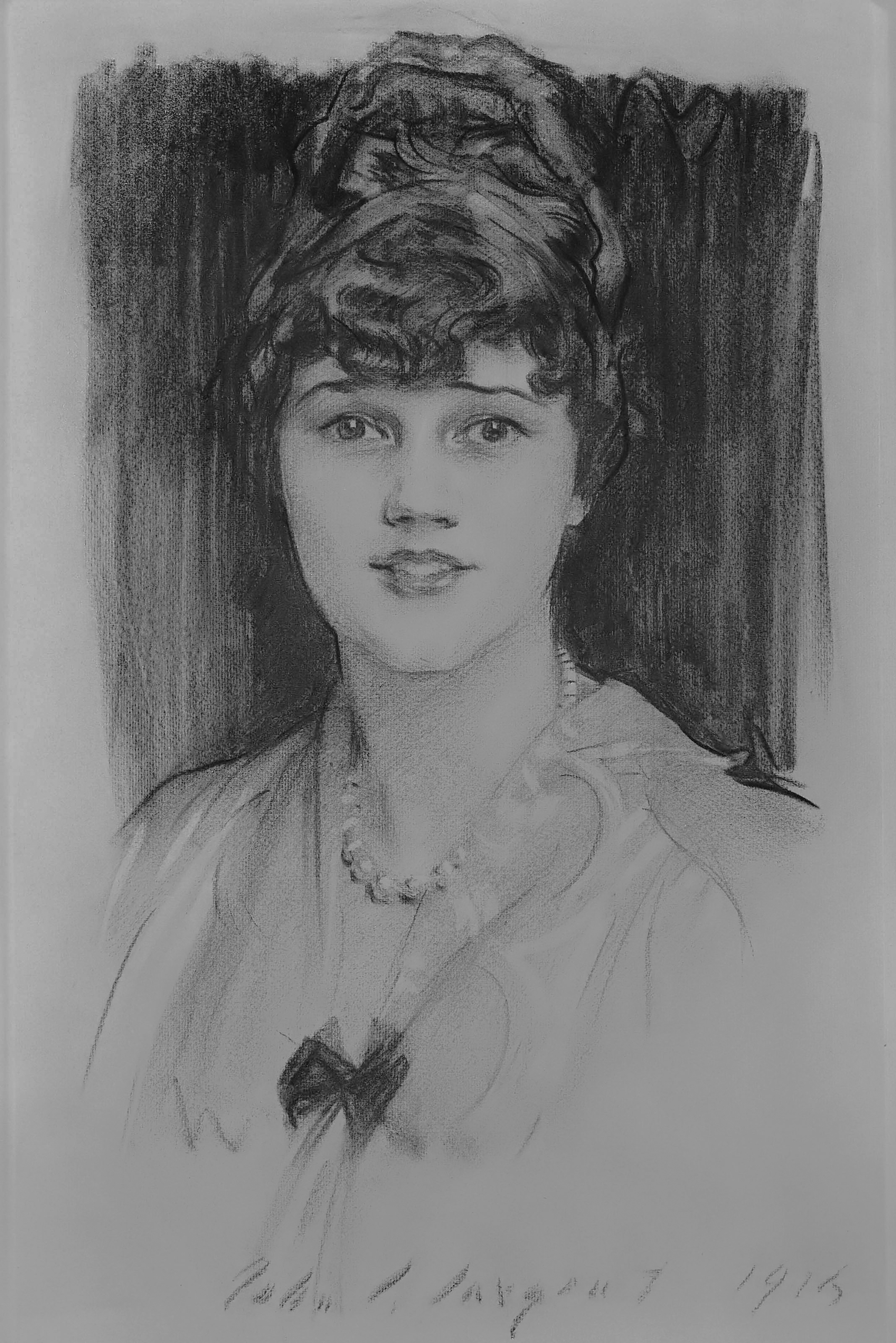
Constance Coolidge (1892-1973) by John Singer Sargent. Ray Atherton's first wife

Constance had the pedigree of the most elite Boston Brahmim; she was a descendant of the Adams, Amory, Coolidge, Copley, Crowninshield, and Peabody families.

Life in Peking during American Prohibition in the early 1920’a proved too tantalizing. Constance began an affair Eric Brenan, a British Diplomat, as well as with an American Expat, Felix Doubleday -while in still in China as the wife of diplomat Ray Atherton. Felix Doubleday was the adoptive son of Frank Nelson Doubleday. Love letters from both Eric and Felix have been preserved.

Constance had multiple admirers and received regular relationship advice from her financial guardian, Uncle Charles Francis Adams III (1866-1954), written on his ‘Secretary of the US Navy’ stationery.

Within diplomatic social circles, she was known as the “Queen of Pekin”. It was during this time that she became friends with Wallis Simpson.

Constance dresses were flamboyant and she spared little thought of what others might say about her. She loved anything risky; was addicted to horse racing, gambling and extramarital liaisons, which placed a great deal of a strain on their marriage. The marriage ended and Constance then lived an expat lifestyle in Paris, becoming intimately involved for a time with Harry Crosby, whose wife Caresse Crosby was the first recipient of a patent for the modern bra.

Constance remained at the center of social events and was friends with H.G. Wells, Ernest Hemingway and Wallis Simpson.

Following her divorce from Atherton, she got engaged to the reportedly handsomeformer polo player, Count Pierre de Jumilhac. They married in October and she became the Comtesse de Jumilhac. Whilst married to the Count, she became one of the most prominent racehorse owners in France, however the marriage did not last, and by 1929 they were divorced. Constance remained in Paris. During the abdication of Edward VIII in 1936, she invited Wallis Simpson to stay with her, and was a guest at their wedding. She was married twice more, and in 1934 met the writer H.G. Wells, twenty-five years her senior, with whom she conducted a passionate affair in the last decade of his life. By the time she was forty years of age, she had been married four times.

=== Marriage to Maude Jaffray Hunnewell ===
Maude Hunnewell (1894-1989) was the daughter of Hollis and Maud Somerville (Jaffray) Hunnewell. Her mother and father divorced in 1902 and her mother relocated to the UK and married John Stansbury Tooker of New York.

Maude had been living in London when she met Atherton. Both were from Boston. Maude was a keen golfer, and was the winner of the Surrey County championships of 1927 and a runner up in the French amateur championship. The New York Times reported on April 17, 1928, the engagement of a Boston Girl to an American Diplomat based in London. It also refers to her as the daughter of the late Hollis Horatio Hunnewell Jnr (1868-1922) of Boston, Massachusetts and Mrs John S. Tooker of Ascot, England. Atherton married Maude six months later.

As Mrs Maude Atherton, she continued to play golf with the British aristocracy at friendly tournaments, such as George Cholmondeley, 5th Marquess of Cholmondeley who was her partner in the mixed foursomes Exhibition Golf March at Leeds Castle.

=== Children of Ray and Maude Atherton ===
- Maud Isabel (Mia) Atherton (1929-1976) was born in London. She married Lt. William P. Wood in 1950
- John Humphrey (1931-2011) was born in London. US educated. He died in Paris.

== Death ==
Atherton died in Washington, D.C., of a cerebral hemorrhage on March 14, 1960. Both Atherton and Maud are buried at Rock Creek Cemetery in Washington, D.C.

== Family ==
His paternal grandfather, Samuel Atherton (1815-1895), is credited to having greatly improved the financial standing of the family, having established himself in business as a retail dealer in boots and shoes, first entering into partnership with Caleb Stetson, then admitting his two younger brothers, James (1819-1879) and William, as partners in 1852. Samuel was a director of the New England Bank, Prescott Insurance Company, Massachusetts Loan and Trust Company, President of the Dorchester Gas-Light Company, Director of the Central Massachusetts Railroad, as well as being connected with many other corporations. Samuel was a member of the Massachusetts State Legislature in 1867, 1870 and 1877. He was elected to the New England Historic Genealogical Society in 1870.

He was also a 1st cousin once removed of three other Harvard Alumni; Percy Lee Atherton, Walter Atherton and Frederick Atherton.

== Ancestry ==
Atherton is a direct descendant of Major General Humphrey Atherton.

== Notes ==
Diplomatic posts
Preceded by Frederick A. Sterling	United States Ambassador to Bulgaria; October 21, 1937 – July 5, 1939	Succeeded by George Howard Earle III
Preceded by Alvin M. Owsley	United States Ambassador to Denmark; September 8, 1939 – June 5, 1940	Succeeded by Monnett Bain Davis
Preceded by Jay Pierrepont Moffat	United States Ambassador to Canada; August 3, 1943 – August 30, 1948	Succeeded by Laurence Steinhardt
