= Walter Atherton (architect) =

American architect and draftsman (1863–1945)

Walter Atherton (1863–1945) was an architect and draftsman born in Stoughton, Massachusetts, United States. A Harvard alumnus, he also studied at the Massachusetts Institute of Technology in Cambridge and at the École nationale supérieure des Beaux-Arts in Paris for two years. He designed many schools, other public buildings and homes in New England, New York and New Jersey.

== Early life ==
Atherton was born into a prominent Boston family who descended from Major General Humphrey Atherton, an early settler of the Massachusetts Bay Colony.

His father, James Atherton (1819–1879), had been a partner since 1852 of Atherton, Stetson and Company, dealers in leather and one of Boston's most successful businesses at the time. A year later James married Phebe Reed (1831–1868), the daughter of John Reed of Boston. When Walter was 5 years old, his mother Phebe, died, aged 37, leaving behind a husband and three children between the ages of 5 and 14. Within a year, Atherton had a young stepmother aged 27; Mary B Marshall (1841–1880), the daughter of Thomas Marshall and Isabella McBey Marshall of Boston. His father’s health worsened and he retired in 1867.

Over a 12 month period (1879–1880) he lost both his father and his stepmother. His stepmother, Mary, shares her grave at Evergreen Cemetery in Stoughton with her husband and his first wife. During this time Atherton was enrolled at the Phillips Academy.

Walter Atherton was the youngest of three brothers. His older brothers James (1854–1947) and William (1859–1921) were both successful businessmen, involved in banking.

His paternal uncle, Samuel Atherton (1815–1895), is credited with having greatly improved the financial standing of the family, having established himself in business as a retail dealer in boots and shoes, first entering into partnership with Caleb Stetson, then admitting his two younger brothers, James (1819–1879) and William, as partners in 1852. Samuel was a director of the New England Bank, the Prescott Insurance Company, the Massachusetts Loan and Trust Company, and the Central Massachusetts Railroad, and president of the Dorchester Gas-Light Company, as well as being connected with many other corporations. Samuel was a member of the Massachusetts State Legislature in 1867, 1870 and 1877. He was elected to the New England Genealogical Society in 1870.

His paternal grandfather, Samuel Atherton (1784–1877), was a founding member of the Stoughton Musical Society.

== Education ==
Atherton received a preparatory education at Phillips Academy in Andover and completed his academic studies at Harvard University in architecture in 1885. He took a two-year course at the Massachusetts Institute of Technology. On completion he travelled to Europe with his cousin, the composer Percy Lee Atherton.

== Career ==
Atherton was initially employed by Carl Fehmer, owner of the architectural firm Fehmer & Page. He then moved to the practice of Herbert Dudley Hale, and in 1897 he competed under Herbert D. Hale for the design of the new armory in Providence, Rhode Island. Their competitors William R. Walker & Son's design was chosen to build the Cranston Street Armory.

He was responsible for the design of various types of building in Boston and surrounding areas. He was a member of the Boston Society of Architects from 1902 onwards. He also was responsible for the design of several school buildings on the Eastern Seaboard. In 1908, as an Associate Architect for Hale he was successful in competing for the design of the Pawtucket YMCA in Rhode Island.

He set up his own company, with the red brick Georgian Revival YMCA, at 207 Shurtleff Street being an early project. In 1909, The Harvard Graduates’ Magazine reported that he was responsible for the design of the new YMCA in Chelsea, Massachusetts.

He was an instructor in military mapping, Harvard University, S.A.T.C. during World War I.

In 1919, he was responsible for the design for the YMCA in Orange, New Jersey. During this time, Atherton ran an architectural practice out of 15 Exchange Place, Boston.

In 1922 he was awarded a contract to design the YMCA in Somerville, Massachusetts.

== Notable works ==
- Channing Church (now residential), 275 East Cottage St, South Boston, built 1900-1901
- The Lucius Clapp Memorial in Stoughton, Massachusetts, built in 1903
- The Pumpelly Studio in Dublin, New Hampshire, built in 1912
- The YMCA Building, Pawtucket, Rhode Island
- Church for the First Unitarian Society, Marfan St, East Boston

== Personal ==
He was a member of many clubs; including the Boston Architectural Club and the Harvard Club of New York.

In 1909 he is listed along with his brother William, under “Hotel Bristol” in Clark’s Boston Blue Book, also known as the Élite Private Address and Club Directory and Ladies' Visiting List and Shopping Guide.

He was a member of the Boston Society of Architects, the American Institute of Architects, the New York Society of Beaux Arts Architects.

He married his neighbor, Grace Helen (Hackett) Thorndike (1870–1967) at the age of 71 on April 7, 1934. Grace was a wealthy widow and the daughter of C. Hubbard Hackett, President of the Bank of the Metropolis in New York. Her late husband, Alden Augustus Thorndike, had inherited a large family trust; he being of direct descent to an early Massachusetts pioneer, John Thorndike). Atherton had been a bachelor all his life, whilst Grace had been a widow for 9 years. As Mrs Walter Atherton, Grace continued her patronage of the arts.

Atherton became stepfather to three of Grace’s adult daughters, through her marriage to Thorndike.

Atherton lived with Grace at 130 Commonwealth Avenue, Boston. This home was purchased originally by Grace’s first husband. The couple also maintained a home Highwood, in East Windsor, where they also entertained.

On December 30, 1944, Atherton and his wife were admitted to the congregation of the First Unitarian Church, Boston.

Atherton died on November 23, 1945, in Boston, aged 82. His obituary in The New York Times was published on November 25, 1945. His brother James was his only surviving sibling, dying just two years later. His wife, Grace H Atherton continued her philanthropy in his name donating many historical pieces of art to causes of historical interest. His wife died in 1967, aged 96, and is buried in Berkeley, California.

== Family ==
Atherton was the nephew of the successful merchant and Massachusetts Politician, Samuel Atherton.

Having lost both his parents during his early years, he came under the guardianship of his uncle William and his aunt Mary Edwards Atherton; the later whom he travelled with to Liverpool, England, prior to commencing his architectural studies in Paris.

He remained close with them, often traveling with his cousins, particularly Percy Lee Atherton.

He was appointed as a trustee to manage the estate of his late uncle, William Atherton (father of Percy Lee Atherton).

His cousin, Percy Lee Atherton, preceded him in death and left him $7,500 in his will in 1944.

He was cousin to Ray Atherton, a diplomat who served as the first U.S. Ambassador to Canada (1943–48). Ray Atherton had studied architecture in Paris between 1901 and 1903.

== Articles ==
- "Patch Passport: Travel Back in Time—The Stoughton Historical Society". The building was formerly Stoughton Library and was designed by Walter Atherton.
- Year Book of the Boston Architectural Club, Google Books
