= Samuel Atherton =

American politician

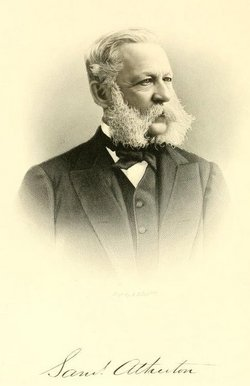

Member of the Massachusetts House of Representatives from the 5th Norfolk district
- In office 1870–1871

Member of the Massachusetts House of Representatives from the 5th Norfolk district
- In office January 5, 1870 – 1871
- Preceded by: William Taylor Adams

Member of the Massachusetts House of Representatives from the 5th Norfolk district
- In office 1867–1868

Personal details
- Born: January 26, 1815 Stoughton, Massachusetts, US
- Died: April 3, 1895 (aged 80) Cambridge, Massachusetts, US
- Party: Whig, Republican
- Spouse(s): Tempi H. Holbrook, m. September 16, 1841, died February 24, 1849; Susan B. Baker, m. July 3, 1856, died May 18, 1858; Susan M. (Bassett) Holton, m. October 6, 1869
- Children: 6
- Occupation: Boot and Shoe dealer & Leather Merchant

Samuel Atherton (January 26, 1815 – April 3, 1895) was a Massachusetts businessman who served as a member of the Massachusetts House of Representatives.

== Early life ==
He was born on January 26, 1815, the son of Samuel Atherton (1784-1877) and Abigail Pope (1786-1868). His mother was the granddaughter of Colonel Ralph Pope, aide-de-camp to Gen. George Washington. His father was a farmer and a prominent citizen of Stoughton, Massachusetts.

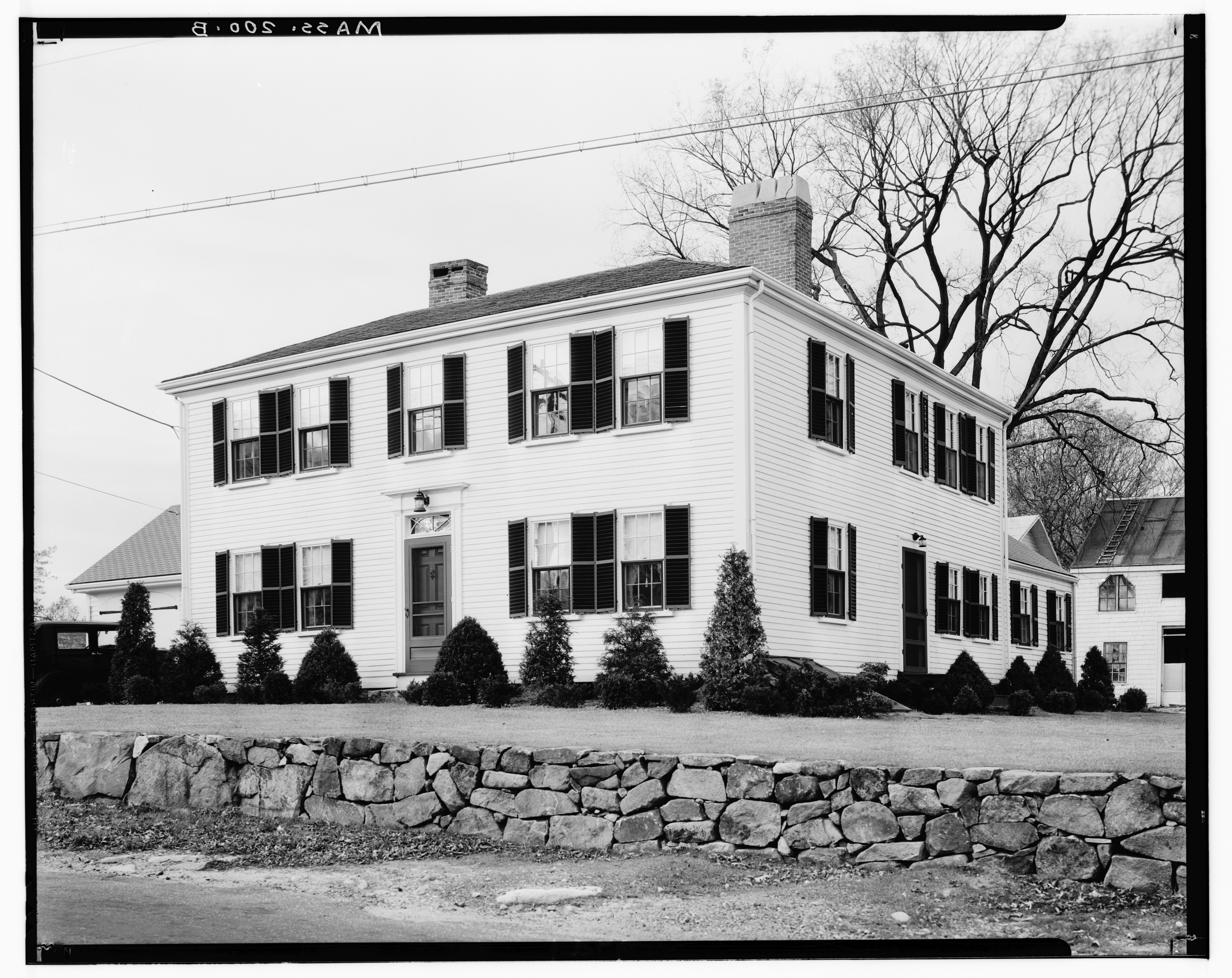
Samuel Atherton House, Stoughton, Massachusetts: the family home

He was an active member of the Stoughton Musical Society. His grandfather John Atherton had been a founding member and had hosted many musical events for the Society at his home. His grandmother was Mary Adams, the daughter of Jedidiah Adams, a relative of Samuel Adams.

== Career ==
He began as a clerk in a shoe store. Four years later her was employed by Caleb Stetson. He greatly improved the financial standing of the family, establishing himself as a retail dealer in boots and shoes, after entering into partnership with Stetson.

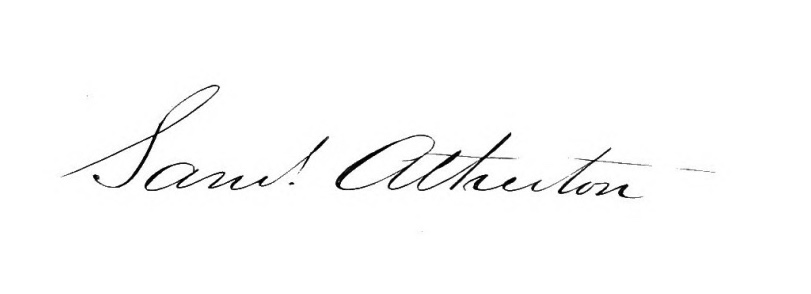
Signature of Samuel Atherton

By 1852 "Atherton, Stetson and Company", dealers in leather, were one of Boston's most successful business at the time. His two younger brothers, James Atherton (1819-1879) and William, became his partners that same year.

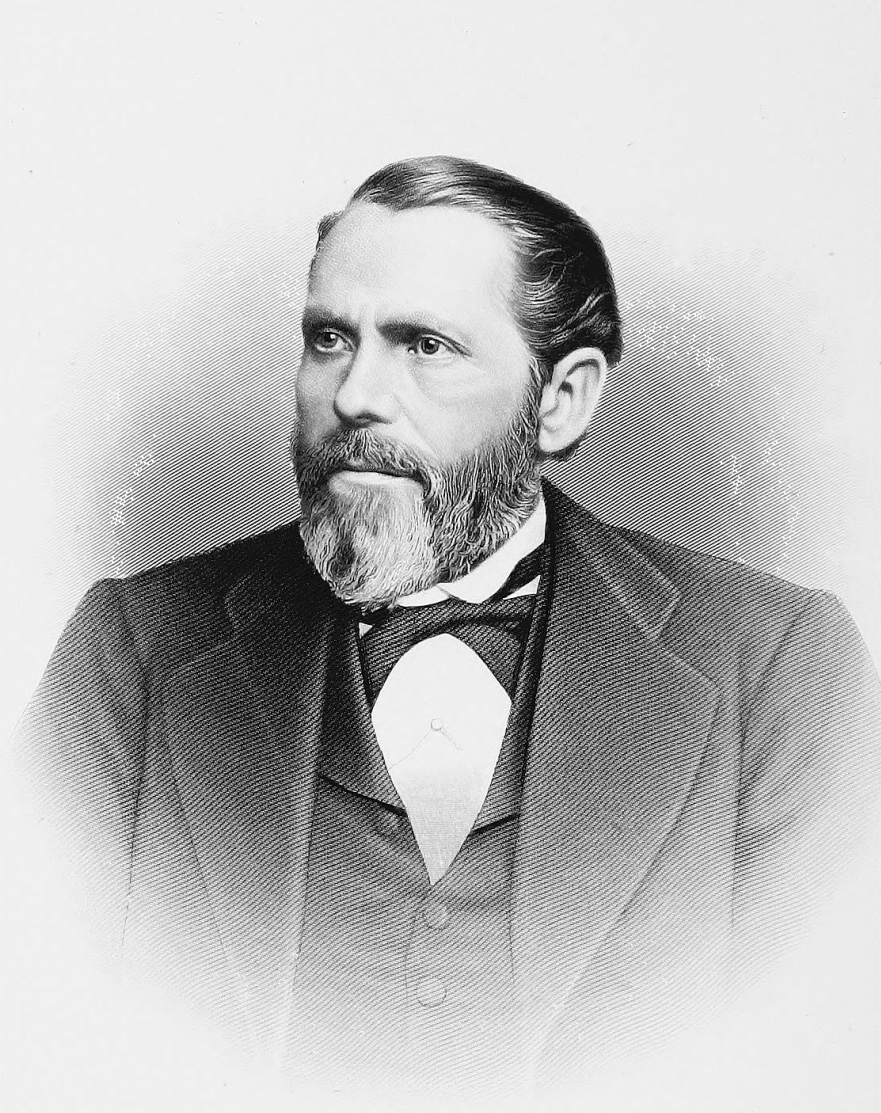
James Atherton (1819–1879)

== Other business interests ==
He was a director of the New England Bank, Prescott Insurance Company, Massachusetts Loan and Trust Company, President of the Dorchester Gas-Light Company, Director of the Central Massachusetts Railroad, as well as being connected with many other corporations.

== Political interest ==
He was a member of the Massachusetts State Legislature in 1867, 1870 and 1877, representing Dorchester.

== Personal ==
Atherton was widowed twice. His first wife was Temperance “Tempie” Holbrook (1820–1849) and they had four children. Temperance died of consumption at the age of 29 when her youngest daughter, Sarah was just five months old.

He subsequently married Susan Baker (1833–1858). She died two years later after giving birth to a child, named Susan, following the birth of Helen Louise “Nellie”.

He married his last wife on 1869; Susan M Bassett (1831–1907).

In 1890, Atherton was recorded as living in 121 Washington St, Boston.

== Family ==
He was the uncle of the celebrated US Composer, Percy Lee Atherton; politician, Frederick Atherton; and the architect, Walter Atherton.

He was grandfather to the US diplomat, Ray Atherton.

== Interest in genealogy ==
He was elected to the New England Historic Genealogical Society in 1870.

Atherton is a direct descendant of Major General Humphrey Atherton.

== Death ==
He died on April 3, 1895. He was buried at Mount Auburn Cemetery in Cambridge, Massachusetts.

== See also ==
- 1877 Massachusetts legislature
