= Percy Lee Atherton =

American composer (1871–1944)

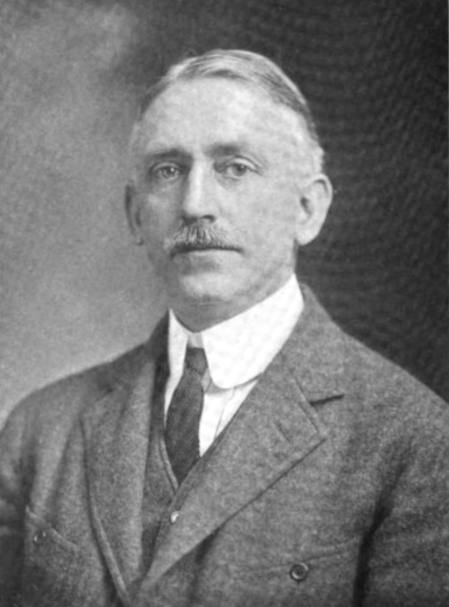
- Born: September 25, 1871; Boston, Massachusetts, US
- Died: March 8, 1944 (aged 72); Ventnor City, New Jersey, US
- Education: Boston Latin School; Phillips Academy; Harvard University
- Occupation: Composer

Signature
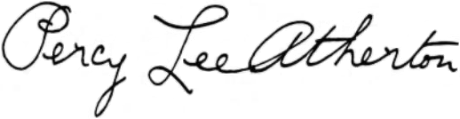

Percy Lee Atherton (September 25, 1871 – March 8, 1944) was an American composer and music teacher. His musical compositions include songs, chamber music, and several comic operas.

== Early life ==
Atherton was born into a prominent Boston, Massachusetts, family. His father, William Atherton (1821–1891) had been a partner since 1852 of "Atherton, Stetson and Company", dealers in leather and one of Boston's most successful business at the time. His father was also a vice president of the Home Savings Bank, and a director of the First National Bank of Boston which was founded in 1864.

His mother was Mary Edwards Dwight (1838–1915), the daughter of William R. Dwight And Mary Warren Fiske of Brooklyn, New York, and the great great granddaughter of Jonathan Edwards.

His paternal uncle, Samuel Atherton (1815–1895), is credited with having greatly improved the financial standing of the family, having established himself in business as a retail dealer in boots and shoes, first entering into partnership with Caleb Stetson, then admitting his two younger brothers, James (1819–1879) and William, as partners in 1852. Samuel was a director of the New England Bank, Prescott Insurance Company, Massachusetts Loan and Trust Company, President of the Dorchester Gas-Light Company, Director of the Central Massachusetts Railroad, as well as being connected with many other corporations. Samuel was a member of the Massachusetts State Legislature in 1867, 1870 and 1877. He was elected to the New England Genealogical Society in 1870.

His paternal grandfather was Samuel Atherton (1784–1877), who also had a good voice and ear for music, and was a founding member of the Stoughton Musical Society.

== Education ==
At Harvard, c. 1893

Atherton studied at the Boston Latin School and attended the Phillips Academy in Andover, Massachusetts, graduating in 1889. Music was his passion. He studied with John Knowles Paine.

Atherton entered Harvard University, graduating in 1893 with honors in music.

== Musical studies and travels in Europe ==
Atherton's father had died just two years prior to his graduation and his widowed mother made arrangements for a cultural trip to Europe following his graduation. Atherton first traveled to England in 1895 with his architect cousin, Walter Atherton. He returned with his mother and brother, sailing from New York, this time to Liverpool in 1898, prior to onward travel to France and Germany for his musical studies.

He studied musical theory and composition in Europe; initially at the Bavarian Music School (Königliche bayerische Musikschule), (now known as the University of Music and Performing Arts Munich), along with the Munich Conservatory for 2 years, under the guidance of German organist and composer Josef Rheinberger, and the Austrian composer and teacher Ludwig Thuille. He then studied under the American (German based) Otis Bardwell Boise in Berlin in 1896; then in 1900 he studied with the Italian composer Giovanni Sgambati in Rome; and finally with the French organist Charles Marie Widor in Paris.

== Musical career ==
Upon his return from Europe, he was involved with the New England Conservatory of Music, as well as Symphony Hall, Boston. He was also a member of the Harvard Musical Association.

Atherton composed several comic operas, including The Heir Apparent (1890) and The Maharaja (1900), an Oriental opera comique. In addition, he wrote dozens of songs and a number of pieces for violin and piano, romances, folk songs, waltzes and numerous works of chamber music, pianoforte pieces and many songs, and a number of violin and piano pieces; all which entered public domain in 2015. A selection of works are listed below:

== Vocal composition list ==
- A memory, words by Leslie Salmon
- Cradle song, op. 20 (4 songs) no. 2, words by Thomas Bailey Aldrich)
- If I but look within thine eyes, op. 15 no. 1, words by Heinrich Heine)

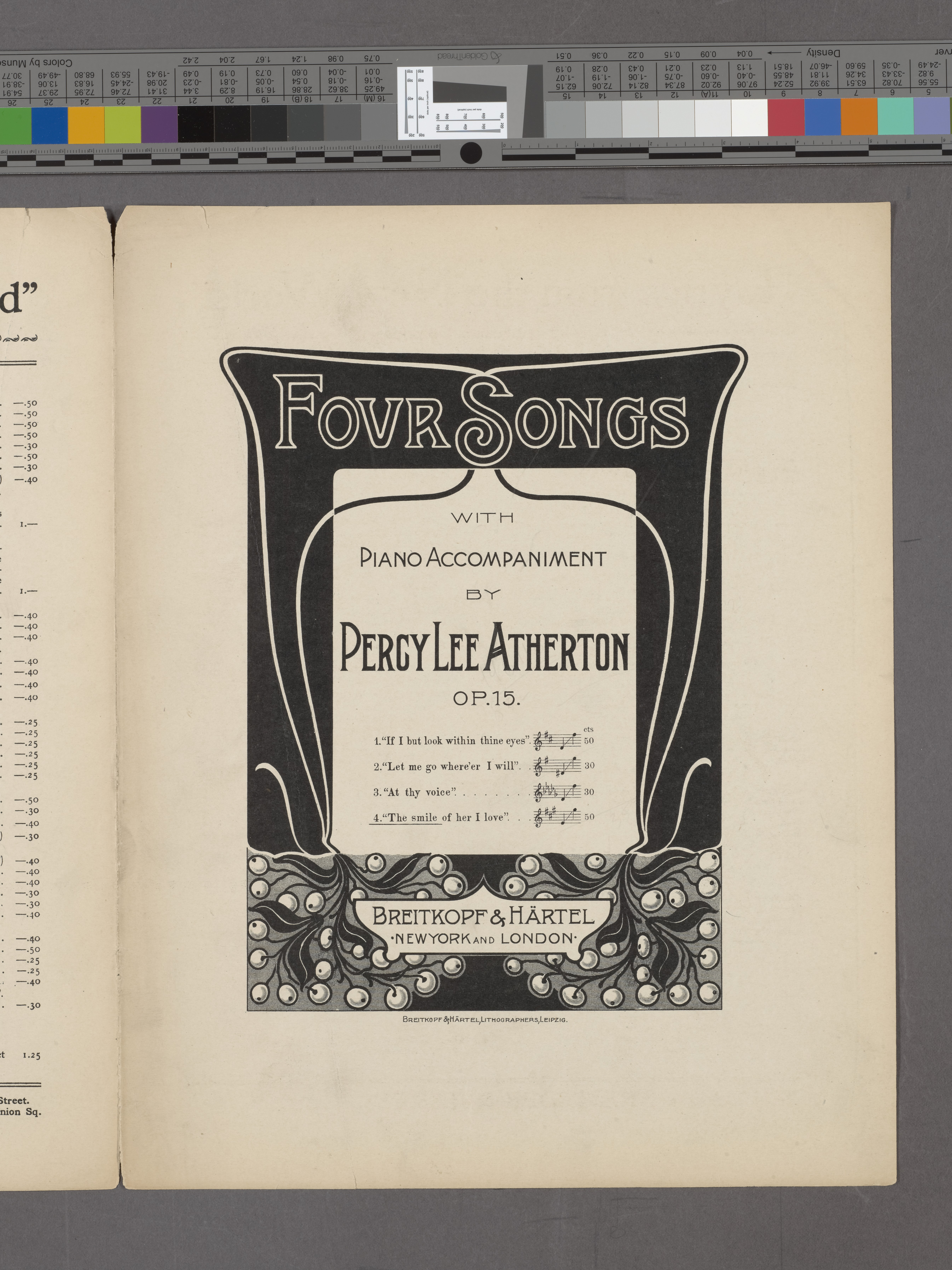
Music by Percy Lee Atherton

- Like a Queen, op. 16, two poems by Sir William Watson)
- Rondel, words by Algernon Charles Swinburne)
- Stars of the summer night, op. 20 (4 songs) no. 3, words by Henry Wadsworth Longfellow)
- Thy soft blue eyes beloved, op. 30 (3 songs) no. 1, words by Heinrich Heine)
- When birds were songless on the bough, op. 16, two poems by Sir William Watson) no. 2
- With rue my heart is laden, words by Alfred Edward Housman)
- A Christmas folk song, op.36, No. 3, words by Lizette Woodsworth Reese

Many of his songs were sung at musicals by leading artists.

== Philanthropy and preservation of musical heritage ==
Atherton was very much a patron on the arts and a public figure as a celebrated Boston composer. During August 1918 he worked with Louis Kronberg, a Boston artist on a Greek Harvest Festival, in honor of Demeter in a natural amphitheater in Gloucester, Massachusetts.

In addition to creating his own compositions, he appreciated the preservation of musical heritage, and being a philanthropist, he became focused on music manuscript preservation at a national level, becoming highly involved with the performing arts reading room at the Library of Congress in Washington, D.C., from 1921. In 1934 the Harvard Musical Association records him as living in Washington. This position afforded him access to people of influence and was respected by his close friend from his Boston days, the French born American Carl Engel, who for a time was the Head the Library of Congress Music Division.

Atherton served as the interim head of the music division of the Library of Congress of the United States (1929 to 1942), which had been established in 1896 within the Thomas Jefferson Building in 1897. During his tenure thousands of music and literary manuscripts had been deposited in the Library's collection; through both donations and purchases. Particularly influential was Elizabeth Sprague Coolidge and Gertrude Clarke Whittall, who donated many highly collectible musical instruments during the 1930s. Both women had the financial resources, social standing, and commitment to greatly expand the library's footprint; as well as help preserve musical heritage for the enjoyment of future generations.

== Personal life ==
Atherton grew up at 144 Warren Avenue in the Highlands area of Roxbury, Massachusetts. Although Roxbury was incorporated as a city in 1846, by the time Atherton was born, it had been annexed as part of Boston in 1868 and became known as the Boston Highlands. He was independent in politics.

Atherton had three siblings: Mary Louise Atherton (1863–1908); Frederick Atherton (1865–1936), who also graduated from Phillips Academy in 1882 and Harvard in 1886; and Edward Dwight Atherton, who studied at The Hill School, Pottstown, Pennsylvania.

His brother Frederick was a trustee for the Atherton family's interests and also was one of three trustees named to administer the portion of the estate of Arioch Wentworth left to found the Wentworth Institute of Technology in 1904.

Atherton remained unmarried all his life, and lived most of his life at the Atherton family home at 144 Commonwealth Avenue, Boston, after moving there with his parents in 1880, and remained there until 1921 – six years after his mother's death.

In 1909 he is listed in the Boston Blue Book as a member of the exclusive St. Botolph Club, at 199 Commonwealth Avenue, Boston. He was also a member of a variety of other clubs including; the Audubon Society, the Longwood Cricket Club, the Composers Club of Boston, the Harvard Musical Association, the Harvard Musical Club and the Harvard Club of Boston and Harvard Club of New York. He was also a trustee at Boston Library.

His cousin was Florence Atherton Spalding, the daughter of George Faxon, Director of the Boston Handel and Haydn Society; and a fine tenor singer, using the stage name "Florence Atherton". She was also a descendant of Major General Humphrey Atherton. Florence was a Boston music teacher and composer who married George Frederick Spalding of Newton, Massachusetts in 1885. Their son, John Varnum Spalding, was an associate justice of the Massachusetts Supreme Judicial Court from 1944 to 1971.

He was a friend with the author Henry Gilbert and the correspondence exchange has been preserved by Yale as part of the Henry Gilbert Collection. He composed music to the poems of the author Charlotte Perkins Gilman, with their correspondence being preserved within the Schlesinger Collection of Harvard University.

Atherton died suddenly of a heart attack at his home in Ventnor City, New Jersey, aged 72, on March 8, 1944. However he was buried in Massachusetts.

== Legacy ==
Among his bequests in his will was $15,000 as a Harvard Scholarship Fund for students with musical talent; $1000 to the music division of the Library of Congress; $1000 to Barney Neighborhood House in Wheat Row, $500 to the Harvard Music Association and $500 each to the North End and South End Schools in Boston. Atherton was also a 1st cousin once removed of the former US diplomat and Harvard alumnus Ray Atherton. and Walter Atherton, to whom he bequeathed $7,500 in his will.

William C. Heilman was nominated in his will to select and publish any music manuscripts "in favor of the estate".

== Ancestry ==
Atherton is a direct descendant of Major General Humphrey Atherton.
