= Caleb Stetson =

American politician (1801–1885)

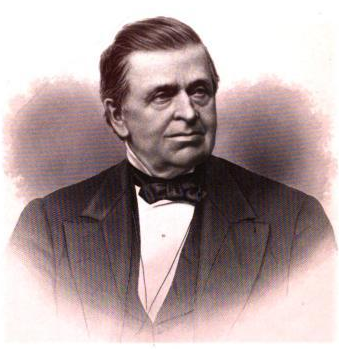

Member of the Massachusetts House of Representatives from the Norfolk district
- In office 1853

Personal details
- Born: January 6, 1801 Braintree, Massachusetts
- Died: January 1885 (aged 83–84)
- Party: Democratic
- Spouse: Susannah Hunt
- Children: Albert Everett Stetson
- Occupation: Shoe Manufacturer

Caleb Stetson (January 6, 1801 – January 1885) was an American businessman and politician from the Commonwealth of Massachusetts. A Democrat, in 1852 he was elected to serve in the Massachusetts House of Representatives. In the legislature he chaired the House Committee on Banking. He was a member of the Massachusetts Constitutional Convention of 1853. He was also an early promoter and president of the South Shore Railroad. He lost property in the Great Boston Fire.

== Bibliography ==
- Annual Obituary Notices of Eminent Persons who Have Died in the United States p. 346 By Nathan Crosby (1858).
- History of Norfolk County, Massachusetts: With Biographical Sketches of Many of Its Pioneers and Prominent Men Vol I. By Duane Hamilton Hurd pp. 131–132. (1884).
- Journal of the Constitutional Convention of the Commonwealth of Massachusetts: Begun and Held in Boston, on the Fourth Day of May, 1853 By Massachusetts Constitutional Convention p. 53, 191(1853).
