= Humphrey Atherton =

Military leader in Colonial America

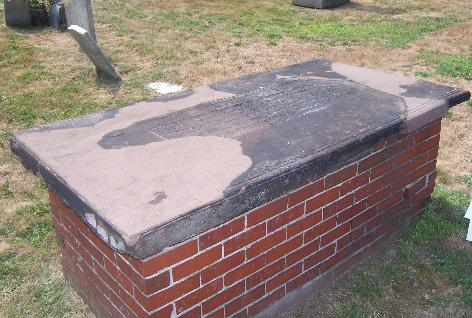
- Tomb of Major-General Humphrey Atherton at Dorchester North Burying Ground, Boston, Mass. August 8, 2010
- Born: c. 1607; Possibly Lancashire, England
- Died: September 16, 1661 Boston, Massachusetts
- Branch: Militia
- Rank: Major-General
- Commands: Ancient and Honorable Artillery Company of Massachusetts (militia) Suffolk Regiment (militia)

Major-General Humphrey Atherton (c. 1607 – September 16, 1661), an early settler of Dorchester, Massachusetts, held the highest military rank in colonial New England. He first appeared in the records of Dorchester on March 18, 1637 and made freeman May 2, 1638. He became a representative in the General Court in 1638 and 1639–41. In 1653, he was Speaker of the House, representing Springfield, Massachusetts. He was chosen assistant governor, a member of the lower house of the General Court who also served as magistrate in the judiciary of colonial government, in 1654, and remained as such until his death." He was a member of the Ancient and Honorable Artillery Company of Massachusetts and held the ranks of lieutenant and captain for several years before rising to the rank of major-general. He also organized the first militia in Massachusetts.

It is unclear where and when Atherton was born. It is presumed he came from Lancashire, England. He was active in the governance of the colony, taking part in the acquisition of Native American lands, the persecution of Quakers, and the apprehension and convictions of heretics. His accidental death was seen by the Quakers as a punishment from God for his persecution of them, an idea repeated in a play by Henry Wadsworth Longfellow. He was one of the most successful land speculators in the New England colonies. He and his wife, Mary, had a number of children and several New England families have traced their ancestry to them. He is interred at Dorchester North Burying Ground, one of the oldest cemeteries in New England.

== Origin and emigration ==
Coat of Arms of Humphrey Atherton

Humphrey Atherton's date and place of birth are uncertain. It has been presumed by some that he was born in Lancashire, England, because the name Atherton is prominent there. However, genealogist Robert Charles Anderson, in The Great Migration, states that this "does not come close to constituting proof of origin." The date of 1608 is sometimes given as his date of birth because Edmund Atherton of Wigan Lancashire, England died in 1612 leaving, as his heir, a four-year-old son named Humphrey. However, Duane Hamilton Hurd, in History of Norfolk County, Massachusetts stated that Atherton was 36 years old when he died in 1661. On the other hand, Charles Samuel Hall in Hall Ancestry, pointed out that when Atherton was made freeman and was granted property in 1638, "he must at that time reached his majority."

Charles H. Atherton said that Humphrey Atherton, his wife and three young children arrived at the colony in the ship James, August 7, 1635, but there is no record of this. He further said that Atherton and his wife were each about 15 years old when they were married.

There is a record of Nathaniel Wales having voyaged on the James. Wales referred to Humphrey Atherton as his "brother-in-law" in his will, so it has been assumed that Atherton's wife, Mary, was Wales' sister. However, the term may have been used because Atherton's daughter, Isabel, was married to Nathaniel Wales, Jr. The identity of his wife is disputed. Some sources say Mary Kennion.

== Political and military life ==
Atherton had a very active public life having power and taking part in the law making, enforcing and interpreting affairs of the colony. Subsequent to his acceptance as a freeman, in 1638, he was frequently selectman or treasurer, and for several years a member of the Court of Assistants which gave him a say in the appointment of governors as well as judicial power in criminal and civil matters. In 1638 and 1639–41 he was a governor's assistant in the General Court, and in 1653, he succeeded Daniel Denison as Speaker of the House, leader of the Court of Deputies, which was the lower house of the General Court, representing Springfield, Massachusetts. He was also "long a justice of the peace, and solemnized many marriages". One of the marriages over which he officiated was that of Myles Standish, Jr. and Sarah Winslow.

Atherton was a member of the Ancient and Honorable Artillery Company and he organized the first trained band (militia) in Dorchester. As Major-General in the Suffolk County Militia, he was the senior military officer in New England. which included the responsibilities of subduing and controlling Native Americans and apprehending criminals, such as those accused of heresy.

In 1644 he [Atherton] was sent, with Captains Johnson and Cook, to Narragansett to arrest and try Samuel Gorton for heresy. It is hoped that Gorton's complaint of his treatment was exaggerated, for he said, in passing through Dorchester. 'A large concourse of persons assembled with several ministers to witness the passage of the troops, and the prisoners were stationed apart and volleys of musketry fired over their heads in token of victory.'

=== Other persecutions ===
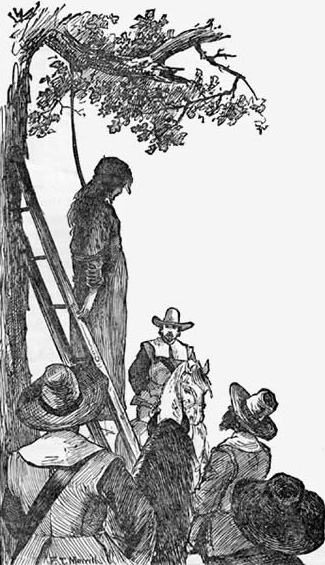
Execution of Ann Hibbins on Boston Common, June 19, 1656. Sketch by F.T. Merril, 1886

Harlow Elliot Woodword, in Epitaphs from the Old Burying Ground in Dorchester, said that Atherton had believed in witches and "felt it to be a duty which he owed to God and to his Country to mete out to the poor creatures, against whom accusations were brought, the punishment, which, in his opinion, they so richly merited." Woodward said that, in his capacity as assistant, Atherton had been instrumental in bringing about the execution of Mrs. Ann Hibbins, a wealthy widow, who was executed for witchcraft on June 19, 1656. Hibbins was later fictionalized in Nathaniel Hawthorne's The Scarlet Letter. In that book she was depicted as the sister of Governor Bellingham.

Atherton was involved in the persecution of Quakers and there are two incidents in particular that the Quakers wrote about in relationship to Atherton. First, the case of Mary Dyer, a Quaker who was executed in 1660 after returning to Boston despite banishment. Atherton was assistant governor at the time, and at her hanging he was said to have remarked, "She hangs there like a flag." The Quakers understood this comment to be an insulting boast.

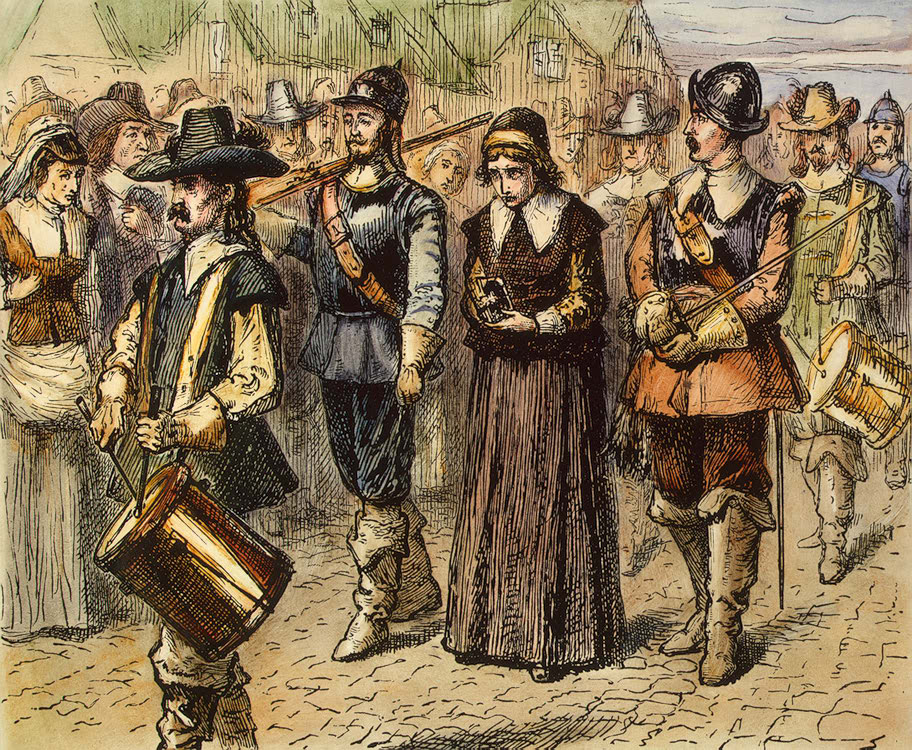
The Quaker “Mary Dyer led to execution on Boston Common, June 1, 1660. Sketch by unknown 19th century artist

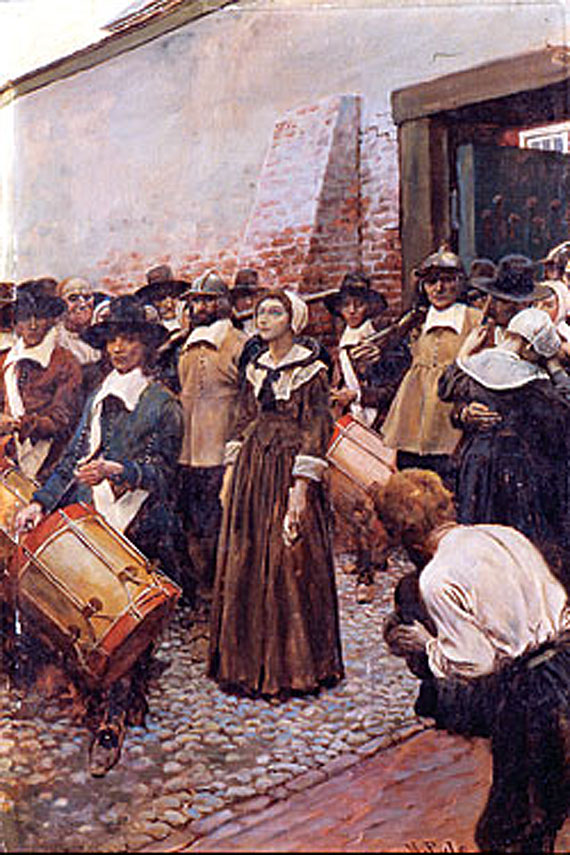
The Quaker “Mary Dyer being led to the gallows in Boston, June 1, 1660. Painted in 1905 by Howard Pyle (1853-1911)

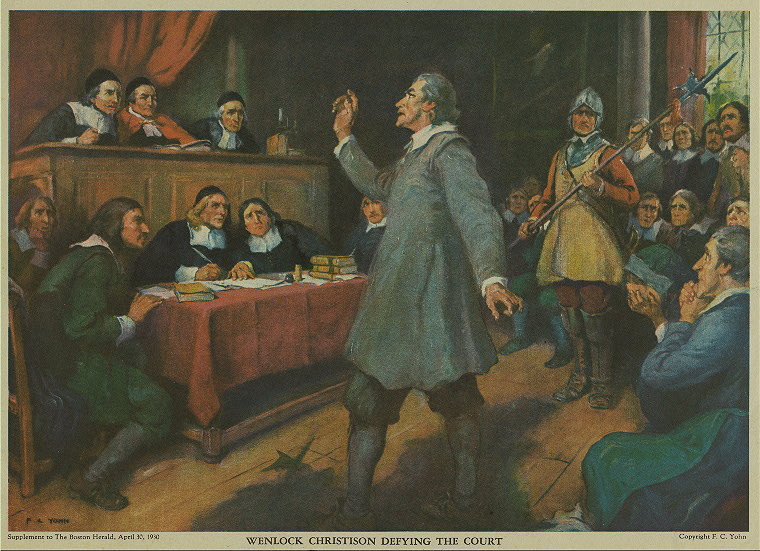

There was the case of Wenlock Christison, a Quaker who had repeatedly returned to Massachusetts despite banishment, whose trial in May, 1661 put an end to the execution of Quakers. He was sentenced to death, but the law was changed soon after, and he was not executed. He was the last Quaker to be sentenced to death in Massachusetts. The Quakers believed that during an altercation between the accused and Atherton at the trial, Christison prophesied the outcome of his trial as well as the circumstances of Atherton's untimely death. Quaker writer George Bishop wrote, "Yea, Wenlock Christison, though they did not put him to death, yet they sentenced him to die, so that their cruel purposes were nevertheless. I cannot forbear to mention what he spoke, being so prophetical, not only as to the judgment of God coming on Major-general Adderton, but as to their putting any more Quakers to death after they had passed sentence on him." Henry Wadsworth Longfellow recreated the Christison trial in his play John Endicott which included the damnation of Atherton by the accused. Henry Wadsworth Longfellow recreated the Christison trial in his play John Endicott which included the damnation of Atherton by the accused.

== Relationship with Native Americans ==
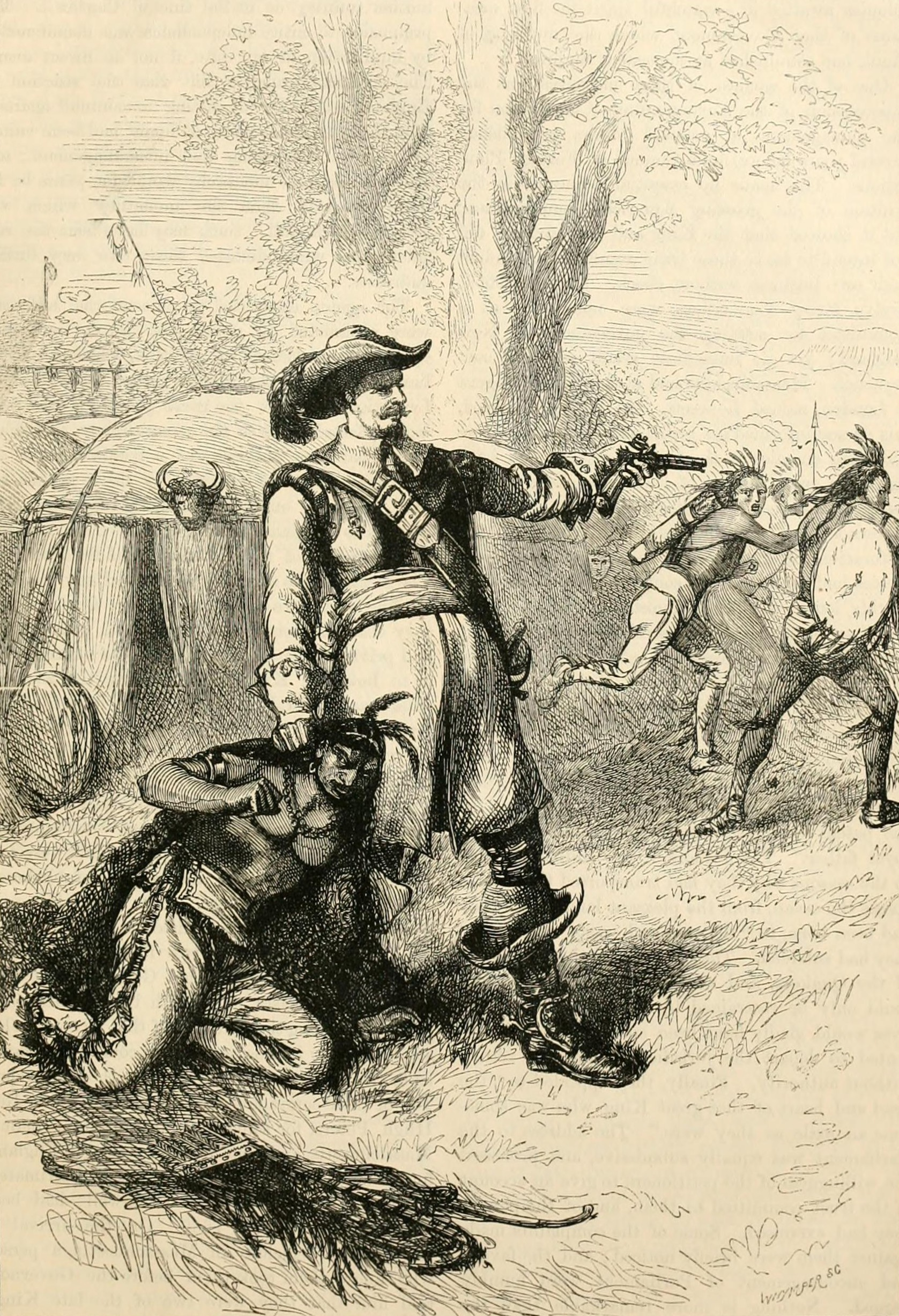
Humphrey Atherton illustrated by Edmund Ollier within Cassell's History of the United States (1874)

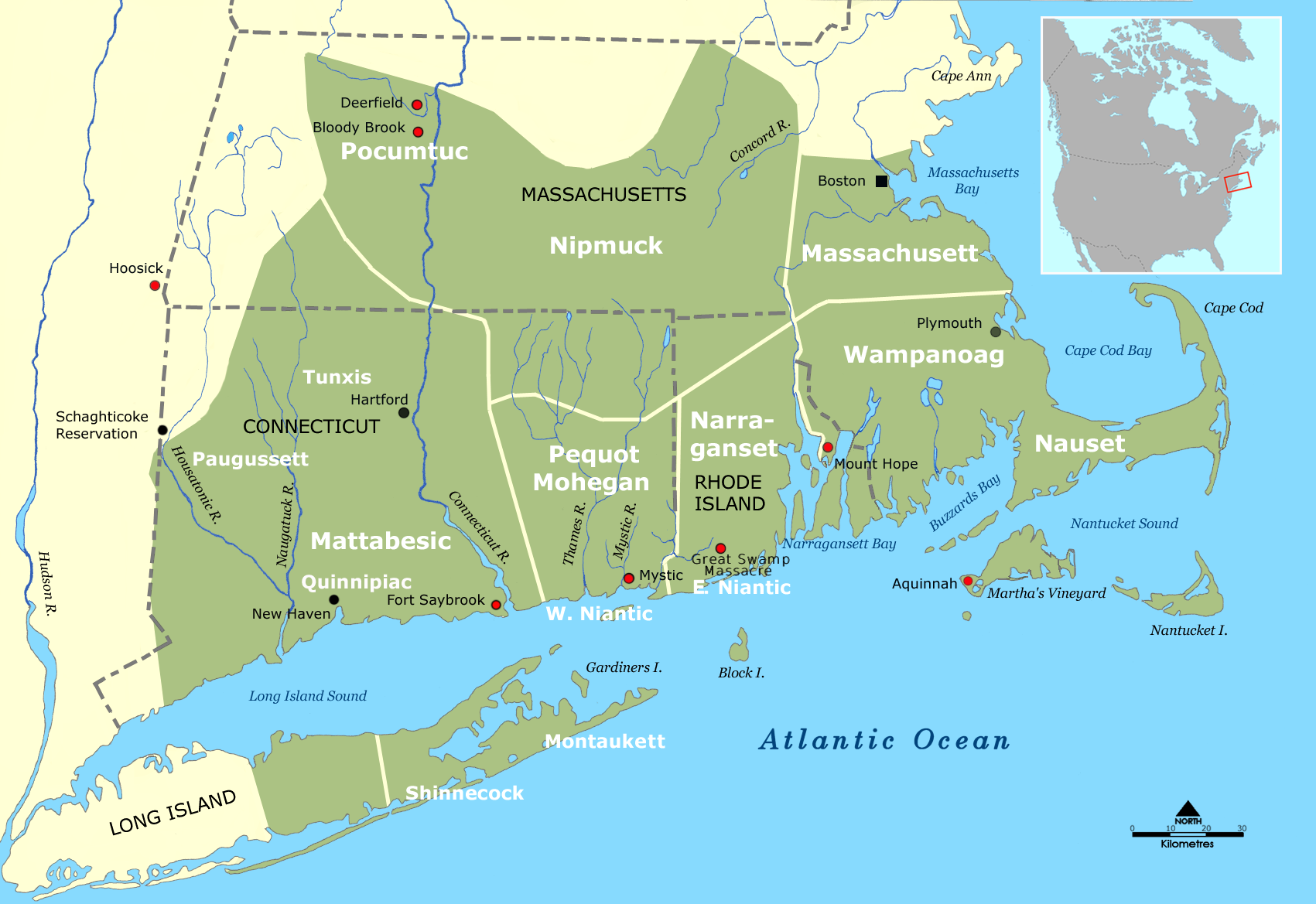
Native American tribal territory during colonial period

Ebenezer Clapp, in The History of Dorchester said of Atherton, "He had great experience and skill in the treatment of the Indians, with whom his public duties brought him in frequent contact. He manifested much humanity and sympathy for their ignorant and degraded condition, but exercised great energy and decision of character when necessary." In 1637 the colonists had sided with the Mohegans in the Pequot War, which wiped out most of the Pequot people. By the early 1640s tensions were building between the Mohegans and the Narragansetts.

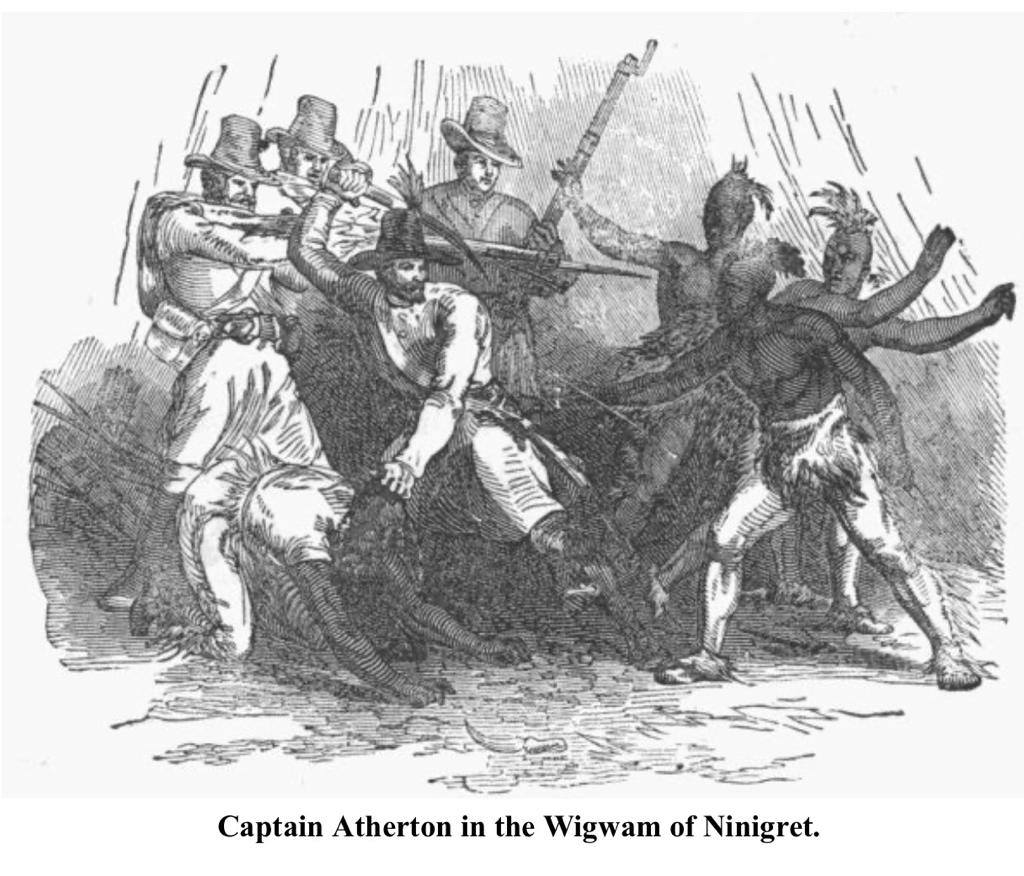
Captain Humphrey Atherton and his men enter Ninigret’s wigwam using force

Ebenezer Clapp, in The History of Dorchester also said "In 1645, the New England Colonies met by representatives to consult upon the Indian problem, and appointed a Council of War; Capt. Miles Standish, of Plymouth, was chairman. John Mason of Connecticut, John Leverett and Atherton of Massachusetts, were the other councilors".

The New England colonies, with the exception of Rhode Island, formed a confederation called "The Four United Colonies of New England". Rhode Island, according to The Proceedings of the Rhode Island Historical Society, 1881–1882, was excluded, not for reasons of religious differences, but because its founder, Roger Williams, had been banished from Massachusetts "for denying the right of the magistrates to take the lands of the Indians with out compensating the owners". The United Colonies obtained Narragansett lands within the boundaries of Rhode Island by putting in motion a series of events that began with their promise of aid to the Mohegan Sachem, Uncas, whom they had supported during the Pequot War, if he declared war against the Narragansett Sachem, Miantinomo. During the ensuing war, Miantinomo was captured and brought to the commissioners of the Four United Colonies at Hartford. "After obtaining him as a captive, they could find no excuse for putting him to death; and, to avoid the responsibility, they referred his case for decision to a convention of ministers in Boston; [sic] Winthrop states, 'Miantinomo was killed near Hartford by a blow on the back of his head with a hatchet.' "

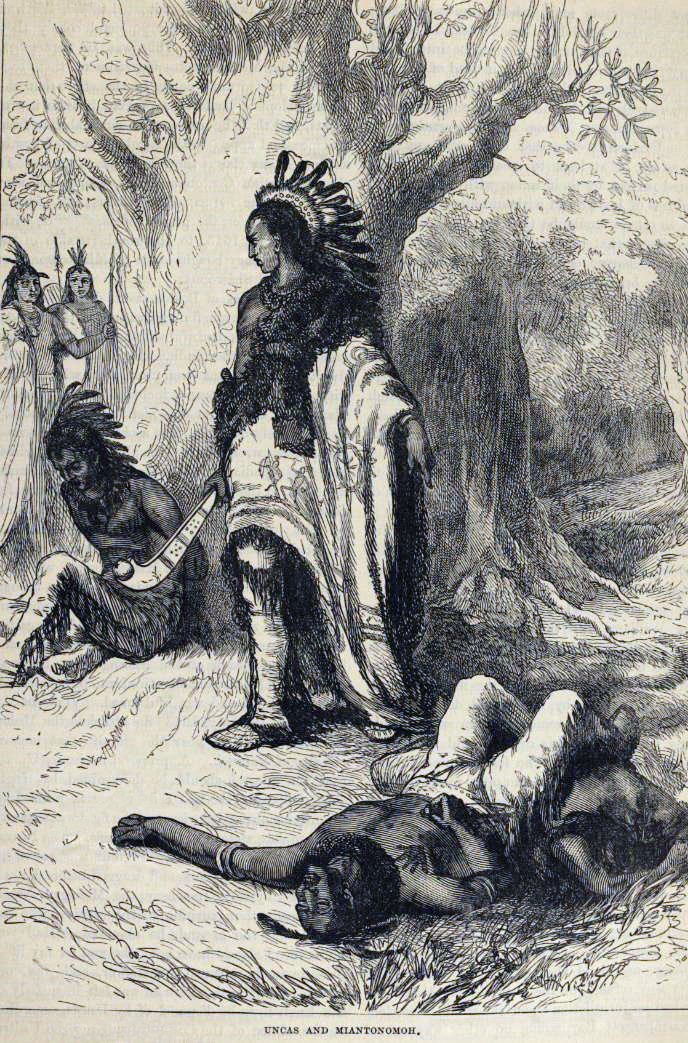
Uncas and Miantinomo

The Connecticut settlers demanded land from Uncas in return for their assistance to him. "Trumbull states, 'Mr. Leffingwell obtained nearly the whole township of Norwich for his services.'" Miantinomo's successor, Pessicus, declared war against Uncas and the colonies fined him 2000 fathoms of wampum for causing the hostilities, which he was unable to pay."

Humphrey Atherton was sent by the commissioners of the Four Colonies, with twenty armed men, to enforce the payment. As stated in Arnold's history of Rhode Island (vol. i., p. 199), 'Atherton forced his way, pistol in hand, into the wigwam, and, seizing the Sachem by the hair, dragged him out, threatening instant death if any resistance was offered.' The debt was settled by Pessicus giving a mortgage of all his lands to the commissioners of the Four Colonies.

In 1658, Atherton came into contact with Native Americans again when he was appointed by the General Court to the post of Superintendent of Indian Affairs, overseeing the praying Indians; Nipmuck Indians who had been converted to Christianity by John Eliot. He held that position until his death. "Though a terror to warlike Indians, yet he was the trusted friend of all who were well disposed, helping on their education and Christianizing, and guarding their rights, so that he had immense personal influence with them, and was a successful treaty-maker".

== Appointment as Major General ==
In 1656, he was appointed Major-General, becoming the Chief Military Officer in New England, replacing Robert Sedgwick. He was the fifth holder of this rank. His predecessors were Thomas Dudley, John Endicott, Edward Gibbons and Robert Sedgwick.

== Land speculation ==
Humphrey Atherton was a successful land speculator. The land he owned in Dorchester included a large portion of South Boston. He also owned a share in what became Milton, Massachusetts. The General Court awarded 500 acres (2.0 km^{2}) to him for his public service, but because some of it impeded the town on Hadley, Massachusetts, he was given a new grant that had an additional 200 acres (0.81 km^{2}). Since he had represented Springfield in the General Court, he probably owned land in Springfield as well. When he died, his estate was worth 900 pounds, not including much of his land.

Atherton "played a key role in fighting and removing Indians from land he later owned." In 1659, he and some friends, including Connecticut Governor, John Winthrop, Jr., made some purchases of land from Native Americans on the western side of Narragansett Bay for which Rhode Island had claimed. The group, referred to as the Atherton Trading Company, circumvented Rhode Island's law by acquiring the land when the Natives defaulted on a loan.

In 1660, commissioners of the Four Colonies, of whom John Winthrop, Jr. was one, transferred ownership of the mortgage of Pessicus's land to the Atherton Trading Company for 735 fathoms of wampum. The Company then foreclosed on the mortgage. The land included the Narragansett property within the bounds of Rhode Island. Rhode Island found this transference of land to be illegal and prevented the sale of the land for several years. The company, which changed its name to "Proprietors of the Narragansett Country," eventually did sell 5,000 acres (20 km^{2}) of the land to Huguenot immigrants who began a colony there called Frenchtown. The Huguenots lost the land when, in 1688, a Royal Commission determined the Atherton claim to be illegal.

== Death ==
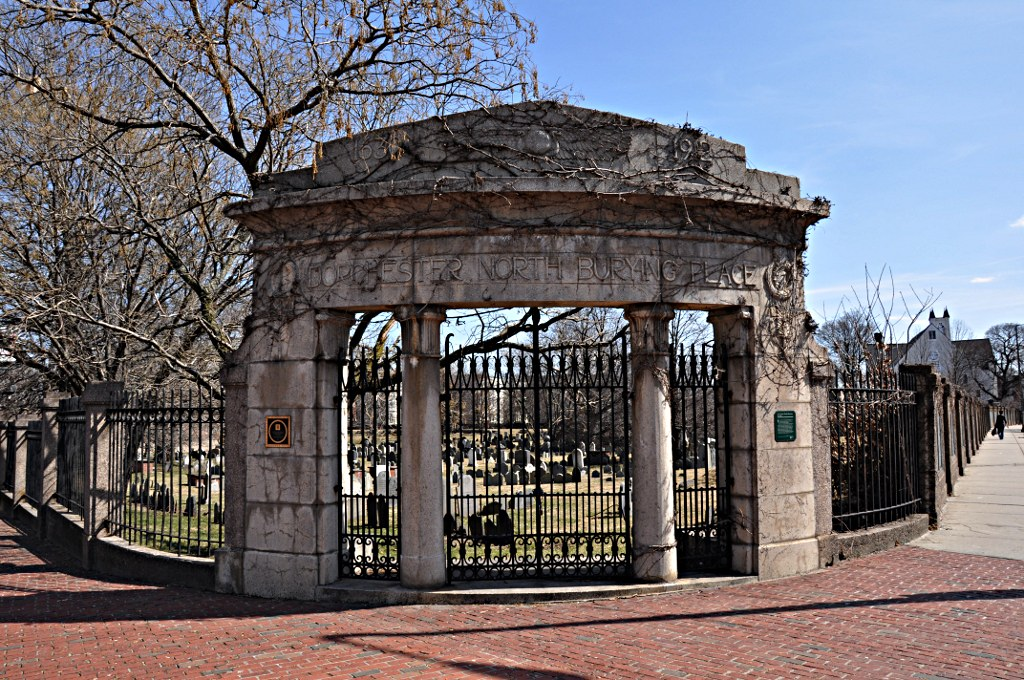
Dorchester North Burying Place, where Major-General Humphrey Atherton is interred

Humphrey Atherton died, September 16, 1661, from head injuries sustained in a fall from his horse. He was traveling through Boston Common, on his way home after drilling his troops when his mount collided with a cow.

Harlow E. Woodward, aforementioned author of Epitaphs from the Old Burying Ground in Dorchester, said that because of Atherton's persecution of the Quakers, "they believed his horrible death to be God's visitation of wrath." Woodward credits Joseph Besse, a Quaker author, with the following account of Atherton's death:

Humfray Adderton, who at the trial of Wenlock Christison, did, as it were, bid defiance to Heaven, by saying to Wenlock, 'You pronounce Woes and Judgements, and those that are gone before you pronounced Woes and Judgements; but the Judgements of the Lord God are not upon us yet,' was suddenly surprised: having been, on a certain day, exercising his men with much pomp and ostentation, he was returning home in the evening, near the place where they usually loosed the Quakers from the cart, after they had whipped them, his horse, suddenly affrighted, threw him with such violence, that he instantly died; his eyes being dashed out of his head, and his brains coming out of his nose, his tongue hanging out at his mouth, and the blood running out at his ears: Being taken up and brought into the Courthouse, the place where he had been active in sentencing the innocent to death, his blood ran through the floor, exhibiting to the spectators a shocking instance of the Divine vengeance against a daring and hardened persecutor; that made a fearful example of that divine judgment, which, when forewarned of, he had openly despised, and treated with disdain.

Longfellow repeated this sentiment in his account of Atherton's death in the final scene of John Endicott. In the scene Governor Endicott, while speaking to Richard Bellingham, asks if it is true that Humphrey Atherton is dead. Bellingham confirms that he is and adds, "His horse took fright, and threw him to the ground, so that his brains were dashed about the street." Endicott responds, "I am not superstitions, Bellingham, and yet I tremble lest it may have been a judgment on him."

Humphrey Atherton, whose wife, Mary died in 1672. is interred at the Dorchester North Burying Place in Boston. Engraved upon his tombstone are the following words:

Here lies our Captain & Major of Suffolk was withall;
A godly magistrate was he, and Major General;
Two troop horse with him here comes, such worth his love did crave
Two companies of foot also mourning march to his grave,
Let all that read be sure to keep the faith as he has done
With Christ he lives now crowned, his name was Humphrey Atherton.

== Legacy ==
Humphrey Atherton and his wife, Mary had eleven children.

They had five sons; Jonathan, their first born, was a mariner. Increase, also a mariner, died at sea, aged 31, on the Friezland, whilst in the service of the Guiney Company. Hope Atherton, was minister of Hadley, Massachusetts and married Sarah Hollister. Consider, married Ann Anable. Watching, married Elizabeth Rigbee.

They had six daughters, Elizabeth Catherine “Isabel” married Timothy Mather, followed by Nathaniel Wales Jr. and then William Weekes. Margaret married James Trowbridge. Mary married William Billings and then Joseph Weeks. Rest married Obadiah Swift. Thankful married Thomas Bird of Dorchester. Patience, married Isaac Humphrey.

Among the family genealogies that the Humphrey Atherton family are included in are The Trowbridge genealogy: History of the Trowbridge family in America by Francis Bacon Trowbridge. The History of the Dorchester Pope Family: 1634–1888, by Charles Henry Pope and Hall Ancestry, by Charles Samuel Hall. George Caster Martin traced his ancestry to Atherton in his article Humphrey Atherton: Founder of the Atherton Family of New England in National Genealogical Society Quarterly, Volume 1, Issue 4. In the National Genealogical Society Quarterly, Volume 60, some of Humphrey Atherton's descendants are included in the Belcher Genealogy. In the same volume, Samuel Atherton's ancestry was traced to Humphrey Atherton. William B. Task claimed descent from Atherton in the 1899 New England Historical Genealogical Register.

Atherton continued to be revered by his community after his death. Thirty years later and Thomas Maule was arrested on charges of slanderous publication about the manner of his untimely death, and was imprisoned for twelve months and his pamphlets were ordered to be burnt.

Joshua Atherton journaled the Atherton family origins in the 18th century.
