= List of Punahou School alumni =

This is a list of notable graduates, students who attended, and former faculty of Punahou School, a private, co-educational, college preparatory school in Honolulu, Hawaii. An asterisk (*) indicates a person who attended Punahou but did not graduate with senior class. Parents and children of alumni are noted only if they have made significant achievements in the same field or activity.

== Olympic athletes and other world champions ==
=== Beach volleyball ===
- '90 Kevin Wong (UCLA)—2000
- '91 Stein Metzger (UCLA)—2004
- '10 Taylor Crabb (Long Beach State)—2021

=== Diving ===
- '69 Keala O'Sullivan (Hawaiʻi)—1968 bronze medalist

=== Dressage (equestrian) ===
- '72* Sandy Pflueger—1984 (attended 1959–69)

=== Kayaking ===
- '92 Kathryn Colin (Washington)—2000, 2004
- '97 Andrew Bussey (UC Irvine)—2004

=== Sailing ===
- '66 David Rockwell McFaull (Cornell)—1976 silver medalist
- '72 Michael Jon Rothwell—1976 silver medalist
- '76 Keani Reiner

=== Surfing ===
- '10 Carissa Moore, first Olympic gold medal in women's short board surfing in 2020

=== Swimming ===
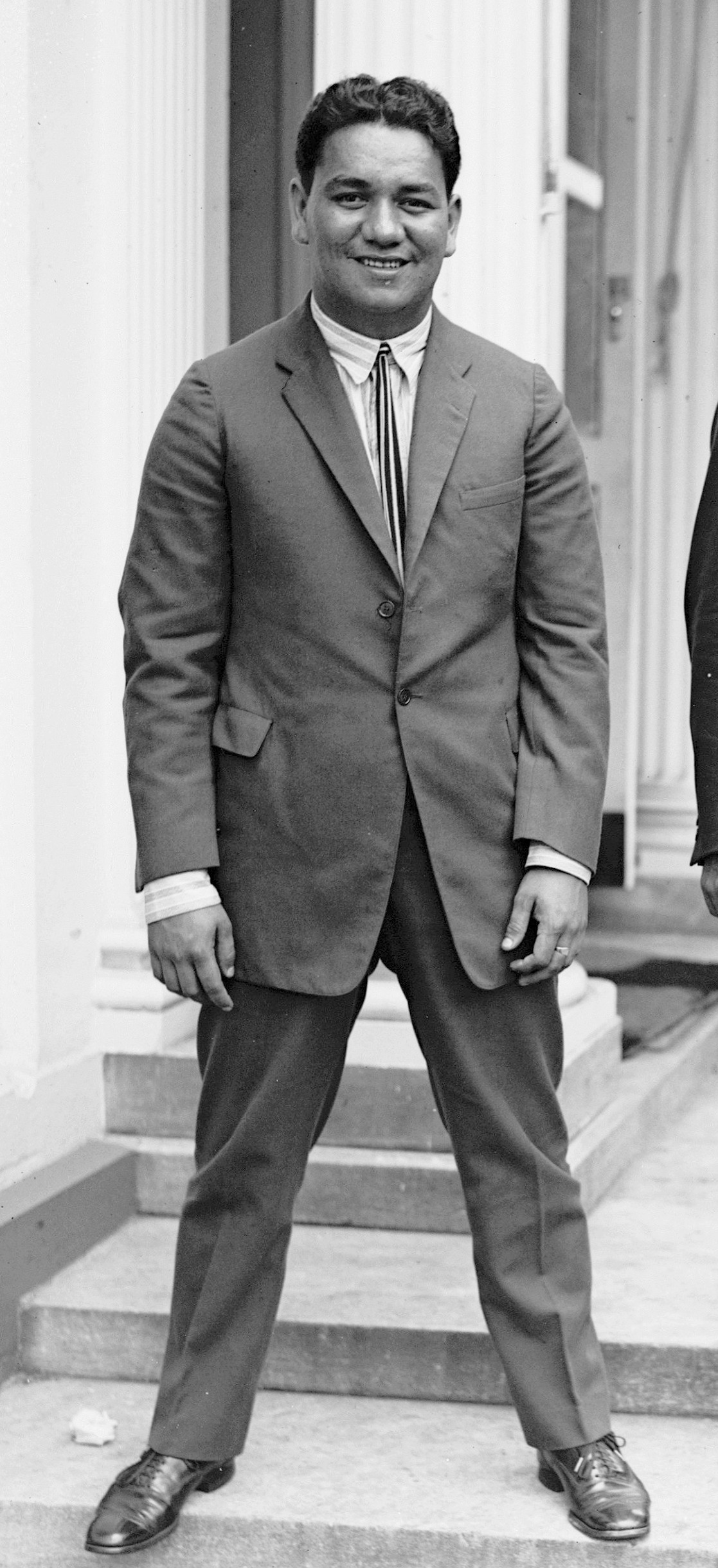
Warren Kealoha, 1920 and 1924 gold medalist in swimming

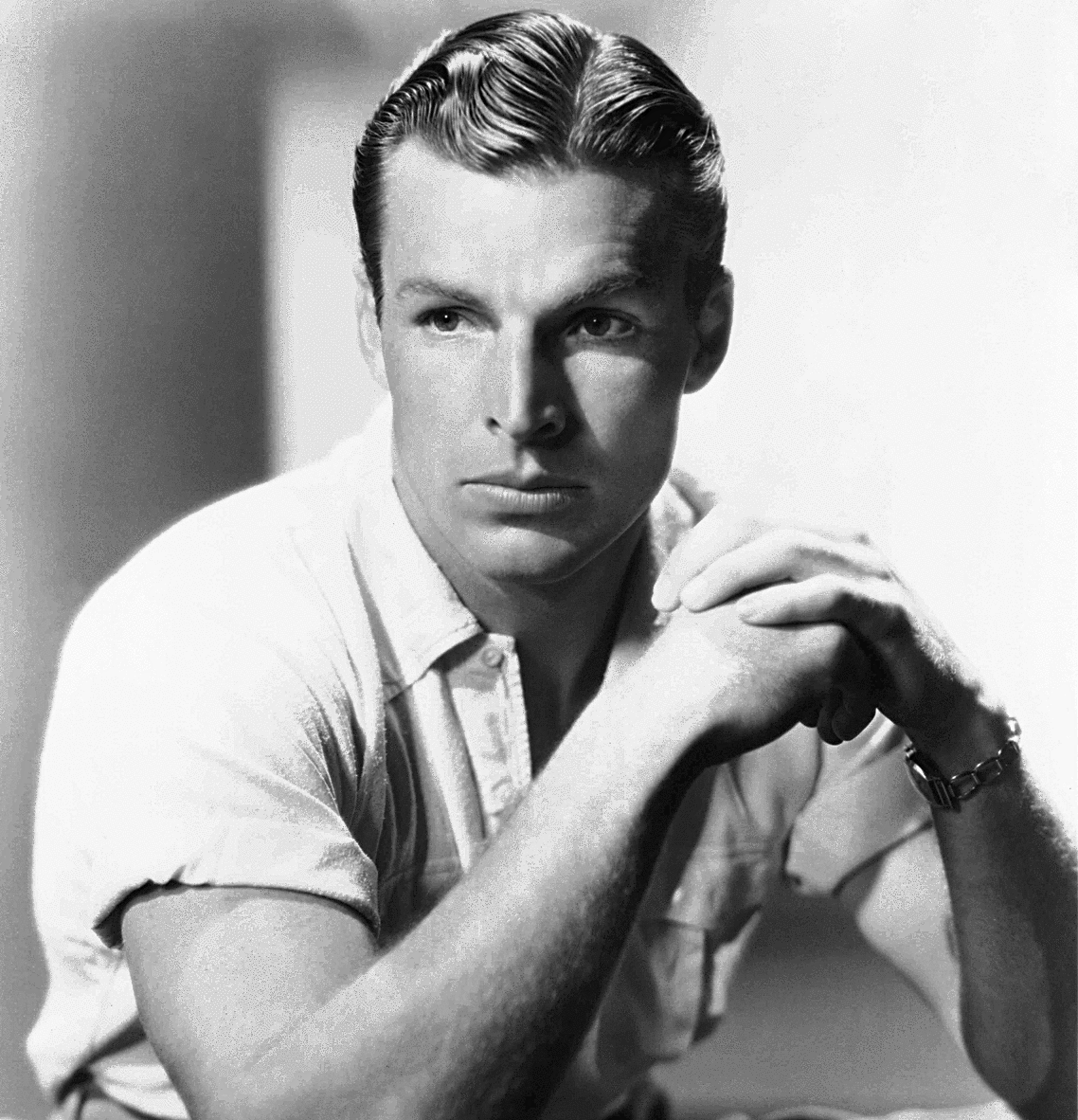
Buster Crabbe, 1928 bronze and 1932 gold medalist in swimming, then Hollywood leading man

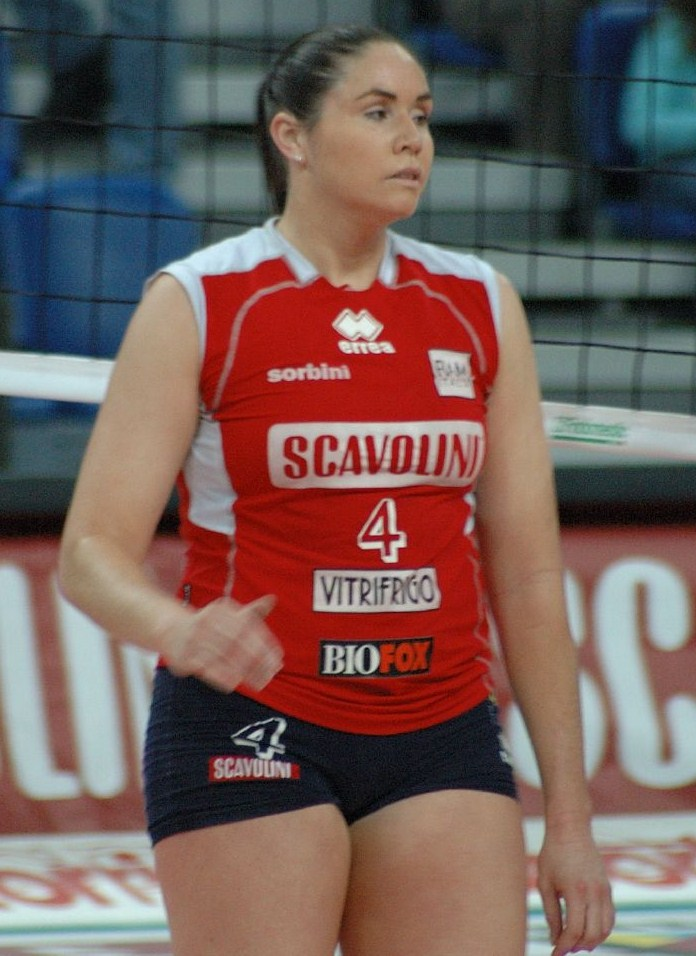
Lindsey Berg, two-time silver medalist setter for US Volleyball, 2004, 2008, and 2012

- '24* Mariechen Wehselau Jackson—1924 gold and silver medalist (attended 1912–23)
- '24 Helen Moses
- '25* Warren Kealoha—1920 gold medalist (youngest male US gold in swimming), 1924 gold medalist (attended 1920–22)
- '27 Buster Crabbe (Southern Cal)—1928 bronze medalist, 1932 gold medalist (see also below)
- '47 Dick Cleveland (Hawaiʻi, Ohio State)—1952, four-time world record holder, International Swimming Hall of Fame
- '67 Brent Thales Berk (Stanford)—1968
- '76 Chris Woo (Indiana)—1976
- 2009 Christel Simms (USC)—2008

=== Volleyball ===
- '66 Miki Briggs McFadden (USC)—1968
- '92 Mike Lambert (Stanford)—1996, 2000
- '98 Lindsey Berg (Minnesota)—2004, 2008, and 2012 silver medalist
- 2008 Erik Shoji (Stanford)—2016, 2020

=== Water polo ===
- '84 Christopher Duplanty (UC Irvine)—silver medalist 1988, 1992, 1996, 2000
- '97 Sean Kern (UCLA)—2000
- '99 Brandon Brooks (UCLA)—2004, 2008 silver medalist

=== Track ===
- '72 Henry Marsh (BYU)—1976, 1980 team, 1984, 1988

=== Other world champion athletes and recent All-Americans ===
- '99 Elisa Au (Hawaiʻi)—3-time World Karate Federation World Champion, Black Belt Magazine Hall of Fame, 2005 best amateur athlete, Sullivan Award finalist

== Athletes ==
=== Football ===
- '27 Henry Thomas "Hank" "Honolulu" Hughes (Oregon State)—original Boston Braves football player in 1932 (10 games)
- '48 Herman Clark (Oregon State)—Chicago Bears offensive lineman 1952-57 (52 games)
- '48 Jim Clark (Oregon State)—Washington Redskins offensive lineman 1952-53 (20 games) and Hawaii state senator
- '49 Charlie Ane Jr. (USC)—Detroit Lions offensive lineman 1953-59 (83 games), team captain for two NFL championships and two-time Pro Bowl selection
- '59* Ray Schoenke (Southern Methodist)—Dallas Cowboys and Washington Redskins offensive lineman 1963-75 (145 games), unsuccessful Democratic candidate for Maryland Governor, 1998, founding president of American Hunters and Shooters Association (attended 1956–58)
- '64 Norm Chow (Utah)—CFL player, former Tennessee Titans offensive coordinator, former University of Hawaiʻi at Mānoa head coach

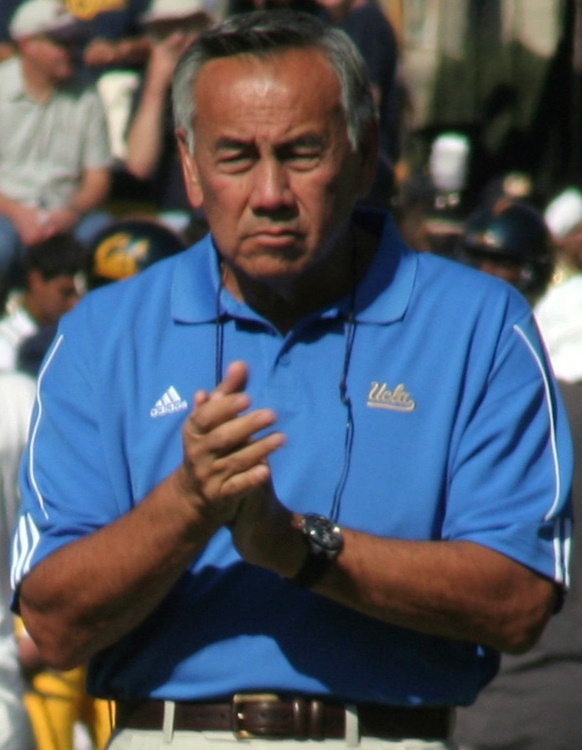
Norm Chow, former NFL offensive coordinator

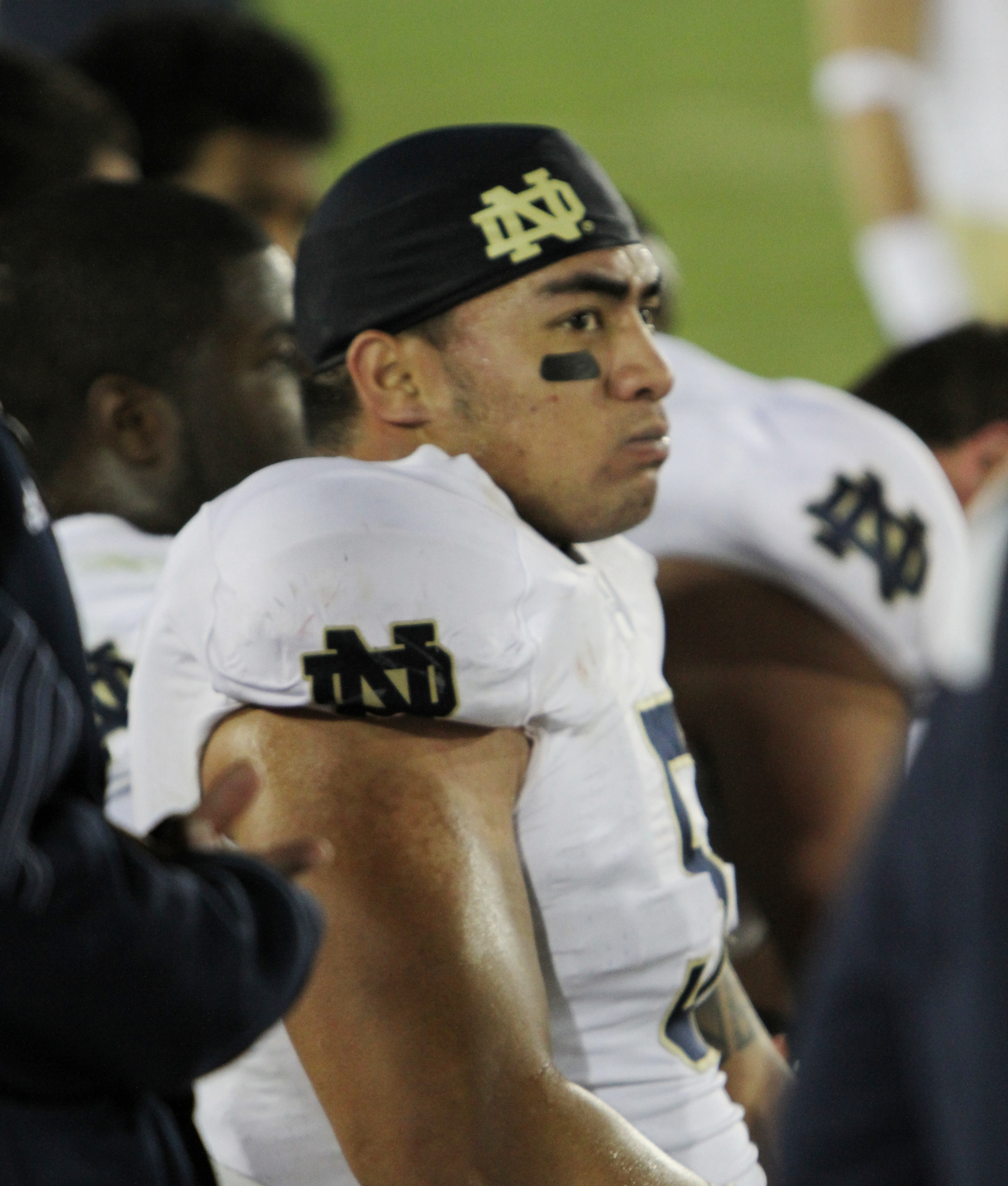
Manti Te'o, NFL rookie linebacker

- '71 Arnold Morgado, Jr. (Hawaiʻi)—Kansas City Chiefs running back 1977-80 (52 games), city councilman
- '71 Charles "Kale" Ane III (Michigan State)—offensive lineman for Kansas City Chiefs and Green Bay Packers, 1975-1981 (105 games)
- '74 Mosi Tatupu (USC)—New England Patriots running back 1978-91 (199 games), one Super Bowl, one Pro Bowl, college football Mosi Tatupu Award, father of Lofa Tatupu
- '78 Mark Tuinei (Hawaiʻi)—Dallas Cowboys offensive lineman 1983-97 (195 games), two Pro Bowls and three Super Bowls
- '80 John Kamana III (USC)—Los Angeles Rams and Atlanta Falcons running back (5 games)
- '09 Manti Teʻo (Notre Dame)—signed by the San Diego Chargers, 2012 Heisman Trophy finalist
- '12 DeForest Buckner (Oregon)—NFL defensive tackle for the Indianapolis Colts, drafted by the San Francisco 49ers in 2016
- '12 Kaʻimi Fairbairn (UCLA)—NFL place kicker for the Houston Texans
- '18 Andrei Iosivas (Princeton)—NFL wide receiver for the Cincinnati Bengals
- '19 Marist Liufau (Notre Dame)—NFL linebacker for the Dallas Cowboys

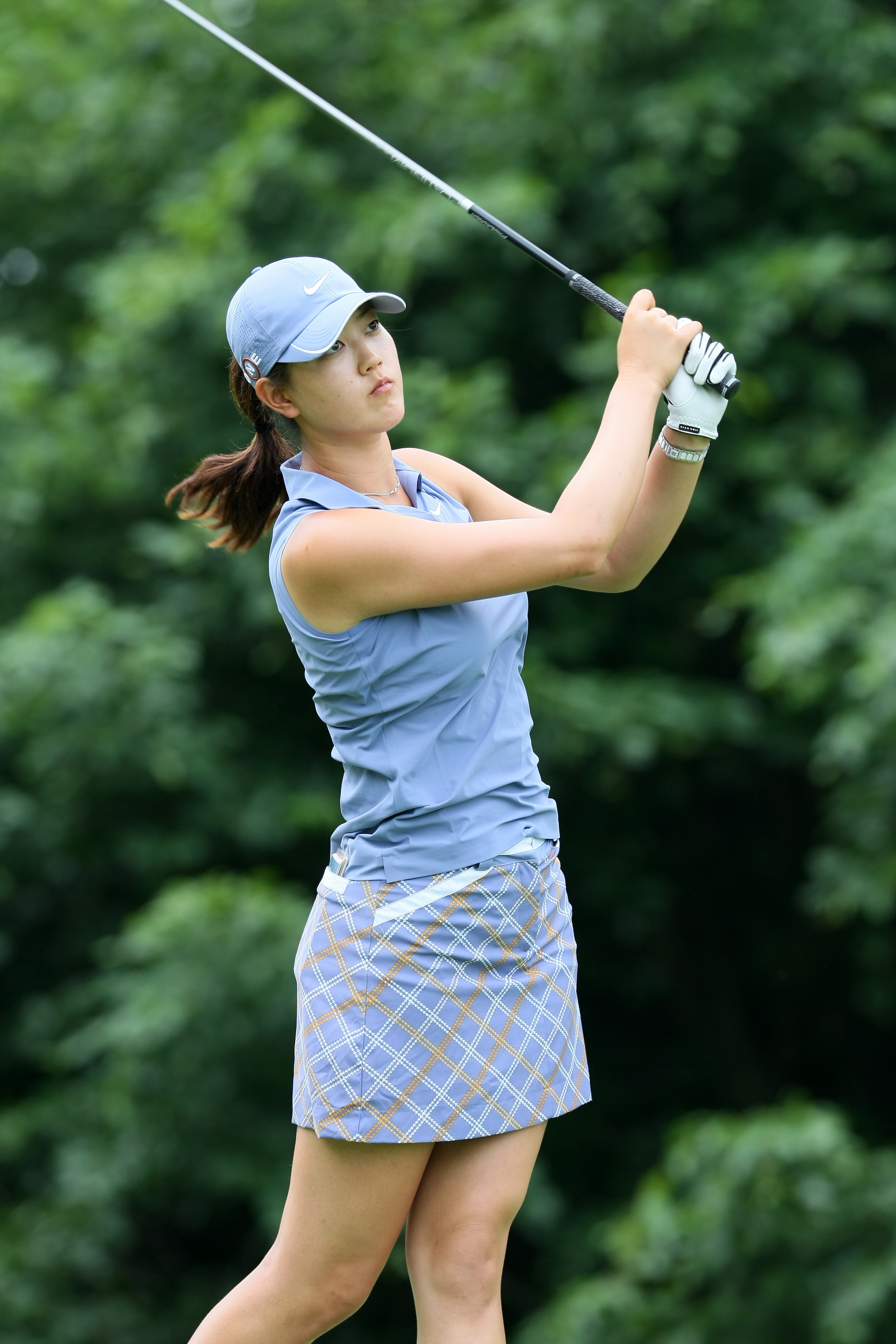
Michelle Wie, LPGA winner

=== Baseball ===
- '81* Joey Meyer, Jr. (Hawaiʻi)—Milwaukee Brewers first baseman 1988-89 (156 games)
- '97 Justin Wayne (Stanford)—Florida Marlins pitcher 2002-04 (pitched in 26 games)
- '14 KJ Harrison

=== Tennis ===
- '63 Jim Osborne (Utah)—5-time Grand Prix tennis circuit doubles winner

=== Golf ===
- '97 Parker McLachlin (UCLA)—winner on PGA Tour, 4-time top-10 finisher in 53 events (2001–2008)
- '99 Bridget Dwyer (UCLA)—#9 on LPGA Futures Tour, #2 on The Big Break VI
- 2007 Michelle Wie (Stanford)—2-time LPGA winner, winning Solheim Cup team member, 36-time top-10 finisher
- '16 Allisen Corpuz (USC)—2023 U.S. Women's Open champion, LPGA Tour golfer, Solheim Cup team member.

=== Surfing ===
- '65 Fred Hemmings, Jr.—1968 world surfing champion, Hawaii state senator, Republican minority leader
- '66 Gerry Lopez—1972 and 1973 Pipeline Masters champion (see also below)
- '67 Jeff Hakman—1974 and 1975 world surfing champion and founder of Quiksilver (see also below)
- '10 Carissa Moore—2011 ASP Women's World Tour Champion; multiple ASP Elite victories; 2010 ASP Rookie of the Year and 11 National Scholastic Surfing Association (NSSA) titles; 2020 gold medalist

=== Mixed martial arts ===
- '09 Ilima-Lei Macfarlane—professional mixed martial artist, inaugural and former Bellator MMA Flyweight Champion

== Medical doctors ==
- '45 Calvin C.J. Sia (Dartmouth)—developer and leading advocate of the nationwide Medical Home concept for pediatric care and federal Emergency Medical Services for Children program
- '69 Dale T. Umetsu (Columbia)—endowed professor of pediatrics at Harvard

== Other educators and researchers ==
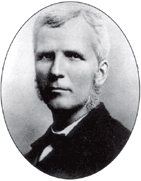
General Samuel Chapman Armstrong, founder of Hampton University, one of many heroes at Gettysburg

=== Administrators and general subjects ===
- '70 Robert Spitzer (Gonzaga)—president of Gonzaga University

=== Law and business ===
- '33 Honorable Samuel P. King—federal district court judge, Ninth Circuit; co-author, Broken Trust: Greed, Mismanagement and Political Manipulation at America's Largest Charitable Trust
- '48 Isaac Shapiro (Columbia)—Professor of Law at NYU and Columbia, Working but Poor: America's Contradiction, The Soviet Legal System
- '54 Robert M. Seto (Saint Louis U)—emeritus professor of Law at Regent University, federal patent and contracts judge
- '61 William Ouchi (Williams)—endowed professor of Business at UCLA, U Chicago, and Stanford, Theory Z and Making Schools Work, Chief of Staff of LA Mayor Richard Riordan

=== Science ===
- '46 Alison Kay (Mills)—malacologist and Fulbright scholar, Shells of Hawaii, Natural History of the Hawaiian Islands

=== Logic, philosophy, mathematics, computing and engineering ===
- '79 Ronald Loui (Harvard)—professor of computer science at Wash U, patent holder on packet processing hardware, Knowledge Representation and Defeasible Reasoning and Legal Knowledge and Information Systems

=== Social science ===
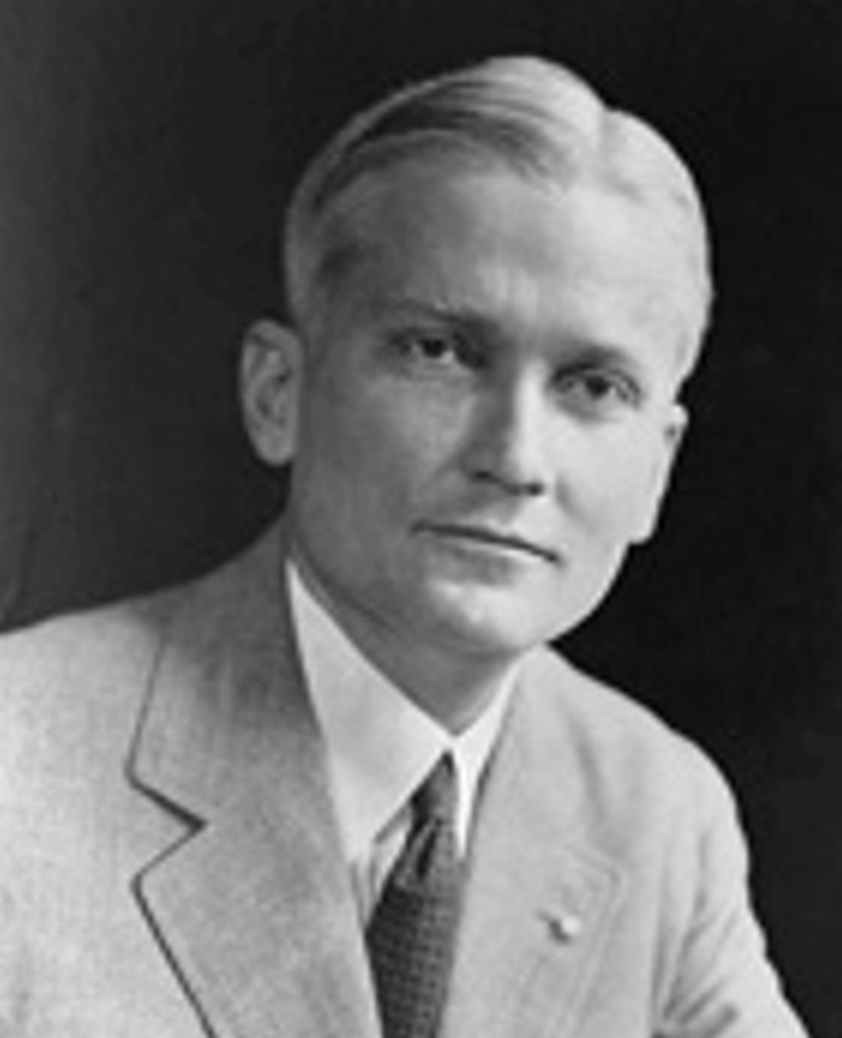
U.S. Senator from Connecticut Hiram Bingham III, professor of History at Yale and explorer, possible inspiration for Indiana Jones

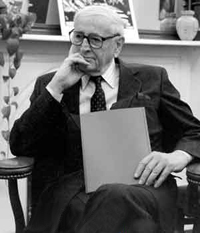
Secretary of HEW John W. Gardner, architect of the Great Society, professor of Management, and Education at Stanford, awarded Presidential Medal of Freedom

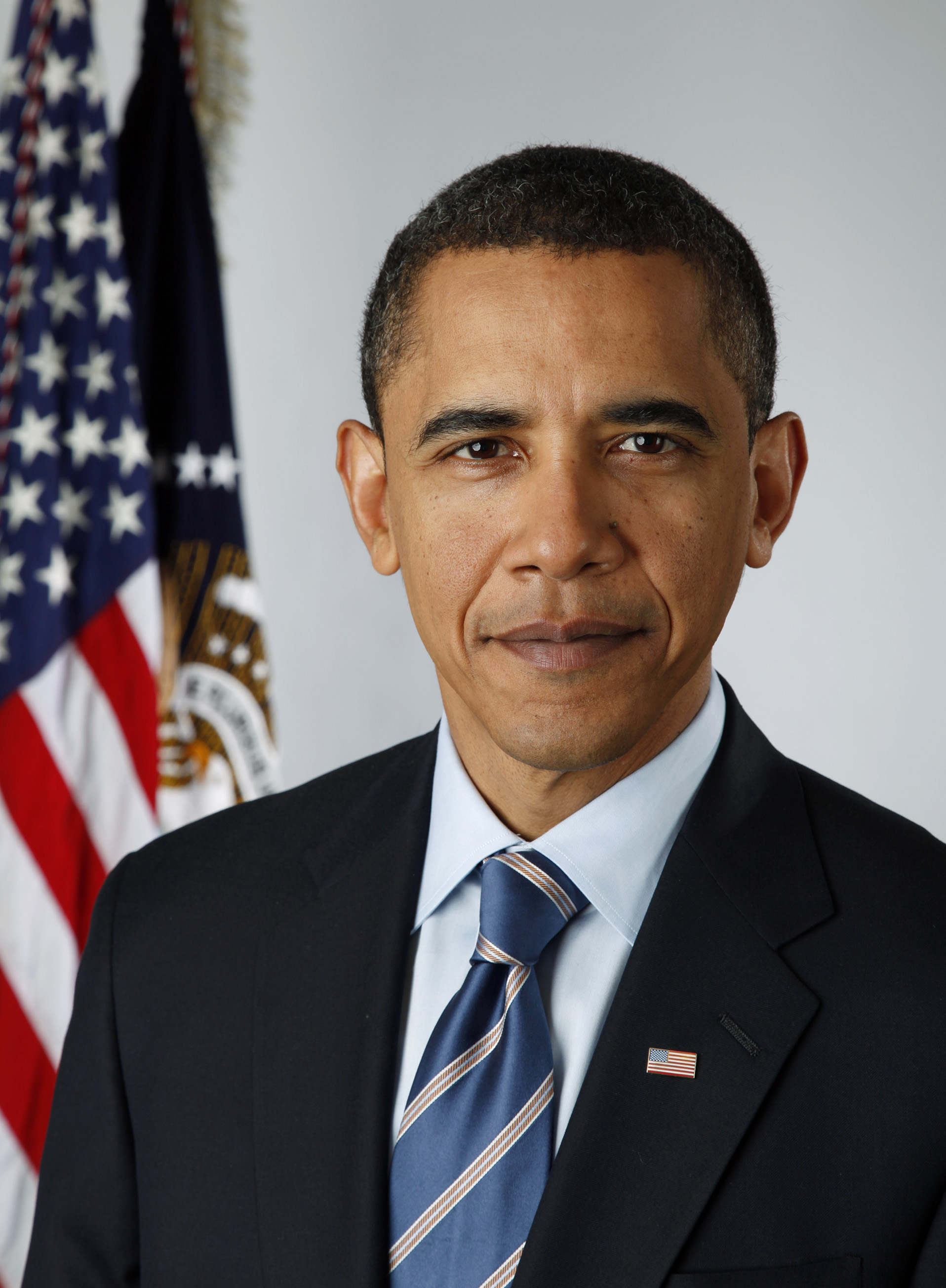
U.S. President Barack Obama, formerly U.S. Senator from Illinois, Constitutional Law Lecturer at University of Chicago

- '31* (?) Paul Linebarger, a.k.a. Cordwainer Smith—instructor in government at Harvard, professor of Political Science at Duke and Johns Hopkins, fifteen books of science fiction, five nonfiction works including Psychological Warfare, Bronze Star, Army Major, helped form Office of War Information, advisor to CIA and John F. Kennedy, buried at Arlington National Cemetery (attended 1919–20)
- '43 Joyce Lebra Chapman (Minnesota)—Fulbright Scholar, emerita professor of History at Colorado, nine books on women and Asia
- '68 Patrick Vinton Kirch (Penn)—endowed professor of anthropology at UC Berkeley, elected to American Philosophical Society, nine books on oceanic and Polynesian prehistory
- '78 John Lie (Harvard)—endowed professor of sociology at UC Berkeley and U Illinois, dean of international studies, six books on Korea, Japan, and two textbooks on sociology

== Civil rights leaders ==
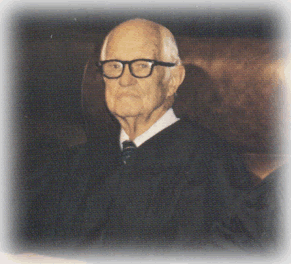
Honorable Judge Elbert Tuttle, brigadier general, leader of the federal court that desegregated the South, awarded Presidential Medal of Freedom

- 1859 Samuel C. Armstrong (Williams)—defeated Pickett's Charge at Battle of Gettysburg and commanded 8th U.S. Colored Troops, founding president of Hampton University and mentor of Booker T. Washington, honorary LLD from Harvard; subject of Educating the Disfranchised and Disinherited and Armstrong: A Biographical Study; Armstrong High School (Richmond, Virginia)
- '14 Elbert Tuttle (Cornell)—chief judge of US Court of Appeals 1954-68 appointed by Dwight Eisenhower, leader of the Fifth Circuit Four ruling on Southern desegregation cases, Presidential Medal of Freedom, honorary LLD from Harvard, subject of book Unlikely Heroes, inductee of International Civil Rights Walk of Fame (Atlanta), oldest serving federal judge at 98, brigadier general, Bronze Star, Purple Heart, and Legion of Merit, Elbert Parr Tuttle US Court of Appeals and Anti Defamation League's Elbert P. Tuttle Jurisprudence Award
- '29* John W. Gardner (Stanford)—subject of PBS documentary Uncommon American, Presidential Medal of Freedom, Secretary of HEW 1965-68 under Lyndon Johnson, launched Medicare, Common Cause, Corporation for Public Broadcasting, Urban Coalition, Model UN, and White House Fellows Program, Marine Corps Captain at Office of Strategic Services, head of Carnegie Foundation, professor at Mount Holyoke College and Stanford, offered Robert F. Kennedy's vacated Senate seat (declined), author of seven books including speeches and papers of John F. Kennedy, John W. Gardner Center (Stanford University) and John W. Gardner Leadership Award (attended 1920–22)

== Other elected representatives, government appointees, judges ==
=== United States presidents ===
- '79 Barack Obama (Columbia)—44th president of the United States 2008–2016, Democratic US senator from Illinois 2004-2008

=== U.S. senators ===
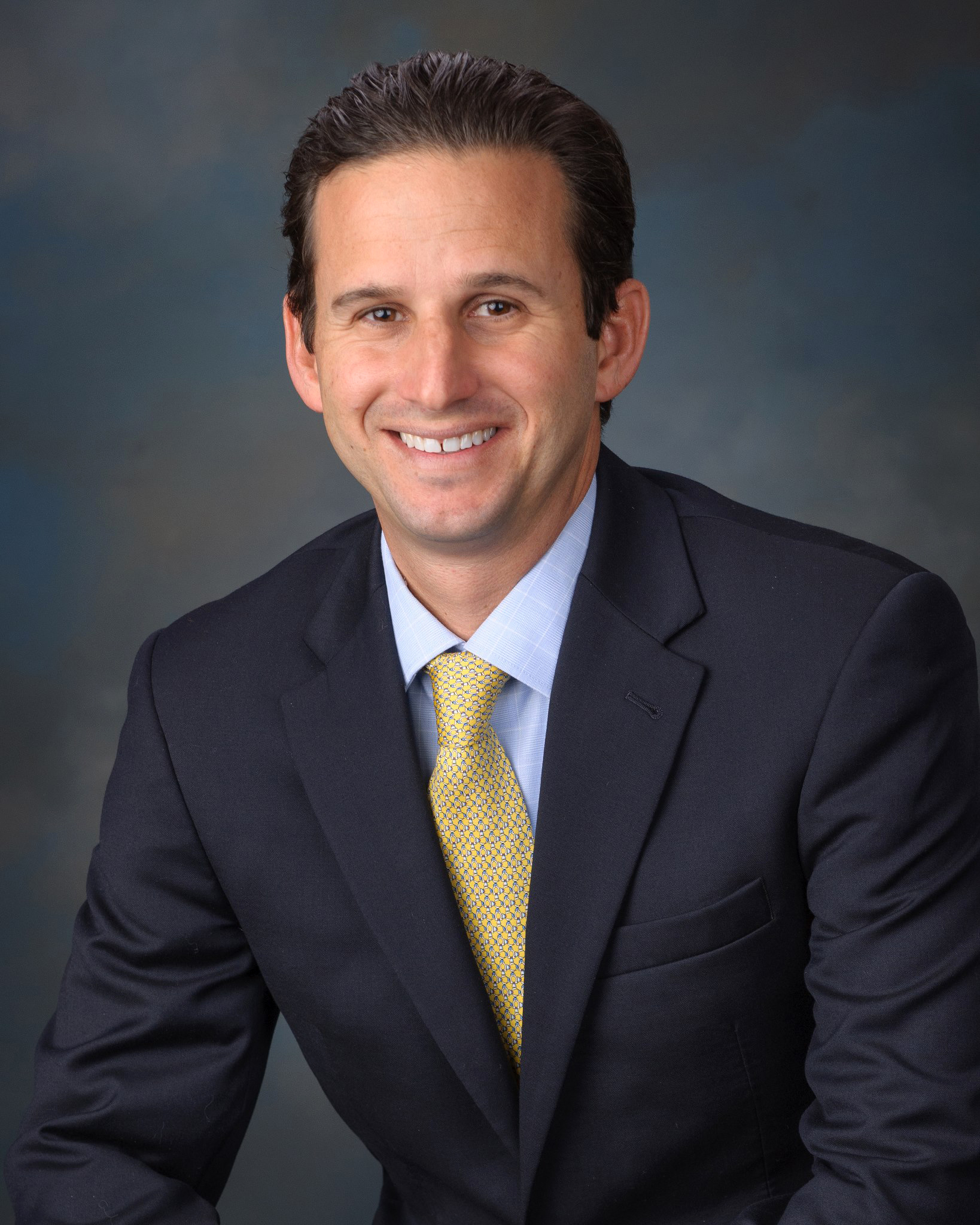
Brian Schatz, US senator and Hawaii lieutenant governor

- 1892 Hiram Bingham (Yale)—Republican US senator from Connecticut 1924–33, discoverer of Machu Picchu, lecturer at Harvard and Princeton, professor of History at Yale, spouse of the Tiffany fortune heiress, buried at Arlington National Cemetery, possible inspiration for Indiana Jones
- '90 Brian Schatz (Pomona)—Democratic US senator from Hawaii, former lieutenant governor of Hawaii

=== U.S. representatives ===
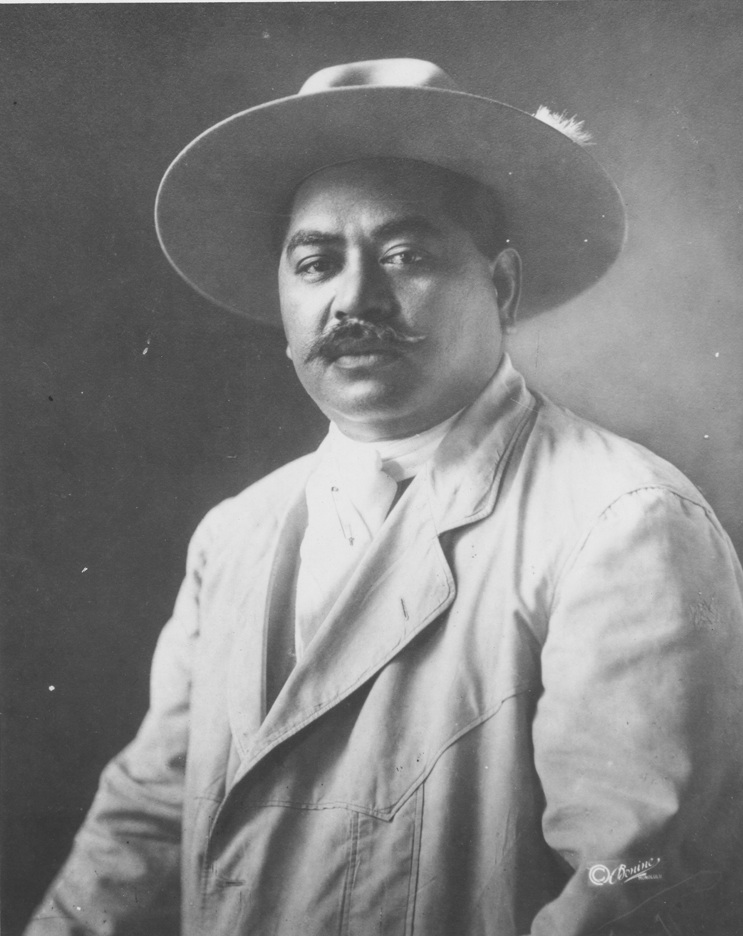
Hawaiian Prince Kūhiō, 20-year delegate to the U.S. Congress

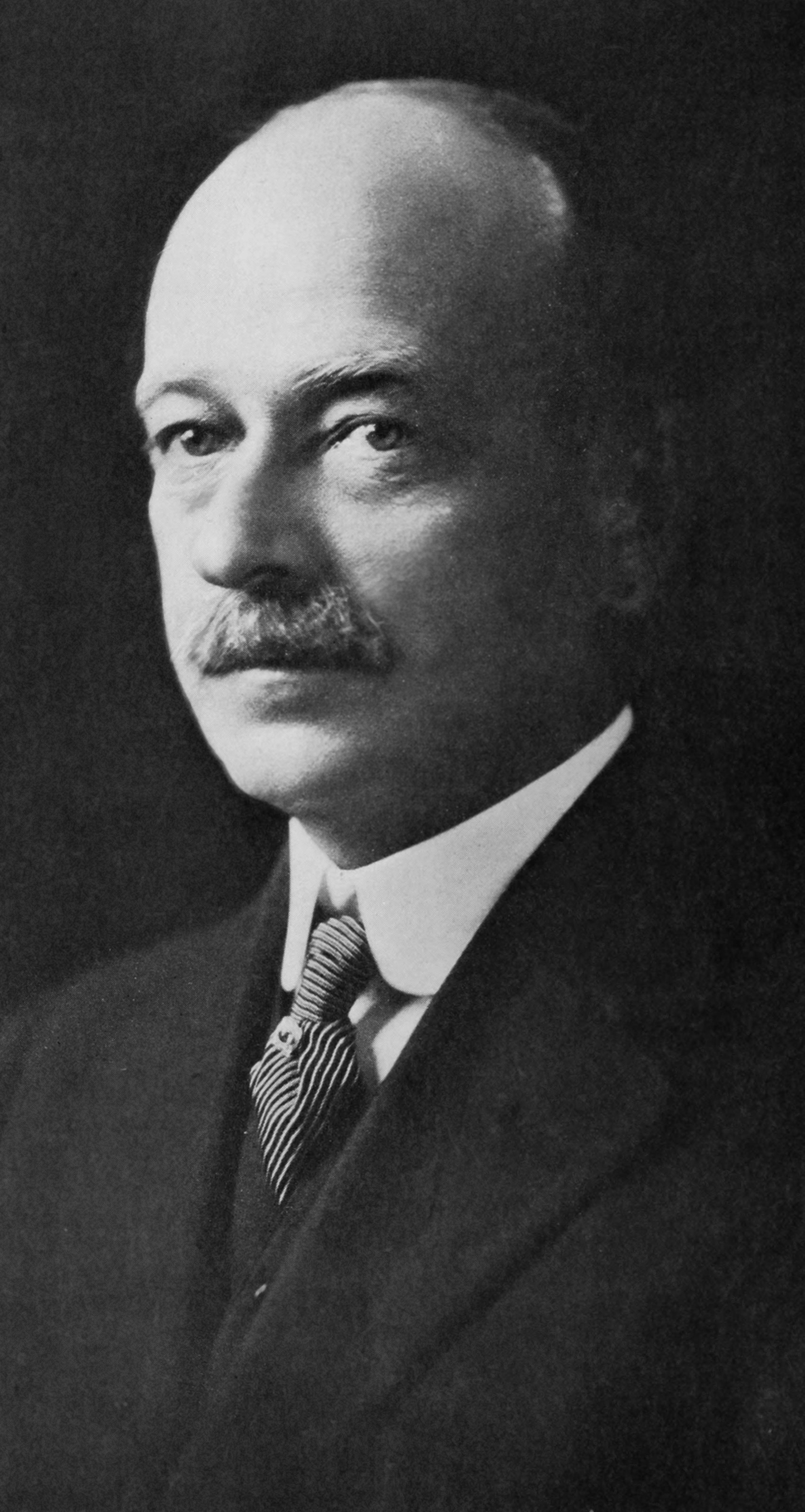
Interim Republican congressman from Hawaii, Henry Baldwin

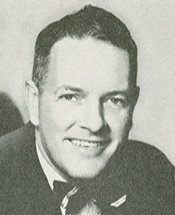
Democratic U.S. congressman from New York for 19 years, Otis Pike, Pike committee investigator of Richard Nixon

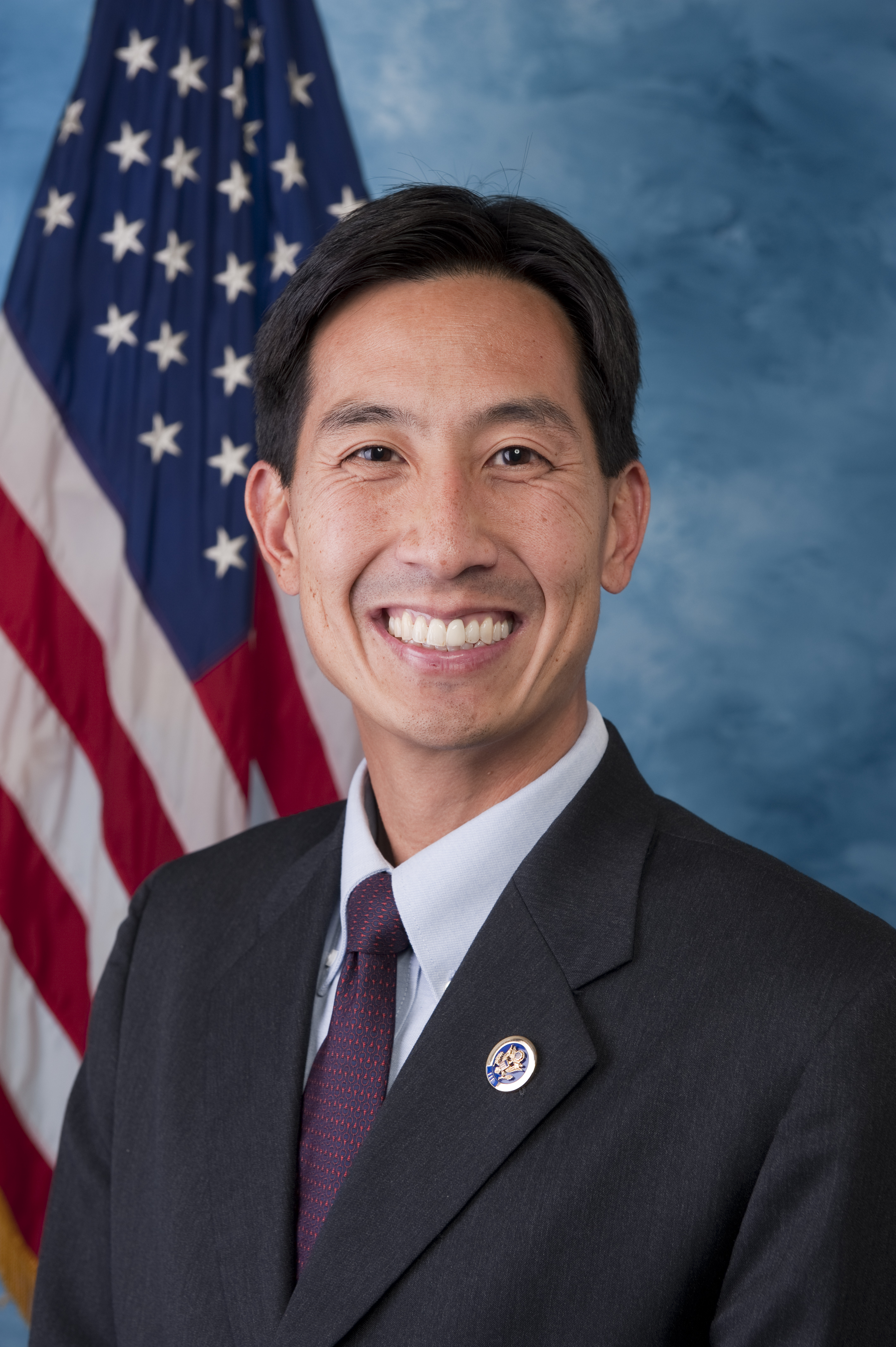
Interim Republican U.S. congressman from Hawaii in 2010, Charles Djou

- 1889 Jonah Kūhiō Kalanianaʻole (St. Matthews)—Hawaiian prince, delegate to the US House of Representatives from Hawaii 1903–22
- 1891* Henry Alexander Baldwin (MIT)—Republican delegate to US Congress from Hawaii 1921–23 (attended 1886–88)
- '15 Joseph Farrington (Wisconsin)—Republican US congressman from Hawaii 1943-54
- '39* Otis Pike (Princeton)—Democratic US congressman from New York 1961–79, decorated USMC World War II pilot, known for work on environment, Pike Committee investigations of Richard Nixon's intelligence abuses, Otis G. Pike Wilderness Area (Long Island, New York) (attended 1927–29)
- '87 Charles Djou (Penn)—Republican US congressman from Hawaii 2010-2011 (finishing Neil Abercrombie's term), and major in the Army Reserve

=== Presidential appointees ===
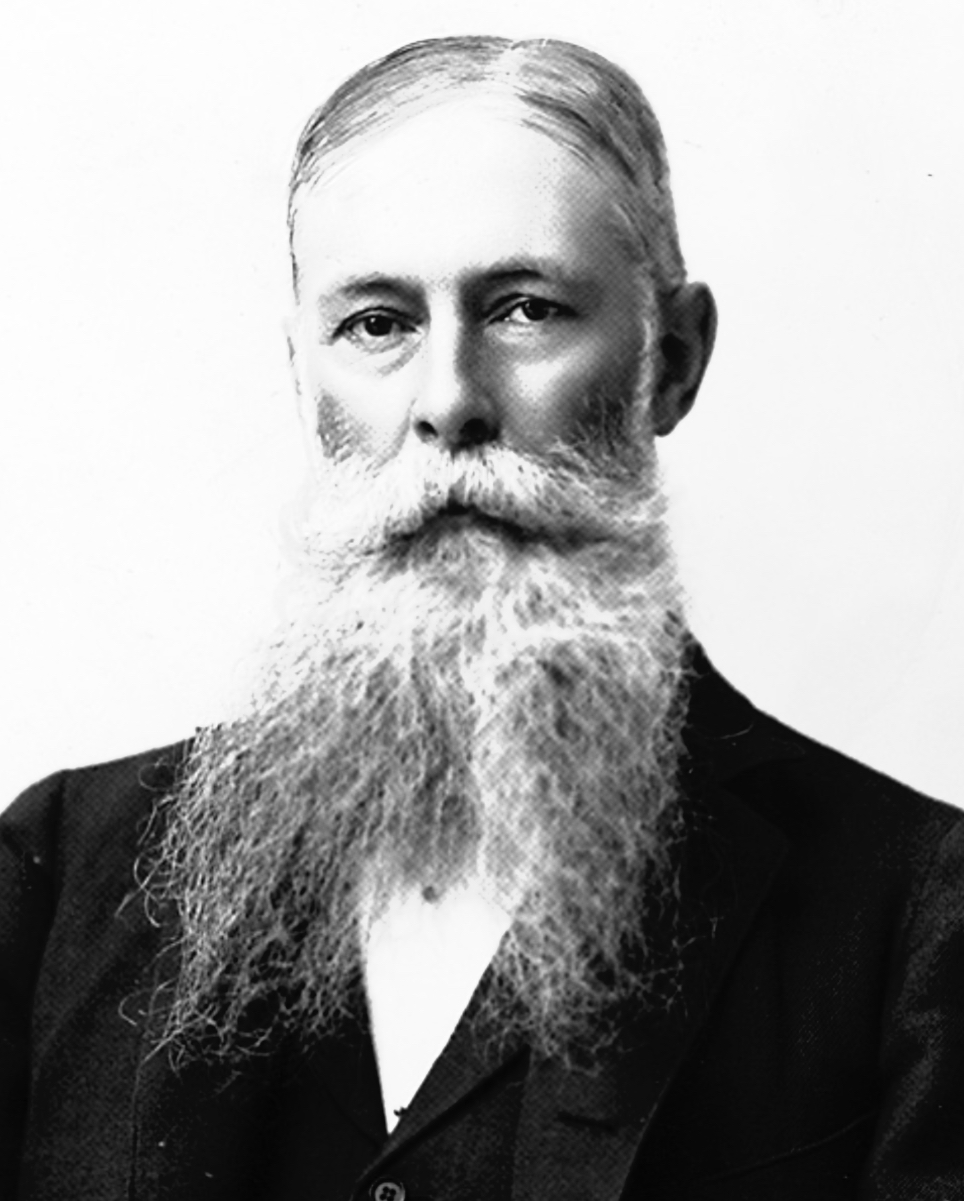
Honorable Judge Sanford Dole, first governor of Hawaii

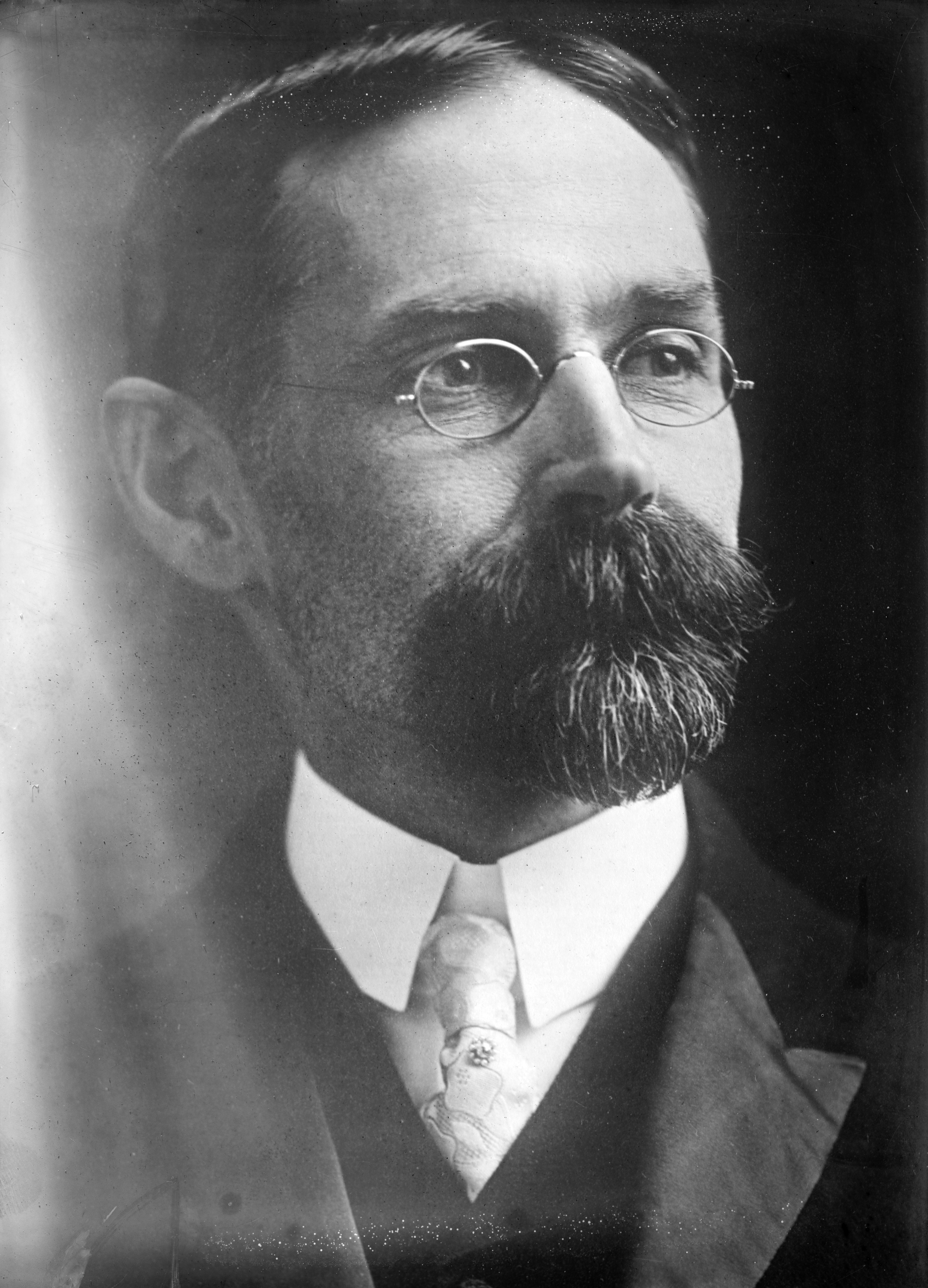
Honorable Judge Walter Frear, third governor of Hawaii

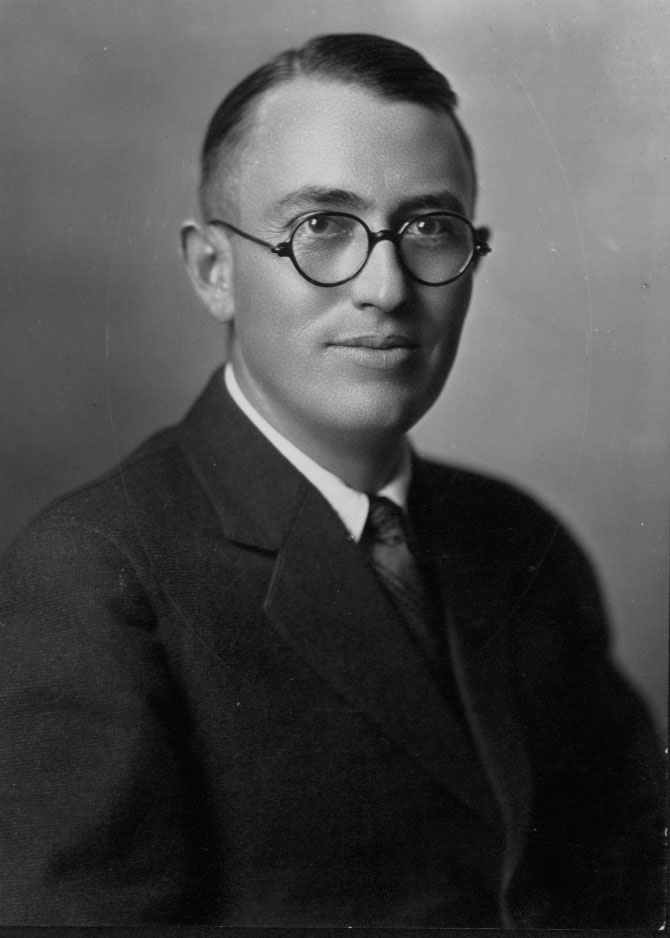
Lawrence Judd, seventh governor of Hawaii

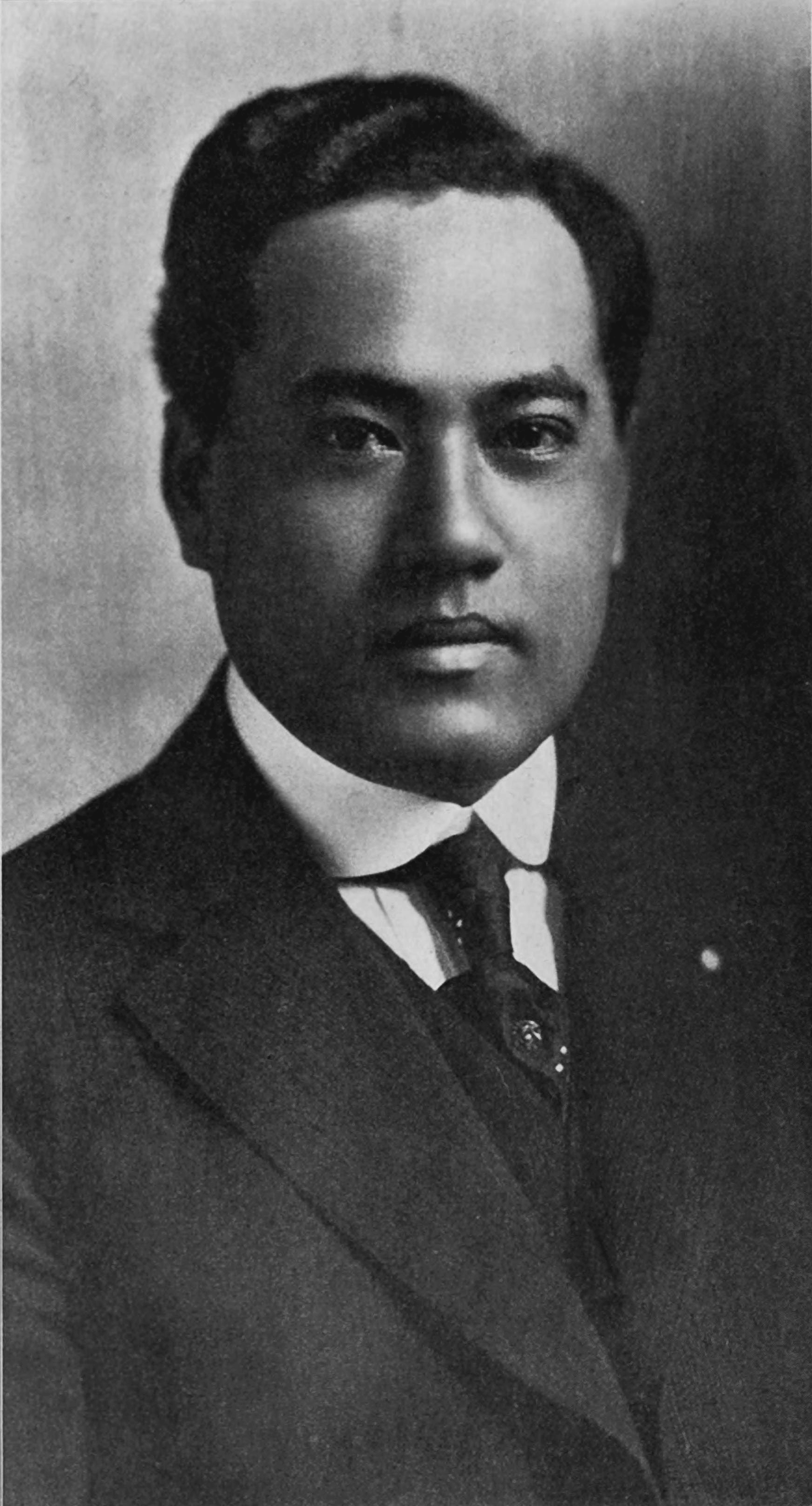
Honorable Judge William Charles Achi, Jr., territorial judge

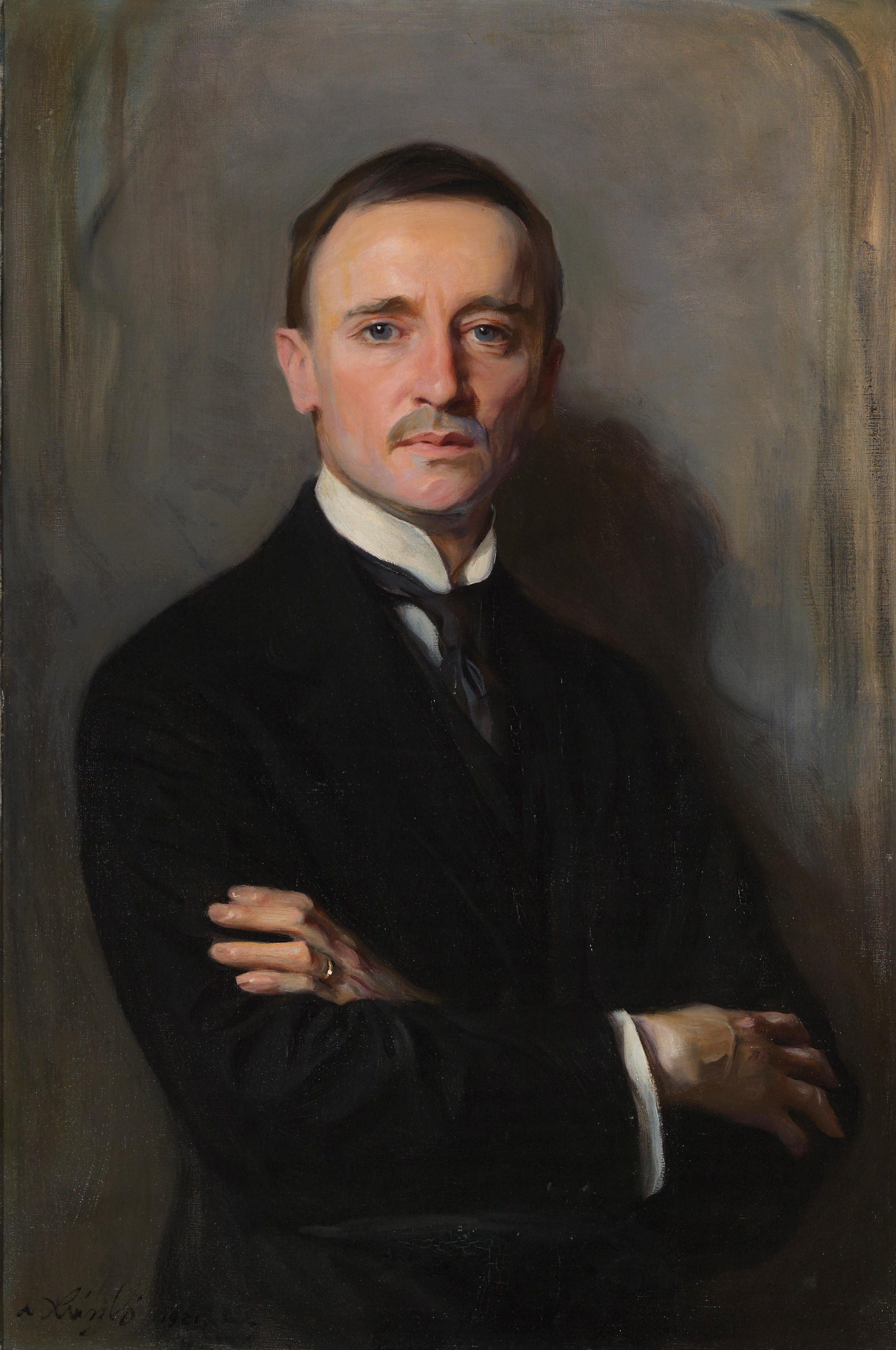
William Castle, Jr., appointee of Presidents Calvin Coolidge and Herbert Hoover

- 1864 Sanford Dole (Williams)—appointed first territorial governor of Hawaii and federal judge by William McKinley
- 1881 Walter Frear (Yale)—appointed third territorial governor of Hawaii and federal judge by Theodore Roosevelt
- 1896 William Castle, Jr. (Harvard)—assistant secretary of state and ambassador to Japan under Calvin Coolidge, undersecretary of state for Herbert Hoover, Harvard Board of Overseers
- 1905 Lawrence M. Judd (Penn)—appointed seventh territorial governor of Hawaii by Herbert Hoover
- 1908 William Charles Achi, Jr. (Stanford)—appointed territorial judge by Woodrow Wilson
- '33 Samuel Pailthorpe King (Yale)—appointed federal judge by Richard Nixon
- '47 John M. Steadman (Yale)—appointed judge of the District of Columbia Court of Appeals by Ronald Reagan
- '50 Alan Cooke Kay (Princeton)—appointed federal judge by Ronald Reagan
- '51 Elinor G. Constable (Wellesley)—US ambassador to Kenya nominated by Ronald Reagan
- '62 Wendy Lee Gramm (Wellesley)—head of Commodity Futures Trading Commission for Ronald Reagan, his "favorite economist", disgraced Enron board member, spouse of Texas Republican senator Phil Gramm
- '65 Robert G. Klein (Stanford)—justice of the Supreme Court of Hawaii, appointed a federal judge by Bill Clinton (withdrawn)
- '75 Robert S. Silberman (Dartmouth)—assistant secretary of the Army (Manpower and Reserve Affairs) for George H. W. Bush, president of CalEnergy, CEO of Strayer Education

=== Local officials, other representatives and appointees ===
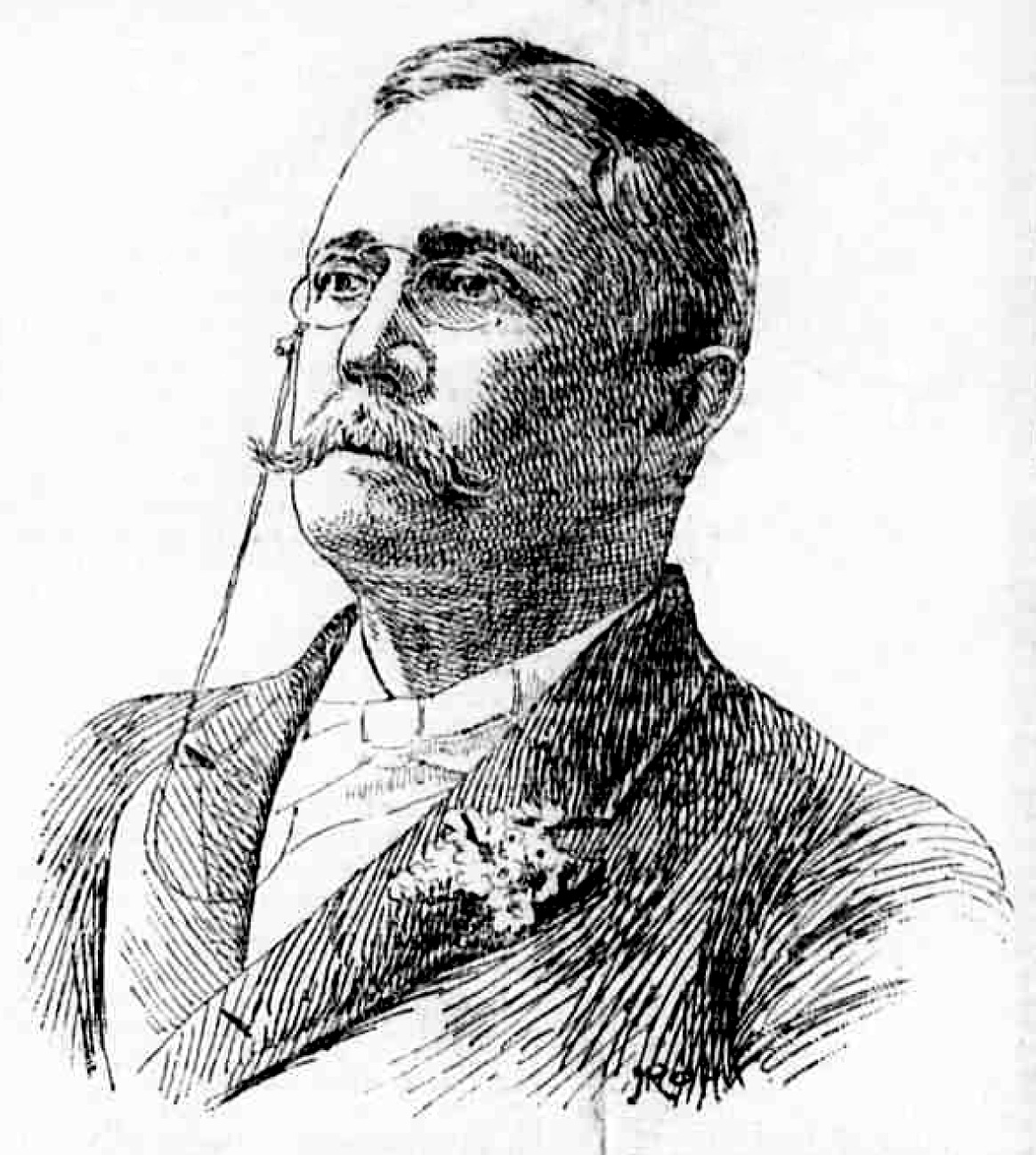
Albert Francis Judd, chief justice of the Supreme Court of Hawaii

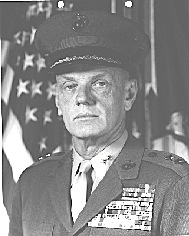
USMC major general Ross T. Dwyer, USMC aide to the secretary of the Navy

- 1858 Albert Francis Judd (Yale)—chief justice of the Supreme Court of the Kingdom of Hawaii
- '23 Rhoda Valentine Lewis (Stanford)—inaugural (1959 statehood), and first female, justice on the Supreme Court of Hawaii
- '40 Charles Marsland (Tufts)—first elected prosecuting attorney of Honolulu, who served from 1980 to 1988
- '59 Stephen Yamashiro—mayor of Hawaii County from 1992 to 2000
- '75 Mary Fairhurst (Gonzaga)—justice of Washington State Supreme Court
- '79 Laura Thielen (University of Colorado)—Hawaii Senate representative, District 25; former chair of Hawaii Department of Land and Natural Resources
- '92 Clare E. Connors (Yale)—United States attorney for the District of Hawaii

== Military leaders and officers ==
=== Army ===
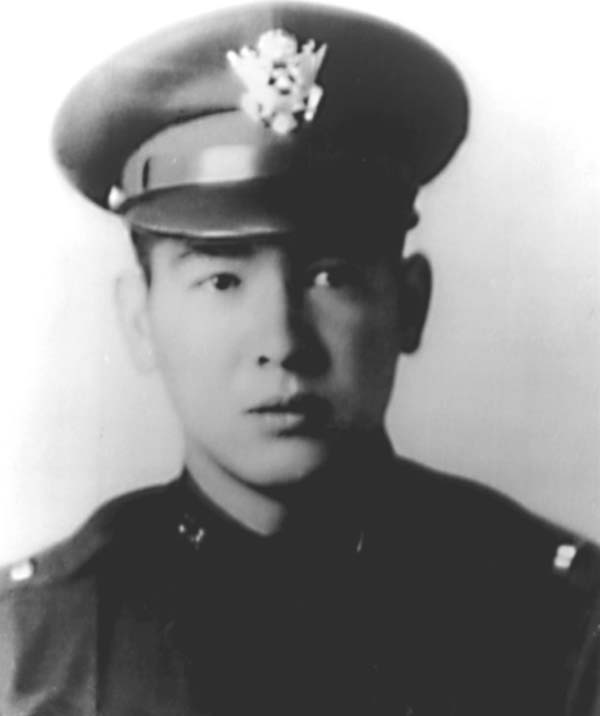
US Army Captain Francis Wai, awarded Medal of Honor in World War II

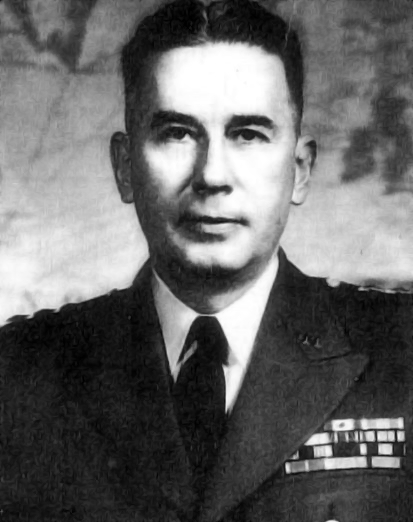
Lt General Donald Prentice Booth, commander of the Fourth US Army and High Commissioner of Okinawa

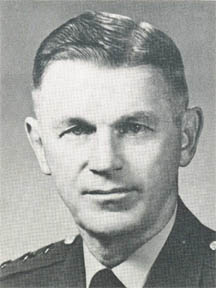
Lt General Stanley "Swede" Larsen, deputy commander, US Army, Pacific

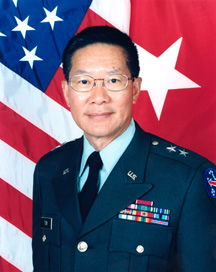
US Army Major General Stephen Tom, chief of staff, Pacific Command

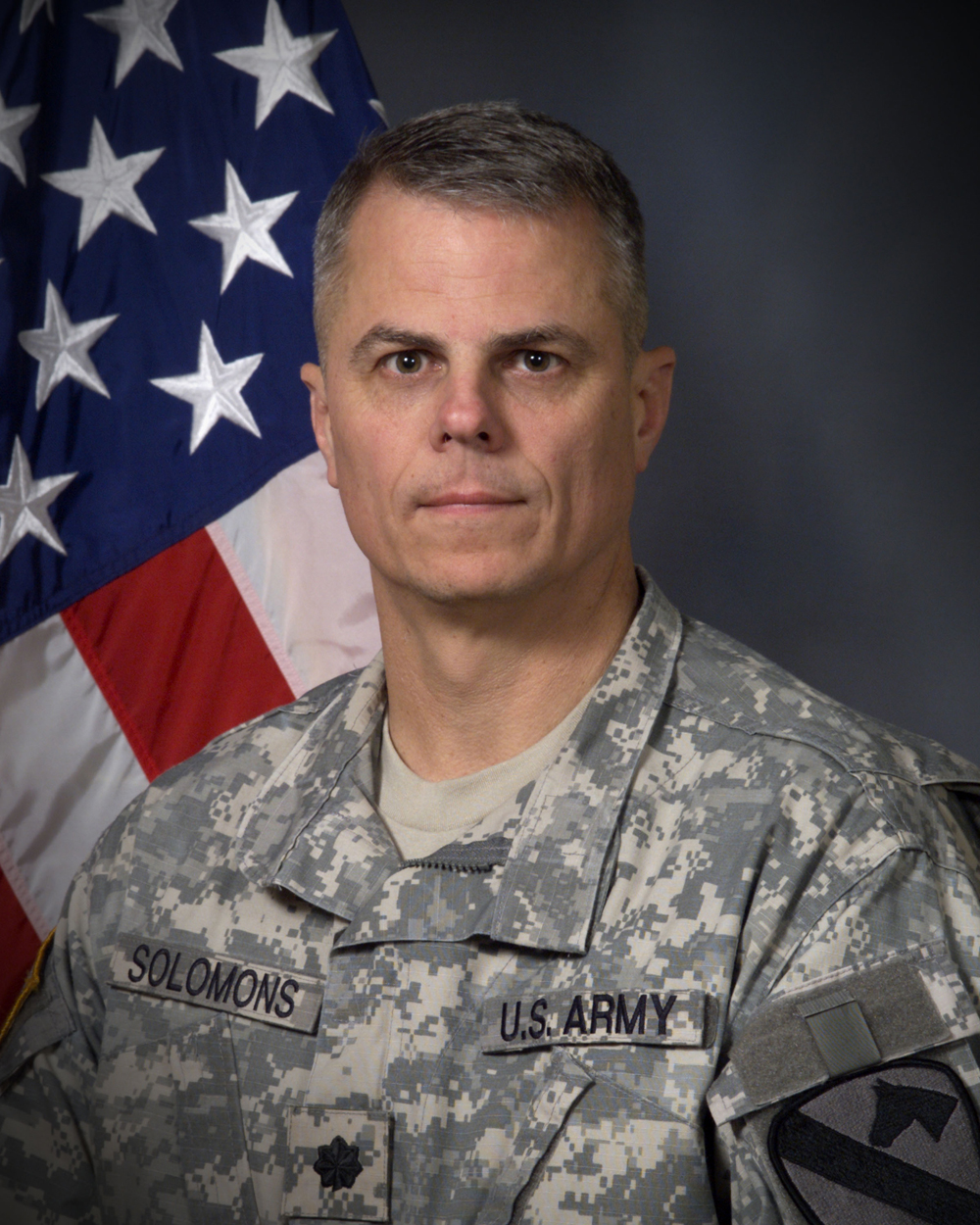
US Army Lt. Col. Mark Solomons '79

- '05 Paul Withington (Harvard)—MD in World War I, Silver Star, Legion of Merit, and French Croix de guerre, U Wisconsin football coach and college quarterback
- '20* Russell "Red" Reeder, Jr. (West Point)—colonel and regiment leader at Utah Beach on D-Day, Distinguished Service Cross, West Point Distinguished Graduate, 35 books including The Long Gray Line (ghost writer), Born at Reveille (autobiography), and the "Clint Lane" stories (attended 1916–17)
- '22* Donald Prentice Booth (West Point)—High Commissioner of Okinawa 1958–61, lieutenant general, commander of Fourth United States Army, commander of Persian Gulf Command, buried at Arlington National Cemetery (attended 1912–17)
- '35 Francis B. Wai (UCLA)—captain in World War II, posthumous Medal of Honor for actions in Battle of Leyte
- '38 Thurston Twigg-Smith (Yale)—lieutenant colonel in National Guard Artillery, Bronze Star, leading critic of Hawaiian sovereignty movement
- '42* George Patton IV (West Point)—major general, Distinguished Service Cross, Silver Star, Legion of Merit, served in Korean War and Vietnam War, son of General George S. Patton (attended 1935–37)

=== Navy ===
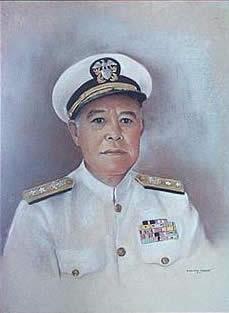
US Navy Rear Admiral Gordon Chung-Hoon

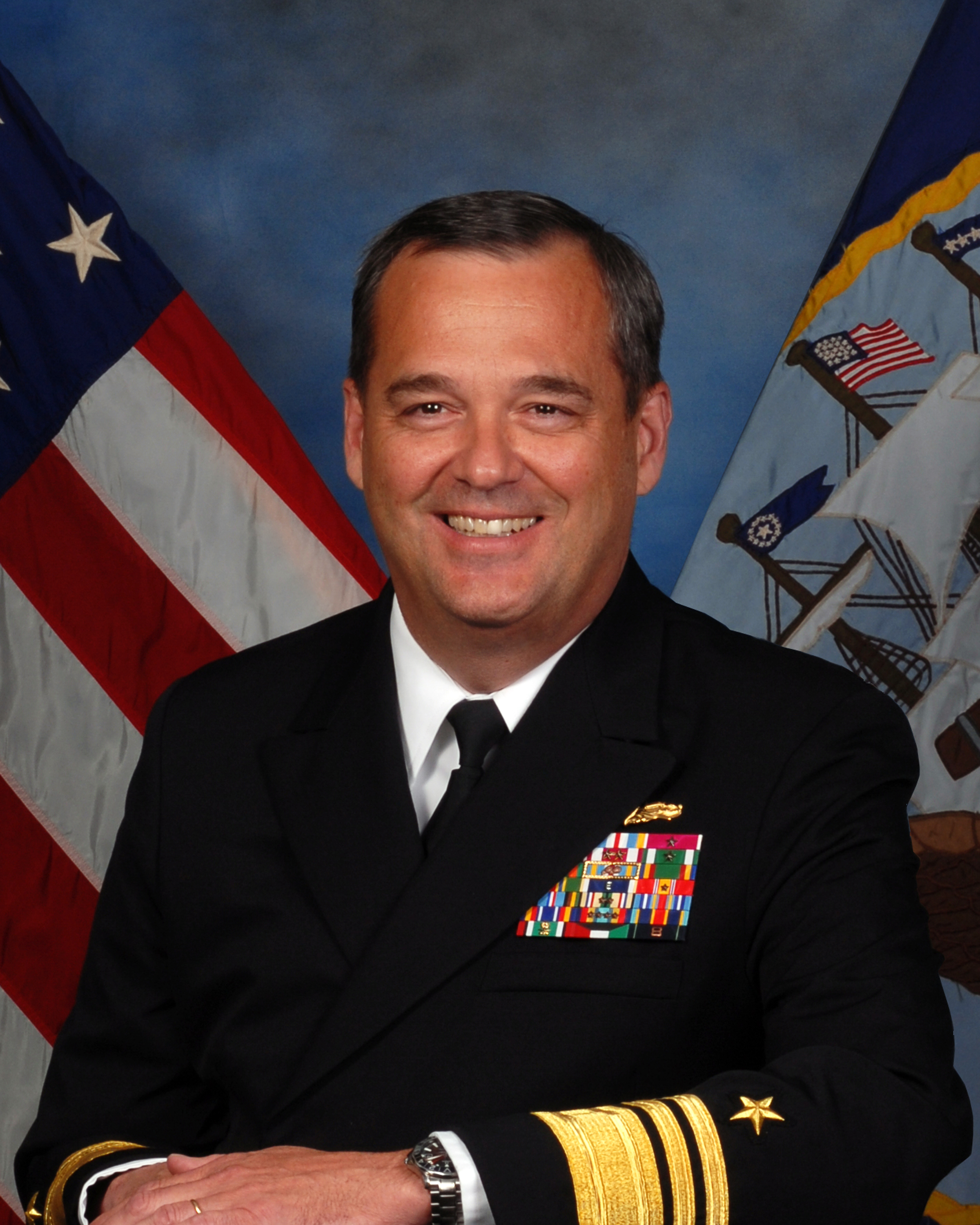
US Navy Vice Admiral Tom Copeman

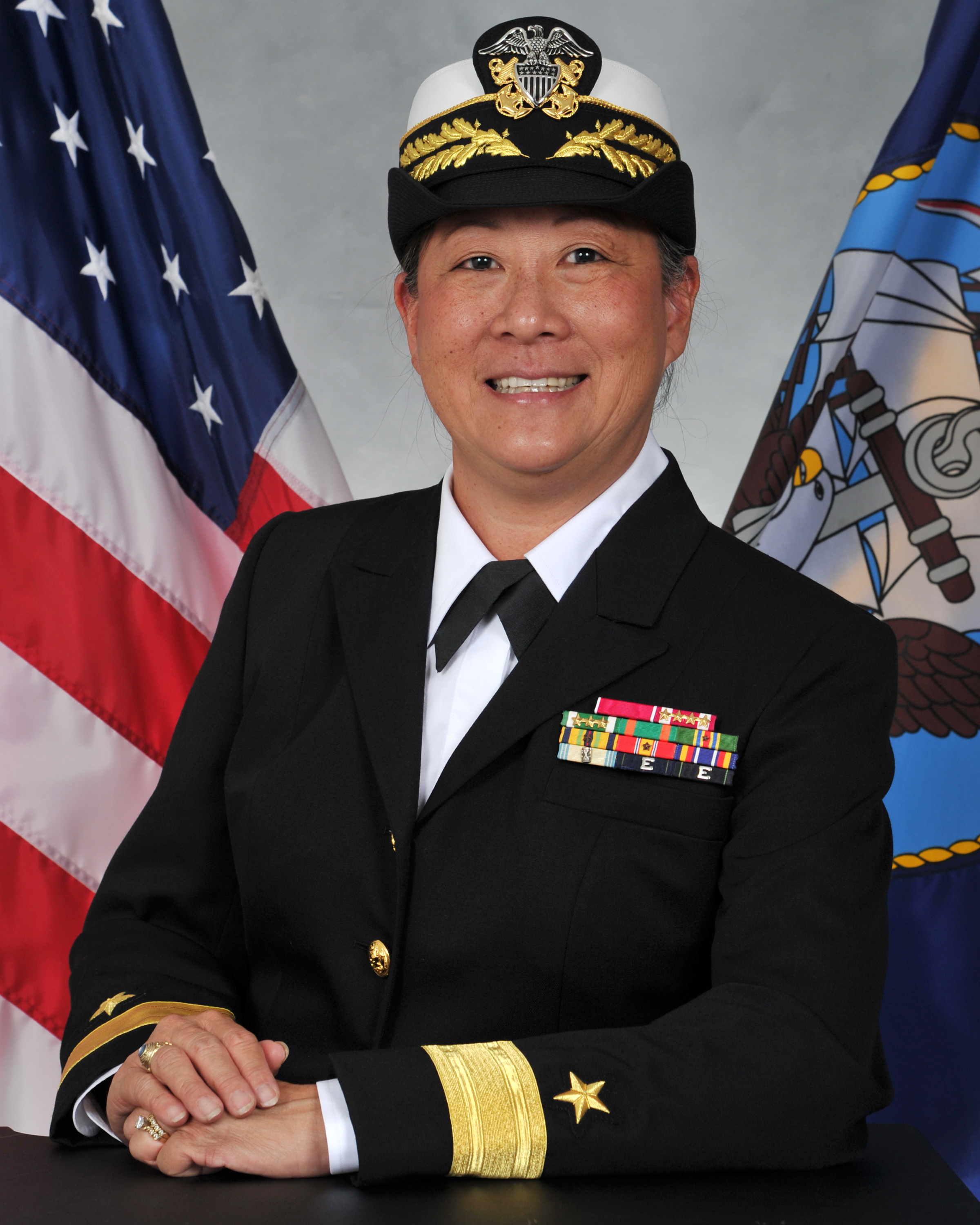
US Navy Rear Admiral Alma Grocki

- '29* Gordon Chung-Hoon (Annapolis)—rear admiral, USS Arizona (BB-39) survivor, commanded World War II destroyer USS Sigsbee, Silver Star and Navy Cross, destroyer USS Chung-Hoon, Sports Illustrated featured football star (attended 1923–28)
- '77 Thomas H. Copeman III (Creighton)—rear admiral, commanded USS Benfold, Deputy Chief of Staff for Operations, Training, and Readiness, appointed to reform the internment camp at Guantanamo Bay
- '77 Alma M. Grocki (Annapolis)—admiral, member of the 2nd class at the Naval Academy to admit women

=== Marines ===
- '37 Ross T. Dwyer (Stanford)—major general, commanded 1st Marine Division and I Marine Amphibious Force, USMC Aide to Secretary of the Navy, Distinguished Service Medal, Legion of Merit, Bronze Star

=== Air Force ===
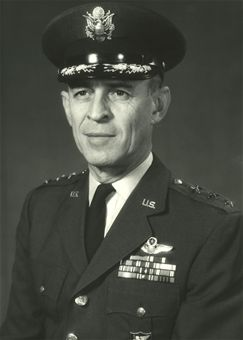
Lieutenant General Ben Webster, NATO AIRSOUTH commander

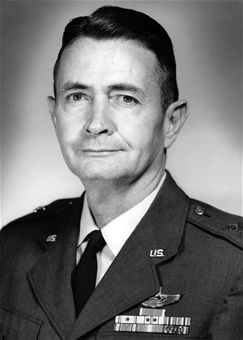
Brigadier General C.B. Stewart, Ph.D. in nuclear physics

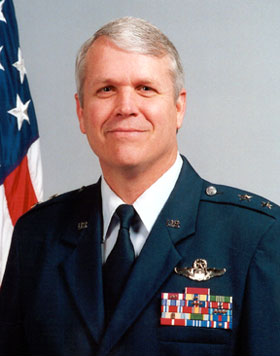
Air National Guard major general Gregory B. Gardner

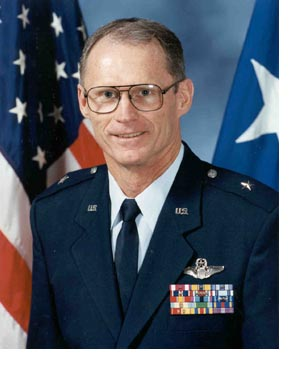
Air National Guard major general Michael H. Tice

- '66* Gregory S. Martin (Air Force Academy)—general and commander at Wright-Patterson AFB, commander of Allied Airforces, Northern Europe (AIRNORTH); Defense Distinguished Service Medal, Distinguished Service Medal, Defense Superior Service Medal, Legion of Merit, Distinguished Flying Cross (attended 1962–65)

== Entertainment ==
=== Musicians and composers ===
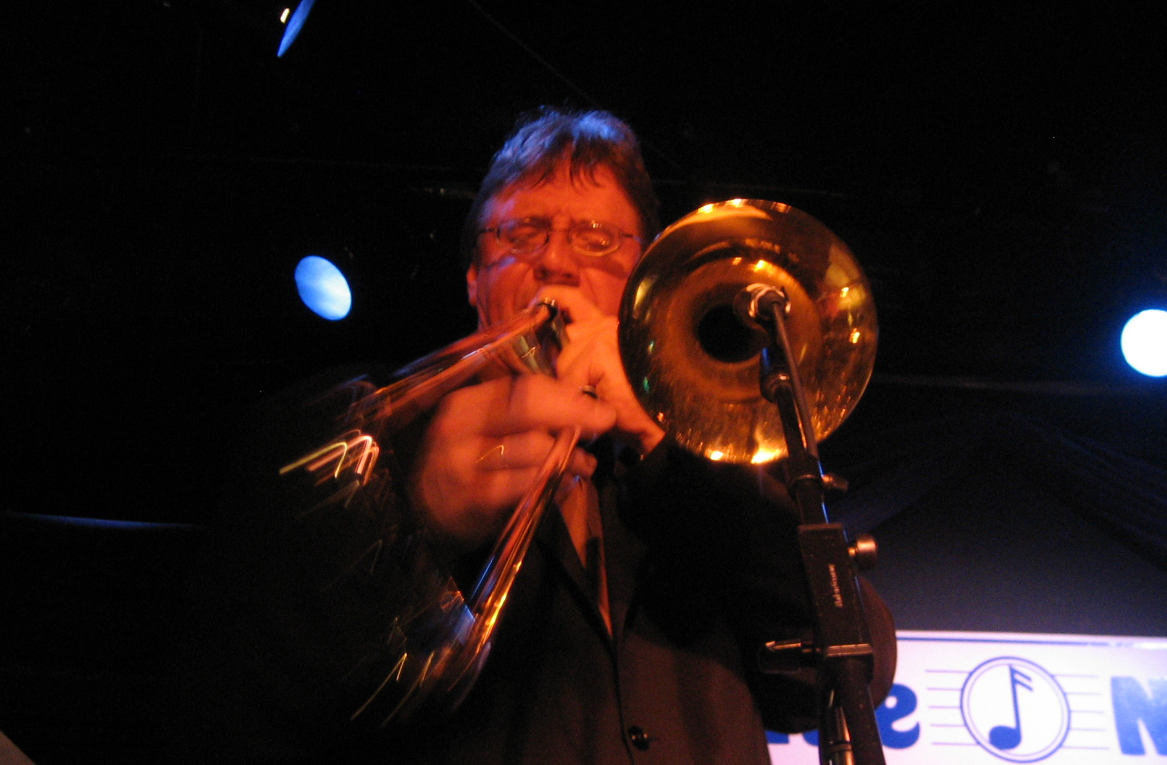
Conrad Herwig, Down Beat's 3-time #1 jazz trombonist

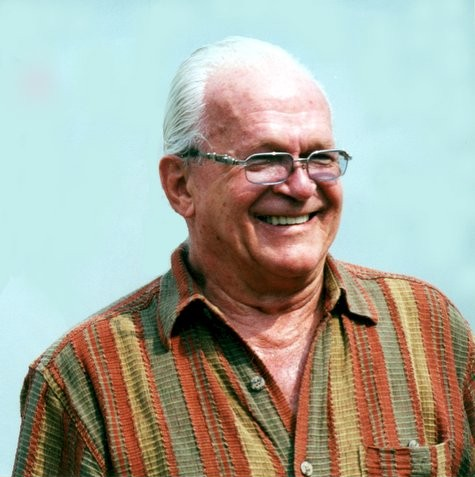
Bob Shane, Grammy Award-winning Kingston Trio guitarist

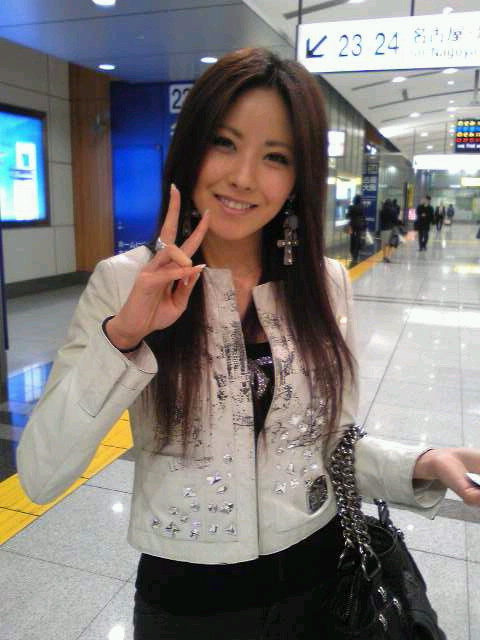
melody., J-pop 3-time top-10 artist

- '12 Robert Alexander Anderson (Cornell)—World War I downed pilot, subject of film The Dawn Patrol, composer of Hawaiian standards "Mele Kalikimaka", "Lovely Hula Hands"
- '52* Dave Guard (Stanford)—Kingston Trio founder (attended 1946–51)
- '52 Bob Shane (Menlo)—Kingston Trio founding guitarist
- '59 Robin Luke (Pepperdine)—early rockabilly singer, Rockabilly Hall of Fame, "Susie Darlin'" was a No. 5 hit, then Professor and Head of Marketing, Southwest Missouri State University
- '62 Bruce Broughton—film composer (Silverado, Tombstone, The Rescuers Down Under) and 10-time Emmy-winner for TV themes (JAG, Tiny Toon Adventures) and series (Hawaii Five-O, Dallas, How the West Was Won)
- '77 Conrad Herwig (N Texas State)—Grammy Award-nominated jazz trombonist, recorded 17 albums as leader, professor of Jazz at Rutgers
- '00 melody.—Japanese pop artist with three top ten albums
- '00 Yasmeen Sulieman—recording artist with two top-100 R&B hits

=== Broadway, stage, and dance performers ===
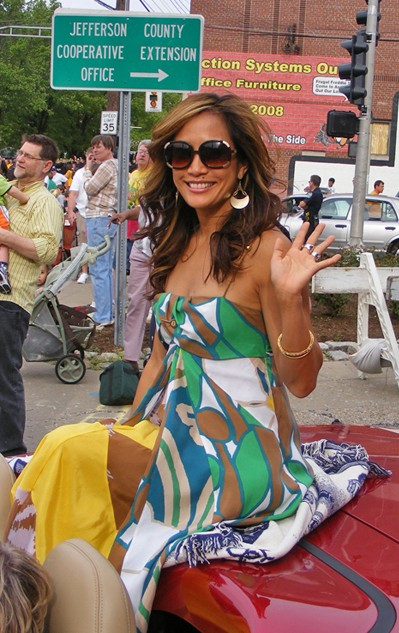
Carrie Ann Inaba, dancer, choreographer, and reality show judge

- '33* Jean Erdman (Sarah Lawrence)—one of Martha Graham's first dancers, founded her own NYC dance company; spouse of religion and mythology author Joseph Campbell (attended 1921–32)
- '68 Rap Reiplinger—Emmy-winning comedian
- '81 Ann Harada (Brown)—original cast main actress, Tony Award-winning Avenue Q
- '86 Carrie Ann Inaba (Irvine)—choreographer and judge, Dancing with the Stars, actress, Austin Powers in Goldmember, Flygirl dancer on In Living Color
- '87 Rachel Factor, née Christine Horii (Colorado)—Broadway actress, Rockettes dancer, one person show JAP
- '96 Amanda Schull (Indiana)—lead actress in Center Stage, dancer for San Francisco Ballet

=== TV and film performers ===
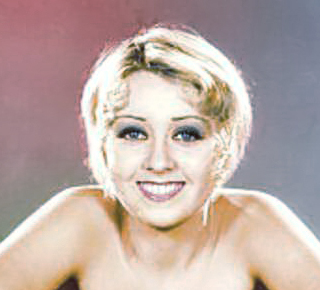
Oscar nominee Joan Blondell

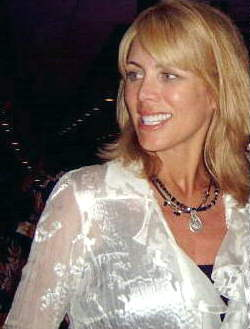
Actress and singer Teri Ann Linn

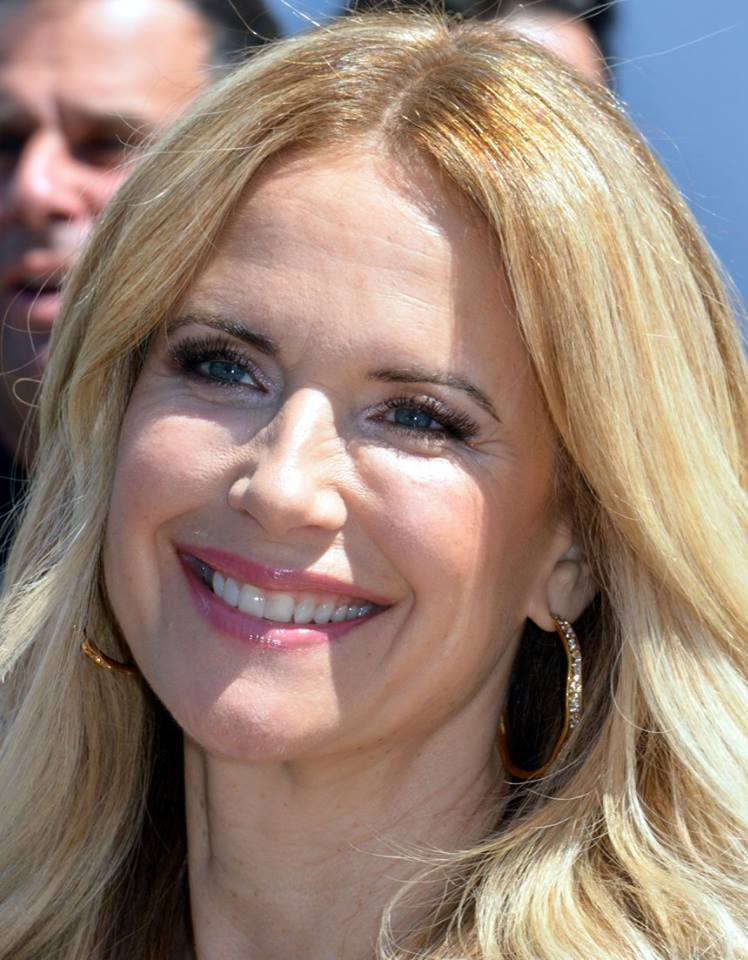
Leading actress Kelly Preston

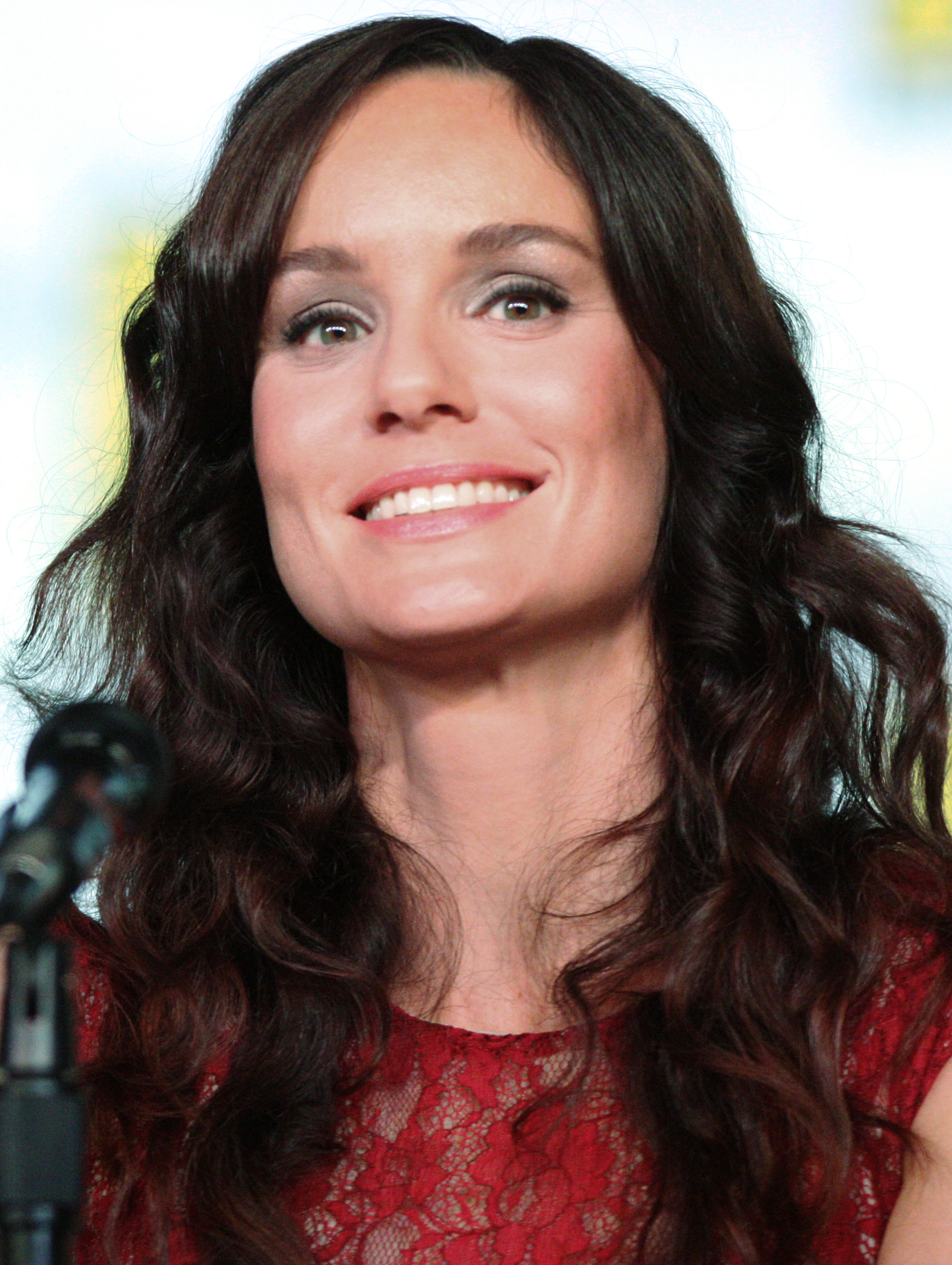
Actress Sarah Wayne Callies

- '25* Joan Blondell (North Texas)—leading actress for 52 years in films and on stage, Hollywood Walk of Fame star, nominated for Academy Award best supporting actress in 1951 (attended 1914–15)
- '27 Buster Crabbe (USC)—athlete and leading actor, Tarzan, Flash Gordon, and Buck Rogers 1933-50
- '54 Al Harrington (Stanford)—athlete and actor, Hawaii Five-O
- '66 Susan Blakely (UTEP)—winner of Hollywood Foreign Press Association Golden Globe Award 1976 Best Dramatic Actress Rich Man, Poor Man, twice nominated for the Emmy Award as Best Dramatic Actress, 1976–77, Rich Man, Poor Man
- '66 Gerry Lopez (UH)—surfer and main actor, Subotai in Conan the Barbarian
- '79 Teri Ann Linn (Pepperdine)—Miss Hawaii 1981, singer and main actress, Kristen Forrester Dominguez in The Bold and the Beautiful, gold CD Teri on the European charts
- '80 Kelly Preston, née Kelly Smith (also Kelly Palzis)—leading actress, 50+ films including For Love of the Game, Jerry Maguire, Addicted to Love, Twins, Only You, Waiting to Exhale; spouse of actor John Travolta
- '82 Scott Coffey—actor, Tank Girl, Mulholland Drive, Ferris Bueller's Day Off, Wayne's World 2, male lead in Shag
- '91 Matt Corboy (Colorado State)—actor, The Shield, The Descendants
- '95 Sarah Wayne Callies (Dartmouth)—actress, female lead in Prison Break, female lead in The Walking Dead
- '96 Amanda Schull (Indiana)—actress, One Tree Hill, Suits, Pretty Little Liars, and 12 Monkeys
- '01 Jason Tam—actor, Markko Rivera on One Life to Live and Beyond the Break
- '06 Asia Ray Smith—actress, Sierra Hoffman on The Young and the Restless

=== Other entertainment industry producers ===
- '35* Buck Henshaw (Stanford)—set decorator 1950–1987, The George Burns and Gracie Allen Show, The Twilight Zone, Black Widow (attended 1925–34)
- '38 John Kneubuhl (Yale)—writer for Wild, Wild, West, Star Trek, Mannix, The Fugitive, Hawaii Five-O, Ironside, Gunsmoke, Wagon Train
- '53 Allan Burns (Oregon)—6-time Emmy Award-winning writer and creator 1961–96, The Munsters, Get Smart, Mary Tyler Moore Show, Rocky and Bullwinkle, and the Cap'n Crunch cereal character, animator of George of the Jungle, nominated for Oscar
- '69 Edgy Lee (SF Art)—independent filmmaker

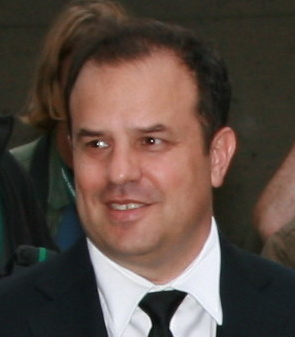
Film director and TV series creator Rod Lurie

- '78 Don King (Stanford)—surfing photographer and cinematographer
- '80 Rod Lurie (West Point)—creator of Commander in Chief, Line of Fire, portraying the first Jewish U.S. president and the first woman U.S. President
- '80* Kevin McCollum (Cincinnati)—Broadway producer of Tony Award-winning Rent and Avenue Q, owner of production company claiming five Tony Awards, thirteen nominations, and Pulitzer Prize for Drama (attended 1971–76)
- '83* Iris Yamashita (UCSD)—nominated for best original screenplay for Letters from Iwo Jima (attended 1974–1976)
- '85 Scott Moore (Colorado)—nominated for BAFTA Award for best original screenplay for The Hangover, co-wrote and -directed Bad Moms
- '88 Albert Cheng—Emmy award for ABC streaming video internet site
- '92 Kathleen Man Gyllenhaal (Yale)—Filmmaker, award-winning director of several documentaries, co-producer of Grassroots
- '94 Kaui Hart Hemmings (Colorado)—writer of The Descendants
- '97 David Nakayama—concept and comic book artist

== Business leaders and philanthropists ==
=== Major philanthropists ===
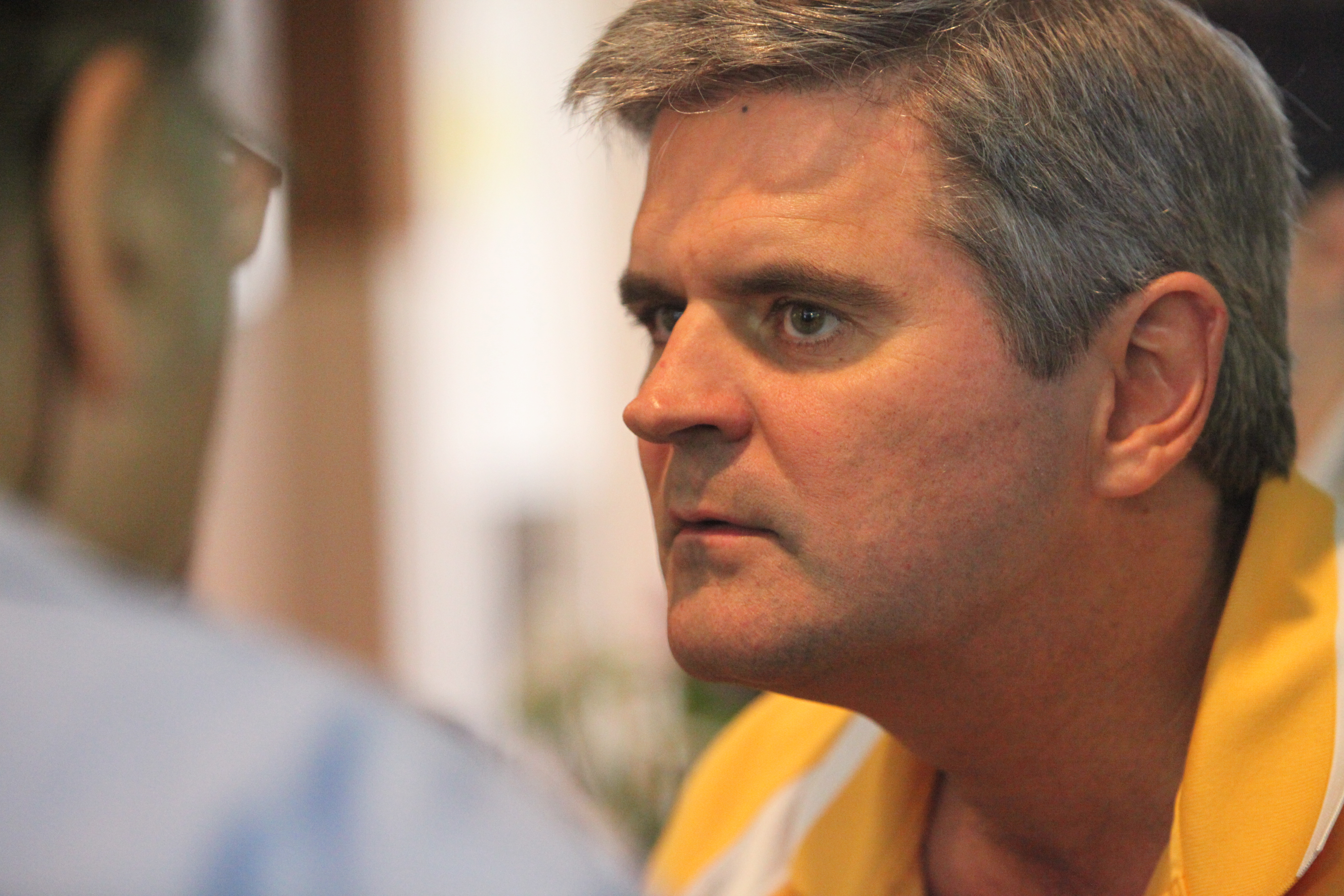
AOL co-founder and philanthropist Steve Case

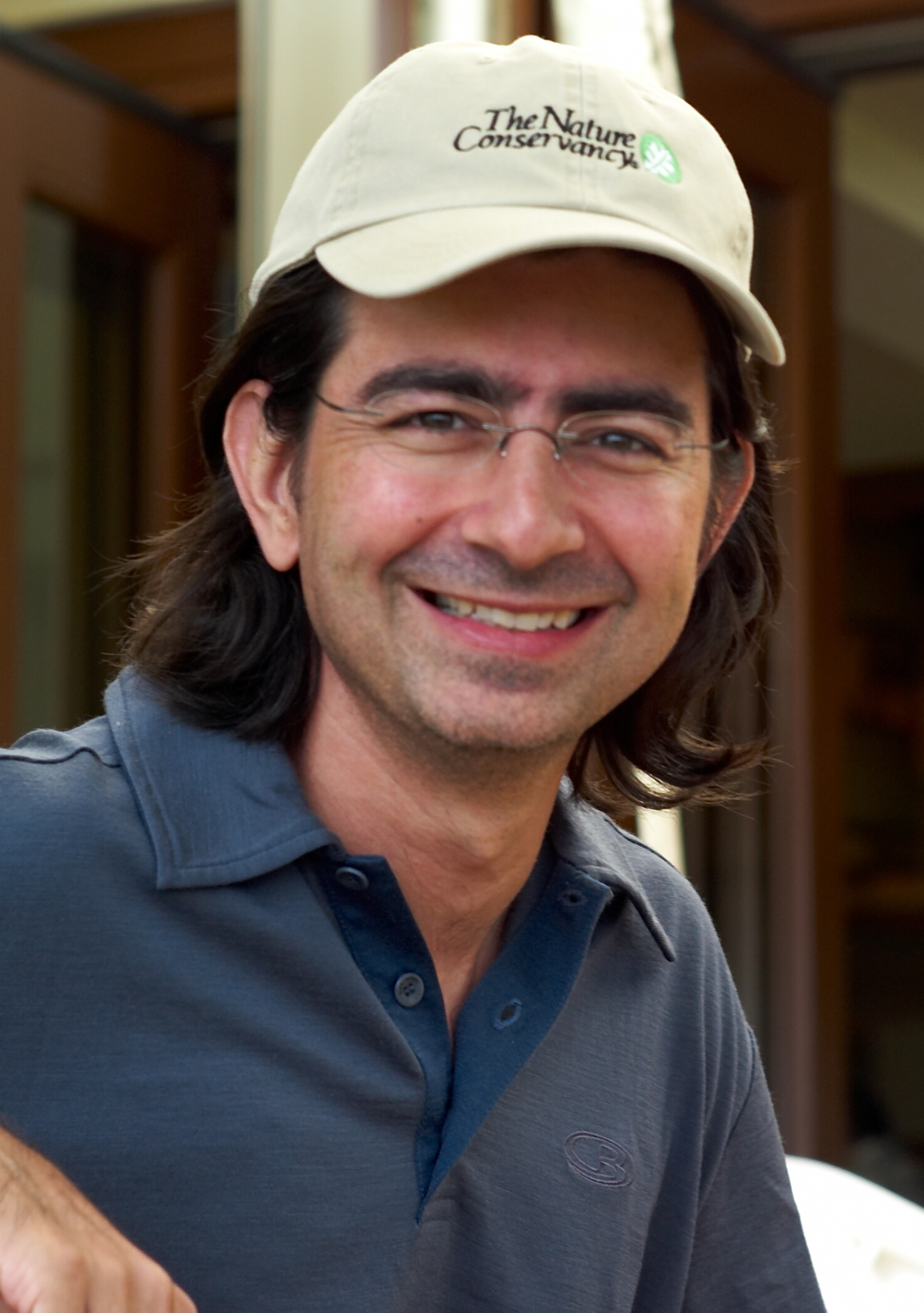
eBay founder and philanthropist Pierre Omidyar

- '39 Charles Gates, Jr. (MIT)—owner of Gates Rubber Company and Gates Corporation (owner of Learjet), often listed on Forbes 400, e.g., #186 in 1999, #209 in 2002, #222 in 2003, philanthropist through Gates Family Foundation ($147M over 60 years)
- '65* James C. Kennedy (Denver)—director of Cox Enterprises and principal heir of the Barbara Cox Anthony estate, #49 in 2008 on Forbes 400, Atlanta philanthropist of the year 2003, conservation and education donor (attended '55–61)
- '76 Steve Case (Williams)—co-founder and CEO of America Online and philanthropist, America's #19 most generous donor in 1999 according to Chronicle of Philanthropy ($40M in 1999), appointed to the Presidential Council on Jobs and Competitiveness
- '84* Pierre Omidyar (Tufts)—founder of eBay and philanthropist, America's #20 in 2002, #13 in 2003, #7 in 2004, #9 in 2005, and #29 most-generous donor in 2006 according to Chronicle of Philanthropy ($403M, 2002–06), appointed to the Presidential Commission on White House Fellows (attended '79-81)

=== Other founders and CEOs ===
- '67 Jeff Hakman—world surfing champion and founder of Quiksilver in the U.S. and in Europe

== Cultural notables ==
=== Authors, editors, and journalists ===
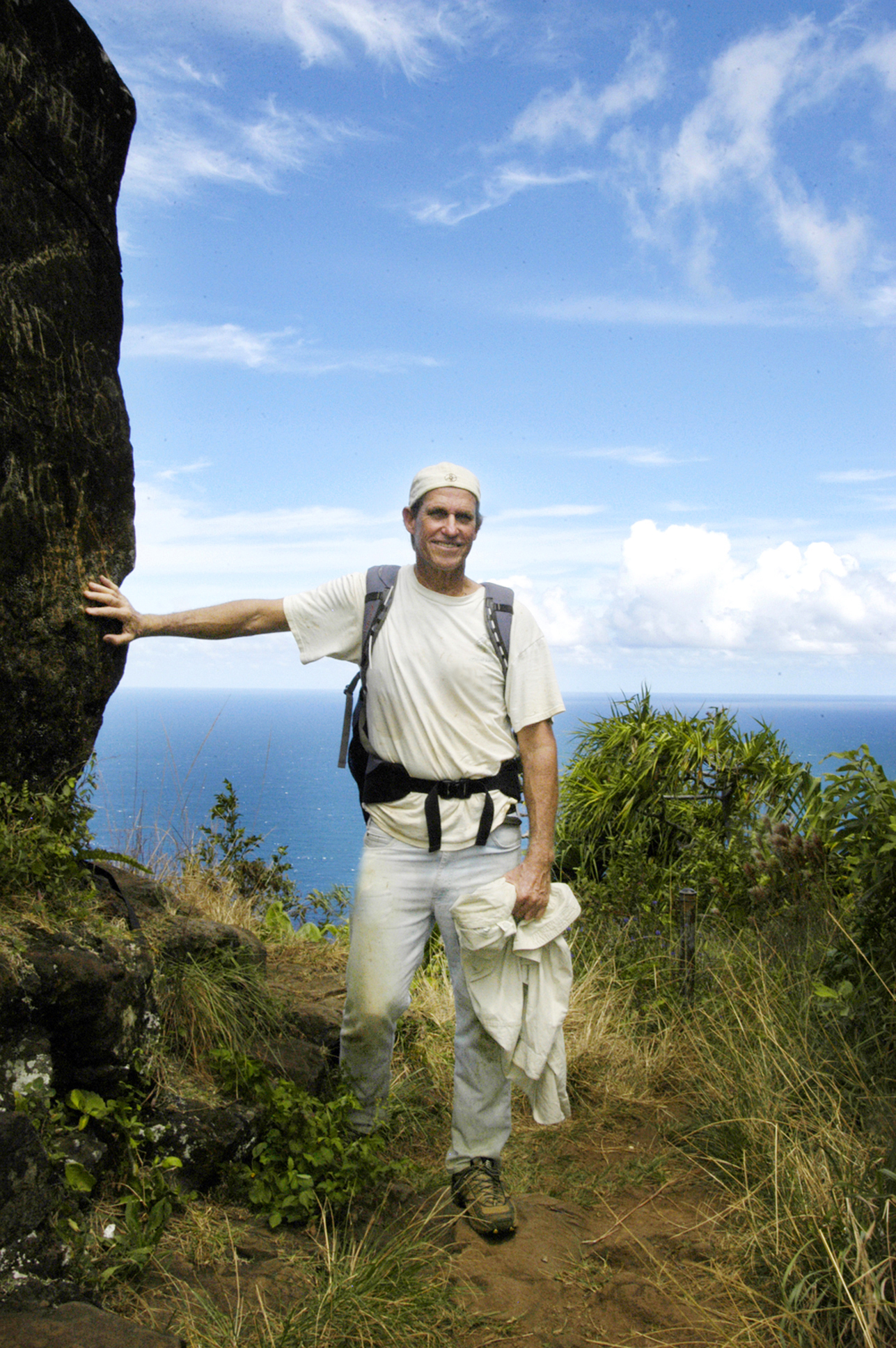
David Boynton, prolific naturalist photographer

- '10 William Whitmore Goodale Moir (Cornell)—botanist, agricultural technologist, author of multiple books about orchids
- '63 David Boynton (UCSB)—photographer, naturalist, educator and author of Kauai Days, Kauai, NaPali: Images of Kauai's Northwest Shore, and several other photographic essays about Hawaii
- '63 Susanna Moore—author of My Old Sweetheart, The Whiteness of Bones, Sleeping Beauties, In The Cut, One Last Look, I Myself Have Seen It: The Myth of Hawai'i, The Big Girls, The Life of Objects
- '65 Kathleen Norris (Bennington)—best-selling Christian spiritual poet and essayist, Dakota: A Spiritual Geography
- '71 Richard H.P. Sia (Harvard)—associate editor, International Consortium of Investigative Journalists; senior editor, managing editor of National Journal; former defense correspondent at the Baltimore Sun
- '73 Kirby Wright (UCSD)—author of Punahou Blues, Moloka'i Nui Ahina: Summers on the Lonely Isle, Sorrow Town: Selected Stories, The End, My Friend: Prelude to the Apocalypse , Square Dancing at the Asylum: Nouveau Noir Flash Fiction, and The Queen of Moloka'i: Book 1
- '83 Nora Okja Keller (Hawaii)—Pushcart Prize, 1995, for "Mother Tongue", from Comfort Woman; American Book Award, 1998
- '85 Allegra Goodman (Harvard)—author of award-winning The Family Markowitz
- '91 Nancy Cordes, née Weiner (Penn)—CBS and ABC NY and Washington, D.C. news correspondent
- '92 Hanya Yanagihara (Smith)—author, writer, journalist
- '98 Emily Chang (Harvard University)—broadcast journalist

=== Other cultural notables ===
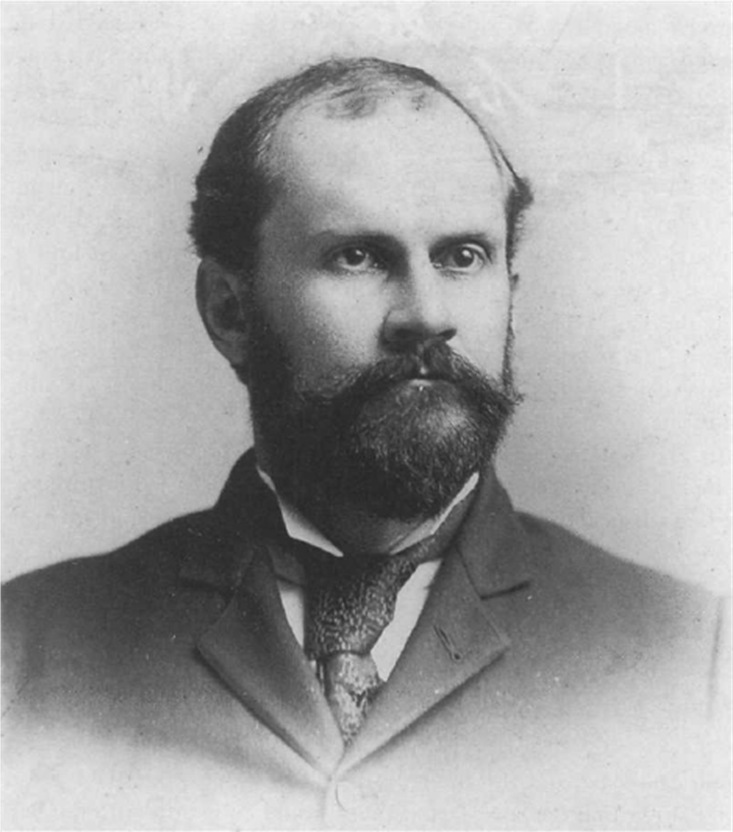
Lorrin A. Thurston, early baseball player and anti-monarchy politician

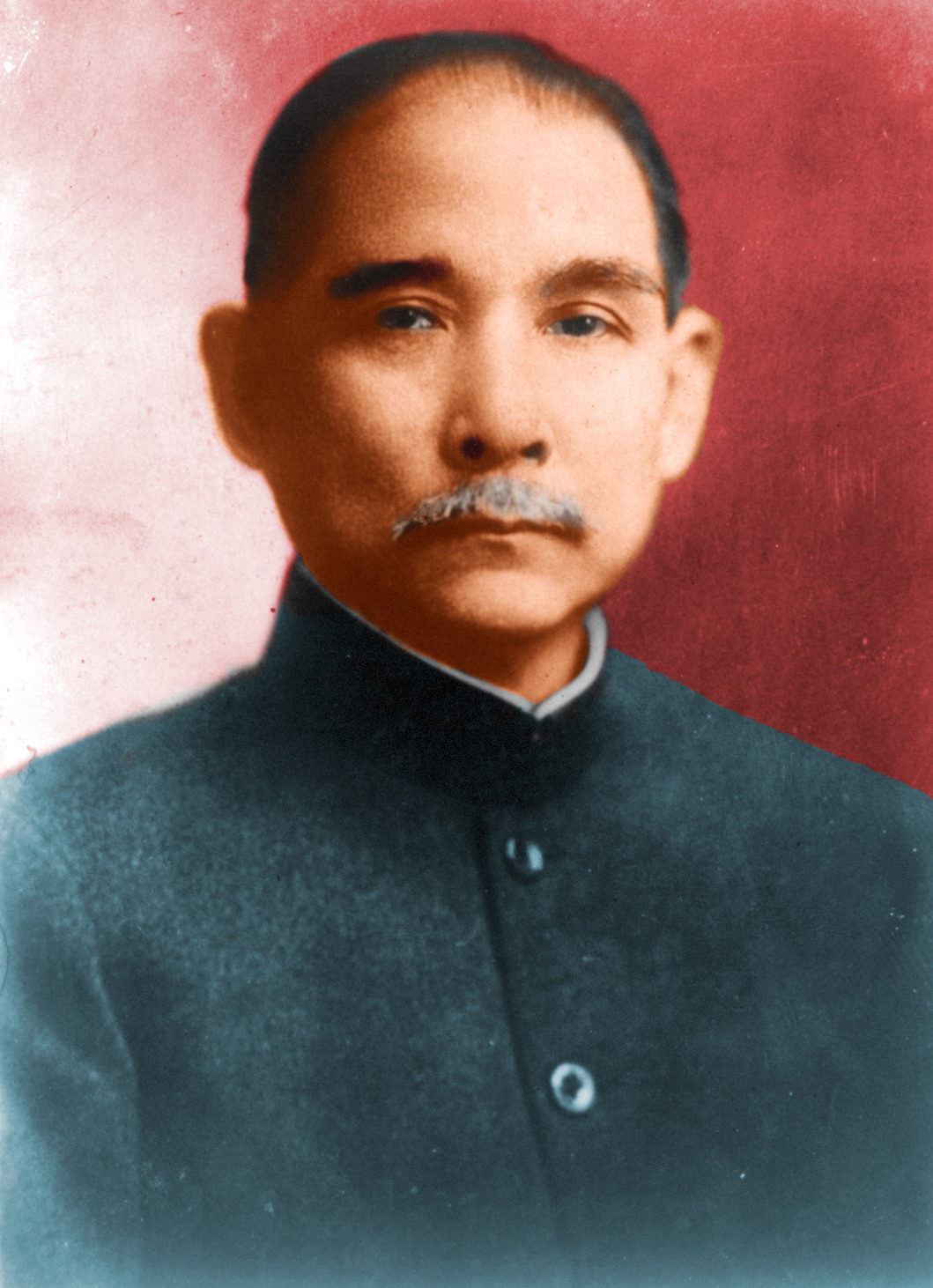
Republic of China President Sun Yat Sen

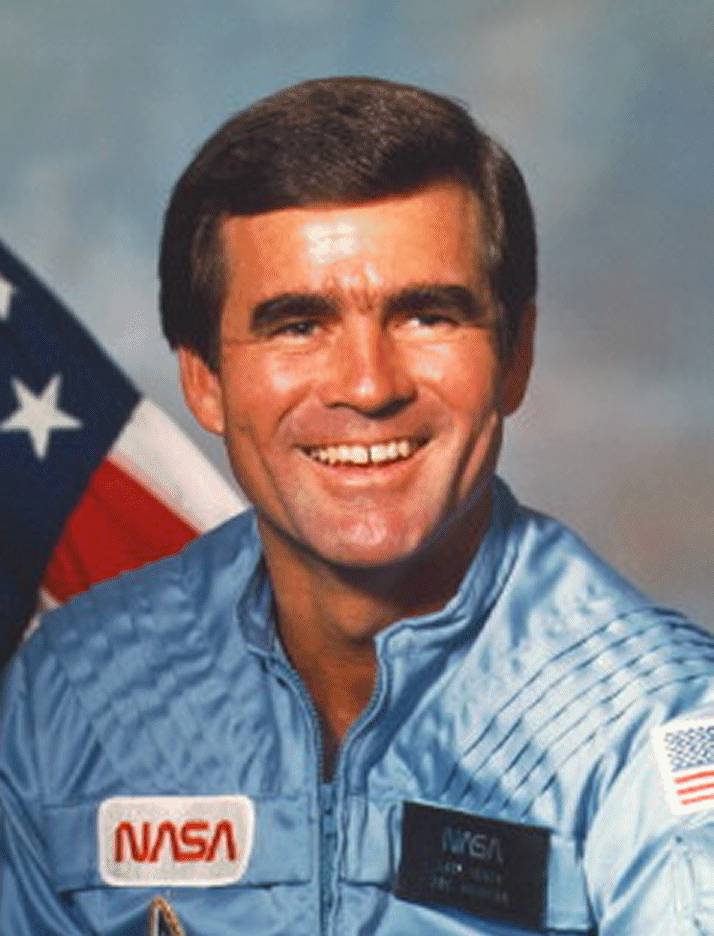
USAF Colonel Charles L. Veach, shuttle astronaut

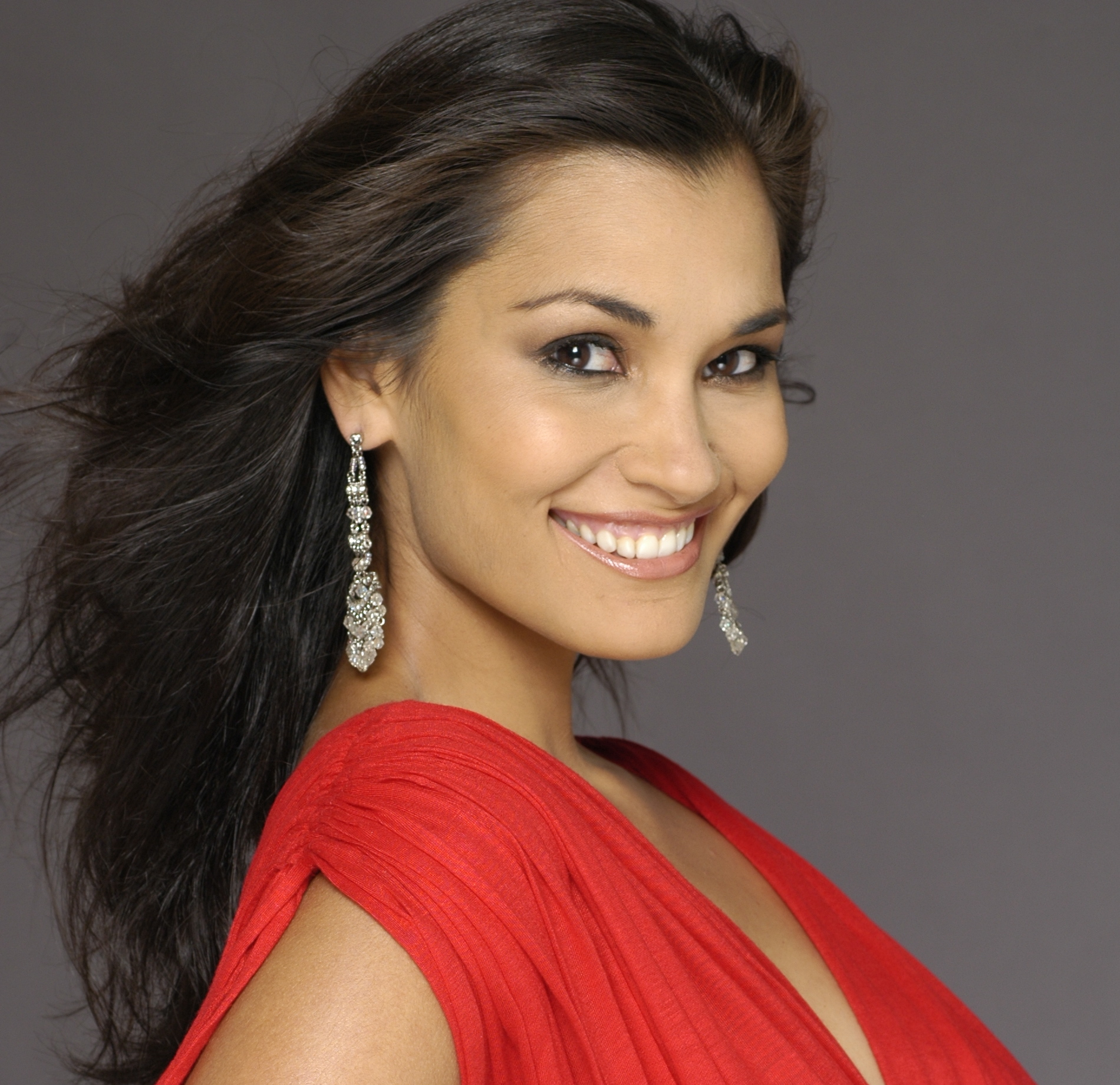
Miss Universe Brook Mahealani Lee

- 1861* Cornelia Hall Jones—co-founder of the Daughters of Hawaii
- 1863* Emma Smith Dillingham—co-founder of the Daughters of Hawaii and founder of the Oahu chapter of the YWCA
- 1875* Lorrin A. Thurston—leader of the overthrow of the Kingdom of Hawaii, owner of Honolulu Advertiser, early player of baseball with Cartwrights
- 1883* Sun Yat-Sen—founding president of the Republic of China, founder of the Kuomintang (attended 1882–83)
- '13 Clorinda Low Lucas (Smith, Columbia)—first Hawaiian woman to receive a professional training in social work, pioneer of Hawaiian social work
- '55* Ron Jacobs—co-creator of American Top 40
- '58 Jerry Berman (Berkeley)—chief legislative counsel of ACLU, director of Electronic Frontier Foundation and co-founder of Center for Democracy and Technology
- '62 Charles L. Veach (Air Force Academy)—astronaut, two shuttle missions; Distinguished Flying Cross, Purple Heart, Air Force Commendation Medal
- '65 Charlie Wedemeyer (Michigan State)—medical survivor celebrated in Emmy Award-winning film Quiet Victory
- '70 Arthur Johnsen—artist and painter of Hawaiiana, including The Goddess Pele
- '72 Nainoa Thompson (UH)—navigator of the Hōkūleʻa establishing Polynesian diaspora, chairman of board of trustees, Kamehameha Schools
- '75 Lindy Vivas (UCLA)—Fresno State women's volleyball coach, plaintiff awarded largest compensation for retaliation under Title IX discrimination statute
- '76 Judi Andersen—Miss Hawaii, Miss USA, and runner-up Miss Universe
- '79 Quentin Kawananakoa (USC)—a claimant to head of Hawaiian kingdom, Hawaii state representative, Republican minority leader
- '89* Brook Mahealani Lee—Miss Hawaii USA and Miss Universe 1997 (attended 1981–1987)
- '95 Kealoha (MIT)—performance poet (Hawaii's first poet laureate and National Poetry Slam Legend), storyteller, and Hawaii's SlamMaster
- '96* Ehren Watada (HPU)—Army lieutenant involved in Iraq War court-martial mistrial over command responsibility (attended 199?-93)
- '96* Lena Yada—professional wrestler and actress (attended 1992–1996)
- '02* Kiwi Camara (HPU)—youngest matriculate of Harvard Law School, catalyst for racial scandal (attended 1990-95?)

== Notable former faculty and staff ==
- Loye H. Miller, former biology instructor, paleontologist
- Susan Tolman Mills—former principal, founder of Mills College
- Lillian "Pokey" Watson (Richardson)—trustee, 1964 Olympic gold medalist (youngest female US gold in swimming), 1968 gold medalist
- Willard Warch—former schoolmaster, professor of music at Oberlin College, author of texts such as Music for Study and Beethoven's Use of Intermediate Keys, World War II Army Air Corps Band

== Additional references ==
The main reference for this page is the Punahou School Alumni Directory 1841-1991 Harris Publishing, New York, 1991.
