= Albert Cheng =

Albert Cheng may refer to:

- Albert Cheng (politician) (born 1946), Hong Kong Canadian radio host, businessman and politician
- Albert Cheng (executive) (born 1970), chief operating officer of Amazon Studios

== See also ==
- Albert Chang (born 1971), Canadian tennis player
- Albert M. Chang, condensed matter physicist
