= Miki McFadden =

American volleyball player (born 1948)

Personal information
- Full name: Barbara Briggs McFadden
- Born: January 24, 1948 (age 77); Honolulu, Territory of Hawaii, United States

Sport
- Sport: Volleyball

Miki McFadden (born January 24, 1948) is an American volleyball player. She competed in the women's tournament at the 1968 Summer Olympics.
