= Albert M. Chang =

- Scientific career
- Fields: Physics

Albert Mien-fu Chang (Chinese: 張綿福) is a condensed matter physicist.

Chang earned a bachelor of science degree in physics from the Massachusetts Institute of Technology in 1977. After completing doctoral study in the same subject at Princeton University in 1983, he successively worked for Bell Laboratories, AT&T Technologies, and Lucent from 1984 to 1997. Chang began his teaching career at Purdue University in 1997 and joined the Duke University faculty in 2003. In 2000, Chang was elected a fellow of the American Physical Society, "[f]or experimental studies of quantum Hall edge states and Luttinger liquids".
