= Keani Reiner =

Hawaiian surfer and sailor (1952–1994)

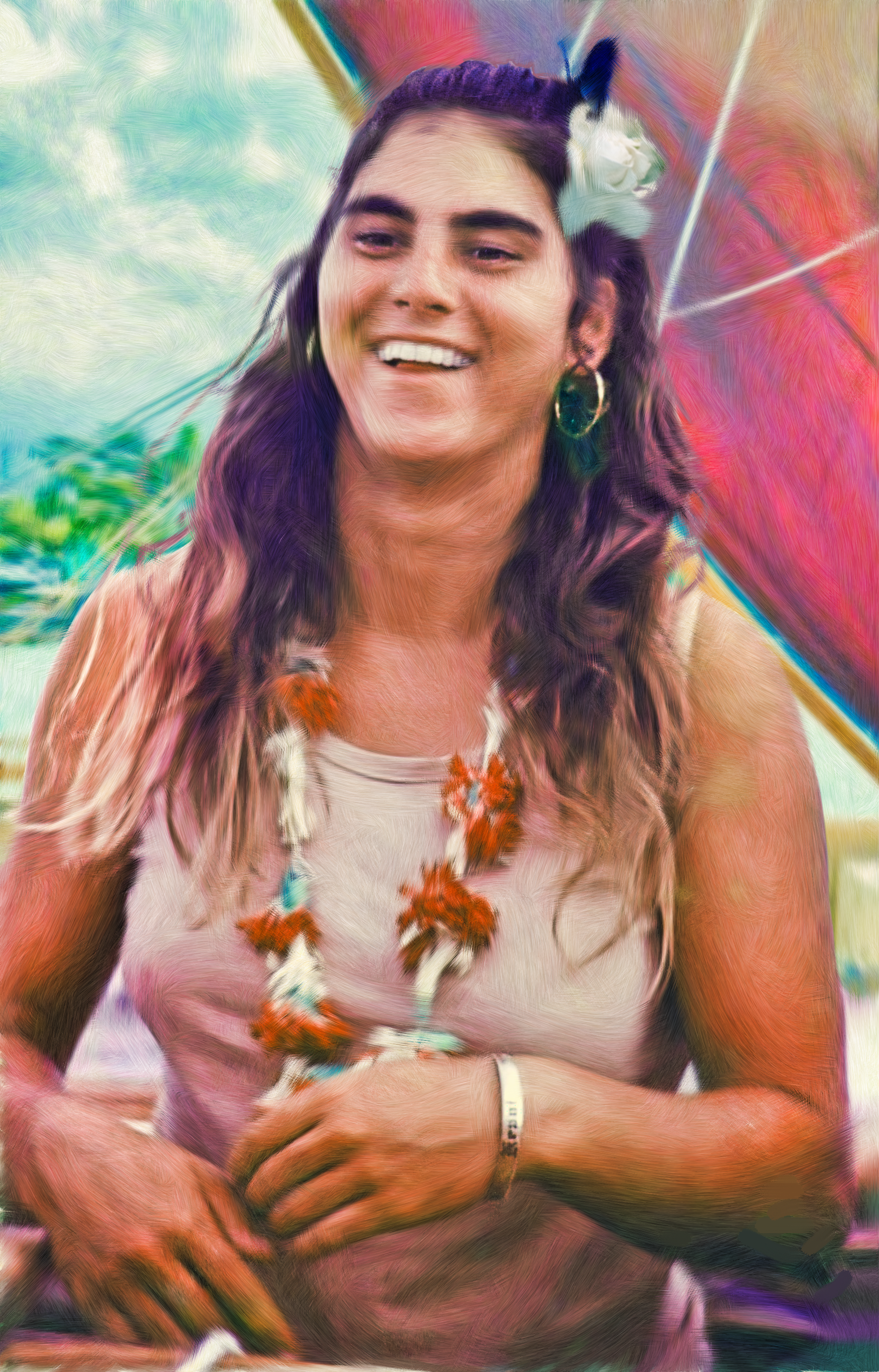

Personal information
- Born: Keani Reiner; March 20, 1952 Honolulu, Hawaii, United States
- Died: September 25, 1994 (aged 42) Hanalei, Hawaii

Surfing career
- Sport: Surfing
- Major achievements: 1990 Na Holokai Race; 1976 Hokulea Voyage

Keani Reiner (1952–1994) was a Hawaiian surfer and sailor. Keani Reiner and her crewmate Penny Rawlins were the first women to sail on a long-open ocean voyage aboard Hōkūleʻa on the return trip from Tahiti to Hawai'i in 1976. She was also a part of the first all-girl crew to complete the Na Holo Kai Sailing Canoe Race from Oahu to Kauai in 1990.

== Early life ==
She was born in Honolulu, Hawaii on March 20, 1952, of Blackfoot indian and German ancestry. Reiner completed her graduation from Punahou School. She was a member of the Outrigger Canoe Club. Keani sailed her own catamaran at the age of 7, which was built by her father.

== Career ==
In the 1970s she settled on the island of Kauai. In 1976, Keani Reiner and her crewmate Penny Rawlins were selected as the first two women to sail on Hokulea, a contemporary, traditionally designed, double hulled Polynesian sailing canoe, across the open ocean from Tahiti to Hawaii. She sailed along with other crew members including Snake Ah Hee, Andy Espirito, Kawika Kapahulehua, Mel Kinney, Kainoa Lee, Kimo Lyman, Gordon Piʻianaiʻa, Leonard Puputauiki, Penny Rawlins, Nainoa Thompson, Makaʻala Yates and Dr. Ben Young.

In a personal communication, her crewmate Penny Martin said,

When the selection committee met to decide on potential crewmembers for the final cut, there was only one woman that was named, Keani. The committee didn't want to take just one woman. Good for me. The guys remembered me from Moloka'i and said that there was another woman and she would go.

— Penny Martin, August, 2010

In 1990, Keani was a member of the first all-girl crew to complete the Na Holo Kai Sailing Canoe Race from Oahu to Kauai in 1990. She was also a certified captain. Keani Reiner is described as one of the pioneer women who showed the way and prepared the place for other women on board the traditional canoes of modern times.

== Personal life ==
Keani Reiner was married to John Kruse from 1980 until her divorce in 1988. She married Glenn Schot on June 2, 1990, in Hanalei, Kauai.

== Death ==
At the age of 42, she died of breast cancer on September 25, 1994. She was survived by her sister, Shea Reiner, husband Glenn Schot and her son Kepa Kruse.

== See also ==
- Hōkūleʻa
- List of surfers
