= Albert Cheng (executive) =

- Born: 1970 (age 55–56); Honolulu, Hawaii, U.S.
- Education: Massachusetts Institute of Technology (BS); Harvard University (MBA)
- Occupations: Executive Vice President and Chief Product Officer, Digital Media of Walt Disney Television

Albert Cheng (born 1970) is a Taiwanese-American businessman. He is the Chief Operating Officer of Amazon MGM Studios. He was the executive vice president and chief product officer of digital media for Walt Disney Television. Albert Cheng is an alumnus from Punahou School, in Honolulu, HI. Cheng graduated with a Bachelor of Science from MIT and a M.B.A from Harvard Business School. He serves on the Board of Directors of BMI.

== Early career ==
Cheng started his career as an engineer at Boeing after graduating from MIT. Following his stint at Boeing, Cheng obtained his MBA from Harvard Business School. During his time at graduate school, he interned at Disney and BMG. He spent four years as an associate and business strategy consultant for the Boston Consulting Group before he landed a job with Fox Cable Networks Group. He served at Fox as director of distribution strategy and later as director of business development at Fox/Liberty Networks before moving to Disney in 2000.

== Walt Disney Television ==
Cheng became intrigued by the potential of digital media and video over the Internet as he gained experience in distribution business strategies at Disney. He has served as the EVP and chief product officer of digital media since 2005. Cheng and his digital media team oversee the development and operations of digital media content platforms and interactive television technologies. In addition, Cheng is responsible for new business ventures in digital planning to improve the company's digital distribution strategy.

=== Work with the ABC Player app ===
In 2006, Cheng and his team made ABC the first network with its own online branded player to provide full ad-supported episodes online for free. Their work also led ABC to become the first network to stream full episodes on demand on a mobile platform with Sprint in 2007. In April 2010, Cheng's team made the ABC Player app the first iOS app to offer full episodes on the Apple iPad. In 2013, Cheng led his team to make the Watch ABC app the first broadcast network to offer live streaming of local TV stations.

=== Other works ===
Another contribution he and his team produced was the multiplatform application Oscar Digital Experience in February 2011, which used two dozen HD cameras to show live and behind-the-scenes Oscar footage.

In 2012, Cheng announced the launch of the WATCH Disney Channel, WATCH Disney XD and WATCH Disney Junior apps. These applications targeted toward younger audiences providing content through a live linear digital network and on demand episodes. He was elected to the Board of Directors of BMI in October 2013.

== Awards ==
Cheng received the 2006 Visionary Marketer Award at the Variety/iMedia Summit in April 2006. Cheng and his team's contributions have also won numerous awards and patents. In 2006, he and his team won the Outstanding Achievement in Advanced Interactive Television (New Delivery Platforms) at the 58th Annual Creative Arts Emmy Awards for their ABC.com Full Episode Player. In 2011, Cheng and his team received a Primetime Emmy for their ABC.com Oscar Digital Experience. In 2013, Cheng received a Digital Leadership Award from Broadcasting & Cable.

== Personal life ==
Cheng was born in Honolulu, HI. His parents are immigrants from Taiwan Cheng is married to Dori Chang.

== See also ==
- List of Punahou School alumni
