= Buck Henshaw =

American set decorator

- Born: George Herbert Henshaw; April 18, 1918
- Died: August 20, 2003 (aged 85); Honolulu, Hawaii, U.S.
- Occupation: Set decorator

George Herbert Henshaw (April 18, 1918 – August 20, 2003) was an American set decorator. He was known for his work on the television programs Hawaii Five-O, Tales of the Gold Monkey and Magnum, P.I..

Henshaw attended Punahou School, and graduated from Stanford University. before working as a newspaper columnist. He then attended Officer Candidate School and served in the armed forces during World War II, being taken prisoner by the Japanese forces and promoted to lieutenant commander upon his release. He then worked in Los Angeles, California at CBS Studios as an usher. He also wrote two songs.

Henshaw died on August 20, 2003 at the Queen's Medical Center in Honolulu, Hawaii, at the age of 85. He was buried at Oahu Cemetery.
