= List of Guggenheim Fellowships awarded in 1981 =

Two hundred and eighty-eight scholars, artists, and scientists received Guggenheim Fellowships in 1981. $5,099,000 was disbursed between the recipients, who were chosen from an applicant pool of 3,017. University of California, Berkeley had the most winners on their faculty (16), followed by Harvard University (14) and Yale University (9).

== 1981 U.S. and Canadian Fellows ==
| Category | Field of Study | Fellow | Institutional association | Research topic | Notes | Ref |
|---|---|---|---|---|---|---|
| Creative Arts | Choreography | Peter G. Anastos | | Travel to Leningrad to research for a book on Russian Imperial Ballet commissioned by Alfred A. Knopf | Also won in 1991 | |
| Creative Arts | Choreography | Laura Dean | Laura Dean Dancers and Musicians | New choreography and music composition | Also won in 1976 | |
| Creative Arts | Choreography | Andrew deGroat | | Choreography | | |
| Creative Arts | Choreography | David Gordon | Pick Up Performance Company | Choreography | | |
| Creative Arts | Choreography | Sara Rudner | Sara Rudner Performance Ensemble | Choreography | | |
| Creative Arts | Drama & Performance Art | Joanna Glass | | Play Memory (opened 1983) | | |
| Creative Arts | Drama & Performance Art | Lavonne Mueller | | Writing a play about Tolstoy | | |
| Creative Arts | Drama & Performance Art | James Schevill | Brown University | Playwriting | | |
| Creative Arts | Drama & Performance Art | Ntozake Shange | | Playwriting | | |
| Creative Arts | Drama & Performance Art | John Von Hartz | | Playwriting | | |
| Creative Arts | Drama & Performance Art | Gerald C. Weales | University of Hawaii (visiting) | Survey of American film comedy of the 1930s | | |
| Creative Arts | Drama & Performance Art | Samm-Art Williams | | Playwriting | | |
| Creative Arts | Fiction | Walter Abish | Columbia University | Writing sequel to How German Is It; also, purchasing a new typewriter | | |
| Creative Arts | Fiction | Margaret Atwood | | Writing | | |
| Creative Arts | Fiction | Gina Berriault | San Francisco State University | Writing | | |
| Creative Arts | Fiction | Frederick Busch | Colgate University | Writing | | |
| Creative Arts | Fiction | Stuart Dybek | Western Michigan University | Writing | | |
| Creative Arts | Fiction | William Gaddis | | Writing | | |
| Creative Arts | Fiction | Cecelia Holland | | Writing | | |
| Creative Arts | Fiction | Michael Mewshaw | University of Texas at Austin | Writing | | |
| Creative Arts | Fiction | Tim O'Brien | | Writing | | |
| Creative Arts | Film | Edward Bakst | | Experimentation with 2D computer animation | | |
| Creative Arts | Film | John Block | | Filmmaking | | |
| Creative Arts | Film | Julie Dash | | Research on Gullah culture of the Sea Islands | | |
| Creative Arts | Film | Josef K. Krames | Cleveland Clinic Educational Foundation | Filmmaking | | |
| Creative Arts | Film | William A. Lundberg | | Film installation pieces | | |
| Creative Arts | Film | Vladimir Rif | | Filmmaking | | |
| Creative Arts | Film | Ross Spears | | Filmmaking | | |
| Creative Arts | Film | Michael Weil | | Film: Pawns and Dreams | | |
| Creative Arts | Film, Video, & Radio Script Writing | Jon Swan | Columbia University | Research for his narrative poem Freydis Erik's-daughter & the Vinland Venture | | |
| Creative Arts | Fine Arts | Alice Adams | School of Visual Arts | Sculpture | | |
| Creative Arts | Fine Arts | Rudolf Baranik | Pratt Institute | Painting | | |
| Creative Arts | Fine Arts | Jake Berthot | Cooper Union | Painting | | |
| Creative Arts | Fine Arts | Paul Louis Brown | Brandeis University | Painting | | |
| Creative Arts | Fine Arts | Karen A. Carson | | Painting | | |
| Creative Arts | Fine Arts | Tom Clancy | Fordham College | Sculpture | | |
| Creative Arts | Fine Arts | Arthur Cohen | | Painting | | |
| Creative Arts | Fine Arts | Vera Klement | University of Chicago | Painting | | |
| Creative Arts | Fine Arts | Pedro Lujan | | Sculpture | | |
| Creative Arts | Fine Arts | Tom Marioni | Museum of Conceptual Art | Conceptual art | | |
| Creative Arts | Fine Arts | Laura Newman | | Painting | | |
| Creative Arts | Fine Arts | Raymond Parker | Hunter College, CUNY | Painting | Also won in 1967 | |
| Creative Arts | Fine Arts | Joanna Pousette-Dart | | Painting | | |
| Creative Arts | Fine Arts | Arden Scott | Parsons School of Design | Sculpture: built a seaworthy schooner | | |
| Creative Arts | Fine Arts | John G. Walker | | Painting | | |
| Creative Arts | Fine Arts | Isaac Witkin | Parsons School of Design | Sculpture | | |
| Creative Arts | Music Composition | Edward Barnes | First Act Theater | Composing | | |
| Creative Arts | Music Composition | Larry T. Bell | Boston Conservatory and Juilliard School | Composing | | |
| Creative Arts | Music Composition | Warren F. Benson | Eastman School of Music | Composing | | |
| Creative Arts | Music Composition | Anthony Braxton | | Composing | | |
| Creative Arts | Music Composition | Gerald Busby | | Composing | | |
| Creative Arts | Music Composition | Stuart R. Dempster | University of Washington | Composing | | |
| Creative Arts | Music Composition | John Anthony Lennon | University of Tennessee | Composing commissioned works for chamber groups and orchestras | | |
| Creative Arts | Music Composition | Tobias Picker | | Composing | | |
| Creative Arts | Music Composition | Tison C. Street | Harvard University | Composing | | |
| Creative Arts | Music Composition | Ramon Zupko | Western Michigan University | Composing | | |
| Creative Arts | Music Composition | Menachem Zur | Rubin Academy of Music in Jerusalem | Composing | | |
| Creative Arts | Photography | Jerry Dantzic | Long Island University | | Also won in 1977 | |
| Creative Arts | Photography | Jay Dusard | | The North American Cowboy series | | |
| Creative Arts | Photography | Paul Kwilecki | | | | |
| Creative Arts | Photography | Helen Levitt | | | Also won in 1959 and 1960 | |
| Creative Arts | Photography | Jerome Liebling | Hampshire College | | Also won in 1976 | |
| Creative Arts | Photography | William Maguire | Florida International University | Night photography in small towns in the southeastern US | | |
| Creative Arts | Photography | Paul A. McDonough | Pratt Institute | | | |
| Creative Arts | Photography | Meridel Rubenstein | University of Colorado Boulder (visiting) | | | |
| Creative Arts | Photography | David Weaver Wing | Grossmont College | | | |
| Creative Arts | Poetry | Madeline DeFrees | University of Massachusetts Amherst | Writing | | |
| Creative Arts | Poetry | Carol Muske | University of Virginia (visiting) | Writing | | |
| Creative Arts | Poetry | Sharon Olds | | Writing | | |
| Creative Arts | Poetry | John Peck | Mount Holyoke College | Writing | | |
| Creative Arts | Poetry | Michael Ryan | Princeton University | Writing | | |
| Creative Arts | Poetry | Wendy Salinger | South Carolina Arts Commission (visiting) | Writing | | |
| Creative Arts | Poetry | James Schuyler | | Writing | | |
| Creative Arts | Poetry | Dave Smith | | Critical essays on James Wright | | |
| Creative Arts | Poetry | David Anthony Wevill | University of Texas at Austin | Writing | | |
| Creative Arts | Video & Audio | Skip Blumberg | | | | |
| Creative Arts | Video & Audio | John Floyd Sturgeon | | Uses of computers on camera-generated video images | | |
| Humanities | American Literature | Allen Guttmann | Amherst College | Avery Brundage and the Olympic Movement | | |
| Humanities | American Literature | Mason Lowance Jr. | University of Massachusetts Amherst | | | |
| Humanities | American Literature | Joel Myerson | University of South Carolina | Compilation of a descriptive bibliography which will include full publication information on the works of Emily Dickinson | | |
| Humanities | American Literature | Joel Porte | Harvard University | | | |
| Humanities | American Literature | Richard Ruland | College of William and Mary (visiting) | British backgrounds of American literature | | |
| Humanities | American Literature | Frederick Turner | University of New Mexico (visiting) | | | |
| Humanities | Architecture, Planning, & Design | Jean Bony | UC Berkeley | Architectural consequences of the Norman conquest of England | | |
| Humanities | Architecture, Planning, & Design | Dolores Hayden | UCLA | American spatial design and political influence from colonial times to the present | | |
| Humanities | Architecture, Planning, & Design | Allan B. Jacobs | UC Berkeley | Field observation in the planning and design of cities | | |
| Humanities | Biography | Robert Fizdale | | | | |
| Humanities | Biography | Arthur Gold | | | | |
| Humanities | Biography | Meryle Secrest | | | | |
| Humanities | British History | George Ramsay Cook | York University | | | |
| Humanities | British History | Derek Hirst | Washington University in St. Louis | Role of the military under Oliver Cromwell | | |
| Humanities | British History | Leonard M. Thompson | Yale University | | | |
| Humanities | Classics | Anne Pippin Burnett | University of Chicago | | | |
| Humanities | Classics | Charles P. Segal | Harvard University | | | |
| Humanities | Classics | Leslie L. Threatte, Jr. | UC Berkeley | Attic inscriptions | | |
| Humanities | East Asian Studies | Tetsuo Najita | University of Chicago | | | |
| Humanities | East Asian Studies | Denis Sinor | Indiana University | History of Inner Asia | Also won in 1968 | |
| Humanities | East Asian Studies | William Theodore de Bary | Columbia University | Individualism in Neo-Confucian thought | | |
| Humanities | Economic History | Mira Wilkins | Florida International University | Scholarly history of foreign investment in the States | | |
| Humanities | English Literature | David M. Bevington | University of Chicago | | Also won in 1964 | |
| Humanities | English Literature | Jay Franklin Fellows | | | | |
| Humanities | English Literature | Samuel Hynes | Princeton University | English literature and society, 1914-1926 | Also won in 1959 | |
| Humanities | English Literature | Peter J. Manning | University of Southern California | | | |
| Humanities | English Literature | Louis L. Martz | Yale University | | Also won in 1948 | |
| Humanities | English Literature | James C. Nohrnberg | University of Virginia | Epic work of John Milton | | |
| Humanities | English Literature | William S. Peterson | University of Maryland | | | |
| Humanities | English Literature | Maureen Quilligan | Yale University | Renaissance politics, courtship, and literary culture | | |
| Humanities | English Literature | Peter L. Shillingsburg | Mississippi State University | William Makepeace Thackeray and his publishers | | |
| Humanities | English Literature | Meredith Anne Skura | Rice University | Patterns in Shakespeare's use of sources | | |
| Humanities | English Literature | Thomas O. Sloane | UC Berkeley | Donne, John Milton, and the disintegration of humanist rhetoric | | |
| Humanities | English Literature | Marianna Torgovnick | Williams College | Modern art and the modern novel | | |
| Humanities | English Literature | George T. Wright | University of Minnesota | | | |
| Humanities | Fine Arts Research | Walter Cahn | Yale University | Illustrations of the Grandes Chroniques de France | | |
| Humanities | Fine Arts Research | Marianne W. Martin | Boston College | Relationship between art and dance during the past hundred years | | |
| Humanities | Fine Arts Research | Otto Karl Werckmeister | UCLA | Historical conditions of Paul Klee's career | | |
| Humanities | French History | Elizabeth L. Eisenstein | University of Michigan | French publicists in politics, 1750-1850 | | |
| Humanities | French History | Christopher H. Johnson | Wayne State University | Industrialization and deindustrialization in Languedoc, 1700-1914 | | |
| Humanities | French History | Donald R. Kelley | University of Rochester | Tradition of law and science of humanity | Also won in 1974 | |
| Humanities | French Literature | Claude Abraham | | | | |
| Humanities | French Literature | Gérard Defaux | Johns Hopkins University | Rabelais' Pantagruel and Christian skepticism in the early 16th century | | |
| Humanities | French Literature | Denis Hollier | UC Berkeley | Social disorder in the novel | | |
| Humanities | French Literature | Jeffrey S. Mehlman | Johns Hopkins University | Maurice Blanchot's writings of the 1930s | | |
| Humanities | General Nonfiction | Robert Garis | Wellesley College | | | |
| Humanities | German & East European History | Peter J. Loewenberg | UCLA | Austrian Marxists, 1889-1938 | | |
| Humanities | German & Scandinavian Literature | Peter M. Daly | McGill University | | | |
| Humanities | German & Scandinavian Literature | Paul Michael Lützeler | Washington University in St. Louis | Definitive biography of Hermann Broch | | |
| Humanities | History of Science | Daniel J. Kevles | California Institute of Technology | History of eugenics and human genetics in the US and Britain, 1890s-present | | |
| Humanities | History of Science | Margaret W. Rossiter | UC Berkeley | History of women scientists in the United States | | |
| Humanities | Iberian & Latin American History | Nicolás Sánchez-Albornoz | New York University | | | |
| Humanities | Iberian & Latin American History | John Womack | Harvard University | | | |
| Humanities | Intellectual & Cultural History | Robert Wohl | UCLA | Cultural history of the First World War | | |
| Humanities | Latin American Literature | Thomas Colchie | | Translation of The Devil to Pay in the Backlands | | |
| Humanities | Linguistics | Suzanne Fleischman | UC Berkeley | Tense, aspect, and modality in Romance languages | | |
| Humanities | Literary Criticism | T. Walter Herbert Jr. | Southwestern University | | | |
| Humanities | Literary Criticism | W. J. T. Mitchell | University of Chicago | Image in literature and the visual arts | | |
| Humanities | Literary Criticism | Marjorie Gabrielle Perloff | University of Southern California | Futurist poetics | | |
| Humanities | Literary Criticism | Janet Todd | Douglass College | The servant in English literature | | |
| Humanities | Literary Criticism | Paul de Man | Yale University | Research at Northwestern University | Also won in 1970 | |
| Humanities | Medieval History | Michael R. McVaugh | University of North Carolina at Chapel Hill | Medical society and practice in Aragon, Spain, 1290-1330 | | |
| Humanities | Medieval Literature | Frederick L. Cheyette | Amherst College | History of Southern France before the Albigensian Crusade | | |
| Humanities | Medieval Literature | H. Marshall Leicester Jr. | UC Santa Cruz | Impersonated artistry and the art of compromise in the Canterbury Tales | | |
| Humanities | Medieval Literature | James Irving Wimsatt | University of Texas at Austin | Chaucer and his French contemporaries | | |
| Humanities | Music Research | Claude Victor Palisca | Yale University | | Also won in 1959 | |
| Humanities | Music Research | Loren Partridge | UC Berkeley | Image of war and peace in Italian Renaissance art and culture | | |
| Humanities | Music Research | Curtis Alexander Price | Washington University in St. Louis | Theatre music of Henry Purcell | | |
| Humanities | Music Research | Harvey Sachs | | Musical life in Mussolini's Italy | | |
| Humanities | Near Eastern Studies | William G. Dever | University of Arizona | Excavation of Bronze Age settlements in the central highlands of the Negev Desert in the Sinai | | |
| Humanities | Near Eastern Studies | Roy P. Mottahedeh | Princeton University | Bureaucracy in medieval Iran and Iraq | | |
| Humanities | Near Eastern Studies | Eugene Ulrich | University of Notre Dame | Editio princeps of the approximately 50 Dead Sea Scrolls allotted to Patrick W. Skehan | | |
| Humanities | Philosophy | R. E. Allen | Northwestern University | Philosophical commentary on Plato's Republic | | |
| Humanities | Philosophy | Michael Frede | Princeton University | Epistemology of Hellenistic medicine | | |
| Humanities | Philosophy | Bernd Magnus | UC Riverside | Nietzsche's deconstruction of philosophy | | |
| Humanities | Philosophy | Alexander Rosenberg | Syracuse University | | | |
| Humanities | Philosophy | Barry Stroud | UC Berkeley | Philosophical skepticism | | |
| Humanities | Photography Studies | Henry G. Wilhelm | | Stability and preservation of color photographs | | |
| Humanities | Religion | William A. Graham Jr. | Harvard University | Function and concept of "Scripture" in the history of religion | | |
| Humanities | Religion | John Meyendorff | St. Vladimir's Orthodox Theological Seminary | | | |
| Humanities | Russian History | Alexander Rabinowitch | Indiana University | Petrograd politics and society during the first six month of Soviet rule | | |
| Humanities | Russian History | Richard S. Wortman | Princeton University | Culture and mentality of Russian autocracy, 1825-1917 | | |
| Humanities | Slavic Literature | Maurice Friedberg | University of Illinois Urbana-Champaign | Literary translation in Russia | Also won in 1970 | |
| Humanities | Slavic Literature | John Glad | University of Maryland | | | |
| Humanities | Slavic Literature | Robert Tracy | UC Berkeley | Translation of Osip Mandelstam's Tristia | | |
| Humanities | South Asian Studies | Alfred Hiltebeitel | George Washington University | | | |
| Humanities | South Asian Studies | Thomas R. Metcalf | UC Berkeley | British colonial architecture in India and Africa, 1880-1930 | | |
| Humanities | Spanish & Portuguese Literature | Francisco Márquez Villanueva | Harvard University | | | |
| Humanities | Spanish & Portuguese Literature | Colbert I. Nepaulsingh | SUNY Albany | | | |
| Humanities | Theatre Arts | Brooks McNamara | New York University | The Shuberts and the American theatre | | |
| Humanities | United States History | James L. Axtell | College of William and Mary | The Invasion Within: The contest of cultures in colonial North America (published 1986) | | |
| Humanities | United States History | David D. Hall | Boston University | | | |
| Humanities | United States History | Charles E. Neu | Brown University | | | |
| Humanities | United States History | Nell Irvin Painter | University of North Carolina at Chapel Hill | American views of the South from the emancipation period following the Civil War to the first half of the 20th century, when W. J. Cash and Richard Wright wrote their major works about the South | | |
| Humanities | United States History | Lewis Curtis Perry | Indiana University | Emotions in American thought and culture | | |
| Humanities | United States History | Michael Schaller | University of Arizona | Reviewing the occupation of Japan and containment in Southeast Asia, 1945-1953 | | |
| Humanities | United States History | Robert Huddleston Wiebe | Northwestern University | | | |
| Humanities | United States History | Joan Hoff Wilson | University of Virginia (visiting) | Legal legacy of Mary Ritter Beard | | |
| Humanities | United States History | Donald E. Worster | University of Hawaii | Irrigation in the west and its political and economic impact on society | | |
| Natural Sciences | Applied Mathematics | Joel E. Cohen | Rockefeller University | Mathematical population theory | | |
| Natural Sciences | Applied Mathematics | Bengt Fornberg | University of Colorado at Boulder | Computational methods in fluid mechanics | | |
| Natural Sciences | Applied Mathematics | David Gale | UC Berkeley | Economic applications of optimization theory | Also won in 1962 | |
| Natural Sciences | Applied Mathematics | Harold Grad | New York University | Mathematical and physical properties of queer differential equations | | |
| Natural Sciences | Applied Mathematics | Benjamin Lax | Massachusetts Institute of Technology | Nonlinear maneto-optics | | |
| Natural Sciences | Applied Mathematics | Burton H. Singer | Columbia University and Rockefeller University | Longitudinal studies in medicine and sociology | | |
| Natural Sciences | Applied Mathematics | Roger J. B. Wets | University of Kentucky | Decision making that involves mathematical modeling | | |
| Natural Sciences | Astronomy & Astrophysics | Nicholas Z. Scoville | University of Massachusetts Amherst | Observational and theoretical studies of star formation | | |
| Natural Sciences | Astronomy & Astrophysics | Saul Teukolsky | Cornell University | Relativistic astrophysics | | |
| Natural Sciences | Chemistry | Michael J. Berry | Rice University | Molecular dynamics | | |
| Natural Sciences | Chemistry | Weston T. Borden | University of Washington | Research at Institute for Molecular Science and Princeton University | | |
| Natural Sciences | Chemistry | Daryle H. Busch | Ohio State University | Oxidation mechanisms | | |
| Natural Sciences | Chemistry | David Chandler | University of Illinois Urbana-Champaign | Quantum processes in condensed phases | | |
| Natural Sciences | Chemistry | Bruce Ganem | Cornell University | Organic synthesis | | |
| Natural Sciences | Chemistry | James Edwin Guillet | University of Toronto | | | |
| Natural Sciences | Chemistry | C. David Gutsche | Washington University in St. Louis | Enzyme models | | |
| Natural Sciences | Chemistry | Kenneth D. Jordan | University of Pittsburgh | Electron transmission spectroscopy | | |
| Natural Sciences | Chemistry | W. Carl Lineberger | University of Colorado Boulder | | | |
| Natural Sciences | Chemistry | William Martin McClain | Wayne State University | | | |
| Natural Sciences | Chemistry | Devon W. Meek | Ohio State University | Synthesis of small metal clusters | | |
| Natural Sciences | Chemistry | Albert Padwa | Emory University | | | |
| Natural Sciences | Chemistry | W. Clark Still Jr. | Columbia University | Stereochemical control | | |
| Natural Sciences | Chemistry | Robert W. Woody | Colorado State University | | | |
| Natural Sciences | Computer Science | Robert M. Gray | Stanford University | Research at University of Paris XI | | |
| Natural Sciences | Computer Science | Richard J. Lipton | Princeton University | Theory of very-large-scale integration | | |
| Natural Sciences | Computer Science | Zohar Manna | Stanford University | Verification and synthesis of concurrent programs | | |
| Natural Sciences | Earth Science | Peter M. Bell | Carnegie Institution of Washington | Composition and properties of the earth's mantle | | |
| Natural Sciences | Earth Science | Christopher J. Garrett | Dalhousie University | | | |
| Natural Sciences | Earth Science | Raymond Siever | Harvard University | Research at the University of Tokyo | | |
| Natural Sciences | Earth Science | Carl Wunsch | Massachusetts Institute of Technology | | | |
| Natural Sciences | Engineering | Larry M. Sweet | Princeton University | Transfer of advanced transportation technology from Japan to the US | | |
| Natural Sciences | Mathematics | Harold M. Edwards | New York University | History of algebraic number theory | | |
| Natural Sciences | Mathematics | Paul R. Garabedian | New York University | Magnetohydrodynamic equilibrium | Also won in 1966 | |
| Natural Sciences | Mathematics | Robert L. Griess | University of Michigan | Sporadic simple groups | | |
| Natural Sciences | Mathematics | Branko Grünbaum | University of Washington | Geometry of patterns | | |
| Natural Sciences | Mathematics | Melvin Hochster | University of Michigan | Commutative algebra and algebraic geometry | | |
| Natural Sciences | Mathematics | Tsit-Yuen Lam | UC Berkeley | Algebraic theory of quadratic forms and ordered fields | | |
| Natural Sciences | Mathematics | Julius L. Shaneson | Rutgers University | Geometric topology | | |
| Natural Sciences | Medicine & Health | David H. Alpers | Washington University School of Medicine | Intestinal protein metabolism and function | | |
| Natural Sciences | Medicine & Health | Alvin E. Davis III | Harvard University | | | |
| Natural Sciences | Medicine & Health | Bruce A. D. Stocker | Stanford University | | Also won in 1971 | |
| Natural Sciences | Medicine & Health | Saul Winegrad | University of Pennsylvania | | | |
| Natural Sciences | Medicine & Health | Lee Alan Witters | Harvard University | | | |
| Natural Sciences | Molecular & Cellular Biology | Harrison Echols | UC Berkeley | Control of fidelity in DNA replication | | |
| Natural Sciences | Molecular & Cellular Biology | Murray J. Fraser | McGill University | | | |
| Natural Sciences | Molecular & Cellular Biology | William A. Gibbons | University of Wisconsin–Madison | Enzyme mechanisms, metabolic pathways, and their control on whole cells | | |
| Natural Sciences | Molecular & Cellular Biology | Donald R. Helinski | UC San Diego | Circular DNA elements in animal cells | | |
| Natural Sciences | Molecular & Cellular Biology | Elizabeth W. Jones | Carnegie-Mellon University | Genetic analysis of enzyme processing and localization in yeast | | |
| Natural Sciences | Molecular & Cellular Biology | Arthur Louis Koch | Indiana University | Role of surface stress in the morphology of microbes | | |
| Natural Sciences | Molecular & Cellular Biology | Mauricio Montal | UC San Diego | Molecular neurobiology and psychopharmacology | | |
| Natural Sciences | Neuroscience | Darwin K. Berg | UC San Diego | Factors in the survival of neurons | | |
| Natural Sciences | Neuroscience | Albert J. Berger | University of Washington | | | |
| Natural Sciences | Neuroscience | William B. Kristan Jr. | UC San Diego | Regeneration in annelid nervous systems | | |
| Natural Sciences | Organismic Biology & Ecology | Max K. Hecht | Queens College | | | |
| Natural Sciences | Organismic Biology & Ecology | Kenneth Henry Nealson | UC San Diego | Precipitation of metals by marine bacteria | | |
| Natural Sciences | Organismic Biology & Ecology | Robert T. Paine | University of Washington | | | |
| Natural Sciences | Organismic Biology & Ecology | Thomas J. M. Schopf | University of Chicago | | | |
| Natural Sciences | Organismic Biology & Ecology | David B. Wake | UC Berkeley | Evolution of European and American salamanders | | |
| Natural Sciences | Organismic Biology & Ecology | Ernest Edward Williams | Harvard University | | Also won in 1952 | |
| Natural Sciences | Plant Sciences | Michael T. Clegg | University of Georgia | | | |
| Natural Sciences | Plant Sciences | Roger M. Spanswick | Cornell University | Membrane transport in plants | | |
| Natural Sciences | Physics | Eric G. Adelberger | University of Washington | | | |
| Natural Sciences | Physics | Donald F. DuBois | Los Alamos Scientific Laboratory | | | |
| Natural Sciences | Physics | John D. Joannopoulos | Massachusetts Institute of Technology | | | |
| Natural Sciences | Physics | Tom Lubensky | University of Pennsylvania | | | |
| Natural Sciences | Physics | Alfred K. Mann | University of Pennsylvania | | | |
| Natural Sciences | Physics | Luke W. Mo | Virginia Polytechnic Institute and State University | | | |
| Natural Sciences | Physics | Donald Robert Uhlmann | Massachusetts Institute of Technology | Research at École Polytechnique Fédérale de Lausanne | | |
| Social Sciences | Anthropology & Cultural Studies | Eric Delson | American Museum of Natural History | | | |
| Social Sciences | Anthropology & Cultural Studies | Kent V. Flannery | University of Michigan | Origins of agriculture in the prehistoric valley of Oaxaca | | |
| Social Sciences | Anthropology & Cultural Studies | Melvin Konner | Harvard University | | | |
| Social Sciences | Anthropology & Cultural Studies | Lawrence Rosen | Princeton University | Theory and practice of justice in modern Islamic law court | | |
| Social Sciences | Anthropology & Cultural Studies | Stanley J. Tambiah | Harvard University | | | |
| Social Sciences | Economics | Pranab K. Bardhan | UC Berkeley | Land, labor, and rural poverty | | |
| Social Sciences | Economics | Franklin M. Fisher | Massachusetts Institute of Technology | | | |
| Social Sciences | Economics | Sanford J. Grossman | University of Pennsylvania | | | |
| Social Sciences | Economics | Robert E. Lucas Jr. | University of Chicago | | | |
| Social Sciences | Economics | Charles R. Plott | California Institute of Technology | Developing experimental methods in political economy research | | |
| Social Sciences | Education | Robert Francis Engs | University of Pennsylvania | | | |
| Social Sciences | Environmental Studies & Geography | Martyn Carden Kellman | York University | | | |
| Social Sciences | Environmental Studies & Geography | Billie Lee Turner II | Clark University | | | |
| Social Sciences | Law | Calum Carmichael | Cornell University | Law and narrative in the Bible | | |
| Social Sciences | Law | Robert M. Cover | Yale Law School | Supreme Court and American ideology | | |
| Social Sciences | Law | Charles Donahue Jr. | Harvard Law School | Marriage in law and family in the Middle Ages | | |
| Social Sciences | Law | Ernest Gellhorn | University of Virginia | Foundations of the unfairness doctrine and its evolution through the 1972 FTC v. Sperry & Hutchinson Trading Stamp Co. Supreme Court case | | |
| Social Sciences | Law | Joseph Goldstein | Yale Law School | | | |
| Social Sciences | Political Science | Marshall Berman | City College of New York | | | |
| Social Sciences | Political Science | Thomas P. Bernstein | Columbia University | Soviet and Chinese peasants under state socialism | | |
| Social Sciences | Political Science | Bernard C. Cohen | University of Wisconsin–Madison | Public participation in foreign policy-making | | |
| Social Sciences | Political Science | Martha Ann Derthick | Brookings Institution | | | |
| Social Sciences | Political Science | John A. Ferejohn | California Institute of Technology | Legislators and their constituencies | | |
| Social Sciences | Political Science | Ole R. Holsti | Duke University | Research on the impact of the Vietnam War on the beliefs of American leaders | | |
| Social Sciences | Political Science | Thomas L Pangle | University of Toronto | | | |
| Social Sciences | Psychology | Elliot Aronson | UC Santa Cruz | Peer teaching to reduce unintended teenage pregnancy | | |
| Social Sciences | Psychology | Elizabeth Bates | University of Colorado Boulder | | | |
| Social Sciences | Psychology | Ann Lesley Brown | University of Illinois | | | |
| Social Sciences | Psychology | Lawrence Hubert | UC Santa Barbara | | | |
| Social Sciences | Psychology | Harold H. Kelley | UCLA | Patterns of social interaction | | |
| Social Sciences | Psychology | Hope Jensen Leichter | Columbia University | Role of memory within the family | | |
| Social Sciences | Psychology | John E. R. Staddon | Duke University | Dynamics of learning | | |
| Social Sciences | Sociology | Eliot L. Freidson | New York University | Power of the professions | | |
| Social Sciences | Sociology | Mark Granovetter | SUNY at Stony Brook | Sociology of income differences | | |
| Social Sciences | Sociology | Andrew Scull | UC San Diego | Concepts of insanity in England, 1750-1890 | | |
| Social Sciences | Sociology | Paul Starr | Harvard University | Politics and social theory | | |
| Social Sciences | Sociology | Maurice Zeitlin | UCLA | Socialists and organized labor in America since the 1930s | | |

== 1981 Latin American and Caribbean Fellows ==
| Category | Field of Study | Fellow | Institutional association | Research topic | Notes | Ref |
|---|---|---|---|---|---|---|
| Creative Arts | Fiction | Reinaldo Arenas | | Writing | | |
| Creative Arts | Fiction | Griselda Gambaro | | Writing | | |
| Creative Arts | Fine Art | Paulo Roberto Barbosa Bruscky | | Visual art | | |
| Creative Arts | Fine Art | Miguel Cervantes | | Painting | | |
| Creative Arts | Fine Art | Luis Frangella | | Visual art | | |
| Creative Arts | Music Composition | Germán Cáceres | | Composing | | |
| Creative Arts | Poetry | Daniel Leva | Sociedad General de Escritores de México | Writing | | |
| Humanities | Architecture, Planning, & Design | Lygia Pape | Universidade Santa Úrsula | Popular architecture in Brazil | | |
| Humanities | Fine Arts Research | Teresa del Conde | National Autonomous University of Mexico | Freud's aesthetic ideas | | |
| Humanities | Iberian & Latin American History | M. Blanca París Oddone | National Autonomous University of Mexico | Social history of education in Uruguay | | |
| Humanities | Linguistics | Rodolfo Cerrón-Palomino | National University of San Marcos | | | |
| Humanities | Spanish & Portuguese Literature | Affonso Romano de Sant'Anna | University of Provence | Carnival and "carnivalization" in Brazilian literature | | |
| Natural Sciences | Chemistry | Arnoldo Felisberto Imbiriba da Rocha | Federal University of Amazonas | Alkaloids of Amazonian plants | | |
| Natural Sciences | Mathematics | Paul A. Schweitzer | Pontifical Catholic University of Rio de Janeiro | | | |
| Natural Sciences | Molecular & Cellular Biology | Giuseppe Cilento | University of São Paulo | | Also won in 1977 | |
| Natural Sciences | Molecular & Cellular Biology | José Luis Saborío | National Polytechnic Institute | Protein modification in protein function | | |
| Natural Sciences | Neuroscience | Hugo Aréchiga | National Autonomous University of Mexico | Neuroendocrine aspects of biological rhythms | | |
| Natural Sciences | Physics | Carlos Federico Bunge | National Autonomous University of Mexico | Atomic properties | | |
| Natural Sciences | Physics | Belita Koiller | Pontificia Universidade Católica do Rio de Janeiro | Research at UC Berkeley | | |
| Natural Sciences | Plant Sciences | William Antônio Rodrigues | National Institute of Amazonian Research | Taxonomic studies of Myristicaceae | Also won in 1970 | |
| Natural Sciences | Plant Sciences | Patricio von Hildebrand | | Dynamics of regeneration in tropical rainforests | | |
| Social Sciences | Anthropology | Lourdes Arizpe | Colegio de México | Culture in developing countries | | |
| Social Sciences | Economics | Adolfo Martin Canitrot | Center for Studies of the State and Society | Industrialization policy and economic behavior in Argentina, 1930-1976 | | |
| Social Sciences | Political Science | Juan Pablo Terra Gallinal | Political process | | | |
| Social Sciences | Sociology | Néstor García Canclini | National School of Anthropology and History and National Autonomous University of Mexico | Sociology of art and culture | | |
| Social Sciences | Sociology | Sergio Miceli Pessôa de Barros | Fundação Getulio Vargas | Sociology of the Brazilian Catholic Church, 1890-1980 | | |

== See also ==
- Guggenheim Fellowship
- List of Guggenheim Fellowships awarded in 1980
- List of Guggenheim Fellowships awarded in 1982
