= Pritikin =

Pritikin may refer to:

- Bob Pritikin (1929–2022), author and advertising executive
- Greg Pritikin, filmmaker
- Jerry Pritikin, baseball fan
- Jon Pritikin (born 1973), motivational speaker
- Nathan Pritikin (1915–1985), nutritionist
- Renny Pritikin, director of the Nelson Gallery

== See also ==
- Pritikin Diet
