= William Maguire =

William Maguire may refer to:

- William A. Maguire (born 1959), Irish historian
- William J. Maguire (1916–1997), American politician from New Jersey
- William Maguire (photographer), recipient of 1981 Guggenheim Fellowship
