= Marcie Dodd =

American stage actress (born 1978)

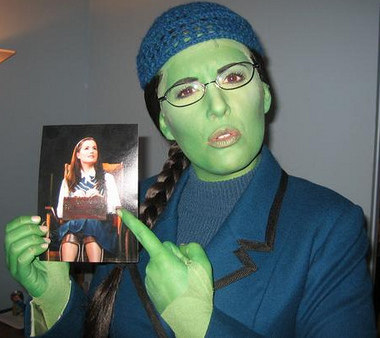
- Dodd in 2010 in character as Elphaba
- Born: March 10, 1978 (age 48); Yuba City, California, United States
- Education: Bethany College; Azusa Pacific University
- Occupations: Actress, singer
- Years active: 2001–present
- Spouse: Colin Follenweider (2006–present)
- Children: 2

Marcie Dodd (born March 10, 1978) is an American musical theatre actress, who is best known for playing Elphaba and Nessarose in various U.S. companies of the smash-hit musical Wicked.

== Early life and career ==
Dodd was born in Yuba City, California, on March 10, 1978, the third of four children. Her father is an agricultural consultant and her mother is a piano teacher. She attended Bethany College in Santa Cruz County, California, with a major in music from 1997 to 1999. In 1999, she transferred to Azusa Pacific University, graduating in 2001. After graduation, she was cast as a singing princess in Disneyland. During a three-year run, she performed as Belle and Snow White. At Disneyland, she met her husband, Colin Follenweider, a Hollywood stunt-double. Together, they have two children.

=== Regional roles ===
Dodd's first non-Disney role was as Sandy in a regional production of Grease. She then took understudy roles in the Las Vegas productions of We Will Rock You and Hairspray, before becoming a cast member of the musical Wicked.

== Wicked ==
Dodd made her Wicked debut on December 5, 2006, as a member of the ensemble of the show's Emerald City Tour. She also understudied the roles of Elphaba and Nessarose. Her first performance as Nessarose was at the matinee on March 25, 2007, in Miami, Florida; her first performance as Elphaba was at the matinee on April 7, 2007, in Houston, Texas. Dodd departed the first national touring company on December 2, 2007, in Hartford, Connecticut.

After a year on tour, she replaced Jenna Leigh Green as the principal Nessarose in the Los Angeles sit-down production. Her first performance took place on December 13, 2007. Due to the injury of fellow cast member Courtney Corey, she temporarily became an understudy for Elphaba, from late March to early May 2008. Her first performance as Elphaba in Los Angeles took place on April 22, 2008. On May 13, 2008, she replaced Teal Wicks as the standby for Elphaba, due to Wicks' promotion to full-time lead. In addition, she returned to understudying Nessarose, with Briana Yacavone replacing her in the lead role. She departed the Los Angeles company on October 26, 2008. Dodd was succeeded by Vicki Noon as the standby to Elphaba.

Dodd then joined the Broadway production at the Gershwin Theatre, replacing Kerry Ellis in the lead role of Elphaba on November 11, 2008. Upon her move to Broadway, Dodd became the first, and only actress to date, to have performed in the lead roles of both Nessarose and Elphaba. She ended her limited Broadway engagement on January 11, 2009, and was replaced by Nicole Parker.

Dodd then originated the role of Elphaba on the Munchkinland Tour of the show, which began performances March 7, 2009, and officially opened March 12. Dodd exited the touring company on April 4, 2010, and was once again succeeded by Vicki Noon.

She then succeeded Eden Espinosa as Elphaba in the San Francisco sit-down production on June 29, 2010. She starred alongside Alli Mauzey as Glinda, and remained with the production until its closing night on September 5, 2010.
