= Kristan =

Kristan is a surname. Notable people with the surname include:

- Etbin Kristan (1867–1953), Slovenian politician and writer
- Marijan Kristan (born 1937), Slovenian ice hockey player
- Robert Kristan (born 1983), Slovenian professional goaltender
- William Kristan, American biologist

== See also ==
- Kristan (given name)
