= Michael Nusbaum =

American Neuroscientist

Michael P. Nusbaum
- Education: University of California, San Diego
- Scientific career
- Fields: Neuromodulation; Neural networks Neuropeptides; Cotransmission
- Workplaces: University of Pennsylvania
- Thesis: Synaptic Activation of Leech Swimming by Identified Serotonin-Containing Neurons (1984)
- Doctoral advisor: William Kristan
- Other academic advisors: Eve Marder
- Website: www.med.upenn.edu/apps/faculty/index.php/g309/p16396

Michael P. Nusbaum is a professor of neuroscience at the Perelman School of Medicine at the University of Pennsylvania. His lab studies the modulation of neural networks using the crab stomatogastric nervous system as a model.

== Education and career ==
Nusbaum obtained his PhD in 1984 under the supervision of William Kristan at the University of California, San Diego, followed by a postdoctoral fellowship in 1985 at Brandeis University with Eve Marder. In 1991, Nusbaum joined the department of physiology and biophysics at the University of Alabama at Birmingham School of Medicine as an assistant professor. He later joined the department of neuroscience at the University of Pennsylvania in 1994 and was promoted to full professor in 2003.
