= Kristan (given name) =

Kristan is a given name. Notable people with the given name include:

- Kristan Bromley (born 1972), British skeleton racer
- Kristan Cunningham, American actress and interior designer
- Kristan Higgins, American author
- Kristan Kennedy (born 1972), American artist, curator, and educator
- Kristan Singleton (born 1971), United States Virgin Islands swimmer
- Kristan Caryl (born 1984), British journalist
- Kristan von Waldenfels (born 2000), German politician

== See also ==
- Kristan, surname
- Krystal (disambiguation)
