= Belita Koiller =

Brazilian physicist

- Education: PhD
- Alma mater: University of California-Berkeley
- Scientific career
- Fields: Physics, Condensed Matter

Belita Koiller is a Brazilian Professor of Physics at the Instituto de Física, Universidade Federal do Rio de Janeiro (UFRJ), Brazil. She is a Condensed Matter Theorist, and has contributed to the understanding of the properties of disordered solids, particularly disordered chains and semiconductor alloys. More recently, she has been interested in quantum control of individual electron spin and charge in semiconductors, aiming at applications in quantum information and quantum computing.

== Career ==
Belita Koiller completed her PhD in theoretical Condensed Matter Physics at the University of California-Berkeley in 1975, under the supervision of Leo Falicov. She then returned to Brazil and joined the Physics Department at the Pontificia Universidade Católica do Rio de Janeiro. She was appointed Full Professor in 1992 and in 1994 she moved to the Physics Institute at Universidade Federal do Rio de Janeiro.

She has been elected three times as a General Councilor of the Brazilian Physical Society (SBF) for 4-year periods starting in 1993, 1999, and 2005. She served for 3 years, since 1994, as a member of the ICSU Committee on Capacity Building in Science. She is a member of the Executive Committee of the International Human Rights Network of Academies and Scholarly Societies since 2005. In 2008, she became a member of the IUPAP Commission on Semiconductors. In 2009, she was elected International Councilor of the American Physical Society Council, serving for two years. In 2010, she was elected Fellow of The World Academy of Sciences (TWAS). Since 2013, she is the vice-president of the Brazilian Physical Society.

Since 2010, she has been an associate editor of the Journal of Applied Physics. She served as editor of the Brazilian Journal of Physics in 1990/1991.

She has participated in the organization of many international conferences. She chaired the IUPAP 29th International Conference on the Physics of Semiconductors, held in Rio de Janeiro in 2008.

== Research ==
As a PhD student, Belita Koiller investigated the electronic properties of transition-metal oxides. Later, she made contributions including the description of electron-atom collisions under laser fields, the electronic structure of disordered chains – including the renormalization group approach to local density of states, defects in alkali halides, magnetic order in potassium cyanide, hydrogen atoms and molecules under magnetic fields, magnon dynamics of disordered magnetic materials, electronic and elastic properties of semiconductor alloys, partially ordered systems, ordered and Fibonacci superlattices, theory of multiphoton transitions in crystals, random motion in networks, laser induced chaos in one dimensional systems and the Tight Binding description of shallow donors in semiconductors.

Since 2001, she has been (and still is) working largely in condensed matter applications to quantum information. Some of her results include the complex role of the valley interference in the spin coupling of pairs of donors in silicon and the mechanisms for controlling the valley degree of freedom in silicon.

== Honours ==
Belita Koiller received a Guggenheim Fellowship in 1981, and four years later she was a Brazilian National Research Council research fellow. In 1995 she was the first woman to join the physicist division of the Brazilian Academy of Sciences. The Brazilian president made her a “Comendador da Ordem Nacional do Mérito Científico” in 2002 and she became a “Grã Cruz da Ordem Nacional do Mérito Científico” in 2010. Belita Koiller was the L’Oréal UNESCO 2005 Laureate for Women in Science. She is an International Councilor for the American Physical Society.
