= Rudolf von Waldenfels =

German writer, journalist and actor (born 1965)

Rudolf Freiherr von Waldenfels
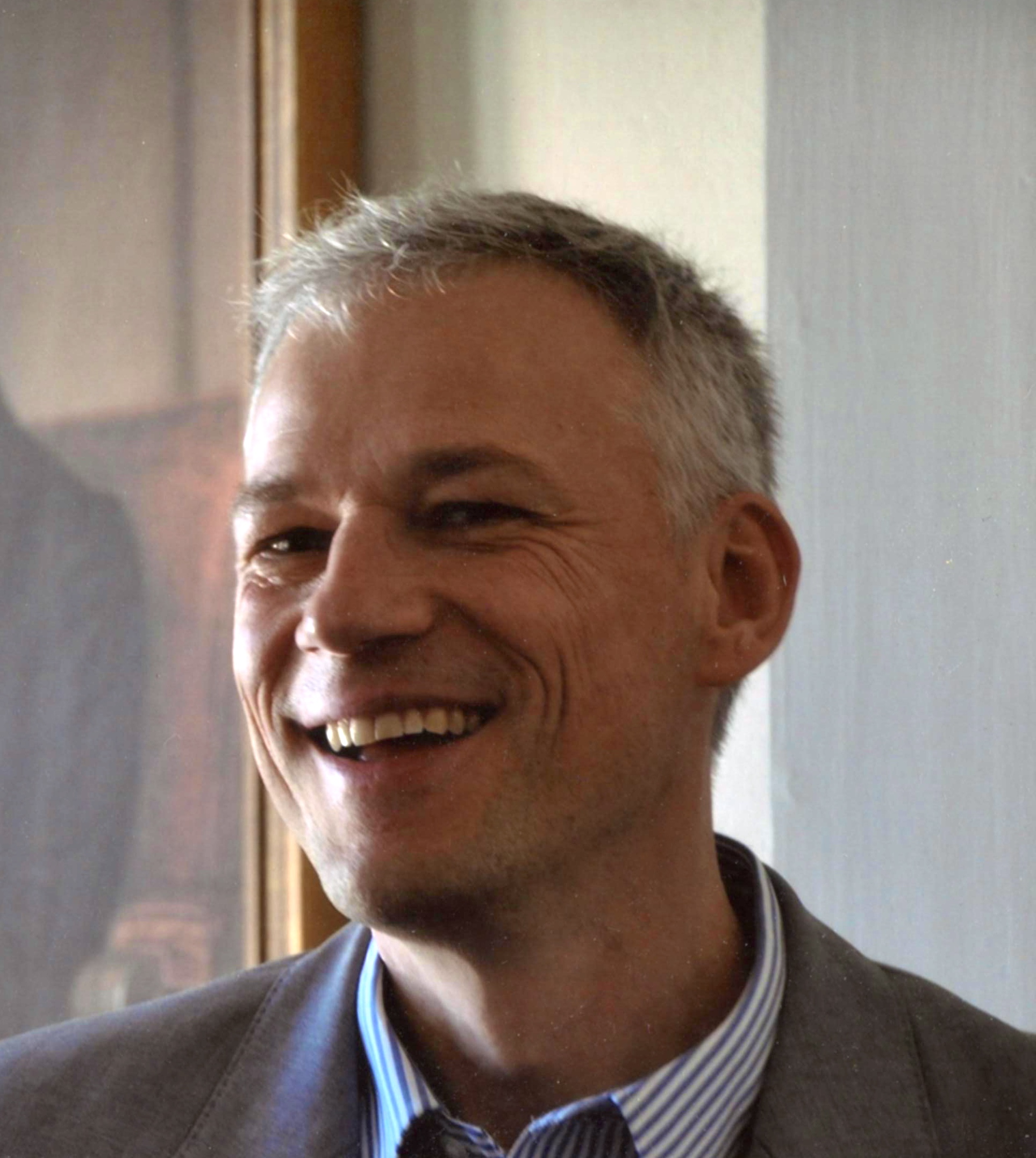
- Born: 26 April 1965 (age 60); Jülich, West Germany
- Occupation(s): Actor, writer
- Children: Kristan von Waldenfels

Rudolf Freiherr von Waldenfels (born 26 April 1965) is a German writer, journalist and actor. He is a member of the Waldenfels family, a German Adelsgeschlecht (noble lineage of Barons) that dates back to the 13th century AD. He lives in Berlin and in his ancestral hometown of Lichtenberg, in Bavaria. He is the grandnephew of Wehrmacht Panzer general Rudolf Freiherr von Waldenfels.

== Biography ==
Raised in Heidelberg, Waldenfels studied theater from 1987 to 1990 at the public College of Music and Performing Arts (Hochschule für Musik und Darstellende Kunst) in Frankfurt am Main. As part of his studies he worked for Claus Peymann at the Burgtheater in Vienna. In 1992 he chose to leave this job to undertake a bicycle trip across Asia that would last several years. His experiences on this trip influenced his first novel Über die Grenze (Over the Border), which was published in 2006 by Mitteldeutscher Verlag and received well by critics.

In 2010 he published Der schwarze Messias: Barack Obama und die gefährliche Sehnsucht nach politischer Erlösung (The Black Messias: Barack Obama and the Dangerous Desire for Political Redemption).
