= Vicki Noon =

American theater performer (born 1985)

- Born: 1985 (age 39–40); Tucson, Arizona, U.S.
- Occupation(s): Actress, singer
- Years active: 1998–present
- Spouse: Dominick Amendum
- Children: 2

Vicki Noon (born 1985) is an American theater performer, who played the lead role of Elphaba on the Second National Tour of Wicked, a role she had previously covered in various other productions of the musical.

== Early life ==
Vicki Noon was born in Tucson, Arizona, and moved with her family at a young age to Washington state. Noon's mother worked in airplane systems at the Federal Aviation Administration and her father is a systems engineer at The Boeing Company; they divorced in 1997. She and her older sister grew up in Newcastle, Washington and Vicki studied at the Washington Academy of Performing Arts. In 1998, at the age of 13, Noon appeared as the title character in Violet at Seattle's A Contemporary Theater.

Noon was a high school classmate and childhood friend of San Francisco Giants pitcher Tim Lincecum, the National League Cy Young winner from 2008 and 2009.

Noon played the principal role of Sophie on the 2007 North American tour of Mamma Mia!. She also appeared as Demeter on the national tour of Cats. She was one of the show's "stand-outs with their expressive song and dance routines."

== Wicked ==
Noon first appeared in the Chicago production of Wicked from April 2008, as a member of the ensemble and understudy for Elphaba. Her first performance as Elphaba took place on July 19, 2008.

She was then asked to join the Los Angeles production as the standby Elphaba, and replaced Marcie Dodd on November 4, 2008. She continued to stand by for Eden Espinosa until the show left Hollywood on January 11, 2009.

Noon then transferred to San Francisco, where she was the standby for Teal Wicks. Previews began, with Noon stepping in as Elphaba for an ill Wicks, on January 27, 2009. Opening night took place on February 6. From the end of March 2009 until early May, she became the temporary lead Elphaba, while Teal Wicks was on an extended leave of absence.

Noon departed S.F. on March 7, 2010, and replaced Marcie Dodd as the lead Elphaba on the second North American Tour from April 6, 2010. She starred opposite Natalie Daradich as Glinda. Noon played her final performance on January 23, 2011 in her hometown of Tucson, Arizona and was replaced by standby Anne Brummel. Noon began performances on August 14, 2012 as a member of the ensemble and understudy for Elphaba in the musical's Broadway production, replacing former Elphaba understudy Caroline Bowman.

Noon most recently performed as a standby for all the female roles in the Broadway production of First Date.
