= Bethany University =

Christian university in Scotts Valley, California

Coordinates: 37.075°N 121.994°W

- Motto: Wisdom Word Spirit
- Type: Private coeducational; Undergraduate & Graduate
- Active: 1919–2011
- Affiliations: Assemblies of God USA
- Location: 800 Bethany Drive, Scotts Valley, CA 95066, U.S.
- Campus: Suburban
- Colors: Burgundy and Vegas Gold
- Mascot: Bruins
- Website: www.bethany.edu

Bethany University was a four-year private coeducational Christian university located in Scotts Valley, California, in Santa Cruz County. It operated from 1919 until closing in 2011 and was endorsed by the Assemblies of God USA, a Pentecostal denomination, and was the denomination's oldest college at the time of its closure. It was formerly called Glad Tidings Bible Institute, Bethany Bible College and Bethany College.

== History ==
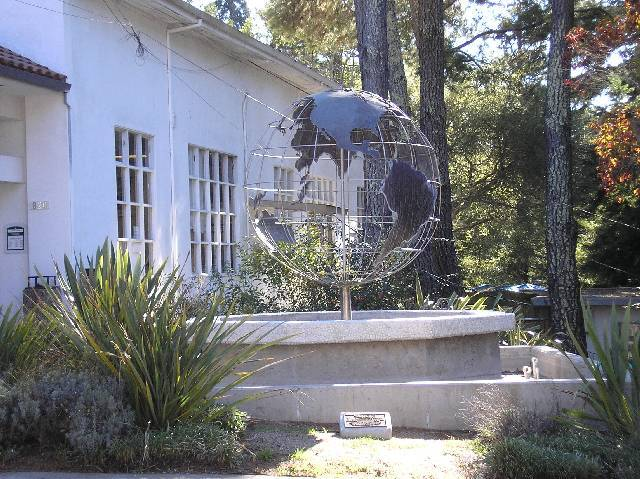
World Missions Globe outside the library at Bethany University

Bethany University was the oldest of several Assemblies of God institutions of higher education. It was founded in 1919 as Glad Tidings Bible Institute at 1280 Webster Street, San Francisco, to be the training school for an inner-city ministry conducted by Robert and Mary Craig. It moved to Scotts Valley in 1950, and in 1955 became Bethany Bible College and in 2005 to Bethany University.

Enrollment during the 2010–11 academic year was down to approximately 400 students, a decrease from over 500 in previous years. The university also reduced the number of its faculty to 22 full-time and 50 adjunct faculty in its final years. On June 13, 2011, the university announced that it would close effective immediately for reasons of finances and low enrollment.

Not long after the closure announcement, a San Francisco-based Christian institution, Olivet University, announced that it would lease the Bethany campus and hold its classes there, with the intent of acquiring both the Bethany campus and the nearby former headquarters complex of Borland Software for its worldwide headquarters, but those deals fell through by May 2012; Olivet vacated the Bethany campus at that time and remains based in San Francisco. The Bethany campus buildings and grounds were put up for sale by the regional leadership of the Assemblies of God denomination. It has been rebuilt as the site of 1440 Multiversity, a health and wellness retreat and education center run by the 1440 Foundation, which was started by Joanie and Scott Kriens.

== Academics and accreditation ==
The university offered a number of undergraduate programs in Addiction Studies, Biblical and Theological Studies, Business Administration, Child Development, Church Leadership, Communication, English, Liberal Arts, Liberal Studies, Music, Organizational Management, Psychology, Social Science, Sports Management, Teacher Preparation, and Youth Ministries Leadership, and five graduate degrees, Master of Arts in Christian Ministry, Master of Arts in Business Administration, Master of Arts in education, Master of Science in psychology, and Master of Arts in Teaching. Bethany University was accredited by the Western Association of Schools and Colleges (WASC) through August 11, 2011.

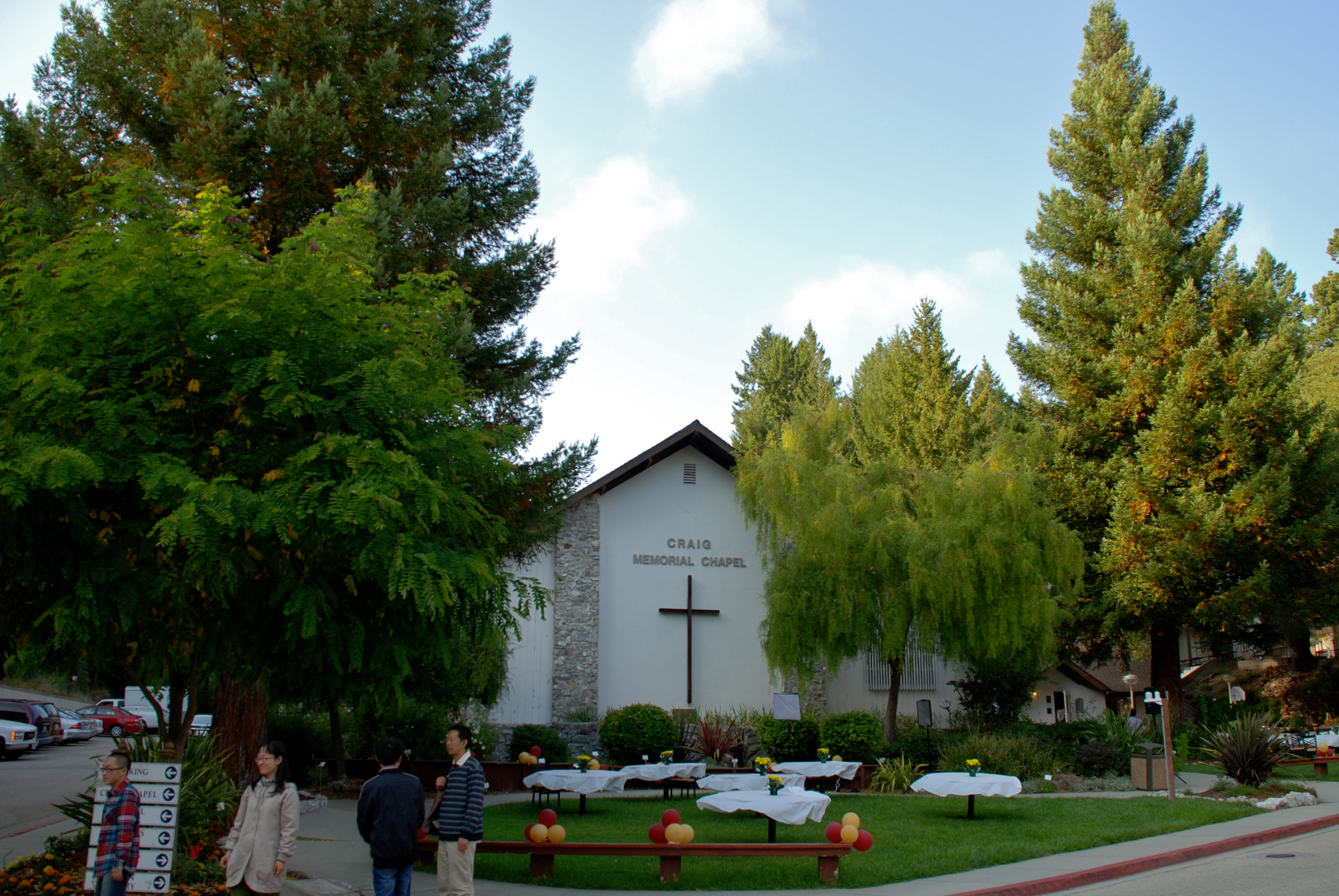
Craig Chapel

== Academic Presidents ==
- Robert Craig, 1919–1941
- J. Narver Gortner, 1941–1947
- W. T. Gaston, 1947–1948
- Otis W. Keyes, 1948–1950
- W. T. Gaston, 1950–1952
- T. A. Kessell, 1952–1955
- Leland R. Keyes, 1955–1959
- Cordas C. Burnett, 1959–1972
- Elmer Kirsch, 1972–1973
- C. M. Ward, 1973–1978
- Richard Foth, 1978–1992
- Tommy L. Duncan, 1992–1997
- Everett Wilson, 1997–2003
- Maximo Rossi Jr., 2003–2009
- Lew Shelton, 2009–2011

== Dormitories ==
=== Cordas C. Burnett Hall ===
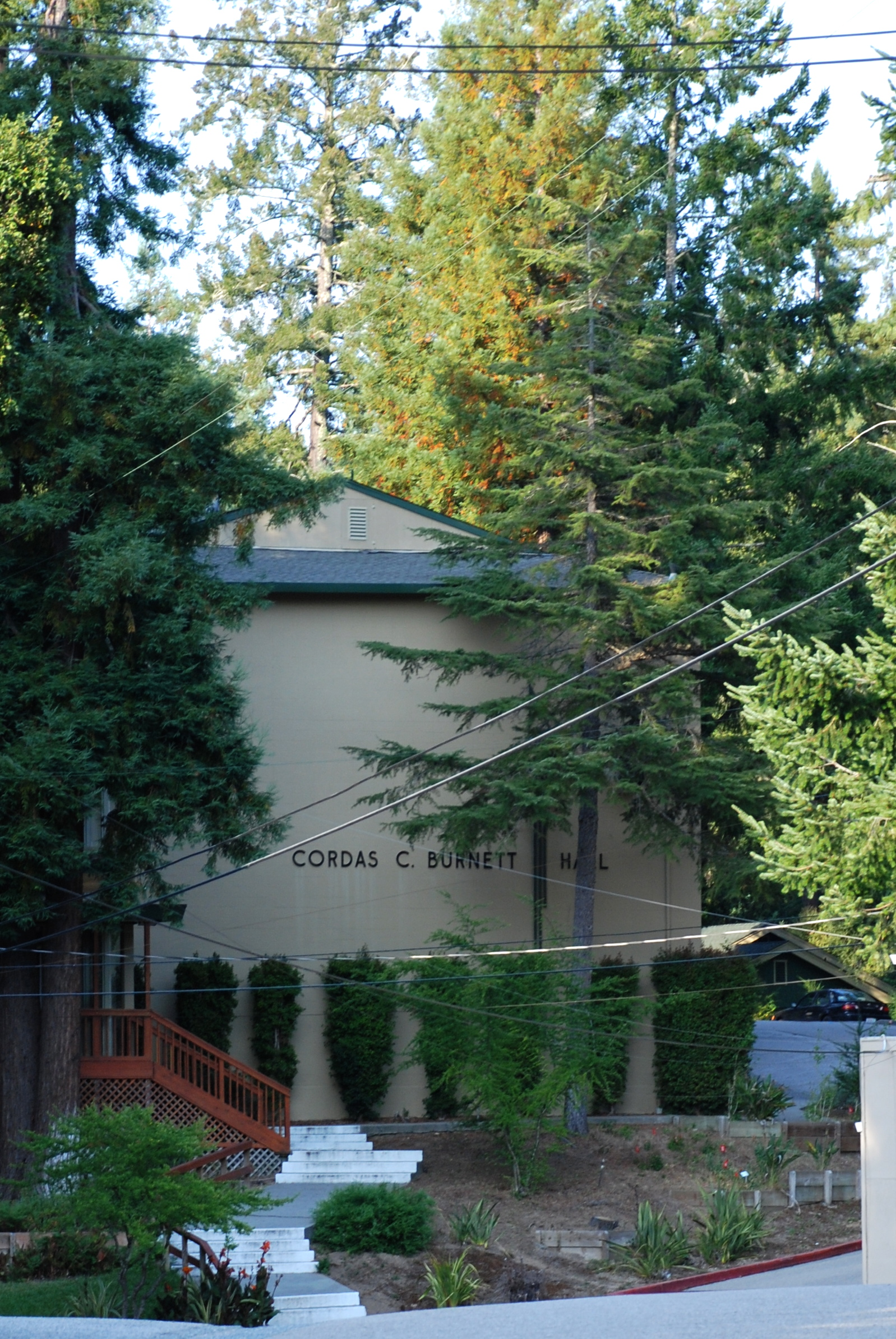
Cordas C. Burnett Hall

Cordas C. Burnett Hall was a three-story men's dormitory on the northeast side of the Bethany University campus, named in honor of the previous college president. The southwest side of each floor housed a common area for students to gather and watch television. The hall had a communal "gang" shower area. The dormitory contained rooms which housed four students which shared a communal desk located in the center of the room.

=== May V. Swanson Hall ===
Swanson Hall was one of the main women's dormitories on the Bethany campus. Swanson was divided into four halls: Circus Hall, Unity Hall, Victory Hall, and Miracle Hall. The dormitory was located in the center of the campus.

=== The Hill ===
Two women's dormitories were located on "The Hill": Gerhart Hall and Harp Hall. Each had two floors and contained four suites with five rooms.

== Athletics ==
The Bethany athletic teams were called the Bruins. The university was a member of the National Association of Intercollegiate Athletics (NAIA), primarily competing in the California Pacific Conference (Cal Pac) from 1996–97 to 2010–11 (when the school closed).

Bethany competed in eight intercollegiate varsity sports: Men's sports included basketball, cross country and soccer; while women's sports include basketball, cross country, soccer, softball and volleyball.

== Notable alumni ==
- Ron Anderson, singer on The Lawrence Welk Show
- Marcie Dodd, actress
- Jon Pritikin, motivational speaker
