= Pritikin diet =

Low-fat, high-fiber diet

The Pritikin diet is a low-fat, high-fiber diet which forms part of the "Pritikin Program for Diet and Exercise", a lifestyle regimen originally created by Nathan Pritikin. The 1979 book describing the diet became a best-seller.

== Reception ==
The diet is based around eating low-fat, high-fiber foods and limiting red meat, alcohol, and processed food. When it was launched, the diet was considered radical, but its precepts are now largely in alignment with mainstream nutritional advice. The Pritikin Diet has been categorized as a fad diet with possible disadvantages including a boring food choice, flatulence, and the risk of feeling too hungry.

Gastroenterologist David Hershel Alpers and colleagues described the Pritikin diet as "nutritionally adequate, but the low fat content makes it unpalatable, and the likelihood of compliance is low."

== See also ==
- List of diets
