= Teal Wicks =

American singer and stage actress (born 1982)

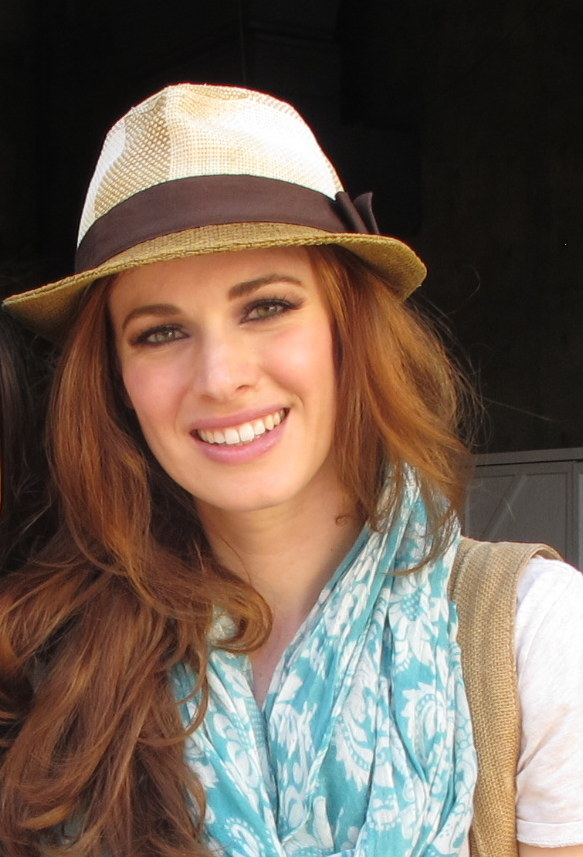

Background information
- Born: September 8, 1982 (age 44); Sacramento, California, U.S.
- Occupations: Singer; actress
- Website: www.facebook.com/TealWicks

Teal Wicks (born September 8, 1982 in Sacramento, California) is an American singer and stage actress, who is best known for her performances as Elphaba in the Broadway, San Francisco, and Los Angeles productions of the musical Wicked and as Mary Barrie in the musical Finding Neverland.

Wicks played the role of Emma Carew, Dr. Jekyll's fiancée, in the 2013 Broadway revival of Jekyll & Hyde. She also starred as Lady in The Cher Show at the Neil Simon Theatre on Broadway for the entirety of its run, from October 2018 to August 2019 and Anne Hathaway in & Juliet on Broadway from November 2025 to February 2026.

== Education ==
Wicks attended Natomas High School in Sacramento, California. She graduated from UC Irvine in 2005 with a degree in Drama and Honors in Musical Theatre. She was active in the UCI Theatre program and had lead roles in productions including Chicago, Hair, and Cabaret. She is also a member of Kappa Alpha Theta at UCI.

On May 12, 2011, Wicks was feted by the UCI Alumni Association along with other distinguished individuals during the 41st annual Lauds & Laurels ceremony held at the Hyatt Regency Irvine. She was conferred the honor of Distinguished Alumna of the Claire Trevor School of the Arts.

Wicks serves on the advisory board of the California State Summer School for the Arts.

== Wicked ==
=== Wicked in Los Angeles ===
Wicks was cast as the standby for Elphaba in the Los Angeles production of the musical Wicked during the fall of 2007, after six auditions for multiple roles with several Wicked productions. She officially took over the standby role on January 1, 2008, with her first performance taking place on January 9. On May 13, 2008, she was offered to take over the lead role of Elphaba from Caissie Levy in the Los Angeles production.

During her five months as Elphaba, she performed alongside Megan Hilty, Erin Mackey, and Emily Rozek as Glinda. Her final performance was on October 29, 2008; however, on that day, she left mid-performance after the train station scene because she was sick. As a result, Angel Reda, her understudy, took over for the remainder of the show. Original Los Angeles cast member Eden Espinosa replaced Wicks in the role on Halloween. Wicked Los Angeles closed on January 11, 2009, and was one of the most financially successful musicals in Los Angeles theatre history.

=== Wicked in San Francisco ===
Wicked co-creator Stephen Schwartz said in a 2009 interview that his team had assembled an "all-star line-up, in terms of people who have really done a good job and scored very well in their roles in these other cities" for the newly planned San Francisco production of Wicked. Wicks was chosen to originate the role of Elphaba, and co-lead Kendra Kassebaum was chosen to originate the role of Glinda. The San Francisco production opened on February 6, 2009.

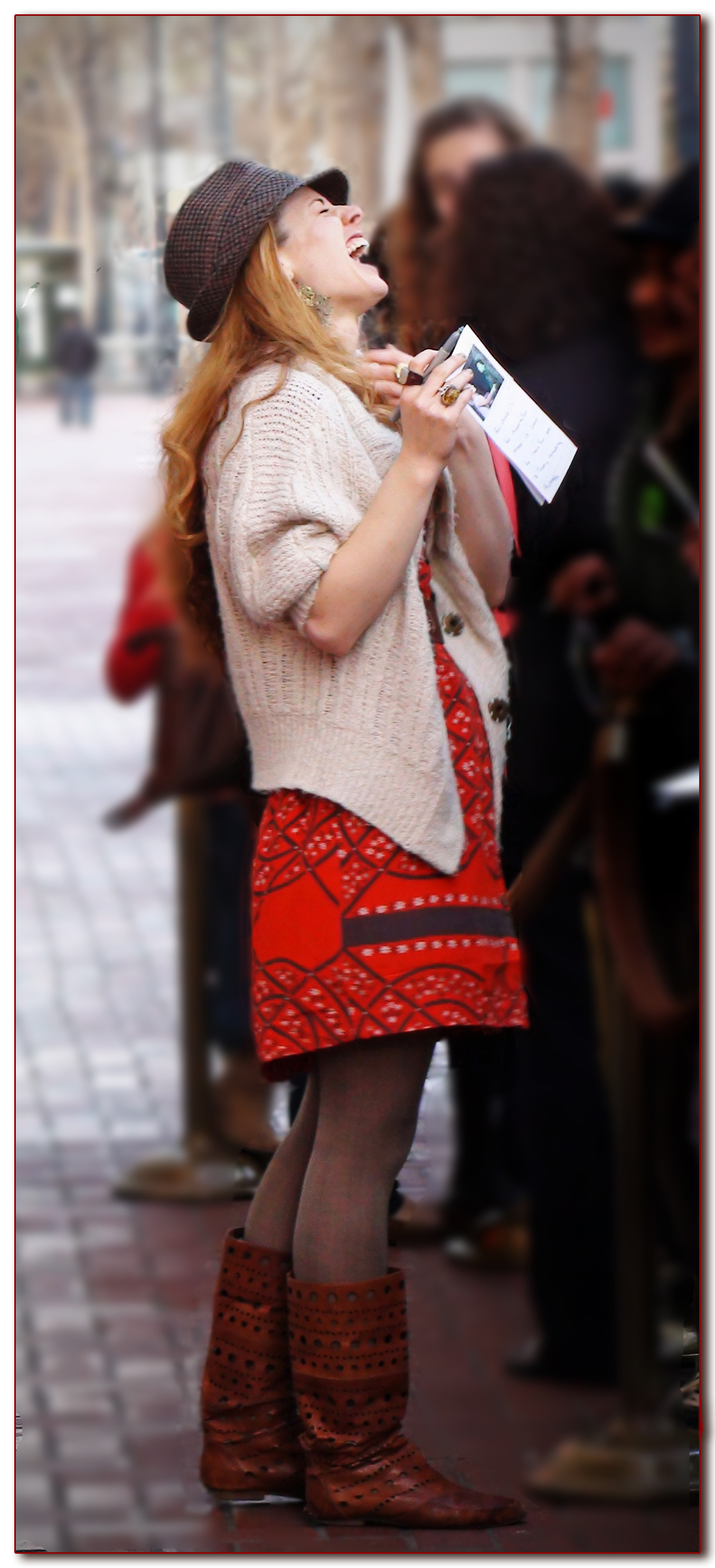
Teal Wicks

==== Reception ====
The San Francisco production of Wicked received critical acclaim from audiences.

The San Francisco Chronicle:

"This Sacramento native (Wicks) is dynamite in the talent department, with a soaring singing voice and a way of balancing her character's vulnerability and wickedness. It's the performance that really defines this particular production."

The Contra Costa Times:

"The cast, particularly Wicks and Kassebaum, is outstanding. The two leads are flat-out incredible, with voices that must be heard to be believed and acting chops that squeeze every bit of nuance out of the material created".

The San Francisco Examiner:

"Teal Wicks plays the role with incredible heart, showing with both subtlety and all-out emotion how the slighted girl born with green skin is simply misunderstood."

==== Further information ====
Wicks performed during the production with both Academy Award-winner Patty Duke and Emmy Award-winner Carol Kane, both as Madame Morrible. Wicks also performed alongside Natalie Daradich and Libby Servais (standbys) and Alexa Green (understudy) as Glinda. Wicks was on leave from the production from the end of March until early May 2009, during which the role was covered by Vicki Noon.

The Wicked San Francisco production was seen by nearly one million people during its first year, according to The Best of Broadway, and averaged over $1.0 million in weekly grosses at the box office, according to Variety Magazine. Wicked was named "Musical of the Decade" during 2009 by Entertainment Weekly.

Wicks played her final performance as Elphaba on February 28, 2010, after performing the role over 500 times during a two-year period between the Los Angeles and San Francisco productions. Eden Espinosa replaced her a second time, the first being in L.A.

Wicks' performance in San Francisco won her many fans and inspired the San Francisco-based Wicked fan group known as "the TWickies" (the name coming from "T.Wicks"). The TWickies were die-hard fans of Wicked in San Francisco even after Wicks' departure and remain loyal followers of her career today.

Wicks was chosen as the "Favorite Elphaba", among all the actresses who have played the role, in an online February 2010 poll with over 65,000 voters.

An online poll was conducted in December 2010 to vote for Who is the "Wicked" Personality of the Year. Wicks has been awarded after winning the poll with over 20,000 votes (42%), leading by almost 8,000 votes.

=== Wicked on Broadway ===
On February 2, 2011, Wicks made her Broadway debut replacing Mandy Gonzalez as Elphaba in Wicked at the Gershwin Theatre. She starred alongside Katie Rose Clarke as Glinda for her seven-month run, which came to an end on September 25. She and Clarke were replaced by Jackie Burns and Chandra Lee Schwartz, respectively, as Elphaba and Glinda.

== Broadway credits ==
=== Wicked Broadway ===
Wicks appeared in the Broadway production of Wicked in the lead role of Elphaba. She made her Broadway debut on February 1, 2011, replacing Mandy Gonzalez in the role. Wicks departed the role on September 25, 2011, along with co-star Katie Rose Clarke. They were succeeded by Jackie Burns and Chandra Lee Schwartz. Wicks performed the role on Broadway for nearly eight months, whereas Clarke will have appeared as Glinda for nearly two years.

Wicks was named Broadway's Hottest Girl 2011 alongside Aaron Tveit as Broadway's Hottest Guy 2011 in an online poll, over 10,000 votes were cast.

=== Jekyll & Hyde: The Musical ===
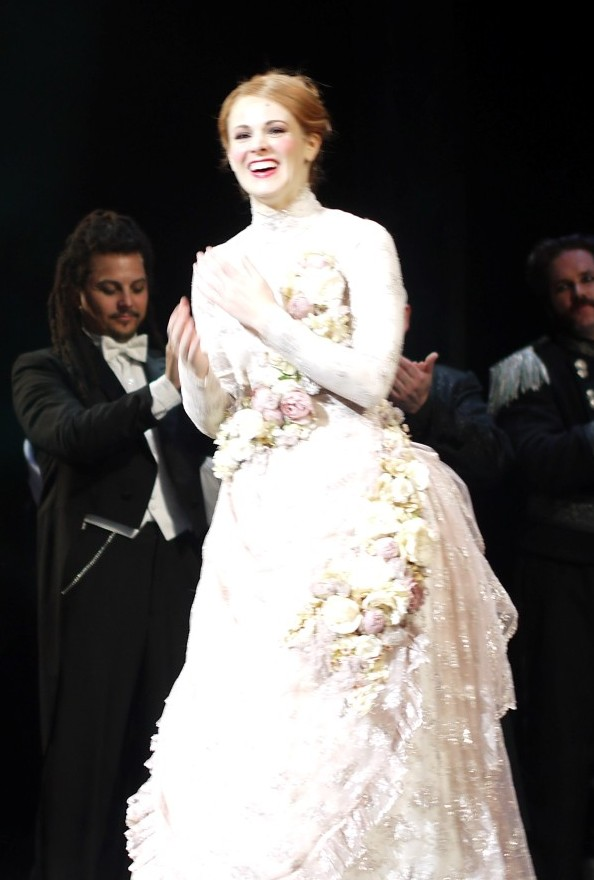
Teal Wicks as Emma Carew

Wicks starred as Emma Carew, Dr. Jekyll's fiancée, in the Broadway revival of Jekyll & Hyde alongside Tony-nominee and former American Idol contestant Constantine Maroulis in the title role, and R&B superstar Deborah Cox as Lucy Harris. The new production began previews on Broadway at the Marquis Theatre on April 5, 2013, and officially opened on April 18, 2013. It closed on May 12, 2013. ahead of its scheduled 13-week run. Prior to the Broadway opening, the show went on a 25-week national tour that began previews in La Mirada, California, on September 7, 2012.

=== Finding Neverland ===
Teal Wicks played Mary Barrie in the musical Finding Neverland from its premiere in March 2015 until its closing in August 2016. The musical is based on the Miramax motion picture by David Magee and the play The Man Who Was Peter Pan by Allan Knee, which followed the relationship between playwright J. M. Barrie, played by Matthew Morrison, and the family that inspired Peter Pan. The production was directed by Tony Award-winner Diane Paulus with book by Olivier Award nominee James Graham, music and lyrics by U.K. pop sensation Gary Barlow and Grammy Award-winner Eliot Kennedy, and choreography by Emmy Award-winner Mia Michaels. It starred Emmy Award-winner Kelsey Grammer as Charles Frohman, Olivier Award-winner Laura Michelle Kelly as Sylvia Llewlyn Davies, and Tony Award-nominee Carolee Carmello as Madame Du Maurier.

=== The Cher Show ===
In April 2018, it was announced that Wicks would join Stephanie J. Block and Micaela Diamond as the three actors to play singer Cher in The Cher Show. The show had a pre-Broadway engagement in Chicago at the Oriental Theatre, beginning on June 12, 2018, and running through July 15. The production then opened on Broadway at the Neil Simon Theatre on December 3, 2018, and played its final performance on August 18, 2019.

== Off-Broadway credits ==
=== The Blue Flower - Second Stage Theatre Production ===
Wicks reprised her role as Maria in an Off-Broadway production of The Blue Flower at Second Stage Theatre in the fall of 2011. Previews began on October 14, 2011, and the production opened on November 9, 2011. Costarring in the show were Meghan McGeary, who also reprised her role, Marc Kudisch, Sebastian Arcelus, Joseph Medeiros, Julia Osborne, Graham Rowat, and Aaron Serotsky. The show ran until November 27, 2011.

Reviews:

Back Stage:

"Wicks soars on the moving Act 1 closer, "Eiffel Tower," in which Maria deals with Franz's death" "I particularly loved an icy, regimented Charleston danced by a grieving black-clad Maria"

Variety:

"Teal Wicks, a replacement Elphaba in Wicked, is a wonderful find as Maria; she closes the first act with an exquisite solo, Eiffel Tower, and combines well with Arcelus for Love."

The Official Blog of the Arts Initiative at Columbia University:

Quoted, "I have to say, though, as far as singing goes, Teal Wicks absolutely stole the show with this virtuosic performance. Overall, head voice, chest voice & mix are each beautifully developed in Ms. Wicks, but the truly impressive part is how effortlessly she weaves back and forth between them. Sometimes I heard elements of all three registrations at different points within the same word. She has truly mastered the many facets of her voice, and it is that facility that allows her to be as expressive as she is. With an instrument as refined and capable as hers, she can fully embody musical phrases with all the subtext and emotion of the composer & lyricist's intentions. She has a myriad of vocal tools at her disposal and is a true virtuoso with each one. It is not every day that I see singers with such versatility and mastery of the subtleties of the human voice. I'm certain we can expect many more great things from Ms. Wicks in the future."

New York Times:

"Teal Wicks, as Maria, sings with an expressiveness and richness of tone that enchants"

Time Out New York:

"Wicks is poised to emerge as a major star"

History News Network:

Bruce Chadwick says, "The strength of The Blue Flower is the talented ensemble cast of Sebastian Arcelus (Franz), Marc Kudisch (Max), Meghan McGeary (Hannah) and Teal Wicks (Maria). They are good actors and good singers (especially Wicks). Wicks sings a soulful ballad at the end of act one, from on top of the Eiffel Tower, that's dazzling."

=== Piece of My Heart: The Bert Berns Story ===
Teal Wicks was cast to play the young Ilene Berns, in the musical Piece of My Heart: The Bert Berns Story, a new musical based on the life and songs of legendary songwriter Bert Berns that opened Off-Broadway July 21, 2014.

Piece of My Heart, according to press notes, "tells his remarkable story, once dubbed by Rolling Stone 'one of the great untold stories of rock and roll,' through his hit songs, which include 'Twist and Shout,' 'Tell Him,' 'I Want Candy,' 'Hang On Sloopy,' 'Cry Baby' and many more."

Featuring a book by Daniel Goldfarb and direction and choreography by Denis Jones, Piece of My Heart began previews June 25, 2014, at The Irene Diamond Stage at The Pershing Square Signature Center.

== Regional credits ==
=== Pippin ===
Wicks performed in the lead role of Catherine for the 2006-2007 National Tour of Stephen Schwartz's musical Pippin, a role that she also reprised at the Goodspeed Opera House.

=== The Blue Flower - American Repertory Theater Production ===
From December 2010 through January 8, 2011, Wicks played the role of Maria in American Repertory Theater's The Blue Flower. According to A.R.T., "The Blue Flower rides the twisted rails of history and the tangled love interests of three artists and a scientist, from Paris during the Belle Epoque, through the battlefields of the Great War and beyond."

It is inspired by the lives of historical figures Max Beckmann, Franz Marc, Hannah Höch, and Marie Curie.

This is the first and so far only musical that Stephen Schwartz is producing. According to Schwartz "The Blue Flower is the most creative and original piece of musical theater that I have ever encountered in my life. The story is beautiful, relevant, and compelling for our times. The music is amazingly accessible." And when asked about his producing venture he replied "Yes. It's my first and probably my only one. In other words, I am doing this not because I want to be a producer, but because this particular show is something that I believe in and want to bring to other people."

Wicks's performance received positive reviews from critics, who frequently highlighted her vocal delivery and chemistry with co-star Lucas Kavner. Reviewers for *TheaterMania* and *Dig Boston* noted that Wicks and Kavner's portrayal of the central lovers formed the emotional core of the production, praising Wicks's ability to convey deep sorrow. Her performance of the ballad "Eiffel Tower" received particular praise; *The Boston Globe* described her rendition as "wrenchingly heartfelt,". Additionally, critics commended her "sweet and soulful" vocals across the show's soundtrack, with *The Patriot Ledger* calling her performance of "(Let It) Slide Through Your Hands" a highlight and suggesting the cast assemble for a formal recording.

Wicks was recognized for her work as Maria by the BroadwayWorld community. She was voted as 2011 BroadwayWorld Boston Award for Best Actress in a Musical. The Blue Flower won Best Musical, Will Pomerantz for Best Direction of a Musical and Daniel Jenkins for Best Actor in a Musical.

She was nominated for an IRNE Award for Best Actress by the 2011 Independent Reviewers of New England (IRNE) in February 2011. She was also nominated for Outstanding Musical Performance at the 2011 Elliot Norton Awards, which recognize excellence in Greater Boston Theater. Although she did not win the individual award, The Blue Flower took home the Best Musical award plus five others during IRNE award ceremonies held on April 25, 2011, at the Boston for the Arts Cyclorama. The show also took home Outstanding Local Musical Production and Outstanding Design (Large Theater) at the Elliot Norton Awards held last May 23, 2011.

=== Carousel ===
Teal Wicks starred as Julie Jordan in Goodspeed Musicals production of Rodgers and Hammerstein Carousel. Carousel began its previews on July 13, 2012, at the Goodspeed Opera House in Connecticut; it opened on August 1, 2012. The show was well received by critics and Broadway.com gave it a big thumbs up. Wicks left the show on August 5th to start rehearsal for the Broadway-bound national tour revival of Jekyll & Hyde as Emma Carew. She was replaced by Erin Davie.

Wicks won Best Actress in a Musical at the 2012 BroadwayWorld Connecticut Awards for her portrayal as Julie Jordan.

Reviews:

TheaterMania:

"As Julie, Teal Wicks conveys so much character succinctly and clearly, but does so with a wonderfully real sense of no-nonsense, New England restraint. As the plot unfolds, and Julie's relationship with Billy undergoes an increasingly dire set of challenges, Wicks allows the emotion of her character to radiate from within. "

Connecticut Critics Circle:

"As Julie, Teal Wicks is a stunner. Her performance is heartbreaking in all of the right ways... terrifically balanced sense of fragility and steel."

Broadway.com:

"Snyder is a standout in a cast filled with top-notch players, including wonderful Wicked girl Teal Wicks as Julie Jordan"

The Wall Street Journal:

"..Julie Jordan initially played by the excellent Teal Wicks"

In the Spotlight:

"Teal Wicks brings a unique, straight forward, Yankee, sensibility to Julie but her lovely voice is underserved by the score."

Examiner.com by Andrew Beck:

"Wicks, invests her Julie with just the right combination of innocence and strength, delineating her character's tentative flirtation with the danger that Billy represents along with her growing determination to at last seek something that she deeply desires. She possesses a lovely, sound singing voice that can fill with passion for "If I Loved You" or assert itself ironically in "What's the Use of Wondrin'." She's also able to subsequently depict Julie's world-weariness as the musical jumps ahead 15 years in its later scenes, as well as an enduring connection to her true love."

Hartford Courant:

"Wicks' Julie is a fine match and creates a self-possessed, but also insecure, character who you believe can fall in love in an instant, stay with such a damaged husband, and persevere with an inner strength and peace."

Times Square Chronicles:

"Julie, at the performance I saw, was sung and acted beautifully by Teal Wicks. Wicks and Snyder are tenderly believable in their "If I Loved You" duet."

Post-Chronicle:

"Miss Wicks is especially good at making sure Julie never comes off as a victim in what is, essentially, domestic abuse from Billy. Wicks successfully demonstrates the steel spine beneath the warm humanity and delicacy of her character."

=== The Ballad Of Little Jo ===
Teal Wicks starred as Josephine/Jo Monaghan in "The Ballad Of Little Jo" held in Two River Theater (Red Bank, NJ) on June 3–25, 2017. A cast album was released on November 12, 2017.

=== Les Misérables ===
Wicks starred as Fantine in the Muny production of Les Misérables from June 17-23, 2024.

== Additional theatre ==
In 2006, Wicks performed in the New York Premier of Fahrenheit 451 as Clarisse. In 2007, she appeared in the New York City Center Encores! production of Stairway to Paradise. Wicks originated the role of Turandot in the World Premier of Turandot: The Rumble for the Ring at the Bay Street Theatre. She also appeared in 1776 as Martha Jefferson at the Goodspeed Opera House. She was also involved in the reading of The $trip, a dance musical which features music and lyrics by Lance Horne.

In between her engagements with Wicked LA and SF, Wicks participated in a workshop for Prometheus Bound in New York, playing the role of "IO". Prometheus Bound is a rock-infused musical from Spring Awakening's Tony-winning lyricist and book writer Steven Sater.

Wicks starred in Most Likely to Die: A Slasher Musical, as part of New York Musical Festival's 2010 Developmental Series.

== Theatre credits ==
Year	Title	Role	Theatre	Director(s)	Note(s)	Ref.
2006	Fahrenheit 451	Clarisse	59E59 Theaters	Joe Tantalo	New York Premiere	
2006	Waiting on the Z Train	Madison	59E59 Theaters, The Gershwin Hotel			
2006-07	Pippin	Catherine	National Tour, Goodspeed Opera House, East Haddam, CT	Gabriel Barre		
2007	Nerve Ensemble's The $trip	Bride	Ohio Theatre			
2007	Stairway to Paradise	Ensemble	New York City Center	Jerry Zaks	Encores! Production	
2007	1776	Martha Jefferson	Goodspeed Opera House, East Haddam, CT	Rob Ruggiero		
2007	Turandot: The Rumble for the Ring	Turandot	Bay Street Theater, Sag Harbor, NY	Diane Paulus		
2008	Wicked	Elphaba (standby)	Pantages Theatre	Joe Mantello	Los Angeles production	
2008	Wicked	Elphaba (replacement)	Pantages Theatre	Joe Mantello	Los Angeles production	
2008	Prometheus Bound	IO	American Repertory Theater, Cambridge, MA	Lance Horne	Workshop	
2009-10	Wicked	Elphaba	Orpheum Theatre	Joe Mantello	San Francisco production	
2010	Most Likely to Die: A Slasher Musical	Jenny	Theatre at St. Clement's	Elizabeth Lucas	New York Musical Theatre Festival production	
2010-11	The Blue Flower	Maria	American Repertory Theater, Cambridge, MA	Will Pomerantz	Won - 2011 BroadwayWorld Boston Award for Best Actress in a Musical; Nominated - 2011 Independent Reviewers of New England (IRNE) Award for Best Actress; Nominated - 2011 Elliot Norton Award for Outstanding Musical Performance	
2011	Home Front		Breaking Bread Theatre		Reading	
2011	Wired	Evelyn/Princess	Ars Nova	Mike Donahue	Reading	
2011	Wicked	Elphaba	Gershwin Theatre	Joe Mantello	Broadway debut	
2011	The Blue Flower	Maria	Second Stage Theater	Will Pomerantz		
2011	The Unsinkable Molly Brown	Julia		Kathleen Marshall	Reading, Roundabout Theatre Company	
2012	String	Goddess Atropos			Reading, New Dramatists	
2012	Queen Mother	Hannah Chaplin			Reading	
2012	Carousel	Julie Jordan	Goodspeed Opera House	Rob Ruggiero	Won - 2012 BroadwayWorld Connecticut Award for Best Actress in a Musical; Nominated - 2012-13 Connecticut Critics Circle Award for Outstanding Leading Actress	
2012-13	Jekyll & Hyde	Emma Carew	National Tour	Jeff Calhoun	Runner-up - 2013 Ticketholder Award for Best Supporting Actress	
2013	Jekyll & Hyde	Emma Carew	Marquis Theatre	Jeff Calhoun	Broadway; Nominated - 2012-13 BroadwayWorld Award for Best Featured Actress in a Musical	
2013	Tales from the Bad Years	Julie			Reading, Collaborative Arts Project 21	
2013	Caesar's Wife		Peter Jay Sharp Theatre, Symphony Space	Ben West	World premiere, one-night-only concert	
2013	Brother Russia	Sofya/Anastasia		Steve Bebout	Reading, New 42nd Street Studios	
2013	Nicholas & Alexandra	Olga Romanov		Steve Bebout	Reading	
2014	Piece of My Heart: The Bert Berns Story	Young Ilene Berns	Irene Diamond Stage at the Pershing Square Signature Center	Denis Jones	Off-Broadway	
2014	Mata Hari	Mata Hari			Reading	
2015	Jekyll & Hyde	Emma Carew		Christopher Renshaw	Reading, in preparation for 25th Anniversary International Production	
2015	Finding Neverland	Mary Barrie	Lunt-Fontanne Theatre	Diane Paulus	Broadway; Nominated - 2015 Broadway.com Audience Choice Awards Favorite Featured Actress in a Musical	
2015	The Ballad of Little Jo	Josephine Monaghan/Jo	Two River Theatre	John Dias	Nominated - 2015 Broadway.com Audience Choice Awards Favorite Featured Actress in a Musical	
2018	The Cher Show	Lady	Oriental Theatre	Jason Moore		
2018-2019	The Cher Show	Lady	Neil Simon Theatre	Jason Moore	Broadway; Nominated - 2020 Broadway World Theatre Fans' Choice Award Best Featured Performer in a Musical of the Decade	
2022	Carousel	Julie Jordan	Wells Fargo Pavilion	Allen Cornell		
2023	Rent	Maureen	Wells Fargo Pavilion	Michael Arden		
2023-2024	Ragtime	Mother	Signature Theatre	Matthew Gardiner		
2024	Les Misérables	Fantine	The Muny	Seth Sklar-Heyn		
2024-2025	& Juliet	Anne Hathaway	North American tour	Luke Sheppard		
2025–2026	& Juliet	Anne Hathaway	Stephen Sondheim Theatre	Luke Sheppard	Broadway	

== Charity appearances & performances ==
Date	Event	Notes
December 4, 2017	the shards of an honor code junkie	Metropolitan Baptist Church (New York City), NY
April 12, 2015	Teal Wicks & Friends Sing Harold Arlen	54 Below, NY
March 30, 2015	Broadway's Future Songbook concert	Lincoln Center's Bruno Walter Auditorium, NY
February 21, 2015	54 Sings Heart	54 Below, NY
June 30, 2014	Frank & Friends: Girls Night Out! To benefit The Actors Fund	Birdland NYC
June 6, 2014	Todd Ellison & Friends : The Romance of Broadway	Harris Center, CA
May 8, 2014	Teal Wicks' Solo Show at 54 Below	54 Below, NY
April 28, 2014	The Cutting Room Presents: Michael Heiztman and Ilene Reid	The Cutting Room, NY
April 24, 2014	Putting the Pieces Together: Volume 2. To benefit M.O.V.E for Autism	54 Below
April 21, 2014	The Lightning Thief Benefit Concert. To benefit Theatreworks USA's Free Summer Theatre Program	Lucille Lortel Theatre
April 5, 2014	Unsung Carolyn Leigh	Lincoln Center's Stanley H. Kaplan Penthouse, NY
March 24, 2014	Past is Present: The Lyrics of Sarah Rebell	Metropolitan Room, NY
January 27, 2014	Contemporary Musical Theatre Songwriters You Should Know LIVE! To benefit The Jonathan Larson Grants Fund at the American Theatre Wing	54 Below, NY
December 15, 2013	2nd Annual Frank & Friends Holiday Concert to benefit The Actors Fund	Birdland NYC
December 9, 2013	"Broadway Loves Shriners" to benefit Shriners Hospitals for Children	Grand Lodge Masonic Hall, NY
December 3, 2013	B-Side Production's "Elegies For Angels, Punks & Raging Queens" Winter Gala to benefit Ali Forney Center	The Studio At Theatre 511, NY
November 4, 2013	"Frank & Friends" at Birdland NYC to benefit The Actors Fund	Birdland NYC
October 26, 2013	Dream Foundation's "12th Annual Celebration of Dreams"	Bacara Resort, CA
October 18, 2013	25th Annual Festival of New Musicals 'Songwriters Showcase'	New World Stages, NY
September 14 & 15, 2013	Sacramento's Best Of Broadway 40th Anniversary Celebration	Veteran's Memorial Amphitheatre, CA
August 22, 2013	Rosie's Theater Kids Junior Gala Kickoff	New York, NY
June 17, 2013	"Frank & Friends" at Birdland NYC to benefit The Actors Fund	Birdland NYC
June 10, 2013	Irish Repertory Theatre's 25th Anniversary Gala "Something Wonderful! The Songs of Rodgers & Hammerstein"	Broadhurst Theatre, NY
June 3, 2013	American Cancer Society's One Centennial Sensation — A Tribute to Marvin Hamlisch	Hudson Theatre, NY
February 18, 2013	"Frank Wildhorn & Friends" at Pantages Theater to benefit The Actors Fund	Pantages Theatre, CA
June 16, 2012	Drew Gasparini at The Kennedy Center Millennium Stage	The Kennedy Center Millennium Stage
May 29, 2012	The World Science Festival's Fifth Anniversary Gala Celebration "Performing Arts Salute to Science"	Lincoln Center for the Performing Arts' Allen Room and Atrium Frederick P. Rose Hall
May 19, 2012	California Musical Theatre's Wicked Gala: Benefit show supporting the Music Circus Foundation	Sacramento Convention Center Ballroom
February 25 & 27, 2012	I Can't Wait: The Songs of Patrick Dwyer	The Duplex Cabaret Theatre, NY
January 22, 2012	Drew Gasparini at Joe's Pub	Joe's Pub
October 3, 2011	Fall Into The Nova - Ars Nova's Benefit To Support Emerging Artists	Ars Nova Theater
August 4, 2011	106.7 Lite fm Presents Broadway in Bryant Park 2011	Bryant Park, NY
June 27, 2011	Prospect Theater Company's benefit "Make Our Garden Grow"	Battery Gardens, Harbor View Room
May 16, 2011	"Neo7" A Concert Celebration Of Emerging Musical Theatre Writers Benefiting The York Theatre Company	York Theatre, NY
March 28, 2011	Drew Gasparini at Joe's Pub	Joe's Pub
February 28, 2011	NewMusicalTheatre.com LIVE	Canal Room
October 2, 2010	UCI "A Celebration of Stars - The 2010 Medal Awards"	Bren Events Center, UC Irvine
February 8, 2010	REAF "All You Need Is Love 2"	Marines Memorial Theatre, San Francisco
January 25, 2010	The Women of Wicked: In Conversation and Song	Museum of Performance & Design
January 8, 2010	Family Violence Prevention Fund	Presidio, San Francisco
December 7, 2009	REAF "One Night Only" Holiday Cabaret	J'LaChic Theatre San Francisco
October 26, 2009	Defying Inequality: The San Francisco Concert	Palace of Fine Arts Theatre, San Francisco
February 22, 2009	29th Annual Academy of Friends Gala A Night of Superheroes, Villains, & Divas	Fort Mason Center, San Francisco
May 19, 2008	Art4Life 2	Avalon Hollywood
September 25, 2008	The House of Blues Sunset Strip presents Lance Horne & The One Night Stands	Foundation Room at the House of Blues
October 15, 2007	"Performers For Peace" a benefit concert in support of: Physicians for Peace and Collaborative Play Productions	Triad in NY
May 30, 2007	Justin Bond (They Long to be) Close To You	The Zipper Factory

== Television ==
Date	Title	Role	Notes
March 13, 2018	NCIS: New Orleans	Michelle Faucheux	Season 4, Episode 17 "Treasure Hunt" (CBS)
April 24, 2014	Elementary	Tess Dahl	Season 2, Episode 21 "The Man With the Twisted Lip" (CBS)
February 19, 2012	The Good Wife	Sara Fellner	Season 3, Episode 15 "Live From Damascus" (CBS)
March 18, 2011	NBC's In The Wings	Herself	Premiere Episode
March 7, 2011	MTV's The Seven	Herself	A Wicked backstage tour with Jay Manuel of America's Next Top Model

== Discography ==
Date	Title	Album	Notes
November 10, 2017	The Ballad Of Little Jo (Original Cast Recording)	The Ballad Of Little Jo (Original Cast Recording)	
June 23, 2015	Finding Neverland - A New Musical Original Broadway Cast Album	Finding Neverland - A New Musical Original Broadway Cast Album	
September 25, 2012	Jekyll & Hyde - 2012 Concept Recording	Jekyll & Hyde - 2012 Concept Recording	
January 2011	You Never Heard My Song	You Never Heard My Song - EP	iTunes
January 2011	Comes And Goes	You Never Heard My Song - EP	iTunes
January 2011	Deeply Blue	You Never Heard My Song - EP	iTunes
January 2011	I Know He's Out There	You Never Heard My Song - EP	iTunes
April 2019	The Cher Show (Original Broadway Cast Recording)	The Cher Show (Original Broadway Cast Recording)	

== Commercial ==
Date	Product	Notes
2014	Cetaphil TV Commercial 'Gentle Power'	
2015	The Jim Gaffigan Show	
