= David Hershel Alpers =

American gastroenterologist

- Born: May 9, 1935 (age 91); Philadelphia, Pennsylvania
- Education: Harvard College; Harvard Medical School
- Spouse: Melanie
- Children: 3
- Awards: Friedenwald Medal
- Scientific career
- Fields: Gastroenterology

David Hershel Alpers is a gastroenterologist, researcher, professor, and former president of the American Gastroenterological Association (1990–1991).

== Early life and education ==
David Hershel Alpers was born 9 May 1935 in Philadelphia, Pennsylvania. He received his M.D. from Harvard Medical School in 1960 and completed training in internal medicine at Massachusetts General Hospital (MGH). He studied molecular biology at the National Institute of Health under Gordon Tomkins (1962–64) before returning to MGH for gastroenterology fellowship (1964–66) and junior faculty positions (1966–69).

== Medical and teaching career ==
Alpers was Chief of the Gastroenterology Division at Washington University School of Medicine from 1969 to 1997 and is currently the William B. Kountz Professor of Medicine and assistant director of the Center for Human Nutrition. Since moving to Washington University as division chief, he has been Professor of Medicine since 1973.

== Research ==
Alpers is recognized for his research in intestinal protein biochemistry. His efforts are also responsible for much of our knowledge of cobalamin (vitamin B12) metabolism and absorption by the gastrointestinal tract.

His longstanding interests in the psychiatric aspects of gastrointestinal disease helped formulate some of the current thinking about brain-gut interactions.

== Associations and awards ==
Alpers served as the president of the American Gastroenterological Association from 1990 and received the Friedenwald Medal from that association, the most prestigious recognition for a career of scientific contribution to the field.

Alpers received a Guggenhem Fellowship in 1981.

Alpers served as editor of the American Journal of Physiology (Gastrointestinal and Liver Physiology).
