= Thomas P. Bernstein =

American political scientist

- Awards: Guggenheim Fellowship (1981)

Academic background
- Education: Columbia University (PhD)

Academic work
- Discipline: Comparative politics
- Institutions: Columbia University

Thomas Paul Bernstein (born April 11, 1937) is an American political scientist and specialist in the Chinese political economy and communist systems. He is an emeritus professor at Columbia University.

== Biography ==
Bernstein earned his Ph.D. from Columbia University and joined the Columbia faculty in 1975. Bernstein has written about the collectivization of agriculture in the Soviet Union and China, state-peasant relations, economic growth during China's reform and opening period, and Sino-Soviet relations. He served as two-time chairman of Columbia's department of political science and retired from teaching in 2007.

Bernstein received a 1981 Guggenheim Fellowship.
