= Joel Myerson =

Joel Myerson (September 9, 1945 - November 19, 2021) was a Distinguished Professor Emeritus of English Language and Literature at the University of South Carolina. He edited many books about the works of such American literary figures as Ralph Waldo Emerson, Henry David Thoreau, Nathaniel Hawthorne, Louisa May Alcott, Emily Dickinson, and Walt Whitman.

He served as President of the Ralph Waldo Emerson Society and the Thoreau Society, and as the founding President of the Louisa May Alcott Society.

== Education ==
- Ph.D., Northwestern University, 1971
