= Donald R. Uhlmann =

American engineering professor (born 1936)

- Born: Donald Robert Uhlmann; 1936 (age 89–90)
- Occupation: Professor

Academic background
- Education: Yale University (BS); Harvard University (PhD)

Donald Robert Uhlmann (born 1936) is Professor of Materials Science and Engineering and Professor of Optical Science at the University of Arizona in Tucson, Arizona.

Uhlmann holds a BS degree in physics from Yale University and a Ph.D. in applied physics from Harvard University. He was a professor at the Massachusetts Institute of Technology for more than two decades, eventually holding its Cabot Professorship of Materials, before moving to the University of Arizona

He is a Fellow of the American Ceramic Society, and of the U.K. Society of Glass Technology. He has been elected a member of the Academy of Ceramics. He was also elected as a member into the U.S. National Academy of Engineering in 1996 for achievements in glass technology and in optical and structural applications of glass. He is a Trustee of the Ernst Abbe Foundation and on the advisory board of the Institute fur Neue Materialien, both located in Germany, and is a director of Magna Mirrors of America, Inc.

He has published over 400 technical papers, and is the author or editor of over 10 books.
