= Allen Guttmann =

American sport historian and journalist

Allen Guttmann (born October 13, 1932, in Chicago, Illinois) is a former Amherst College professor who wrote From Ritual to Record: The Nature of Modern Sports (1978).

According to the Journal of Sport History, "Erudite, witty, and a polymath fluent in several languages, Allen Guttmann is sui generis, a sport history and intellectual giant. Professor Emeritus of English and American studies at Amherst College, one of the most prestigious liberal arts colleges in the country, Guttmann has been studying and writing about sport history for forty-plus years. His eleven sport history books and innumerable articles cover a wide array of subjects and have been critically acclaimed (and sometimes hotly critiqued, which comes with the territory)."

Guttmann graduated from the University of Florida (B.A. 1953), Columbia University (M.A. 1956), and the University of Minnesota (PhD. 1961).

Guttmann has written eleven books on sport. In 2001 he was awarded the IOC Research Prize. He was president of the North American Society for Sport History from 2001 to 2003. In October 2009, he was honored by the International Society of Olympic Historians (ISOH) for his work as a whole.

Guttmann references fields of knowledge from history to philosophy, from sociology to anthropology and from literature to psychology, His work has led to debates. Thierry Terret writes in his foreword to the French translation of From Ritual to Record (2006): "To admit, these debates have hardly been followed in France where, in the 1980s, the history of sport developed relatively on the margins of the international community." Jean-François Loudcher wrote of the book that it "has marked, and still marks, a whole generation of historians of sport to the point of being the subject of a number of criticisms and debates. (...) the persistence of the author in maintaining his theory raises questions about his scientific status and the need that the field of social sciences of sport feels to refer to this approach".

In Sports: The First Millennia, Guttmann remains ironic, confessing, "No one knows enough to write such" a book.

== Bibliography ==
- From Ritual to Record: the Nature of Modern Sports, Columbia University Press, 1978 (ed. rev. in 2004, translated into French in 2006).
- The Games Must Go On: Avery Brundage and the Olympic Movement, Columbia University Press, 1984.
- Sports Spectators, Columbia University Press, 1986.
- A Whole New Ball Game: An Interpretation of American Sports, University of North Carolina Press, 1988.
- Women's Sports: a history, Columbia University Press, 1991.
- The Olympics: A History of the Modern Games, University of Illinois Press, 1992 (ed. rev. in 2001).
- Games and Empires: Modern Sports and Cultural Imperialism, Columbia University Press, 1994.
- The Erotic in Sports, Columbia University Press, 1996.
- with Karen Christensen and Gertrud Pfister, Encyclopedia of Women and Sports, MacMillan Reference, 2000.
- with Lee Thompson, Japanese sports: a history, University of Hawaii Press, 2001.
- Sports: The First Five Millennia, University of Massachusetts Press, 2004.
- Sports and American Art, University of Massachusetts Press, 2011.
