= Jon Pritikin =

American motivational speaker (born 1973)

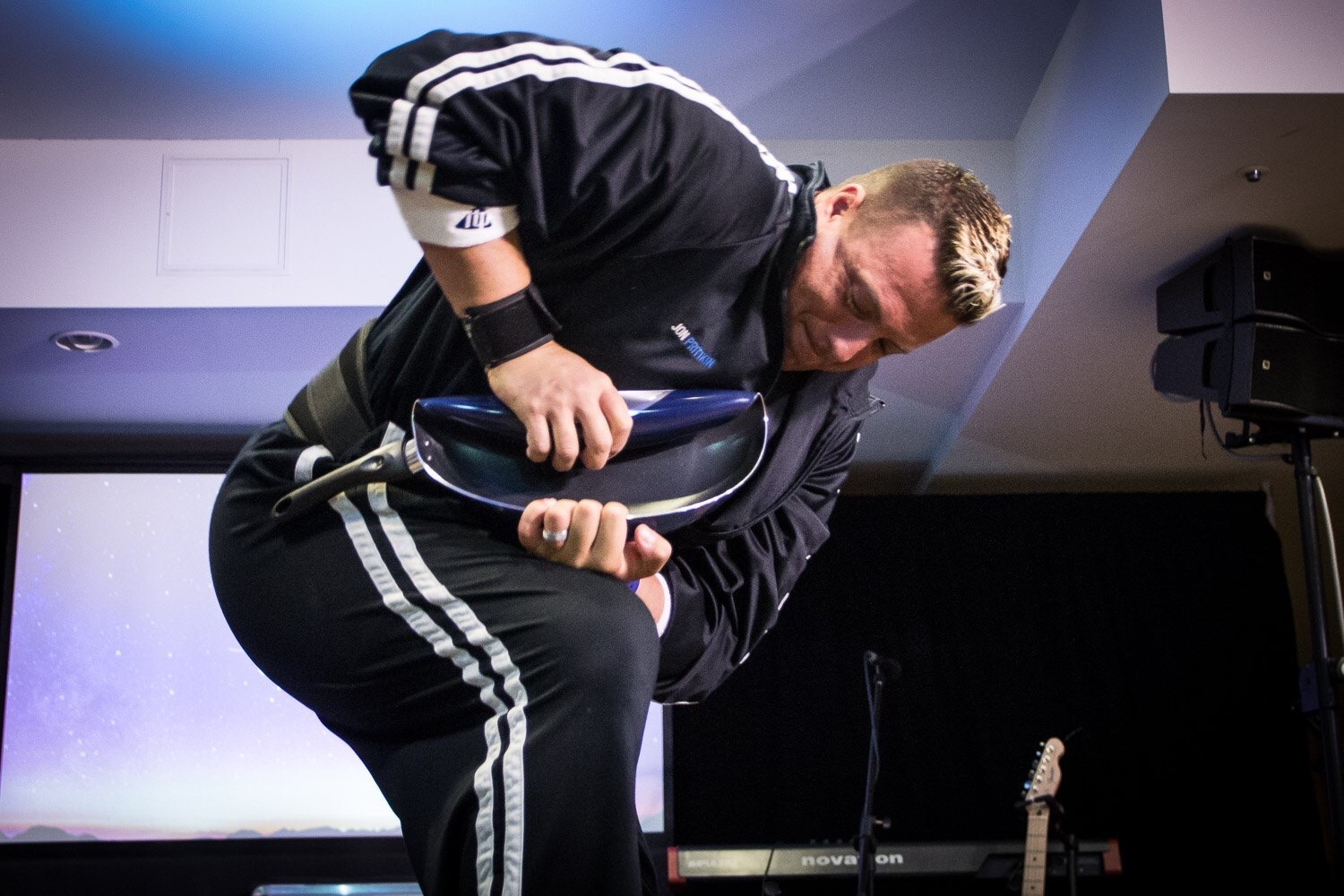
- A photo of Jon Pritikin rolling a frying pan in Osaka, Japan.
- Born: Jonathan Andrew Pritikin; February 26, 1973 (age 53); Rockford, Illinois, United States
- Other name: "JP"
- Occupation: Motivational Speaker
- Years active: 1994–present
- Known for: 2x Guinness World Record holder
- Height: 6 ft 4 in (1.9m)
- Spouse: Rhonda (m. 1995)
- Children: 1
- Website: www.jonpritikin.com

Jon Pritikin (born February 26, 1973) is an American strongman and motivational speaker.

== Early life and education ==
Pritikin was born in Rockford, Illinois to a Jewish family, Andrew and Nancy (née Kunz) Pritikin.

Pritikin had speech and learning disabilities as a child. Placed in special education in first grade, he was bullied and abused by schoolmates and neighborhood children, and has said he had no friends.

In high school, a teacher worked with him on his speech impediment and academic problems, and he was accepted on academic probation to Bethany University in Scotts Valley, California.

== Career ==
In 1994, Pritikin co-founded a nonprofit organization, Feel The Power, which produces an anti-bullying assembly for elementary, middle, and high school students. The assembly consists of motivational speaking and a presentation of Pritikin's physical strength through various strongman exercises. His message focuses on the long term effects of bullying and the importance of accepting others. In 2008, Pritikin became involved in an anti-steroid program known as S.W.A.T.S., which is an acronym for Sports With Alternatives to Steroids. As of 2021, Pritikin has spoken to more than 10 million students in 60 nations. In October 2021, Pritikin released his first book titled Feel The Power: A Survivor's Guide to Happiness.

=== World records ===
Pritikin broke and set two Guinness World Records for "the tightest circumference of two aluminum frying pans rolled together with his bare hands in less than 30 seconds.” The frying pans were 30 cm (12 in) and he broke the record at Rectory Road Park in Sittingbourne, Kent, UK on July 11, 2007.

== Personal life ==
Pritikin met his wife Rhonda (née Garcia) when they were both students at Bethany University; they married in 1995. They live in California and have one child.
