= William A. Maguire =

Irish historian (born 1959)

- Born: 1959 (age 66–67)
- Occupation: Historian

William A. Maguire (born 1959) is an Irish historian.

== Selected publications ==
- A Century in Focus: Photography and Photographers in the North of Ireland
- Belfast: A History (Carnegie publishing)
- Kings in Conflict: The Revolutionary War in Ireland and Its Aftermath, 1689-1750
- Up in Arms! 1798 Rebellion in Ireland - Record of a Bicentenary Exhibition in the Ulster Museum
- Living Like A Lord: The Second Marquis Of Donegall 1769-1844
- Georgian Belfast, 1750-1850: Maps, Buildings and Trades
