= Devon W. Meek =

American chemist (1936–1988)

Devon Walter Meek (1936–1988) was an American chemist and professor at Ohio State University.

== Background and career ==
Meek was born in Kentucky, and received his BS in chemistry from Berea College. His MS and Ph.D. were received at the University of Illinois at Urbana–Champaign, where he studied sulfoxide complexes of transition metals under Professor Russell S. Drago. He served for 27 years in the chemistry department of OSU, rising eventually to department chair. Meek's research group studied synthetic inorganic complexes - especially those of the Rare-earth elements and late metals - and spectroscopy.

Meek's papers are held in a special collection of the OSU library.

=== Books authored ===
With William Thomas Lipponcott and Frank H. Verhoek, Meek authored an undergraduate text in 1970, Experimental General Chemistry.

== Awards and honors ==
- 1981 - Guggenheim Fellowship

The Meek Lecture, given annually at OSU since 1989, has honored distinguished chemists including Dennis C. Liotta, Jay Keasling, Ralph F. Hirschmann, Alfred Bader, Allison A. Campbell, Edward J. J. Grabowski, and William Nugent.
