= Educating the Disfranchised and Disinherited =

Biography of American General Samuel Chapman Armstrong

- Author: Robert Francis Engs
- Language: English
- Subject: Armstrong, S. C., Hampton Institute
- Published: 1999 (University of Tennessee Press)
- Publication place: United States
- Pages: 232
- ISBN: 978-1-57233-051-1
- Dewey Decimal: 378.1
- LC Class: LC2851.H313A764

Educating the Disfranchised and Disinherited is a 1999 biography of American General Samuel Chapman Armstrong and his associated normal school for freedmen, Hampton Institute, written by Robert Francis Engs and published by the University of Tennessee Press. The first full biography of its kind, the book portrays Armstrong as a complex politician and administrator in the postbellum period who balanced the needs of opposed parties surrounding the Virginia school: its African American students, Southern white neighbors, and Northern philanthropist funders. Previous works presented Armstrong in a polarized fashion, as either a savior or handicap for freedmen. The book emphasizes Armstrong's upbringing as a missionary in Hawaii in the development of his educational philosophy.

Reviewers complimented the book's balanced presentation of Armstrong, grounded use of the period's thought, and contribution to the historiography of industrial education. They felt the book lacked community and state historical context, as well as recent scholarship on Native Americans at Hampton.

== Summary ==
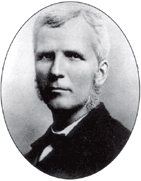
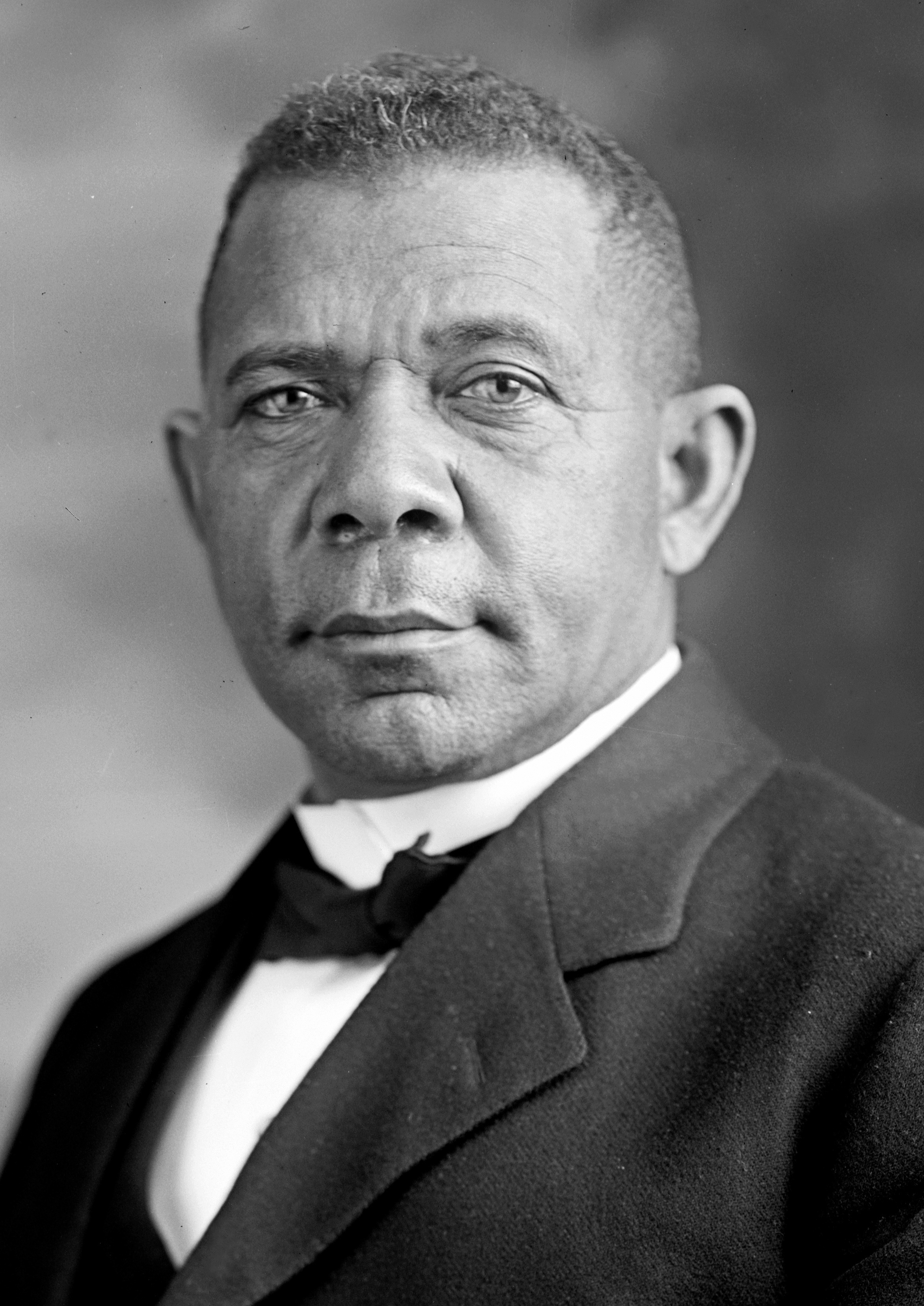
Armstrong and his protégé, Booker T. Washington

Robert Francis Engs's Educating the Disfranchised and Disinherited: Samuel Chapman Armstrong and Hampton Institute, 1839–1893 is the first biography of General Samuel Chapman Armstrong, the founder of the Hampton Normal and Agricultural Institute. The book was published by the University of Tennessee Press in 1999. It challenges several long-standing ideas about this period: that the "Hampton-Tuskegee system" and its adherents stunted the progress of African Americans, that the Hampton Institute ideology was opposed to that of historically black and historically white colleges, and that the positions of W. E. B. DuBois and Booker T. Washington were diametrically opposed. Engs writes Armstrong as a symbol of postbellum America's conflicts over race, class, religion, and gender. Engs's Armstrong, in "paternal ... arrogance" believed that he and others of higher status could best determine how to improve the lots of those suppressed by "lack of opportunity and discrimination", such as African Americans and American Indians. This intuition, of knowing "what was best for the freedmen", was influenced by his experience in missionary work, where his parents treated the indigenous Hawaiians as misbehaving children with behavior to be corrected. The biography distills Armstrong's philosophy, demeanor, and understanding of African Americans from his experiences as a missionary, student of Williams College, and leader in the American Civil War. Engs dismisses polarized interpretations of Armstrong's legacy as either a savior or a handicap for uneducated blacks. Instead, Armstrong is portrayed as a complex man who believes both in "black inferiority" and that freedmen could improve their lives through his lessons.

Armstrong was born and raised in Hawaii in the mid-1800s. His father was the Kingdom of Hawaii's (secular) minister of public instruction, whose schools practiced the "manual labor principle of education". Engs wrote that Armstrong's Hawaiian childhood insulated him from racist sentiment on the mainland. Armstrong attended private schools in Oahu before moving to study on the mainland. He shied away from the ministry, believing as his father, "the shorter one's creed, the better". Armstrong's experience in the Civil War—including as a prisoner of war, leader of the United States Colored Troops, and General—led to his lifelong pursuit of "noble strife" in helping his "fellow man". He joined the Freedmen's Bureau and served as the first principal of the Hampton Institute on the Virginia Peninsula. Hampton's task was to prepare African Americans "to teach their people the 'civilizing' ways of white men" through "Christian teachings, a strict code of conduct, and manual labor". Hampton was one of eight American Missionary Association teacher-training schools. Armstrong left a 25-year legacy, and introduced the school's manual and industrial teaching methods in the late 1860s despite its increased cost. Engs distinguishes this vision from the post-1900 industrial education, with Armstrong's "industry" signifying the industriousness of "self-discipline and self-reliance". The labor proceeds also supported the black students through school, though only during school months. Armstrong sought to see his "best" graduates ascend to higher education and to occupations "originally envisioned for whites". As his "most famous student", "virtual son", and "spiritual heir", Booker T. Washington opened the Tuskegee Institute in the style of Hampton. Armstrong later expanded Hampton's scope to include Native Americans, who were kept apart from the blacks as a "school within a school".

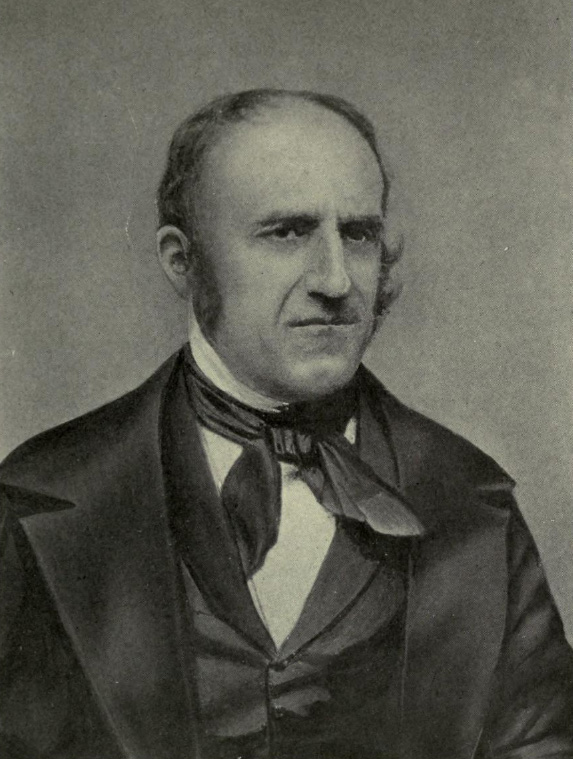
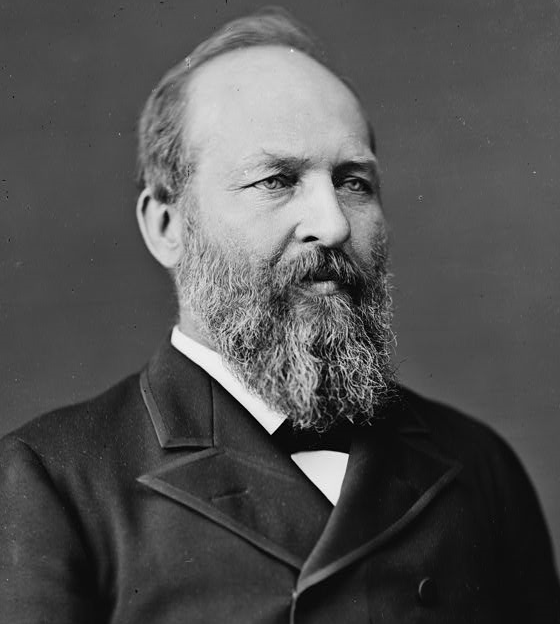
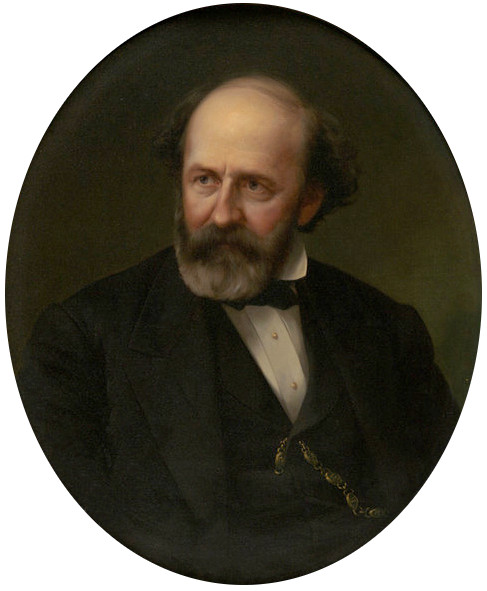
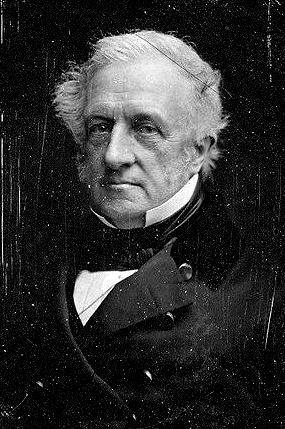
- Hopkins Garfield Huntington Peabody Clockwise from top left: Mark Hopkins and James Garfield assisted Armstrong in the school's design. Philanthropists George Peabody and Collis Huntington advised Armstrong.

Engs notes that missionaries struggled to reconcile the task of assimilating discriminated peoples into a society that defined itself by that active discrimination. Engs portrays Armstrong as a natural politician, administrator, and "risk-taker" who sought broad-based support from opposed parties, including African Americans, the "anti-Negro white South", and white philanthropists of the North, which made Armstrong into a "master prevaricator". As a "realist", Armstrong adopted the subtleties of his patrons to keep Hampton open, and did not confuse "the uplift of African Americans" with "promoting their equality with whites". Hampton's curriculum was ultimately set by federal and donor money. In time, Armstrong's goals for the school were derailed by increased costs and the school's Northern industrialist backers, who made manual labor education the focus and end of the curriculum, rather than a means. Engs concludes that Armstrong's black graduates lived in better circumstances than their peers. Many became teachers in the South and were "grateful" for their opportunities. Reversely, Hampton's Native American graduates suffered in health at the school and had little job opportunity back out West. Engs also concluded that Armstrong's work was limited by his reliance on the elite, emphasis on white men deciding black lives, and inability to change his philosophy when his assumptions became outdated. Still, Engs thought that Armstrong succeeded in his intent to "civilize" students at Hampton, though this mattered little, Engs wrote, when white society was unprepared to accept them "no matter how civilized they might be".

== Reception ==
Wilbert Ahern (Journal of American History) found the book's arguments convincing and "gracefully written", but wanted to know more about Armstrong's background in financial administration, forming of ties with the Northern philanthropists, and successful students apart from Booker T. Washington. Jennings Wagoner (History of Education Quarterly) noted that Armstrong's intentions were portrayed as comparable to the leaders of George Fredrickson's Inner Civil War, who saw their work as an extension of that of the Founding Fathers. Wagoner wrote that Engs provided a "well-grounded" biography that handles Armstrong's "complexities and contradictions" with skillful use of the historiography and understanding of the era. Ahern emphasized the biography's "balance" in contrast to prior partisan writing on Armstrong. He noted Donald Spivey's Schooling for the New Slavery and Engs's first book, the 1979 Freedmen's First Generation, as examples of work that associates Armstrong with "stifling ... African-American aspirations". Ahern also wrote that Engs's work affirms the then-controversial claim in James McPherson's 1975 The Abolitionist Legacy that Armstrong was "fundamentally dedicated to the advancement of opportunity for African Americans" and other races. Edna Greene Medford (The North Carolina Historical Review) wrote that the book was particularly valuable to the historiography of industrial education.

Medford praised Engs's contextualization of the late-nineteenth century in American political, racial, and educational thought, but criticized his treatment of the relationship between the school and its community, particularly in stories of its students interacting with the community. Ahern felt that Engs missed relevant, recent literature on Armstrong's impact on Native Americans. Harold Forsythe (The Journal of Southern History) described Engs's tone as mild, but with a "continuous ... critical bite". Forsythe also marked the book's reliance on Armstrong's and Hampton records and consequent distance from the larger history of Virginia.
