= Wendy Salinger =

American poet (born 1947)

- Born: February 3, 1947 (age 79); Kansas City, Kansas, U.S.
- Education: Duke University (BA); University of Iowa (MFA)
- Occupations: Poet; memoirist
- Employer: College of Charleston
- Awards: Guggenheim Fellow (1981)

Wendy Lang Salinger (born February 3, 1947) is an American poet and memoirist. A 1981 Guggenheim Fellow, she wrote the 1980 poetry collection Folly River and the 2006 memoir Listen.

== Biography ==
Wendy Lang Salinger was born on February 3, 1947, in Kansas City, Kansas, and moved eastward to Durham, North Carolina when she was a young child. She was the daughter of Herman Salinger, who was chair of the Duke University departments of German and comparative literature, and Marion Casting Salinger, who was a researcher on American and Canadian forestry resources and a program administrator at Duke. She attended Charles E. Jordan High School, where she served as yearbook copy-editor and wrote articles for The Herald-Sun. She then obtained her BA in English in 1969 from Duke University, where her poems were published for the first time in a literary magazine and where she was part of Phi Beta Kappa. In 1971, she obtained her MFA in Creative Writing from the University of Iowa.

In the 1970s, she moved to Folly Beach, South Carolina, and she became a visiting and assistant professor of English at the College of Charleston, as well as a researcher, writer, and visiting artist at the South Carolina Arts Commission. She was also a resident poet at the Virginia Commission for the Arts and Humanities. She won the 1980 National Poetry Series Open Competition for her poetry collection Folly River, published as part of the National Poetry Series in 1980 and inspired by her time in Folly Beach. In 1981, she was awarded a Guggenheim Fellowship in Poetry. She was a MacDowell Colony Fellow in 1982, 1983, and 1985. She also did poetry readings in University of South Carolina Beaufort and the Surfside Beach Branch Library.

In 1983, Richard Wilbur's Creation, an essay collection she edited, was published by University of Michigan Press. In 1988, she was a participant and workshop director at the first Carolina Connections in Charleston, South Carolina. She organized writing workshops for New York City Department of Education high school students as the decades-long director of the Schools Project at 92nd Street Y Unterberg Poetry Center.

She got her fourth MacDowell fellowship in 2003, where she worked on the novel Victor Dying, before it became the memoir Listen, published in 2006.

== Works ==
- Folly River (1980)
- Listen (2006)
