= Kristan von Waldenfels =

German politician (born 2000)

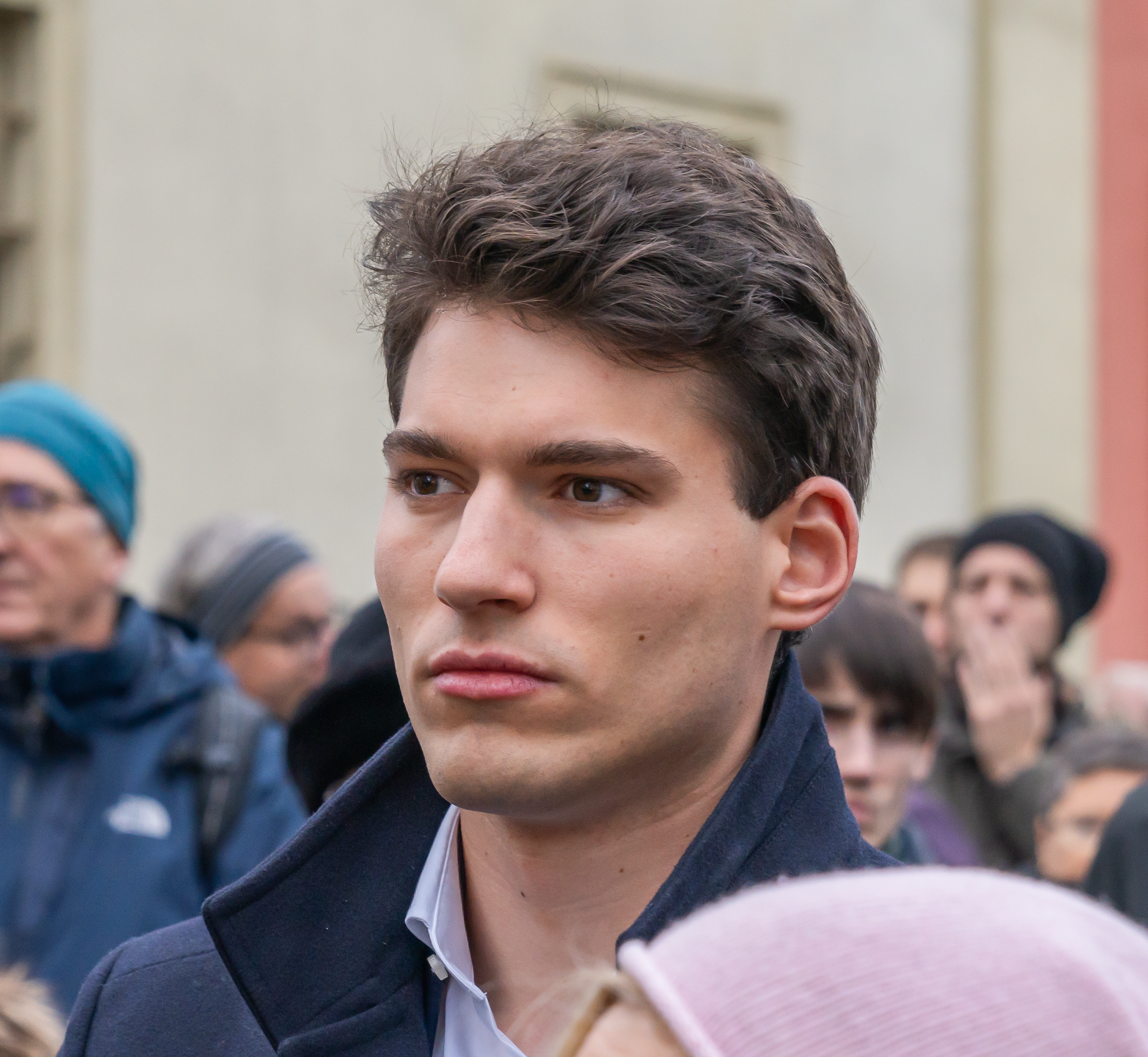
- von Waldenfels in 2023

Member of the Landtag of Bavaria
- Incumbent
- Assumed office 30 October 2023
- Preceded by: Alexander König
- Constituency: Hof

Personal details
- Born: 26 April 2000 (age 26)
- Party: Christian Social Union in Bavaria
- Parent: Rudolf von Waldenfels (father)

Kristan Wilhelm Bodo Georg Freiherr von Waldenfels (born 26 April 2000) is a German politician. He has been a member of the Landtag of Bavaria since 2023, and has served as mayor of Lichtenberg since 2020. He is the son of Rudolf von Waldenfels.
