= Paul McDonough (photographer) =

American photographer (1941–2025)

- Born: Paul Andrew McDonough; February 18, 1941; Portsmouth, New Hampshire, U.S.
- Died: March 25, 2025 (aged 84); New York City, U.S.
- Education: Suffolk University
- Occupation: Photographer
- Known for: Street photography
- Spouses: Judy Greenwood (divorced); Yona Zeldis
- Children: 1

Paul Andrew McDonough (February 18, 1941 – March 25, 2025) was an American street photographer, who lived in New York City. His work is held in the collection of the Museum of Modern Art in New York and in 1981 he was awarded a Guggenheim Fellowship.

== Early life and education ==
Paul Andrew McDonough was born in Portsmouth, New Hampshire, on February 18, 1941. He was educated at Suffolk University's New England School of Art.

== Life and work ==
His initial interest was in painting, but he soon embraced photography after graduating in 1964. He spent early years in Vermont and Massachusetts before moving to New York later in the decade. He began gaining attention for his street photography in the 1970s.

McDonough taught at numerous art schools, including Marymount Manhattan College, the Pratt Institute, the Parsons School of Design, the School of Visual Arts, and Yale University. He published several books of his photography, with the last being Headed West in 2021.

He died from Alzheimer's disease at a care facility in Brooklyn, on March 25, 2025, at the age of 84.

== Personal life ==
McDonough was married to Judy Greenwood, though they later divorced. He then married Yona Zeldis, with whom he had a son.

== Publications ==
- New York Photographs 1968–1978. New York: Umbrage, 2010. ISBN 978-1884167997. With an essay by Susan Kismaric and a transcript of an interview with McDonough by Albert Mobilio.
- Sight Seeing. New York: Sasha Wolf; Purple Martin, 2014. With an introduction by Wolf.
- Headed West. West Midlands, UK: Stanley/Barker, 2021. ISBN 978-1-913288-23-5.

== Awards ==
- 1981: Guggenheim Fellowship from the John Simon Guggenheim Memorial Foundation

== Collections ==
McDonough's work is held in the following permanent collection:

- Museum of Modern Art, New York: 6 prints (as of July 2021)
