= Nathan Pritikin =

American nutritionist and inventor (1915–1985)

- Born: August 28, 1915; Chicago, Illinois
- Died: February 21, 1985 (aged 69); Albany, New York
- Spouse: Ilene (1923–2009)
- Children: 4 sons, 1 daughter
- Writing career
- Genre: Nutrition

Nathan Pritikin (August 29, 1915 – February 21, 1985) was an American inventor, engineer, nutritionist and longevity researcher. He promoted the Pritikin diet, a high-carbohydrate low-fat plant-based diet combined with regular aerobic exercise to prevent cardiovascular disease. The Pritikin diet emphasizes the consumption of legumes, whole grains, fresh fruit and vegetables, and non-fat dairy products with small amounts of lean meat, fowl, and fish.

== Biography ==
The eldest son born to Jacob and Ester, Pritikin was born and raised in Chicago, Illinois. He was given a scholarship to the University of Chicago and attended from 1933 to 1935, dropping out because of the Depression and starting his own business Flash Foto. He became an inventor and a millionaire developing patents for companies such as Honeywell, General Electric, and Bendix while living in Chicago. He later moved the company to Santa Barbara, California in the 1950s. Pritikin retired in 1966 and devoted his attention to longevity and nutritional research. He established the Pritikin Longevity Center in Santa Barbara in 1976, which later moved to Santa Monica. The facility closed in 1997 and became the Hotel Casa del Mar. The Pritikin Longevity Center then relocated to Miami. His son Robert was the head of Pritikin Research Foundation.

== Pritikin Diet ==
In 1958, Pritikin was diagnosed with "coronary artery insufficiency (without symptoms) secondary to an exercise electrocardiogram". By diet and exercise, he was able to reduce his cholesterol level.

His dietary and exercise regime is called the Pritikin Diet or Pritikin Program. He charged patients $6,000 for several weeks of the Program at his Pritikin center.

The Pritikin diet is low in cholesterol and sodium, and comprises 5–10% fat, 10–15% protein, and 80% carbohydrate. Protein consumption is limited to 3.5 ounces of lean meat daily, which reduces total cholesterol and fat intake. The Pritikin diet has been described as a low-fat, high-fiber plant-based diet. On the Pritikin diet, there are several food categories: the "go" foods, the "caution" foods, and the "stop" foods. The "go" foods encouraged are fruits, vegetables, legumes, whole grains, non-fat dairy products, fish, and lean protein such as white skinless poultry, and tofu. The caution foods include refined grains, refined sweeteners, and salt. The foods to be totally avoided are those rich in saturated fat, organ meats, processed meats, eggs yolks, and vegetable oils.

Pritikin promoted his diet to prevent and treat atherosclerosis, diabetes, gout, high-blood pressure, and other diseases. The Pritikin Program has been authorized as a cardiac rehabilitation program by Medicare.

=== Reception ===
Dietitians and nutritionists have classified the Pritikin diet as a fad diet due to its restrictive nature and unsubstantiated health claims.

Some of Pritikin's dietary recommendations are in line with mainstream nutritional advice, such as emphasizing vegetable consumption and restricting alcohol, but his claims about his Program reversing atherosclerosis are not supported by clinical evidence. He was criticized also for making "false statements", such as "almost any amount of sugar is too much".

The American Medical Association have questioned the effectiveness of the diet for the diseases it is supposed to prevent and have warned that the lower calcium and iron intake may make it unsuitable for pregnant women. In 1985, Columbia University's Institute of Human Nutrition suggested that the Pritikin Program may provide inadequate sources of calcium, copper, and zinc.

Frederick J. Stare commented that the Pritikin diet is an "extremely restrictive plan" that is difficult to adhere to long-term and suggested that the diet may increase the risk of iron deficiency. He suggested that the diet recommended by the American Medical Association is nutritionally balanced and more practical than the Pritikin diet. Alice H. Lichtenstein has suggested that the diet may be time-consuming to plan and prepare meals, and that there is a risk of fat-soluble vitamin deficiencies as the diet is extremely low in fat.

A 2023 review found that the Pritikin diet had no significant impact on all-cause mortality or cardiovascular outcomes.

== Death ==
Pritikin was diagnosed with leukemia in 1958, and it had been in remission until early 1980s when he began to suffer severe pain and complications from the disease and associated treatments. Despite this, he was fully active until a few weeks before his death. He died by suicide at Albany Medical Center on February 21, 1985. Per a letter to the editor, at autopsy it is claimed that there was a near absence of atherosclerosis (only some fatty streaks), and that the heart's pumping function was completely uncompromised.

== Selected publications ==
Articles

- Pritikin, Nathan. (1976). High Carbohydrate Diets: Maligned and Misunderstood. The Journal of Applied Nutrition 28 (3&4): 56-68.

Books

- Live Longer Now: The First One Hundred Years of Your Life: The 2100 Program. Grosset & Dunlap. ISBN 0-448-11504-2 co-authored with Jon N. Leonard and Jack L. Hofer (1974).
- The Pritikin Program for Diet and Exercise. Bantam. ISBN 978-0553271928 co-authored with Patrick M. McGrady (1979).
- The Pritikin Permanent Weight Loss Manual. Bantam. ISBN 0553204947 (1981).
- The Pritikin Promise: 28 Days to a Longer, Healthier Life. Simon & Schuster. ISBN 978-0671494476 (1983).
- Diet for Runners: The High-Performance Diet that Gives You Supercharged Energy and Endurance ISBN 978-0671556235 (1985).
- Pritikin: The Man Who Healed America's Heart ISBN 0-87857-732-7 Tom Monte, Ilene Pritikin (1987).
