= Ilene Berns =

American record company director

Ilene Berns (née Holub; May 1, 1943 – February 20, 2017) was an American record company director.

Born to a Jewish family in Cleveland, Ohio, Berns worked as a go-go dancer in New York City nightclubs before meeting her husband Bert Berns, the songwriter and record producer and founder of Bang Records. They had three children.

Bert died of heart failure on December 30, 1967, leaving Ilene as a 24-year-old widow. She subsequently re-released material from such Bang Records artists as Van Morrison and Neil Diamond, and discovered Mississippi singer-songwriter Paul Davis. She relocated Bang Records to Atlanta, Georgia in 1970 and presided over a decade of success with Davis ("Ride 'Em Cowboy", "I Go Crazy", "Sweet Life"); she also signed and developed Atlanta-based R&B funk group Brick ("Dazz") and singer-songwriter Peabo Bryson.

Berns sold Bang Records to Columbia Records in 1979. She died in Miami, Florida, in February 2017, aged 73.
