= William Kristan =

American biologist

- Born: William B. Kristan, Jr.
- Scientific career
- Fields: Biology
- Institutions: University of California, San Diego

William B. Kristan, Jr. is an American biologist, currently a Distinguished Professor Emeritus at the University of California, San Diego.

He was awarded a Ph.D. by the University of Pennsylvania before becoming a postdoctoral fellow at Stanford University. He was awarded a 1981 Guggenheim Fellowship and was a Fellow of Bielefeld University, Germany.

His interests are in the behaviour of neuronal networks and their creation during embryogenesis. using a variety of advanced techniques to examine the circuits in the relatively controllable nervous system of the medicinal leech.
