= List of United States post offices in Hawaii =

United States post offices operate under the authority of the United States Post Office Department (1792–1971) or the United States Postal Service (since 1971). Historically, post offices were usually placed in a prominent location. Many were architecturally distinctive, including notable buildings featuring Beaux-Arts, Art Deco, and Vernacular architecture. However, modern U.S. post offices were generally designed for functionality rather than architectural style.

Following is a list of United States post offices in Hawaii. Notable post offices include individual buildings, whether still in service or not, which have architectural, historical, or community-related significance. Many of these are listed on the National Register of Historic Places (NRHP) or state and local historic registers.

Post office	City	Date built	Image	Architect	Notes	Ref.
Federal Building, United States Post Office and Courthouse (Hilo, Hawaii)	Hilo	1917		Henry D. Whitfield, Louis A. Simon	(Note: Listed on the National Register of Historic Places)	
Kamehameha V Post Office	Honolulu	1871		J. G. Osborne	(Note: Listed as a National Historic Civil Engineering Landmark)	
King David Kalakaua Building	Honolulu	1921–1922		York and Sawyer		
United States Post Office (Kalaupapa, Hawaii)	Kalaupapa	1934				
United States Post Office (Lihue, Hawaii)	Līhuʻe	1939		Louis A. Simon, Neal A. Melick	(Note: Originally housed two New Deal wooden reliefs by Marguerite Blasingame, later moved to the Līhuʻe Carrier Annex.)	
United States Post Office (Schofield Barracks, Hawaii)	Schofield Barracks	1939–1940		Louis A. Simon, Neal A. Melick	(Note: Houses the New Deal artwork Primitive Communication, a wood carving by Roy King.)	
