= Kalaupapa National Historical Park =

US National Historical Park in Hawaii

- Kalaupapa Leprosy Settlement and National Historical Park
- U.S. National Register of Historic Places
- U.S. National Historic Landmark District
- U.S. National Historical Park
- Hawaiʻi Register of Historic Places
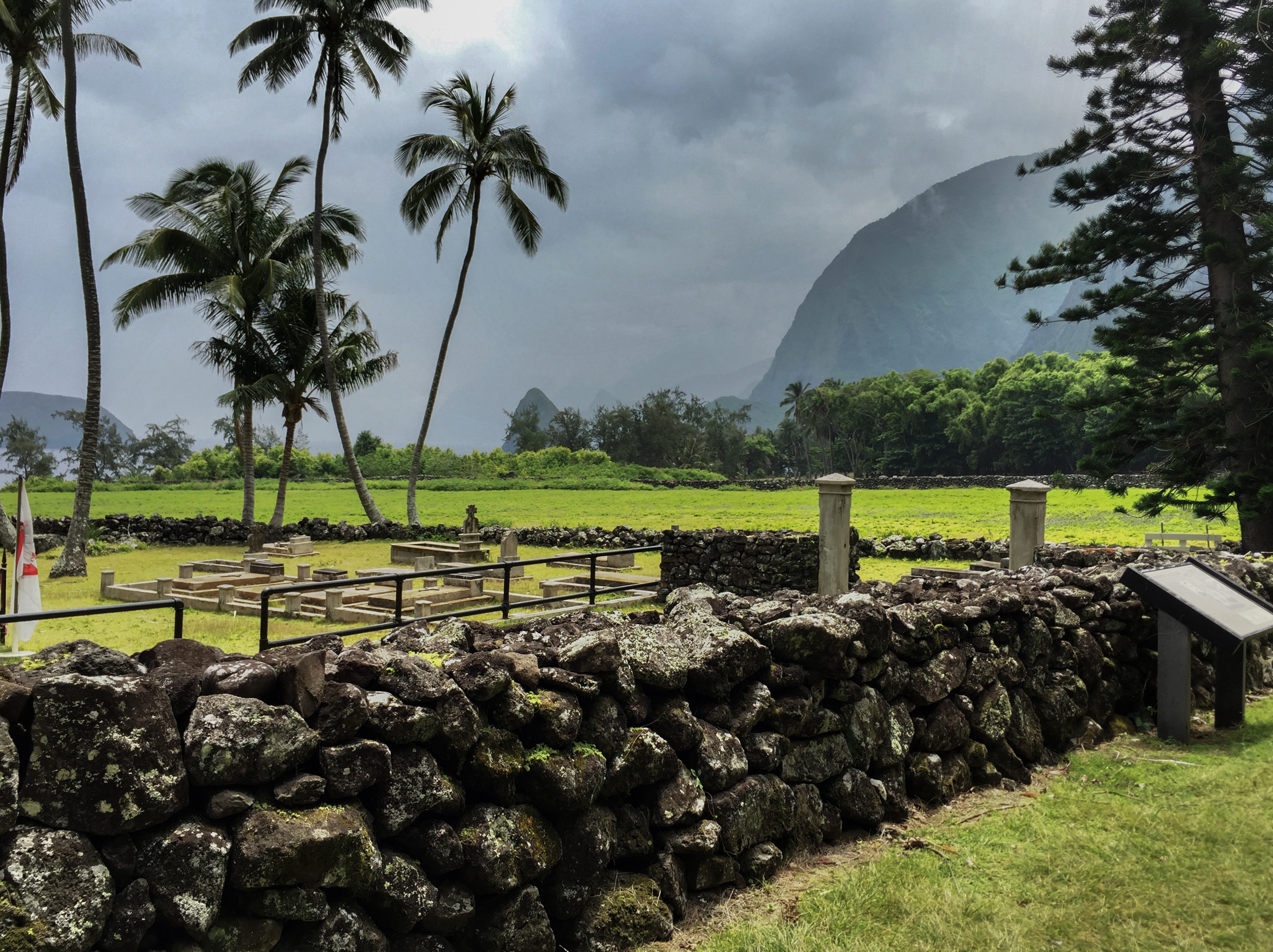
- Kalaupapa National Historical Park in 2015

- Location within Hawaii
- Location: Kalaupapa, Molokaʻi, Hawaiʻi, US
- Coordinates: 21°10′40″N 156°57′36″W
- Area: 10,779 acres (4,362 ha)
- Built: 1866
- Architects: Board of Health, Hawaii
- Visitation: 30,774 (2024)
- Website: Kalaupapa National Historical Park
- NRHP reference No.: 76002145
- HRHP No.: 50-60-03-01024

Significant dates
- Added to NRHP: January 7, 1976
- Designated NHLD: January 7, 1976
- Designated NHP: December 22, 1980
- Designated HRHP: January 7, 1976

Kalaupapa National Historical Park is a United States National Historical Park located in Kalaupapa, Hawaiʻi, on the island of Molokaʻi. Nearly coterminous with the boundaries of Kalawao County, and primarily on Kalaupapa peninsula, it was established by Congress in 1980 to expand upon the earlier National Historic Landmark site of the Kalaupapa Leper Settlement. It is administered by the National Park Service. Its goal is to preserve the cultural and physical settings of the two leper colonies on the island of Molokaʻi, which operated from 1866 to 1969 and had a total of 8500 residents over the decades.

The only way for the general public to visit the settlement is by booking a guided tour. Tours were suspended in March 2020 due to the COVID-19 pandemic, but resumed in September 2025 after the selection of a new tour operator. Tours included a round-trip flight from Honolulu. The Kalaupapa Trail also provides access to the settlement; it was closed in 2018 due to trailhead access issues and reopened in July 2026. The Peninsula Overlook, situated high above the settlement within Palaʻau State Park, is currently the only other publicly accessible part of the park

More than 7300 people live on the remainder of the island, which was a site of cattle ranching and pineapple production for decades. Much of these lands were purchased and controlled by the owners and developers of Molokai Ranch. This part of the island is also a tourist destination.

== History of Kalaupapa peninsula ==
Archeological evidence has revealed human habitation by indigenous peoples for more than 900 years before European contact. The peninsula has house sites, cultivated taro fields and irrigation systems, stone walls, and temples (heiau), all constructed by ancient residents. "Historical accounts from the early to mid-1800s speak of populations of 1,000 to 2,700 people living on the peninsula, in the valleys, and in the villages" but by 1853, there were only about 140 people remaining after epidemics of Eurasian diseases.

=== History of the Kalaupapa leprosy settlements (1865 – present) ===
In 1865 the Kingdom legislature passed a law to try to prevent transmission of leprosy, now known as Hansen's disease after the scientist who discovered the bacterium. The disease had been introduced to the islands about 1830 by foreign workers. At the time it was incurable. Sugar planters had brought pressure on the government as they were worried about the labor supply.

The government arranged for Native Hawaiian inhabitants to be removed from the Kalaupapa to prepare for its development as an isolation settlement for persons with severe leprosy. This cut off the island people's cultural ties and associations with the ʻāina (land), which had been established for centuries.

Bringing patients to the isolation settlements, first at Kalawao and then at Kalaupapa, led to broader dislocations across Hawaiian society. In the long term many families were affected and some divided when a member contracted leprosy. The governments of the Kingdom, and subsequently, the Territory and State of Hawaiʻi tried to control leprosy (also known as Hansen's disease), a much feared illness, by relocating patients with severe symptoms to the isolated peninsula. Other patients were treated in quarantine at facilities on the main islands; but families were still broken up in the process.

The first settlement was started on the windward side at Kalawao, followed by one at Kalaupapa. In 1890 a total of 1100 persons with leprosy were living here, the peak of resident population. In those years, they generally had to leave family behind on other islands. The effects of both the broken connections with the ʻāina and of family members "lost" to Kalaupapa are still felt in Hawaiʻi today.

The settlements were administered by the Board of Health, with local financial control held by Rudolph Meyer, a German immigrant who worked for the Molokaʻi Ranch and lived on the island. Local supervision for decades was by superintendents of Hawaiian and part-Hawaiian ancestry, some appointed from among the patients or family members with persons with leprosy.

Belgian missionary priests from the Congregation of the Sacred Hearts of Jesus and Mary were among those who cared for persons with leprosy on Molokaʻi. The most well-known was Belgian-born Father Damien, who served there from 1873 to his death in 1889. For his charity he was canonized by the Roman Catholic Church as a saint in 2009, the 10th person recognized in what is now the United States. Among other missionaries and caregivers, was Mother Marianne Cope, a nun and administrator of St. Joseph's Hospital in Syracuse, New York. As the General Minister of the Sisters of St. Francis of Syracuse, she brought six sisters with her to the islands to aid in the care of persons with leprosy and develop the medical facilities. Mother Marianne and sisters of her community developed hospitals, homes and schools on the islands of Oʻahu and Maui from 1883 to 1888, at which time they traveled to Kalaupapa where she lived and worked there until her death in 1918. In 2012 she was canonized as a saint by the Catholic Church. Also serving in the colony was Brother Joseph Dutton, who went to Molokaʻi in 1886 to aid the dying Father Damien.

The Congregation of the Sacred Hearts continued to have brothers who devoted their lives to work on Molokaʻi and assist the residents. From the late 20th century, recent figures included Henri Systermans and Fr. Joseph Hendricks, whose death in November 2008 marked the end of this 140-year-old tradition. Since St. Marianne arrived in 1888, sixty-five Sisters of St. Francis have maintained a continuous presence in the settlement. There are two Sisters currently residing at the Bishop Home, established by Mother Marianne in 1888 as the Charles R. Bishop Home for Unprotected Leper Girls and Women to care for those she deemed the most vulnerable of the population.

Hansen's disease, found in 1873 to be caused by a bacterium, has been curable since the 1940s with the use of modern antibiotics. There are no active cases of Hansen's disease among residents of the Kalaupapa settlement or on the island of Molokaʻi. After the management of the settlement was turned over to the National Park Service, residents of the former colony were allowed to stay if they chose to do so. They and their descendant families who wish to continue to live in the neighborhood of housing maintained on the peninsula.

As of May 2026, four named former patients are still alive, aged 85 to 102, two of which live at Kalaupapa. One year after the death of the last resident, the state of Hawaii will turn over the land to the NPS.

== Representation in popular culture ==
- After being given a high award by the Kingdom of Hawaiʻi, Belgian missionary-priest Father Damien attracted considerable publicity to the leper colony in the late 19th century; his story was recounted in popular culture and literature.
- Robert Louis Stevenson, who suffered from tuberculosis, then also incurable, visited the Molokaʻi leper colony after Father Damien's death in 1889. He was moved by Damien's care for patients and described the settlement as a "prison fortified by nature." 2000-foot-high mountains cut off the settlement from the rest of the island. He published a 6,000-word open letter praising Father Damien's work. Robert Louis Stevenson was inspired by Mother Marianne and the girls of the Bishop Home. He taught the girls croquet, sent a piano as a gift and wrote a poem to Mother Marianne and sisters. Both a letter about the girls and the poem are published in "The Life of Robert Louis Stevenson" by Graham Balfour.
- Jack London visited in 1908 and wrote the short stories, "Lepers of Molokai" and "Koolau the Leper" in response. He also wrote about his visit to the colony and the people he met there in his sailing memoir, The Cruise of the Snark (1911).
- Cecil B. DeMille's 1923 version of The Ten Commandments features a woman who escapes from a Molokai leprosy colony and becomes the mistress of Dan McTavish whom she later infects with the disease.
- James Michener's 1959 novel Hawaii describes life in the colony in the difficult early times.
- The 1999 movie Molokai: The Story of Father Damien, starring David Wenham and Kate Ceberano, and featuring Peter O'Toole and Kris Kristofferson, depicts the life of Father Damien and his work among persons with leprosy.
- Alan Brennert's 2003 novel Molokaʻi recounts some of the history of the Kalaupapa leprosy settlement through the eyes of fictional character, Rachel Kalama, exiled there at age 8.
- The colony was used as a location for a Hawaii Five-0 investigation into a murder in the episode "Kai Paʻani Nui" (Season 7, Episode 15).

== Park description ==
Kalaupapa National Historical Park, established in 1980, preserves the physical settings of the historic Hansen's disease settlements of Kalawao and Kalaupapa. The community of Kalaupapa, on the leeward side of Kalaupapa Peninsula, is still home for a few elderly surviving former Hansen's disease patients. Some were disfigured by the disease before being cured and wanted to continue refuge here. They have shared their memories and experiences of their ordeals and of life on the island.

Surviving structures at Kalawao, on the windward side of the peninsula, are the Protestant church of Siloama, established in 1866, and Saint Philomena Catholic Church, which is associated with the work of St. Father Damien.
