= John M. Systermans =

Belgian-born missionary and priest

John M. Systermans (died May 28, 1989) was a Belgian-born missionary and priest. He was born Jean-Marie Systermans, but was better known as Father Henry Systermans or Pater Henri Systermans. He was a 20th-century missionary and priest with the Congregation of the Sacred Hearts of Jesus and Mary. He served for most of his life in Hawaii most notably during the 1950s at the leper colony at Kalaupapa on Molokai. His service there followed in the tradition of fellow Belgian priest, Saint Damien, and his contributions were part of the research gathered by Gavan Daws for the definitive biography Holy Man: Father Damien of Molokai.

On August 9, 1958, he was elected as the seventh Superior General of the order. He served as a Council Father in all four sessions of the Second Vatican Council from 1962 to 1965. On April 17, 1967, Systermans was part of a delegation meeting Pope Paul VI to present petitions advocating beatification of Father Damien. He retired in 1970, and died on May 28, 1989.
