= United States Post Office (Kalaupapa, Hawaii) =

The United States Post Office in Kalaupapa, Hawaii United States is a mail facility for the USPS. The city was known for leprosy, also known today as Hansen's disease. Authorities nearly cut off the colony from mail in the early 1900s.

In the late 19th century, Hawaii established a colony in Kalaupapa to isolate those infected. The post office was a critical facility for contact and news with those outside. A.J. Knight recommended that the Kalaupapa post office be shut down. Thomas J. Flavin decided that shutting down the post office could be detrimental to the residents. The office is mandated by law to serve that area until the quantity of sufferers of Hansen's Disease is zero.

The current building was constructed in 1934, with tiles made there using local sand. Prior to the current post office being erected, another edifice called the Kalawao U.S. Post Office existed. The current structure is the sole manner in which to ship items to and from the area.

There were strict requirements for handling items entering and leaving the office. Outgoing letters had each of its four corners removed, were placed in a box that was sealed with a container of potassium permanganate to which formaldehyde was added. The employee closed the top to create a seal. The letter was kept in the container for eighteen hours.
