= Molokai: The Story of Father Damien =

1999 Belgian film by Paul Cox

- Promotional poster
- Directed by: Paul Cox
- Written by: John Briley
- Based on: biography by Hilde Eynikel
- Produced by: Tharsi Vanhuysse; Grietje Lammertyn
- Starring: David Wenham; Kate Ceberano; Derek Jacobi; Sam Neill; Kris Kristofferson; Tom Wilkinson; Peter O'Toole
- Music by: Paul Grabowsky; Wim Mertens
- Release date: March 1999 (Belgium)
- Running time: 122 minutes
- Countries: Belgium; Australia; Netherlands
- Language: English
- Budget: US $10 million

Molokai: The Story of Father Damien is a 1999 biographical film of Father Damien, a Belgian priest working at the Kalaupapa Leprosy Settlement on the Hawaiian island of Molokai. It was directed by Paul Cox.

== Plot ==
With the coming of more immigrants from Asia, cases of leprosy began to appear around the Hawaiian islands in the late 19th century. As it spreads, a colony for the isolation and care of lepers was established on the isolated Kalaupapa peninsula on the northern side of the island of Molokai. The Hawaiian government, with support from the Catholic and other churches sent almost all lepers to the colony. The Catholic Bishop who is in charge of the place feels a need to send some priests there to administer last rites to people shortly before their deaths. Fr. Damien volunteers and is sent to the island with the caution from the Bishop that he shall not touch any of the patients. Fr. Damien is welcomed at the island by Rudolph Meyer, a man who is a Lutheran who takes care of the provisions sent by the government to the island. The Lutheran points to a mountain and tells him that whoever tries to go beyond it is shot dead to prevent the spread of the disease. On his arrival Damien finds that the little chapel in the island has not been properly taken care of and is ruined. He restores the chapel. With God as his sole help, he starts his work at Molokai. A boy who comes to the chapel volunteers to become the altar boy. The boy is the first person Fr. Damien touches. Near to the chapel Father meets a Protestant Englishman turned a patient who was once a medical assistant in Honolulu (a city in another island). He finds it very difficult to adjust with the church but Fr. Damien's presence is some consolation to him. (He later dies and is buried in the Catholic cemetery). The Bishop who is so considerate relates with Damien's provincial that there is a report about the Father, describing him as 'The Christian Hero' by the prime minister.

Soon a doctor arrives who belongs to Congregational Church and communicates to him that there is a Chinese medicine named Hoang Nan which might be of some help to the patients. The Father with the help of the doctor gives the medicine to some of the patients. During that, Damien informs the doctor about the pathetic conditions of the patients including the sad fate of those who await death in a settlement, only to be replaced by others like them if they are to be found dead on the following day.

Father Damien also relates to him about the stealing and robbery and some of the immoral activities go on there because of their desperate lot who have nothing else to do other than to await their death. A woman friend among others named Malulani is a great help to Fr. Damien although she has romantic feelings toward him which he admonishes. Later the letters Damien sent to his brother become news in the papers and this troubles the authority, especially the prime minister. Father Damien continues his work among the lepers, despite the difficulties with lack of provisions and insufficient funds. When he finds his letters serve no purpose, he pays a visit to the authority which also brings no significant change. The Bishop, who, after finding no one to attend Father Damien's confession, decides to go there himself. However, he is only allowed to give the absolution on board the ship while Father Damien stays on a boat. Damien has gradually developed symptoms of the disease because of his closer caring for the patients.

The doctor leaves Damien as he finds the situation unbearable, and also because he wants to get married. But the doctor's absence is maintained by Brother Joseph Dutton whom Prof. Clifford sent there. One day the crown princess of Hawaii pays a visit promising help to the suffering. The government is however still reluctant to help Damien the way he needs. Once when the weather is not so calm the captain of a ship with lepers orders his crew to toss them to the sea. Father Damien tries desperately to save a few. Meanwhile, his disease develops to worse states and he is still not offered much help. However, a new priest arrives at Molokai to assist him later followed by nuns. Soon the desperate Father succumbs to death with a hope of joining his fellow members in heaven.

== Cast ==
- David Wenham as Father Damien
- Kate Ceberano as Crown Princess Liliʻuokalani
- Jan Decleir as Bishop Köckerman
- Chris Haywood as Clayton Strawn
- Derek Jacobi as Father Leonor Fouesnel
- Keanu Kapuni-Szasz as Malulani
- Alice Krige as Mother Marianne Cope
- Kris Kristofferson as Rudolph Meyer
- Leo McKern as Bishop Maigret
- Sam Neill as Prime Minister Walter M. Gibson
- Peter O'Toole as William Williamson
- Dirk Roofthooft as Father Louis Lambert Conrardy
- Tom Wilkinson as Brother Joseph Dutton
- Aden Young as Dr. Kalewis
- Kate Agnew as Sister Leopoldina Burns
- Michael W. Perry as Dr. Trousseau

== Production ==
The film was the idea of producer Tharsi Vanhuysse, who was inspired after Father Damien's beatification in 1995. He hired Paul Cox to direct and John Briley to write the screenplay.

David Wenham's casting was announced in April 1998.

Filming took place on Molokai and Oahu, with some shooting in Honolulu, from July to August 1998. During filming the producers fired Cox but he was rehired after the locals objected. Cox delivered his cut of the film in October. The producer then recut it. A judge halted production in January 1999. Cox was eventually allowed to edit the movie.

== Reception ==
The film was screened in Hawaii in September 1999 but its general release was held up due to legal issues.

David Stratton called it "a flawed, but fascinating, film. The scenes on the island with the lepers, which showcase David Wenham`s remarkable performance, are the best, and there are some fine performances in minor roles."

Cox later returned to Hawaii to make a film about the island of Molokai, Kalaupapa Heaven.
