= Leopoldina Burns =

American Third Order Franciscan and missionary

Mary Leopoldina Burns TOSF
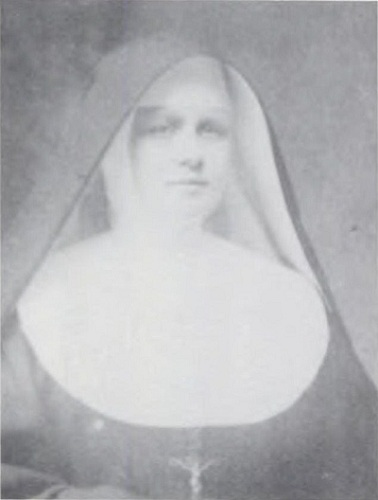
- Sister Leopoldina Burns in 1886
- Born: August 28, 1856; Utica, New York, United States
- Died: June 3, 1942 (Age 85); Honolulu, Hawaii

Mary Leopoldina Burns (August 28, 1856 – June 3, 1942), was an American religious sister who was a member of the Sisters of St Francis of Syracuse, New York, and a close companion and biographer of Marianne Cope during the 1883 Hansen's Disease epidemic on the island of Molokaʻi, Hawaii.

Born on August 28, 1856, Mary Leopoldina was the daughter of James and Mary Burns, of Utica, New York. She joined the Sisters of St Francis of Syracuse, New York, a congregation of the Third Order of Saint Francis, in 1881. Together with Marianne Cope and five other sisters, they departed from Syracuse to travel to Honolulu to answer the request of King Kalākaua of Hawaii to care for leprosy sufferers arriving on November 8, 1883. They traveled on the SS Mariposa. With Mother Marianne as supervisor, the sisters' task was to manage Kakaʻako Branch Hospital on Oʻahu, which served as a receiving station for Hansen's disease patients gathered from all over the islands. The more severe cases were processed and shipped to the island of Molokaʻi for confinement in the settlement at Kalawao, and then later at Kalaupapa.

In 1889, together with Mother Marianne and Sister Vincentia McCormick, they opened and ran a girls' school in Hawaii, which they named in Henry Perrine Baldwin's honor, a prominent local businessman who supported their missions.

After serving for nearly 40 years on Molokai, Sister Leopoldina retired in 1928 to the St. Francis Convent in Manoa Valley where she lived until her death. Sister Leopoldina died on June 3, 1942, with the reputation for holiness. She was the last of the Catholic sisters to serve alongside Father Damien.
