= Pater Damiaan terug =

- Directed by: Clemens De Landtsheer
- Release date: 1936
- Running time: 50 minutes
- Country: Belgium
- Language: Dutch

Pater Damiaan terug is a 1936 silent documentary short directed by Clemens De Landtsheer. It deals with the return of the last remains of Belgian priest Father Damien from Molokai to his birthplace in Belgium.
