= Masanao =

- Gender: Male

Origin
- Origin: Japanese
- Meaning: Different meanings depending on the kanji used

Masanao (written: 政直, 正直, 昌直 or 雅尚) is a masculine Japanese given name. Notable people with the name include:

- Masanao Goto (後藤 昌直; 1857–1908), Japanese physician
- Masanao Hanihara (埴原 正直; 1876–1934), Japanese diplomat
- Hoshina Masanao (保科 正直; 1542–1601), Japanese daimyō
- Inoue Masanao (井上 正直; 1837–1904), Japanese daimyō
- Kinoshita Masanao (木下 昌直; died 1584), Japanese samurai
- Nakamura Masanao (中村 正直; 1832–1891), Japanese samurai, philosopher and educator
- Masanao Ozaki (尾崎 正直; born 1967), Japanese politician
- Masanao Sasaki (佐々木 雅尚; born 1962), Japanese footballer
- Tokusegawa Masanao (德瀬川 正直; born 1983), Mongolian sumo wrestler
- Tsuchiya Masanao (土屋 政直; 1641–1722), Japanese daimyō
- Masanao of Kyoto (正直, mid-late 1700s), netsuke sculptor
