= Charles McEwen Hyde =

Missionary (1832–1899)

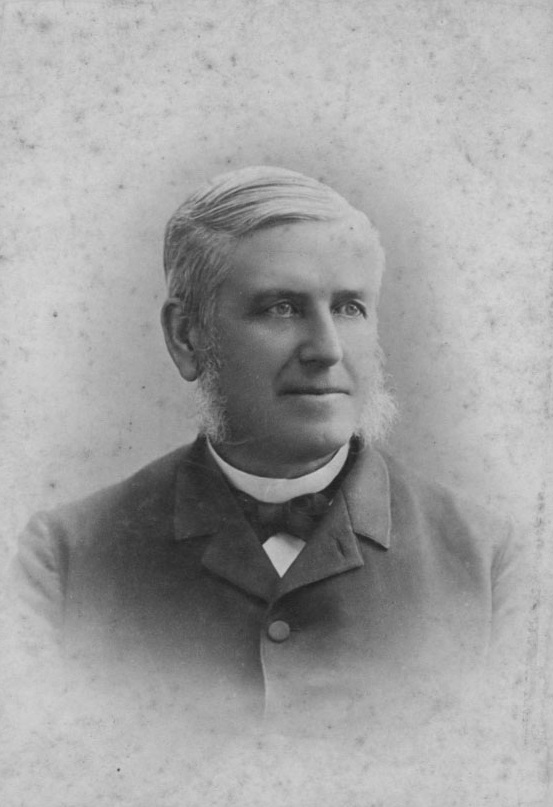
- Born: June 8, 1832; New York City
- Died: October 13, 1899 (aged 67); Honolulu, Territory of Hawaii
- Education: Williams College; Union Theological Seminary; Princeton Theological Seminary
- Known for: Missionary to Hawaii
- Spouse: Mary Knight
- Children: Henry Knight Hyde; Charles K Hyde

Charles McEwen Hyde (June 8, 1832 – October 13, 1899) was a Congregationalist missionary who arrived in Hawaii in 1877. He was instrumental in establishing and supporting schools to educate and train the Hawaiian population of the time. Hyde mentored native Hawaiians who wanted to enter the Christian ministry, and he helped provide smallpox vaccinations for the population. He was a descendant of Scottish Covenanters, and one of the original five trustees of Kamehameha Schools. Private correspondence about Father Damien, penned by Hyde and published without his permission, sparked a heated public rebuke from Robert Louis Stevenson who expressed his belief that sainthood lay ahead for Damien.

== Background ==
Hyde was born June 8, 1832, in New York City to attorney Joseph Hyde and Catherine McEwen Hyde. His paternal grandfather Alvan Hyde had been a Christian minister in Massachusetts, and his paternal great-grandfather Joseph Hyde was a Connecticut farmer. Hyde's maternal grandfather Charles McEwen was a New York judge who was active in the Bible Society, and a descendant of the original Covenanters in Scotland. He spoke both Greek and Latin and was enrolled in Williams College at age 16. Hyde was valedictorian of his graduating class. His classmates remembered him as a likeable and respectful, well-mannered, person who was a natty dresser. Upon graduation, he earned money as a private tutor, and in 1853 enrolled at Union Theological Seminary in New York. Prior to his later enrolling at Princeton Theological Seminary, he gained career experience teaching at a college. Hyde was ordained as a Congregational minister on August 19, 1862, and received his calling to his first church at Brimfield, Massachusetts. In 1872, he received his D.D. degree.

== Hawaii ==
On March 21, 1877, the American Board of Commissioners for Foreign Missions sent Rev. and Mrs. Hyde and a small group of clergy to their Hawaii mission field. The group arrived in Honolulu in June. Upon arrival, the Hydes took up temporary residence in the home of Samuel Northrup Castle, who shortly thereafter built a home for the Hydes. Hyde immediately organized the North Pacific Missionary Institute. He quickly picked up the Hawaiian language in order to converse with the indigenous population, and began delivering his sermons in Hawaiian. Hyde and his wife tried to instill work ethics into the Hawaiian males, and teach housekeeping skills to the women. They also opened their home to the local population and often provided monetary assistance to those in need. He helped provide smallpox vaccinations for the local population. For the Hawaiian men who wanted to serve as Christian ministers, Hyde became a mentor.

He later became president of the Board of Trustees of the Kawaiahaʻo Female Seminary, which helped train women who were interested in becoming wives of Christian ministers. He was also president of Punahou School. When Bernice Pauahi Bishop wrote her will on October 31, 1883, she named Hyde as one of the original five trustees of her estate.

== Father Damien and Robert Louis Stevenson ==
On August 2, 1889, Hyde wrote a private letter to a Reverend H.B. Gage, regarding Father Damien of Molokai. Hyde intimated that Damien's death from leprosy was the result of what Hyde believed to be the priest's lack of hygiene, and was seemingly dismissive of Damien as a person. Without Hyde's permission, the correspondence was published in a Sydney, Australia newspaper, and angered many of Damien's supporters. Author Robert Louis Stevenson took umbrage in the 1890 published pamphlet Open Letter to Reverend Doctor Hyde of Honolulu from Robert Louis Stevenson. Stevenson accurately saw sainthood for Father Damien, who became Hawaii's first official saint on November 10, 2009.

... if that world at all remember you, on the day when Father Damien of Molokai shall be named Saint, it will be in virtue of one work: your letter to Reverend H.B. Gage.

— Robert Louis Stevenson to Rev. Hyde

== Final years and death ==
He became interested in the Christian ministry in Europe and Asia. In 1893, Rev. and Mrs. Hyde toured Europe, and in 1897 they toured Japan and China.

Hyde died October 13, 1899. His funeral was held at the Central Union Church in Honolulu.
