= Most Sacred Heart of Jesus Catholic Church (Hawi, Hawaii) =

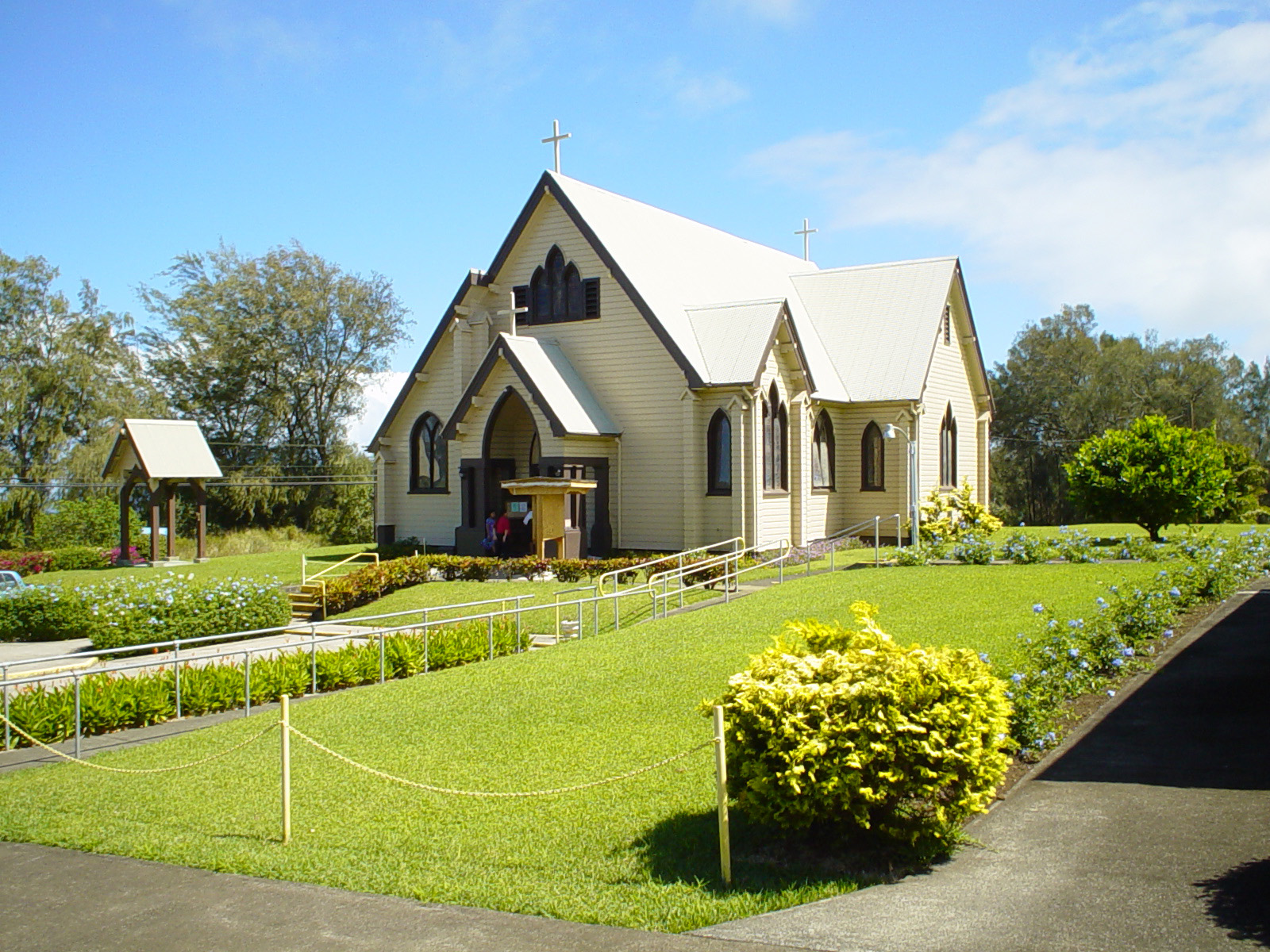
Most Sacred Heart of Jesus Roman Catholic Church in Hāwī, Kohala, Hawaii

Most Sacred Heart of Jesus Catholic Church in Hāwī, North Kohala, is a historic parish in the West Hawaii Vicariate of the Catholic Diocese of Honolulu. The parish campus includes an architecturally remarkable historic church, a rectory, a church cemetery, and a parish hall.

== History ==
About 1841, a series of priests, beginning with Father Arsenius Walsh, SS.CC., began ministering to Kohala natives. He was successively followed by Fathers Dennis Maudet, SS.CC., Stanislaus Lebret, SS.CC., and Eustache Maheu, SS.CC. Father Maheu built the Waiʻāpuka Catholic Church and dedicated it to Saint Louis. Father Maheu died on August 25, 1860.

Saint Damien de Veuster of Molokaʻi, SS.CC., served as the pastor of the Kohala mission for eight years from 1865 until 1873. During his tenure, he built the first Kohala Catholic Church at Halawa, dedicated under the title of Our Lady of Victory. Father Gulstan Ropert, SS.CC., followed Father Damien in 1873, building the first Catholic school on the island dedicated under the title of Saint Ann at Halaʻula. Father Ropert constructed another church (since demolished) in Kapaʻau dedicated under the title of Saint Anthony of Padua located between the Bond Memorial Library and the Kohala Dispensary.

Stained-glass window, donated by William Desmond, of Jesus calling the Apostles

Memorial plaque commemorating the pastorate from 1865 to 1873 of Saint Damien

The first Sacred Heart Church was built in Hawi in 1905 by Father Aloysius Borghouts, SS.CC.; this church was later moved to Halawa. The second and present structure was built by Father Ludger Appleman, SS.CC., in 1925. This cruciform church, with beautiful stained-glass windows and ecclesiastical appointments was consecrated by co-adjutor Vicar Apostolic of the Hawaiian Islands, Msgr. Stephen Alencastre, SS.CC., under the title of the Most Sacred Heart of Jesus Christ, to which the Hawaiian mission of the Congregation of the Sacred Hearts of Jesus and Mary, or Picpus Fathers, dedicated itself. The Picpus Fathers were a French missionary order that established the Catholic Church in the Vicariate Apostolic of Oriental Oceania, now, the State of Hawai‘i, and that part of French Polynesia that includes Tahiti and the Marquesas Islands. Shortly after the dedication of its church, the parish of Sacred Heart in Hawaii was canonically erected in 1926. The stained glass windows were crafted by artisans in Belgium and were donated by various members of the church. The church currently has a mission in Halaʻula under the title of Our Lady of Grace.

It is located at 55-3374 Akoni Pule Highway in the town of Hāwī, adjacent to the Hāwī Cemetery, coordinates 20°14′16″N 155°50′3″W.
