= Masanao Goto =

Japanese leprologist

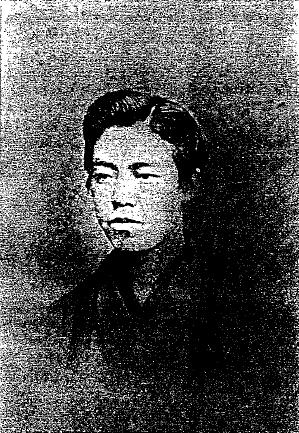
Masanao Goto

Masanao Goto (後藤 昌直, Gotō Masanao; March 6, 1857 – July 9, 1908) was a Japanese leprologist. He was the son of first Shobun Gotō and was called the "second Shobun Gotō". He devoted his life to leprosy patients in Japan and on the island of Molokai in the Kingdom of Hawaii.

Father Damien had trust in Gotō's therapy, and he left the message, "I have not the slightest confidence in our American and European doctors to stay my leprosy, I wish to be treated by Dr. Masanao Gotō."

== See also ==
- Father Damien
- King David Kalakaua
- Walter M. Gibson
- Kalaupapa National Historical Park
