= Kauhakō Crater =

Crater in Hawaii, United States

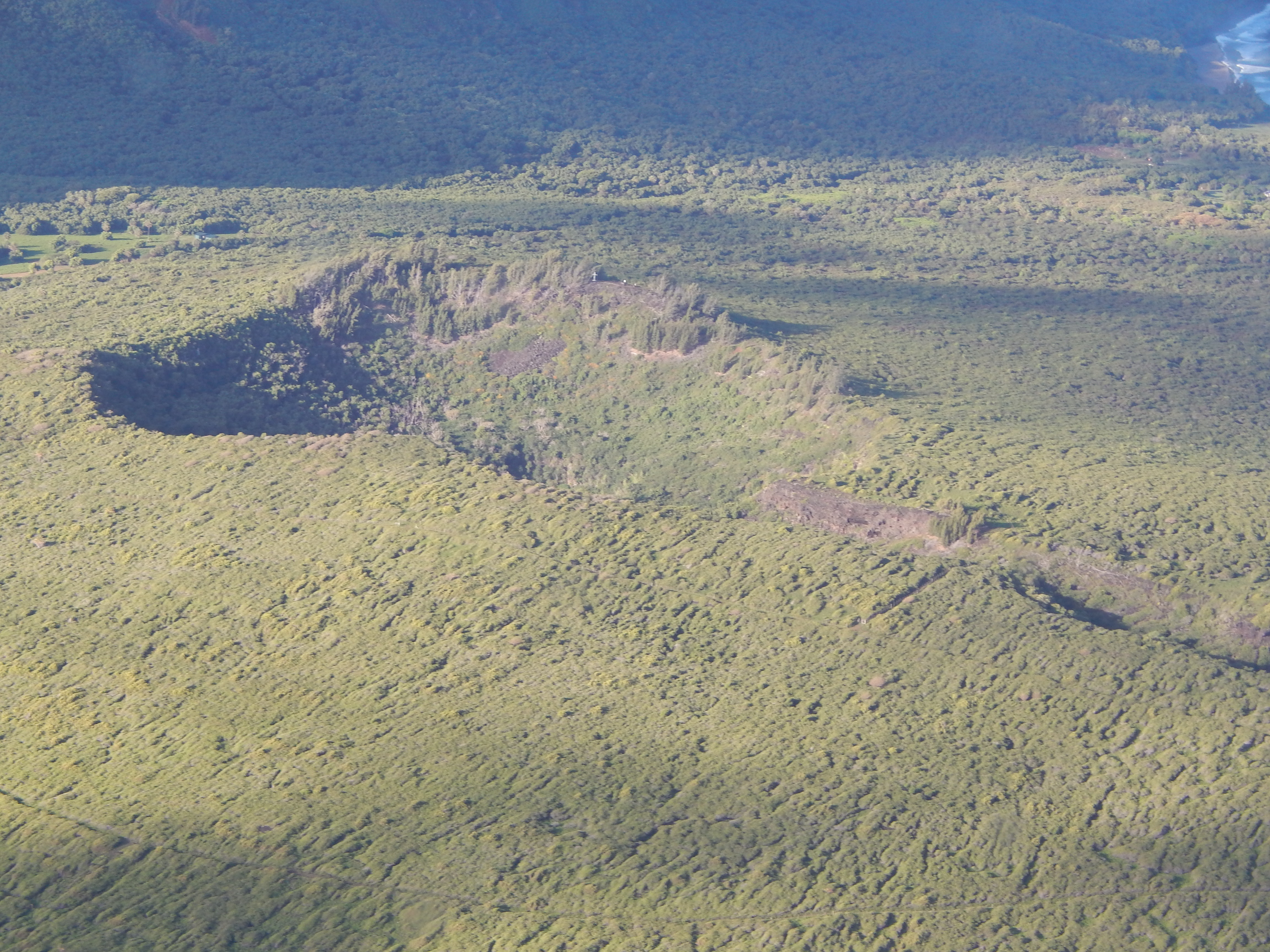
- Kauhakō Crater

Highest point
- Elevation: 150 m (490 ft)
- Coordinates: 21°11′16″N 156°57′58″W

Geography
- Location within Hawaii
- Location: Hawaii, United States

Geology
- Mountain type: Volcanic crater

Kauhakō Crater is a volcanic crater located in Kalawao County, Hawaii, United States. The crater was formed between 230,000 and 300,000 years ago, as the result of the eruption of volcano Pu'u' 'Uao. It is located in the center of the Kalaupapa Peninsula on the island of Molokaʻi, and has a diameter of 500 metres (1,600 ft) by 650 metres (2,130 ft). Lake Kauhakō, located at the bottom of the crater, has the world's greatest depth-to-surface area ratio of a lake and is the tenth deepest lake in the United States. In 2011, the lake underwent an overturning event, causing hydrogen sulfide to float to the surface of the lake and lifeforms, including shrimp and plankton, to disappear.

== Formation ==
Kauhakō Crater is thought to have formed around 230,000 to 300,000 years ago. Somewhere within this time period, Pu'u 'Uao, an undersea volcano located near what is now the peninsula, first erupted. After this, it continued to erupt several more times, spewing hot, fast lava. When this lava eventually cooled, the peninsula was formed, including Kauhakō Crater.

== Geography and geology ==
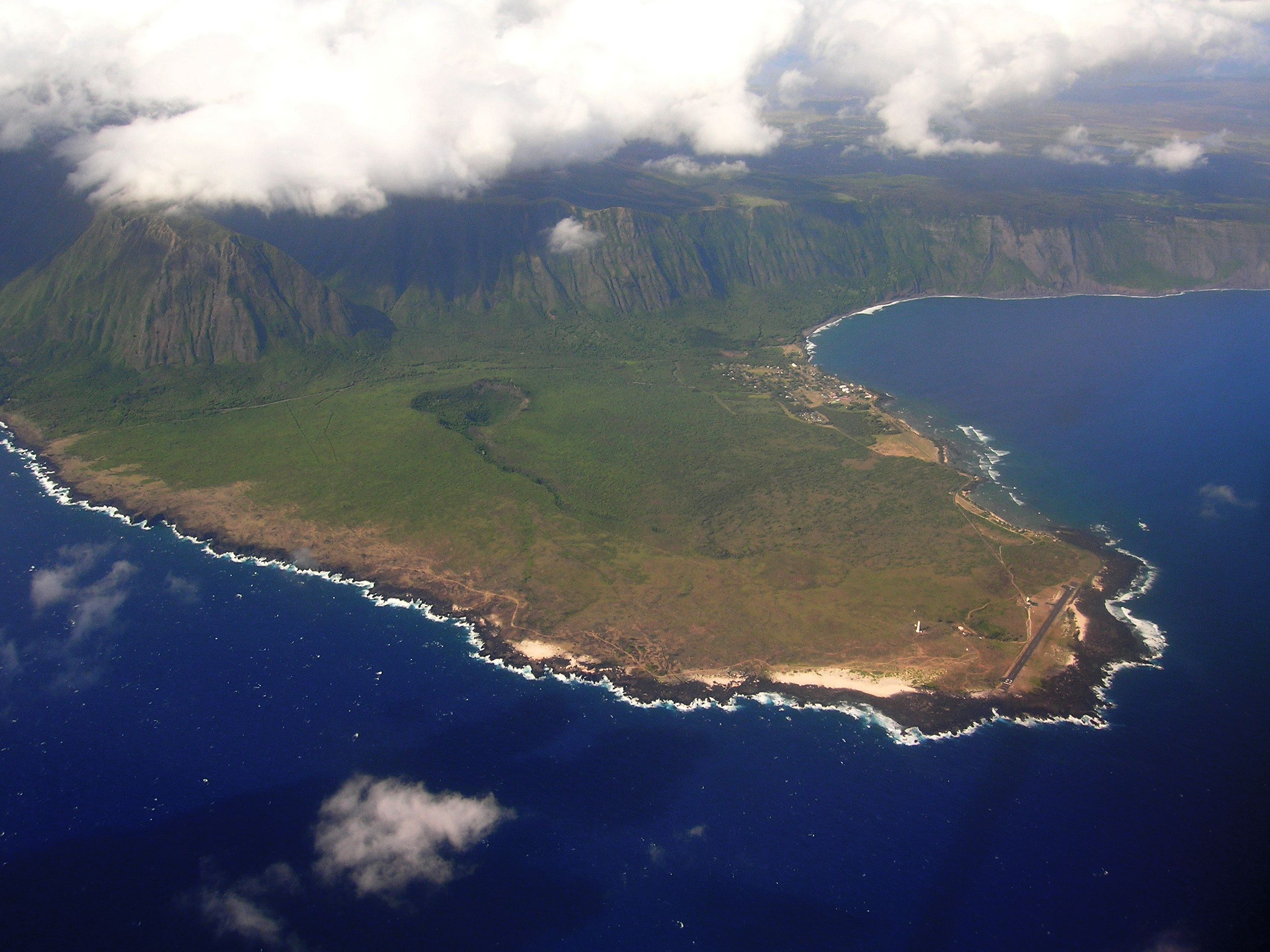
Kauhakō Crater's location on the Kalaupapa Peninsula.

Kauhakō Crater is found in the center of the Kalaupapa Peninsula. It is located inside a volcanic rim, which is roughly 500 feet (150 m) above sea level, making it the highest point on the peninsula. The crater's diameter is 500 metres (1,600 ft) by 650 metres (2,130 ft), and is funnel-like in shape. A single terrace roughly 150 meters wide is located in the crater, above the lake. Much of the crater is forested, containing many types of shrubs and trees, such as the wiliwili, a plant native to the area, but mostly non-native plants, including invasive Schinus terebinthifolia (Brazilian peppertree) and Lantana camara (big-sage). A survey observed that black rats in the area were destroying certain native plants in the crater, particularly the endemic tree species Reynoldsia sandwicensis.

The crater contains many lava channels and tubes, which vary significantly in size. In particular, a kilometer-long lava channel, which is up to 150 meters wide and 30 meters deep, begins at the crater's northeastern side and continues north. This channel contains many smaller channels and tubes that branch out of it.

== Lake ==
The crater contains a lake named Lake Kauhakō at the bottom. The lake has a depth of 248 metres (814 ft), as confirmed by the U.S. Navy, and a much lesser width of 50 metres (160 ft), making the depth-to-surface area ratio of the lake greater than any other lake in the world. It is also the tenth-deepest lake in the United States. The shallower parts of the lake contain brackish water and are full of oxygen, which is where most of the plants and animals of the lake live, including plankton, shrimp, and copepods.

The lake's water quality is inspected by the National Park Service 4 times a year, which has occurred since 2009. In September 2011, the NPS saw that the surface of the lake was covered in a white layer, which revealed that hydrogen sulfide was floating to the surface of the lake and into the atmosphere. It is believed that this event occurred either due to a drought that caused the surface water, which contained a large amount of oxygen, to evaporate, or because of a landslide. After this overturning event, multiple aspects of the water quality changed significantly, most notably the oxygen level; In August, the percentage of dissolved oxygen (relative to saturation) was 227.37 (i.e. supersaturated); however, it dropped to 2.52 by November. This caused much of the life in the lake to die, including shrimp and phytoplankton.

Before this event, no instance of the lake being unusual was recorded from observation, nor has anything similar been recorded in historical times. After the event, the lake was observed consistently for a while. Observations on December 8 and December 12, 2011 showed that the layer was gone and the lake was a bluish green color, but there were still no shrimp. A few days later, on December 14, the lake was covered in a green layer of phytoplankton due to a heavy rain the last 48 hours. This caused shrimp and other forms of life to appear again, but by December 16, there was no life at the lake and it was colored bluish green again.
