= United States Post Office (Lihue, Hawaii) =

- U.S. Post Office-Lihue
- U.S. National Register of Historic Places
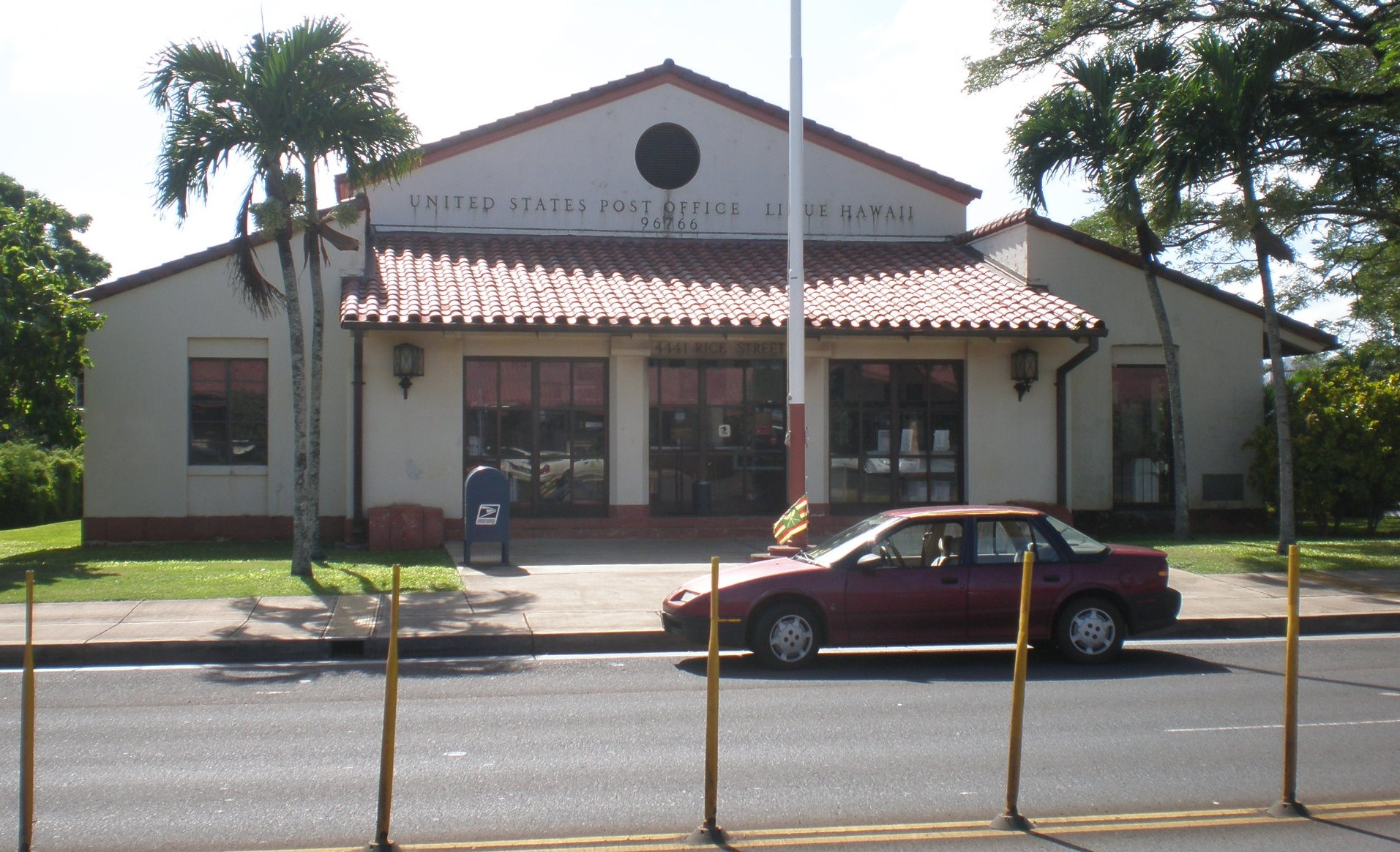

- Location within Hawaii
- Location: 4441 Rice Street, Lihue, Hawaii
- Coordinates: 21°58′46″N 159°22′19″W
- Area: 0.6 acres (0.24 ha)
- Built: 1939
- Architect: Louis A. Simon
- Architectural style: Mission Revival
- NRHP reference No.: 89002011
- Added to NRHP: November 28, 1989

The Lihue Post Office in Lihue, Hawaii, was built in 1939. It was listed on the National Register of Historic Places as U.S. Post Office-Lihue in 1989.

The Mission Revival style architecture of the building is an accommodation to local citizens who did not want the standard neo-classical design of many mainland U.S. post offices.

== See also ==
- List of United States post offices
