= Joseph Dutton =

Catholic missionary (1843–1931)

Servant of God Joseph Dutton TOSF
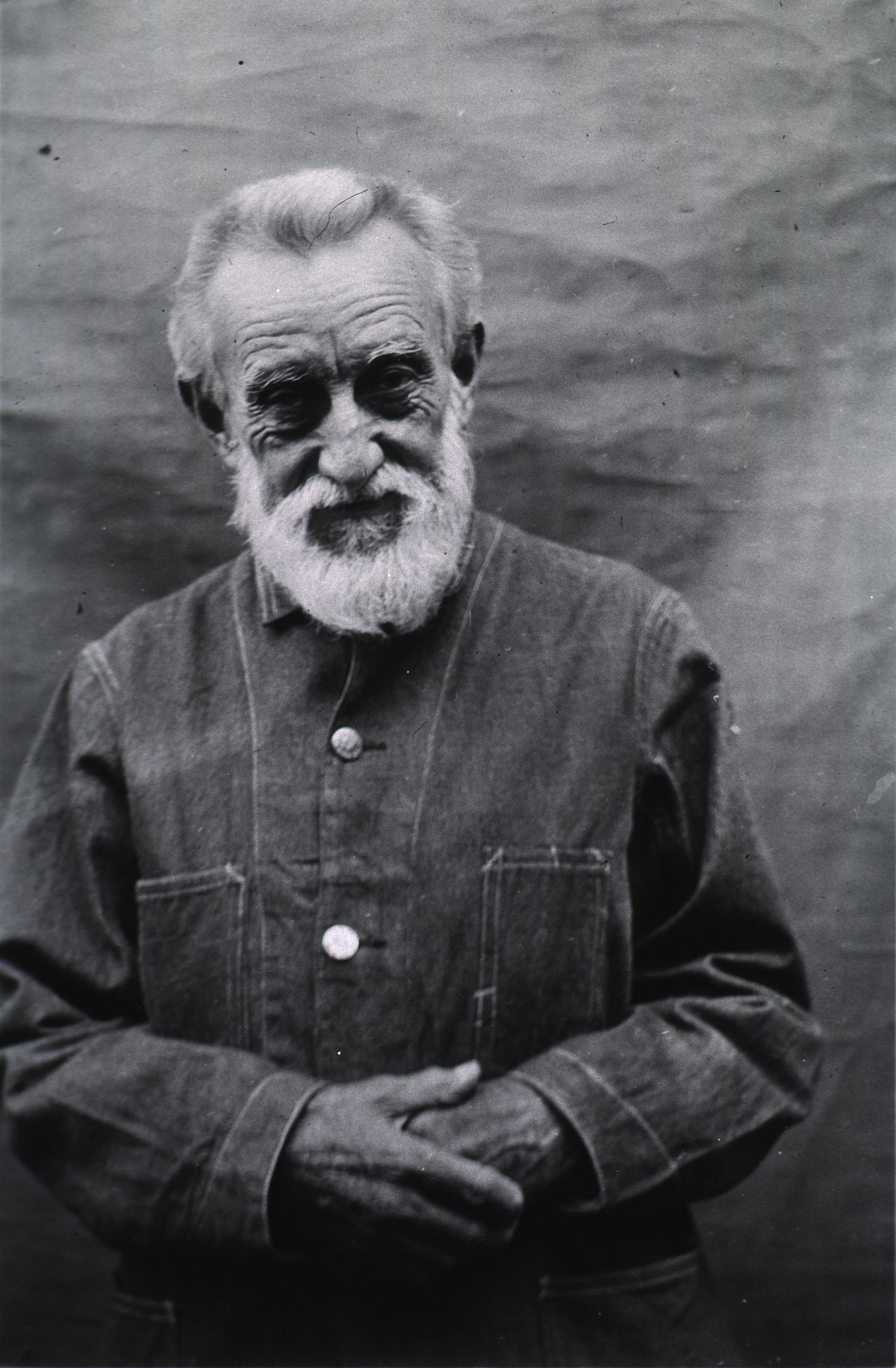
- Joseph Dutton in 1922
- Born: Ira Barnes Dutton; April 27, 1843; Stowe, Vermont, U.S.
- Died: March 26, 1931 (aged 87); Honolulu, Hawaiʻi Territory
- Education: Milton Academy
- Military career
- Allegiance: United States (Union)
- Branch: Union Army
- Service years: 1861–1865
- Rank: First lieutenant
- Unit: 13th Wisconsin Infantry Regiment
- Conflicts: American Civil War

Joseph Dutton, TOSF (born Ira Barnes Dutton; April 27, 1843 – March 26, 1931) was an American Civil War veteran and Union Army lieutenant who converted to Catholicism and later worked as a missionary with Damien of Molokai. He was a Third Order Secular Franciscan. His cause for canonization was opened in 2022.

== Biography ==
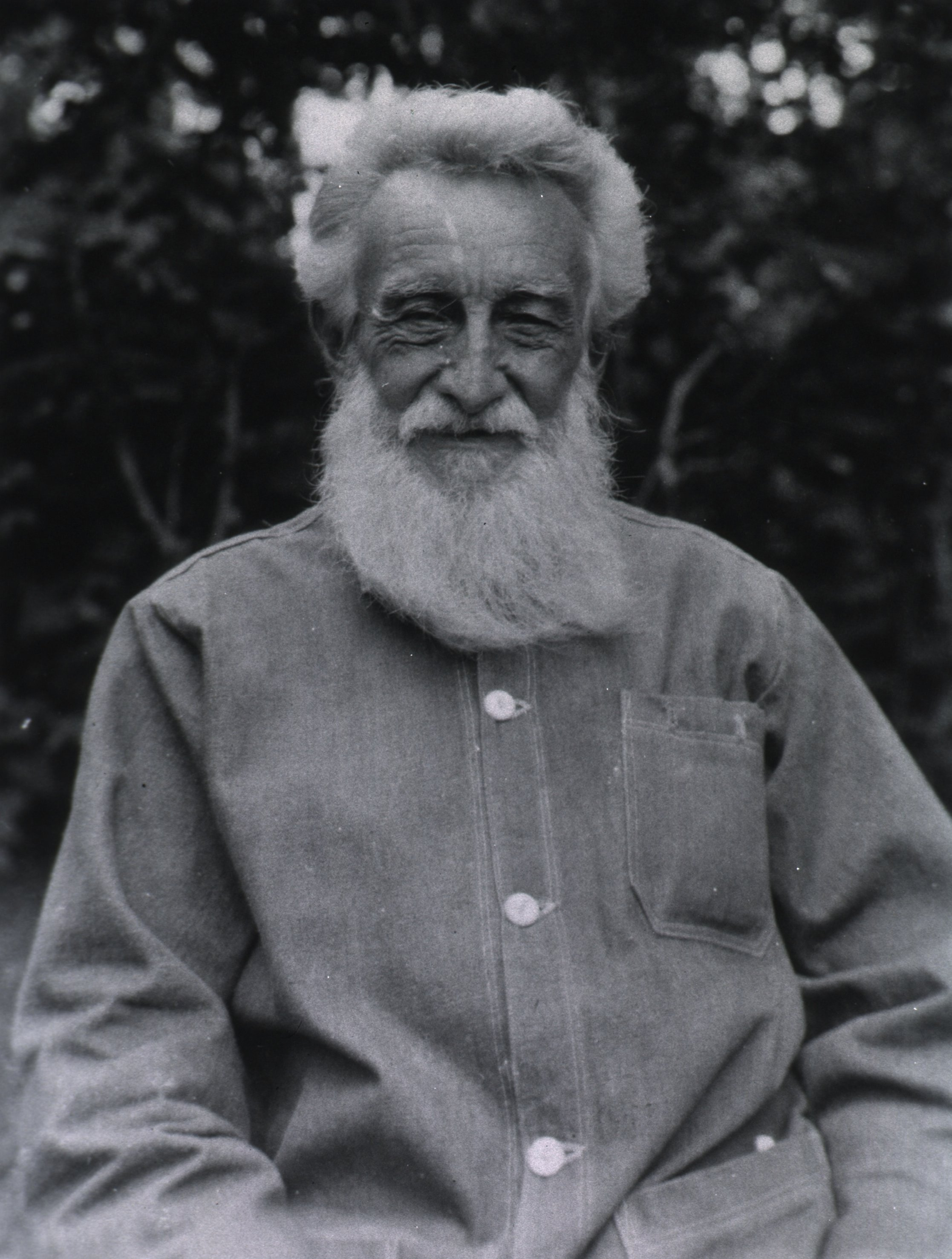
Dutton in 1928

He was born Ira Barnes Dutton in Stowe, Vermont, and was the son of Ezra Dutton and Abigail Barnes. His father was a cobbler and his mother was a schoolteacher.

Dutton carried out his studies at Old Academy and Milton Academy in Wisconsin. He had been raised Protestant in Baptist Sunday schools. In 1861, Dutton enlisted in 13th Wisconsin Infantry under Colonel Maurice Maloney. He served in the Quartermaster Corps of the 13th Wisconsin Infantry Regiment during the American Civil War. Dutton began in the Union Army as a private and left as a first lieutenant and the regimental quartermaster. He married during the Civil War. Prior to his marriage, Dutton was warned about his future wife's reputation for promiscuity, but had hoped he could change her. The marriage did not last as his wife (who he never mentioned by name) was unfaithful and Dutton developed alcoholism. His wife was an oniomaniac who left him broke and ran off with another man.

After the Civil War, Dutton oversaw a distillery in Alabama and later worked on the railroads in Memphis, Tennessee. He quit drinking in 1876 and later took the name Joseph. He seemed to believe his wife would return, and did not sign the divorce papers until 1881.

He converted to Catholicism in 1883 and afterward spent 20 months at the Trappist monastery at the Abbey of Our Lady of Gethsemani. He adopted the name Joseph as his religious name on his 40th birthday. In 1886, Dutton went to aid Saint Damien of Molokai, who had been recently diagnosed with leprosy and was grateful for Dutton's assistance. Dutton remembered that he told Father Damien "My name is Joseph Dutton; I’ve come to help, and I’ve come to stay" upon meeting him—and he did stay, for the remainder of his life. After Father Damien's death, Dutton founded the Baldwin Home for Men and Boys with financial assistance from Henry Perrine Baldwin.

Dutton was received into the Secular Franciscan Order in 1892. He was often known as "Brother Joseph." He became the head of the Baldwin Home for Boys in 1895, where he worked for 35 years.

Dutton wrote the article "Molokai" for the Catholic Encyclopedia, and composed and sent many letters detailing life on the island, and U. S. President Theodore Roosevelt was one of those who read of his service to the ailing. He was so impressed by the veteran's work that he ordered the United States Navy's Great White Fleet to pay tribute to him by dipping their flags as they passed by the island.

Dutton died in Honolulu on March 26, 1931, in Hawaiʻi. He was buried at St. Philomena Catholic Church Cemetery, Kalaupapa.

== Veneration ==
In 2015, the Diocese of Honolulu set up a committee to evaluate the possibility of canonization. In December 2015, the Joseph Dutton Guild was established by the Diocese of Honolulu to petition the Diocese of Honolulu to start the formal cause of beatification and canonization. His cause for canonization was opened in 2022.
