= Kalaupapa, Hawaii =

Unincorporated community in Hawaii, US

Kalaupapa
- Unincorporated community
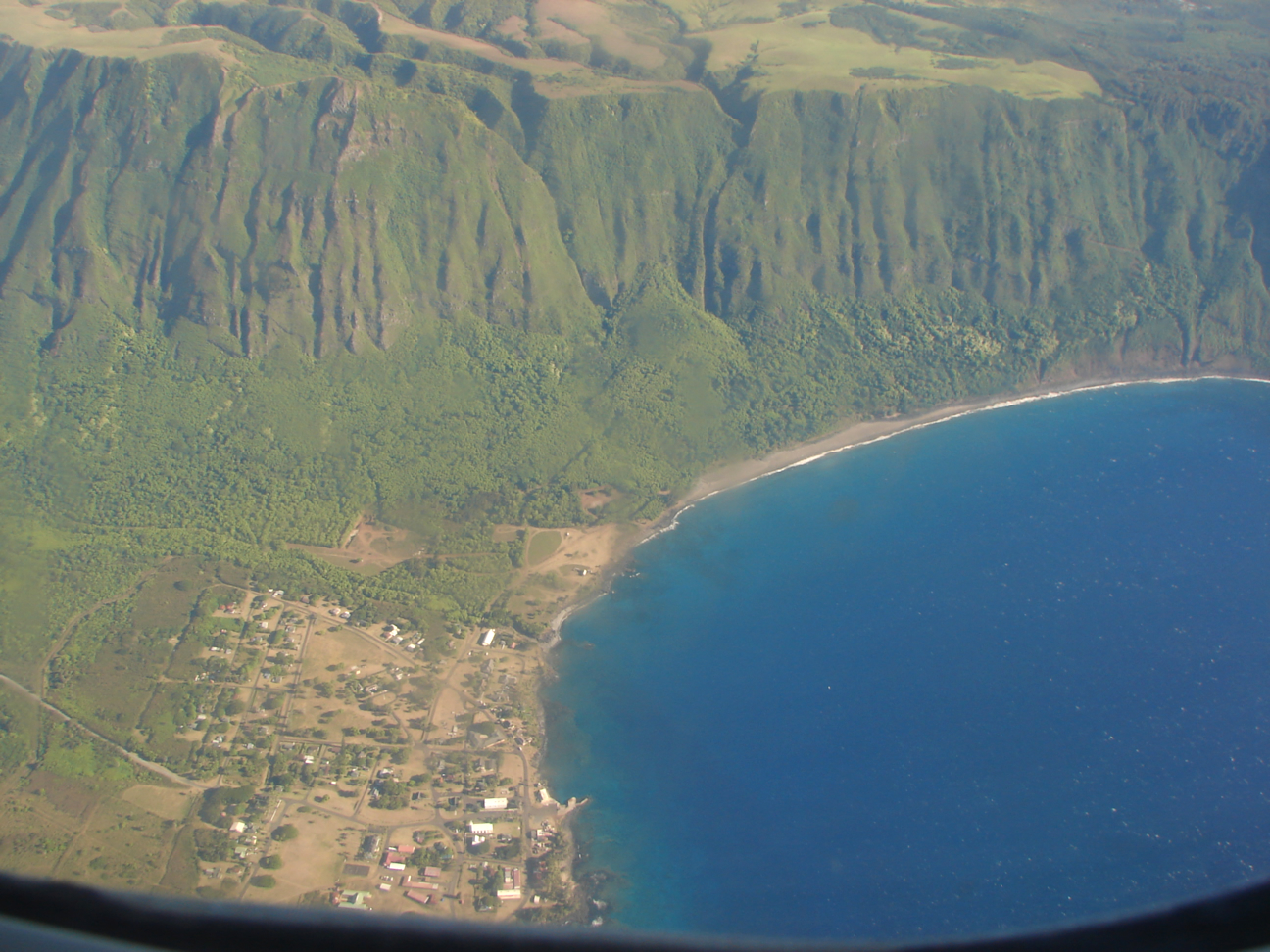
- Most of the village of Kalaupapa as seen from an airplane. This photo also includes a section of the sea cliffs that form a natural barrier between the Kalaupapa Peninsula and "Topside" Molokaʻi.
- Interactive map of Kalaupapa
- Location within Hawaii
- Coordinates: 21°11′22″N 156°58′54″W
- Country: United States
- State: Hawaii
- County: Kalawao
- Established: 1866
- Elevation: 66 ft (20 m)

Population (2020)
  - Total: 82
- Time zone: UTC-10 (Hawaii-Aleutian)
- ZIP codes: 96742
- GNIS feature ID: 360096

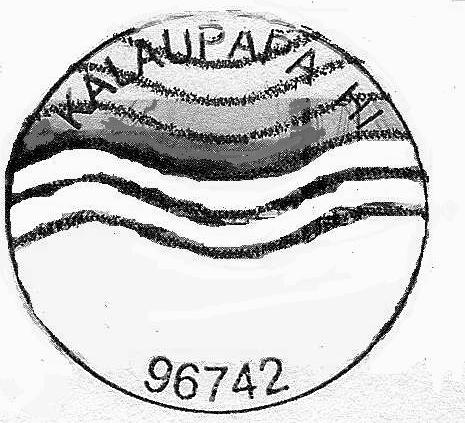
Kalaupapa postmark

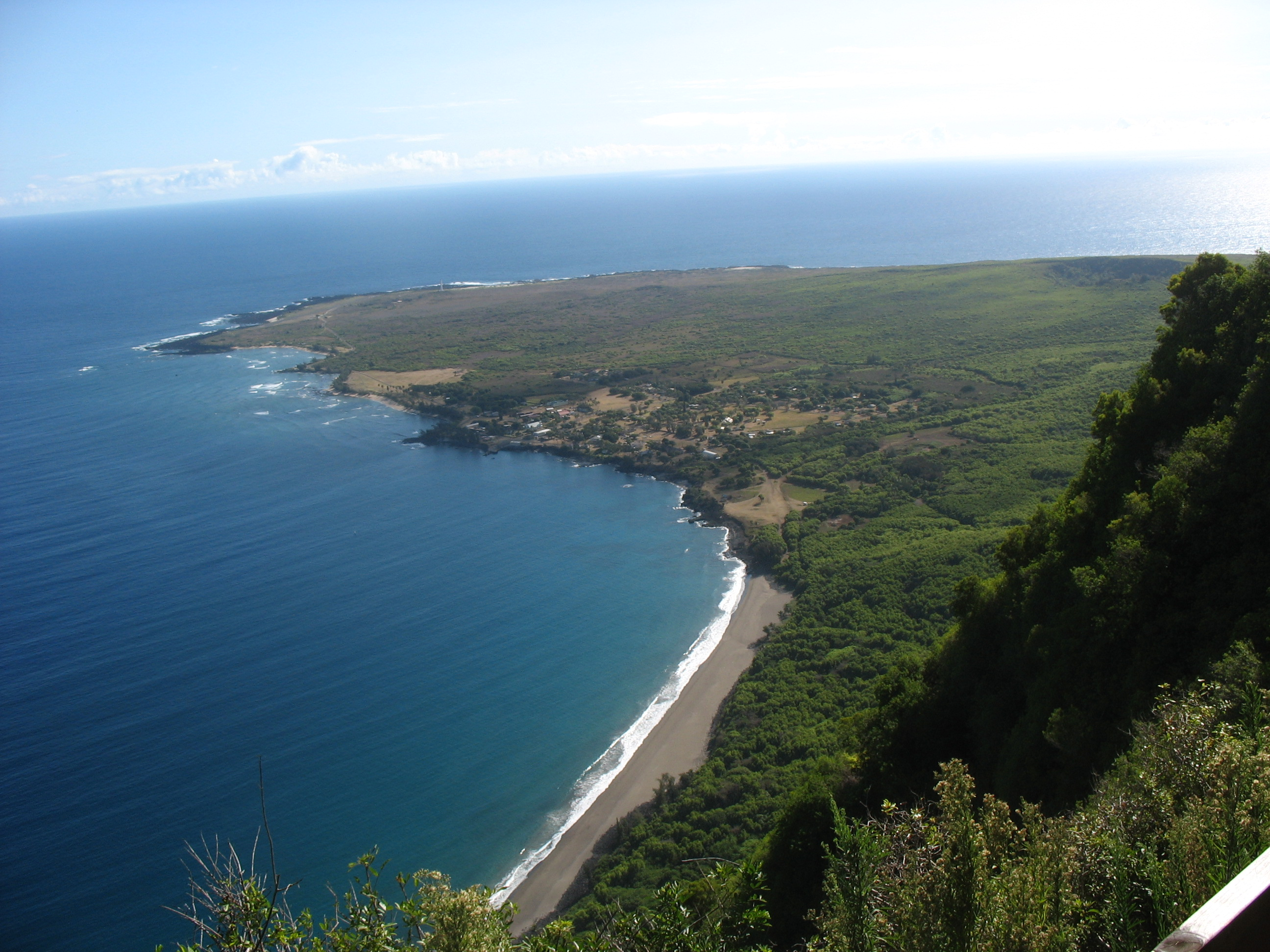
Kalaupapa Peninsula as seen from a descent down the sea cliffs

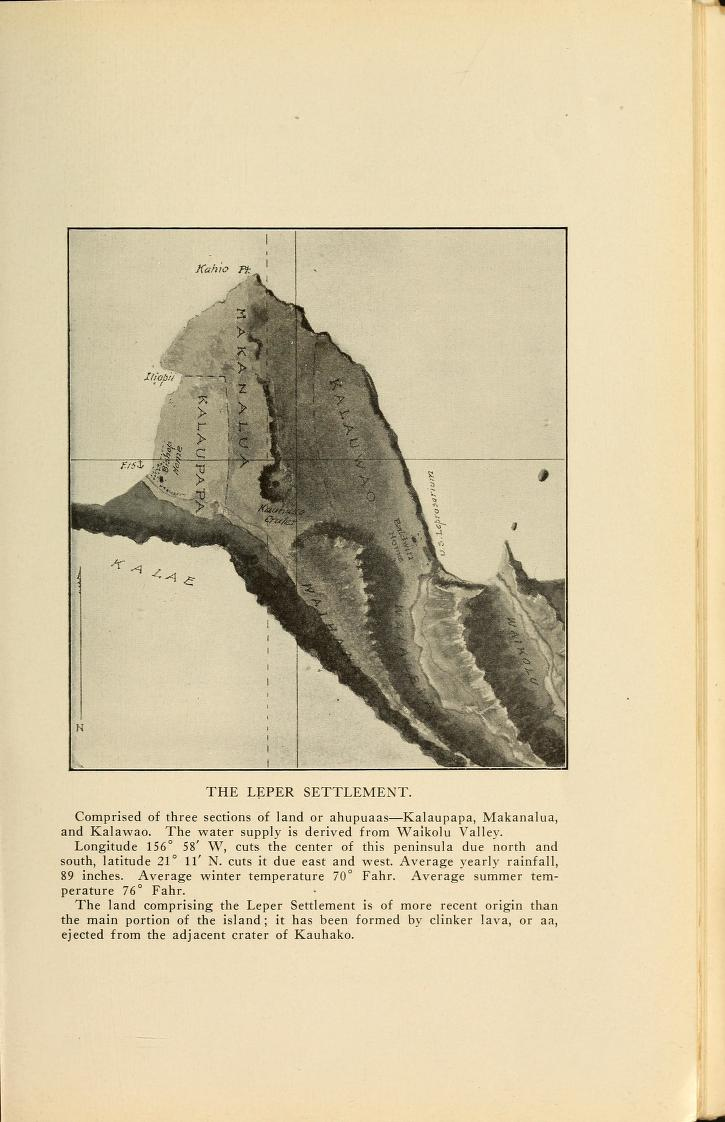
The Kalaupapa Leper Settlement

Kalaupapa (Hawaiian pronunciation: [kəlɐwˈpɐpə]) is a small unincorporated community and Hawaiian home land on the island of Molokaʻi, within Kalawao County in the U.S. state of Hawaii. In 1866, during the reign of Kamehameha V, the Hawaii legislature passed a law that resulted in the designation of Molokaʻi as the site for a leper colony, where patients who were seriously affected by leprosy (also known as Hansen's disease) could be quarantined, to prevent them from infecting others. At the time, the disease was little understood: it was believed to be highly contagious and was incurable until the advent of antibiotics. The communities where people with leprosy lived were under the administration of the Board of Health, which appointed superintendents on the island.

Kalaupapa is located on the Kalaupapa Peninsula at the base of sea cliffs that rise 2,000 feet (610 m) above the Pacific Ocean. In the 1870s a community to support the leper colony was established here. The legislature required people with severe cases to be quarantined on the island in the hope of preventing contagion. The area has been preserved as the Kalaupapa National Historical Park, which takes in the entire county.

Despite the declining population, the post office is still active, having a zip code of 96742.

== Leprosy settlement ==
The village is the site of a former settlement for people with leprosy. At its peak, about 1,200 men, women, and children were exiled to Kalaupapa Peninsula. The isolation law was enacted by King Kamehameha V and remained in effect until its repeal in 1969. Today, about four people who formerly had leprosy continue to live there. The colony is now included within Kalaupapa National Historical Park.

The original leper colony was first established in Kalawao in the east, opposite to the village corner of the peninsula. It was there where Father Damien settled in 1873. Later it was moved to the location of the current village, which was originally a Native Hawaiian fishing village. The settlement was also attended by Mother Marianne Cope and physician Arthur Albert St. Mouritz, among others. In 1893–1894, the Board of Health tried to remove the last fishing village inhabitants in order to expand the colony to encompass the entire Kalaupapa peninsula, including Kalawao.

Shortly before the end of mandatory isolation in 1969, the state legislature considered closing the facility entirely. Intervention by interested persons, such as entertainer Don Ho and TV newsman Don Picken, resulted in allowing the residents who chose to do so to remain there for life. The opponents to closure pointed out that, although there were no active cases of leprosy in the colony, many of the residents were physically scarred by the disease to an extent that would make their integration into mainstream society difficult if not impossible.

In total over the decades, more than 8,500 people living throughout the Hawaiian islands and diagnosed with leprosy were exiled to the colony by the Hawaiian government and legally declared dead.

== Geography ==
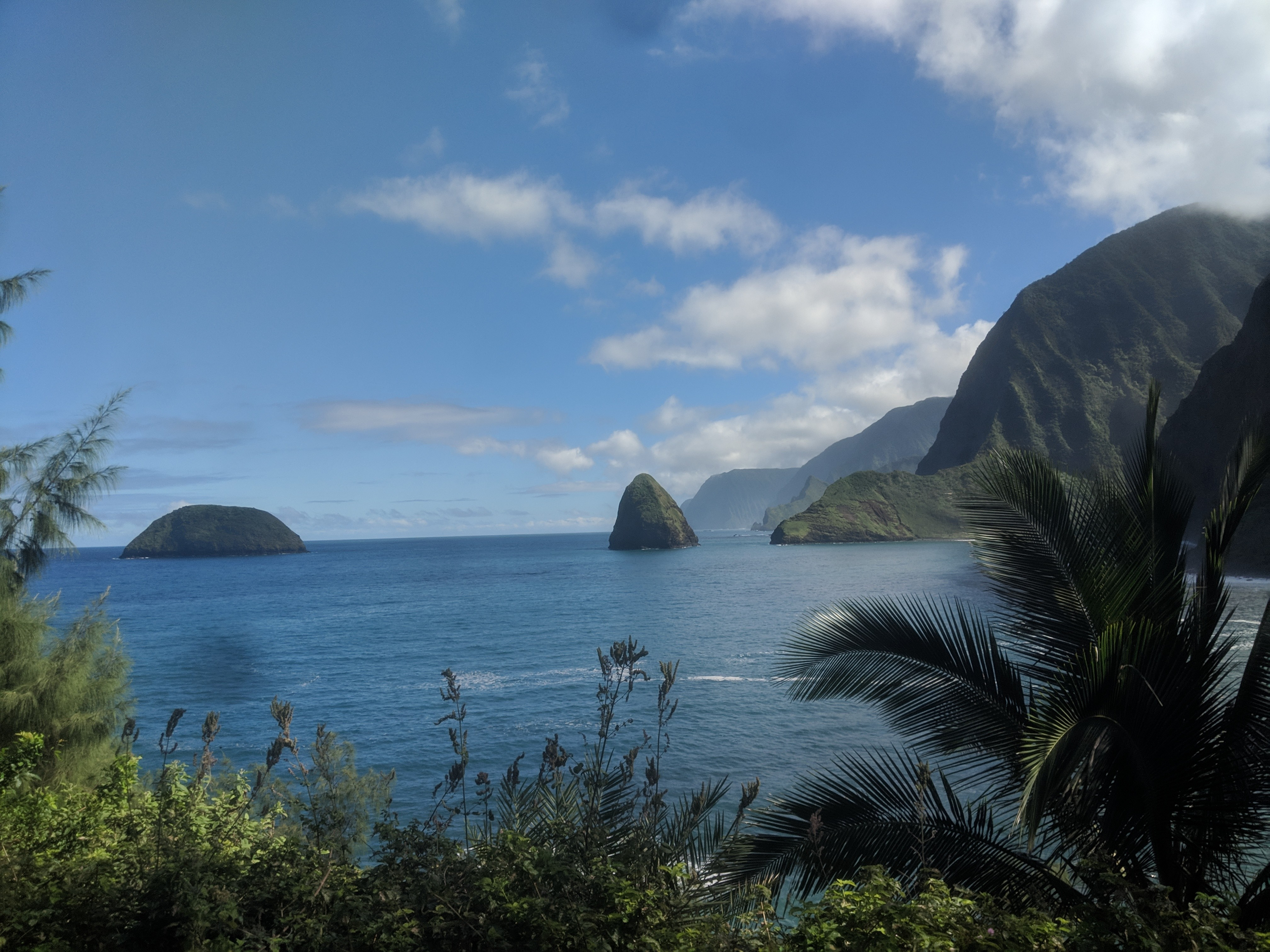
The offshore islands 'Ōkala, Mōkapu, and Huelo as seen from Kalaupapa

The Kalaupapa Peninsula remains one of the most remote locations in Hawaii due to unique volcanic and geologic activity over millions of years. Specifically, Molokai's famous sea cliffs, which reach up to three thousand feet above sea level and are among the tallest in the world, are most responsible for restricting access. Geologists thought that these cliffs were carved by wind and water erosion, but it is now believed that they formed after a third of the northern portion of the island collapsed into the sea. The offshore islands—'Ōkala, Mōkapu, and Huelo—support this theory, housing original plant species found on Molokai over two thousand years ago such as the rare native loulu palm. Mōkapu also hosts a remnant population of Emoia impar, the dark-bellied copper-striped skink, which was introduced to Hawaii more recently.

Around 230,000–300,000 years ago, an offshore shield volcano named Pu'u'uao erupted from the sea floor. The extremely hot and fast flowing pāhoehoe lava created a flat triangle of land which eventually cooled and connected to the main part of the island.

Among residents' most pressing challenges to survival were the scarcity and preservation of freshwater. An interest in the Kalaupapa coastal aquifer was captured by conflicting early accounts of visitors Jules Remy (1893) and Nakuino (1878) who described Kauhako Crater lake, a central geomorphic feature of the Kalaupapa peninsula as containing salt or freshwater, respectively. Kauhako lake, a freshwater resource during certain times in Kalaupapa's history, has largest depth-to-area ratio for any lake on earth. The lake has a weak tidal connection to the ocean and the Kalaupapa peninsula is underlain by only a thin freshwater lens.

== Access to the Peninsula ==
Until the construction of the Kalaupapa Airport in 1935, the only way into the peninsula was by boat or descending down the Kalaupapa Pali trail. Nowadays, accessing the peninsula via boat requires a special use permit. It is prohibited to come within 1,300 feet (400 m) of the Kalaupapa shoreline.

=== The Kalaupapa Trail ===
The 3.5-mile (5.6 km) Kalaupapa Pali Trail is the only land access into Kalaupapa. The trail consists of 26 switchbacks with a 2,000-foot (610 m) elevation change over the course of the trail. The National Park Service describes the hike as extremely strenuous due to the steep, uneven surfaces and varied trail conditions.

==== Trail access ====
Use of the trail is restricted since it lies within Kalawao County, which is administered by the Hawaii State Department of Health. For the general public, permits to enter Kalawao County can only be obtained by purchasing a tour from a tour operator. Historically, tour operators have offered both mule ride and hiking options. However, mule rides were interrupted in 2018 due to a lease dispute between the trailhead landowner and the tour operator. The trail was closed later that year due to a landslide, and before the trail reopened in 2020, all tours were suspended due to the COVID-19 pandemic. Twice-weekly tours resumed in July 2026.

==== Trail damage ====
The trail has been closed on multiple occasions due to rockfall and landslides. Historically, the second switchback of the trail has been the most prone to landslides and washouts. A bridge on that section has been damaged on 2 recent occasions, resulting in lengthy trail closures. A landslide caused bridge damage in 2010, and the trail was reopened 8 months later after a new aluminum bridge was installed. The new bridge was subsequently destroyed by a landslide in December 2018, and the trail was reopened in March 2020 after the installation of a bridge made of composite material.

== Kalaupapa National Historical Park ==
The Kalaupapa National Historical park, established December 22, 1980, is located on the location of two leper colonies that operated from 1866 to 1969. The park only allows 100 visitors a day, and each visitor must have a sponsor, either a resident or through one of the tour companies.

== See also ==
- Molokai: The Story of Father Damien
- Kalaupapa Peninsula and Molokai's Sea Cliffs. Aerial Interactive Images.
- Marie Helvin. The autobiography. Published in 2007 by Weidenfeld & Nicolson, London, ISBN 978-0-297-85311-4.
