= Kalawao, Hawaii =

Unincorporated community in Hawaii, US

Kalawao
- Unincorporated community
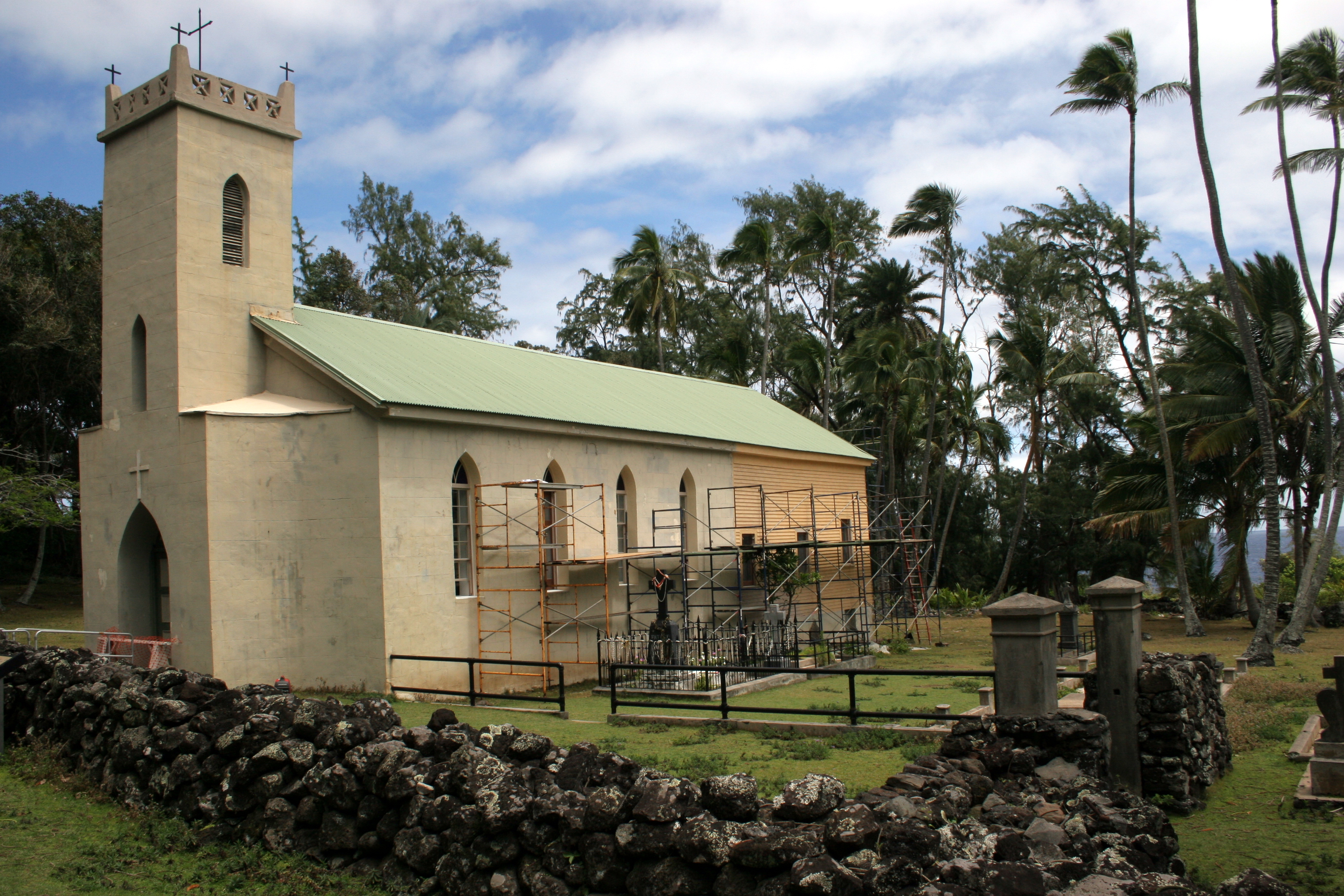
- St. Philomena Catholic Church, Kalawao

- Location within Hawaii
- Coordinates: 21°10′40″N 156°56′56″W
- Country: United States
- State: Hawaii
- County: Kalawao
- Elevation: 66 ft (20 m)

Population (2020)
  - Total: 0
- Time zone: UTC-10 (Hawaii-Aleutian)
- ZIP Code: 96742
- GNIS feature ID: 360095

Kalawao (Hawaiian pronunciation: [kələˈvɐo̯]) is a location on the eastern side of the Kalaupapa Peninsula of the island of Molokai, in Hawaii, which was the site of Hawaii's leper colony between 1866 and the early 20th century. Thousands of people in total came to the island to live in quarantine. It was one of two such settlements on Molokai, the other being Kalaupapa. Administratively Kalawao is part of Kalawao County. The placename means "mountain-side wild woods" in Hawaiian.

After the colony was established in 1866 by the legislature, with the intention of preventing the transmission of leprosy to others, a hospital, two churches and a number of homes were built here. Father Damien, a Belgian Catholic missionary, came to the island in 1873 to serve the lepers. In 1886 Brother Joseph Dutton went to the colony to aid the dying Father Damien. After Father Damien's death Dutton founded the Baldwin Home for Men and Boys in Kalawao. In the early 1900s the Hawaii Board of Health began relocating patients to Kalaupapa, the settlement on the western side of the peninsula. Its climate was warmer and drier, and access by sea was easier. A hospital complex was built at Kalawao to conduct research into Hansen's disease, and from 1909 to 1913 the US Leprosy Investigation Station was operated there. When that facility was closed, the settlement was abandoned in favor of Kalaupapa on the western side of the peninsula, about 3 miles away.

Kalawao, while on Molokai Island, is not part of Maui County. It is politically separated as its own county, the smallest one in the United States in area and second smallest in population with a population of 82 people.

The only buildings now remaining at Kalawao are the two churches, Siloama Congregationalist Church, established in 1866, and St. Philomena Catholic Church, associated with Father Damien. In 1889, after 16 years service in the colony, Father Damien died of leprosy and was buried in the churchyard. In January 1936, at the request of the Belgian government, Damien's body was repatriated to Belgium. After his beatification in June 1995, the remains of his right hand were returned to Hawaii, and re-interred in his original grave at Kalawao.

Near the two churches is Judd Park, a picnic site used by visitors, with dramatic views of the north shore of Molokai.
