= Father Damien =

Belgian Roman Catholic priest and saint (1840–1889)

Saint Damien of Molokai SSCC
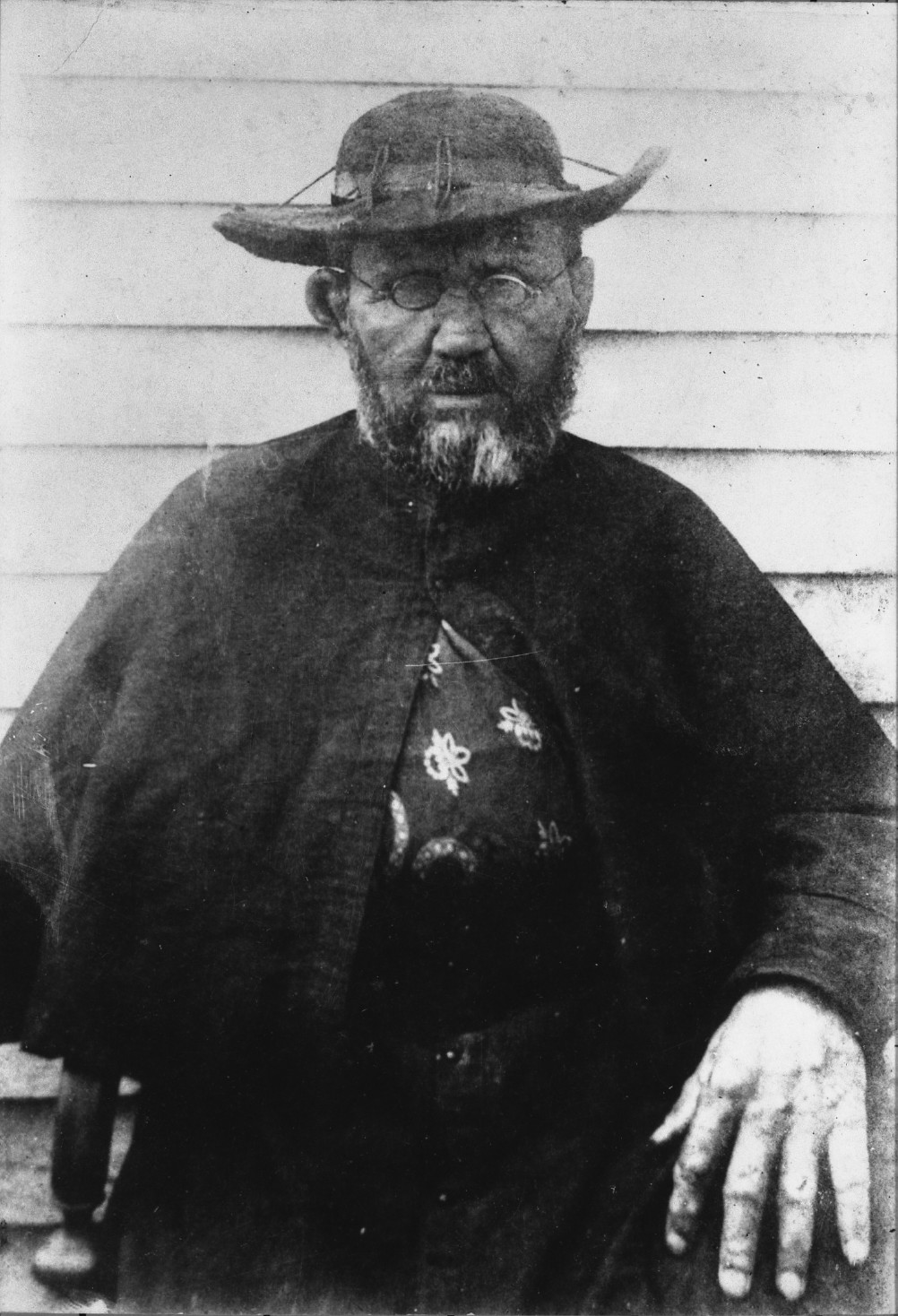
- Damien shortly before his death in 1889

Religious Priest and Missionary
- Born: 3 January 1840; Tremelo, Brabant, Kingdom of Belgium
- Died: 15 April 1889 (aged 49); Kalaupapa, Molokaʻi, Kingdom of Hawaii
- Venerated in: Roman Catholic Church, Eastern Catholic Churches, some churches of Anglican Communion; individual Lutheran Churches
- Beatified: 4 June 1995, Basilica of the Sacred Heart (Koekelberg), Brussels, by Pope John Paul II
- Canonized: 11 October 2009, Vatican City, by Pope Benedict XVI
- Major shrine: Leuven, Belgium (bodily relics); Molokaʻi, Hawaii (relics of his hand)
- Feast: 10 May (Catholic Church; obligatory in Hawaii, option in the rest of the United States);
- Patronage: People with Leprosy
- Signature of Damien

Damien De Veuster, popularly known as Father Damien or Saint Damien of Molokai (Dutch: Pater Damiaan or Heilige Damiaan van Molokai; born Jozef De Veuster; 3 January 1840 – 15 April 1889), was a Belgian Catholic priest in the Congregation of the Sacred Hearts of Jesus and Mary. He ministered to a leper colony in Molokaʻi, Kingdom of Hawaii, from 1873 until his death in 1889.

Damien taught the Catholic faith to the people of Hawaii. He also cared for patients of leprosy (lepers) and established leaders within the community to build houses, schools, roads, hospitals, and churches. He dressed residents' ulcers, built a reservoir, made coffins, dug graves, shared pipes, and ate poi with them, providing both medical and emotional support.

After 11 years caring for the physical, spiritual, and emotional needs of those in the leper colony, Damien contracted leprosy. He continued with his work until dying on 15 April 1889. He also had tuberculosis, which worsened his condition, but some believe the reason he volunteered in the first place was due to tuberculosis.

Damien has been described as a "martyr of charity". He is considered the spiritual patron for people with leprosy and outcasts. Father Damien Day, which takes place on 15 April, is a minor statewide holiday in Hawaii. Damien is the patron saint of the Diocese of Honolulu and of Hawaii.

Damien was canonized by Pope Benedict XVI on 11 October 2009. Libert H. Boeynaems, writing in the Catholic Encyclopedia, calls him "the Apostle of the Lepers." Damien's feast day is 10 May.

== Early life ==
Damien De Veuster was born Jozef ("Jef") De Veuster on 3 January 1840 in the village of Tremelo in Flemish Brabant in Belgium. He was the youngest of seven children and the fourth son of Joannes Franciscus ("Frans") De Veuster, a Flemish corn merchant, and his wife Anne-Catherine ("Cato") Wouters. Jozef's older sisters, Eugénie and Pauline, eventually joined religious orders. His older brother Auguste became a member of the Congregation of the Sacred Hearts of Jesus and Mary.

At age 13, Jozef was forced to leave school to work on the family farm. His father Frans later sent him to a college at Braine-le-Comte to prepare for a commercial profession. However, after attending a mission given by the Redemptorists in 1858, Jozef decided to pursue a religious vocation.

Damien entered the novitiate of the Fathers of the Sacred Heart of Jesus and Mary (Pipus Fathers) at Leuven and took the religious name of Damien, presumably after the first Saint Damien, a fourth-century physician and martyr. He was admitted to the religious profession on 7 October 1860.

The Pipus superiors deemed Damien as intelligent, but his education was too lacking for the priesthood. However, they changed their minds after he received extensive tutoring in Latin from his brother Auguste. While at the seminary, Damien prayed daily before a picture of St. Francis Xavier, patron of missionaries, asking to be sent on a mission. Three years later, when Auguste's health prevented him from traveling to Hawaiʻi as a missionary, the Pipus Order allowed Damien to take his place.

== Mission in Hawaii ==
=== Assignment to Big Island ===
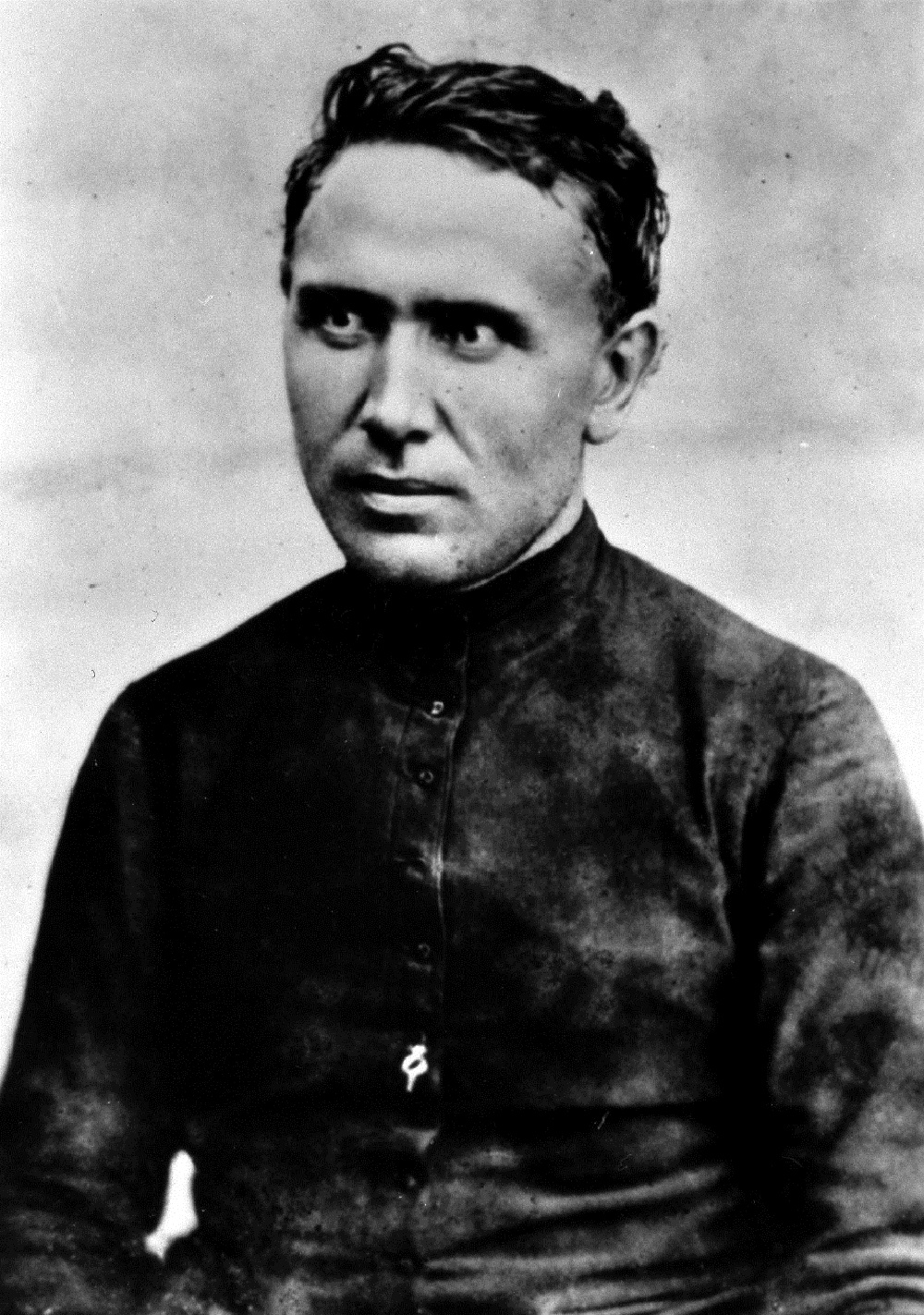
Damien (1878)

On 19 March 1864, Damien arrived at Honolulu Harbor on Oʻahu in the Hawaiian Islands. He was ordained into the priesthood on 21 May 1864, at what is now the Cathedral of Our Lady of Peace In a letter to his parents in Belgium, Damien wrote:

“Impossible to express how immensely happy a missionary is when he sees the new land that he must water with his sweat to gain uncivilized souls for Christ.”

In 1865, Damien was assigned to the Catholic Mission in North Kohala on the island of Hawaiʻi. During the next eight years, he served at missions in Puna, Kohala, and Hamakua.

=== Leprosy health crisis ===
During the middle of the 19th century, many native Hawaiians had contracted leprosy. It is believed that Chinese workers carried leprosy to Hawaii during the 1830s and 1840s. At that time, before the advent of antibiotics, leprosy was considered incurable. The contagion of leprosy was greatly exaggerated also.

In 1865, King Kamehameha V and the Hawaiian Legislature passed the "Act to Prevent the Spread of Leprosy." This law required the quarantining of people with leprosy. Those with the most serious cases were relocated to Kalawao, a new settlement of leprosy patients on the Kalaupapa peninsula, part of the sparsely-settled island of Molokaʻi. A steep mountain range separated Kalawao from the rest of the island. From 1866 through 1969, approximately 8,000 Hawaiians were sent to the Kalaupapa peninsula.

The Hawaiian government placed the Royal Board of Health in Honolulu in charge of Kalawao. The board initially provided the residents with food and other supplies, but no health care. The board planned for the residents to grow their own food and otherwise be self-sufficient. However, many residents did not plant crops because they expected an early release. In addition, the Hawaiian government reneged on its pledge to provided the residents with arable land. Contemporary and later accounts claimed that the residents were either too sick or too undisciplined to take care of their own needs.In 1870, Kalawao experienced several riots in protest over corruption by the superintendent installed by the Board of Health

=== Kalawao leprosy settlement ===
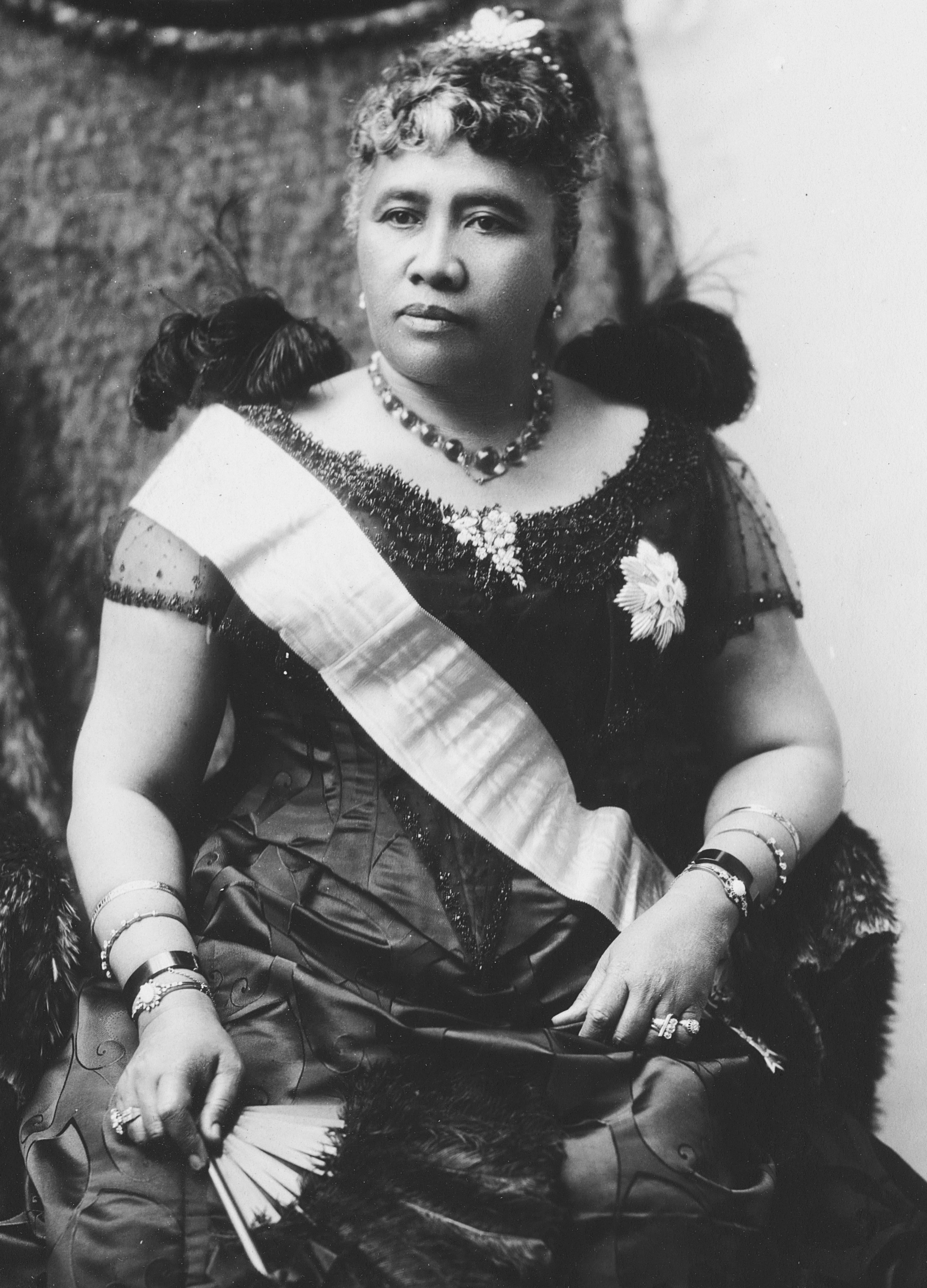
Queen Liliʻuokalani (1916)

Damien rectory

Bishop Louis Désiré Maigret, the vicar apostolic of Hawaii, wanted to assign a priest to Kalawao. However, believing that this was a high risk assignment due to the risk of contagion; Maigret did not want to force a priest to go there "in the name of obedience." After much prayer, Damien and three other priests volunteered to go to Kalawao. Maigret decided to rotate priest assignments in Kalawao every three months, with Damien selected as the first volunteer.

On 10 May 1873, Damien and Maigret arrived at Kalawao, which then had a population of 600 residents with leprosy. Maigret presented Damien to the community. Damien started working with the residents to build a church and establish the Parish of Saint Philomena. He conducted classes, painted houses, and helped with the construction of chapels, roads, hospitals, and churches. The residents established basic laws, working farms and schools.

He also dressed residents' ulcers, dined with them, shared tobacco pipes with them, and lived with them as equals .Damien told the residents that they were always precious in the eyes of God. In Late 1873, he wrote his brother Auguste, saying: "...I make myself a leper with the lepers to gain all to Jesus Christ."At Damien's request, and the request of the residents of Kalawao, Maigret allowed him to stay there permanently.

Damien had frequent quarrels with the Board of Health as well as his own superiors. He was described by contemporaries as headstrong and single-minded. Despite his commitment to the residents, Damien recorded this analysis of Hawaiians:

...the great majority, if not the total number of all pure natives, have the syphilitic blood very well developed in there system. The poisonous root has shot into different ramifications and in some instances, in the manner which we call leprosy...The Hawaiians in general are reputed to be very licentious...and they often become diseased.

In 1877, Crown Princess Lydia Liliʻuokalani visited Kalawao during a trip to Molokai. Highly impressed with Damien's work, she later persuaded her brother, King David Kalākaua, to honor him as a knight commander of the Royal Order of Kalākaua.

In 1878, after the death of the current superintendent of Kalawao, who was half-Hawaiian, the Board of Health appointed Damien as his successor. The residents then started complaining to the board about poor conditions at their hospital and asked that Damien be replaced by William Sumners, a man of mixed European and Hawaiian heritage. At one point, Damien ordered the arrest and deportation of a Protestant minister to Honolulu, claiming that he was fomenting rebellion against the Board of Health. Later that year, the Board replaced Damien with Sumners as superintendent.In 1883, Marianne Cope, founder of the Sisters of St. Francis of Syracuse, arrived in Kalawao with several sisters to take charge of its hospital.

Damien's work was reported to Europeans and Americans in order to raise funds for the Kalawao mission. Damien became internationally known in the United States and Europe. American Protestants raised large sums of money for his work. The Church of England sent food, medicine, clothing, and supplies to Kalawao.

=== Leprosy sufferer ===
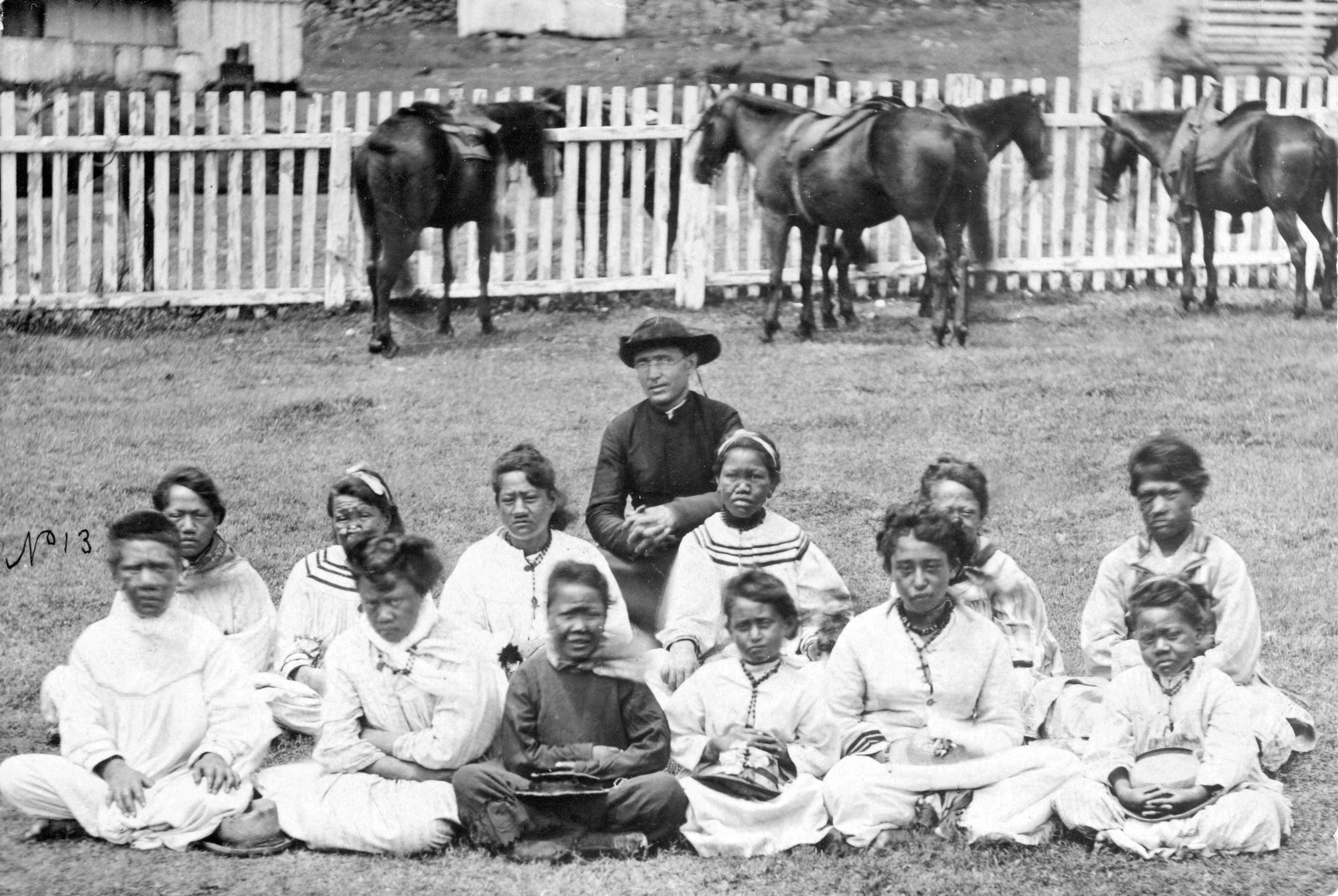
Damien with the Kalawao Girls Choir (circa 1870s)

In December 1884, while he was preparing to bathe, Damien inadvertently put his foot into scalding water, causing his skin to blister. Feeling no pain, Damien realized that he had contracted leprosy. Despite his illness, Damien continued to work.

In 1885, Masanao Goto, a Japanese leprologist, came to Honolulu and treated Damien. Goto believed that leprosy was caused by a diminution of the blood. His treatment consisted of nourishing foods, moderate exercise, frequent friction to the benumbed body parts, special ointments, and medical baths. The Goto treatments relieved some of Damien's symptoms and became very popular with the leprosy patients at Kalawao. Damien said that he only wanted treatment from Goto, who became a good friend.

Joseph Dutton, an American religious brother, came to the colony in 1886 to supervise the construction and maintenance of the community's buildings. In 1888, the Belgian priest Louis Lambert Conrady arrived on the island; he was to assume Damien's pastoral duties.James Sinnett, an American layperson, also arrived in Kalaweo in 1888 and became Damien's nurse.

=== Death ===
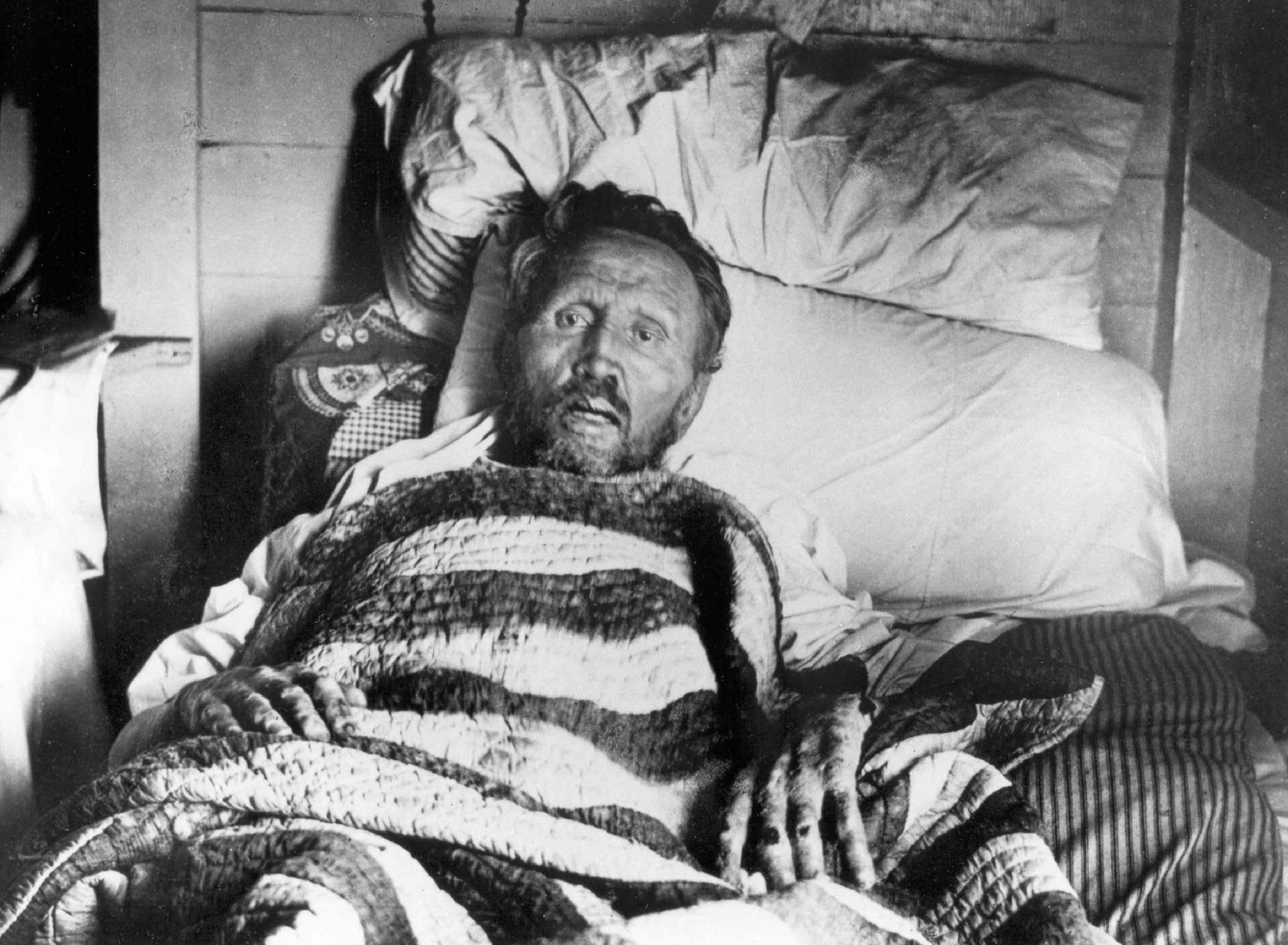
Damien on his deathbed (1889)

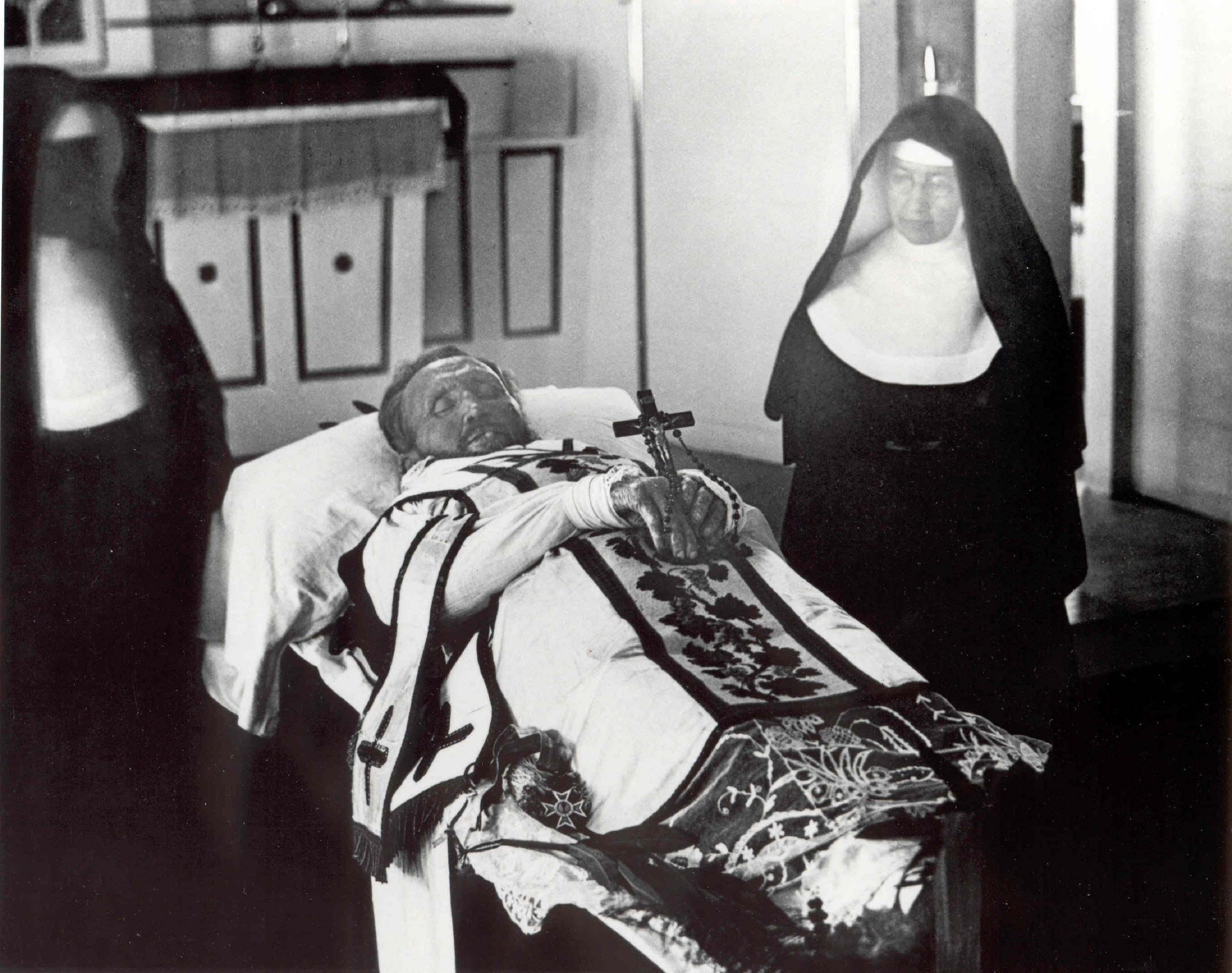
Marianne Cope and Leopoldina Burns standing beside Damien's funeral bier (image reversed) (1889)

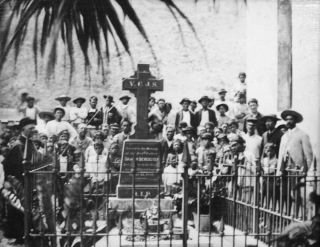
Kalawao residents gathered around Damien's grave (1889)

By the beginning of 1889, Damien had an arm in a sling and a foot in bandages, with his leg dragging. He was bedridden on 23 March 1889, and on 30 March, he made a general confession. Damien died of leprosy at Kalawao on 15 April 1889, at age 49.

The next day, Damien's funeral mass was celebrated at St. Philomena's Church in Kalawao. The entire settlement then followed the funeral cortège to the parish cemetery. Damien was buried under the same pandanus tree where he first slept upon his arrival on Molokaʻi.

== Commentary after his death ==
Damien had become internationally known before his death because he was seen as a symbolic Christian figure who spent his life caring for the afflicted natives. His superiors thought that Damien lacked education and finesse, but they considered him to be "an earnest peasant hard at work in his own way for God." News of his death was quickly carried across the globe by the modern communications of the time, by steamship to Honolulu and California, telegraph to the East Coast of the United States, and cable to England, reaching London on the 11th of May. Following an outpouring of praise for his work, other voices began to be heard in Hawaiʻi.

=== Hyde and Stevenson letters ===
In August 1889, Reverend Charles McEwen Hyde, a Presbyterian minister in Honolulu, wrote about Damien to H. B. Gage, a pastor in San Francisco, California. In his letter, Hyde called Damien as "a coarse, dirty man," and claimed that he had contracted leprosy through sexual relations with women. Hyde also claimed that Damien received credit for reforms at Kalaupapa that were implemented by the Royal Board of Health. Without consulting Hyde, Gage published the letter in a San Francisco newspaper, generating controversy on the American mainland and in Hawaiʻi.

In late 1889, the Scottish author Robert Louis Stevenson and his family arrived in Hawaii. Suffering from tuberculosis, he had come to Hawaii in hopes of improving his health. Moved by Damien's story, Stevenson spent seven days on Molokaʻi to learn more about him. While there, Stevenson spoke with many residents about Damien. In February 1890, Stevenson published an open letter to Hyde, defending Damien. Stevenson's letter became the most famous account of Damien, portraying him as a dedicated European rescuing the colony residents. Stevenson had this comment for Hyde:

If that world at all remember you, on the day when Damien of Molokai shall be named a Saint, it will be in virtue of one work: your letter to the Reverend H. B. Gage.

Stevenson referred to his journal entries in his letter:

...I have set down these private passages, as you perceive, without correction; thanks to you, the public has them in their bluntness. They are almost a list of the man's faults, for it is rather these that I was seeking: with his virtues, with the heroic profile of his life, I and the world were already sufficiently acquainted. I was besides a little suspicious of Catholic testimony, in no ill sense, but merely because Damien's admirers and disciples were the least likely to be critical. I know you will be more suspicious still, and the facts set down above were one and all collected from the lips of Protestants who had opposed the father in his life. Yet I am strangely deceived, or they build up the image of a man, with all his weakness, essentially heroic, and alive with rugged honesty, generosity, and mirth.

=== Gandhi comments ===
The Indian activist Mahatma Gandhi said that Damien's work had inspired his social campaigns in British India. Gandhi was quoted in T.N. Jagadisan's 1965 publication Mahatma Gandhi Answers the Challenge of Leprosy:

The political and journalistic world can boast of very few heroes who compare with Father Damien of Molokai. The Catholic Church, on the contrary, counts by the thousands those who, after the example of Fr. Damien, have devoted themselves to the victims of leprosy. It is worthwhile to look for the sources of such heroism.

In 1997, the scholar Pennie Moblo wrote that the early historical reports of Damien's ministry almost completely discounted the roles of the Kalawao residents in building their community. Furthermore, these reports revealed biases toward European and American figures in their descriptions.

== Veneration ==
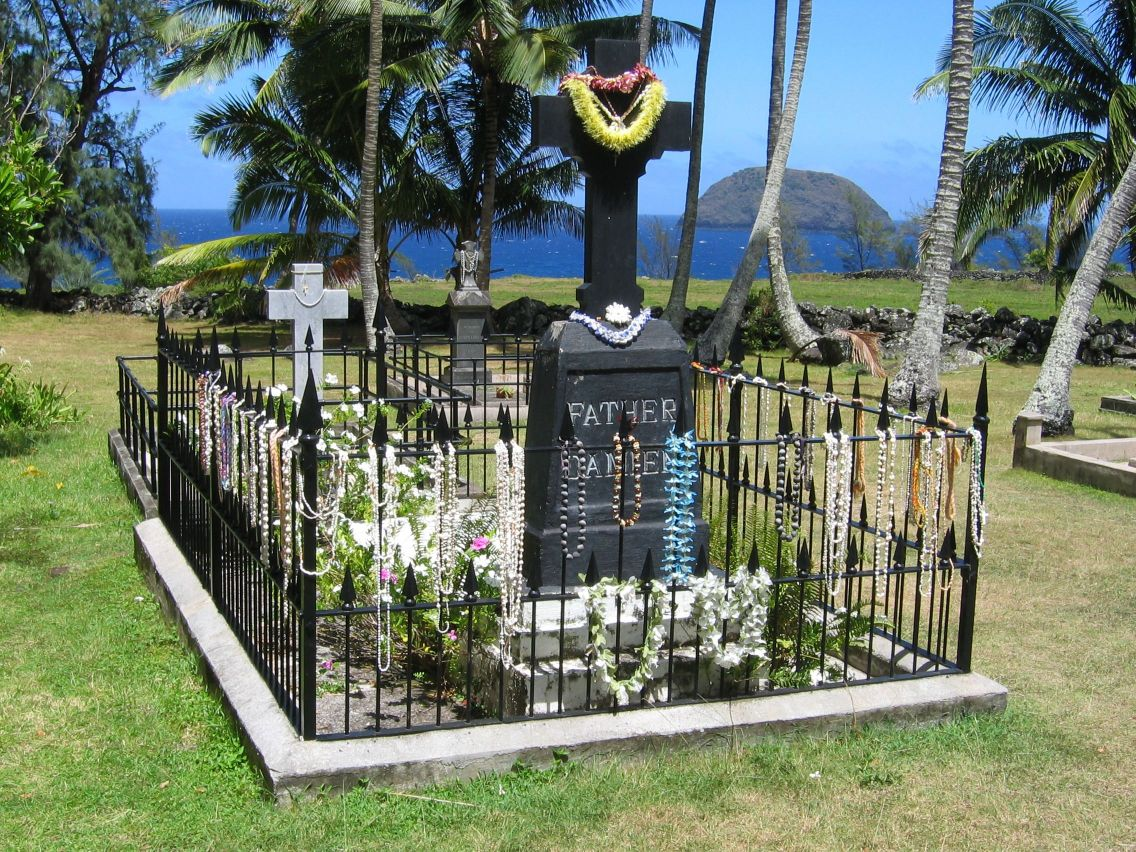
Original Damien gravesite, St. Philomena Church, Kalawao, Kalaupapa Peninsula, Molokaʻi, Hawaii (21°10′37″N 156°56′53.3″W)

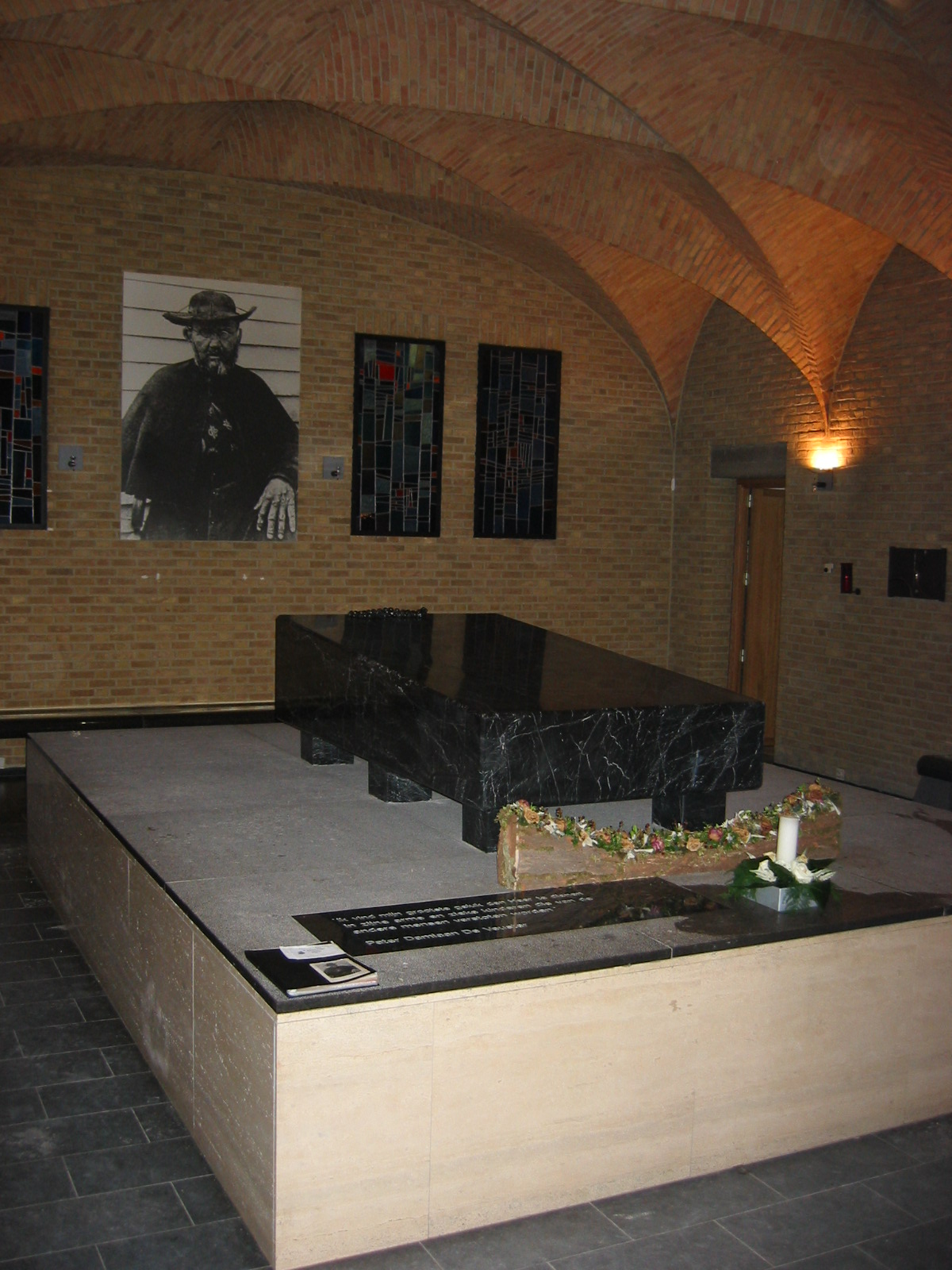
Damien tomb, Church of the Congregation of the Sacred Heart crypt in Leuven, Belgium (50°52′33.4″N 004°41′54.1″E)

=== Beatification ===
In 1895, Sister Simplicia Hue was dying in France of an untreatable intestinal illness. She prayed novena to Damien, asking for his intercession to cure her. She said that the pain and symptoms of the illness disappeared overnight. The Archdiocese of Malines in Belgium introduced in 1937 the cause for Damien's canonization.In 1977, Pope Paul VI declared Damien to be venerable.

In 1997, Audrey Toguchi, a Hawaiian woman, was diagnosed with liposarcoma. She underwent surgery in 1998 and a tumor was removed, but the cancer metastasized to her lungs. Her physician, Dr. Walter Chang, told her, "Nobody has ever survived this cancer. It's going to take you."After praying for Damien's intercession at his gravesite on Molokaʻi, her cancer went into remission. There was no medical explanation for it. Toguchi was still alive in 2016.

In December 1999, Jorge Medina Estévez, prefect of the Congregation for Divine Worship and the Discipline of the Sacraments, confirmed the November 1999 decision of the United States Conference of Catholic Bishops to include Damien in the national liturgical calendar with the rank of an optional memorial.

In April 2008, the Vatican accepted the Hue and Toguchi cases as genuine miracles. In June 2008, the Congregation for the Causes of Saints recommended the beatification of Damien. Their decree was approved by Pope Benedict XVI and promulgated by Cardinal José Saraiva Martins on 3 July 2008. The Damien beatification ceremony was held in Rome,with celebrations in Belgium and Hawaii. After his beatification, the remains of Damien's right hand were re-interred in his original grave on Molokaʻi.

=== Canonization ===
On 21 February 2009, the Vatican announced that Damien would be canonized.The canonization ceremony took place in Rome on 11 October 2009. It was attended by King Albert II and Queen Paola of Belgium, along with Belgian Prime Minister Herman Van Rompuy.

In Washington, D.C., President Barack Obama affirmed his deep admiration for Damien, saying that he gave voice to the voiceless and dignity to the sick. After Damien's beatification in June 1995, the remains of his right hand were returned to Hawaii and re-interred in his original grave on Molokaʻi.

Damien's feast day is celebrated on 10 May. In Hawaii, it is celebrated on the day he died, 15 April.

== Arts and media ==
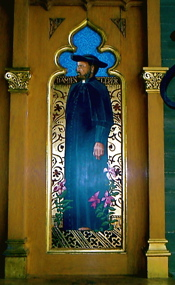
Damien reredos, St. Thomas the Apostle Episcopal Church, Los Angeles, California (2006)

=== Films ===
- The Great Heart (1938), a short biographical film by Director David Miller, released by MGM.
- Molokai (1959), a Spanish film directed by Luis Lucia, with Javier Escrivá, Roberto Camardiel, and Gérard Tichy.
- Molokai: The Story of Damien (1999) a Belgian film produced by Tharsi Vanhuysse and directed by Paul Cox, with David Wenham as Damien.
- The Soul of Kalaupapa: Voices of Exile (2011) a documentary film featuring Interviews with former residents of Kalaupapa. It focuses on the efforts of Damien and Jonatana Napela, a Hawaiian Mormon convert who worked with persons with leprosy in Kalaupapa

=== Television ===
- The Leper Priest (1980), an American television program with Ken Howard as Damien
- Simple Courage (1992) a documentary television program by Stephanie J. Castillo. It explores Damien and his work, comparing the stigma of persons with leprosy to those with HIV/AIDS. Simple Courage received an Emmy Award in 1993.

=== Literature ===
- Damien the Leper (1937), a biography by John Farrow. In 1939, RKO Pictures purchased the book for a feature film titled Damien, but the film was never produced.
- Father Damien (1938), a poetic dramatization by Edward Snelson.
- Damien (1978). a one-person play by Aldyth Morris. An adaptation was broadcast on the PBS network in the United States. It won a Peabody Award.
- God Made Us Monsters (2016), a novel by William Neary that explores Damien's rise to sainthood.

=== Monuments and statues ===
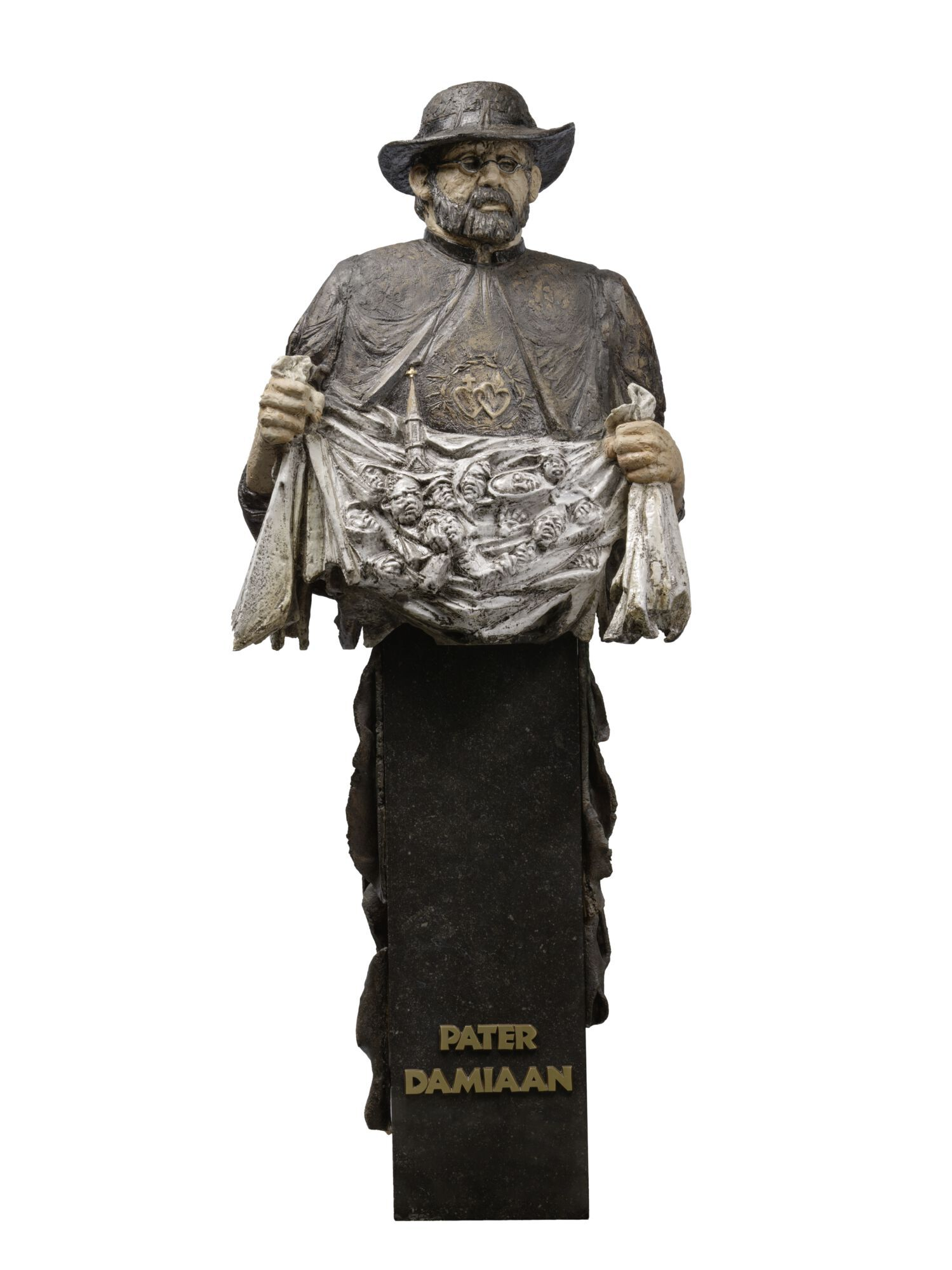
Damien statue, Saint Bavo's Cathedral, Ghent, Belgium (2024)

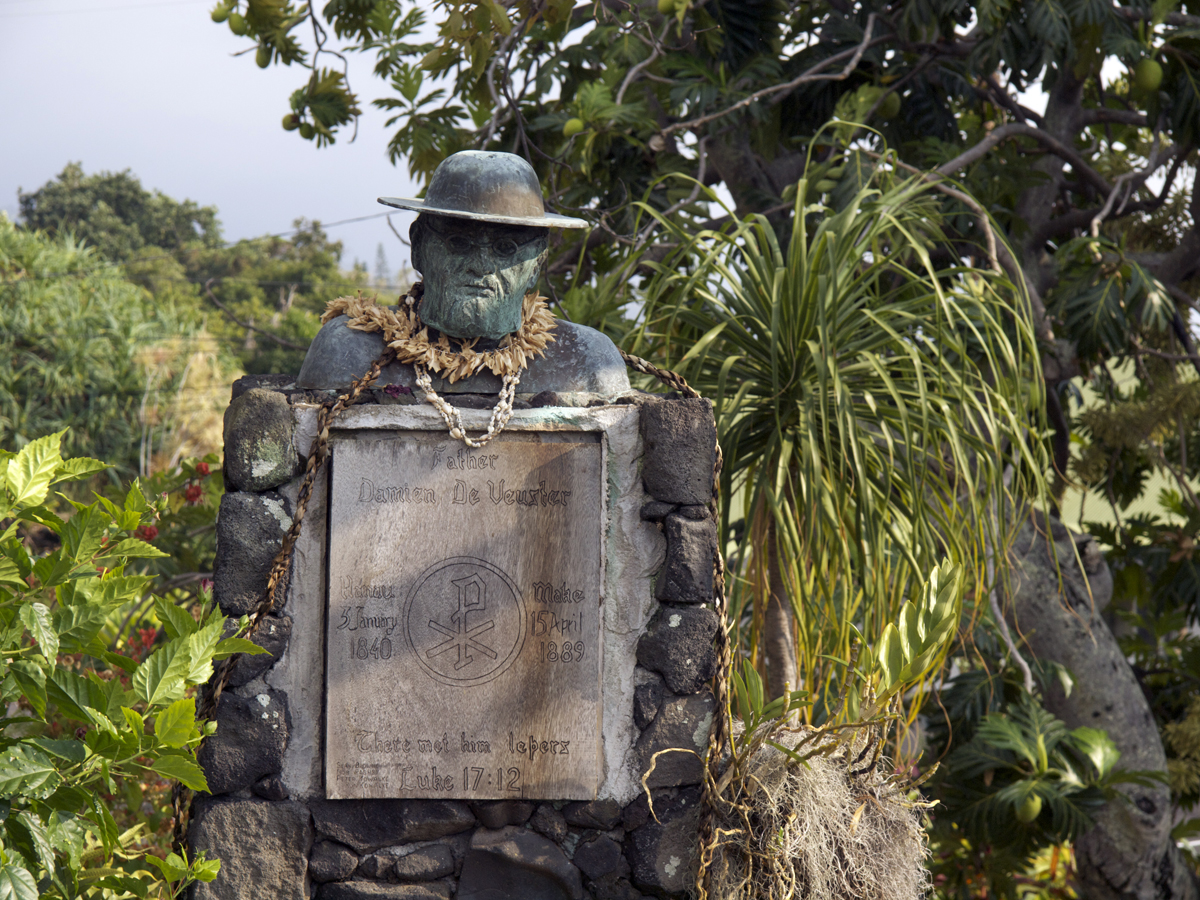
Damien statue, St. Benedict's Catholic Church, Honaunau, Hawaii (2012)

- Damien Statue at the Hawaii State Capitol Building in Honolulu
- A replica statue of the one in Honolulu, located in the National Statuary Hall Collection in the United States Capitol in Washington, D.C.
- Statues in memory of Damien can be found in many Belgian cathedrals, such as the Tournai Cathedral, St Bavo's Cathedral, Ghent, and St Martin's Cathedral, Ypres.
- A monument stands in front of St. Benedict's Catholic Church in Honaunau (Hawaii) and is often decorated with Leis.

== Legacy and honors ==
In 1936, at the request of King Leopold III of Belgium and the Belgian government, Damien's body was returned to Belgium. He was re-interred in Leuven. After Damien's beatification in 1995, the remains of his right hand were returned to Hawaii and re-interred in his original grave on Molokaʻi.

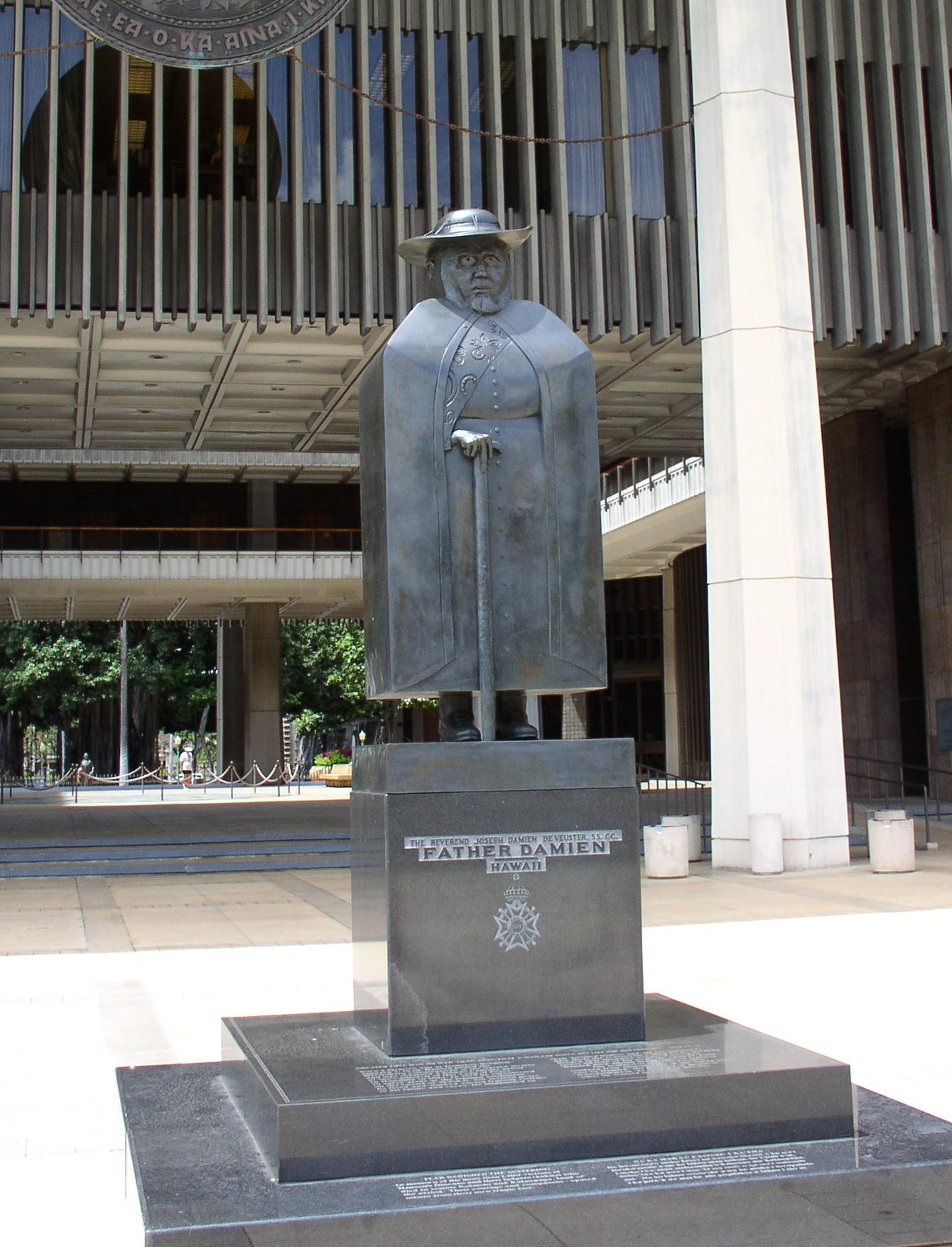
Damien statue, Hawaii State Capitol Building, Honolulu (2006)

In 2005, Damien was honored with the title of De Grootste Belg, chosen as "The Greatest Belgian" throughout that country's history, in polling conducted by the Flemish public broadcasting service, VRT. He ranked third on Le plus grand Belge ("The Greatest Belgian") in a poll by the French-speaking public channel RTBF.

With his canonization highlighting his ministry to persons with leprosy, Damien's work has been cited as an example of how society should minister to HIV/AIDS patients.

=== Charities ===
- Damien the Leper Society, Pensacola, Florida, dedicated to helping sufferers from leprosy
- Damien House, Northern Ireland, a facility for the homeless and individuals with addictions.
- Troy Damien Center, Troy, New York – hospitality center for persons with HIV/AIDS and other serious illness
- Albany Damien Center, Albany, New York – residence for the homeless and those suffering from AIDS/HIV
- Damien Center, Indianapolis, Indiana – center for the care of those with HIV/AIDS

=== Facilities ===
- Damien Museum, Tremelo, Belgium
- St Damien of Molokai Chapel, St. Thomas the Apostle Church, Los Angeles, California

=== Schools ===
- Damien High School, La Verne, California
- St. Damien School, Calgary, Alberta
- St. Damien School, Honolulu
- St Damien’s Catholic Primary School, Dawesville, Western Australia

=== Parishes and churches ===
- St. Damien Catholic Church, Edmond, Oklahoma
- St. Damien Parish, Ocean City, New Jersey
- St. Damien of Molokai Catholic Parish, Pontiac, Michigan
- Saint Damien of Molokai, Monongahela, Monongahela, Pennsylvania

== See also ==
- Kalaupapa National Historical Park
- American Catholic Servants of God, Venerables, Beatified, and Saints
- List of American saints and beatified people
- Father Damien, patron saint archive
- Damiano Giulio Guzzetti

== Sources ==
- Daws, Gavan (1984). Holy Man: Father Damien of Molokai. Honolulu: University of Hawai'i Press. ISBN 0-8248-0920-3.
- Eynikel, Hilde (1999). Molokai: the Story of Father Damien. Staten Island: Alba House. ISBN 0-8189-0872-6.
- Stewart, Richard (2000). Leper Priest of Moloka'i. Honolulu: University of Hawai'i Press. ISBN 0-8248-2322-2.
