= Our Lady of Peace =

Title of Mary

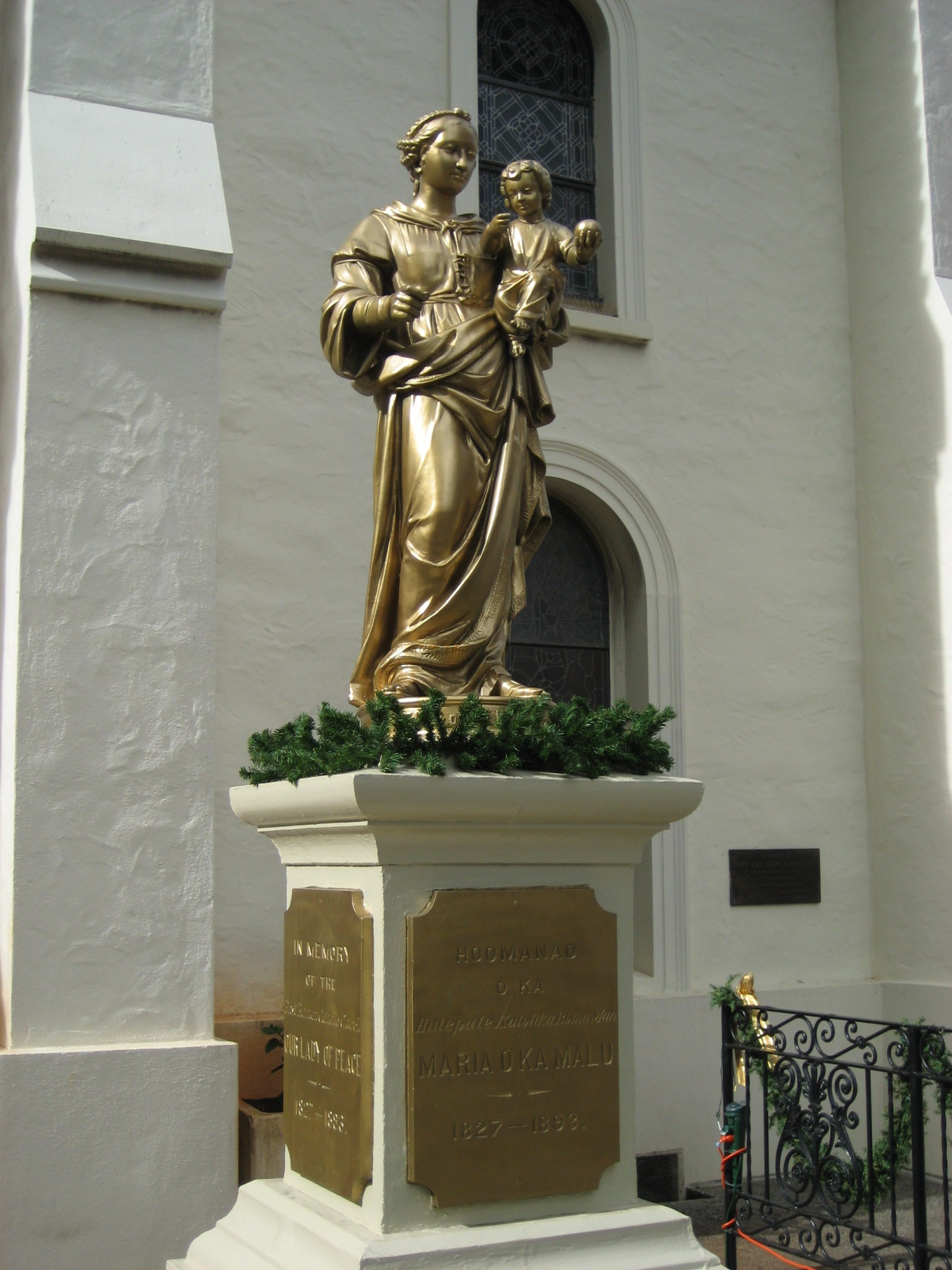
- A statue of Our Lady of Peace stands in the courtyard of the Cathedral of Our Lady of Peace in Honolulu, Hawaii.

Mother of Peace, Queen of Peace
- Venerated in: Roman Catholic Church
- Major shrine: Cathedral Basilica of Our Lady of Peace, Hawaii
- Feast: 9 July, January 24
- Attributes: Blessed Virgin Mary, Infant Jesus, olive branch, dove
- Patronage: Peace, Congregation of the Sacred Hearts of Jesus and Mary, El Salvador, Maine, Hawaii

Our Lady of Peace, Mother of Peace, Queen of Peace or Our Lady Queen of Peace is a title of the Blessed Virgin Mary in the Roman Catholic Church. She is represented in art holding a dove and an olive branch, symbols of peace. Her official memorial in the General Roman Calendar is on July 9 in the universal Church except for some churches in the United States, where it is kept on January 24.

== History ==
In 1482, Pope Sixtus IV commissioned the construction of the church of Santa Maria della Pace on the foundations of the old Sant'Andrea de Aquarizariis.

There are many papal encyclicals asking Mary to intercede for peace. During the troubled years of World War I, Pope Benedict XV added Our Lady of Peace to the Litany of Loreto.

=== France ===
The traditional story holds that in the early 1500s in France, a certain Jean de Joyeuse presented the statue as a wedding gift to his young bride, Françoise e Voisins. The statue was known as the "Virgin of Joyeuse", and became a cherished family heirloom.

Around the year 1588, Jean's grandson, Henri Joyeuse, joined the Capuchin Franciscans in Paris and brought the statue with him, where it remained for the next 200 years. With the olive branch in her hand and the Prince of Peace on her arm, the statue was called Notre Dame de Paix (Our Lady of Peace). In 1657 the Capuchin community erected a larger chapel to accommodate the growing number of faithful who sought her intercession. On July 9 that year, before a large crowd which included King Louis XIV, the papal nuncio to France blessed and solemnly enthroned the Virgin's statue. Pope Alexander VII would later designate this date for the Capuchin community to celebrate the feast of Our Lady of Peace.

During the French Revolution, which erupted in 1789, the Capuchins were driven from their monastery. They took the image with them to prevent its destruction by the ransacking rebels. When peace was restored in the land, the statue was brought out of hiding and entrusted to Peter Coudrin, a priest in Paris. In 1800, Coudrin and Henriette Aymer de Chevalerie became co-founders of a community of sisters, brothers and priests – the Congregation of the Sacred Hearts of Jesus and Mary and the Perpetual Adoration of the Blessed Sacrament. The members were also known more simply as the Picpus Fathers or Sacred Hearts religious. Coudrin gave the statue to Mother Aymer, who enshrined it in a convent chapel in the Picpus district of Paris on May 6, 1806.

Excluding its pedestal, the figure of dark hardwood is 11 inches tall, and is fashioned in the Renaissance style of the period. Mary is depicted as a dignified matron, with the Christ Child on her left arm and an olive branch in her right hand.

=== Canada ===
==== Niagara Falls ====
The earliest Catholic settlers in this area had no local services and had to travel to Kingston for their Easter Communion. By 1826, Catholic families were numerous enough to support their own pastor; in 1827, Father James Campion, whose parish extended from Toronto to Windsor, was made pastor. He was succeeded by Father Edward Gordon, who erected churches in a number of communities in his parish, including Our Lady of Peace at Falls View. This church, originally known as St. Edward's Church, was completed on June 13, 1837, and was dedicated to St. Edward, the patron saint of priests. In 1858, the Catholic community in the area had grown so large that St. Edward's was declared a separate parish, and Father Victor Juhel was appointed its first pastor. A frame addition was added to the west end of the structure in 1860, the same year that Archbishop John Joseph Lynch of Toronto purchased 200 acres of land surrounding the church. Included in that purchase was the land which he would deed to the Loretto Nuns for construction of the Loretto Academy.

On March 1st, 1861, Pope Pius IX decreed the church a place of pilgrimage, and its name was changed from St. Edward's to Our Lady of Peace. In 1875, the Shrine of Our Lady of Peace was placed under the care of the Carmelite Fathers, who were erecting a monastery on an adjacent property. On July 16, 1876, Archbishop Lynch of the Toronto Diocese led a pilgrimage to Our Lady of Peace, and laid the cornerstone for the monastery of Mount Carmel. Stained glass windows, new altars, statues and pews were installed in the church, and a porch was added to the exterior in 1913. In 1950, the church purchased property on Barker Street and converted the Burns Knife Factory (formerly Spence's Carriage Works) and a house beside it, into Mariann Hall, which served as a social activity centre for the church. Mariann Hall acted as a mission church while Our Lady of Peace was renovated and refurbished in 1958. A new Parish Hall opened in 1966, adjacent to the church, on the former site of the Mount Carmel College barn. Our Lady of Peace Church celebrated its sesquicentennial (150th) anniversary in 1987.

=== El Salvador ===
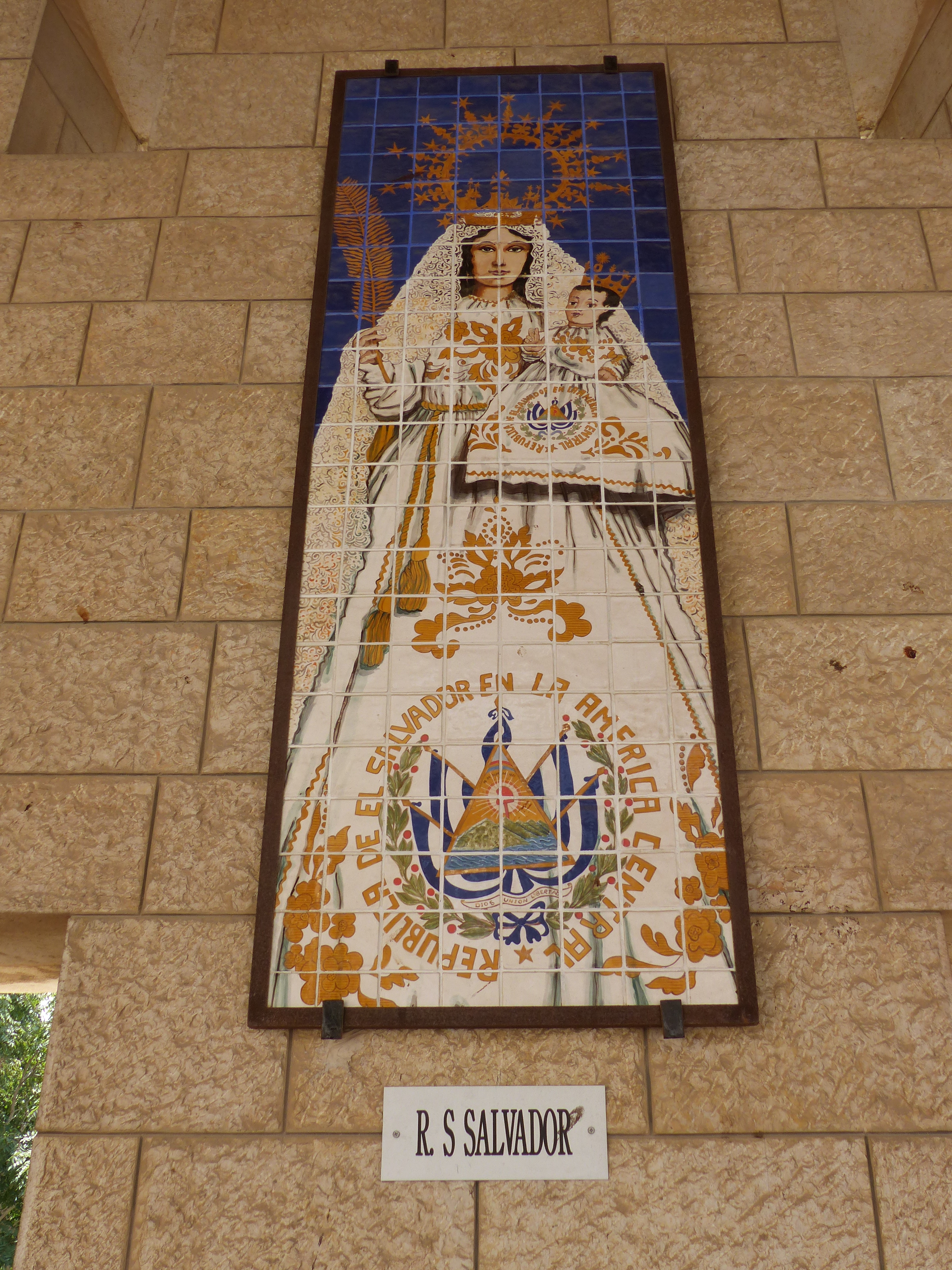
An azulejo of the Virgin Queen of Peace from El Salvador in the Basilica of the Annunciation in Nazareth, Israel.

Tradition holds that in 1682 merchants found an abandoned box on the shore of Mar del Sur in El Salvador. Unable to open it, they tied the box on the back of a donkey and departed to inform the local authorities of their find. When they were passing the parish church, now a cathedral, the donkey laid on the ground. They were then able to open the box and were surprised that it contained an image of Our Lady holding the Christ Child. It is said that a bloody conflict was being fought among inhabitants of the region; when they heard of the discovery they put down their weapons and immediately ceased fighting. This is why the image was given the title of Our Lady of Peace, whose liturgical celebration is November 21 in memory of its arrival in San Miguel.

Óscar Romero, a renowned Salvadoran saint and Bishop, promoted devotion to Our Lady of Peace.

The statue is a dressed wooden carving, with the national shield of El Salvador embroidered on the front of the image's white robe. Our Lady holds a golden palm leaf in memory of the eruption of the Chaparrastique volcano, which threatened to destroy the city with burning lava. The frightened dwellers of San Miguel brought out the statue of Our Lady of Peace to the principal door of the cathedral, and immediately the flow of the lava changed direction to travel away from the city.

Pope Benedict XV authorized the canonical coronation of the image, which occurred on November 21, 1921.

=== United States ===
In Hawaii, the title is translated as Malia O Ka Malu. While most of the world celebrates Our Lady of Peace on July 9, the United States celebrates her on January 24. This coincides with the erection of the Diocese of Honolulu in 1941 by Pope Pius XII.

== Patronage ==
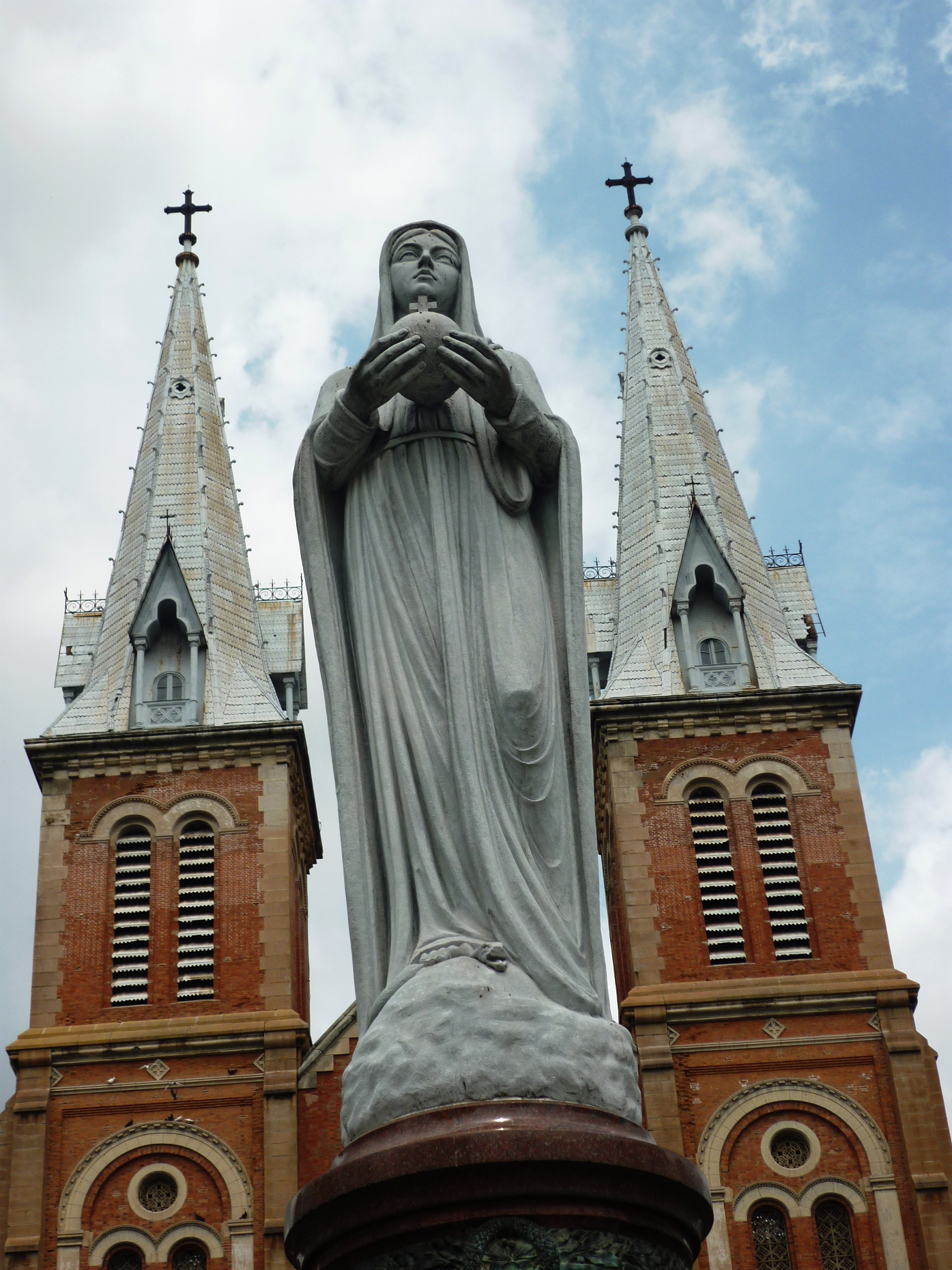
Statue of Our Lady of Peace in front of Saigon Notre-Dame Basilica

Our Lady of Peace is the patroness of the Congregation of the Sacred Hearts of Jesus and Mary, founded by Peter Coudrin in Paris during the French Revolution. When the Congregation of the Sacred Hearts of Jesus and Mary established the Catholic Church in Hawaii, they consecrated the Hawaiian Islands under the protection of Our Lady of Peace. They erected the first Roman Catholic church in Hawaii to her. Today, the Cathedral of Our Lady of Peace in Honolulu is the oldest Roman Catholic cathedral in continuous use in the United States.

There are three famous statues of Our Lady of Peace located in Paris and Honolulu. The original is a wooden carving located at a convent of the Congregation of the Sacred Hearts of Jesus and Mary in France. A larger replica in bronze was hoisted above the altar and sanctuary at the Cathedral of Our Lady of Peace, while a third stands on a pedestal outside the cathedral.

The original statue of Our Lady of Peace was ceremonially crowned on July 9, 1906, by the Archbishop of Paris in the name of Pope Pius X. Every July 9 since then, the Congregation of the Sacred Hearts of Jesus and Mary have celebrated the Feast of Our Lady of Peace.

=== Other shrines ===
Pope John Paul II consecrated and dedicated the Basilica of Our Lady of Peace of Yamoussoukro in Côte d'Ivoire to Our Lady of Peace. It is the largest place of worship in Africa. Elsewhere throughout the world, there are parish churches named in honor of Our Lady of Peace in various forms, such as the parish of Our Lady of Peace in Brooklyn.

The EDSA Shrine in Metro Manila, the Philippines, is also dedicated to Our Lady of Peace. Located along EDSA, it commemorates the alleged role of the Virgin in the People Power Revolution of February 1986 that ended President Ferdinand Marcos' 21-year dictatorship. In the “Rosary miracle,” Mary is said to have shrouded the more than one million peaceful demonstrators on the highway from possible air attacks by troops loyal to Marcos; a mural inside the shrine's nave depicts the "miracle". The image associated with this particular shrine differs from traditional depictions of the title: Mary, crowned and clad in golden robes, has her arms outstretched, while several white doves surround her.

The Foujita Chapel in Reims, France, is dedicated to Our Lady, Queen of Peace, as a reaction to the horror and devastation caused by the 1945 atomic bombings of Hiroshima and Nagasaki by American forces towards the end of the Second World War.

The chapel at St. Edward's University in Austin, Texas, is also dedicated to Our Lady Queen of Peace.

St. Mary, Queen of Peace Basilica is the pro-cathedral of the Syro-Malankara Catholic Major Archeparchy of Trivandrum in Kerala, India.

Queen of Peace Cemetery of the Catholic Diocese of Rockville Centre in Old Westbury, New York opened in 2020.

Two Roman titular churches are dedicated to Mary Queen of Peace: Santa Maria Regina Pacis a Ostia Lido and Santa Maria Regina Pacis a Monte Verde.

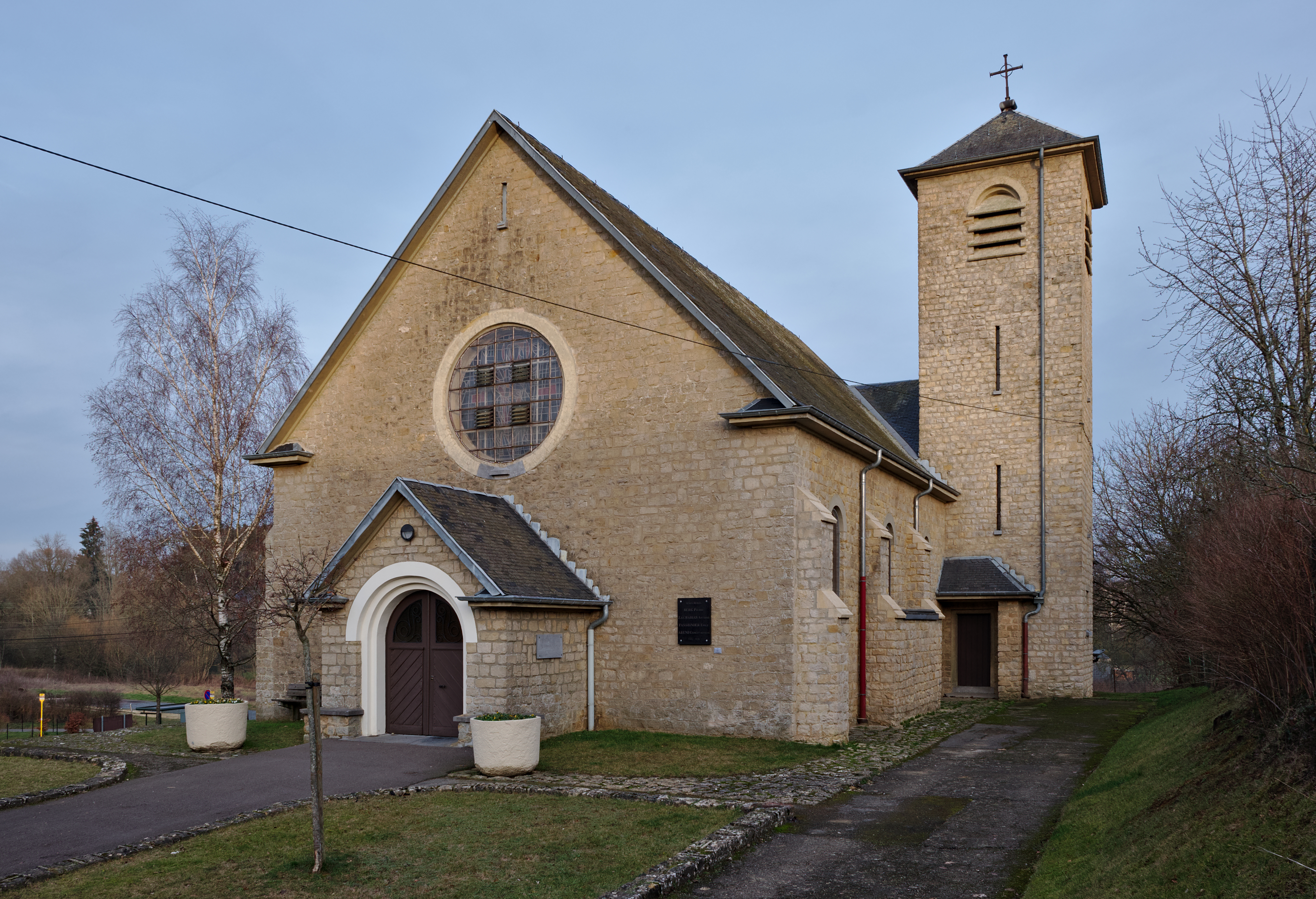
Our Lady of Peace church in Viville, Belgium

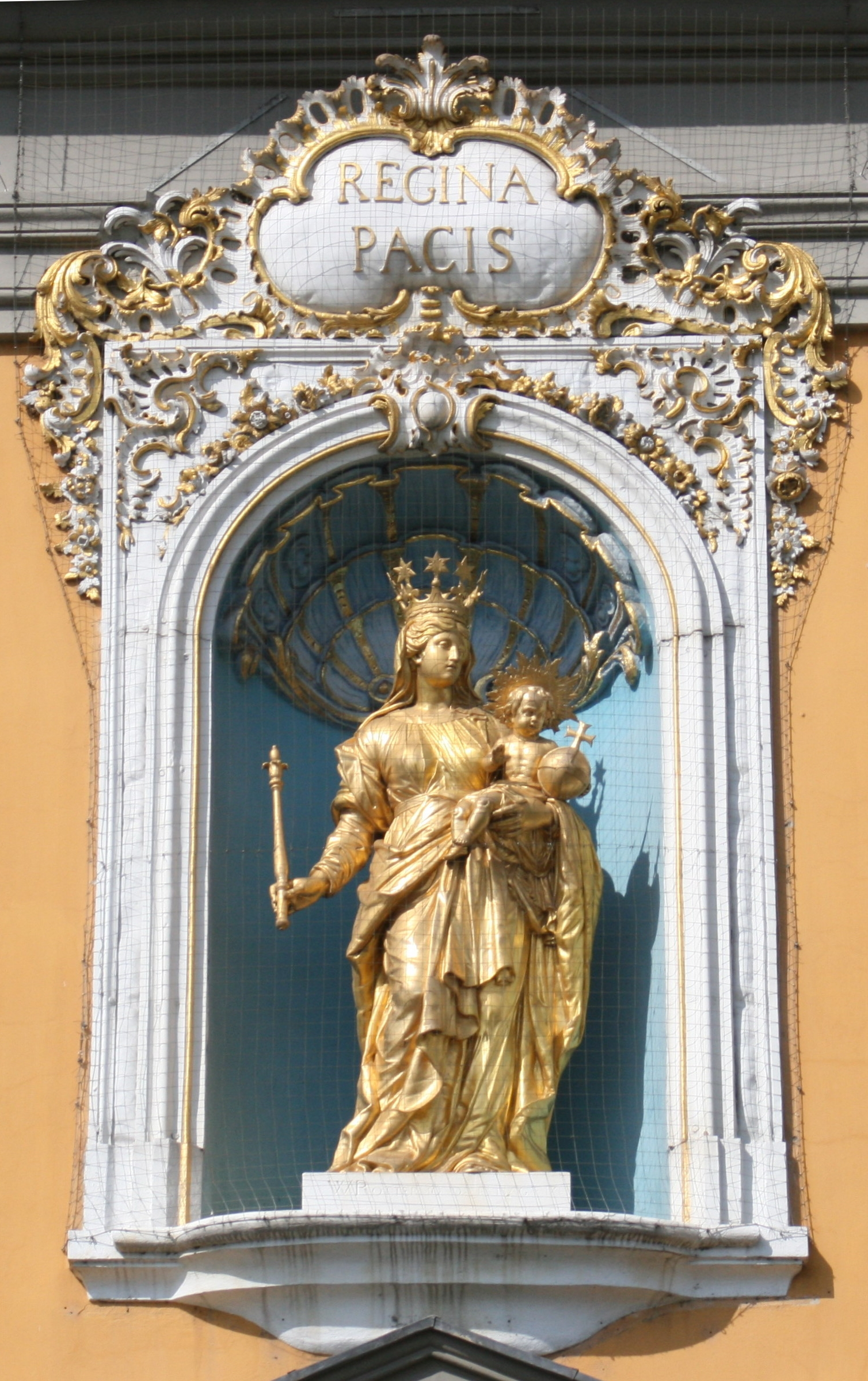
Statue of Our Lady Queen of Peace at the University of Bonn
