= Hervé Le Cléac'h =

French Catholic bishop

Hervé Le Cléac'h SS.CC.
- Bishop Emeritus of Taiohae o Tefenuaenata
- Church: Catholic Church
- Diocese: Diocese of Taiohae o Tefenuaenata
- In office: 1 March 1973 – 31 May 1986
- Predecessor: Louis-Bertrand Tirilly
- Successor: Guy Chevalier

Orders
- Ordination: 18 December 1943
- Consecration: 24 June 1973 by Michel-Gaspard Coppenrath

Personal details
- Born: Hervé Marie Le Cléac'h; 11 March 1915 Dinéault, France
- Died: 13 August 2012 (aged 97)

Hervé Marie Le Cléac'h SS. CC. (11 March 1915 – 13 August 2012) was a French prelate of the Roman Catholic Church.

Hervé Marie Le Cléac'h was born in Dinéault, France, and was ordained a priest on 18 December 1943 from the Roman Catholic religious institute, the Congregation of the Sacred Hearts of Jesus and Mary. Hervé-Marie Le Cléac'h was appointed Bishop of Taiohae o Tefenuaenatal on 1 March 1973 and received his episcopal consecration on 24 June 1973. He resigned governance of the see on 31 May 1986. Le Cléac'h died on 13 August 2012.

In January 1997 he was made an officer of the Order of Tahiti Nui.
