= Alliance of the Hearts of Jesus and Mary =

Catholic devotions to both the Hearts of Jesus and Mary

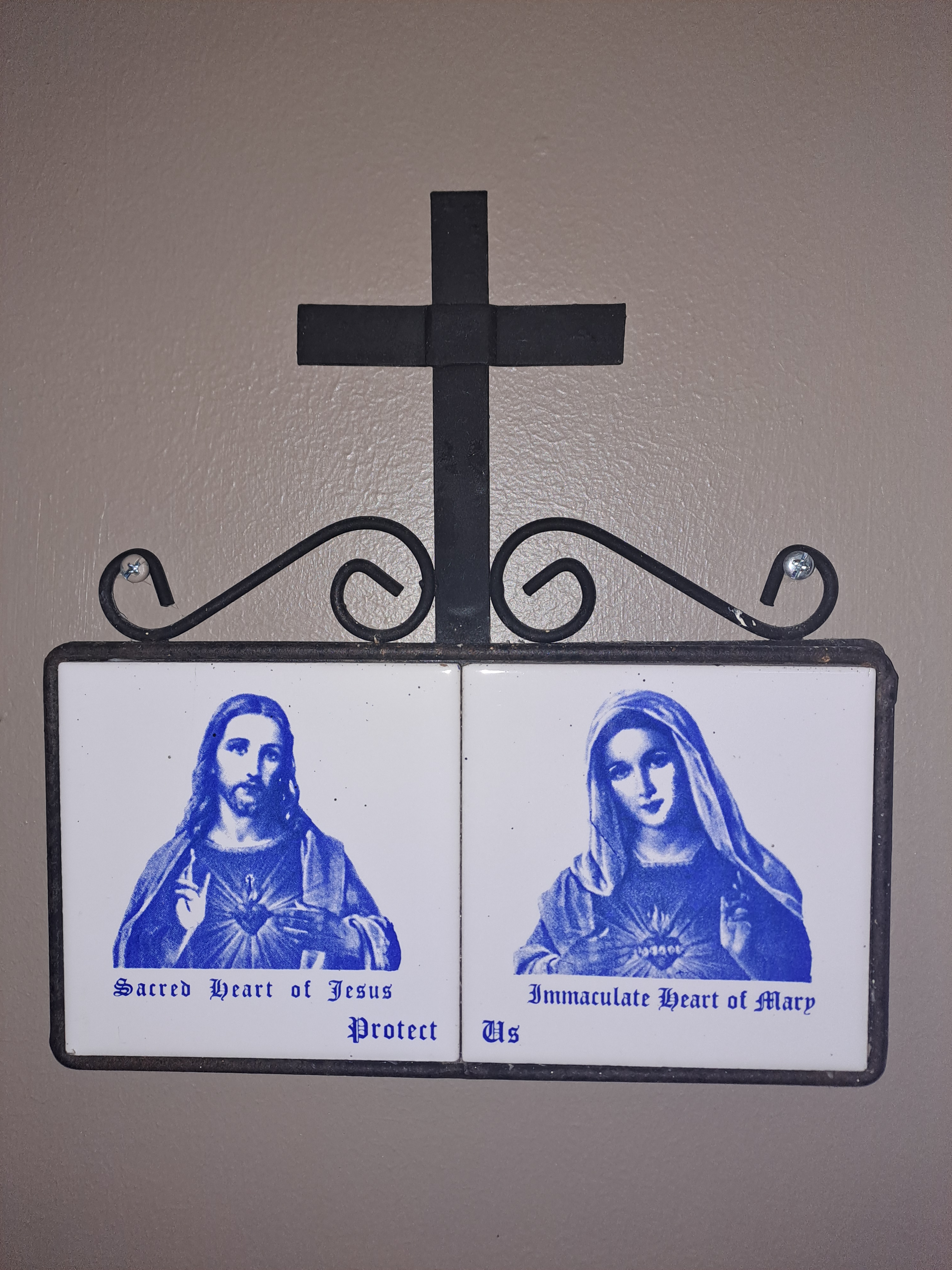
Plaques of the Most Sacred Heart of Jesus and the Immaculate Heart of Mary under a cross

The Alliance of the Hearts of Jesus and Mary is a concept in Catholic theology that refers to the spiritual association between the Most Sacred Heart of Jesus and the Immaculate Heart of Mary. This concept was notably referenced by Pope John Paul II during his Angelus Address on 15 September 1985, where he described the two hearts as being "interrelated by reason of the enduring relation of love that exists between the Son and his Mother"

Following the address, several symposia were convened to examine the theological and devotional significance of the concept. While the devotion to the Sacred Heart of Jesus has a long-established theological background, these conferences primarily focused on the Immaculate Heart of Mary, exploring its scriptural basis and role within the Catholic tradition.

== History ==
After John Paul II remarked on "the admirable alliance of hearts" in 1985, symposia were held on the concept. According to the Marian Library, some Mariologists "saw the alliance as a renewal of the older forms of devotion to the Sacred Heart and the Immaculate Heart by highlighting Mary’s cooperation with Christ in the entire work of Redemption from beginning to end". Other Mariologists, however, "dismissed the entire concept of the Two Hearts as mere 'devotionalism', having no real value for scientific Marian theology because of its association with private revelation." The latter position is seen to prevail in academic theology while the former "continues to have influence outside of it."

=== Most Sacred Heart of Jesus ===
Indications of devotion to the Most Sacred Heart of Jesus appear in the Benedictine and Cistercian monasteries of the eleventh and twelfth centuries, having developed from the earlier devotion to the Holy Wounds.

The devotion was practiced by the Cistercians Bernard of Clairvaux and Lutgardis of Tongres, the Premonstratensian Hermann Joseph von Steinfeld, the Franciscans, the Order of Preachers, and the Carthusians. The Feast of the Sacred Heart was first celebrated with episcopal approval through the influence of John Eudes of the Congregation of Jesus and Mary, on 31 August 1670 at the major seminary of Rennes. Eudes consistently associated the two Hearts, beginning his devotional teachings with the Heart of Mary and then extending them to the Sacred Heart of Jesus.

In 1765, devotion to the Most Sacred Heart of Jesus was formally approved. Pope Pius IX extended the celebration of the Feast of the Most Sacred Heart of Jesus to the entire Roman Catholic Church in 1858.

=== Immaculate Heart of Mary ===
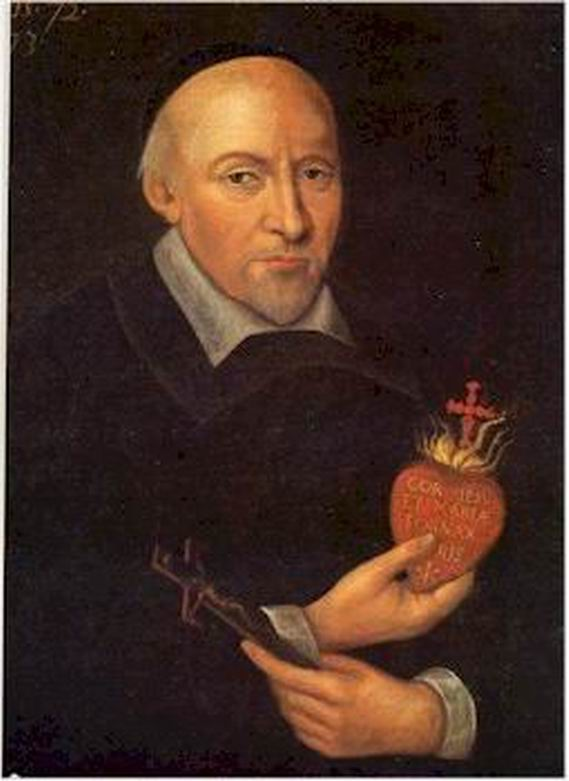
John Eudes (1601–1680) was called the "father, teacher and first apostle" of devotions to the Hearts of Jesus and Mary by two popes.

While devotion to the heart of Mary cannot be traced to the early centuries of Christian history, it is mentioned in the Gospel of Luke and in commentaries by the Fathers of the Church. Though devotion to the heart of Mary was practiced by some individuals such as Anselm of Canterbury, it did not become widespread until the seventeenth century under the influence of Saint John Eudes.

With permission of ecclesiastical authorities, John Eudes liturgically observed a feast of the Heart of Mary on 8 May, beginning from 1648. Eudes was partly influenced by the writings of Francis de Sales who in his writing on the perfections of the Heart of Mary, saw her as model for the love of God. He wrote a mass and office for the feast and composed various prayers. His efforts to secure official approval for an office and feast were unsuccessful. His book Le Cœur Admirable de la Très Sainte Mère de Dieu ("The Admirable Heart of the Most Holy Mother of God") is considered a significant early work on devotion to the Sacred Hearts.

In 1799, Pope Pius VI permitted religious societies in the Archdiocese of Palermo a similar feast like that of John Eudes in Autun, and in 1805, Pope Pius VII extended this permission throughout the whole church. Pius XII consecrated all mankind to the Immaculate Heart on December 8, 1942, and instituted the Feast of the Immaculate Heart of Mary for the Catholic Church in 1945.

== Saints and the Blessed ==
The foundation of the devotions to the Sacred Heart of Jesus and the Immaculate Heart of Mary is seen as laid by the Church Fathers, "by clearly indicating the union of charity which bound them both in the work of redemption." Especially Bonaventure, a Friar Minor, wrote extensive works on the Sacred Heart of Jesus and the Immaculate Heart of Mary.

Since the 17th century, devotions to the Hearts of Jesus and Mary, individually and jointly, have been promoted. While John Eudes played a significant role in formalizing and promoting the joint devotion to the Hearts of Jesus and Mary, the efforts of others also contributed to the environment in which the devotion could flourish. Pope Leo XIII indicated Eudes as the "author of the liturgical worship of the Sacred Heart of Jesus and the Holy Heart of Mary". Both Leo XIII and Pius X called him the "father, teacher and first apostle" of devotions to the Hearts of Jesus and Mary.

In the 18th century, Louis Grignion de Montfort of the Company of Mary was a fervent preacher. In 1830, Catherine Labouré, a Vincentine, reported a vision in which she saw the Sacred Heart of Jesus and Immaculate Heart of Mary, the Heart of Jesus crowned with thorns and the Heart of Mary pierced with a sword. This led to the creation of the Miraculous Medal.

The children who reported the messages of Our Lady of Fátima stated that the Heart of Jesus wished to be honored together with the Heart of Mary. In 1920, shortly before her death at age 9, Jacinta de Jesus Marto, one of the children, discussed the Hearts of Jesus and Mary with Lúcia dos Santos, another one of the children, and said: "Tell everybody that God grants us graces through the Immaculate Heart of Mary; that people are to ask her for them; and that the Heart of Jesus wants the Immaculate Heart of Mary to be venerated at his side. Tell them also to pray to the Immaculate Heart of Mary for peace, since God entrusted it to her." Lúcia dos Santos became a Carmelite and took the religious name Maria Lúcia of Jesus and of the Immaculate Heart.

== Encyclicals ==
In the 1956 encyclical Haurietis aquas, Pope Pius XII stated, "In order that favors in great abundance may flow on all Christians, nay, on the whole human race, from the devotion to the most Sacred Heart of Jesus, let the faithful see to it that to this devotion the Immaculate Heart of the Mother of God is closely joined."

Pope John Paul II stated that "devotion to the Sacred Heart of Jesus and to the Immaculate Heart of Mary has been an important part of the sensus fidei of the People of God". In his 1979 encyclical Redemptor hominis (item 22), John Paul II said:

"We can say that the mystery of the Redemption took shape beneath the heart of the Virgin of Nazareth when she pronounced her "fiat". From then on, under the special influence of the Holy Spirit, this heart, the heart of both a virgin and a mother, has always followed the work of her Son and has gone out to all those whom Christ has embraced and continues to embrace with inexhaustible love ... The Church, which looks to her with altogether special love and hope, wishes to make this mystery her own in an ever deeper manner."

At the beginning of the 21st century, he additionally encouraged all nations to consecrate themselves to the Sacred Heart of Jesus and the Immaculate Heart of Mary, "so that all men and women of the new millennium shall be led towards the One who is the true light that enlightens every man."

== Patronages ==
On Christmas Eve in 1800, amid the French Revolution, Peter Coudrin and Henriette Aymer de Chevalerie established the Congregation of the Sacred Hearts of Jesus and Mary. The congregation of the Sisters of the Sacred Hearts of Jesus and Mary was founded in 1866 by Victor Braun. Since 1997, the Benedictine monastery Heliga Hjärtas founded at that time in South Sweden is under the patronage of the Holy Hearts of Jesus and Mary.

== Liturgy, popular piety and prayers ==
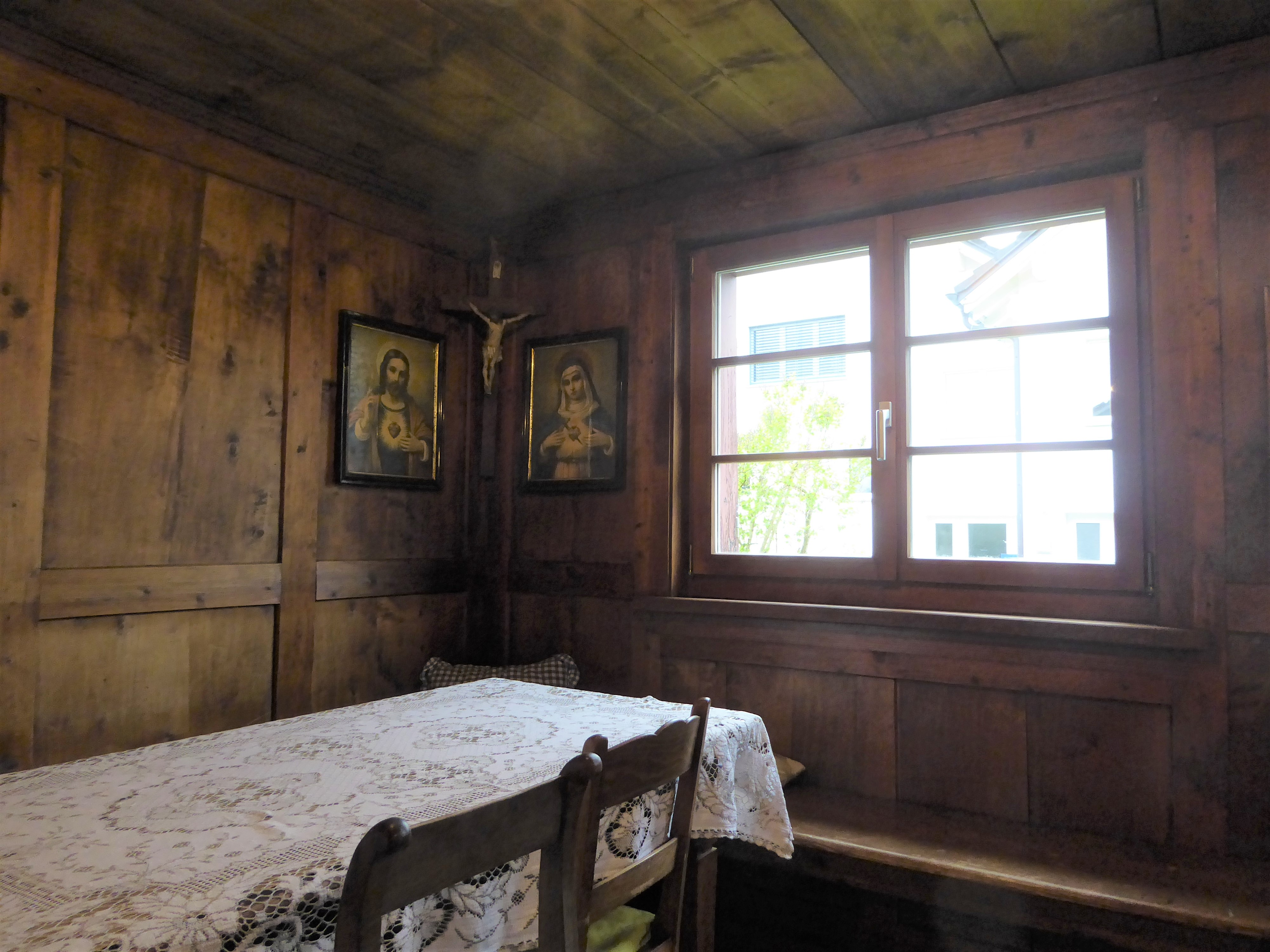
Herrgottswinkel of a farmhouse parlor in Ruggell with the deption of the Hearts of Jesus and Mary beneath a crucifix

The Feast of the Immaculate Heart of Mary is celebrated the day after the Solemnity of the Most Sacred Heart, which always falls on the third Friday after Pentecost.

In some countries it is traditional to hang images of the Sacred Heart of Jesus and the Immaculate Heart of Mary to the right and left of a crucifix or a cross, in the Alpine region often in a so-called Herrgottswinkel (lit.: God's corner).

Due to the close relationship of Mary and Jesus in Catholic teachings on salvation, the Immaculate Heart of Mary is associated with the Sacred Heart of Jesus. The Sacred Heart is viewed as the source of God's love and charity, while devotion to the Immaculate Heart stresses the nature of Mary's love and concern.

In the context of the sacraments, which are seen as gifts to the church, the hearts are sometimes viewed as primary channels of Christ's love and Mary's compassion.

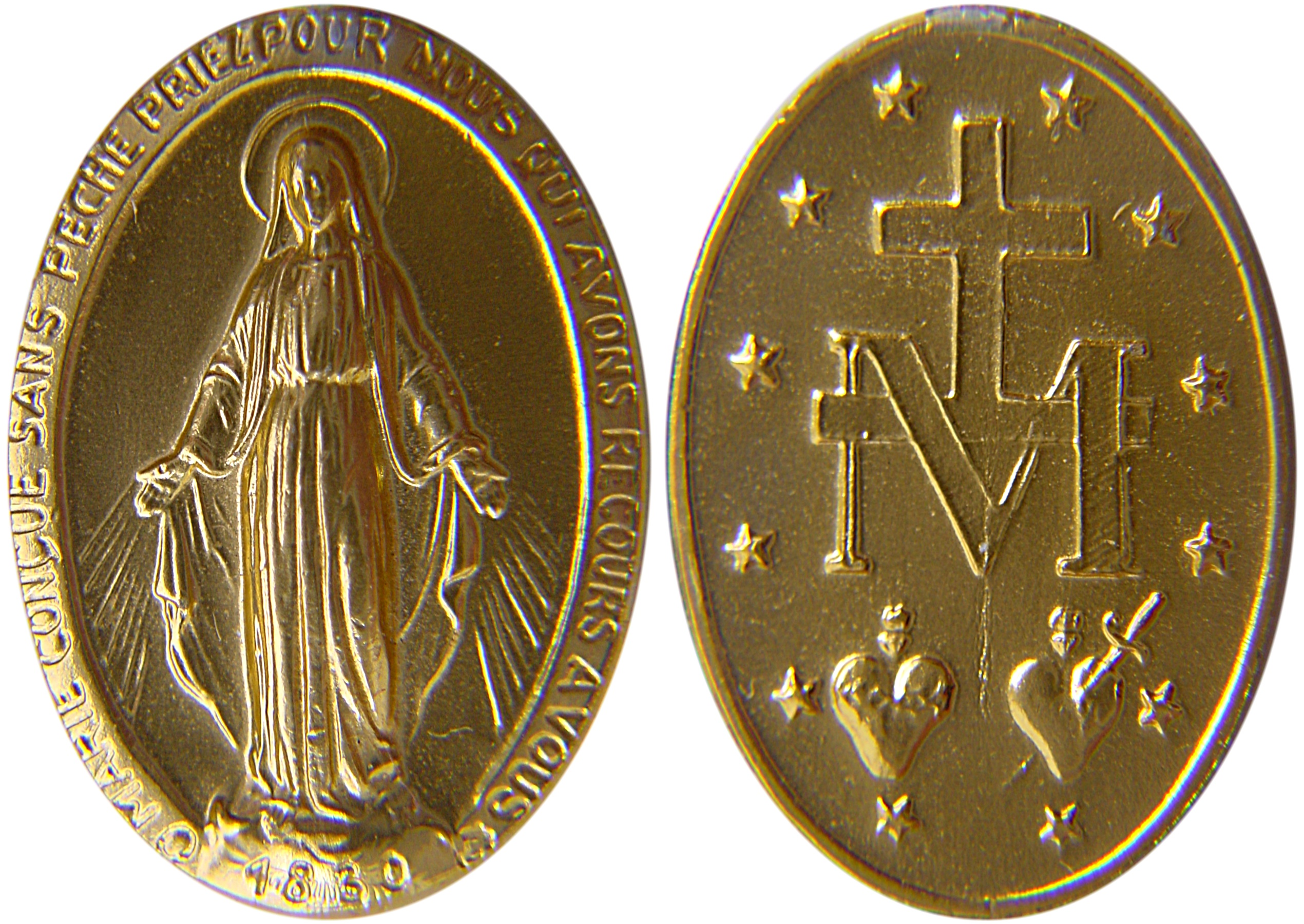
The Miraculous Medal (1830) depicts the two Hearts together below a cross. The M and the twelve stars are Marian symbols.

The reverse side of the Miraculous Medal depicts the Heart of Jesus crowned with thorns and the Heart of Mary pierced with a sword.

The so-called "Morning offering", a prayer which could be personally said at the start of the day in order to consecrate oneself to Jesus Christ, specifically refers to the Immaculate Heart of Mary in offering acts of reparation to the Sacred Heart of Jesus:

The relationship between the Hearts of Jesus and Mary is also reflected in various Catholic prayers, such as the Litany of the Sacred Heart of Mary:

O most merciful God, Who, for the salvation of sinners and the refuge of the miserable, wast pleased that the Immaculate Heart of the Blessed Virgin Mary should be most like in charity and pity to the Divine Heart of Thy Son Jesus Christ; grant that we, who commemorate this most sweet and loving Heart, may by the merits and intercession of the same Blessed Virgin merit to be found according to the Heart of Jesus. Through the same Christ our Lord. Amen.

== See also ==
- Consecration and entrustment to Mary
- Immaculata prayer
