= Tiripone Mama Taira Putairi =

Roman Catholic priest from Polynesia (1846–1881)

Tiripone Mama Taira Putairi, SS.CC., (1846–1881) was educated by French missionaries from birth and became the first indigenous Roman Catholic priest ordained in Eastern Polynesia. He was part of the native royal family of Mangareva, and his father Bernardo Putairi was the island's last ruling regent.

== Life ==
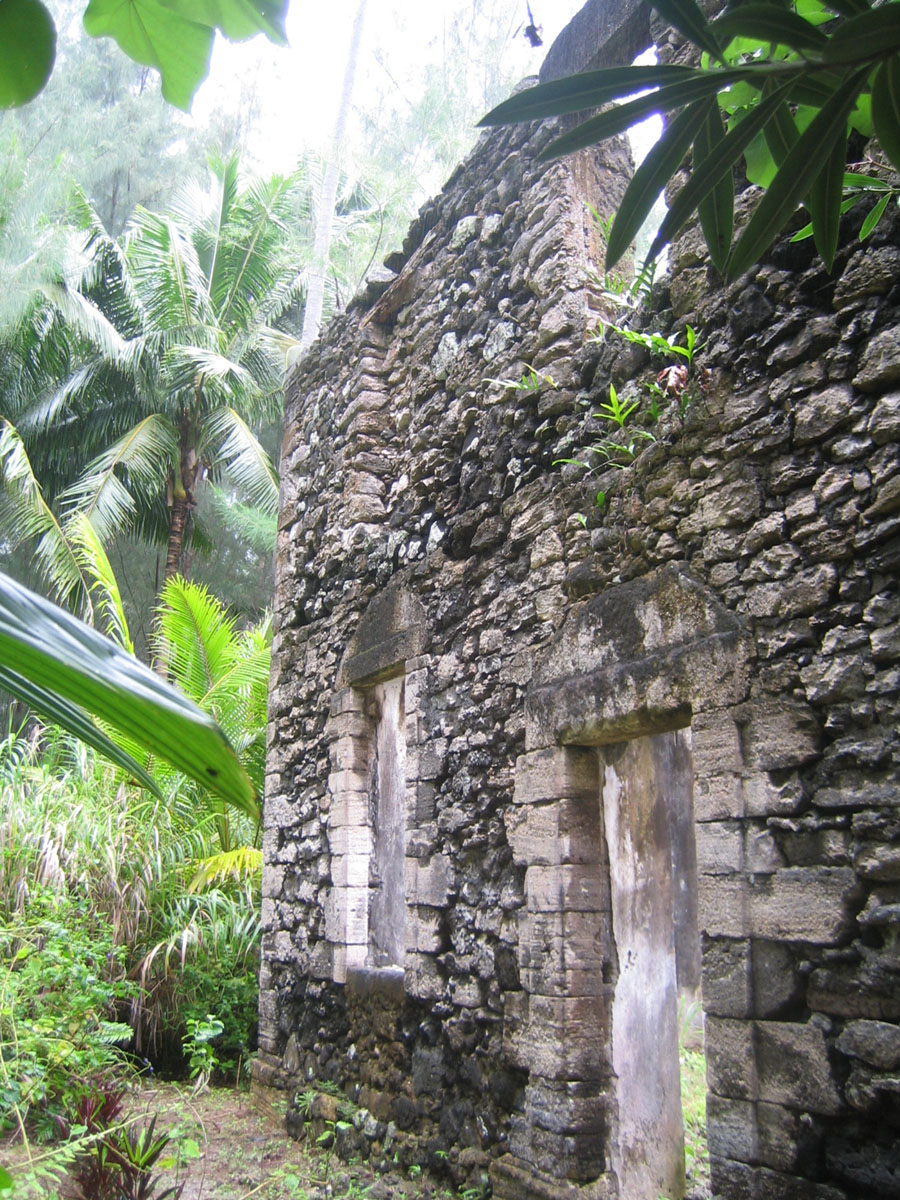
Ruins of the Re'e Seminary College on Aukena, one of the earliest institutions of higher learning in French Polynesia

Tiripone was born to the royal togoʻiti class of chiefs of the island of Mangareva in the Gambier Islands. His family was considered to be from a junior or fallen branch of the main royal line. His parents were Gertrude Toategaru and Bernardo Putairi (also called Maohomotu in some sources), who became the last ruling regent of Mangareva.

Prior to his birth, Christianity was introduced to the Gambier Islands by French Picpus priests, Honoré Laval and François Caret with the support of King Maputeoa and his uncle Matua, the high priest. Brother Urbain de Florit de La Tour de Clamouze, one of these early missionaries, founded and headed the Re'e Seminary College (also known as the College of Anaotiki) on Aukena, one of the earliest institutions of higher learning in the South Pacific, where native Mangarevan boys were taught Latin and French as future clergymen. Tiripone was among these native boys educated at the Aukena College along with the young king Joseph Gregorio II. In 1869, Father Nicolas Blanc sent him to pursue clerical studies on the island of Tahiti. He was tonsured on 21 September 1869 and returned to the Gambiers to work with Father Laval.

On 24 December 1873, he was ordained as a priest in Papeete by Bishop Tepano Jaussen, the Vicar Apostolic of Tahiti. Around this time, he adopted the Christian name Tiripone (after the early Christian saint Tryphon of Campsada). Father Tiripone became the first indigenous person in Eastern Polynesia to be ordained into the Roman Catholic priesthood. There are indications that his religious superiors did not fully trust him because they did not station him back in his native Gambiers. He was assigned to proselytize in Faaone, a village in the modern Tahitian commune of Taiarapu-Est. Father Tiripone worked under the supervision of the retired Father Laval with whom he wrote a traditional history of Mangareva. They wrote E atoga no te ao eteni no Magareva (An Account of the Heathen Times of Mangareva) which was deposited in the archives at the Congregation of the Sacred Heart at Braine-le-Comte, Belgium. The exact details of his work in Faaone are not known. As a catechist priest, he was not allowed to hear confessions and there were fears by his superiors that he would regress to his Polynesian heritage in his personal life. Given these circumstances, he was sent to the Picpus house in Valparaíso in 1879 and died of pneumonia on 27 December 1881.

After Bernardo Putairi became regent of Mangareva in 1873, the French missionaries under Father Blanc and Bishop Jaussen thought the regency would pass from him to his son Tiripone – as a priest, he would bring the Gambiers archipelago into the possession of the Congregation of the Sacred Hearts of Jesus and Mary. However, Tiripone predeceased his father, and the islands were instead annexed by France in 1881.

After Tiripone's death, the Catholic churches of French Polynesia continued to rely on non-native priests. Transferred to Papeete and later Pamatai, the seminary built to educate the indigenous clergy was discontinued by Bishop Jaussen on 30 May 1874, having failed to graduate any more native novitiates. It would not be until 1954 that the next French Polynesian priest Michel-Gaspard Coppenrath was ordained.

== Bibliography ==
- Buck, Peter Henry (1938). Ethnology of Mangareva. Bernice P. Bishop Museum Bulletin. Vol. 157. Honolulu: Bernice P. Bishop Museum Press.
- Deschanel, Paul Eugene Louis (1888). Les intérêts français dans l'océan Pacifique. Paris: Berger-Levrault et cie.
- Garrett, John (1982). To Live Among the Stars: Christian Origins in Oceania. Suva, Fiji: Institute of Pacific Studies, University of the South Pacific. ISBN 978-2-8254-0692-2.
- Lange, Raeburn (2006). Island Ministers: Indigenous Leadership in Nineteenth Century Pacific Islands Christianity (PDF). Christchurch, New Zealand: Macmillan Brown Centre for Pacific Studies, University of Canterbury. ISBN 978-1-74076-176-5.
- Laval, Honoré; Newbury, C. W.; O'Reilly, Patrick (1968). Mémoires pour servir à l'histoire de Mangareva: ère chrétienne, 1834–1871. Paris: Musée de l'Homme.
