= François Baudichon =

Roman Catholic Clergy

François Baudichon SS.CC
- Vicar Apostolic of Marquesas Islands
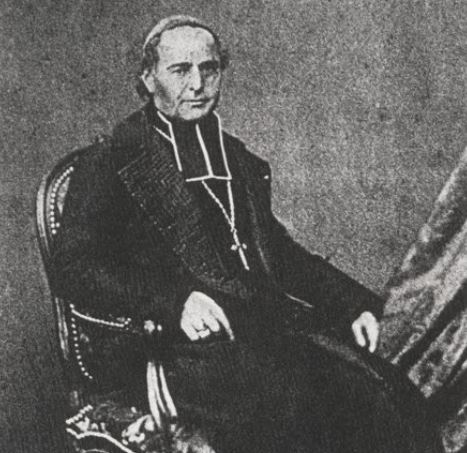
- Church: Catholic Church
- See: Vicariate Apostolic of Marquesas Islands
- In office: 9 May 1848 – 17 January 1855
- Predecessor: Position established
- Successor: René Ildefonse Dordillon
- Other post: Titular Bishop of Basilinopolis (1844-1882)
- Previous post: Vicar Apostolic of Eastern Oceania (1844-1848)

Orders
- Ordination: c. 1838
- Consecration: 21 December 1845 by José Hilarión de Etura y Cevallos

Personal details
- Born: Joseph Baudichon; 18 September 1812 Sainte-Maure-de-Touraine, French Empire
- Died: 11 June 1882 (aged 69) Tours, France

François Baudichon (born in 1812 in Sainte-Maure-de-Touraine) was a French clergyman and bishop for the Roman Catholic Diocese of Taiohae. He was appointed bishop in 1844. He died in 1882.
