= Paul-Laurent-Jean-Louis Mazé =

- Roman Catholic Archdiocese of Papeete
- Installed: 21 June 1966
- Term ended: 5 March 1973
- Successor: Michel-Gaspard Coppenrath

Personal details
- Born: Paul-Laurent-Jean-Louis Mazé; 4 April 1885 Pleyben, France
- Died: 21 December 1976 (aged 91) Tahiti, French Polynesia

Paul-Laurent-Jean-Louis Mazé, SS.CC. (1885–1976) was Archbishop, and later Archbishop Emeritus of the Roman Catholic Archdiocese of Papeete, French Polynesia.

Born on 4 April 1885 in Pleyben, France, he was ordained a priest in the order of the Congregation of the Sacred Hearts of Jesus and Mary on 25 September 1910, aged 25. The Principal Consecrator was Bishop Pierre-Marie-David Le Cadre, SS.CC.

On 8 November 1938, aged 53, he was appointed as Vicar Apostolic of Tahiti, French Polynesia, and as Titular Bishop of Ascalon and ordained on 30 April 1939.

On 21 June 1966, aged 81, he was appointed Archbishop, retiring on 5 March 1973, aged 87, and became Archbishop Emeritus. He died on 21 December 1976, aged 91.
