= Pascal Chang-Soï =

French Polynesian clergyman and bishop

Pascal Chang-Soï SS.CC.
- Bishop of Taiohae o Tefenuaenata
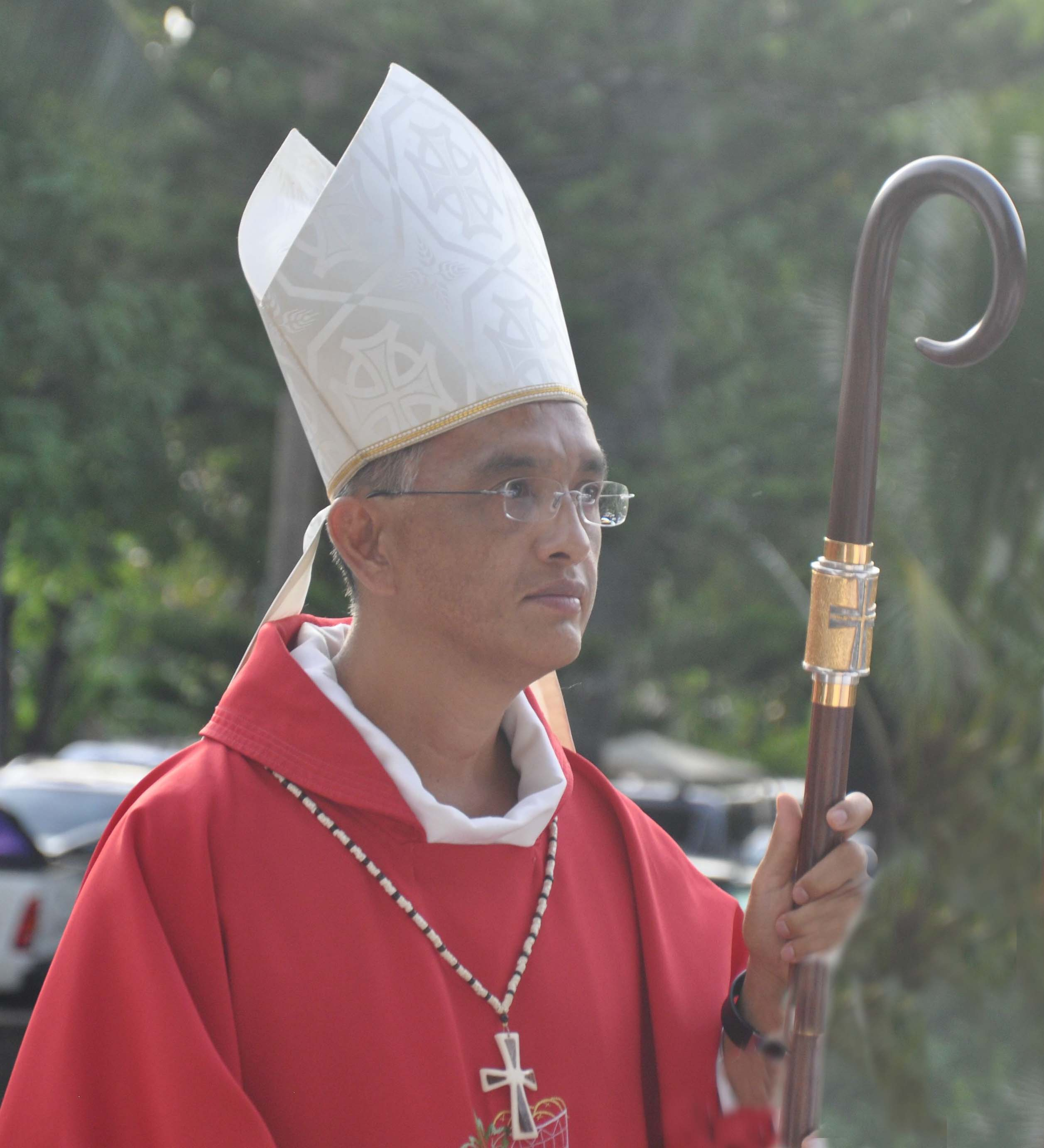
- Church: Catholic Church
- Diocese: Diocese of Taiohae o Tefenuaenata
- Installed: 5 September 2015
- Predecessor: Guy Chevalier
- Previous posts: Apostolic Administrator of Papeete (2013-2015); Coadjutor Bishop of Taiohae o Tefenuaenata (2010-2015)

Orders
- Ordination: 4 February 2000
- Consecration: 4 December 2010 by Charles Daniel Balvo

Personal details
- Born: 18 October 1966 (age 59) Tahiti, French Polynesia, French Community

Pascal Chang-Soï (born October 18, 1966 in Tahiti) is a French Polynesian clergyman and bishop for the Roman Catholic Diocese of Taiohae. He was ordained as a priest on 4 February 2000, and as a bishop on 4 December 2010. In March 2013 he was appointed apostolic administrator of Papeete. He was appointed bishop of Taiohae in 2015.

== See also ==
- Catholic Church in Oceania
