= Roman Catholic Diocese of Taiohae =

Catholic diocese in French Polynesia

Coordinates: 8°54′35″S 140°06′05″W

Diocese of Taiohae Dioecesis Taiohaënus seu Humanae Telluris Diocèse de Taiohae ou Tefenuaenata
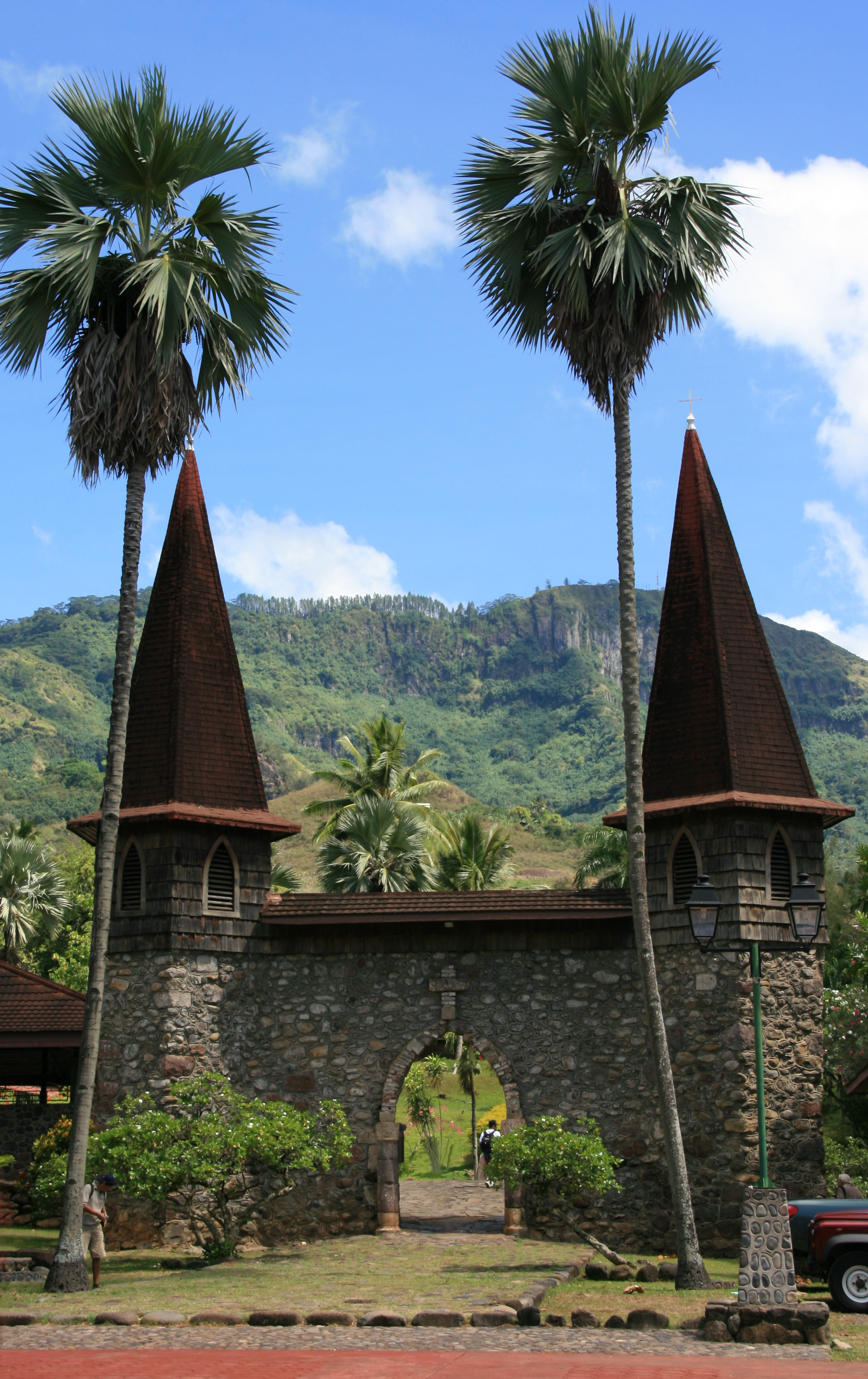
- Notre Dame Cathedral, Taiohae

Location
- Country: French Polynesia, France
- Ecclesiastical province: Papeete
- Metropolitan: Archdiocese of Papeete

Statistics
- Area: 1,250 km^{2} (480 sq mi)
- Population: Total; Catholics: (as of 2010); 9,220; 8,310 (90.1%)

Information
- Denomination: Catholic Church
- Sui iuris church: Latin Church
- Rite: Roman Rite
- Established: 9 May 1848 (As Vicariate Apostolic of Marquesas Islands); 21 June 1966 (As Diocese of Taiohae); 31 May 1974 (As Diocese of Taiohae or Tefenuaenata)
- Cathedral: Notre Dame Cathedral, Taiohae

Current leadership
- Pope: Francis
- Bishop: Pascal Chang-Soï
- Metropolitan Archbishop: Jean-Pierre Edmond Cottanceau, SS.CC.
- Bishops emeritus: Guy André Dominique Marie Chevalier, SS.CC

The Diocese of Taiohae (or Tefenuaenata, or Hakapehi) (Latin: Dioecesis Taiohaënus seu Humanae Telluris; French: Diocèse de Taiohae ou Tefenuaenata) is a Latin Church ecclesiastical jurisdiction or diocese of the Catholic Church in French Polynesia. It is a suffragan diocese in the ecclesiastical province of the Archdiocese of Papeete, yet still depends on the missionary Roman Congregation for the Evangelization of Peoples.

Its cathedral episcopal see is the Cathédrale Notre-Dame des Îles Marquises, dedicated to Mary, mother of Jesus at Taiohae, on Nuku Hiva, Marquesas Islands (French: îles Marquises).

== History ==
- Erected on 1848.05.09 as the Apostolic Vicariate of Marquesas Islands/ Isole Marchesi (Curiate Italian) / Insularum Marchesi (Latin), on insular territory split off from the suppressed Apostolic Vicariate of Eastern Oceania
- Promoted on 1966.06.21 as Diocese of Taiohae / Taiohaën(us) (Latin)
- Renamed 1974.05.31 as Diocese of Taiohae / Hakapehi (synonym) / Tefenuaenata (Marquesan Islands name) / Humanæ Telluris (Latin) / Taiohaën(us) (Latin adjective).

== Statistics ==
As of 2014, it pastorally served 8,970 Catholics (91.2% of 9,835 total) on 1,250 km² in 26 parishes with 4 priests (2 diocesan, 2 religious), 11 lay religious (7 brothers, 4 sisters) and 1 seminarian.

== Bishops ==
=== Ordinaries ===
Apostolic Vicars of Marquesas Islands

- François Baudichon, SS.CC. (1848.05.09 – retired 1855), Titular Bishop of Basilinopolis (1844.08.14 – 1882.06.11); died 1882
- René Ildefonse Dordillon, SS.CC. (1855.12.07 – death 1888.01.11), Titular Bishop of Cambysopolis (1855.12.07 – 1888.01.11)
  - Apostolic Administrator Father Rogatien-Joseph Martin, SS.CC. (1890.04.11 – 1892.06.03 see below), no previous prelature
- Rogatien-Joseph Martin, SS.CC. (see above 1892.06.03 – death 1912.05.27), Titular Bishop of Verinopolis (1892.06.03 – 1912.05.27)
- Pierre-Marie-David Le Cadre, Picpus Fathers (SS.CC.) (1920.12.30 – death 1952.11.21), Titular Bishop of Demetrias (1921.01.05 – 1952.11.21)
- Louis-Bertrand Tirilly, SS.CC. (1953.11.16 – 1966.06.21 see below), Titular Bishop of Buthrotum (1953.11.16 – 1966.06.21)

Suffragan Bishops of Taiohae

- Louis-Bertrand Tirilly, SS.CC. (see above 1966.06.21 – retired 1970.03.17), emeritate as Titular Bishop of Budua (1970.03.17 – resigned 1976.09.27); died 2002
- Hervé Le Cléac'h, SS.CC. (1973.03.01 – retired 1986.05.31), died 2012
- Guy Chevalier, SS.CC. (1986.05.31 – retired 2015.09.05), Bishop Emeritus; succeeded as previous Coadjutor Bishop of Taiohae (1985.03.29 – 1986.05.31)
- Pascal Chang-Soï, SS.CC. (5 September 2015 - ...), previously Coadjutor Bishop of Taiohae (French Polynesia) (2010.08.04 – succession 2015.09.05) and Apostolic Administrator of Papeete (French Polynesia) (2013.03.13 – 2015.08.28).

=== Coadjutor bishops ===
- Guy André Dominique Marie Chevalier, SS.CC. (1985-1986)
- Pascal Chang-Soï, SS.CC. (2010-2015)

== See also ==
- List of Catholic dioceses in South Pacific Conference states

== Sources and external links ==
- GCatholic, with Google map & satellite photo - data for all sections
- "Diocese of Taiohae o Tefenuaenata". Catholic-Hierarchy.
