= Guy Chevalier (bishop) =

French priest

Guy Chevalier SS.CC.
- Bishop Emeritus of Taiohae o Tefenuaenata
- Church: Catholic Church
- Diocese: Diocese of Taiohae o Tefenuaenata
- In office: 31 May 1986 – 5 September 2015
- Predecessor: Hervé Le Cléac'h
- Successor: Pascal Chang-Soï
- Previous post: Coadjutor Bishop of Taiohae o Tefenuaenata (1985-1986)

Orders
- Ordination: 27 June 1964
- Consecration: 15 August 1985 by Hervé Le Cléac'h

Personal details
- Born: 25 May 1938 (age 87) Les Herbiers, France

Guy Chevalier (born May 25, 1938 in Les Herbiers) is a French clergyman and bishop for the Roman Catholic Diocese of Taiohae. He was appointed bishop in 1985. He retired in 2015.

== See also ==
- Catholic Church in France
