= Tahitians =

Indigenous Polynesian people of French Polynesia

Tahitians (Māʼohi) Taʼata Tahiti (Maʼohi) Tahitiens
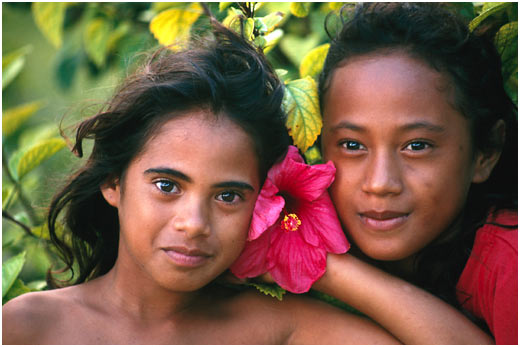
- Tahitian girls

Total population
- c. 185,000 (Ethnic Tahitians worldwide)

Regions with significant populations
- French Polynesia 178,133 (on Tahiti only, August 2007 census)
- United States: 7,935 (2020); 882 (Tahitian alone)
- New Zealand: 2,019 (2023)

Languages
- Tahitian, French

Religion
- Predominantly Christian (Reformed and Roman Catholic); Tahitian mythology (minority)

Related ethnic groups
- Other Polynesians (particularly Native Hawaiians and Rapa Nui)

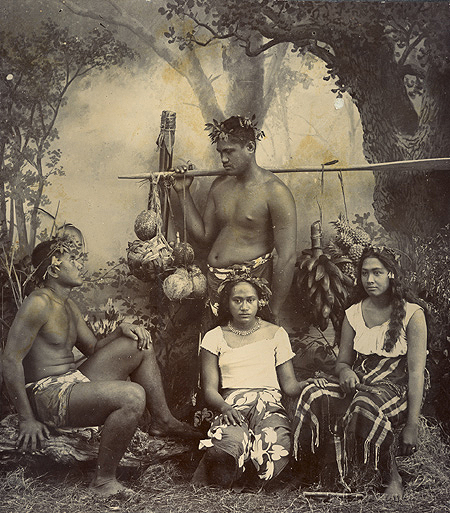
Tahitians, c. 1870–90

The Tahitians (Tahitian: Māʼohi; French: Tahitiens) are the Indigenous Polynesian people of Tahiti and thirteen other Society Islands in French Polynesia. The numbers may also include the modern population in these islands of mixed Polynesian and French ancestry (French: demis). Indigenous Tahitians are one of the largest Polynesian ethnic groups, behind the Māori, Samoans and Hawaiians.

== History ==
=== Pre-European period and customs ===
The first Polynesian settlers arrived in Tahiti around 400 AD by way of Samoan navigators and settlers via the Cook Islands. Over the period of half a century there was much inter-island relations with trade, marriages and Polynesian expansion with the Islands of Hawaii and through to Rapa Nui.

The original Tahitians cleared land for cultivation on the fertile volcanic soils and built fishing canoes. The tools of the Tahitians when first discovered were made of stone, bone, shell or wood.

The Tahitians were divided into three major classes (or castes): ariʼi, raʼatira and manahune. Ariʼi were relatively few in number while manahune constituted the bulk of population and included some members who played essential roles in the society. It is estimated that by the first contact with Europeans in 1767 the population of Tahiti was most probably around 110,000 or even reached 180,000. Other Society Islands held probably 15,000-20,000 people.

Tahitians divided the day into the periods of daylight (ao) and darkness (pō). There was also a concept of irrational fear called mehameha, translated as uncanny feelings. The healers, familiar with herbal remedies, were called taʼata rāʼau or taʼata rapaʼau. In the 19th century Tahitians added the European medicine to their practice. The most famous Tahitian healer Tiurai, of ariʼi, died at age 83 during the influenza outbreak on Tahiti in 1918.

=== Colonization ===
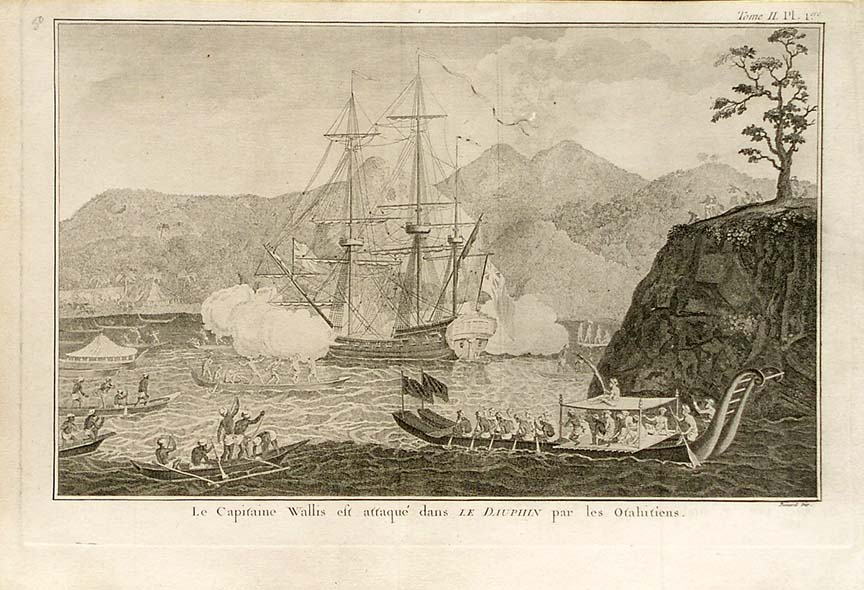
Wallis's ship HMS Dolphin in Tahiti 1767

The colonization of Tahiti occurred in a time of rivalry for resources of the Pacific by colonizing European nations including the French and the British. It was also a time of rivalry and fighting between the people of Tahiti and neighbouring islands. It is unclear which is the first European ship to arrive at the island of Tahiti but it is often recognised as being HMS Dolphin captained by British Captain Samuel Wallis on 18 June 1767. He met a welcoming party of Tahitians who traded with him. Cultural differences leading to grave communication errors that resulted in a battle in Matavai Bay between three hundred war canoes and HMS Dolphin which fired on the war canoes with muskets, quarterdeck guns and then cannons. The Tahitian chief Obera (Purea) ordered peace offerings from her people after this battle and Wallis and the Tahitians departed on amicable terms when he left on 27 July 1767. A few months later the French arrived on 2 April 1768 with the ships Boudeuse and Etoile captained by Louis-Antoine de Bougainville.

In the 1790s European whalers arrived, bringing alcohol, prostitution, and religious missionaries along with them. In the 1820s Protestantism became the main religion on Tahiti. The European ships brought such diseases for which Tahitians had little or no acquired immunity, such as dysentery, smallpox, scarlet fever, typhoid fever, venereal disease and tuberculosis. As a result of these changes, by 1830 the population of Tahiti decreased to 15,300 from estimated 110,000 in 1767, when the ship HMS Dolphin touched on the island. The 1881 census enumerated about 5,960 indigenous Tahitians. The recovery continued in spite of more epidemics.

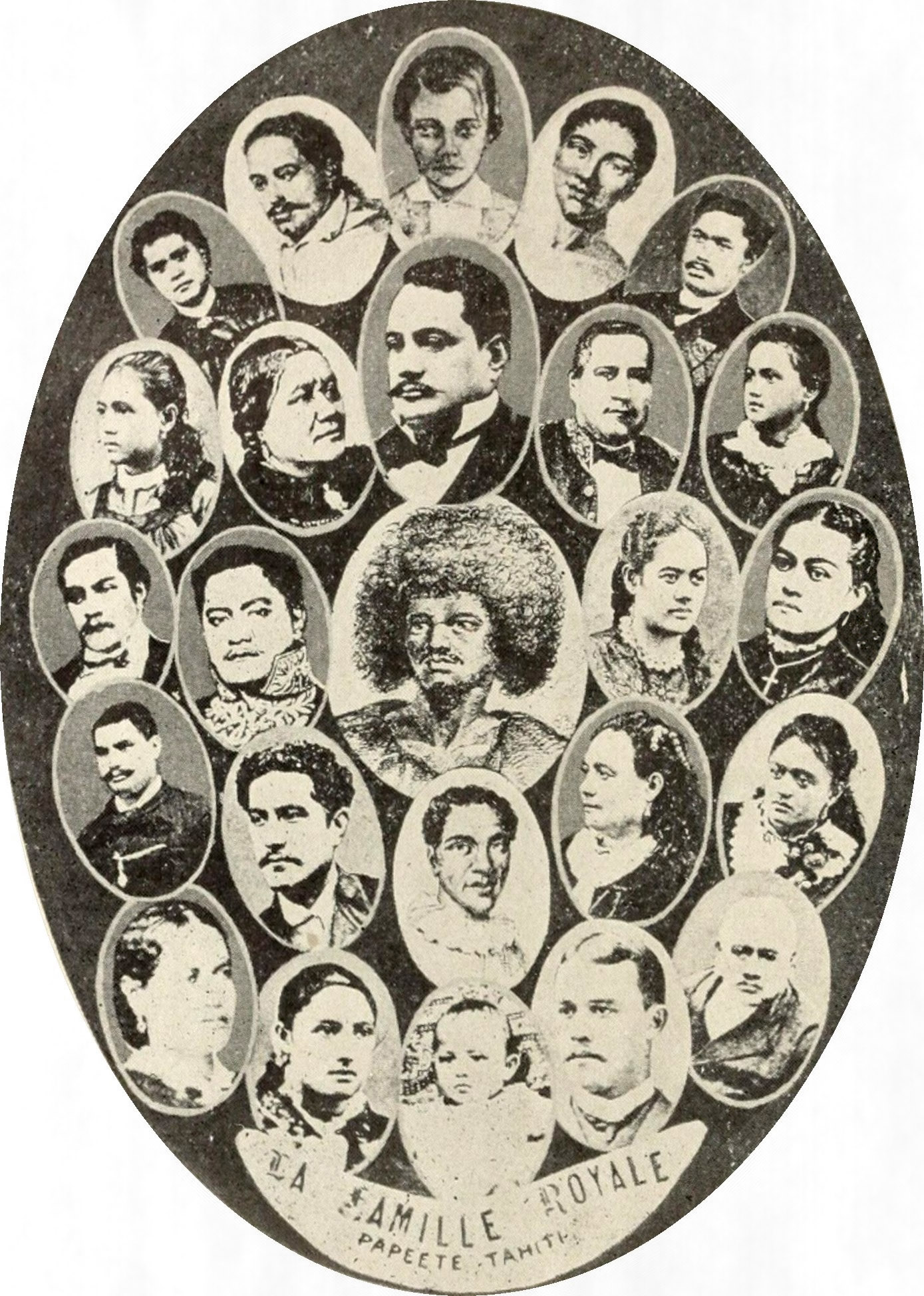
Montage of people in the Pōmare royal family

The Pōmare Dynasty rose to prominence in the early 1790s from a ruling Tahitian family aided by protection from British mercenaries from the mutineers on the Bounty. On 29 June 1880, King Pōmare V agreed to a treaty of annexation with the French. On 9 September 1842, there was a protectorate treaty signed between Tahitians and the French. The agreement was for the "protection of indigenous property and the maintenance of a traditional judicial system."

In 1958 the islands in the area including Tahiti were "reconstituted as a French Overseas Territory and renamed French Polynesia".

In 2013 the United Nations relisted French Polynesia as a territory to be decolonised.

=== Modern day ===
Three hundred Tahitian volunteers fought in the European theatre of World War II with the Free French Forces.

In the late 1960s and early 1970s Tahitian poets Henri Hiro, Charles Manutahi, Vaitiare and Turo Raapoto spearheaded the anticolonial writing in Tahiti. Hiro's God of Culture implores Oihanu, the Tahitian god of culture and husbandry, to empower the "new generation". Three women writers - Michou Chaze, Chantal Spitz and Vaitiare explore the problems of Tahitian identification in contemporary French Polynesia. Tahitian peasants and workers call themselves the "true Tahitians" (Taʼata Tahiti Mau) to distinguish from part-Europeans (Taʼata ʼafa Popaʼa). At the same time demis quite frequently identify themselves as indigenous people in terms of culture and political affiliation. Such Tahitian activists as Pouvanaa a Oopa, Francis Sanford and Charlie Ching and Catholic bishops Michel-Gaspard Coppenrath and Hubert Coppenrath are of demi ancestry.

Many natives were painted from life by Paul Gauguin, who gave Tahitian titles to his works. In Ea haere ia oe (Where Are You Going?), for example, a pensive young girl wears the white flower tiare behind her left ear, signifying readiness to take a lover.

Tahitians are French citizens and are represented by three elected deputies to the French National Assembly and two representatives in the French Senate. Tahitians vote by universal adult suffrage in all major French elections.

== See also ==
- Maohi
