= Pierre-Marie-David Le Cadre =

Pierre-Marie-David Le Cadre SS.CC.
- Vicar Apostolic of Marquesas Islands
- Church: Catholic Church
- See: Vicariate Apostolic of Marquesas Islands
- In office: 30 December 1920 – 21 November 1952
- Predecessor: Rogatien-Joseph Martin
- Successor: Louis-Bertrand Tirilly
- Other post: Titular Bishop of Demetrias (1921-1952)

Orders
- Ordination: 29 July 1900
- Consecration: 4 September 1921 by Alcime-Armand-Pierre-Henri Gouraud

Personal details
- Born: 30 August 1875 Questembert, France
- Died: 21 November 1952 (aged 77)

Pierre-Marie-David Le Cadre (born in 1875 in Questembert) was a French clergyman and bishop for the Roman Catholic Diocese of Taiohae. He was appointed bishop in 1920. He died in 1952.
