= Louis-Bertrand Tirilly =

Louis-Bertrand Tirilly SS.CC.
- Bishop of Taiohae
- Church: Catholic Church
- Diocese: Diocese of Taiohae
- In office: 21 June 1966 – 17 March 1970
- Predecessor: Pierre-Marie-David Le Cadre
- Successor: Hervé Le Cléac'h
- Other post: Titular Bishop of Budua (1970-1976)
- Previous posts: Titular Bishop of Buthrotum (1953-1966); Vicar Apostolic of Marquesas Islands (1953-1966)

Orders
- Ordination: 25 July 1937
- Consecration: 12 September 1954 by André Fauvel

Personal details
- Born: 25 January 1912 Le Guilvinec, France
- Died: 25 October 2002 (aged 90)

Louis-Bertrand Tirilly (born in 1912 in Guivinec) was a French clergyman and bishop for the Roman Catholic Diocese of Taiohae. He was appointed bishop in 1953. He died in 2002.
