= René Ildefonse Dordillon =

French clergyman and bishop

René Ildefonse Dordillon SS.CC.
- Vicar Apostolic of Marquesas Islands
- Church: Catholic Church
- See: Apostolic Vicariate of Marquesas Islands
- In office: 7 December 1855 – 11 January 1888
- Predecessor: François Baudichon
- Successor: Rogatien-Joseph Martin
- Other post: Titular Bishop of Cambysopolis (1855-1888)

Orders
- Ordination: 2 July 1832
- Consecration: 8 February 1857 by Rafael Valentín Valdivieso

Personal details
- Born: October 1808 Sainte-Maure-de-Touraine, Indre-et-Loire, French Empire
- Died: 11 January 1888 (aged 79) Taioha'e, Marquesas Islands, Protectorate of French Polynesia, French Empire

René Ildefonse Dordillon (October 1808 – 11 January 1888) was a French clergyman and bishop.

Dordillon was born in 1808 in Sainte-Maure-de-Touraine. He was a French clergyman and bishop for the Roman Catholic Diocese of Taiohae. He was appointed bishop in 1855. He died in 1888.
