= Rogatien-Joseph Martin =

Rogatien-Joseph Martin SS.CC.
- Vicar Apostolic of Marquesas Islands
- Church: Catholic Church
- See: Vicariate Apostolic of Marquesas Islands
- In office: 3 June 1892 – 27 May 1912
- Predecessor: René Ildefonse Dordillon
- Successor: Pierre-Marie-David Le Cadre
- Other post: Titular Bishop of Verinopolis (1892-1912)
- Previous post: Apostolic Administrator of Marquesas Islands (1890-1892)

Orders
- Consecration: 1 January 1893 by Patrick William Riordan

Personal details
- Born: 15 March 1849 Geneston, France
- Died: 27 May 1912 (aged 63)

Rogatien-Joseph Martin (March 15, 1849 – May 27, 1912) was a French clergyman and bishop for the Roman Catholic Diocese of Taiohae. He was appointed bishop in 1892. He died in 1912.
