= Papeete Cathedral =

Papeete Cathedral Cathédrale de Papeete Notre-Dame de L'Immaculée Conception (in French)
- Cathedral of Our Lady of the Immaculate Conception of Papeete
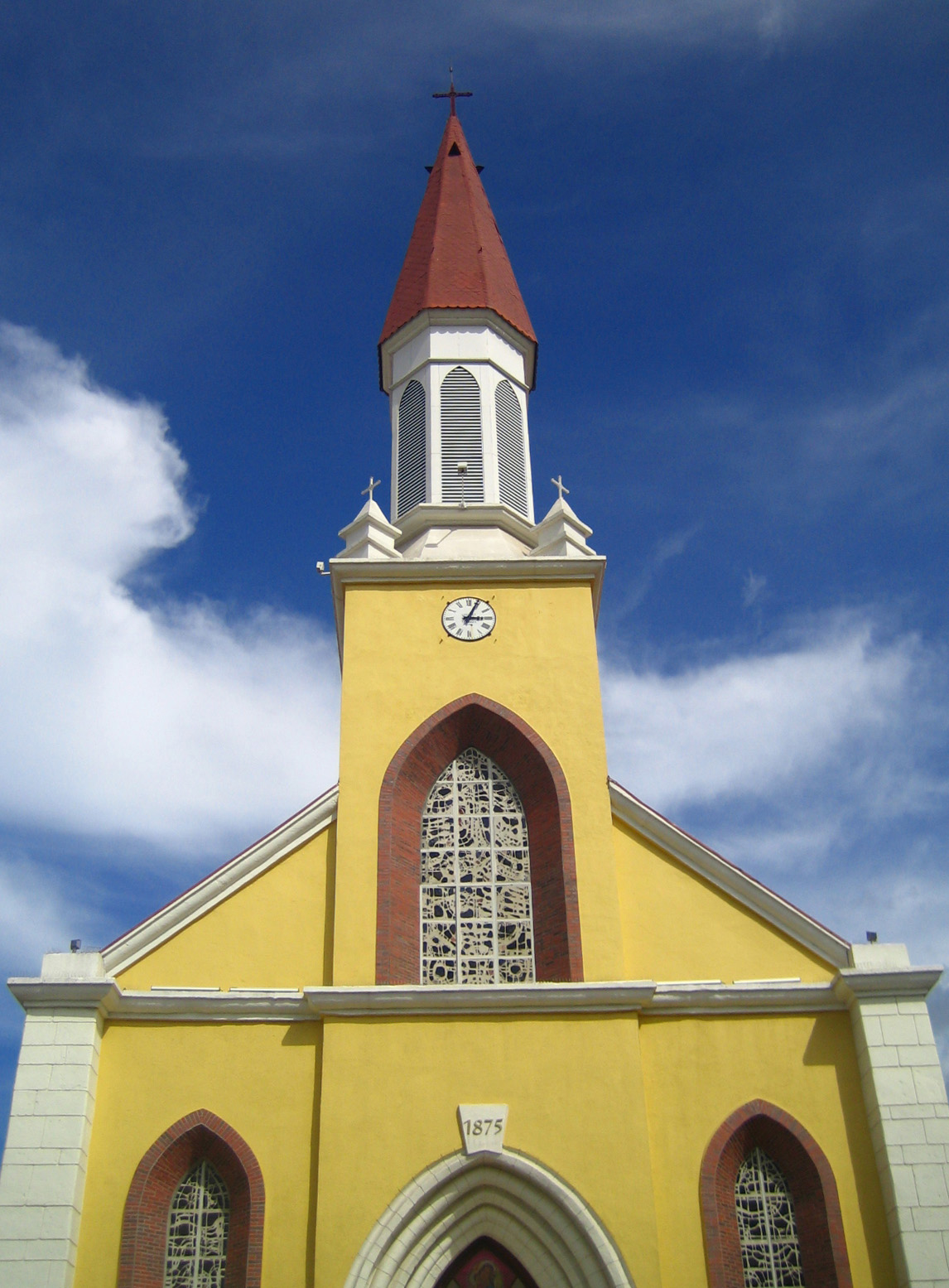
- Papeete Cathedral
- Papeete Cathedral; Cathédrale de Papeete Notre-Dame de L'Immaculée Conception (in French)
- 17°32′25″S 149°34′1″W
- Location: Rue du Général de Gaulle, Papeete
- Country: French Polynesia France
- Denomination: Roman Catholic

History
- Status: Cathedral
- Consecrated

Architecture
- Functional status: Active
- Groundbreaking
- Completed: 1875

Administration
- Archdiocese: Archdiocese of Papeete

Clergy
- Archbishop: Vacant

Papeete Cathedral (French: Cathédrale de Papeete Notre-Dame de L'Immaculée Conception) is a late 19th-century church dedicated to Our Lady of the Immaculate Conception that serves as the cathedral of the Roman Catholic Archdiocese of Papeete. It is located close to the waterfront esplanade of Papeete in Tahiti, the capital of French Polynesia, on the rue du Général de Gaulle.

The construction of the cathedral began in the middle of the 19th century and it opened in 1875. It is the oldest Catholic church in Tahiti and one of Papeete's last remaining examples of early colonial architecture.

== History ==
In the 19th century, France began expanding its colonial empire into Asia and the Pacific Islands, declaring the Kingdom of Tahiti a protectorate in 1842. French missionaries began arriving in the same year and an apostolic vicariate was established on May 9, 1848. Construction of the cathedral most likely started after this time and it was completed in 1875. Named after Notre Dame de Paris, the cathedral was built near the waterfront in midtown Papeete.

== Architecture ==
=== Exterior ===
The entrance of the cathedral features a red steeple at the centre that faces towards Mont Aorai.

=== Interior ===
The interior of the church is noted for its mixture of European and local Polynesian features in its design. This is demonstrated in a full-size woodcarving of the Madonna and Child, the latter of whom is clutching a breadfruit. This work of art originated from the Marquesas Islands.

The cathedral is also known for its artistic representations of the Stations of the Cross. Created by Yuel Durnad and St. Fond, the stations incorporate both Tahitian and Roman cultures in the style of dress, but solely depict Polynesian people in the scenes of The Passion. The artistic style of the paintings was influenced by Paul Gauguin.
