= Notre Dame Cathedral, Taiohae =

Notre Dame Cathedral Cathédrale Notre-Dame de Taiohae (in French)
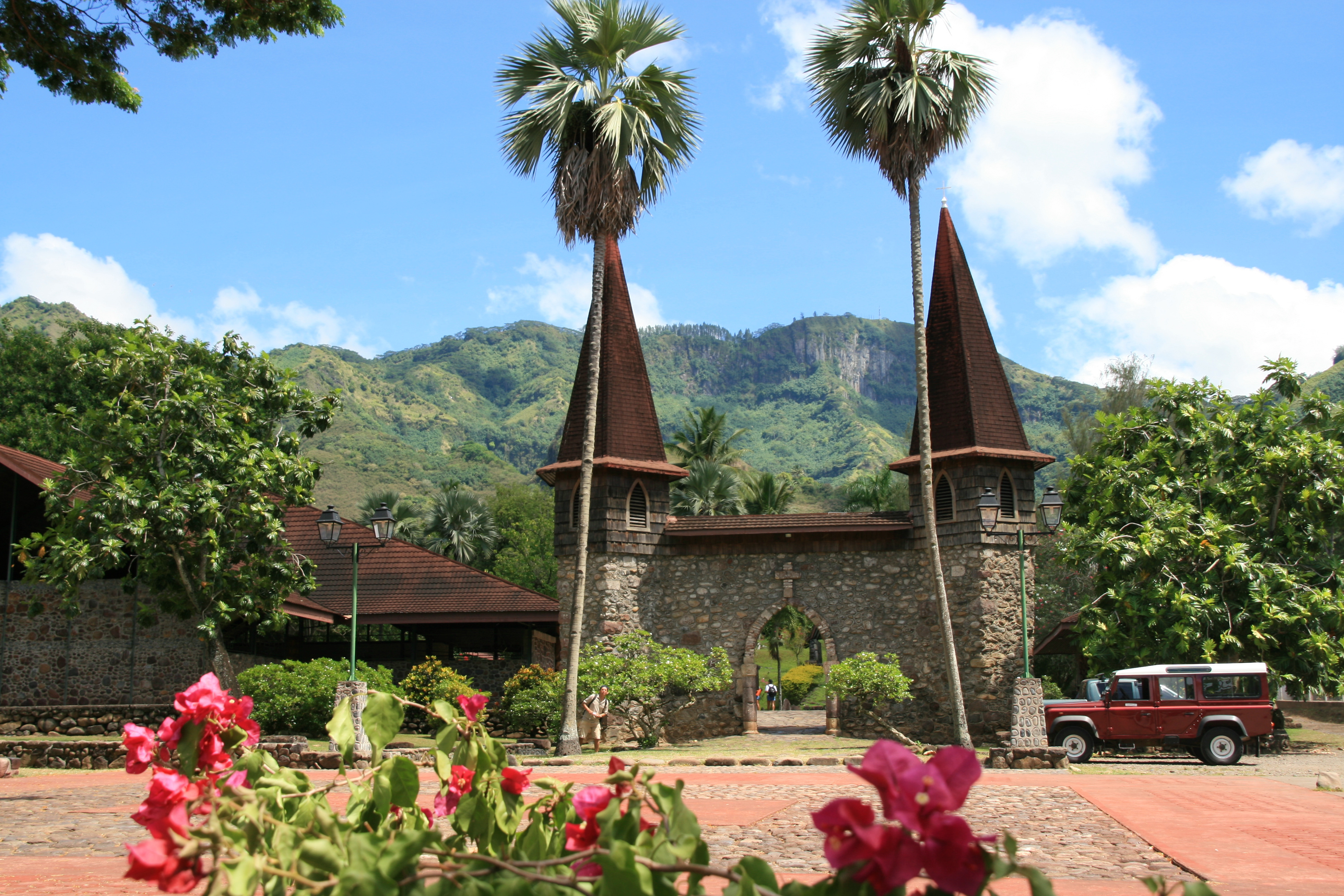
- Notre Dame Cathedral, Taiohae
- Notre Dame Cathedral; Cathédrale Notre-Dame de Taiohae (in French)
- 8°54′37″S 140°6′11″W
- Location: Taioha'e
- Country: Marquesas Islands, French Polynesia, France
- Denomination: Roman Catholic

History
- Status: Cathedral

Architecture
- Functional status: Active
- Groundbreaking: 1973
- Completed: 1977

Administration
- Archdiocese: Roman Catholic Diocese of Taiohae or Tefenuaenata

Clergy
- Archbishop: Pascal Chang-Soï

Notre Dame Cathedral (French: Cathédrale Notre-Dame de Taiohae; Cathédrale Notre-Dame des Marquises) is a 20th-century church that serves as the cathedral of the Roman Catholic Diocese of Taiohae or Tefenuaenata. It is located in the Meau Valley near the capital centre on the island of Nuku Hiva.

The construction of the cathedral began in 1973 on the site of an earlier 19th-century church by the same name. The new cathedral opened in 1977. It is the largest church on the Marquesas Islands.

== History ==
In the 19th century, France began expanding its colonial empire into Asia and the Pacific Islands, conquering Tahuata in 1842. Soon, the rest of the Marquesas Islands fell under French rule. Even though the colonial administrators chose to focus most of their resources on Tahiti—believing it was the more valuable of the two islands—Catholic missionaries, nevertheless, continued spreading the faith. Their persistence paid off and an apostolic vicariate was established on May 9, 1848. Construction of the cathedral most likely started after this time. It was built on land that was treated as sacred ground by the ancient Marquesans and was completed in the later part of the 19th century.

Almost a century later, construction on a new cathedral commenced in 1973; it was completed four years later in 1977. The two bell towers and a section of the wall from the old cathedral were preserved and are now utilized as part of the entrance to the cathedral compound.

== Architecture ==
=== Exterior ===
The entrance of the cathedral is flanked by statues of Saint Peter and Saint Paul carved from rosewood. The exterior walls of the church are made of wood and stone, with "elaborately carved" doors at the entrance. The stones were given by each of the six inhabited islands of the Marquesas.

=== Interior ===
The interior of the church is noted for its mixture of European and local Marquesan features in its design. This is demonstrated in numerous pieces of art adorning the cathedral. An artwork entitled The Passion, the pulpit and the Stations of the Cross were all carved from whole tamanu trees, with the stations having been carved by Damien Haturau. The first station shows Jesus praying in the Garden of Gethsemane at the Mount of Breadfruit—as opposed to the Mount of Olives. The pulpit has the symbols of the Four Evangelists carved into it, with the floor behind it laid with Ua Pou flower stones.
