= Henriette Aymer de La Chevalerie =

Servant of God Henriette Aymer de La Chevalerie SSCC
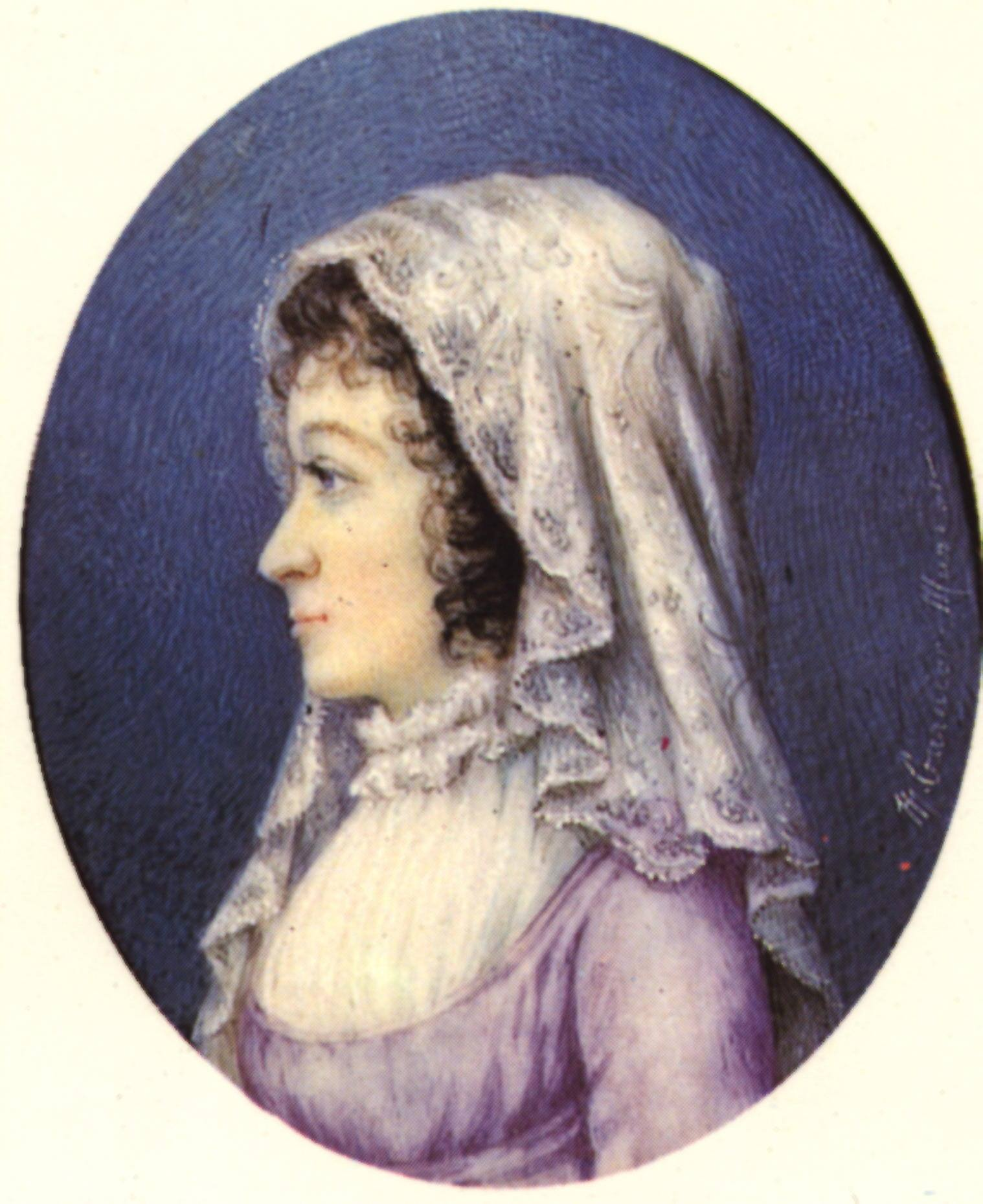
- Portrait of Henriette Aymer de La Chevalerie
- Born: 8 November 1767; St.-Georges-de-Noisne, France
- Died: 23 November 1834; Paris, France

Henriette Aymer de La Chevalerie (8 November 1767 – 23 November 1834) was a French religious sister, who along with Peter Coudrin founded the Congregation of the Sacred Hearts of Jesus and Mary.

== Life ==
She was born in the small castle of Aymer, to an aristocratic family in St.-Georges-de-Noisne near Poitiers France. She had two brothers, one older, and one younger. As a child, she spent time at the Abbaye Sainte-Croix de Saint-Benoît in Poitiers, to better prepare for her first communion. Her father died when she was eleven. Living in French society in the later years of the "Ancien Regime", Henriette received an education in the religious values of the French tradition and the somewhat superficial formation considered appropriate for a woman. In her youth, her life centered on glamorous events of the aristocracy, but she was arrested in October 1793 along with her mother during the French Revolution for giving shelter to persecuted priests. Barely escaping an execution, she was released in September 1794.

In prison, she began a religious life. She was released from prison in September 1794, at the age of twenty-eight. After her release, she joined the Association of the Sacred Heart of Jesus, which was founded in 1792 by Susanne Geoffroy and some companions. The Association was a group of women who gathered secretly to pray and to help priests who were living in hiding. Henriette belonged to a small group called “The Solitaires” within the Association of the Sacred Heart. This group became more drawn to live a religious life.

There, she met the priest Pierre Coudrin. Together with him, she founded the Congregation of the Sacred Hearts of Jesus and Mary. To this end, they bought a house in 1797 on the Rue des Hautes-Treilles in Poitiers, called "Grand'Maison". On Christmas Day 1800, she and Coudrin took solemn vows and that day can be considered the founding date of the Congregation. Mother Aymer de la Chevalerie led the female branch of the Congregation.

In 1805, the congregation moved from Poitiers to Paris on the rue de Picpus, hence the name Picpus congregation. This became the Mother House. The statue of Our Lady of Peace, venerated in the Congregation, was welcomed there on 6 May 1806.

Although Henriette Aymer kept mostly to herself, she showed gentleness and kindness to the sisters and came to be called "La bonne mère", i.e. the good mother. She made more than twenty foundations in different parts of France, attended to the sisters’ formation and supported the superiors she appointed to local communities.

On 4 October 1829, she suffered a stroke and was paralyzed on the right side, and died in 1834. The cause for her beatification was formally opened on 11 June 1927, granting her the title of Servant of God. Closure of the Diocesan Stage in the Process of the Beatification occurred in 2008.

== See also ==
- Alliance of the Hearts of Jesus and Mary
