= Michel-Gaspard Coppenrath =

French Polynesian Roman Catholic archbishop

His Excellency Michel-Gaspard Coppenrath
- Archbishop emeritus of Papeete
- Installed: 5 March 1973
- Term ended: 4 June 1999
- Predecessor: Paul-Laurent-Jean-Louis Mazé
- Successor: Hubert Coppenrath

Personal details
- Born: Michel-Gaspard Coppenrath; 4 June 1924 Papeete, Tahiti, French Polynesia
- Died: 16 August 2008 (aged 84) French Polynesia

Monsignor Michel-Gaspard Coppenrath (4 June 1924 – 16 August 2008) was the Tahitian Archbishop of the Roman Catholic Archdiocese of Papeete in French Polynesia for 26 years from 1973 until 1999. Coppenrath served as the Archbishop Emeritus of the Roman Catholic Archdiocese of Papeete from 1999 until his death in 2008. Coppenrath was the first Tahitian-born Catholic bishop of French Polynesia.

== Early life ==
Michel-Gaspard Coppenrath was born in Papeete, Tahiti and was a demi, of half-Tahitian descent. He later moved to France, where he served as a member of the French Resistance against Nazi occupation during World War II before joining the priesthood. Coppenrath was ordained as a Catholic priest in Poitiers, France, on 29 June 1954, when he was thirty years old. He was the first ordained priest of indigenous Polynesian descent in French Polynesia since Tiripone Mama Taira Putairi in 1874. He further obtained both a degree in civil law as well as a doctorate in Canon law.

== Archbishop of Papeete ==
Coppenrath initially became a Vicar in Papeete due to his doctorate in Canon law. However, he was soon appointed a parish priest in Pirae, a commune located along the northern coast of Tahiti. Coppenrath worked with local youth movements, as well as the media, while assigned to Pirae.

Coppenrath was elevated to vicar-general to Monsignor Paul-Laurent-Jean-Louis Mazé in 1966. He was next appointed the archbishop of the titular see Tigisis in Numidia (present-day Aïn el-Bordj, Algeria) on 16 February 1968. He held that post until he was appointed the Archbishop of Papeete.

Michel-Gaspard Coppenrath was formally appointed the archbishop of the Roman Catholic Archdiocese of Papeete on 5 March 1973. He would serve as archbishop for the next 26 years. Coppenrath earned a reputation during his tenure as someone to turn to during French Polynesia's political and social crises. He was often consulted by French Polynesia's political and religious leaders. He retired as archbishop in 1999. Pope John Paul II and the Roman Catholic Church appointed Coppenrath's brother, Hubert Coppenrath, as his successor on 4 June 1999, which also marked the 75th birthday of Michel-Gaspard Coppenrath. The appointment of Coppenrath's brother, a blood relative, as archbishop is a rare occurrence within the Catholic Church. Coppenrath continued to serve as Archbishop Emeritus of the Diocese of Papeete. He also served as a parish priest in the Commune of Punaauia, which is located on the west coast of Tahiti.

== Death ==
Michel-Gaspard Coppenrath died of a ruptured aneurysm on 14 August 2008, aged 84. His survivors included his brother, the next archbishop of Papeete Hubert Coppenrath, and two nieces, Béatrice Vernaudon, the mayor of Pirae and a former member of the French National Assembly, and Armelle Merceron, who served as the French Polynesian solidarity minister under President Gaston Tong Sang.

A public wake and funeral were held at the Maria No Te Hau Catholic Church in the Mission neighborhood of Papeete. Several thousand people from throughout Tahiti and Moorea, including many prominent French Polynesian and French government officials, attended his funeral. The crowds were so large that a large television screen had to be set up outside of the church. All Catholic schools in Faʻaʻā, Papeete, Pīraʻe and Punaʻauia were closed on 18 August 2008, the day of Coppenrath's funeral.

Coppenrath's brother and successor, Archbishop Hubert Coppenrath, thanked those in attendance saying, "On behalf of my brother.... I would like to thank everyone who sent their sympathy to Archbishop Michel Coppenrath." He also described his brother as "an evangelist, a visionary and a man attentive to the people."

French Polynesian President Gaston Tong Sang gave the eulogy at Coppenrath's funeral. Tong Sang said of Coppenrath, "Michel Coppenrath, in the great evangelic tradition of your predecessors, you gave your life to the service of faith, the Catholic Church and its faithful, with full respect of man and other beliefs. Your righteousness and your openness, your broad culture, your natural authority and your love of others were unanimously appreciated in our 'country’, but also among other churches in Oceania."

Coppenrath's death earned messages of condolence from across French Polynesia. The Rev. Taaroanui Maraea, current president of the Maohi Protestant Church, praising Coppenrath as full of "compassion and his brotherly love" and saying that he "hasn't forgotten the ecumenical work he undertook, opening the possibilities of encounter and recognition between the two churches".

The recently appointed High Commissioner of the Republic in French Polynesia, Adolphe Colrat called Coppenrath "a great builder of the (Catholic) Church, particularly concerned with training (French) Polynesian priests. He leaves the lasting memory of a man profoundly good and warm whose great courtesy was only equaled by the firmness of his beliefs." Tributes were also extended by Oscar Temaru, Bruno Sandras, Gaston Flosse and Jean-Christophe Bouissou.

Michel-Gaspard Coppenrath was interred at the Priests' Cemetery in Tahiti.
