= Saint-Georges-de-Noisné =

- Commune
- Location of Saint-Georges-de-Noisné
- Location within France Location within Nouvelle-Aquitaine
- Coordinates: 46°29′37″N 0°15′19″W
- Country: France
- Region: Nouvelle-Aquitaine
- Department: Deux-Sèvres
- Arrondissement: Parthenay
- Canton: La Gâtine

Government
  - Mayor (2020–2026): Ludovic Bire
- Area^{1}: 24.64 km^{2} (9.51 sq mi)
- Elevation: 194 m (636 ft)
- Highest elevation: 204 m (669 ft)
- Lowest elevation: 80 m (260 ft)
- Population (2023): 684
  - Density: 27.8/km^{2} (71.9/sq mi)
- Time zone: UTC+01:00 (CET)
  - Summer (DST): UTC+02:00 (CEST)
- INSEE/Postal code: 79253 /79400
- ^{1} French Land Register data, which excludes lakes, ponds, glaciers > 1 km^{2} (0.386 sq mi or 247 acres) and river estuaries.

Saint-Georges-de-Noisné (French pronunciation: [sɛ̃ ʒɔʁʒ də nwane]) is a commune in the Deux-Sèvres department in western France.

== See also ==
- Communes of the Deux-Sèvres department
