= Hubert Coppenrath =

Roman Catholic prelate (1930–2022)

His Excellency Hubert Coppenrath
- Archbishop Emeritus of Papeete
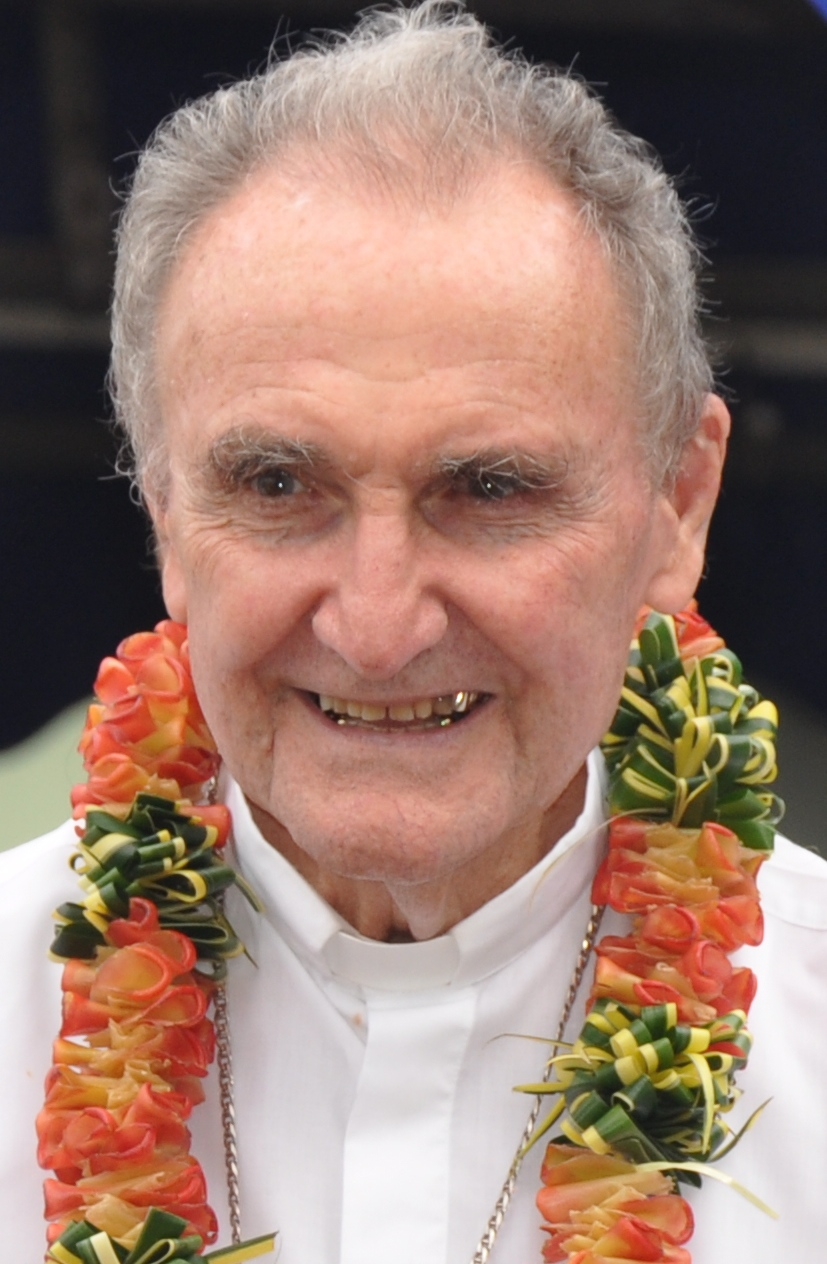
- Installed: 4 June 1999
- Term ended: 31 March 2011
- Predecessor: Michel-Gaspard Coppenrath
- Successor: Jean-Pierre Edmond Cottanceau

Orders
- Ordination: 27 June 1957
- Consecration: 21 February 1998 by Michel-Gaspard Coppenrath
- Rank: Archbishop

Personal details
- Born: Hubert Coppenrath; 18 October 1930 Papeete, Tahiti, French Polynesia
- Died: 31 July 2022 (aged 91) Papeete, Tahiti, French Polynesia

Archbishop Hubert Coppenrath (18 October 1930 – 31 July 2022) was a French Polynesian Roman Catholic prelate, who served as Archbishop of the Roman Catholic Archdiocese of Papeete.

== Biography ==
Coppenrath was born in Papeete, Tahiti, French Polynesia. He was ordained as a Roman Catholic priest on 27 June 1957, in Tahiti. Coppenrath was an advocate for the Tahitian language and in 1974 he became one of the founding members of the Tahitian Academy. He was formally ordained as the Archbishop of the Roman Catholic Archdiocese of Papeete on 4 June 1999 after appointment by Pope John Paul II. He succeeded his own brother, Michel-Gaspard Coppenrath, as Archbishop. On 31 March 2011 Pope Benedict XVI accepted the resignation of Coppenrath from the pastoral care of the archdiocese having reached the age limit.

In June 2020 he was appointed an Officer of the Order of Tahiti Nui.

Catholic Church titles
Preceded by Michel-Gaspard Coppenrath	Archbishop of Papeete; 1999–2011	Succeeded by Jean-Pierre Edmond Cottanceau
