= Archdiocese of Papeete =

Catholic archdiocese in French Polynesia

Coordinates: 17°32′06″S 149°34′11″W

Archdiocese of Papeete Archidioecesis Papeetensis Archidiocèse de Papeete
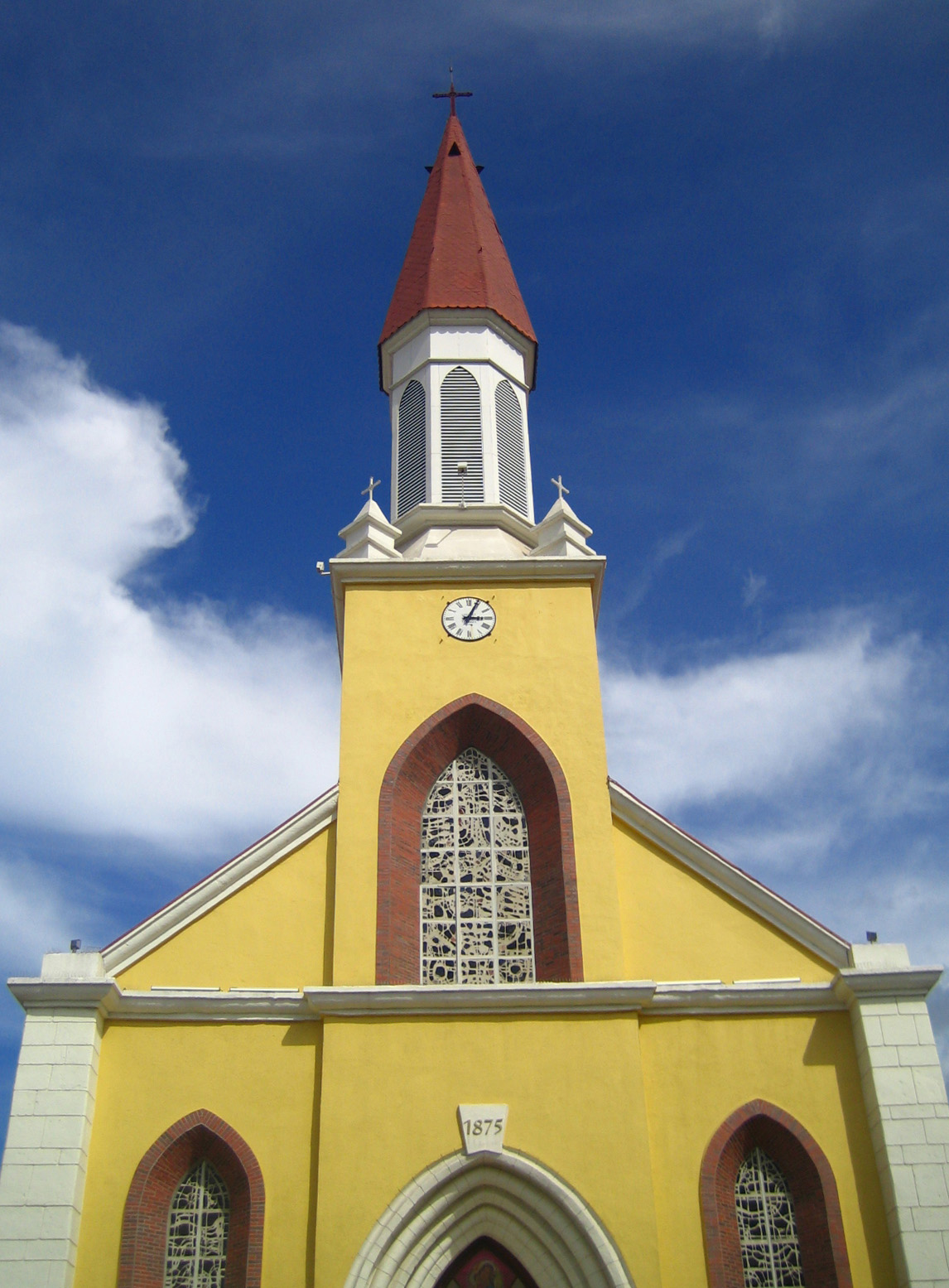
- Papeete Cathedral

Location
- Country: French Polynesia, France
- Ecclesiastical province: Papeete

Statistics
- Area: 2,615 km^{2} (1,010 sq mi)
- Population: Total; Catholics: (as of 2004); 236,693; 89,000 (37.6%)

Information
- Denomination: Roman Catholic
- Sui iuris church: Latin Church
- Rite: Roman Rite
- Established: 9 May 1848 (As Vicariate Apostolic of Tahiti); 21 June 1966 (As Archdiocese of Papeete)
- Cathedral: Papeete Cathedral

Current leadership
- Pope: Leo XIV
- Metropolitan Archbishop: Jean-Pierre Edmond Cottanceau, SS.CC.
- Suffragans: Diocese of Taiohae o Tefenuaenata

Website
- www.catholic.pf

The Archdiocese of Papeete (Latin: Archidioecesis Papeetensis; French: Archidiocèse de Papeete) is a Catholic Metropolitan Archdiocese in French Polynesia. It is responsible for the suffragan diocese of Taiohae o Tefenuaenata.

The former Vicariate Apostolic of Tahiti, established in 1848 as successor to the Vicariate of Eastern Oceania which was founded in 1833, was elevated to the Archdiocese of Papeete in 1966.

== Vicars Apostolic ==
- Florentin-Étienne Jaussen (1848–1884)
- Marie-Joseph Verdier, SS.CC. (1884–1908)
- André-Etienne-Athanase Hermel, SS.CC. (1908–1932)
- Julien-Marie Nouailles, SS.CC. (1932–1937)
- Paul-Laurent-Jean-Louis Mazé, SS.CC. (1938–1966)

== Archbishops ==
- Paul-Laurent-Jean-Louis Mazé (1966–1973)
- Michel-Gaspard Coppenrath (March 5, 1973 – June 4, 1999)
- Hubert Coppenrath (June 4, 1999 – March 31, 2011)
- Jean-Pierre Edmond Cottanceau, SS.CC. (since 15 December 2016)

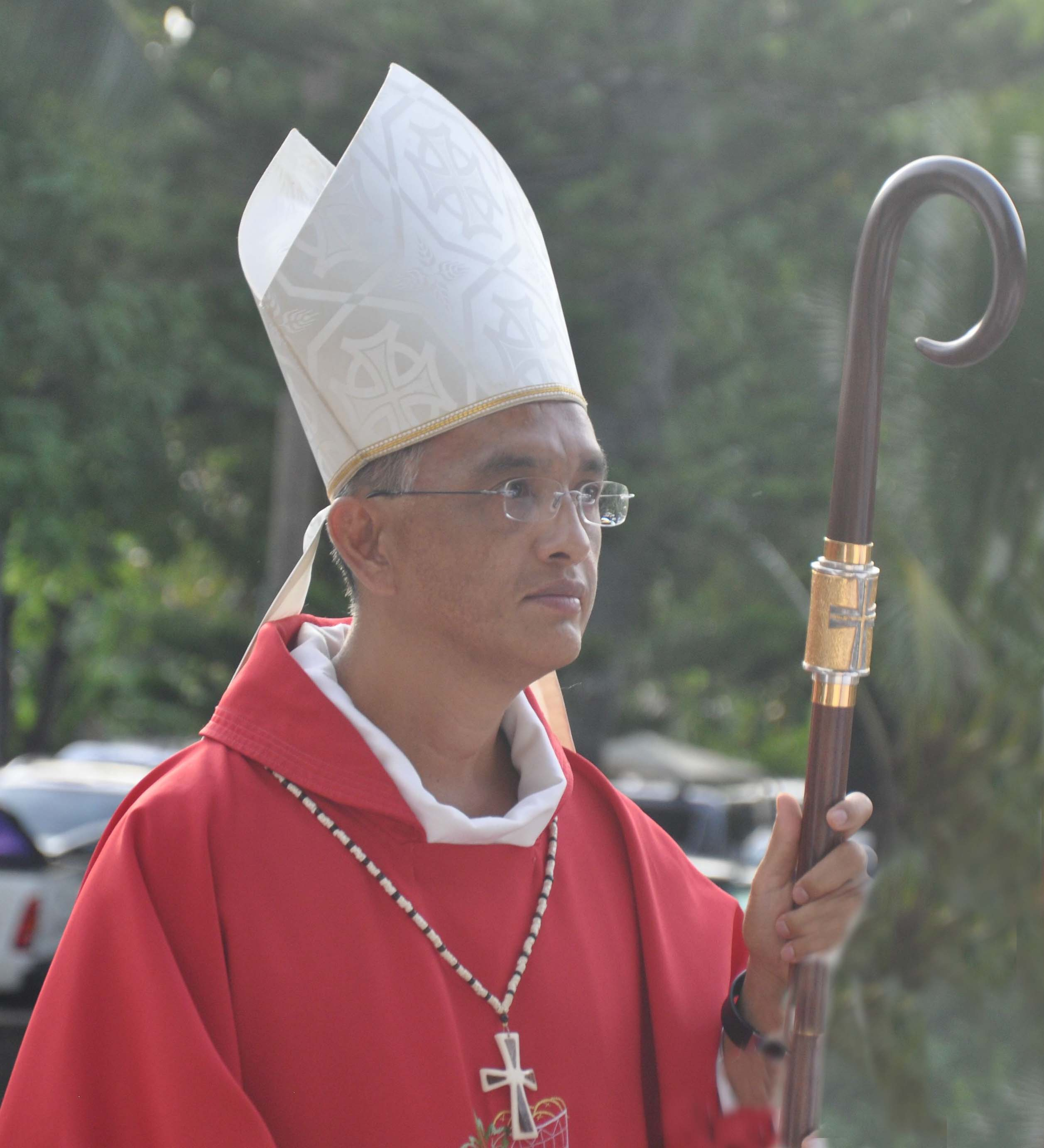
Apostolic Administrator Pascal Chang-Soï

=== Coadjutor bishops ===
- Antoine-Magloire Doumer, SS.CC. (1848–1878), as Coadjutor vicar apostolic; did not succeed to see
- Marie-Joseph (Maxime Justin Félix) Verdier, SS.CC. (1883–1884), as Coadjutor vicar apostolic
- André-Etienne-Athanase Hermel, SS.CC. (1905–1908), as Coadjutor vicar apostolic
- Michel-Gaspard Coppenrath (1968–1973)
- Hubert Coppenrath (1997–1999)
