= Pierre Coudrin =

French missionary (1768–1836)

Servant of God Pierre Coudrin SSCC
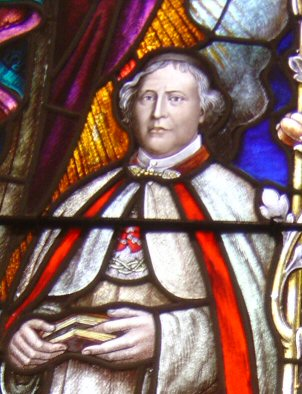
- Born: 1 March 1768; Coussay-les-Bois
- Died: 27 March 1837

Pierre Coudrin, SSCC (1 March 1768 – 1837) was a French religious priest. He was the founder of the Congregation of the Sacred Hearts of Jesus and Mary, a religious institute in the Roman Catholic Church known for its missionary work in Hawaii, Africa, Europe, Central America and the Pacific Islands.

== Life ==
Marie-Joseph-Pierre Coudrin was born on 1 March 1768, at Coussay-les-Bois, near Poitiers. His parents were farmers. His uncle was a parish priest in a neighboring village. Pierre spent his vacations with him during the years of his primary education, and his uncle prepared him for first communion. He completed his secondary studies in 1785 at Châtellerault, and at 17 years of age, entered the University of Poitiers.

He was only a deacon when the persecution, directed against the clergy, dispersed the students of the seminary of Poitiers, where he was being trained. Having learned that de Bonal, the Bishop of Clermont, was in Paris and would ordain him to priesthood, Coudrin set out for that city, and on 4 March 1792, was ordained in the Irish Seminary just as France was becoming embroiled in the Revolution. The ordination took place secretly in the library, because the revolutionaries had seized the chapel to hold their meetings.

== Vision ==
After ordination he returned to Coursay, but the violence of the persecution soon compelled him to go into hiding. Coudrin hid in an attic of the granary of the Chateau d'Usseau where he remained for six months. He reported that, during this time, he awoke one evening surrounded by an apparition of priests, brothers and nuns illuminated in albs. He took the vision to be a divine calling to establish a religious institute that would become the Congregation of the Sacred Hearts of Jesus and Mary. Coudrin quickly left the granary and traveled to Poitiers to begin an underground ministry, waiting for the right moment to start his group. During October of the same year, he also labored disguised in the Diocese of Tours.

During his underground ministry in 1794, Coudrin met Henriette Aymer de Chevalerie, a young aristocrat. She and her mother had been imprisoned for a time, accused of hiding a priest. She told Coudrin of a heaven-sent vision she had while in prison calling her to service to God. Coudrin and Henriette Aymer de Chevalerie shared with each other their visions of creating a religious institute in the midst of danger for Roman Catholics in France.

== Congregation of the Sacred Hearts of Jesus and Mary ==
Coudrin gathered around him a few companions, to whom he communicated his views to promote devotion to the Sacred Hearts of Jesus and of Mary, and who were also willing to assist him in his great work. On October 20, 1800 Henriette made her first vows with four companions. On Christmas night, 1800, Coudrin made his solemn vows, devoting himself entirely "to the love of the Sacred Hearts".

During the year 1805 Coudrin bought some dilapidated houses in the Rue Picpus in Paris, and there established himself with a few of his confreres. A college for the training of youths and a seminary were soon started. "The good Father", as his confreres used to call him, governed the congregation with tact and prudence, and in spite of many difficulties, his work prospered. Several new convents and colleges were founded and opened in various towns. Pope Pius VII approved the congregation in 1817 with the bull Pastor aeternus. The institute was composed of two branches of religious, one for men and the other for women.

In 1826, Coudrin was appointed vicar general of Gustave Maximilien Juste de Croÿ-Solre, Archbishop of Rouen. In 1829, he accompanied de Croy to Rome for the 1829 conclave.

The original members of the Congregation of the Sacred Hearts of Jesus and Mary founded new schools for poor children, seminaries to train the priesthood of the institute and parish missions throughout Europe. At the time of Coudrin's death in 1837, the Congregation of the Sacred Hearts of Jesus and Mary had 276 fathers and brothers and 1125 sisters.

In 2016, there were over 1500 in the congregation made up of priests, brothers and sisters and an increasing number of lay associate members in over 30 countries.

== Beatification process ==
The beatification process on Coudrin was opened in February 1925 and received the nihil obstat in April 1995. Coudrin's spiritual writings were approved by theologians on 12 March 1930. and again in 1952. The postulator of the cause is Andrzej Łukawski, SSCC.
