= Congregation of the Sacred Hearts of Jesus and Mary =

Catholic clerical religious congregation

- Latin: Congregatio Sacrorum Cordium Iesu et Mariae
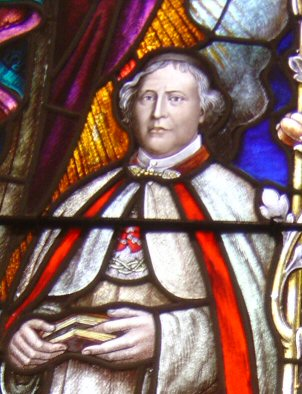
- Founder Pierre Coudrin depicted on a stained glass window in the Cathedral Basilica of Our Lady of Peace in Honolulu
- Abbreviation: SS.CC.
- Nickname: Picpus Fathers
- Formation: 1800; 226 years ago
- Founder: Fr. Marie-Joseph Coudrin, SS.CC.
- Type: Clerical religious congregation of Pontifical Right for men
- Headquarters: Via Rivarone 85, Rome, Italy
- Members: 653 members (includes 502 priests) as of 2020
- Superior General: Fr. Alberto Manuel Toutin Cataldo, SS.CC.
- Website: ssccpicpus.com

The Congregation of the Sacred Hearts of Jesus and Mary (Latin: Congregatio Sacrorum Cordium Iesu et Mariae) abbreviated SS.CC., is a Catholic clerical religious congregation of Pontifical Right for Sisters, priests and brothers. The congregation is also known as the Picpus because their first house was on the Rue de Picpus in Paris, France.

== History ==
=== French Revolution beginnings ===
The Congregation of the Sacred Hearts of Jesus and Mary arose amid the religious upheaval caused by the French Revolution. In March 1792, the Frenchman Pierre Coudrin was secretly ordained to the priesthood. The following May, Father Coudrin went into hiding in an attic of the granary of the Chateau d'Usseau and stayed confined there for six months to escape the government's persecution of the Catholic non-juring priests who refused to accept the Civil Constitution of the Clergy. One evening during his time in hiding, Coudrin had a vision of himself surrounded by a heavenly illuminated group of priests, brothers and sisters dressed in white robes, which he took as his calling to establish a religious institute that would be the Congregation of the Sacred Hearts of Jesus and Mary. Coudrin left the granary and began his underground ministry in Poitiers, waiting for the opportunity to start his group.

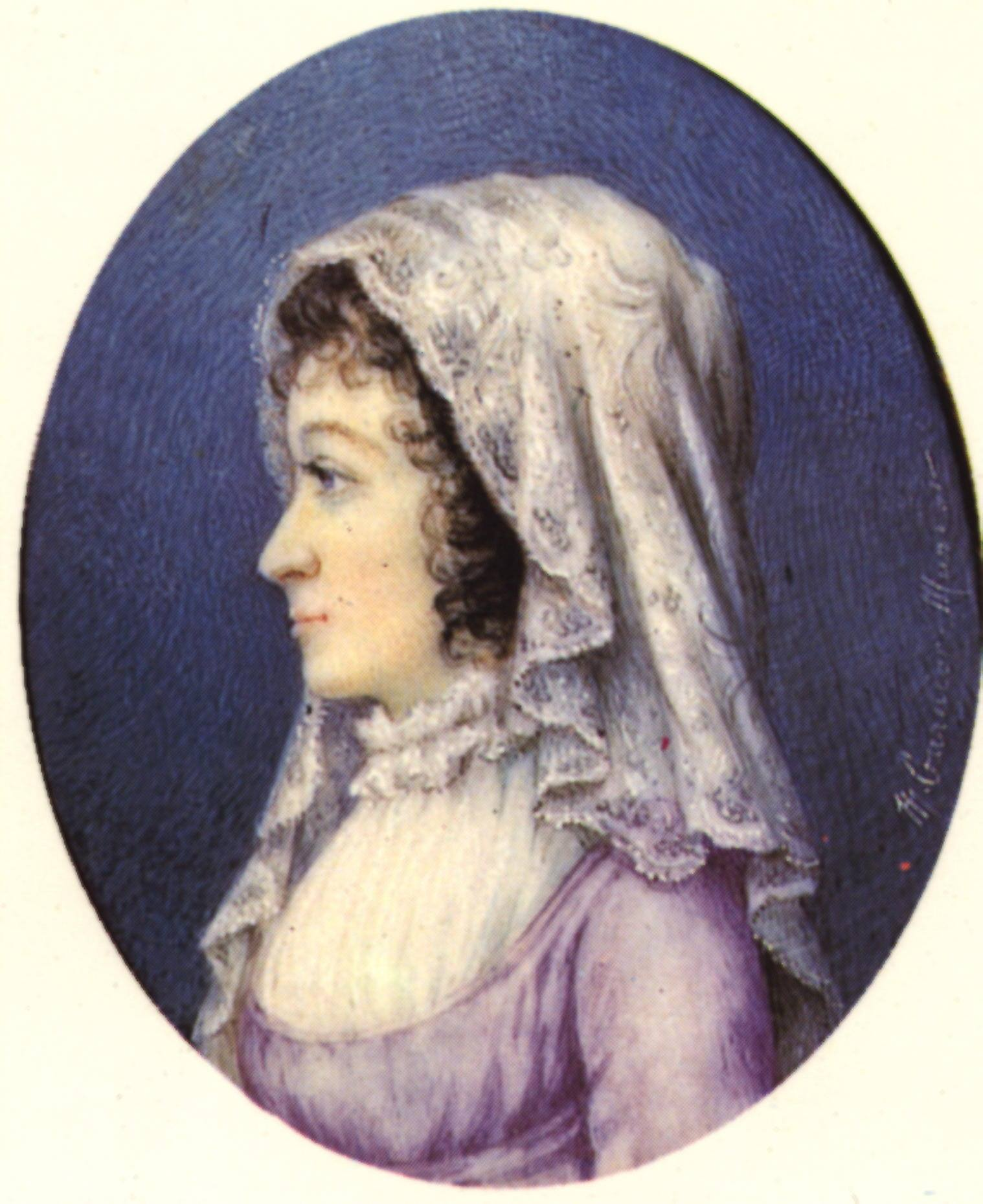
Servant of God Henriette Aymer de La Chevalerie

During his underground ministry in 1794, Coudrin met Henriette Aymer de Chevalerie. She had been imprisoned for hiding a priest. Upon her release, she told Coudrin of a vision she had while in prison calling her to the service of God. Coudrin and Henriette Aymer de Chevalerie shared with each other their visions of creating a religious institute in the midst of danger for Roman Catholics in France.

=== Establishing the Congregation ===
On Christmas Eve in 1800, despite knowing they could face the guillotine for their actions, Father Coudrin and Henriette Aymer de Chevalerie officially established the Congregation of the Sacred Hearts of Jesus and Mary.

In 1817, the Congregation was formally approved by the Pope as a single institute composed of a male and a female branch of religious and a lay branch.

The original members of the Congregation of the Sacred Hearts of Jesus and Mary founded new schools for poor children, seminaries to help grow the priesthood of their institute and parish missions throughout Europe. In 1825 the evangelization of the Sandwich Islands in the Pacific was entrusted by the Holy See to the Congregation of the Sacred Hearts, and the following year the first band of missionaries of the Sacred Hearts left France. At the time of Father Coudrin's death in 1837, the Congregation of the Sacred Hearts of Jesus and Mary had 276 priests and brothers and 1125 sisters.

In 1840 the Brothers founded a house in Louvain, Belgium. The Brothers settled in Spain (1880), the Netherlands (1892), England (1894) and the United States (1905).

The sisters, who concentrated their energies on education, went to Chile in 1838 and to Perú in 1848. They also started foundations in Honolulu in 1859 and Ecuador in 1862. Additional houses were founded in Spain (1881), Belgium (1894), England (1895), the Netherlands (1803) and the United States (1908).

The Congregation has been present in Ireland since 1948 and in the UK since 1956.

=== The Mission in the Pacific Islands ===
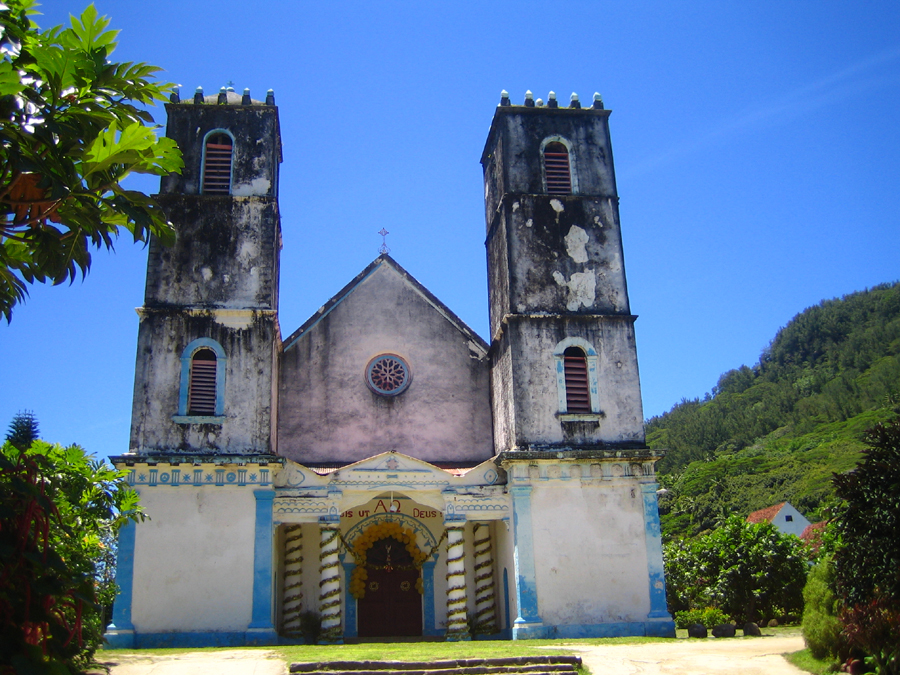
St. Michael's Cathedral in Rikitea before renovation in 2006

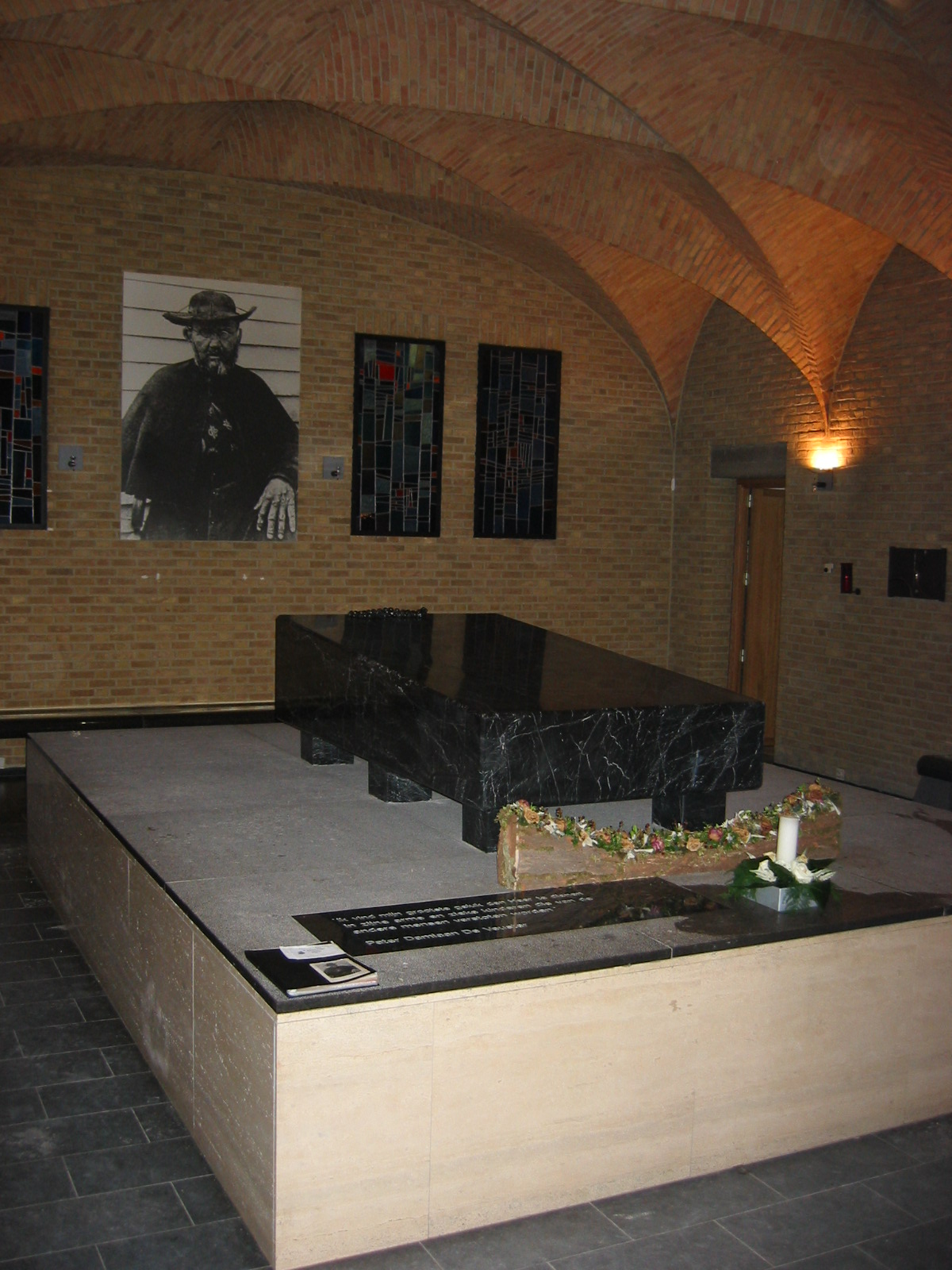
The grave of Saint Damien de Veuster in the crypt of the church of the Congregation of Sacred Hearts in Leuven

The religious institute set off on a new mission that would become their hallmark accomplishment. Teams of missionaries settled in the several Pacific Ocean islands to spread the Gospel, build churches, and evangelize new faithful.

The Congregation of the Sacred Hearts of Jesus and Mary was particularly successful in the Kingdom of Hawaii. They established what is now the Roman Catholic Diocese of Honolulu and built the Cathedral of Our Lady of Peace, the oldest Roman Catholic cathedral in continuous use in the United States. Hawaii's first six bishops, from 1833 to 1940, were members of the Congregation of the Sacred Hearts of Jesus and Mary. Other churches founded by the institute include Saint Joseph Catholic Church in Hilo and Maria Lanakila Catholic Church on Maui. Sacred Hearts Academy (K-12, girls) and St. Patrick's School (elementary, co-ed) in the Honolulu neighborhood of Kaimuki were both founded by the order.

=== Mission in the United States ===
In 1833 Reverends Edmundo Demellier, S.S.C.C. and Petithomme, S.S.C.C. began to minister to the Passamaquoddy people in Maine. The Congregation's first province in the United States was established 1846. In 1850 they established the Santa Inés Mission (Chumash), in Solvang, California.

== Saints, Blesseds, and other holy people ==
Saints

- Jozef (Damien) de Veuster (3 January 1840 – 15 April 1889), missionary to Hawaii, canonized on 11 October 2009

Blesseds

- Ladislas Radigue and 3 Companions (died 26 May 1871), Martyrs of the Paris Commune, beatified on 22 April 2023
- Teófilo Fernández de Legaria Goñi and 4 Companions (died 1936), Martyrs of the Spanish Civil War, beatified on 13 October 2013
- Hubertus (Eustáquio) van Lieshout (3 November 1890 – 30 August 1943), Dutch missionary to Brazil, beatified on 15 June 2006

Servants of God

- Henriette Aymer de la Chevalerie (8 November 1767 – 23 November 1834), founder of the Congregation, declared Servant of God in 2010
- Pierre-Marie-Joseph Coudrin (1 March 1768 – 27 March 1837), founder of the Congregation, declared Servant of God on 3 April 1995
- Mateo Crawley-Boevey Murga (18 November 1875 – 4 May 1960), Peruvian priest
- Esteban Gumucio Vives (3 September 1914 – 6 May 2001), Chilean priest
- Rolf Reichenbach (15 October 1931 – 11 September 2004), German priest

== Other notable members ==
- Henri Systermans
- Joseph Hendricks
- Honoré Laval
- François Caret
- Étienne Jérôme Rouchouze
- Louis Désiré Maigret
- Alexis Bachelot
- Florentin-Étienne Jaussen
