= List of Catholic priests =

- This is an incomplete list of Catholic priests.

== Latin & Eastern Catholic Churches ==
name	image	dates	description
Abrosima		341	Persian Christian priest and martyr.
Abraham of Arrazd		5th century	An Armenian priest and a disciple of the Leontine martyrs.
Abraham Armand		before 1827- after 1827	One of the first Catholic missionaries to arrive in the Kingdom of Hawaii in 1827.
Abdisho		298-345	A member of the Church of the East, was a deacon and martyr.
Absadah		300 -	Priest and martyr of the early 4th century.
Abram Joseph Ryan		February 5, 1838 – April 22, 1886	American poet, Catholic newspaper editor, orator, and former Vincentian.
Abraham a Sancta Clara		July 2, 1644 – December 1, 1709	A Catholic preacher in Austria.
Abraham Kidunaia		between c. 290-296-between c. 360–366	a Syriac Christian hermit and priest. He is venerated as a saint in Catholicism, Eastern Orthodoxy and Oriental Orthodoxy.
Acacius of Sebaste		3rd century - 304	4th-century Christian priest and hieromartyr who lived in Sebaste, Armenia, during the Diocletianic Persecution.
Adamnán of Iona		624 – 704	An abbot of Iona Abbey (r. 679–704), hagiographer, statesman, canon jurist, and saint. He was the author of the Life of Columba (Latin: Vita Columbae), probably written between 697 and 700.
Æthelwold of Farne		7th century	A late 7th-century hermit and priest who lived on Inner Farne, off the coast of the English county of Northumberland.
Agapetus		6th century	A deacon of the church of Hagia Sophia at Constantinople (about 500). He was a reputed tutor of Justinian, and author of a series of exhortations in seventy-two short chapters addressed around 527 to Justinian (Patrologia Graecae, LXXXVI, 1153–86).
Agathangelus of Rome		312	Roman deacon and disciple of Clement of Ancyra, was a martyr during the reign of emperor Diocletian.
Alban of Mainz		4th century - 5th century	A Catholic priest, missionary, and martyr in the Late Roman Empire.
Aldred the Scribe		before and after 970	Tenth-century priest, otherwise known only as Aldred, who was a provost of the monastic community of St. Cuthbert at Chester-le-Street in 970.
Alexis Bachelot		22 February 1796 – 5 December 1837	French priest known for being the first Prefect Apostolic of the Sandwich Islands.
Alfred Magill Randolph		August 31, 1836 – April 6, 1918	The first bishop of Southern Virginia in The Episcopal Church.
Alger of Liège		1055-1131	A Belgian clergyman and canonist from Liège, author of several notable works.
Amabilis of Riom		475	A French saint. Sidonius Apollinaris brought Amabilis to serve at Clermont. He served as a cantor in the church of Saint Mary at Clermont and as a precentor at the cathedral of Clermont and then as a parish priest in Riom.
Amphibalus		25 June 304	Early Christian priest said to have converted Saint Alban to Christianity.
Antonio Vivaldi		4 March 1678 – 28 July 1741	Italian composer, virtuoso violinist and impresario of Baroque music.
Antipater of Bostra		5th century - late 5th century	A Greek prelate who served as Metropolitan bishop of Bostra in the Roman province of Arabia and was one of the foremost critics of Origen.
Andeolus		208	an alleged Christian missionary martyred in Gaul.
Anthimus of Rome		303	a Christian saint. His life is largely composed of legend. He is said to have been born in Bithynia.
Antipope Felix II		before 355 - 22 November 365	An archdeacon of Rome, was installed as Pope in 355 AD after the Emperor Constantius II banished the reigning Pope, Liberius, for refusing to subscribe to a sentence of condemnation against Saint Athanasius.
Athanasius of Alexandria		5th century	A presbyter of the church in that city, and a son of Isidora, the sister of Cyril of Alexandria.
Augustine of Canterbury		6th century – most likely 26 May 604	A Christian monk who became the first archbishop of Canterbury in the year 597. He is considered the "Apostle to the English".
Avitus of Braga		5th century	An early fifth-century literary priest of Braga Portugal, who travelled to consult with Augustine and attend the Council of Jerusalem in 415 that found against Pelagius.
Avitus I of Clermont		525 - 600	A Bishop of Clermont in the 6th century.
Beda Chang		1905 – November 11, 1951	Chinese Jesuit priest who was martyred after being tortured during a wave of persecution by the communist government.
St. Bracchio		576	A French abbot. Bracchio had been a Thuringian nobleman who had served in the court of Sigiswald of Clermont. Gregory of Tours writes that Bracchio's name meant “bear’s whelp” in the Germanic language.
Cælin		7th century	Chaplain and one of four brothers named by Bede as active in the early Anglo-Saxon Church. The others were Cedd, Chad, and Cynibil.
Caecilius of Elvira		1st century	a Christian missionary of the 1st century, during the Apostolic Age.
Caesarius of Terracina		3rd century	a deacon of Africa, martyred at Terracina in Italy.
Caius, Presbyter of Rome		3rd century	A Christian author who lived and wrote towards the beginning of the 3rd century.
Chandra Fernando		August 9, 1942 – June 6, 1988	A priest from the town of Baticaloa in minority Tamil-dominated eastern province of Sri Lanka. He was known for his human rights activism. He was assassinated by unknown men on June 6, 1988.
Chrysanthus and Daria		3rd century – 283.AD	Saints of the Early Christian period. Their names appear in the Martyrologium Hieronymianum, an early martyrs list, and a church in their honour was built over their reputed grave in Rome.
Chrysippus of Jerusalem		5th century	A Christian priest and ecclesiastical writer who was active during the middle of the 5th century. He is best known as an author of homiletic literature.
Coifi		7th century	A priest recorded by Bede in the Ecclesiastical History of the English People as having presided over the temple at Goodmanham in the Northumbria in 627.
Constantius of Lyon		480	A cleric from what is now the Auvergne in modern-day France, who wrote the Vita Germani, or Life of Germanus, a hagiography of Germanus of Auxerre.
Ctesiphon		1st century	Christian missionary of the 1st century, during the Apostolic Age. He evangelized the town of Bergi, Vergi(s), or Vergium, identified as Berja, and is said to have become its first bishop, but the Diocese of Vergi was probably only founded around 500.
Cristóbal Diatristán de Acuña		1597-1676	Spanish Jesuit missionary explorer.
Cuana of Kilcoonagh		6th century	An early Christian missionary active in the northeast of the parish of Ballymacward, County Galway, sometime around or after 500. He was the founder of the church at Kilcoonagh.
Cynibil		7th century	One of four Northumbrian brothers named by Bede as prominent in the early Anglo-Saxon Church. The others were Chad of Mercia, Cedd and Caelin.
Cynidr		6th century	A 6th-century Welsh Catholic pre-congregational saint of South Wales and first bishop of Glasbury, Powys, he was the son of St Gwladys, grandson of King Brychan.
Damien of Molokai		3 January 1840 – 15 April 1889	A Belgian missionary who traveled to Molokaʻi and died after contracting leprosy in December 1884 and died 5 years later.
Daniel Westermann		c. 1989 –	A Catholic priest of the Diocese of Lansing currently stationed at St. John Vianney Seminary in Minnesota.
Daniele Comboni		15 March 1831 – 10 October 1881	An Italian Catholic prelate who served as Vicar Apostolic of Central Africa from 1877 until his death in 1881. He worked in the missions in Africa and was the founder of both the Comboni Missionaries of the Heart of Jesus and the Comboni Missionary Sisters.
David Bauer		November 2, 1924 – November 9, 1988	Canadian ice hockey player and coach, educator and Catholic priest. He was a member of the Basilians, and established a program to develop players for the Canada men's national ice hockey team.
Desiderius Erasmus Roterodamus		28 October c. 1466 – 12 July 1536	Dutch Christian humanist, Catholic priest and theologian, educationalist, satirist, and philosopher.
Domingos Maubere		12 May 1952 – 16 May 2025	East Timorese Catholic priest and activist
Donal O'Sullivan		1890 – 5 July 1916	Irish priest and chaplain in the 1st Battalion Royal Irish Rifles killed during the Battle of the Somme.
Eddie Doherty		October 30, 1890 – May 4, 1975	An American newspaper reporter, author and Oscar-nominated screenwriter. Twice-widowed, he married once more to Catherine de Hueck Doherty, founder of the Madonna House Apostolate, and later was ordained a priest in the Melkite Greek Catholic Church.
Andzej Derdziuk		born 1962	Polish born priest of the Catholic Church, holding the title of Professor of Theological Sciences since September 2011
Edmond Kelly		1897 – 1955 (as priest)	Irish Military Chaplain during World War I and later Parish Priest in the Diocese of Cashel and Emly, where he constructed multiple new schools.
Elias of Palestine		3rd century	An early Christian martyr. A priest, Elias was one of four Christians who led Mass for the persecuted Christians condemned to work in the Palestinian quarries in the wake of the Diocletianic Persecution.
Elmer W. Heindl		June 14, 1910 – July 17, 2006	An American U.S. Army chaplain during the Second World War. Enlisting in 1942, Heindl served in the Pacific theater, including Guadalcanal, New Britain, Bougainville, Manila and the Philippines. He became one of the most highly decorated chaplains of the war.
Emmeran M. Bliemel		29 September 1831 – 31 August 1864	Benedictine Catholic priest who died in the Battle of Jonesborough during the American Civil War.
Eugippius		460 - 535	A disciple and the biographer of Saint Severinus of Noricum.
Eugene Mattioli		30 May 1931 -	An Italian missionary, who was the longest serving Catholic missionary in Arabia and completed 60 years of service in the Vicariate and retired on 30 June 2018. He is one of the people credited with establishing the presence of the Catholic Church in the Arabian Peninsula.
Euphrasius of Illiturgis		1st century	Christian missionary of the 1st century, during the Apostolic Age.
Eutyches of Constantinople		c. 380 – c. 456	A presbyter and archimandrite at Constantinople. He first came to notice in 431 at the First Council of Ephesus, for his vehement opposition to the teachings of Nestorius.
Felix, Fortunatus, and Achilleus		212	3rd-century Christian saints who suffered martyrdom during the reign of Caracalla. Felix, a priest, Fortunatus and Achilleus, both deacons, were sent by Irenaeus, to Valence, to convert the locals.
Félix Caballero		before 1812 - 1840	Dominican priest. He played an important part in the history of the missions of Baja California, and also the opening up of the route to Tucson, Arizona.
Frances Xaiver		7 April 1506 – 3 December 1552	a Catholic missionary and saint who co-founded the Society of Jesus and, as a representative of the Portuguese Empire, led the first Christian mission to Japan.
Francis Trasuns		October 16, 1864 – April 6, 1926	Latgalian priest, theologian and politician. He was a member of the State Duma of the Russian Empire (in 1906) and a member of the Latvian parliament (1922–1926).
Francisco Fernández Carvajal		1938 -	A Spanish Roman Catholic priest in the Opus Dei Prelature and author of several books.
Franz Justus Rarkowski		June 8, 1873 – February 9, 1950	The Catholic military bishop of Nazi Germany.
Gaius Vettius Aquilinus Juvencus		330	A Roman Christian poet from Hispania who wrote in Latin.
Geminus of Antioch		fl. c. AD 230–240	a Christian priest and writer of the early 3rd century AD.
Gennadius of Massilia		496	a 5th-century Christian priest, monk, and historian best-known work is De Viris Illustribus ("Of Famous Men"), a biography of over 90 contemporary significant Christians, which continued a work of the same name by Jerome.
Georg Joseph Kamel		12 April 1661 – 2 May 1706	Jesuit missionary, pharmacist and naturalist known for producing the first comprehensive accounts of Philippine flora and fauna and for introducing Philippine nature to the European learned world.
Georges Lemaître		17 July 1894 – 20 June 1966	Belgian physicist and Astronomer. Proposed what would become known as the Big Bang Theory.
Germanus of Granfelden		612 - 675	the first abbot of Moutier-Grandval Abbey and Swiss martyr.
Gregor Johann Mendel		20 July 1822 - 6 January 1884	Austrio-Czech Augustinian friar and founder of the modern science of genetics.
Heinrich Maier		16 February 1908 – 22 March 1945	An Austrian Roman Catholic priest, pedagogue, philosopher and a member of the Austrian resistance, who was executed as the last victim of Hitler's regime in Vienna.
Henry Cyril Dieckhoff		1869-1950	Russian Catholic priest and linguist.
Hesychius of Cazorla		1st century	Christian missionary of the 1st century, during the Apostolic Age. He evangelized the town of Carcere, Carteia, or Carcesi, identified as Cazorla, became its first bishop, and was martyred there by stoning at La Pedriza.
Hesychius of Jerusalem		450s -	A Christian priest and exegete, active during the first half of the fifth century.
Hilary the Deacon		355	A Sardinian deacon of the Roman church. In 355, along with Lucifer of Cagliari, Eusebius of Vercelli, and Pancratius, he was directed by Pope Liberius to plead for Athanasian orthodoxy before Constantius II at the Council of Milan.
Horacio Villamayor de la Costa		May 9, 1916 – March 20, 1977	A Filipino Jesuit priest, historian and academic. He was the first Filipino Provincial Superior of the Society of Jesus in the Philippines, and a recognized authority in Philippine and Asian culture and history.
Hugh O'Flaherty		28 February 1898 – 30 October 1963	Irish Catholic priest, a senior official of the Roman Curia and a significant figure in the Catholic resistance to Nazism. During the Second World War, O'Flaherty was responsible for saving 6,500 Allied soldiers and Jews. His ability to evade the traps set by the German Gestapo and Sicherheitsdienst (SD) Chief Herbert Kappler earned him the nickname "The Scarlet Pimpernel of the Vatican".
Huna of Thorney		7th century	A seventh century priest and hermit.
Indaletius		1st century	Christian missionary of the 1st century, during the Apostolic Age. He evangelized the town of Urci (today Pechina), near the present-day city of Almería, and became its first bishop. He may have been martyred at Urci.
Ignatius of Loyola		23 October 1491 – 31 July 1556	A Basque Spaniard Catholic priest and theologian, who, with six companions, founded the religious order of the Society of Jesus (Jesuits), and became its first Superior General, in Paris in 1541.
Ivan Mikhailovich Martinov		7 October 1821, – 26 April 1894,	Russian Jesuit priest. After his conversion to Catholicism and consequent exile, he placed his vast knowledge of Slavic culture at the service of a better understanding between the Russian Orthodox and Catholic Churches.
Ivan Sergeyevich Gagarin		1 August 1814 - 19 July 1882	Russian Jesuit, known also as Jean-Xavier after his conversion from Orthodoxy to Roman Catholicism.
Isaac Taylor Tichenor		November 11, 1825 – December 2, 1902	A pastor and a planter, was President of the Agricultural and Mechanical College of Alabama, now known as Auburn University, from 1872 to 1881.
Itō Mancio		1569 – 13 November 1612	A Japanese Jesuit, head of the Tenshō embassy; the first Japanese diplomatic mission to Europe, and a Catholic priest.
Jacob of Tsurtavi		5th century	A 5th-century Georgian religious writer and priest from Tsurtavi, then the major town of Gogarene and the Lower Iberia.
James, Azadanus and Abdicius		April 10, 380	Martyrs of the Christian Church. James was a priest and Azadanus and Abdicius deacons.
James Petigru Boyce		January 11, 1827 – December 28, 1888	An American pastor, theologian, professor, chaplain, and a principle founder of the Southern Baptist Theological Seminary.
James Edwin Coyle		March 23, 1873 – August 11, 1921	A Catholic priest who was murdered in Birmingham, Alabama, by a Ku Klux Klan member for performing an interracial marriage.
Jean de Mayol de Lupé		January 21, 1873 - June 28, 1955	French priest and military chaplain of the French Volunteer Legion, then of the SS Charlemagne Division during the Second World War.
Jean-Pierre Pernin		February 22, 1822 – October 9, 1909	a French Roman Catholic priest, who came to the United States in 1864 as a missionary, working in Illinois, Wisconsin, and Minnesota. As Catholic pastor of Peshtigo, Wisconsin, he survived the Peshtigo fire on October 8–9, 1871.
St. Jerome		c. 342–347 – 30 September 420	Early Christian priest, confessor, theologian, translator, and historian.
Jim Borst		3 August 1932 – 5 September 2018	a Dutch Roman Catholic missionary of Saint Joseph's Missionary Society of Mill Hill, commonly called Mill Hill Missionaries.
José Eduardo de Cárdenas		1765–1821	priest, theologist, politician, poet, Latin professor and writer of New Spain (now Mexico).
Josef Meinrad Bisig		2 September 1952 - ?	A Swiss traditionalist Catholic priest, and co-founder and first superior general of the Priestly Fraternity of Saint Peter. He was originally a member of the Society of Saint Pius X but left when founder Archbishop Marcel Lefebvre illicitly consecrated four bishops.
José María de Yermo y Parres		10 November 1851 – 20 September 1904	Mexican Roman Catholic priest and the founder of the Servants of the Sacred Heart of Jesus and of the Poor.
Johannes Czerski		12 May 1813 – 22 December 1893	A German clergyman, one of the founders of German Catholicism.
John J. Brown		June 16, 1948	An American Roman Catholic priest and educator. A Blackfoot man, he was the first full-blooded Native American ordained to the Catholic priesthood.
John the Deacon		500	A deacon in the Church of Rome during the pontificate of Pope Symmachus (498–514). He is known only from an epistle he wrote to a Senarius, a vir illustris who had asked him to explain aspects of Christian initiatory practice.
John Augustus Tolton		April 1, 1854 – July 9, 1897	African American who served as first openly Black Catholic priest in the United States, ordained in Rome in 1886. He was preceded by the Healy brothers, Catholic priests who passed as White.
John Francis Reuel Tolkien		16 November 1917 – 22 January 2003	An English Roman Catholic priest and the eldest son of J. R. R. Tolkien.
John Bannon		29 December 1829 - 14 July 1913	An Irish Catholic Jesuit priest who served as a Confederate chaplain during the American Civil War. He was renowned as an orator.
Fr. John M. Corridan		1911 - 1984	A Jesuit priest who fought against corruption and organized crime on the New York City waterfront. He was the inspiration for the character of "Father Barry" in the classic film On the Waterfront.
Joseph Raya
Julio César Grassi		born 14 August 1956	An Argentine Salesian priest who was active in charitable works in Argentina as well as being active in Argentine TV and radio. Beginning in the late 1990s, Grassi's public image began to fall apart amid accusations of rape and child sexual abuse. After escaping from an arrest warrant, he was captured in October 2002 and later sentenced to 17 years in prison on the sexual abuse counts plus another of fraud.
Justin the Confessor		269	a Christian martyr in the Roman Empire. He is honored as a saint by the Roman Catholic Church and Eastern Orthodox Church.
Kevin Thomas Kenney		December 29, 1959 - ?	An American bishop of the Roman Catholic Church. Currently an auxiliary bishop for the Archdiocese of Saint Paul and Minneapolis.
Landelin		625 – 686	A French nobleman and Deacon in Vaux, Bapaume.
Lawrence Zhang Wen-Chang		1920 – February 5, 2012	An Apostolic Administrator sent to the Laogai system by the People's Republic of China.
Laurence of Canterbury		? - 2 February 619	The second Archbishop of Canterbury, and member of the Gregorian mission sent from Italy to England to Christianise the Anglo-Saxons from their native Anglo-Saxon paganism.
Leucadius of Bayeux		6th century	The first bishop of Bayeux whose presence is attested.
Leopold Moczygemba		October 18, 1824 – February 23, 1891	A Polish priest and founder of the first Polish-American parish in Panna Maria and Bandera, Texas.
Leslie John Thomas Costello		February 16, 1928 – December 10, 2002	A founder of the Flying Fathers exhibition hockey team.
Liberatus of Carthage		6th century	An archdeacon and the author of an important history of the Nestorian and Monophysite controversies in the 5th- and 6th-century Christian Church.
Loup de Bayeux		before 440 - 474	Saint Loup or sometimes saint Leu was a bishop of Bayeux between 440 and 470.
Lubentius		c. 300 – c. 370	S Christian saint, venerated by the Catholic Church. A patron saint of the boatmen on the River Lahn.
Lu Zhengxiang		12 June 1871 - 15 January 1949	Chinese diplomat and a Roman Catholic priest and monk. He was twice Premier of the Republic of China and led his country's delegation at the Paris Peace Conference of 1919.
Malchion		272	a Church Father and presbyter of Antioch during the reigns of Emperors Claudius II and Aurelian, was a well-known rhetorician most notable for his key role in the 272 AD deposition of the heretical bishop of Antioch, Paul of Samosata.
Manveus of Bayeux		480	Wealthy Frenchman and the sixth bishop of Bayeux.
Martin Adolf Bormann		14 April 1930 – 11 March 2013	Son of Nazi Martin Bormann who works against Holocaust denial.
Martin Stanislaus Brennan		July 23, 1845 – October 3, 1927	An American Roman Catholic priest and scientist known for writing books about religion and science. Brennan wrote science textbooks for children as well as general interest books on scientific topics and was a popular lecturer in Europe and Palestine as well as in his hometown, St. Louis, Missouri.
Mary Bastian		1948 – 6 January 1985	Sri Lankan Tamil human rights activist and Catholic priest who was shot and killed along with 10 other civilians on January 6, 1985, during the Sri Lankan Civil War, allegedly by the Sri Lankan Army.
Martin Luther		10 November 1483 – 18 February 1546	A German priest, theologian, author, hymnwriter, professor, Augustinian friar, and founder of Lutheranism.
Maurontius of Douai		634 – May 5, 702	A French nobleman and Benedictine abbot. His parents were Rictrude and Adalbard.
Maximin Alff		24 July 1866 – 17 May 1923	German reverend and a member of the Congregation of the Sacred Hearts of Jesus and Mary in 1887, He was for a time professor of philosophy at Miranda de Ebro, Spain. He came to Honolulu from Spain, arriving on 25 October 1894.
Maximilian Kolbe		8 January 1894 – 14 August 1941	Conventual Franciscan friar who was murdered at Auschwitz concentration camp.
Mellitus		500s - 24 April 624	The first bishop of London in the Saxon period, the third archbishop of Canterbury, and a member of the Gregorian mission sent to England to convert the Anglo-Saxons from their native paganism to Christianity.
Michael James Nazir-Ali		19 August 1949 - ?	A Pakistani-born British Roman Catholic priest and former Anglican bishop. He served as the 106th Bishop of Rochester from 1994 to 2009 and, before that, as Bishop of Raiwind in Pakistan. He is currently the director of the Oxford Centre for Training, Research, Advocacy and Dialogue.
Mike Schmitz		December 14, 1974 - ?	American Catholic priest, speaker, author, and podcaster.
Miguel Zugastegui		14 February 1773 – 3 May 1809	Criollo Franciscan friar and revolutionary, who took part in early stages of the independence movement of Mexico. He is honored in Mexico as a martyr of the struggle for independence from Spain.
Musaeus of Marseilles		c. 450	A priest from Massilia. According to Gennadius, he died "during the reign of Leo and Majorian", between 457 and 461. We know very little about his life.
Mychal Fallon Judge		May 11, 1933 – September 11, 2001	An American Franciscan friar and Catholic priest who served as a chaplain to the New York City Fire Department. While serving in that capacity, he was killed, becoming the first certified fatality of the September 11 attacks.
Nicholas Kao Se Tseien		15 January 1897 - 11 December 2007	Chinese Trappist priest in Hong Kong who was the oldest-living Catholic priest and also the oldest person ever to have had a cataract operation.
Nicolas Aubry		before 1604 - after 1611	French priest who accompanied Pierre Dugua, Sieur de Monts to Acadia in 1604.
Nimatullah Kassab		1808 – 14 December 1858	A Lebanese monk, priest and scholar of the Maronite Church. He has been declared a saint by the Catholic Church.
Noetus		230	presbyter of the church of Asia Minor about AD 230. He was a native of Smyrna, he became a prominent representative of the particular type of Christology now called modalistic monarchianism or patripassianism.
Pablo de Anda Padilla		July 5, 1830 – June 29, 1904	Catholic priest and founder of the Minim Daughters of Mary Immaculate.
Patroclus of Bourges		496–576	A Merovingian ascetic, who was a native of the province of Berry, France. A deacon at Bourges, he withdrew to become a hermit.
Paulus Orosius		c. 375/385 – c. 420 AD	A Roman priest, historian and theologian, and a student of Augustine of Hippo.
Paulinus of Milan		411 - 422	The notary of Ambrose of Milan, and his biographer. His work is the only life of Ambrose based on a contemporary account, and was written at the request of Augustine of Hippo.
Peter Matthias Abbelen		8 August 1843 – 24 August 1917	The Roman Catholic vicar general of the Milwaukee Archdiocese and later the spiritual director for the School Sisters of Notre Dame in Milwaukee.
Peter Whelan		1802 – February 6, 1871	An Irish-born Catholic priest who was a chaplain for both Confederate troops and Union prisoners of war during the American Civil War. Whelan previously served as a missionary in North Carolina and pastor of Georgia's first Catholic parish, and twice served as administrator of the entire Diocese of Savannah.
Photinus of Thessalonica		5th century	A disciple of Acacius, Patriarch of Constantinople and a deacon in the Church.
Pierre Coudrin		1 March 1768 – 1837	A French religious priest. He was the founder of the Congregation of the Sacred Hearts of Jesus and Mary, a religious institute in the Roman Catholic Church known for its missionary work in Hawaii, Africa, Europe, Central America and the Pacific Islands.
Pusai, Shemon bar Sabbae and Chusdazat		344	A group of Christian priest and bishops and companion in martyrdom with Simeon Barsabae and others.
Robert Barron		November 19, 1959 -	American prelate of the Catholic Church who has served as bishop of the Diocese of Winona–Rochester since 2022.
Romanus of Condat		390 - 460	A saint of the fifth century. At the age of thirty five, he decided to live as a hermit in the area of Condat. His younger brother Lupicinus followed him there. They became leaders of a community of monks that included Eugendus.
Sabellius		215	third-century priest and theologian who most likely taught in Rome, but may have been a North African from Libya.
Sergius of Reshaina		536	A physician and priest during the 6th century. He is best known for translating medical works from Greek to Syriac, which were eventually, during the Abbasid Caliphate of the late 8th- & 9th century, translated into Arabic.
Sigo		580	A Burgundian abbot of the sixth century. He is a saint of the Roman Catholic Church, an Orthodox saint and the reputed founder of the Abbey of Saint-Seine and in the Orthodox Church.
Solanus Casey		November 25, 1870 – July 31, 1957	American religious priest of the Order of Friars Minor Capuchin and Declared venerable by Pope John Paul II.
Stephen of Ripon		7th century - 8th century	The author of the eighth-century hagiographic text Vita Sancti Wilfrithi ("Life of Saint Wilfrid").
Telfair Hodgson		March 14, 1840 – September 11, 1893	An American Episcopal priest and academic administrator. He was the dean of the Theological Department at Sewanee: The University of the South from 1878 to 1893, and vice chancellor from 1879 to 1890. He was a co-founder and the managing editor of The Sewanee Review.
Tissa Balasuriya		August 29, 1924 – January 17, 2013	Sri Lankan Roman Catholic priest and theologian. He was educated at St Patrick's College, Jaffna.
Torquatus of Acci		1st century	Christian missionary of the 1st century, during the Apostolic Age. He evangelized the town of Acci, identified as Guadix, and became its first bishop.
Theodoret		October 22, 362	A Greek-speaking Syrian Christian priest who died a martyr in Antioch during the reign of Emperor Julian the Apostate.
Thomas Aquinas		c. 1225 – 7 March 1274	Italian Dominican friar and priest, the foremost Scholastic thinker, as well one of the most influential philosophers and theologians in the Western tradition. He was from the county of Aquino in the Kingdom of Sicily.
Thomas Bloomer Balch		February 28, 1793 - February 14, 1878	A Presbyterian pastor during the American Civil War.
Thomas Roussel Davids Byles		26 February 1870 – 15 April 1912	An English Catholic priest who was a passenger aboard the RMS Titanic on its maiden voyage when it sank after striking an iceberg during the night of 14–15 April 1912. He was reported as being amidst the throng of trapped passengers on the ship's rear deck in its final moments of descent, audibly praying.
Valère de Langres		22 October 411	Archdeacon of Langres, was arrested by a group of Vandals led by a man named Chrocus, beaten and beheaded.
Vigilantius		370 - 400	A Christian priest and presbyter.
Vincent Robert Capodanno Jr.		February 13, 1929 – September 4, 1967	A Catholic priest and Maryknoll Missioner killed in action while serving as a Navy chaplain with a Marine Corps infantry unit during the Vietnam War.
Vinkenti Peev		11 November 1873 - March 2, 1941	A Bulgarian Catholic priest, Capuchin friar and Vicar Apostolic of the Roman Catholic Diocese of Sofia and Plovdiv.
Vladimir Sergeyvich Pecherin		27 June 1807 – 28 April 1885	Russian nihilist, Romantic poet, and Classicist, who later became a Roman Catholic priest in 19th-century Ireland.
Walter Joseph Ciszek		November 4, 1904 – December 8, 1984	A Polish-American Jesuit priest of the Russian Greek Catholic Church who clandestinely conducted missionary work in the Soviet Union between 1939 and 1963.
Waningus		683	A Merovingian count and royal official under Clotaire III. He assisted Wandrille in establishing Fontenelle Abbey, and later founded Fécamp Abbey. He is recognized as a Christian saint.
William Joseph Chaminade		8 April 1761 – 22 January 1850	A French Catholic priest who survived persecution during the French Revolution and later founded the Society of Mary, usually called the Marianists, in 1817. He was beatified by Pope John Paul II on 3 September 2000.
Wolfgang Rösch		25 August 1959 -	A German Catholic priest. He was from 2010 to 2013 Dean of Wiesbaden at the parish St. Bonifatius.
Youakim Moubarac		July 20, 1924 – May 24, 1995	An Islamologist, an Arabist and a disciple of the Orientalist Louis Massignon and of philosopher Louis Gardet and a Maronite priest.

Piero Folli – Italian antifascist parish priest

Joseph Freinademetz – Missionary to China, canonized

Mariano Gagnon – Franciscan friar and author who helped indigenous people resist the Shining Path in Peru

Georg Gänswein – Secretary to Pope Benedict XVI

Augustine Geve – Solomon Islands Catholic priest and politician, murdered in 2002

Lionel Groulx – French Canadian Nationalist

Jacques Hamel – Priest killed in the 2016 Normandy church attack.

Ignatius of Loyola – Founder of the Society of Jesus

Saint Arnold Janssen – Missionary

Marcelline Jayakody, Sri Lankan Sinhala author, composer of hymns, author, journalist

Francis Kilcoyne (died 1985) – President of Brooklyn College

Georges-Henri Lévesque – Sociologist

Gerard Timoner III – The current master of the Dominican Order

Eustáquio van Lieshout – Missionary in Brazil

Michael J. McGivney – Founder of the Knights of Columbus

Claudio Monteverdi – Italian composer

Columba Murphy – Involved in gaining an Edict of Toleration for Hawaiian Catholics

Nemesi Marqués Oste – Rector in Andorra and political figure there

William Pope – One of John Henry Newman's converts: seceded from Anglicanism to the Church of Rome in 1853

Jean-Baptiste de La Salle – A founder of the Institute of the Brothers of the Christian Schools

Mihalj Šilobod Bolšić – Roman Catholic priest, mathematician, writer, and musical theorist primarily known for writing the first Croatian arithmetic textbook Arithmatika Horvatzka (published in Zagreb, 1758)

David Michael Moses – American priest and musician

Thomas Joseph White – American priest and bluegrass musician.

Ghevont Alishan – Priest of the Armenian Catholic Church who designed Armenia's first modern flag.

Ed Evanko – Actor who became a Ukrainian Catholic priest.

Louis Massignon – Scholar of Islam who transferred to the Melkite Greek Catholic Church after converting to Catholicism and later became a priest.

Alphonse Mingana – Chaldean Catholic Church priest and Orientalist.

Alphonse Mingana – Chaldean Catholic Church priest and Orientalist.

== Catholic exorcists ==
- Father Ernst Alt
- Father Candido Amantini
- Gabriele Amorth – Founder of the International Association of Exorcists
- Father Raymond J. Bishop
- William S. Bowdern – Participated in an exorcism of Roland Doe in 1949. The incident became the basis of William Peter Blatty's novel The Exorcist.
- Jeremy Davies
- Father Angelo Fantoni
- Father Jose Antonio Fortea
- Giancarlo Gramolazzo – President of the International Association of Exorcists until his death in 2010
- Father Alfred Kunz
- Father Matteo La Grua
- James J. LeBar – New York exorcist consulted with regards to films
- Malachi Martin – Writer on unusual subjects as well as an exorcist
- Father Theophilus Riesinger
- Father Rosario Stroscio

== See also ==
- Lists of Roman Catholics
