= List of bridges in Syria =

== Historical and architectural interest bridges ==
	Name	Arabic	Distinction	Length	Type	Carries Crosses	Opened	Location	Governorate	Ref.
1	Roman Bridge over the Sabun River		Leads to the ancient city of Cyrrhus		Masonry; 3 arches	Sabun River	2nd century	Dayr Şawwān; 36°44′20.9″N 36°58′20.8″E	Aleppo	
2	Roman Bridge over the Afrin River		Leads to the ancient city of Cyrrhus		Masonry; 6 arches	Afrin River	2nd century	Dayr Şawwān; 36°43′45.3″N 36°58′48.8″E	Aleppo	
3	Roman Bridge over the Orontes River				Masonry; 10 arches	Orontes River		Mahardah; 35°16′13.7″N 36°33′54.0″E	Hama	
4	Ain Diwar Bridge				Masonry; 1 arch remaining	Out of order Tigris		Ain Diwar; 37°18′52.2″N 42°12′56.9″E	Hasakah	
5	Kharaba Bridge				Masonry; 2 arches	Road 109; Wadi Zeidi		Bosra; 32°33′04.4″N 36°26′00.0″E	Daraa	
6	Gemarrin Bridge				Masonry; 3 arches	Out of order Wadi Zeidi		Bosra; 32°32′57.8″N 36°29′45.7″E	Daraa	
7	Bridge at Nimreh			25 m (82 ft)	Masonry; 1 arches	Out of order Wadi al-Liwa		Shahba; 32°50′00.0″N 36°41′30.0″E	Suwayda	
8	Citadel of Aleppo Fortified Gateway		Leads to the Citadel of Aleppo		Masonry; 7 arches	Footbridge		Aleppo; 36°11′53.7″N 37°09′42.5″E	Aleppo	

== Major bridges ==
	Name	Arabic	Span	Length	Type	Carries Crosses	Opened	Location	Governorate	Ref.
1	Deir ez-Zor suspension bridge destroyed in 2013	جسر دير الزور المعلق	112 m (367 ft) (x3)	500 m (1,600 ft)	Suspension; 4 pylons	Footbridge; Euphrates	1926	Deir ez-Zor; 35°20′42.2″N 40°09′04.2″E	Deir ez-Zor	
2	Haradara Bridge				Truss; Steel	Berlin–Baghdad railway		Memelan; 36°42′36.9″N 36°38′27.8″E	Aleppo	
3	Al-Rastan bridge	جسر_الرستن		600 m (2,000 ft)		M5 Motorway (Syria); Orontes River		Al-Rastan	Homs	

== See also ==
- Transport in Syria
- List of Roman bridges
