= Saint-Vallier =

Saint-Vallier may refer to:

== Places ==
=== France ===
- Saint-Vallier, Charente, in the Charente département
- Saint-Vallier, Drôme, in the Drôme département
- Saint-Vallier, Saône-et-Loire, in the Saône-et-Loire département
- Saint-Vallier, Vosges, in the Vosges département
- Saint-Vallier-de-Thiey, in the Alpes-Maritimes département
- Saint-Vallier-sur-Marne, in the Haute-Marne département

=== Quebec ===
- Saint-Vallier, Quebec, a municipality in Bellechasse Regional County Municipality

== People ==
- Valère de Langres (died 411), Christian saint also known as Vallier de Langres
- Jean-Baptiste de La Croix de Chevrières de Saint-Vallier (1653–1727), second bishop of Quebec
