= Shaqqa =

Town in Syria

Shaqqa شَقَّا
- Town
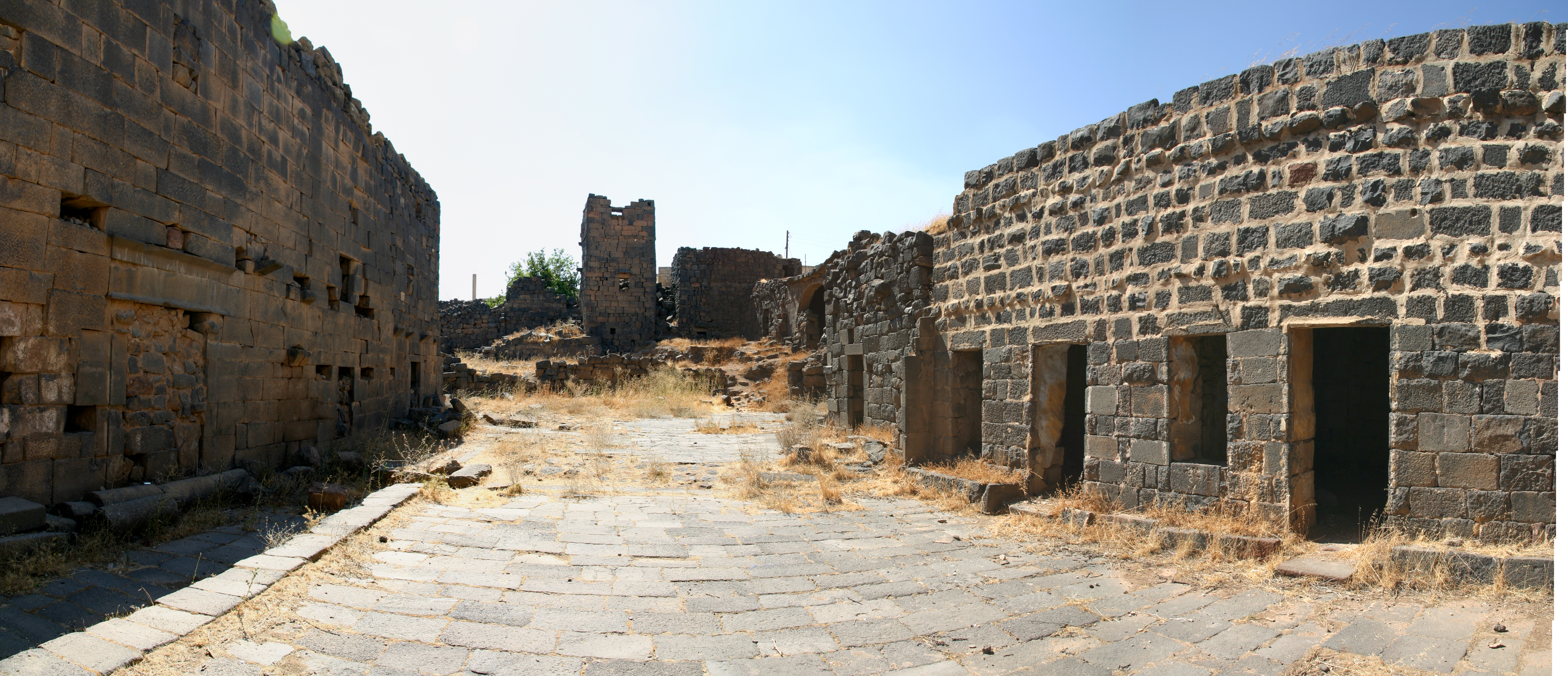
- Al-Qaysariye residential palace in Shaqqa

- Location in Syria
- Coordinates: 32°53′50″N 36°41′53″E
- Country: Syria
- Governorate: Suwayda
- District: Shahba
- Subdistrict: Shaqqa
- Elevation: 1,070 m (3,510 ft)

Population (2004 Census)
  - Total: 5,116

Shaqqa or Shakka (Arabic: شَقَّا, romanized: Šaqqā) is a Syrian town in Suwayda Governorate in southern Syria. The Druze migrated to the region from Mount Lebanon starting from the 18th century.

In ancient times it was known as Saccaea (transliterated also as Sakkaia). In AD 287, it was given the rank of a city and the name Maximianopolis. Since it was situated in the Roman province of Arabia, it is distinguished from other cities by being called Maximianopolis in Arabia. The town had a population of 5,116 in the 2004 census. The town's inhabitants are predominantly Druze, while Christians and Sunni Muslim Bedouins represent a minority.

== Location and architectural remains ==
Shaqqa is situated in the northern fringes of Jabal al-Druze volcanic plateau at 1070 metres above sea level, 7 kilometres east of Shahba and about 25 kilometres north of Suwayda, the capital of the governatorate.

The ancient remains include several dwellings rich adorned both architecturally and by carvings. In addition it has:

- The enormous Al-Qaysariye, generally interpreted as the residence of the Roman governors, but more probably a small forum linked with a vast basilical hall, which was worked on in the 3rd century. It has a number of rooms and halls with floral decorations.
- A Roman civil basilica, later transformed into a church dedicated to Saint George. It is believed that this church is the oldest one dedicated to the martyr Saint George on the basis of a Greek inscription naming the building for the "holy and triumphant" martyr George. It is dated to either AD 368 or 197.
- A kalybe, an old architectural style of temples typical for the Roman era southern Syria.

Maximianopolis in Arabia, doubtless the seat of a Roman garrison, was a colonia, the highest rank of city in the empire. It employed a calendar era that counted the years from that of Maximian's accession to the imperial throne (AD 286). An inscription mentions a temple of Zeus Megistos, and another bearing an epigram about the philosopher Proclus is a witness to local literary culture.

== Bishopric ==
In the 5th century Maximianopolis was an episcopal see, as indicated by the participation of its bishop Severus as a signatory of the Council of Chalcedon in 451. An inscription of 594 speaks of the local bishop, named Tiberinus, having erected a martyrium of Saint George and other martyrs. Another inscription mentions a Bishop Peter.

The bishopric of Maximianopolis in Arabia is included in the Catholic Church's list of titular sees. In the 19th century it was mistakenly called "Maximopolis", until corrected in 1885. Some sources of the same period proposed identification of Maximianopolis in Arabia with the town of Sheikh Miskin.

=== Ottoman era ===
In 1838 Shuka was noted by Eli Smith as being located in Jabal Hauran, and inhabited by Druze and Christians.

== Demographics ==
In 2011, the Melkite Greek Catholic Church had approximately 100 believers.

== Religious buildings ==
- St. Takla Greek Orthodox Church
- St. Yousef (St. Joseph) Melkite Greek Catholic Church
- Maqam Azran (Druze Shrine)

== See also ==
- Druze in Syria
- Christians in Syria
- Maximianopolis (disambiguation)

== Bibliography ==
- Robinson, E.; Smith, E. (1841). Biblical Researches in Palestine, Mount Sinai and Arabia Petraea: A Journal of Travels in the year 1838. Vol. 3. Boston: Crocker & Brewster.
