= Bridge at Nimreh =

- Coordinates: 32°50′00″N 36°41′30″E
- Crosses: Wadi al-Liwa
- Locale: Close to Shahba, Syria

Characteristics
- Design: Transversal arch bridge
- Material: Basalt blocks
- Total length: 25 m
- Width: 4.52 m
- Longest span: 6.73 m
- No. of spans: 1
- Clearance below: 3.60 m

History
- Construction end: 3rd or 4th century AD

Location
- Interactive map of Bridge at Nimreh

The Bridge at Nimreh is a Roman bridge in the vicinity of Shahba (ancient Philippopolis), Syria, dating to the 3rd or 4th century AD. Its transversal arch construction derives from old building traditions of the Hauran region and is arguably unique in Roman bridge building.

== Road network of the Hauran ==
The Bridge at Nimreh is located in the Hauran (ancient name: Auranitis), a mountainous volcanic region c. 80 km southeast from Damascus in the transitional zone between agricultural land and the desert. Due to fertile soils and sufficient rainfalls, the area yielded in Roman times particularly high returns, which could be transported on the extensive Roman road network. The Hauran lay at the junction of several long distance trade routes: the inland trade route between Petra, Damascus and Aleppo went right through the main emporium Bostra, while the trans-Arabian caravan route and the road to Palmyra, the later Strata Diocletiana, touched the north respectively south of the region.

After the annexation by emperor Trajan in 106 AD, the infrastructure of the newly established Provincia Arabia was greatly expanded by the construction of Roman forts and military roads to ward off nomadic incursions; in Bostra the Legio III Cyrenaica was stationed. The rugged terrain, with many wadis crisscrossing it, made necessary the construction of solid bridges, another two of which have survived to this day: the Gemarrin Bridge and the Kharaba Bridge.

== Construction ==
The bridge is situated 10 km southeast from Shahba, close to the modern road at the foot of the mountain village Nimreh, which was known in the Onomastikon of Eusebius by the name Namara and regarded as an important place (vicus grandis). Here, the bridge crosses the Wadi al-Liwa almost right-angled, making a small bend of 120° at its western end; a slightly elevated causeway continues for about 100 m before trailing off. The bridge is 25 m long, with the eastern section covering the larger part (15 m). Its width of 4.52 m corresponds exactly to that of the Kharaba Bridge. The span of its single arch is 6.73 m, with a rise of 3.10 m, resulting in a slightly less pronounced profile (c. 160°) than the typical Roman semi-circular arch (180°); the overall height from the riverbed to the apex of the arch is reported as 3.60 m.

The vault was made of three parallel, transversal arches standing at intervals of 1.20 m; the arches were built of 60 cm long, 30 cm wide and just as high ashlar, while the spaces in between are covered with longish basalt blocks. This design principle – transversal arches with lintels – seems to be unique among Roman bridges. It also appears in the Hauran in roof constructions of late antique basilicas, and the early Christian church in Nimreh, indicating a construction date in the 3rd or 4th century AD. Possibly, the bridge was built in the 3rd century AD, when the region prospered, culminating in a large building program which emperor Philippus Arabs (r. 244–249 AD) initiated for his home town Shahba, then Philippopolis. The practice of using transversal arches for vaulting large chambers was continued in the Hauran until the early 20th century.

Presumably, the bridge was built directly onto the solid stone. Its almost unadorned masonry walls consist of rectangular, roughly smoothed basalt blocks of varying size without mortar (opus quasi-quadratum). Since Roman bridges rarely featured basalt, its use is undoubtedly due to the availability of the material in situ. The spandrel walls on both sides are broken up, revealing the interior filling of stone, sand and earth. The pavement, parts of which are well preserved, consists of large, smoothed basalt stones.

== See also ==
- List of Roman bridges
- Roman architecture
- Roman engineering

== Sources ==
- Kissel, Theodor; Stoll, Oliver (2000), "Die Brücke bei Nimreh. Ein Zeugnis römischer Verkehrspolitik im Hauran, Syrien", Antike Welt, vol. 31, no. 2, pp. 109–125
