= Maximianopolis =

Maximianopolis or Maximianoupolis (Ancient Greek: Μαξιμιανόπολις or Μαξιμιανούπολις, "city of Maximianus") can refer to the following ancient cities, named after the Roman emperor Maximian:

- Maximianopolis in Arabia, in modern Syria
- Maximianopolis (Osrhoene), in modern Turkey
- Maximianopolis (Palestine), in modern Israel
- Maximianopolis (Pamphylia), in modern Turkey
- Maximianopolis in Rhodope, in modern Greece
- Maximianopolis (Thebaid), in modern Egypt

== See also ==
- Maximianus (disambiguation)
- Maximiana, Maximianae
- Maximopolis (various cities)
