= Maximin =

Maximin or Maximinus or similar may refer to:

== People ==
- Maximinus Thrax (173–238), Roman emperor, also known as Maximinus I
- Maximinus II (270–313), Roman emperor, also known as Maximinus Daia
- Gaius Julius Verus Maximus (died 238; 217/220–238), also incorrectly known as Maximinus the Younger, Caesar of Rome, son of Maximinus I
- Saint Maximin of Trier (died 346), French-born bishop of Trier, Germany
- Saint Maximinus of Aix (Maximin d'Aix), traditionally named as the first bishop of Aix and a figure in the legend of Mary Magdalene, often conflated in the Middle Ages with Maximin of Trier
- Maximinus (praetorian prefect) (fl. 4th century), Roman officer and barrister
- Maximinus (diplomat) (fl. 5th century), Byzantine ambassador to Attila the Hun
- Saint Mesmin or Maximin (died 520), French saint
- Maximin Isnard (1755–1825), French revolutionary
- Maximin Giraud (1835–1875), French Marian visionary
- Maximilian Kronberger (1888–1904), known as Maximin, German poet
- Maximino Ávila Camacho (1891–1945), Mexican revolutionary general (brother of President Camacho)
- Rayo de Jalisco Sr. (Máximino "Max" Linares Moreno, 1932–2018), former Mexican luchador
- Max León (Maximino León Molino, born 1950), Mexican former baseball pitcher
- Maximin Coia (born 1983), French pair skater
- Daniel Maximin (born 1947), Guadeloupean writer
- Maximin Alff (1866–1927), reverend in the Congregation of the Sacred Hearts of Jesus and Mary
- Maximin de Bompart (1698–1773), French naval officer, colonial administrator, and Governor of Martinique
- Juventinus and Maximinus (died 363), members of the imperial guard of Emperor Julian
- Mariani Maximin (1914–2011), politician from Guadeloupe

== Other uses ==
- Maximin (decision theory), also known as minimax, a strategy to maximize the minimum possible payback
- Maximin (philosophy), a principle regarding how justice relates to inequality

== See also ==
- Minimax
- Maximianus (disambiguation)
- Saint-Maximin (disambiguation)
