= Kalybe (temple) =

Roman imperial cult temple in the East

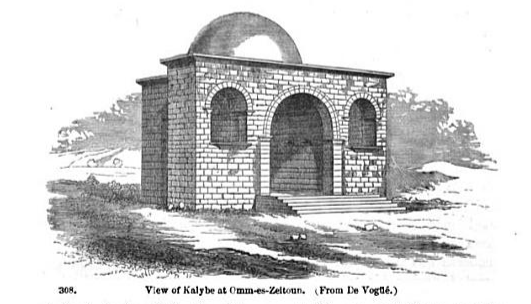
The kalybe in Umm Iz-Zetum from 282 AD, dedicated to the Emperor Probus

A kalybe (Ancient Greek: καλὑβη; Arabic: القليب, romanized: ālqlyb) is a type of temple found in the eastern Roman Empire dating from the 1st century and after. They were intended to serve as a "public facade or stage-setting, solely for the display of statuary." "[T]hey were essentially stage-sets for ritual enacted in front of them." The kalybe has been associated with the Roman imperial cult.

The first kalybe to be identified as a distinct type was in Umm Iz-Zetun (or Zetum), described by Eugène-Melchior de Vogüé in 1867. Together with the temple he found two Greek inscriptions describing the structure as a "kalybe." Other than these, the only occurrence of the term is in a lexicon of Hesychius of Alexandria from the 5th century; since that time more than seven similar temples have been identified in Roman Syria. In addition to Umm Iz-Zetum these include Shaqqa (Saccaea), Il-Haiyat, Shahba (Philippopolis) (built around 245 by the Emperor Philip the Arab), Qanawat (Kanatha), Bosra (Bostra), Amman (Philadelphia ) and Hippos.

Kalybes were built facing a square or plaza where worshipers could gather. It is believed they were influenced by Nabataean architecture. Possibly the oldest, at Bosra, was built in the late first century when Bosra was the capital of the Nabataean Kingdom under Rabbel II Soter. Their form most resembles the rock-cut temples at Petra, and most have been found in cities that were formerly part of the Nabataean Kingdom.
