= Donal O'Sullivan (priest) =

Irish Catholic priest and chaplain

Father Donal O'Sullivan
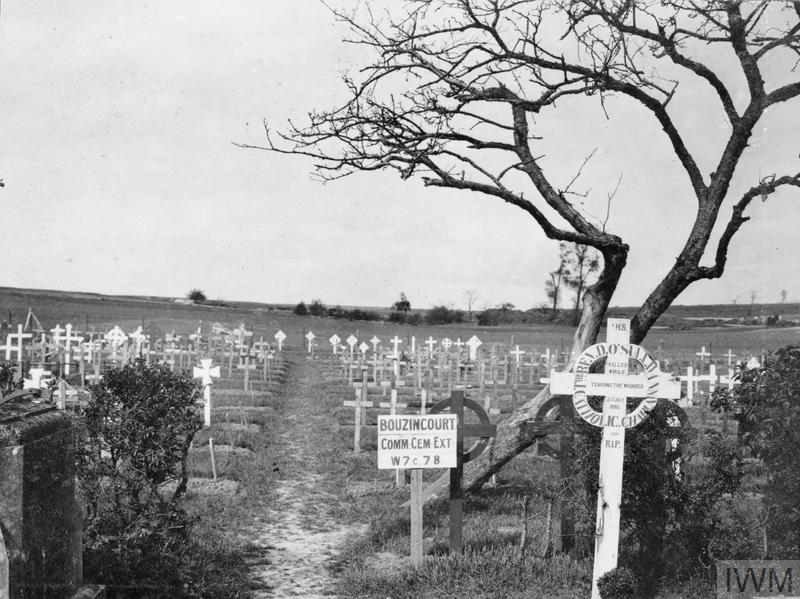
- Grave marker of O'Sullivan in the Bouzincourt Communal Cemetery
- Born: 1890; Killarney, Ireland
- Died: 5 July 1916 (aged 25–26); Albert, France
- Burial place: Bouzincourt Communal Cemetery
- Military career
- Allegiance: United Kingdom
- Branch: (United Kingdom) Royal Army Chaplains' Department
- Rank: Empire Force Chaplain 4th Class
- Unit: 1st Battalion Royal Irish Rifles
- Conflicts: World War I; Battle of the Somme †

Personal life
- Education: St Patrick's College, Maynooth
- Relatives: Dr. J. Ivo O'Sullivan (brother)

Religious life
- Religion: Roman Catholic Church
- Ordination: June 1914

Senior posting
- Post: Diocese of Kerry

Father Donal V. O'Sullivan (1890–5 July 1916) was an Irish Catholic priest, and chaplain in the 1st Battalion Royal Irish Rifles during World War I. He was killed at the Battle of the Somme, in Albert, France, on 5 July 1916, during the attack on Bouzincourt. O'Sullivan was mortally wounded by shrapnel from an exploding shell while he was ministering to a wounded English soldier. His brother, Dr. J. Ivo O'Sullivan, KM, served with the 5th Connaught Rangers, as a medic during the war, in Ypres, Salonika, and Gallipoli, earning a Military Cross.

A Chalice owned by O'Sullivan, was presented to the St Joseph's Young Priests Society, by his nephew, Dr. Ivo O'Sullivan.

== Life ==
O'Sullivan was born to Dan and Hannah O'Sullivan of High Street, Killarney, County Kerry. He was educated in St Brendan's College, Killarney and St Patrick's College, Maynooth, and was ordained at Maynooth in 1914 for the Diocese of Kerry. He returned to St. Brendan's to teach for 18 months before becoming an army chaplain. O'Sullivan ministered to the 7th Battalion, Royal Munster Fusiliers, and kept a diary from the day he left Killarney for the war until his death. The soldier who had been ministered to by O'Sullivan when he was killed travelled to Killarney and met his mother Hannah.

== Death ==
O'Sullivan is buried in Bouzincourt Communal Cemetery in the Somme. In 1927, the local priest in Kerry wished to have O'Sullivan reinterred in a local graveyard, however his mother, Hannah, disagreed saying he would have wished to remain alongside the men to whom he ministered. According to Tom Johnstone, who sources this to a letter from the curé of Bouzincourt to O'Sullivan's mother in the possession of the O'Sullivan family at Ballydowney House, Killarney, it was the curé who requested Mrs. O'Sullivan's permission to reinter O'Sullivan beside a new calvary erected to replace the one destroyed in the war. But reburial of the war dead was disallowed by the British government at that time, with the sole exception of the Tomb of the Unknown Warrior.
