= Saint-Maximin =

Saint-Maximin may refer to several places:

- Saint-Maximin, Gard, a commune in the Gard department in southern France
- Saint-Maximin, Isère, a commune in the Isère department in south-eastern France
- Saint-Maximin, Oise, a commune in the Oise department in northern France
  - Saint-Maximin limestone, a building stone from the quarries of Saint-Maximin, Oise
- Saint-Maximin-la-Sainte-Baume, a commune in the Var department in south-eastern France
- Saint Maximin's Abbey, Trier, a Benedictine monastery in Trier in the Rhineland-Palatinate, Germany

== People ==
- Allan Saint-Maximin, French footballer

== See also ==
- Maximin (disambiguation)
