= Bouzincourt Communal Cemetery =

WWI CWGC cemetery in Somme, France

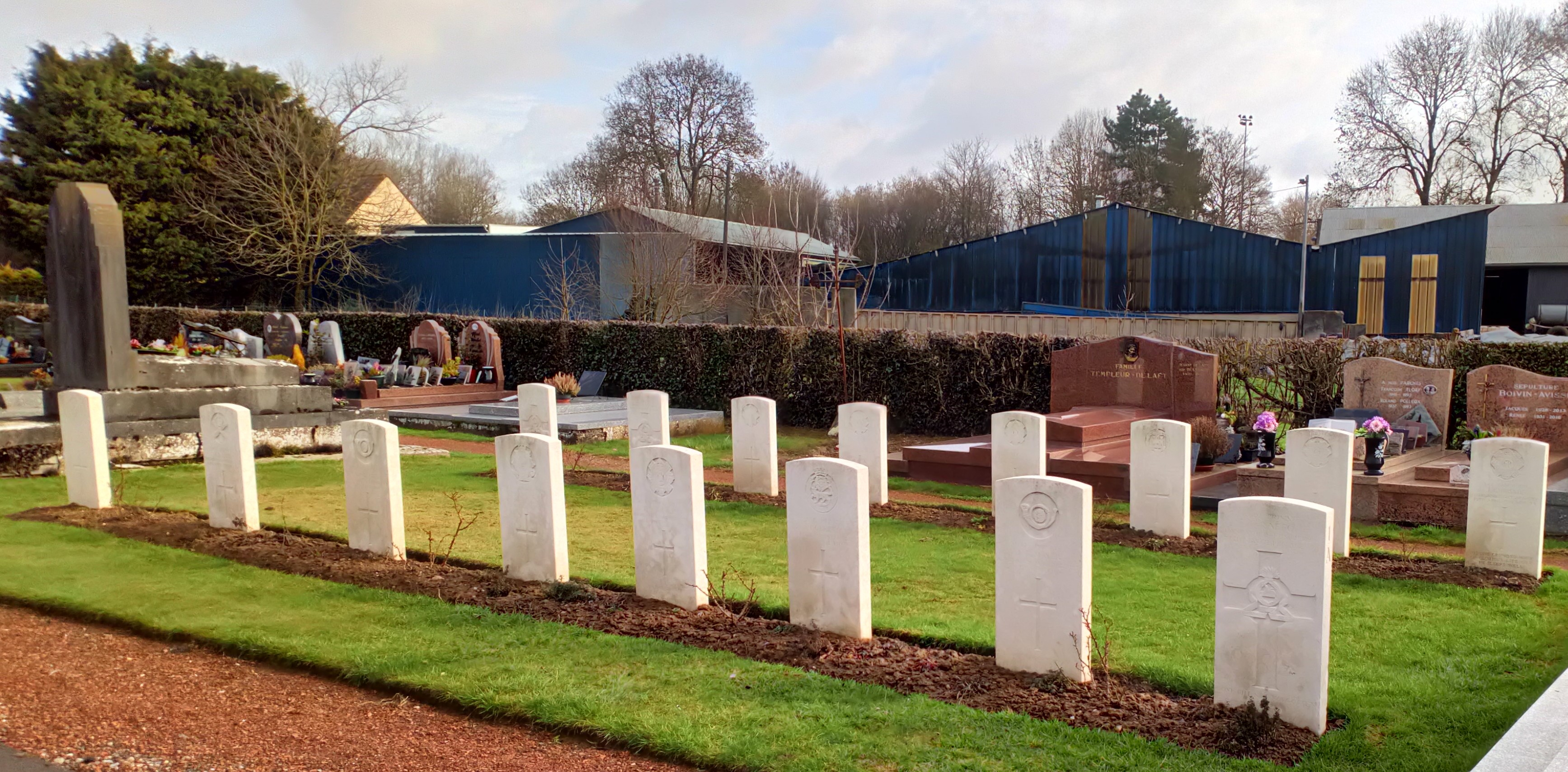

Details
- Established: March 1916
- Location: Bouzincourt, Somme, France
- Country: British and Commonwealth
- Coordinates: 50.0284°N 2.6078°E
- Type: Military
- Owned by: Commonwealth War Graves Commission (CWGC)
- No. of graves: 33 total
- Website: Official website
- Find a Grave: Bouzincourt Communal Cemetery

The Bouzincourt Communal Cemetery is a cemetery located in the Somme region of France commemorating British and Commonwealth soldiers who fought in the Battle of the Somme in World War I. The cemetery contains mainly soldiers who died on the front line near the village of Bouzincourt between March–July 1916 and April–June 1918, and is managed by the Commonwealth War Graves Commission.

== Location ==
The cemetery is located in the north of the village of Bouzincourt, which is approximately 3 kilometers northwest of the town of Albert, France on the D938 road.

== Establishment ==
Bouzincourt was used as a field ambulance station between early 1916 and February 1917. It was captured by the Germans for a few days in 1918. The cemetery was begun in March 1916 and was used between March–July 1916 and April–June 1918. The Bouzincourt Communal Commonwealth War Graves Commission Cemetery Extension was established in May 1916 and contains 589 burials.

=== Statistics ===
The cemetery contains a total of 33 burials, all of which are identified.
