= Jamrin =

Jamrin جمرين
- Village
- Location within Syria
- Coordinates: 32°32′51″N 36°29′43″E
- Grid position: 290/217 PAL
- Country: Syria
- Governorate: Daraa
- District: Daraa
- Subdistrict: Bosra al-Sham

Population (2004 census)
  - Total: 1,000
- Time zone: UTC+3 (AST)

Jamrin (Arabic: جمرين; transliteration: Jamrīn, also spelled Jimrin, Jemrin and Jemarrin) is a village in southern Syria, administratively part of the Daraa Governorate, located east of Daraa and immediately north of Bosra. Other nearby localities include Maaraba to the west, Kharaba to the northwest, al-Mujaymer to the north and al-Qurayya to the east. According to the Syria Central Bureau of Statistics (CBS), Jamrin had a population of 1,000 in the 2004 census. Its inhabitants are Sunni Muslim.

== History ==
=== Antiquity ===
Immediately north of Jamrin is the Roman-era Jamrin Bridge. In 543, during the Byzantine era, a church dedicated to St. Stephen was built in Jamrin.

=== Ottoman era ===
In 1596 it appeared in the Ottoman tax registers under the name of Jimrin, being part of the nahiya (subdistrict) of Bani Nasiyya in the Qada Hauran. It had an entirely Muslim population consisting of 15 households and 5 bachelors. They paid a fixed tax-rate of 40% on agricultural products, including wheat, barley, summer crops, in addition to occasional revenues; a total of 6,330 akçe. In 1838, it was noted as a ruin, Jemurrin, situated in "the Nukra [Hauran plain], east of Al-Shaykh Maskin".

=== Modern era ===
As of the 1980s, Jamrin's inhabitants belonged to three clans, with the office of the village's mukhtar (headman) being traditionally filled by members of the Kafarnah clan.

== Bibliography ==
- Baedeker, K. (1894). Palestine and Syria (2nd ed.). Leipzig: Karl Baedeker. OCLC 01028236..
- Batatu, H. (1999). Syria's Peasantry, the Descendants of Its Lesser Rural Notables, and Their Politics. Princeton University Press. ISBN 0691002541.
- Conder, C.R. (October 1890). "The Early Christians in Syria". The Scottish Review. 16: 215–240.
- Hütteroth, W.-D.; Abdulfattah, K. (1977). Historical Geography of Palestine, Transjordan and Southern Syria in the Late 16th Century. Erlanger Geographische Arbeiten, Sonderband 5. Erlangen, Germany: Vorstand der Fränkischen Geographischen Gesellschaft. ISBN 3-920405-41-2.
- Robinson, E.; Smith, E. (1841). Biblical Researches in Palestine, Mount Sinai and Arabia Petraea: A Journal of Travels in the year 1838. Vol. 3. Boston: Crocker & Brewster.
