= Miguel Zugastegui =

18th and 19th-century Mexican Franciscan friar and revolutionary

Friar Miguel Zugastegui, O.F.M.

Personal details
- Born: 14 February 1773 Ometusco Hacienda, Otumba, Mexico, New Spain
- Died: 3 May 1809 (aged 36) San Juan de Ulúa, Veracruz, Veracruz, Mexico, New Spain
- Occupation: Franciscan priest and revolutionary

Miguel Zugastegui y Verduzco, O.F.M. (or Zugasti, 14 February 1773 – 3 May 1809) was a Criollo Franciscan friar and revolutionary, who took part in early stages of the independence movement of Mexico. He is honored in Mexico as a martyr of the struggle for independence from Spain.

== Life ==
Zugastegui was born in the region of Otumba, the son of Juan Zugasti (Note: Despite this spelling of the paternal surname on his baptismal certificate, Friar Miguel always spelled his name in the form recorded in history.) and Ana Verduzco, both born in Spain. Feeling called to become a priest, he went to Mexico City to study theology, where he decided to enter the Order of Friars Minor.

After his ordination as a Catholic priest, Zugastegui was committed to serve the people in the confessional. On afternoons that he was free, he would go to a cafe which was popular with the unemployed men of the city who wished to discuss the current events of the day. On 11 August 1808 he was vocal and vehement in his support of Mexican independence from the Spanish Empire and in support of the call for a national convention to discuss the establishment of a local government due to the seizure of the Spanish Crown by Napoleon. This step was opposed by the Audiencia Real, the legislative authority of the colony. The Viceroy, José de Iturrigaray, on the other hand, was in favor of the congress and had the support of the Criollos (locally born children of Spanish colonists) segment of the population.

When Zugastegui's words were reported to the Alcalde (Chief Justice) of the Real Audiencia, he asked the Guardian of the Convent of San Francisco to have him confined while he prepared a report of the incident. The finalized report simply mentioned the imprudence on Zugastegui's part. With the growing crisis of the government in Spain, the friar was forgotten by the government, and he was soon allowed to the leave the friary again, with the goal of assisting the dying. After the military coup which deposed Iturrigaray, new comments made by Zugastegui criticizing the new viceroy, Pedro de Garibay, however, soon brought him back to the attention of the Audiencia. His accuser claimed that the friar was involved in plans by French forces to overthrow the Spanish government in New Spain.

Based on this, the Alcalde had Zugastegui arrested in the middle of the night, so as to avoid attention. Without any judicial process, due to the panic by government authorities out of the political crisis in Spain, on 27 March 1809 he was judged guilty of agitating for independence and ordered deported to Spain. The judgement was approved by Vicetory Garibay on 15 April. He was then transported to Veracruz, together with the Mercedarian friar, Melchor de Talamantes, the author of the tract for independence which had led to the military coup. When they arrived, they were imprisoned in Fort San Juan de Ulúa to await transport to Spain. He fell ill from yellow fever while there and died in the early hours of 3 May.

Upon being advised of Zugastegui's death, the Guardian of the Franciscan friary in Veracruz requested the body. It was buried in the sepulcher of the house.
