= Maximianus =

Maximianus or Maximian may refer to the following people:

- Marcus Valerius Maximianus, suffect consul in 186, legionary legate during the Marcomannic Wars
- Maximian (Marcus Aurelius Valerius Maximianus Herculius), co-emperor with Diocletian, 286–305
- Galerius Maximianus, Roman emperor, 305–311
- Magnus Maximus, or Maximianus (c. 335–388), usurping ruler of the Western Roman Empire
- Maximian (bishop of Carthage) (late 4th century), an adherent of the Donatist sect of Christianity
- Archbishop Maximianus of Constantinople, archbishop 431–434
- Maximianus of Ravenna (499–556), bishop of Ravenna
- Maximianus (poet), sixth-century Latin poet

== See also ==
- Maximin (disambiguation)
- Maximilian, a male given name
