= José Eduardo de Cárdenas =

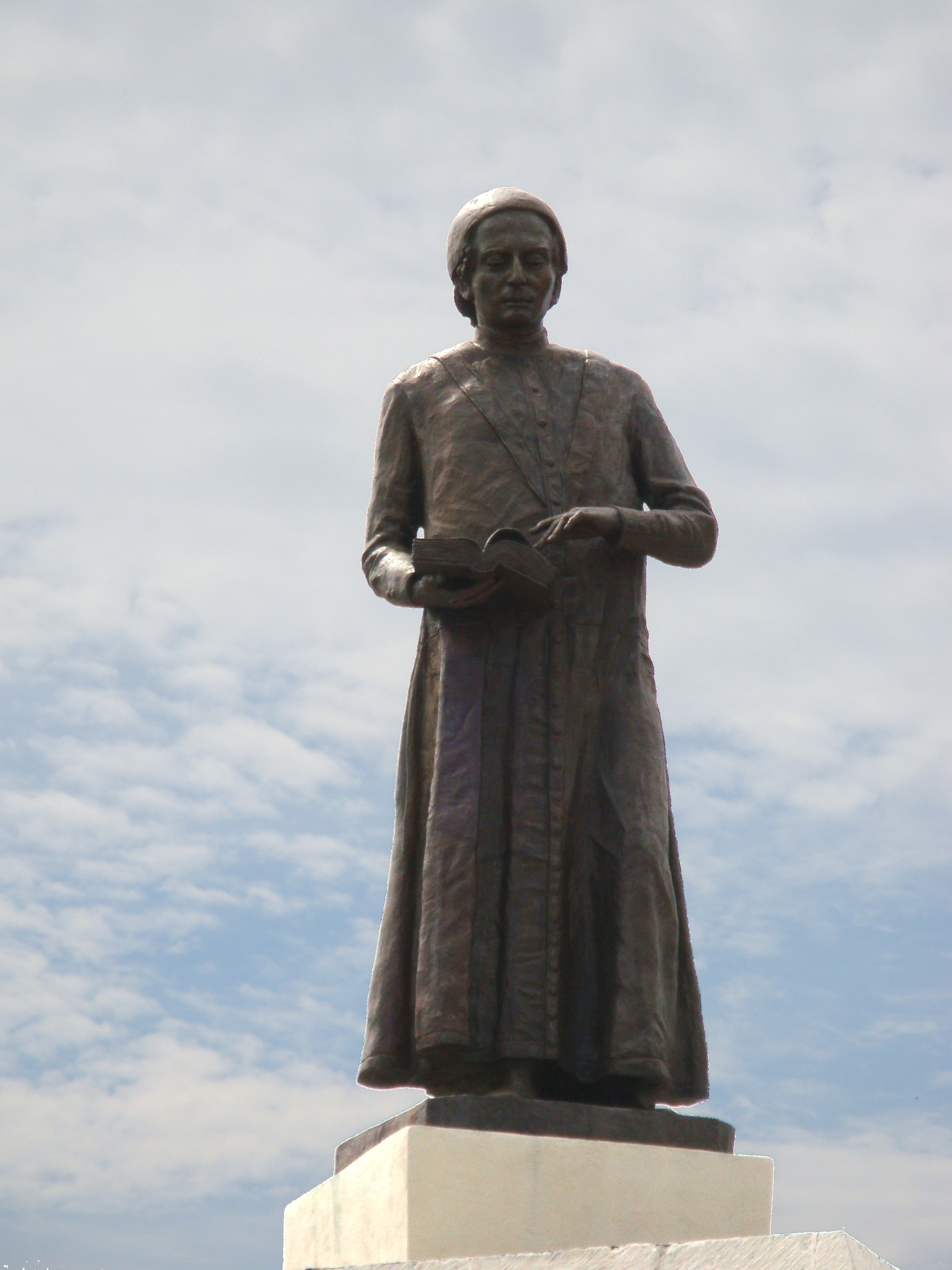
Cárdenas statue

José Eduardo de Cárdenas (1765–1821) was a priest, theologist, politician, poet and writer of New Spain (now Mexico). He was professor of Latin at the seminary of San Ildefonso in Mérida, Yucatán and vice-rector of the Colegio de San Juan de Letrán in Mexico City. He was also priest of the town of Cunduacán, honorary vicar in capite for Tabasco and Commissary of the Holy Inquisition in Tabasco.
