= 1st Battalion Royal Irish Rifles in World War I =

The service of the 1st Battalion Royal Irish Rifles in World War I saw the battalion serving on the Western Front throughout the war. It participated in several of the most significant battles of the war, including the battles of Neuve-Chapelle, the Somme, Passchendaele and St Quentin. It suffered very heavy casualties, repeatedly losing its commanding officers during offensives; by the end of one attack in 1916, it was down to only one surviving officer and sixty men. It participated in the final Allied offensive against Germany in 1918 before returning home in May 1919.

== Mobilisation and early actions ==
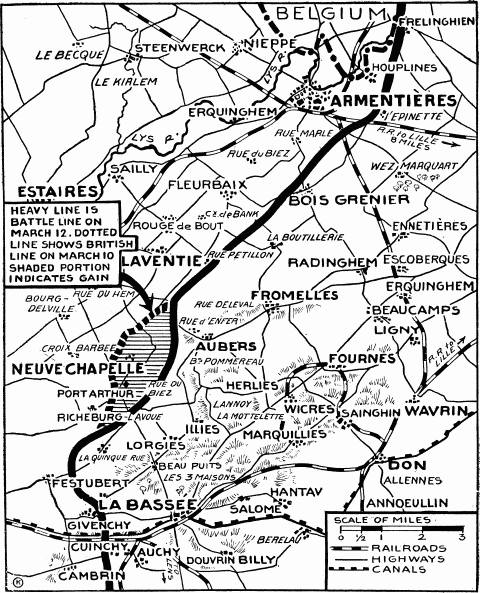
Map of the Battle of Neuve Chapelle, New York Times, May 1915

The 1st Battalion Royal Irish Rifles was serving in Aden when the First World War broke out in August 1914. The Ottoman Empire had not yet entered the war so the battalion was sent to England in September, where it prepared for a deployment to France, attached to the 25th Infantry Brigade, 8th Division. It travelled from Southampton to Le Havre at the start of November and took up positions east of Laventie in the Pas de Calais.

The battalion's first major action was the Battle of Neuve Chapelle between 10 and 13 March 1915. After an initial artillery bombardment, the battalion advanced to the previously captured German front lines and helped to secure the village of Neuve-Chapelle. It then had to weather heavy German counter-attacks which failed to dislodge the members of the battalion but caused very heavy casualties, amounting to 18 officers and 440 other ranks, including its Colonel.

During the Battle of Fromelles on 19–20 July 1915 - The battle of Fromelles took place on 19 and 20 July 1916. The battle mentioned here should be the Battle of Aubers ridge (9–10 May 1915) - the battalion successfully took its objectives at Rouge Bancs near Fromelles, but it again suffered very heavy casualties. At the subsequent Battle of Loos in September–October 1915, the battalion carried out a subsidiary attack at Bois Grenier. Although it gained ground, it had to withdraw. The following month, the battalion was sent to the rear for rest and training after a full year in the trenches.

== Somme and Passchendaele ==
After a further tour of the trenches at Rouge Bancs, the battalion was posted to Albert in the Somme. A German raid inflicted casualties in April 1916, but worse was to come in the Battle of the Somme in July, when the battalion was ordered to attack the German-held village of Ovillers-la-Boisselle. The attack was unsuccessful and cost the battalion many lives, including that of its colonel, who was mortally wounded early in the offensive. The Battalion's chaplain, Donal O'Sullivan was killed in the Somme.

The battalion left the Somme for Loos after the first phase of the battle but returned in October 1916 to fight on the ridges of Le Transloy in appallingly muddy conditions. After a rest, it was posted to Bouchavesnes-Bergen at the end of December and advanced to take a swathe of German-held territory during the German retreat to the Hindenburg Line in March 1917.

In June 1917, the battalion was transferred to positions immediately east of Ypres, where it supported the British offensive that opened the Battle of Passchendaele on 31 July. Yet again, its colonel was killed on the opening day of the battle and the rest of the battalion suffered massive casualties. By 16 August, when it had advanced well forward of the rest of the attacking force, it only had one surviving officer and 60 other ranks.

== Final offensives ==
The remainder of the battalion spent a gruelling winter on the ridges above Paschendaele before being transferred in February 1918 to the 36th (Ulster) Division near Saint-Quentin. It played a prominent role in opposing the German attack during Operation Michael (known to the British as the Battle of St Quentin) in March 1918. The following month, the battalion returned to the Somme, where it remained until the Hundred Days Offensive saw the Allies going on the offensive and decisively defeating the Germans, bringing about the Armistice of 11 November 1918.

Following the Armistice, the battalion was posted to the formerly German-occupied area of Mouscron in Belgium before returning to England in May 1919. Very few of its original members from 1914 survived the war.

== Bibliography ==
- Lt. F.P. Roe; et al. (1923). A Short History of the Royal Ulster Rifles. Aldershot: Gale & Polden. OCLC 771232739.
