= Andzej Derdziuk =

Polish Catholic priest and academic professor (born 1962)

Andzej Derdziuk Ph.D.
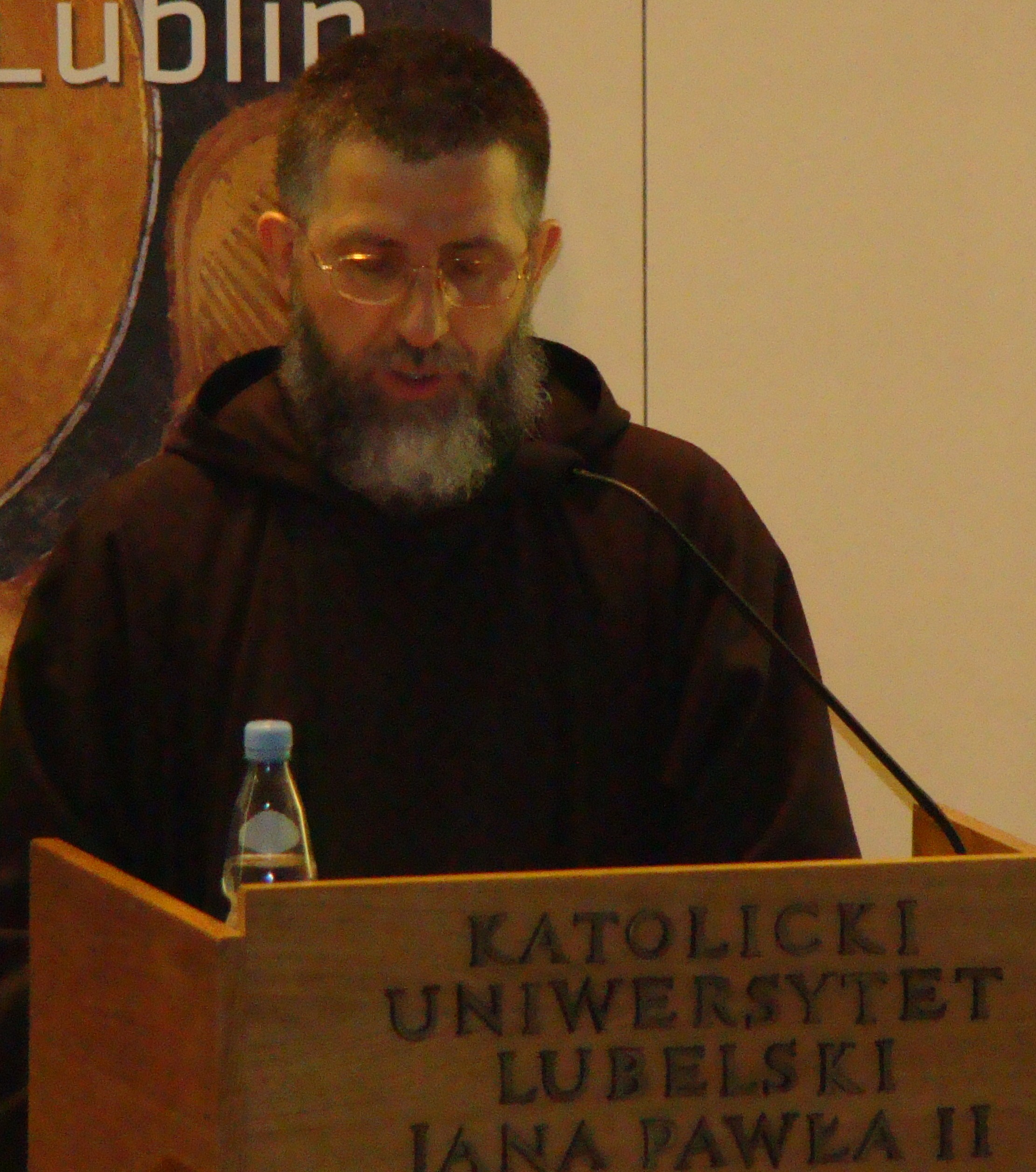
- Derdziuk
- Born: 24 January 1962 (age 64); Skierbieszów, Poland
- Religion: Catholic
- Church: Catholic Church
- Title: Professor of Theological Sciences

Andrzej Derdziuk (born January 24, 1962) is a Polish Catholic priest, Capuchin monk, member of the Warsaw Province of the Order of Friars Minor Capuchin, from 2012 to 2015 vice-rector of the Catholic University of Lublin. He is currently an academic teacher at the Faculty of Theology of the John Paul II Catholic University of Lublin.

== Early life ==
Derdziuk was born in January 24, 1962 in Skierbieszów. He is the twin brother of Zbigniew Derdziuk. On June 9, 1987 Derdziuk was ordained a priest in Lublin by John Paul II. In 1993 he obtained a doctorate in theology.

== Education ==
In 2001 Derdziuk obtained a postdoctoral degree. On September 19, 2011 he received the title of professor of theological sciences from the president of the Republic of Poland. associate professor and head of the Department of the History of Moral Theology since 2003. He also specializes in the theology of consecrated life.

== Career ==
From 1996–2001 he was secretary of the Section of Polish Moral Theologians and served as vice-chairman of the Conference of Rectors of Seminaries in Poland. In the years 1994–2000 and 2004–2007 he was a rector of the Capuchin Higher Seminary in Lublin. In the years 2005–2008 vice-dean of the Faculty of Theology of the Catholic University of Lublin. He was a member of the Committee of Theological Sciences of the Polish Academy of Sciences for the term 2011–2015 and the editor-in-chief of the journal "Studia Nauk Teologiczne" PAN. Since 2011, nominated by Archbishop Stanisław Budzik, member of the Council of Priests of the Archdiocese of Lublin. On May 10, 2012, he was elected Vice-Rector for Development of the John Paul II Catholic University of Lublin for the years 2012–2016. He held this position until May 28, 2015. Since 2015, he has been the chairman of the Department of Theological Sciences of the Lublin Scientific Society. Since 2020, member of the Committee of Theological Sciences of the Polish Academy of Sciences.

== Religious life ==
As of 2025, he serves as a member of the Scientific Council of the John Paul II Institute of the Catholic University of Lublin and the chairman of the VI Department of Theological Sciences of the Lublin Scientific Society. He lives in the monastery of the Friars Minor Capuchin at the parish of the Immaculate Heart of the Virgin Mary and St. Francis of Assisi in Lublin, where he is responsible, among other things, for the Padre Pio Prayer Group.

== Selected publications ==
Author of various books and articles:

- Grzech w XVIII wieku. Nurty w polskiej teologii moralnej, RW KUL, Lublin 1996, ISBN 9788322805077
- A. Derdziuk, M. Stopikowska Moraliści polscy. Informator, Publisher Diecezjalne i Drukarnia w Sandomierzu, 1999, ISBN 8388006541
- Aretologia w podręcznikach moralistów kapucyńskich w okresie między Soborem Watykańskim I a Watykańskim II, Wydawnictwo KUL, Lublin 2001, ISBN 832280945X
- Aretologia konsekrowana, czyli cnoty zakonne, Alleluja, Kraków 2003, ISBN 8387440337
- Szata świadectwa, Alleluja, Kraków 2003, ISBN 8387440590
- Posłuszeństwo przełożonych, Alleluja, Kraków 2008, ISBN 9788360967645
- W trosce o posiadanie Ducha Pańskiego. Rozważania nad Konstytucjami Braci Mniejszych Kapucynów, Wydawnictwo Diecezjalne i Drukarnia w Sandomierzu, 2008
- Kapłan w służbie Bogu i ludziom, Alleluja, Kraków 2010, ISBN 9788360967690
- W odpowiedzi na dar Miłosierdzi, Bracia Mniejsi Kapucyni, Lublin 2010; wyd. II poprawione Gaudium, Lublin 2010, ISBN 9788375480184
- W odpowiedzi na dar młodości, Gaudium, Lublin 2010, ISBN 9788375480153
- Teologia moralna w służbie wiary Kościoła, Wydawnictwo KUL, Lublin 2010, ISBN 9788377020630
- W odpowiedzi na dar miłości, Gaudium, Lublin 2010 ISBN 9788375480351
- A. Derdziuk, A. Zwierz Spowiedź kobiet, Gaudium, Lublin 2010; wyd. II Gaudium, Lublin 2011, ISBN 9788375480429
- Ojciec Pio w Lublinie, Gaudium, Lublin 2011. ISBN 9788387229429
- Mądrość spotkania. Kierownictwo duchowe bł. Jana Pawła II wobec Wandy Półtawskiej Św. Paweł, Częstochowa 2011, ISBN 9788377970430
- W odpowiedzi na dar powołania, Publisher KUL, Lublin 2016, ISBN 9788380611573
- W służbie miłosierdzia, Zakon Braci Mniejszych Kapucynów. Prowincja Warszawska, Lublin 2016, ISBN 9788387229481; wyd. II Gaudium, Lublin 2016, ISBN 9788375482461
- Ojciec Pio przewodnik na drodze modlitwy i cierpienia, Wydawnictwo Diecezjalne i Drukarnia w Sandomierzu, 2016, ISBN 9788381010214
- In response to the gift of mercy, Publisher Światło-Życie, Kraków 2016, ISBN 9788375351934
- Drogi krzyżowe, Lublin, 2025

== Bibliography ==
- "prof. dr hab. Andrzej Derdziuk". pracownik.kul.pl (in Polish).
