= Bouzincourt Communal Cemetery Extension =

WWI CWGC cemetery in Somme, France

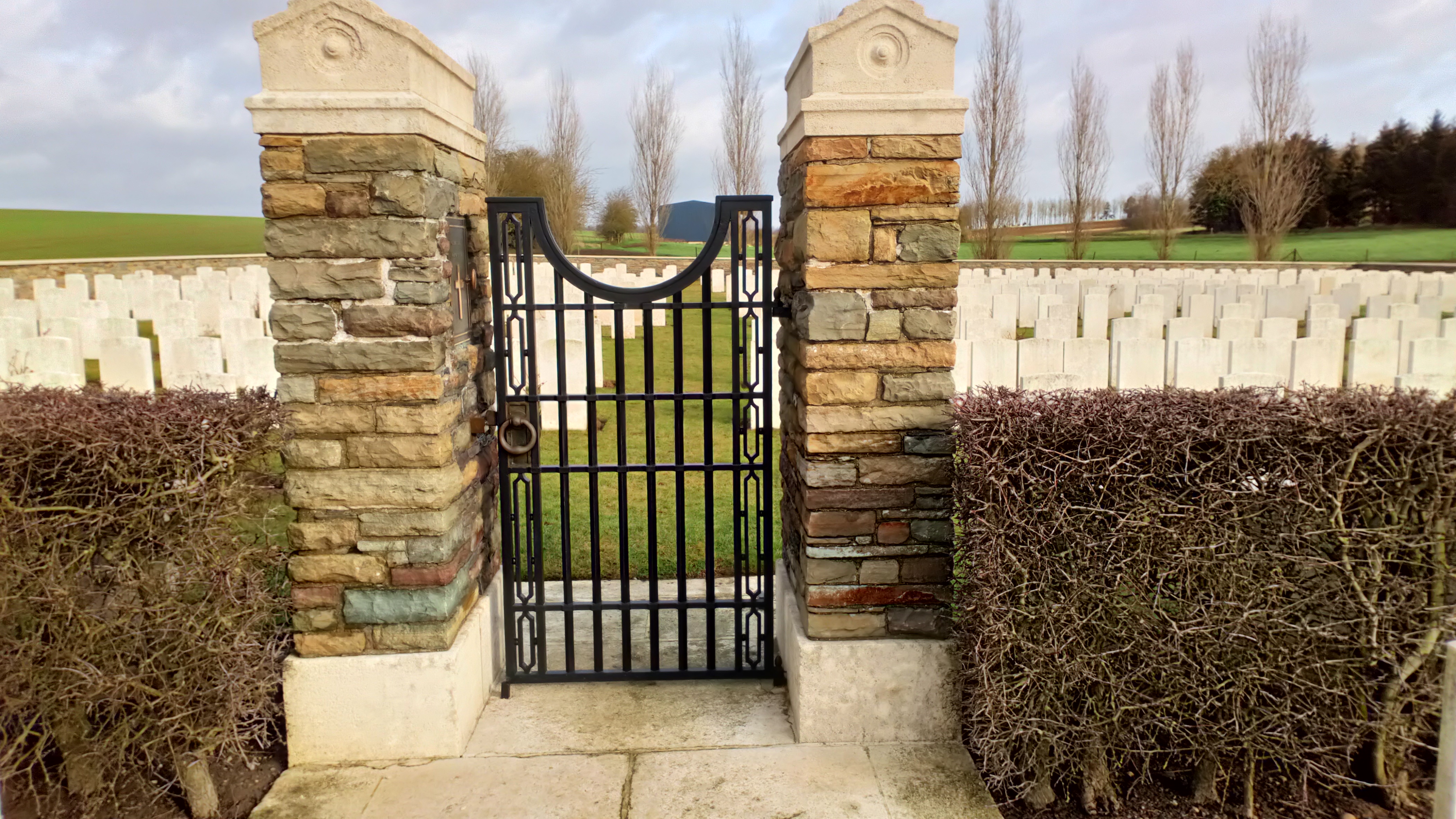

Details
- Established: May 1916
- Location: Bouzincourt, Somme, France
- Country: British and Commonwealth
- Coordinates: 50°01′44″N 2°36′30″E
- Type: Military
- Owned by: Commonwealth War Graves Commission (CWGC)
- No. of graves: 592 total, 484 identified
- Website: Official website
- Find a Grave: Bouzincourt Communal Cemetery Extension

The Bouzincourt Communal Cemetery Extension is a cemetery located in the Somme region of France commemorating British and Commonwealth soldiers who fought in the Battle of the Somme in World War I. The cemetery contains mostly those who died between May 1916 and February 1917 and between March and September 1918 on the front line near the village of Bouzincourt. The cemetery is managed by the Commonwealth War Graves Commission.

== Location ==
The cemetery is located in the north side of the village of Bouzincourt, which is approximately 3 kilometers northwest of the town of Albert, France on the D938 road.

== Establishment of the Cemetery ==
The extension was begun in May 1916 and was used until February 1917. The extension was reopened and used from March to September 1918 by the British 38th Welsh Division. In 1919, 20 casualties from around Bouzincourt were reburied in Plot III, Row A. Between 1924 and 1925, 108 more casualties from other Somme battlefields and two Australians from Framerville were reburied in Plots III, IV, and V. The extension was designed by Sir Reginald Blomfield and John Reginald Truelove.

=== Statistics ===
The extension contains 592 Commonwealth burials, of which 484 are identified and 108 are unidentified. Special memorials are dedicated to those believed to be buried among the unknown.

Identified Burials by Nationality
Nationality	Number of Burials
United Kingdom	470
Canada	7
Australia	5
Germany	2

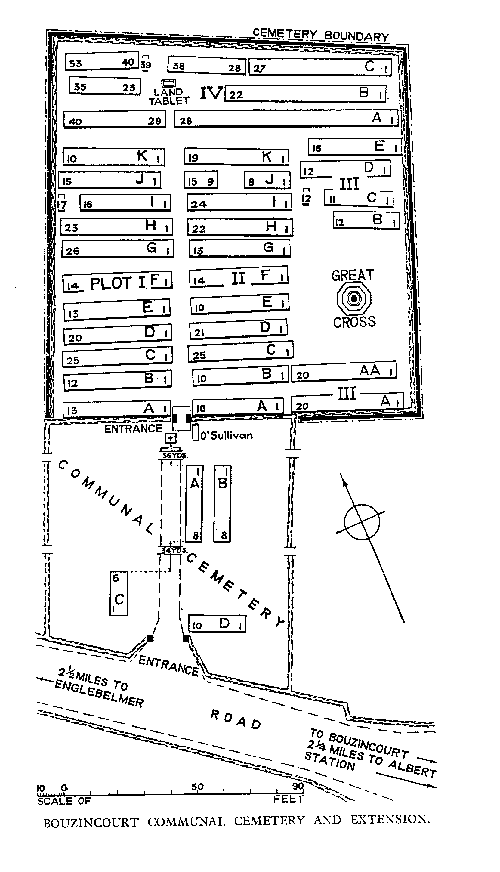
Bouzincourt Communal Cemetery Layout
