= Ecclesiastical history of Braga =

The region around the city of Braga, in modern Portugal, was an important centre for the spreading of Christendom in the Iberian Peninsula. This is reflected in the number of religious personalities associated with the region and the fact that many ecumenical councils were held in the city.

== Historical outline ==
The tradition that Peter of Rates, a disciple of James the Great, preached here, is handed down in the ancient Breviary of Braga (Breviarium Bracarense) and in that of Évora; but this, according to the Bollandists, is purely traditional. Auditus of Braga is called the third bishop of the city. Paternus was certainly bishop of the see about 390.

In its early period the Diocese of Braga produced the writer Paulus Orosius (fl. 418). At the beginning of the eighteenth century a contest was waged over the birthplace of Orosius, some claiming him for Braga and others for Tarragona. The Marquis of Mondejar, with all the evidence in his favour, supported the claim of Braga; Pablo Ignacio de Dalmases y Ros, the chronicler of Catalonia, that of Tarragona.

Avitus of Braga, a contemporary writer of lesser importance, was a priest who went to the East to consult with Augustine at the same time that Orosius, who had been sent by Augustine, returned from consulting Jerome. It was through Avitus that the priest, Lucian of Caphar Gamala near Jerusalem, made known to the West the discovery of the body of Stephen (December, 415). The Greek encyclical letter of Lucian was translated into Latin by Avitus and sent to Braga with another for the bishop, Balconius, his clergy, and people, together with a relic of Stephen. (Note: The relics of Stephen, entrusted to Orosius, were left by him in Mallorca when he returned to North Africa and have been lost (H. Wace, Dictionary, s.v. "Orosius").) Avitus also attended the Council of Jerusalem against Pelagius (415). Two others of the name Avitus, men of note, introduced into these provinces the doctrines of Origen and Victorinus.

Some have denied that Braga was a metropolitan see; others have attempted without sufficient evidence, however, to claim two metropolitan sees for Gallaecia before the sixth century. In fact after the destruction of Astorga (433) by the Visigoths, Braga was elevated to the dignity of a metropolitan see in the time of Leo I (440-461). Balconius was then its bishop and Agrestius, Bishop of Lugo, was the metropolitan. At the latter's death the right of metropolitan rank was restored to the oldest bishop of the province, who was the bishop of Braga. From this time, until the Muslim conquest of Hispania (711), he retained the supremacy over all the sees of the province.

In 1110 Pope Paschal II restored Braga to its former metropolitan rank. When Portugal separated from León in 1139, Braga assumed even greater importance. It contested with Toledo the primacy over all the Iberian sees, but the popes decided in favour of the latter city. Since it retained as suffragans the dioceses of Porto, Coimbra, Viseu, Bragança-Miranda do Douro, Aveiro and Pinhel. In 1390 Braga was divided to make the Archdiocese of Lisbon, and in 1540 its territory was again divided to create the Archdiocese of Évora.

There have been many very famous bishops and writers in this diocese. Among its earlier bishops, besides the traditional Peter already mentioned, the most famous is Martin of Braga who died in 580, noted for his wisdom and holiness. Gregory of Tours says of him (Hist. France, V, xxxvii) that he was born in Pannonia, visited the Holy Land, and became the foremost scholar of his time. Isidore of Seville ("De Viris illustribus", c. xxxv) writes that he "was abbot of the monastery of Dumio near Braga, came to Gallaecia from the East, converted the Suevic inhabitants from the heresy of Arianism, taught them Catholic doctrine and discipline, strengthened their ecclesiastical organization, and founded monasteries. He also left a number of letters in which he recommended a reform of manners, a life of faith and prayer, and giving of alms, the constant practice of all virtues and the love of God." For his writings, see Otto Bardenhewer, Patrologie (2nd ed., 1901), 579-581.

Braga having been destroyed by the Saracens, and restored in 1071, a succession of illustrious bishops occupied the see. Among these were:

- Mauricio Burdinho (1111–14), sent as legate to the Emperor Henry V (1118), and by him created antipope with the title of Gregory VIII
- Pedro Juliano, Archdeacon of Lisbon, elected Bishop of Braga in 1274, created cardinal by Gregory X in 1276, and finally elected pope under the name of John XXI
- Saint Bartholomew a Martyribus (1559–67), a Dominican, who in 1566, together with Luis de Sotomayor, Francisco Foreiro, and others, assisted at the Council of Trent
- de Castro, an Augustinian (1589–1609), who consecrated the cathedral, 28 July 1592

Aleixo de Meneses, also an Augustinian, was transferred to Braga from the archiepiscopal see of Goa. He had been an apostle to the Nestorians of the Malabar Coast in Farther India and had converted them to Catholicism with the help of missionaries of the various religious orders. Under him was held the Council of Diamper (1599), for the establishment of the Catholic Church on the Malabar Coast. He died at Madrid in 1617 in his fifty-eighth year in the odour of sanctity, being then President of the Council of Castile.

Other bishops of note were:

- Rodrigo da Cunha (1627–35), historian of the Catholic Church in Portugal
- Rodrigo de Moura Teles (1704–28), who restored the cathedral
- Caetano da Anunciação Brandão, popularly considered a saint

== Church Councils of Braga ==
Many church councils were held in Braga, some of them important. The authenticity of the so-called council of 411 is very doubtful. It was probably invented by Bernardo de Brito.

There were other councils at Braga in 1278-1280, 1301, 1328, 1436, 1488, 1537, besides various diocesan and provincial synods of lesser importance.
