= Absadah =

4th-century Christian priest, martyr, and saint

Martyr
- Born: c. 300 near Behnesa, Egypt
- Died: Alexandria, Egypt
- Venerated in: Catholic Church
- Feast: 19 January

Absadah was a priest and martyr of the early 4th century, who is venerated as a Saint in the Catholic church. He suffered martyrdom in the Diocletianic persecution.

== Life ==
Absadah was born near Behnesa, Egypt, c. 300. He was a priest to a small congregation in his village. Upon the start of the Diocletian Persecution, Absadah barricaded himself in his home, planning to hide from persecution. Later, he recounted a vision of Jesus Christ appearing before him. He voluntarily came before the court, and was sent to Alexandria.

Absadah was sentenced to be burnt alive; however, he was beheaded outside the walls of the city. He was buried at Cairo.

== Sainthood ==
The Catholic Church commemorates Absadah as a saint, with a feast day of January 19.

== Sources ==
- Absadah at Catholic Online
