= Henry Dieckhoff =

Russian Catholic priest and linguist (1869–1950)

Father Henry Cyril Dieckhoff
- Born: 1869; Moscow
- Died: 1950 (aged 80–81); Fort Augustus
- Known for: work in Scottish Gaelic lexicography
- Scientific career
- Fields: linguistics, Celtic studies

Father Henry Cyril Dieckhoff (Russian: Генрих Кирилл Дикхофф) (1869–1950) was a Russian Catholic priest and linguist. He was born in Moscow, the son of a Lutheran preacher, but spent much of his youth in Germany, as his mother was Catholic and unable to continue living in Russia. He studied in Berlin and was given Holy Orders without permission from the Russian authorities and therefore first fled to England and then Scotland, where he was welcomed as a brother at the Fort Augustus Abbey in 1891. He gained priesthood six years later in 1897.

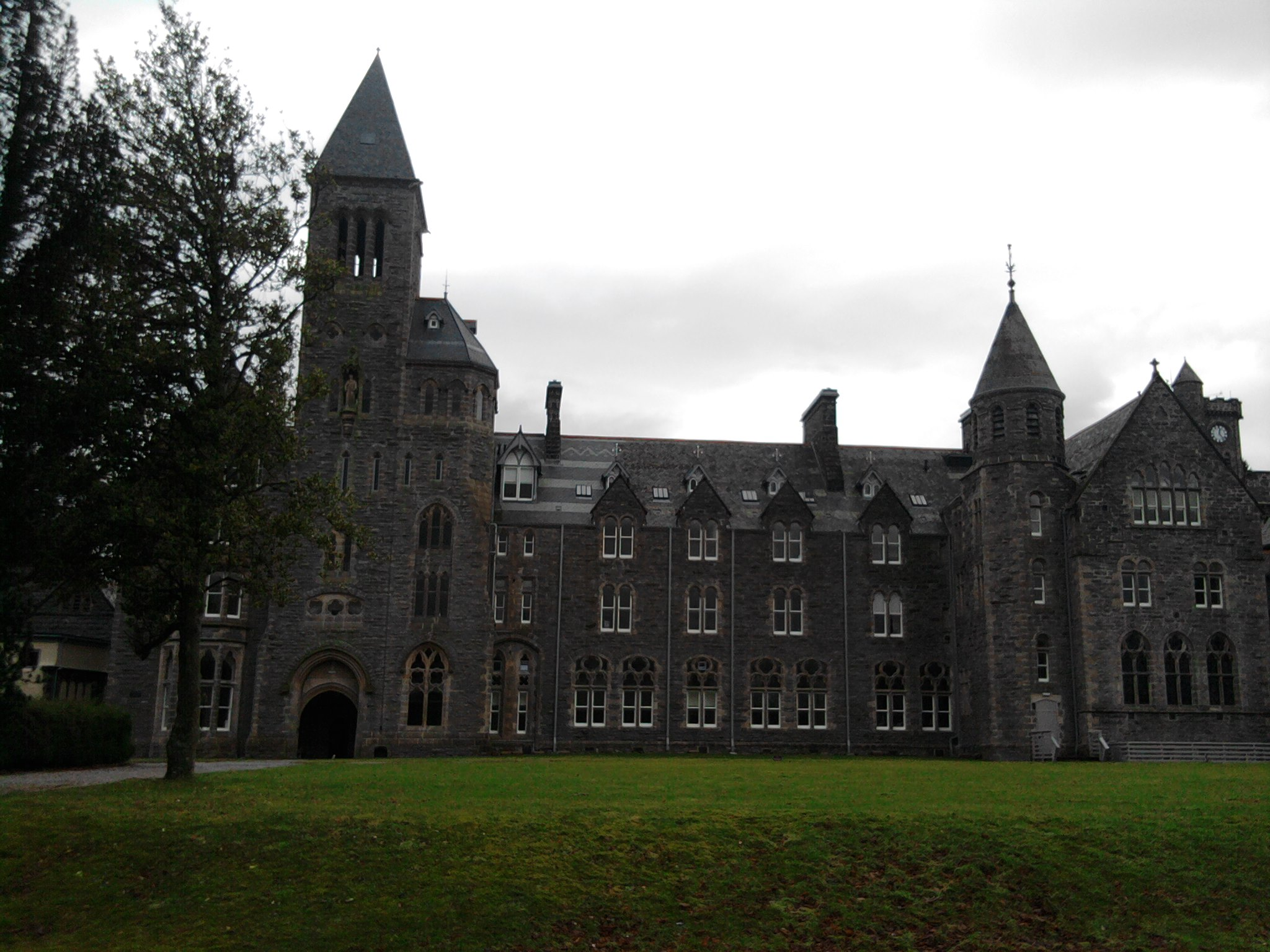
Fort Augustus Abbey

He learned Scottish Gaelic and did detailed research into the dialect of Glengarry and published a dictionary on the dialects, A Pronouncing Dictionary of Scottish Gaelic. His dictionary was unusual for the time as it included detailed pronunciation information not only on the citation forms but also inflected forms of the entries.
