= Peter Abbelen =

German clergyman (1843-1917)

Father Peter Matthias Abbelen (8 August 1843 – 24 August 1917) was the Roman Catholic vicar general of the Milwaukee Archdiocese and later the spiritual director for the School Sisters of Notre Dame in Milwaukee. Abbelen was born in Germany but moved to the United States.

In 1886, Abbelen petitioned the Vatican to recognize German-speaking Catholic parishes in the United States in parallel to English-speaking parishes mostly filled with Irish immigrant Catholics. Abbelen sought this partly in order to allow for a slower integration into American life and in the belief that it would preserve the faith of German immigrants. The Congregation for the Propagation of the Faith did not decide in his favour.
