= Abrosima =

4th-century Christian priest, martyr, and saint

Martyr
- Died: 341 or 342; Persia
- Feast: April 22 in the Roman Catholic Church, November 10 in the Greek Orthodox Church

Abrosima was a Persian Christian priest and martyr. His name is also listed as Abrosimus.

He was stoned to death with many of his parishioners in 341 or 342 during the reign of the Sassanid ruler Shapur II.

His feast day is celebrated on April 22 in the Roman Catholic Church, and on November 10 in the Greek Orthodox Church.

== Sources ==
- Holweck, F. G. A Biographical Dictionary of the Saints. St. Louis, MO: B. Herder Book Co. 1924.
