= Avitus of Braga =

Avitus of Braga (Latin Avitus Bracarensis) was an early fifth-century literary priest of Braga (Portugal), who travelled to consult with Augustine and attend the Council of Jerusalem (415) that found against Pelagius. He is remembered for having produced a Latin translation of the first-person account of the miraculous finding of Saint Stephen's tomb near Jerusalem in 415, which he prefaced by a general letter. His personal concern was embodied in relics of the Protomartyr, which would have encouraged the pilgrimage trade at Braga and which he entrusted to Paulus Orosius, also of Braga, to deliver there. Orosius, however, reaching Majorca and hearing daunting news of conditions in Hispania, which was disordered by the invasion of the Vandals, left the relics, which have disappeared, and returned to North Africa.
