= Rosario Stroscio =

Indian Roman Catholic Priest

Reverend Rosario Stroscio
- Archdiocese: Calcutta

Personal details
- Born: Rosario Stroscio; 1922 Sicily, Italy
- Died: 9 July 2019 (aged 96–97) Ruby General Hospital, Kolkata
- Buried: Basillica of our lady of Happy Voyage
- Denomination: Roman Catholic
- Residence: Auxilium Parish, Kolkata

Father Rosario Stroscio (1922 in Sicily – 9 June 2019) was Roman Catholic Salesian priest and exorcist.
