= Shahba =

Shahba شَهْبَا Philippopolis
- City
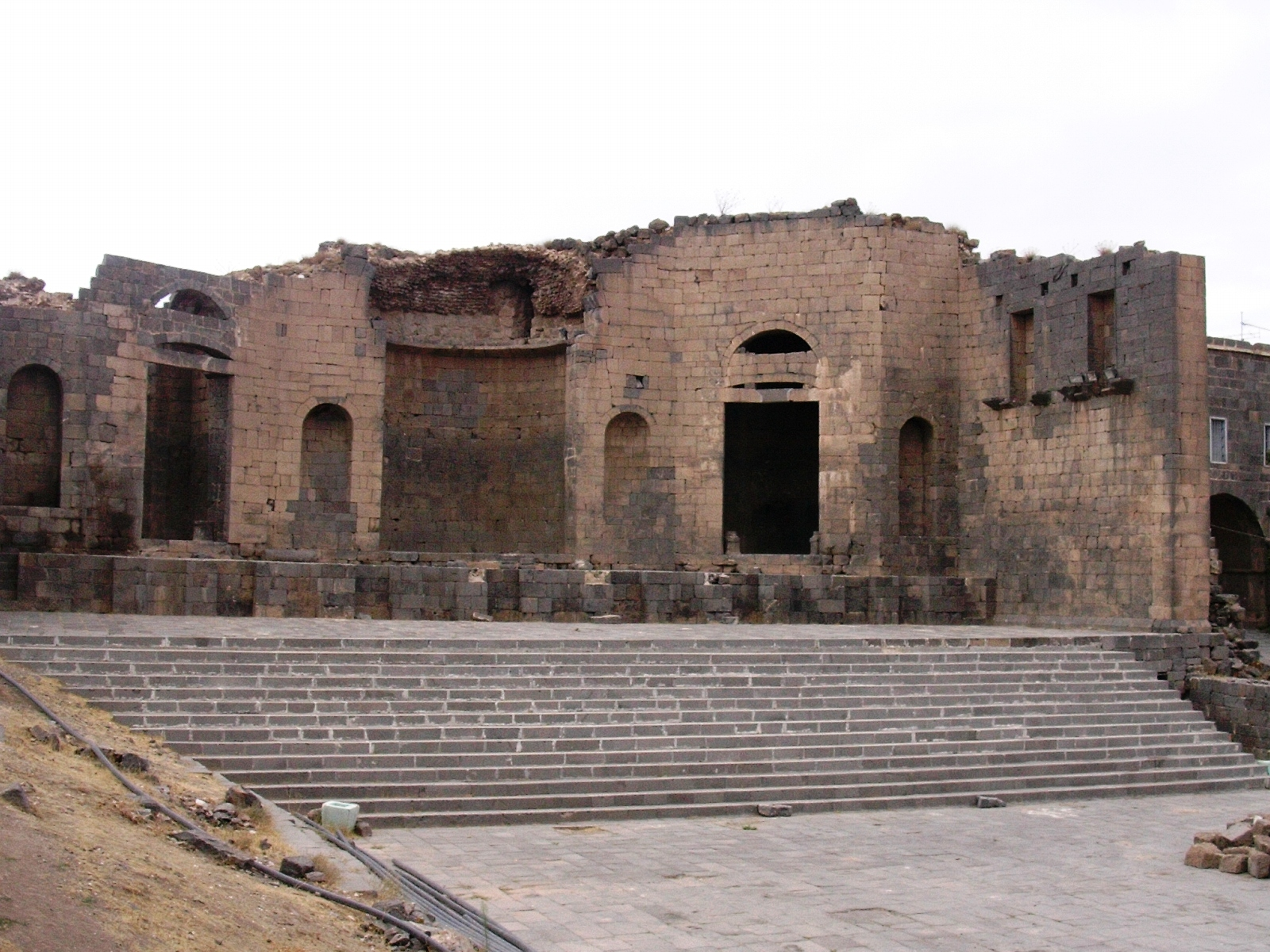
- The Philippeion, a memorial monument

- Location in Syria
- Coordinates: 32°51′15″N 36°37′45″E
- Grid position: 302/251
- Country: Syria
- Governorate: Suwayda
- District: Shahba
- Subdistrict: Shahba

Population (2004 Census)
  - Total: 13,660
- Time zone: EEST

Shahba (Arabic: شَهْبَا / ALA-LC: Shahbā) is a city located 87 km (54 mi) south of Damascus in the Jabal al-Druze in Suwayda Governorate of Syria, but formerly in the Roman province of Arabia Petraea. Known in Late Antiquity as Philippopolis (in Arabia), the city was the seat of a Bishopric (see below), which remains a Latin titular see. The city had a population of 13,660 in the 2004 census. In Shahba, Druze make up the predominant population, while Christians and Sunni Muslim Bedouins represent a minority.

== History ==
=== Roman era ===
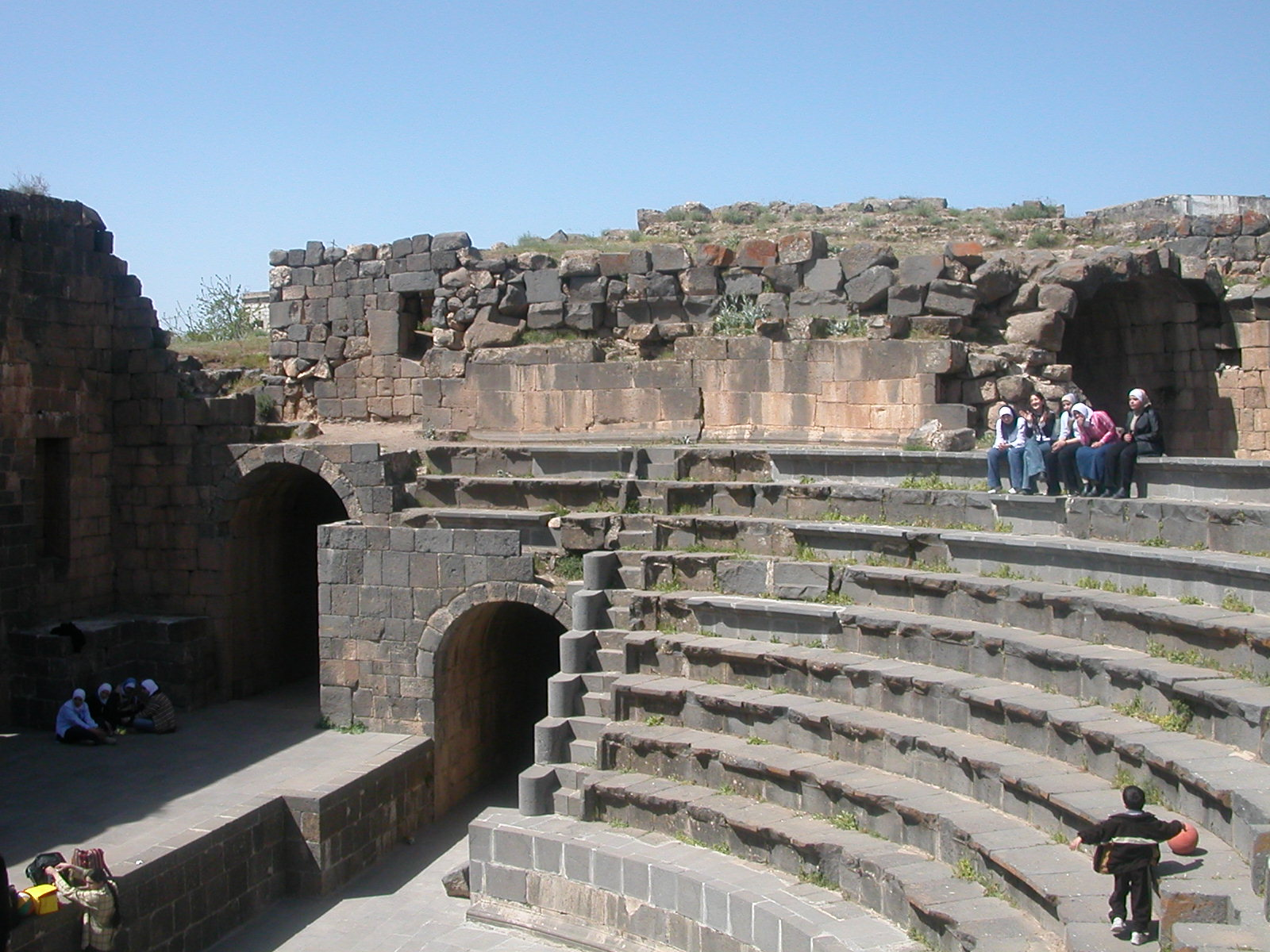
The Roman Theatre at Shahba

The oasis settlement now named Shahba had been the native hamlet of the Roman emperor Philip the Arab. After Philip became emperor in 244, he dedicated himself to rebuilding the little community as a colonia. The contemporary community that was replaced with the new construction was so insignificant that one author states that the city can be considered to have been built on virgin soil, making it the last of the Roman cities founded in the East.

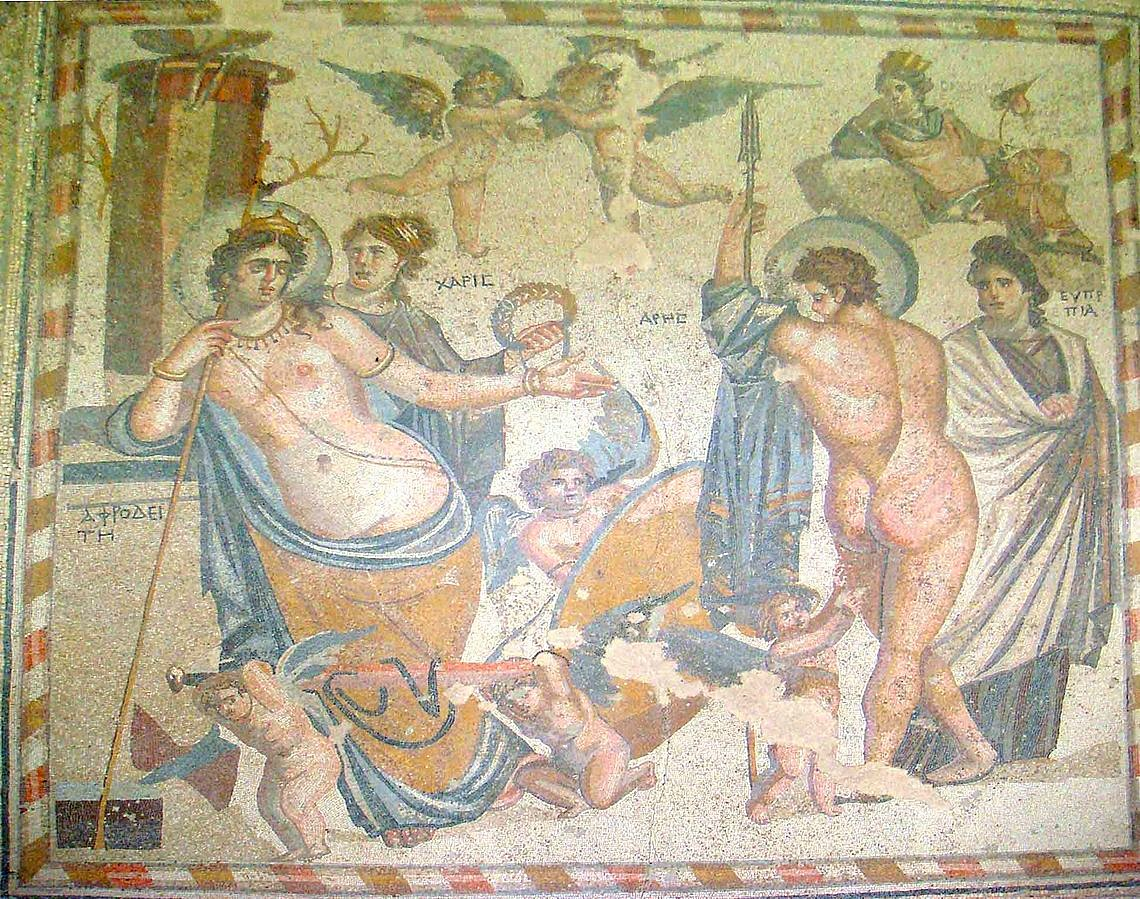
Mosaic from Shahba depicting Aphrodite and Ares

The city was renamed Philippopolis (a name with homonyms) in dedication to the emperor, who is said to have wanted to turn his native city into a replica of Rome herself. A hexagonal-style temple and an open-air place of worship of local style, called a kalybe, a triumphal arch, baths, a starkly unornamented theatre faced with basalt blocks, a large structure that has been interpreted as a basilica, and the Philippeion (illustration, right) surrounded by a great wall with ceremonial gates, were laid out and built following the grid plan of a typical Roman city.

The public structures formed what author Arthur Segal has called a kind of "imported façade". The rest of the urban architecture was modest and vernacular. The city was never completed as building seems to have stopped abruptly after the death of Philip in 249.

The new city followed the extremely regular Roman grid-plan, with the main colonnaded Cardo maximus intersecting a colonnaded Decumanus Maximus at right angles near the center. Lesser streets marked off insulae, many of which never saw houses constructed upon them.

=== Ottoman era ===
In 1596 Shahba appeared in the Ottoman tax registers as Sahba and was part of the nahiya of Bani Miglad in the Hauran Sanjak. It had an entirely Muslim population consisting of 8 households and 3 bachelors, who paid a fixed tax rate of 40% on wheat, barley, summer crops, goats and/or beehives; a total of 5,050 akçe.

In 1838 Shuhba was noted by Eli Smith as being located in Jabal Hauran, and inhabited by Druze and "Greek" Christians.

Because it was far from population centers that would have required cut stone for building and might have quarried it from those deserted in Philippopolis, Shahba today contains well-preserved ruins of the ancient Roman city.

A museum located in the city exhibits some beautiful examples of Roman mosaics. The especially rich iconography of the figurative mosaic on the theme, The Glory of the Earth, discovered in 1952 in the so-called "Maison Aoua", is conserved today in the museum of Damascus and has proved a rich resource for iconographers.

The relatively well-preserved Roman bridge at Nimreh is located in the vicinity.

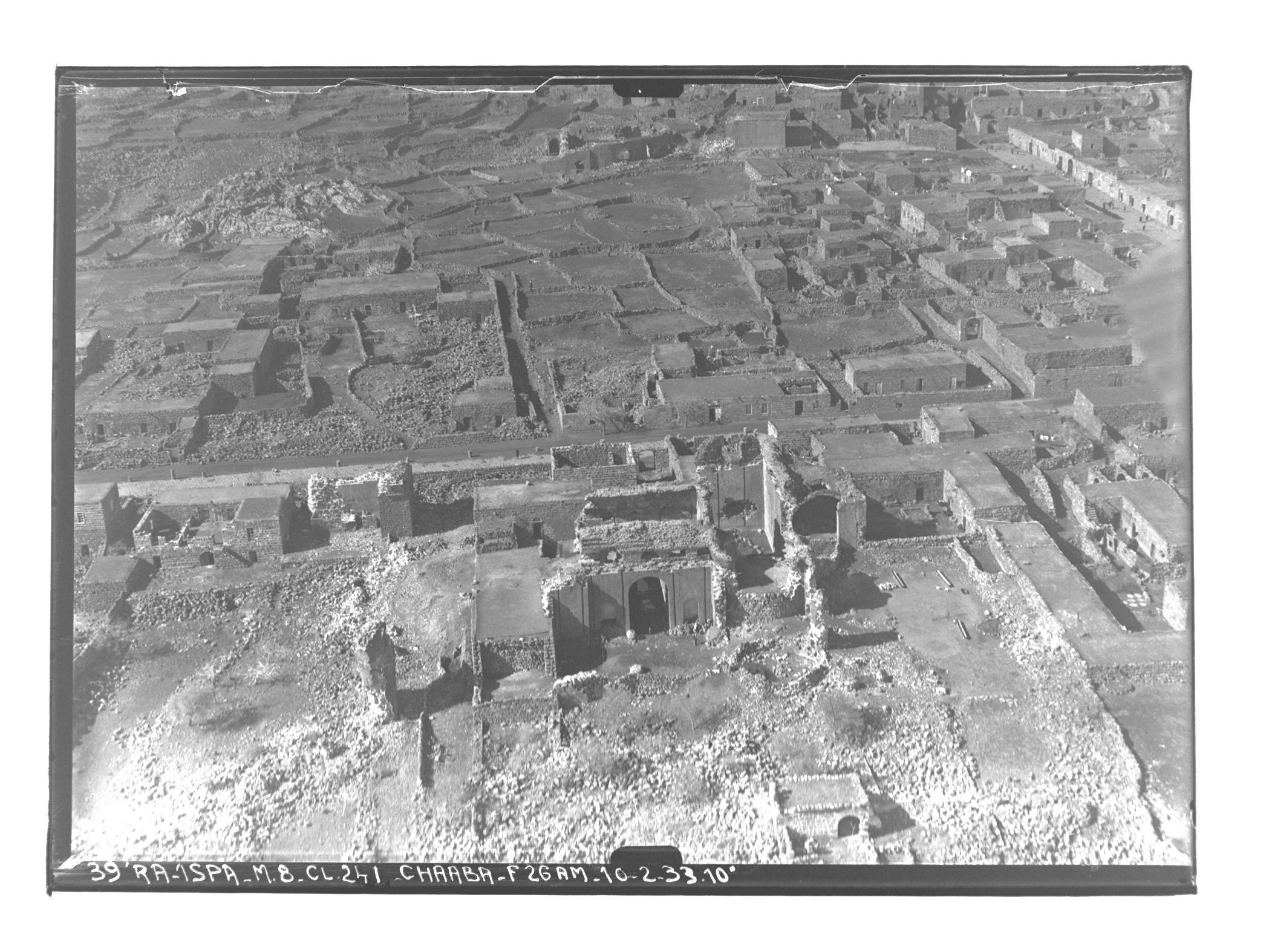
Aerial view in 1933.

In the 18th century Druze populations from Mount Lebanon moved into the area. A Christian presence exists in the city to the present.

== Demographics ==
The inhabitants of the city are mainly Druze, with small Christian and Sunni Muslim Bedouin minorities.

In 2011, the Melkite Greek Catholic Church had approximately 450 believers.

The number of Greek Catholic families does not exceed seventy houses, the parish is very small compared to the number of the population.

== Religious buildings ==
- St. Anthony the Great Greek Orthodox Church
- St. Philip (Philippopolis) the Apostle Melkite Greek Catholic Church
- Evangelical Baptist Church
- Omar ibn al-Khattab Mosque
- Maqam Tell Sheyhan (Druze Shrine)

== Climate ==
Shahba has a cold semi-arid climate (Köppen climate classification BSk).

Climate data for Shahba
Month	Jan	Feb	Mar	Apr	May	Jun	Jul	Aug	Sep	Oct	Nov	Dec	Year
Mean daily maximum °C (°F)	10.3 (50.5)	11.6 (52.9)	15.2 (59.4)	20.1 (68.2)	25.6 (78.1)	29.4 (84.9)	30.7 (87.3)	31.2 (88.2)	29.3 (84.7)	25.9 (78.6)	18.8 (65.8)	12.5 (54.5)	21.7 (71.1)
Mean daily minimum °C (°F)	1.3 (34.3)	2.2 (36.0)	4.4 (39.9)	7.6 (45.7)	11.2 (52.2)	14.1 (57.4)	15.7 (60.3)	15.9 (60.6)	14.0 (57.2)	11.3 (52.3)	7.4 (45.3)	3.4 (38.1)	9.0 (48.3)
Average precipitation mm (inches)	61 (2.4)	60 (2.4)	46 (1.8)	18 (0.7)	9 (0.4)	0 (0)	0 (0)	0 (0)	1 (0.0)	11 (0.4)	26 (1.0)	53 (2.1)	285 (11.2)
Source: Climate data

== See also ==
- List of Catholic dioceses in Syria
- Druze in Syria
- Christians in Syria

== Bibliography ==
- Eubel, Konrad Hierarchia Catholica Medii Aevi, vol. 2, p. 215; vol. 3, p. 273; vol. 4, p. 280; vol. 5, p. 314; vol. 6, p. 337
- Gams, Pius Bonifacius, 1931, Series episcoporum Ecclesiae Catholicae, Leipzig, p. 435
- Hütteroth, W.-D.; Abdulfattah, K. (1977). Historical Geography of Palestine, Transjordan and Southern Syria in the Late 16th Century. Erlanger Geographische Arbeiten, Sonderband 5. Erlangen, Germany: Vorstand der Fränkischen Geographischen Gesellschaft. ISBN 3-920405-41-2.
- Robinson, E.; Smith, E. (1841). Biblical Researches in Palestine, Mount Sinai and Arabia Petraea: A Journal of Travels in the year 1838. Vol. 3. Boston: Crocker & Brewster.
- Lequien, Michel, 1740, Oriens christianus in quatuor Patriarchatus digestus, Paris, vol. II, coll. 861-862
