= Gemarrin Bridge =

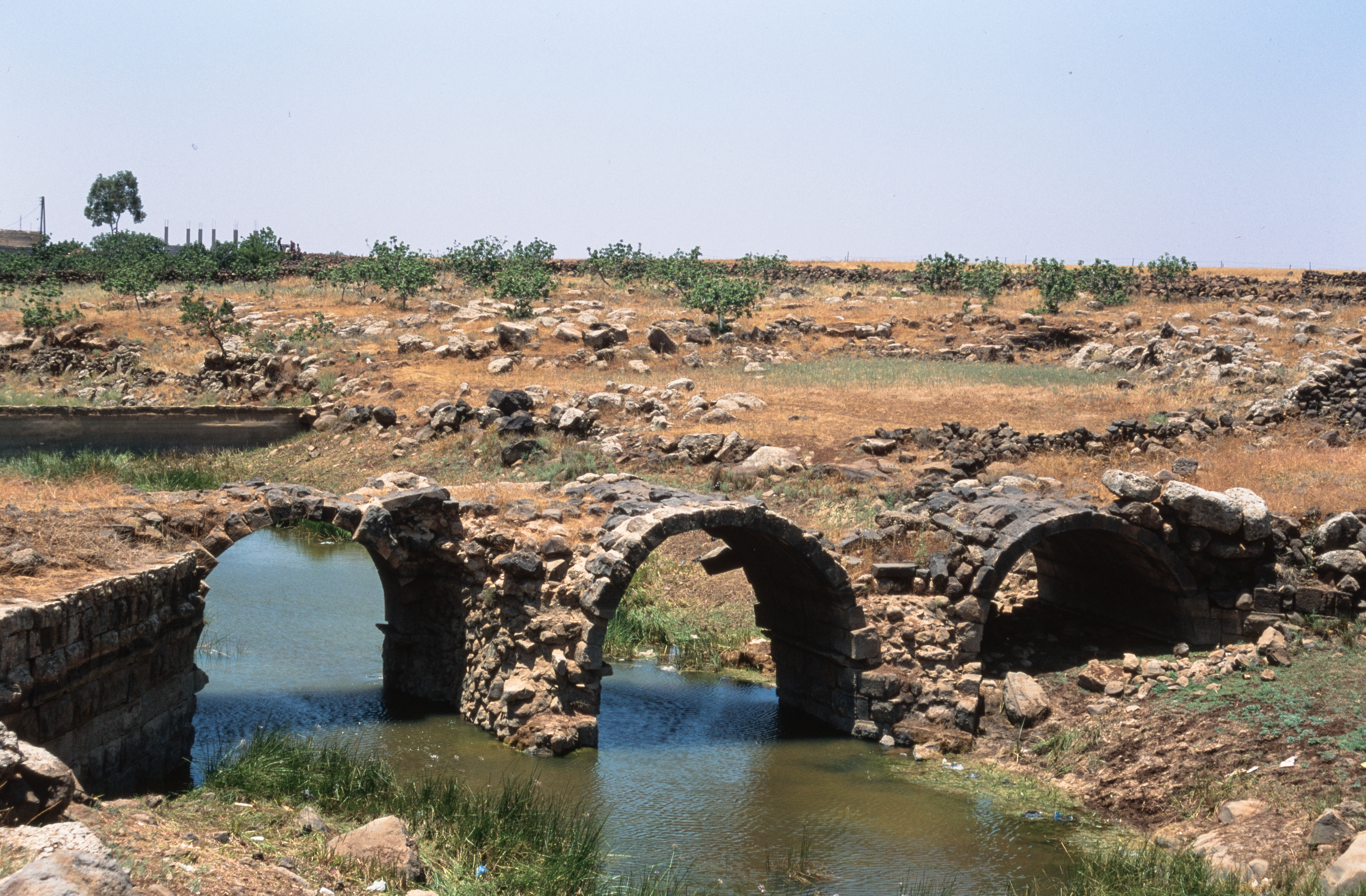
- Remains of the Gemarrin Bridge, view from southeast
- Coordinates: 32.549389°N 36.496028°E
- Carries: Roman road to As-Suwayda
- Crosses: Wadi Zeidi
- Locale: Close to Bosra, Syria

Characteristics
- Design: Arch bridge
- Material: Basalt blocks
- No. of spans: 3

The Bridge of Gemarrin is a Roman bridge in the village of Jemarrin near the ancient city of Bosra in southern Syria. The bridge belonged to the Roman road to Soada Dionysias (As-Suwayda), crossing the Wadi Zeidi some kilometers north of Bostra.

Today, the structure presents itself essentially as an arch skeleton: while the three semi-circular arches, made from local basalt, are still extant, the roadway and the fill have been removed to expose the top of the arch vaults. Obliquely running embankments on both sides of the wadi force the water in the river bed under the bridge.

At least two other Roman bridges over the Wadi Zeidi, the Kharaba Bridge and the one At-Tayyibeh, have survived to this day.

== See also ==
- List of Roman bridges
- Roman architecture
- Roman engineering

== Sources ==
- Kissel, Theodor; Stoll, Oliver (2000), "Die Brücke bei Nimreh. Ein Zeugnis römischer Verkehrspolitik im Hauran, Syrien", Antike Welt, vol. 31, no. 2, pp. 109–125
