= Maximin Alff =

American Catholic priest (1866–1923)

The Very Reverend Maximin Alff SS.CC.
- Provincial of the Catholic mission in Hawaii
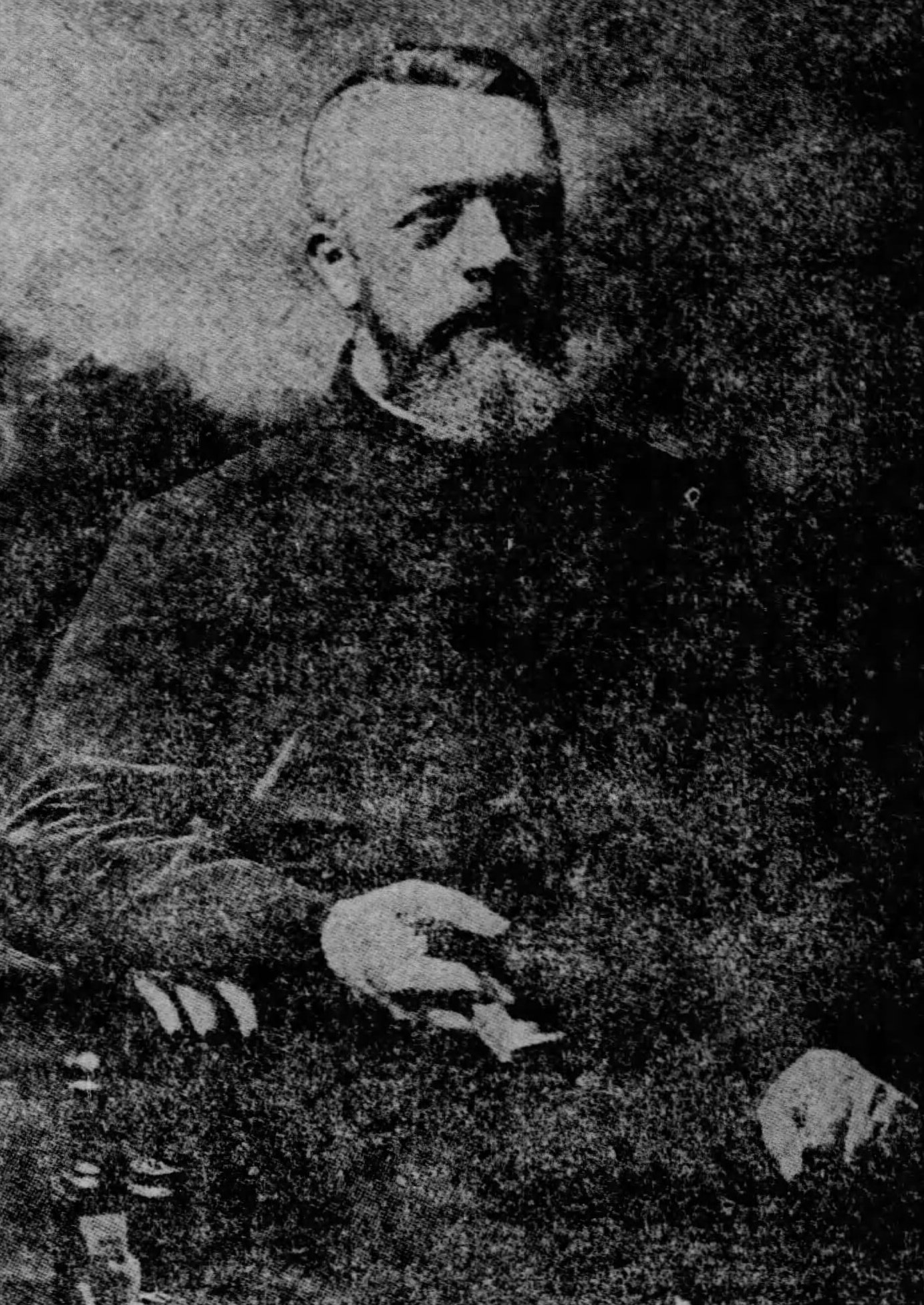
- Church: Roman Catholic
- In office: 12 August 1912 – 17 May 1923

Orders
- Ordination: 24 August 1890

Personal details
- Born: 24 July 1866 Trier, German Confederation
- Died: 17 May 1923 (aged 56) Honolulu, Hawaii
- Buried: King Street Catholic Cemetery
- Occupation: Pastor, teacher

Reverend Maximin Alff, SS.CC., (24 July 1866 – 17 May 1923) was born in Trier, Germany. He completed his theological studies at Louvain, Belgium, and was professed a member of the Congregation of the Sacred Hearts of Jesus and Mary in 1887. He was for a time professor of philosophy at Miranda de Ebro, Spain. He came to Honolulu from Spain, arriving on 25 October 1894. He occupied several positions with the church in Hawaii, as pastor at South Kona, Koloa and Hana. He then went to Maui, where he was pastor of the Wailuku church. He became provincial of the Catholic mission on 12 August 1912, and remained in Honolulu since that time. He died on 17 May 1923 and was buried in the King Street Catholic Cemetery.
