= Kharaba Bridge =

- Coordinates: 32°33′04″N 36°26′00″E
- Crosses: Wadi Zeidi
- Locale: Close to Bosra, Syria

Characteristics
- Design: Arch bridge
- Material: Basalt blocks
- Width: 4.52 m
- Longest span: 3.8 m
- No. of spans: 3

The Kharaba Bridge is a Roman bridge in the village of Kharaba in the fertile Hauran region of Syria, close to the city of Bosra (ancient Bostra).

The bridge crosses the Wadi Zeidi, a tributary of the Yarmuk, 3.5 km northwest of Bosra. It has three semi-circular arches, each 3.8 m clear, that rest on 2.4 m wide piers with a height of 2.5 m to the springing level. The bridge width is 4.52 m. At the eastern side exists a small squarish floodway which is supported by a column with capital. The vaults and the covering are predominantly built with black greenish basalt ashlar; overall, the ancient structure is still in a fairly good condition.

There are at least two more Roman bridges crossing the Wadi Zeidi: the Gemarrin Bridge and one at At-Tayyibeh.

== See also ==
- List of Roman bridges
- Roman architecture
- Roman engineering

== Sources ==
- Kissel, Theodor; Stoll, Oliver (2000), "Die Brücke bei Nimreh. Ein Zeugnis römischer Verkehrspolitik im Hauran, Syrien", Antike Welt, vol. 31, no. 2, pp. 109–125
- O’Connor, Colin (1993), Roman Bridges, Cambridge University Press, p. 131, ISBN 0-521-39326-4
