= Valère de Langres =

Valère de Langres or Saint Valère (died 22 October 411, also known as Saint Vallier), archdeacon of Langres, was arrested by a group of Vandals led by a man named Chrocus, beaten and beheaded on 22 October 411 in Port-sur-Saône or in Port-Saint Pierre, a place on the Saône River which today is within the commune (municipality) of Heuilley-sur-Saône.

== History ==
In 411, the Vandals invaded Gaul. They seized the city of Langres and killed the city's bishop, Dizier, who had tried to intervene between the barbarians and the city's inhabitants (According to Guillaume Flamang, a canon in Langres in 1482, Vandals under the leadership of a man named Chrocus beheaded the bishop.). After the martyrdom of the bishop, archdeacon Valère rallied Christians and tried to ensure their safety by fleeing to the Jura mountains. But when the group arrived at a place on the Saone called Portus Bucinus, Valere and his group of Christians encountered the enemy and were killed. Experts disagree on the exact location of Portus Bucinus, some of them identifying it as Port-sur-Saône, while others say it was Port-Saint Pierre which today is within the commune (municipality) of Heuilley-sur-Saône.

According to tradition, the body of Saint Valère (or Vallier) was buried not far from the place where he was martyred. His grave was found in the sixth century by a warrior named Gaudericus. Traveling with his army to Italy, he was miraculously informed in his sleep that his troops were encamped on the spot where the remains of St. Valere were buried. A celestial voice promised him victory if he promised, on his return, to build a church in his honor. Victorious, Gaudéricus returned safe and sound, but because of a lack of money he had a modest oratory built with the intention of founding a large building later. Death prevented him from finishing this project. However, the bishop of Langres replaced the oratory with a larger church ... built either in Talmay (a village near Port-Saint Pierre) or Port-sur Saône.

The Catholic church in Talmay is named Église Saint Vallier in memory of Saint Valère de Langres. Part of Vallier's spine is kept at the church in Talmay. A stained-glass window at the church depicts the saint's decapitation.
