= List of missionaries to Hawaii =

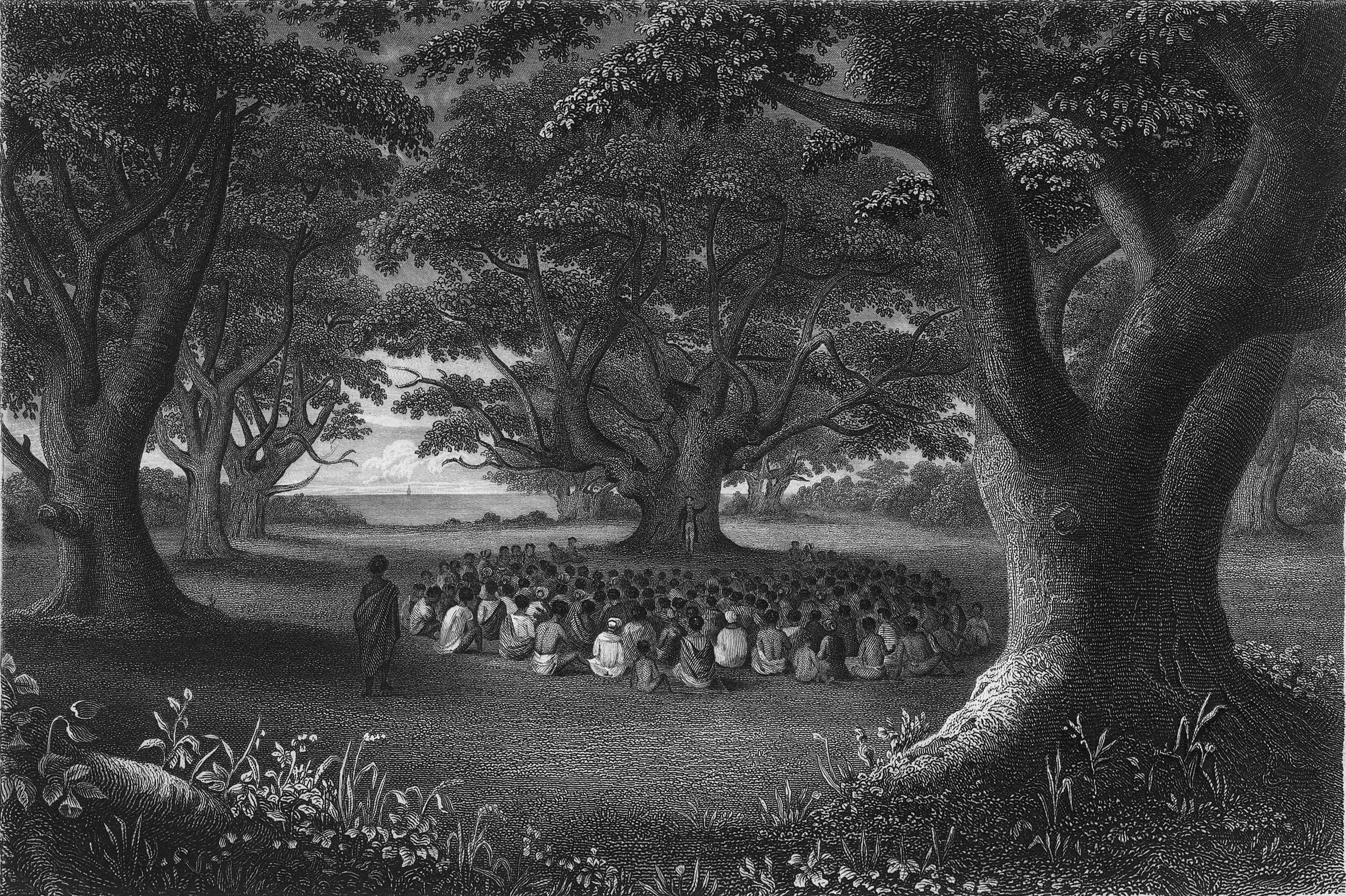
Missionaries preaching under kukui groves, 1841

Before European exploration, the Hawaiian religion was brought from Tahiti by Paʻao according to oral tradition. Notable missionaries with written records are generally Christian.

== Protestant ==
=== American Board of Commissioners for Foreign Missions ===
Several groups were sent from the American Board of Commissioners for Foreign Missions (ABCFM).

The first ABCFM company arrived on March 30, 1820, on the Thaddeus from Boston:

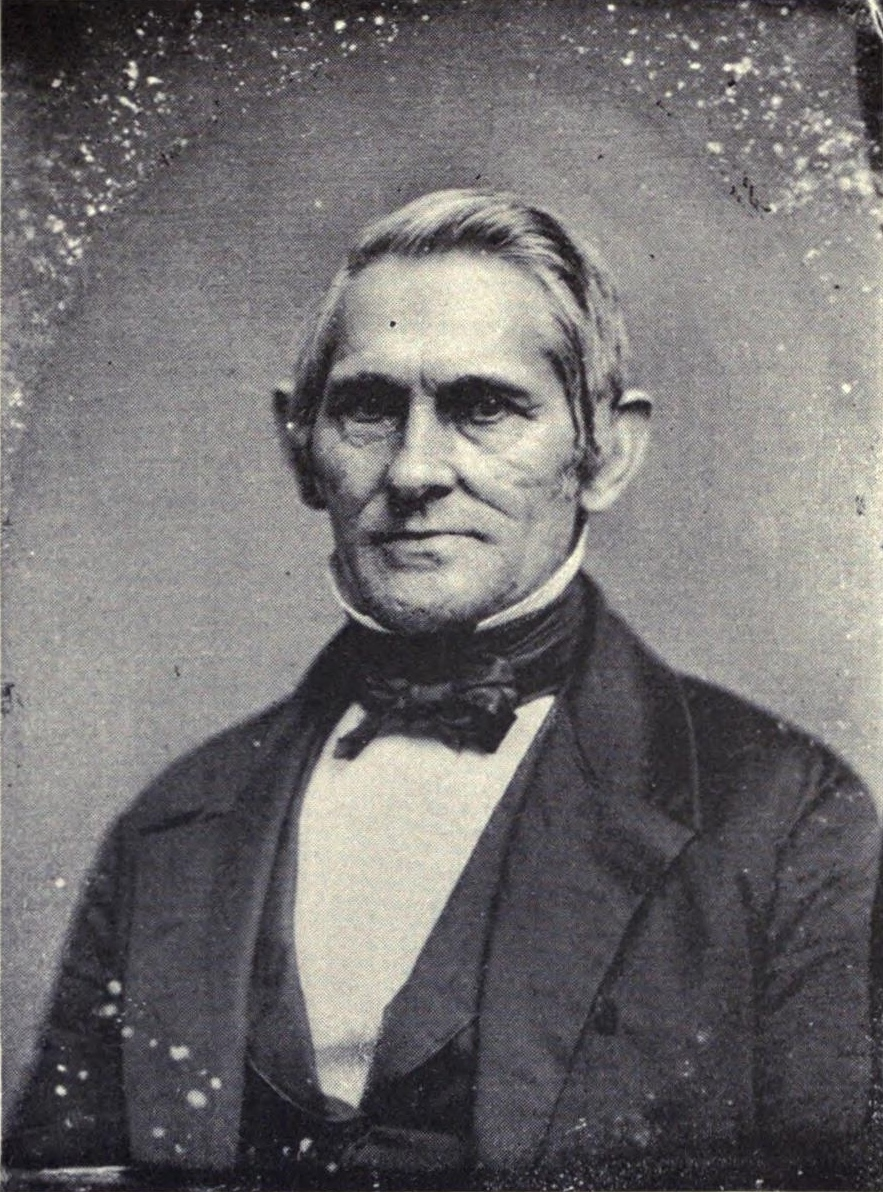
Hiram Bingham I

- Rev. Hiram Bingham I (1789–1869), father of Hiram Bingham II, grandfather of Hiram Bingham III, and great-grandfather of Hiram Bingham IV.
- Sybil Moseley Bingham (1792–1848), wife of Hiram Bingham I
- Rev. Asa Thurston (1787–1868), grandfather of businessman and politician Lorrin A. Thurston
- Lucy Goodale (1795–1876), wife of Asa Thurston
- Dr. Thomas Holman (1793–1826), first missionary physician to Hawaii
- Lucia Ruggles Holman (1793–1886), wife of Thomas Holman; teacher, letter writer

The second ABCFM company arrived on April 23, 1823, on the Thames from New Haven, Connecticut:

- Rev. William Richards (1793–1847)
- Harriet Bradford Tiffany Stewart (1798–1830), wife of Charles Samuel Stewart
- Betsey Stockton (1798–1865), the first African American and unmarried female missionary

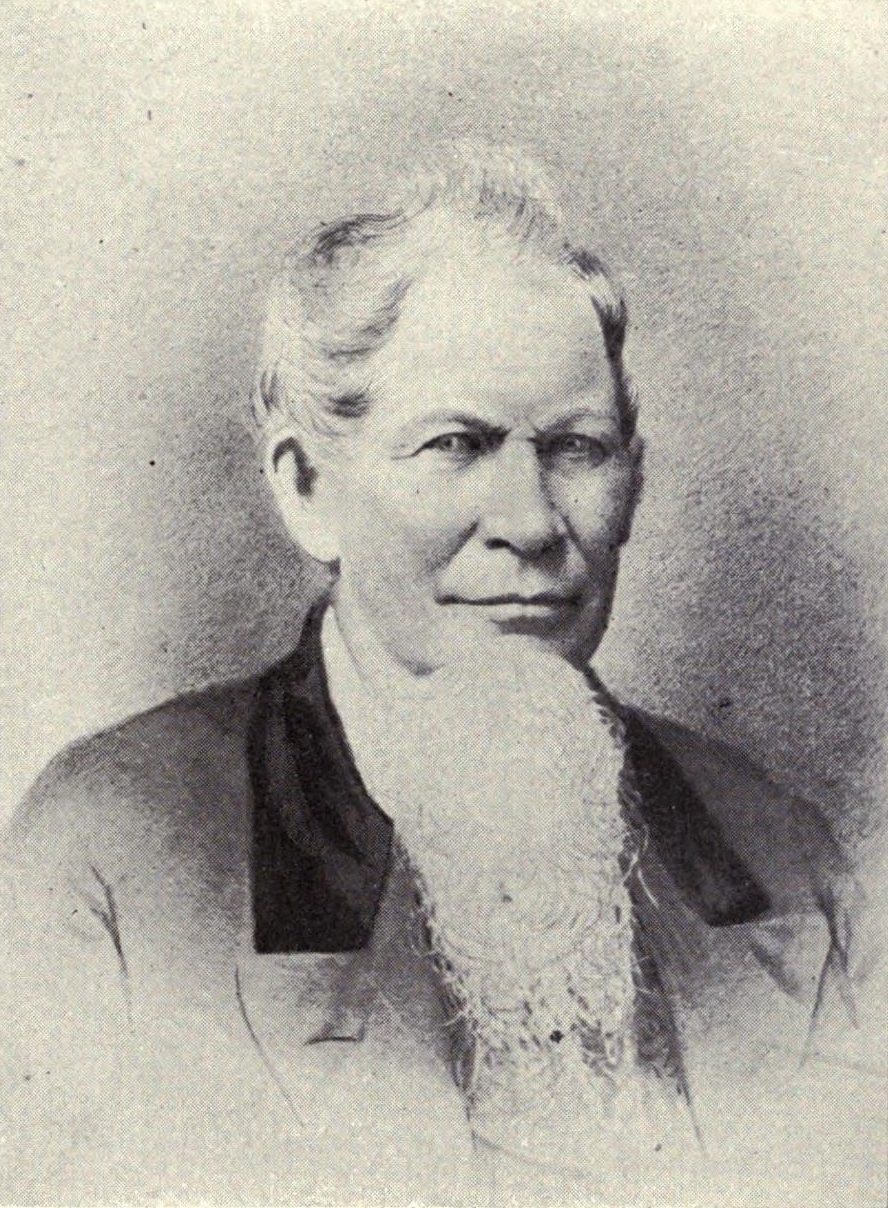
Lorrin Andrews

The third ABCFM company arrived on March 30, 1828, on the Parthian from Boston:

- Rev. Lorrin Andrews (1795–1868), founder of Lahainaluna Seminary and judge
- Rev. Ephraim Weston Clark (1799–1878), third pastor of Kawaiahaʻo Church
- Rev. Jonathan Smith Green (1796–1878), who founded Makawao Union Church
- Rev. Peter Johnson Gulick (1796–1877)
- Dr. Gerrit P. Judd (1803–1873), physician and diplomat
- Laura Fish (1804–1872), wife of Gerrit P. Judd

The fourth ABCFM company arrived June 7, 1831 on the New England from New Bedford:

- Rev. Dwight Baldwin (1798–1886), physician on Maui island
- Charlotte Fowler (1805–1873), wife of Dwight Baldwin
- Rev. Sheldon Dibble (1809–1845), historian and Bible translator

The fifth ABCFM company arrived May 17, 1832 on the Averick from Boston:

- Rev. William Patterson Alexander (1805–1884), whose son founded Alexander & Baldwin
- Rev. Richard Armstrong (1805–1860), various missions, second pastor of Kawaiahaʻo Church
- Clarissa Chapman (1805–1891), wife of Richard Armstrong
- Ursula Sophia Newell (1806–1888), wife of John Smith Emerson
- Rev. Harvey Rexford Hitchcock (1800–1855), who founded the first church on Molokaʻi island
- Rev. David Belden Lyman (1803–1868), who founded the Hilo Boarding School
- Rev. Lorenzo Lyons (1807–1886), who built Imiola Church in Waimea, Hawaii County, Hawaii

The sixth ABCFM company arrived on May 1, 1833, on the Mentor:

- Rev. Lowell Smith
- Mrs. Abigail Willis Tenney Smith (1809–1885), President of the Woman's Board of Missions for the Pacific Islands
- Rev. Benjamin Wyman Parker
- Mrs. Mary Elizabeth Barker Parker
- Rev. John Diell, first seaman's chaplain and first pastor of the Bethel
- Mrs. Caroline Platt Diell
- Lemuel Fuller, printer

The seventh ABCFM company arrived on June 6, 1835, on the Hellespont:

- Rev. Titus Coan (1808–1881), first pastor of Haili Church in Hilo
- Edwin Oscar Hall (1810–1883), printer

The eighth ABCFM company arrived on April 9, 1837, on the Mary Frasier from Boston:

- Edward Bailey (1814–1903), teacher
- Samuel Northrup Castle (1808–1894), who co-founded Castle & Cooke
- Amos Starr Cooke (1810–1871), who founded the Royal School in Honolulu
- Abner Wilcox (1808–1869), teacher

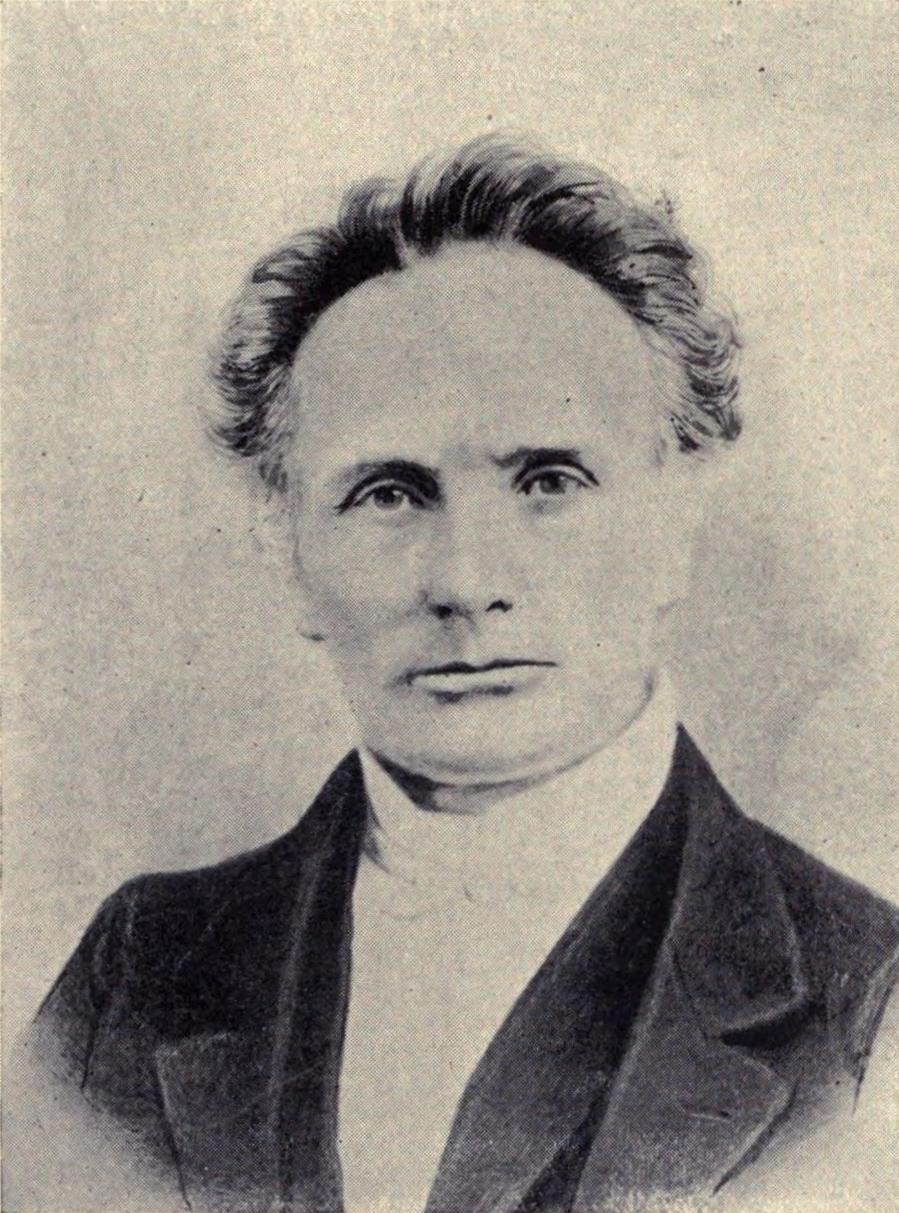
John D. Paris

The ninth ABCFM company arrived on May 21, 1841, on the Gloucester:

- Rev. Elias Bond (1813–1896), founded Kalahikiola Church and Kohala Seminary
- Rev. Daniel Dole (1808–1878), who founded of Punahou School
- Rev. John Davis Paris (1809–1892), who founded Kahikolu Church and Hale Halawai O Holualoa
- William Harrison Rice (1813–1862), teacher
- Mary Sophia Hyde (1816–1911), wife of William Harrison Rice

The tenth ABCFM company arrived on September 24, 1842, on the Sarah Abagail from Boston:

- Rev. Samuel Chenery Damon (1815–1885), publisher of "The Friend". Arrived on October 19, 1842, on the Sarah Abagail from New York:

Arrived on September 21, 1843, from Boston, originally intended on going to Oregon:

- Rev. Asa Bowen Smith (1809–1886)
- Mrs. Melicent Knapp Smith (1816–1891)
- Sarah Gilbert White (1813–1855), wife of Asa Bowen Smith
- Rev. George Berkeley Rowell (1815–1884)
- Mrs. Malvina J. Chapin Rowell (1816–1893)

The eleventh ABCFM company arrived July 15, 1844 on the Globe from Boston:

The twelfth ABCFM company arrived February 26, 1848 on the Samoset from Boston:

- Maria Louisa Walsworth (1822–1858), wife of Henry Kinney and teacher. She married businessman Benjamin Pitman after her husband's death

Arrived in 1854, intended for Micronesia on the Chaica:

- William Cornelius Shipman (1824–1861), stationed in Waiohinu

=== London Missionary Society ===
From the London Missionary Society (deputation of British missionaries and Tahitian teachers on their way to the Marquesas), they arrive from Tahiti on April 16 and returned to Tahiti on August 27, 1822, on the Mermaid:

- Rev, Daniel Tyerman
- Rev. George Bennet
- Rev. William Ellis (1794–1872), who returned on February 4, 1823, on the Active, toured the islands, and published a book about the tour. He left after about eighteen months in the islands.

=== Anglican Church ===
- Bishop Thomas Nettleship Staley (1823–1898), the first Anglican bishop, arrived in 1862.
- Bishop Alfred Willis (1836–1920), the second Anglican bishop, arrived in 1872

=== Other groups ===
- Merriman Colbert Harris (1846–1921), the first Methodist bishop

=== Native Hawaiian Protestant ===
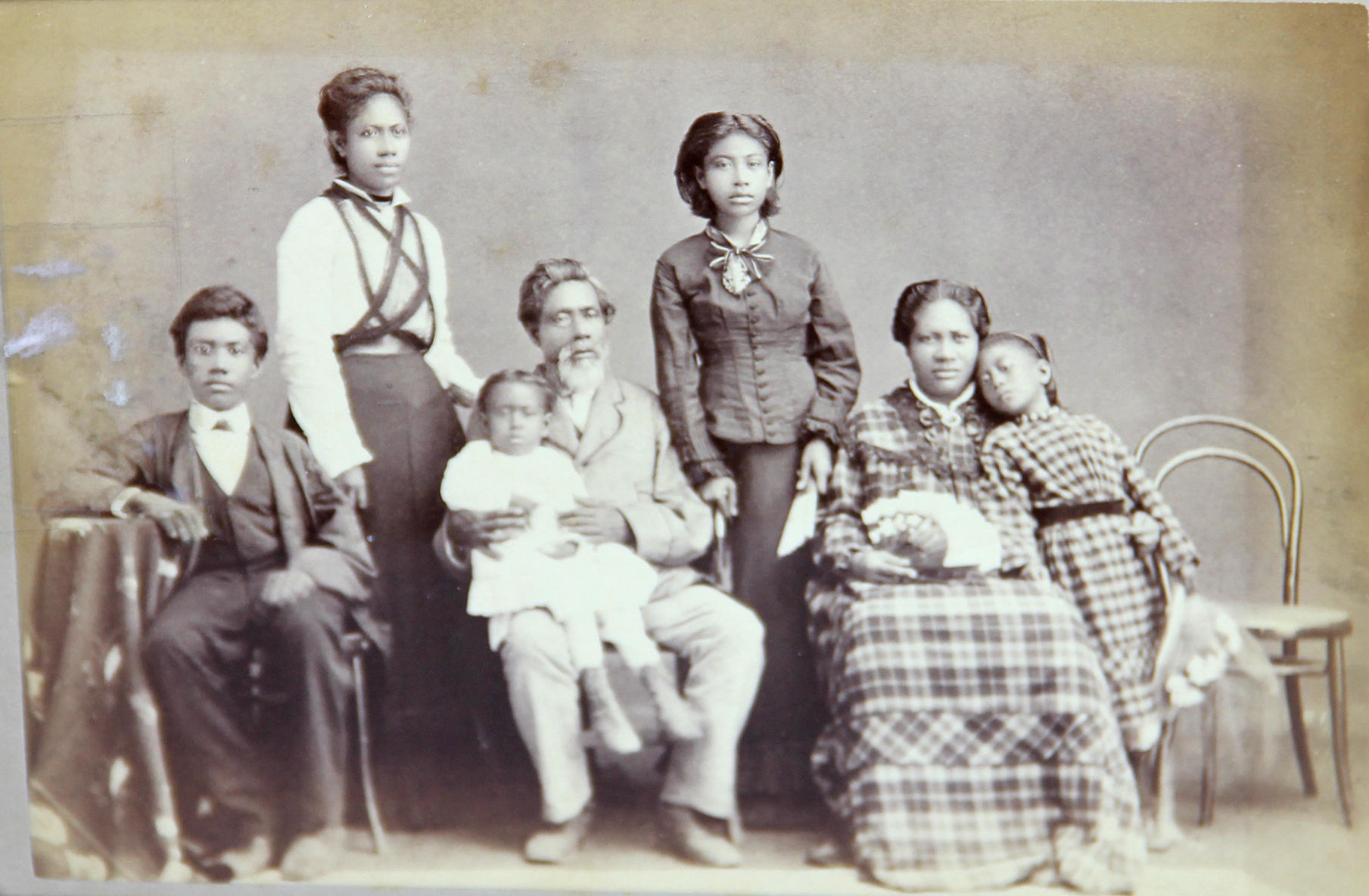
Native Hawaiian missionary family, c. 1878

- David Malo (1793–1853), historian, built Kilolani Church
- Henry Opukahaia, who traveled via China to New England and inspired ABCFM
- James Kekela, first ordained Hawaiian Protestant minister
- Bartimeus Lalana Puaʻaiki, first Hawaiian licensed to preach
- Jonathan Napela, Uaua and Kaleohano, early Mormon converts, who would later serve as prominent missionaries and leaders in the LDS Church.
- William Hoapili Kaʻauwai (1835–1874), only Native Hawaiian to be ordained a priest of the Anglican Church of Hawaii in 1864

=== Tahitian Protestant ===
- Auna, Tahitian teacher

== Latter-day Saints ==
From the Church of Jesus Christ of Latter-day Saints, arriving on December 12, 1850, on the Imaum of Muscat from San Francisco:

- George Q. Cannon (1827–1901).

== Roman Catholic ==
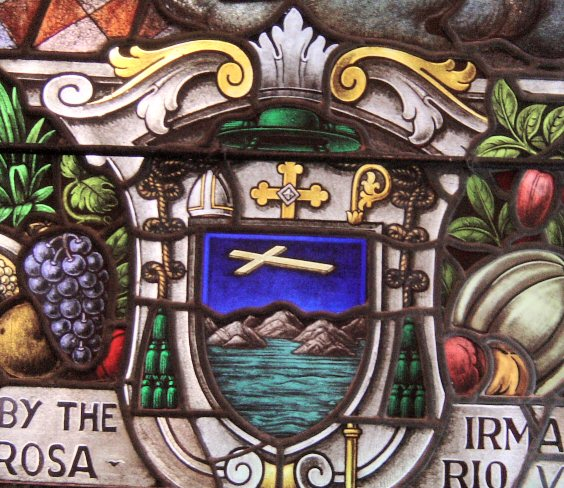
Episcopal arms of Bishop Rouchouze in a window at the Cathedral of Our Lady of Peace, Honolulu

Arrived in 1827 on La Comète from France on an invitation issued by Jean Baptiste Rives:

- Father Alexis Bachelot, SS.CC. (1796–1837), with Fathers Patrick Short, SS.CC., and Abraham Armand, SS.CC., and six lay Brothers of the Congregation

Subsequent bishops and priests:

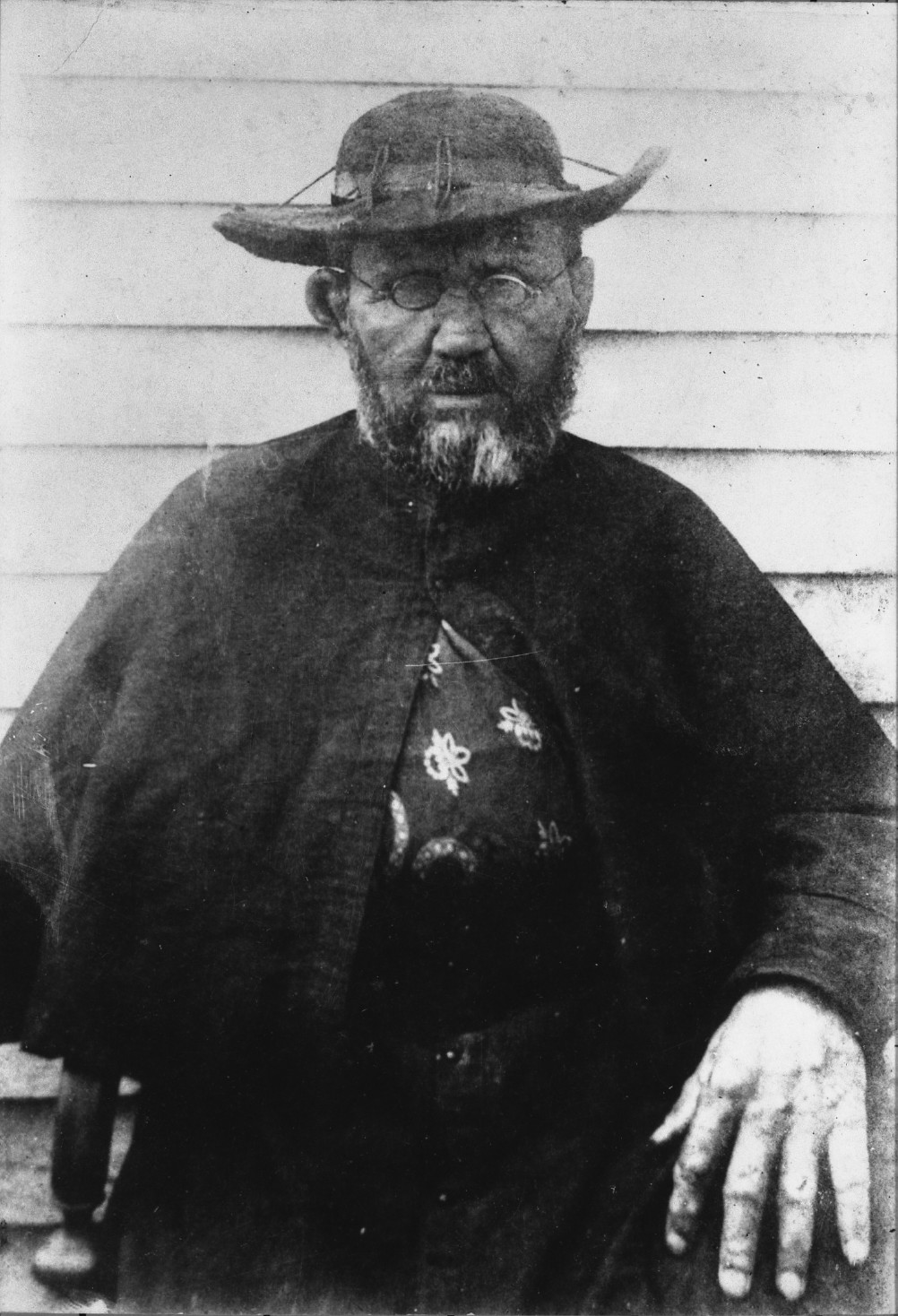
Father Damien, SS.CC., in his later years, already afflicted with Hansen's disease

- Bishop Etienne Jerome Rouchouze, SS.CC. (?–1843), lost at sea
- Bishop Louis Desiré Maigret, SS.CC. (1804–1882)
- Bishop Herman Koeckemann, SS.CC. (1828–1892)
- Bishop Gulstan Ropert, SS.CC. (1839–1903)
- Father Damien de Veuster, SS.CC., (1840–1889), canonized by the Roman Catholic Church in 2009 for dedicating his life to the care of leprosy victims on Molokai, eventually succumbing to the disease himself
- Bishop Libert H. Boeynaems, SS.CC. (1857–1926)
- Bishop Stephen Alencastre, SS.CC. (1876–1940)

Also:

- Mother Marianne Cope, O.S.F., (1838–1918), who led a group of Sisters from her religious congregation in answer to a plea by the King for nursing care of leprosy victims, and who eventually went to Molokai to help Father Damien in his last days and continue his work; beatified by the Catholic Church in 2005, canonized in October 2012
- Brother Joseph Dutton (1843–1931), a lay brother who assisted in Father Damien's work and lived on Molokai from 1886 to his death.
- Sister Leopoldina Burns (1855–1942), O.S.F., companion of Mother Marianne Cope in Molokai who helped care for the lepers and served as educator for girls.

Hawaiian Catholics:

- Helio Koaʻeloa (1815–1846), an early Catholic lay catechist known as the "Apostle of Maui".

== See also ==
- Congregation of the Sacred Hearts of Jesus and Mary
- Church of Hawaii
- Edict of Toleration (Hawaii)
- List of Buddhist temples in Hawaii
- List of Roman Catholic missionaries
- Orthodox Church in Hawaii
- Prefecture Apostolic of the Sandwich Islands
- Roman Catholic Bishop of Honolulu
- The Church of Jesus Christ of Latter-day Saints in Hawaii
- Vicar Apostolic of the Hawaiian Islands
