= Chrysostome Liausu =

French missionary

- Born: 17 March 1807; La Gardelle, Lot, France
- Died: 5 September 1839 (aged 32); Valparaíso, Chile
- Occupation: Missionary

Chrysostome Liausu, SS.CC., (born Charles-Auguste Liausu; 17 March 1807 – 5 September 1839) was a French Catholic priest of the Congregation of the Sacred Hearts of Jesus and Mary, a religious institute of the Roman Catholic Church. He helped start the Roman Catholic mission in the Eastern Oceania and was the Prefect Apostolic of Southern Oceania.

== Biography ==
Liausu was born Charles-Auguste Liausu on 17 March 1807 in La Gardelle, in the Lot department in south-western France. Liausu joined the Congregation of the Sacred Hearts of Jesus and Mary in 1825 and took the name Jean-Chrysostome, presumably after Saint John Chrysostom. He was a cousin of Cyprien Liausu, who also became a Picpus missionary in the Gambier Islands.

Liausu was part of a small group of French Picpus missionaries sent by Pope Gregory XVI and the Propaganda Fide to convert the natives of Eastern Oceania. Their superior Étienne Jérôme Rouchouze was appointed the Vicar Apostolic of Eastern Oceania while Liausu was appointed prefect apostolic of the region south of the equator including the Gambier Islands, the Marquesas Islands, the Tuamotu Islands and the Society Islands and Alexis Bachelot was charged with the region north of the equator (i.e. the Hawaiian Islands). In 1834, Liausu and François Caret, Honoré Laval and Columba Murphy arrived in Valparaíso from Bordeaux. Caret and Laval with Murphy as their assistant were sent to the Gambier Islands while Liausu stayed behind to maintain connection between the missionaries and the Congregation back home and to wait for the arrival of Bishop Rouchouze, who was arriving at a later time. Although initially faced with hostility from Mangareva's King Maputeoa, the three Catholic missionaries managed to land on a small island where the local chief and later Maputeoa's uncle Matua gave them support to learn the Mangareva language and the islanders learned about Christianity. Within one of year of their arrival, the missionaries converted the islanders at Taravai, Aukena and Akamaru to Christianity, established churches, and even made the islanders wear tunics. Maputeoa and his family were baptized on 25 August 1836.

In 1839, he contracted typhus through his work with the Chilean soldiers. Liausu died 5 September 1839 in Valparaíso having never made it to the Gambier Islands.

== Bibliography ==
- Anderson, Robert S. Forsythe (April 1937). "Herman Melville's Father Murphy". Notes & Queries. 177 (16). London: Oxford University Press: 254–58, 272–76.
- Garrett, John (1982). To Live Among the Stars: Christian Origins in Oceania. Suva, Fiji: Institute of Pacific Studies, University of the South Pacific. ISBN 978-2-8254-0692-2.
- Hordern, Miles (2014). Sailing the Pacific: A Voyage Across the Longest Stretch of Water on Earth, and a Journey into Its Past. New York: St. Martin's Press. ISBN 978-1-4668-7196-0.
- Lamy, Etienne (1903). Les missions catholiques françaises au XIXe siècle. Paris: A. Colin.
- Laval, Honoré; Newbury, C. W.; O'Reilly, Patrick (1968). Mémoires pour servir à l'histoire de Mangareva: ère chrétienne, 1834-1871. Paris: Musée de l'Homme.
- Musée Henri-Martin (2009). Atoga no Mangareva: histoire mangarévienne : regards croisés sur le Rongo de Cahors. Cahors: Musée de Cahors Henri-Martin. ISBN 9782951874022.
- Wiltgen, Ralph M. (2010). The Founding of the Roman Catholic Church in Oceania, 1825 to 1850. Eugene, OR: Wipf and Stock Publishers. ISBN 978-1-60899-536-3.
- Yzendoorn, Reginald (1927). History of the Catholic Mission in the Hawaiian Islands. Honolulu: Honolulu Star-Bulletin.
