= Cyprien Liausu =

French Catholic priest

- Born: Antoine Liausu; 20 May 1802; Vaylats, Lot, France
- Died: 29 May 1856 (aged 54); Cahors, Lot, France
- Occupation: Missionary

Cyprien Liausu, SS.CC., (born Antoine Liausu; 20 May 1802 – 29 May 1856) was a French Catholic priest of the Congregation of the Sacred Hearts of Jesus and Mary, a religious institute of the Roman Catholic Church. He headed the Roman Catholic mission in the Gambier Islands from 1835 to 1855.

== Education ==
Liausu was born Antoine Liausu on 20 May 1802 in Vaylats, near the town of Cahors in the Lot department in south-western France. Liausu joined the Congregation of the Sacred Hearts of Jesus and Mary on 7 June 1822 in Paris and served for a period of time as a professor in Poitiers in 1822; Paris in 1825; Rennes in 1828; in 1830. In 1834, he returned to study medicine under noted French physician Joseph Récamier. He was a cousin of Chrysostome Liausu, who was part of the first group of Picpus missionary in the Gambier Islands.

== Career ==
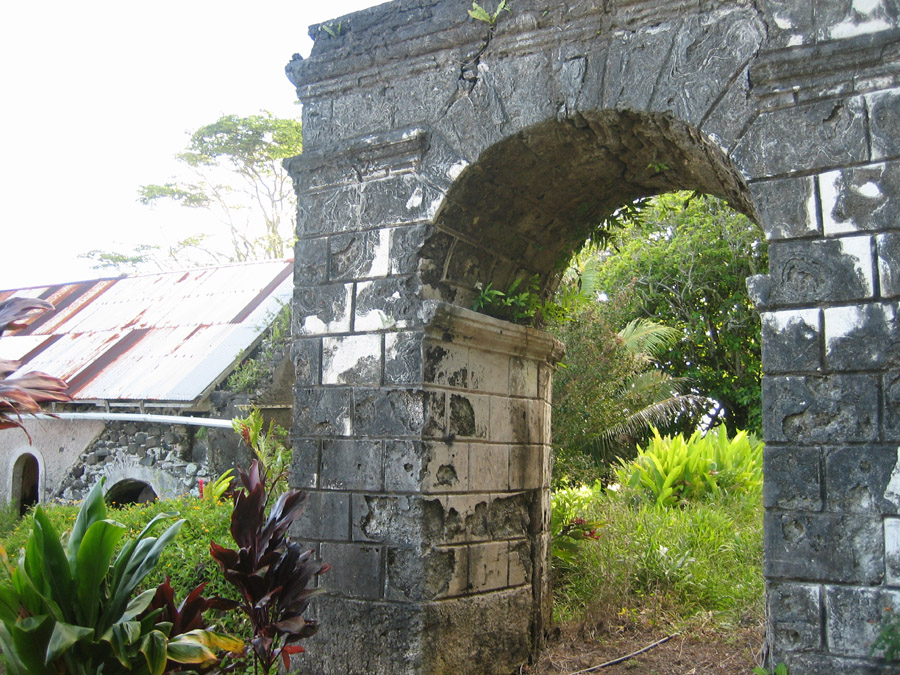
The ruins of Rouru Convent, founded by Father Cyprien Liausu

On 9 May 1835, Cyprien Liausu and Bishop Étienne Jérôme Rouchouze, along with two other priests Louis Désiré Maigret, Frédéric Pages and two catechist brothers: Gilbert Soulié and Fabien Costes and one lay brother Urbain Flerot arrived in the Gambier Islands to assist the Catholic mission initiated by Fathers François Caret and Honoré Laval and their assistant Brother Columba Murphy the previous year. The Picpusien missionaries were successful in converting many of the islanders despite initial hostility from the local rulers. Bishop Rouchouze baptized the native king Maputeoa and his family on 25 August 1836. Maputeoa took the name Gregorio in honor of Pope Gregory XVI who had deputed the missionaries to eastern Oceania.

From 1835 to 1855, Liausu was stationed in Rikitea on the main island of Mangareva and the residence and seat of Maputeoa. He befriended the newly converted ruler and was a co-signer of a request sent by Maputeoa in 1844 requesting that France placed the kingdom under French protectorate. Liausu served as a physician on the island and set up a hospital to treat the sick during a sudden epidemic in Rikitea. Liausu was the first to cultivate sugar cane and giraumont squash on Mangareva and planted coconut trees on the reef of Tekau. Liausu succeeded Caret as head of the mission after the latter left for the Marquesas Islands in 1839. In running the Catholic mission, Liausu and Laval treated the natives very harshly, instituting forced labor to build more than 100 buildings of stone and coral including St. Michael's Cathedral, the largest religious building in the South Pacific. Laval is often credited with the decimation of the indigenous population from 9,000 to just 500, but Liausu was co-responsible for the earlier part of the population decline through these projects. One of Liausu's legacies was the Rouru Convent located at the foot of Mount Duff in Rikitea, which was built to sequester the native women of the islands. He also became its first chaplain.

== Death and burial ==
After years of ministry, Liausu became sick and discouraged; he departed on 15 July 1855, for France without authorization from the Church. The mission was left in the hands of Father Laval while Father Armand Chausson and Sister Thérèse were left in charge of Rouru Convent. He died on 29 May 1856 after returning to his home in Cahors. In 1864, Bishop Tepano Jaussen returned Liausu's remains to Mangareva for burial at the convent he founded, but during the exhumation when the casket was opened, the Rouru sisters found the remains of an old woman with tufts of hair on the top of her head instead of the tonsured priest.

== Bibliography ==
- Garrett, John (1982). To Live Among the Stars: Christian Origins in Oceania. Suva, Fiji: Institute of Pacific Studies, University of the South Pacific. ISBN 978-2-8254-0692-2.
- Laval, Honoré; Newbury, C. W.; O'Reilly, Patrick (1968). Mémoires pour servir à l'histoire de Mangareva: ère chrétienne, 1834–1871. Paris: Musée de l'Homme.
- Musée Henri-Martin (2009). Atoga no Mangareva: histoire mangarévienne : regards croisés sur le Rongo de Cahors. Cahors: Musée de Cahors Henri-Martin. ISBN 9782951874022.
- Kirk, Robert W. (2012). Paradise Past: The Transformation of the South Pacific, 1520–1920. Jefferson, NC: McFarland. ISBN 978-0-7864-6978-9.
- Wiltgen, Ralph M. (2010). The Founding of the Roman Catholic Church in Oceania, 1825 to 1850. Eugene, OR: Wipf and Stock Publishers. ISBN 978-1-60899-536-3.
- Yzendoorn, Reginald (1927). History of the Catholic Mission in the Hawaiian Islands. Honolulu: Honolulu Star-Bulletin.
