= P. humilis =

P. humilis may refer to:

- Phacelia humilis, the low phacelia, a plant species native to the western United States
- Polistes humilis, the common paper wasp, a wasp species found throughout Australia
- Prosopis humilis, a flowering plant species
- Pseudopodoces humilis, the Tibetan ground-tit or Hume's ground-tit, a lark-like bird species found in the north of the Himalayas
