= Saint-Cyr-la-Rosière =

- Commune
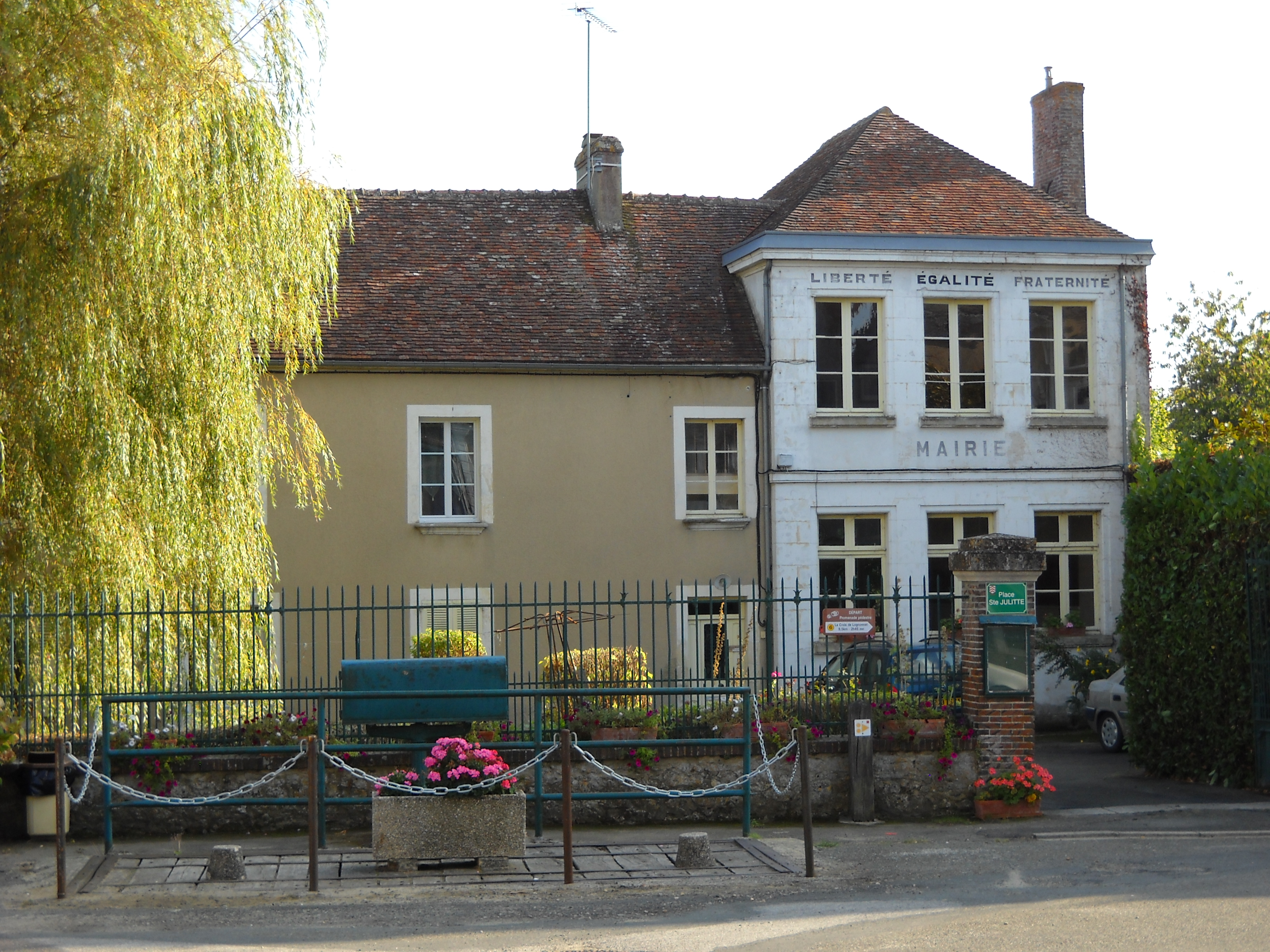
- The town hall in Saint-Cyr-la-Rosière
- Location of Saint-Cyr-la-Rosière
- Location within France Location within Normandy
- Coordinates: 48°19′53″N 0°38′29″E
- Country: France
- Region: Normandy
- Department: Orne
- Arrondissement: Mortagne-au-Perche
- Canton: Bretoncelles
- Intercommunality: Cœur du Perche

Government
  - Mayor (2020–2026): David Coutant
- Area^{1}: 18.75 km^{2} (7.24 sq mi)
- Elevation: 200 m (660 ft)
- Highest elevation: 212 m (696 ft)
- Lowest elevation: 112 m (367 ft)
- Population (2023): 231
  - Density: 12.3/km^{2} (31.9/sq mi)
- Time zone: UTC+01:00 (CET)
  - Summer (DST): UTC+02:00 (CEST)
- INSEE/Postal code: 61379 /61130
- ^{1} French Land Register data, which excludes lakes, ponds, glaciers > 1 km^{2} (0.386 sq mi or 247 acres) and river estuaries.

Saint-Cyr-la-Rosière (French pronunciation: [sɛ̃ siʁ la ʁozjɛʁ]) is a commune in the Orne department in north-western France.

== Geography ==
The commune is made up of the following collection of villages and hamlets, La Mouchère, La Filonnière, Saint-Cyr-la-Rosière, L'Angenardière, Gripe Denier and La Houssaie.

The commune has four watercourses which flow through its borders, La Rozière, La Rougette, Ruisseau de l'étang cochard and the Ruisseau de dame-marie.

== Points of interest ==
- Écomusée du Perche is a Museum of France dedicated to rural heritage of the Perche from the 1800s to 1960. It was first opened in 1972.

=== National heritage sites ===
The Commune has five buildings and areas listed as a Monument historique.

- Sainte-Gauburge priory a thirteenth century former priory that was registered as a monument in 1980.
- Chapel of Clémence a fourteenth century chapel, registered as a Monument historique in 1977.
- La Pierre Procureuse Dolmen is a Neolithic dolmen, registered as a Monument historique in 1930.
- Church of Saint-Cyr and Sainte-Julitte a twelfth century church, registered as a Monument historique in 1978.
- Langenardiere Manor a sixteenth century Manor house, registered as a Monument historique in 1925.

== Notable people ==
- Alexis Bachelot - (1796 - 1837) a Catholic priest best known for his tenure as the first Prefect Apostolic of the Sandwich Islands, was born here.

== See also ==
- Communes of the Orne department
