= Arsenius Walsh =

Irish Catholic priest in Hawaii

Arsenius Walsh, SS.CC., (1804 – 14 October 1869), was an Irish Catholic priest who was among the first Roman Catholic missionaries in the Kingdom of Hawaii. He was a member of the Congregation of the Sacred Hearts of Jesus and Mary, a religious institute based in Paris, better known as the "Picpus Fathers", which had been founded during the turmoil of the French Revolution. He is called the Apostle of Hawaii.

== The Catholic mission to Hawaii ==
The first members of his congregation had arrived in Honolulu, Hawaii, on 9 July 1827, under the leadership of Father Alexis Bachelot, SS.CC., named the first Prefect Apostolic for the region by the Holy See. The Picpus community, composed of both priests and lay brothers, soon began to gain converts among the Native Hawaiians.

This quick success, however, sparked the opposition of the Congregationist missionaries who had arrived from the United States several years earlier and who had been embraced by the chiefs of the kingdom. Encouraged by the Protestant clergy, the chiefs passed laws which imposed heavy penalties, such as forced labor, beatings and imprisonment on their people who embraced Catholic practice. This led to a Catholic underground where the two French priests had to care for their new flock by presiding over private Masses in darkened homes and had to offer catechetical instruction for new converts in secret. The chiefs expelled the priests of the community on Christmas Eve 1831, having them transported to Lower California in Mexico, but allowed the lay brothers to stay. The priests were taken in by the Franciscans there and served at the California missions.

== Walsh's arrival ==
An Irish seminarian in the Hawaiian community, Brother Columba Murphy, SS.CC., still a layman in the eyes of the government, made frequent visits to the mission, continually appraising the situation for the Fathers in Mexico. By the mid-1830s, the political climate in Hawaii had changed. Murphy went to Monterrey to encourage the two priests to return. Unable to locate them, he left a message advising them that the time was ripe. In response to this, Walsh was sent to Hawaii.

Walsh, who might have been born Robert Walsh--a given name often ascribed to him—arrived in Hawaii on 4 September 1836 and established himself with the lay brothers of his congregation. His expulsion was urged by the Protestant clergy, who had the king's ear. Unlike the other Picpus Fathers, however, he was a British subject, and gained the support of the British consul in Hawaii, whose favor was being sought by the kingdom. Consequently, he was permitted to stay, on the condition that he not engage in any proselytization of the native people.

Encouraged by his presence and changes in the island leadership, the two French priests returned to Hawaii the following year. They were joined by another priest of the congregation, Louis Désiré Maigret, who had been appointed as the first Vicar Apostolic of the Sandwich Islands. Opposition and persecution continued, however, and Maigret and another French priest had to leave that following December.

Religious persecution eventually ended after the arrival of a French frigate, L'Artémise, (Note: The sources used here all cite this ship as the one Laplace sailed. The entry on him here, however, states that his ship was La Favorite.) captained by Cyrille Pierre Théodore Laplace, in the process of circumnavigating the world. He had been given instructions by the French government to protect the French residents of Hawaii and to ensure the free exercise of the Catholic faith. Laplace presented King Kamehameha III with an ultimatum, demanding these steps with a monetary surety for compliance, otherwise threatening bombardment of the island. Consequently, the king issued the Edict of Toleration, which led to the free practice of the Catholic Church in Hawaii.

== Mission to Kauai ==
In 1841, with the successful establishment of a congregation in Honolulu, Walsh was sent to establish a mission on the island of Kauai, a recently conquered island in the kingdom. He landed on 22 December and was given a warm welcome by various people on the island. He celebrated the first Mass on the island on Christmas Day, under a tree in the village of Koloa, by which he inaugurated the Mission of St. Raphael. Walsh then began classes of instruction in the faith and opened a school at the mission, following which he set out on a tour of the island to expand his mission to the surrounding population. He was able to have a small stone chapel built on the site by the following March.

On this island, however, Walsh encountered the same hostility and persecution which had taken place on Oahu. The chiefess of the island, Kekauʻōnohi, was a staunch Protestant, and, while not taking any open steps, did not interfere when lower chiefs would imprison and impose heavy penalties on those who established ties with the mission. His energy was thus divided between preaching the Gospel to the populace and defending his followers against the local chiefs.

Despite this opposition, and the eventual failure of some of his missions on the island, Walsh spent the next six years establishing churches and schools around the island, including the Saint Raphael Catholic Church, which began in 1843. He even extended his mission to the island of Niihau in 1842, celebrating the first Mass there on 31 July. He returned to Oahu either in 1848 or in 1859.

== Death ==
Walsh returned to Oahu, where he became the pastor of Ahuimanu. It was there that he died on 14 October 1869.
