= Columba Murphy =

19th-century French Roman-Catholic missionary

Columba Murphy, SS.CC. (born James Murphy; 1806 – by 1848) was a French Catholic priest of the Congregation of the Sacred Hearts of Jesus and Mary, a religious institute of the Roman Catholic Church. He helped found the Roman Catholic mission in the Gambier Islands and was one of the first Catholic missionaries to arrive in the Kingdom of Hawaii during the persecution by Kaʻahumanu, Kamehameha III and their American Congregationalist advisors.

== Biography ==
Born James Murphy in 1806, he was a native Dundalk, Ireland. He was apprenticed to a carpenter, and later became a choir brother in Society of Picpus. Murphy was educated in an Irish college to become a priest, although he was never fully ordained before he left to engage in missionary work in the Pacific. With a British passport, he left for Bordeaux in 1833 and arrived in Valparaíso as part of the first group of Catholic missionaries sent to convert the Pacific Islands in 1834. On August 7, 1834, Father François Caret and Father Honoré Laval with Murphy serving as their assistant and catechists founded the Roman Catholic mission in the Gambier Islands, the first in the Pacific Islands, after landing on the island of Akamaru.

In 1835, Murphy was sent periodically to Hawaii by Father Alexis Bachelot, SS.CC., the Apostolic Prefect of Hawaii, who was living in exile in Lower California, to evaluate the situation which the Roman Catholic Church had found itself in the Hawaiian Islands. As a seminarian, still technically a layman, he was allowed to enter the kingdom, from which the priests of his Order were barred. It was during these visits that he came to determine that the time was right for the priests to return and establish their presence in the mission, which had been maintained by the lay brothers who had been allowed to remain.

Under the leadership of his compatriot, Arsenius Walsh, SS.CC., the Irish members of the missions, through their position as British subjects, ultimately became instrumental in the securing of religious freedom for Roman Catholics in Hawaii. This was later reinforced through the military threats of a French frigate engaged in exploration, under the command of Cyrille Pierre Théodore Laplace, which resulted in the Edict of Toleration forced upon the king.

Murphy continued assisting the Catholic mission in the Pacific working in the Gambier Islands, Hawaii, Monterey, California, Tahiti, the Marquesas Islands. In 1837, he was officially ordained as a priest in the Gambier Islands. Murphy was recalled to France in 1843 and left the congregation and returned to Ireland. Presumably, he died around 1844 or 1845.

In 1842, while in Papeete, Murphy met American author Herman Melville. Melville would later base his character Father Murphy from his book Omoo on him.

He wore a sort of yellow flannel morning-gown, and a broad-brimmed Manilla hat. Large and portly, he was also hale and fifty; with a complexion like an autumnal leaf, handsome blue eyes, fine teeth, and a racy Milesian brogue. In short, he was an Irishman; Father Murphy by name; and, as such, pretty well known, and very thoroughly disliked, throughout all the Protestant missionary settlements in Polynesia. In early youth, he had been sent to a religious seminary in France; and, taking orders there, had but once or twice afterward revisited his native land.

== Resources ==
- French in Hawaii by Hawaii History
