= Patrick Short (priest) =

Catholic priest and missionary to Hawai'i

Patrick Short was a Roman Catholic priest who is best known for his role in the first Catholic mission in the Kingdom of Hawaii. He was a member of the Congregation of the Sacred Hearts of Jesus and Mary, a Catholic religious institute. Short was of Anglo-Irish descent.

== Biography ==
Short left for Hawaii from Bordeaux in 1826, along with and Abraham Armand, Alexis Bachelot, and several lay brothers. They arrived in Honolulu on July 7, 1827. Kaʻahumanu, the Queen Regent of Hawaii, viewed them with disdain due to her theological disagreements with them as well as her desire for national unity. Many of the Hawaiian chiefs were skeptical of the group because they suspected that they were covert agents of the government of France. Though he was a British citizen, Short spoke little English. After settling on the island, the group quietly spent much of their time studying Hawaiian. Short was, however, able to baptize several Hawaiians and teach them Catholic doctrine.

By 1831, Kaʻahumanu had decided to force the Catholic priests to leave Hawaii. Richard Charlton, the British Consul in Hawaii, attempted to persuade Kaʻahumanu to allow Short to remain on the island due to his British citizenship. His efforts were unsuccessful and she would not allow Short to remain. Bachelot and Short were deported from Hawaii in December 1831.

They arrived in San Pedro, Los Angeles in January 1832 and then traveled to the Mission San Gabriel Arcángel. While Bachelot stayed at San Gabriel, Short left for the San Carlos Mission in Monterey, California. There he taught Mathematics and nursed sick students. There he became a friend and traveling partner of William Edward Petty Hartnell. He also worked at the Seminario del Patrocinio de San Jose that Hartnell founded opened.

After serving in Mexico until 1837, Bachelot and Short returned to Hawaii. The Hawaiian chiefs again attempted to expel them and Charlton again furiously protested on Short's behalf. Short was forbidden to preach and left Hawaii in September 1837. He traveled to Valparaíso, leaving Hawaii separately from Bachelot. He lived in Valparaíso until he died in 1870.

== Bibliography ==
- Dakin, Susana (1949), The Lives of William Hartnell, Stanford University Press, ISBN 978-0-8047-1424-2
- Garrett, John (1982), To live among the stars: Christian origins in Oceania, Institute of Pacific Studies, ISBN 978-2-8254-0692-2
- Kuykendall, Ralph Simpson (1938), The Hawaiian Kingdom, University of Hawaii Press, ISBN 978-0-87022-431-7
- Martin, Kathleen J. (2010), Indigenous symbols and practices in the Catholic Church: visual culture, missionization, and appropriation, Ashgate Publishing, ISBN 978-0-7546-6631-8
- Older, Fremont (1938), California Missions and Their Romances, Coward-McCann, ISBN 978-1-4179-8642-2
- Tabrah, Ruth M. (1984), Hawaii: a history, W. W. Norton & Company, ISBN 978-0-393-30220-2
