= Saint Raphael Catholic Church (Koloa, Hawaii) =

Church building in Koloa, HI, United States

Coordinates: 21.8938167°N 159.4575086°W

The present sanctuary of St. Raphael's Church in Koloa, Kauai (Hawaii) was constructed in 1856 and renovated in 1936.

Saint Raphael Catholic Church in Koloa is a parish of the Roman Catholic Church of Hawaii in the United States. Located in Koloa on the island of Kauai, the church falls under the jurisdiction of the Diocese of Honolulu and its bishop. It is named after Saint Raphael.

The oldest Catholic Church in Kauai, St. Raphael's was founded in 1841 by Father Arsenius Walsh. It was founded two years after Catholics were granted religious freedom in Hawaii after the French threatened Honolulu. The church building was completed in 1854. It was enlarged and renovated in 1936.

The stone chapel built by Father Walsh in 1842 was rebuilt by parishioners in 1941 in preparation for the Parish Centennial anniversary.
