= Apostolic Vicariate of Eastern Oceania =

Catholic missionary jurisdiction in the Pacific (1833-1848)

The Vicariate Apostolic of Eastern Oceania was a Catholic missionary jurisdiction for some of the South Sea (Pacific) islands from 1833 till 1848.

== History ==
The whole of Oceania had at first been entrusted by the Congregation Propaganda Fide to the Congregation of the Sacred Hearts of Jesus and Mary (1825); but the territory proving too large, the western portion was afterwards formed into an Apostolic vicariate and given to the Society of Mary (1836), Bishop Pompallier being appointed Apostolic Vicar of Western Oceania.

In 1842, Propaganda Fide created the Apostolic Vicariate of Central Oceania, comprising the colonial island states of New Caledonia, Tonga, Samoa and Fiji Islands. By a further subdivision, the vicariate included only the Tonga Islands, the Wallis Island, Futuna and Niue. The Tonga Islands extend from 15° to 22° S. lat. and from 173° to 176° W. long. Niue is three hundred miles to the east. The Wallis Island lie in 13° S. lat. and 178° W. long.; Futuna, in 40° 14' S. lat. and 179° 33' W. long. These archipelagos were divided among several more or less constitutional monarchies; the Kingdoms of Tonga, Niue, Wallis and the two Kingdoms of Futuna. Tonga and Niue were under British protectorate, Wallis and Futuna under French.

Freedom of worship was theoretically recognised everywhere except in Niue, which is exclusively Protestant. Wallis and Futuna were entirely Catholic. In Tonga there were Catholics, Methodists belonging to the Sydney conference, independent Methodists forming a national Church, some Anglicans, Adventists and Mormons.

=== Statistics ===
The total population in the early 20th century was 34,000, with 9200 Catholics. There were 35 churches; 21 European and 1 local Marist priests and 3 local diocesan priests; 28 schools with 2039 children, two colleges and a seminary. There were annual retreats for the priests, for the sisters and for the catechists, besides general retreats for the faithful about every two years.

The establishments for girls were under the care of 52 Sisters of the Third Order of Mary. The boys' schools were conducted by local lay teachers; the colleges and the seminary by priests. The islands were divided into districts, with resident missionaries who assembled every month for an ecclesiastical conference.

In each village there was a sodality of men (Kan Apositolo) and another of women (Fakafeao). The yearly number of baptisms averaged 310; of marriages, 105.

=== Martyr ===
The vicariate has given to the Church the proto-martyr of Oceania, Saint Peter Chanel.

== Apostolic Vicars ==
Bishop Bataillon was the first vicar Apostolic, succeeded by Bishop Lamaze, after whose death (1906) succeeded (1910) his coadjutor, Bishop Amand Olier, S.M., as vicar Apostolic. Bishop Etienne Jerome Rouchouze

== See also ==
- Apostolic Prefecture of the Sandwich Islands
- Apostolic Vicariate of the Hawaiian Islands
- List of Catholic dioceses in the Pacific Episcopal Conference

== Sources and external links ==
- Catholic Hierarchy
- GCatholic.org
