= Abraham Armand =

First Catholic missionary in Hawaii

Abraham Armand was a priest of the Congregation of the Sacred Hearts of Jesus and Mary, a religious institute of the Roman Catholic Church. He was one of the first Catholic missionaries to arrive in the Kingdom of Hawaii, arriving in 1827 in the company of Alexis Bachelot, Patrick Short and six lay brothers. He became instrumental in the establishment of the Hawaii Catholic Church.
