= Lucia Ruggles Holman =

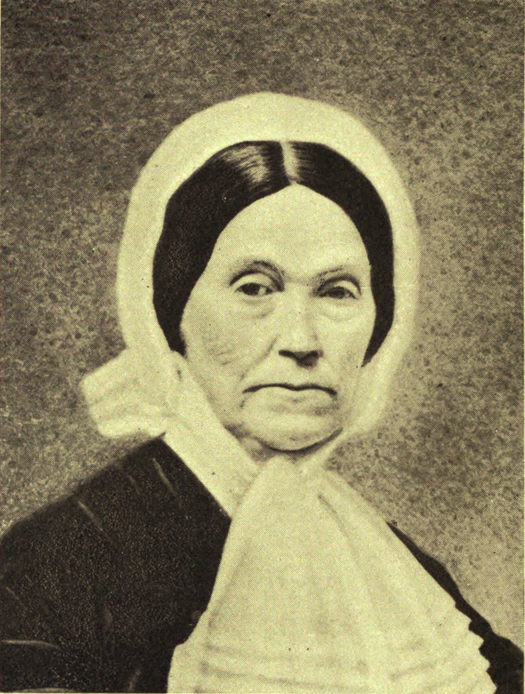
Lucia Ruggles Holman Tomlinson (1866)

Lucia Ruggles Holman (née Ruggles; after first marriage, Holman; after second marriage, Tomlinson; 1793–1886) was an American teacher and letter writer. She was the last survivor of the first missionary company to the Sandwich Islands. Holman was first American woman to sail around the world.

== Early life and education ==
Lucia Ruggles was born in Brookfield, Connecticut, on October 12, 1793. Her siblings included Samuel Ruggles, the missionary, as well as Mrs. Thirza Clinton, Mrs. Huldah Keeler, Mrs. Lodemia Northrup, and Mrs. Marcia Williams.

She received her education at the common school in her native town and at the Young Ladies' Seminary at New Haven, Connecticut.

== Career ==
Her desire was to become a teacher, and her ambition was realized. She established a school for young ladies at Cooperstown, New York. It was at that place she met Dr. Thomas Holman, who had recently commenced the practice of medicine, and they were married September 26, 1819.

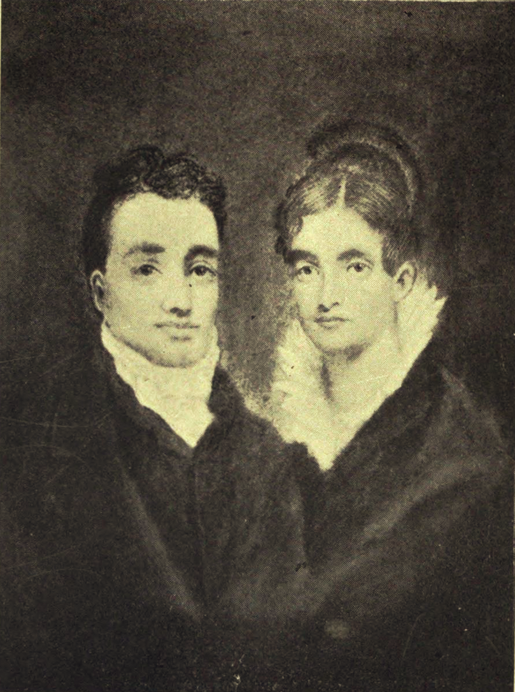
Dr. and Mrs. Thomas Holman (Lucia Ruggles), from a painting by S. F. K. Morse, New York. (1819)

Her brother, Samuel Ruggles, persuaded them to join the missionary company about to start for the Hawaiian Islands. Before sailing in 1819, they sat for their portraits, which were painted on one canvas by Prof. Samuel F. B. Morse, who at that time had a studio in Boston, for Morse was an artist before he was the inventor of the telegraph.

Mrs. Holman's letters to her brothers and sisters, written on shipboard during the long journey, are historically interesting, as she was a keen observer of all natural phenomena. The Holmans’ daughter Lucia Kamāmalu (whose name was given to her by Queen Kamāmalu) was born in Hawaii.

Dr. Holman, born in 1781, was a graduate of the medical school located at Cherry Valley, New York. As the physician of the first missionary company to Hawaii, he became a great favorite with Kamehameha II, who, it is said, would like to have adopted him as his son. Circumstances made it necessary that Dr. Holman and family should return to the U.S. after a brief time, and free passage was given them to the U.S. by way of China and the Cape of Good Hope in 1822. Until his death in 1826, Dr. Holman and family resided at Bridgeport, Connecticut.

== Personal life ==
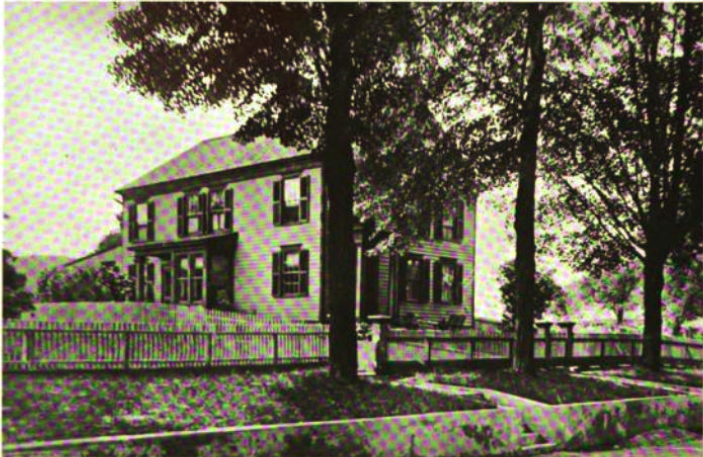
Lucia Ruggles Holman Tomlinson home (Brookfield, Connecticut, 1922)

After she became a widow, Holman returned to her native town, Brookfield, and married Daniel Tomlinson, at one time, Connecticut state senator. Their home was the house later occupied by Mr. C. E. Vroman of Brookfield Iron Works. Here, in 1863, Mr. Tomlinson died at the age of 87 years.

Holman afterward removed to New Milford, Connecticut, to reside with her only daughter, Mrs. Hiram Noble. She retained to extreme old age her active mind and faculties, though blind in her last years. A young great-granddaughter was accustomed to lead Holman around the house.

Lucia Holman Tomlinson died in New Milford, Connecticut, in 1886, being 93 years of age, and was buried on Laurel Hill, Brookfield.

The three children of Thomas and Lucia Holman were:

1. Lucia Kamamalu Holman, born on the Island of Kauai. She was named in honor of the queen. In 1839, she married Hiram D. Noble of New Milford, Connecticut. This family was the custodian of many valuable heirlooms which came to them from Lucia Ruggles Holman, among them, the feather cape presented to Mrs. Holman by the regent queen, Kaahumanu, made from the feathers of the bird Mohonobilis.
2. Thomas Spencer Holman, married Mary J. Trowbridge of New York City.
3. Eli Holman, died at Honolulu when a young man.
