= Thomas Holman (missionary) =

American missionary physician to Hawaii (1793–1826)

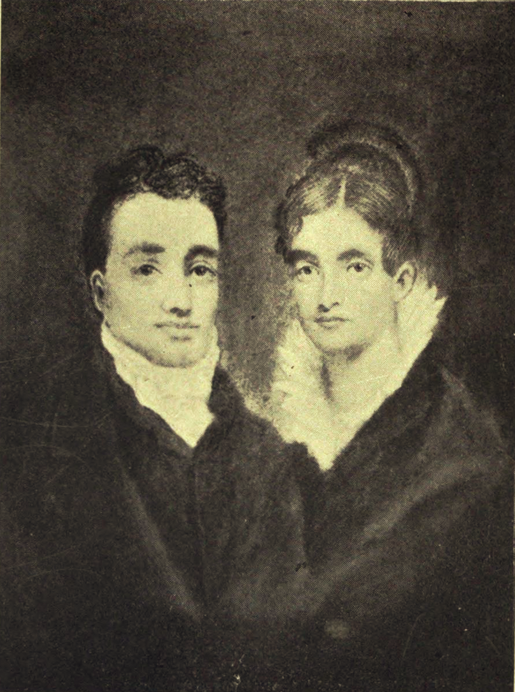
- Born: November 16, 1793; Sandisfield, Massachusetts, US
- Died: November 20, 1826 (aged 33)
- Education: Cherry Valley Medical School
- Occupation: Missionary Physician
- Years active: 1819-1821
- Known for: First missionary physician to the Kingdom of Hawaii
- Spouse: Lucia Ruggles Holman (married 1819)
- Children: 3

Thomas Holman (November 16, 1793 – November 20, 1826) was an American doctor and Protestant missionary, and the first missionary physician to the Kingdom of Hawaii. He worked as a missionary from 1819 until 1821, when he returned to Boston with his wife, Lucia Ruggles Holman, and their daughter, Lucia Kamāmalu Holman.

He travelled to Hawaii with the Pioneer Company sent to the islands by the American Board of Commissioners for Foreign Missionaries. He and his wife became controversial figures amongst the mission, leading to Holman's excommunication from the mission and his family's eventual return to the United States in 1822.

== Life ==
Thomas Holman was born November 16, 1793, to Thomas Holman and Huldah Flint in Sandisfield, Massachusetts. He was the oldest of ten siblings, with 6 sisters and 3 brothers born between 1795 and 1811.

He attended the Cherry Valley Medical School in Otsego County, New York, after which he practiced medicine in Cooperstown. There, he met his future wife, Lucia Ruggles. The two intended to marry, but lacked the financial resources to support themselves, as Thomas's medical practice had struggled in the year since his graduation from medical school. However, Lucia's brother, Samuel Ruggles, was working with the American Board of Commissioners for Foreign Missionaries, which was planning a mission to Hawaii. The company still lacked a physician, and the position was offered to Holman, who accepted. The mission required those who travelled to the islands to be married, and with the mission supporting them, Thomas and Lucia were married at her home on September 26, 1819 in Brookfield, Connecticut.

== Missionary work ==
After their marriage, Holman and his wife departed for Boston, where the Pioneer Company was making preparations for their departure. The group left for Hawaii on the brig Thaddeus on October 24, 1819. After more than 5 months at sea, the group arrived at Kailua-Kona, Hawai'i on April 4, 1820. Upon the Company's arrival, the King requested that Holman and his wife stay while the rest of the mission family travels to Oahu. They agreed to stay, with fellow missionary Asa Thurston staying with them as well.

Here, Holman cared both for fellow members of the mission and many natives on the islands, especially the ali'i, the class of Hawaiian nobility. Over the course of his service, he came to be respected by the king, who saw his medical skills as helpful and potentially valuable for the natives to learn from. He was frequently called on by members of the ali'i to care for various illnesses, supposedly including an instance in which the King, Kamehameha II, requested that he attempt to save one of his close friends, the captain of his guard, who was already deathly ill. Although he was unable to save him, his efforts were seen as a sign of good faith and gained him much respect among the ali'i, helping to make the Hawaiian ruling class more open to and interested in Western medicine.

Despite his medical service, conflict gradually arose between the Holmans and the rest of the mission, as they were seen as being less religiously committed to the mission, with the two often discussing a desire for a break from their work and a chance to return home. Additionally, in part because of their isolation from the rest of the group, they were somewhat socially ostracized. After continuing conflicts and reprimands, they were eventually excommunicated from the mission. They returned to Boston from Hawaii in 1821 on a whaleship, the Mentor. During this return journey, which travelled via China and the Cape of Good Hope, Lucia Ruggles Holman is believed to have become the first American woman to circumnavigate the globe.

== Legacy ==
Thomas Holman died on November 20, 1826 in Bridgeport, Connecticut. He had three children, including one daughter, Lucia Kamāmalu Holman (March 2, 1821 - August 19, 1899), whose middle name was given to her by Queen Kamāmalu when she was born in Hawaii, and two sons, Thomas Spencer Holman (March 4, 1823 - April 8, 1899) and Eli Ruggles Holman (February 20, 1825 - November 6, 1852).
