= François Caret =

French Catholic priest

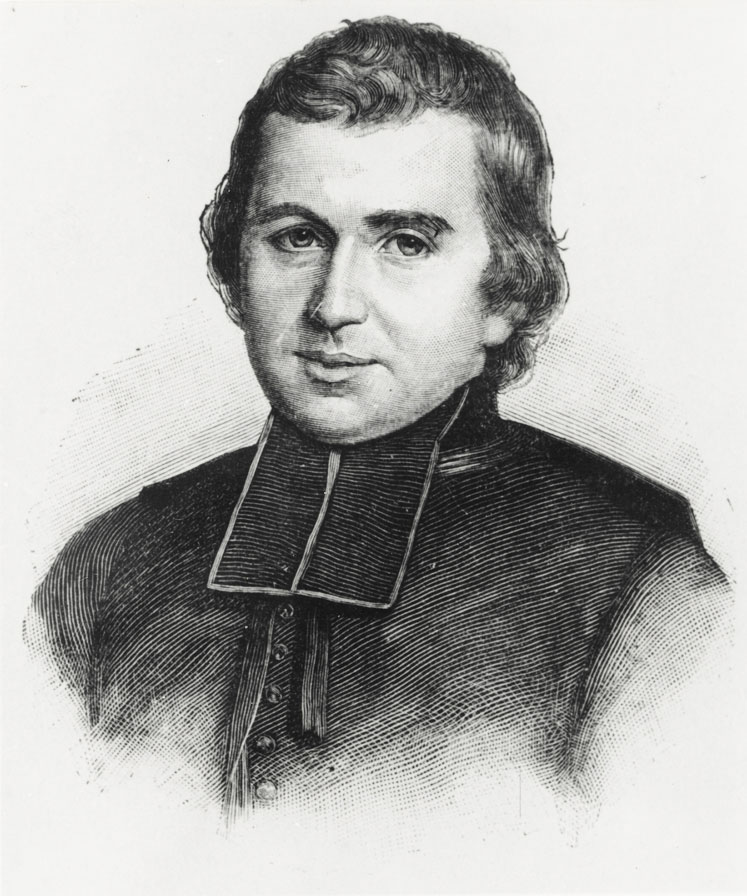
Father Caret

François d'Assise Caret, SS.CC., (born François Toussaint Caret; 4 July 1802 – 26 October 1844) was a French Catholic priest of the Congregation of the Sacred Hearts of Jesus and Mary, a religious institute of the Roman Catholic Church.

== Life ==
François d'Assise Caret was born 4 July 1802 in Miniac-sous-Bécherel (Ille-et-Vilaine). He was already a priest by 1829, when he became a professed member of the Congregation of the Sacred Hearts of Jesus and Mary. In February 1834, he sailed from Bordeaux for Valparaiso with Father Honoré Laval.

Advised by one Captain Mauruc that Protestant missionaries had not yet reached the Gambier archipelago, they took passage on the Peruvian, out of Boston, and arrived 8 August on Akamaru, where they found a representatives of the London Missionary Society already established. Caret and Laval established a thriving mission and planned to expand their work to Tahiti.

They arrived in the Kingdom of Tahiti in February 1836, where the American consul, Moerenhout provided them shelter. Born in Belgium, Moerenhout worked for a time in Valaparaiso for the Dutch consul, before taking ship for Tahiti as supercargo with the additional title of French consul. He arrived there in 1829 and made a fortune selling contraband run, gin, and brandy which Queen Pōmare IV had banned on the advice of British missionary George Pritchard. On his way back to France in 1834, Moerenhout stopped in Boston, and subsequently returned to Tahiti with the title Consul of the United States. The British considered him a secret agent for King Louis Philippe I and the Jesuits.

Although received courteously, by the Protestant Queen Pōmare IV, they were subsequently expelled on the advice of Pritchard. On 12 November the two missionaries and a civilian carpenter who had accompanied them, were forcibly deported. The French Foreign Office regarded this as an "unjustified violent act". The three returned to the Gambiers.

George Pritchard was appointed British Consul for Tahiti in 1837. That same year Caret returned to France in search of additional resources. On 30 May 1838, he embarked on the Zelima out of Bordeaux with four other priests, two catechists, and a shipment of clothes provided by the ladies of France. He left Valparaiso aboard The Eagle, and arrived in Akamaru on 20 December.

Caret and Bishop Rouchouze arrive in the Marquesas on 3 February 1839, but their efforts there met with little success. In 1840, Caret was appointed to succeed Chrysostome Liausu as Prefect Apostolic of Southern Oceania.

In December 1841, Caret was in Papeete, Tahiti, where he contracted smallpox during an epidemic. Efforts to establish a mission in Tahiti were hampered by the government, but by autumn 1842 Caret built a house out of dried brick, which Herman Melville visited that same year. The house burned down on the evening of 30 June 1844. Caret was convinced the cause was arson. The small nearby chapel was also consumed, as well as manuscripts of all the work done on the language of Tahiti and the Marquesas, including a catechism, prayers and a Tahitian language dictionary.

Karl Rensch points outs the language difficulties. When Caret sought to explain the Trinity, saying that there is one God; (but) there are three persons in God, he said, "E atua ko tahi noti - E tora mea atua". The people understood this as "There is one (Great) God - there are three small gods." As they took this as a reference to the three archangels, it did not apparently hamper their conversion.

Caret died of consumption at the age of forty-two on 26 October 1844 in Rikitea while making his way back to Bordeaux. He was buried at the St. Michael's Cathedral in a crypt before the altar.

== Bibliography ==
- Garrett, John (1982). To Live Among the Stars: Christian Origins in Oceania. Suva, Fiji: Institute of Pacific Studies, University of the South Pacific. ISBN 978-2-8254-0692-2.
- Laval, Honoré; Newbury, C. W.; O'Reilly, Patrick (1968). Mémoires pour servir à l'histoire de Mangareva: ère chrétienne, 1834-1871. Paris: Musée de l'Homme.
- Montrond, Maxime de (1869). Les missions en Océanie au XIXe siècle. Rouen: Megard et ce.
- Stanley, David (1999). South Pacific Handbook. David Stanley. ISBN 978-1-56691-172-6.
