= Ecclesiastical conference =

An Ecclesiastical conference is a meetings of Roman Catholic clerics for the purpose of discussing, in general, matters pertaining to their state of life in particular, questions of moral theology and liturgy.

They were prescribed in England by the Council of Exeter in 1131 and the Council of London in 1237.
