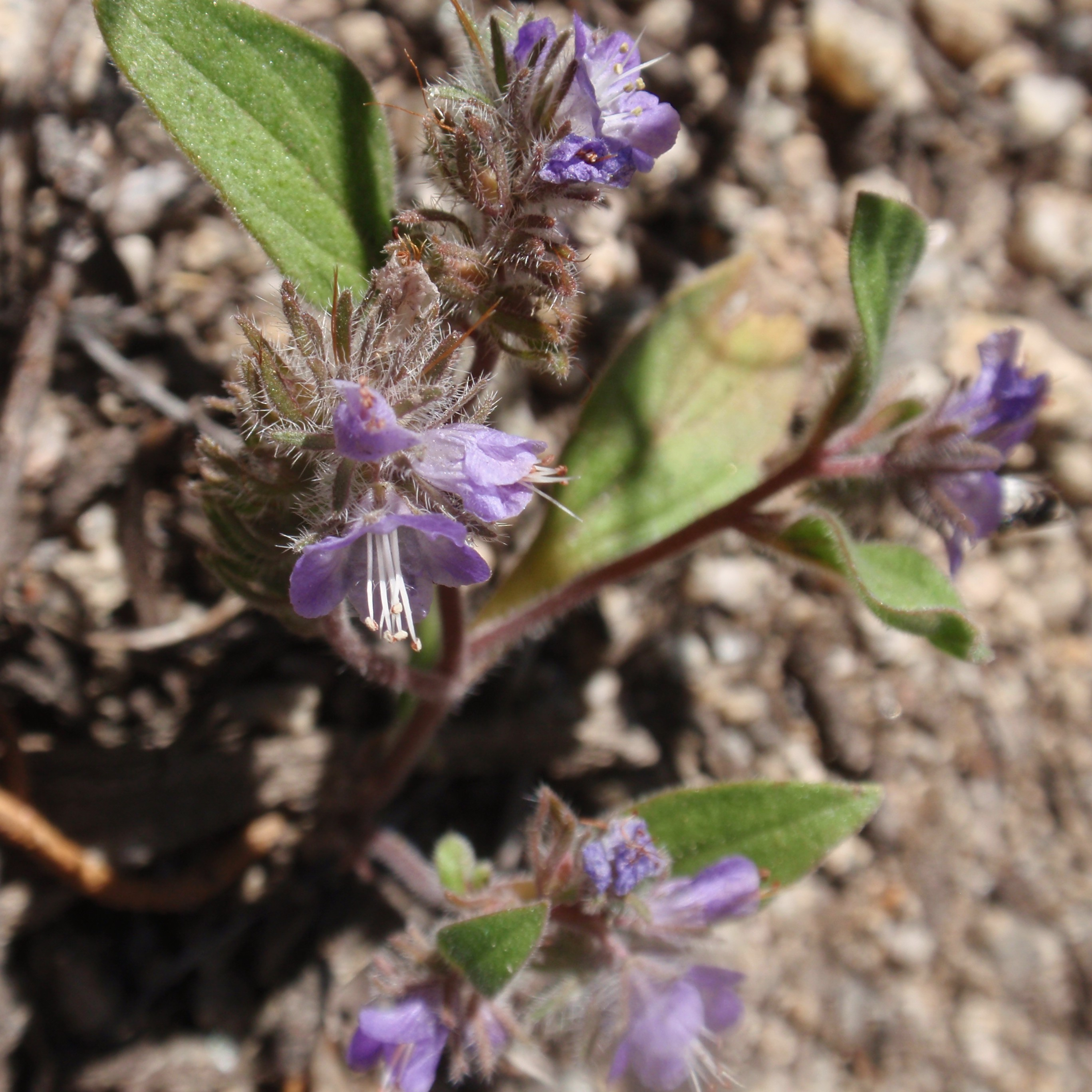

Scientific classification
- Kingdom: Plantae
- Clade: Tracheophytes
- Clade: Angiosperms
- Clade: Eudicots
- Clade: Asterids
- Order: Boraginales
- Family: Hydrophyllaceae
- Genus: Phacelia
- Species: P. humilis

Binomial name
- Phacelia humilis Torr. & A.Gray

= Phacelia humilis =

Species of plant

Phacelia humilis, with the common name low phacelia, is a species of phacelia. It is native to the Western United States, from central Washington to central California, where it grows in mountain and foothill habitat.

== Varieties ==
- Phacelia humilis var. humilis - most instances of this plant are this variety
- Phacelia humilis var. dudleyi - is known only from the southern Sierra Nevada and adjacent Tehachapi Mountains of California.

== Description ==
It is an annual herb with an erect stem growing up to 20 centimeters tall. It is glandular and coated in stiff hairs. The oval leaves are 1 to 4 centimeters long. The inflorescence is a one-sided curving or coiling cyme of bell-shaped purple flowers. Each flower is roughly half a centimeter long and surrounded by a calyx of sepals which are coated densely in long, straight, white hairs.
