= Alexis Bachelot =

19th-century French missionary Roman Catholic priest

The Reverend Alexis Bachelot SS.CC.
- Prefect Apostolic of the Sandwich Islands
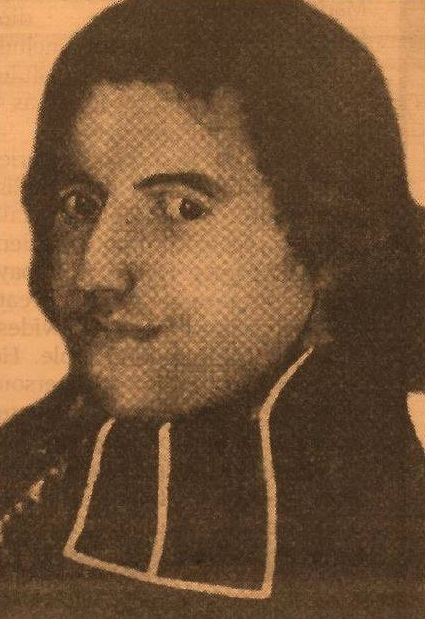
- Church: Roman Catholic
- Diocese: Prefecture Apostolic of the Sandwich Islands
- In office: 1825–1837
- Predecessor: none
- Successor: Etienne Jerome Rouchouze

Personal details
- Born: 22 February 1796 Saint-Cyr-la-Rosière, Orne, France
- Died: 5 December 1837 (aged 41) Pacific Ocean

Alexis Bachelot, SS.CC., (English: /bæʃˈloʊ/ bash-LOH, French: [alɛksi baʃlo]; born Jean-Augustin Bachelot; 22 February 1796 – 5 December 1837) was a Catholic priest best known for his tenure as the first Prefect Apostolic of the Sandwich Islands. In that role, he led the first permanent Catholic mission to the Kingdom of Hawaii. Bachelot was raised in France, where he attended the Irish College in Paris, and was ordained a priest in 1820. He led the first Catholic mission to Hawaii, arriving in 1827. Although he had expected the approval of then Hawaiian King Kamehameha II, he learned upon arrival that Kamehameha II had died and a new government that was hostile towards Catholic missionaries had been installed. Bachelot, however, was able to convert a small group of Hawaiians and quietly minister to them for four years before being deported in 1831 on the orders of Kaʻahumanu, the Kuhina Nui (a position similar to queen regent) of Hawaii.

Bachelot then traveled to California, where he served as an assistant minister while pastoring and teaching. In 1837, having learned of Queen Kaʻahumanu's death and King Kamehameha III's willingness to allow Catholic priests on the island, Bachelot returned to Hawaii, intending to continue his missionary work. However, by Bachelot's arrival, Kamehameha III had again changed his mind and Bachelot was removed from the island and confined to a ship for several months. He was freed only after the French and British navies imposed a naval blockade on the Honolulu harbor. Although he was later able to secure passage on a ship to Micronesia, he died en route and was buried on an islet near Pohnpei. His treatment in Hawaii prompted the government of France to dispatch a frigate to the island; the resulting intervention is known as the French Incident and led to the emancipation of Catholics in Hawaii.

== Early life ==
Bachelot was born in Saint-Cyr-la-Rosière, Orne, France on 22 February 1796. In 1806, he left home for Paris, where he enrolled in the Preparatory Seminary of Picpus to pursue priesthood. In 1813, he professed at the Congregation of the Sacred Hearts of Jesus and Mary, taking the name Alexis. He studied at the Irish College in Paris before being ordained as a priest in 1820. As a priest, he initially served as the College's rector and later led the preparatory seminary at Tours.

== Hawaiian mission ==
In the early 1820s, Jean Baptiste Rives, a French adviser to the Hawaiian king Kamehameha II, traveled to Europe to attempt to convince European Catholics to organize a mission to Hawaii. Members of the Congregation of the Sacred Hearts of Jesus and Mary were receptive to his idea, and in 1825, Pope Leo XII assigned them the task of evangelizing Hawaii. Bachelot was appointed the Prefect Apostolic of the Sandwich Islands, and in this role led the first permanent mission to Hawaii.

The expedition was organized by the influential Monneron family and funded by the government of France. Bachelot was assisted in his new position by fellow priests Patrick Short and Abraham Armand, as well as several lay brothers. The mission sailed from Bordeaux on La Comète in November 1826. The missionaries were initially accompanied by a group that planned to explore commercial trading opportunities but returned to France after reaching Mexico.

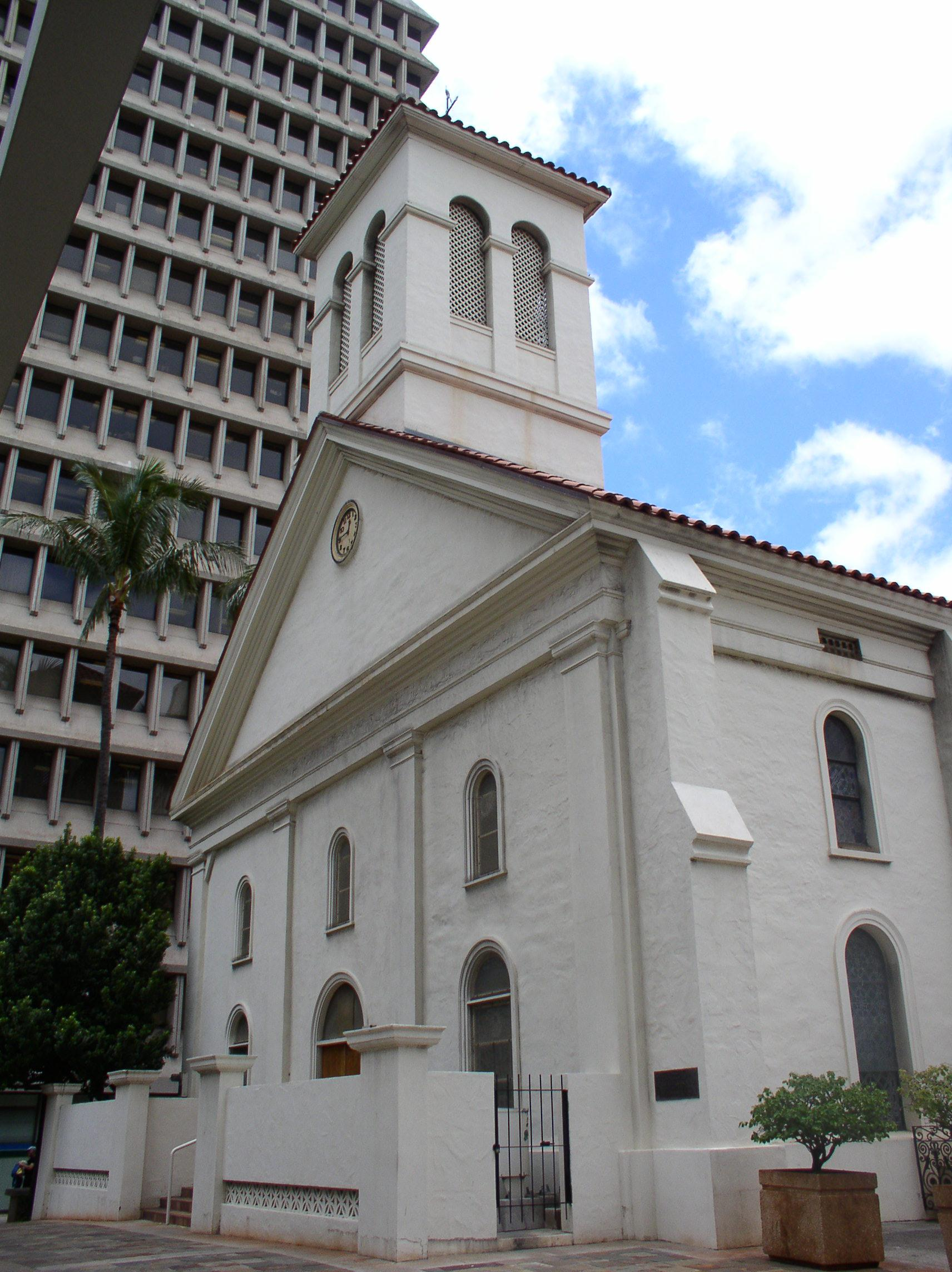
Cathedral of Our Lady of Peace in 2006

Unbeknownst to Bachelot, political changes occurred in Hawaii prior to the mission's arrival. King Kamehameha II died in 1824 and his younger brother Kamehameha III became king. Because Kamehameha III was young at the time of his ascension, Queen Kaʻahumanu (their stepmother) ruled as Kuhina Nui. On the advice of Hiram Bingham I—a Protestant missionary who had converted the Hawaiian royalty four years previously—Queen Kaʻahumanu took a hard stance against Catholicism. Rives' influence on the Hawaiian government had faded, and he never returned to Hawaii.

La Comète arrived in Honolulu on 7 July 1827. The priests were faced with a situation of dire poverty owing to the absence of Rives' patronage. Furthermore, they had promised La Comète's captain that Rives would pay for their passage after they arrived in Hawaii, but by the time of their arrival, Rives had already left. Queen Kaʻahumanu refused to allow the missionaries to stay, suspecting them to be covert agents of the government of France. She instructed La Comète's captain to take the mission with him when he departed. The captain, however, refused to do so because he did not receive payment for their passage, so the party was able to remain.

The priests began their missionary work, but encountered suspicion from most chiefs. The members of the party had great difficulty defending themselves, as none of them was fluent in English or Hawaiian. But, the group were favorably received by the high chief Boki, the royal governor of Oahu, and his wife Kuini Liliha. (The couple were Catholic converts and rivals of Queen Kaʻahumanu.) Boki welcomed the party and gave its members permission to stay.

For several months, Bachelot and his fellow missionaries lived in three small rented structures, saying their first mass on the island in a grass hut. They later built a chapel on a small plot of land they purchased, where the Cathedral of Our Lady of Peace was dedicated in 1843. After settling on the island, the group avoided drawing attention to themselves and studied the Hawaiian language. During their mission's first two years, the group converted 65 Hawaiians and ministered to Hawaiians who had already been converted. They often held surreptitious night-time meetings with converts who feared persecution. The priests' vestments and rituals made their evangelism efforts more effective because they reminded Hawaiians of native religious customs.

Bachelot introduced two plant species to Hawaii: Prosopis humilis and Bougainvillea. Prosopis humilis trees later covered thousands of acres there. He had obtained the seeds, which were originally gathered by Catholic missionaries in California, from the Royal Conservatory in Paris. Bachelot translated a prayer book into Hawaiian (O Ke A'o Ana Kristiano, "Christian Doctrine", c. 1831), authored a catechism in Hawaiian (He Ōlelo Ho'ona'auao, "A Word of Instruction", 1831), and wrote an introduction to Hawaiian grammar in French (Notes Grammaticales, "Grammatical Notes", 1834).

== Persecution ==
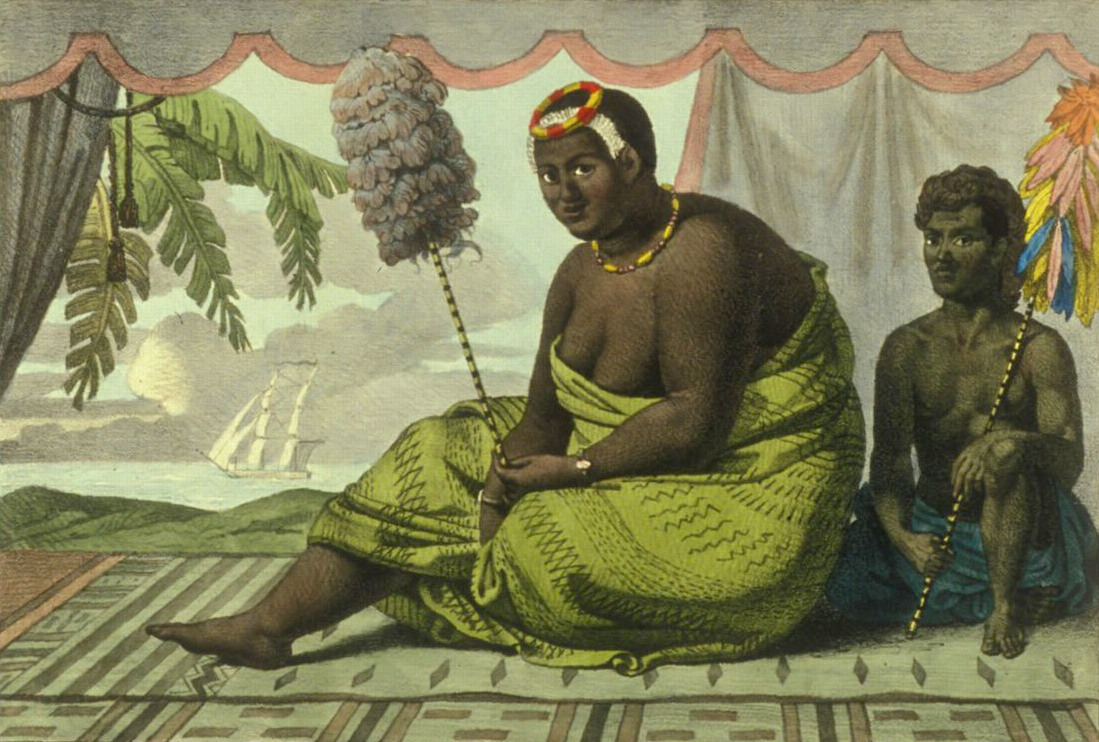
1816 painting of Queen Kaʻahumanu, who deported Bachelot from Hawaii in 1831

By 1827, Protestant Christianity, and in particular Bingham's teachings, had become the de facto state religion of the Kingdom of Hawaii. Queen Kaʻahumanu persecuted Catholics from 1829 until her death in 1832, by, for example, forbidding Hawaiians from attending masses and instructing Bachelot not to proselytize. In December 1831, Bachelot and Short were deported and forced to leave on a ship, the Waverly, bound for North America. Though Queen Kaʻahumanu steadfastly opposed his work, Bachelot viewed her as a good person who had been deceived by Protestant missionaries.

The news of Bachelot and Short's expulsion caused controversy in the United States, where it was viewed as a violation of the rights appertaining to foreigners in the 1826 treaty signed by Commodore Thomas ap Catesby Jones of the United States Navy and King Kamehameha III. U.S. Navy Commodore John Downes protested the expulsions while in discussion with chiefs during his 1832 visit to the kingdom.

== California ==
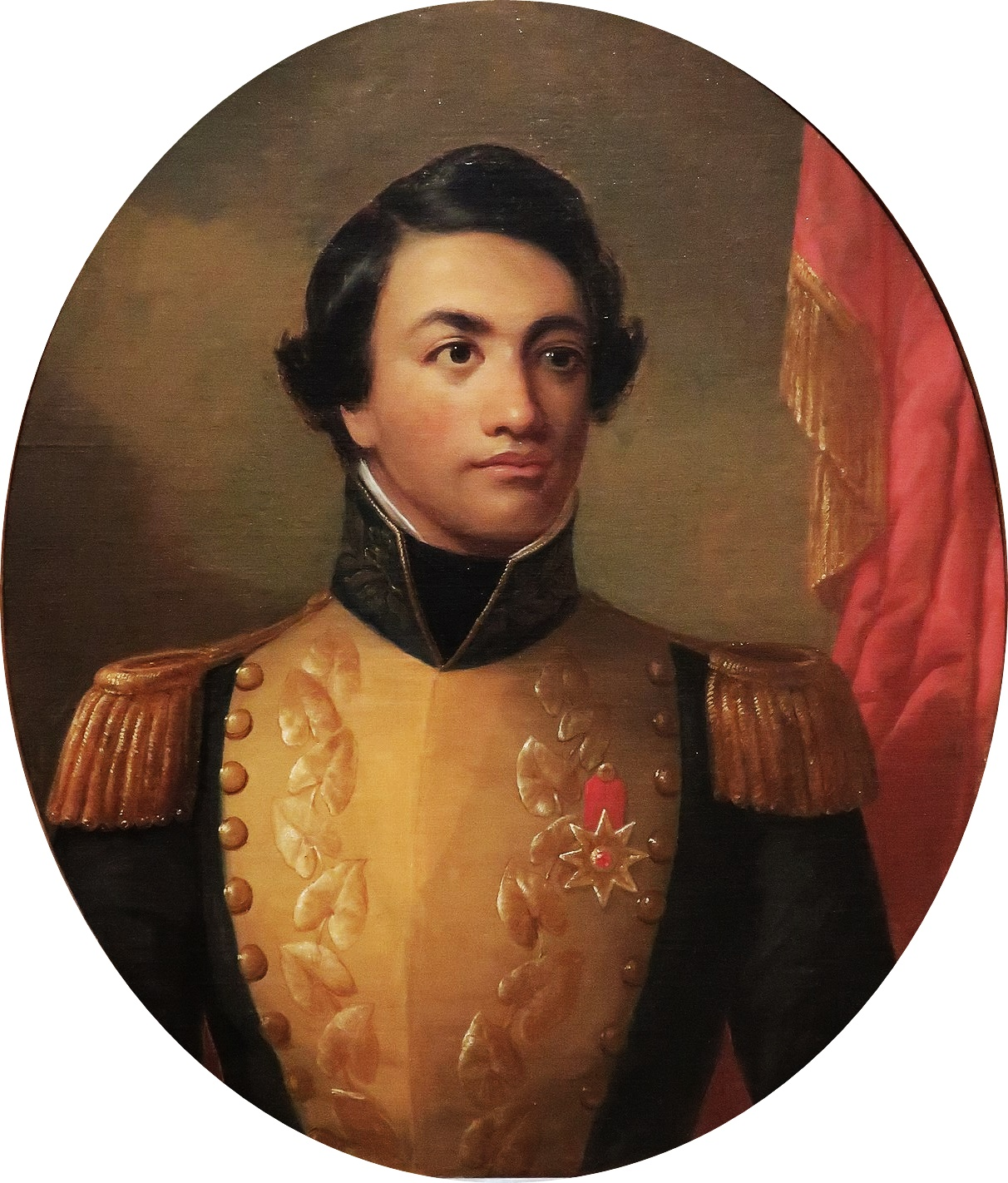
Portrait of the young King Kamehameha III

The Waverly landed at a vacant area near San Pedro, Los Angeles, in January 1832. Bachelot and Short traveled to the Mission San Gabriel Arcángel, where they were welcomed by the Franciscans who staffed the mission. Bachelot later became the pastor of a church in Los Angeles, served as an assistant minister for the mission, and led the mission on an interim basis after its priest was reassigned in 1834. He also taught in Los Angeles schools during a teacher shortage. He ministered in California until 1837 and became popular with Angelenos.

In 1833, the Congregation for the Propagation of the Faith reorganized the jurisdiction of Oceania. Hawaii became part of the newly created Apostolic Vicariate of Eastern Oceania, which was split into northern and southern divisions. Bachelot remained as the Prefect Apostolic for the northern division. Etienne Jerome Rouchouze served as the Vicar Apostolic of Eastern Oceania and oversaw Bachelot's assignment in Hawaii.

In 1835 and 1836, two representatives of the Catholic Church traveled to Hawaii in an attempt to ascertain whether Bachelot could return. Queen Kaʻahumanu had died in 1832, and the following year King Kamehameha III began making radical changes to Hawaiian law. Columban Murphy, a Catholic lay brother from the United Kingdom, visited King Kamehameha III in 1835 and discussed the possibility of Bachelot's return. Finding King Kamehameha III amenable to the idea, Murphy traveled to California to relay the news. He was unable, however, to locate Bachelot, who was absent from the area at the time. After Bachelot received Murphy's message, Bachelot and Short decided to return to Hawaii. The Ayuntamiento in Los Angeles, a municipal council, attempted to dissuade Bachelot and asked the Catholic leadership in Santa Barbara to prevent him from leaving, but he insisted on departing and the Catholic leadership did not prevent him.

== Final years ==
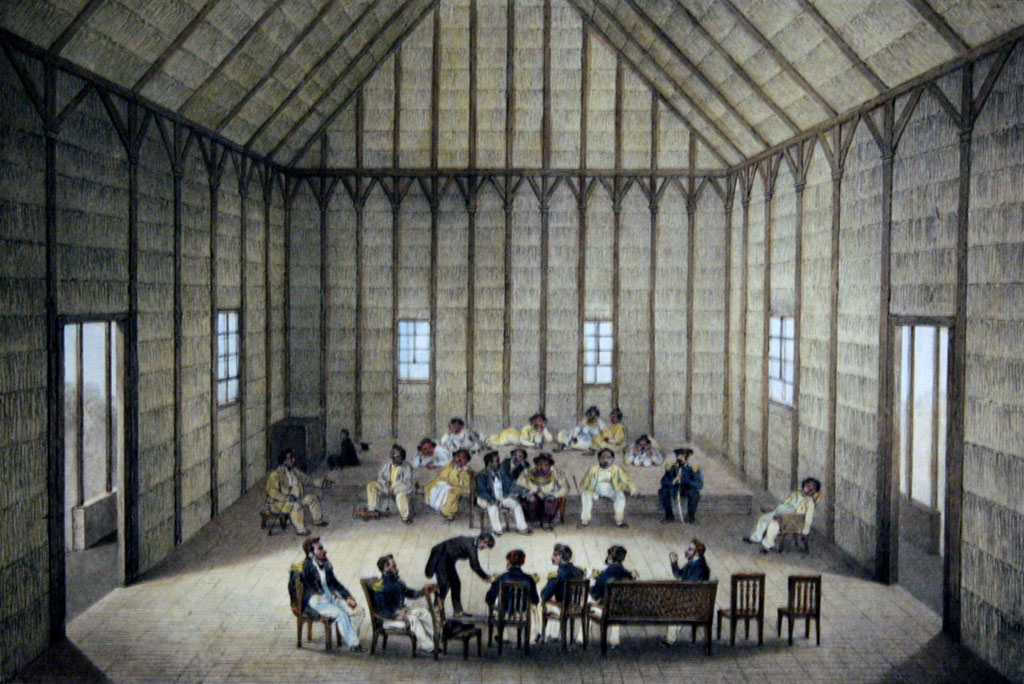
1837 painting of King Kamehameha III meeting with Captain Abel Aubert du Petit-Thouars and Captain Edward Belcher

When Bachelot and Short arrived in Honolulu in May 1837, they spent only 13 days on the island. Notwithstanding the agreement he had signed with French Naval Captain Abel Aubert du Petit-Thouars that allowed French citizens to live on the island, King Kamehameha III sought to deport the priests. Bachelot and Short were confined to the ship on which they had arrived, the Clémentine, on 22 May. However, the Clémentine's captain, Jules Dudoit, refused to transport them from Hawaii. Dudoit, a British citizen of French descent, met with Charlton, the British consul, and they publicly protested the priests' confinement. Their efforts to secure freedom for the priests to live on the island were unsuccessful until the British naval vessel HMS Sulphur and the French frigate the La Vénus arrived in Honolulu on 8 July. The ships were commanded respectively by Edward Belcher and Dupetit Thouars, who each tried to convince the authorities to allow the priests to return to the island. After negotiations proved futile, they blockaded the harbor, boarded the Clémentine, and brought Bachelot and Short ashore. The La Vénus sent 300 sailors to escort them from the harbor to the French mission. King Kamehameha III agreed to allow the priests to stay in Honolulu until they could find a ship to transport them elsewhere, under the condition that they refrain from proselytizing.

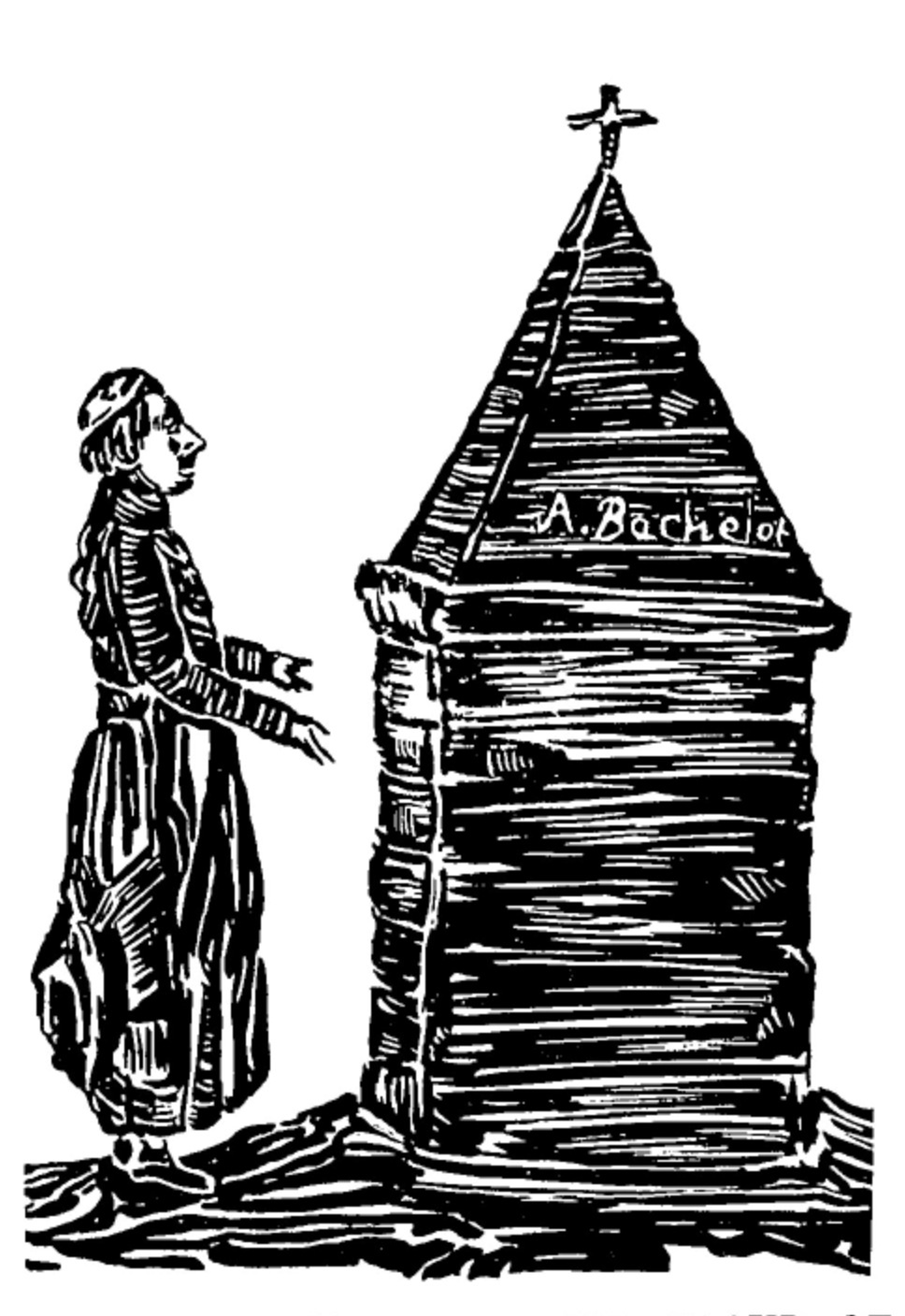
Visit of L'Abbe Maigret to the Tomb of the persecuted Bachelot, Island of Ascension, woodcuts by Jules Dudoit, c. 1839.

That year, Bachelot, who suffered from a form of rheumatism, became very sick. By November 1837, he had recovered sufficiently to leave Hawaii. He purchased a ship and sailed toward Micronesia, intending to work on a mission. Bachelot's health significantly worsened after leaving Hawaii and he died at sea on 5 December 1837. He was buried on an islet off the coast of Pohnpei. In 1838, a small chapel was built near his grave.

Owing to the persecution of Bachelot and his fellow priests, the government of France sent the frigate L'Artémise to Hawaii in 1839. Its captain, Cyrille Pierre Théodore Laplace, had been instructed to force the government to stop persecuting Catholics. In response to this show of force, King Kamehameha III granted Catholics freedom of religion.

== Bibliography ==
- Bancroft, Hubert Howe (1902), West American history, The Bancroft Company, OCLC 35811256
- Daws, Gavan (1968), Shoal of time: a history of the Hawaiian Islands, University of Hawaii Press, ISBN 978-0-8248-0324-7
- Forbes, David W. (2000), Hawaiian National Bibliography, 1780–1900: 1831–1850, University of Hawaii Press, ISBN 978-0-8248-2379-5
- Garrett, John (1982), To live among the stars: Christian origins in Oceania, Institute of Pacific Studies, ISBN 978-2-8254-0692-2
- González, Michael J. (2005), This small city will be a Mexican paradise: exploring the origins of Mexican culture in Los Angeles, 1821–1846, University of New Mexico Press, ISBN 978-0-8263-3607-1
- Hall, William Logan (1904), The forests of the Hawaiian Islands, U.S. Department of Agriculture, OCLC 9066931
- Kelley, Charlotte (September 1948), "The Church in Hawaii", Studies: An Irish Quarterly Review, 37 (147)
- Kuykendall, Ralph Simpson (1978) [1938], The Hawaiian Kingdom, 1778 – 1854, University of Hawaii Press, ISBN 978-0-87022-431-7
- McDougall, Walter A. (2004), Let the Sea Make a Noise...: A History of the North Pacific from Magellan to MacArthur, HarperCollins, ISBN 978-0-06-057820-6
- Mulholland, John Field (1970), Hawaii's religions, C. E. Tuttle, ISBN 0-8048-0710-8
- Older, Fremont (Mrs.) (1938), California Missions and Their Romances, Coward-McCann, ISBN 978-1-4179-8642-2
- Pietrusewsky, Michael; Willacker, Lisa (March 1997), "The search for Father Bachelot: first Catholic missionary to the Hawaiian Islands (1827–1837)", Journal of Forensic Sciences, 42 (2), John Wiley & Sons: 208–212, doi:10.1520/JFS14099J, PMID 9068178
- Wong, Helen; Rayson, Ann (1987), Hawaii's Royal History, Bess Press, ISBN 978-0-935848-48-9
- Scott, Susan (1991), Plants and Animals of Hawaii, Bess Press, ISBN 978-0-935848-93-9
- Tabrah, Ruth M. (1984), Hawaii: a history, W. W. Norton & Company, ISBN 978-0-393-30220-2
- Yzendoor, Reginald (1914), Charles George Herbermann (ed.), The Catholic Encyclopedia, vol. XVI, The Encyclopedia Press, OCLC 174525385

Catholic Church titles
Preceded by none	Apostolic Prefecture of the Sandwich Islands; 1825–1837	Succeeded by Vicar Apostolic of Oriental Oceania
