= Ruth Tabrah =

American novelist

Ruth M. Tabrah
- Born: February 28, 1921; Buffalo, New York, U.S.
- Died: April 8, 2004 (aged 83); Honolulu, Hawaii, U.S.
- Education: University at Buffalo
- Occupations: Writer, Buddhist minister
- Known for: Authoring novels, historical works, and Buddhist scholarship
- Notable work: Hawaii: A History, The Monk Who Dared, The Monk’s Wife, Ni’ihau: The Last Hawaiian Island

Ruth M. Tabrah (February 28, 1921 – April 8, 2004), was an American writer and ordained Buddhist minister.

== Life and career ==
Ruth Tabrah was born in Buffalo and studied at the University at Buffalo. Most of her life was spent in Hawai'i, living first on the Big Island and later in Honolulu. She was an ordained minister at Honpa Hongwanji Hawaii Betsuin and became an authority on the history of Buddhism in Hawai'i. She served as the president of the Hawai'i Association of International Buddhists and was active in Buddhist community events, such as obon, hanamatsuri and other festivals.

Tabrah was a prolific author, writing on a wide range of topics. Her work included children's books, novels about immigration to the United States, and non-fiction about the history of Japan and the Hawaiian Islands. Hawaii: A History was published in 1984. Her 1995 novel, The Monk Who Dared, is based on the life of Japanese Buddhist sage Shinran Shonin, founder of the Jodo Shinshu school of Buddhism.

== Selected bibliography ==
- Hawaii: A History. New York: Norton, 1980.
- Living Shin Buddhism: An Account of a Visit with Hanada-Sensei, Honolulu: Honpa Hongwanji Mission of Hawai'i, 1978.
- The Monk who Dared: A Novel about Shinran. Kailua, HI: Press Pacifica, 1995.
- The Monk’s Wife: A Novel about Esshini, Honolulu: Buddhist Studies Center, 2001.
- Ni’ihau: The Last Hawaiian Island. Kailua, HI: Press Pacifica, 1987.
- Pulaski Place. New York: Harper, 1950.
- "Religions of Japanese Immigrants and Japanese American Communities," Encyclopedia of Women and Religion in North America, ed. Rosemary Skinner Keller and Rosemary Radford Ruether. Bloomington: Indiana University Press, 2006, 680–687.
- The Voices of Others. New York: Putnam, 1959.
- "Hawaii Nei". Chicago & New York: Follett Publishing Company, 1967
