= Étienne Rouchouze =

French Catholic missionary

The Most Reverend Étienne Rouchouze SS.CC.
- Vicar Apostolic of Eastern Oceania
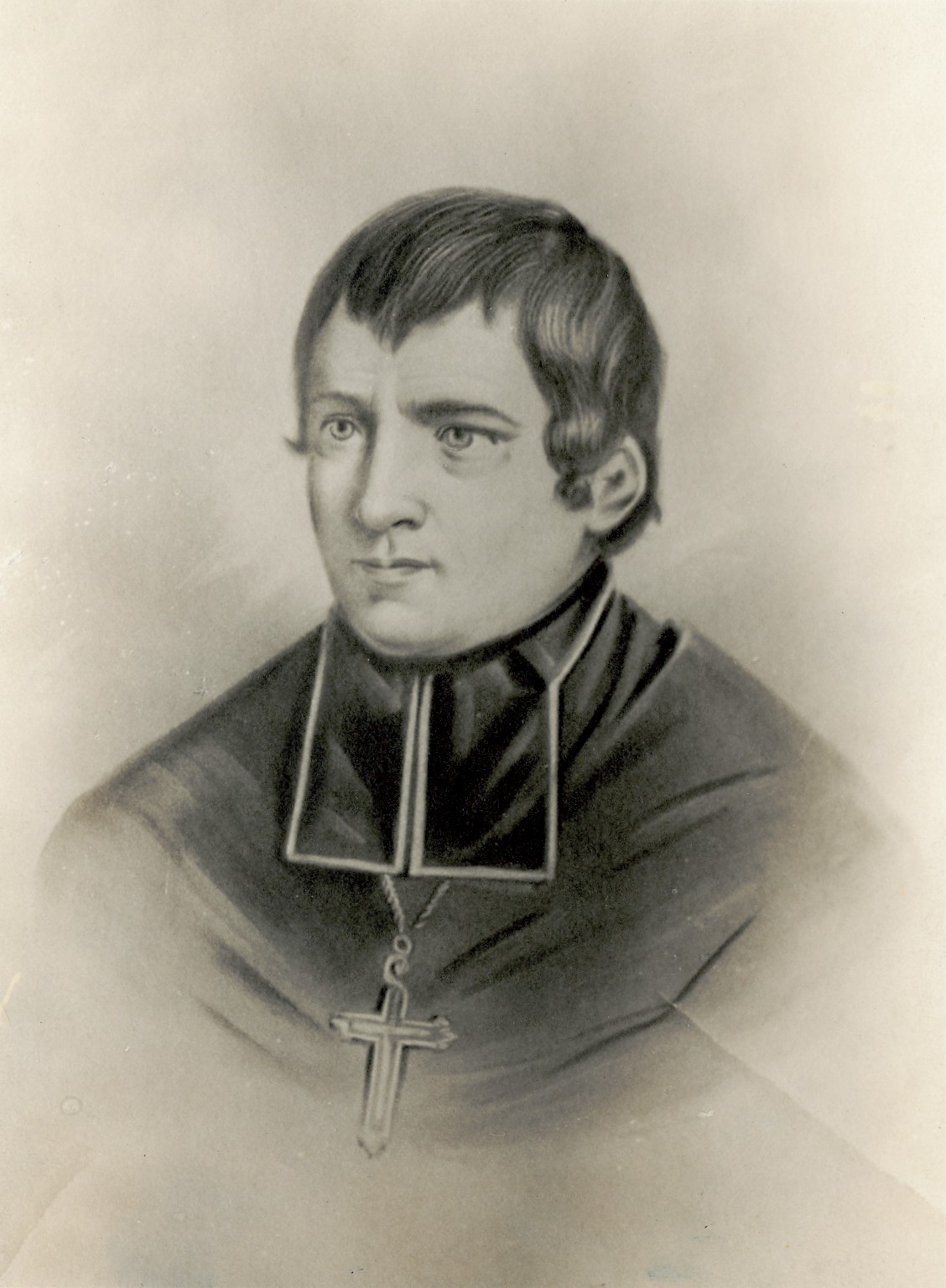
- Church: Catholic
- See: Titular Bishop of Nilopolis
- Appointed: 14 June 1833
- In office: 1833–1843
- Predecessor: Alexis Bachelot

Orders
- Consecration: 22 December 1833 by Carlo Maria Pedicini
- Rank: Bishop

Personal details
- Born: Étienne Jérôme Rouchouze; 28 February 1798 Chazeau, Guadeloupe, France
- Died: 1843 At sea

Styles of Étienne Rouchouze
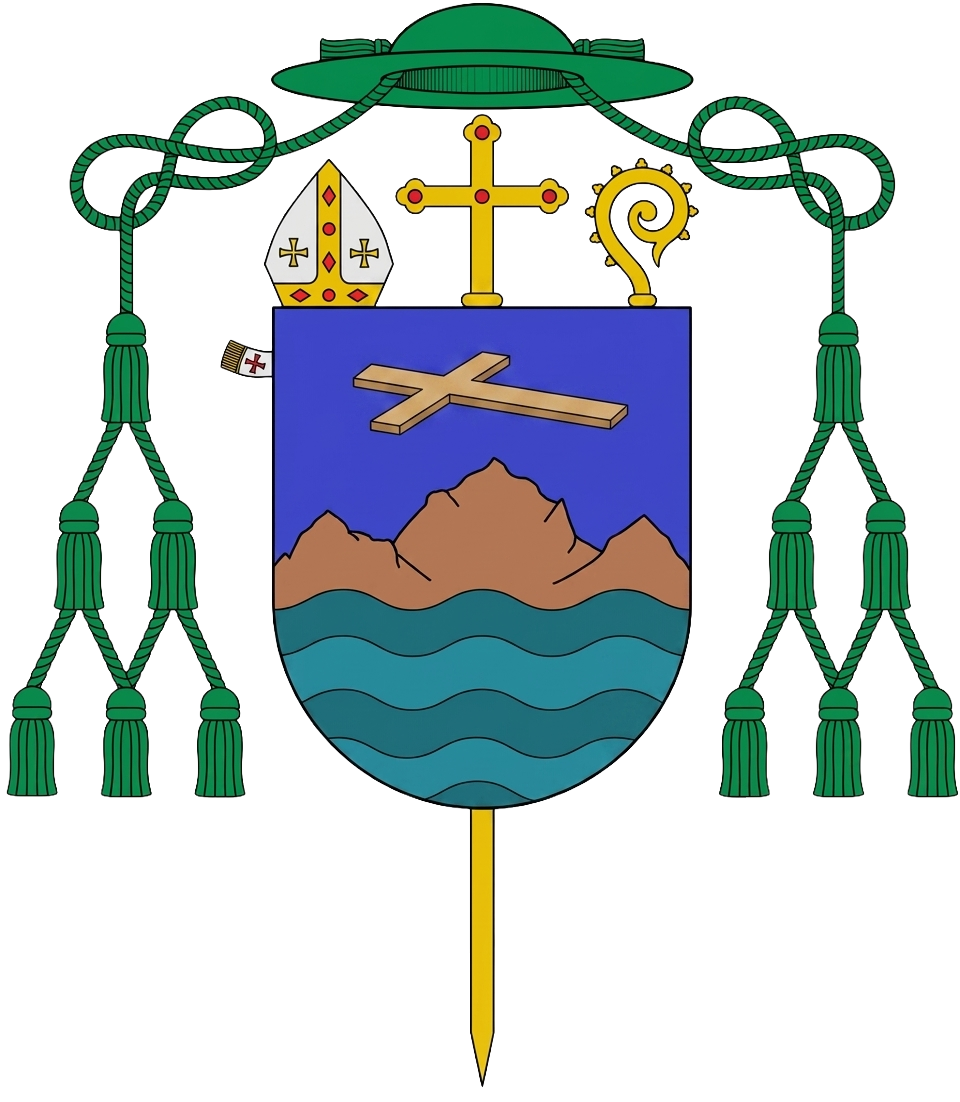
- Reference style: His Excellency; The Most Reverend
- Spoken style: Your Excellency
- Religious style: Bishop

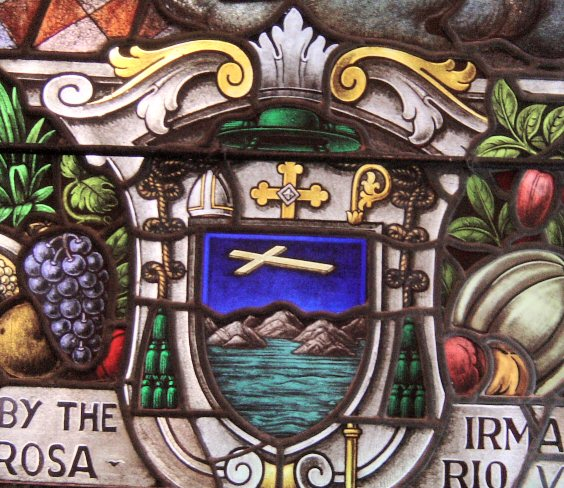
Episcopal arms of Msgr. Rouchouze in a window at the Cathedral of Our Lady of Peace, Honolulu.

Étienne Jérôme Rouchouze SS.CC. (English: Stephen Rouchouze; 1798–1843) was a French Catholic missionary in the Eastern Pacific Ocean (including the Kingdom of Hawaii in the Hawaiian Islands chain, also known as the former Sandwich Islands).

== Biography ==
A member of the Congregation of the Sacred Hearts of Jesus and Mary, he was appointed by the Holy See Vicar Apostolic and Titular Bishop of Nilopolis from 1833 to 1843 of the Vicariate Apostolic of Oriental Oceania, from which were derived the Archdiocese of Papeete, the Diocese of Honolulu and the Diocese of Taiohae or Tefenuaenata in the Marquesas Islands. As a missionary bishop, Msgr. Rouchouze resided in Valparaíso, Chile and in Honolulu; he was responsible for the evangelization efforts of the Picpus Fathers in the Hawaiian Islands and eastern Pacific. His motto was Per aspera in astera (from hardship to the stars).

Prior to his episcopal ministry, Pope Gregory XVI, on 27 November 1825, created the Prefecture Apostolic of the Sandwich Islands. Father Alexis Bachelot was subsequently appointed its first prefect on 3 December 1825.

Msgr. Rouchouze was appointed Vicar Apostolic of Eastern Oceania and Titular Bishop of Nilopolis on 14 June 1833 with ordinary jurisdiction over the Hawai‘i prefecture apostolic. He was subsequently consecrated to the episcopate in Rome, on 22 December 1833 by the Prefect of the Propaganda Fide, Cardinal Carlo Maria Pedicini. On 29 June 1834, in Golden Square in London, Msgr. Rouchouze served as principal co-consecrator in the episcopal ordination of Msgr. John Bede Polding, O.S.B., Titular Bishop of Hierocaesarea and Vicar Apostolic elect of New Holland.

Rouchouze left Le Havre on 29 October 1834 and arrived in Valparaíso, Chile on 19 February 1835. After staying a few months, he went on to Mangareva in the Gambier Islands on 9 May 1835. He baptized the island's king Maputeoa and his family on 25 August 1836. On 4 April 1839, Msgr. Rouchouze returned to blessed the first stone for the St. Michael's Cathedral, Rikitea in Mangareva. He said the first pontifical Mass in the Marquesas at Tahuata on 6 February 1839. He arrived in Honolulu on 14 May 1840.

On 8 December 1842 the ship Marie-Joseph was blessed in Saint Malo in Brittany. Shortly thereafter, Msgr. Rouchouze, accompanied by six priests, one sub-deacon, seven lays brothers and ten sisters, left Saint Malo for Oceania on the Marie-Joseph. Sister Caliste Le Gris died at sea. Unwilling to bury her at sea, they put into Island of Saint Catherine near Florianópolis in Brazil and buried her there. On 19 February 1843 Rouchouze and his remaining missionaries left the island. Evaristo, a Mangarevan youth, fell ill and also died while they were in Brazil. The ship was last sited off the Falkland Islands on 13 March 1843. Rouchouze and his companions were never seen again and were presumed to have perished at sea.

== See also ==
- Catholic Church hierarchy
- List of missionaries to Hawaii
- Lists of patriarchs, archbishops, and bishops
- Roman Catholic Bishop of Honolulu

== Sources and References ==
- GCatholic

== Bibliography ==
- Garrett, John (1982). To Live Among the Stars: Christian Origins in Oceania. Suva, Fiji: Institute of Pacific Studies, University of the South Pacific. ISBN 978-2-8254-0692-2.
- Laval, Honoré; Newbury, C. W.; O'Reilly, Patrick (1968). Mémoires pour servir à l'histoire de Mangareva: ère chrétienne, 1834–1871. Paris: Musée de l'Homme.
- Kirk, Robert W. (2012). Paradise Past: The Transformation of the South Pacific, 1520–1920. Jefferson, NC: McFarland. ISBN 978-0-7864-6978-9.
- Wiltgen, Ralph M. (2010). The Founding of the Roman Catholic Church in Oceania, 1825 to 1850. Eugene, OR: Wipf and Stock Publishers. ISBN 978-1-60899-536-3.
- Yzendoorn, Reginald (1927). History of the Catholic Mission in the Hawaiian Islands. Honolulu: Honolulu Star-Bulletin.

== Episcopal succession ==
Catholic Church titles
Preceded by Prefect Apostolic of the Sandwich Islands, Prefect Apostolic of Tahiti, Prefect Apostolic of the Marquesas Islands	Vicar Apostolic of Oriental Oceania; 1833–1843	Succeeded by Vicar Apostolic of the Sandwich Islands, Vicar Apostolic of Tahiti, Vicar Apostolic of the Marquesas Islands
