= Prosopis humilis =

Scientific classification
- Kingdom: Plantae
- Clade: Tracheophytes
- Clade: Angiosperms
- Clade: Eudicots
- Clade: Rosids
- Order: Fabales
- Family: Fabaceae
- Subfamily: Caesalpinioideae
- Clade: Mimosoid clade
- Genus: Prosopis
- Species: P. humilis

Binomial name
- Prosopis humilis Gillies ex Hook. & Arn.

Species of legume

Prosopis humilis, the algarrobilla or algaroba (carob in Spanish), is a mesquite, a flowering plant and a tree species in the genus Prosopis found in Argentina.

It is placed in subfamily Caesalpinioideae.

== See also ==
- Prosopis algarrobilla, a synonym for Prosopis nigra
