= Apostolic Prefecture of the Sandwich Islands =

The Apostolic Prefecture of the Sandwich Islands or the Sandwich Isles Mission (Latin: Praefectura Apostolica Sandwigiensis in Oceania), was an ecclesiastical territory of the Catholic Church created by Pope Leo XII on November 27, 1825, encompassing the Sandwich Islands, now the state of Hawai‘i, and entrusted to the care of the Congregation of the Sacred Hearts of Jesus and Mary.

Father Alexis Bachelot, SS.CC., was the only serving Prefect, as the Prefecture was made subject to the newly-created Vicariate Apostolic of Oriental Oceania on June 2, 1833. The present-day successor to the prefecture is the Diocese of Honolulu.
