= Saint Anthony Catholic Church (Honolulu) =

Coordinates: 21.3307021°N 157.8825874°W

Saint Anthony Catholic Church in Honolulu is a parish in the West Honolulu Vicariate Forane of the Roman Catholic Diocese of Honolulu.

== History ==
The Catholic faith was brought to Kalihi about 1840 when Brother Calixtus built an altar in a rented store for Sunday Mass. The parish was canonically erected in 1916, when Father Ulrich Taube, SS.CC., built the first wooden church that was consecrated that same year under the title of Saint Anthony of Padua by Msgr. Libert H. Boeynaems, SS.CC., Vicar Apostolic of the Hawaiian Islands. Father Ulrich commuted daily from the downtown Honolulu rectory at the Cathedral of Our Lady of Peace, serving the faithful of Kalihi Kai until his resignation due to illness in 1927.

Msgr. Stephen Alencastre, SS.CC., Vicar Apostolic, appointed Father Hubert Nijs, SS.CC., as the second pastor of the parish. Father Hubert moved into a rectory cottage next to the church and became the first resident priest in Kalihi Kai. Plantation workers and laborers moving into Kalihi Kai since the turn of the century resulted in a substantial increase in population. In an area where most of the faithful lacked basic education, Father Hubert announced the opening of a parish school and converted the medium-sized parish hall into two rooms. Two Maryknoll nuns volunteered to staff the school with an enrollment of 128 students in the first and second grades that opened on September 2, 1928. These two sisters made a daily commute from their convent located near Punahou School. Five more Maryknoll nuns joined the school in 1929 and Father Hubert purchased the adjacent property across Kaumualii Street and built a two-story convent for the sisters.

The school facilities were expanded as Father Hubert continued to purchase adjacent lots. Father Hubert also erected a three-room school building and made improvements to the convent. In 1947, during the episcopate of Msgr. James Sweeney, Father Hubert razed the old rectory cottage and built a new three story school next to a new rectory. In 1950, Msgr. Sweeney approved the assignment by the Provincial Superior of the Sacred Hearts Fathers of Father Maurice Coopman, SS.CC., as the pastor of Saint Anthony parish. Father Maurice labored patiently, and erased the parish debt accrued during the building of the school and rectory. Father Maurice was retired in 1962 due to illness and Father Anselm Ernest Gouveia, SS.CC., was appointed pastor after serving the faithful as pastor in Kaneohe.

The wooden church built in 1916 was razed in 1967 to make way for a new concrete church designed by Ray Akagi at a cost of $226,800. Designed with a semicircular floor plan, a domed roof, and replete with beautiful ecclesiastical appointments including a mosaic depicting the baptism of Jesus by John the Baptist, floral stained glass windows, and various other stained-glass windows depicting various events in the history of the parish and the diocese, and walnut pews manufactured by the Trappist monks of Lafayette, Indiana the new church was consecrated on August 25, 1968 by Msgr. John J. Scanlan, Bishop of Honolulu.

== Today ==
The parish campus included an elementary school which started in 1928 closed in 2018. The school was staffed by the Philippine province of the Congregation of the Sisters of St. Paul of Chartres who lived in an adjacent convent. The parish is staffed by the clergy of the Missionaries of La Salette.

== Resources ==
- Saint Anthony School, Kalihi Kai
- Hawaii Catholic Herald, May 27, 1966
- Hawaii Catholic Herald, August 23, 1968, and, August 30, 1968
