= Francis A. Marzen =

American priest (1925–2004)

Francis A. Marzen (March 14, 1925 – July 19, 2004) was a priest of the Roman Catholic Diocese of Honolulu, former editor of the Hawaii Catholic Herald and an information specialist for the City & County of Honolulu in the administration of Mayor Frank Fasi.

Born in East Mauch Chunk — present-day Jim Thorpe, Pennsylvania — Marzen studied at the Pontifical College Josephinum in Worthington, Ohio and was ordained in the fledgling diocese in the Hawaiian Islands in 1951 alongside his classmate, Bernard J. Eikmeier. Marzen was the founding pastor of Our Lady of Good Counsel Church and School in Pearl City as well as Saints Peter and Paul Church in the Kapi`olani Business District of Honolulu.

Marzen was appointed a Chaplain of His Holiness with the title of Monsignor by Pope John XXIII in 1963. His classmate Eikmeier joined him in the ranks of the monsignori many years later during the episcopate of Joseph Anthony Ferrario.

After thirty years with the Hawaii Catholic Herald, twenty of which were spent as editor, Marzen was dismissed from his position by the newly appointed Bishop Ferrario. In 1986, Marzen retired from his position as pastor of Saints Peter and Paul Church. He was subsequently hired in 1987 by Mayor Frank Fasi as an information specialist.
