= Catholic bishop of Honolulu =

Catholic bishop in Hawaii

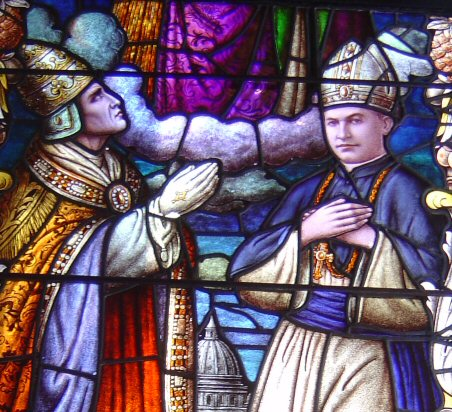
Depicted next to Pope Pius XI and below Saint Joseph, Patron of the Universal Church, is Bishop Stephen Alencastre who was the fifth and last Vicar Apostolic of the Hawaiian Islands.

The Bishop of Honolulu is the diocesan bishop of the Diocese of Honolulu in the United States, the Latin Catholic ecclesiastical territory over the entire state of Hawaii and the unincorporated Hawaiian Islands. The Honolulu diocese is a suffragan see in the ecclesiastical province administered by the metropolitan Archbishop of San Francisco. The Bishop of Honolulu is a member of the United States Conference of Catholic Bishops. He has two ecclesiastical seats: the Cathedral Basilica of Our Lady of Peace and the Co-Cathedral of Saint Theresa of the Child Jesus, both located in the City of Honolulu.

Previous to the canonical elevation of the Diocese of Honolulu, a single priest led what was the Prefecture Apostolic of the Sandwich Islands. The prefecture apostolic was later incorporated into another ecclesiastical territory, led by a bishop serving as Vicariate Apostolic of Oriental Oceania. The prefecture was later elevated to a vicariate apostolic. The phrase "Sandwich Islands" was later deleted and replaced by "Hawaiian Islands". Five bishops have led the Vicariate Apostolic of the Hawaiian Islands. All bishops were members of the Congregation of the Sacred Hearts of Jesus and Mary.

Five diocesan bishops have served the Diocese of Honolulu. On May 17, 2005 Pope Benedict XVI appointed as the fifth bishop of Honolulu Clarence Silva, who was consecrated and installed on July 21, 2005.

== Church organization ==
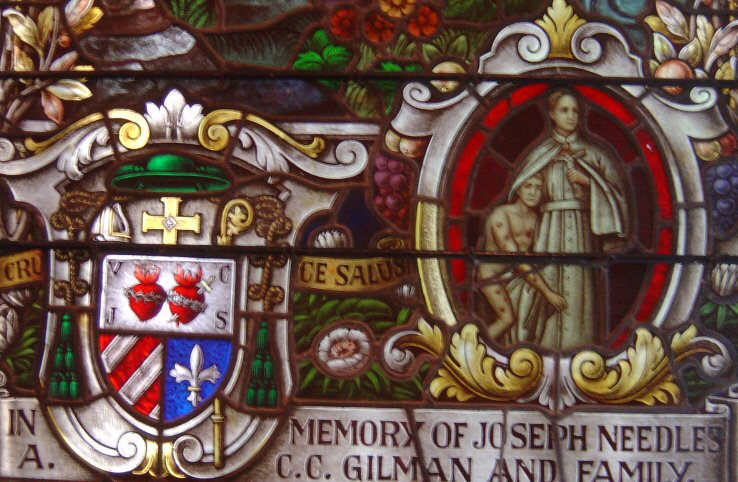
Bishop Herman Koeckemann was the second Vicar Apostolic of the Hawaiian Islands. His coat-of-arms and an image of Blessed Damien of Moloka‘i adorn the Cathedral of Our Lady of Peace.

Under civil laws, the Bishop of Honolulu acts as president of the Catholic Church in Hawaii as corporation sole. He oversees several agencies and departments that include but are not limited to: Augustine Educational Foundation, Catholic Campus Ministry, Catholic Charities, Department of Religious Education, Ethnic Ministry, Office of Worship, Eastern Catholic Vicariate, Saint Stephen Diocesan Center, Social Ministry, Diocesan Tribunal. He is also the publisher of the Hawai‘i Catholic Herald newspaper.

Efficient administration necessitated the creation of several vicariates served by vicars forane directly subordinate to the Bishop of Honolulu. The vicariates forane are: West Honolulu Vicariate, East Honolulu Vicariate, Windward O‘ahu Vicariate, Leeward O‘ahu Vicariate, Maui Vicariate, West Hawai‘i Vicariate, East Hawai‘i Vicariate and Kaua‘i Vicariate. A separate vicariate was created for ethnic communities and persons belonging to any of the Eastern Catholic Churches. Within each vicariate are the individual parish churches, each led by pastors.

== Interment ==
All those who served as Vicar Apostolic of the Hawaiian Islands or Bishop of Honolulu are buried in the Honolulu Catholic Cemetery, with the exception of Bishop Louis Maigret, Bishop James Sweeney, Bishop John Joseph Scanlan and Bishop Joseph Anthony Ferrario. Bishops Maigret and Scanlan were buried in the crypt of the Cathedral of Our Lady of Peace. Bishop Sweeney was buried in his family crypt in Holy Cross Cemetery in Colma, California. The location of the remains of the Vicar Apostolic of Oriental Oceania, Bishop Etienne Jerome Rouchouze are unknown. He is believed to have died at sea in a shipwreck. The remains of the only Prefect Apostolic of the Sandwich Islands, Msgr. Alexis Bachelot, SS.CC. are believed to be buried on Naha in the Marshall Islands.

== Prelates ==
Prelates are listed below with their terms of service and titles held while in Hawaii. Msgr. Alexis Bachelot lead the Prefecture Apostolic of the Sandwich Islands.

Portrait	Name	Term	Title
	Alexis Bachelot	1825–1837	Prefect Apostolic of the Sandwich Islands
	Étienne Jérôme Rouchouze	1833–1843	Vicar Apostolic of Oriental Oceania; Titular Bishop of Nilopolis
	Louis Désiré Maigret	1847–1881	First Vicar Apostolic of the Hawaiian Islands; Titular Bishop of Arathia
	Bernard Hermann Koeckemann	1881–1892	Second Vicar Apostolic of the Hawaiian Islands; Titular Bishop of Olba
	Gulstan Francis Ropert	1892–1903	Third Vicar Apostolic of the Hawaiian Islands; Titular Bishop of Panopolis
	Libert Hubert Boeynaems	1903–1926	Fourth Vicar Apostolic of the Hawaiian Islands; Titular Bishop of Zeugma
	Stephen Peter Alencastre	1926–1940	Fifth Vicar Apostolic of the Hawaiian Islands; Titular Bishop of Arabissus
	James Joseph Sweeney	1941–1967	First Bishop of Honolulu
	John Joseph Scanlan	1968–1981	Auxiliary Bishop of Honolulu; Titular Bishop of Cenae; Second Bishop of Honolulu; Apostolic Administrator of Honolulu
	Joseph Anthony Ferrario	1982–1993	Auxiliary Bishop of Honolulu; Titular Bishop of Cusae; Third Bishop of Honolulu
	Francis Xavier DiLorenzo	1994–2004	Apostolic Administrator of Honolulu; Titular Bishop of Tigia; Fourth Bishop of Honolulu
	Clarence Richard Silva	2005-2026	Fifth Bishop of Honolulu
	Michael T. Castori	2026-	Sixth Bishop of Honolulu

== See also ==
- Catholic Church by country
- Catholic Church hierarchy
- Catholic Church in the United States
- Ecclesiastical Province of San Francisco
- Global organisation of the Catholic Church
- Historical list of the Catholic bishops of the United States
- List of Catholic bishops of the United States
- List of missionaries to Hawaii
- List of Catholic archdioceses (by country and continent)
- List of Catholic dioceses (alphabetical) (including archdioceses)
- List of Catholic dioceses (structured view) (including archdioceses)
- List of the Catholic dioceses of the United States
- Lists of patriarchs, archbishops, and bishops

== Resources ==
- Roman Catholic Diocese of Honolulu
- Cathedral of Our Lady of Peace
- Co-Cathedral of Saint Theresa of the Child Jesus
- New Advent Article of the Vicariate Apostolic of the Sandwich Islands
