= St. Stephen Seminary, Honolulu =

Former school in Hawaii, United States

Coordinates: 21.3662°N 157.7786°W

- Active: 1946–1970
- Religious affiliation: Society of the Priests of Saint Sulpice

Saint Stephen Seminary was a diocesan minor seminary staffed by the Sulpician Fathers in the diocese of Honolulu that closed in 1970.

The seminary land was founded in 1946 when the Diocese of Honolulu obtained the 22-acre (8.9 ha) estate of Harold K.L. Castle, which was built in 1927. It is located above Maunawili valley in the Koolaupoko district of the island of Oahu. It currently serves as the residence of the bishop of Honolulu. At its peak the seminary accommodated some 70 high school and college students from Guam, other Pacific Islands and the State of Hawaii.

The seminary flourished in the 1950s and 1960s, but dwindled and closed in the early 1980s. After the seminary's closure, the Cullinan Building was transformed into a diocesan center housing various officers of the diocesan curia. Since the episcopate of Msgr. John Scanlan, the seminary grounds have also housed a Carmelite monastery of discalced nuns from Hong Kong.

Currently, candidates for priestly formation in the Diocese of Honolulu attend the metropolitan seminaries of Saint Joseph in Mountain View, California, and Saint Patrick in Menlo Park, California.

== Notable faculty and alumni ==
Prior to his elevation to the episcopate as auxiliary bishop of Honolulu, Msgr. Joseph Ferrario, was a professor of Greek and Latin at Saint Stephen's. Among his many students was Roman Catholic deacon and Hawaiian comedian, Frank Delima, known for his sardonic portrayal of a fictitious Roman prelate, Monsignor Vermicelli.
