= Malia O Ka Malu =

Hawaiian Marian epithet

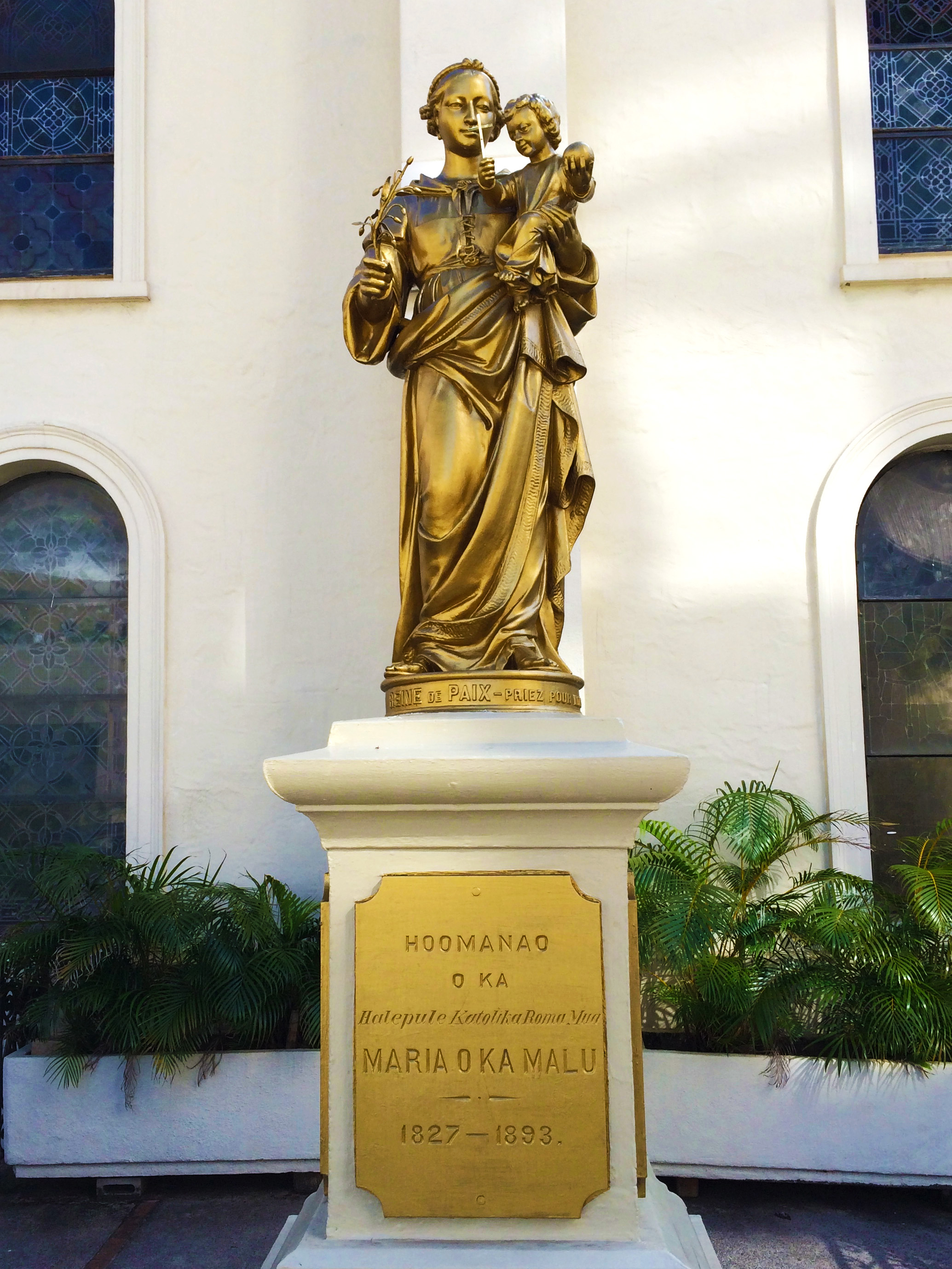
A statue of and dedicated to Malia O Ka Malu stands in the courtyard of the Cathedral of Our Lady of Peace in Honolulu.

Malia O Ka Malu is a title of the Blessed Virgin Mary in the Hawaiian language. It is shortened from "Malia o ka Malu Hale Pule Nui", a title of the mother church of the Roman Catholic Diocese of Honolulu, the Cathedral of Our Lady of Peace. The title is a translation of "Our Lady of Peace", a Marian title originating in the 16th century. Our Lady of Peace is celebrated on January 24 in the United States to coincide with the dedication of the Cathedral in Honolulu.
