= Cathedral Basilica of Our Lady of Peace =

Historic Roman Catholic church in Hawaii, United States

- French: Cathédrale de Notre Dame de la Paix Portuguese: Catedral de Nossa Senhora da Paz Hawaiian: Malia o ka Malu Hale Pule Nui; Latin: Basilicæ cathedralis Sanctæ Mariæ de Pace
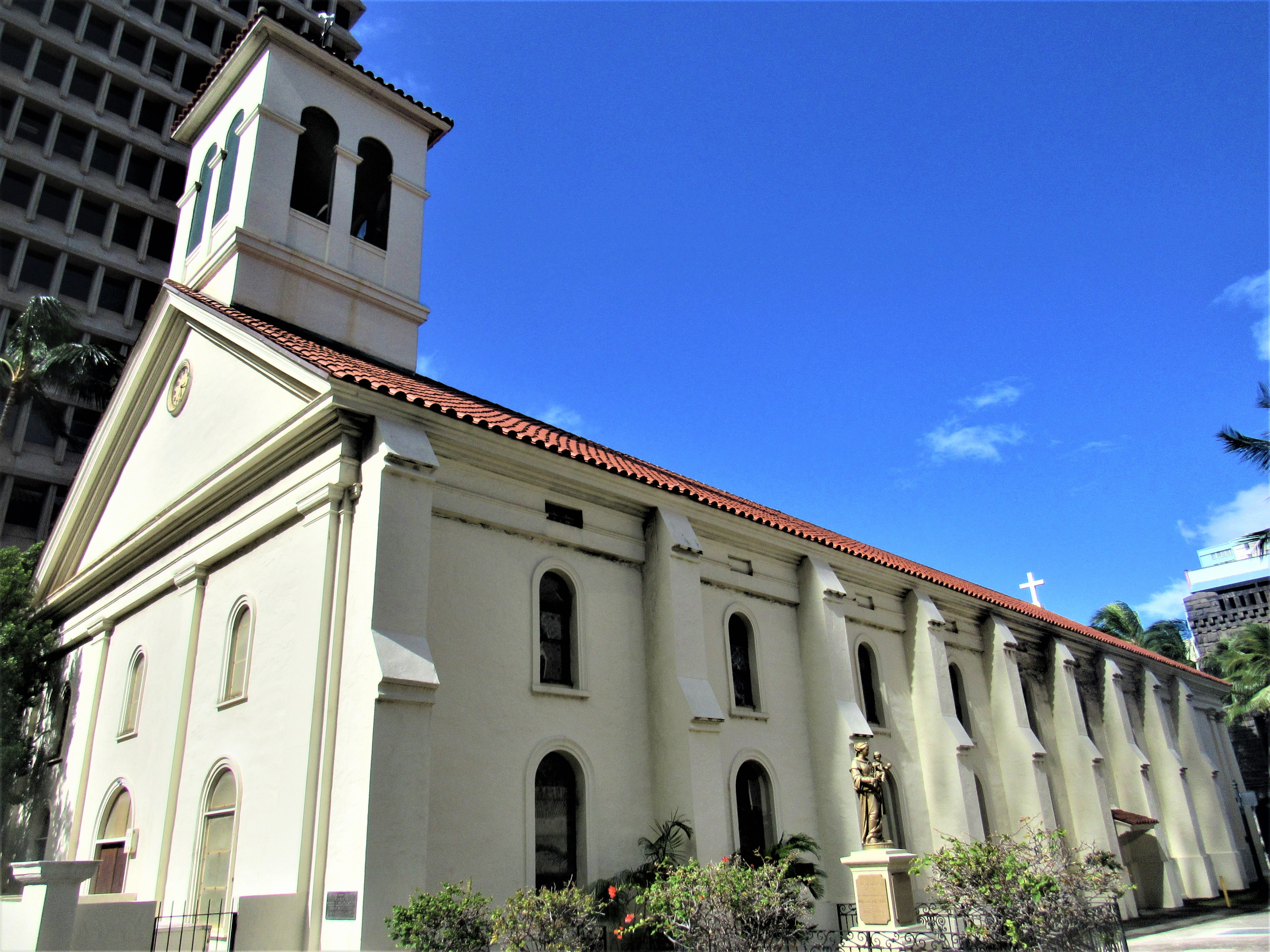
- Façade from the North
- Cathedral Basilica of Our Lady of Peace
- 21°18′39″N 157°51′34″W
- Location: 1175 Fort Street Mall; Honolulu, Hawaii
- Country: United States
- Denomination: Catholic
- Website: honolulucathedral.org

History
- Status: Cathedral; Minor basilica
- Dedicated: August 15, 1843

Architecture
- Functional status: Active
- Architectural type: Basilica
- Style: Romanesque Revival, Gothic Revival
- Groundbreaking: July 9, 1840
- Completed: August 15, 1843

Specifications
- Capacity: 600
- Length: 155.4 feet (47.4 m)
- Width: 51.3 feet (15.6 m)
- Materials: Coral, marble, plaster, terra cotta, Acacia koa

Administration
- Province: San Francisco (Region XIII)
- Diocese: Honolulu

Clergy
- Bishop: Most Rev. Michael T. Castori
- Rector: Pascual G. Abaya, IV
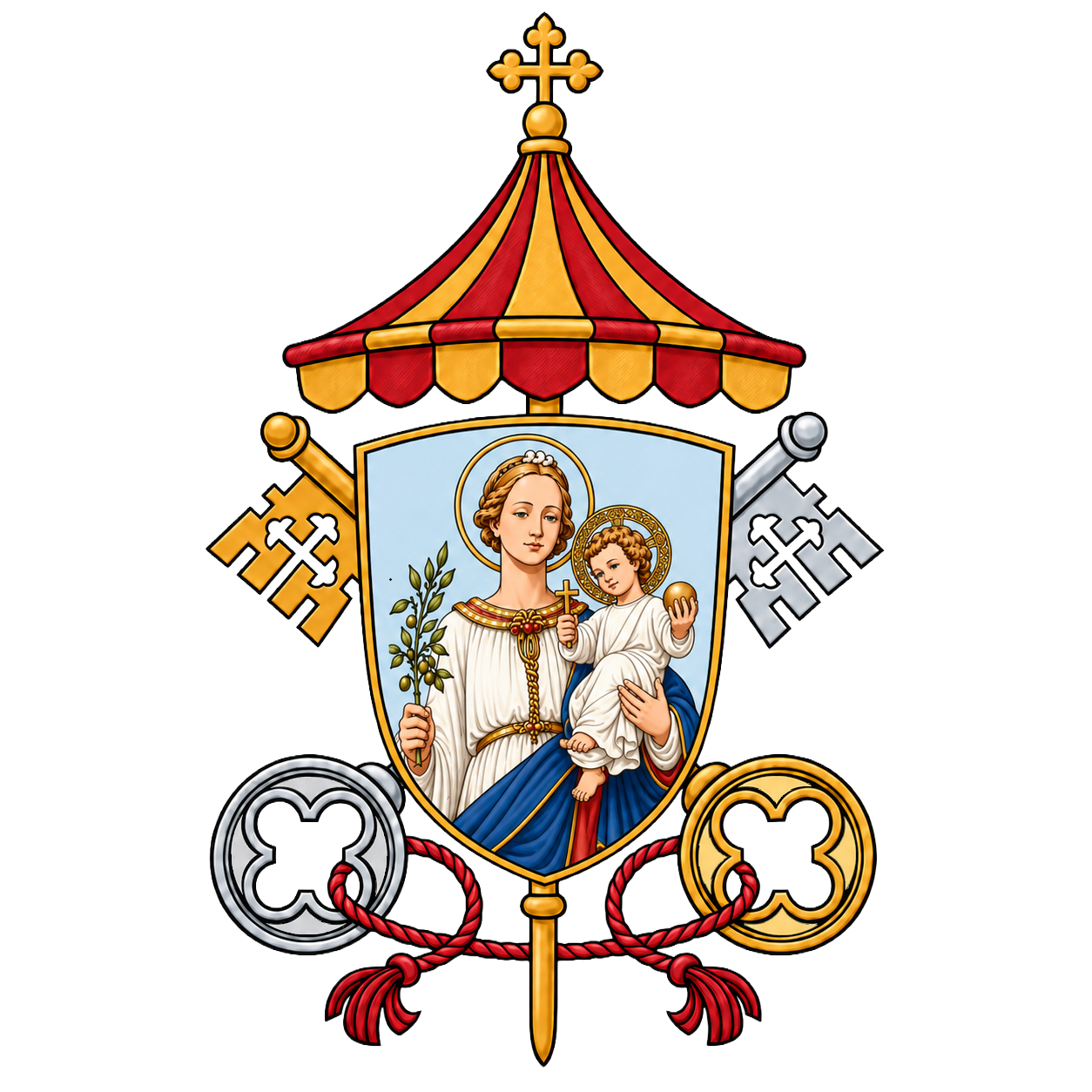
- Our Lady of Peace Cathedral
- U.S. National Register of Historic Places
- NRHP reference No.: 72000418
- Added to NRHP: August 7, 1972

The Cathedral Basilica of Our Lady of Peace is the mother church and cathedral of the Diocese of Honolulu.

== History ==
=== Groundbreaking ===
The first Catholic missionaries to Hawaii, three priests of the Congregation of the Sacred Hearts of Jesus and Mary (also known as the Society of Picpus), arrived in Honolulu from France on July 7, 1827. Apostolic prefect Alexis Bachelot celebrated the first recorded Catholic Mass on Hawaiian soil on July 14 in a grass hut on a rented lot. On August 30, 1827, the missionaries acquired a royal land grant from 14-year-old King Kamehameha III with the help from the Catholic governor of Oahu, high chief Boki. On this property, in January 1828, the French erected the first Catholic church in Hawaii, where the sanctuary of the cathedral is today.

Between between 1829 and 1839, however, with the King facing pressure from both American Protestant missionaries and the Kuhina Nui, Kaʻahumanu, Catholic priests were expelled from the islands to thwart any French or Catholic influence. During this "dark decade" of anti-Catholic persecution, foreign priests were deported and not allowed to come to shore, and known converts were tortured and imprisoned.

Under the threat of force from the French government, the Hawaiian government issued the Edict of Toleration on June 17, 1839, creating freedom of religious expression. As reparation, Kamehameha III gave the first Roman Catholic missionaries, under the leadership of Vicar Apostolic Étienne Rouchouze, a section of the royal estate on which to build the first Roman Catholic church in the kingdom, and $20,000 in compensation for the deportation of priests and the incarceration and torture of converts. The 1840 Constitution of the Kingdom of Hawaii enshrined religious liberty.

The missionaries broke ground for the new church on July 9, 1840, coinciding with the Feast of Our Lady of Peace, patroness saint of the Congregation of the Sacred Hearts, and dedicated their first church in the new land under this title of the Virgin Mary. A Mass was celebrated on the day of groundbreaking and 280 native Hawaiians received the sacraments of baptism, confirmation, and first Eucharist. The cornerstone of the building was ceremonially laid on August 6, 1840. Construction continued after groundbreaking with native Hawaiian volunteers harvesting blocks of coral from the shores of Ala Moana, Kakaʻako, and Waikīkī. Down the street, Congregationalist missionaries had earlier begun the construction of Kawaiahaʻo Church.

=== Development ===
On August 15, 1843, the Cathedral of Our Lady of Peace was consecrated and dedicated, and about 800 people received holy communion.

When Louis Désiré Maigret inherited the church, the interior was furnished with a simple wooden altar, communion rail and pulpit. Instead of pews, the native Hawaiians preferred to sit on the floor covered in lauhala mats. Maigret had purchased a tower clock and cathedra, and a new larger bell. Maigret had built the first domed bell tower in the Hawaiian Islands, but he would later replace it with a wooden spire topped with a globus cruciger and a stationary rooster finial in 1866, often mistaken for a weather vane.

In the 1870s, after returning from the First Vatican Council, Maigret was inspired to continue improvements to the cathedral. In 1871, the low roof was replaced with redwood and raised by four feet. A vaulted ceiling with panels of hand-painted gold leaf decorations was installed. A choir loft and galleries overlooking the nave were built to increase the seating capacity and new stained glass windows were added. Thirty-six statuettes of the saints were placed above the gallery overlooking the nave partly as spite towards the Congregationalists and Presbyterians who accused Catholics of idolatry. Extensive work was done to install a French marble altar which had a poignant backdrop scene of Calvary. It was crowned by the gilded statues of the Virgin Mary, Saint Joachim and Saint Anne. The clock, which was originally positioned at the base of the tower, was now fitted on the back wall after the roof was raised and remains the oldest clock in Hawaii. Throughout his thirty-five years as bishop, Maigret transformed the humble grass hut into a European-styled church before dying in 1882.

The cathedral would remain rather unchanged for the next two decades. In December 1893, on the sixty-second anniversary of the first expulsion from the Hawaiian Islands of the first prefect apostolic, Msgr. Gulstan Ropert dedicated a large bronze statue of Our Lady of Peace, a recreation of an original 16th century wooden carving still venerated by the Congregation of the Sacred Hearts in their Paris convent.

When Libert Hubert John Louis Boeynaems inherited the church in 1903, he idealized the cathedral to be like the more famous Gothic churches of his native Europe, perhaps motivated by the nearby Anglican St. Andrew's Cathedral which was completed in 1902. He commissioned the construction of an elaborate porch which was completed in 1910. However, the Gothic endeavor became too costly to complete. Instead, he replaced the termite damaged wooden floors with cement and the wooden spire with a concrete bell tower topped with the original orb and cross installed by Maigret.

In 1926, Stephen Peter Alencastre assumed the episcopacy of the Hawaiian Islands. Not long after his appointment, Alencastre purchased land at the base of Punchbowl Crater to build a new cathedral. Stymied by the Great Depression of 1929, the project was cancelled. Instead, he established the present-day Romanesque revival style for the cathedral. The Gothic porch was replaced by a portico of doric columns. New stained-glass windows from Germany were installed. The Italian government presented a gift of a new Carrara marble altar with statues of the Blessed Virgin Mary and Saint Joseph, in anticipation for the celebration of the centennial of the arrival of the first Roman Catholic missionaries to the Hawaiian Islands. In 1940, steel trusses and concrete buttresses were added to support the terra cotta tiled roof that were installed in 1926.

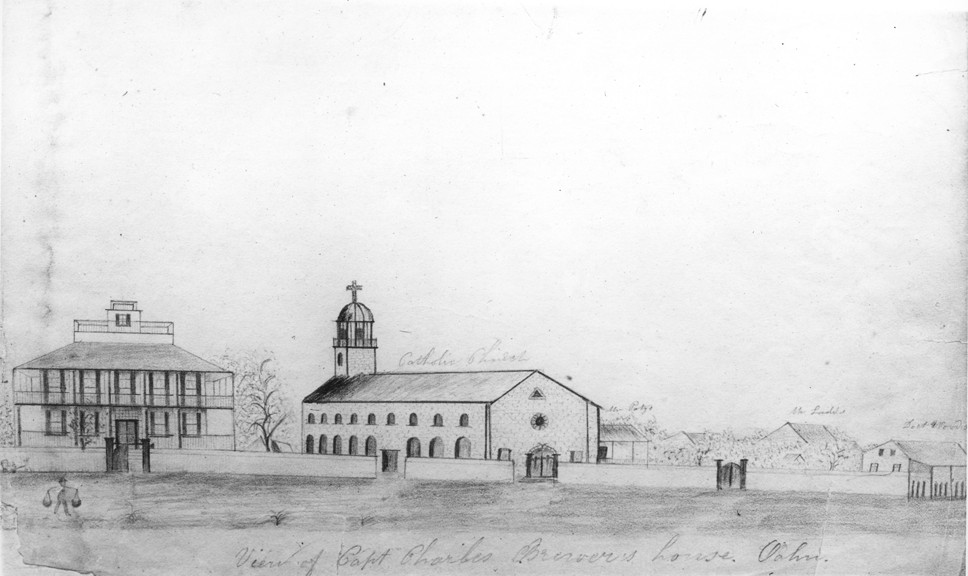
Drawing 1843, with domed tower

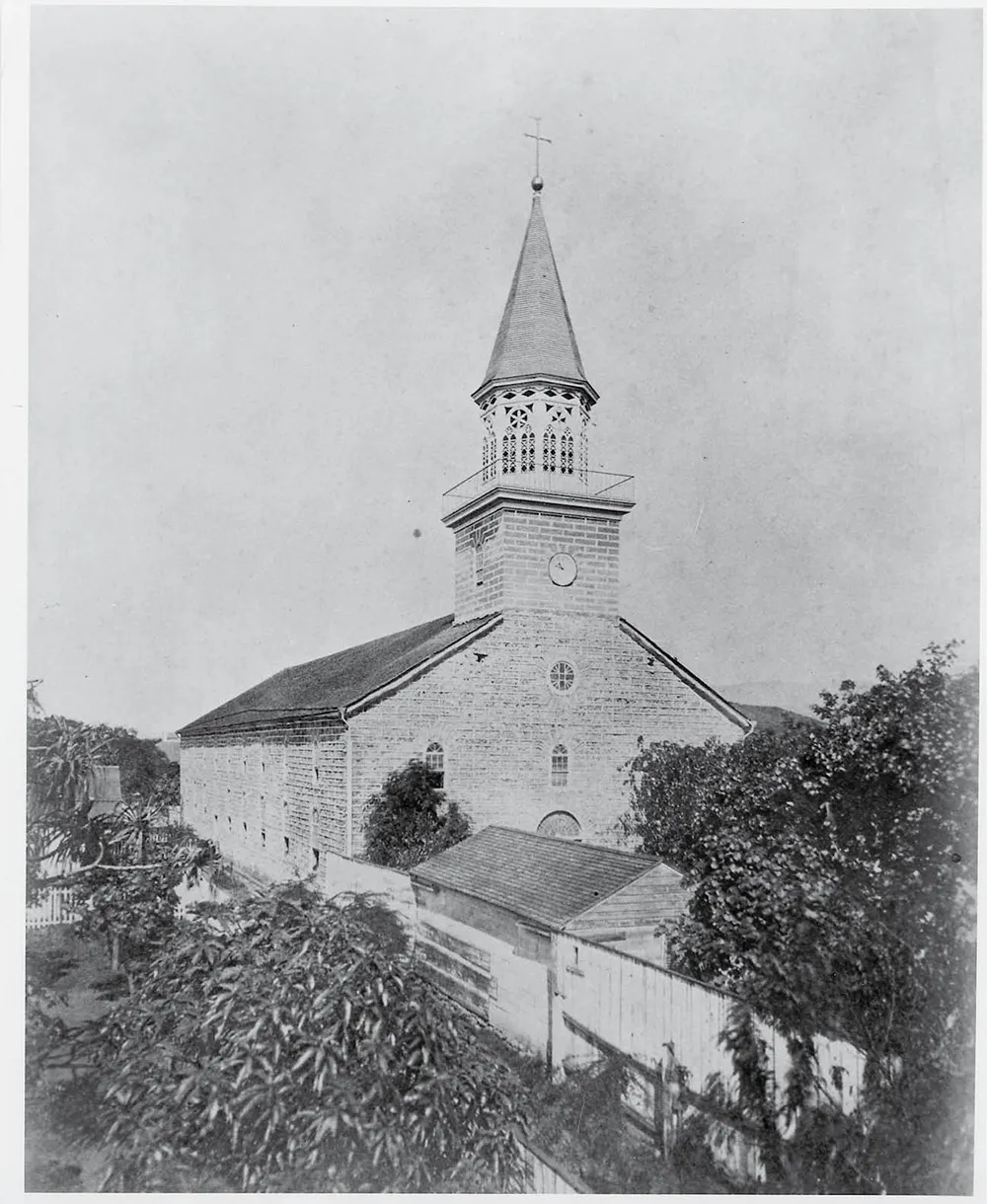
1867, before the roof was raised

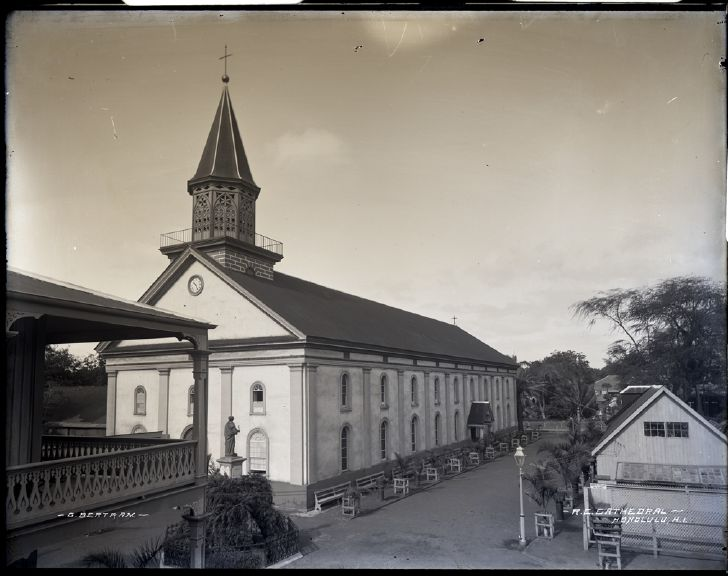
Between 1883 and 1905

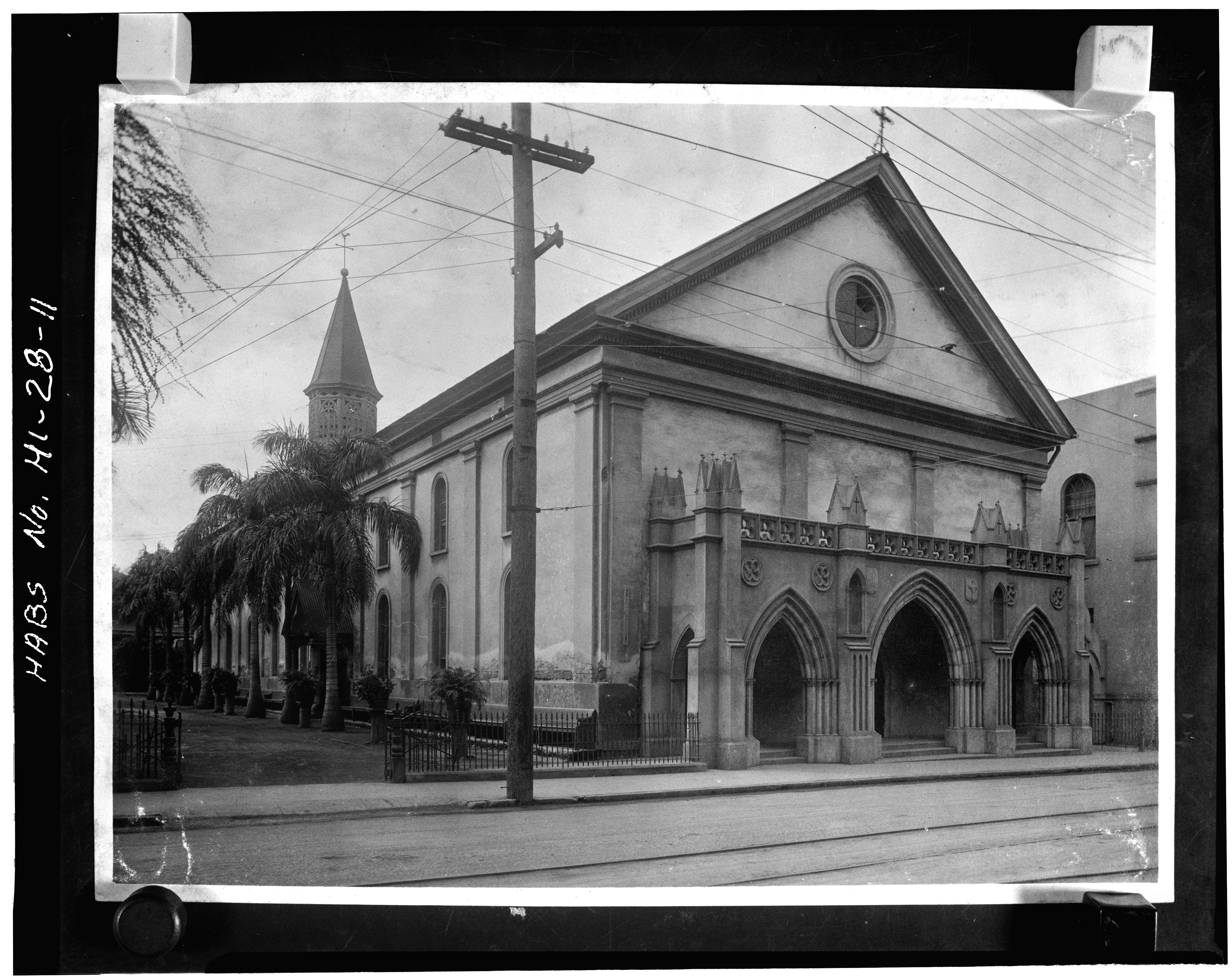
Gothic porch 1910

=== Second Vatican Council ===
James Joseph Sweeney, was the first bishop of newly formed Diocese of Honolulu. In 1956, Bishop Sweeney made some significant changes to the interior. The wooden crucifix was removed and replaced with one made of marble, and behind it, the Calvary scene was painted over and a simple fleur-de-lis patterned wallpaper was added. A gothic tester (or "baldachin") was positioned above the high altar to match the canopy over the cathedra, then a bronze tabernacle and communion rails were fitted.

Liturgically innovative ideas in the 1960s and 1970s took hold of some liturgists and theologians after the Second Vatican Council. These ideas, which claimed to follow the "spirit of the council," inaugurated controversial changes in the architectural standards of churches worldwide, which some Catholics dub a "wreckovation". Sweeney, a council father at the Second Vatican Council, ordered for the communion rails to be removed and a freestanding altar constructed to allow a priest to face the congregation during Mass instead of ad orientem as indicated in the changes to the new Roman Missal. The elevated canopied pulpit was also removed in favor of a simple lectern to serve as an ambo. The ideology of this time encouraged churches to use native cultural implements in church architecture. Koa wood wainscot along the walls and heavy koa wood doors were installed.

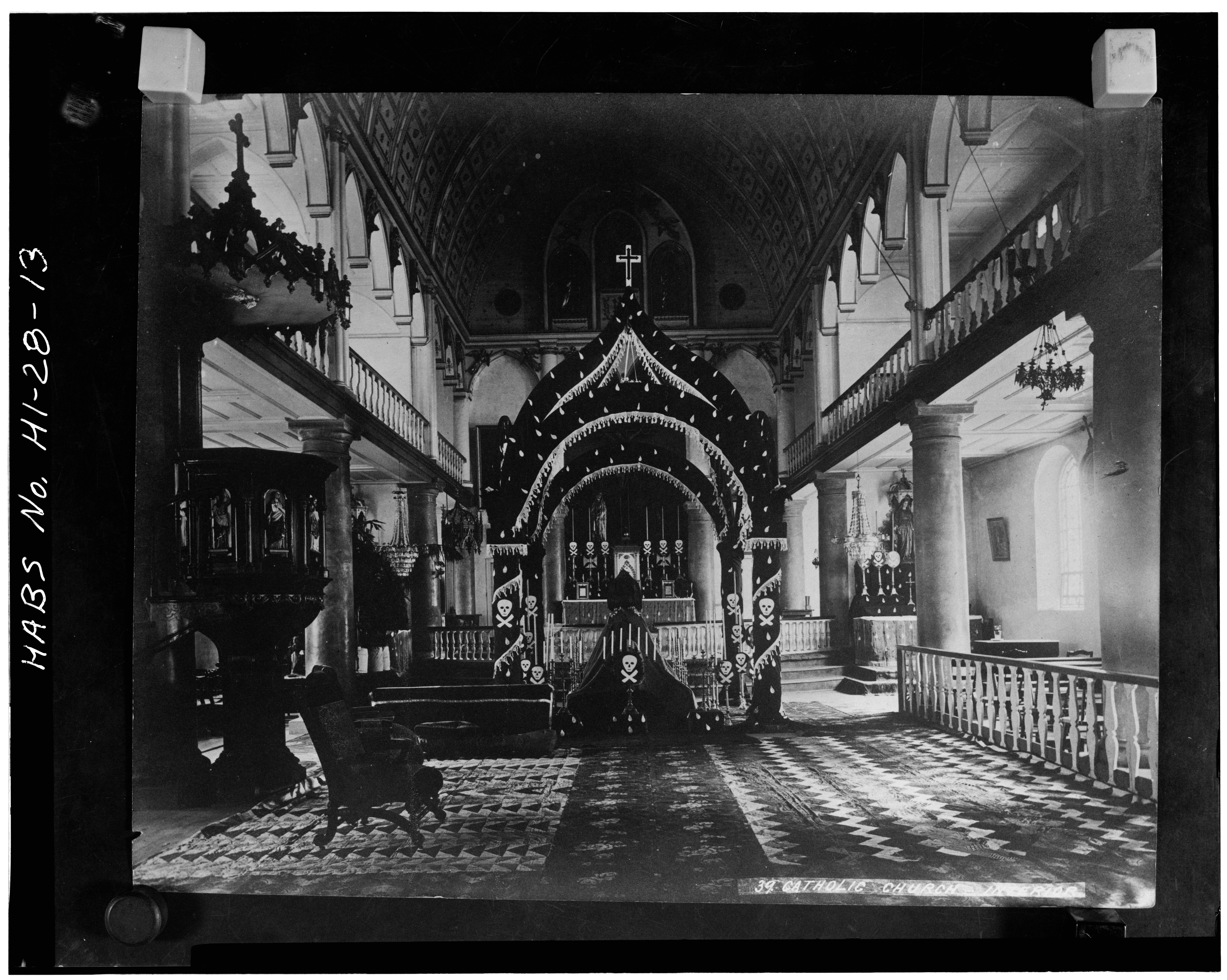
1886, Altar of Repose for
King Alfonso XII of Spain

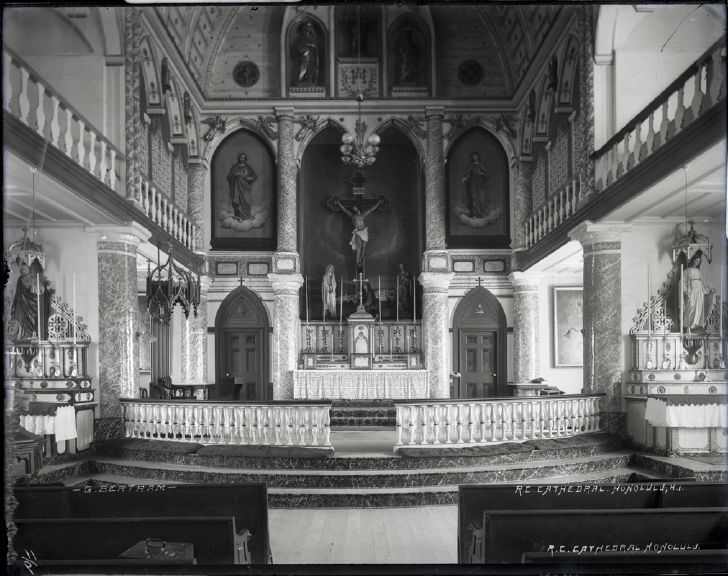
c. 1900

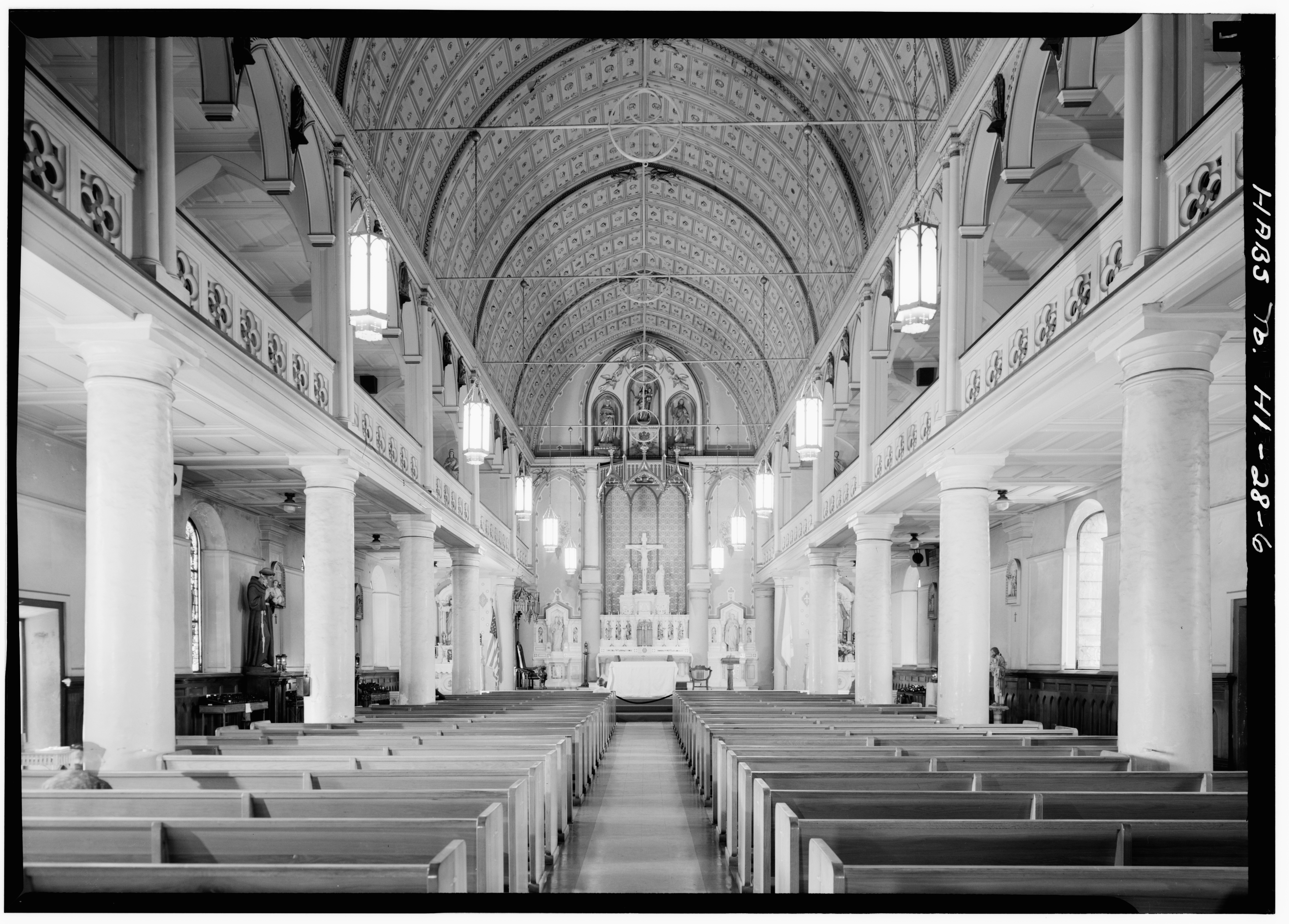
Changes to the sanctuary after Vatican II c. 1970s

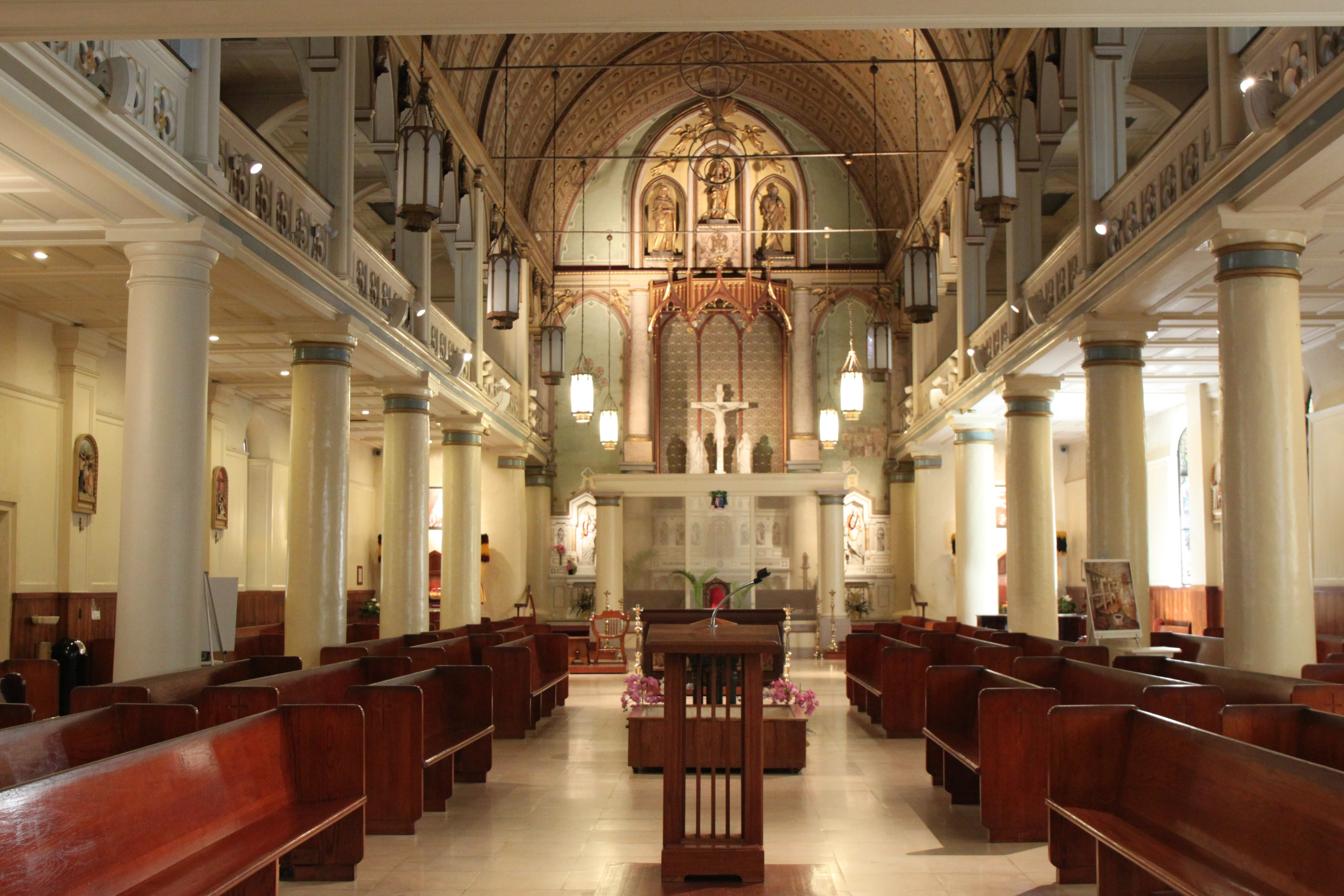
2014

=== Post-Vatican II ===
The cathedral had become too small to accommodate the increased population since its vicariate apostolic times. Joseph Anthony Ferrario, the third bishop of the diocese, successfully petitioned Pope John Paul II to elevate Saint Theresa Catholic Church to a co-cathedral in 1984.

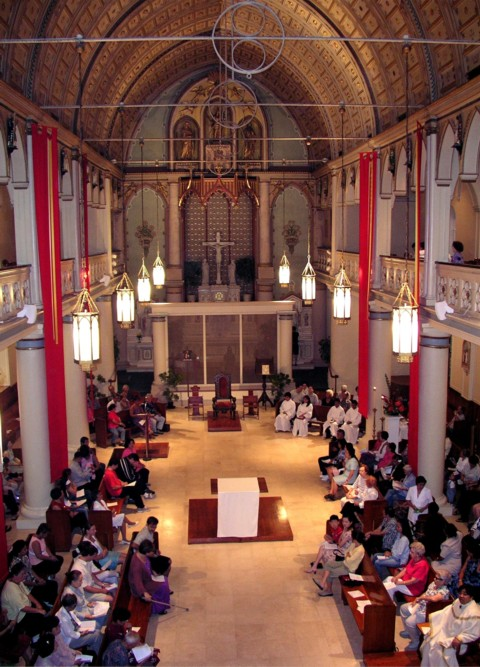
c. 1990s

Meanwhile, Ferrario was also responsible for sending the thirty-six statuettes of saints back to France to be professionally preserved. When the statues returned, they were placed in a new, more logical order of placement in accordance with the Litany of the Saints. In one of the most drastic changes yet, pews were re-arranged to face each other while the altar and ambo were positioned in the center aisle in 1993. A eucharistic devotional area was created in front of the tabernacle and a semitransparent screen was raised to separate it from the rest of the church. The cathedra of the bishop was placed in front of this screen and the sedia, or the chair of the priest-celebrant, was positioned among the pews.

Francis X. DiLorenzo, fourth bishop of Honolulu hired architects to draft plans for an expansion of the cathedral but never progressed. DiLorenzo's capital improvement projects included the replacement of the flooring with stone tiles and installation of new sound systems.

In 2010, a $15M campaign was initiated by the fifth and current bishop, Clarence Richard Silva, to renovate the cathedral emulating the appearance of the later 1800s during the time of Damien de Veuster. The "renewal" project also includes installing replica oil-paintings of the Stations of the Cross that were present in the cathedral during the time period, "oil lamp" chandeliers, and confessionals. Other major plans include building a new chapel that will house the relics of both St. Damien de Veuster and St. Marianne Cope.

By 2018, at the hundred seventy-fifth anniversary of the dedication of the cathedral, Silva removed the screen and returned the altar back to an extensively renovated sanctuary area. The pews were also positioned back to their ad orientem direction. Four of the fourteen stained-glass windows were repaired and refurbished in Omaha. A few years later, the pillars were repaired and replastered then repainted to mimic marbled stone, and new paintings of saints Damien and Marianne were placed in the sanctuary wall above the high altar.

== Historical significance ==
Its perilous beginnings and fruitful growth has left an indelible mark on the history of Hawaii. The cathedral is reminder of the great religious struggles that took place in the Hawaiian Kingdom between 1820 and 1850, and as a symbol of its final acceptance of the Catholic Church. It was the church in which Damien de Veuster was ordained to the presbyterate on May 21, 1864, the starting point in the ministry of Mother Marianne Cope in Hawaii on November 8, 1883, and also the church where the Requiem Mass for Joseph Kahahawai was conducted in 1932. It is the oldest existing building in the downtown area of Honolulu. Considering the earliness of its construction date, it is also of considerable aesthetic value and is unique in its architectural design in Hawaii. The Cathedral Basilica of Our Lady of Peace was placed on the Hawaii Register of Historic Places and National Register of Historic Places in 1972.

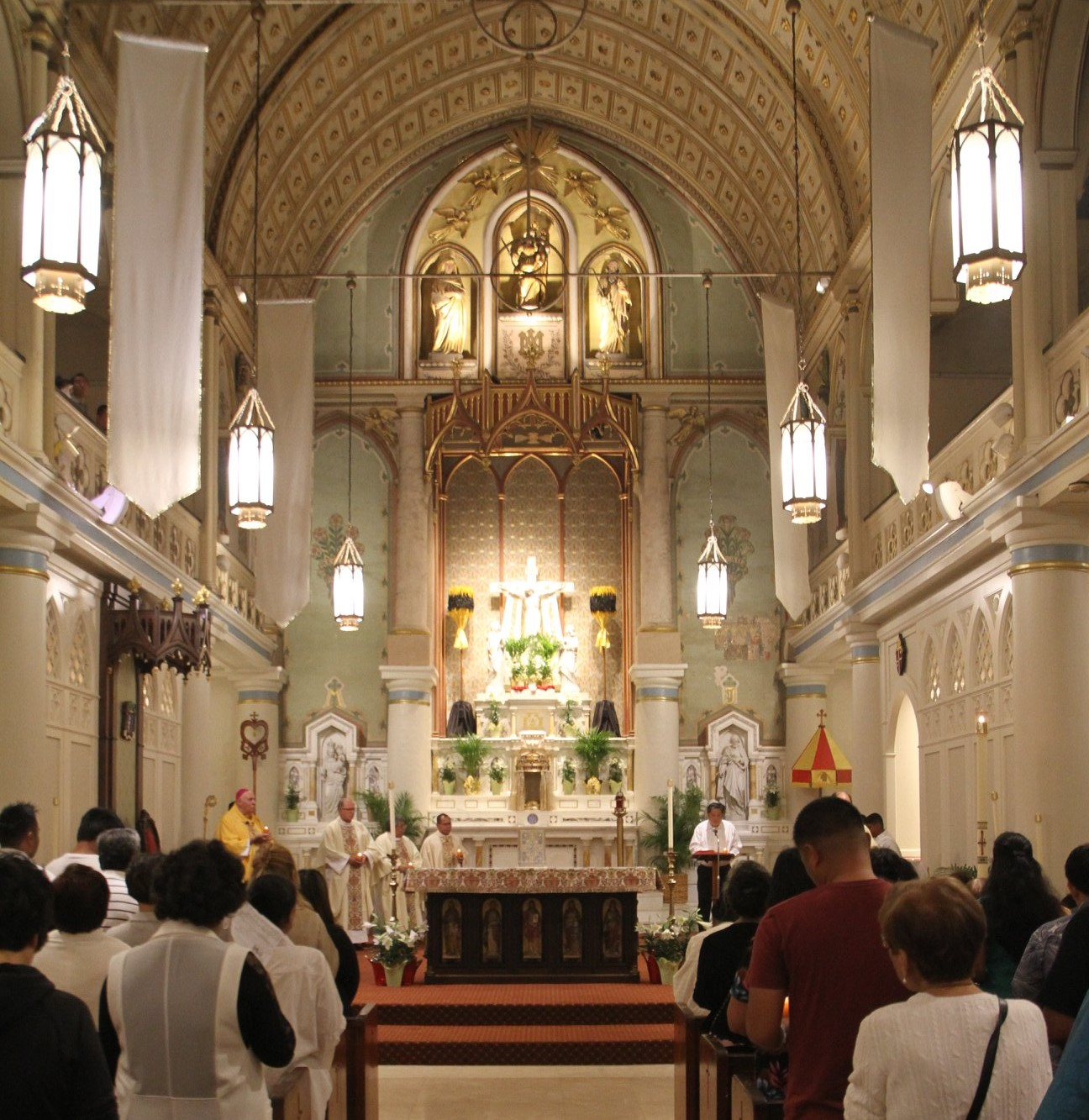
Tintinnabulum, umbraculum and kahili flanking crucifix 2018

The Cathedral Basilica of Our Lady of Peace is said to be the oldest cathedral in continuous use in the United States. Though older, the Basilica of the National Shrine of the Assumption of the Blessed Virgin Mary in Baltimore, completed in 1821, was a co-cathedral throughout its history. The current Saint Louis Cathedral in New Orleans was completed in 1850 after the Great New Orleans Fire destroyed the original 1727 church in 1788. The Royal Presidio Chapel, completed in 1791, was designated a pro-cathedral in 1849.

=== Burials ===
Following the Requiem Mass (funeral) of Bishop Louis-Désiré Maigret in 1882, his body was carried in procession to the King Street Cemetery but was not buried there. His final resting place goes unrecorded for 100 years until his tomb is discovered under the sanctuary of the cathedral during renovations in 1981. Other vicar apostolics were buried at the King Street Cemetery.

The only other bishop buried at the cathedral is John Joseph Scanlan who was buried in an adjacent space near Maigret after his death in 1997. Four additional spaces were created for future prelates in the renovations that were completed in 2018.

The mortal remains of St. Marianne Cope were enshrined on July 31, 2014. The Sisters of St. Francis of the Neumann Communities announced that they were closing their motherhouse in Syracuse where the remains were originally. The remains are encased in a reliquary near the sanctuary next to the relic of St. Damien.

=== Elevation to a Minor Basilica ===
Pope Francis, through the Congregation for Divine Worship and the Discipline of the Sacraments, conferred the title of Minor Basilica upon the Cathedral on May 10, 2014, the liturgical memorial of St. Damien. The inaugural Mass was celebrated on October 11, 2014, the fifth anniversary of the canonization of St. Damien. The privileges attached to the status of minor basilica include the right of the umbraculum (ceremonial canopy) and the tintinnabulum (ceremonial bell), which were carried in procession and installed at this inaugural Mass.

== Pipe organ ==
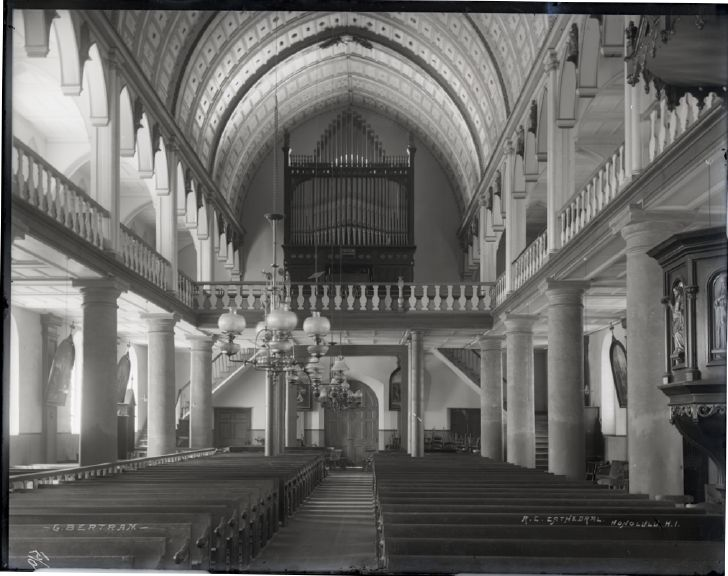
Choir loft and second organ photographed by Brother Bertram c. 1900s

The first pipe organ, installed shortly after the cathedral was built, came from France and had one manual and a pedal clavier. The second organ, fitted in 1885, was built in England as the gift of parishioner Godfrey Rhodes, featuring great, swell, and pedal organs. The large statue of Saint Cecilia, patroness of sacred music, was placed on the casing in front of the organ in 1906.

The third and present one, Opus 916, consists of great, swell, choir, and pedal organs installed in the choir loft by organ-builder Alfred G. Tickner of the Aeolian-Skinner Organ Company of Boston. It features 3 manuals, 37 stops, 33 ranks, and 2,159 pipes. This instrument was solemnly blessed on September 9, 1934, by Msgr. Stephen Alencastre, followed by a dedicatory recital by organist Don George, broadcast over radio station KGU in Honolulu.

== Campus ==
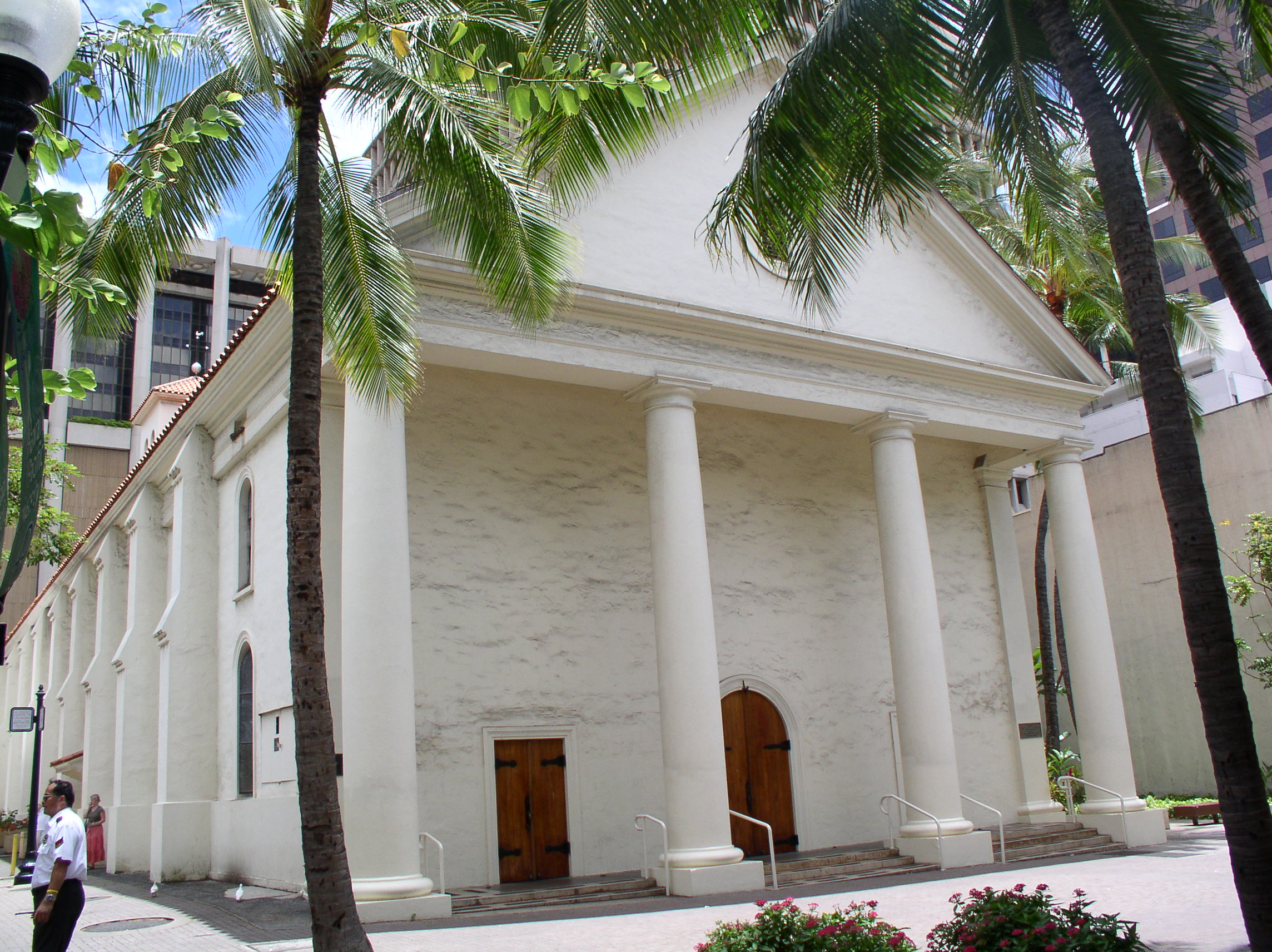
West façade and main entrance, Fort Street Mall

The church at 1175 Fort Street Mall is just one building in a larger campus owned by the Diocese of Honolulu and purchased during the Hawaiian Kingdom Era from Charles Brewer, Charles Reed Bishop, Julius Anthon, Joseph Carter, Alexander Muir, James Makee and Romila Whiting. Much of the land was formerly used as a boarding and day school in the late 1800s – the predecessor institution of Saint Louis School. The campus includes the Diocesan Chancery which houses the offices of the bishop and vicar general, as well as the Hawaiʻi Catholic Herald newspaper. The same high-rise building also houses the rectory, the office and residence of the rector, the parochial vicar and other priests serving the Cathedral Basilica of Our Lady of Peace.

The diocese has leased some of the campus to commercial entities. The Century Square building, a modern skyscraper at 1188 Bishop Street, is rented as office and residential space. Finance Factors is a minority landowner where the Finance Factors building sits. Plans are in place for a new affordable housing development for seniors where the parish hall used to stand. Directly beneath the campus is a cavernous basin dug by early missionaries as a freshwater well. It is now leased to a private company which operates it as an underground public parking lot.

== Gallery ==
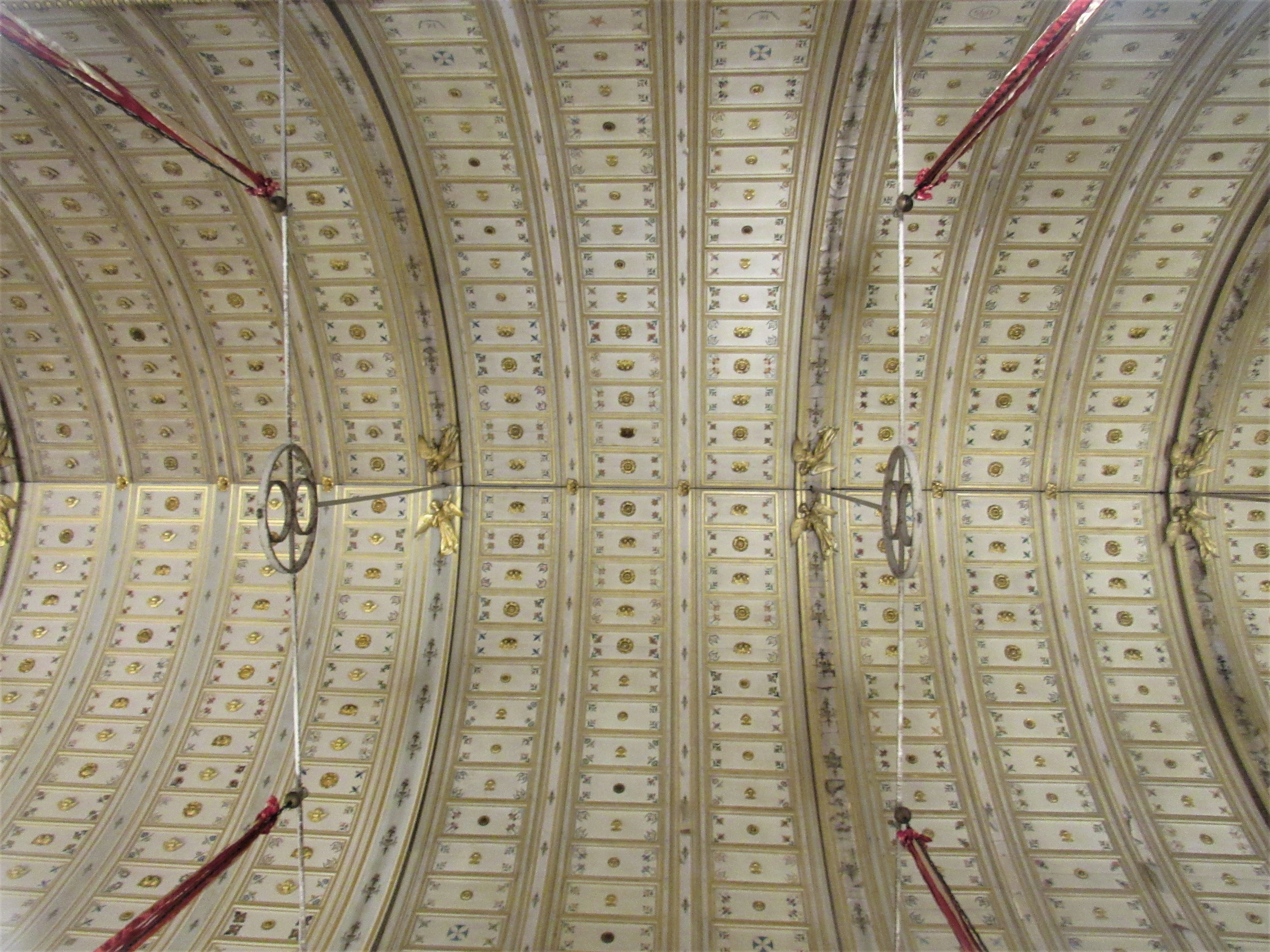
Paneled (pointed barrel) ceiling commissioned by Bishop Maigret

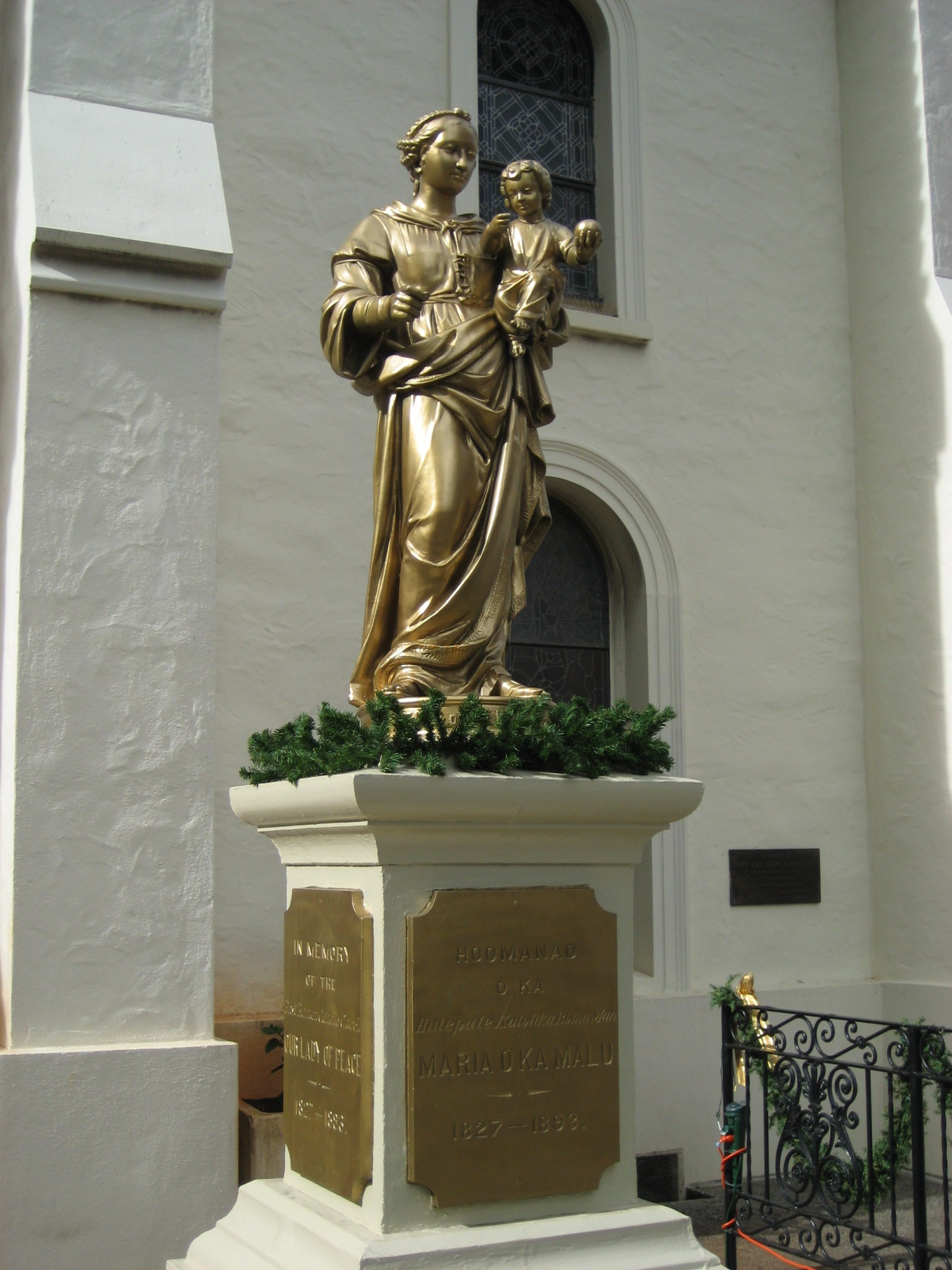
Statue of Our Lady of Peace with plaques in English, French, Portuguese, and Hawaiian with the words, "In memory of the first Roman Catholic Church, Our Lady of Peace 1827 to 1893."

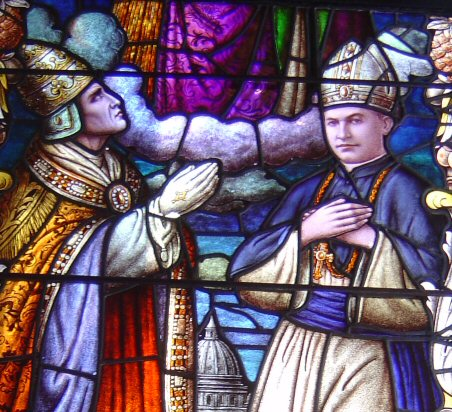
Depiction of Pope Pius XI blessing Stephen Peter Alencastre as fifth and last Vicar Apostolic of the Hawaiian Islands

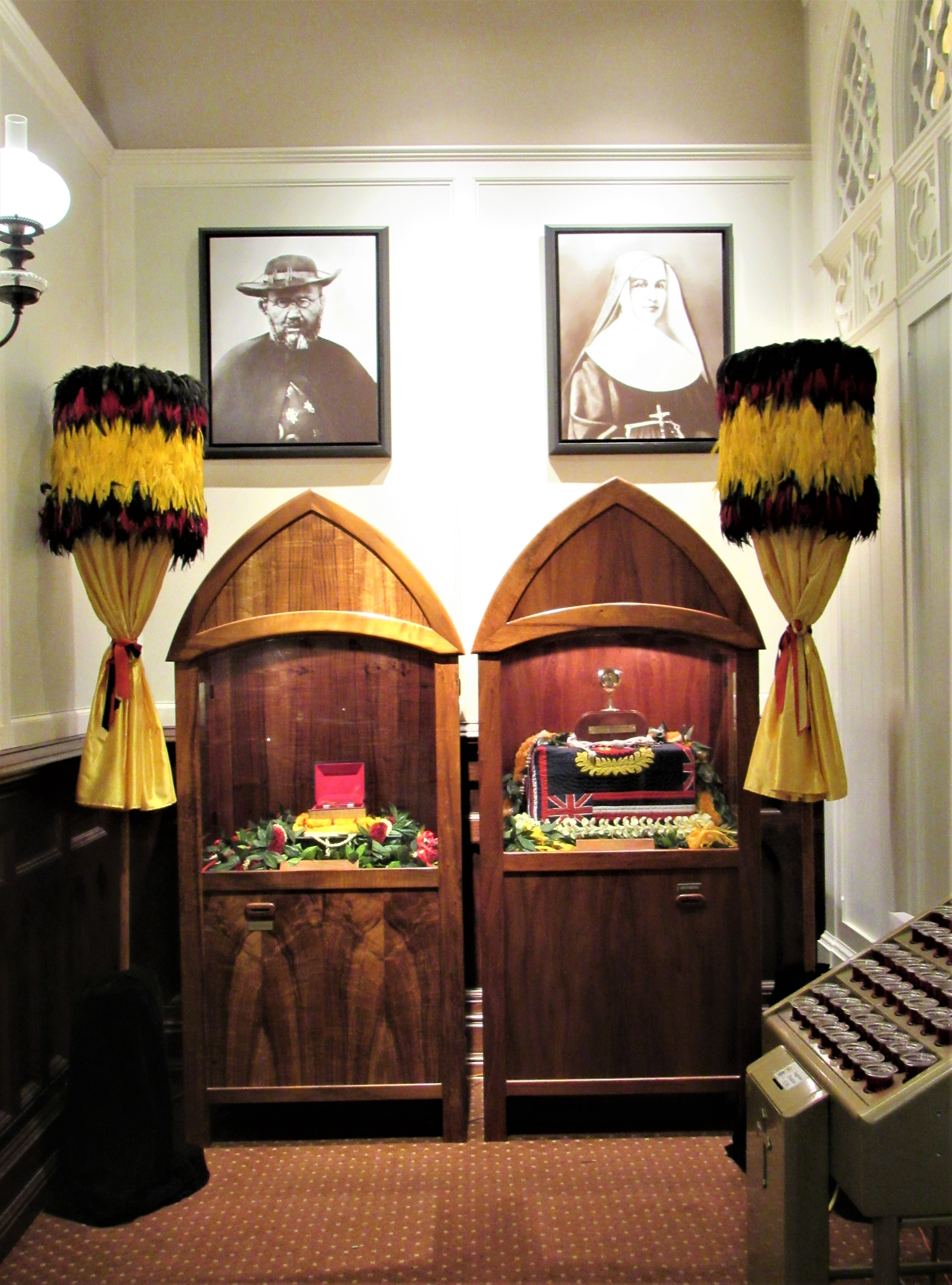
Reliquaries of Saints Damien de Veuster and Marianne Cope

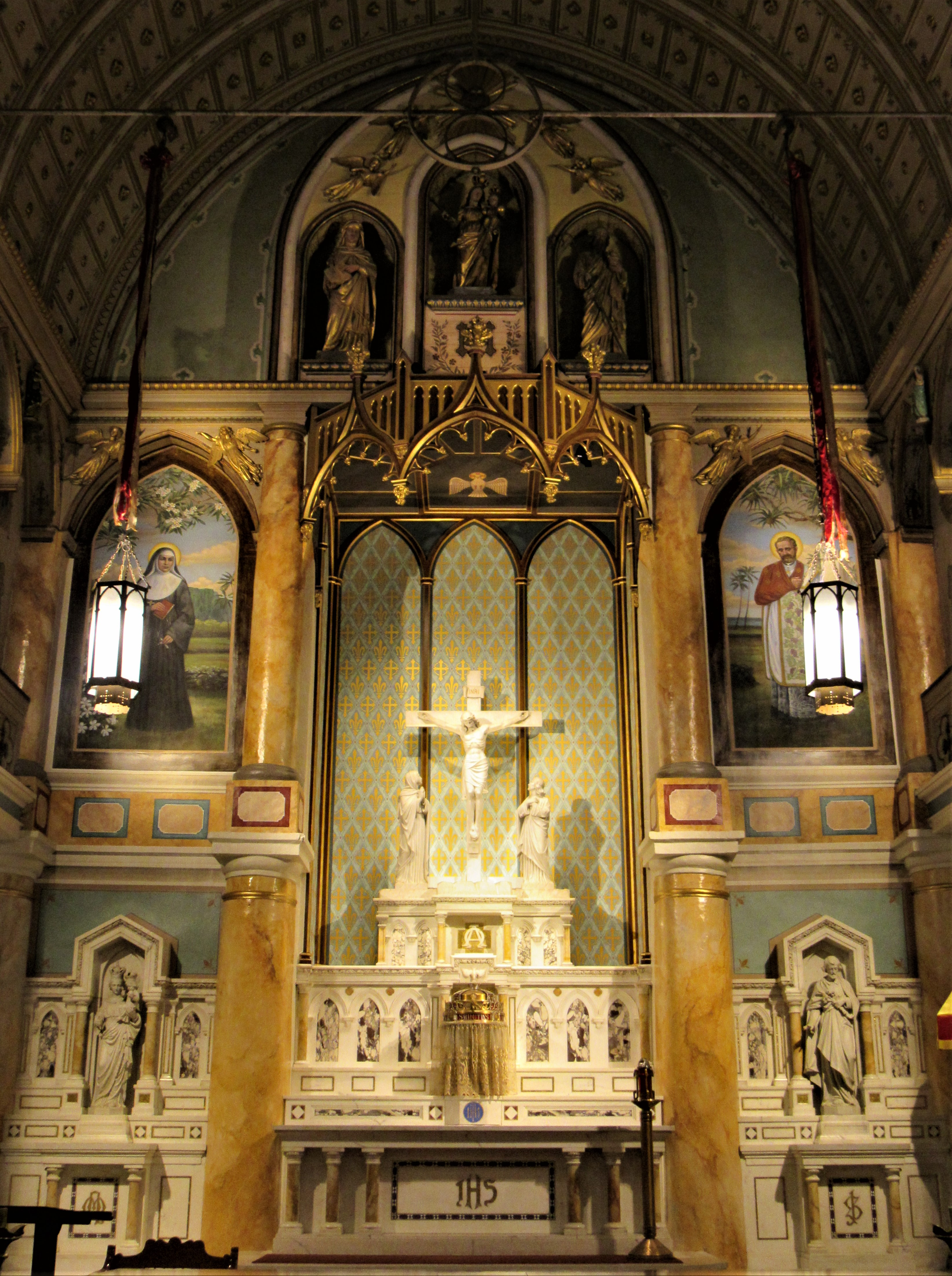
High altar with the painting of Saints Marianne and Damien, c. 2020

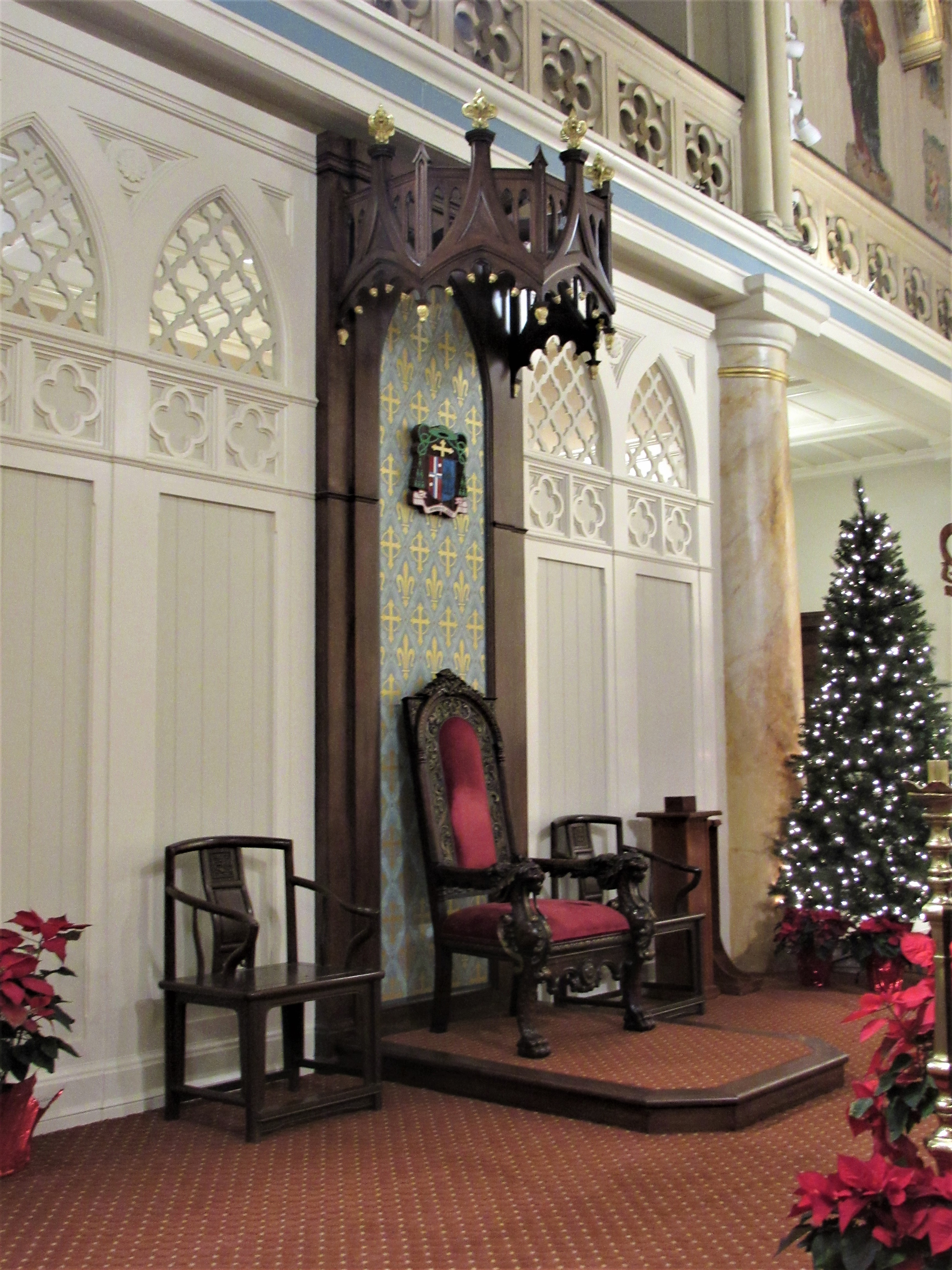
The cathedra, or throne of the bishop

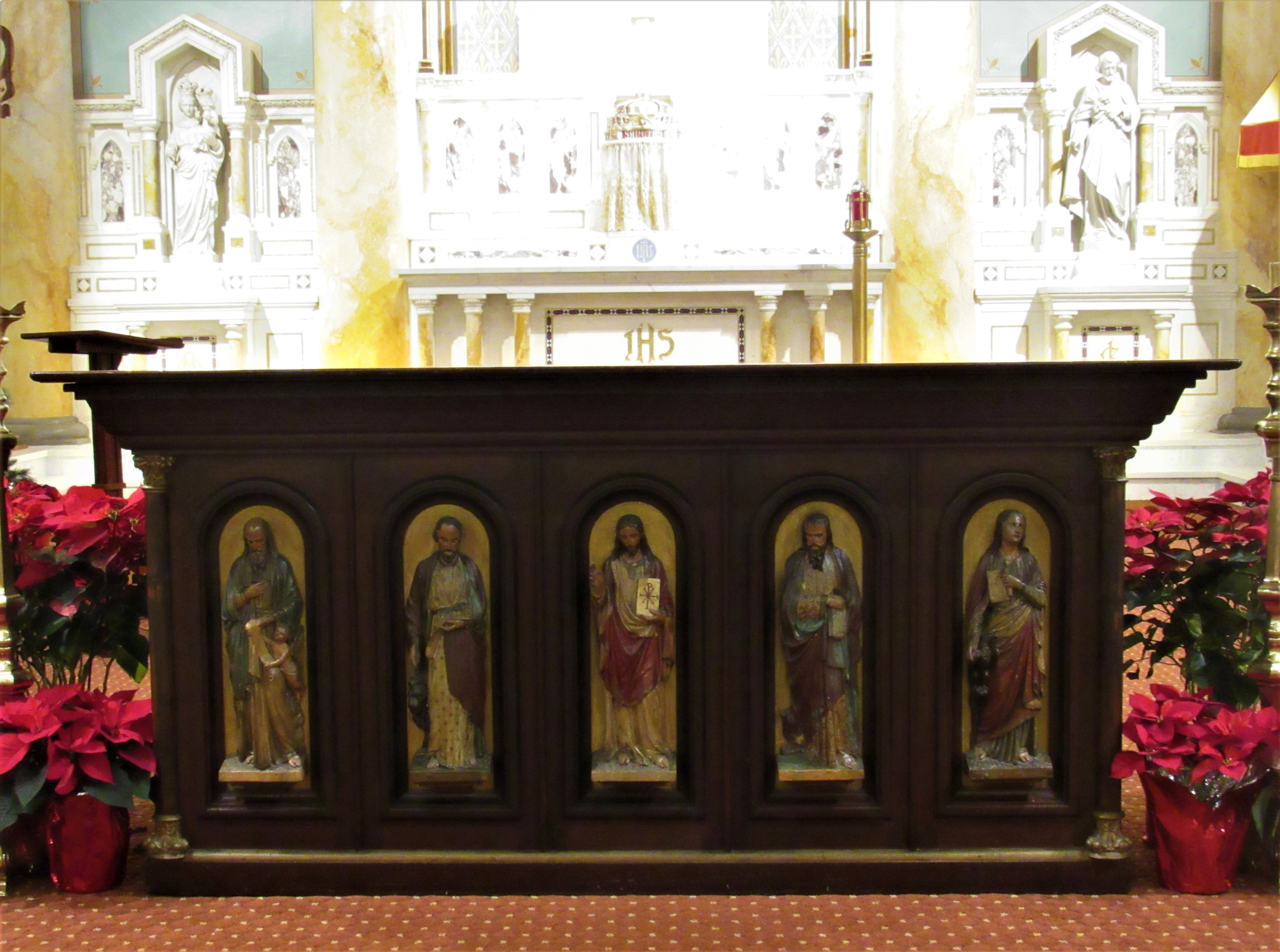
Figures of Jesus and the saints on the altar were once a part of the pulpit

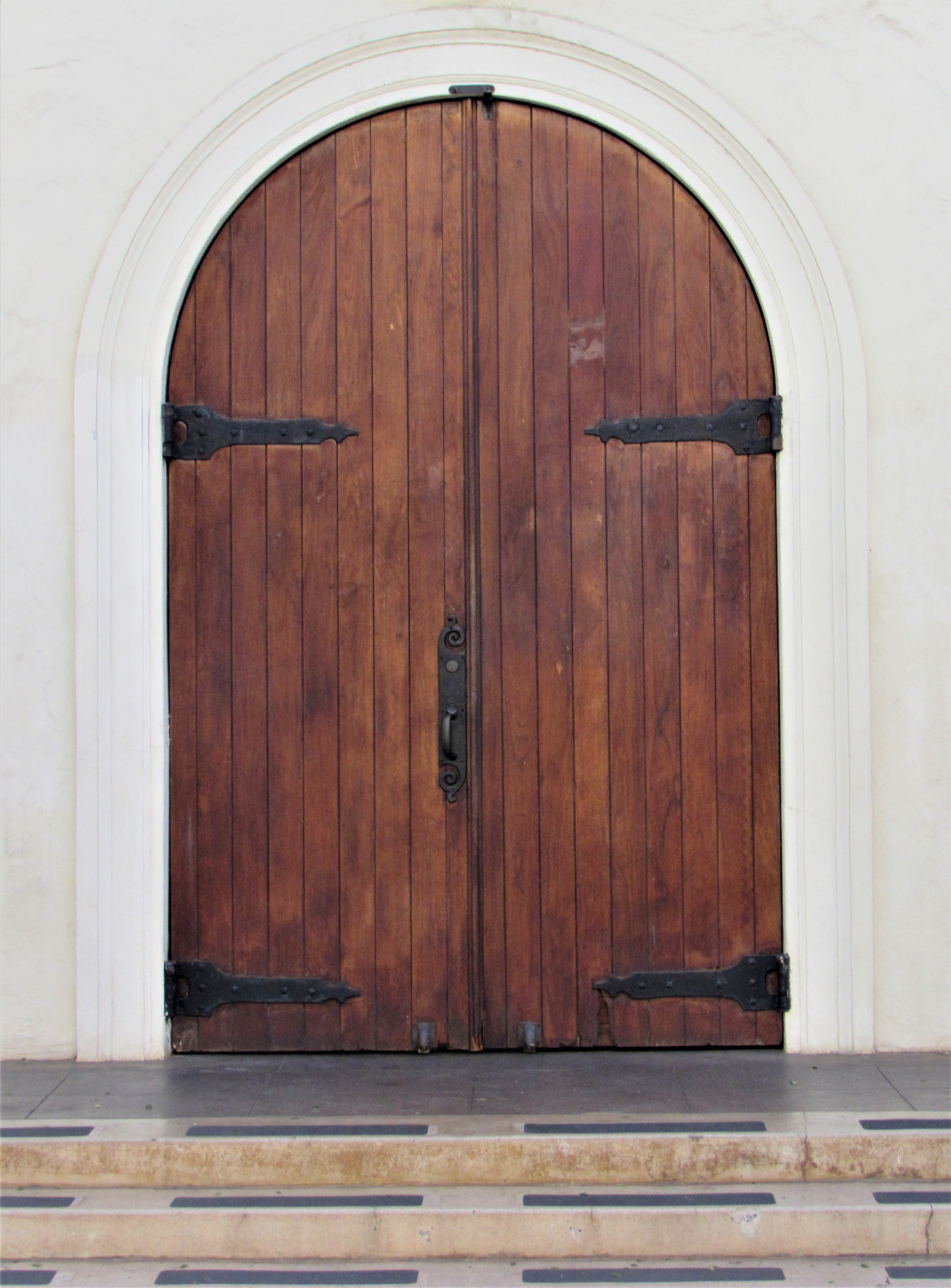
Main doors of the bishop, made of koa

== See also ==
- Saint Damien of Molokai
- Saint Marianne Cope
- Cathedral Church of Saint Andrew, Honolulu
- Co-Cathedral of Saint Theresa of the Child Jesus
- List of the Roman Catholic bishops of the United States
- List of Catholic cathedrals in the United States
- List of cathedrals in the United States
- List of the Roman Catholic dioceses of the United States
- List of basilicas
