= Joseph Anthony Ferrario =

American bishop

His Excellency, The Most Reverend Joseph Anthony Ferrario
- Bishop Emeritus of Honolulu
- Church: Roman Catholic
- Diocese: Honolulu
- In office: 1982-1993
- Predecessor: John Joseph Scanlan
- Successor: Francis Xavier DiLorenzo

Orders
- Ordination: May 19, 1951
- Consecration: January 13, 1978 by John Joseph Scanlan

Personal details
- Born: March 3, 1926 Scranton, Pennsylvania, United States
- Died: December 12, 2003 (aged 77)
- Motto: My grace is all you need

Styles of Joseph Anthony Ferrario
- Reference style: His Excellency; The Most Reverend
- Spoken style: Your Excellency
- Religious style: Bishop

Joseph Anthony Ferrario (March 3, 1926 – December 12, 2003) was an American prelate of the Roman Catholic Church who served as the third bishop of the Diocese of Honolulu from 1982 to 1993. He previously serve as an auxiliary bishop of the diocese from 1978 to 1982.

During the 1990s and 2000s, Ferrario was accused by several individuals of sexually abusing them when they were minors.

== Early life and priestly ministry ==
Joseph Ferrario was born in March 3, 1926, in Scranton, Pennsylvania. Ferrario was ordained to the priesthood for the Society of Saint Sulpice on May 19, 1951, at Saint Peter's Cathedral in Scranton.

The Sulpicians sent Ferrario to Hawaii in 1957 to teach at the Saint Stephen Seminary, in Kailua. In 1968, Ferrario was transferred, or incardinated, from the Supicians to the Diocese of Honolulu. The diocese assigned him in 1973 as pastor of Holy Trinity Parish in Kuliouou, Hawaii.

== Auxiliary Bishop and Bishop of Honolulu ==
Ferrario was appointed as titular bishop of Cusae and auxiliary bishop of Honolulu by Pope John Paul II on November 8, 1977. On January 13, 1978, he was consecrated by Bishop John Joseph Scanlan in Honolulu. Ferrario was appointed bishop of Honolulu by John Paul II on May 13, 1982.

One of his first actions as the ordinary of Honolulu was the removal of Monsignor Francis A. Marzen as editor of the diocesan newspaper, the Hawai‘i Catholic Herald. Marzen had served as editor of the newspaper for approximately twenty years under the two previous bishops and publicly complained of his dismissal in an acerbic parting editorial published in the Hawai‘i Catholic Herald.

Ferrario revamped major diocesan offices and appointed pastors to parishes that were supportive of his vision of implementing the Second Vatican Ecumenical Council. Ferrario's work in renewing the Honolulu diocese earned him the respect of many people in the Church in Hawai‘i.

In 1985, the mother of David Figueroa, a member of St. Anthony's Parish in Kailua, Hawaii. sent a message to church authorities. She claimed that Ferrario had sexually assaulted her son at the parish in 1975 when he was 15-years-old. Ferrario denied the charges and he was cleared by the Vatican in 1989. That same year, Figueroa appeared on the Geraldo Rivera Show to accuse of sexual assault. Figueroa filed a lawsuit against Ferrario in In August 1991. The case was eventually dismissed in court

Ferrario's harshest critics were the conservative followers of the Archbishop Marcel Lefebvre's Priestly Society of Saint Pius X. Bishop Ferrario, through his judicial vicar, Father Joseph Bukoski, J.C.L., issued a canonical decree of excommunication to six individuals in 1991. Cardinal Joseph Ratzinger as prefect of the Congregation for the Doctrine of the Faith, later reversed Ferrario's action.

== Retirement ==
On October 12, 1993, Ferrario retired as bishop of Honolulu. After retirement, he resided near Saint Anthony of Padua Church in Kailua and continued his charitable work with the Augustine Educational Foundation. He kept a vigorous schedule to raise money for Catholic education in the Hawaiian Islands through the Augustine Educational Foundation.

== Death ==
Ferrario died of cardiac arrest on December 12, 2003, aged 77. He was buried at Hawaiian Memorial Park in Kane‘ohe, Hawaii.

In 2013, Troy Franks, a student at the St. Anthony Parish school in 1975, sued the diocese, claiming that Ferrario had sexually assaulted him starting when he was seven-years-old, for three years. Another man filed a similar lawsuit in April 2014. By 2016, five lawsuits were pending against the diocese regarding Ferrario.

Catholic Church titles
Preceded by John Joseph Scanlan	Bishop of Honolulu; 1982 – 1993	Succeeded by Francis X. DiLorenzo
