= Helio Koaʻeloa =

Apostle of Maui
- Born: ca. 1815; Maui, Hawaii, United States
- Died: 1846; Maui, Hawaii, United States

Helio Koaʻeloa (c. 1815 – 1846), was a Hawaiian Catholic lay missionary called the "Apostle of Maui" for converting about 4,000 natives to the Catholic faith. Landmarks and memorials were dedicated to him at Maui. A cross (called Hâna cross) was erected in Wailua valley in his memory in 1931.

== Biography ==
Koaʻeloa was born in 1815 on Wailua Valley, Maui, Hawaii. He was living in Hāna when he first heard about the Catholic Faith. He paddled a canoe to Honolulu to be personally instructed in the faith and to join the church. Then he returned to Maui and converted over 4,000 people for the Catholic Mission.

At the time Catholics experienced discrimination at the hands of the Protestant majority. The Catholics in Wailuku were ordered by the government to build a Protestant church but they refused. Instead, they consented to fix the roads.

His boundless enthusiasm for the promotion of the Catholic faith earned him the title "Apostle of Maui". Before the Catholic Mission was properly established in Maui, Koaʻeloa died in 1848 and was buried in Wailua, the valley of his birth.
