= James Joseph Sweeney =

American prelate

His Excellency, The Most Reverend James Joseph Sweeney
- Bishop of Honolulu
- Appointed: May 20, 1941
- In office: 1941–1968
- Predecessor: Stephen Alencastre
- Successor: John Joseph Scanlan
- Other post: Titular Bishop of Vicus Aterii

Orders
- Ordination: 24 June 1925
- Consecration: July 25, 1941 by John Joseph Mitty

Personal details
- Born: June 19, 1898 San Francisco, California, U.S.
- Died: June 20, 1968 (aged 70) San Francisco
- Buried: Holy Cross Cemetery, Colma
- Denomination: Christianity
- Motto: Ad Jesum per Mariam (To Jesus through Mary)

Styles of James Joseph Sweeney
- Reference style: His Excellency; The Most Reverend
- Spoken style: Your Excellency
- Religious style: Bishop

James Joseph Sweeney (June 19, 1898 – June 19, 1968) was an American prelate of the Catholic Church. He served as the first bishop of Honolulu in Hawaii from 1941 until his death in 1968.

== Biography ==
=== Early life ===
James Sweeney was born on June 19, 1898, in San Francisco, California, to John Joseph and Catherine (née McCarrick) Sweeney. He received his early education at St. James Boys School in San Francisco from 1907 to 1913. After deciding to become a priest, Sweeney entered Saint Patrick Seminary in Menlo Park.

=== Priesthood ===
Sweeney was ordained a priest for the Archdiocese of San Francisco on June 24, 1925, by Archbishop Edward Hanna at the Cathedral of Saint Mary of the Assumption in San Francisco.

Sweeney served as assistant pastor in the archdiocese until 1931, when he was appointed the archdiocesan director of the Society for the Propagation of the Faith. In 1929, Pope Pius XI conferred the title of monsignor on Sweeney.

=== Bishop of Honolulu ===
On May 20, 1941, Sweeney was appointed the titular bishop of Vicus Aterii and the first bishop of the newly erected Diocese of Honolulu by Pope Pius XII. He was consecrated at the Cathedral of Saint Mary of the Assumption on July 25, 1941, by Archbishop John Joseph Mitty. During World War II, Sweeney performed confirmation on 400 soldiers stationed in Hawaii. He also organized a Crusade of Prayer in which the children of the diocese prayed for the safety of an individual serviceman.

Sweeney established the Confraternity of Christian Doctrine (CCD) in the diocese to provide religious instruction to Catholic children attending public schools. In 1946, Sweeney opened the St. Stephen Seminary, a minor seminary in Kailua, Hawaii. During his tenure as bishop, Sweeney opened 21 new parishes and increased the enrollment in Catholic schools to over 22,000 students.

=== Death and legacy ===
Sweeney died on his 70th birthday on June 19, 1968, in San Francisco. His funeral liturgy was held at his home parish of Saint Paul in San Francisco. At his request, he was buried with his parents in a family crypt in Holy Cross Cemetery in Colma, California.

Catholic Church titles
Preceded by Vicar Apostolic of the Hawaiian Islands	Bishop of Honolulu; 1941–1968	Succeeded by John Joseph Scanlan
