= Hawaii Catholic Herald =

- Type: Bimonthly
- Format: newspaper and e-digital
- Owner: Diocese of Honolulu
- Publisher: Roman Catholic Bishop of Honolulu
- Founded: 1947
- Headquarters: Honolulu, Hawaii
- Circulation: 19,000
- Website: hawaiicatholicherald.com

The Hawaii Catholic Herald is the present-day version of a series of official newspapers of the Roman Catholic Diocese of Honolulu and its predecessor vicariate apostolic. Established in January 1947 to replace the publication called the Catholic Herald Newspaper (established in November 1936), it is published by the Roman Catholic Bishop of Honolulu with a readership of approximately 15,400 people across the state.

== Sources ==
- Hawaii Catholic Herald
