= John Joseph Scanlan =

American prelate

His Excellency, The Most Reverend John Joseph Scanlan
- Bishop of Honolulu
- Church: Roman Catholic
- Appointed: March 6, 1968
- In office: 1968-1981
- Predecessor: James Joseph Sweeney
- Successor: Joseph Anthony Ferrario
- Other post: Auxiliary Bishop of Honolulu

Orders
- Ordination: 22 June 1930 by John Francis Norton
- Consecration: September 21, 1954 by John Joseph Mitty

Personal details
- Born: May 24, 1906 Inniscarra, County Cork, Ireland
- Died: January 31, 1997 (aged 90) San Rafael, California, US
- Education: All Hallows College
- Motto: Regis pacis spes nostra (Our hope is the King's peace)

Styles of John Joseph Scanlan
- Reference style: His Excellency; The Most Reverend
- Spoken style: Your Excellency
- Religious style: Bishop

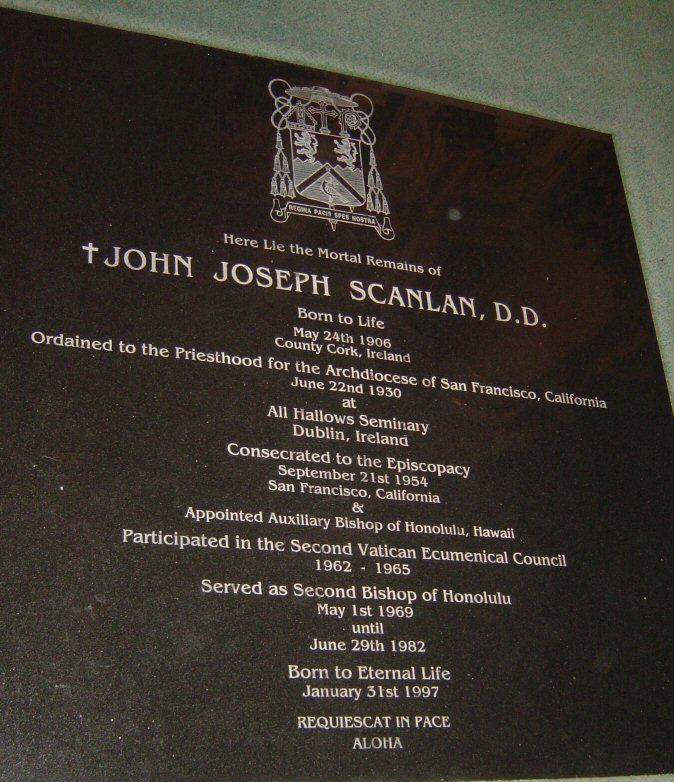
Memorial stone above the crypt of Bishop Scanlan in the sanctuary of the Cathedral of Our Lady of Peace, Honolulu

John Joseph Scanlan (May 24, 1906 – January 31, 1997) was an Irish-born American prelate of the Roman Catholic Church. He served as the second bishop of the Diocese of Honolulu in Hawaii from 1968 to 1981. He previously served as an auxiliary bishop of the same diocese from 1954 to 1968.

== Biography ==
=== Early life ===
John Scanlan was born on May 24, 1906, in Iniscarra in County Cork, Ireland. He trained at All Hallows College in Dublin.

Scanlan was ordained to the priesthood by Bishop John Francis Norton for the Archdiocese of San Francisco on June 22, 1930, in Dublin. After his ordination, Scanlan immigrated to California, where he served in pastoral positions at parishes in Oakland, Berkeley and San Jose. He directed the archdiocesan Council of Catholic Men and taught religion in high school.

=== Auxiliary Bishop and Bishop of Honolulu ===
On July 8, 1954, Pope Pius XII appointed Scanlan as an auxiliary bishop of Honolulu and titular bishop of Cenae. Scanlan was consecrated at the Cathedral of Saint Mary of the Assumption in San Francisco on September 21, 1954, by Archbishop John Joseph Mitty. On November 10, 1967, Scanlan was appointed apostolic administrator and took charge of the diocese.

On March 6, 1968, Pope Paul VI appointed Scanlan as bishop of Honolulu.

On June 30, 1981, Scanlan retired but continued to be active as bishop emeritus. John Scanlan died in San Rafael, California, on January 31, 1997.

Catholic Church titles
Preceded by James Joseph Sweeney	Bishop of Honolulu; 1968–1981	Succeeded by Joseph Anthony Ferrario
