= Diocese of Honolulu =

Latin Catholic diocese in Hawaii, United States

Coordinates: 21°18′32″N 157°49′34″W

Diocese of Honolulu Diœcesis Honoluluensis

Catholic
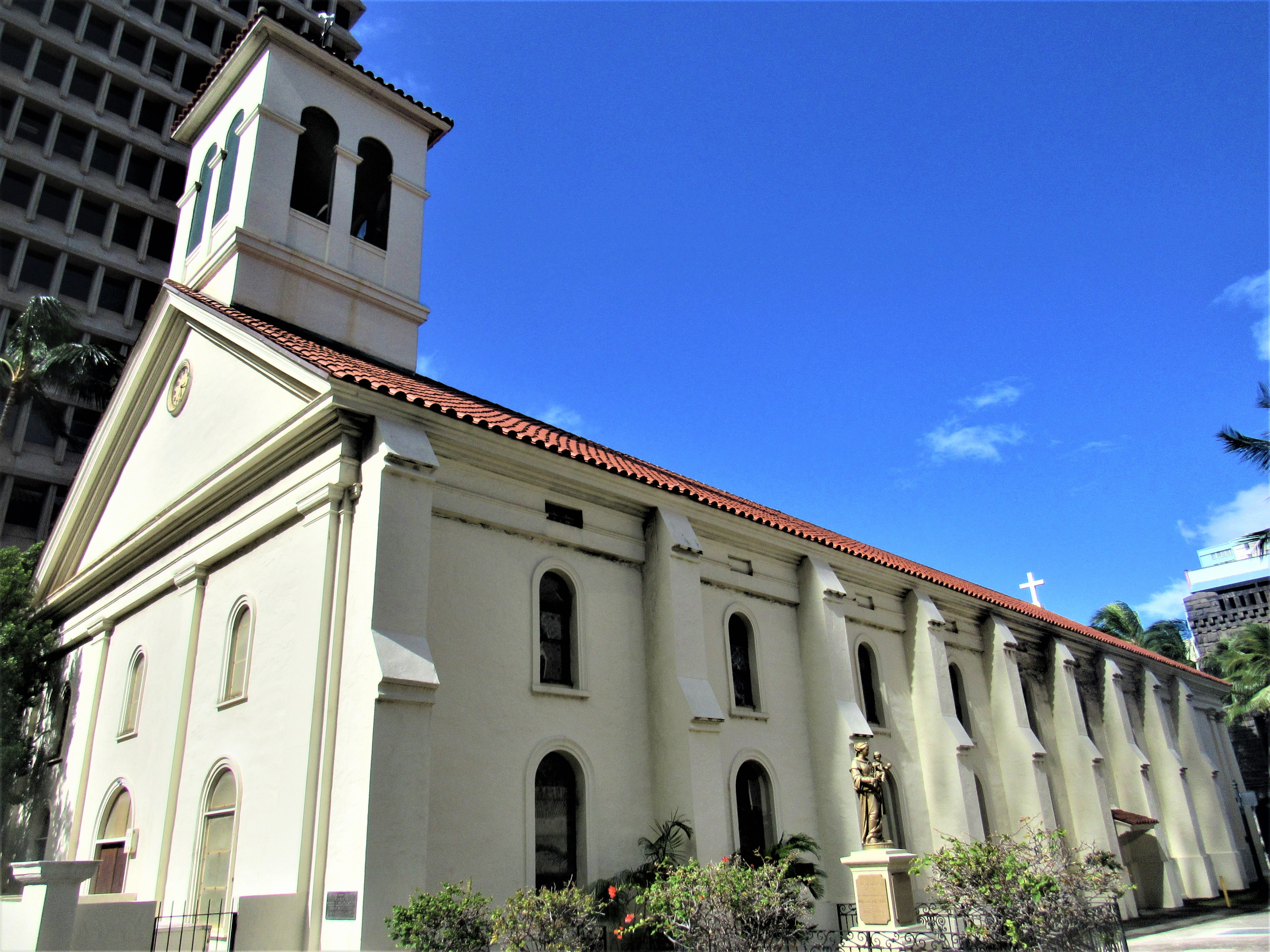
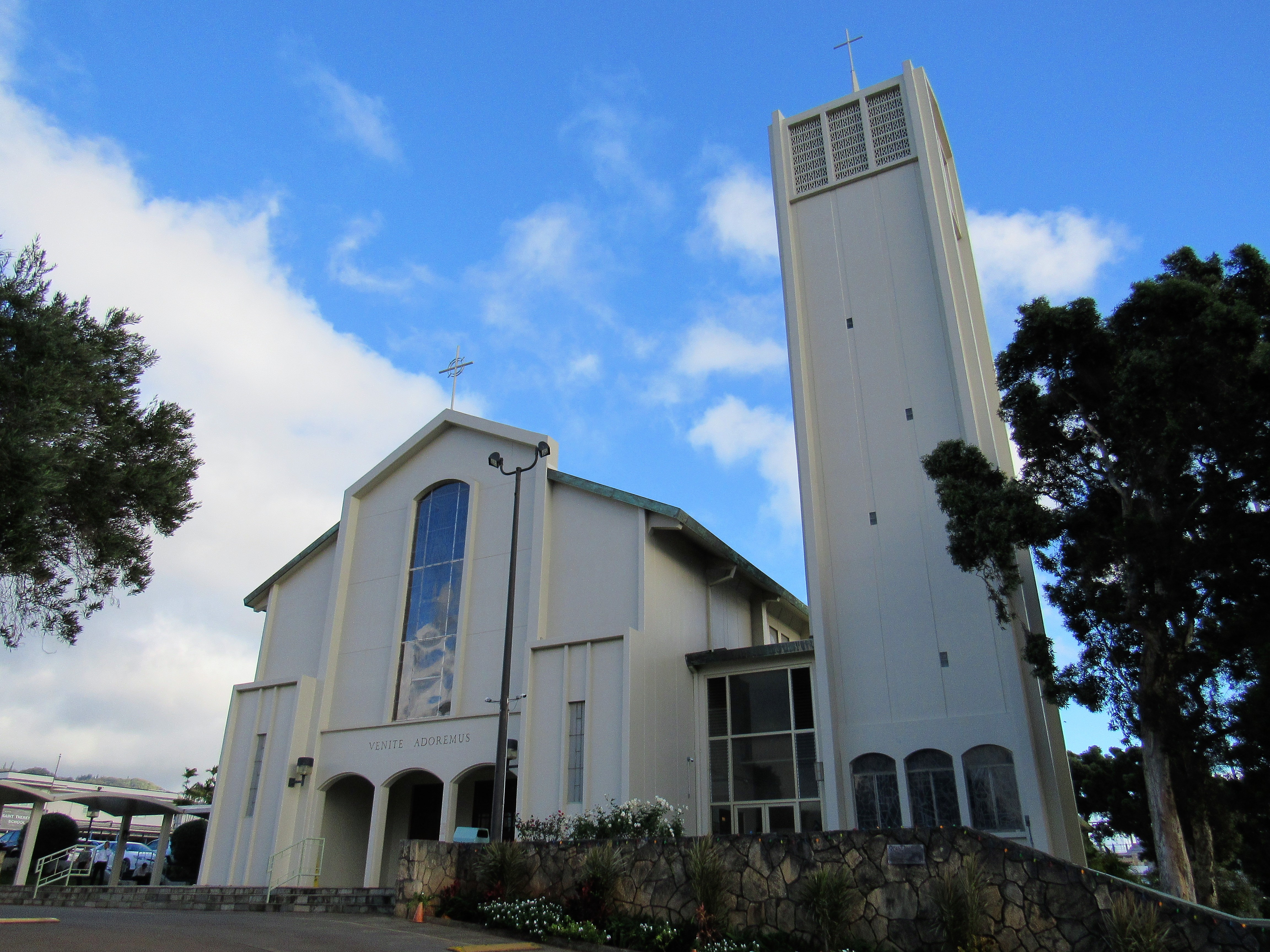
- Cathedral Basilica of Our Lady of Peace Co-Cathedral of Saint Theresa of the Child Jesus

- Coat of arms

Location
- Country: United States
- Territory: State of Hawaiʻi, Unincorporated Hawaiian Islands
- Ecclesiastical province: San Francisco

Statistics
- Area: 6,426 sq mi (16,640 km^{2}) (Note: Annuario Pontificio (2023) via Catholic-Hierarchy.org)
- Population: Total; Catholics: (as of 2023); 1,440,196; 122,652 (8.5%)
- Parishes: 66

Information
- Denomination: Catholic
- Sui iuris church: Latin Church
- Rite: Roman Rite
- Established: January 25, 1941; 85 years ago
- Cathedral: Cathedral Basilica of Our Lady of Peace
- Co-cathedral: Co-Cathedral of Saint Theresa of the Child Jesus
- Patron saint: Our Lady of Peace
- Secular priests: 78

Current leadership
- Pope: Leo XIV
- Bishop: Michael T. Castori
- Metropolitan Archbishop: Salvatore J. Cordileone
- Bishops emeritus: Clarence Richard Silva

Map
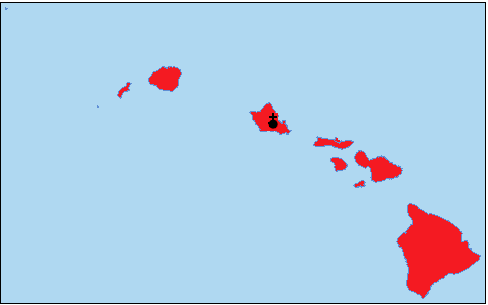

Website
- www.catholichawaii.org

The Diocese of Honolulu (Latin: Diœcesis Honoluluensis) is a Catholic diocese for the state of Hawaii in the United States. It is a suffragan diocese in the ecclesiastical province of the metropolitan Archdiocese of San Francisco. The mother church is the Cathedral Basilica of Our Lady of Peace in Honolulu. Michael T. Castori is the bishop.

== Description ==
The patron saint of the Diocese of Honolulu is the Blessed Virgin Mary, under the title of Malia O Ka Malu or Our Lady Queen of Peace. Other saints associated with the diocese include Damien De Veuster and Marianne Cope.

== History ==
=== 1825 to 1831 ===
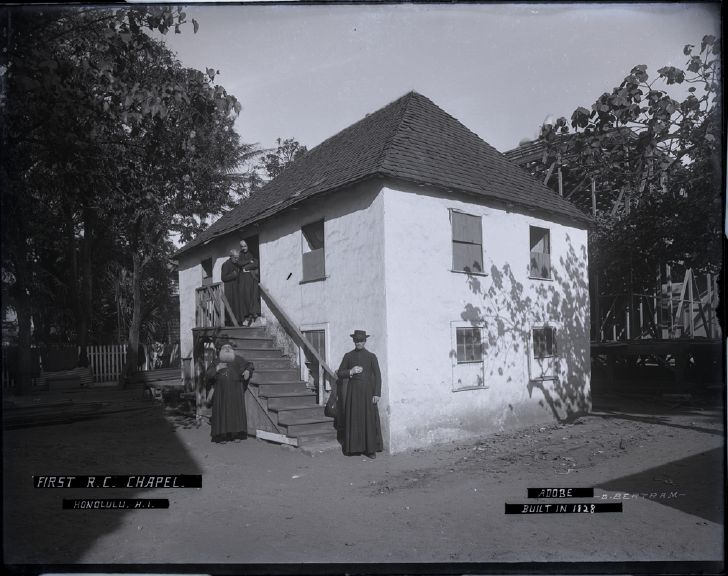
First Catholic chapel in Honolulu, Hawaii (late 1800s)

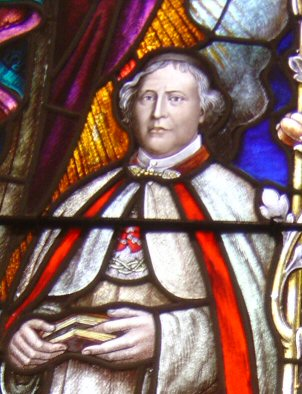
Reverend Pierre Coudrin, founder of the Picpus Order (2024)

In 1825, Pope Leo XII established the Prefecture Apostolic of the Sandwich Islands, a part of the Vicariate Apostolic of Oriental Oceania. He tasked the Picpus Order with evangelizing the Kingdom of Hawaii (then known as the Sandwich Islands). Alexis Bachelot was its prefect for a time.

Bachelot and two other Picpus priests, Abraham Armand and Patrick Short, arrived in Honolulu in the summer of 1825. However, the Hawaiian royalty had converted to Protestantism four years earlier. Under the influence of their religious advisors, Queen Kaʻahumanu initially ordered the three priests deported, but later allowed them to remain.

The priests performed the first baptism in November 1825. Bachelor and Armand did not speak English or Hawaiian, making it difficult to communicate with the Hawaiians. However, they received support from the high chief Boki, the royal governor of Oahu, and his wife Kuini Liliha.

The Picpus priests distributed Hawaiian language bibles and baptised hundreds of Native Hawaiians. The first converts included Kalanimoku, chief minister of the kingdom.

=== 1831 to 1840 ===
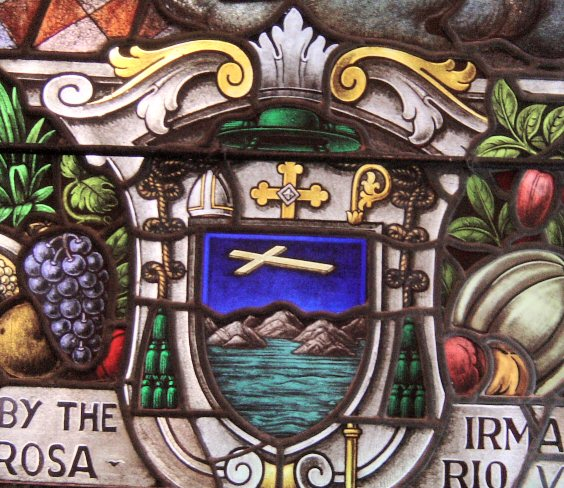
Coat of arms of Bishop Rouchouze, Cathedral Basilica of Our Lady of Peace, Honolulu, Hawaii (2004)

The American Congregationalist missionaries in Hawaii were soon alarmed at the growth of Catholicism in the islands. They influenced Kaʻahumanu to persuade King Kamehameha III to enact repressive policies against Catholics. The king expelled Bachelot and Short in 1831 and banned other priests from entering the Kingdom. After the priests' departure, many Native Hawaiian converts were imprisoned, beaten and tortured. Commodore John Downes of the United States Navy USS Potomac intervened on the converts' behalf with Kamehameha III, stopping the mistreatment.

In 1835, Vicar Apostolic Étienne Rouchouze and Bachelot dispatched Brother Columba Murphy, a Picpus religious brother, to Hawaii to evaluate the situation. Kamehameha II allowed Murphy to enter the kingdom since he was not a priest. After several months, Murphy left to report to his superiors.

In 1836, Bachelot sent Arsenius Walsh to Honolulu to continue Murphy's work. Kamehameha III initially refused Walsh's entry, but a French naval officer persuaded the king to let him stay. Kamehameha III also agreed to permit the Picpus Fathers to work freely in Hawaii so long as they only ministered to foreigners.

In April 1837, Bachelot and Short sailed into Honolulu, thinking that they were now allowed back. However, two weeks later, the Hawaiian government forced them back on their ship. The American and British consuls, with the assistance of the Royal Navy and the French Navy, forced Kamehameha III to allow Bachelot and Short to disembark. In July 1839, the French Navy frigate Artemise sailed into Honolulu Harbor.

Fearing a French assault, Kamehameha III issued the Edict of Toleration in July 1839, granting religious freedom to all Catholics in Hawaii.

=== 1840 to 1846 ===
Shortly after the Edict of Toleration was issued, Rouchouze arrived in Honolulu with three Picpus priests, including the previously exiled Louis Maigret. The priests broke ground on Our Lady of Peace in Honolulu, the first permanent church in Hawaii, in 1840. As an act of reconciliation, Kamehameha III had donated land for the church.

During the groundbreaking mass, 280 Native Hawaiian catechumens received the sacraments of baptism and confirmation. For the rest of 1840, devotees harvested large blocks of coral off the Oahu coastline to build the future Cathedral Basilica of Our Lady of Peace.

Rouchouze commissioned the construction of mission churches and schools. He imported a printing press to Honolulu to produce missals and hymnals in the Hawaiian language. Two French priests arrived in 1840 at Kailua-Kona in the Big Island to evangelize the Hawaiians. They started St. Michael the Archangel Parish, the first parish in that city.

St. Raphael's Parish was established on the Island of Kauai in 1841, the first Catholic church thereIn January 1842, Rouchouze set sail to France to recruit more Picpus priests and brothers to serve in Hawaii. However, his ship was lost at sea. In 1846, the first Catholic priest arrived on the island of Maui.That same year, Maria Lanakila Parish was erected in Lahaina.

=== 1847 to 1892 ===
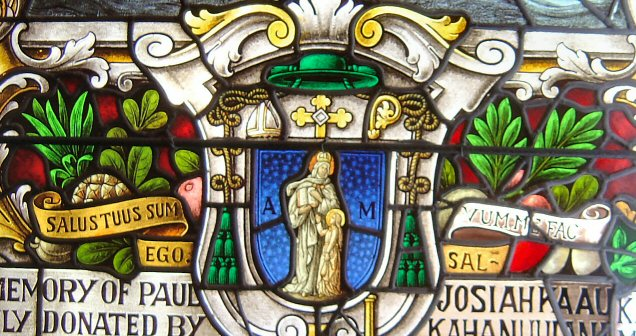
Coat of arms of Bishop Ropert, Cathedral Basilica of Our Lady of Peace (2014)

Five years after Rouchouze's disappearance, the Vatican in 1847 elevated the prefecture of the Sandwich Islands to the Vicariate Apostolic of the Sandwich Islands.Maigret was named the first vicar apostolic of the Sandwich Islands, beginning in 1847. The next year, the vicariate was renamed the Vicariate Apostolic of the Hawaiian Islands.

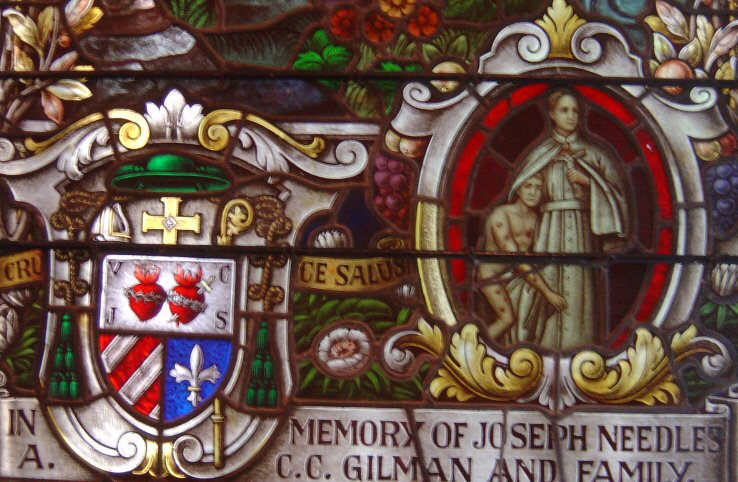
Coat of arms of Bishop Koeckemann, Cathedral Basilica of Our Lady of Peace (2004)

The first Catholic church in Hilo on the Island of Hawaii, Saint Martin of Tours, was completed in 1848. Maigret completed the construction of the Cathedral Basilica of Our Lady of Peace. He also invited the Sisters of the Sacred Hearts of Jesus and Mary and priests and religious brothers of the Society of Mary (Marianists) to open schools in the kingdom. The first permanent church on Maui, Maria Lanakila, was dedicated in 1858. Maigret died in 1882.

Bernard Koeckemann was appointed as the second vicar apostolic of the Hawaiian Islands. During his episcopate, over 16,000 Catholic Portuguese workers were brought to Hawaii to work on the sugarcane plantations. Given the simultaneous decline in the Native Hawaiian population, Koeckemann focused his evangelism efforts on the new immigrants. He made Catholic education a priority and built many schools.

Koeckemann also saw the rise of leprosy cases throughout the kingdom. Kamehameha III ordered all leprosy patients to confine themselves to the Kalaupapa Leper Colony on the island of Molokai. In 1873, Damien De Veuster went to Kalaupapa to minister to these people. Sister Marianne Cope and six sisters of St Francis arrived in Hawaii in 1883 from Syracuse, New York, to operated the leper colony. Koeckemann died in 1892.

=== 1892 to 1941 ===
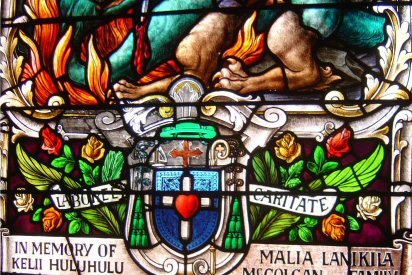
Coat of arms of Bishop Boeynaems, Cathedral Basilica of Our Lady of Peace (2004)

In 1892, Gulstan Ropert became the third vicar apostolic of the Hawaiian Islands. One year later, a group of American businessmen, aided by a contingent of United States Marines, overthrew Queen Liliʻuokalani and established a Republic of Hawaii.

Ropert provided support to the families of Hawaiian men who fought in the Spanish–American War of 1898 and the Philippine–American War of 1899 to 1902. In 1900, the Republic of Hawaii was admitted to the United States as the Territory of Hawaiʻi. Ropert died in 1903.

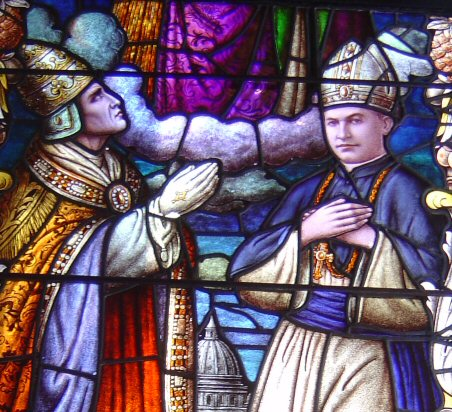
Bishop Alencastre, Cathedral Basilica of Our Lady of Peace (2004)

The next vicar apostolic of the Hawaiian Islands was Libert Boeynaems, who took office in 1903. With the establishment of Naval Station Pearl Harbor in 1900, Fort Shafter in 1907, and Schofield Barracks in 1908, Boeynaems started ministering to many Catholics in the US Armed Forces. To assist Boeynaems, Stephen Alencastre was appointed coadjutor vicar apostolic in 1924.

After Boeynaems died in 1926, Alencastre became the next vicar apostolic. He oversaw the renovation of the Cathedral Basilica of Our Lady of Peace, modernizing it in time for the centennial celebration of the Catholic Church in Hawaii in 1927. That same year, the Sisters of St. Francis opened St. Francis Hospital in Honolulu. It is today St. Francis Health Care System of Hawaii. Alencastre died in 1940.

=== 1941 to 1961 ===
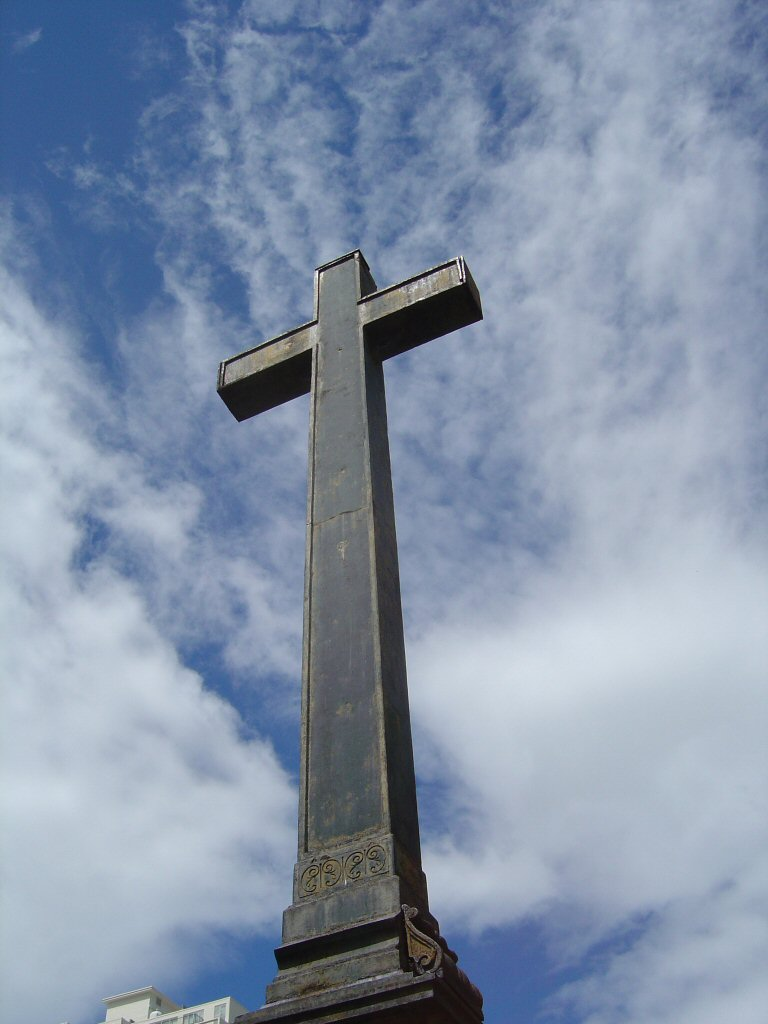
Bishops burial site, Honolulu Catholic Cemetery, Honolulu, Hawaii (2004)

Pope Pius XII in 1941 suppressed the Vicariate Apostolic of the Hawaiian Islands, replacing it with the Diocese of Honolulu. He appointed James Joseph Sweeney of San Francisco as the first bishop of Honolulu. The diocese established the Saint Stephen Diocesan Seminary in Kalihi Valley in 1946.

The Marianists established St. Louis Junior College in Honolulu in 1955. Today it is Chaminade University of Honolulu.In 1958, Our Lady of Good Counsel was erected in Pearl City, the first parish there.In 1959, Hawaii was admitted as a state.

=== 1961 to 1982 ===
Motivated by the reforms of the Second Vatican Council in the early 1960s, Sweeney renovated the Cathedral Basilica of Our Lady of Peace in keeping with the newly promulgated Constitution on the Sacred Liturgy. Soon all the parishes offered mass primarily in the vernacular in place of Latin and altars were built facing the congregation instead of the sanctuary wall. Other languages were incorporated into the mass, including the Hawaiian language. Sweeney also invited the Marist Fathers and Brothers to staff several parishes on Oahu and Kauai. Sweeney died in 1968.

In 1968, Auxiliary Bishop John Scanlan of Honolulu became the second bishop of Honolulu. Scanlan invited the Society of Jesus, the Christian Brothers of Ireland, the Religious of the Virgin Mary, and the Dominican Sisters of Iloilo to enter the diocese. The Jesuits primarily ministered to the students of the University of Hawaii at Mānoa. Scanlan retired in 1981.

=== 1982 to 2005 ===
The next bishop of Honolulu was Auxiliary Bishop Joseph Ferrario of Honolulu, who took office in 1982. His harshest critics were the conservative followers of the Archbishop Marcel Lefebvre's Society of Saint Pius X. Ferrario, through his judicial vicar, Joseph Bukoski, issued a canonical decree of excommunication to six individuals in that group in 1991. Cardinal Joseph Ratzinger, prefect of the Congregation for the Doctrine of the Faith, reversed the excommunications. Ferrario retired in 1993.

In 1994, Auxiliary Bishop Francis DiLorenzo from the Diocese of Scranton was made the fourth bishop of Honolulu. He served in Honolulu until his appointed as bishop of the Diocese of Richmond in 2004.

=== 2005 to present ===
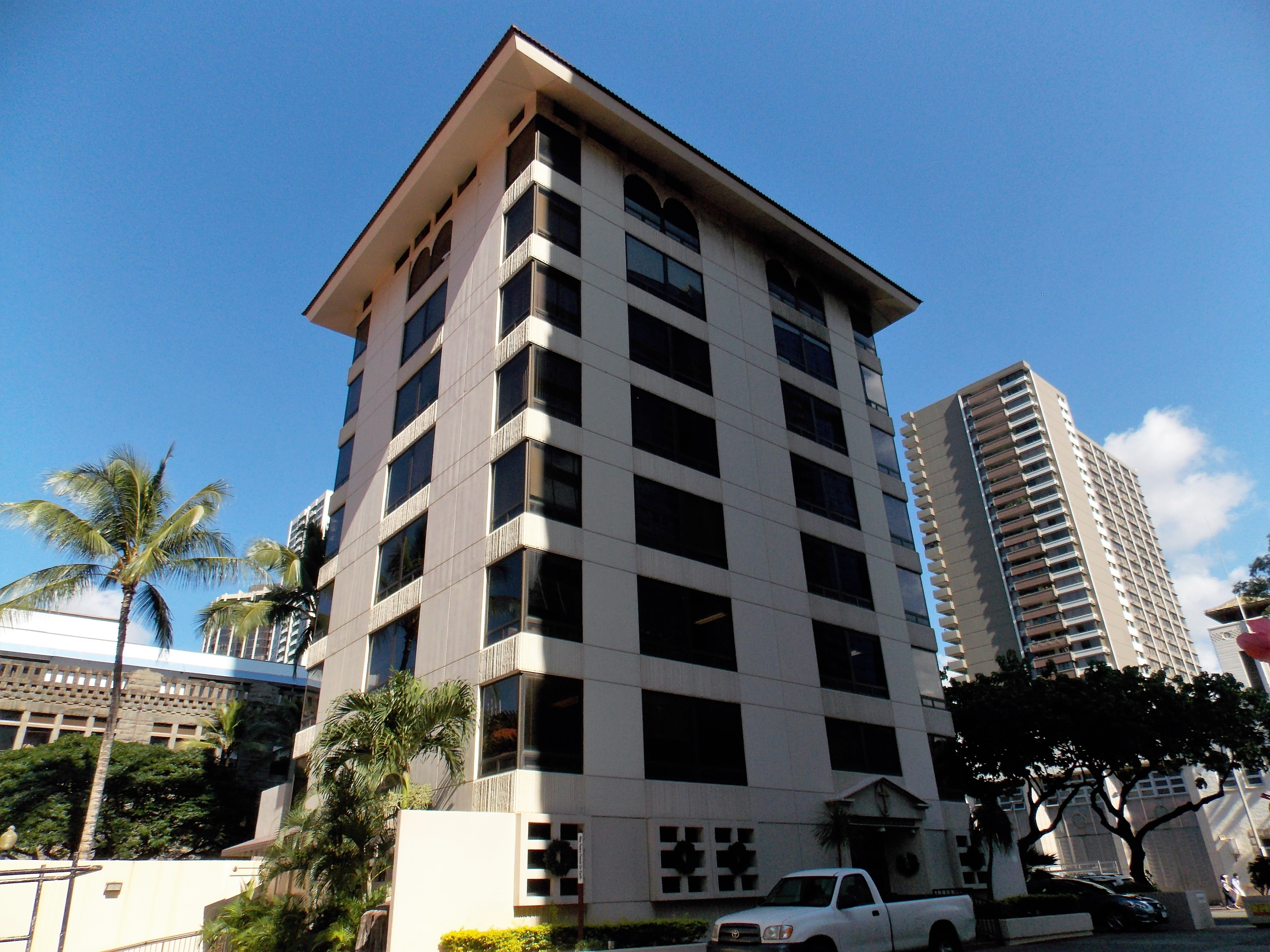
Diocesan pastoral center, Honolulu, Hawaii (2016)

Clarence Silva of San Francisco became the first native-born bishop of Honolulu to become bishop; he took office in 2005.

Silva was a principal promoter for the causes of sainthood for Damien De Veuster and Mother Marianne Cope. Silva travelled to Kalaupapa in 2005 to pay homage to them. Damien was canonized in 2009 and Cope in 2012. In April 2020, Bishop Silva announced during a Sunday mass that the diocese was paying millions to settle prior sex abuse cases and that it was still facing many lawsuits.

During the 2023 fire that devastated Lahaina on Maui, the convent, school and parish hall for Maria Lanakila Parish were destroyed. However, the church and rectory managed to escape the blaze that burned all the buildings around them.

On May 6, 2026, Pope Leo XIV accepted Silva's resignation (which he had submitted on his 75th birthday as all bishops are required to do per Canon law) and named Jesuit priest and current Seattle University Arrupe Jesuit Residence rector Michael T. Castori as the sixth and new Bishop of Honolulu.

== Bishops ==
Previous coat of arms of the Vicariate Apostolic of the Hawaiian Islands

=== Vicar Apostolic of the Sandwich Islands ===
- Louis Desire Maigret, SS.CC. (1847–1848)

=== Vicars Apostolic of the Hawaiian Islands ===
1. Louis Desire Maigret, SS.CC. (1848–1882)
2. Herman Koeckemann, SS.CC. (1882–1892)
3. Gulstan Ropert, SS.CC. (1892–1903)
4. Libert H. Boeynaems, SS.CC. (1903–1926)
5. Stephen Alencastre, SS.CC. (1926–1940)

=== Bishops of Honolulu ===
1. James Joseph Sweeney (1941–1968)
2. John Joseph Scanlan (1968–1981)
3. Joseph Anthony Ferrario (1982–1993)
4. Francis X. DiLorenzo (1994–2004), appointed Bishop of Richmond
5. Clarence Richard Silva (2005–2026)
6. Michael T. Castori (2026-present)

=== Auxiliary bishops ===
- John Joseph Scanlan (1954–1968), appointed bishop in Honolulu
- Joseph Anthony Ferrario (1978–1982), appointed bishop in Honolulu

== Notable people ==
=== Saints, Blesseds, and Servants of God ===
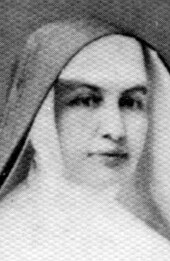
Mother Marianne Cope (pre-1918)

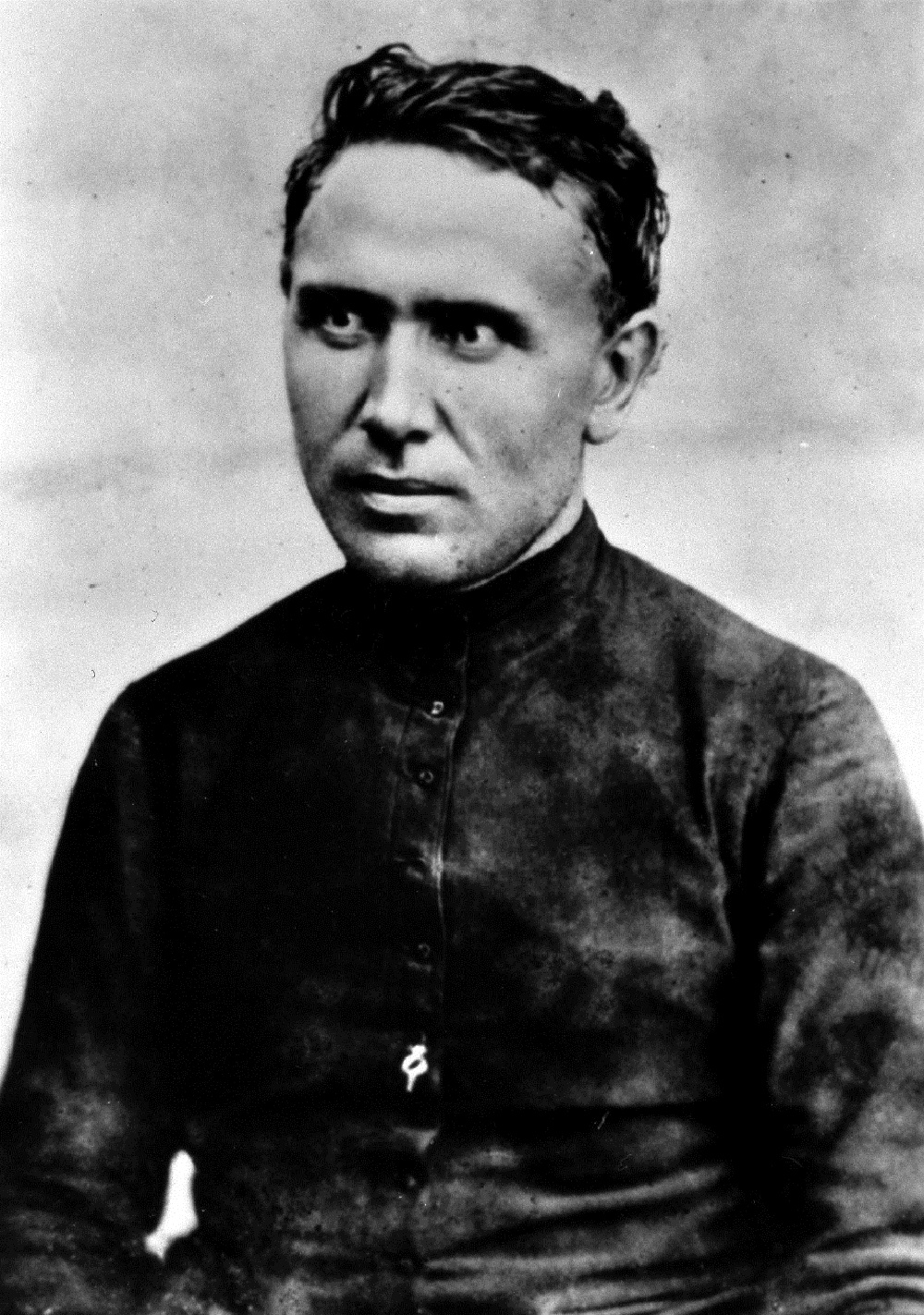
Father Damien (1878)

- St. Damien de Veuster (1840–1889), priest of the Picpus Order who established the leper colony on Molokai
- St. Marianne Cope (1838–1918), member of the Franciscan Sisters of Syracuse who worked with the lepers in Hawaii
- Joseph Dutton, Servant of God (1843–1931), lay missionary in Hawaii

=== Other notable people ===
- Fr. Alexis Bachelot, SS.CC. (1796 – 1837), Prefect Apostolic of the Sandwich Islands (1825–1837)
- Helio Koa'eloa (c. 1815 – 1846), lay missionary
- Ambrose Kanoealu'i Hutchison (c. 1856 – 1932), lay superintendent of the leper colony of Molokai
- Leopoldina Burns (Maria Leopoldina) (1855 – 1942), member of the Franciscan Sisters of Syracuse who served at the leper colony
- Aloysius Schmitt (1909 – 1944), US Navy chaplain who displayed heroism during the sinking of the USS Oklahoma during the 1941 Japanese attack on Pearl Harbor.

== High schools (selection) ==
This lists includes some of the high schools in the diocese:

- Damien Memorial School – Honolulu
- Maryknoll School – Honolulu
- Sacred Hearts Academy – Honolulu
- Saint Louis School – Honolulu
- St. Anthony High School – Wailuku (K to 12)
- St. Joseph School – Hilo (K to 12)

== Arms ==
Coat of arms of Diocese of Honolulu
Notes Arms was designed and adopted when the diocese was erected Adopted 1941 Escutcheon The arms of the diocese has a red field with a blue and white cross and two pulo‘ulo‘u (kapu staffs) Symbolism The cross represents the episcopal authority of the early missionaries in Hawaii. Red is the dominant color on the coat of arms for the State of Hawaii. Red, white and blue order represent the colors of the Hawaiian flag (and American flag). White and blue represent Mary, mother of Jesus, patroness of the diocese under the title Our Lady of Peace. The staffs represent sacredness or kapu, indicating protection or a place of refuge. The staffs come from the Seal of the Territory of Hawaii.
