= Hawaiian architecture =

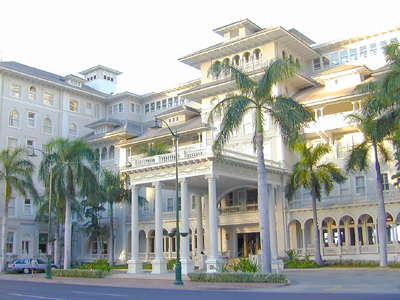
Opened in 1901, the Moana Hotel is a model for contemporary Hawaiian architectural design

Hawai`i architecture is a distinctive architectural style developed and employed primarily in the Hawaiian Islands. Though based on imported Western styles, unique Hawaiian traits make Hawaiian architecture stand alone against other styles. Hawaiian architecture reflects the history of the islands from antiquity through the kingdom era, from its territorial years to statehood and beyond.

The various styles through the history of Hawaiʻi are telling of the attitudes and the spirit of its people. Hawaiian architecture is said to tell the story of how indigenous native Hawaiians and their complex society in ancient times slowly evolved with the infusion of new styles from beyond its borders, from the early European traders, the visiting whalers and fur trappers from Canada, the missions of the New Englanders and French Catholics, the communes of the Latter-day Saints from Utah, the plantation labourer cultures from Asia to the modern international metropolis that Honolulu is today.

== History ==
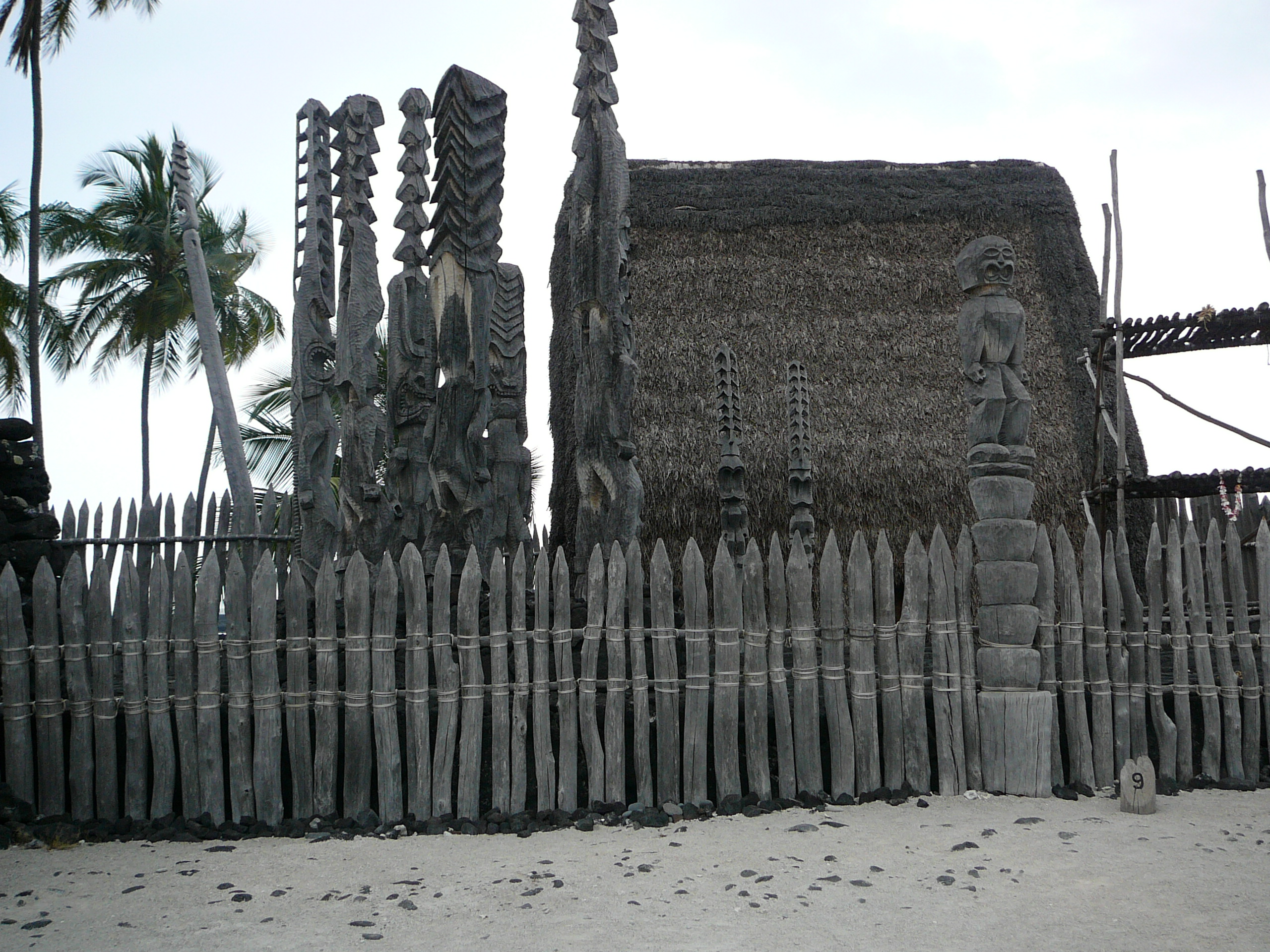
Hale O Keawe

Within the body of Hawaiian architecture are various subsets of styles; each are considered typical of particular historical periods. The earliest form of Hawaiian architecture originates from what is called ancient Hawaiʻi—designs employed in the construction of village shelters from the simple shacks of outcasts and slaves, huts for the fishermen and canoe builders along the beachfronts, the shelters of the working class makaʻainana, the elaborate and sacred heiau of kahuna and the palatial thatched homes on raised basalt foundation of the aliʻi. The way a simple grass shack was constructed in ancient Hawaiʻi was telling of who lived in a particular home. The patterns in which dried plants and lumber were fashioned together could identify caste, skill and trade, profession and wealth. Hawaiian architecture previous to the arrival of British explorer Captain James Cook used symbolism to identify religious value of the inhabitants of certain structures. Feather standards called kahili and koa adorned with kapa cloth and crossed at the entrance of certain homes called puloʻuloʻu indicated places of aliʻi (nobility caste). Kiʻi enclosed within basalt walls indicated the homes of kahuna (priestly caste).

== Hale ==
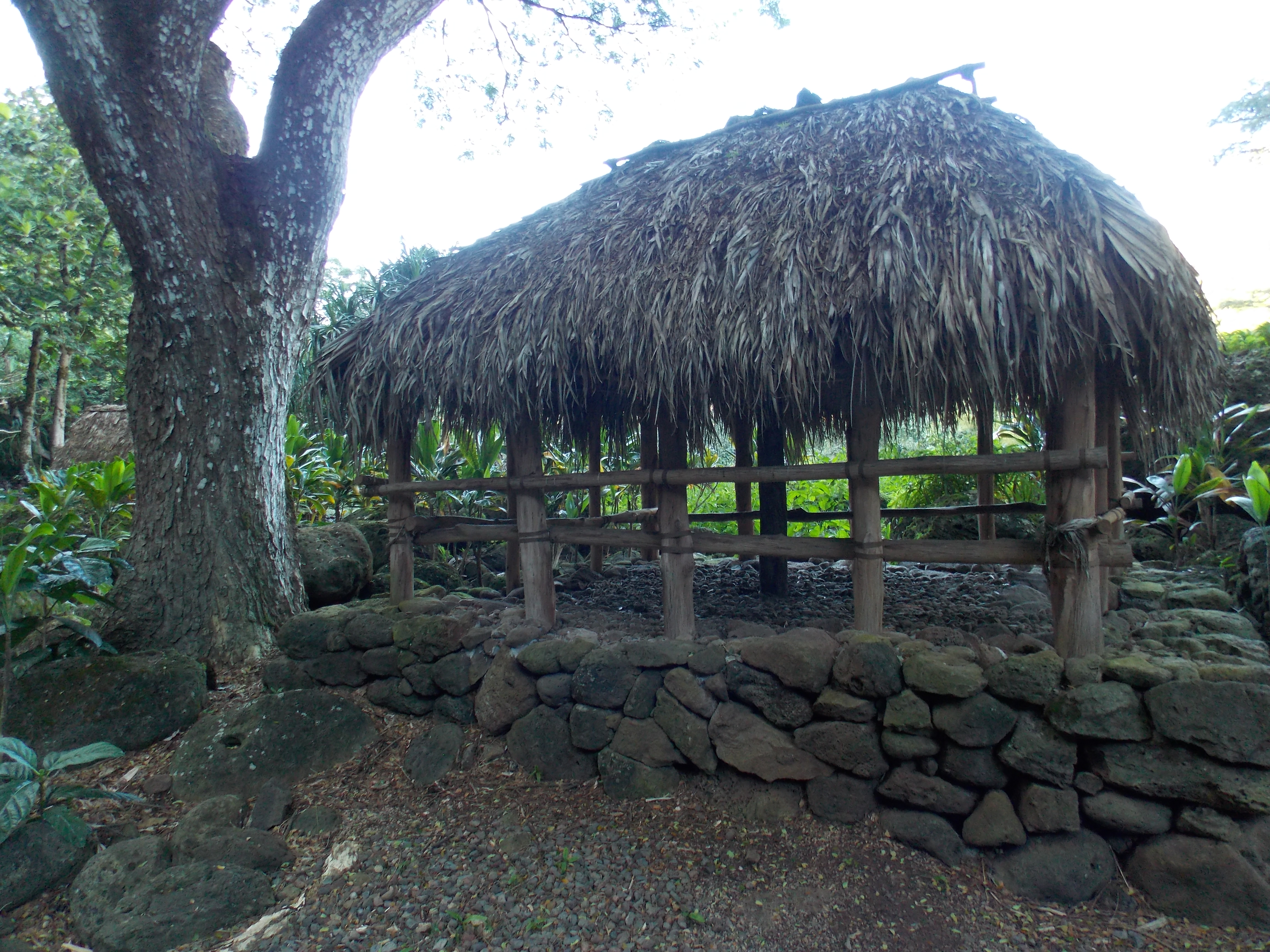

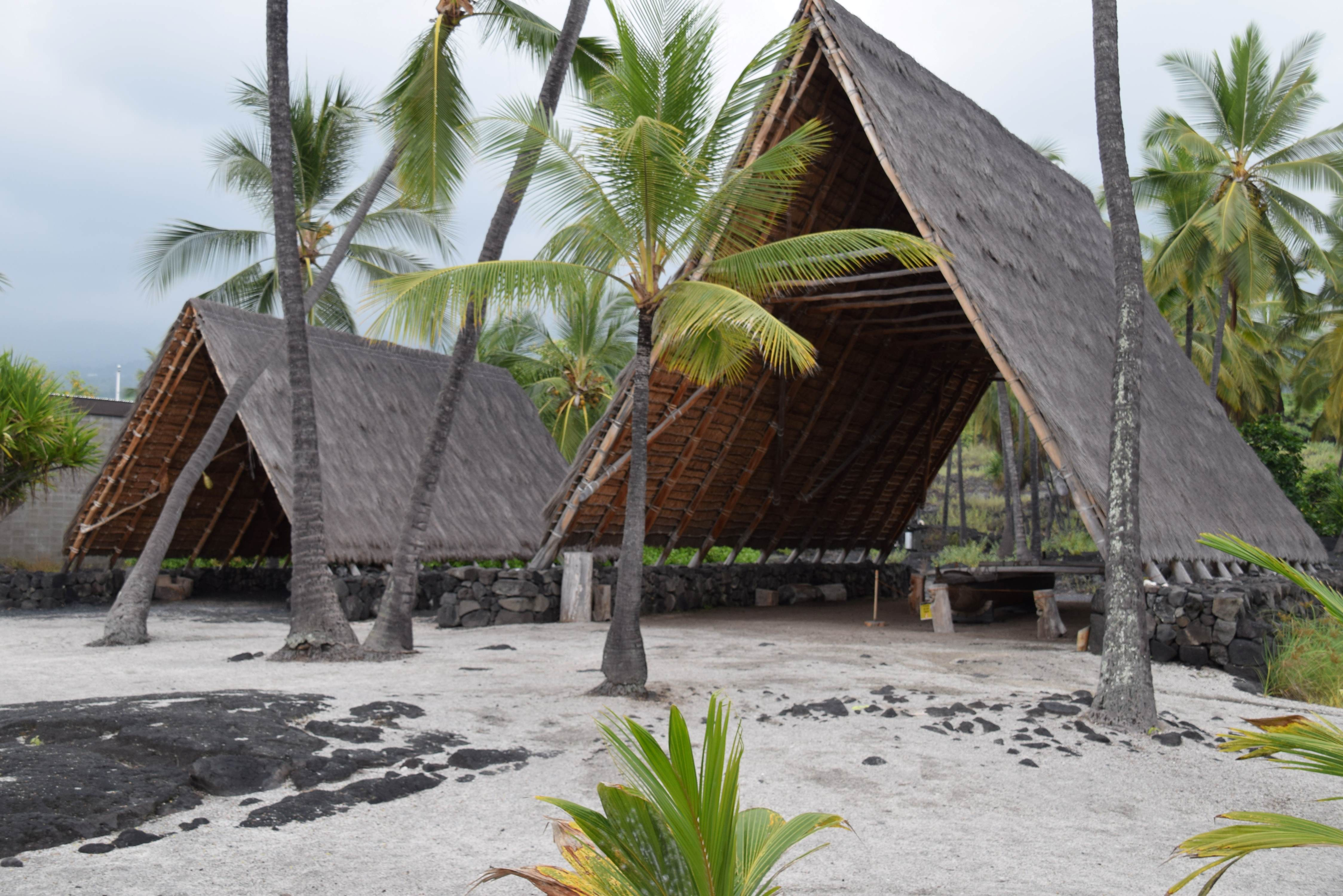
More recent larger hale in Puʻuhonua o Hōnaunau National Historical Park, the Big Island of Hawaii

A hale (Hawaiian: [həˈleː]) is a structure built using natural Hawaiian materials and designs that were prevalent during the 19th century in Hawaii. Hales are constructed using rock or wood for the lower frame and grass/leaves for roof thatching. Building codes prohibit plumbing and electrical wiring. Fire sprinklers are required if the hale is near another structure.

There are 4 classic hale styles:

- Hale Halawai - open walls
- Hale Ku`ai - lean-to
- Hale Noa - fully enclosed
- Hale Wa`a - A frame

== Mission ==
Traditional Hawaiian architecture experienced its first revolution with the arrival of Congregational missionary Hiram Bingham. Presbyterian religious families followed suit and settled in the major port towns of Honolulu and Lāhainā. Upon their arrival, they erected the first frame houses in Hawaiʻi, employing a style derived from the simple Congregational meeting-houses and farmhouse vernacular buildings of New England.

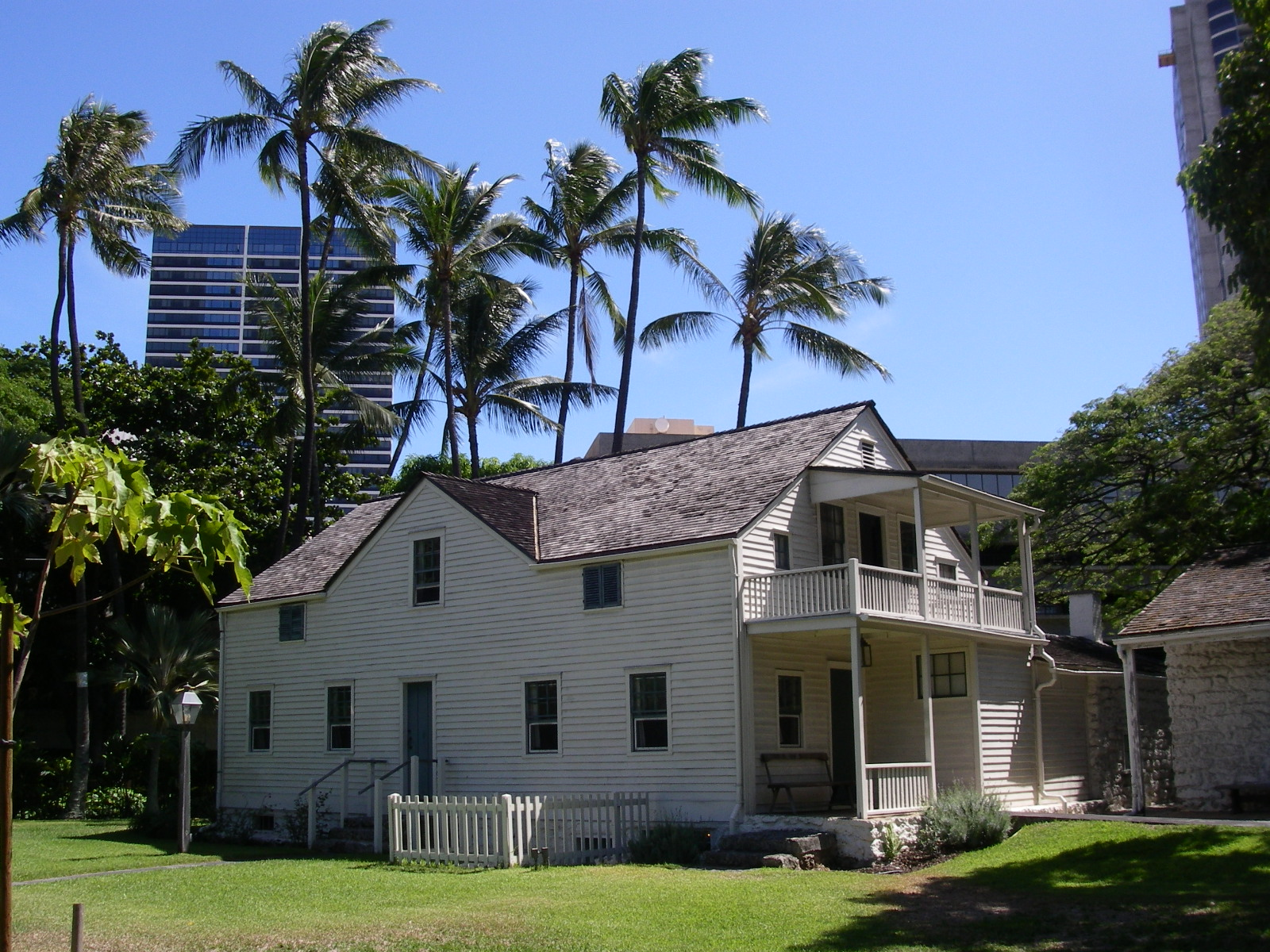
One of the houses in the mission houses museum, Honolulu.

They were simple homes with high-pitched roofs and overlapping weatherboards called clapboards. The simplicity and unassuming character of these structures were derived from the puritan ideals—that plainness was a virtue of true Christians. As the years passed, the New England style morphed into a distinctive style called Hawaiian mission architecture. New England methods and materials were replaced by methods and materials readily available to Hawaiians.

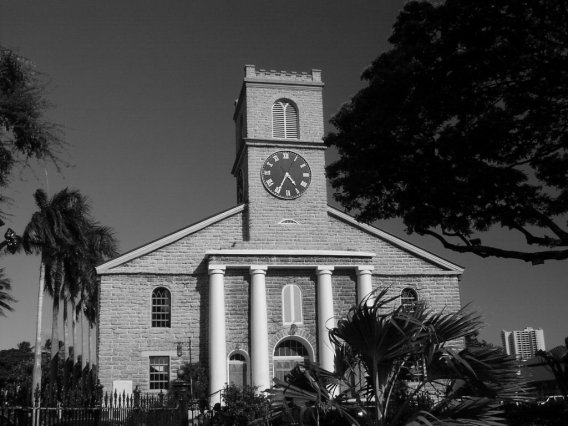
Kawaiahaʻo church.

Hawaiian mission architecture moved away from construction solely using wood and experimented with the use of coral blocks hewn from the reefs of the Hawaiian Islands. Coral seemed plentiful and were comparable to bricks used for construction in New England. When Queen Kaʻahumanu converted to the Congregational denomination of Christianity, she commissioned the construction of a major church in what is now downtown Honolulu. Kawaiahaʻo Church is one of the longest-lasting relics of Hawaiian mission architecture using coral blocks. Today, Kawaiahaʻo Church stands adjacent to the Mission Houses Museum, surviving examples of Hawaiian mission architecture using wood.

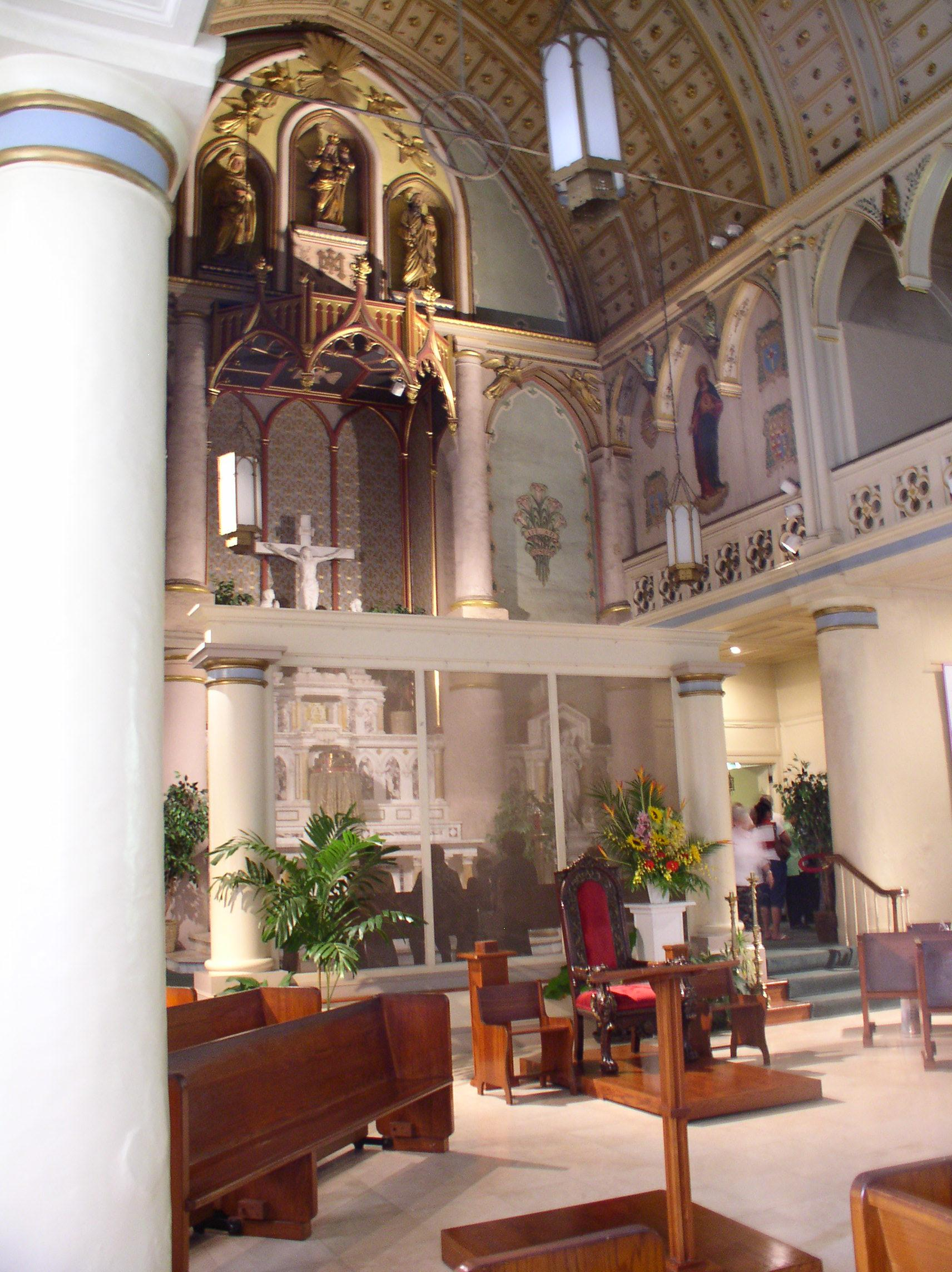
Interior of the cathedral of Our Lady of Peace

At the same time that Congregational missionaries went about the construction of Kawaiahaʻo Church, French Catholic missionaries of the Congregation of the Sacred Hearts of Jesus and Mary under the leadership of Bishop Louis Maigret introduced their own version of Hawaiian mission architecture. The difference was that their Cathedral of Our Lady of Peace project was based on simple French church architecture in the basilica form. The regional twist, like the adaptation that Congregational missionaries embraced, was the use of coral blocks from the reefs of Ala Moana and Kakaʻako. What the Picpus religious order succeeded in doing was creating the first instance of Hawaiian architecture based on continental European styles as opposed to the American puritan styles imported by the Protestants. The Picpus Fathers opened the doors to European architectural styles—classical, baroque, Renaissance, Rococo and neoclassical — that would become uniquely Hawaiian in the hands of local builders.

== Gothic ==
The first experiment of Gothic architecture in Hawaiʻi was undertaken by the Hawaiʻi Catholic Church. Discontent with the earliest designs of the Cathedral of Our Lady of Peace in 1910, Bishop Libert H. Boeynaems began an ambitious project to transform the Hawaiian mission cathedral into a unique cathedral in what was to be called Hawaiian Gothic architecture. The first phase of Boeynaemes' project was the construction of an elaborate porch over the cathedral entrance. By the time it was completed, he had exhausted his financing. Such an elaborate architectural style proved too costly. His successor, Bishop Stephen Alencastre, stripped the cathedral facade of its Gothic style and financed his own renovation project. The addition of Doric columns transformed the cathedral into a simple but elegant classical building.

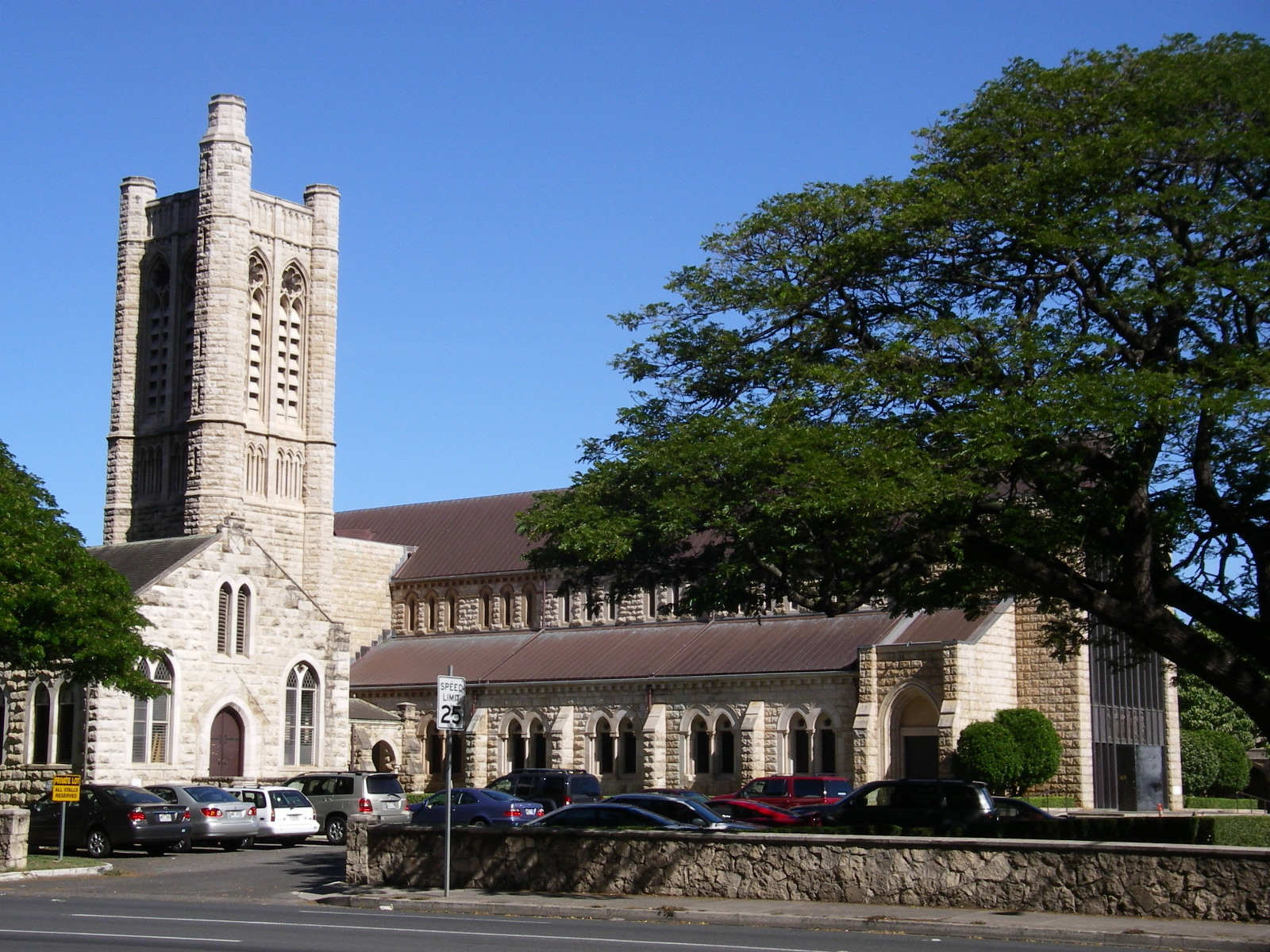
St. Andrew's Cathedral.

A more successful rendering of the Hawaiian Gothic style came as Kamehameha IV assumed the throne and established the Anglican Church of Hawaiʻi — the present-day Episcopal Diocese of Hawaiʻi. With the advice and consent of his bishop Lord Thomas Nettleship Staley, Kamehameha IV oversaw the drafting of plans for the Cathedral Church of Saint Andrew. Unfortunately, the king died and his brother Kamehameha V was left to lay the cornerstone. Completed in 1867, the Cathedral Church of Saint Andrew was the first instance of the use of vaulting in Hawaiʻi. Also, while the Cathedral of Our Lady of Peace was the first to employ stained glass, the royal cathedral installed larger panes as allowed by vaulting.

Other notable buildings constructed in the Hawaiian Gothic style are the Royal Mausoleum and the Aloha Tower. Hawaiian Gothic architecture was not as widespread for the reasons Bishop Boeynaems and Bishop Alencastre found in their experiments with the Cathedral of Our Lady of Peace. The elaborate treatments were too expensive and were deemed unsuitable against the backdrop of the Hawaiian environment. People believed that any Gothic building in Hawaiʻi would look out of place.

== Renaissance ==
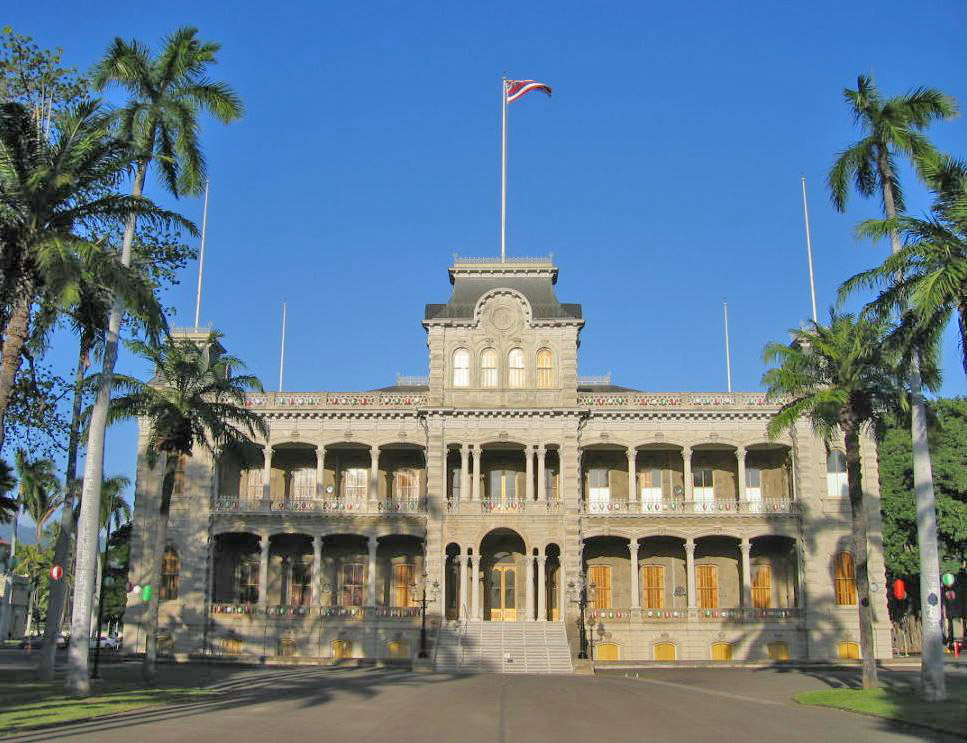
ʻIolani Palace.

While Kamehameha IV succeeded in developing the Hawaiian Gothic style, Kamehameha V fathered Hawaiian Renaissance architecture. Commissioned in 1850, the last king of the House of Kamehameha originally planned Aliʻiōlani Hale to be his royal palace inspired by the sleek beauty of historic Italian structures. In the middle of its construction, the building was changed to become the kingdom's government center. Renaissance comes from the French word for rebirth. Hawaiian renaissance was therefore a rebirth of traditional Roman architectural principles of aesthetics but also included concepts derived from Hawaiiana. Elegant facades had petite columns and wide verandas and walls that seemed to crinkle. Curves and ornamentation were important.

When Kalākaua became king, he shared in his predecessor's delight with Hawaiian renaissance architecture. He also shared in Kamehameha V's dream of building a world-class royal palace befitting of a modern monarchy such as that of Hawaiʻi to rival the famed palaces of Europe. ʻIolani Palace was finished in 1882 and did fulfill Kalākaua's expectations. Considered the finest example of Hawaiian renaissance architecture, ʻIolani Palace became a world-famous royal landmark. This building has been categorized as the only example of American Florentine architecture anywhere in the world. (Note: The term "Florentine architecture" has been applied elsewhere, whether or not describing exactly the same style as here. The term Renaissance Revival is a general term which includes "Florentine" influence; some works termed that might qualify as "Florentine", depending on how that is defined. The Woodbury Branch Library, built in 1913 in Denver, Colorado, was described at the time of its construction "as Florentine in style", per a 1986 National Register of Historic Places study of the Denver parks and parkways system.)

In addition to his contributions to the development of Hawaiian renaissance architecture, Kalākaua experimented with various other styles. One of his other famous building projects is the completion of ʻIolani Barracks. Constructed adjacent to ʻIolani Palace and across the street from Aliʻiōlani Hale, ʻIolani Barracks housed the royal guards. It resembles a medieval castle with crenelated parapets and towers.

== Romanesque ==
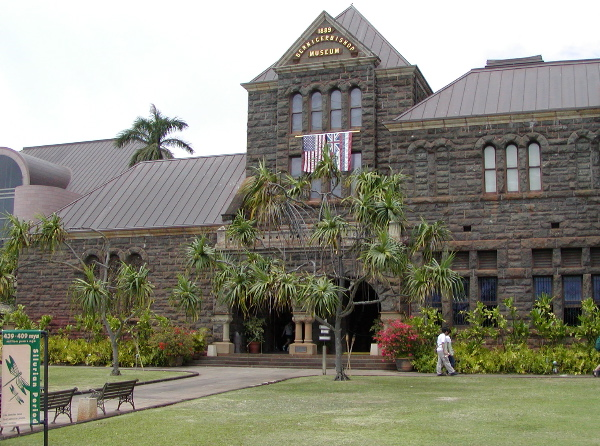
Bishop Museum entrance.

In the last years of the Hawaiian monarchy and early years of the territorial period, Hawaiian Romanesque architecture came into popular use. The style hearkened back to the European designs of the 11th and 12th centuries. Hawaiian Romanesque employed principles and forms used by Romans in later periods of the ancient empire. The difference was that Hawaiian builders used dark basalt boulders giving the appearance of a uniquely Hawaiian style. Such buildings typically used rounded arches, barrel vaults and groin vaults and cruciform piers for support. The various buildings of the Bernice P. Bishop Museum are in the Hawaiian Romanesque style.

== Beaux-Arts and Art Deco ==
In the 1920s and 1930s, Beaux-Arts and Art Deco came to be known in Hawaiʻi. Developed in France in the late 19th century, Beaux-Arts is a form of neoclassicism that combines ancient Greek and Roman architectural styles and principles into a modern form. Likewise, Art Deco is considered to be a blanket modernization of all architectural styles. Hawaiian builders created Hawaiian Beaux-Arts and Art Deco architecture by incorporating Hawaiian motifs and tropical treatments to the various parts of their projects. An example of Hawaiian Beaux-Arts is the Waikiki Natatorium War Memorial in Waikīkī. The most famous examples of Hawaiian Art Deco are the Hawaiʻi Theatre and the Schofield Barracks Historic District.

== International ==
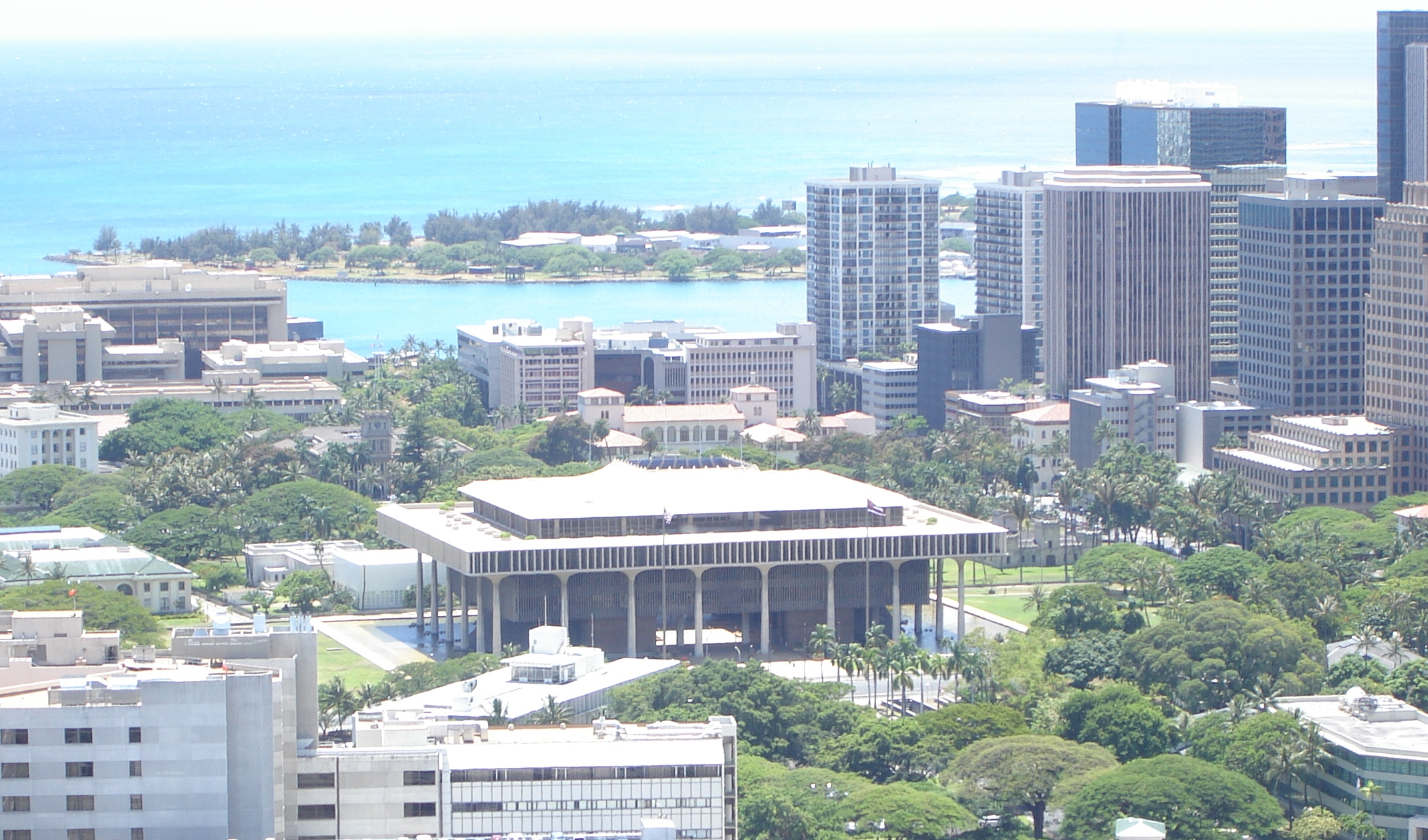
The Hawaiʻi State Capitol. Photo taken from Punchbowl.

The Hawaiʻi State Capitol is the centerpiece of Honolulu's collection of buildings in the Hawaiian international style of architecture. Developed in the 1920s and popularized in the 1960s, Bauhaus architecture became a widespread trend throughout the world. An American form of Bauhaus architecture called the international style was accepted in Hawaiʻi and became a trend especially for downtown Honolulu office buildings. Bauhaus employed classical principles in their most simplified forms without the use of heavy ornamentation. Characteristic of Bauhaus were dull colors like white, gray, beige and black and embraced open floor plans.

Bauhaus became an inspiration for Hawaiʻi Governor John A. Burns in his plans to construct a new capitol building for his state. The Hawaiʻi State Capitol was true to the traditions of Bauhaus in its use of clean lines, simple geometric shapes, pervasive use of black and the gray of concrete and the openness of the entire structure. But like all other architectural imports to Hawaiʻi, Bauhaus was transformed into a uniquely Hawaiian style with the addition of several treatments.

Hawaiian international architecture used precious indigenous koa wood for doors and furnishings and designs employed symbolism of natural Hawaiian phenomena. The capitol dome, for example, is designed to reflect the volcanic origins of the Hawaiian Islands. Beneath the dome is a mosaic by Tadashi Sato representing the frequently changing colors of the Hawaiian coastal waters. Tied into the ocean theme, the capitol is surrounded by water just as the Hawaiian Islands are surrounded. The main space of the capitol building is open to the environment with entrances facing the sea and the mountain, respectively. Architects: Belt, Lemmon & Low (Architects Hawaii Ltd.) and John Carl Warnecke

== Plantation ==
At the same time that the monarchy and various corporations developed Downtown Honolulu with their renditions of Hawaiian Renaissance styles, residential homes were being built in the outskirts of the city and elsewhere in the state. The style became known as Hawaiian plantation architecture featuring low profile wood frames, vertical plank siding and large porticos. Roofs were the most distinguishable parts of Hawaiian plantation structures as they were wide-hipped or bellcast and had eaves that were deep bracketed. When viewed against the natural Hawaiian environment, Hawaiian plantation structures look as though they blend easily with their surroundings. The style gets its name from the sugarcane and pineapple plantations, which employed the design for labourer homesteads.

By the 1970s and 1980s, the Hawaiian plantation style was headed toward extinction with the importation of popular trends from California and other western states. But a movement began in the late 1990s that revived the Hawaiian plantation style in a contemporary manner. The wide-hipped or bell-cast roofs were adapted for use in large-scale construction projects like the renovation of Ala Moana Center, Victoria Ward Centers and the building of new towers at the Hawaiian Village Hotel. The style gained new popularity and were employed in new commercial and residential developments in West Oahu especially in the new city of Kapolei. Hawaiian plantation architecture became a signature style for Hawaiʻi and is the most recognizable Hawaiian style being exported to other parts of the globe.

== Skyscrapers ==
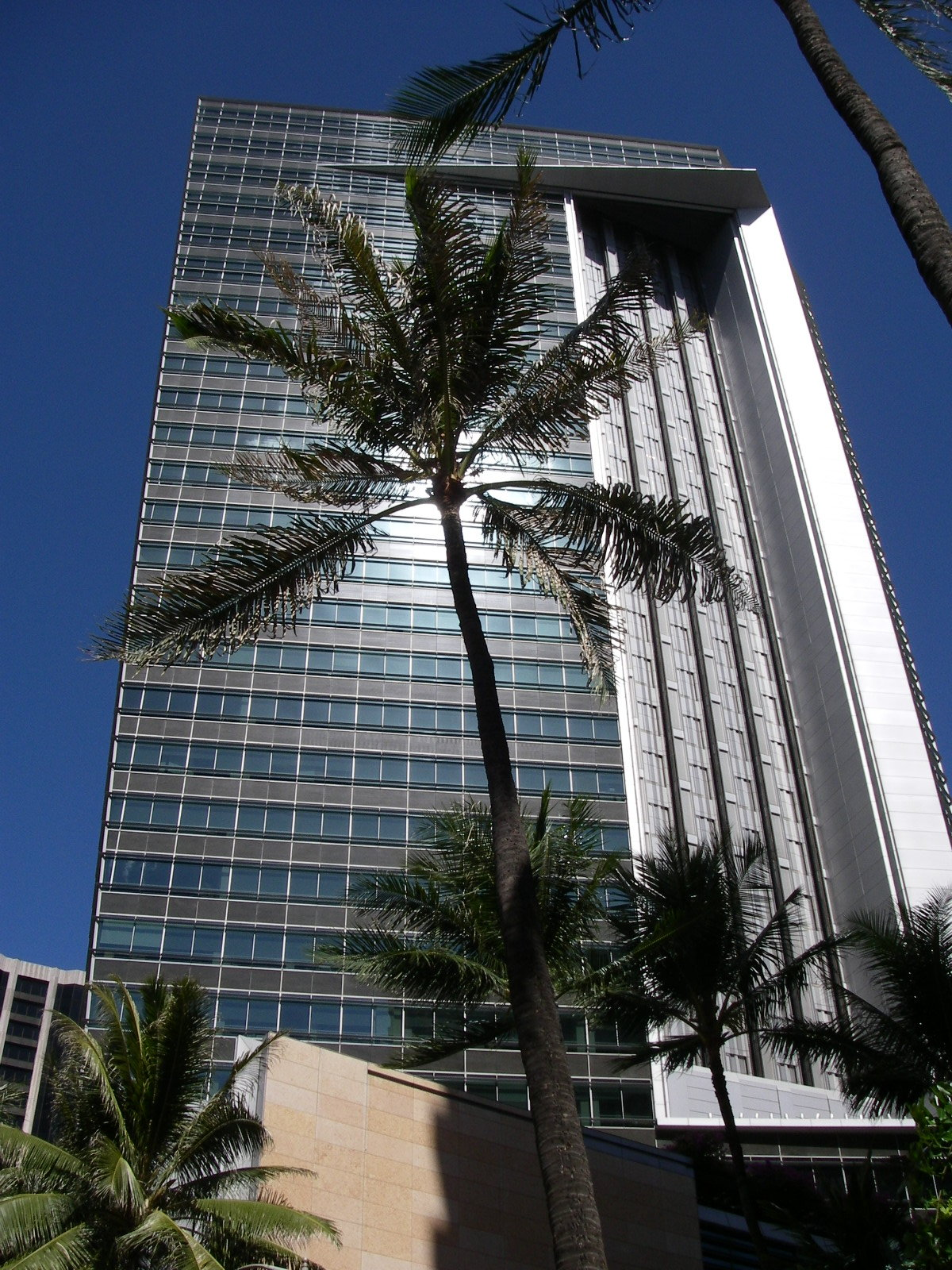
First Hawaiian Center

Only recently did Hawaiʻi develop a skyscraper skyline with such projects as the First Hawaiian Tower at 1132 Bishop Street and the First Hawaiian Center at 999 Bishop Street, both in downtown Honolulu. Even skyscrapers in Hawaiʻi could not be constructed without the addition of metaphors and symbolism tied to Hawaiʻi's natural phenomena. For example, the First Hawaiian Center completed in 1996 employed horizontally louvered windows that framed views of the sea while vertically proportioned windows faced the mountains. A great deal of effort was made to incorporate as much natural light into the building interiors.

Perhaps Norman Lacayo was the most influential architect of the late-20th century in downtown Honolulu. He was the architect for the iconic building, Harbor Court, the anchor of the redevelopment of the downtown waterfront. Harbor Court is a multi-use building with restaurants in the lower floors and a split residential/office tower. No other building in Honolulu captures the romantic spirit of Hawaiʻi. The stepping of the residential tower and the articulation of the office wing create a dynamic similar to the steep volcanic mountain range that borders the city. Although many of his residential towers are distributed throughout Honolulu, most are located along the Nuʻuanu corridor.

== Evolving residential architecture ==
Charles William Dickey from as early as 1899 expressed the concern that an architecture suitable for Hawaiʻi's environment be developed and it is this sensitivity for which his architecture is best remembered. He strove in his turn-of-the-20th-century residential work to design houses in which "the culture of the people has asserted itself." He stressed the need for broad lānais, interior courtyards and fountains, and felt that the "California Mission" style of architecture "is certainly most appropriate for Hawaiʻi."

Continuing in the evolution of modern Hawaiian Architecture, a great number of contemporary architects have interpreted a "modern" version of Hawaiian Architecture Styles and Sensibilities.

== See also ==
- Indigenous architecture
- Architecture of Samoa
- Wharenui
