= Gulstan Ropert =

French bishop

The Most Reverend Gulstan Francis Ropert SS.CC.
- Vicar Apostolic of Hawaiian Islands
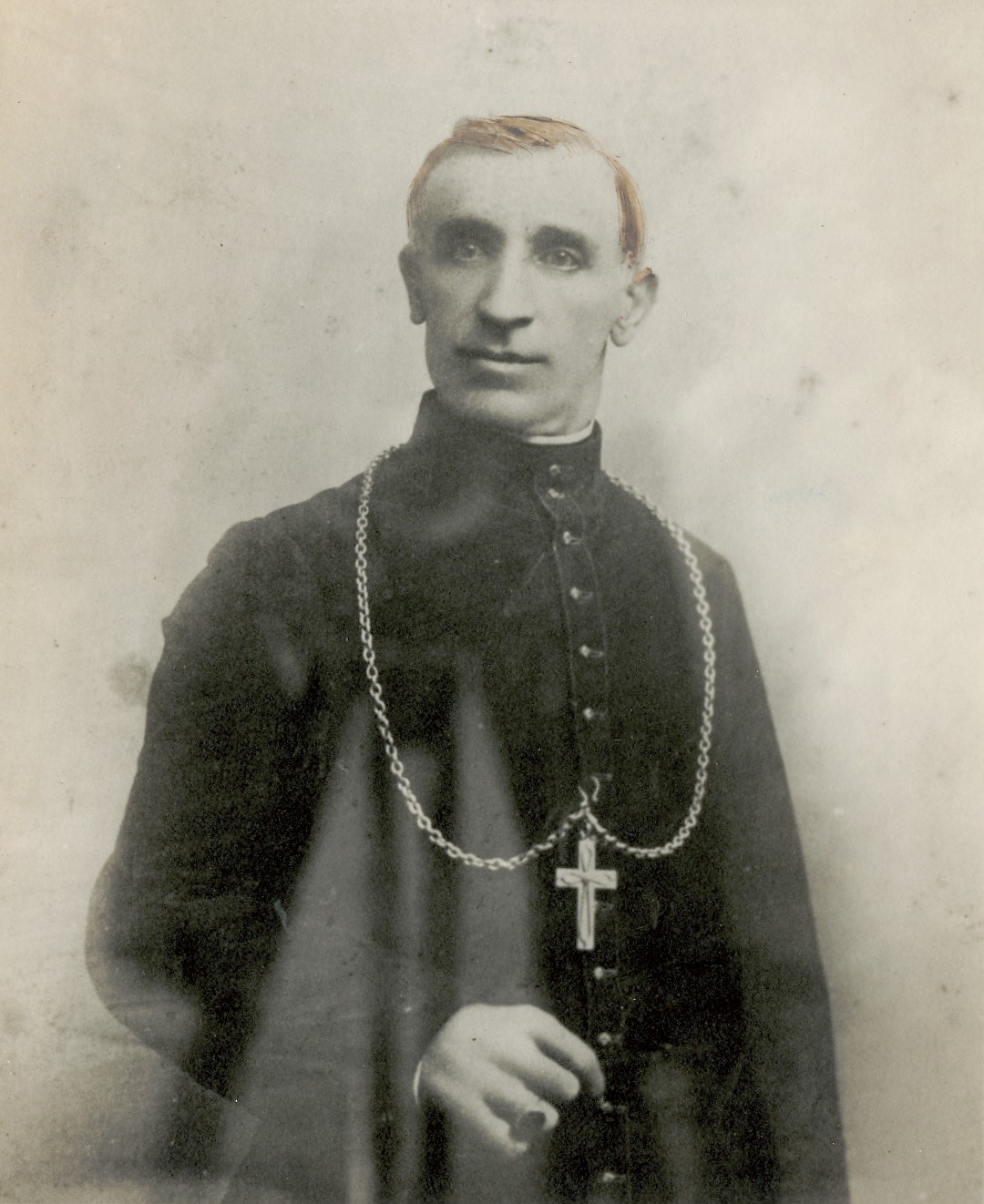
- Church: Roman Catholic
- See: Titular Bishop of Panopolis
- Appointed: 3 June 1892
- In office: 1892-1903
- Predecessor: Herman Koeckemann
- Successor: Libert H. Boeynaems

Orders
- Ordination: 26 May 1866
- Consecration: 25 September 1892 by Patrick William Riordan
- Rank: Bishop

Personal details
- Born: August 30, 1839 Kerfago, Brittany, France
- Died: January 14, 1903 (aged 63)
- Buried: Honolulu Catholic Cemetery
- Coat of arms

Gulstan Ropert, SS.CC., (August 30, 1839 - January 4, 1903) of the Congregation of the Sacred Hearts of Jesus and Mary served as the third vicar apostolic of the Apostolic Vicariate of the Hawaiian Islands - now the Roman Catholic Diocese of Honolulu, from 1892 to 1903.

== Early life ==
Born in France at Kerfago, St. Gildas de Rhuys, Morbihan, in Brittany, he was baptized as François. François Ropert entered the Congregation of the Sacred Hearts of Jesus and Mary at age 20 and took the name Gulstan. He was ordained to the priesthood on May 26, 1866, at the age of 26.

He was sent to the Kingdom of Hawai‘i to assist the Vicariate, arriving in Honolulu on June 9, 1868. In 1873, he was one of three priests to volunteer to serve in Molokai; the others were Boniface Shäffer, Rupert Lauter, and Damien De Veuster, the last of whom was selected.

Ropert was in charge of the Hamakua district on the island of Hawai‘i until October 2, 1883, when he was assigned to the Wailuku mission. He left Wailuku for Honolulu in 1891 having been appointed Vice-Provincial.

== Elevation to the episcopate ==
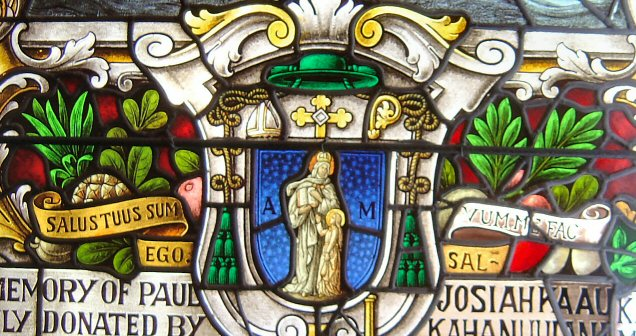
Episcopal arms of Msgr. Ropert, Cathedral of Our Lady of Peace, Honolulu.

After Msgr. Koeckemann's death on February 22, 1892, Father Ropert earnestly begged his superiors not to be nominated as Vicar Apostolic. Superior General Father Bosquet ignored Father Ropert's request and appointed him as Provincial on April 22, 1892, and recommended that he be a candidate for the office of Vicar Apostolic left vacant by the death of Msgr. Koeckemann. Having received the bull of his nomination to lead the Hawaiian Islands on June 3, 1892, Father Ropert embarked for San Francisco where he was consecrated in Saint Mary's Cathedral as a bishop of the titular see of Panopolis on September 25 at the age of 53 by Archbishop Patrick William Riordan, assisted by Bishop Lawrence Scanlan of Salt Lake City and Bishop Francisco Mora y Borrell of Monterey-Los Angeles. Msgr. Ropert adopted an episcopal coat of arms of azure, containing a Saint Anna of Auray, accompanied by the letters A.M. (standing for Ave Maria) in silver with his motto being Tuus sum ego, salvum me fac (from Psalm 118: 94, meaning, I am yours, save me). During his episcopate, Msgr. Ropert witnessed the overthrow of the Hawaiian Kingdom in 1893 and the continuing migration of workers for the Hawaiian sugar industry. He built a new residence for the clergy in Honolulu, a wooden two-story building, flanked on all sides, except the rear, by a veranda. Subsequently. the old adobe house was torn down and on its site was placed a statue of Nôtre Dame de la Paix (Our Lady of Peace), which he blessed on December 24, 1893, the sixty-second anniversary of the first expulsion from the Hawaiian Islands of the first prefect apostolic, Msgr. Alexis Bachelot.

== Secret societies and establishment of Catholic Young Men's Institute ==
Msgr. Ropert's peace-loving nature made him hesitate in enforcing in his vicariate the condemnation by the Holy Office of the secret societies of the Odd Fellows, the Knights of Pythias, and the Sons of Temperance on June 24, 1894. The documents of the Holy See were addressed to the Catholic Bishops of the United States and his wish not to disturb the Catholics of his jurisdiction who were members of the condemned organizations inclined him to the opinion (confirmed by Archbishop Riordan of San Francisco) that the proscription was limited to the United States. On the advice of the Superior General of the Picpus Fathers, Msgr. Ropert later published the Roman decree and extended the Holy See's condemnation of the secret societies to include the Hawaiian Islands. To better counteract membership in these societies, Msgr. Ropert supported the establishment of three councils of the Young Men's Institute.

== Brother Infirmarians at the Kalaupapa Settlement ==
Prior to his first ad limina visit to Rome in 1895, Msgr. Ropert appointed Father Cornelius Limburg as his pro-Vicar. He then left for France in the company of Father Hubert Stappers and a Portuguese youth, Peter Alencastre (later Bishop Stephen Alencastre) who was to begin his studies for the priesthood at Louvain in Belgium. During his voyage, Msgr. Ropert showed his devotion to the priests of his jurisdiction by paying a visit to each one's family - which caused him to journey through France, Germany, Belgium and the Netherlands. He returned to Honolulu on November 16, 1895, accompanied by Father Pamphile deVeuster, the brother of the late Father Damien, one choir brother and four lay brothers, all destined for the Kalaupapa Settlement. According to arrangements made with the Board of Health, the brothers were given the care of the Bishop's Home for Boys in Kalaupapa. Father Pamphile followed in his brother's footsteps, but being an elderly, scholarly man at the time of his arrival, he could not get accustomed to the surroundings and returned to Belgium on August 25, 1897.

== Catholic education in the vicariate ==
Msgr. Ropert's continuing concern for Catholic education of his flock led him to erect a girls' school in Hilo entrusted to the Franciscan sisters; in Honolulu he also established a free school for boys (St. Francis School) in connection with St. Louis College (September 1893). He also provided a new concrete schoolhouse for the Sisters of the Sacred Hearts (1901). During Msgr. Ropert's episcopate, the Treaty of Paris in 1898 effectively ended the Spanish–American War, with the loss of the Philippines, Guam and Puerto Rico to the United States. This seminal event would lay the groundwork for the migration of workers for the sugar industry in Hawai‘i from the vestiges of the Spanish empire in the predominantly Roman Catholic Philippines, Puerto Rico and Guam.

== Father Wendelin Moeller and the Board of Health ==
On December 4, 1901, Pilipo Mikila and Kalani, left the Kalaupapa Hansen's Disease Settlement in violation of the regulations of the Board of Health. The local police captain, believing that they had been stealing sheep, arrested them on their return to Kalaupapa and put them in jail. Kalani made a confession and was put in a light airy cell. Mikila denied guilt and as a punishment, was put in a cell with no outside window, comparatively dark and poorly ventilated. Until March 12, 1902, he was not arraigned on any charge and no written accusation was made against him. He was in an advanced state of Hansen's disease when arrested and grew even worse during his detainment. On the aforementioned date, he was taken home by the members of a society to which he belonged. He died six days later. He had no proper care before leaving the jail, and no medical attention. Complaints were made about this heartless and illegal treatment to the attorney-general and after an investigation, C. W. Reynolds, the superintendent of the settlement, and Dr. Oliver, the local physician were discharged for official neglect. It was a surprise to the public that at the same meeting of the Board of Health where these actions were taken, it was similarly resolved that "the harmony and interests of the leper settlement would be promoted by the removal of Father Wendelin Moeller (the priest in charge of Kalaupapa since Father Damien's death) and that the Right Reverend Gulstan, Bishop of Panopolis, be requested to remove him forthwith and appoint some other priest to fill the vacancy made thereby." Msgr. Ropert subsequently informed the Board he would comply with their resolution when formal written charges against Father Wendelin had been served and proven. The Board refused to file charges, but informed the Msgr. Ropert that Father Wendelin's permit to remain at the settlement would be revoked as of June 10, 1902. It was later disclosed that Superintendent Reynolds had filed complaints with the Board accusing Father Wendelin of interfering with his management; Father Wendelin admitted having preached, not against the Board of Health, but against the shameful immorality of concubinage and adultery at the settlement, and the performance of public work to be done on Sunday without any urgent necessity. After considerable public outrage at the actions of the Board of Health by the Home Rule Party, the various Catholic societies, the Portuguese societies, the Protestant Ministerial Union, the Board of Health resolved "out of respect for the Bishop and in appreciation of the charitable objects of the Catholic mission at the settlement, this request (by Msgr. Ropert to retain Father Wendelin in view of his long and faithful services at the Kalaupapa Settlement) be granted on the distinct understanding that Father Wendelin attend strictly to his clerical duties in the future..." Father Wendelin, appreciative of Msgr. Ropert's efforts opined that he could not "strictly adhere to his clerical duties" without preaching against immorality and the breaking of the Sabbath, and requested that Msgr. Ropert relieve him of his charge. On September 23, 1902, Msgr. Ropert granted Father Wendelin's request and replaced him with Father Maximin André, head of the Hilo mission.

== Final years ==
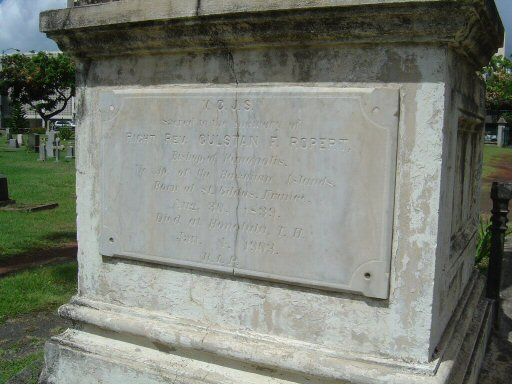
Grave stone of Msgr. Ropert at the Honolulu Catholic Cemetery

Msgr. Ropert engaged in extensive pastoral visitation notwithstanding the pain caused by a stomach cancer he endured since September 1898. In summer of 1902, he made a trip to San Francisco and lower California partly for business and partly for the benefit of his declining health. He returned, no better, and succumbed to his illness on January 4, 1903. He was buried in the Honolulu Catholic Cemetery at 839A South King Street, in downtown Honolulu.

Catholic Church titles
Preceded by Herman Koeckemann	Vicar Apostolic of the Hawaiian Islands; 1892–1903	Succeeded by Libert H. Boeynaems
