= André-Hubert Fournet =

French Roman Catholic saint

Saint André-Hubert Fournet
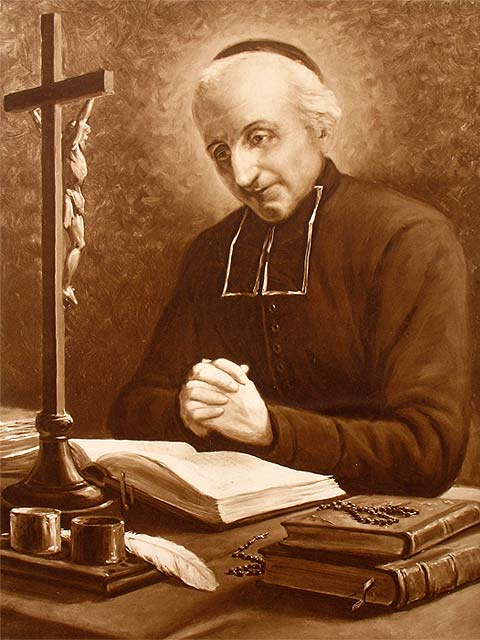
- Born: 6 December 1752; Saint-Pierre-de-Maillé, Vienne, Kingdom of France
- Died: 13 May 1834 (aged 81); La Puye, Vienne, French Kingdom
- Venerated in: Roman Catholic Church
- Beatified: 16 May 1926, Saint Peter's Basilica by Pope Pius XI
- Canonized: 4 June 1933, Saint Peter's Basilica by Pope Pius XI
- Feast: 13 May
- Attributes: Book of the Hours, crucifix

André-Hubert Fournet (6 December 1752 – 13 May 1834) was a French Roman Catholic priest and together with Jeanne-Elisabeth Bichier des Ages the founder of the Daughters of the Holy Cross, Sisters of St. Andrew. Fournet had a disdain for religion in his childhood but became a priest due to the shining example and influence of an uncle of his. He later fled France in 1792 following a brief arrest during the French Revolution after refusing to take the oath, and returned sometime later where he met Bichier. Pope Pius XI beatified him in 1926 and canonized him a short while after in 1933.

== Life ==
André-Hubert Fournet was born on 6 December 1752 in Vienne to Pierre Fournet and Florence Chasseloup. He had at least one sister and his cousin was Julien Augustin Chasseloup de Chatillon (1760-1800). His uncle Antoine Fournet baptized him in the local parish church on 7 December.

Fournet found most things bored him and religion in his childhood was one such thing he deemed to be a bore. This disdain for religion continued to grow because his mother kept nagging him to become a priest and he often said of it: "I'm still not going to be a priest or monk". Fournet went through legal and philosophical studies at Poitiers but ran off from school as a sign of rebellion towards his mother and even joined the armed forces; his mother found him and pulled him out of it. He did not want to get a job and his poor handwriting limited the scope of job hunting. His uncle Jean Fournet – a rural pastor – had such an influence on him that he decided to become a priest, and was ordained in 1776. He was made the parish priest of his own hometown (succeeding his uncle) in 1781, to the pleasure of his mother.

The French Revolution saw him refuse to take the oath and he continued his now illegal pastoral mission in secret. On 6 April 1792 – on Good Friday – he was arrested for his activities. He declined being taken to jail in a carriage and said since Jesus Christ carried His cross it behooved His followers to travel on foot. He would escape and at one point assumed the place of a dead person on a bier. Fournet then fled to Spain in 1792 and later returned in 1797.

He made the acquaintance of Jeanne-Elisabeth Bichier des Ages in 1798 and collaborated with her in the establishment of her new religious order named the Sisters of the Cross. He drew up the monastic rule that the new congregation would follow. He is said to have – in what was seen as a miracle – multiplied food for the members of the new congregation and their charges a number of times. He retired from his parish duties in 1820 but continued to direct the new order until his death in mid-1834. From 1820 until his death he lived with his sister.

== Sainthood ==
The sainthood process opened on 19 July 1877 under Pope Pius IX and the priest was titled as a Servant of God as a subsequent result, while local investigations – an informative and apostolic process – were held in Poitiers. The confirmation of his life of heroic virtue allowed for Pope Benedict XV to title him as Venerable on 10 July 1921.

Pope Pius XI confirmed two miracles to him and beatified him on 16 May 1926 while the confirmation of an additional two allowed for the same pope to canonize Fournet as a saint on 4 June 1933.

== Sources ==
- Attwater, Donald and Catherine Rachel John. The Penguin Dictionary of Saints. 3rd edition. New York: Penguin Books, 1993. ISBN 0-14-051312-4.
