= Louis-Désiré Maigret =

French bishop

The Most Reverend Louis-Désiré Maigret SS.CC.
- Vicar Apostolic of Sandwich Islands
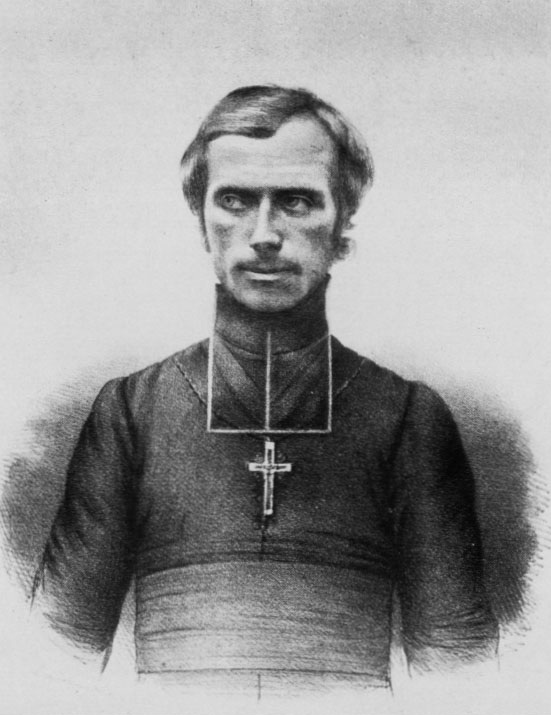
- Church: Roman Catholic
- See: Titular Bishop of Arad
- Appointed: 11 September 1846
- In office: 1846-1882
- Predecessor: Etienne Jerome Rouchouze
- Successor: Herman Koeckemann

Orders
- Ordination: 23 September 1828
- Consecration: 31 October 1847 by José Hilarión Etrura Cevallos
- Rank: Bishop

Personal details
- Born: September 14, 1804 Saint-Pierre-de-Maillé, France
- Died: June 11, 1882 (aged 77)
- Coat of arms

Louis-Désiré Maigret, SS.CC. (September 14, 1804 – June 11, 1882), served as the first vicar apostolic of the Vicariate Apostolic of the Sandwich Islands, now the Roman Catholic Diocese of Honolulu. Born in Saint-Pierre-de-Maillé, France, Maigret was ordained to the priesthood as a member of the Congregation of the Sacred Hearts of Jesus and Mary on September 23, 1828, at the age of 24. As part of his missionary work, Father Maigret sailed to the Kingdom of Hawaiʻi to help build its Catholic community of native Hawaiians.

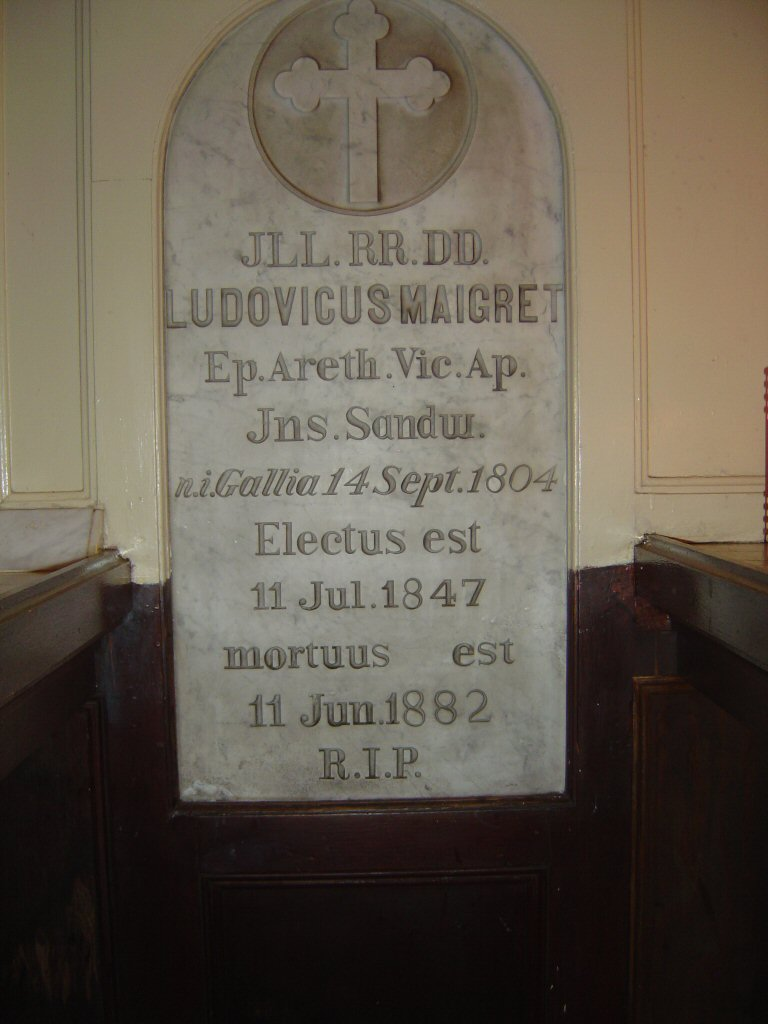
Memorial stone at Maigret's burial crypt in the Cathedral of Our Lady of Peace, Honolulu.

The diocese sent him as a missionary to Pohnpei, now in Micronesia, in December 1837 on the schooner Notre Dame de Paix. He was the first missionary ever seen there. In his company were "several Mangarevans and Tahitians," some of whom remained on Pohnpei and left descendants. He departed on 29 July 1838 for Valparaíso after seven unsuccessful months.

When the Vicar Apostolic of Oriental Oceania, Msgr. Étienne Rouchouze, SS.CC., was lost at sea on board the ill-fated Marie Joseph in early 1843, the Holy See appointed Father Maigret as the first vicar apostolic of the Sandwich Islands on September 11, 1846, at the age of 42. He was officially ordained as a bishop of the titular see of Arathia (Arad) on November 28, 1847, at the age of 43. Bishop Maigret oversaw the construction of what would become his most lasting legacy, the Cathedral Basilica of Our Lady of Peace.

Maigret ordained Father Damien de Veuster in Honolulu cathedral in May 1864. He supported Damien in his work with lepers.

After his death, Maigret was entombed in the crypt below the sanctuary.

Catholic Church titles
Preceded by Vicar Apostolic of Oriental Oceania; Étienne Jérôme Rouchouze	Vicar Apostolic of the Sandwich Islands and in 1848, Vicar Apostolic of the Hawaiian Islands; 1847–1882	Succeeded by Herman Koeckemann
