= Herman Koeckemann =

German bishop

The Most Reverend Bernard Hermann Koeckemann SS.CC.
- Vicar Apostolic of Hawaiian Islands
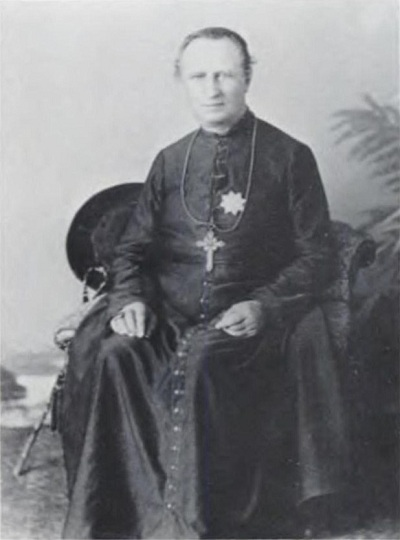
- Church: Roman Catholic
- See: Titular Bishop of Olba
- In office: 1882-1892
- Predecessor: Louis Maigret
- Successor: Gulstan Ropert

Orders
- Ordination: 31 May 1862
- Consecration: 21 August 1881 by Joseph Sadoc Alemany
- Rank: Bishop

Personal details
- Born: January 10, 1828 Ostbevern, Germany
- Died: February 22, 1892 (aged 64)
- Buried: Honolulu Catholic Cemetery
- Coat of arms: Bernard Hermann Koeckemann's coat of arms

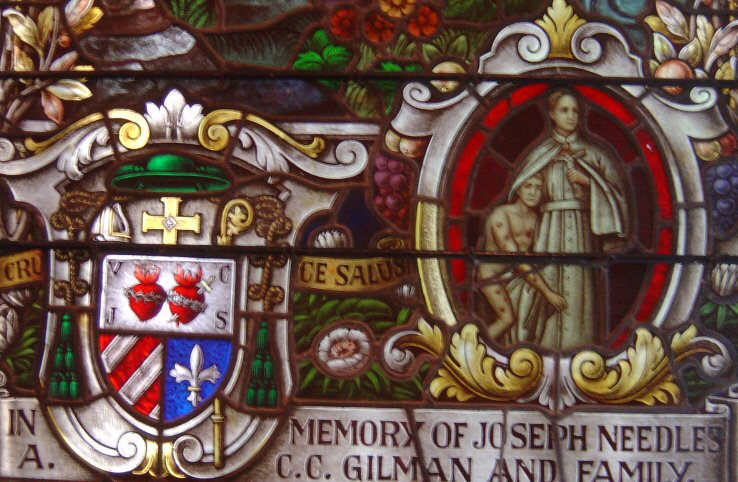
Episcopal arms of Msgr. Koeckemann, and inset of Father Damien de Veuster in a window at Cathedral of Our Lady of Peace, Honolulu.

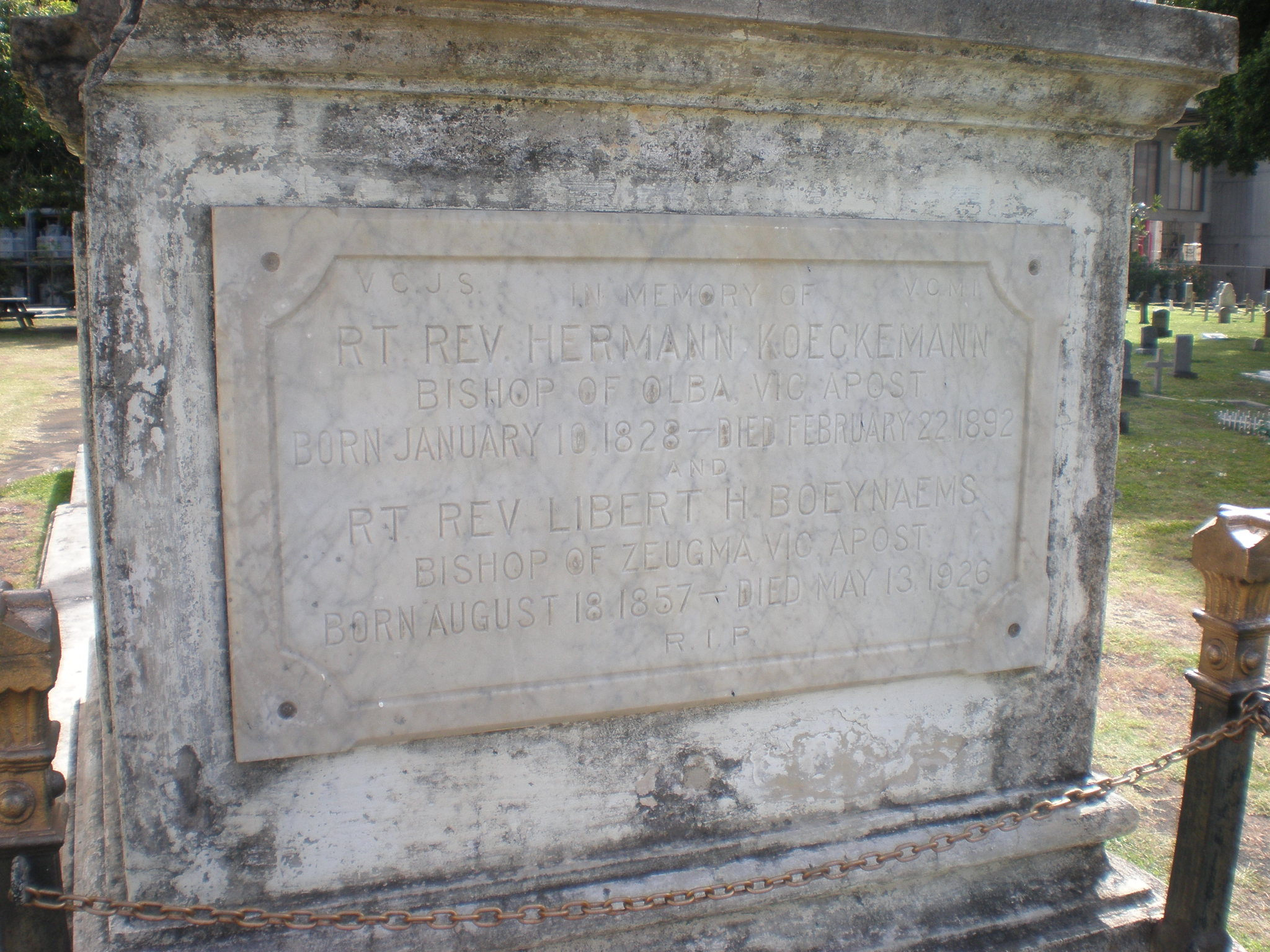
Tombstone for Bishops Koeckemann and Boeynaems at the Honolulu Catholic Cemetery

Herman Koeckemann, formally Bernard Hermann Koeckemann, SS.CC., (January 10, 1828 – February 22, 1892), served as the second vicar apostolic of the Vicariate Apostolic of the Sandwich Islands — now the Roman Catholic Diocese of Honolulu — from 1881 to 1892.

== Biography ==
Born in Ostbevern, Westphalia, Germany, he was baptized as Bernard. At the age of 14, his father, a farmer, sent him to the Gymnasium of Münster. Koeckemann was an excellent student and excelled in classical studies. During his seven years of college, his progress in Latin, Greek, Hebrew and French and in philosophy and science was so well marked that at the graduation, his examiners dispensed with the oral examination as superfluous.

Believing himself called to religious life, he went to Leuven and entered the Congregation of the Sacred Hearts of Jesus and Mary. After a novitiate of eighteen months, he was admitted to religious profession on April 11, 1851, taking the name Herman. After three years of theologate, he was sent by his superiors to the Kingdom of Hawaiʻi for work as a missionary. He arrived in Honolulu on November 13, 1854, and was subsequently ordained to the priesthood as a member of the Congregation of the Sacred Hearts of Jesus and Mary on May 31, 1862, at the age of 34.

Koeckemann served as pastor to the fledgling Catholic community of native Hawaiians. When Msgr. Louis Maigret fell ill, Father Koeckemann was appointed coadjutor vicar apostolic to fulfill some of the bishop's regular duties. On August 21, 1881, Father Koeckemann was ordained at Saint Mary's Cathedral in San Francisco, California, as a bishop of the titular see of Olba at the age of 53, with a papal mandate to serve as coadjutor Vicar Apostolic with right of succession.

Upon Msgr. Maigret's death, Msgr. Koeckemann succeeded as vicar apostolic on June 11, 1882. During his episcopate, the massive migration of Portuguese workers for the sugarcane plantations from Madeira Islands and the Azores began. With the subsequent increase in population from these migrations, Msgr. Koeckemann made Catholic education a priority of the Vicariate and built many schools with the Marianist brothers.

He died in Honolulu in 1892 and was buried at the Honolulu Catholic Cemetery in downtown Honolulu.

== Order of Kalākaua ==
King David Kalākaua bestowed on Herman the honor "Knight Commander of the Royal Order of Kalākaua" in 1881.

== Sources ==
Catholic Church titles
| Preceded by Louis Maigret | Vicar Apostolic of the Hawaiian Islands; 1882–1892 | Succeeded by Gulstan Ropert |
