= Joan Elizabeth Bichier des Âges =

French Roman Catholic saint

Saint Joan Elizabeth Bichier des Âges F.C.
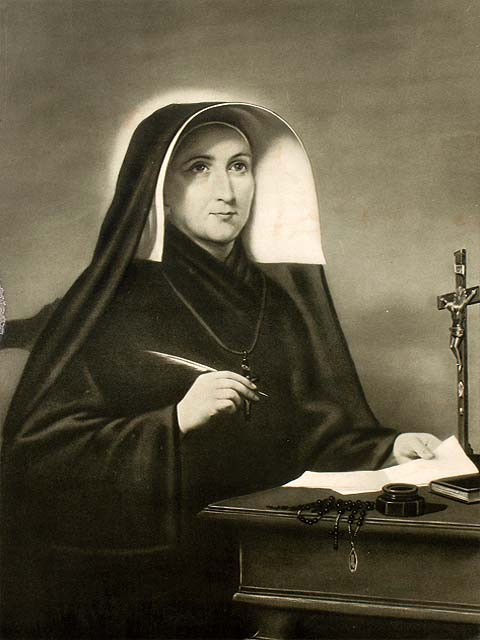
- Born: July 5, 1773; Château des Âges, Poitou, Kingdom of France
- Died: August 26, 1838 (aged 65); Château des Âges, Poitou, Kingdom of France
- Venerated in: Roman Catholic Church (Sisters of the Cross, Sisters of St. Andrew)
- Beatified: 13 May 1934 by Pope Pius XI
- Canonized: 6 July 1947 by Pope Pius XII
- Feast: 26 August

Joan Elizabeth Lucy Bichier des Âges (French: Jeanne-Élisabeth-Lucie Bichier des Âges) (5 July 1773 – 26 August 1838) was a French religious sister, commonly referred to as Elizabeth Bichier. Together with Andrew Fournet, she founded the Sisters of the Cross, Sisters of St. Andrew, a religious congregation which was established for the care of the poor and the instruction of rural children in the Diocese of Poitiers in 1807. She also helped to inspire the founding of a community of priests dedicated to missionary service, the Congregation of the Sacred Heart of Jesus of Betharram. She has been declared a saint by the Catholic Church.

== Life ==
=== Early life ===
Bichier was born in 1773 in the Château des Âges, home of her aristocratic family near the village of Le Blanc, then in the ancient province of Poitou (now the department of Indre), located in the Central Loire Valley. She was one of the couple's four children and later was commonly called Elizabeth by her family. She was baptized that same day at the local Church of Saint-Génitour. Her mother was a religious person and ensured that her daughter was taught how to pray and the basics of the Catholic faith. Elizabeth proved a ready student, already feeling drawn to prayer from her childhood.

After the outbreak of the French Revolution, the local population resented the restrictions placed on the practice of the Catholic faith. Within a few years, this unrest led to various popular uprisings. During this period, her oldest brother, Laurent, chose to emigrate from France. Shortly after that, their father fell ill and later died on 16 January 1792.

Her brother's departure was to cause the remaining great distress, as the regulations of the Civil Constitution of the Clergy put into law by the National Constituent Assembly, which had declared all property of the Church to be declared national goods, were then being applied to émigrés like Laurent Bichier des Âges. Under this law, their ancestral castle was liable to confiscation, so Elizabeth and her mother moved to their house in the village. Under the Law of Suspects, the local Revolutionary Surveillance Committee then began to harass the family with daily visits, urging them to take the oath of loyalty to the Civil Constitution. The pair steadfastly refused. In the course of one such visit, some weapons that had belonged to her father from his younger days were discovered in the house's attic. Elizabeth was then briefly imprisoned together with her mother in Châteauroux. Another brother, who had joined the forces of Revolution, quickly obtained their release.

In 1796, the two Bichier women moved to the family's country home in Béthines called La Guimetière. While living there, Elizabeth began to feel the loss of the Eucharist in her life, as the local church was being served by a juring priest, for which it was rejected by the local people. From her childhood, she had been attracted to contemplation, and she had consecrated herself to the Virgin Mary. Her wish was to consecrate her life to God in an enclosed religious order, but she did not tell her mother. During this period she used to gather people and pray with them.

=== A new direction ===
The following year, a former servant came by the house and covertly informed them that a refractory priest would be presiding at a secret Mass at a farm in Marsyllis, about ten miles (16 km) away. This was the Abbé Andrew Fournet, the underground pastor of Maillé, who would give Bichier a new direction in her life, answering her longings. The following week she set out at night on a donkey, led by the same former servant, to participate in the service. After a journey of three hours, they arrived at the site. After the Mass, Fournet began to hear the confessions of the people. As Bichier approached him, the peasants gave way to her, an aristocrat. Fournet challenged Bichier over her presumption, and she let him hear the confessions of the entire congregation, going last just as the sun was rising.

Bichier opened her heart to Fournet. She shared her longing to dedicate herself to God. He, for his part, had seen first hand the situation of his rural congregants, who had lost all resources for education in the turmoil of the Revolution. He asked her to open her home for the catechesis of the local children. Elizabeth asked the permission of her mother, who agreed to this project, and a small school slowly began to develop at La Guimetière.

With the signing of the Concordat of 1801 between France and the Holy See under Napoleon, the Catholic Church was able to resume public activity. Bichier used her influence to ensure that one of the new missionary centers being established to revive the faith be located in Béthines. Fournet was one of the priests who were based there. After her mother died in 1804, he proposed that Bichier recruit a group of women who would dedicate their lives to the mission. She found four other companions for this venture, and the following year, she and her servant, Marianne Meunier, went to the Congregation of Divine Providence in Poitiers to learn the fundamentals of consecrated life. When they returned to La Guimetière in 1806, they were joined by two of Bichier's friends, Véronique de Lavergne and Madeleine Moreau.

=== Foundress ===
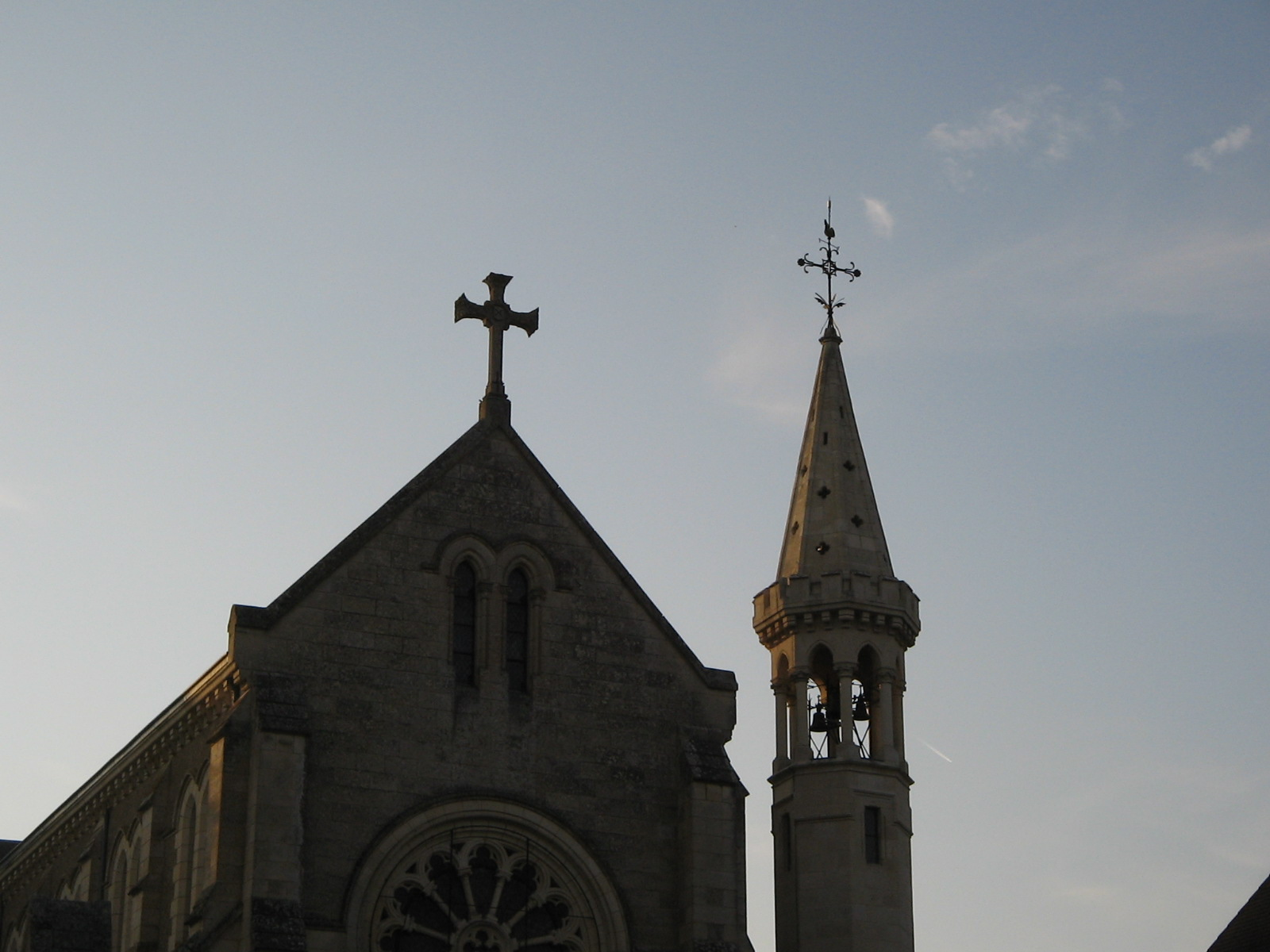
A view of the chapel of the motherhouse of the Daughters of the Cross in La Puye, resting place of St. Elizabeth Bichier

The small community felt it wiser to be closer to Fournet, their spiritual guide, and relocated to Maillé. They needed a home that would both accommodate the community and provide a place for their work. For this, they were able to acquire the local chateau. There the community was joined by Anne Bannier. In February 1807, the five community members professed religious vows, establishing the new congregation of the Sisters of the Cross.

The small community began to expand quickly, and the schools began to multiply where the Daughters could exercise their ministry to the poor and needy. In 1816 the community received ecclesiastical approval. By 1820 they had expanded again, and a former monastery of the Order of Fontevrault was obtained in La Puye, where their motherhouse was established. It still serves as the congregation's headquarters. Within ten years, there were over sixty communities of Sisters of the Cross. In 1850 they established their first foreign foundation, in Bilbao, Spain.

Bichier died in 1838, at which time there were about 600 Daughters of the Cross serving in some 100 communities.

== Veneration ==
Bichier was beatified by Pope Pius XI in 1934 and canonized by Pope Pius XII in 1947. Her remains are enshrined at the motherhouse in La Puye.

== Legacy ==
Having reached a high number in membership of some 3,100 at the start of the 20th century, with 430 houses, today, they number about 600 members. They currently serve or have served around the globe in France, Spain, Italy, Hungary, Belgium, Argentina, Brazil, Canada, Uruguay, the Democratic Republic of the Congo, Burkina Faso, Ivory Coast, China, and Thailand.
