= Sisters of the Cross, Sisters of St. Andrew =

The Sisters of the Cross, Sisters of St. Andrew (French: Filles de la Croix, Sœurs de Saint-André; Latin: Institutum Filiarum Crucis seu Sororum Sancti Andreae), is a religious institute of pontifical right whose members profess public vows of chastity, poverty, and obedience and follow the evangelical way of life in common.

Their mission includes instruction and education of youth and care of the sick.

This religious institute was founded in the Chateau de Molante, near Saint-Pierre-de-Maillé, France, in 1807, by St. Andrew Fournet, with the help of St. Joan Elizabeth Bichier des Âges. The institute received pontifical status in 1867.

The sisters have houses in Argentina, Brazil, Burkina Faso, Canada, France, Italy, Ivory Coast, Spain and Uruguay. The Generalate of the Congregation can be found in Saint-Pierre-de-Maillé, France.

In 2000, Maria Laura Mainetti, an Italian Sister of the Cross, was stabbed to death in a satanic sacrifice by three teenage girls in Chiavenna.

As at 31 December 2005 there were 636 sisters in 122 communities.
