= Maria Laura Mainetti =

20th-century Catholic martyr

Blessed Maria Laura Mainetti FDLC

Virgin and martyr
- Born: Teresina Elsa Mainetti; 20 August 1939; Villatico, Colico, Lecco, Kingdom of Italy
- Residence: Chiavenna, Sondrio, Italy
- Died: 6 June 2000 (aged 60); Chiavenna, Sondrio, Italy
- Venerated in: Roman Catholic Church
- Beatified: 6 June 2021, Stadio Comunale, Chiavenna, Sondrio, Italy by Cardinal Marcello Semeraro
- Major shrine: Collegiate Church of Saint Lawrence; Chiavenna, Sondrio, Italy
- Feast: 6 June

Maria Laura Mainetti (born Teresina Elsa Mainetti; 20 August 1939 – 6 June 2000) was an Italian religious sister of the Sisters of the Cross. Mother superior of a convent in Chiavenna that specialised in helping juvenile delinquents, she was stabbed to death in a satanic sacrifice by three teenage girls on the night of 6 June 2000. Mainetti's death was declared a martyrdom by the Congregation for the Causes of Saints in 2020, and she was beatified on 6 June 2021, the twenty-first anniversary of her murder.

== Life ==
Teresina Elsa Mainetti was born on 20 August 1939 in Villatico, a frazione of Colico, Lecco, Italy, and was baptised two days later. She was the tenth and last child born to Marcellina Gusmeroli (who died when Teresina was 12 days old) and Stefano Mainetti.

She attended the Istituto Magistrale run by the Sisters of the Cross in Parma, and decided to join the Sisters of the Cross after turning 18. Mainetti began her postulancy in Rome on 22 August 1957 and was admitted into the novitiate in February 1958. On 15 August 1959, she made her first vows to live according to the evangelical counsels, taking the sister name Laura in honour of the late daughter of another sister. Mainetti made her final vows in La Puye on 25 August 1964.

After teaching at primary schools run by the Sisters of the Cross in Vasto, Rome, Parma and Chiavenna, she became mother superior of a convent in Chiavenna specialising in providing help for juvenile delinquents.

== Murder ==
Location of the murder

Around 22:00 on 6 June 2000, Mainetti left her convent in Chiavenna and went to a local public square to meet a girl who had recently requested an appointment via telephone, claiming to have been raped and impregnated and to be considering an abortion. There, Mainetti encountered the girl, Veronica Pietrobelli, and the latter's friends, Milena De Giambattista and Ambra Gianasso. The three girls, aged 16 and 17, lured Mainetti down a nearby street to a secluded area outside a park where they ambushed her, stoning and shouting abuse at her before taking turns in stabbing her with a kitchen knife that De Giambattista was carrying. Mainetti prayed as she was being attacked, asking God to forgive the girls, before dying after having been stabbed 19 times. Mainetti's body was found the next morning by a passerby.

The girls were arrested on suspicion of the murder three weeks later, after two of them discussed what they had done in a telephone conversation—police had monitored the girls' telephones after a witness claimed to have seen them with Mainetti. In custody, the girls initially said they killed the sister "for sport", later saying they killed her in a satanic sacrifice. They told investigators they had initially wanted to kill the parish priest, but decided that Mainetti, who had previously taught them catechism, would be an easier target; and that their intention had been to stab the sister 18 times—6 times per girl, as per the number of the beast; the nineteenth stab wound was inflicted "by mistake". After a summary trial at the juvenile court of Milan on 9 August 2001, De Giambattista and Pietrobelli were convicted of murder and sentenced to 8 years and 6 months' imprisonment, with the court taking into account that they were partially insane at the time of the crime; their sentences were later upheld by the city's appeal court. Gianasso, who was initially found not guilty of murder by reason of insanity, was sentenced to 12 years and 4 months' imprisonment by the appeal court on 4 April 2002; she was released on 17 January 2003 after the Supreme Court of Cassation failed to reach a verdict on an appeal she had filed, before returning to prison six days later after the court upheld her sentence.

By 2008, all three perpetrators had been released from prison after participating in community service programs.

== Legacy and beatification ==
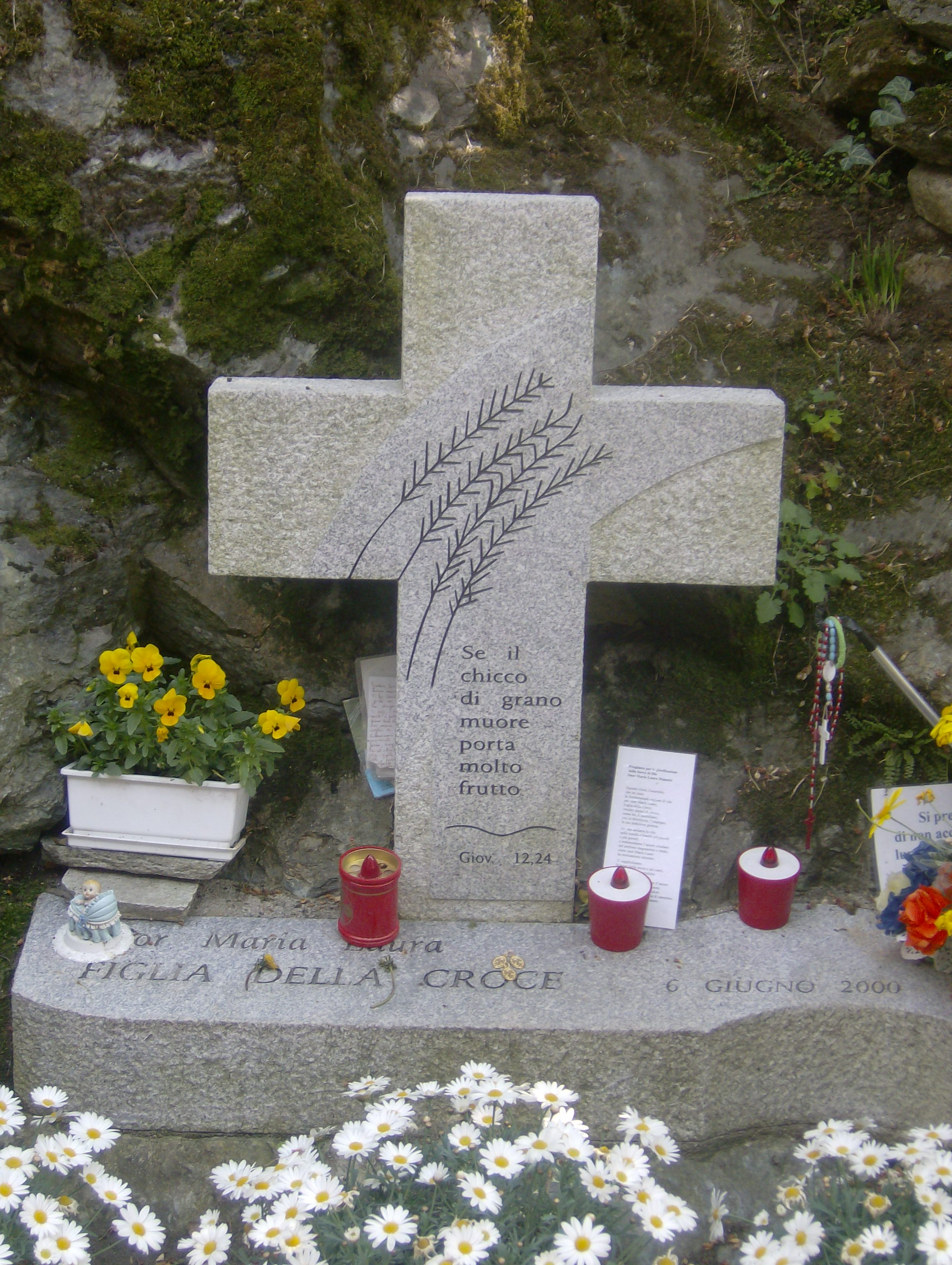
Memorial for Mainetti at the site of her murder. The following bible verse is inscribed: "If the grain of wheat dies, it bears much fruit" (John 12:24)

Mainetti's funeral on 9 June 2000 was attended by some 2,500 mourners. On 23 October 2005, Alessandro Maggiolini, Bishop of the Diocese of Como, opened the diocesan phase of Mainetti's beatification process at the Collegiate Church of Saint Lawrence in Chiavenna.

On 20 March 2008, Maggiolini announced that the request for the initiation of Mainetti's beatification process had been approved. The Congregation for the Causes of Saints declared her a martyr, eliminating the need for recognition of a miracle. The Congregation declared her a martyr again on 19 June 2020. She was beatified on 6 June 2021, the twenty-first anniversary of her murder.

On 26 February 2019, Mainetti's remains were exhumed from Chiavenna cemetery and placed in the Collegiate Church of Saint Lawrence.
