= Libert H. Boeynaems =

Belgian Catholic bishop

The Most Reverend Libert Hubert Boeynaems SS.CC.
- Vicar Apostolic of Hawaiian Islands
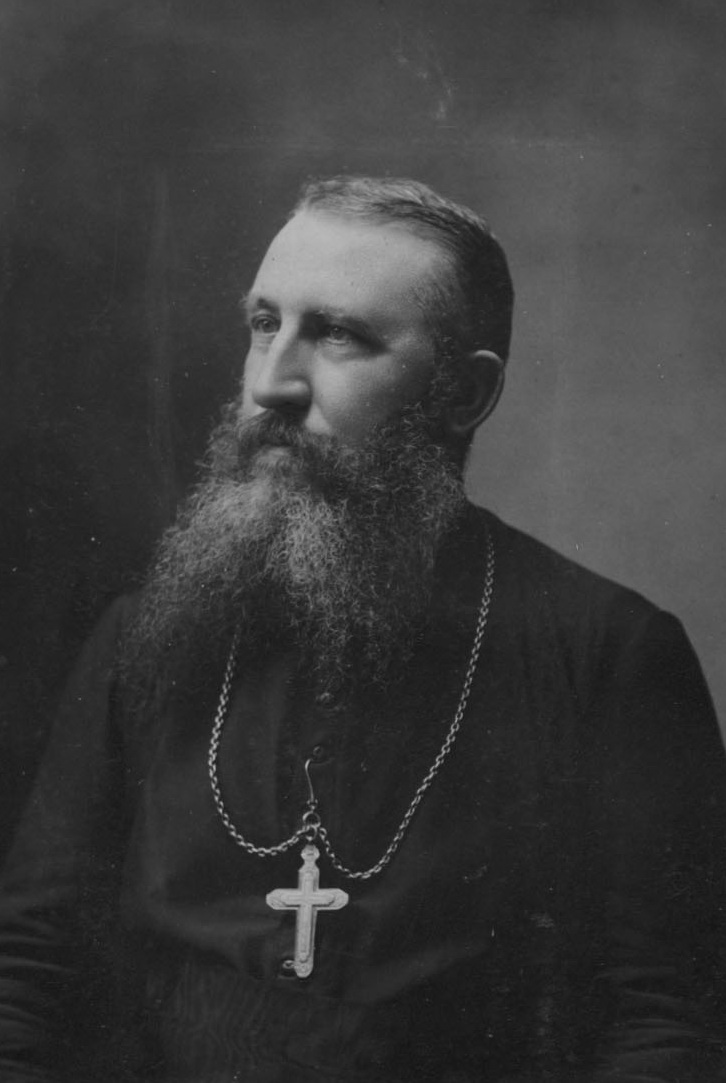
- Church: Roman Catholic
- See: Titular Bishop of Zeugma in Syria
- Appointed: April 6, 1903
- In office: 1903–1926
- Predecessor: Gulstan Ropert
- Successor: Stephen Alencastre

Orders
- Ordination: September 11, 1881
- Consecration: July 25, 1903 by George Thomas Montgomery
- Rank: Bishop

Personal details
- Born: August 18, 1857 Antwerp, Belgium
- Died: May 13, 1926 (aged 68)
- Buried: Honolulu Catholic Cemetery

Styles of Libert Hubert Boeynaems
- Reference style: His Excellency; The Most Reverend
- Spoken style: Your Excellency
- Religious style: Bishop

Libert H. Boeynaems, formally Libert Hubert John Louis Boeynaems SS.CC. (August 18, 1857 – May 13, 1926) was a Belgian Catholic priest who served as the fourth vicar apostolic of the Vicariate Apostolic of the Hawaiian Islands – now the Roman Catholic Diocese of Honolulu.

He was born in Antwerp, Belgium, the son of John Boeynaems and Leopoldina (née Van Opstal). He was educated at the Jesuit college of Antwerp and the Major Seminary, Mechelen and finished his scholasticate at the Catholic University of Leuven. Boeynaems was ordained to the priesthood as a member of the Congregation of the Sacred Hearts of Jesus and Mary on September 11, 1881.

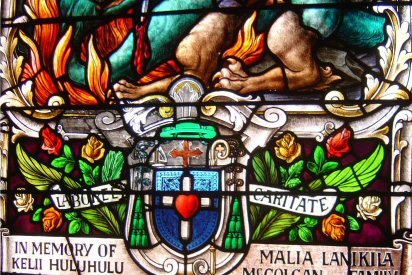
Episcopal arms of Boeynaems at the base of the stained glass window of Saint Michael the Archangel, Cathedral of Our Lady of Peace, Honolulu.

As part of his missionary work, Boeynaems sailed to the Kingdom of Hawaiʻi arriving in Honolulu on November 29, 1881, to become a pastor in January 1882 to the fledgling Catholic community of native Hawaiians on the island of Kauaʻi in the district encompassing Līhuʻe to Hanalei. He later ministered to those on Kauaʻi in the district encompassing Līhuʻe to Mana. During his first few years in Honolulu, Boeynaems was a witness to the 1893 overthrow of the Hawaiian monarchy, proclamation of the Republic of Hawaiʻi and establishment of the United States Territory of Hawaiʻi. In 1895, he was transferred to Wailuku, Maui.

In December 1902, the Holy See appointed him pro-vicar. On April 8, 1903, he was appointed Vicar Apostolic and was subsequently consecrated titular Bishop of Zeugma in Syria by Archbishop Montgomery in Saint Mary's Cathedral in San Francisco on July 25, 1903. On April 11, 1915, Boeynaems consecrated Saint Agnes-in-the-Palms at Kakaʻako, a former Protestant church at the intersection of Kawaiahao and Kamani streets in Honolulu, to serve the growing population of Portuguese and native Hawaiians in the Kaka‘ako district. During his bishopric he established several schools and orphanages.

After his death, he was buried at the Honolulu Catholic Cemetery in downtown Honolulu near Thomas Square at the intersection of Ward Avenue and King Street.

Catholic Church titles
Preceded by Gulstan Ropert	Vicar Apostolic of the Hawaiian Islands; 1903–1926	Succeeded by Stephen Alencastre
