= Honolulu Catholic Cemetery =

Cemetery in Honolulu, Hawaii

Coordinates: 21°18′15″N 157°51′9″W

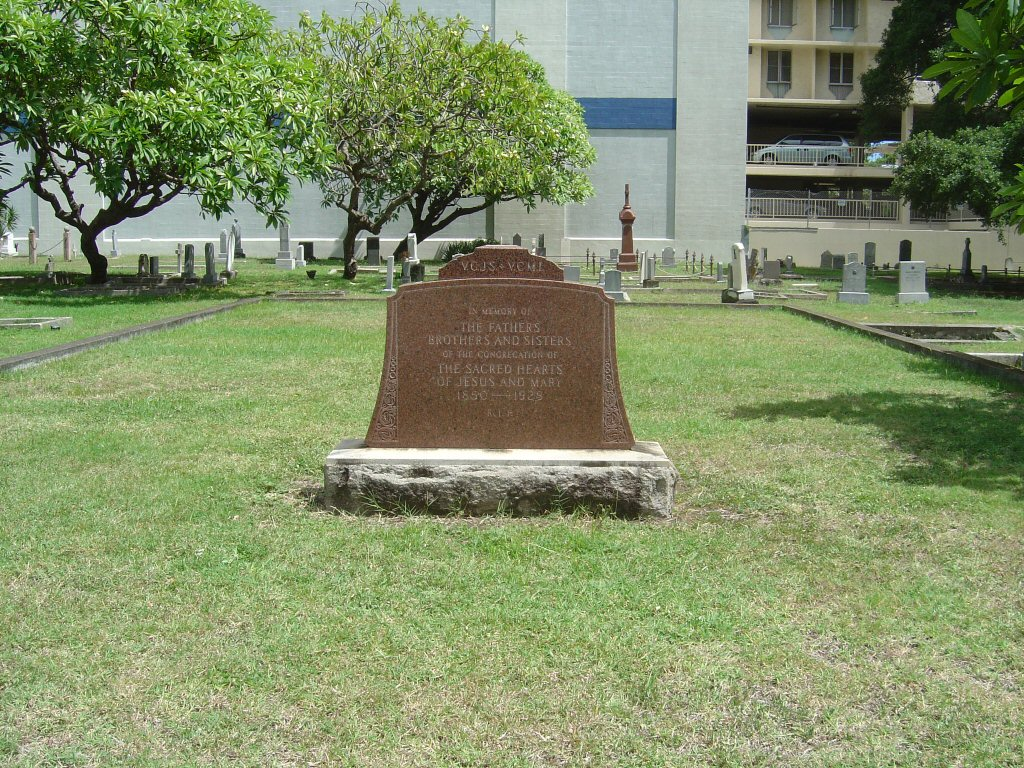
- Mass grave of early Sacred Hearts Missionaries
- Interactive map of Honolulu Catholic Cemetery

Details
- Established: 1840s
- Location: 839-A South King Street
- Country: United States
- Type: Catholic
- No. of interments: <1000
- Find a Grave: Honolulu Catholic Cemetery

The Honolulu Catholic Cemetery (also known as the King Street Catholic Cemetery) is a cemetery in Honolulu, Hawaii. The cemetery is for Catholics and is located at 839-A South King Street, . It is maintained by the Diocese of Honolulu and has been the final resting place for many Catholics from Honolulu before 1930. The cemetery is closed to further burials by the Hawaii Department of Health.

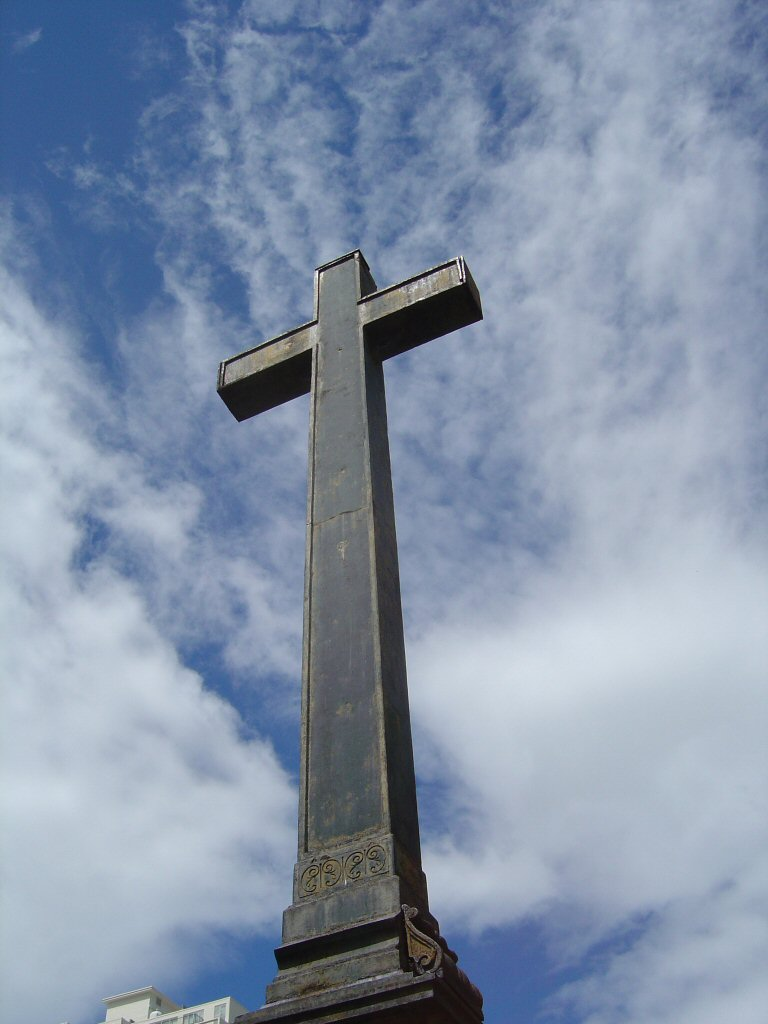
Central iron cross above the graves of the Vicars Apostolic

The origins of the cemetery were two separate lots. The first lot was given by the Kingdom of Hawaii to the Catholic mission during the 1840s and was identified by the title "Claim No. 4". The second lot was purchased by several wealthy Catholics and given to the Catholic mission. Originally on the outskirts of the village of Honolulu, with the makai side consisting of estuarine wetlands and man-made ponds for the harvesting of sea salt (or paʻakai in Hawaiian). The Waikiki side of the cemetery was the old Plantation and rice paddies. In 1889, the cemetery consisted of scattered graves and overrunning paths. Wealthier Catholics ensured that their private plots were enclosed by wooden or iron fences and a tombstone. Msgr. Koeckemann erected the tall iron cross in the center of the cemetery. He was eventually laid to rest under the cross. Several other bishops of the Congregation of the Sacred Hearts of Jesus and Mary, (Msgri. Gulstan Ropert, Libert H. Boeynaems, and Stephen Alencastre) were also buried next to Msgr. Koeckemann. Remains of some forty of the early members of the Congregation of the Sacred Hearts also lay buried since 1853 in a common grave on site. Other notable people buried in this cemetery include: the native Hawaiian patriot and former delegate to the United States Congress, Robert William Wilcox; Princess Eugenie Ninito Sumner of Tahiti, wife of High Chief John Kapilikea Sumner, and friend of Queen Liliʻuokalani.

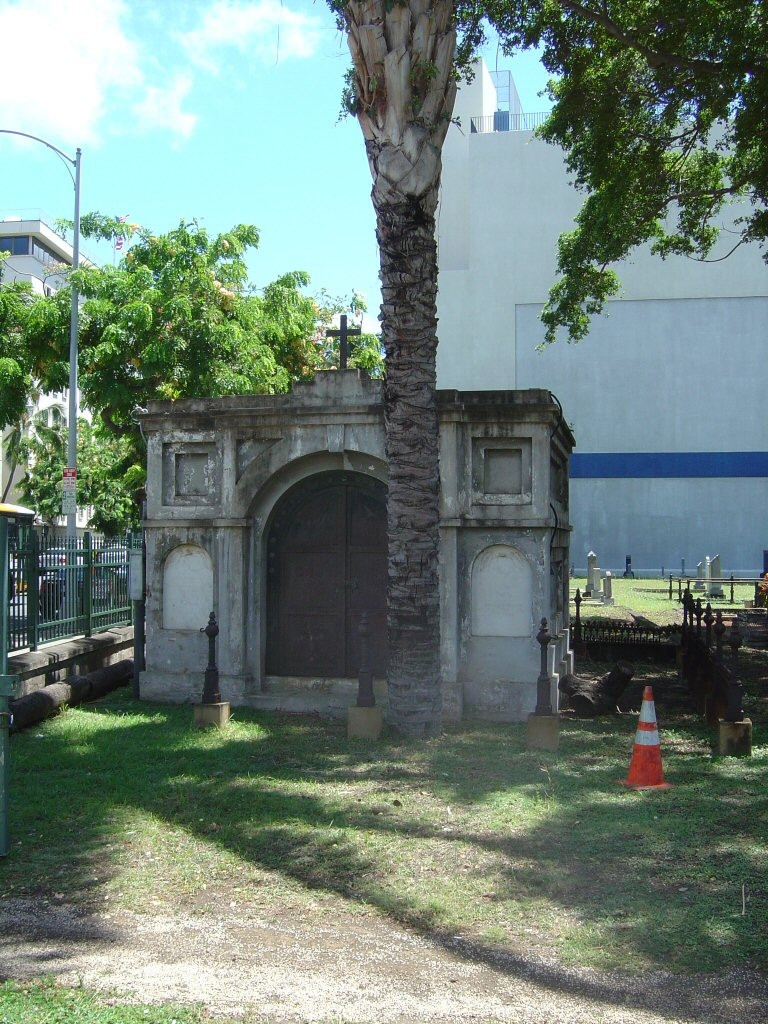
Montgomery family crypt at the entrance to the cemetery

In 1889, shortly after his arrival in Honolulu, Father Valentin Franckx, SS.CC., former pastor of Saint Augustine by the Sea Catholic Church in Waikīkī laid out a central road and side paths in the cemetery so that each lot could be reached without walking over neighboring lots. Many trees were removed and in 1892, Father Valentin planted the stately royal palms that line the main lane to the cemetery. Father Valentin reported that a society was organized for the upkeep and improvement of the cemetery. Members paid an annual fee of five dollars.

A permanent sexton was appointed and anyone acquiring a lot paid ten dollars for a grave and another ten dollars for the digging. The makai portion of the cemetery was found to be unfit for digging to the six-foot depth required by the Board of Health.

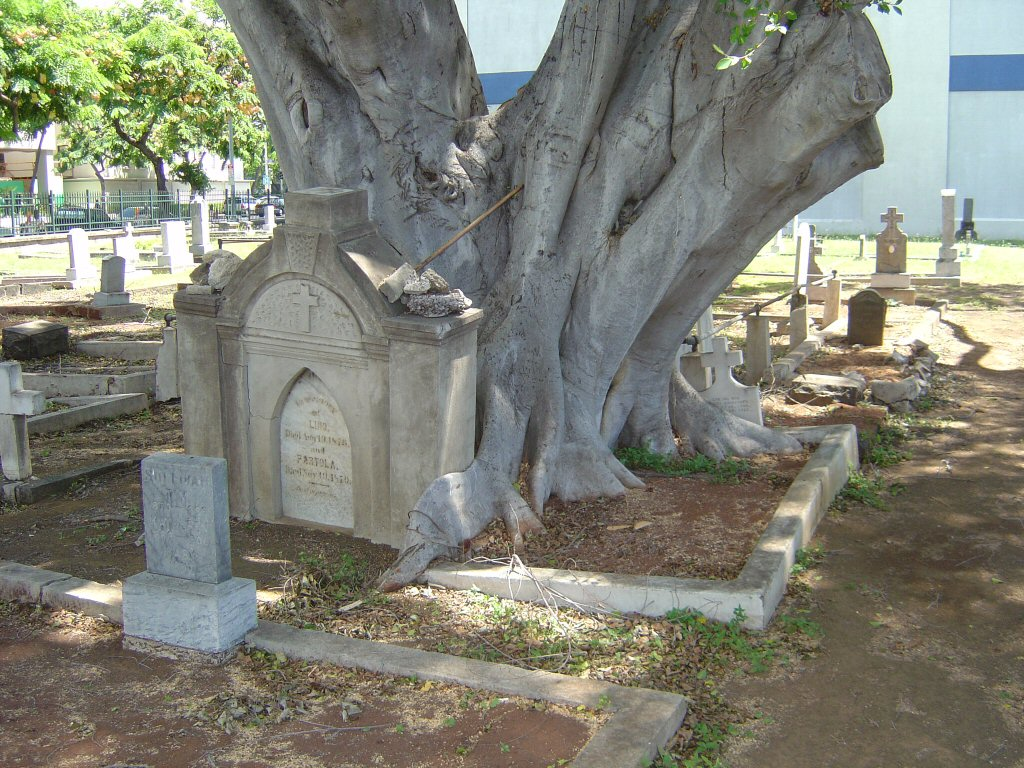
Ficus growing on gravesite

To alleviate encountering ground water during burials, Father Valentin approved the importation of new soil from the nearby Armory.

After the closure of the cemetery by the Board of Health, the vicariate made arrangements for Catholic interments at Diamond Head Memorial Park. As of 2004, the lots closest to King Street are watered and maintained better. Those plots further in (close to the Hawaiian Electric Company yard) appear to be minimally maintained, if at all. Several grave markers are sequestered at the corner of what appears to have been a chapel and tree roots from a Ficus have obscured the original plots.

== Sources ==
- "Old King Street Catholic Cemetery", by Father Valentin Franckx, in The Catholic Herald, June 3, 1938, Honolulu.
