= Arad (see) =

Titular Catholic episcopal see named after ancient Negev city

The titular episcopal see of Arad is a Roman Catholic titular see named after the ancient city of Arad (see Tel Arad). Sources mention a 6th-century Bishop Stephan.

== History ==
The titular episcopal see of Arad is named for ancient Arad, which stood at the site of Tell 'Arad (Arabic) or Tel Arad (Hebrew), in the province of Palestina III, metropolinate of Petra (see Archbishop of Petra and List of Catholic titular sees: Petra in Palaestina). The remains of ancient Arad were excavated in the Negev in modern Israel, but apparently no remains from the relevant period have been discovered.

== Titular see ==
The diocese was nominally restored as a titular see of the lowest (episcopal) rank in 1725.

It is vacant since 1969 after having had the following, often non-consecutive incumbents:

- Karol Poniński (1725–1727)
- Caspar Adolph Schnernauer (1728–1733)
- Franz Joseph Anton von Hahn (1734–1748)
- Andrés Cano y Junquera (1748–1749)
- Toussaint Duvernin (23 May 1757 – 1785)
- Julio Maria Pecori (d'Ameno), Franciscan (Order of Friars Minor Reform, O.F.M. Ref.; 1788–1796)
- Friar Ignacy Houwalt (1804–1807)
- Giovanni Domenico Rizzolati, Franciscans (O.F.M.) (1839–1862)
- Pedro José Tordoya Montoya (1880–1881)
- Augustine Kandathil (1911–1923) (later archbishop)
- Pierre Aziz Ho (1924–1929)
- Jacob Abraham Theophilos Kalapurakal (Feb.–June 1932)
- Pierre-Marie Gourtay, Spiritans (C.S.Sp.) (1933–1944)
- Vicente Roig y Villalba, Capuchins (O.F.M. Cap.) (1944–1969)

== See also ==
- Catholic Church in Israel
- Catholic Church in Jordan
- Catholic Church in Palestine
