= Stephen Alencastre =

Portuguese-American Catholic bishop in Hawaii

The Most Reverend Stephen Peter Alencastre SSCC
- Vicar Apostolic of Hawaiian Islands
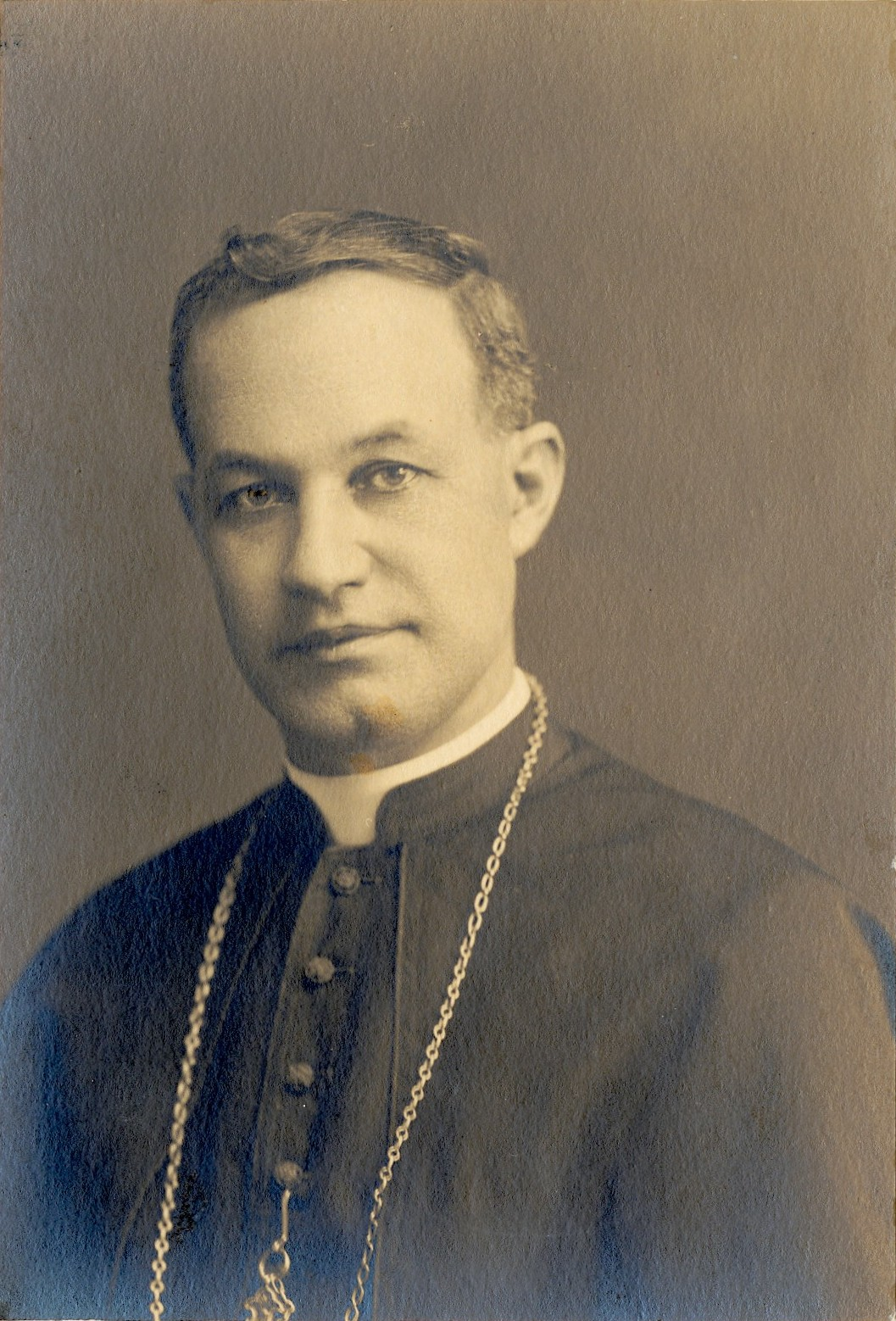
- Bishop Alencastre, c. 1910
- Church: Catholic
- See: Titular Bishop of Arabissus
- In office: 1926–1940
- Predecessor: Libert H. Boeynaems
- Successor: James Joseph Sweeney

Orders
- Ordination: 5 April 1902
- Consecration: 24 August 1924 by John Joseph Cantwell
- Rank: Bishop

Personal details
- Born: November 3, 1876 Porto Santo, Madeira Islands, Portugal
- Died: November 9, 1940 (aged 64) En route to Los Angeles, California
- Coat of arms

Bishop Stephen Peter Alencastre, SSCC (born Estêvão Pedro de Alencastre; November 3, 1876 – November 9, 1940) was a bishop of the Catholic Church who served as the fifth and last Vicar Apostolic of the Vicariate Apostolic of the Hawaiian Islands (now the Diocese of Honolulu). He was also an apparent titular bishop of Arabissus.

== Early life ==
Born on the island of Porto Santo in the Madeira Islands of Portugal and brought to Hawai‘i as an infant, Alencastre later returned to Europe to finish his seminary studies in Belgium. He was ordained to the priesthood on April 5, 1902, at the age of 25, as a member of the Congregation of the Sacred Hearts of Jesus and Mary and returned to serve the people of Hawai‘i.

== Episcopacy ==
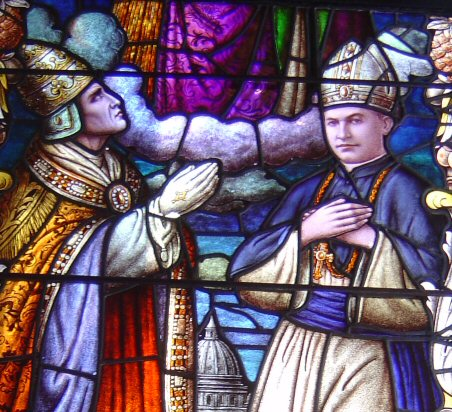
Pope Pius XI invokes the blessing of Saint Joseph, on Alencastre, in a window in the Cathedral of Our Lady of Peace, Honolulu.

When the Vicar Apostolic, Libert H. Boeynaems, SSCC, fell ill, Alencastre was appointed by Pope Pius XI as coadjutor Vicar Apostolic, with the right of succession, on April 29, 1924. On August 24 of that year, he was consecrated Titular Bishop of Arabissus at the age of 47.

Upon the death of Boeynaems on May 13, 1926, Alencastre automatically succeeded him as Vicar Apostolic of the Hawaiian Islands. He was the first bishop in Hawai‘i to have been raised in the Hawaiian Islands.

Alencastre's personal mission included continuing to expand the number of schools and parish churches in the Islands (and to renovate the existing ones) and to build a seminary to form vowed religious locally to the priesthood. This came to fruition with the building of St. Stephen's Seminary, named in honor of the Bishop's own patron saint, which is still operational. The bishop was also partly responsible for the increase in the variety of religious orders in Hawai‘i, inviting such groups as the Sisters of St. Joseph of Carondelet and the Maryknolls to help spread of Catholicism in the Hawaiian Islands.

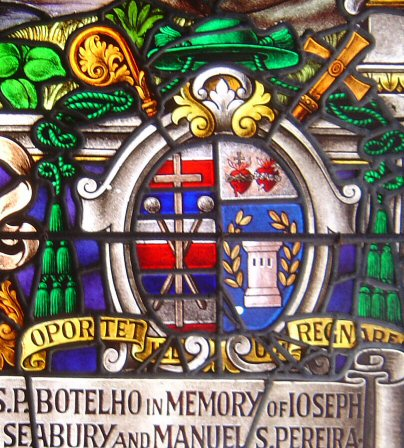
Alencastre's episcopal arms

=== Episcopal arms ===
A window in the Cathedral of Our Lady of Peace in Honolulu depicts his episcopal coat-of-arms, as well as a portrayal of a blessing being bestowed upon him by Pope Pius XI. His episcopal motto was "Opportet illum regnare" ("He [Christ] must reign"), derived from a phrase in 1 Corinthians 15: 24–26.

Bishop Alencastre was the first to include in his episcopal arms the Pūloʻuloʻu (kapu sticks)—traditional symbols of the Hawaiian people, and the colours of the Hawaiian flag. In keeping with the traditions of ecclesiastical heraldry, he utilized the green galero, a hat reserved for bishops and cardinals, at the top of his arms.

== Death and legacy ==
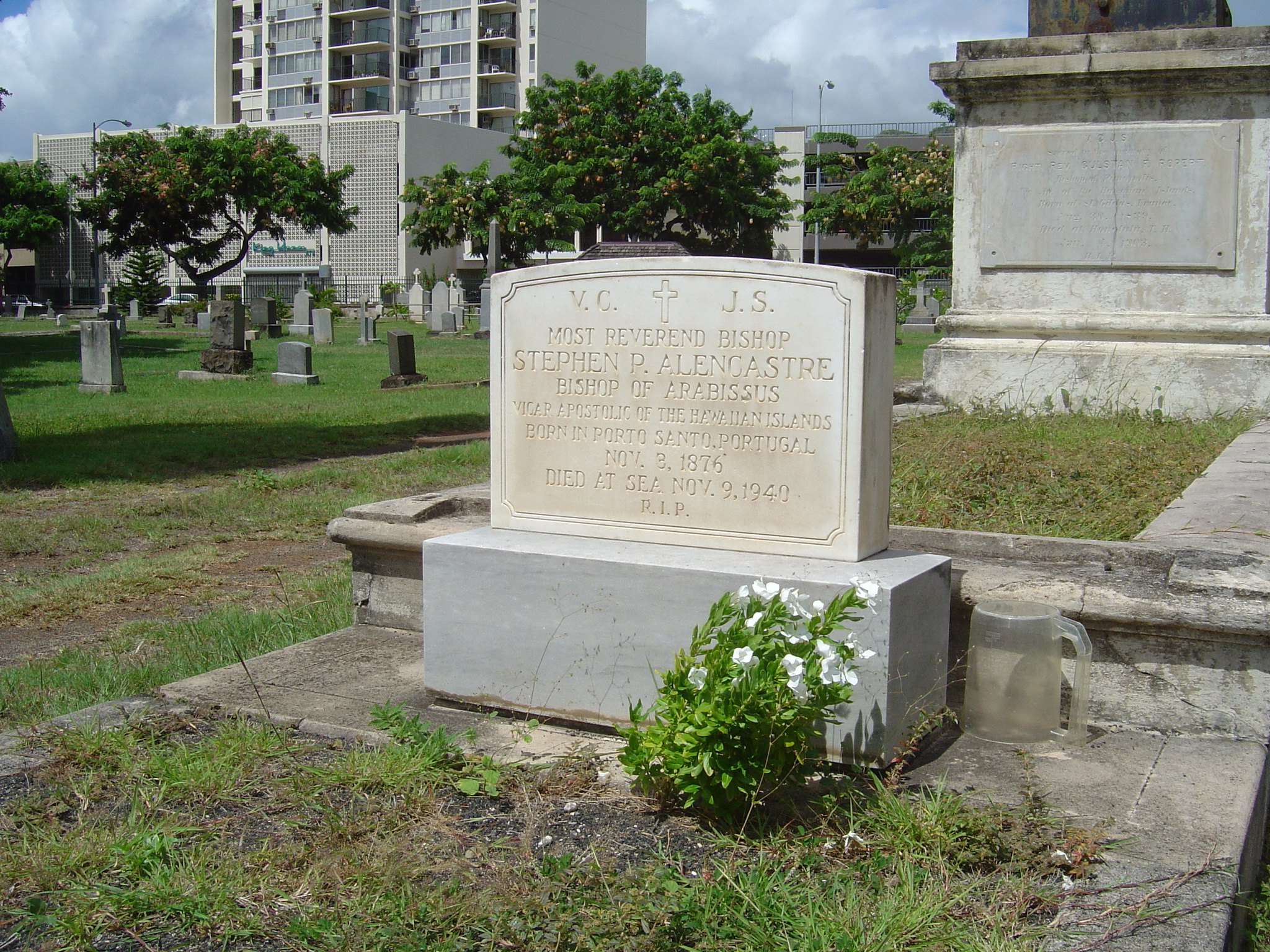
Headstone at the grave of Alencastre. The grave of Ropert is directly behind.

Alencastre died in 1940 on a boat en route to Hawai‘i from Los Angeles, California—six days after his 64th birthday. He was subsequently interred at the Honolulu Catholic Cemetery in downtown Honolulu.

Following his death, he was posthumously awarded the honor of "Officer of the Order of the Crown" by King Leopold III of Belgium, while a street in Honolulu bears his surname.

After continuing and completing much of the work begun by Alencastre and his Sacred Hearts predecessors, the mission area of the Hawaiian Islands was elevated to the status of the Diocese of Honolulu by Pope Pius XII a few months following his death. The history of the Catholic Sacred Hearts mission in the Hawaiian Islands was documented by one of the congregation's priests and later compiled and published in a book called Pioneers of the Faith.

Catholic Church titles
Preceded by Libert H. Boeynaems	Vicar Apostolic of the Hawaiian Islands; 1926–1940	Succeeded by Catholic Bishop of Honolulu
