= Saint-Pierre-de-Maillé =

- Commune
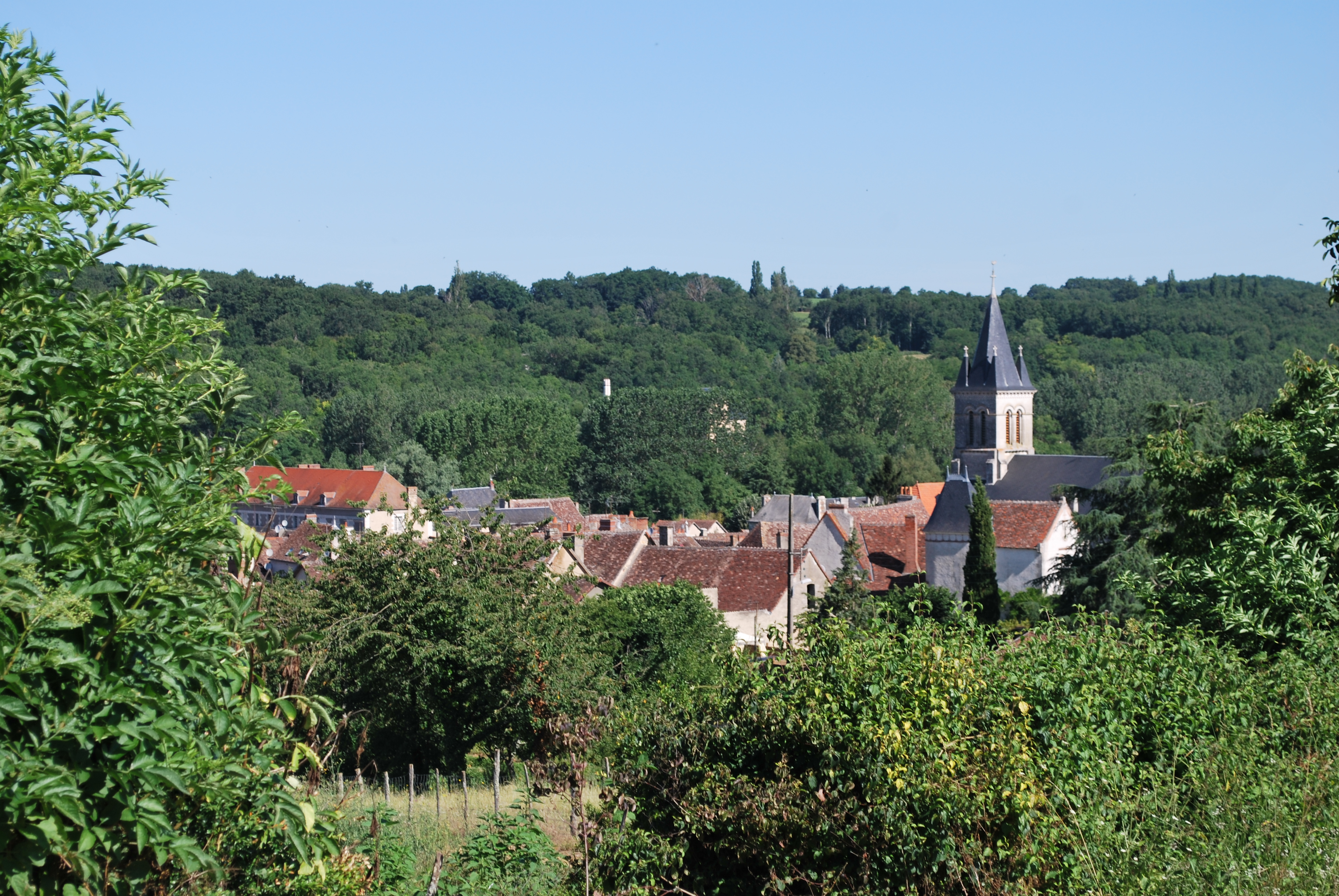
- A general view of Saint-Pierre-de-Maillé
- Location of Saint-Pierre-de-Maillé
- Location within France Location within Nouvelle-Aquitaine
- Coordinates: 46°40′47″N 0°50′40″E
- Country: France
- Region: Nouvelle-Aquitaine
- Department: Vienne
- Arrondissement: Montmorillon
- Canton: Montmorillon

Government
  - Mayor (2020–2026): Christele Raimbert
- Area^{1}: 74.89 km^{2} (28.92 sq mi)
- Elevation: 76 m (249 ft)
- Highest elevation: 147 m (482 ft)
- Lowest elevation: 64 m (210 ft)
- Population (2023): 836
  - Density: 11.2/km^{2} (28.9/sq mi)
- Time zone: UTC+01:00 (CET)
  - Summer (DST): UTC+02:00 (CEST)
- INSEE/Postal code: 86236 /86260
- ^{1} French Land Register data, which excludes lakes, ponds, glaciers > 1 km^{2} (0.386 sq mi or 247 acres) and river estuaries.

Saint-Pierre-de-Maillé (French pronunciation: [sɛ̃ pjɛʁ də maje]) is a commune in the Vienne department in the Nouvelle-Aquitaine region in western France.

== Geography ==
The commune is traversed by the river Gartempe.

== Facilities ==
Since 2020 the village has been home to a Catholic Boarding School for boys, St Peters International College. https://www.stpetersfr.com/

== See also ==
- Communes of the Vienne department
