= La Puye =

- Commune
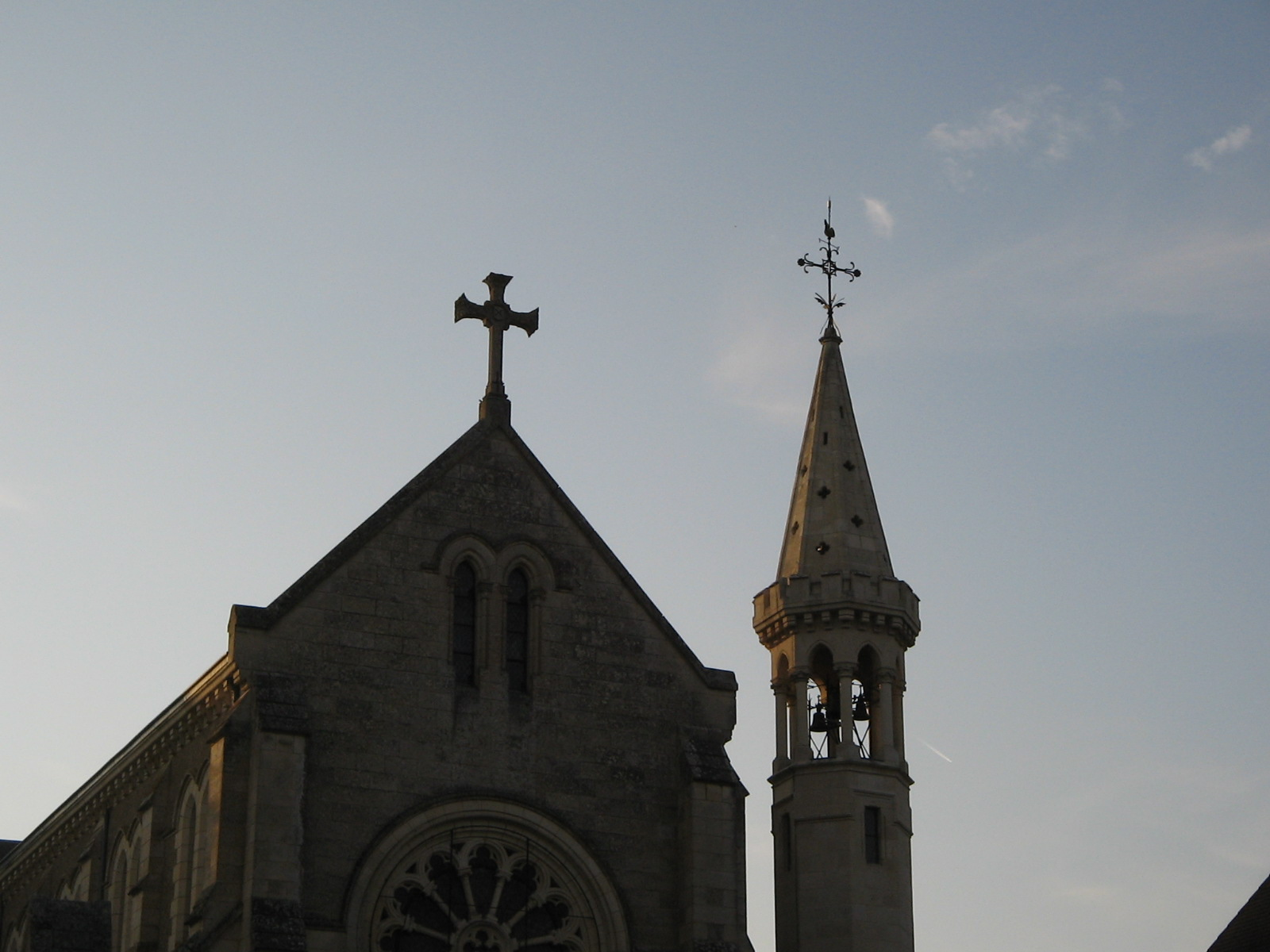
- The Chapel of the Mother House of the Daughters of the Cross, in La Puye
- Location of La Puye
- Location within France Location within Nouvelle-Aquitaine
- Coordinates: 46°38′36″N 0°45′10″E
- Country: France
- Region: Nouvelle-Aquitaine
- Department: Vienne
- Arrondissement: Châtellerault
- Canton: Montmorillon
- Intercommunality: CU Grand Poitiers

Government
  - Mayor (2020–2026): Gérard Benoist
- Area^{1}: 23.57 km^{2} (9.10 sq mi)
- Elevation: 116 m (381 ft)
- Highest elevation: 141 m (463 ft)
- Lowest elevation: 102 m (335 ft)
- Population (2023): 608
  - Density: 25.8/km^{2} (66.8/sq mi)
- Time zone: UTC+01:00 (CET)
  - Summer (DST): UTC+02:00 (CEST)
- INSEE/Postal code: 86202 /86260
- ^{1} French Land Register data, which excludes lakes, ponds, glaciers > 1 km^{2} (0.386 sq mi or 247 acres) and river estuaries.

La Puye (French pronunciation: [la pɥi]) is a commune in the Vienne department in the Nouvelle-Aquitaine region in western France.

== Demographics ==
Historical population
Year	Pop.	±% p.a.
1968	770	—
1975	730	−0.76%
1982	659	−1.45%
1990	599	−1.19%
1999	577	−0.41%
2007	581	+0.09%
2012	602	+0.71%
2017	606	+0.13%
2023	608	+0.05%
Source: INSEE

== See also ==
- Communes of the Vienne department
