= Apostolic Vicariate of the Hawaiian Islands =

The Apostolic Vicariate of the Hawaiian Islands was the jurisdiction of the prelate of the Catholic Church in the Hawaiian Islands, created in 1847 by the Holy See. In 1848, the phrase Sandwich Islands was dropped and replaced by Hawaiian Islands. The first Vicar Apostolic of the Sandwich Islands (and the Hawaiian Islands) was Msgr. Louis-Désiré Maigret, SS.CC. The Vicariate derives from the Prefecture Apostolic of the Sandwich Islands, established in 1825 and which was to become in 1833, a part of the larger territory under the ordinary jurisdiction of the Vicar Apostolic of Oriental Oceania entrusted to the Congregation of the Sacred Hearts of Jesus and Mary.

== See also ==
- Bishop Etienne Jerome Rouchouze, Vicar Apostolic of Oriental Oceania
