= Clarence Richard Silva =

American Catholic bishop (born 1941)

His Excellency, The Most Reverend Clarence Richard Silva
- Bishop Emeritus of Honolulu
- Church: Catholic
- Diocese: Honolulu
- Appointed: May 17, 2005
- Installed: July 21, 2005
- Retired: May 6, 2026
- Predecessor: Francis Xavier DiLorenzo
- Successor: Michael T. Castori

Orders
- Ordination: May 2, 1975 by Floyd Lawrence Begin
- Consecration: July 21, 2005 by William Levada, Allen Henry Vigneron, and John Stephen Cummins

Personal details
- Born: August 6, 1949 (age 77) Honolulu, Hawaii, US
- Education: Saint Joseph College Seminary; Saint Patrick Seminary; Pontifical North American College
- Motto: Witness to Jesus

Styles of Clarence Richard Silva
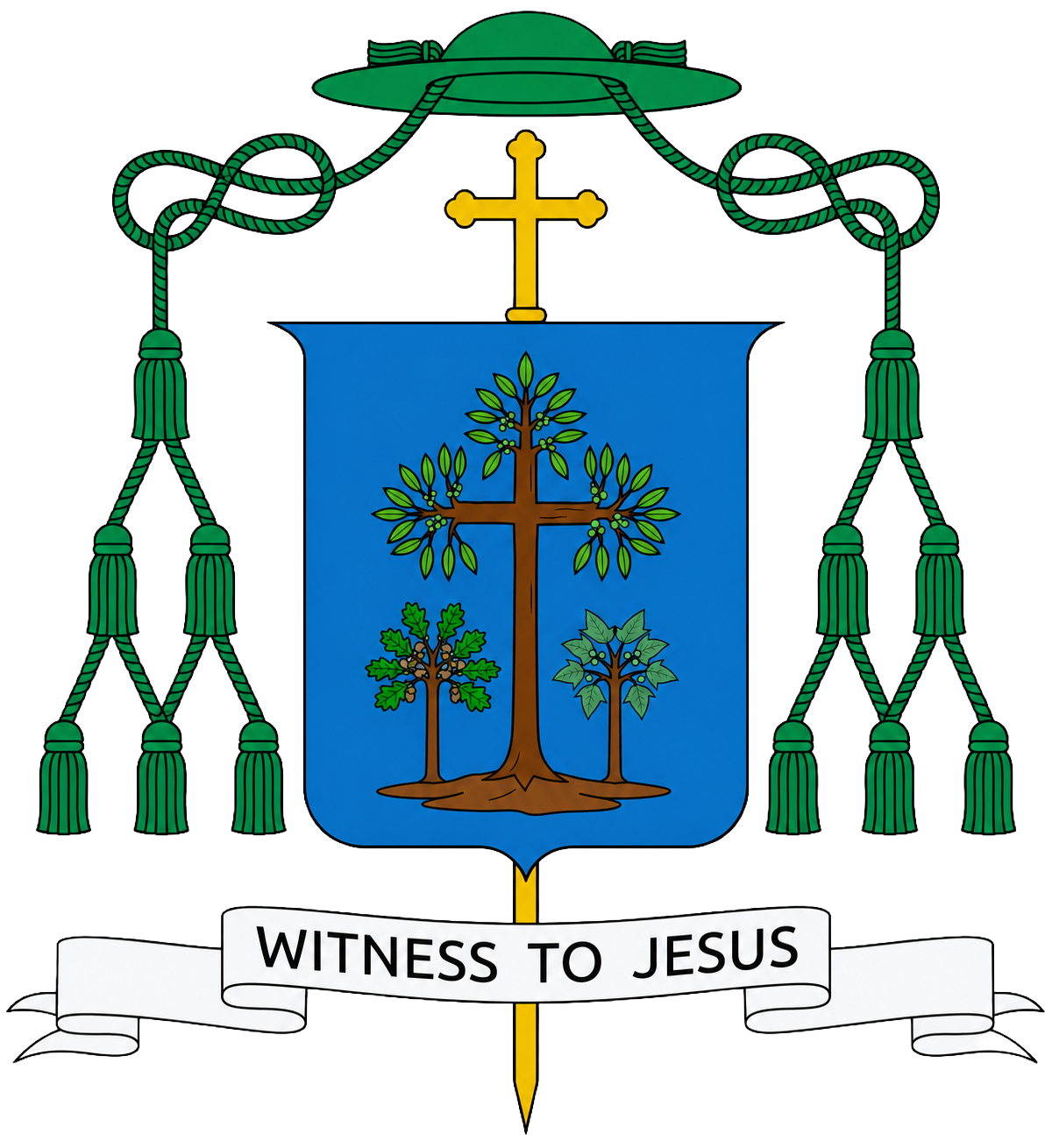
- Reference style: His Excellency; The Most Reverend
- Spoken style: Your Excellency
- Religious style: Bishop

Clarence Richard "Larry" Silva (born August 6, 1949) is an American Catholic prelate who served as Bishop of Honolulu from 2005 to 2026. He is the first Hawaiian-born bishop of Honolulu and the second of Portuguese/Azorean ancestry. Prior to becoming a bishop, Silva served as vicar general of the Diocese of Oakland.

== Biography ==
=== Early life ===
Clarence Silva was born on August 6, 1949, in Honolulu, Hawaii, to Richard and Catherine Alves Silva at Saint Francis Hospital in Liliha. Clarence Silva is the great-grandson of Azorean immigrants to the United States.

Silva was baptized at Saint Anthony Church in Kailua, Hawaii; while he was still an infant, the Silva family moved to California. He attended Saint John the Baptist School in San Lorenzo, California, and Bishop O'Dowd High School in Oakland, California.

Convinced of a calling to the priesthood, Silva entered Saint Joseph College Seminary in Mountain View, California, obtaining a Bachelor of Arts degree. He then attended Saint Patrick Seminary in Menlo Park, California, where he obtained a Master of Divinity degree.

=== Priesthood ===
Silva was ordained a priest for the Diocese of Oakland on May 2, 1975, by Bishop Floyd Begin at the Cathedral of Saint Francis de Sales in Oakland. Silva spent the summer of 1975 studying Spanish in Cuernavaca, Mexico. After returning from Mexico, the diocese assigned Silva as associate pastor in the following California parishes:

- Saint Bernard in Oakland (1975 to 1978). During the summer of 1978, he returned to Cuernavaca for more instruction in Spanish.
- Our Lady of the Rosary in Union City (1978 to 1979). During this period, he also served as vocations director for the diocese.
- Saint Bede in Hayward (1983 to 1984)

Silva was named pastor of Saint Peter Martyr Parish in Pittsburg, California, in 1984. Two years later, he was transferred to Saint Anthony Parish in Oakland to serve as pastor there. During a three-month sabbatical leave in 1991, Silva studied at the Pontifical North American College in Rome. After returning to Oakland, Silva had more pastoral assignments:

- Saint John the Baptist in El Cerrito (1991 to 1994)
- Saint Andrew and Saint Joseph in Oakland (1994 to 1999)
- Saint Leonard and Saint Paula in Fremont (2000 to 2003)

In 2003, Bishop Allen Vigneron appointed Silva as his vicar general and moderator of the curia. Silva was instrumental in the planning for the construction of the Cathedral of Christ the Light. It replaced the Cathedral of Saint Francis de Sales, destroyed in the Loma Prieta earthquake in 1989.

== Episcopal career ==
=== Bishop of Honolulu ===
This is a representation of the coat of arms of Clarence Richard Silva, bishop of the Roman Catholic Diocese of Honolulu.

Pope Benedict XVI appointed Silva on May 17, 2005, as bishop of Honolulu. Silva was consecrated on July 21, 2005, at the Neal S. Blaisdell Center in Honolulu by Archbishop William Levada. The co-consecrators were Vigneron and Bishop John Cummins. Silva's episcopal motto is "Witness to Jesus".

Silva was a principal promoter for the causes of sainthood for Father Damien and Sister Marianne Cope, both of whom cared for leprosy patients on the island of Molokai. Silva traveled to Kalaupapa on Molokai on May 19, 2005, to pay homage to Damien and Cope. Cope had been beatified by Benedict XVI earlier that week.

In April 2020, Silva announced during a Sunday mass that the diocese was paying millions to settle prior sex abuse cases. Silva also acknowledged that the diocese was still facing a large of number of sex abuse lawsuits.

On May 6, 2026, Pope Leo XIV accepted his resignation after reaching the customary retirement age of 75.

== Honors ==
- Order of the Holy Sepulchre in 2005 with the rank of grand officer.
- Sovereign Military Order of Malta in 2013 ceremony at the Cathedral of Our Lady of Peace in Honolulu
- Royal Order of Kamehameha I in 2013 with the rank of knight companion. The citation said that Silva had:
  "...gained the respect and admiration of the High Chiefs, Chief, Officers, Mamo Hawaii and Na Wahine Hui o Kamehameha I for his ecumenical spirit of aloha, kindness sensitivity to our island ways and for his love of the Hawaiian culture and all the cultures for people from around the world who call Hawaii home."

== Coat of arms ==
Silva's episcopal coat-of-arms was designed by Reverend Quang Dong and Thanh Dong. Silva means "forest" in Portuguese. for that reason the coat of arms contain three trees."

- the kukui tree (Aleurites mollucana) on the right symbolizes Hawaii. It yields an oil with healing properties that also provides light
- the oak trees (Quercus alba) on the left symbolize Oakland (Quercopolitana) where Silva grew up and served as a priest
- the cross in the center, known as the tree of life, has olive leaves symbolizing Malia O Ka Malu (Mary, Queen of Peace), patroness of the diocese.

== See also ==
- Catholic Church hierarchy
- Catholic Church in the United States
- Historical list of the Catholic bishops of the United States
- List of Catholic bishops of the United States
- Lists of patriarchs, archbishops, and bishops

== Episcopal succession ==
Catholic Church titles
| Preceded by Francis X. DiLorenzo | Bishop of Honolulu; 2005–2026 | Succeeded by Michael T. Castori |
