= List of churches in the Diocese of Oakland =

This is a list of current and former Roman Catholic churches in the Roman Catholic Diocese of Oakland. The diocese comprises Alameda and Contra Costa Counties in the San Francisco Bay Area. The mother church of the diocese is the Cathedral of Christ the Light in Oakland, California.

== Alameda County ==
Name	Image	Location	Description/Notes
All Saints		22824 Second St, Hayward	
Basilica of St. Joseph		1109 Chestnut St, Alameda	Parish dates to 1885; basilica listed on the National Register of Historic Places in 1978
Cathedral of Christ the Light		2121 Harrison St, Oakland	Cathedral of the Oakland Diocese, dedicated in 2008
Church of the Assumption		1100 Fulton Ave, San Leandro	
Corpus Christi		37891 Second St, Fremont	
Holy Spirit		37588 Fremont Blvd, Fremont	
Holy Spirit - Newman Hall		2700 Dwight Way, Berkeley	Serving the UC Berkeley community
Mary Help of Christians		2611 East 9th St, Oakland	
Old St. Mary's		707 Jefferson St, Oakland	
Our Lady of Good Counsel		2500 Bermuda Place, San Leandro	
Our Lady of Grace		3433 Somerset Ave, Castro Valley	
Our Lady of Guadalupe		41933 Blacow Rd, Fremont	
Our Lady of Lourdes		2808 Lakeshore Ave, Oakland	
Our Lady of the Rosary		703 C Street, Union City	
Sacred Heart		4025 Martin Luther King Jr. Way, Oakland	
St. Albert		1022 Holly St, Alameda	
St. Ambrose		1145 Gilman St, Berkeley	
St. Anne		32223 Cabello St, Union City	
St. Anthony		1535 16th Ave, Oakland	
St. Augustine		400 Alcatraz Ave, Oakland	
St. Augustine		3999 Bernal Ave, Pleasanton	
St. Barnabas		1427 Sixth St, Alameda	
St. Bede		26950 Patrick Ave, Hayward	
St. Benedict		2245 82nd Ave, Oakland	
St. Bernard		1620 62nd Ave, Oakland	
St. Charles Borromeo		1315 Lomitas Ave, Livermore	
St. Clement		738 Calhoun St, Hayward	
St. Columba		6401 San Pablo Ave, Oakland	
St. Edward		5788 Thornton Ave, Newark	
St. Elizabeth		1500 34th Ave, Oakland	
St. Felicitas		1604 Manor Blvd, San Leandro	
St. James		34700 Fremont Blvd, Fremont	
St. James the Apostle		34700 Fremont Dr, Fremont	
St. Jarlath		2620 Pleasant St, Oakland	
St. Joachim		21250 Hesperian Blvd, Hayward	
St. John the Baptist		264 E. Lewelling Blvd, San Lorenzo	
St. Joseph (Old Mission San Jose)		43148 Mission Blvd, Fremont	
St. Joseph Center for Deaf		3880 Smith St, Union City	
St. Joseph the Worker		1640 Addison St, Berkeley	
St. Lawrence O'Toole		3725 High St, Oakland	
St. Leander		550 W. Estudillo Ave, San Leandro	
St. Leo the Great		176 Ridgeway Ave, Oakland	
St. Louis Bertrand		1410 100th Ave, Oakland	
St. Margaret Mary		1219 Excelsior Ave, Oakland	
St. Mary Magdalen		2005 Berryman St, Berkeley	
St. Michael		458 Maple St, Livermore	
St. Paschal Baylon		3700 Dorisa Ave, Oakland	
St. Patrick		1023 Peralta St, Oakland	
St. Raymond		11555 Shannon Ave, Dublin	
Old St. Raymond's		6600 Donlon Way, Dublin	
St. Theresa of the Infant Jesus		30 Mandalay Rd, Oakland	
Transfiguration		4000 E. Castro Valley Blvd, Castro Valley	

== Contra Costa County ==
Name	Image	Location	Description/Notes
Good Shepherd		3200 Harbor Street, Pittsburg	
Immaculate Heart of Mary		813 First St, Brentwood	
Most Holy Rosary		1313 A St, Antioch	
Our Lady Queen of the World		3155 Winterbrook Dr, Pittsburg	
Queen of All Saints		2390 Grant St, Concord	
St. Agnes		3966 Chestnut Ave, Concord	
St. Anne		3959 Holway Dr, Byron	
St. Anne		1600 Rossmoor Parkway, Walnut Creek	
St. Anthony		971 O'Hara Ave, Oakley	
St. Bonaventure		5562 Clayton Rd, Concord	
St. Callistus		3580 San Pablo Dam Rd, El Sobrante	
St. Catherine of Siena		1100 Estudillo St, Martinez	
St. Cornelius		225 28th St, Richmond	
St. David of Wales		5641 Esmond Ave, Richmond	
St. Francis of Assisi		860 Oak Grove Rd, Concord	
St. Ignatius of Antioch		3351 Contra Loma Blvd, Antioch	
St. Isidore		440 La Gonda Way, Danville	
St. Jerome		308 Carmel Ave, El Cerrito	
St. Joan of Arc		2601 San Ramon Valley Blvd, San Ramon	
St. John the Baptist		11150 San Pablo Ave, El Cerrito	
St. John Vianney		1650 Ygnacio Valley Rd, Walnut Creek	
St. Mark		159 Harbour Way, Richmond	
St. Mary		1201 Alpine Rd, Walnut Creek	
St. Monica		1001 Camino Pablo, Moraga	
St. Patrick		825 Seventh St, Rodeo	
St. Paul		1845 Church Lane, San Pablo	
St. Peter Martyr		740 Black Diamond St, Pittsburg	
St. Joseph		2100 Pear St, Pinole	
St. Rose of Lima - St. Patrick Mission		555 Third Ave, Crockett	
Santa Maria		20 Santa Maria Way, Orinda	
