= Michael T. Castori =

American Catholic prelate (born 1960)

His Excellency, The Most Reverend Michael T. Castori SJ
- Bishop of Honolulu
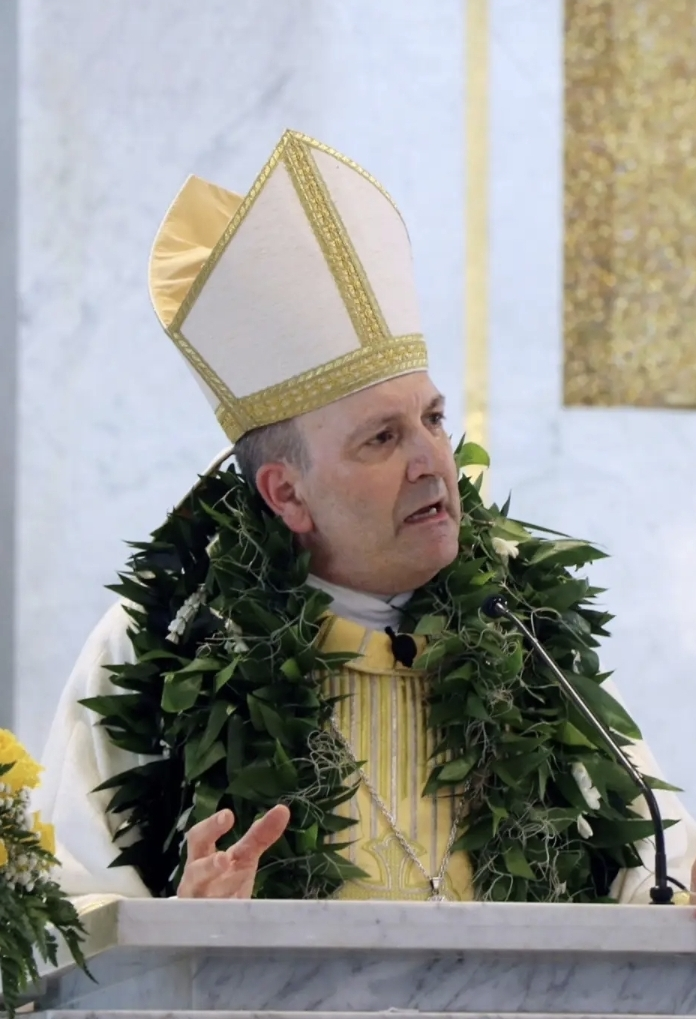
- Church: Catholic Church
- Diocese: Honolulu
- Appointed: May 6, 2026
- Installed: July 28, 2026

Orders
- Ordination: June 13, 1998
- Consecration: July 28, 2026 by Salvatore Cordileone, Clarence Richard Silva and Michael C. Barber

Personal details
- Born: October 21, 1960 (age 66) Sacramento, California, US
- Education: Harvard University; Jesuit School of Theology at Berkeley; University of California, Berkeley; Fordham University
- Motto: E hiki mai Kou aupuni; (Hawaiian for 'Thy kingdom come')
- Styles
- Reference style: His Excellency; The Most Reverend
- Spoken style: Your Excellency
- Religious style: Bishop

Michael Thomas Tupou Castori (born October 21, 1960) is an American Catholic prelate and a member of the Society of Jesus serving as the sixth Bishop of Honolulu since 2026.

== Early life and education ==
Michael Thomas Castori was born on October 21, 1960, in Sacramento, California. He is the son of Michael and Lucille (née Schneider) Castori; he has two older sisters, JoAnn and Pamela. He attended Jesuit High School in the Sacramento suburb of Carmichael, graduating in 1978. He then received a Bachelor's degree in classics from Harvard University in 1982.

As a member of the Jesuit Volunteer Corps, Castori ministered to the homeless in Baltimore (1984–1985) and served as instructor for the Collegiate Program at St. Ignatius House of Studies in Guam (1985–1987). In 1987, he entered the Society of Jesus. While associated with the Jesuits' New York-based East Province, he earned a Master's degree in philosophical resources from Fordham University (1991) and served in Catholic chaplaincies at Crouse-Irving Memorial Hospital in Syracuse (1987–1989) and St. Barnabas Hospital in The Bronx (1989–1991).

Castori then engaged in pastoral ministry in the South Pacific, first serving in a chaplaincy at Suva Prison (1991–1994) and teaching philosophy at Pacific Regional Seminary (1991–1994) in Fiji. He then served at parishes in Nukuʻalofa and Haʻapai in Tonga. He was given the Tongan name Tupou by a family during his time in the region. He later studied at the Jesuit School of Theology at Berkeley, receiving a Master of Divinity in 1998.

== Priesthood ==
Castori was ordained to the priesthood on June 13, 1998. The following year, he studied Hebrew languages at the Hebrew University of Jerusalem. He later received a PhD in Near Eastern religions from the University of California, Berkeley (2008) and a Licentiate of Sacred Theology from Fordham University (2009).

From 2008 to 2013, Castori served in campus ministry and as an assistant professor in the department of religious studies at Santa Clara University. He then served as associate pastor at All Saints Church in Hayward (2014–2024) and vicar for clergy for the Diocese of Oakland (2021–2025). In 2025, he became rector of the Arrupe Jesuit Residence at Seattle University.

== Episcopal career ==
On May 6, 2026, Castori was appointed to succeed Larry Silva as the sixth Bishop of Honolulu by Pope Leo XIV. He received his episcopal consecration on the following July 28 at the Co-Cathedral of Saint Theresa of the Child Jesus from Archbishop Salvatore Cordileone, with Bishops Silva and Michael C. Barber serving as co-consecrators.

== Coat of arms ==
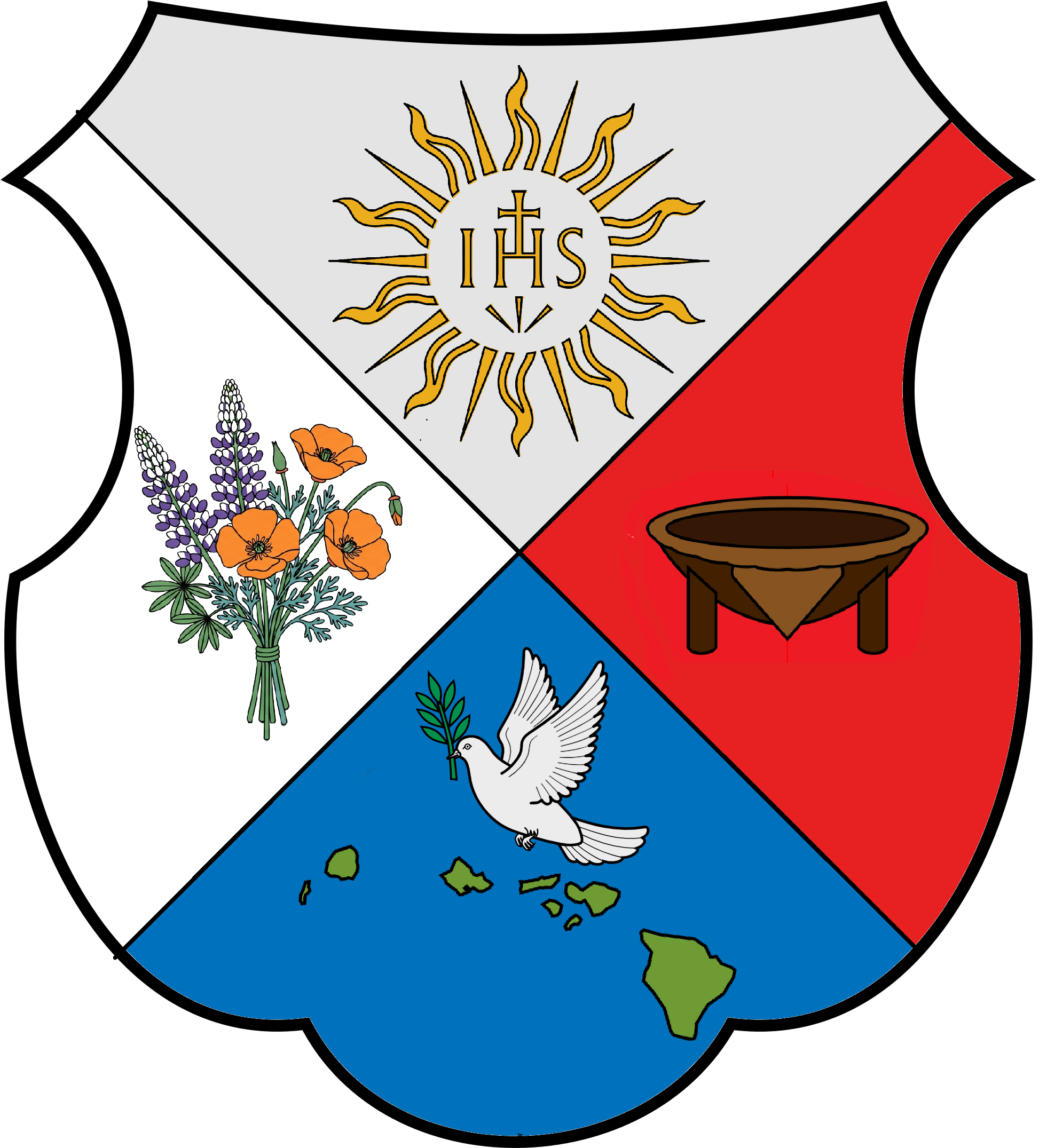
This is a representation of the personal blazon depicted on the coat of arms of Bishop Michael Castori, 6th Bishop of the Roman Catholic Diocese of Honolulu.

Castori's episcopal coat-of-arms was designed by his sister, Pamela Castori.

- The upper quadrant of Castori’s shield displays the seal of the Society of Jesus (“the Jesuits”), the religious congregation to which he belongs.
- The Hawaiian Islands which comprise the Diocese of Honolulu and the white dove hovering representing the Diocese’s patroness, Our Lady of Peace,
- The golden poppies and blue lupines evoke Castori’s home and native state of California.
- Castori’s former home Fasi-moe-afiʻa Tungi, Tonga, is represented by the kumete – the large wooden bowl out of which is served kava, the ceremonial drink central to Tongan culture. Red is the national color of Tonga and, in Church heraldry, symbolizes the redeeming blood of Christ.

== See also ==
- Catholic Church hierarchy
- Catholic Church in the United States
- Historical list of the Catholic bishops of the United States
- List of Catholic bishops of the United States
- Lists of patriarchs, archbishops, and bishops

== Episcopal succession ==
Catholic Church titles
Preceded by Clarence Richard Silva	Bishop of Honolulu; 2026-present	Succeeded by Incumbent
