= Cathedral of Saint Francis de Sales (Oakland, California) =

Coordinates: 37.811039°N 122.272747°W

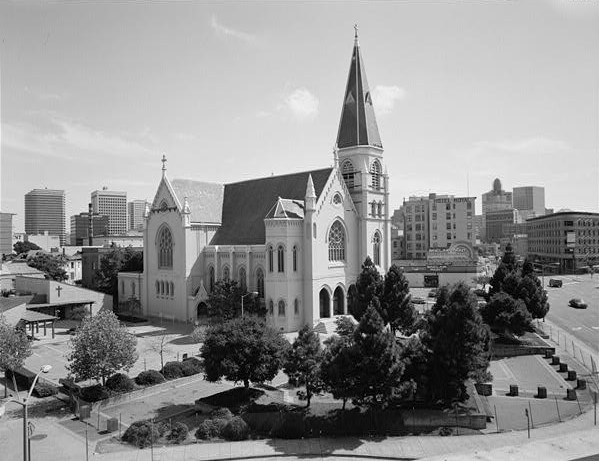
- Cathedral of Saint Francis de Sales
- Location: Oakland, California
- Country: United States
- Denomination: Roman Catholic

History
- Founded: 1886
- Dedication: July 9, 1893

Architecture
- Style: Gothic Revival
- Completed: 1893
- Closed: 1989
- Demolished: 1993

Specifications
- Materials: Brick

Administration
- Diocese: Oakland

Cathedral of Saint Francis de Sales in Oakland was an 1893 church, which served as the cathedral of the Roman Catholic Diocese of Oakland in Oakland, California, from 1962 until it was damaged in the 1989 Loma Prieta earthquake.

== Origins ==
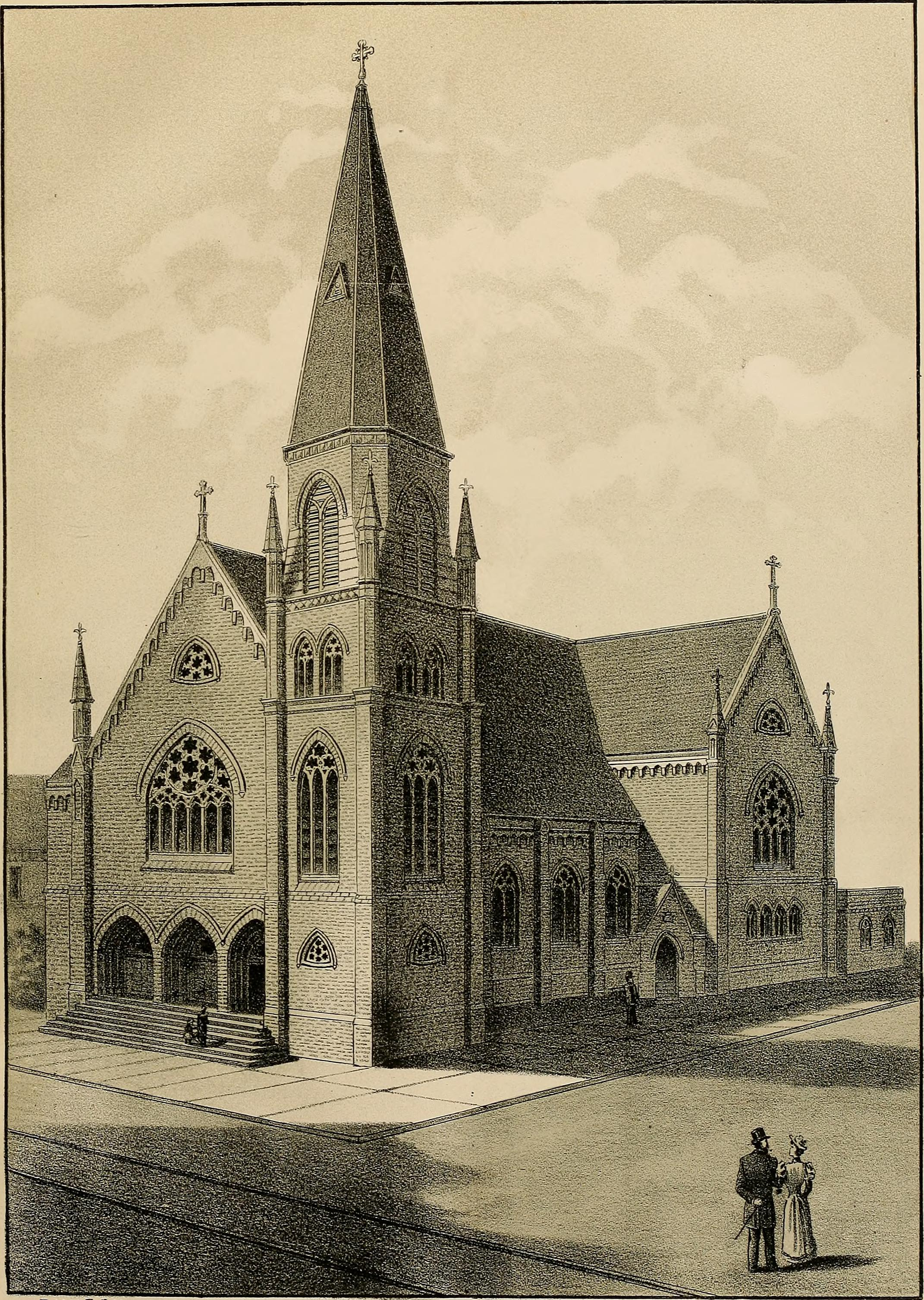
Etching of church, 1893

San Francisco Archbishop Joseph S. Alemany erected St. Mary's of the Immaculate Conception in Oakland in 1853. As Oakland expanded, the archbishop founded in 1871, St. Anthony's in Brooklyn (East Oakland), in 1876, Sacred Heart in Temescal (North Oakland) and in 1879, St. Patrick's in West Oakland. As the population grew in central Oakland, the need arose for a parish between St. Mary's at 7th and Jefferson Streets and Sacred Heart at 40th and Grove Streets.

The new archbishop, Patrick W. Riordan, discussed founding a new parish in Oakland with the pastors of St. Mary's - Father Michael A. King, Sacred Heart - Father Lawrence Serda, St. Patrick's - Father John B. Mc Nally and St. Anthony's - Father William Gleeson, in late 1885. The archbishop picked January 29, 1886, the feast of bishop and doctor, St. Francis de Sales, (1567–1622) to erect the new parish. Father King suggested his able assistant, Father Thomas Mc Sweeney as the founding pastor, Archbishop Riordan made the appointment February 6, 1886. Father Mc Sweeney said the first Mass, of St. Francis de Sales Parish on February 21, 1886, in Hanifin's Hall at San Pablo Avenue and 19th Street. The first baptism recorded at St. Francis de Sales, March 21, 1886.

Father Mc Sweeney with the approval of Archbishop Riordan acquired property on Grove Street between Hobart and 21st Streets. The practical decision, delay a permanent church. A temporary building, constructed, the church upstairs with a ground floor, school. Archbishop Riordan blessed the new St. Francis de Sales Church/School on February 27, 1887.

St. Francis de Sales School opened July 18, 1887, an elementary school for boys and girls and a girls high school. The Sisters of the Holy Names staffed the schools. St. Francis de Sales Girls High School closed May 31, 1931. After ninety years, St. Francis de Sales Grammar School closed June 10, 1977.

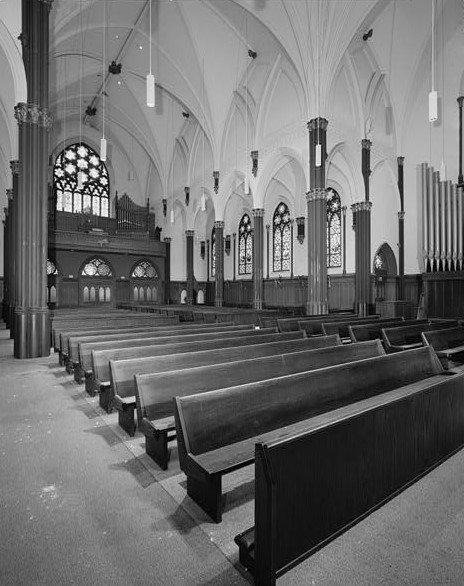
The nave looking toward the gallery.

Father Mc Sweeney had a predominantly Irish congregation. He sought about $15,000 to build a modest church. Mrs. Mary J. Canning (1830–1904) and her husband, James (1810–1892) would allow Mc Sweeney to build a grand church. Their first donation was $75,000. Mrs. Canning would donate $142,000 to build the church. Archbishop Riordan laid the cornerstone of the permanent church September 13, 1891. The structure was designed in a Norman Gothic Revival style, made of red brick, with a steeple and stained glass windows. The architecture, Charles Devlin's work on St. Francis de Sales, impressed Archbishop Riordan. Devlin was awarded the task to design St. Patrick's Seminary in Menlo Park, California.

St. Francis de Sales Church was dedicated by Archbishop Francesco Satolli, the Apostolic Delegate to the United States on July 9, 1893. Cardinal Satolli gave personal greetings from Pope Leo XIII to Mary J. Canning for her financial support in building St. Francis de Sales.

Father Mc Sweeney led St. Francis de Sales for twenty-three years, his health broke with a series of strokes in 1909. Archbishop Edward Joseph Hanna appointed Father Patrick Joseph James Keane, Administrator of St. Francis de Sales in 1910. Father Mc Sweeney departed Oakland, for an extended rest in his native Ireland. Father Mc Sweeney never returned, dying July 28, 1915. Archbishop Hanna made Father Keane, second pastor of St. Francis de Sales. In 1920, Pope Benedict XV selected Father Keane to be Auxiliary Bishop of Sacramento. March 17, 1922, Pope Pius XI appointed Keane Bishop of the Diocese of Sacramento. He died in Sacramento, September 1, 1928.

St. Francis de Sales had four pastors in the 1920s, Father Francis X. Morrison appointed in 1920, died September 18, 1924. The new pastor Father Edward Dempsey, formerly pastor of St. Mary's in Oakland. Father Dempsey led a group of pilgrims to Rome. On May 24, 1924, the small group from St. Francis de Sales met Pope Pius XI, who gave Father Dempsey the honor of Domestic Prelate. Dempsey died January 21, 1928.

Archbishop John J. Mitty appointed Monsignor Joseph M. Gleason fifth pastor of St. Francis de Sales. Gleason was appointed Domestic Prelate by Pope Benedict XV in 1919. Gleason, native San Franciscan, historian, raconteur, member of the Native Sons of the Golden West, on the faculty of Holy Names University, former Army chaplain during the Spanish–American War, boyhood chum of San Francisco Mayor James Rolph, later governor of California. Gleason's closest friends at St. Francis de Sales were Joseph R. Knowland, former US Congressman and Owner of the Oakland Tribune and Herbert Eugene Bolton, historian and professor at the University of California, Berkeley. Monsignor Gleason died on October 30, 1942.

Archbishop Mitty appointed Father Richard A. O'Donnell, native of St. Francis de Sales Parish. O'Donnell had been an Altar Boy to Father McSweeney, a graduate of St. Francis de Sales Grammar School. In 1914 O'Donnell entered St. Patrick's Seminary, and was ordained on June 24, 1920. Pope Pius XII on May 25, 1947, made Father O'Donnell a Domestic Prelate.

== Diocese of Oakland ==
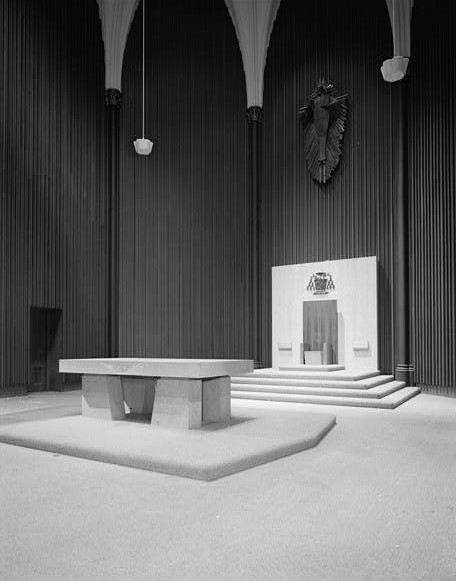
Altar and cathedra

San Francisco Archbishop John J. Mitty, died October 15, 1961. Pope John XXIII established the Diocese of Oakland on January 13, 1962. February 21, 1962, Pope John named Floyd Lawrence Begin, the Auxiliary Bishop of Cleveland, Ohio, first Bishop of Oakland. Bishop Begin, asked at his installation, April 28, 1962, by the Apostolic Delegate to the United States, Egidio Vagnozzi, "when you build a cathedral," the new bishop replied, "I will pick an existing church, in Oakland" St. Francis de Sales Church was designated by Bishop Begin as the Diocese of Oakland's cathedral. After the changes of Vatican II, the structure underwent extensive renovations, which included painting the red brick white and removing the altar rail. In 1968, Msgr. O'Donnell became the first pastor of St. Francis de Sales Church to retire. He died, May 23, 1971.

February 4, 1967, Bishop Begin presided over St. Francis de Sales rededication.

The musical program at St. Francis de Sales achieved acclaim in the 1970s and 1980s. Local newspapers referred to the "Oakland Cathedral Sound," which earned a national reputation. Contributing to the musical program was a Schoenstein pipe organ, installed in 1982.

Bishop Floyd Begin died April 26, 1977, he was buried in a bishop's crypt at Holy Sepulchre Cemetery in Hayward, not the cathedral. Bishop John Cummins was installed at the Oakland Auditorium on June 30, 1977, not St. Francis de Sales Cathedral.

The cathedral suffered extensive damage October 17, 1989, in the Loma Prieta earthquake. One year later, Bishop Cummins announced that the structure would have to be torn down because the diocese could not afford the repairs, and in 1993 the cathedral was demolished. The estimated cost of repairing and performing seismic upgrades of both St. Frances de Sales and the Sacred Heart Church, also damaged in the earthquake, was $8 million.

A new cathedral, called Cathedral of Christ the Light, was built on another site at an estimated cost of $131 million. Christ the Light was consecrated and dedicated by Bishop Allen Vigneron on September 25, 2008.

== Rectors of St. Francis de Sales Cathedral ==
Monsignor Richard A. O'Donnell, 1962–1968
Monsignor Michael H. Lucid, 1968–1971
Monsignor Joseph Skillin, 1971–1973
Father Robert Fontaine, 1973–1975
Father E. Donald Osuna, 1975–1986
Father James T. Keeley, 1986–1993

== See also ==
- List of Catholic cathedrals in the United States
- List of cathedrals in the United States
- Francis de Sales
