= Basilica of St. Joseph, Alameda =

Historic church in California, United States

- St. Joseph's Basilica
- U.S. National Register of Historic Places
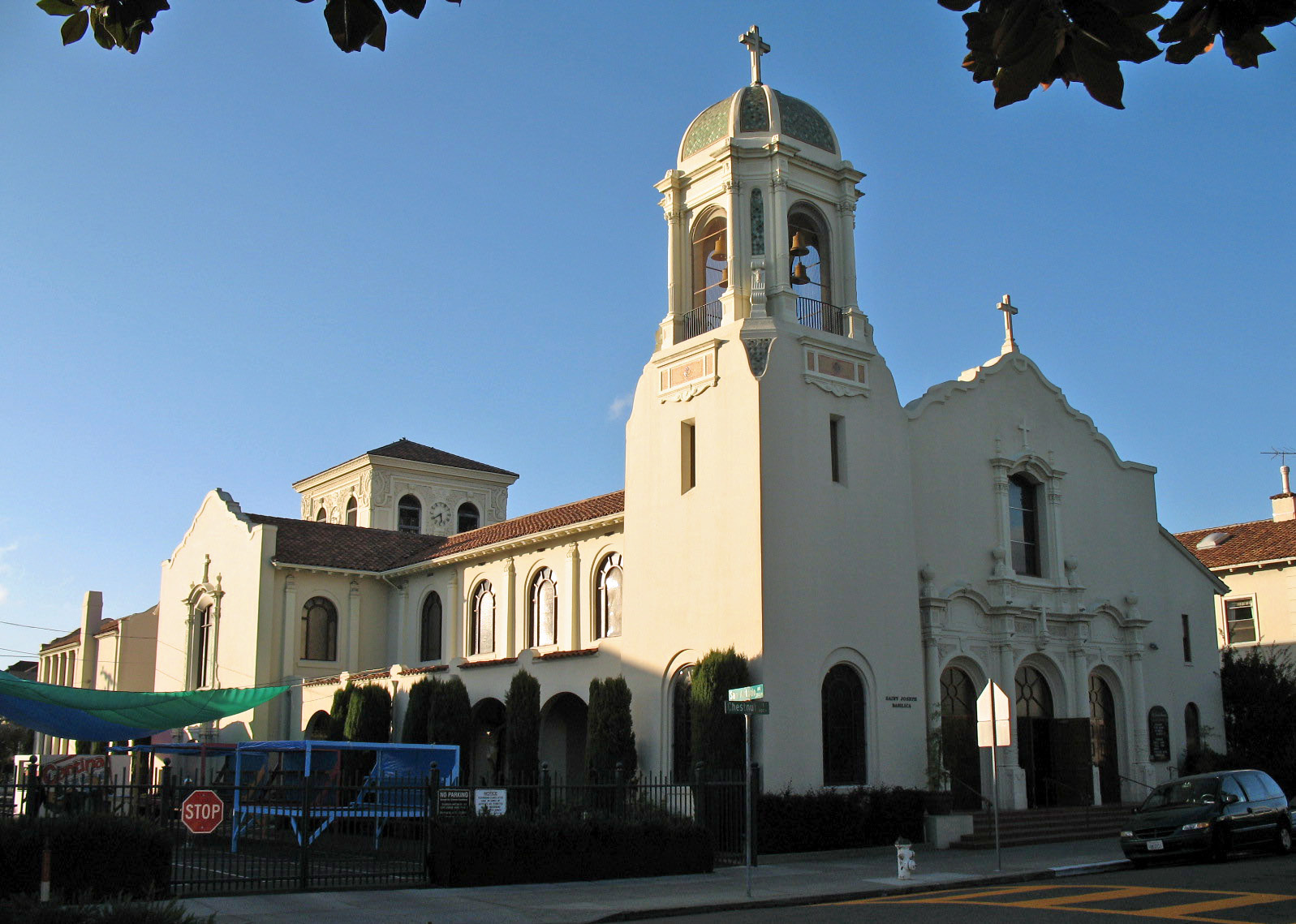

- Location within Oakland, California Location within California Location within the United States
- Location: 1109 Chestnut St., Alameda, California
- Coordinates: 37°45′59″N 122°15′13″W
- Area: 0.4 acres (0.16 ha)
- Built: 1921
- Architect: H.A. Minton
- Architectural style: Mission/Spanish Revival
- NRHP reference No.: 78000642
- Added to NRHP: September 18, 1978

The Basilica of St. Joseph is a Roman Catholic church located in Alameda, California. Its history dates back to early settlement of the City of Alameda, California. A former mission church of St. Anthony's in Oakland, the parish of St. Joseph's was established in 1885. It is part of the Diocese of Oakland. The Basilica was added to the National Register of Historic Places on September 18, 1978.

== Origins ==
The foundation of St. Joseph's can be traced to a Catholic mission in Alameda, created in 1873 by San Francisco Archbishop Jose Sadoc Alemany to serve the growing Roman Catholic population. Land for the mission church, on the southeast corner of Santa Clara Avenue and Chestnut Street had been donated by Mr. Minturn, a non-Catholic, and the first Catholic church in Alameda was built. The mission church built in 1873, was used as a place of worship for over twenty years. The mission was served by Father William Gleeson and the priests of St. Anthony's Church in Oakland. each Sunday Fr. Gleeson would ride horseback (or come on foot) to Alameda each Sunday to offer Mass and teach Catechism.

With a growing congregation, Fr. Gleeson was assisted by Fr. J. B. McNally. Twice in a period of seven years the church was enlarged. Finally in 1881 a new church was built on the southwest corner of Chestnut Street and San Antonio Avenue. Fr. Gleeson had chosen this site for the convenience of the Sisters of Notre Dame de Namur who had just built a girls' school on the adjoining lot. Notre Dame Academy taught girls in grades one through twelve.

== Parish ==
Father Michael McNaboe served ten years as pastor of St. Alphonsus in Suisun, when in 1882, Archbishop Alemany recalled McNaboe from rural Solano County to San Francisco. Father McNaboe in 1885 was instructed by the new archbishop Patrick William Riordan to establish in Alameda, St. Joseph's Parish. The original parish boundaries were the City of Alameda. McNaboe died on March 1, 1892.

Archbishop Riordan appointed Father John J. Sullivan, the pastor of the Old Saint Mary's Cathedral of the Immaculate Conception in San Francisco, to be the second pastor of St. Joseph's. Sullivan at once saw the need for a larger church. The laying of the cornerstone was August 12, 1894; Archbishop Riordan dedicated the gothic wooden church, January 20, 1895. Sullivan became ill and resigned as pastor of St. Joseph's in January 1898; Riordan appointed Father Patrick A. Foley, the pastor of All Hallows in San Francisco, in his place. After fifteen years in Alameda, Foley was appointed pastor of St. Raphael's Church in San Rafael, California.

Riordan appointed Father James Bernard Praught as pastor of St. Joseph's Church in Rio Vista in 1906, followed in 1913 by appointment as pastor of St. Joseph's Parish in Alameda. Praught founded the St. Joseph Elementary School for boys and girls in 1916; the grammar school was completed in 1922.

The old wooden St. Joseph Church burned to the ground on the night of September 29, 1919. A new Church in the Spanish Colonial Revival Style, copied from the old mission in Monterey, was built.

Archbishop Hanna divided the Island City with the creation in 1925 of two parishes, St. Phillip Neri, (East End) Father Maurice O'Keefe, pastor and St. Barnabas (West End) Father Patrick McGrattan, pastor. St. Phillip Neri, identified with the affluent and stable Fernside District. St. Barnabas, the transient military families stationed at NAS (Naval Air Station Alameda). St. Joseph continued to serve central Alameda. Children from the Alameda Catholic elementary schools of St. Joseph, St. Phillip Neri and St. Barnabas would attend St. Joseph Boys High School and Notre Dame Girls High School. In 1976 Bishop Begin erected St. Albert The Great Parish, built on former asparagus farm land, near the new "Harbor Bay Isle" subdivisions.

Father Praught placed a Plaque on the Saint Joseph Tower: TIME GOD's sublime GIFT! LIFE of the SOUL! Ours in trust to enoble [sic] WORK: glorify TRUTH: constantly Pray: LIGHT! O GOD! MORE LIGHT! In memory Anna Marie Broderick A.D. 1928.

On August 17, 1935, San Francisco Archbishop John J. Mitty presided over the consecration of the altar and church of St. Joseph's. It was one of the few churches consecrated in the Archdiocese of San Francisco. In 1943, after thirty years at St. Joseph's Parish. Praught retired and was succeeded by Father Robert J. O'Connor (pastor of St. Phillip Neri, in Alameda - since 1928). Praught became Pastor Emeritus until his death in 1949. O'Connor died in 1957.

Father Alvin P. Wagner, former pastor of St. Francis of Assisi in San Francisco, was appointed pastor of St. Joseph's. On September 8, 1962, Pope John XXIII honored Father Wagner as a Monsignor; he was formally installed as a Domestic Prelate by Bishop Begin. That same year, the Diocese of Oakland was created from the Archdiocese of San Francisco and St. Joseph's became part of the Oakland diocese. Monsignor Wagner retired in 1983 and it was then that the Congregation of the Sacred Hearts of Jesus and Mary (SSCC) was asked by the Oakland Diocese to staff St. Joseph. In 2007, the Congregation of the Sacred Hearts of Jesus and Mary decided to leave Saint Joseph's Community. Oakland Bishop Allen Vigneron returned the parish to the diocesan priests.

== St. Joseph Basilica ==
The new church was designed by Massachusetts architect H.A. Minton, who had come west to help rebuild San Francisco after the 1906 earthquake. The cornerstone was set on August 22, 1920, by San Francisco Archbishop Edward Joseph Hanna. The church contained a bell donated by the Knights of Columbus, which had been fashioned from metal from the bell from the previous church decoyed by fire in 1919. The first Mass in the new church took place on December 25, 1921.

In the spring of 1972, St. Joseph's Church was elevated to the rank of a minor Basilica by Pope Paul VI, making it one of four basilicas in the western United States, including Missions in San Francisco, Monterey, and San Diego. The Pope gave the basilica the right of the conopaeum (a baldachin resembling an umbrella, called an umbraculum, in yellow and red silk, the colors associated with the Papal See) and the bell (tintinnabulum) carried side by side in procession at the head of the clergy.

The basilica has a Schoenstein organ. The basilica was added to the National Register in 1978.

== Pastors ==
- Father William Gleeson (1829-1903), Mission of St. Anthony, Oakland, (1873-1885)
- Father Michael McNaboe (1843-1892), 1885–1892, Parish erected May 1885
- Father John J. Sullivan (1857-1920), 1892-1898
- Father Patrick A. Foley (1853-1923), 1898-1913
- Father J. Bernard Praught (1866-1949), 1913-1943
- Father Robert J. O'Connor (1887-1957), 1943-1957
- Monsignor Alvin P. Wagner (1907-1989), 1957-1983
- Father Patrick A. Goodwin, SSCC, 1983-1993
- Father Jeremiah Holland, SSCC, 1993-2001
- Father Richard Danyluk, SSCC, 2001-2007
- Father Anthony Herrera, 2007-2008
- Father Ray Zielezienski, 2008-2008
- Father Fred Riccio, 2008-2013
- Father George Alengadan, 2013-2019
- Father Mario Rizzo, Parochial Administrator, 2020-

== Schools ==
While still under "mission status," on March 27, 1881, Sister Marie de Sacre Coeur and four Sisters of Notre Dame de Namur started the Notre Dame Academy for Young Ladies. In 1887 Fr. McNaboe requested the Sisters of Notre Dame de Namur to staff a boys elementary school. In 1922 a new co-ed grammar school was donated to the parish by Theresa Ettinger in memory of her husband, the late Victor Ettinger. Fr. J. Bernard Praught, the pastor of St. Joseph Church, became the first principal of the new school. The last of the Sisters to minister in the elementary school, Sister Agnes Anzoli, left in the 1990s. As of 2015, the school had an enrollment of about 270 in grades kindergarten through eighth.

In 1922, Notre Dame Academy was renamed Notre Dame Girls High School. In 1960 the old girls high school was razed, and Notre Dame Girls High School and Notre Dame Sisters Convent were built.

In 1935, Praught asked Father Joseph Tetzlaff of the (Marianists), Brothers of Mary to set up a Boys High School in Alameda. St Joseph Boys High School opened August 26, 1935, with Brother Matthew Betz, S.M. as principal. St. Joseph's drew students from Oakland, San Leandro and Berkeley. At the conclusion of the 1970 academic year the Brothers of Mary departed St. Joseph Boys High School and Msgr. Wagner sought a teaching order to replace the departing brothers.

St. Joseph Boys High School and Notre Dame Girls High School merged in 1983. St. Joseph Notre Dame High School is accredited by the Western Association of Schools and Colleges, and by the Western Catholic Educational Association.

== Sources ==
- Wagner, Alvin P. Saint Joseph of Alameda Diamond Jubilee Souvenir Book, 1960.
- Diocese of Oakland, 2009 Catholic Directory, Published by the Catholic Voice, Oakland, California.
- 1970 Catholic Directory, Archdiocese of San Francisco, Published by The Monitor, San Francisco, California.
- Burns, Jeffrey M. and Batiza, Mary C. We Are The Church: The History Of The Diocese Of Oakland 2001, Published by the Diocese of Oakland, Oakland, California.
