= Alemany =

Alemany is a Catalan surname with the meaning of German. Notable people with the surname include:

- Arnau Alemany (1948–2000), Spanish painter
- Ellen Alemany (born 1955), American banker
- Iván Alemany (born 1967), Spanish cyclist
- Jacqueline Alemany (born 1989), American journalist
- José Ignacio Alemany Grau (born 1934), Spanish-born Peruvian Roman Catholic bishop
- Joseph Sadoc Alemany (1814–1888), Spanish Roman Catholic archbishop
- Juan Francisco Alemany (born 1963), Spanish handball player
