= Arnau Alemany =

Catalan painter (1948–2020)

Arnau Alemany (Catalan pronunciation: Əřn'àu Ələm'àŋ; 1948 – 2020) was a Catalan painter. His style is magical realism or surrealism. He studied at Conservatori d’arts sumptuàries and later he graduated in Massana Art School in Barcelona. His influences are René Magritte, Balthus and Pierre Roy. In 1991 he won the Biennal d’Art of Montecarlo second prize. His first exhibitions were in Catalonia (Galeria Serrallonga, Sala Parés, galleries of Girona, etc.) and later he presented his paintings in València, London, Paris, Lyon, Madrid, Napa Valley-CA, New York, Miami, Los Angeles, Chicago, Japan (Marugame Hirai Museum). His original works are painted in oil on panel painting, though he has also produced an extensive collection of hand-signed and numbered lithographs. He painted social buildings from Paris, Barcelona or New York in desert landscapes and desolate abandonment, ghost towns, industrialised cities, where nature consumes the streets and buildings.
