= Cathedral of Christ the Light (Oakland, California) =

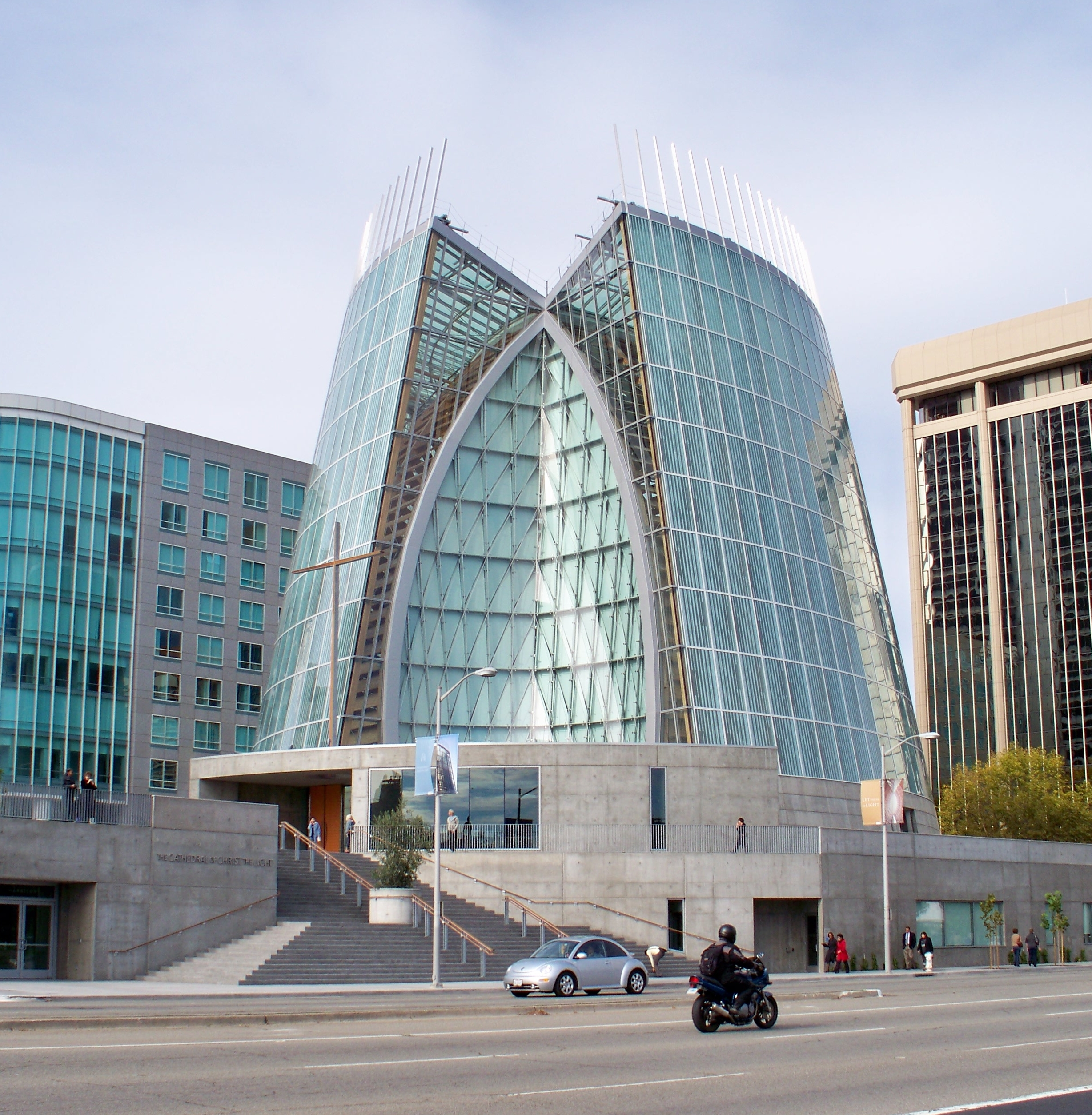
- Exterior view of The Cathedral of Christ the Light

- Location in California Cathedral of Christ the Light (California) Cathedral of Christ the Light (the United States)
- 37°48′38″N 122°15′47″W
- Location: 2121 Harrison St. Oakland, California
- Country: United States
- Denomination: Roman Catholic
- Website: www.ctlcathedral.org

History
- Dedication: September 25, 2008

Architecture
- Architect(s): Craig W. Hartman; Skidmore, Owings & Merrill; Tom Milholland; Aryan Sarkar; Kendall/Heaton Associates
- Architectural type: Modern architecture Late 20th century abstract
- Groundbreaking: 2005
- Completed: 2008

Specifications
- Capacity: 1,800
- Materials: ceramic frit, concrete, Douglas fir, glass frit, steel

Administration
- Diocese: Diocese of Oakland

Clergy
- Bishop(s): Michael C. Barber, SJ
- Rector: Erick Villa

The Cathedral of Christ the Light, also called Oakland Cathedral, is the cathedral of the Roman Catholic Diocese of Oakland in Oakland, California. It is the seat of the Bishop of Oakland. Christ the Light was the first cathedral built entirely in the 21st century and replaced the Cathedral of Saint Francis de Sales, irreparably damaged in the Loma Prieta earthquake of 1989.

The Cathedral of Christ the Light Complex, as a larger cathedral center, is composed of the cathedral church, the chancery office of the bishop's curia, a conference center, rectory (priests' residence), Order of Malta Northern California Health Clinic (which provides free diagnostic services to people without health insurance), and a mausoleum. The mausoleum features twelve crypts reserved for the bishops of Oakland and burial sites available to the members of the diocese for a comparable price to the other Catholic cemeteries in the diocese. The cathedral center also houses City Lights Cafe and the Cathedral Shop, as well as a public plaza and garden.

The Cathedral of Christ the Light was designed by architect Craig W. Hartman, of Skidmore, Owings & Merrill. The Catholic Cathedral Corporation of the East Bay, the incorporated owner of the cathedral, chose Webcor Builders as the general contractor of cathedral construction.

Originally planned in 2000 under the direction of Bishop John Stephen Cummins and finally breaking ground on May 21, 2005, Christ the Light was consecrated and dedicated by Bishop Allen Henry Vigneron on September 25, 2008. On All Souls' Day November 2, the mausoleum was dedicated and the first Bishop of Oakland, Floyd Lawrence Begin, was reburied in one of its crypts.

Located at 2121 Harrison Street in Oakland, the cathedral serves as the mother church of approximately 530,000 Catholics in the counties of Alameda and Contra Costa.

== Design ==
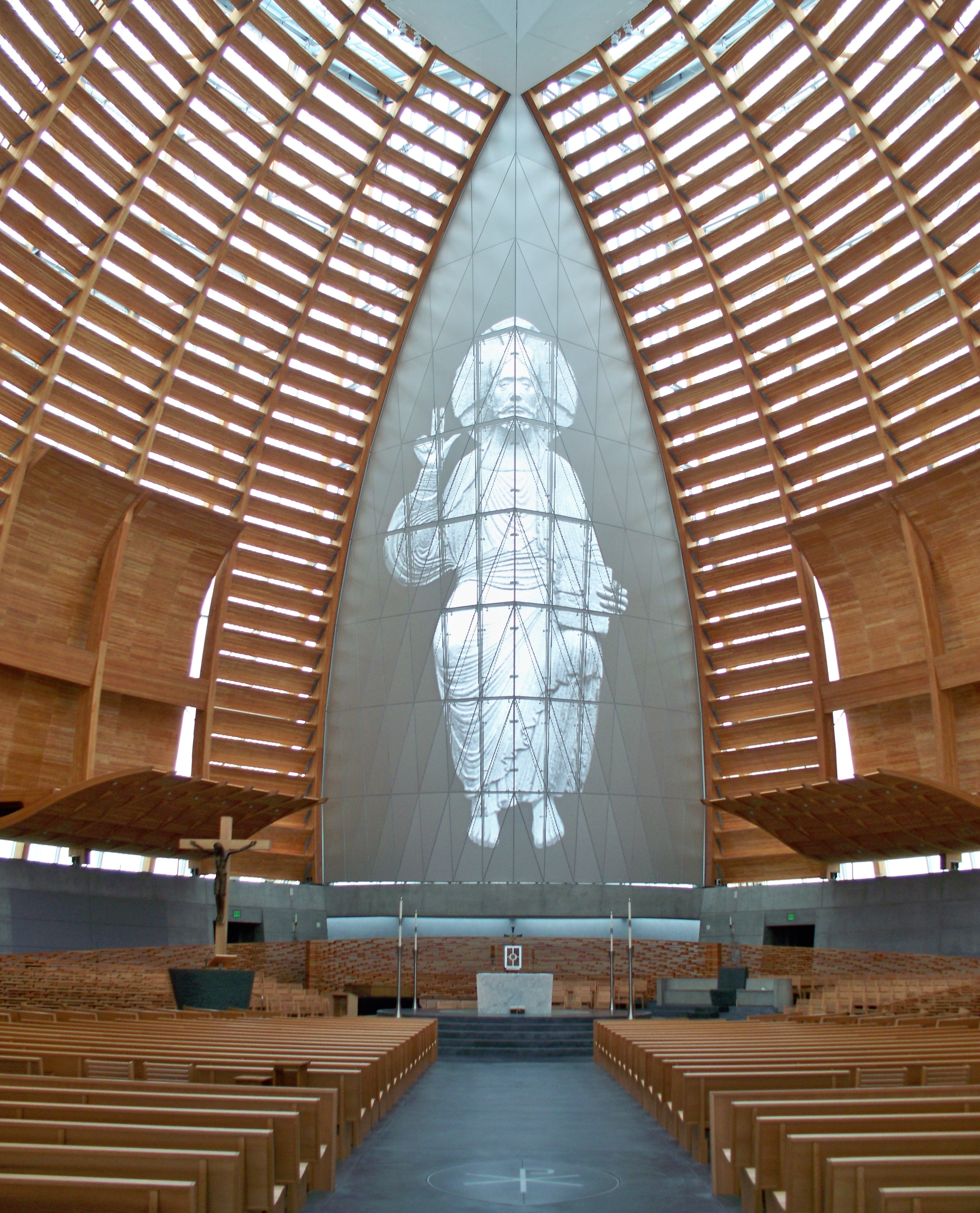
Cathedral interior

The Catholic Cathedral Corporation of the East Bay instituted a design competition for Christ the Light. Various designs were judged and the corporation announced Santiago Calatrava, of Valencia, Spain as the winner. He designed the post–September 11 World Trade Center Port Authority Trans-Hudson station in New York City. Calatrava's design for The Cathedral of Christ the Light was chosen before a site was appropriated for the project.

By the time a site was chosen, a parking lot formerly dedicated to the construction of the tallest building in Oakland, Calatrava's design fell out of favor and was instead replaced by a design of competition runner-up Craig W. Hartman of Skidmore, Owings & Merrill offices in San Francisco.

Hartman, designer of the international terminal at San Francisco International Airport, created a 20th-century abstract building from the family of styles developed by architects like Ludwig Mies van der Rohe, famous for creating steel shapes filled with glass. Hartman's vision for The Cathedral of Christ the Light was likened to the image of a bishop's mitre, shaped by steel and filled with glass frit.

The worship space in The Cathedral of Christ the Light is a vesica piscis shape (translated into English means fish bladder), the shape formed by the intersection of two circles, with yonic imagery. The walls are composed of overlapping panels of wood and glass rising skyward to form the vault, much like the scales of a fish. The design is inspired by the miracle of the loaves and the fishes in Christian tradition, among other motifs. The Oakland Tribune wrote of the Hartman's description of light, "The design allows light to filter in, reminiscent of how light filters through a canopy of tall redwood trees in a wooded glade, Hartman said". The 58 feet high omega window contains a three-dimensional depiction of Jesus Christ, created with holes pierced into the window's aluminum panels, based on a 12th-century tympanum sculpture on the Royal Portal of Chartres Cathedral.

Like the Cathedral of Our Lady of the Angels which serves the Archdiocese of Los Angeles, The Cathedral of Christ the Light is built with protective measures against earthquake damage.

The triptych in the Chapel of All Saints, painted by Brother William J Woeger, FSC, is entitled “Protector of the Church”. St. Joseph is shown holding Mission San José, where Mass was first celebrated in the area of the current Diocese of Oakland.

A small garden on The Cathedral of Christ the Light's grounds is intended to serve as a place of healing for survivors of clergy sexual abuse. Designed by a Survivors' Group in collaboration with the Oakland Diocese and famed architect Dr. Aryan Sarkar, the garden features a basalt sculpture and a plaque inscribed "This healing garden, planned by survivors, is dedicated to those innocents sexually abused by members of the clergy. We remember, and we affirm: never again."

== Organ ==
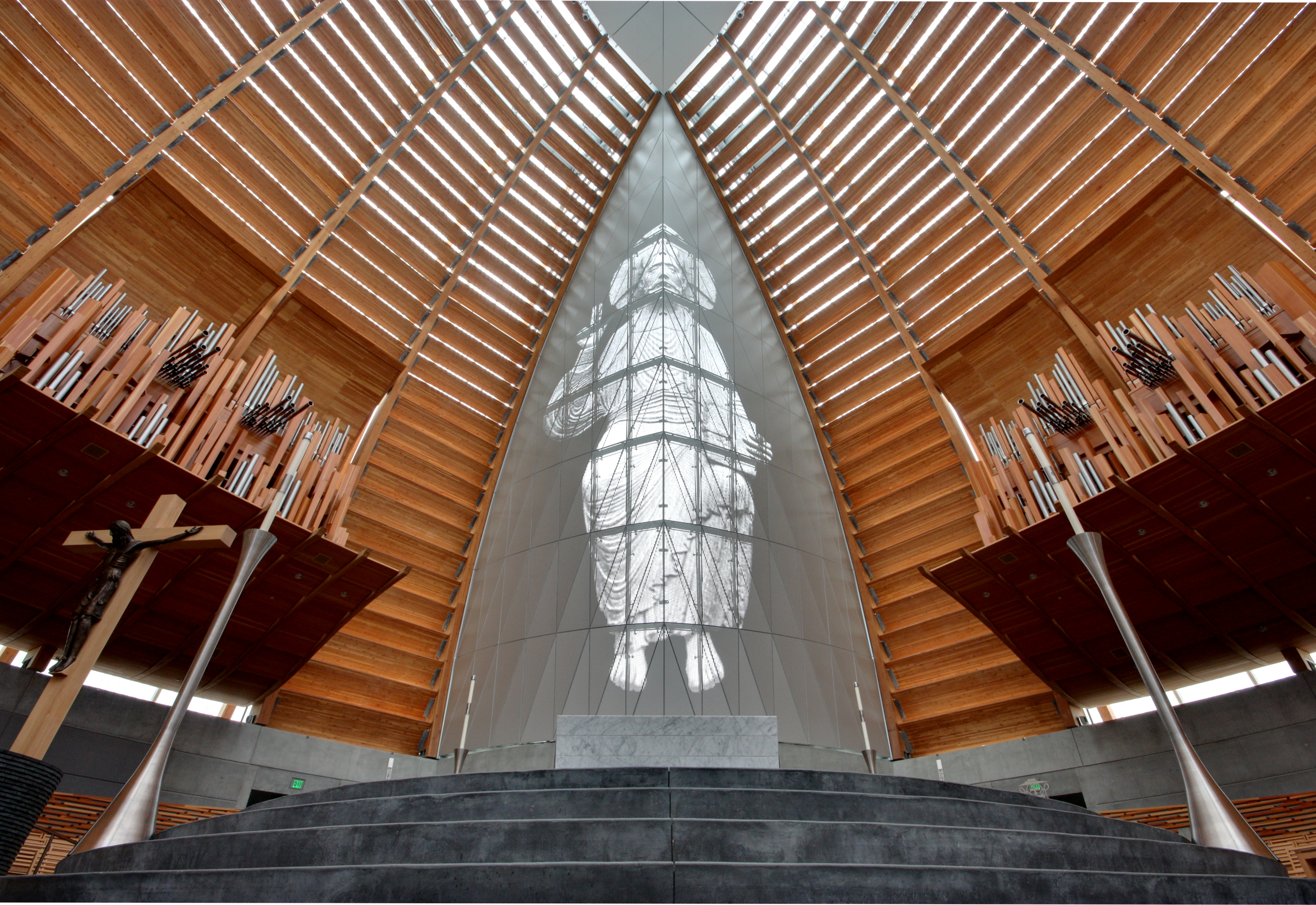
Organ on both sides of the altar

Orgues Létourneau Limitée Organ Opus 118 was installed on both side of the Vesica. It has 92 ranks with 5298 pipes.

- Great Organ C-c^{4}: Double Diapason 16', First Diapason 8', Second Diapason 8', Harmonic Flute 8', Salicional 8', Chimney Flute 8', Principal 4', Open Flute 4', Fifteenth 2', Mixture IV-V 2-2/3', Sharp Mixture III 1', Cornet III 2-2/3', Trumpet 8', Trompeta de luz 8', Tremulant
- Solo Organ C-c^{4}: Doppel Flute 8', Viole d'Orchestre 8', Viole Celeste 8', Clarinet 8', English Horn 8' Tuba 8', Trompeta de luz 8', Tremulant
- Swell Organ C-c^{4}: Gamba 16', Open Diapason 8', Gamba 8', Voix Celeste 8', Bourdon 8', Principal 4', Spire Flute 4', Nazard 2-2/3', Flageolet 2', Tierce 1-3/5', Mixture V 2', Double Trumpet 16', Trumpet 8', Hautboy 8', Clarion 4', Tremulant
- Choir Organ C-c^{4}: Violonbass 16', Open Diapason 8', Violoncello 8', Cello Celeste 8', Spindle Flute 8', Principal 4', Fifteenth 2', Mixture IV-V 1-1/3', Fagotto 16', Trumpet 8', Clarion 4', Tremulant
- Bombarde Organ C-c^{4}: Double Diapason 16’, Open Diapason 8’, Quint 5-1/3’, Principal 4’, Full Mixture V-VII 2-2/3’, Bombarde 16’, Trompette 8’, Clarion 4’, Trompeta de luz 8’
- Echo Choir Organ C-c^{4}: Lieblich Gedackt 16', Principal 8', Chimney Flute 8', Dolce Flute 8', Flute Celeste 8', Traverse Flute 4', Piccolo 2', Larigot 1-1/3', Oboe 8', Vox Humana 8', Tremulant
- Pedal Organ C-g^{1}: Contra Bourdon 32', Open Wood 16', Double Diapason 16', Bourdon 16', Subbass 16', Violonbass 16', Gamba 16', Lieblich Gedackt 16', Quint 10-2/3', Open Diapason 8', Bourdon 8', Violoncello 8', Gamba 8', Lieblich Gedackt 8', Quint 5-1/3', Principal 4', Nachthorn 4', Open Flute 2', Mixture V 2-2/3', Contra Trombone 32', Bombarde 16', Trombone 16', Fagotto 16', Trompette 8', Fagotto 8', Clairon 4', Schalmey 4', Trompeta de luz 8', Tremulant

== Costs and criticism ==
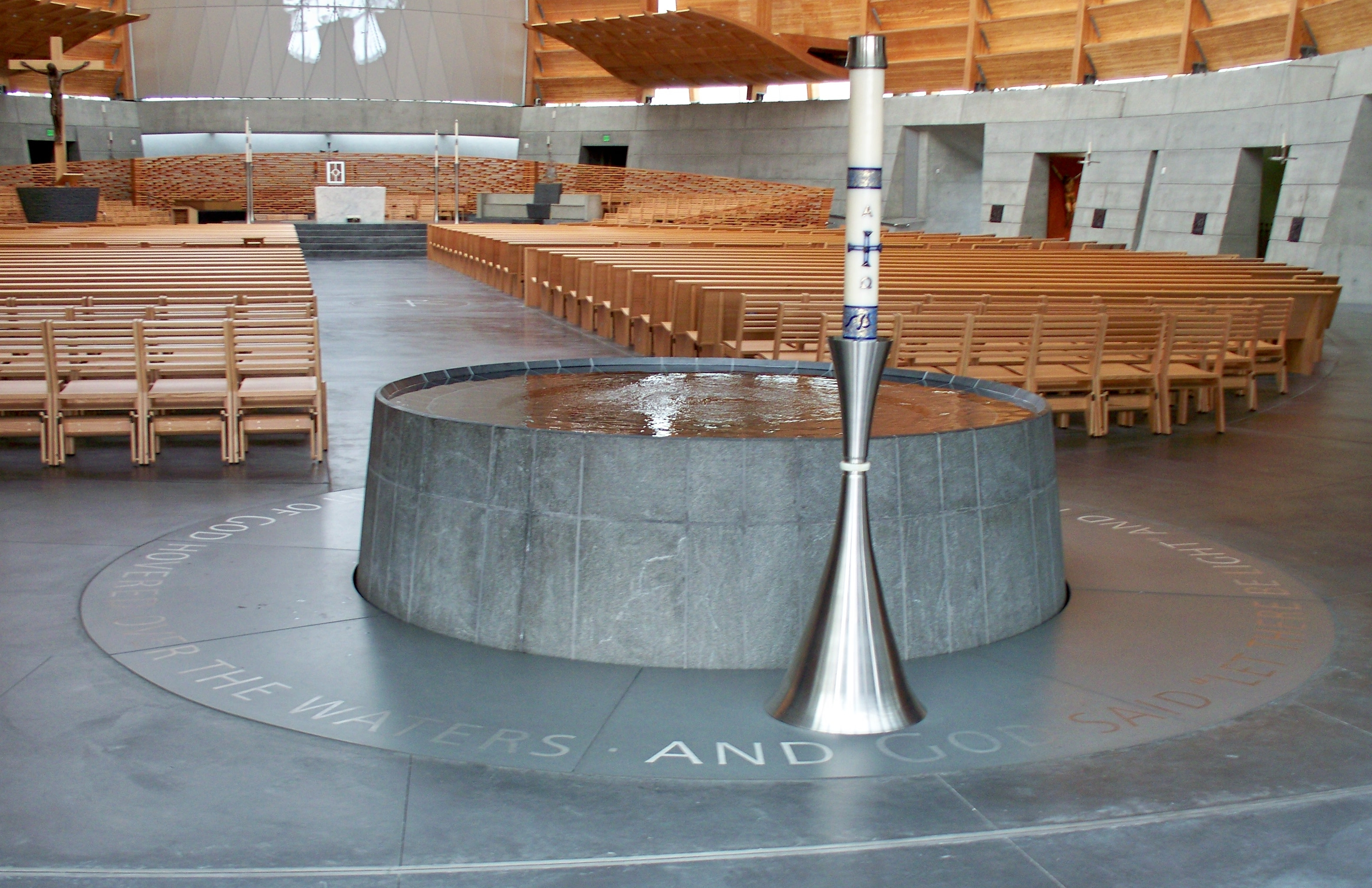
Baptismal font

The Catholic Cathedral Corporation of the East Bay was an outgrowth of a February 2000 meeting of representatives from parishes of the Diocese of Oakland. The summit reached consensus to proceed with the planning of a new cathedral. The newly incorporated Catholic Cathedral Corporation of the East Bay, a non-profit organization independent of the chancery of the Diocese of Oakland, began soliciting donations for its Cathedral Campaign.

Despite considerable support, the Cathedral Campaign gained critics concerned with its price tag for construction increasing from $131 million in 2003, when the design was chosen, to an estimated $190 million in 2007, to $175 million, reduced by cost-cutting measures in the final year. Some questioned whether the money should not have been spent more appropriately elsewhere. Proponents countered that the Diocese of Oakland spends $350 million on social services and education annually while the $175 million cost of the cathedral would be spread over three years of construction and four years of design. They also noted that the cathedral was financed by donations solicited specifically for the project. Suggestions were made to use the donations for other projects instead, like those administered by the diocese to help the poor or to build new schools. Rev. Leo Edgerly Jr., who serves on the cathedral advisory board, replied to the critics: "You can go to Europe and see Gothic cathedrals," he said. "You can come to Oakland and see this."

== Mausoleum ==
People entombed include:

- Floyd Lawrence Begin
- John Madden

== See also ==
- List of Catholic cathedrals in the United States
- List of cathedrals in the United States

== Notes ==
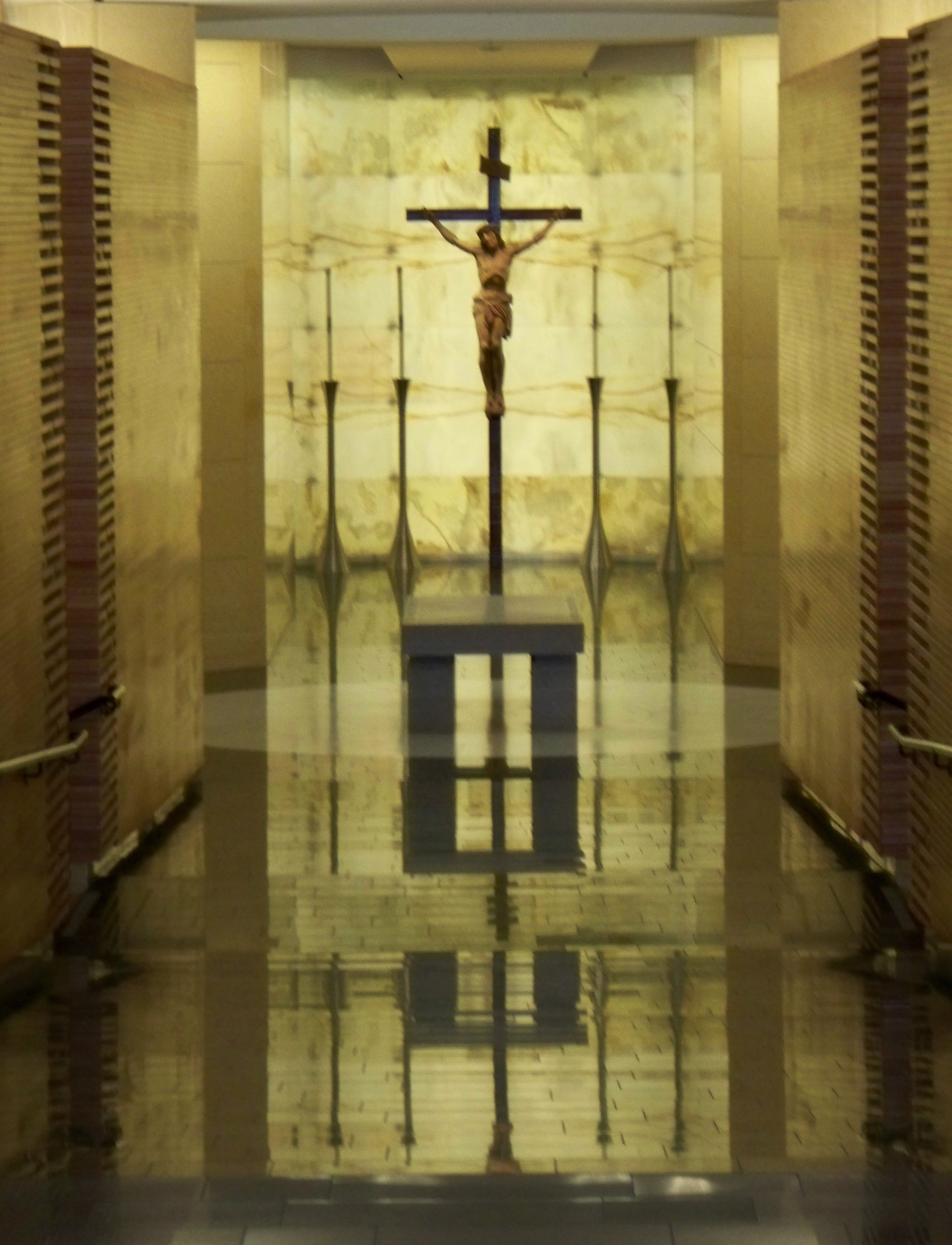
Cathedral crypt
