= Michael C. Barber =

American Catholic prelate (born 1954)

His Excellency, The Most Reverend Michael C. Barber SJ
- Bishop of Oakland
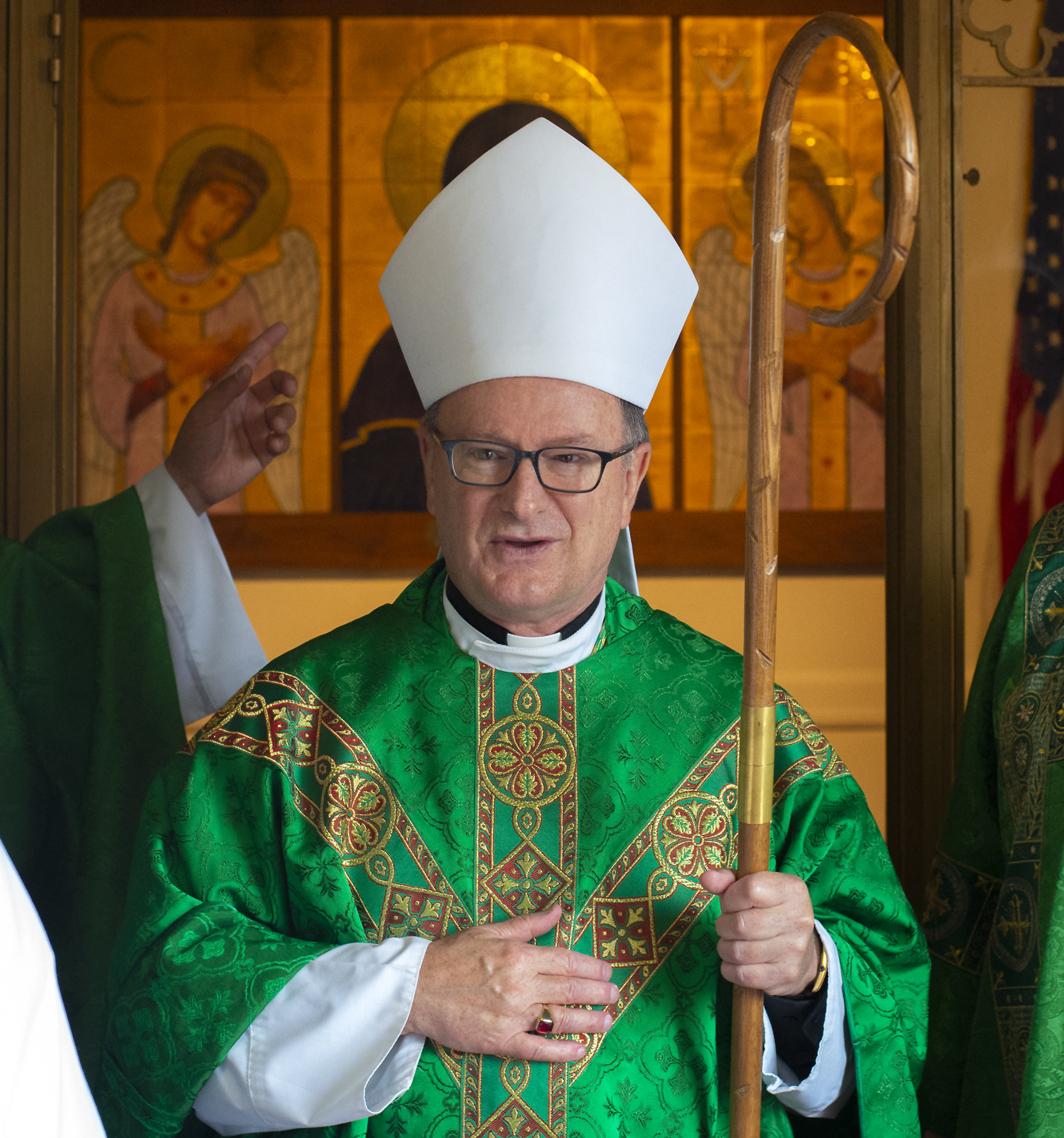
- Bishop Barber in 2020
- Church: Catholic Church
- Diocese: Oakland
- Appointed: May 3, 2013
- Installed: May 25, 2013
- Predecessor: Salvatore Cordileone

Orders
- Ordination: June 8, 1985 by John Raphael Quinn
- Consecration: May 25, 2013 by Salvatore Cordileone, Carlos Arthur Sevilla, Thomas Anthony Daly

Personal details
- Born: July 13, 1954 (age 72) Salt Lake City, Utah, US
- Denomination: Catholic
- Education: Loyola Marymount University; Gonzaga University; Regis College, Toronto; Pontifical Gregorian University
- Motto: Deus misericordiarum pater (Latin for 'God the father of mercies')
- Styles
- Reference style: His Excellency; The Most Reverend
- Spoken style: Your Excellency
- Religious style: Bishop

Michael Charles Barber (born July 13, 1954) is an American Catholic prelate serving as Bishop of Oakland since 2013. He is a member of the Jesuits.

== Biography ==
=== Early life and education ===
Barber was born on July 13, 1954, in Salt Lake City, Utah. He attended Saint Pius X Preparatory School in Galt, California.

After finishing high school, Barber decided to become a priest; he entered the Society of Jesus (Jesuit) novitiate in 1973. He then attended Loyola Marymount University in Los Angeles. To continue his education, Barber travelled to Spokane, Washington, to attend Gonzaga University. He received a Bachelor of Arts degree in philosophy and history from Gonzaga in 1978.

Barber in 1982 entered Regis College at the University of Toronto, where he received Master of Divinity and Bachelor of Sacred Theology degrees in 1985.

=== Ordination and ministry ===
Barber was ordained a priest at the Cathedral of Saint Mary of the Assumption in San Francisco by Archbishop John Quinn for the Jesuits on June 8, 1985. After his ordination, the Jesuits sent Barber to Apia in Western Samoa to serve as a missionary for two years.

After leaving Samoa, Barber went to Rome to study at the Pontifical Gregorian University. He received a Licentiate in Systematic Theology from the Gregorian in 1989. From 1990 to 1991, he served as an assistant professor at the university. In 1991, Barber enlisted as a chaplain in the U.S. Naval Reserve, achieving the rank of captain.

The Jesuits sent Barber in 1992 to the United Kingdom to serve as a tutor and chaplain at the University of Oxford. During his six years in Oxford, Barber also worked as bursar of the Jesuit community at Campion Hall.

Barber returned to San Francisco in 1998 after being named director of the School of Pastoral Leadership, with residence first at Saint Agnes Parish and then at Saint Ignatius College in San Francisco. In 2002, Barber was named as a professor and spiritual director at St. Patrick's Seminary in Menlo Park, California. He made his final vows to the Jesuits in 2005. In 2010, after eight years at St. Patrick's Seminary, Barber was appointed director of spiritual formation at Saint John's Seminary in Boston.

=== Bishop of Oakland ===
On May 3, 2013, Pope Francis appointed Barber as bishop of Oakland. He was consecrated by Archbishop Salvatore J. Cordileone on May 25, 2013, at the Cathedral of Christ the Light in Oakland. Barber was the first American Jesuit bishop appointed by Francis. Besides English, Barber speaks Italian, French, Samoan, liturgical Spanish and Latin.

In March, 2014, Barber transferred two pastors, one of whom was openly gay, from Newman Hall Holy Spirit Parish in Berkeley, California. Barber refused to provide any explanation to the pastors or to unhappy parishioners for the transfers.

In 2019, Barber opposed the proposed California State Senate Bill 360, which would have required priests to break the seal of confession and report sexual abuse of minors. He was quoted "I will go to jail before I will obey this attack on our religious freedom." As of 2021, the motu proprio Traditionis custodes restricts the celebration of the Tridentine Mass. On July 18, 2021, Barber approved the continued use of the Traditional Rite according to the 1962 missal in the Diocese of Oakland.

== Honors ==
Barber received the Meritorious Service Medal from the Navy and was invested as a Knight of the Holy Sepulchre and a magistral chaplain of the Order of Malta.

== See also ==
- Catholic Church hierarchy
- Catholic Church in the United States
- Historical list of the Catholic bishops of the United States
- List of Catholic bishops of the United States
- Lists of patriarchs, archbishops, and bishops

== Episcopal succession ==
Catholic Church titles
Preceded by Salvatore Joseph Cordileone	Bishop of Oakland; 2013–present	Succeeded by Incumbent
