= Floyd Lawrence Begin =

American prelate

His Excellency, The Most Reverend Floyd Lawrence Begin
- Bishop of Oakland; Titular bishop of Sala
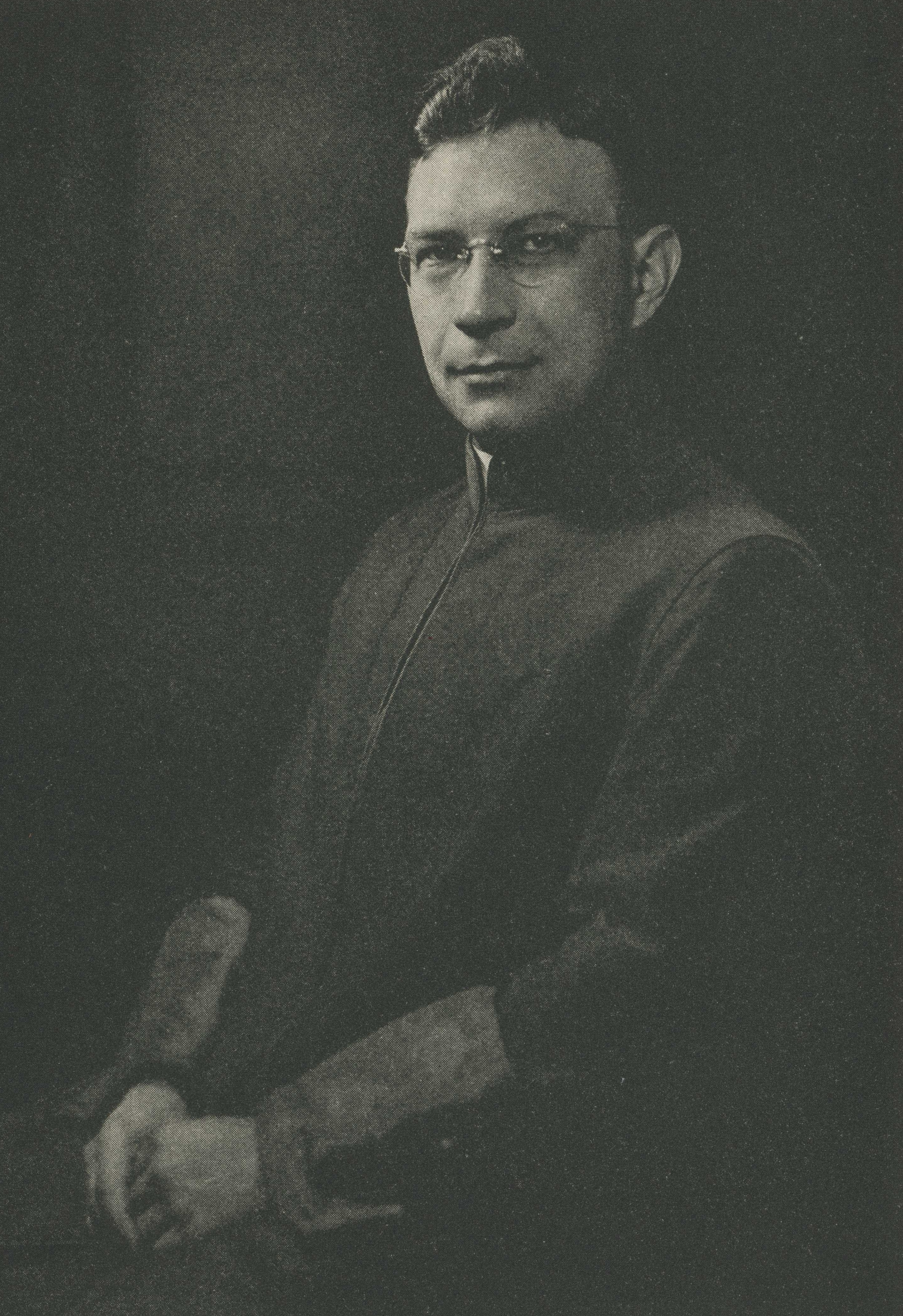
- Church: Roman Catholic Church
- See: Diocese of Oakland
- In office: April 28, 1962 to April 26, 1977
- Successor: John Stephen Cummins
- Other posts: Auxiliary Bishop of Oakland; 1947 to 1962 titular bishop of Sala

Orders
- Ordination: July 31, 1927
- Consecration: May 1, 1947 by Edward Francis Hoban

Personal details
- Born: February 5, 1902 Cleveland, Ohio, U.S.
- Died: April 26, 1977 (aged 75) Oakland, California, U.S.
- Education: Pontifical North American College; Pontifical Urbaniana University; Apollinarus University
- Motto: Adveniat regnum tuum (Let your kingdom come)

Styles of Floyd Lawrence Begin
- Reference style: The Most Reverend
- Spoken style: Your Excellency
- Religious style: Monsignor
- Posthumous style: none

Floyd Lawrence Begin (February 5, 1902 – April 26, 1977) was an American prelate of the Roman Catholic Church. He served as bishop of the Diocese of Oakland, California from 1962 until his death in 1977. He previously served as an auxiliary bishop of the Diocese of Cleveland, Ohio from 1947 to 1962.

== Biography ==
=== Early life and education ===
Floyd Begin was born in Cleveland, Ohio, the eldest of three children of Peter H. and Stella Agnes (née McFarland) Begin. He received his early education at the parochial schools of St. Columbkille and St. Thomas Aquinas Parishes. Begin attended Cathedral Latin High School in Chardon, Ohio (1916–20) and St. John Cathedral College (1920–22) in Cleveland. He graduated from St. Ignatius High School (Cleveland) in 1920

Begin studied for the priesthood at the Pontifical North American College in Rome, where he served as assistant to the rector during his studies. He earned a doctorate in philosophy and doctorate in theology from the Pontifical Urbaniana University. In 1930, Begin received a doctorate in canon law from the Apollinarus University.

=== Priesthood ===
Begin was ordained a priest for the Diocese of Cleveland in Rome on July 31, 1927. Following his return to Ohio, he briefly served as administrator of St. Anthony Parish in Canton. From 1930 to 1938, he served as secretary to Bishop Joseph Schrembs as well as vice-chancellor and pro-vicar general of the diocese.

Begin became an officialis of the diocesan tribunal in 1938. He served as director of both the Diocesan Council of Catholic Men and the seventh National Eucharistic Congress. Begin was also chaplain of the Rosemary Home for Crippled Children in Euclid. Ohio, and diocesan vicar for religious. He was named by Pope Pius XI a papal chamberlain in 1934, and raised by Pius XI to the rank of domestic prelate in 1936.

=== Auxiliary Bishop of Cleveland ===
On March 22, 1947, Begin was appointed an auxiliary bishop of Cleveland and titular bishop of Sala by Pope Pius XII. He received his episcopal consecration on May 1, 1947. at St. Agnes Church in Cleveland from Bishop Edward Hoban, with Bishops James A. McFadden and Joseph McGucken serving as co-consecrators. Begin was named vicar general of the diocese in March 1948 and pastor of St. Agnes Parish in Cleveland in January 1949.

During his tenure at St. Agnes, Begin advocated more services for and acceptance of African Americans, who composed most of the parishioners at St. Agnes. In 1954, he unsuccessfully tried to obtain a Knights of Columbus charter for an interracial council in Cleveland. When the Knights of Columbus refused to give the charter, Begin declared, "The only reason they're being kept out is their color. Anyone who denies that is a pussy-footing liar."

=== Bishop of Oakland ===
On January 27, 1962, Begin was appointed the first bishop of the newly erected Diocese of Oakland by Pope John XXIII. The diocese comprised Alameda and Contra Costa Counties in the San Francisco Bay Area, and included 386,000 Catholics. His installation took place on April 28, 1962. Between 1962 and 1965, Begin attended all four sessions of the Second Vatican Council.

He intervened to save a native American Ohlones cemetery from being destroyed by highway construction in Fremont in the 1960s.

=== Death and legacy ===
Floyd Begin died in Oakland on April 26, 1977. Archbishop Joseph McGucken celebrated the funeral mass. Begin was buried in the bishops' crypt at Holy Sepulchre Cemetery in Hayward, California. In 2008, his remains were re-interred in the mausoleum of the new Cathedral of Christ the Light in Oakland, California.

Catholic Church titles
Preceded by None	Bishop of Oakland; 1962–1977	Succeeded by John Stephen Cummins
