= Diocese of Oakland =

Latin Catholic ecclesiastical jurisdiction in California, US

Coordinates: 37°48′16″N 122°16′15″W

Diocese of Oakland Diœcesis Quercopolitana
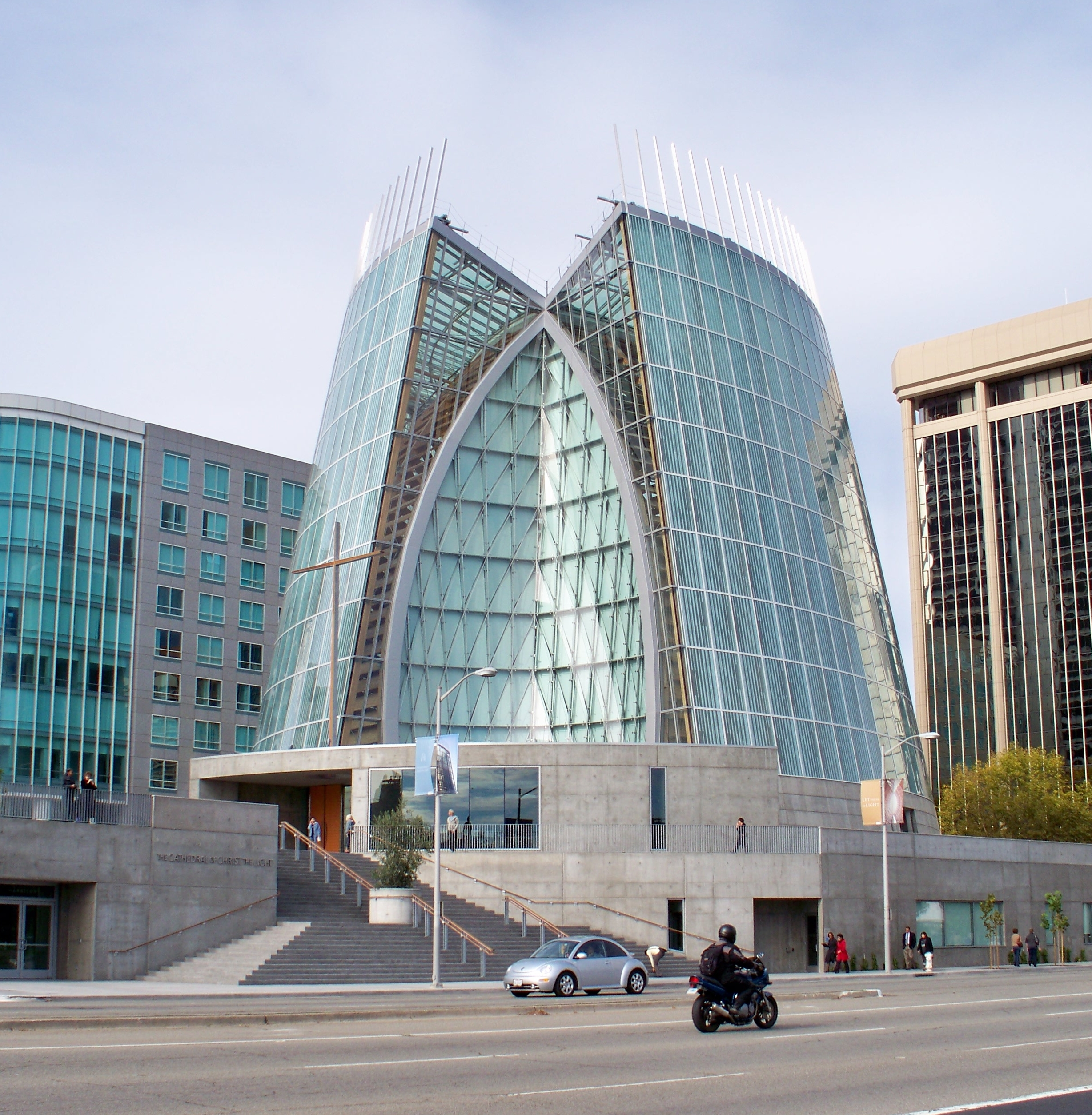
- Cathedral of Christ the Light

- Coat of arms

Location
- Country: United States
- Territory: Counties of Alameda and Contra Costa
- Ecclesiastical province: Archdiocese of San Francisco

Statistics
- Area: 1,467 sq mi (3,800 km^{2})
- Population: 550,000
- Parishes: 84
- Schools: 54

Information
- Denomination: Catholic
- Sui iuris church: Latin Church
- Rite: Roman Rite
- Established: January 13, 1962
- Cathedral: The Cathedral of Christ the Light
- Patron saint: Mary, Queen of the World, Francis de Sales

Current leadership
- Pope: Leo XIV
- Bishop: Michael C. Barber
- Metropolitan Archbishop: Salvatore J. Cordileone
- Vicar General: George Mockel

Map
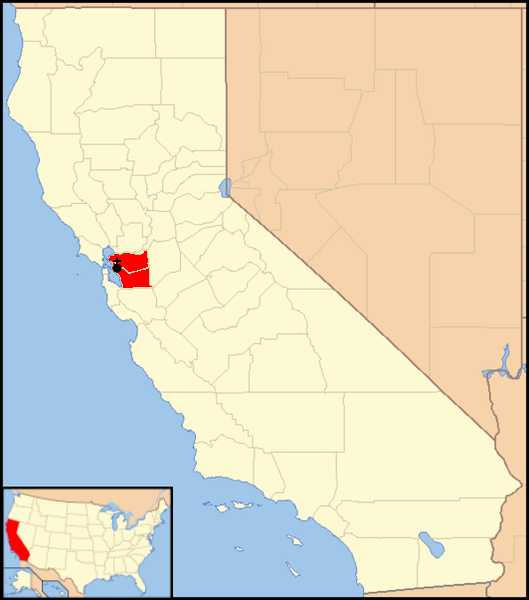

Website
- oakdiocese.org

The Diocese of Oakland (Latin: Diœcesis Quercopolitana) is a diocese of the Catholic Church in the San Francisco Bay Area of California in the United States. It is a suffragan diocese in the ecclesiastical province of the metropolitan Archbishop of San Francisco. Its mother church is the Cathedral of Christ the Light in Oakland.

== History ==
=== Name changes ===
The East Bay area has undergone several different Catholic jurisdictions since it became part of the United States.

- Diocese of the Two Californias (1840 to 1849)
- Diocese of Monterey (1849 to 1853)
- Archdiocese of San Francisco (1853 to 1962)
- Diocese of Oakland (1962 to present)

=== 1772 to 1840 ===
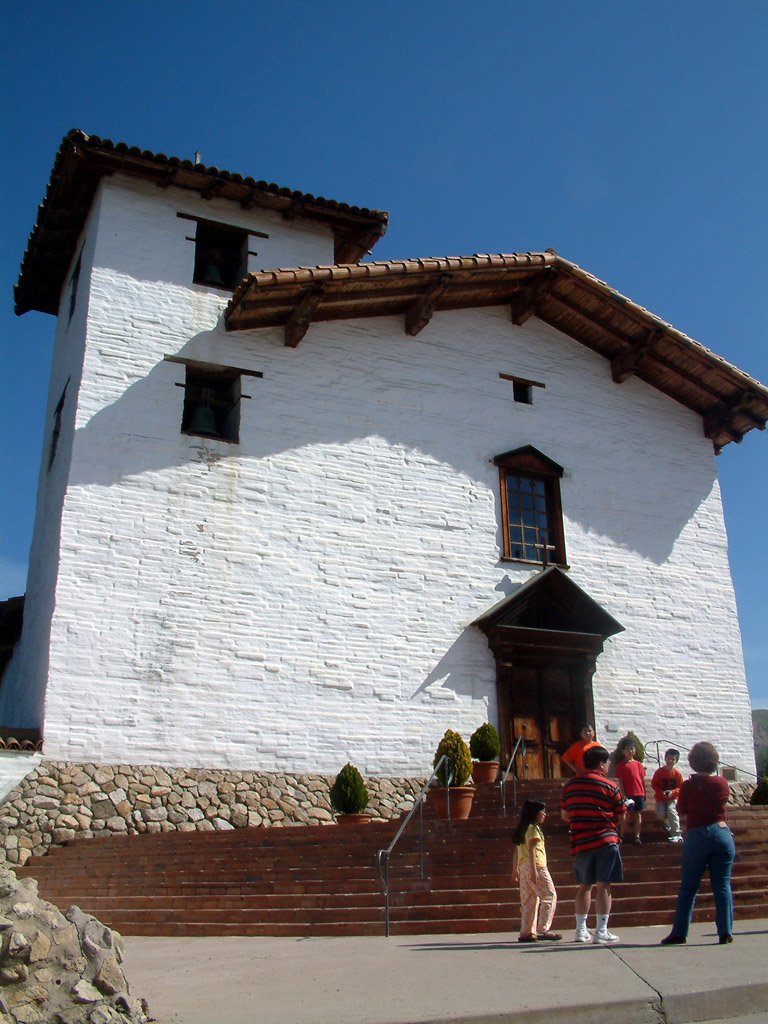
Mission San José, Fremont, California. First parish in the diocese (2010)

The first known mass in the Eastern Bay region was celebrated in 1772 by the missionary Juan Crespí near present-day Lake Merritt during the first European visit there. The Mission San José was established in 1797 by Fermin de Lasuen in present-day Fremont to evangelize the Chochenyo people. By this time, Alta California (Upper California) was a province in the Spanish colony of New Spain.

After the Mexican War of Independence ended in 1821, Alta California became part of the new nation of Mexico. After the passage of the Mexican secularization act of 1833, the Mexican Government in 1836 stripped Mission San José, along with other Catholic missions in Alta California, of their vast properties.

In the 1820s, the Peralta family, a large landowner in present-day Alameda County, built a chapel at Rancho San Antonio, their ranch in present-day Oakland. Served by priests from Mission San José, the chapel was named Saint Anthony's. This was the first Catholic presence in Oakland.

=== 1840 to 1883 ===
After the Mexican–American War ended 1850, Mexico ceded Alta California to the United States. In 1853, Bishop Joseph Alemany of Monterey moved to San Francisco to become the first archbishop of San Francisco in the new State of California. At that time, Mission San José was the only parish in the East Bay area. The East Bay area would remain part of the archdiocese for the next 109 years.

In 1858, Alemany sent James Croke to establish St. Mary, Immaculate Conception Parish in Oakland. The first church in San Leandro was St. Leander's Church, dedicated in 1864 to serving a growing Portuguese immigrant population. The Sisters of the Holy Names of Jesus and Mary in 1868 founded Holy Name College in Oakland; it closed in 2023.

The archbishop in 1869 formed All Saints Parish in Hayward, composed mainly of immigrant families. Its church was dedicated in 1923. St. Michael's parish, the first in Livermore, was established in 1872. In 1893, Saint Francis de Sales Church was dedicated in Oakland. St. Joseph's Church, the first Catholic church in Berkeley, was dedicated in 1883.

=== 1883 to 2003 ===
In 1962, Pope John XXIII erected the Diocese of Oakland, taking Alameda and Contra Costa counties from the Archdiocese of San Francisco. The pope named Auxiliary Bishop Floyd Begin of the Diocese of Cleveland as the first bishop of Oakland.

When Begin started his tenure, the new diocese had a Catholic population of approximately 386,000 Catholics. Saint Francis de Sales Church was designated as the cathedral. During the 1970s. the cathedral parish was known for developing what was called the "Oakland Cathedral Sound". Begin died in 1977.

The second bishop of Oakland was Auxiliary Bishop John Stephen Cummins from the Diocese of Sacramento, named by Pope Paul VI in 1977. The 1989 Loma Prieta earthquake in the Bay Area caused catastrophic damage to Saint Francis de Sales Cathedral and Sacred Heart Church. Facing a repair cost of $8 million for both facilities, Cummins opted to demolish them and plan a new cathedral instead. Auxiliary Bishop Allen Vigneron from the Archdiocese of Detroit was named coadjutor bishop by Pope John Paul II in early 2003 to assist Cummins.

=== Since 2003 ===
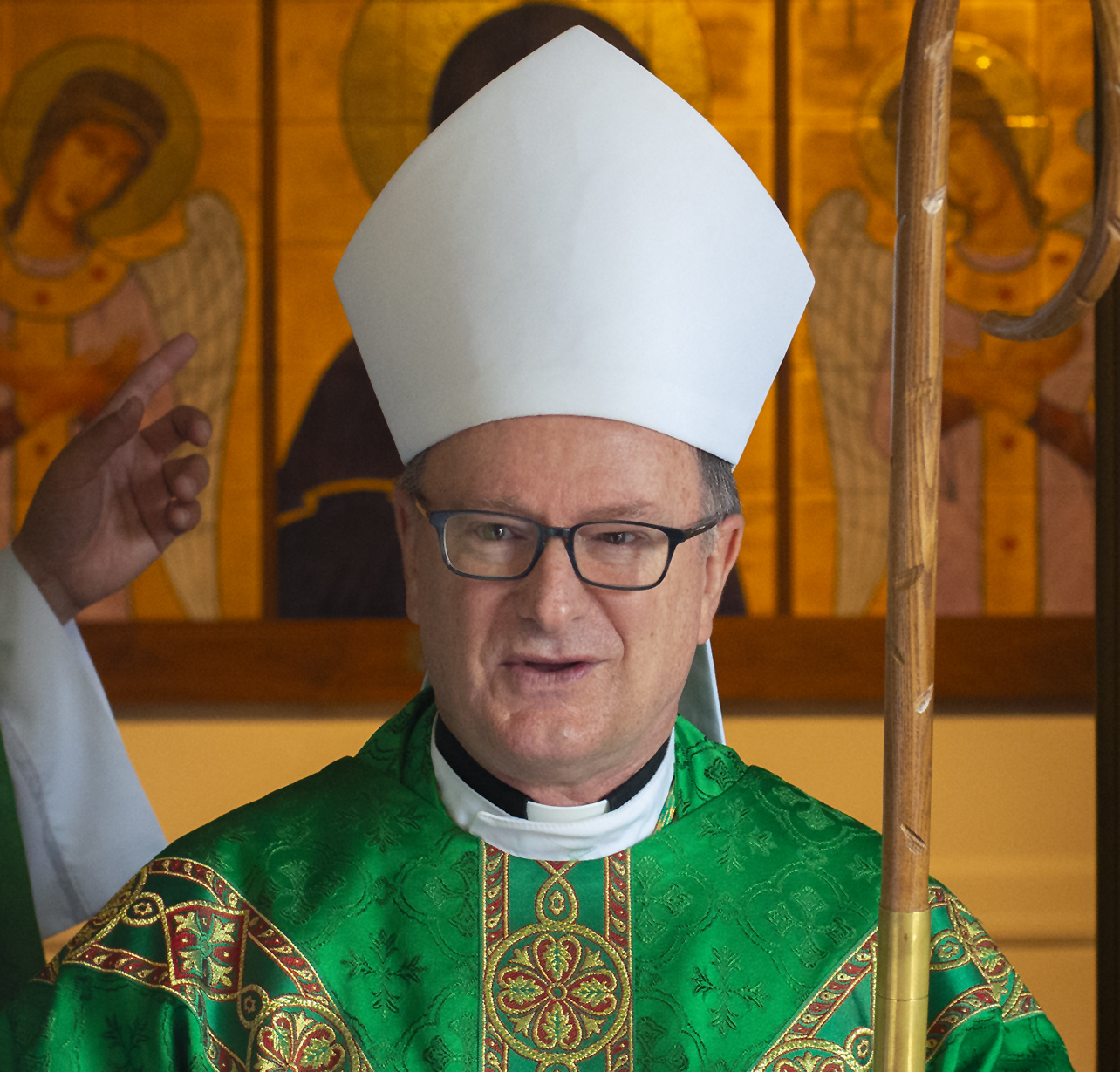
Bishop Barber (2020)

When Cummins retired in later 2003, Vigneron automatically replaced him as bishop. In 2005, the diocese broke ground for the new $131 million Cathedral of Christ the Light on Lake Merritt in Oakland. It was dedicated in 2008.

To replace Vigneron, who had been named archbishop of Detroit, Pope Benedict XVI in 2009 appointed Auxiliary Bishop Salvatore Cordileone of the Diocese of San Diego as the next bishop of Oakland. In 2012, Benedict XVI named him as archbishop of San Francisco.

Pope Francis in 2013 appointed Michael C. Barber as the next bishop of Oakland. In 2014, Barber transferred two pastors, one of whom was openly gay, from Newman Hall Holy Spirit Parish in Berkeley. Barber refused to provide any explanation for the transfers to the pastors or to their parishioners.

A car crash in Wilbur, California, in October 2019 killed Archbishop Dominic Jala from the Archdiocese of Shillong in India, along with Mathew Vellankal, a local priest.

In May 2019, Barber positioned himself against the proposed California State Senate Bill 360, which would have required priests to break the seal of confession and report sexual abuse of minors. He was quoted "I will go to jail before I will obey this attack on our religious freedom." Barber in May 2021 was robbed while walking around the cathedral one night. The robber got away with Barber's cash and episcopal ring.

In May 2023, the diocese filed for Chapter 11 bankruptcy. The diocese was facing 330 lawsuits regarding sexual abuse claims.

== Statistics ==
As of 2020, the Diocese of Oakland served an estimated Catholic population of 560,000. The diocese had 84 parishes and 16 pastoral centers. The diocese celebrates mass in 15 different languages including Spanish, American Sign Language, Vietnamese, Filipino, and Latin (Mass of Paul VI and Tridentine Mass).

== Publications ==
The Diocese of Oakland publishes The Catholic Voice, its official newspaper, on a quarterly basis.

== Sexual abuse scandals ==
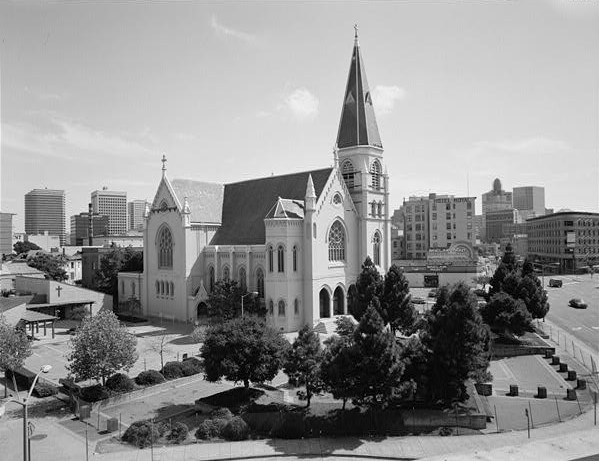
St. Francis de Sales Cathedral, Oakland, California (pre-1989)

Linda Chapin was awarded $3 million in a 2004 sexual abuse settlement reached with the diocese. She had accused Monsignor George Francis, pastor of St. Bede Parish in Hayward, of raping her as a small child.

In 2005, Tim Stier from Corpus Christi Catholic Parish in Fremont resigned in protest of what he described as the diocese ignoring or hiding child sex abuse cases.

In 2005, court papers revealed how the diocese handled sexual abuse allegations against Stephen Kiesle. Eight victims had accused the priest of sexually abusing them in the 1970s. In 1978, Kiesle had pleaded no contest to a misdemeanor charge of lewd conduct. The diocese suspended his priestly functions, but allowed him to continue to work in the diocese. Kiesle was laicized in 1987. In 2004, he was sentenced to six years in prison for sexually abusing a 13-year-old girl in Truckee.

In 2005, the diocese settled its outstanding sexual abuse lawsuits for $56 million. The eight victims of abuse by Kiesle each received between $1 million and $1.5 million. The insurance carriers for the diocese covered 57% of these payments. Bishop Vigneron in 2008 opened a healing garden at the Cathedral of Christ the Light, dedicated to victims of clergy sexual abuse.

By 2008, at least 64 Roman Catholic clergy and religious had been accused of molesting children. At that time, the diocese had only acknowledged 12 clergy with credible accusations of sexual abuse. Aside from Francis and Kiesle, seven further priests had credible accusations of multiple instances of sexual abuse.

By 2009, the diocese had paid $60.5 million in financial settlements to victims of sexual abuse.

In July 2020, Varghese Alengadan from St. Joseph Basilica in Alameda was charged with committing sexual battery against a woman in 2019. Alengadan never showed up in court and was considered a fugitive. After the alleged victim filed her accusation against Alegadan in early 2020, the diocese suspended him from ministry. In December 2020, the diocese paid $3.5 million to settle a lawsuit brought by a former seminarian who claimed he was raped by a diocesan priest in Livermore in 2017.

The diocese filed for bankruptcy in May 2023, saying that 330 new sexual abuse lawsuits had been filed against it since 2020. Joseph Piscitelli, a 1970s victim in the diocese of Oakland whose 2020 case was put on hold when the diocese declared bankruptcy, criticized the diocese for building "a $200 million cathedral" but not making reparations for victims of sexual abuse.

== Bishops ==
=== Bishops of Oakland ===
1. Floyd Lawrence Begin (1962–1977)
2. John Stephen Cummins (1977–2003)
3. Allen Henry Vigneron (2003–2009), appointed Archbishop of Detroit
4. Salvatore Cordileone (2009–2012), appointed Archbishop of San Francisco
5. Michael C. Barber, S.J. (2013–present)

== Education ==
As of 2025, the Diocese of Oakland has 37 elementary/middle schools and nine high schools serving over 17,000 students.

=== High schools ===
As of 2025, the Diocese of Oakland has the following high schools:

- Bishop O'Dowd High School – Oakland
- Carondelet High School – Concord
- Cristo Rey De la Salle East Bay High School – Oakland
- De La Salle High School – Concord
- Holy Names High School – Oakland
- Moreau Catholic High School – Hayward
- Salesian College Preparatory – Richmond
- St. Joseph Notre Dame High School – Alameda
- St. Mary's College High School – Albany

=== Elementary schools ===
As of 2025, the Diocese of Oakland has numerous elementary schools.
