= John Stephen Cummins =

American Roman Catholic prelate (1928–2024)

His Excellency, The Most Reverend John Stephen Cummins
- Bishop of Oakland
- Archdiocese: San Francisco
- Diocese: Oakland
- Appointed: May 3, 1977
- Installed: June 30, 1977
- Retired: October 1, 2003
- Predecessor: Floyd Lawrence Begin
- Successor: Allen Henry Vigneron
- Previous posts: Auxiliary Bishop of Sacramento and Titular Bishop of Lambaesis (1974–1977)

Orders
- Ordination: January 24, 1953 by Hugh Aloysius Donohoe
- Consecration: May 16, 1974 by Alden John Bell, Floyd Lawrence Begin, and Hugh Aloysius Donohoe

Personal details
- Born: March 3, 1928 Oakland, California, United States
- Died: December 3, 2024 (aged 96) Oakland
- Buried: Cathedral of Christ the Light, Mausoleum
- Education: St. Joseph's College Seminary; St. Patrick's Seminary; University of California, Berkeley
- Motto: Through Christ our Lord

Styles of John Stephen Cummins
- Reference style: His Excellency; The Most Reverend
- Spoken style: Your Excellency
- Religious style: Bishop

John Stephen Cummins (March 3, 1928 – December 3, 2024) was an American Catholic prelate who served as bishop of Oakland in California from 1977 to 2003 and as an auxiliary bishop of the Diocese of Sacramento in California from 1974 to 1977.

== Biography ==
=== Early life and education ===
John Cummins was born on March 3, 1928, in Berkeley, California, to Michael and Mary (née Connolly) Cummins, Irish immigrants. His brother Bernard Cummins was a priest who served as superintendent of schools in the Archdiocese of San Francisco.

Cummins received his primary education at St. Augustine Parish School in Oakland. In 1941, he began his studies for the priesthood at St. Joseph's College Seminary in Mountain View, California, where he earned a Bachelor of Arts degree in 1947 In 1947, he entered St. Patrick's Seminary in Menlo Park, California, earning a Master of Divinity degree in 1953. Cummins later worked on graduate studies in history at the University of California, Berkeley.

=== Priesthood ===
On January 24, 1953, Cummins was ordained a priest by Bishop Hugh Donohoe at the Cathedral of St. Mary of the Assumption in San Francisco.

Cummins' first assignment was as a curate at Mission Dolores Basilica in San Francisco, where he remained for four years. He also served as chaplain at the Newman Centre of San Francisco State University and at Mills College. In 1957, Cummins started teaching at Bishop O'Dowd High School in Oakland, staying there until 1962, when he became chancellor of the Diocese of Oakland. He was named a domestic prelate by the Vatican in 1963.

In addition to his duties as chancellor, Cummins coordinated the Social Justice and Ecumenical Commissions, and oversaw the diocesan insurance program. He also served as the diocesan liaison to the Dominican School of Philosophy and Theology in Berkeley, the Franciscan School of Theology in Oceanside, California, and the Jesuit School of Theology of Santa Clara University.

Cummins continued to serve as chancellor until 1971, when he was named executive director of the California Catholic Conference. In that capacity, he channeled the functions of the conference by providing liaison with state departments and with the California State Legislature, disseminating information to Catholic associations and organizations and to other state conferences and the United States Catholic Conference (USCCB) and coordinating interdiocesan activities in the areas of education and welfare.

=== Auxiliary Bishop of Sacramento ===
On February 26, 1974, Pope Paul VI appointed Cummins as an auxiliary bishop of Sacramento and titular bishop of Lambaesis. He received his episcopal consecration on May 16, 1974, from Bishop Alden Bell, with Bishops Floyd Begin and Hugh Donohoe serving as co-consecrators, at the Memorial Auditorium in Sacramento. As an auxiliary bishop, Cummins continued to serve as executive director of the California Catholic Conference, a position which he held until 1977.

=== Bishop of Oakland ===
Following the death of Bishop Floyd Begin, Pope Paul VI appointed Cummins as the second bishop of the Diocese of Oakland on May 3, 1977. His installation took place on June 30, 1977.

In February 1982, Cummins wrote to Cardinal Joseph Ratzinger, then head of the Congregation for the Doctrine of the Faith, forwarding a request from Stephen Kiesle, a priest in the diocese, to be laicized. Kiesle had been convicted of misdemeanor lewd conduct with a child in 1978 and had been suspended by the diocese from ministry. After a request from the Vatican in 1982 for more documentation, Cummins heard nothing from Ratzinger until 1985, when Cummins was told the matter would take more time. Kiesle was finally defrocked in 1987.

Cummins served as chairman of the USCCB Liturgy Committee (1981–84), the Laity Committee (1988–91), and the Migration and Refugee Services Committee (1995–98). From 1992 to 1995, he was co-chair of the Roman Catholic-Reformed-Presbyterian Dialogue Commission and a consultant of the Ecumenical and Religious Committee. Cummins was president of the California Catholic Conference from 1988 to 1997. He was chairman of the Catholic Legal Immigration Network, Inc. (CLINIC) from 1995 to 1999, and served as a delegate to several synods in Rome.

=== Retirement and death ===
After reaching the mandatory retirement age of 75 for bishops, Cummins resigned as Bishop of Oakland on October 1, 2003. That same day, Saint Mary's College of California in Moraga, California, announced that Cummins would be working in the newly established John S. Cummins Catholic Institute for Thought, Culture and Action.

On April 4, 2004, Cummins testified for the plaintiffs in a sexual abuse lawsuit against the Diocese of Oakland. The plaintiffs were two brothers, Bob and Tom Thatcher, who charged that Reverend Robert Ponciroli, a pastor at St. Ignatius Parish in Antioch, California, molested them when they were minors in the early 1980s. Cummins said that he learned about allegations against Ponciroli in 1995, but did not notify police or try to find the victims. Cummins apologized for his failure to search for the victims. In 2016, Cummins published the book Vatican II, Berkeley and Beyond, a collection of reflections on the Vatican II Council and its effects on the church.

Cummins died in Oakland on December 3, 2024, at the age of 96.

== See also ==
- Catholic Church hierarchy
- Catholic Church in the United States
- Historical list of the Catholic bishops of the United States
- List of Catholic bishops of the United States
- Lists of patriarchs, archbishops, and bishops

== Episcopal succession ==
Catholic Church titles
| Preceded by Floyd Lawrence Begin | Bishop of Oakland; 1977–2003 | Succeeded by Allen Henry Vigneron |
| Preceded by Thomas Edward Gill | Titular Bishop of Lambaesis; 1974–1977 | Succeeded by John Joseph Paul |
| Preceded by — | Auxiliary Bishop of Sacramento; 1974–1977 | Succeeded by — |
