= List of parishes of the Diocese of Honolulu =

The Roman Catholic Diocese of Honolulu covers the Hawaiian Island chain, with churches on Oah'u, Maui, Kaua'i, Molokai, Lanai and the Big Island. The diocese is divided into nine vicariates.

== West Honolulu Vicariate ==
This list contains parishes in Honolulu on the island of O'ahu.

Name	Image	Location	Description/notes
Blessed Sacrament		2124 Pauoa Rd, Pauoa Valley	Founded in the 1940s, church dedicated in 1938
Cathedral Basilica of Our Lady of Peace		1184 Bishop St, Honolulu	Oldest Catholic parish in the Hawaiian Islands. Constructed in 1828, consecrated in 1843
Co-Cathedral of St. Theresa of the Child Jesus		712 N. School St, Honolulu	Founded in 1931, co-cathedral dedicated in 1932
Co-Cathedral Vietnamese Holy Martyrs Catholic Community		712 North School St, Honolulu	
Holy Family		830 Main St, Honolulu	
Korean Catholic Community		511 Main St, Honolulu	
Our Lady of the Mount		1614 Monte St, Kalihi Valley	Founded in 1870, church dedicated in 1903
St. Anthony		640 Puuhale Rd, Kalihi-Kai	
St. John the Baptist		2324 Omilo Ln, Honolulu	Founded in 1840s, church dedicated in 1857
St. Philomena		3300 Ala Laulani St, Salt Lake	Founded in 1942, church dedicated in 1973.
St. Stephen		2747 Pali Hwy, Honolulu	

== East Honolulu Vicariate ==
This list contains parishes in Honolulu.

Name	Image	Location	Description/notes
Holy Trinity		5919 Kalanianaʻole Hwy, Honolulu	Founded in 1944, church dedicated in 1958
Mary, Star of the Sea		4470 Aliikoa St, Honolulu	Founded in 1946
Newman Center/Holy Spirit		1941 East-West Rd, Honolulu	Chapel constructed in the 1980s, serves University of Hawaiʻi at Mānoa community
Sacred Heart		1701 Wilder Ave, Honolulu	Founded as mission in 1883, church dedicated in 1914
St. Augustine by the Sea		130 Ohua Ave, Honolulu	Founded in 1854, the third parish in Hawaii. Church dedicated in 1962
Ss. Peter and Paul		800 Kaheka St, Honolulu	Founded in 1968, church dedicated in 1969
St. Patrick		1124 7th Ave., Honolulu	Church consecrated in 1929
St. Pius X		2821 Lowrey Ave, Honolulu	Founded in 1958.

== Leeward Oʻahu Vicariate ==
This list contains parishes on the western side of O'ahu.

Name	Image	Location	Description/notes
Immaculate Conception		91-1298 Renton Rd, Ewa Beach	Founded in 1890s, church dedicated in 1929
Our Lady of Perpetual Help		91-1004 North Rd, Ewa Beach	Founded as mission in 1949, became parish in 1969, church dedicated in 1978
Sacred Heart		85-786 Old Government Rd, Waianae	
St. Joseph		94-675 Farrington Hwy, Waipahu	Founded in early 1900s, church dedicated in 1941, has largest congregation in the diocese.
St. Jude		92-455 Makakilo Dr, Makakilo	Founded in 1988, church dedicated in 1999
St. Rita		89-318 Farrington Hwy, Nānākuli	Founded as mission in 1928, church dedicated in 1934

== Central Oʻahu Vicariate ==
This list contains parishes in O'ahu and the island of Molokaʻi.

Name	Image	Location	Description/notes
Our Lady of Good Counsel		1525 Waimano Home Rd, Pearl City	Founded in 1958, church dedicated in 1959
Our Lady of Sorrows		1403 California Ave # A, Wahiawa	Founded as mission in 1928, became parish in 1939, church consecrated in 1959
Resurrection of the Lord		94-1260 Lumikula St, Waipahu	Church dedicated in 1985
St. Elizabeth		99-312 Moanalua Rd, Aiea	Founded in the 1860s, church dedicated in 1925
St. John Apostle and Evangelist		5-370 Kuahelani Ave, Mililani	Founded in 1951, church dedicated in 1973
St. Michael		67-390 Goodale Ave, Waialua	Founded as mission in 1840, parish established in 1853, church constructed in 1923
St. Damien of Molokai		115 Ala Malama St, Kaunakakai	Church dedicated in 2011
		Our Lady of Seven Sorrows Church, 8011 Kamehameha V Hwy, Kaunakakai	Church built by Reverend Damien in 1874, oldest church on Moloka'i. Supervised by St. Damien of Molokai Parish
		St. Vincent Ferrer Church, 274 Maunaloa Rd, Maunaloa	Church dedicated in 1940. Supervised by St. Damien of Molokai Parish
St. Francis		Damien Rd, Kalaupapa	Founded in 1870s, church dedicated in 1908
		St. Philomena Church, Kalaupapa	Church dedicated between 1872 and 1889. Supervised by St. Francis Parish

== Windward Oʻahu Vicariate ==
This list contains parishes on the eastern side of O'ahu.

Name	Image	Location	Description/notes
Our Lady of Mount Carmel		48-422 Kamehameha Hwy, Kaneohe	Founded as mission in 1841, church dedicated in 1939, became parish in 1968
St. Ann		46-129 Haiku Rd, Kaneohe	
St. Anthony of Padua		148 Makawao St. # A, Kailua	Founded in 1920s, church dedicated in 1968
St. George		41-1323 Kalanianaʻole Hwy, Waimānalo	Founded as mission in 1842, became parish in 1954, church dedicated in 1959
St. John Vianney		920 Keolu Dr, Kailua	Founded in 1962, church dedicated in 1963
St. Roch		56-350 Kamehameha Hwy, Kahuku	
		St. Joachim Mission Church, 53-536 Kamehameha Hwy, Punalu'u	Supervised by St. Roch Parish

== West Hawaiʻi Vicariate ==
This list contains parishes and mission churches on the island of Hawaii (the Big Island).

Name	Image	Location	Description/notes
Big Island Catholic Church		Annunciation Church, 65-1235 Kawaihae Rd, Waimea	Part of Big Island Catholic Church
		Annunciation Mission Church, 69-1789 Puako Beach Dr, Puako	Part of Big Island Catholic Church
Our Lady of Lourdes		45-5028 Plumeria St, Honokaa	Founded in 1882, church dedicated in 1927
Most Sacred Heart of Jesus		55-3374 Akoni Pule Hwy, Hawi	Founded in 1860s by Reverend Damien, church consecrated in 1925
St. Benedict		84-5140 Painted Church Rd, Captain Cook	Founded in the 1840s, church dedicated in 1902. Known as the Painted Church due to its extensive murals.
St. Michael the Archangel		75-5769 Ali‘i Dr, Kailua-Kona	Founded in 1840, the first parish on the Island of Hawaii. Church dedicated in 2015.
		Immaculate Conception Mission Church, 76-5960 Mamalahoa Hwy, Holualoa	Founded in 1880 to serve Filipino and Portuguese immigrants. Church dedicated in 1944. Supervised by St. Michael the Archangel Parish.
		Holy Rosary Mission Church, Old Mamalahoa Hwy, Kailua-Kona	Supervised by St. Michael the Archangel Parish.
		St. Paul Mission Church	Founded in 1864, church closed after the 2006 Kiholo Bay earthquake. Supervised by St. Michael the Archangel Parish.
		St. Peter by the Sea Mission Church, 78-6684 Alii Drive, Kailua-Kona	Founded in the 1880s, church dedicated in 1912. Supervised by St. Michael the Archangel Parish.

== East Hawaiʻi Vicariate ==
This list contains parishes on the Island of Hawaii

Name	Image	Location	Description/notes
Hamakua Catholic Community		Immaculate Heart of Mary Church, 27-186 Kaapoko Homestead Rd, Papaikou	Merged in Hamakua Catholic Community in 2022
		St. Anthony Church, 35-2095 Old Mamalahoa Hwy, Laupahoehoe	Merged in Hamakua Catholic Community in 2022
Holy Rosary		96-3143 Pikake St, Pahala	
Malia Puka O Kalani (Mary, Gate of Heaven)		326 Desha Ave, Hilo	
Sacred Heart		95-5558 Hawaiʻi Belt Rd, Naalehu	
Sacred Heart		15-3003 Pahoa Village Rd, Pāhoa	Parish founded in 1880s, church dedicated in 1929
St. Joseph Catholic Church		43 Kapiolani St, Hilo	Parish founded in 1845, church dedicated in 1919
St. Theresa		181355 Volcano Rd, Mountain View	Church dedicated in 1936

== Kauaʻi Vicariate ==
This list contains parishes and mission churches on the island of Kauai.

Name	Image	Location	Description/notes
Holy Cross		2-2370 Kaumualii Hwy, Kalaheo	
		Sacred Heart Mission Church, 2626 Melemele Rd, ʻEleʻele	Supervised by Holy Cross Parish
Immaculate Conception		4453 Kapaia Rd, Lihue	
St. Catherine of Alexandria Parish		St. Catherine of Alexandria Church, 5021a Kawaihau Rd, Kapaʻa	Founded in the 1880s, church dedicated in 1958. Supervised by St. Catherine of Alexandria Parish
		St. Sylvester Church, 2390 Kolo Rd, Kilauea	Founded in the 1870s, church dedicated in the 1950s. Supervised by St. Catherine of Alexandria Parish
		St, William Church, 5292-A Kuhio Hwy, Hanalei	Supervised by St. Catherine of Alexandria Parish
St. Raphael		3011 Hapa Rd, Koloa	Oldest parish on Kauai, was founded in 1841. Church dedicated in 2012
St. Theresa		343 Kaumualii Hwy, Kekaha	Founded in 1893, church dedicated in 1941
		Sacred Hearts of Jesus and Mary Mission Church, 9496 Kaumualii Hwy, Waimea	Supervised by St. Theresa Parish

== Maui Vicariate ==
This list contains parishes on the islands of Maui and Lānaʻi.

Name	Image	Location	Description/notes
Christ the King		20 W Wakea Ave, Kahului	Founded in 1932 as a mission, became parish in 1942, church dedicated in 1932
Holy Rosary		954 Baldwin Ave, Pā'ia	
Maria Lanakila		712 Waine'e St, Lahaina	Founded in 1846, church dedicated in 1873
		Sacred Hearts Mission Church, 500 Office Road, Kapalua	Supervised by Maria Lanakila Parish
Kula Catholic Community		Our Lady Queen of Angels Church, 9177 Kula Hwy, Kula	Founded in 1930s, church dedicated in 1940
		Holy Ghost Mission Church, 4300 Lower Kula Rd, Kula	Founded in 1880s for Portuguese immigrants, church dedicated in 1899
		St. James the Less Mission Church	Church dedicated in 2002
St. Ann		40 Kuhinia St, Wailuku	
		St. Francis Xavier Mission Church, Kahekili Hwy, Kahakuloa	Supervised by St. Ann Parish
St. Anthony of Padua		1627 Mill St, Wailuku	Founded in 1840s, church dedicated in 1980
St. Joseph		1294 Makawao Ave, Makawao	Parish founded in 1880s, church dedicated in 1911.
St. Mary		5000 Hana Hwy, Hana	
		St. Peter Mission Church, 37 St Peter Church Rd, Hana	Supervised by St. Mary Parish
		St. Paul Mission Church, 41145 Hana Hwy, Kipahulu	Supervised by St. Mary Parish
		St. Joseph Mission Church	Supervised by St. Mary Parish
St. Rita		655 Haiku Rd, Haiku	Founded as mission in 1921 church dedicated in the 1920s, became a parish in 1950
		St. Gabriel Mission Church	Church dedicated in 1937, became a mission of St. Rita Parish in 1950
St. Theresa		25 W Lipoa St, Kihei	
Sacred Hearts		815 Fraser Ave, Lanai City	Church dedicated in 1931

== See also ==
- List of Catholic churches in the United States
