= Thanatopsis =

Poem by William Cullen Bryant

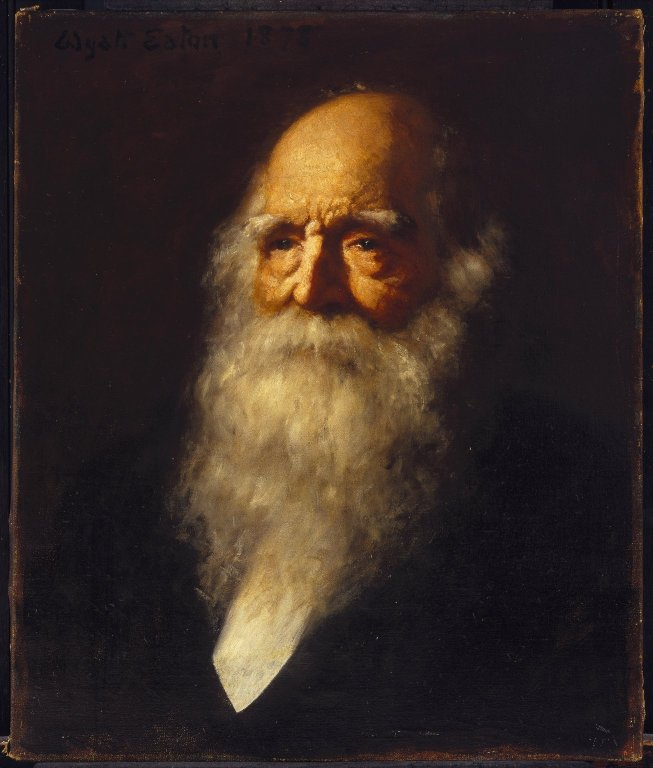
An 1878 portrait of William Cullen Bryant

"Thanatopsis" is an early poem by the American poet William Cullen Bryant, written in blank verse. The title means "a consideration of death", from the Greek words thanatos (death) and opsis (view, sight).

== Background ==
William Cullen Bryant was born in 1794 in Cummington, Massachusetts. He grew up in a Puritan home with his father, Peter Bryant, a prominent doctor who provided him with much of his early education. In his early life Bryant would spend a great deal of time in the woods surrounding his family's New England home, and read of the extensive personal library his father had. Bryant's first published poem was "The Embargo; or, Sketches of the Times", a satirical work concerning Thomas Jefferson's Embargo Act of 1807. It was published in a Boston newspaper in 1808. In 1810 Bryant was forced to leave Williams College for lack of money. Instead of a formal education, he started studying law, and began learning an eclectic mix of poetry, such as the works of Isaac Watts and Henry Kirke White, and verses like William Cowper's The Task and Edmund Spenser's The Faerie Queene.

When and where Bryant wrote "Thanatopsis" is unclear, and Bryant himself could not remember when he wrote the verse. According to Parke Godwin, Bryant's friend, Bryant wrote the poem when he was seventeen years old in mid-1811, just after he had left Williams College.

Bryant reportedly wrote his first draft of "Thanatopsis" in Flora's Glen in Williamstown.

In History of American Literature, two dates are stated for the authoring of "Thanatopsis", 1811 and 1816. Bryant's inspiration for "Thanatopsis" came after reading William Wordsworth's Lyrical Ballads, as well as Robert Blair's "The Grave", Beilby Porteus's "Death" and Kirke White's "Time". After Bryant had left Cummington to begin his law studies, his father discovered a manuscript in Bryant's desk drawer, that contained "Thanatopsis" and a fragment of a poem, which would be published under the title "The Fragment", and later titled "An Inscription upon the Entrance to a Wood". He sent the two poems without his son's knowledge to the editors at the North American Review, where they were published in September 1817. The editors added an introduction to Thanatopsis in a completely different style. The part written by the author begins with "Yet a few days". The author republished the poem in 1821 in a collection of works called Poems. He replaced the introductory section, made a few minor changes to the text and added more material after the original end of the poem, which was "and make their bed with thee!". Below is the revised version of 1821 which was retained in all later publications of the poem:

== Text ==
To him who in the love of Nature holds
Communion with her visible forms, she speaks
A various language; for his gayer hours
She has a voice of gladness, and a smile
And eloquence of beauty, and she glides
Into his darker musings, with a mild
And healing sympathy, that steals away
Their sharpness, ere he is aware. When thoughts
Of the last bitter hour come like a blight
Over thy spirit, and sad images
Of the stern agony, and shroud, and pall,
And breathless darkness, and the narrow house,
Make thee to shudder, and grow sick at heart;—
Go forth, under the open sky, and list
To Nature's teachings, while from all around
Earth and her waters, and the depths of air—
Comes a still voice—Yet a few days, and thee
The all-beholding sun shall see no more
In all his course; nor yet in the cold ground,
Where thy pale form was laid, with many tears,
Nor in the embrace of ocean, shall exist
Thy image. Earth, that nourished thee, shall claim
Thy growth, to be resolved to earth again,
And, lost each human trace, surrendering up
Thine individual being, shalt thou go
To mix for ever with the elements,
To be a brother to the insensible rock
And to the sluggish clod, which the rude swain
Turns with his share, and treads upon. The oak
Shall send his roots abroad, and pierce thy mould.

Yet not to thine eternal resting-place
Shalt thou retire alone, nor couldst thou wish
Couch more magnificent. Thou shalt lie down
With patriarchs of the infant world—with kings,
The powerful of the earth—the wise, the good,
Fair forms, and hoary seers of ages past,
All in one mighty sepulchre. The hills
Rock-ribbed and ancient as the sun,—the vales
Stretching in pensive quietness between;
The venerable woods—rivers that move
In majesty, and the complaining brooks
That make the meadows green; and, poured round all,
Old Ocean's gray and melancholy waste,—
Are but the solemn decorations all
Of the great tomb of man. The golden sun,
The planets, all the infinite host of heaven,
Are shining on the sad abodes of death,
Through the still lapse of ages. All that tread
The globe are but a handful to the tribes
That slumber in its bosom.—Take the wings
Of morning, pierce the Barcan wilderness,
Or lose thyself in the continuous woods
Where rolls the Oregon, and hears no sound,
Save his own dashings—yet the dead are there:
And millions in those solitudes, since first
The flight of years began, have laid them down
In their last sleep—the dead reign there alone.

So shalt thou rest, and what if thou withdraw
In silence from the living, and no friend
Take note of thy departure? All that breathe
Will share thy destiny. The gay will laugh
When thou art gone, the solemn brood of care
Plod on, and each one as before will chase
His favorite phantom; yet all these shall leave
Their mirth and their employments, and shall come
And make their bed with thee. As the long train
Of ages glide away, the sons of men,
The youth in life's green spring, and he who goes
In the full strength of years, matron and maid,
The speechless babe, and the gray-headed man—
Shall one by one be gathered to thy side,
By those, who in their turn shall follow them.
So live, that when thy summons comes to join
The innumerable caravan, which moves
To that mysterious realm, where each shall take
His chamber in the silent halls of death,
Thou go not, like the quarry-slave at night,
Scourged to his dungeon, but, sustained and soothed
By an unfaltering trust, approach thy grave,
Like one who wraps the drapery of his couch
About him, and lies down to pleasant dreams.

== Critical reception ==
Due to the unusual quality of the verse and Bryant's age, Richard Henry Dana Sr., then associate editor at the North American Review, initially doubted its authenticity, saying to another editor, "No one, on this side of the Atlantic, is capable of writing such verses."

"Thanatopsis" remains a milestone in American literary history. Poems was considered by many to be the first major book of American poetry. Nevertheless, over five years, it earned Bryant only $14.92. Poet and literary critic Thomas Holley Chivers, who often accused other writers of stealing poems, said that the only thing Bryant "ever wrote that may be called Poetry is 'Thanatopsis,' which he stole line for line from the Spanish."

== Appearances in popular culture ==
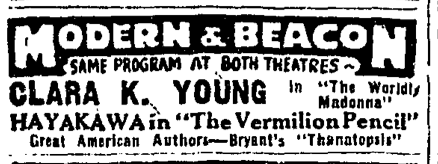
Advertisement for a 1922 screening of Bryant's "Thanatopsis" (part of the Great American Authors film series) at the Modern and Beacon cinemas, Boston

In The Silence of the Lambs by Thomas Harris, Clarice Starling reveals to Hannibal Lecter one detail of her father's last days in a hospital: an elderly neighbour reading to him the last lines of "Thanatopsis". In Sinclair Lewis' novel Main Street, the women's study club of Gopher Prairie is the Thanatopsis club.

The experimental band Thanatopsis (featuring Buckethead and Travis Dickerson) was named after this poem. The band's first album, Thanatopsis, was also named after this poem. The electronic artist Daedelus named the last song on the album Exquisite Corpse after the poem.

The Thanatopsis Pleasure and Inside Straight Club, or Thanatopsis Chowder and Marching Society, or the Young Men's Upper West Side Thanatopsis Literary and Inside Straight Poker Club, were all used as names for a certain poker game that was first formed in Paris during the First World War in the back room at Nini's. The New Yorker founder Harold Ross, Ring Lardner, Alexander Woollcott, Grantland Rice, and F. P. Adams were among the original players. This poker club later re-emerged in NYC when these and other literary figures began meeting at the Algonquin Hotel, where they would play upstairs- before the round table downstairs was eventually ceded to meet the needs of a larger group than the poker game could contain.

The avant-garde filmmaker Ed Emshwiller's 1962 short film Thanatopsis was inspired by the poem. In the Space Ghost Coast to Coast episode "Terminal", a portion of the poem is set to folk music and sung by writer/producer Dave Willis.

In 1934, Scott Bradley composed an oratorio based on Thanatopsis.

In the 1942 film Grand Central Murder, the private railway car where the showgirl is murdered is named Thanatopsis.

In 1942, the night before his execution by a Japanese firing squad, US Army Air Corps pilot William G. Farrow referenced the poem in a letter he wrote to his mother. He had been captured after flying a B-25 Mitchell bomber on the Doolittle Raid on Tokyo. He told her, "Read Thanatopsis by Bryant if you want to know how I am taking this. My faith in God is complete, so I am unafraid."

The American author of detective fiction Phoebe Atwood Taylor has her hero Leonidas Witherall recount the first lines in her 1947 book The Iron Clew. The poem is also mentioned in Taylor's 1934 book The Mystery of the Cape Cod Tavern as having been part of an obituary.

The seminal conservationist Aldo Leopold quoted several passages from Thanatopsis in his posthumously published essay "Some Fundamentals of Conservation in the Southwest."

In August Wilson's 2003 play Gem of the Ocean, Solly offers the final nine lines of the poem ("So live . . . pleasant dreams") as a toast to send off Citizen Barlow to the city of bones. Eli joins Solly in the recitation, offering his own interpretation of the lines: "You die by how you live."

The Acacia Fraternity adopted the last stanza as their code.

Cindy Williams reads from Thanatopsis in Andy Kaufman's ABC-TV special aired in 1979.

In the 2020 film Driveways, Jerry Adler's character quotes the poem as a sudden memory from his childhood; a sign he has dementia.
