= Alfred Hocking House =

Historic house in Hawaii, United States

- U.S. National Register of Historic Places
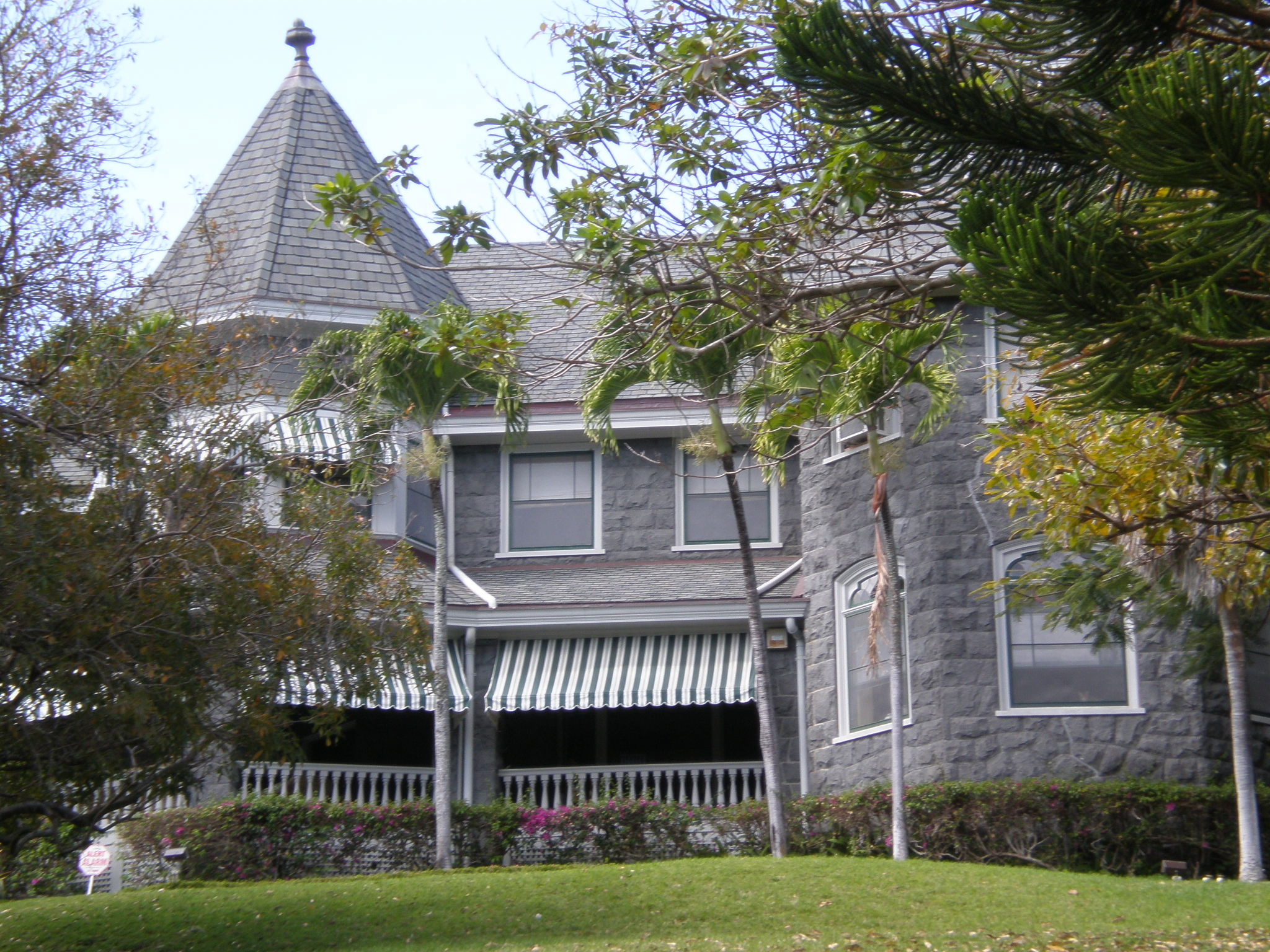
- Alfred Hocking House

- Location within Hawaii
- Location: 1302 Nehoa St., Honolulu, Hawaii
- Coordinates: 21°18′32.02272″N 157°50′5.37036″W
- Area: 0.5 acres (0.20 ha)
- Built: 1903
- Architect: E.A.P. Newcomb and C.W. Dickey
- Architectural style: Queen Anne
- NRHP reference No.: 84000246
- Added to NRHP: November 15, 1984

The Alfred Hocking House (now also known as Graystones) at 1302 Nehoa Street in Honolulu, Hawaii was built in 1903 for Alfred Hocking, founder of the Honolulu Brewing and Malting Company. It was designed in Queen Anne style architecture by E.A.P. Newcomb, a nationally known architect newly arrived in Hawaiʻi, in partnership with the much younger but well-connected local architect C.W. Dickey. It was listed on the Hawaiʻi and National Register of Historic Places in 1984.

Even after Alfred died in 1936 and his wife in 1940, the property remained in the Hocking family until 1947, when it was bought by Dr. and Mrs. Edmund Lee. After Dr. Lee died, the house was known by the name of his widow, Rose Chang Lee. By the time she died, it was badly in need of repair. Honolulu entrepreneur Rick Ralston, founder of Crazy Shirts, then bought and restored it so successfully that it won the "1985 Award for Ground-Up Restoration" from local architects. Ralston also installed new plumbing and air-conditioning, and later sold it to a local developer whose children attended nearby Punahou School. In 2006, after they had gone off to college, he put the house on the market for $5.5 million.

The name Graystones comes from its exterior walls of 21-inch slabs of hand-cut bluestone, complemented by white latticework and green and white awnings over the large wraparound porch. Inside, the house offers living space of 8,210 square feet (763 m^{2}), including seven bedrooms and three-and-a-half baths, with a grand staircase, high ceilings, chandeliers, hardwood floors, redwood wainscoting, Palladian windows, claw-foot bathtubs, and even a fern grotto with tropical flora and a trickling stream off the dining room.
