= North School (Portland, Maine) =

- U.S. National Register of Historic Places
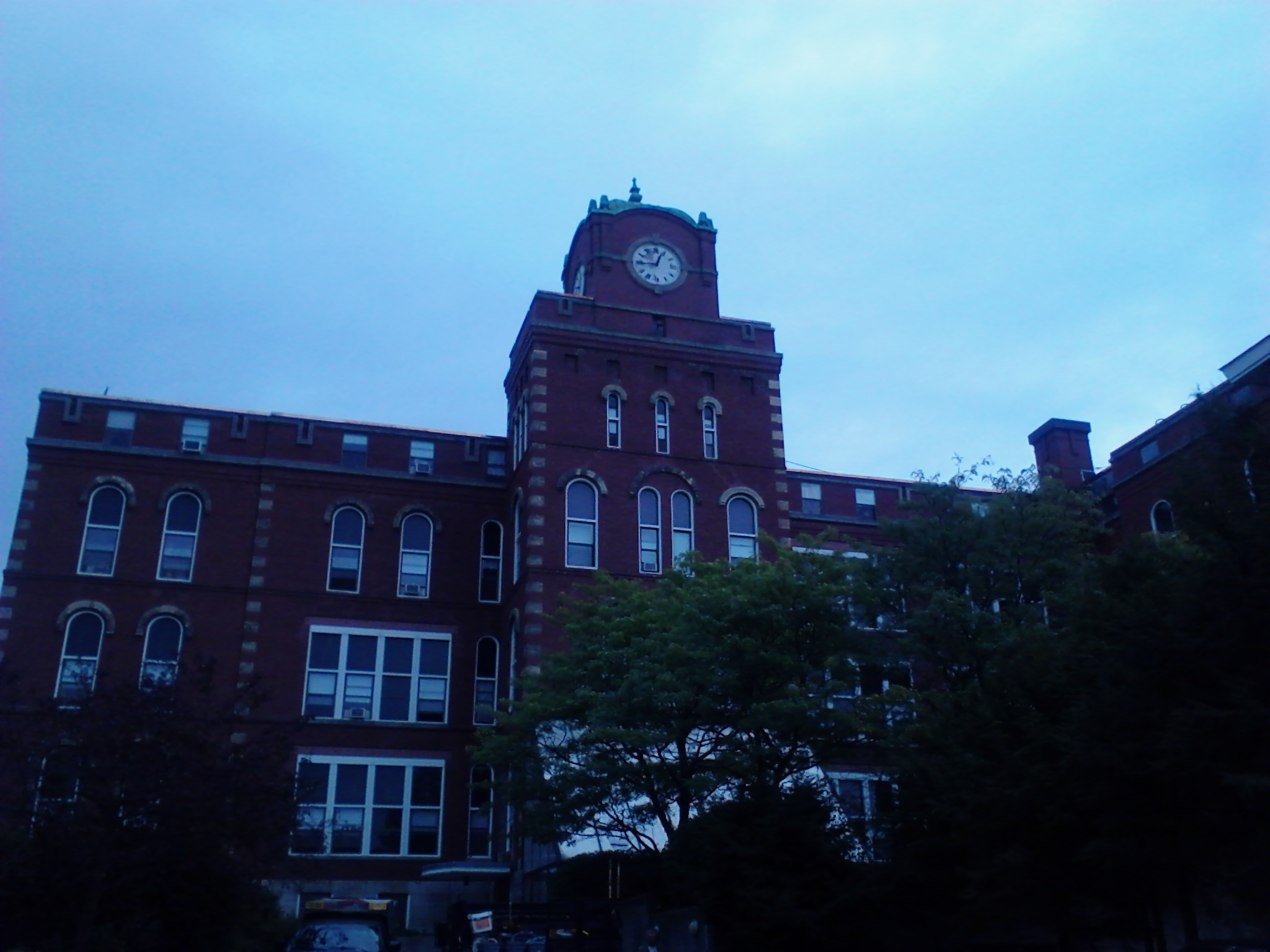
- Pictured in 2012

- Location within Maine Location within the United States
- Location: 248–264 Congress Street, Portland, Maine
- Coordinates: 43°39′44″N 70°15′05″W
- Area: 0.3 acres (0.12 ha)
- Built: 1867
- Architect: Levi Newcomb
- Architectural style: Tudor Revival, Italianate
- NRHP reference No.: 82000749
- Added to NRHP: April 12, 1982

The North School is an historic former school at 248 Congress Street in Portland, Maine. Built in 1867, it was the first primary school in the state to separate students by grade, and was the largest primary school in the state when built. It was listed on the National Register of Historic Places in 1982. It was converted into subsidized housing for seniors by the City of Portland.

== Description and history ==
The North School is located in Portland's East Bayside India Street neighborhood, on the southeast side of Congress Street, just west of the Eastern Cemetery. It is a three-story brick building with Italianate styling. A four-story tower projects from its southwest-facing front facade, capped by a square turret with clock. Windows in the tower are predominantly tall round-arch windows, while windows elsewhere are in part similar, with some replaced by bands of rectangular sash. When built, the building also had a mansard roof; this was removed in 1920–22, when the windows were also altered.

The school was built in 1867 to a design by Levi Newcomb, in the wake of Portland's great 1866 fire, and was the city's largest municipal project of the period. It was the first school in the state to implement the principles of education reformer Henry Barnard, which included the separation of students by grade. In 1894 its attic was fitted with woodworking apparatus for vocational education, and its 1920–22 alterations were designed by John Calvin Stevens. The school remained in use as a primary school until 1979. It was then converted into subsidized senior housing.

== See also ==
- National Register of Historic Places listings in Portland, Maine
