= Sacred Heart Church-Punahou =

United States historic place

- U.S. National Register of Historic Places
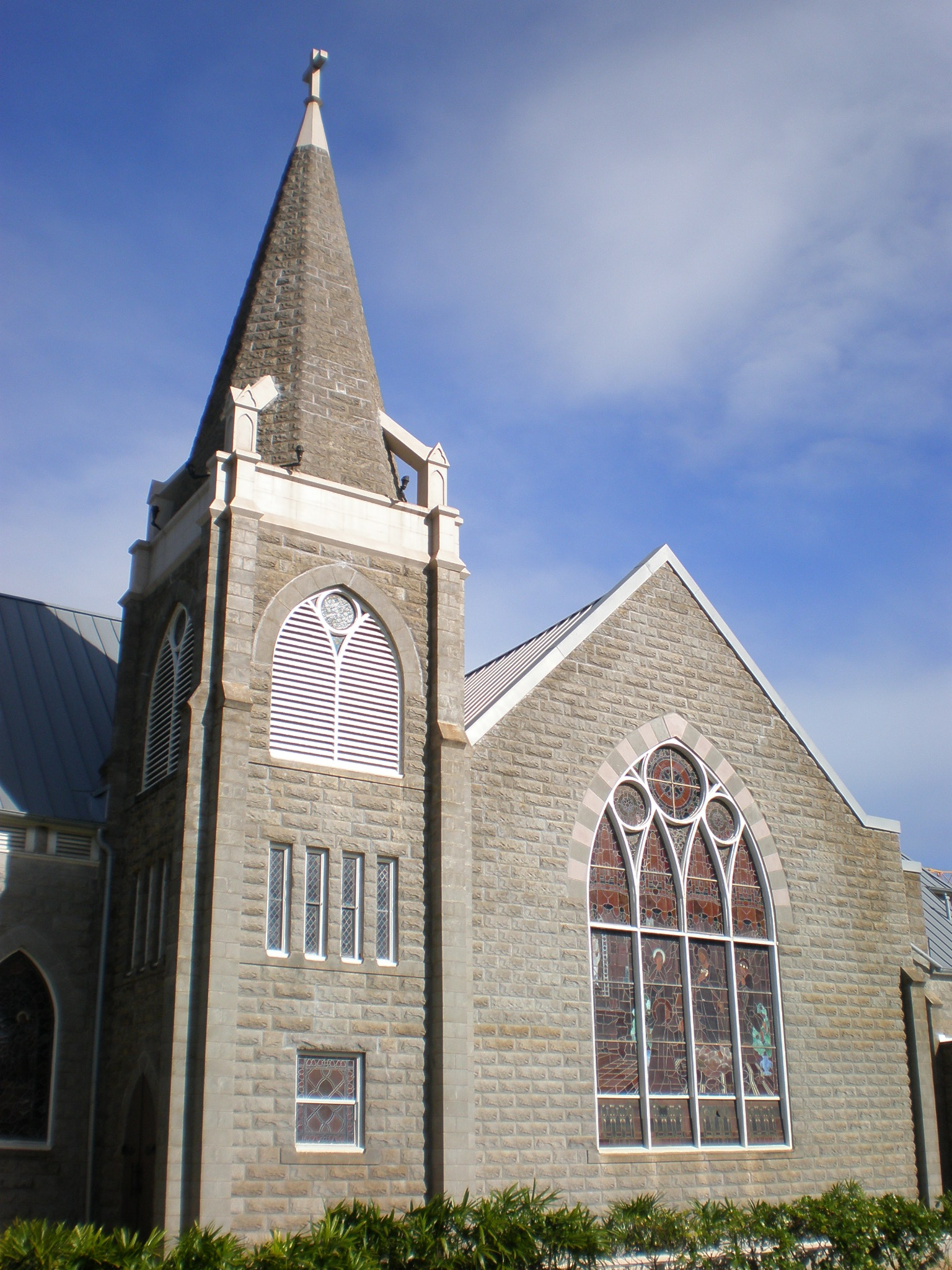

- Location within Hawaii
- Nearest city: Honolulu, Hawaii
- Coordinates: 21°18′06″N 157°49′52″W
- Built: 1914, 1923, 1927
- Architect: E. A. P. Newcomb designed the church Newcomb and Guylor R. Miller designed Bachelot Hall; Guy Rothwell, Kangeter and Marcus C. Lester designed the rectory
- Architectural style: Late Gothic Revival
- NRHP reference No.: 89001855
- Added to NRHP: February 6, 2001

Sacred Heart Church-Punahou is located at 1701 Wilder Avenue, in Honolulu, in the U.S. state of Hawaii. The church was dedicated in 1914, and its adjacent Bachelot Hall was dedicated in 1923. The property's rectory was built in 1927. It was added to the National Register of Historic Places listings on February 6, 2001.

== Background ==
The church body was established by French priest Father Clement Evrard. He arrived from Bremen, Germany at Honolulu Harbor on Oahu on March 19, 1864, on the same ship as Father Damien and a number of Sisters of the Sacred Hearts. He was ordained in Honolulu by Vicar Apostolic of the Hawaiian Islands Louis Désiré Maigret, and initially sent to Kohala along with Damien. In 1881, Clement was reassigned to Saint Louis College in Honolulu, and subsequently started a mission in the Portuguese area of the city. In time, he erected the Sacred Heart chapel.

Father (later Bishop) Stephen Alencastre, of Portuguese ancestry, attended both Saint Louis College and Sacred Heart Chapel as a youth. After training for the priesthood at Catholic University of Leuven in Belgium, he returned to Hawaii in 1902 and was ordained at the chapel.

== Architecture ==
After Father Clement died in 1909, Father Stephen assumed his duties, and commissioned Honolulu architect E. A. P. Newcomb to design a new structure to replace the chapel. The two-story Gothic Revival building, with stained glass windows designed in France, was dedicated November 1, 1914, in a ceremony presided over by Vicar Apostolic and Bishop of Zeugma Libert H. Boeynaems. At that time, the Bishop officially named Father Stephen as pastor of Sacred Heart.

Newcomb and Guylor R. Miller designed Bachelot Memorial Hall, which was completed and dedicated June 23, 1923, with an address by Governor Wallace Rider Farrington. The hall was named after Alexis John Augustine Bachelot, Prefect Apostolic of the Sandwich Islands. His 1827 arrival established the first permanent Catholic mission in the Kingdom of Hawaii.

The 1927 two-story Mediterranean Revival style rectory was designed by Rothwell, Kangeter & Lester, and constructed by Walker & Olund. The three buildings were constructed in such a way as to create a private open space with convenient access to all.

The Sacred Heart complex was added to the National Register of Historic Places listings in Oahu on February 6, 2001.

== See also ==
- List of parishes of the Roman Catholic Diocese of Honolulu
