= Wailuku Elementary School =

- Wailuku Elementary School (as Wailuku School)
- U.S. National Register of Historic Places
- Hawaiʻi Register of Historic Places
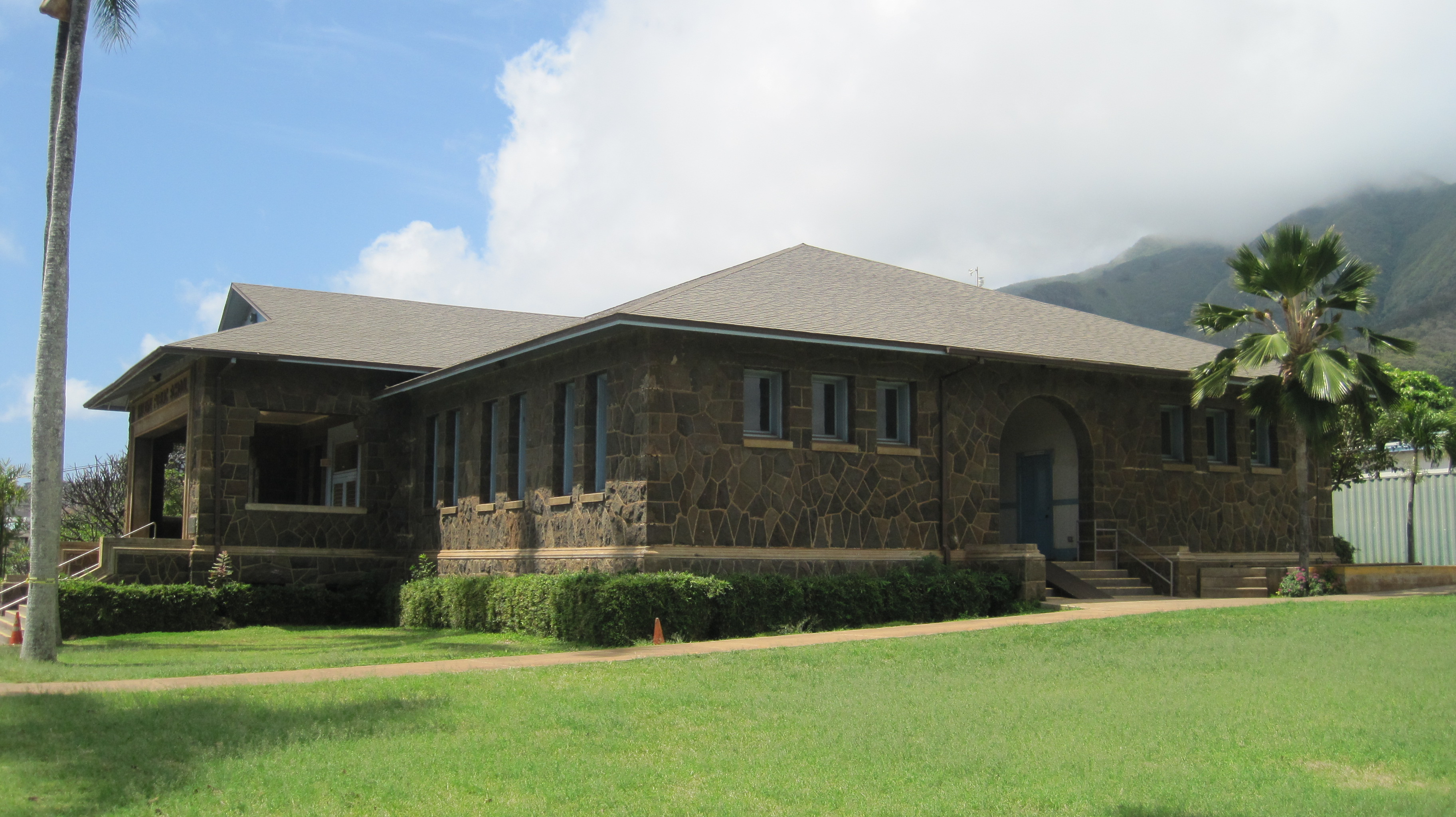
- Wailuku Elementary School main building

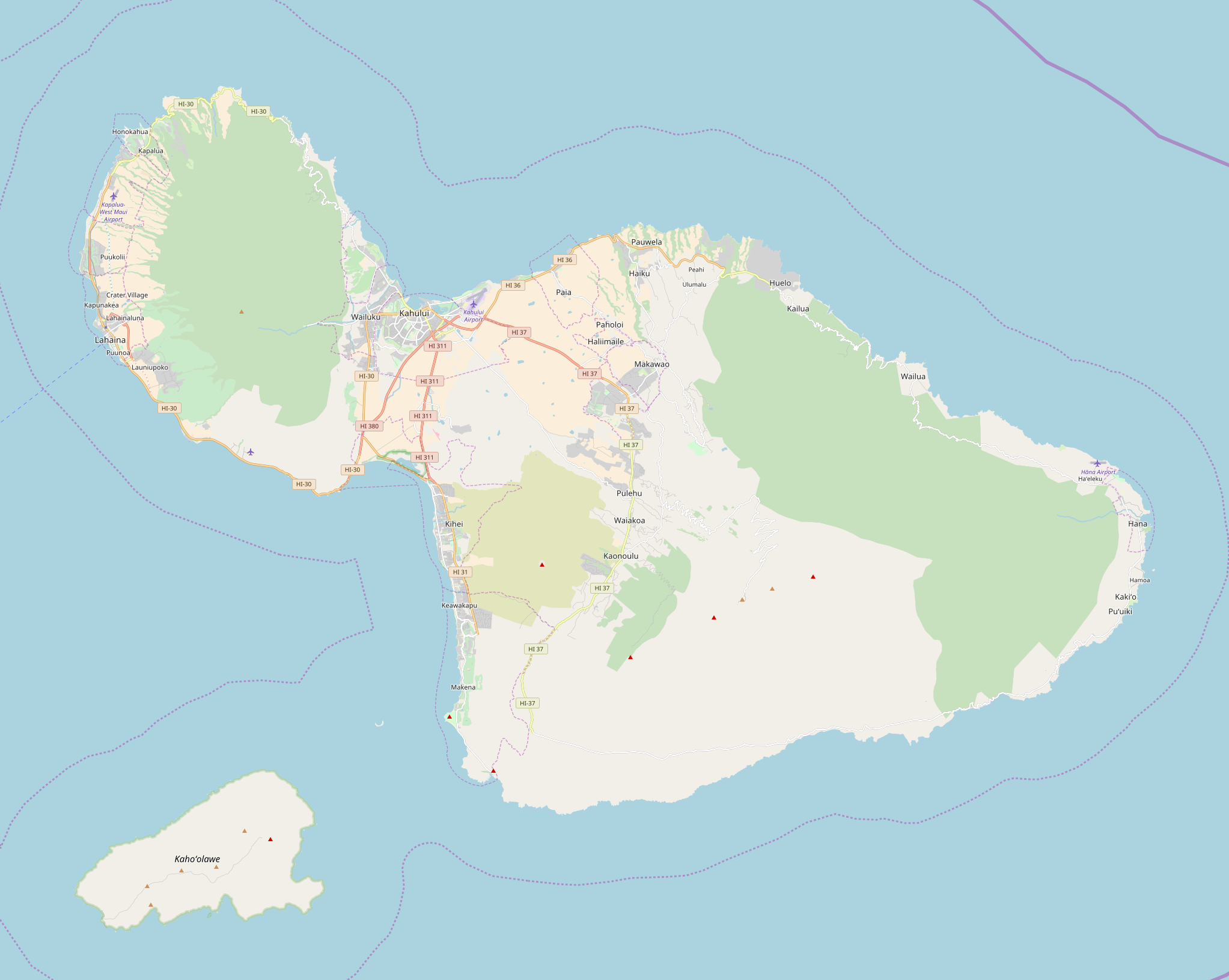
- Location within Maui Location within Hawaii
- Location: 355 South High Street; Wailuku, Hawaii
- Coordinates: 20°53′17″N 156°30′29″W
- Area: 4.24 acres (1.72 ha)
- Built: 1904
- Architect: C.W. Dickey
- MPS: Maui Public Schools MPS
- NRHP reference No.: 00000666
- HRHP No.: 50-50-04-01630

Significant dates
- Added to NRHP: 30 June 2000
- Designated HRHP: June 2, 1992

Wailuku Elementary School is a public elementary school operated by the Hawaii Department of Education, occupying a historic school building in Wailuku, Hawaii.

At the time Wailuku School was dedicated in May 1904 (as Wailuku Public School, renamed Wailuku Elementary School in 1928), it was described as "the handsomest school building on the island or perhaps the country." Designed by one of the Territory of Hawaiʻi's most prominent architects, C.W. Dickey (then in partnership with E.A.P. Newcomb), it remains the only stone school building in Maui. It was added to the National Register of Historic Places on 30 June 2000.

On 21 May 1904 Territorial Senator Henry Perrine Baldwin laid the cornerstone and buried a cast iron time capsule containing an 1866 copy of the Daily Hawaiian Herald (whose most famous reporter was Mark Twain) and other publications from the era, along with an assortment of U.S. and Hawaiian coins and postage stamps. The time capsule was unearthed on 21 April 2004.

The royal palms that line the driveway were planted on Arbor Day in 1905, the old wooden schoolhouse was torn down in 1907, and new classrooms of concrete block were added in 1951. During World War II, the U.S. Army commandeered the building, forcing classes to be held in nearby churches and community buildings.

== Gallery ==
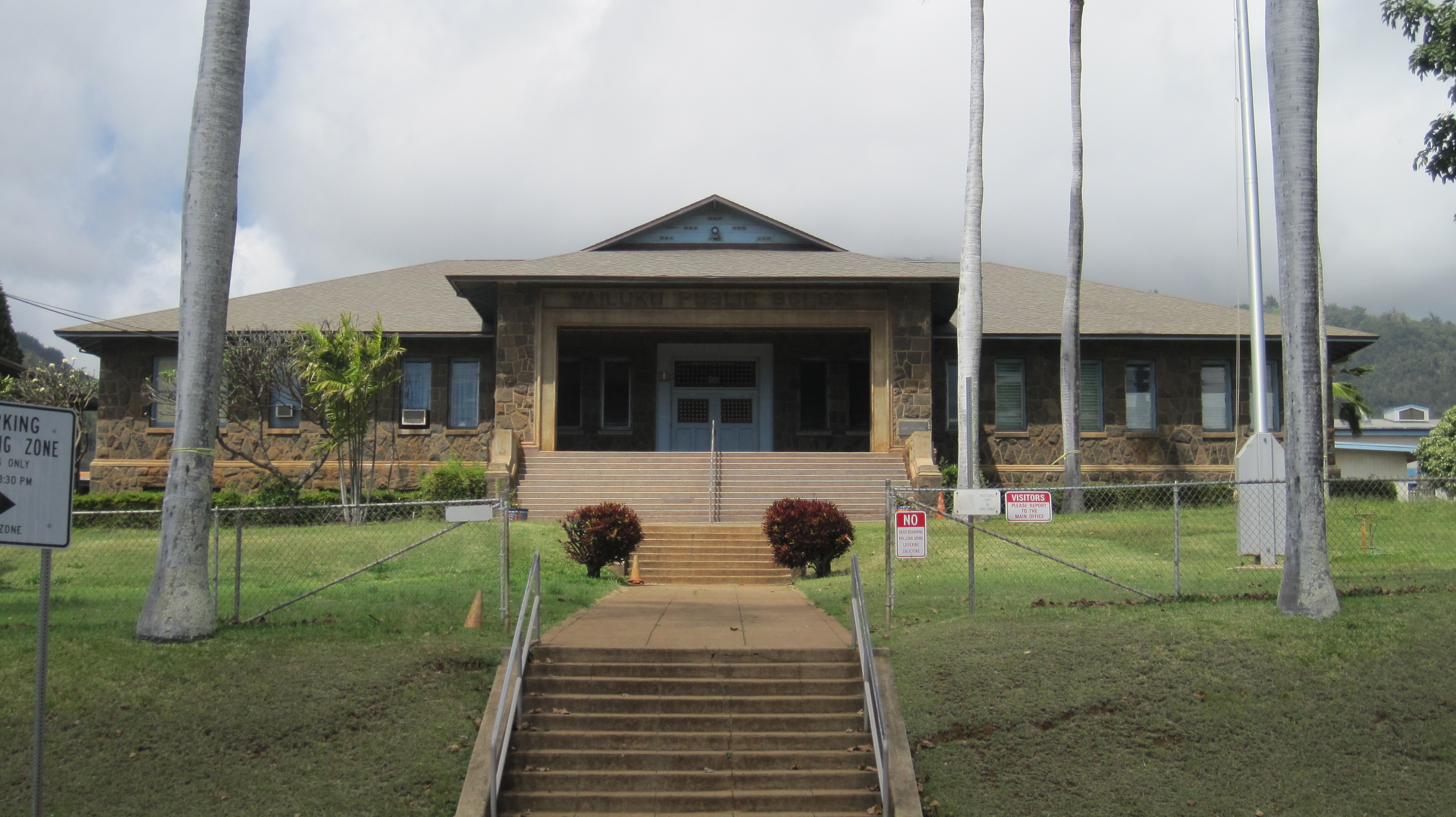
Front view

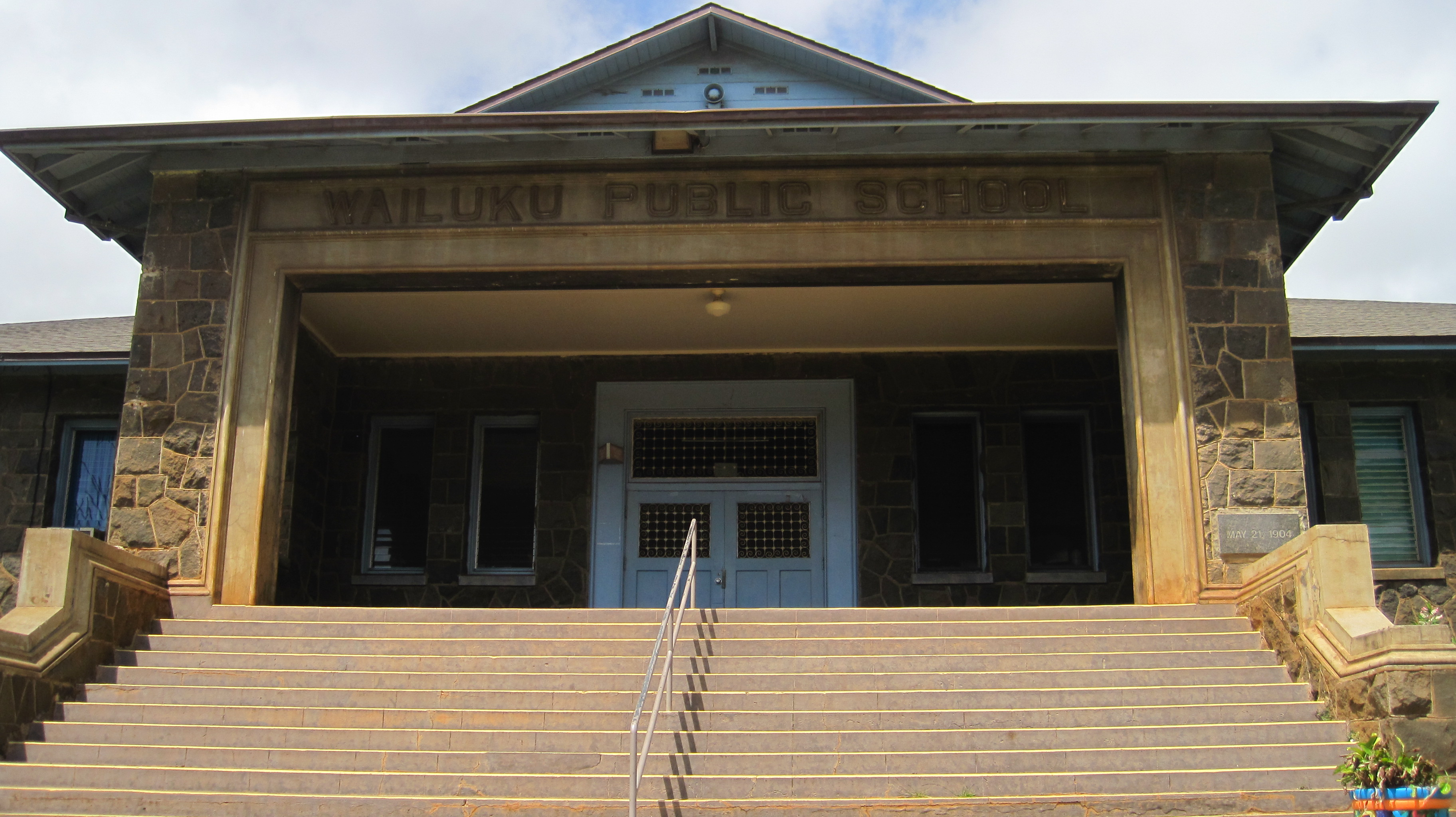
Front steps
