= Modern Theatre (Boston) =

Theater in Boston (1914–2009)

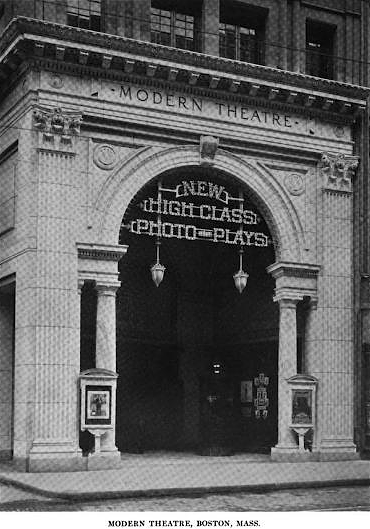
- (1915)
- Interactive map of Modern Theatre
- Address: 525 Washington Street, Boston, MA 02111
- Coordinates: 42°21′15″N 71°03′44″W
- Owner: Suffolk University
- Capacity: 185
- Type: Theatre

Construction
- Opened: 1876
- Renovated: 1914, 2010
- Architects: Levi Newcomb (original); Clarence H. Blackall (conversion); Childs Bertman Tseckares (renovation)

Website
- https://sites.suffolk.edu/moderntheatre/

Boston Landmark
- Designated: June 25, 2002

The Modern Theatre (Note: Under some operators the name was spelled "Modern Theater".) is located on Washington Street in downtown Boston, Massachusetts. It opened as a movie theater in 1914 in a former commercial building that had been repurposed by noted theater architect Clarence H. Blackall. In 2009 Suffolk University demolished the long-vacant building after removing and storing the facade, and constructed a new building on the site. Suffolk's new Modern Theatre opened on November 4, 2010.

The theater is part of the Washington Street Theatre District, which was placed on the National Register of Historic Places in 1979. The theater was also designated as a Boston Landmark by the Boston Landmarks Commission in 2002.

== History ==
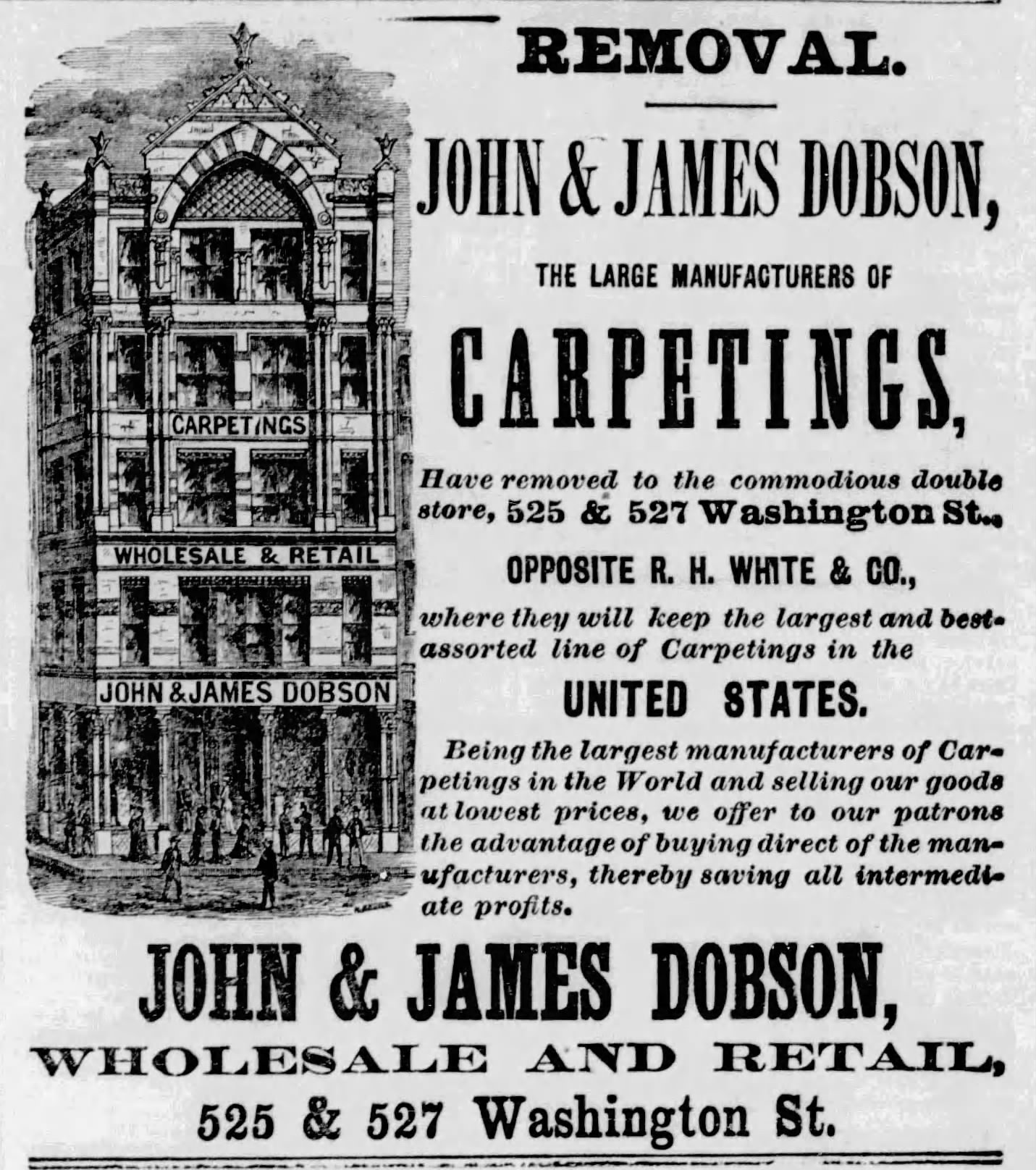
Notice in the Boston Evening Transcript, March 30, 1878

In 1876, Boston architect Levi Newcomb designed a warehouse and showroom for John and James Dobson, owners of the largest carpet mills in the United States. The five-story High Victorian Gothic building was constructed of Ohio sandstone with cast-iron store-fronts on the ground floor. The Dobsons relocated from the Blackstone National Bank building in early 1878.

Boston businessman George White hired Clarence H. Blackall in 1913 to convert the basement and first two floors into a theater for the newly popular photo-plays. The architect's plan for the first floor shows a vestibule with a circular ticket office and a small lobby opening onto a long, narrow auditorium with a balcony, seating about 800 in total. There was a small stage, with an adjoining dressing room, and an orchestra pit, which contained an Estey organ with three manuals and thirty-three ranks of pipes. Acoustic design for the auditorium was done in consultation with Wallace C. Sabine, a professor of physics at Harvard University and a pioneer in architectural acoustics. The interior decoration, described as Florentine Renaissance, used Italian marble, dark mahogany and ersatz tapestry. Blackall also added a neoclassical facade carved from white Vermont marble.

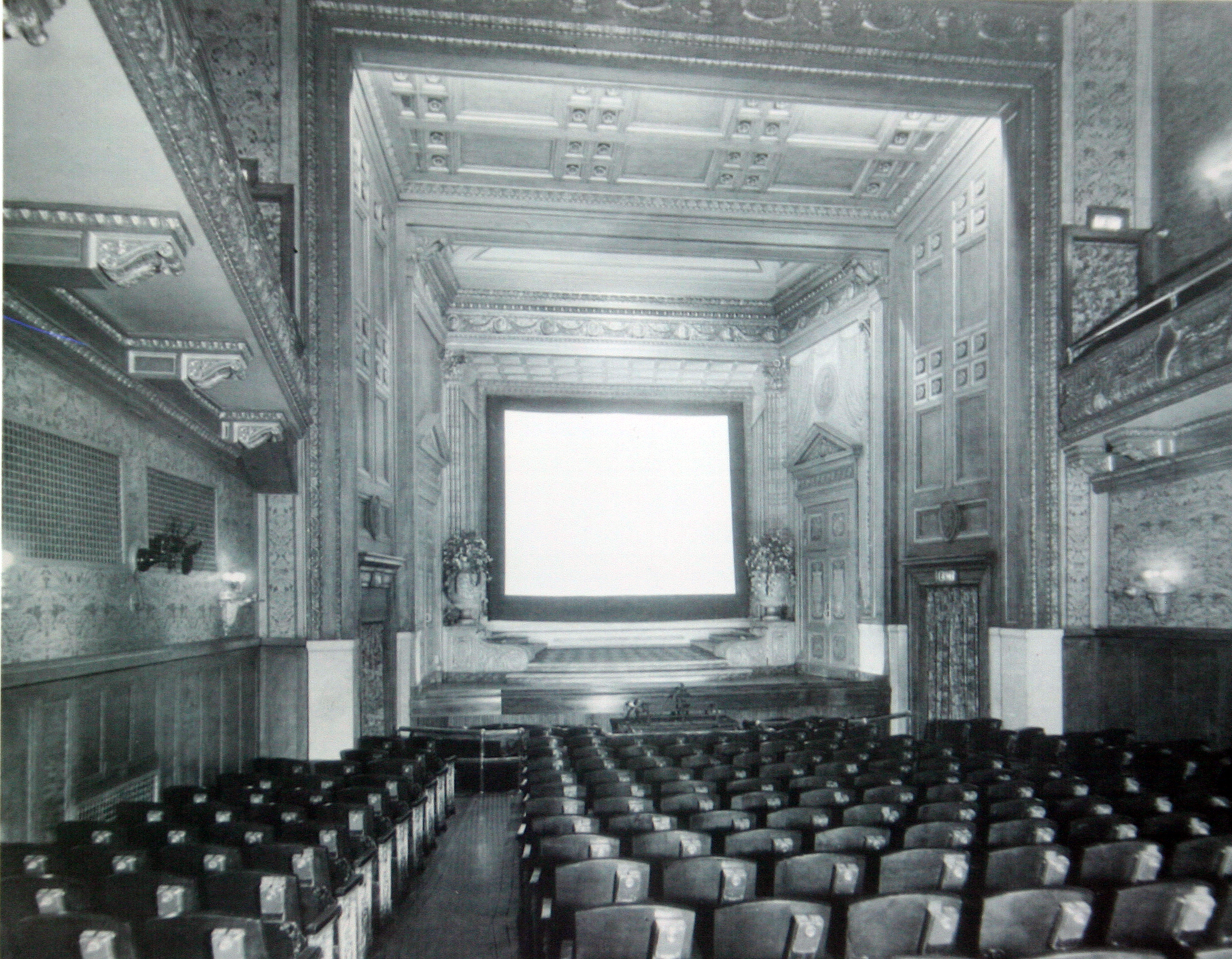
Interior of the Modern Theatre, Boston, circa 1920

The theater was air-conditioned, as reported by the Boston Evening Transcript:

A most elaborate system of heating and cooling has been installed. An artesian well has been driven to a depth of nearly 600 feet below the street level, and a supply of over 100 gallons per minute of fresh, cold water has been obtained. This water will be pumped to the surface and used to cool and wash the air, which in winter time will be reheated and sent by means of fans to all parts of the house. In warm weather the air will be cooled in such a manner that the temperature can be maintained at 70 degrees even in the hottest weather outside.

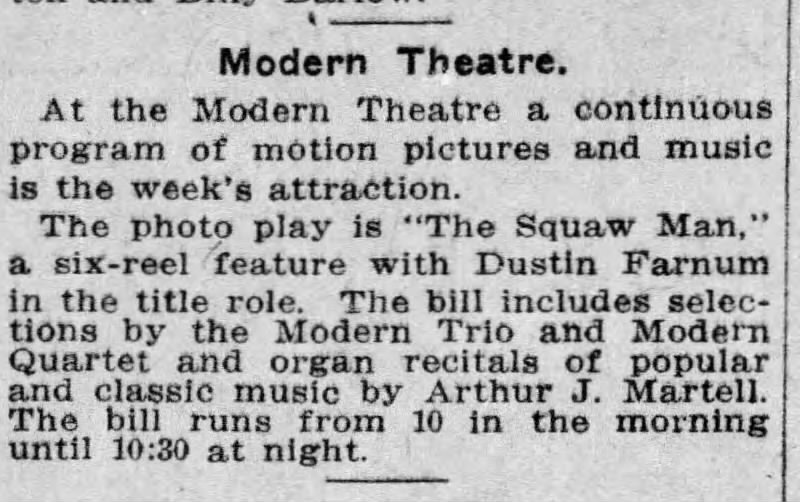
Notice in The Boston Globe, June 30, 1914

The Modern Theatre, believed to be the first in Boston designed specifically for movies, (Note: Other theaters were vaudeville houses with movie screens.) was opened on June 25, 1914, by Boston theater entrepreneur Jacob Lourie, with programs of silent films, vocal music performances and organ recitals. In 1927, Lourie installed Vitaphone equipment for a showing of Don Juan. (Note: This is believed to be the first permanent Vitaphone installation in Boston; the Colonial Theatre was using temporary equipment in 1926.) The next year the Modern programmed The Jazz Singer, the first feature-length Vitaphone movie with both music and spoken dialogue.

Renamed the Mayflower Theatre in 1949, by the 1970s it was, like other theaters in the area, showing adult films. (Note: In 1976, the Mayflower was fined $16,225 in Boston Municipal Court on charges of showing three obscene films.) The Mayflower closed in 1976 and fell into neglect.

In 1977, David L. Archer, a 28-year-old actor and producer, began to renovate the theater for use as a community performance space. On December 12, 1978, the Modern Theater, operating again under its original name, opened with a 12-day engagement by Sun Ra and The Arkestra. (Note: The show included Bill Sebastian playing his Outer Space Visual Communicator (OVC), a type of color organ.) Archer programmed a mix of stage events and music, including performances by notable jazz artists Cecil Taylor and Herbie Mann, the annual Boston Mime Week, and David Mamet’s drama, American Buffalo. However, the venture was short-lived, and the Modern Theater closed in May, 1981, after hosting over 200 events.

After several changes of ownership but with no progress on restoration, Suffolk University purchased the property in 2007, with plans to increase their stock of student housing. In 2009 they demolished the building after carefully removing the facade. CBT Architects of Boston designed a new state-of-the-art theater with a ten-story residence hall above it. The conserved original facade was attached to the new building. Suffolk's new Modern Theatre, a multi-purpose space seating 185, opened on November 4, 2010.

The National Trust for Historic Preservation presented the Modern Theatre at Suffolk University with the 2011 Preservation Honor Award for contributions to the Lower Washington Street Revitalization initiative.

== Gallery ==
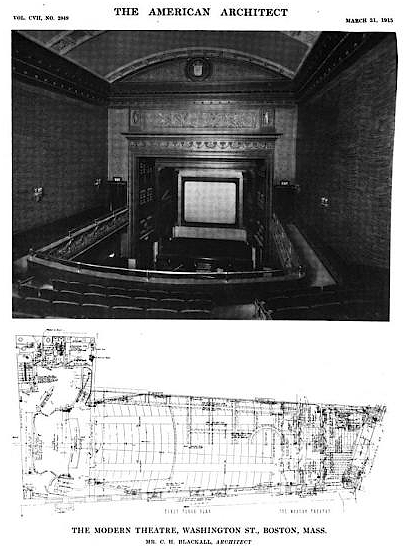
Interior, 1915

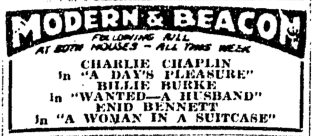
Advertisement for Modern and Beacon Theatre, 1920; both run by Jacob Lourie

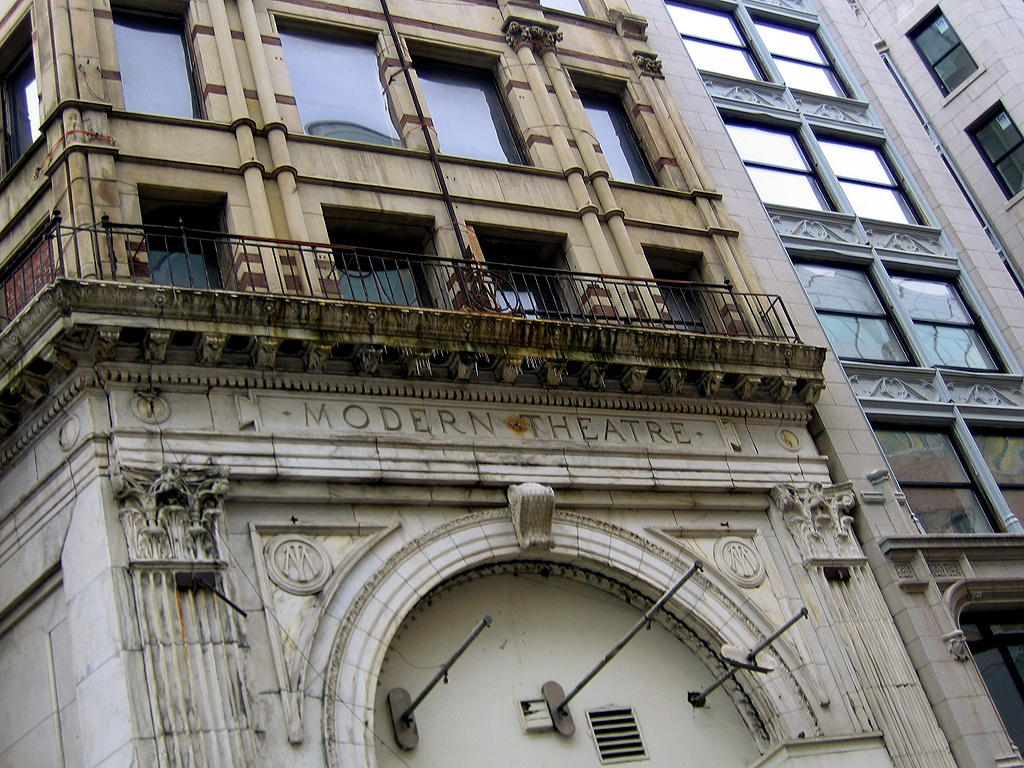
2007

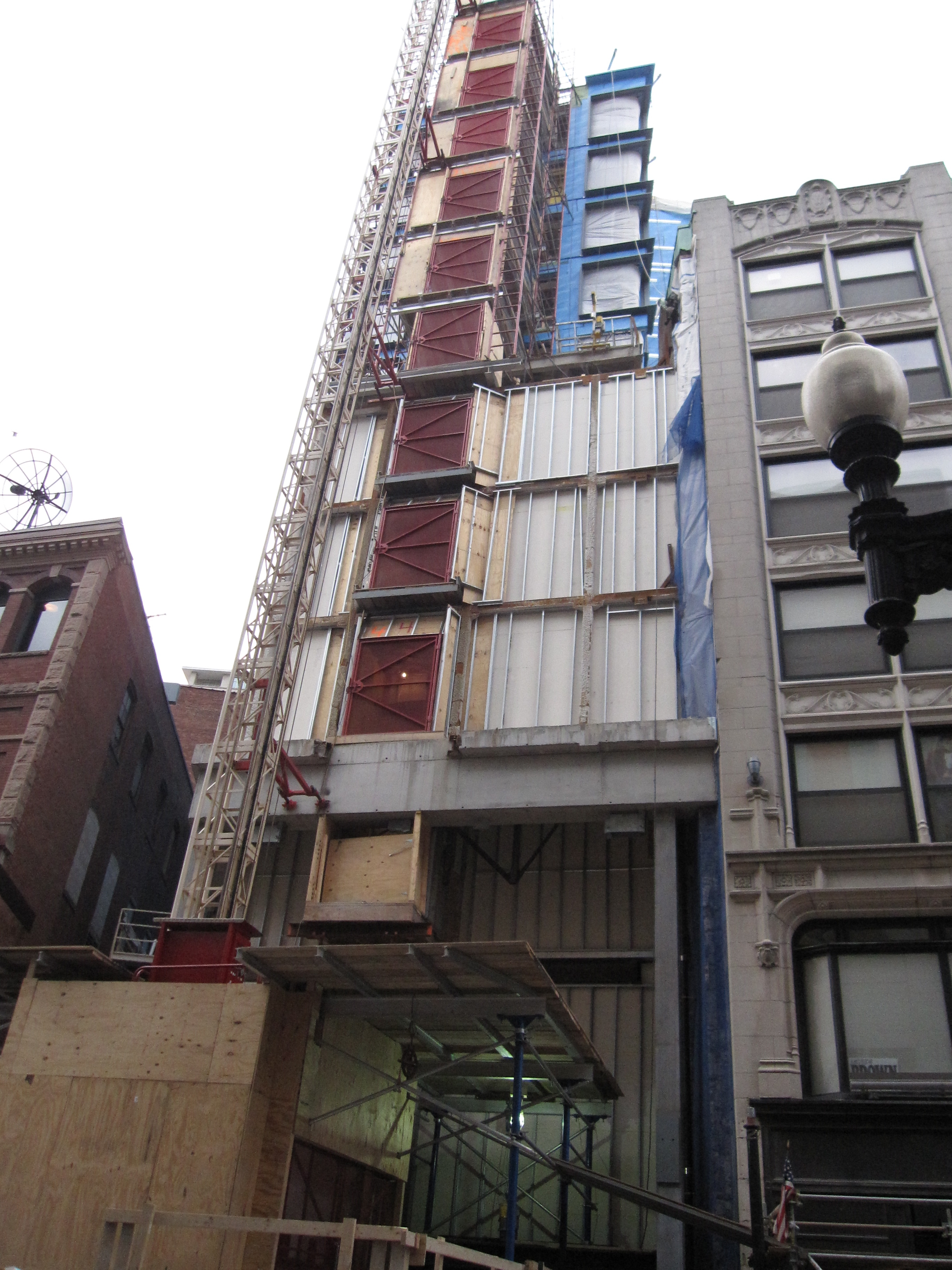
Modern Theatre during renovation, February 2010

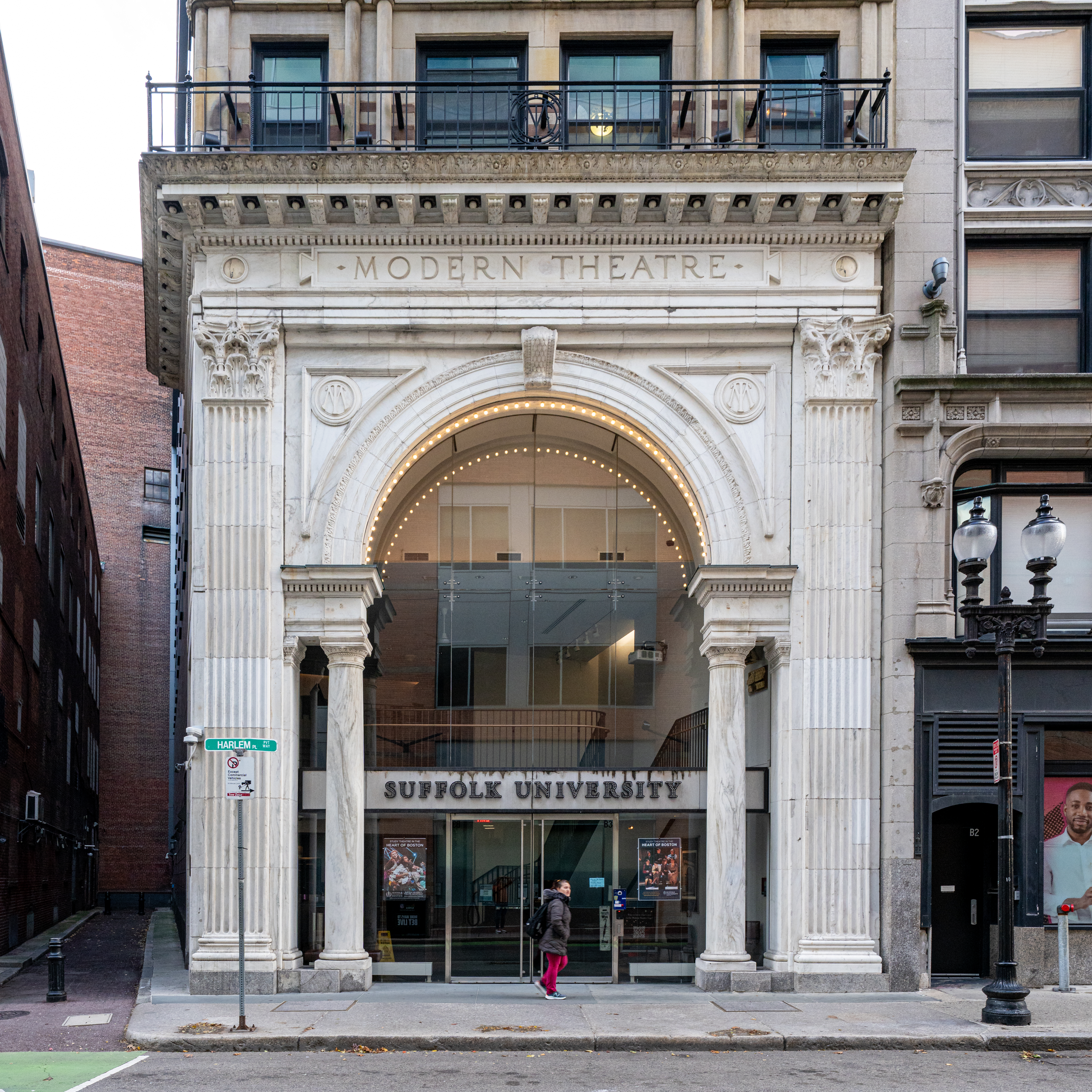
2025
