= Edgar Allen Poe Newcomb =

Architect and music composer

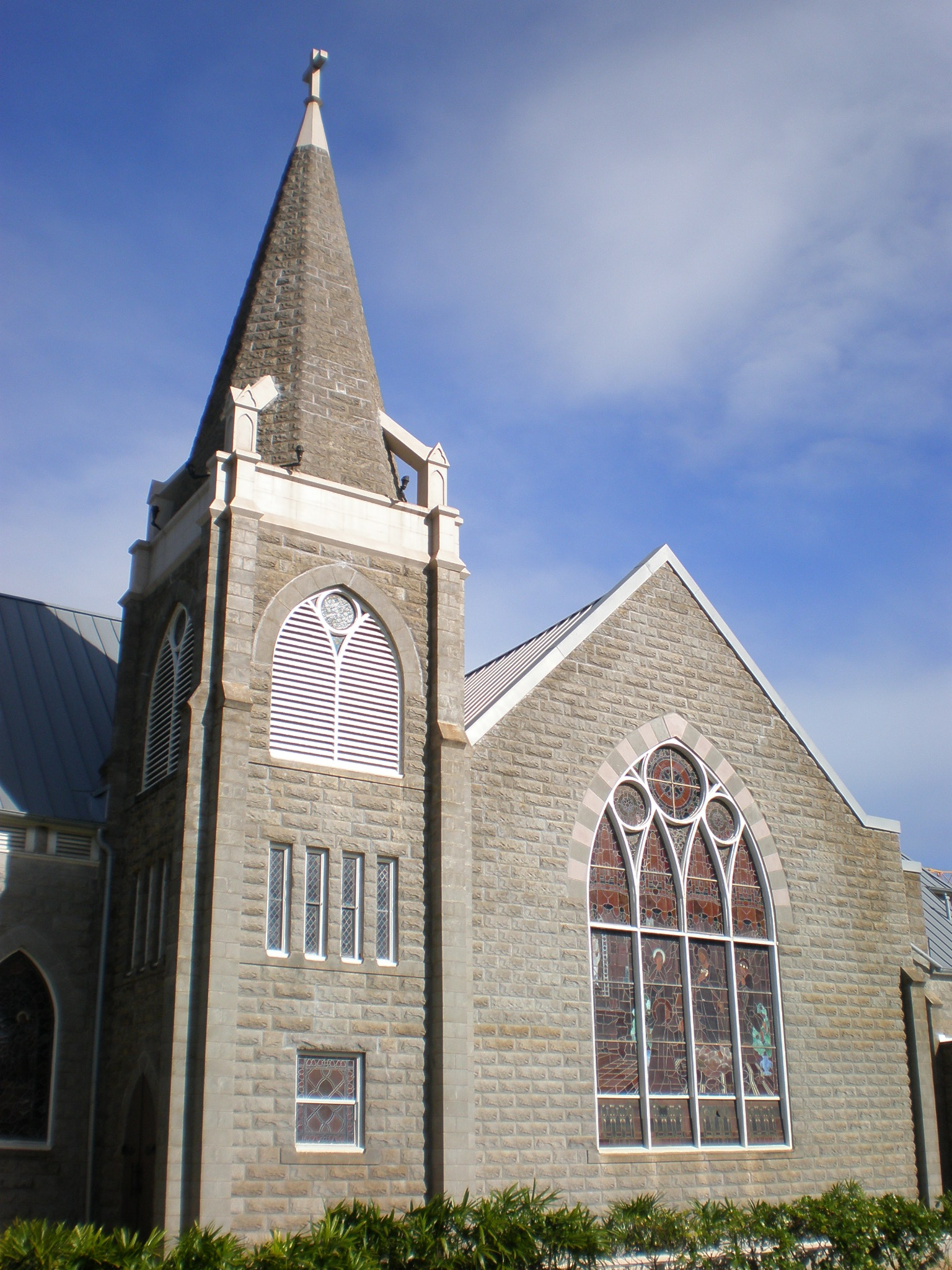
- Sacred Heart Church-Punahou designed by Newcomb
- Born: April 23, 1846; Boston, Massachusetts
- Died: November 10, 1923 (aged 77); Moana Hotel, Honolulu, Hawaii
- Occupation: Architect
- Practice: L. Newcomb & Son, Boston; Dickey & Newcomb, Honolulu

Edgar Allen Poe Newcomb (April 23, 1846 – November 10, 1923) was an architect, also known as E. A. P. Newcomb and Edgar A. P. Newcomb. The majority of his accomplishments were in Boston and Honolulu. Newcomb was also a bass vocalist who composed dozens of songs and at least one opera.

== Initial success ==
He was born in Boston, Massachusetts, on April 23, 1846, to Levi Newcomb and his wife Sarah Ann. Edgar Allen Poe Newcomb was the nephew of sculptor Thomas Ball. While a student at Ogdensburg Free Academy in New York, he dropped out of school at age 16 to learn the architecture business from his father.

The first three decades of his architectural career were with his father's firm L. Newcomb & Son in Boston. He was interested in religious architecture and twice toured Europe visiting the cathedrals. During his association with L. Newcomb & Son, the firm is credited as designing the following (partial listing):

- Boston & Lowell Railroad Station (Northern Union Station of Boston)
- Memorial Hall at Bowdoin College
- Dormitory at Tuft's College
- Felton Hall dormitory at Cambridge
- First Baptist Church of Portland, Maine
- Numerous residences in Buffalo and St. Louis
- First Baptist Church, Haverhill, Massachusetts
- Sanitarium an Andover, Massachusetts
- Hotel Bristol

== Hawaii ==
He moved to Honolulu in 1901 and joined with Charles William Dickey to form the Dickey & Newcomb firm. During 1901, he is credited with designing the following Honolulu structures:

- Bishop Hall, Punahou School Campus
- Sacred Heart Convent School, Fort Street
- Arthur C. Alexander residence, Bishop St. and Aolani Road
- Hale Paahaua, King St. at Punchbowl and Likelike St.
- St. Clement's Chapel and Parsonage
- P. M. Pond residence, Kamehameha Ave. near McKinley St.
- H. Waterhouse residence, 1641 Nuuanu
- T. Clive Davies residence, Nuuanu, southeast corner of Judd St.
- Judge Humphries residence, Nuuanu, southeast corner of Judd St.

The architectural partnership received favorable coverage in the media. Newcomb gave a presentation at the Honolulu YWCA, drawing a correlation between a culture's headwear and its architecture.

In 1902, Newcomb returned to New York for what he believed would be a matter of months, to design a home for S. S. Spaulding of Buffalo, New York. He ended up staying almost two years. He returned with his sister Sarah Newcomb, and gave a lengthy interview about the United States interest in Hawaii. A local civic club held its meeting in Newcomb's home in 1904, listening to a presentation of his vision for beautification and improvement of Honolulu. Resuming his practice with Dickey, Newcomb designed the following buildings:

- Territorial Normal School, Honolulu
- Mrs. Fanny Lane residence, Kewalo and Heulu St., Honolulu
- Alfred Hocking House, Kewalo and Wowehi St., Honolulu
- C. Du Roi residence, Liliha St. near Wyllie, Honolulu
- Wailuku School on Maui

In 1905, Newcomb and his sister once again returned to the mainland United States. During his sojourn, he gave an interview to a Manchester, New Hampshire, newspaper, extolling the beauty of Hawaii.

== Later work ==
Newcomb was selected, along with Edward Lippincott Tilton, to design the Carpenter Memorial Library in Manchester, New Hampshire. The cornerstone was laid in 1913, and the dedication of the building was on November 18, 1914.

He designed the Sacred Heart Church-Punahou in Honolulu at 1701 Wilder Avenue in 1914. It was added to the National Register of Historic Places in 2001.

== Music ==
Newcomb was a bass vocalist who participated in choral performances. He is sometimes listed as E. A. P. Newcomb. He was also known as a musician and songwriter, and sometimes listed as Edgar A. P. Newcomb. In 1891, he wrote the music to "Slumber Song" and "The Sweet Tum Tum", words by Arthur Macy. Among his other songs were "Hawaii" and the hymn "Come Unto Me". He composed over 50 songs, as well as the opera Betty.

== Death ==
Following a lengthy illness, Newcomb died November 10, 1923, at the Moana Hotel in Waikiki. His only survivor was his sister Sarah. The Reverend Canon John Usborne officiated over the services at the hotel. Following cremation, Newcomb's ashes were interred at Nuuanu Cemetery.
