= Beacon Theatre (Boston) =

Coordinates: 42°21′28.88″N 71°3′37.62″W

The Beacon Theatre was a cinema on Tremont Street in Boston, Massachusetts built in 1910 and closed in 1948. Jacob Lourie established it. Architect Clarence Blackall designed the building, with its 500-seat auditorium which a contemporary critic described as "showy." It had a staff of 26 in 1910. In 1948 the "refurbished" building became the Beacon Hill Theater. The building existed until 1970.

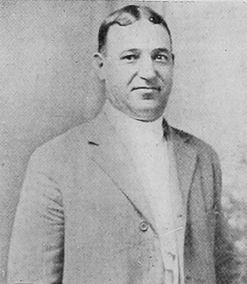
Portrait of Jacob Lourie, 1913, manager

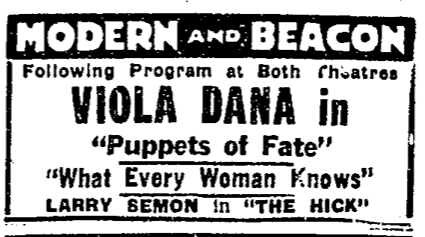
Advertisement for Modern Theatre and Beacon Theatre, 1921; both run by Jacob Lourie
