= Crazy Shirts =

American T-shirt and clothing company

- Type: Private
- Industry: Retail
- Founded: 1964
- Headquarters: Honolulu, Hawaii
- Number of locations: 35 retail stores
- Products: Shirts, Shorts, Sweaters, Hats, Footwear, Accessories
- Number of employees: 400+
- Website: www.crazyshirts.com

Crazy Shirts is an American T-shirt and clothing company established in 1964 and based in Honolulu, Hawaii. The company operates 35 retail stores in Hawaii, California, Florida, Nevada, and Colorado. Crazy Shirts houses the largest printing facility in Hawaiʻi, on the island of Oʻahu, and employs more than 400 employees.

== History ==
Frederick Carleton “Rick” Ralston is associated with transforming T-shirts from underwear into outerwear. Reporter Sharon Nelton of BNET titled Ralston as “the T-shirt king of America and the father of the modern T-shirt.” In the summer of 1960, as a teenager just out of high school in Montebello, California, Ralston spray-painted a design on a T-shirt. Ralston took this idea and traveled to Santa Catalina Island with a friend, referred to as “Crazy Arab” to spray-paint designs on beach towels.

Rick Ralston had been designing his towel on a worn out T-shirt, which he then referred to as "an ugly monster shape." One day, while wearing it down the street, a tourist offered to buy the shirt off of his back for their daughter. Rick Ralston made the decision right then and there to go into the T-shirt business.

In 1960, Ralston and friends set up a shop on the sidewalk of Santa Catalina Island. Tourists had to bring their own blank T-shirts from a local sporting goods shop, and Ralston and “Crazy Arab” embellished them with depictions of monsters, surfers or hot rods at $2.80 a piece, sometimes making as much as $100 a day.

In 1962, after another summer on Santa Catalina Island and two years studying automotive design at the Art Center College of Design in Pasadena, CA, Ralston took his summer business to the sidewalks of Waikīkī in Oahu, Hawaii, where the summer’s tourism season provided him with sustainable income.

In 1964, he opened a tiny shop in the Waikīkī bazaar known as the International Market Place. The shop was called Ricky’s Crazy Shirts, and, to Ralston’s knowledge, it was the first store ever devoted exclusively to T-shirts and sweatshirts. Due to the popularity of the T-shirt designs among tourists, Ralston needed to increase production speed, and he turned from spray-painting to screen-printing the designs. Later that year, Ralston changed the shop’s name from Ricky’s Crazy Shirts to Crazy Shirts. In 1970, Ralston opened a second shop in Honolulu’s Ala Moana shopping center. The company’s sales at that time were about $500,000.

Crazy Shirts expanded during the 1990s with more than 70 stores across the U.S., but in September 2001, the company closed four stores and filed for bankruptcy. In November 2001, Only The Best Inc., a company affiliated with the owners of Waikiki Trader Corp, bought the company.

== Crazy Shirts today ==
In October 2001, Mark Hollander became president and chief executive officer of Crazy Shirts Hawaii, taking over from Rick Ralston. Hollander was part of the investor group that bought Crazy Shirts.

Under the new leadership, Crazy Shirts expanded in new untapped markets across the nation, such as South Carolina and Santa Barbara and moved its production facility from California back to Hawaii. The move created over 50 new jobs in Hawaii and unified all of the company’s production-related activities, including artwork and catalog production.

In the 1970s, the Crazy Shirts line included about 150 designs. Since then, they have changed production technology and today more than 550 designs are available.

Hollander currently oversees the operations of the company’s retail locations across the country, as well as the production facility and administrative offices in Halawa Valley, on the island of Oahu, Hawaii.

Current Store Locations:

- Hawaii
  - Oahu
  - Kauai
  - Maui
  - Hawaii
- California
  - San Francisco
  - Sausalito
  - San Diego
  - Laguna Beach
  - Huntington Beach
  - Palm Springs
- Colorado
  - Vail
- Florida
  - Sarasota
  - Key West
- Nevada
  - Las Vegas

== Specialty dyes ==
Crazy Shirts is known for using specialty dyes that includes their garments in natural and unique dyes such as wine, beer, bubble gum, chili, chocolate and Kona coffee. The current specialty dyes include:

- Beer
- Blackberry
- Blueberry
- Blue Hawaii
- Cherry
- Chile
- Chocolate
- Coconut
- Crater Dyed®
- Green Apple
- Hemp
- Key Lime
- Kona Coffee
- Lavender
- Paradise Red
- Pine
- Pineapple
- Root Beer
- Wine

== Design lines ==
“Crazy Classics” T-shirt line – Crazy Shirts revives some of its most popular designs each season. Designs are made available on a limited-edition basis and based on customer demand.

Kliban Cat Designs – Crazy Shirts once held the exclusive clothing rights to the cartoon created by cartoonist B. ‘Hap’ Kliban. The “Kliban Cat” first appeared on a Crazy Shirt in 1977. Images include Hula Cat with hips swaying and adorned in a grass hula skirt and lei, Aloha Cat wearing an aloha shirt and open arms, Sumo Cat dressed in the traditional mawashi (wrestling belt), and Artist Cat sitting at his easel covered in paint. This partnership ended in 2024.

Obama Surfs – In November 2008, Crazy Shirts honored the Hawaii-born president elect, Barack Obama with the release of its “Obama Surfs” white crew neck T-shirt. The front new “Obama Surfs” T-shirt reads “Life, Liberty and the Pursuit of Happiness, President Obama 2009,” alongside a wave-riding bodysurfer and the Hawaiian Island chain, while “Obama Surfs” over a barreling wave is printed on the back.

Wyland Partnership – In December 2008, Crazy Shirts and Wyland, marine life artist, have partnered to create an exclusive line of apparel inspired by the artist’s works. The signature Wyland designs include “Big Whale,” which features a mother and baby whale on a blue T-shirt, along with a humpback whale tail in brush ink, and “Get Involved” dolphins, which is printed with the words: “Re-Think, Re-Cycle, Re-Use.” A portion of the proceeds goes to Wyland Foundation's clean water initiative.

== Community leadership ==
Crazy Shirts supports many of Hawaii's community and non-profit organizations. Over the years, their involvement has included:

- Hawaiian Humane Society – Crazy Shirts has been actively involved in the Adopt-a-Cat, Adopt-a-Dog and other Hawaiian Human Society projects. Annually, they donate a Crazy Shirts original shirt design and product, with a portion of the proceeds going to the organization.
- Polynesian Voyaging Society – Crazy Shirts provided the official Polynesian Voyaging Society – Hokulea crew shirt, working with the team members to develop a special UV protective garment.
- AccesSurf Hawaii – In partnership with Crocs, Crazy Shirts designed a limited-edition shoe called the “Island Lifeguard” which is sold exclusively through select Crazy Shirts retail locations and its website. To complement the shoes, Crazy Shirts designed an “Island Lifeguard” T-shirt. Proceeds from these products benefited AccesSurf Hawaii, Hawaii-based non-profit organization created to provide access to water sports to those with mental or physical challenges using specialized equipment, and the Hawaii Junior Lifeguard programs.
- Hawaii Natural Energy Institute (HNEI) – In May 2007, the company launched a product line titled “Save our Planet.” Crazy Shirts created this line in the hopes to spark conversation, raise public awareness, and encourage individuals to take steps toward environmental conservation and sustainability. Crazy Shirts donates a portion of the sales from all of its global warming products to the Hawaii Natural Energy Institute (HNEI), a research unit of the University of Hawaii that conducts research to find new forms of energy to replace the United States dependence on fossil fuels.
