= Our Lady of the Mount Catholic Church (Honolulu) =

Our Lady of the Mount Church
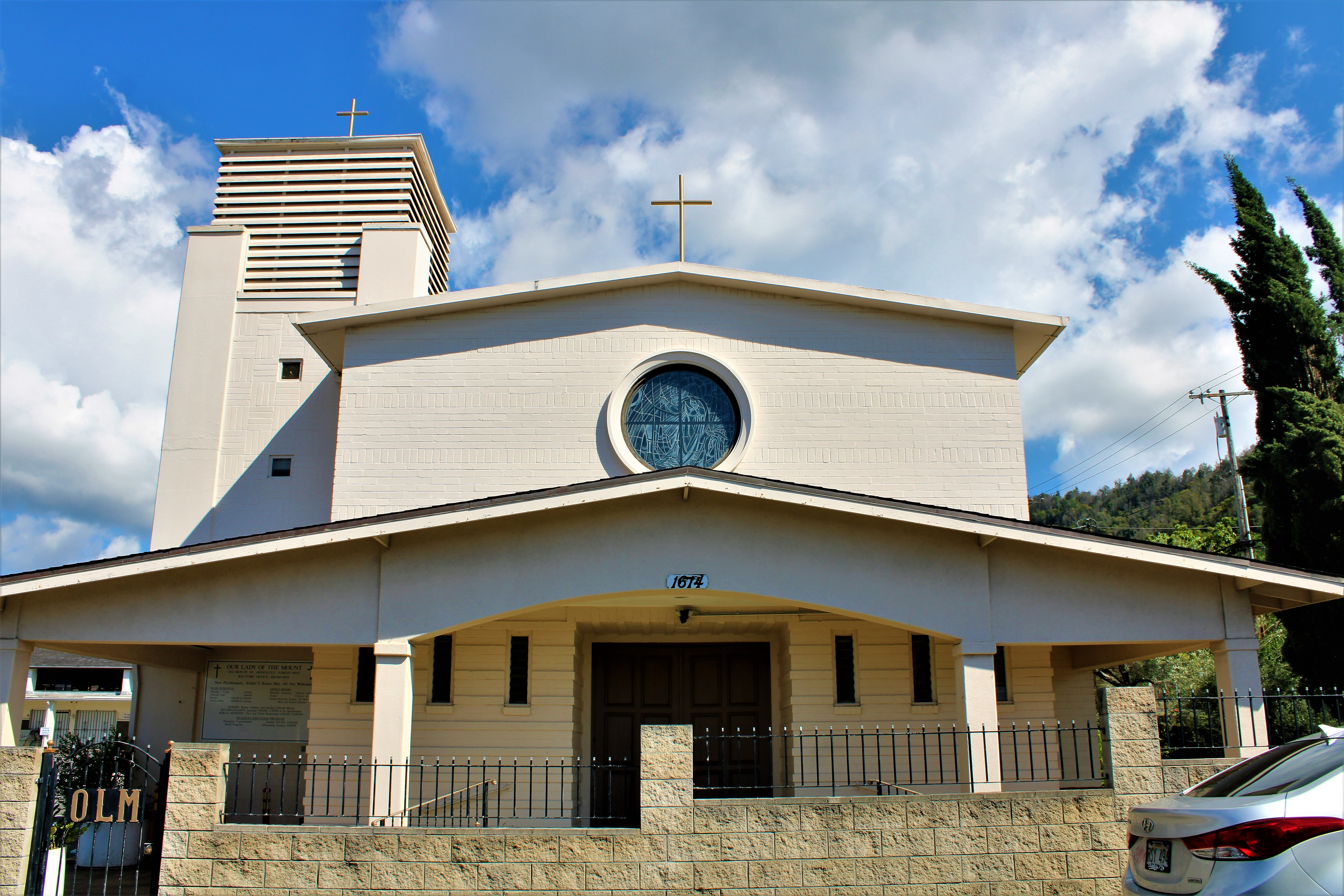
- Our Lady of the Mount Church
- Our Lady of the Mount Church
- 21.3458°N 157.8608°W
- Country: USA
- Denomination: Roman Catholic
- Website: ourladyofthemountkalihi.org

History
- Founded: 1870

Administration
- Diocese: Diocese of Honolulu

Our Lady of the Mount Catholic Church in Honolulu is a parish of the Roman Catholic Church of Hawaii in the United States. It falls under the jurisdiction of the Diocese of Honolulu and its bishop. Located in the Kalihi Valley neighborhood community, it once served the immigrant Portuguese pineapple and sugarcane plantation laborers of the early 20th century. They dedicated their church to Nossa Sanhora do Monte or Our Lady of the Mount, in honor of the Blessed Virgin Mary.

== Resources ==
- Our Lady of the Mount Catholic Church in Honolulu
