= Levi Newcomb =

American architect (1822–1898)

- Born: February 8, 1822; Scituate, Massachusetts, U.S.
- Died: October 1, 1898 (aged 76); Scituate, Massachusetts, U.S.
- Occupation: Architect

Levi Newcomb (February 8, 1822 – October 1, 1898) was an American architect, active in Boston in the mid-to-late 19th century.

== Early life ==
Newcomb was born in 1822 in Scituate, Massachusetts, to Levi Newcomb Sr. and Joan Studley. His brother, George Lewis Newcomb, became a noted physician in Massachusetts.

== Career ==
After spending his early years at sea, Newcomb spent much of his life working as an architect in Boston, Massachusetts, with an office 12 West Street in 1869. He designed educational buildings, churches and homes. He designed Felton Hall, at Harvard University, in partnership with his son, Edgar Allen Poe Newcomb, as Levi Newcomb & Son. He also built dormitories at Tufts University and Dartmouth College, in addition to building the station of the Boston and Lowell Railroad on Causeway Street in Boston.

In 1867, he assisted with the rebuilding of Portland, Maine, after its great fire the previous year, including designing the North School, which is now listed on the National Register of Historic Places, and the now-demolished First Baptist Church on Congress Street.

== Personal life ==
Newcomb married twice. His first wife, Sarah Ann Ball, died in 1846, two years after their marriage. He then married Phoebe Ann Edwards.

== Death ==
Newcomb died in 1898, aged 76. He was interred in Groveland Cemetery in Scituate, alongside his wife.
