= Saint Theresa Catholic Church (Kekaha, Hawaii) =

Church in Hawaii, United States

Saint Theresa Catholic Church in Kekaha is a parish of the Roman Catholic Church of Hawaii in the United States. Located in Kekaha on the island of Kauai, the church falls under the jurisdiction of the Diocese of Honolulu and its bishop. It is named after Thérèse of Lisieux.

The original St. Theresa Church was blessed in January 1941. It burned down in 1977 and a new church was built on the original sight and blessed in 1979. The church was staffed by Marist priests from 1944 to 1985 when LaSalette priests took over. The Franciscan Sisters of Christian Charity of Manitowoc, Wisconsin, have worked at St. Theresa School since coming to Hawaii in 1946. The school also began in 1946. A sister was principal at St. Theresa School until 2006, when the school received its first lay principal.

Hurricane Iniki destroyed the original St. Theresa School, as well as, the rectory, convent, and church hall. The church needed a new roof and other repairs.

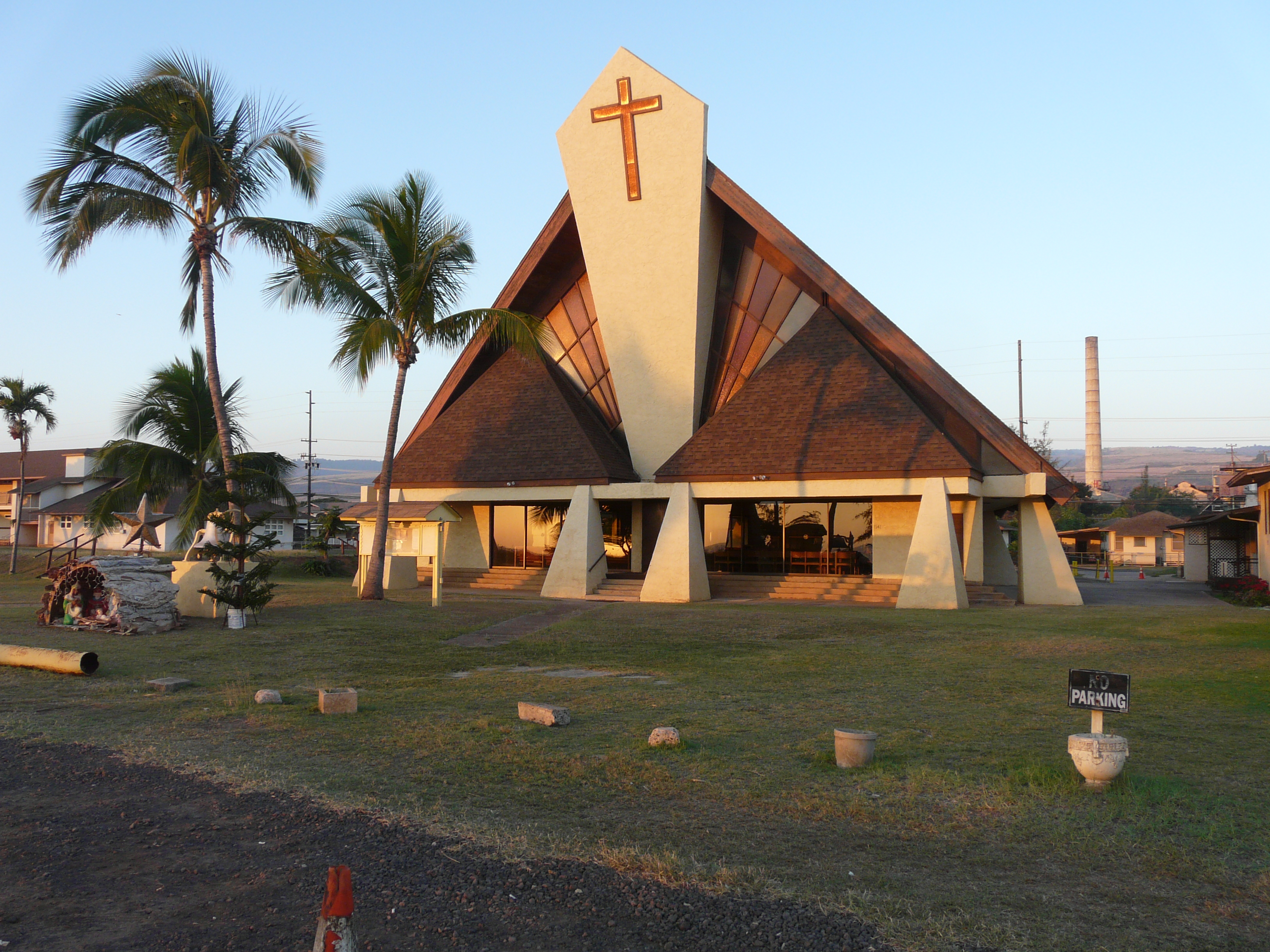
2009 photo of St. Theresa Catholic Church in Kekaha
