= Saint Mary Catholic Church (Hana, Hawaii) =

Roman Catholic parish in Hawaii, United States

Coordinates: 20.7523542°N 155.987253°W

Saint Mary Catholic Church in Hana is a parish of the Roman Catholic Church of Hawaii in the United States.

Located in Hana on the island of Maui, the church falls under the jurisdiction of the Diocese of Honolulu and its bishop. It is named after Mary, the mother of Jesus.

St. Joseph's Catholic Church at Kaupo is a Mission of St. Mary's Church.

In 2024, the church is led by Anastasio Postrano.
