= Saints Peter and Paul Catholic Church (Honolulu) =

Roman Catholic church in Honolulu, Hawaii, USA

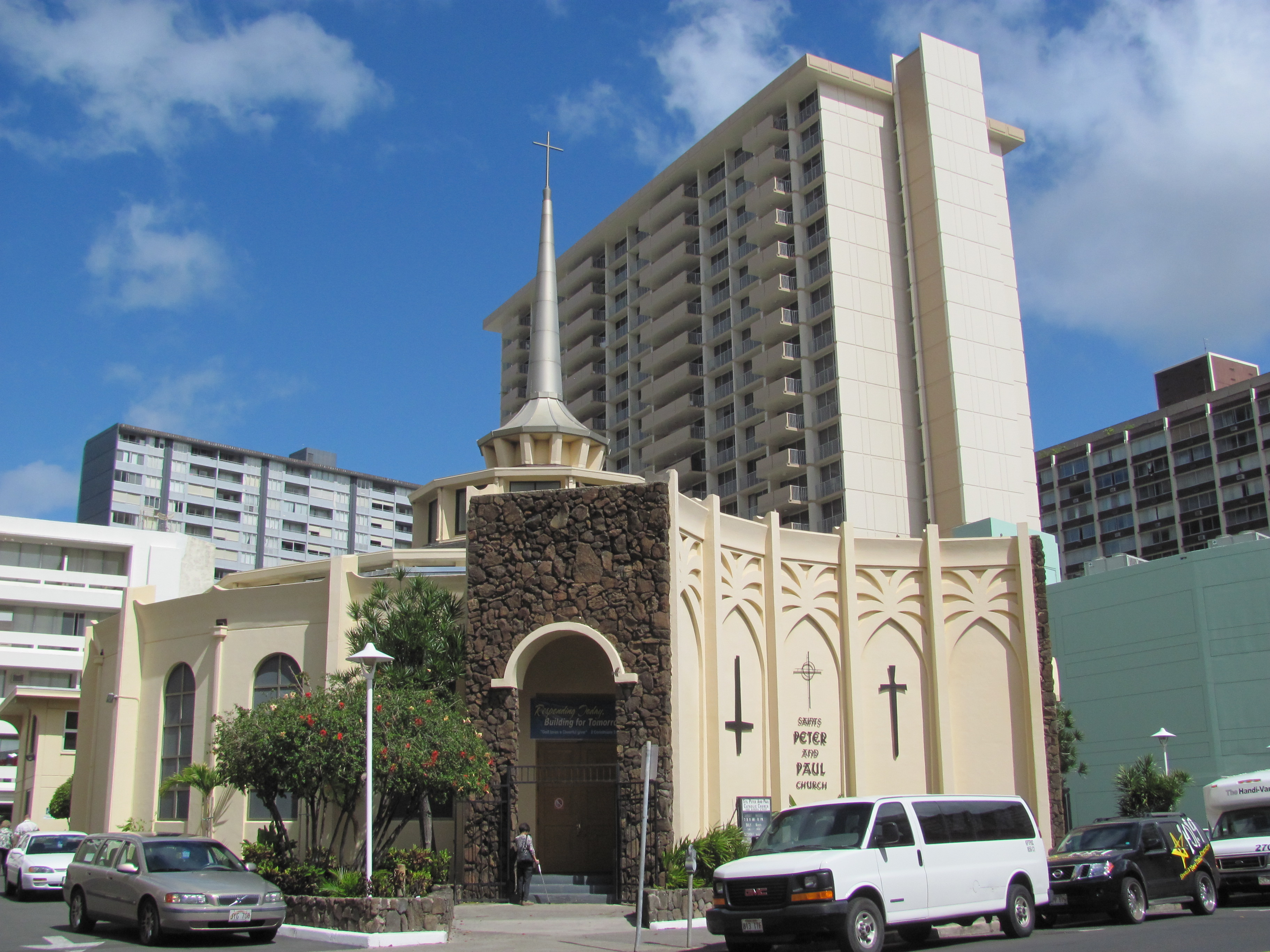
Saints Peter and Paul Catholic Church

Saints Peter and Paul Catholic Church is a Roman Catholic church in Honolulu, Hawaii. The church belongs to the East Honolulu vicariate of the Roman Catholic Diocese of Honolulu, and serves the Ala Moana, Ala Wai, Kapiolani, Kewalo, and McCully districts of the city. The church held its first mass on October 3, 1969, and has expanded to several neighboring buildings over the years.

== History ==
The church was established by Bishop John Joseph Scanlan in 1968, with Francis A. Marzen as the first pastor. While the church was being built, Marzen led mass in nearby hotels. The church's construction was completed the following year and the church was dedicated on September 28, 1969. The first mass was offered in the church building on October 3, 1969. Initially, the parish priests slept in a small residence in the back of the church. In the 1980s, however, a condominium was purchased for them so that the church building could accommodate more activities. Marzen retired in 1986.

For many years, the church operated a weekly mass at the Hilton Hawaiian Village as an outreach service to visitors. It ended the service in 2008. In 2015 the church was gifted two relics, one of Saint Peter and one of Paul the Apostle. In 2019 the church replaced 24 windows in the sanctuary with stained glass. The church purchased a three-story office building in 2020, occupying the first floor as an expansion and renting out the top two floors.

== Description ==
The church is located in the Ala Moana neighborhood of Honolulu on Kaheka Street. It was designed by Raymond Akaja and prominently features a white marble altar, oak pews, and Stations of the Cross carved out of bronze.

The church is named after Saints Peter and Paul, who were important figures in the early Christian Church. The church holds relics of both Peter and Paul which were authenticated in 1905 and gifted to the church in 2015. It also holds relics from the graves of Marianne Cope and Father Damien.
