= List of presidents of Brigham Young University–Hawaii =

The following people have served as presidents of the Church College of Hawaii (1955–74) and Brigham Young University–Hawaii (after 1974). This list does not include presidents of Brigham Young University (Provo, Utah) or Brigham Young University–Idaho.

Name	Dates of Service	Name of School
Reuben D. Law	1954–59	Church College of Hawaii
Richard T. Wootton	1959–64	Church College of Hawaii
Owen J. Cook	1964–71	Church College of Hawaii
Stephen L. Brower	1971–74	Church College of Hawaii
Dan W. Andersen	1974–80	Brigham Young University–Hawaii
J. Elliot Cameron	1980–86	Brigham Young University–Hawaii
Alton L. Wade	1986–94	Brigham Young University–Hawaii
Eric B. Shumway	1994–2007	Brigham Young University–Hawaii
Steven C. Wheelwright	2007–15	Brigham Young University–Hawaii
John S. Tanner	2015–20	Brigham Young University–Hawaii
John S. K. Kauwe III	2020–present	Brigham Young University–Hawaii
