= Hayes-Wheelwright matrix =

Analysis of manufacturing processes

Illustration of the product-process matrix. The framework predicts that companies outside of the green area cannot be successful.

The Hayes-Wheelwright Matrix, also known as the product-process matrix, is a tool used to analyze the fit between a chosen product positioning and the appropriate manufacturing process. It was developed by, and named for, Robert H. Hayes and Steven C. Wheelwright, who published articles entitled "Link Manufacturing Process and Product Life Cycles" and "The Dynamics of Process-Product Life Cycles" in the Harvard Business Review in 1979.

The first dimension of the matrix, the product lifecycle, is a measure of the maturity of the product or market. It ranges from highly customized products with low volumes, to highly standardized products with high volume. The second dimension, the process lifecycle, is a measure of the maturity of the manufacturing process. It ranges from highly manual processes with high unit costs (job shop) to highly automated process with low unit costs (continuous flow).

Companies can occupy any position in the matrix. However, according to the framework, they can only be successful if their product lifecycle stage is consistent with their process lifecycle stage.

== Using the matrix ==
A company's place on the matrix depends on two dimensions – the process structure/process lifecycle and the product structure/product lifecycles. The process structure/process lifecycle is composed of the process choice (job shop, batch, assembly line, and continuous flow) and the process structure (jumbled flow, disconnected line flow, connected line flow and continuous flow). The product structure/product lifecycle refers to the four stages of the product lifecycle from low volume to high volume and the product structure from low standardization to high standardization.

Hayes-Wheelright Matrix
	Product structure	Low Volume Unique Product	Low Volume Multiple Products	High Volume Standardized Product	Very high volume Commodity product
Process structure	Project				
Jumbled flow		Job Shop			
Disconnected line flow			Batch		
Connected line flow				Assembly-line	
Continuous flow					Continuous

Each process choice on the diagonal of the matrix comprises different sets of characteristics in consideration of skill level and flexibility of workers and labour intensity. The upper-left modules (project, job shop, batch processes) tend to have higher skilled workers with a larger range of skills for better flexibility and are more labor-intensive compared. It is rare for the upper-left modules to work at full capacity and they use general-purpose equipment. They usually cater to local and/or niche markets. The lower-right manufacturing processes (mass production; assembly line and continuous processes) require only unskilled or semi-skilled workers to monitor and maintain the equipment as they are far more capital intensive processes. The production facilities are also interrelated and require specialized machinery unique to the specific product. They often cater to national markets and can be vertically integrated. The matrix highlights the difficult trade-off between efficiency and flexibility of the operations with the upper-left modules favoring flexibility with high-cost productions and the lower-right modules favoring efficiency with the ability to spread their large fixed costs over a wider base, reducing cost per unit. The product-process matrix affects three aspects of the business.

=== Distinctive competence ===
Distinctive competence is a characteristic or aspect of the company that gives it a comparative advantage over its competitors, usually categorized by cost/price, quality, flexibility and service/time. The matrix can be used as a framework to identify and analyze a company's distinctive competence to better inform decisions on processes and alternatives and marketing alternatives.

==== Flexibility ====
The wide range of skilled labor and use of general-purpose equipment allows upper-left processes to have distinctive competence in flexibility in their product/service provided, specifically in unique product designs. Lower-right processes do not have that aspect of flexibility since they rely on specialized machinery with unskilled or semi-skilled workers. However, they have better flexibility when it comes to quantity.

==== Quality ====
Upper-left processes excel in quality when it comes to unique designs based on the customers' specifications or if the product is considered artisan. While upper-left processes cater products to specific customers, lower-right processes can take advantage of consistently producing homogeneous products to eliminate flaws and improve designs over time for a more reliability to the end user.

==== Service/Time ====
Upper-left processes can claim distinctive competence through face-to-face interaction and personal attention while lower-right processes are more time-efficient.

==== Cost/price ====
Businesses that use the upper-left processes are likely able to charge higher prices because of their ability to cater to individual customers and to compensate for the skilled labor. Lower-right processes are more cost-efficient because their large volumes allow them to take advantage of economies of scale.

=== Management ===
Firms operating along the diagonal matrix are assumed to perform better than those too far from the diagonal because it impairs them from competing effectively. For example, a commodity produced by a job shop would be economically impractical. There are niche players that do not operate exactly on the diagonal but near it; for example, Rolls-Royce manufactures automobiles using job shop. Management must consider the disadvantages and implications of doing so. Management can also consider the strategic implications of their position on the matrix compared to their competitors. A firm's position on the matrix can change over time; it can predict the consequences of any future products or process changes.

The nature of a product can be identified using the matrix. Hayes and Wheelwright illustrate this using a specialized manufacturer of printed circuit boards that produced customized products in low-volumes using an interrelated assembly-line process, placing the business in the undesirable lower-left corner of the matrix. Knowing this, the company concluded its product lay in design capability rather than the circuit boards themselves, which placed them nearer along the diagonal.

=== Organization ===
Another diagnostic use of the matrix is to organize individual operating units according to the suitable process choice while maintaining the overall coordination of the manufacturing procedure. Most firms use more than one process for a product. For example, batch processing may be more suitable for individual components because of its nature or the volume needed is not sufficient for the line process, but the product itself is constructed on an assembly line. Firms may need separate facilities for the parts or products. Firms can also produce similar products using different process options. Fender Musical Instruments mass-produce electric guitars using the line process while also producing custom guitars using job shop (Fender Custom Shop).

== The four stages ==
The Hayes-Wheelwright matrix is a four-stage model; each stage is characterized by the management strategy implemented to exploit the manufacturing potential. In stage 1, the production process is flexible and high cost, and becomes increasingly standardize, mechanized, and automated, resulting in an inflexible and cost-efficient process. A company can move between stages. Chase and Hayes (1991) expanded on the model to include service firms. Cruz and Rodriguez (2008) also used the theoretical framework to assess the effectiveness of the operations strategy. Bhurchand et al. report that the model is "widely accepted" in the relevant academic literature.

Stage 1
The company's approach to manufacturing is reactive, dealing with day-to-day problems like machine breakdowns, quality and delivery difficulties. They cannot use the potential of manufacturing as they struggle with foundation issues. The management will emphasize increasing equipment and technological investments rather than improving infrastructure like planning and measurement systems and workforce policies.

Stage 2
Companies would have long-term goals to achieve industry standards. The focus will be on productivity enhancement and economies of scale meeting standard practice. Companies would favor capital investments as the means for gaining competitive advantages. Their main aim is competitive parity in the manufacturing process.

Stage 3
The business strategy would generate the manufacturing strategy. Charter and mission statements are used to improve the company's competitive position by guiding manufacturing activities and decisions. Advancing manufacturing technologies like computer-aided design (CAD), computer-aided manufacturing (CAM) and flexible manufacturing system (FMS), as well as practices like just-in-time and lean manufacturing will be taken into consideration to enhance the product.

Stage 4
Firms will strategize to use manufacturing to boost their corporate competence. Their internal process and product improvements will advance past industry standards, eventually leading the sector. This will result in a sustainable competitive advantage. The manufacturing strategy will significantly motivate the competitive strategy and will influence major decisions of the company.

== Process choices ==
=== Job shop ===
Job shops are semi-custom manufacturing processes with small-to-medium volume. Products are either unique to the order or have inconsistent demand with long gaps between orders. Because each output is different, efficiency is difficult. Each order requires varying structure, materials, form and possibly processing in accordance with the customer's design and specification, resulting in a jumbled flow with no repetitive pattern. This usually requires a process layout in which the machines are grouped in different areas of the shop according to purpose or function. This manufacturing process also requires highly skilled and experienced labor. Besides manufacturing operations like tools, machine and die manufacturers, it can also apply to service operations such as law offices, medical practices, automobile repair and tailor shops.

=== Batch ===
Batch processes produce similar items on a repeated basis, often in higher volumes than job shops. Management might accumulate products so they can be processed together. The larger volume and repetition of requirements allows management to take a more effective manufacturing route as they optimize capacity and significantly reduce costs. There is a disconnected line flow or intermittent flow since the work-in-process move about different machine grouping in the shop in a jumbled fashion. It is smoother than job shop processing because the volume is higher and similarity in items allows the manufacturer to take advantage of the repetition. Printing and machine shops that have contracts for higher volumes of products are examples of the batch process in manufacturing. Examples of service operations could include some offices, some operations in hospitals, university and school classes and food preparations.

=== Line ===
Where the product has a consistent demand and large enough, the business can employ process referred to as mass-production such as the assembly line and continuous manufacturing. In the assembly line process, operations do not change with a standard and uninterrupted flow with a homogeneous output. This process is heavily automated with special-purpose equipment. Unlike the previous process, there is no variation in production. Managers would have a larger span of control and less skilled workers are needed because the standardization of the product means individual units do not have to me as closely monitored and controlled, easing routing, scheduling and control. The assembly line process also means machinery is organized according to sequence and is usually connected by an automated conveyor system, thus as a connected line flow. This is called a product layout. The set of inputs and outputs are often fixed and consistent with a continuous flow of work. An example of assembly-line manufacturing is automobile manufacturing. Car washes, class registration in universities and many fast food operations are services that employ assembly lines.

=== Continuous ===
Continuous production involves raw materials undergoing successive operations such as refining and processing to a narrow range of extremely standardized products characterize as commodities in very high volumes. Continuous manufacturing requires substantial capital investment, so demand for the product must be exceptionally high. The cost of starting or stopping the process can be detrimental to the business. Thus, the processes often run non-stop with minimum downtime. High production levels also minimize the average fixed cost per unit. The process is self-monitoring with a fixed and automated route, which limits labor requirements to monitoring and maintaining the machinery. Industries that use this process include gas, chemicals, electricity ores, rubber, petroleum, cement, paper, wood, and certain foods like milk, water, wheat, flour, sugar and spirits.

=== Project ===
A project is a process choice added by some writers and placed at the extreme upper-left corner of the matrix (i.e. where "Movie production" sits in the matrix above). Projects are large-scale unique products. They are unique to the customer and are often too big to move, thus the project is the process of choice.

== Advantages ==
The matrix facilitates broader thinking about organizational competence and competitive advantage by including stages of the product lifecycle and its choice of the production process(es) for different products into its strategic planning process. It allows manufacturing managers to be more involved in the planning process so that their decisions can more effectively coincide with those of marketing and of the corporation itself. All resulting in more informed predictions about the changes in the industry with appropriate strategic responses.

In addition, the matrix can be used to identify business opportunities available given the company's manufacturing capabilities. It can aid in major decision-making about changes in the production process and guide investment decisions to stay in line with product and process plans. It helps to choose the best process and product structure when entering a new market and the suitable manufacturing facilities. It also helps identify and monitor the progress of important manufacturing objectives at a corporate level.

== Disadvantages ==
The matrix does not account for the combinations of the product lifecycle and process lifecycle that do not follow the above-mentioned characteristics. "Some 60 per cent of the firms studied did not fall on the diagonal". Evolving management styles and technology are diminishing some of the inherent trade-offs found on the matrix, resulting in low predictive validity. Ahmad and Schroeder, however, suggest developing the matrix to include three axes rather than two. Besides the x-axis (product lifecycle stages) and the y-axis (Process lifecycle stages), they propose to add a z-axis to represent the company's adoption of innovative initiatives.

The product variety considered in the matrix is also limited. Koth and Orne (1989) propose the complexity of products and organizational characteristics like the extent of vertical integration, size and geographical scope of the operations should affect the appropriate process design. Das and Narasimhan (2001) suggest advanced manufacturing technology for modular product structures can influence the contingency effect of the product variety and increase output and improve capabilities for job and batch shops in areas that were conventionally related with assembly lines and flow lines.

The matrix is static and its dimensions are too simple. The matrix is based on a company's current products but does not account for the dynamic nature of their operating environments. Processes should be designed with the evolution of product offerings and projected future product offerings in mind.
