= Viliami Tolutaʻu =

American sculptor

Asipeli Havea "Viliami" Tolutaʻu (born 1951) is a Tongan sculptor and an emeritus professor of sculpture at Brigham Young University–Hawaii (BYU–Hawaii).

Tolutaʻu attended high school at Liahona High School in Tonga and went to study at BYU–Hawaii. He then went on to earn an M.F.A. from Brigham Young University in Provo, Utah, in 1983. He has been on BYU–Hawaii's art faculty since 1991.

Among works by Tolutaʻu is the statue of George Q. Cannon and Jonathan Napela at BYU–Hawaii that was unveiled as part of the 1997 Mormon pioneer sesquicentennial celebration. He also did a statue depicting Finau Ulukalala Feletoa II's 1807 encounter with writing for Liahona High School. He also did the sculpture Mamalahoe that is at the Windward Oahu Courthouse. He has also done sculptures for several elementary schools in Hawaii. Other sculptures include a statue of ʻAhoʻeitu, the first king of the Tuʻi Tonga dynasty, and one of Kamehameha IV and his family in Honolulu's International Market Place.

Tolutaʻu also did the sketch art for Tuku Fonua - The Land Given to God, a BYU–Hawaii produced film that was done on commission from the government of Tonga.

In 2007, Tolutaʻu co-chaired along with Tēvita O. Kaʻili the centennial celebration of The Church of Jesus Christ of Latter-day Saints (LDS Church) in Tonga. This was sponsored by the Uho o Tonga Historical Society, the Mormon Pacific Historical Society and the Mormon Historic Sites Foundation.

Tolutaʻu is a Latter-day Saint. He has been a bishop in the LDS Church.
