= The Church of Jesus Christ of Latter-day Saints in the Samoan Islands =

The Church of Jesus Christ of Latter-day Saints in Samoa
- Area: Pacific
- Members: 90,706 (2025)
- Stakes: 20
- Wards: 162
- Branches: 8
- Total Congregations: 170
- Missions: 1
- Temples: 1 operating; 1 announced; 2 total
- FamilySearch Centers: 20

The Church of Jesus Christ of Latter-day Saints in American Samoa
- Area: Pacific
- Members: 17,646 (2025)
- Stakes: 5
- Wards: 38
- Branches: 6
- Total Congregations: 44
- Temples: 1 under construction
- FamilySearch Centers: 6

The Church of Jesus Christ of Latter-day Saints in the Samoan Islands refers to the Church of Jesus Christ of Latter-day Saints and its members on the Samoan Islands. In 1890, there were 30 members in the Samoan islands. As of 2025, there were 108,352 members in 214 congregations. The Samoan Islands has the second most LDS Church members per capita in the world, behind Tonga.

As of 2025, the LDS Church reported 90,706 members in 165 congregations in the country of Samoa, making it the largest body of LDS Church members in Oceania outside of Australia and New Zealand.

== History ==
Combined Membership in the Samoan Islands
Year	Membership
1890	30
1899	1,139
1920	3,500
1930	4,543
1940	5,159
1950	7,319
1960	10,345
1970	24,249
1980	26,104
1989*	48,700
1999	71,310
2009	81,860
2019	100,230
2025	108,352
*1989 membership was published as a rounded number for both Samoa and American Samoa

In 2019, church president Russell M. Nelson met with head of state Tuimalealiifano Vaaletoa Sualauvi II of Samoa.

== Schools ==
In addition to seminaries and institutes, there are a few primary schools and secondary schools operated by the Church of Jesus Christ of Latter-day Saints.

- Church College Pesega
- Sauniatu Primary School
- Church College Vaiola

== Stakes ==
American Samoa

Stake	Organized	Mission
Pago Pago Samoa Stake	15 Jun 1969	Samoa Apia East
Pago Pago Samoa Central Stake	6 Feb 1994	Samoa Apia East
Pago Pago Samoa Malaeimi Stake	26 Aug 2012	Samoa Apia East
Pago Pago Samoa Mapusaga Stake	9 Mar 1997	Samoa Apia East
Pago Pago Samoa West Stake	24 Aug 1980	Samoa Apia East

Samoa

Stake	Organized	Mission
Apia Samoa Central Stake	8 Dec 2013	Samoa Apia East
Apia Samoa Stake	18 Mar 1962	Samoa Apia East
Apia Samoa West Stake	26 Apr 1970	Samoa Apia West
Pesega Samoa Stake	22 Jan 1995	Samoa Apia East
Savaii Samoa Fagamalo Stake	4 Dec 1995	Samoa Apia West
Savaii Samoa Pu'apu'a Stake	18 Mar 2012	Samoa Apia West
Savaii Samoa Sagone Stake	10 Sep 1995	Samoa Apia West
Savaii Samoa South Stake	17 Oct 1982	Samoa Apia West
Savaii Samoa Stake	8 Jan 1971	Samoa Apia West
Savaii Samoa West Stake	3 Jun 1973	Samoa Apia West
Upolu Samoa Aleisa Stake	5 Aug 1979	Samoa Apia West
Upolu Samoa East Stake	23 Oct 1977	Samoa Apia East
Upolu Samoa Faleasi'u Stake	24 Feb 1996	Samoa Apia West
Upolu Samoa Malie Stake	5 Aug 2012	Samoa Apia West
Upolu Samoa North Stake	25 Oct 1992	Samoa Apia East
Upolu Samoa Nu'umau Stake	3 Dec 1995	Samoa Apia East
Upolu Samoa Saleilua Stake	5 Dec 1995	Samoa Apia East
Upolu Samoa South Stake	1 Jun 1974	Samoa Apia West
Upolu Samoa Tafuaupolu Stake	26 Jan 2014	Samoa Apia West
Upolu Samoa West Stake	29 Apr 1971	Samoa Apia West

== Missions ==
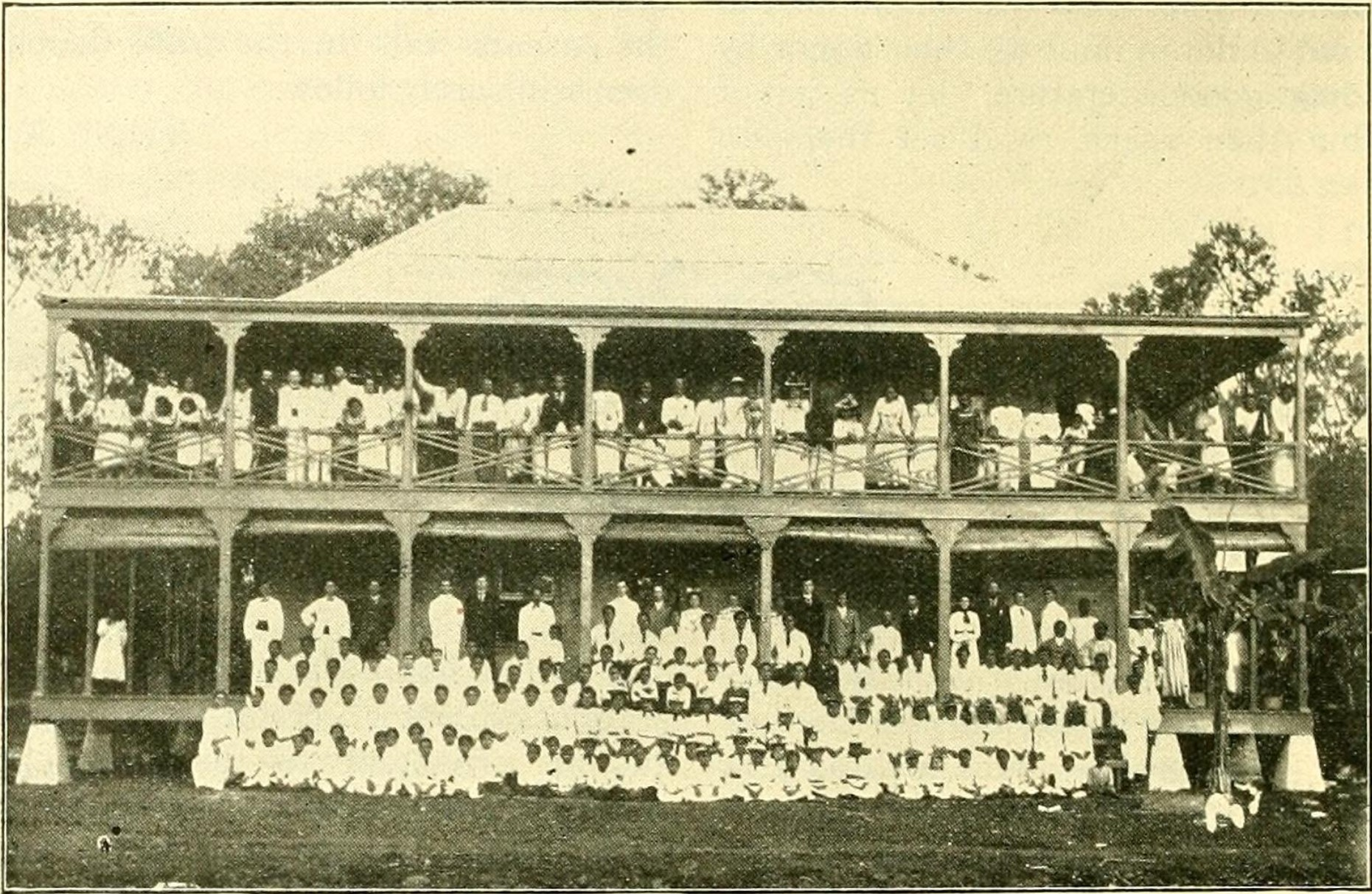
Samoa Mission Office ca 1902

The Samoa Apia Mission was formed June 17, 1888 and serves as the only mission for the Samoan Islands.

Mission	Organized
Apia Samoa East Mission	17 June 1888
Apia Samoa West Mission	1 July 2026

== Temples ==
Temples in the Samoan Islands
- = Operating
- = Under construction
- = Announced
- = Temporarily Closed

On August 5, 1983 the Apia Samoa Temple was dedicated by Gordon B. Hinckley. The Pago Pago American Samoa Temple was announced by Russell M. Nelson on April 7, 2019.

. Apia Samoa Temple (original) (Destroyed); Official website; News & images	
Location: Announced: Groundbreaking: Dedicated: Size: Style: Notes:	Apia, Samoa; July 2, 1980; February 19, 1981 by Spencer W. Kimball; August 5, 1983 by Gordon B. Hinckley; 14,560 sq ft (1,353 m^{2}) on a 2-acre (0.81 ha) site Classic Modern, single spire - designed by Emil B. Fetzer; Destroyed by fire during renovations on July 9, 2003. Rebuilt temple was dedicated September 4, 2005 (see 22).
22. Apia Samoa Temple; Official website; News & images	
Location: Announced: Groundbreaking: Dedicated: Rededicated: Size: Notes:	Apia, Samoa; 15 October 1977 by Spencer W. Kimball; 19 October 1981 by Dennis E. Simmons; 5 August 1983 by Gordon B. Hinckley; 4 September 2005 by Gordon B. Hinckley; 18,691 sq ft (1,736.5 m^{2}) on a 2-acre (0.81 ha) site - designed by Naylor, Wentworth, Lund; The original Samoa temple was dedicated in 1983 and destroyed by fire while the temple was closed for renovations in 2003. This new temple of a similar design was built on the same site although it is substantially larger. The LDS Church continues to list this as the 22nd operating temple, in accordance to its original dedication date.
235. Pago Pago American Samoa Temple (Under construction); Official website; News & images	
Location: Announced: Groundbreaking: Size: Notes:	Tafuna, American Samoa; 7 April 2019 by Russell M. Nelson; 30 October 2021 by K. Brett Nattress; 17,000 sq ft (1,600 m^{2}) on a 1.71-acre (0.69 ha) site In conjunction with the site announcement, the exterior rendering for this temple was simultaneously released, on the same day the site of the Neiafu Tonga Temple was confirmed and its rendering was released. The groundbreaking for this temple was originally set to occur on Saturday October 9, but a subsequent update on the arrangements provided the information about the presiding leader and the adjusted date.
324. Savai'i Samoa Temple (Site announced); Official website; News & images	
Location: Announced: Size:	Salelologa, Samoa; 1 October 2023 by Russell M. Nelson; 29,630 sq ft (2,753 m^{2}) on a 4.6-acre (1.9 ha) site

== See also ==
- Church Educational System
- Religion in Samoa
- Religion in American Samoa
