= Reuben D. Law =

American academic administrator

1st President of BYU-Hawaii
- In office 1954–1959
- Preceded by: Inaugural president
- Succeeded by: Richard T. Wootton

Personal details
- Born: March 19, 1903 Avon, Utah
- Died: April 19, 1981 (aged 78) Provo, Utah
- Spouse(s): Leda Ethelyn Call (1925–1973); Lue Groesbeck (1973–1978)
- Children: 5
- Education: Brigham Young College; Utah State Agricultural College; University of Southern California
- Profession: Professor of education Academic administrator

Reuben Deem Law (March 19, 1903 – April 19, 1981) was the first president of the Church College of Hawaii (CCH), which was later renamed Brigham Young University–Hawaii (BYU–Hawaii).

== Biography ==
Law was born in Avon, Utah, and raised on a ranch and farm. He married Leda Ethelyn Call in 1925 in Logan, Utah, and they had five children.

While in Logan, Law graduated from Brigham Young College and Utah State Agricultural College, receiving his bachelor's degree in history and education. He later attended the University of Southern California (USC) where he received a master's degree in education and educational administration, followed by an Ed.D. in teacher education in 1941.

Law's career began as an elementary school principal in Box Elder County, Utah. After teaching some high school, he became the first principal at the consolidated South Rich High School in Randolph, Utah. After one year, he became the county superintendent, here he served for six years in the 1930s. He then briefly served as superintendent in Duchesne County School District before joining the faculty at Brigham Young University (BYU) in 1936. Law was appointed dean of BYU's college of education from 1946 to 1954.

=== Church College of Hawaii ===
Three years after becoming president of the Church of Jesus Christ of Latter-day Saints (LDS Church), David O. McKay decided that the church would establish a college in Hawaii. Although Law had just finished building a new home in Provo, Utah, he accepted the invitation plan the new school and be its first president and "turn President McKay's vision into a reality." Eric B. Shumway, BYU–Hawaii's president fifty years later, said Law was "a man of strong character, [who] wielded a firm hand" and held an "absolute and fervent testimony of President McKay's calling as a prophet, seer, and revelator". Some contemporaries also saw him as a strict or authoritarian figure.

With no preexisting facilities, Law led the survey committee to investigate potential attendance and locations. Although Law recommended the school begin in Fall 1956 in Honolulu, the population center, McKay decided it should be on church-owned property in Laie, and open soon as possible, in September 1955. In the complex work of urgently organizing a new junior college "from scratch", Law was given "direct access to President McKay on nearly all matters concerning the college, including budget, thus bypassing much of the bureaucracy and red tape of the church". Law had some private conflicts with Frank Woolley and the LDS Church's Pacific Board of Education about acquiring resources and the scope of academic programs. The school began in temporary buildings with 20 faculty and 153 students, which rose to 250 students by the end of Law's term. Law resigned in 1959 to accept a position in Southern California, and he was replaced by prolific faculty member Richard Wootton.

=== Later activities ===
In the 1970s, Law served on the Utah State Board of Education, which he chaired in 1976 to 1977. He was also a temple worker in the Provo Temple in the 1970s.

In the LDS Church, Law served as a bishop, a counselor in a stake presidency, and a member of the church's Sunday School General Board.

Law's wife Leda died in 1973. Later that year he married Lue Groesbeck. In 1981, Law died at the age of 78 in Provo and was buried in Logan.

== Writings ==
- Law, Reuben D. (1928), History of Tremonton, [Seminar paper under Dr. Joel E. Ricks], Logan, Utah: Department of History, Utah State Agricultural College.
- Law, Reuben D. (April 1941), Content and Criteria Relating to Professional Teacher Education, [Doctoral thesis], University of Southern California.
- Law, Reuben D. (1952). The Utah School System: Its Organization and Administration. Provo, Utah: Brigham Young University Press.
- Law, Reuben D. (1953). "The Program of Teacher Preparation at Brigham Young University". In Jesse A. Bond & John A. Hockett (ed.). Curriculum Trends and Teacher Education. Lock Haven, Pennsylvania: The Association for Student Teaching, State Teacher's College. pp. 170–182.
- Law, Reuben D. (1972). The Founding and Early Development of the Church College of Hawaii. St. George, Utah: Dixie College Press.

== Sources ==
- Open Library listing for Law
- Shumway, Eric B., "Brigham Young University-Hawaii Campus" in Garr, et al., Encyclopedia of Latter-day Saint History. (Salt Lake City: Deseret Book, 2000) p. 138-139.
- Encyclopedia of Mormonism article on Brigham Young University
- Deseret News, April 24, 1971.
- Law, Reuben D.; Coombs, C. Garn (Aug 22, 1977), Reuben D. Law Oral History Interview (Reel audio tapes and transcript), Provo, Utah: Harold B. Lee Library, Brigham Young University.
