= Theo McFarland =

Samoa international rugby union & basketball player (born 1995)

- Full name: Theodore McFarland
- Born: 16 October 1995 (age 31) Apia, Samoa
- Height: 1.98 m (6 ft 6 in)
- Weight: 115 kg (254 lb; 18 st 2 lb)
- School: Pesega Church College

Rugby union career
- Position(s): Flanker, Lock
- Current team: Saracens
Amateur team(s)
Years	Team	Apps	(Points)
–	Moamoa Roosters	–	(–)
Senior career
Years	Team	Apps	(Points)
2018–19	Savai'i Vikings	–	(–)
2020	Manuma Samoa	1	(0)
2021–2026	Saracens	63	(65)
2026–	La Rochelle	0	(0)
- Correct as of 5 January 2025
International career
Years	Team	Apps	(Points)
2021–	Samoa	19	(10)
Correct as of 5 January 2025
Theo McFarland
No. 11 – Savai'i Vikings
- Position: Center
Personal information
- Born: 16 October 1995 (age 31) Apia, Samoa
- Listed height: 6 ft 6 in (1.98 m)
- Listed weight: 253 lb (115 kg)
Career information
- Playing career: 2018–2019
Medals
Men's basketball
Representing Samoa
Pacific Games
Bronze medal – third place	2019 Apia	3x3 basketball

Theodore McFarland (born 16 October 1995) is a Samoan professional rugby union player and former basketball player. He plays as a lock or flanker for English Premiership Rugby club Saracens and the Samoa national team.

== Basketball ==
Originally from the village of Moamoa in the suburbs of Apia, McFarland primarily played basketball as a child, only later taking up rugby once he entered high school. Between 2018 and 2019, he represented the Samoa national team.

McFarland's first major basketball tournament was the 2018 FIBA Oceania Polynesian Tournament, where Samoa advanced to the final, before losing out to Tahiti. The following year, he was selected for 2019 Pacific Games, when Samoa finished in sixth place. At the games, he also competed in the 3x3 tournament, helping Samoa to achieve a bronze medal.

== Rugby union ==
=== Samoa ===
McFarland started playing rugby while attending school at Pesega Church College. He played for the Moamoa Roosters Rugby Club in the local amateur championship, and also represented Moorabbin in the Dewar Shield rugby union competition in Australia from 2016 to 2018. Upon returning to Samoa, he played for the Savai'i Vikings, with whom he contested the Super 9 provincial championship in 2018 and 2019.

In 2019, McFarland was approached by ex-Samoan international rugby player Brian Lima, who was then the head coach of the Samoa Sevens team, to consider switching his focus from basketball to rugby union. McFarland trained with the Samoa 7s, and subsequently signed for Manuma Samoa in the new Global Rapid Rugby competition, which launched in 2020. In the opening round of the inaugural season, he started in the second row against the South China Tigers. However, this was the only match he played in 2020, since the season was immediately interrupted by the COVID-19 pandemic. That same year, he also signed a contract with Major League Rugby expansion team Dallas Jackals for the 2021 season, but he ultimately never joined them, after the franchise opted to delay its entry into the league due to the pandemic.

=== Saracens ===
In August 2021, McFarland agreed a one-year deal to join Saracens in the English Premiership, ahead of the 2021–22 season. He made his competitive debut for the club on 31 October, coming on as a substitute during a league victory against Harlequins. He gradually established himself as a first-team regular, featuring in 27 matches across all competitions that season, including 18 starts and 6 tries, with his playing time split between blindside flanker and lock. He also started in the team's Premiership final defeat to Leicester Tigers.

Ahead of the 2022–23 season, McFarland signed a new long-term contract with Saracens, keeping him at the club until 2026. His performances at the start of the season then saw him named as the Premiership Player of the Month for September 2022. He missed the second half of the season, after suffering an anterior cruciate ligament injury in December 2022. However, he had started all of the team's first 9 matches in Premiership and European competition, scoring 6 tries and helping the team to finish top of the league table, on their way to winning the title.

=== La Rochelle ===
On 3 July 2026, McFarland would leave Saracens to sign for French giants La Rochelle in the Top 14 from the 2026-27 season.

=== International career ===
McFarland received his first call up to the Samoa senior squad in May 2021, from new head coach Seilala Mapusua. He made his debut in July, playing in two uncapped international fixtures against the Māori All Blacks, before earning his first test cap against Tonga in the 2023 Rugby World Cup qualifiers. He then played in all three matches in Samoa's title-winning run at the 2022 Pacific Nations Cup.

Although he missed several months of 2023 while recovering from ACL surgery, McFarland returned to the international stage in the final round of the 2023 Pacific Nations Cup. He was subsequently named in Samoa's 32-player squad for the 2023 Rugby World Cup. McFarland played every minute of his country's four games at the tournament, including a Player of the Match performance against Chile.

In 2024, McFarland was appointed as the new Samoa captain, succeeding Michael Alaalatoa. For his inaugural match as skipper, he led his team to victory over Italy – Samoa's first win against a tier 1 nation for nine years.
