= Pago Pago American Samoa Temple =

- Dedication scheduled
- Interactive map of Pago Pago American Samoa Temple
- Number: 232
- Dedication: 13 December 2026, by Quentin L. Cook
- Site: 1.71 acres (0.69 ha)
- Floor area: 17,000 ft^{2} (1,600 m^{2})
- Official website • News & images

Additional information
- Announced: 7 April 2019, by Russell M. Nelson
- Groundbreaking: 30 October 2021, by K. Brett Nattress
- Open house: 4-21 November 2026
- Current president: Kalilimoku Sola August Hunt
- Location: Tafuna, American Samoa
- Coordinates: 14°20′02″S 170°43′56″W
- Baptistries: 1
- Ordinance rooms: 2
- Sealing rooms: 2
- Notes: In conjunction with the site announcement, the exterior rendering for this temple was simultaneously released, on the same day the site of the Neiafu Tonga Temple was confirmed and its rendering was released. The groundbreaking for this temple was originally set to occur on Saturday October 9, but a subsequent update on the arrangements provided the information about the presiding leader and the adjusted date.

The Pago Pago American Samoa Temple is a temple of the Church of Jesus Christ of Latter-day Saints awaiting dedication in Tafuna, American Samoa. A temple in Pago Pago was originally announced in 1977, but the proposed location was subsequently changed to Apia, Samoa, when Spencer W. Kimball was serving as church president. The intent to construct a temple in Pago Pago was announced on April 7, 2019, by church president Russell M. Nelson during general conference. It is the first Latter-day Saint temple in American Samoa.

The temple is a single-story building of approximately 17,000 square feet (1,579 m²). Its exterior has a blue slatted roof, three arched entryways, and a three-tiered tower with a golden spire. The temple is located along Ottoville Road in Tafuna, sharing a site with the existing meetinghouse of the church's Pago Pago Samoa Central Stake.

== History ==
A temple in Pago Pago was originally announced in 1977 by church president Spencer W. Kimball. In 1980, Kimball announced that the proposed temple location would be changed to Apia, where the Apia Samoa Temple was then constructed, being dedicated in 1983. As a result, church members in American Samoa traveled to Apia to participate in temple ordinances.

On April 7, 2019, along with seven others announced during general conference, church president Russell M. Nelson stated a temple would be built in Pago Pago. The temple's location and exterior rendering were released in August 2020, on the same site as an existing meetinghouse on Ottoville Road in Tafuna.

The groundbreaking ceremony was originally scheduled for October 9, 2021, but was postponed in September of that year. The ceremony was held on October 30, 2021, with K. Brett Nattress, a general authority and first counselor in the church's Pacific Area, presiding. This marked the beginning of construction of the church's first temple in American Samoa, nearly 45 years after the original announcement. The ceremony was attended by church members, community representatives, and government officials, including Governor Lemanu Mauga and his wife, Ella Mauga; Senate President Tuaolo Manaia Fruean; Speaker of the House Savali Talavou Ale; and Bishop Peter Brown of the Diocese of Samoa Pago Pago. The ceremony was broadcast to meetinghouses throughout American Samoa, and a recording was made available in both Samoan and English.

By August 2026, the temple was described as nearly complete, with a media day held on November 2, 2026, followed by tours for invited guests on November 3, and a public open house from November 4 through 21, excluding Sundays. The temple is scheduled to be dedicated on December 13, 2026, by Quentin L. Cook of the Quorum of the Twelve Apostles, in a single broadcast to congregations in the temple district.

The church's temples are directed by a temple president and matron, each typically serving for a term of three years. The president and matron oversee the administration of temple operations and provide guidance and training for both temple patrons and staff. Kalilimoku A. Hunt and Tuputausi Hunt will serve as the first temple president and matron, respectively.

== Design and architecture ==
The Pago Pago American Samoa Temple is a single-story building of approximately 17,000 square feet (1,579 m²). Its exterior design includes a blue slatted roof, three arched entryways, and a three-tiered tower topped by a golden spire. The surrounding grounds feature grassy landscaping with palm trees, flowers, and small bushes.

The temple is located along Ottoville Road in Tafuna, in the Western District of American Samoa. The temple complex includes housing for the temple president and matron, missionary housing, and a distribution center.

The temple has two instruction rooms, two sealing rooms, and a baptistry.

== Preparations ==
In preparation for the temple's completion, church members in American Samoa began an effort to identify deceased ancestors for temple ordinances, establishing a goal in 2023 to prepare one million names by the time the temple was completed. By April 2025, approximately 700,000 names had been prepared. That month, a five-day family history open house called So’otaga was held at the Department of Youth and Women's Affairs arena in Tafuna, attracting nearly 2,000 participants. The event included an exhibit where visitors added paper leaves bearing their names to a life-size tree silhouette.

A public open house is being held from November 4 through November 21, 2026, excluding Sundays. A media day on November 2 was followed by tours for invited guests on November 3. Like all the church's temples, it is not used for Sunday worship services. To members of the church, temples are regarded as sacred houses of the Lord. Once dedicated, only church members with a current temple recommend can enter for worship.

== See also ==
- Comparison of temples (LDS Church)
- List of temples (LDS Church)
- List of temples by geographic region (LDS Church)
- Temple architecture (LDS Church)
- The Church of Jesus Christ of Latter-day Saints in the Samoan Islands
