= Kaleohano (Mormon) =

- Born: 1831; Pulehu, Kula region of Maui, Hawaiian Kingdom
- Died: March 1896 (aged 64–65)
- Occupations: missionary and Mormon leader
- Known for: multiple missions throughout Hawaii
- Spouse: Kaahanui (m. 1851)
- Children: 6

Kaleohano (1831 – March 1896) was a Hawaiian ali'i, missionary, and leader in the Church of Jesus Christ of Latter-day Saints (LDS Church). He was born in 1831 to a noble family and was one of the first converts of missionary George Q. Cannon. After his baptism, Kaleohano served multiple missions throughout Hawaii and became a prominent community leader in Lā'ie. With his wife Kaahanui, he was the father of six children.

== Birth and education ==
Kaleohano was born in 1831 in Pulehu in the Kula region of Maui. His family were ali’i, or part of the traditional Hawaiian nobility. Though his parents moved to Maui around 1819, his grandfather had been a chief at Ka’ū on Hawaii, and his family was distantly related to King Kamehameha I. When Kaleohano was a child, Protestant missionaries visited his island, and his parents converted to Christianity. In his early years, he was instructed in the traditional arts of mele and hula. After his parents' conversion to Christianity, he was also sent to the local missionary school. A promising student, Kaleohano, went on to attend a school in Lahainaluna, where he received a Western education.

== Baptism and church service ==
When Kaleohano returned from school at the age of twenty, he married Kaahanui and established a home with her at Keālia. Soon after their marriage, the couple was introduced to George Q. Cannon, a missionary from the LDS Church, by Kaleohano’s cousin and schoolmate, Jonathan Napela. Kaleohano and Kaahanui were baptized in late June or early July 1851, along with two others, Pake and Maiola, making them the first group of converts baptized by Cannon.

After his baptism, Kaleohano accompanied Cannon to the other side of Maui, beginning a lifetime of missionary service. His education in the Hawaiian oral tradition made him a powerful speaker, and his noble lineage allowed him to facilitate connections for the missionaries wherever they traveled. His time preaching on Maui was followed shortly after by a mission to the Big Island. In addition to his missionary service, Kaleohano also served as the clerk of the Kealohou branch, directed the choir at the dedication of the Kula chapel, and led the branch at Kealia, all within his first two years of church membership. By the time the missionaries from Utah left Hawaii in 1854, Kaleohano had gone on seven missionary assignments throughout the Islands.

Despite his busy life of church service, Kaleohano and Kaahanui were still able to start a family. On April 22, 1853, Kaahanui gave birth to the couple’s first child, Lucy. Kaleohano was so proud of his newborn daughter that he led the procession to church with Lucy in his arms, feeling "as important as the King on his throne," according to Elder Ephraim Green. The family had six children in total, two daughters and four sons.

After the first group of Utah missionaries left Hawaii, Kaleohano continued his involvement in church leadership. He spoke in favor of a plan for the Hawaiian Latter-day Saints to gather to Lanai and oversaw various aspects of the move. In addition, he also advocated for the mission to create a school where Latter-day Saints could learn English. It is likely that the future president of the church, fifteen-year-old Joseph F. Smith stayed with the Kaleohano family upon his arrival in Hawaii.

When the Hawai’i church fell under the leadership of Walter M. Gibson in 1861, Kaleohano distanced himself, remaining at Kula until leaders from church headquarters arrived in 1864 and excommunicated Gibson for the preaching of false doctrine, maladministration, and embezzlement. At a mission conference in 1864, Kaleohano was one of the speakers, and, reportedly, rejoiced at the arrival of legitimate church leaders.

== Time in Lā'ie ==
In 1865, the Kaleohano family moved to Lā'ie with many other church members to establish an agricultural colony. The family built a frame house in an area which became known as Kaleohano's Gulch where Kaleohano raised livestock, planted taro, and fished. Kaleohano also leased and sold land on Maui to support his family. Occasionally, Kalehano worked as a sugar boiler at the mill in Lā'ie. Kaleohano and Kaahanui also hosted newly arrived American missionaries in order for the missionaries to learn Hawaiian, a service Kaleohano performed continually beginning in 1851. Joseph F. Smith, who later became president of the Church, was one of the early missionaries to live in Kaleohano's home, forging a friendship that lasted a lifetime. Kaleohano was also well-known for organizing and directing choirs and exhibitions of "Hawaiian amusement" including mele and hula for a number of church conferences and community activities.

While in Lā'ie, Kaleohano continued to go on short missions around the islands, often as a companion to Utah Elders in Hawaii. On one occasion, Kaleohano was responsible for baptizing over a hundred people. He also recruited new settlers for Lā’ie, bringing fifty-three from Hawai’i in April 1872. Between 1877 and 1879, Kalehano accompanied Elder Henry P. Richards on various missionary visits where Elder Richards reported little sleep because Kaleohano was a "champion snorer." In 1888, Kaleohano completed missionary visits to Molokai and Lanai. His last call was as a "home missionary" in 1893.

== Monarchy Contact ==
During his time in Lā'ie, Kaleohano became the Monarchy’s go-to contact within the church. In August 1871, Kaleohano and Jonatana Napela were once asked to give a priesthood blessing to King Kamehameha V. Later, in April 1874, when King Kalākaua and Queen Kapi’olani visited Lā'ie on their first round the island tour, Kaleohano received the official notification of the upcoming visit. Several visits followed, and the king and queen and other members of the royal family regularly stayed with Kaleohano and Kaahanui or with their daughter Lucy. In 1877, Kaleohano was a member of a special delegation which presented the Queen Kapi'olani with a gift of the Book of Mormon. In 1879, Kaleohano accompanied Elder Richards on a visit to the king to discuss a troublesome tax issue. Kaleohano dedicated the northwest cornerstone of the Lā'ie chapel on April 6, 1882, with the king in attendance. In the fall of 1883, the king participated in the chapel's dedication, and Kaleohano gave the welcoming remarks upon his arrival.

Kaleohano died in March 1896.

== Descendants ==
In July 2020, Kaleohano's fourth-great-grandson John S.K. "Keoni" Kauwe became the eleventh President of BYU–Hawaii.
