= John Sears Tanner =

American educational and religious leader

John S. Tanner

10th President of BYU–Hawaii
- In office July 27, 2015 – June 30, 2020
- Preceded by: Steven C. Wheelwright
- Succeeded by: John S. K. Kauwe III

Personal details
- Born: July 27, 1950 (age 76) Salt Lake City, Utah
- Spouse: Susan W. Tanner (m. 1974)
- Education: Brigham Young University; University of California at Berkeley

John Sears Tanner (born July 27, 1950) is an American educator who served as the tenth president of Brigham Young University-Hawaii (BYU–Hawaii) from 2015 to 2020. He previously served as first counselor in the General Sunday School Presidency of the Church of Jesus Christ of Latter-day Saints (LDS Church) (2014 to 2015), as president of the church's Brazil São Paulo South Mission (2011 to 2014) and as academic vice president of Brigham Young University (BYU). Tanner is married to Susan W. Tanner, a former general president of the LDS Church's Young Women organization.

== Biography ==
Tanner was born in Salt Lake City, Utah, and grew up in South Pasadena, California, one of 13 children born to William and Athelia Tanner. He served an LDS Church missionary in Brazil. In 1974, Tanner received a bachelor's degree from BYU. While at BYU he met Susan Winder. They married in the Salt Lake Temple in 1974. He then began studies at the University of California at Berkeley where he received a PhD in English in 1980.

Tanner began his academic career as an assistant professor at Florida State University. He has also been a Fulbright Scholar in Brazil. Tanner became a member of the BYU faculty in 1982. Tanner has focused much of his study on John Milton. His book, Anxiety in Eden (Oxford University Press), received the Best Book Award from the Milton Society of America in 1992. Tanner also contributed to the Encyclopedia of Mormonism.

Tanner is a former, two-term president of the Association for Mormon Letters.

From 1992 to 1998, Tanner was BYU's associate academic vice president for undergraduate and international education. He developed the freshman academy program to better transition new freshmen into BYU and helped write the current university policy on academic freedom. Tanner also oversaw changes to BYU's general education requirements, including a reduction in the physical education requirement. In 2001, Paul Y. Hoskisson edited a volume entitled Historicity and the Latter-day Saint Scriptures which included a chapter by Tanner entitled "The World and the Word: History, Literature and Scripture." It was a scholarly attempt to deal with, among other things, issues surrounding archaeology study of ancient American societies portrayed in the Book of Mormon.

From 1998 to 2003, Tanner served as chair of the BYU English Department. He was BYU's academic vice president from 2004 to 2011.

Tanner wrote BYU's educational aims (spiritually strengthening, intellectually enlarging, character building, lifelong learning and service).

Tanner has served in the LDS Church as a bishop and stake president. In 2011, Tanner was assigned to serve as president of the Brazil São Paulo South Mission.

At the church's April 2014 General Conference, Tanner was accepted by the membership as first counselor to Tad R. Callister in the general presidency of the church's Sunday School. Tanner completed his service in Brazil and officially began the Sunday School assignment in July 2014.

On May 12, 2015, Russell M. Nelson, chairman of the executive committee of the BYU–Hawaii Board of Trustees, announced that effective July 27, 2015, Tanner would succeed Steven C. Wheelwright as the president of BYU-Hawaii.

In June 2015, the LDS Church announced that Devin Durrant, who had been serving as the second counselor in the Sunday School General Presidency, would succeed Tanner as first counselor.

On May 12, 2020, Jeffrey R. Holland, chairman of the executive committee of the BYU–Hawaii Board of Trustees, announced that Tanner would be succeeded as the institution's president by John S. K. Kauwe III, effective July 1, 2020.

== Music and poetry ==
Tanner wrote the words to "Bless Our Fast We Pray," which is hymn #138 in the 1985 English-language edition of the LDS Church hymnal. Tanner also wrote a "Sacrament Sonnet" that was published in Ensign in 1981.

Tanner was also involved with putting to music "Nephi's Psalm," from a chapter in the Book of Mormon. The first adaption, "I Love the Lord" was written to the tune of "Be Still My Soul" and has been sung at the priesthood session of both the October 1999 and April 2007 general conferences. His second, "Sometimes My Soul," is based on the American folk tune "Poor Wayfaring Stranger." Tanner also wrote an article in Ensign on the power of hymns.

Tanner is also a published poet.
