= Neiafu Tonga Temple =

LDS temple

- Under construction
- Interactive map of Neiafu Tonga Temple
- Number: 235
- Site: 4.81 acres (1.95 ha)
- Floor area: 17,000 ft^{2} (1,600 m^{2})
- Height: 75 ft (23 m)
- Official website • News & images

Additional information
- Announced: 7 April 2019, by Russell M. Nelson
- Groundbreaking: 11 September 2021, by ‘Inoke F. Kupu
- Current president: Tukia-’I-Vava’U Havea
- Location: Neiafu, Tonga
- Coordinates: 18°38′40″S 173°58′40″W
- Baptistries: 1
- Ordinance rooms: 2
- Sealing rooms: 2

The Neiafu Tonga Temple is a temple of the Church of Jesus Christ of Latter-day Saints under construction in Neiafu, in the Vavaʻu island of Tonga. It will be the church's second temple in the country, where more than 66,000 Latter-day Saints live, following the Nuku'alofa Tonga Temple, which was dedicated in 1983. The intent to construct the temple was announced on April 7, 2019, by church president Russell M. Nelson during general conference.

The temple is located on Tuʻi Road in Neiafu, adjacent to Saineha High School. It will be a single-story structure of approximately 17,000 square feet. An exterior rendering released in August 2020 shows a white temple and a central spire. As of 2025, construction is nearing completion, with open house and dedication dates yet to be announced.

== History ==
It was announced by church president Russell M. Nelson on April 7, 2019, that one of eight new temples was identified during general conference. The announcement was a significant development for Latter-day Saints living in the Vavaʻu island group, who previously traveled to Tongatapu to attend the Nukuʻalofa Tonga Temple. Its construction reflects continued membership growth in the South Pacific and Tonga's longstanding presence as one of the church's most established nations in the region.

On August 14, 2020, the church released a rendering and site information. Plans outlined a single-story temple of approximately 17,000 square feet, along with supporting facilities, including residences for the temple president and missionaries. The design uses architectural elements commonly used in temples in the Pacific region, including a white exterior and landscaped grounds. It will include two instruction rooms, two sealing rooms, and a baptistry, with a nearby ancillary building to house a distribution center, an arrival center, and a family history center.

Ground was broken for the temple on September 11, 2021. The ceremony was presided over by Inoke Kupu, a church area seventy, and was attended by King Tupou VI and Queen Nanasipauʻu, as well as other government and community leaders. The event was broadcast live on national radio throughout Tonga. Speakers emphasized the spiritual importance of the temple and its role in strengthening families and communities in the region. The groundbreaking coincided with the 129th anniversary of the baptism of the first Tongan convert on September 11, 1892. This was also just over 40 after the groundbreaking of Tonga's first temple in Nuku'alofa.

As of 2025, construction had progressed significantly, with reports indicating the structure was nearing completion and generating anticipation among residents and church members in Vavaʻu.

== Temple leadership and admittance ==
The church's temples are directed by a temple president and matron, each typically serving for a term of three years. The president and matron oversee the administration of temple operations and provide guidance and training for both temple patrons and staff. A president and matron have not yet been announced.

Like all the church's temples, it is not used for Sunday worship services. To members of the church, temples are regarded as sacred houses of the Lord. Once dedicated, only church members with a current temple recommend can enter for worship.

== See also ==
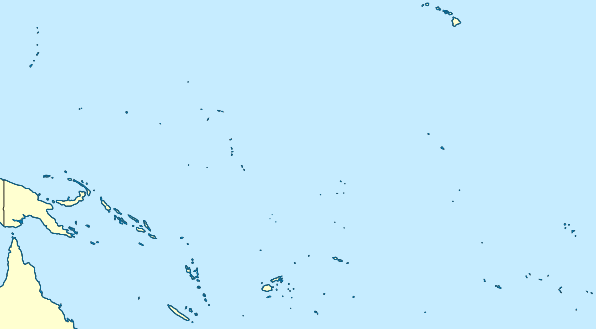
Temples in the Pacific Islands
- = Operating
- = Under construction
- = Announced
- = Temporarily Closed
- Comparison of temples (LDS Church)
- List of temples (LDS Church)
- List of temples by geographic region (LDS Church)
- Temple architecture (LDS Church)
- The Church of Jesus Christ of Latter-day Saints in Tonga
