= Nuku'alofa Tonga Temple =

LDS Temple in Nuku'alofa, Tonga

- The Nuku'alofa Tonga Temple
- Interactive map of Nuku'alofa Tonga Temple
- Number: 23
- Dedication: 9 August 1983, by Gordon B. Hinckley
- Site: 1.2 acres (0.49 ha)
- Floor area: 21,184 ft^{2} (1,968.1 m^{2})
- Official website • News & images

Church chronology
← Apia Samoa Temple	Nuku'alofa Tonga Temple	→ Santiago Chile Temple

Additional information
- Announced: 2 April 1980, by Spencer W. Kimball
- Groundbreaking: 18 February 1981, by Spencer W. Kimball
- Open house: 19–30 July 1983; 29 September–20 October 2007
- Rededicated: 4 November 2007, by Russell M. Nelson
- Current president: Sione Tatafu Angakehe Tafuna
- Designed by: Emil B. Fetzer
- Location: Nukuʻalofa, Tonga
- Coordinates: 21°9′45.21960″S 175°16′20.35200″W
- Exterior finish: "R-wall" exterior finish and insulation system on concrete block; roof covered by split cedar shake shingles.
- Baptistries: 1
- Ordinance rooms: 2 (stationary)
- Sealing rooms: 3
- Clothing rental: Yes
- Notes: The Tongan temple was rededicated 4 November 2007 following remodeling that began in June 2006.

The Nukuʻalofa Tonga Temple is a temple of the Church of Jesus Christ of Latter-day Saints in Nukuʻalofa, Tonga. It was announced on April 2, 1980, by church president Spencer W. Kimball during a news conference. It is the first in Tonga and the 23rd operating temple worldwide. A groundbreaking ceremony was held on February 18, 1981. The temple was dedicated on August 9, 1983, by Gordon B. Hinckley, a counselor in the First Presidency. It has a single spire with a statue of the angel Moroni on its top. After renovations in 2006 and 2007, the temple was rededicated on November 4, 2007, by Hinckley, who by then was serving as church president.

== History ==
The church was established in Tonga in 1891, when Brigham Smoot and Alva Butler arrived in Nukuʻalofa and received permission from King George Tupou I to preach. Over the following decades, Church schools were organized, local leadership developed, and membership steadily increased. The church's first meeting took place August, 1891, and the first meetinghouse was completed on January 24, 1892. The first Tongan convert, Alipate, was baptized in September 1892.

The church's missionaries were removed from Tonga multiple times, due to various events. In April 1897, with less than 15 baptisms in six years, the mission closed, and Tonga became a British protectorate on May 18, 1900. There was also the canceling of visas for foreign missionaries in 1922 (sending those who were non-natives home), and the sending home of missionaries surrounding the years of World War II, from 1940 to 1946. In 1946, the Book of Mormon was published in Tongan. The church's Liahona College was dedicated on September 9, 1953, and later became Liahona High School.

In January 1955, church president David O. McKay visited Tonga and expressed his vision for a temple to be built in the country. Three years later, in 1958, Tongan Saints participated in the first temple ordinances performed in their language following dedication of the New Zealand Temple. Continued growth led to the organization of the first stake in Nukuʻalofa in 1968, with Orson H. White as president, and the calling of Tonga Toutai Pāletu‘a as the first local mission president in 1974.

Kimball announced the intent to construct the temple on April 2, 1980, during a news conference, along with six other temples. A groundbreaking ceremony was held on February 18, 1981, led by Kimball and Adney Y. Komatsu, a church general authority.

Construction was completed in 1983, and the temple was dedicated on August 9 of that year by Gordon B. Hinckley, then a counselor in the First Presidency. It became the church's 23rd operating temple and the first in Tonga.

== Design and architecture ==
The first architectural drawings of the temple didn’t have a spire, or an angel Moroni statue. The temple was eventually constructed with an exterior R-Wall finish and insulation system, and has a single spire topped with a statue of the angel Moroni. The design style is modern, and includes three sealing rooms, two ordinance rooms, and a baptistry. The original floor area was 14,572 square feet, which was 142 feet by 115 feet. The renovated floor area is 21,184 square feet, with a building dimension of 200 by 115 feet. The temple was originally designed by church architect Emil B. Fetzer, with Naylor Whenton Lund Architects designing the renovations. The grounds include landscaped elements, such as flowers, shrubs, grass, and native trees that suit the climate and water-use concerns of Tonga.

The temple closed for renovations in June 2006 to update its architectural features and to include a temple style baptistry.

== Cultural and community impact ==
At the groundbreaking ceremony, the king Taufa‘ahau Tupou IV attended and turned a shovel, as part of the ceremony.

Following the 2007 renovation period, more than 40,000 visitors toured the temple during a public open house, about 40% of the island's total population. Guests included Princess Pulolevu and Ainise Sevele, wife of Tongan Prime Minister Feleti Sevele. Sevele stated that her visit to the temple “was a personal journey into the realm of all that is holy, which is peace, serenity, hope, happiness and joy”. A tongan native said that visiting the temple was one of the memorable moments of their life.

== Temple leadership and admittance ==
=== Leadership ===
The church's temples are directed by a temple president and matron, each typically serving for a term of three years. The president and matron oversee the administration of temple operations and provide guidance and training for both temple patrons and staff. Past leaders include Eric B. Shumway, who served along with this wife, Carolyn M. Shumway, from 2007 to 2010. As of 2022, Samiuela Falefo’ou Masima is the president, with Lupe Palei Masima serving as matron.

=== Admittance ===
Prior to its original dedication, the temple was open for public tours from July 18 to July 30, 1983. It was dedicated by Gordon B. Hinckley on August 9, 1983, in four sessions. Following renovations, a public open house was again held, drawing over 40,000 visitors before the rededication, which was also done by Hinckley.

Like all the church's temples, it is not used for Sunday worship services. To members of the church, temples are regarded as sacred houses of the Lord. Once dedicated, only church members with a current temple recommend can enter for worship.

== See also ==
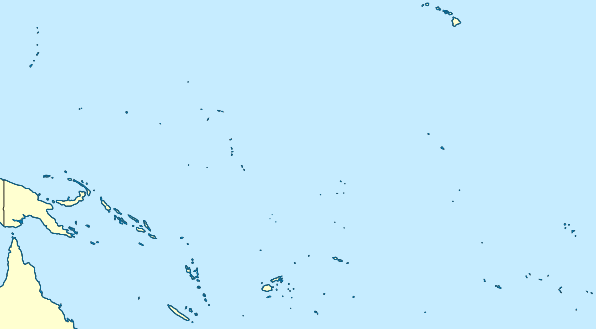
Temples in the Pacific Islands
- = Operating
- = Under construction
- = Announced
- = Temporarily Closed
- Eric B. Shumway, a former temple president
- Comparison of temples of The Church of Jesus Christ of Latter-day Saints
- List of temples of The Church of Jesus Christ of Latter-day Saints
- List of temples of The Church of Jesus Christ of Latter-day Saints by geographic region
- Temple architecture (Latter-day Saints)
- The Church of Jesus Christ of Latter-day Saints in Tonga
