= Alton L. Wade =

American educational administrator

- Born: March 1934; Leamington, Utah, US
- Died: September 5 2024; St George, Utah, US
- Education: Brigham Young University, California State University, Long Beach
- Occupation: Educational administrator
- Children: 8

Alton LaVar Wade (born March 1934) is a retired American educational administrator.

== Biography ==
Wade was born in Leamington, Utah. As a young man Wade served as a missionary in the Central States Mission of the Church of Jesus Christ of Latter-day Saints (LDS Church). He earned a bachelor's degree from Brigham Young University (BYU) and a master's degree from California State University, Long Beach. Wade pursued graduate work at UCLA as well. He also earned a doctorate in education from BYU.

Wade served as a teacher, vice-principal and principal of the Church College of New Zealand. He then served as an administrator for the LDS Church schools in the Pacific islands and then as a zone administrator for the Church Educational System.

Wade served as president of Dixie College from 1980 to 1986. During his tenure at Dixie College, the Dixie Center was developed and the college had its first ever NJCAA championship, specifically in basketball.

Wade then served as president of Brigham Young University–Hawaii from 1986 to 1994. During his tenure, BYU–Hawaii was organized into three colleges: the College of Arts and Sciences, the School of Business and the School of Education. Wade moved BYU–Hawaii away from vocational education to being more focused on truly collegiate level education. From 1994 to 2000 he was the Vice President of Student Life at BYU.

Wade has served in many callings in the LDS Church, including as a stake president. From 2000 to 2003 he served as president of the church's Washington DC South Mission.

Wade and his wife, the former Diana Daniels, are the parents of eight children.
