= Steven C. Wheelwright =

President of Brigham Young University - Hawaii

9th President of BYU–Hawaii
- In office June 23, 2007 – July 27, 2015
- Preceded by: Eric B. Shumway
- Succeeded by: John S. Tanner

Personal details
- Born: 1943 (age 82–83) Salt Lake City, Utah
- Spouse: Margaret Wheelwright
- Education: University of Utah; Stanford Business School

Steven Charles Wheelwright was the 9th president of Brigham Young University–Hawaii (BYU-Hawaii) from 2007 to 2015. Prior to that appointment, he was a professor and senior associate dean at Harvard Business School.

== Biography ==
Wheelwright has a bachelor's degree in mathematics from the University of Utah and an MBA and Ph.D. from the Stanford Graduate School of Business. In his academic career, he undertook research into complex business problems. Wheelwright and Robert H. Hayes adopted the term "world class manufacturing" to cover the competitive context in which manufacturing businesses could use their operational manufacturing capabilities to strategic advantage.

He served as a mission president for the Church of Jesus Christ of Latter-day Saints (LDS Church) in the England London Mission from 2000 to 2003.

On May 12, 2015, it was announced that effective July 27, 2015, Wheelwright would be succeeded by John S. Tanner as the president of BYU-Hawaii. In November 2015, he began a three-year term as president of the LDS Church's Boston Massachusetts Temple.

He is married to Margaret Steele Wheelwright. They are the parents of five children, including Marianne W. Lewis, former dean of the Cass Business School in London and current dean of the Carl H. Lindner College of Business at the University of Cincinnati.

== See also ==
- Hayes-Wheelwright matrix
