= John S. K. Kauwe III =

American university president (born 1980)

John "Keoni" Sai Keong Kauwe III
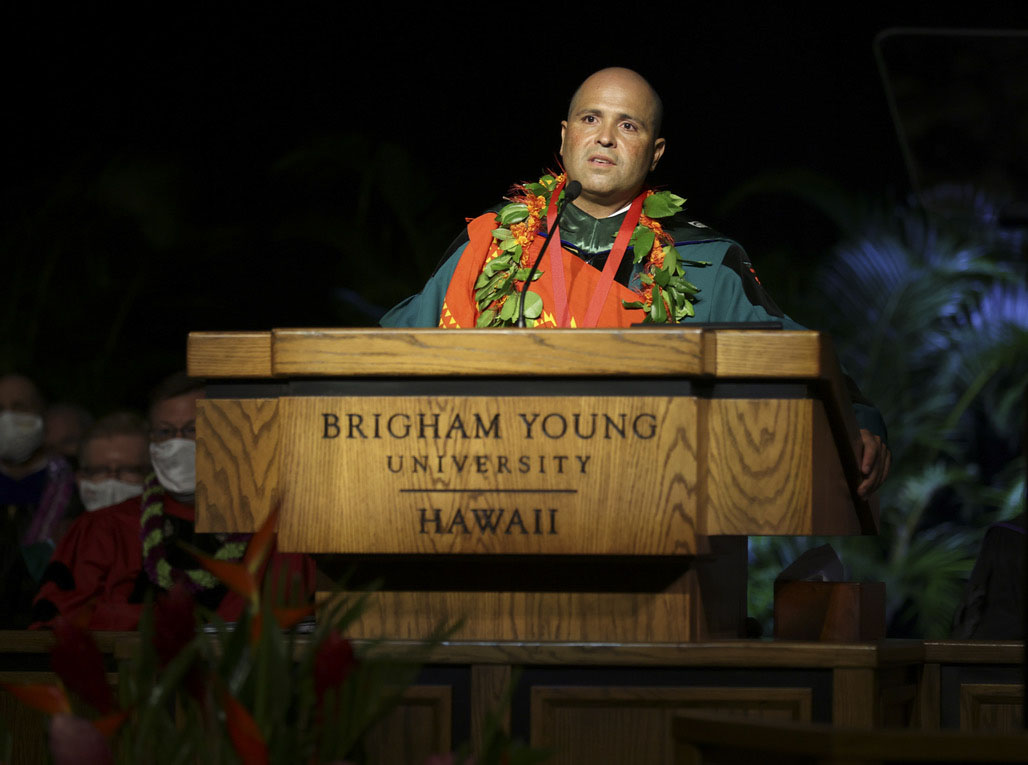
- John S. K. Kauwe III

11th President of Brigham Young University–Hawaii
- Incumbent
- Assumed office July 1, 2020
- Preceded by: John S. Tanner

Personal details
- Born: April 10, 1980 (age 46) Provo, Utah, U.S.
- Spouse: Monica S. Kauwe (m. 2003)
- Children: 5
- Education: Brigham Young University (BS, MS); Washington University in St. Louis (PhD)
- Profession: Geneticist, academic administrator, professor
- Website: biology.byu.edu/kauwe-lab

John "Keoni" Sai Keong Kauwe III (born April 10, 1980) is an American geneticist and academic administrator serving as the 11th president of Brigham Young University–Hawaii (BYU–Hawaii), a position he has held since July 1, 2020. He was also sustained as an area seventy in the Church of Jesus Christ of Latter-day Saints (LDS Church) on April 4, 2024. Kauwe previously served as chair of the Department of Biology and as dean of Graduate Studies at Brigham Young University (BYU) in Provo, Utah. He is a researcher who specializes in the genetics of Alzheimer's disease.

== Early life and education ==
The oldest of seven children, Kauwe was born in Provo, Utah, to John Sai Keong Kauwe Jr. and Rhonda Beth King Kauwe. He is of mixed ethnicity, including Native Hawaiian (kānaka maoli), Chinese, Portuguese, Māori, and Northern European ancestry. He was raised in Orem, Utah, and in Hawaii on the islands of Kauai, Oahu and Molokai, graduating from Molokaʻi High School (formerly Molokai High and Intermediate School) in Hoʻolehua, Hawaii in 1996.

He earned a bachelor's degree in molecular biology (1999) and master's degree in population genetics (2003) at BYU. From 1999 to 2001, he served as a missionary for the LDS Church in the Japan Fukuoka Mission. He received a PhD in evolution, ecology and population biology in 2007 from Washington University in St. Louis, where he also completed a postdoctoral fellowship in Alzheimer's disease genetics at the Washington University School of Medicine in 2008.

== Career ==
Kauwe joined the BYU faculty in 2009 and obtained the rank of full professor in 2018.

Kauwe served at BYU as chair of the Biology Department (2018 to 2019) and as dean of Graduate Studies (2019 to 2020). Kauwe has been the principal investigator on two multicenter grants from the National Institutes of Health Institute on Aging that have included international and multi-institutional collaborations. In 2014, he served as the scientific lead for the international Alzheimer's disease Dream Challenge, a computational crowdsourced project to assess the capabilities of predicting cognitive outcomes in Alzheimer's disease based on high dimensional, publicly available genetic and structural imaging data. Over 3,000 submissions were received and more than 500 scientists worldwide from more than 50 institutions and 10 countries participated in the challenge. This project, an invaluable first-of-its kind contribution, provided a snapshot of both the strengths and limitations in big data analytics of Alzheimer's research.

On May 12, 2020, Jeffrey R. Holland, chairman of the executive committee of the BYU–Hawaii Board of Trustees, announced that Kauwe would succeed John S. Tanner as the institution's president on July 1, 2020.

Kauwe, the first native Hawaiian to lead the university, was officially inaugurated as BYU–Hawaii's 11th president October 19, 2021. The inauguration was delayed for more than a year because of COVID-19 restrictions. Holland presided at the inauguration, with the other members of the executive committee of the Board of Trustees, D. Todd Christofferson, Paul V. Johnson, and Jean B. Bingham, along with Clark G. Gilbert, commissioner of the Church Educational System, also attending.

=== Research ===
Kauwe's professional focus has been primarily studying Alzheimer's disease genetics using a variety of study designs and approaches. He has published more than 120 peer-reviewed papers including publications in the New England Journal of Medicine, Nature, Nature Genetics, PNAS, and PLoS Genetics. He served as a Senior Editor for the journal Alzheimer's & Dementia and was a panelist for the 2015 National Institutes of Health Summit on Alzheimer's disease Research. He served on the Scientific Program Committee for the Alzheimer's Association International Conference. He has had substantial funding from the National Institutes of Health National Institute on Aging (NIA) throughout his career.

In 2021, NIA awarded $14.6-million to a new project titled Natives Engaged in Alzheimer's Research (NEAR) to expand treatment and research on Alzheimer's disease and dementia in American Indian, Alaska Native, Native Hawaiian and Pacific Islander groups. Kauwe is one of three multi-principal investigators on the project.

Kauwe currently serves on the Board of Directors of ʻĀina Momona, a Native Hawaiian led community organization dedicated to environmental sustainability, food security and resilience, and social justice.

Kauwe is co-founder and Scientific Advisory Board chair of Halia Therapeutics, a biotechnology company focused on drug therapies for inflammatory disorders and neurological diseases.

Kauwe has mentored over 100 undergraduates in his research lab at BYU. His research efforts have been conducted with an intentional focus on outreach to populations that are underrepresented in biomedical science.

=== Contributions ===
His recent work in linking the Utah Population Database and Cache County Studies and developing reliable methods for pedigree identification has led to important findings about the relative risk for Alzheimer's disease and novel factors for its resilience.

Since 2013, he has served as the Principal Investigator of Rheumatic Relief, a comprehensive program for public health education, screening, and genetics research designed to prevent and reduce suffering caused by rheumatic heart disease in Samoa. The program has also provided training to indigenous medical professionals. As of 2019, the Rheumatic Relief team, which includes over 50 people each year, has screened more than 20,000 Samoan children for rheumatic heart disease and published significant findings from the first genome-wide association study of rheumatic heart disease susceptibility.

He also conducts research on the genetics of other human traits and diseases (height, biomarkers of inflammation) as well as work on de novo genome assembly and population genetics of marine fish, including bonefish, giant trevally, and bluefin trevally.

Kauwe has long maintained a relationship with Molokaʻi High School, his alma mater, including funded projects to provide scientific mentoring experiences and resources to teachers and students. He also speaks frequently to communities and academic organizations that serve underrepresented populations, including recent engagements in Samoa, Hawaii, and Alaska.

== Personal life ==
Kauwe married Monica Shana Mortensen in 2003 and they have five children. Kauwe is a direct descendant of Kaleohano, who was among the first Native Hawaiians baptized into the LDS Church by George Q. Cannon in the early 1850s.
