= Robert H. Hayes =

American academic

- Education: Stanford University
- Occupation: Academic

Robert H. Hayes is an American academic. He is the emeritus Philip Caldwell Professor of Business Administration at the Harvard Business School.

== Early life ==
Robert H. Hayes received a PhD from Stanford University in 1966.

== Career ==
Hayes worked for IBM and McKinsey & Company.

He became a professor at the Harvard Business School, eventually receiving the Philip Caldwell chair in business administration. He worked with William J. Abernathy. Professor Wickham Skinner was one of their mentors. Hayes and Steven C. Wheelwright adopted the term "world class manufacturing" to cover the competitive context in which manufacturing businesses could use their operational manufacturing capabilities to strategic advantage.

Hayes served as the president of the Production & Operations Management Society. He serves on the board of directors of the American Productivity & Quality Center.

== See also ==
- Hayes-Wheelwright matrix

== Archives and records ==
- Robert H. Hayes papers at Baker Library Special Collections, Harvard Business School.
