= The Church of Jesus Christ of Latter-day Saints in Tonga =

Church in Tonga

- The Nuku'alofa Tonga Temple
- Area: Pacific
- Census: 18,554 (2011)
- Members: 69,594 (2025)
- Stakes: 21
- Districts: 2
- Wards: 141
- Branches: 34
- Total congregations: 175
- Missions: 1
- Temples: 1 operating; 1 under construction; 2 total
- FamilySearch Centers: 24

The Church of Jesus Christ of Latter-day Saints (LDS Church) (Tongan: Siasi ʻo Sīsū Kalaisi ʻo e Kau Māʻoniʻoni ʻi he Ngaahi ʻAho Kimui Ní or Siasi Māmonga) has had a presence in Tonga since 1891. The Tongan Mission was organized in 1916. However, due to anti-Mormon sentiment and government policies, the LDS Church did not grow steadily in Tonga until 1924. Between 1946 and 1956, church leaders published Tongan translations of the scriptures and built a church-sponsored school known as the Liahona School. In 1968, Tonga's first LDS stake was organized and the Nuku'alofa Tonga Temple was dedicated in 1983.

== History ==
Membership in Tonga
Year	Membership
1926	1,000
1930	1,185
1940	1,777
1950	2,820
1960	5,160
1970	14,355
1979	18,563
1989*	31,000
1999	44,819
2009	54,672
2019	66,361
2025	69,594
*Membership was published as a rounded number in 1989. 2011 numbers are based on a national census of those who identify as Latter-day Saint. Source: Wendall J. Ashton; Jim M. Wall, Deseret News, various years, Church Almanac Country Information: Tonga

=== Early missionary efforts ===
The LDS Church first sent Mormon missionaries, Brigham Smoot and Alva J. Butler, to Tonga in July 1891. Upon arriving, they met with the Tongan king, George Tupou I, to obtain his permission to preach. Smoot and Butler bought property and built a mission home, a school, and also purchased a boat to facilitate travel between the islands. The missionaries baptized their first convert, Alipate, in July of the following year. Between 1891 and 1897, missionaries preached and opened schools in various groups of islands including Tongatapu, Ha'apai, and Vava'u. Little progress was made during the first few years as only 16 Tongans joined the LDS Church. Despite apparent interest in the LDS Church among Tongans, European ministers of other Christian churches caused hesitation after initiating concerns regarding polygamy and early church leaders Joseph Smith and Brigham Young. In 1897, the First Presidency of the LDS Church recommended the closing of the Tongan Conference due to its slow progress. Consequently, the First Presidency removed LDS missionaries from Tonga and transferred them to the Samoan Mission.

Missionaries were sent to Tonga once again in 1907 as part of the Samoan Mission. Missionaries began a church school in Nieafu, which gained 28 primary-age students and 13 young adult night students by 1908. A branch, or a small congregation, was organized in the Vava'u village of Ha'alaufuli with 32 members. Missionaries began preaching in Tongatapu, the main island of Tonga, in March 1911. Due to the success of these missionaries, the Tongan Mission was established in 1916. At this time, there were 450 Tongan LDS members, 11 branches, two conferences, and 12 missionaries within the mission.

=== The Passport Act of 1922 ===
During World War I, many missionaries were declined visas to enter Tonga. David O. McKay was quarantined on an island near Tonga for 11 days in 1921 while serving as a member of the Quorum of the Twelve Apostles, the church's presiding body of leaders. These difficulties were caused by anti-Mormon efforts that resulted in the passing of a law in 1922 that prohibited LDS Church members from entering Tonga. The Passport Act of 1922 was enacted primarily because of power struggles that occurred between the Tongan people, Queen Salote and her husband Tungi. As most Mormons foreign to Tonga were American, they were perceived as possible tools of international leverage in these struggles. The Queen and Tungi also had connections to the other major churches in Tonga at the time, which were opposed to the Mormon presence.

After the passing of the law, the Tongan government wrote to the Hawaiian government, the British consul on Hawaii and Hawaiian steamship officials of the ban, that people assisting Mormons in entering Tonga were to be charged $450. Despite Mormon missionaries having to travel through Hawaii to Tonga, the Hawaiian government refused to enforce the ban by denying passport to Mormons applicants, because passport decisions were made by the U.S. Department of State. Hawaii could only warn travelers of the ban. Steamships said they could not enforce the ban either because passports of its passengers did not indicate religion.

Because missionaries could not enter the country, missionary efforts and leadership positions were fulfilled by local church members. Mark Vernon Coombs, president of the LDS Tongan Mission at the time, remained in Tonga despite the lack of missionary presence. Coombs acquired a transcript of the legislative assembly debates regarding the exclusion law, which identified "teaching and practicing polygamy, teaching the people to be disobedient and disrespectful to government authorities, claiming to belong to the church of Jesus Christ, claiming to be saints, and being rude" as some of the reasons for keeping Mormons out of Tonga.

For two years, Coombs created petitions and searched for ways to repeal the country's law. In July 1924, Coombs approached Tongan Chief Justice Strong about the constitutionality of the exclusion law. Strong had an apparent change of heart regarding the church members as "he had learned that the evidence on which he had condemned the Mormons was false and erroneous." A repeal petition of the law was brought before the legislative assembly, to which the assembly voted in favor of a repeal. Foreign Latter-day Saints were allowed to enter Tonga once again. Many local members continued to serve as missionaries throughout the 1930s and 40s. Apostle George Albert Smith visited the church members in 1938; his visit resulted in 117 new converts that year.

=== Tongan translation of the LDS scriptures ===
The lack of printed texts in the Tongan language made it difficult for foreign missionaries to learn the language. Because there were no official church materials available in the Tongan language, the Tongan Mission had to print its own materials for distribution to members and potential converts. The missionaries worked on the translation of church materials into Tongan after learning the language from communicating with locals. In 1935, local LDS Church leader Samuela Fakatou and several other community members were called to serve as mission translators. Due to foreign church leaders' unfamiliarity with the language and the lack of printed references, the Book of Mormon had not yet been translated to the Tongan language. Subsequently, during his 1938 visit, George Albert Smith approved the request of Tongan mission president Emile C. Dunn to translate the book. The work was assigned to Ermel J. Morton, who completed his first draft of the translation by April 1939. Morton's draft was revised by several local church leaders, and then taken to the First Presidency of the LDS Church in Salt Lake City.

Morton and his colleagues anticipated that copies of the new book would be prepared quickly. However, around the same time, Crown Prince Taufa'ahau Tupou IV returned from a trip to Australia where he realized that some changes should be made to the written Tongan language. Morton began working on a revised draft, but felt unacquainted with Tongan grammar. For a year, he studied the language and finally completed his revision on 15 March 1945. The Tongan version of the Book of Mormon was published in April 1946.

In 1956, Morton completed translated drafts of the other standard sacred works used by the church, the Doctrine and Covenants and the Pearl of Great Price. It took three years to proofread these translations, and they were finally published in 1959.

=== Withdrawal of foreign missionaries during World War II ===
Despite the outbreak of World War II in Europe in 1939, missionary efforts in Tonga continued. At the time, mission president Dunn encouraged the people to maintain gardens and extra food supplies. Within a year of the war starting, LDS Church president Heber J. Grant sent a telegram to Dunn directing that all foreign missionaries return to the United States. Dunn arranged for those missionaries to go to Hawaii. In an effort to explain why the missionaries needed to return to America, Dunn stated that Grant was "inspired to call them back". However, this explanation did not quell the rumors of the church being discontinued that were going around the islands. By 1942, missionaries returned to Tonga. Dunn ensured there were at least 15 missionaries in the mission field from 1942 to 1945.

=== Church education in the islands ===
As the LDS Church gained popularity in the Pacific, church-sponsored schools became more common. The Makeke School, founded by Coombs in the 1920s, became the foundation for the later established Liahona College. The church leased 276 acres near Nuku'alofa. The Liahona School opened in 1952 and led to a great expansion of the church. The Liahona School was intended to allow for more students with more hired faculty members and a broader curriculum. The education provided to Tongan students prepared them for life outside of Tonga, whether it was pursuing a secondary education or a job in America. Today, the school is known as Liahona High School.

Soon after the development of Liahona College, the LDS Church pursued the construction of the Church College at Hawaii. These church schools, along with others in New Zealand and Samoa, were considered to be vital to missionary work, as "President McKay considered the schools an adjunct to the mission". All church schools in the Pacific Islands were unified under one board of education, streamlining curriculum and guidelines for students.

=== The 50th Anniversary Golden Jubilee Celebration ===
In 1968, Tongan mission president John H. Groberg declared that a 50th Anniversary Golden Jubilee would be held. The concept for the celebration was confusing to church members as it was unclear what the 50th anniversary was honoring. Groberg was not quite sure himself. However, several years prior to his appointment as mission president, Groberg received inspiration that he would preside over the mission in Tonga and hold a 50th anniversary jubilee during his term. A few months before the celebration, which was scheduled for November, Groberg received a letter from the widow of Tonga's first mission president. In the letter, she shared that the mission's first conference was held in November 1918. The anniversary of the Tonga's first mission-wide conference became the reason for the jubilee.

The celebration was held from 25 November to 1 December 1968 in Tongatapu. King Taufa'ahau Tupou IV and Prime Minister Fatafehi Tuʻipelehake both supported the event and participated in it. Several LDS general authorities attended the Golden Jubilee, including Nathan Eldon Tanner of the First Presidency. 29 November was known as "Remembrance Day", the most important day of the celebration. "Remembrance Day" started out with morning services, in which Groberg, Tanner, and the King of Tonga spoke. Later in the day, over 6,500 people attended the feast and over 11,000 attended the dance festival. After the festivities, it was determined that 507 people were baptized in the month of November and 1,767 people in the entire year. That number of converts in 1968 was more than any other year on record up to that point.

=== Organization of Tonga's first stake ===
From 1952 to 1968, the church membership in Tonga had grown from just over 3,000 members to more than 12,000. The first stake, an organizational unit of multiple local congregations, in Tonga was created in September 1968, allowing for the church to be led by local leaders. By the 1970s, 19 percent of the Tongan population had converted to the LDS Church, "a greater percentage than the Church could claim in any other nation in the world".

== Membership ==
According to the church, its membership as of 2024 was 68,609, which represented approximately 60 percent of Tonga's population. The church also reported 175 congregations, one mission, and one temple. According to the 2011 Tongan census, 18,554 people self-identify as Mormon, making it the second-largest religion in the country, ahead of Catholicism and behind Methodism which is a stark contrast to more than 50,000 members the LDS Church reported during that time. LDS Church membership statistics are different from self-reported statistics, mainly because the LDS Church does not remove an individual's name from its membership rolls based on disengagement from the church.

== Stakes and districts ==
Stake/District	Organized
'Eua Tonga Stake	25 Feb 1996
Ha'apai Tonga Lulunga District	3 Feb 1992
Ha'apai Tonga Stake	14 Jun 1983
Neiafu Vava'u Tonga Central Stake	26 Nov 2017
Neiafu Vava'u Tonga North Stake	27 Aug 1980
Neiafu Vava'u Tonga Stake	4 Dec 1975
Neiafu Vava'u Tonga West Stake	27 Aug 1995
Niua Tonga District	14 Jun 1998
Nuku'alofa Tonga Capital Stake	19 Nov 2017
Nuku'alofa Tonga Central Stake	31 Jul 1994
Nuku'alofa Tonga East Stake	21 Jul 1971
Nuku'alofa Tonga Ha'akame Stake	10 Mar 1996
Nuku'alofa Tonga Halaliku Stake	4 Aug 1995
Nuku'alofa Tonga Harbour Stake	22 Jun 2008
Nuku'alofa Tonga Kolomotu'a Stake	9 Oct 1983
Nuku'alofa Tonga Liahona Stake	31 Aug 1980
Nuku'alofa Tonga Malapo Stake	8 Dec 2013
Nuku'alofa Tonga Matahau Stake	20 May 2012
Nuku'alofa Tonga Mu'a Stake	21 Apr 1996
Nuku'alofa Tonga South Stake	26 Jul 1970
Nuku'alofa Tonga Stake	5 Sep 1968
Nuku'alofa Tonga Vaini Stake	15 Jun 1983
Nuku'alofa Tonga West Stake	26 Jul 1970

== Mission ==
When the first LDS Church missionaries arrived in Tonga on 15 July 1891, Tonga was part of the church's Samoan Mission. In 1916, the Tongan Mission was organized. The mission at the time included much of the South Pacific. On 23 July 1971, the Tonga Mission was divided and the Fiji Mission was created from it.

On 11 August 2016, King George Tupou VI unveiled a monument in honor of the founding of the LDS Tonga mission, which marked the official start of a week-long celebration of the 100th anniversary of the mission's creation.

== Temples ==
Temples in Tonga
Red = Operating
Yellow = Announced
Blue = Under Construction
Black = Closed for Renovations

In April 1980, it was announced that a temple would be built in Tonga. In the LDS faith, a temple differs from an ordinary church meetinghouse as it is used for special forms of worship. On 18 February 1981, LDS Church president Spencer W. Kimball broke ground and dedicated the land for the new temple. The site is right next to the Liahona School as it is tradition for temples in the Pacific islands to be adjacent to LDS Church schools. Over 7,000 people, including King Taufa'ahau Tupou IV, gathered to witness the groundbreaking and dedication. Plans for the temple were completed in November 1981.

The construction of the temple was completed ten days ahead of schedule, allowing for more non-member guests to visit the temple before the dedication. The King of Tonga was given a private tour of the temple by previous Tongan mission president John Groberg to explain the purposes of the building. Before its formal dedication, over 50 percent of the Tongan population had toured the temple. The church's Nuku'alofa Tonga Temple was dedicated in 1983 by Gordon B. Hinckley as Kimball was ill and could not attend the dedication. There were seven dedicatory sessions held, most of which took place in the Liahona School gymnasium. 15,000 people were in attendance of these sessions.

The Nuku'alofa Temple was renovated in 2007, followed by a rededication by Russell M. Nelson on 4 November. A cultural celebration was held on 3 November, and over 40,000 visitors toured the temple prior to the rededication.

On 7 April 2019, a second temple to be built in Tonga was announced. The temple will be in Neiafu and will be located adjacent to the church-owned Saineha High School.

23. Nuku'alofa Tonga Temple; Official website; News & images	
Location: Announced: Groundbreaking: Dedicated: Rededicated: Size: Notes:	Nukuʻalofa, Tonga; 2 April 1980 by Spencer W. Kimball; 18 February 1981 by Spencer W. Kimball; 9 August 1983 by Gordon B. Hinckley; 4 November 2007 by Russell M. Nelson; 21,184 sq ft (1,968.1 m^{2}) on a 1.2-acre (0.49 ha) site - designed by Emil B. Fetzer; The Tongan temple was rededicated 4 November 2007 following remodeling that began in June 2006.
237. Neiafu Tonga Temple (Under construction); Official website; News & images	
Location: Announced: Groundbreaking: Size:	Neiafu, Tonga; 7 April 2019 by Russell M. Nelson; 11 September 2021 by ‘Inoke F. Kupu; 17,000 sq ft (1,600 m^{2}) on a 4.81-acre (1.95 ha) site

== See also ==
- Religion in Tonga
