= Eric B. Shumway =

American university administrator (born 1939)

Eric B. Shumway (born 1939) was the president of Brigham Young University–Hawaii (BYU-Hawaii) from 1994 to 2007. After completing his service as university president, he served as president of the Nuku'alofa Tonga Temple of the Church of Jesus Christ of Latter-day Saints (LDS Church) from 2007 to 2010.

Shumway was born in Holbrook, Arizona. From 1959 to 1962 he served as a missionary for the LDS Church in Tonga. For part of his mission, he served as district president on the island of Tongatapu. He developed the system of po malanga (preaching at night) and po hiva (night singing) that allowed for village-wide sharing of the church's teachings with those not ready for one-on-one meetings. He also used the Kava circle to share the gospel, and with his proficiency in the chiefly language of Tonga was made matapule (talking chief) of Faivaola in May 1961 by Nuku, a noble of Tonga. Under the direction of his mission president, M. Vernon Coombs, created a set of lessons for use in Tonga that focused on presentation and preaching instead of questions and answers as this was felt to better conform to Tongan cultural norms.

After his mission, Shumway married Carolyn Merrill, and they are the parents of seven children.

Shumway received bachelor's and master's degrees in English from Brigham Young University in 1964 and 1966 and a Ph.D. in English from the University of Virginia in 1973. Shumway began his association with BYU-Hawaii in 1966 as an instructor in the English Department.

Shumway has served in many leadership positions within the LDS Church. In 1968, Shumway became the first bishop of the church's Hauula 2nd Ward. From 1973 to 1977 he served on the high council of the Laie Hawaii Stake. In 1977, when the first student stake at BYU-Hawaii was organized, Shumway became the stake president. From 1986 to 1989 Shumway served as president of the Tonga Nukuʻalofa Mission. From 2004 to 2007, Shumway served as an area seventy in the church's North America West Area, which included Hawaii and California.

Shumway served as Academic Vice President at BYU-Hawaii from 1980 to 1986 and again from 1990 to 1994. Shumway had also served on the board of directors of the Polynesian Cultural Center.

During Shumway's tenure as president of BYU-Hawaii, the school focused on increasing the percentage of students from outside the United States. Among other programs, there were scholarships granted where officials of foreign governments were allowed to help determine who received the scholarship. Thailand was among the countries included in this initiative.

Shumway edited a book entitled Tongan Saints: Legacy of Faith, a collection of the experiences of various Latter-day Saints in Tonga that was published as part of the celebration of the church's centennial in Tonga.

== Works ==
- Shumway, Eric B. (1966). The literary relationships of John Gay's Dione to the English pastoral drama: the restoration tragedy, and the eighteenth century pastoral eclogue (MA). Department of English, Brigham Young University. OCLC 367527876.
- —— (1967). Lessons in Tongan. Honolulu: Peace Corps Training Center, University of Hawaii. OCLC 9090315.
- —— (1971). Intensive course in Tongan: with numerous supplementary materials, grammatical notes, and glossary. Honolulu: University of Hawaii Press. ISBN 0-87022-757-2. OCLC 162958.
- —— (1991). Tongan Saints: Legacy of Faith. Laie, Hawaii: Institute for Polynesian Studies, Brigham Young University–Hawaii. ISBN 0-939154-52-8. OCLC 23144746.
