= Liahona High School =

School in Tonga

Coordinates: 21.1611°S 175.2746°W

Liahona High School is a high school in Tonga owned and operated by the Church of Jesus Christ of Latter-day Saints (LDS Church). The school is named after the Liahona, a religious artifact described in the Book of Mormon, which gave a family direction in the wilderness. As of 2022, it is one of six LDS schools on Tongatapu, the main island of Tonga.

Liahona High School was established in 1948, as a successor to the previous LDS school, Makeke College. It was originally called Liahona College, but was given its current name in 1959. It has been central to the growth of the LDS Church in Tonga.

The high school also was central to the LDS Church's expansion to Kiribati. Many graduates of Auriaria Kokoi Ataria School in Kiribati went to Liahona High School in the early 1970s and joined the LDS Church while there. The first LDS missionaries in Kiribati were Liahona High School graduates sent back to Kiribiti to serve as missionaries there.

After the 2022 Hunga Tonga–Hunga Ha'apai eruption and tsunami, the school served as a shelter for approximately 1,000 people.

== Notable alumni ==
- Viliami Tolutaʻu (born 1951), sculptor and an emeritus university professor

== See also ==
- Church Educational System
