= Apia Samoa Temple =

Latter-day Saints temple in Samoa

- Interactive map of Apia Samoa Temple
- Number: 22
- Dedication: 5 August 1983, by Gordon B. Hinckley
- Site: 2 acres (0.81 ha)
- Floor area: 18,691 ft^{2} (1,736.5 m^{2})
- Height: 75 ft (23 m)
- Official website • News & images

Church chronology
← Atlanta Georgia Temple	Apia Samoa Temple	→ Nuku'alofa Tonga Temple

Additional information
- Announced: 15 October 1977, by Spencer W. Kimball
- Groundbreaking: 19 October 1981, by Dennis E. Simmons
- Open house: 19–30 July 1983; 6–27 August 2005
- Rededicated: 4 September 2005, by Gordon B. Hinckley
- Current president: Uele Va’aulu
- Designed by: Naylor, Wentworth, Lund
- Location: Apia, Samoa
- Coordinates: 13°50′17″S 171°46′59″W
- Exterior finish: Granite
- Baptistries: 1
- Ordinance rooms: 2 (two-stage progressive)
- Sealing rooms: 2
- Clothing rental: Yes
- Notes: The original Samoa temple was dedicated in 1983 and destroyed by fire while the temple was closed for renovations in 2003. This new temple of a similar design was built on the same site although it is substantially larger. The LDS Church continues to list this as the 22nd operating temple, in accordance to its original dedication date.

The Apia Samoa Temple is a temple of the Church of Jesus Christ of Latter-day Saints, located in Pesega, near Apia, Samoa. The intent to build the temple was announced on October 15, 1977, by church president Spencer W. Kimball. A groundbreaking ceremony was held on February 19, 1981, also presided over by Kimball. It was the first built in Samoa, the third in Polynesia, and church's 22nd operating temple. The temple has a modern, single-spire design finished in granite, with a statue of the angel Moroni on its top.

During later renovations, a fire on July 9, 2003, destroyed the original building, but it was reconstructed on the same site with a larger footprint, improved layout, and higher-quality materials, along with a sprinkler system (that was required by more modern building codes). The rebuilt temple was rededicated on September 4, 2005, by church president Gordon B. Hinckley.

== History ==
The intent to construct a temple in Apia, Samoa, was announced by the church on October 15, 1977. A revised plan, changing the location from Pago Pago, American Samoa, to Apia, was introduced by church president Spencer W. Kimball on April 2, 1980, as part of a broader announcement of new temples in Polynesia. A groundbreaking ceremony and site dedication was held on February 19, 1981, with Kimball presiding.

After construction of the original temple was completed, a public open house was held on July 19, 1983. The dedication was done by Gordon B. Hinckley in seven sessions starting August 5, 1983. The site was approximately 1.7 acres and featured a “R-wall” exterior finish over insulated concrete block with a cedar-shake roof, with two ordinance rooms, three sealing rooms, and about 14,560 square feet.

=== Fire and reconstruction ===
On the evening of July 9, 2003, while closed for renovations to add a baptistry, the temple was destroyed in a fire—the first time an operational temple had burned in church history. It was the second temple destroyed by fire, following the original Nauvoo Temple. The angel Moroni statue was still intact, and no injuries or loss of records occurred. The Deseret News reported that the temple president saw that in the morning's first light, the statue of Moroni was still there, and was shining gold, rather than black. Members saw the statue as a symbol that a new temple would be built on the site. One week after the fire, on July 16, 2003, the First Presidency announced plans to rebuild the temple, and the damaged remains were demolished by the end of that month. Despite the structure being destroyed, church members gathered to celebrate the 20th anniversary of the dedication of the temple nearly a month after the fire.

A second groundbreaking for the reconstruction took place on October 19, 2003, presided over by Dennis E. Simmons, of the Seventy. During the rebuild, a dated meetinghouse on the property was razed, and a replacement chapel was constructed across the street. Joseph Stehlin, a local bishop, who originally laid the first ceremonial block of the temple in 1982, repeated the honor on May 5, 2004.

The same angel Moroni statue was placed on top the new temple’s spire on January 25, 2005. A public open house for the rebuilt temple occurred from August 6 to 27, 2005, excluding Sundays. The rededication took place on September 4, 2005, conducted by church president Hinckley. The reconstructed temple retained a similar design but featured higher-quality materials, a more efficient layout, and expanded space—totaling 18,691 square feet, with the outside finished in granite.

Approximately 45,000 people toured the temple during the open house, and around 16,040 church members attended the rededication sessions.

== Design and architecture ==
The Apia Samoa Temple has a modern architectural design. According to the BYU Religious Studies Center, a local newspaper stated the temple was a revered landmark, with Mount Vaea as a backdrop.

The temple is on a 1.7-acre plot of land. The surrounding area has a patron arrival center and lodging accommodations to support temple attendance by members traveling from neighboring islands.

The structure is finished in granite. It has a single spire located, with a statue of the angel Moroni on its top. The design closely resembles the original temple dedicated in 1983, but following its destruction by fire in 2003, the reconstructed version was built with improved materials, a more efficient layout, and an increase of over 4,000 square feet, bringing the total area to 18,691 square feet. Including the angel Moroni statue, the temple is 212 feet above ground level.

The architectural work was done by Naylor, Wentworth & Lund Architects of Salt Lake City. Bud Bailey Construction and Jacobsen Construction were the contractors involved, and William Naylor served as project manager.

The interior includes two ordinance rooms, two sealing rooms, and a baptistry.

== Renovations and community impact ==
The Apia Samoa Temple was undergoing a renovation project to enlarge the baptistry (adding 12 oxen statues to support the font), foyer, and administrative offices when it was destroyed by fire on July 9, 2003. Because the building was completely lost during this phase, the renovation was never completed, and the original temple was instead demolished and rebuilt.

The Deseret News reported that the temple was important to other religions and community leaders in the area, with the Methodist Church sending a letter and a check, the deputy prime minister sharing regards, and an editorial in a local newspaper, the Samoa Observer, said that the destruction of the temple was “a tragedy for everyone.” The temple president, Daniel A. Betham, stated that Samoa was a very religious place, and members of other churches saw the temple as just as important as their own meetinghouses.

== Temple presidents ==
The church's temples are directed by a temple president and matron, each typically serving for a term of three years. The president and matron oversee the administration of temple operations and provide guidance and training for both temple patrons and staff.

Serving from 1983 to 1986, the first president was Charles I. Sampson, with Thelma S. Sampson serving as matron. As of 2023, Uele Va’aulu is the president, with Lolini A. Va’aulu serving as matron. Tufuga Samuelu Atoa served as president from 1986 to 1989, Helen E. Atoa serving as matron.

== Admittance ==
On July 19, 1983, a public open house was held, before its dedication by Gordon B. Hinckley in seven sessions starting on August 5, 1983. Like all the church's temples, it is not used for Sunday worship services. To members of the church, temples are regarded as sacred houses of the Lord. Once dedicated, only church members with a current temple recommend can enter for worship. In Samoa, chapels of other faiths are called “Malumalu’s, meaning ‘temple’ in the Samoan translation of the Bible, however, members only use the term to describe temples built by their faith, not meetinghouses.

== See also ==
Temples in the Samoan Islands
- = Operating
- = Under construction
- = Announced
- = Temporarily Closed
- Comparison of temples of The Church of Jesus Christ of Latter-day Saints
- List of temples of The Church of Jesus Christ of Latter-day Saints
- List of temples of The Church of Jesus Christ of Latter-day Saints by geographic region
- Temple architecture (Latter-day Saints)
- The Church of Jesus Christ of Latter-day Saints in Samoa
