= Changeover =

Process of converting a line or machine from running one product to another

In manufacturing, changeovers are also called "changeover times", which is the time and process it takes to convert a machine from making one product, to a different product. Its the time between one product being finished, and a new product beginning. Changeover times are very versatile, ranging from minutes to months. Changeover happens where time and processes take place to remove old products and materials from the manufacturing line. Then time is taken to set up new materials and equipment for the new product the manufacturing facility is changing over to. Adjustments are then done after the new equipment is started to ensure the new product is being properly assembled.

== The Process of Changeover ==
The process of changeover usually involves paying close attention to the tools needed for a machine to make specific parts of a product and ridding a machine of parts not needed for the new product being manufactured. A team will measure changeover time by keeping tabs on the time a production will end and the time until another production begins in the manufacturing plant. Keeping tabs on the time will be useful for identifying what processes will make changeover quicker and more efficiently in a manufacturing plant.

In most manufacturing processes, especially mass production, manufacturers aim to reduce the quantity of changeovers rather than the time. This does have the disadvantage of having a higher amount of defects in the production process. However, lean manufacturing plants aim to reduce changeover time due to the constant need of changing products because of batch production. A principle of lean manufacturing is the SMED system. SMED is "Single Minute Exchange of Dies". Dies refers to "specialized manufacturing tools". The SMED system has a goal to reduce a Changeover from hours to under 10 minutes.

=== Disadvantages and Advantages ===
There are advantages to cutting down changeover time. It will lower the rate of defects within the production line, which means more products will make it to the end of the manufacturing process. Lower changeover time can lead to higher reliability, sustainability, and efficiency. Reducing changeover time can help a company save money and time while giving them the ability to produce and deliver more products to businesses and customers. Having lower changeover time also gives manufacturing facilities more time to work on other processes to help them flourish. Minimizing changeover times can also lead to discoveries of more efficient processes that teams might want to use later on to improve the plant. Some ways to reduce changeover time are preparing materials, checking equipment, staying organized, and using a checklist.
