= Job shop =

Small manufacturing systems that handle custom manufacturing processes

A job shop is a manufacturing system that handles custom/bespoke or semi-custom/bespoke manufacturing processes such as small to medium-size customer orders or batch jobs.
