= Pesega =

Village on the island of Upolu in Samoa

Coordinates: 13°50′S 171°47′W

Pesega is a village on the island of Upolu in Samoa. It is located on western outskirts of Apia, the country's capita. Pesega is part of Faleata West Electoral Constituency (Faipule District) which forms part of the larger political district of Tuamasaga.

The population of Pesega is 141.

Located in the village is the headquarters of the Church of Jesus Christ of Latter-day Saints (LDS Church) in Samoa with the large white Apia Samoa Temple by the main road. The LDS Church College Pesega, is located behind the temple grounds.
