= Mission president =

Geographical leader of the Church of Jesus Christ of Latter-day Saints

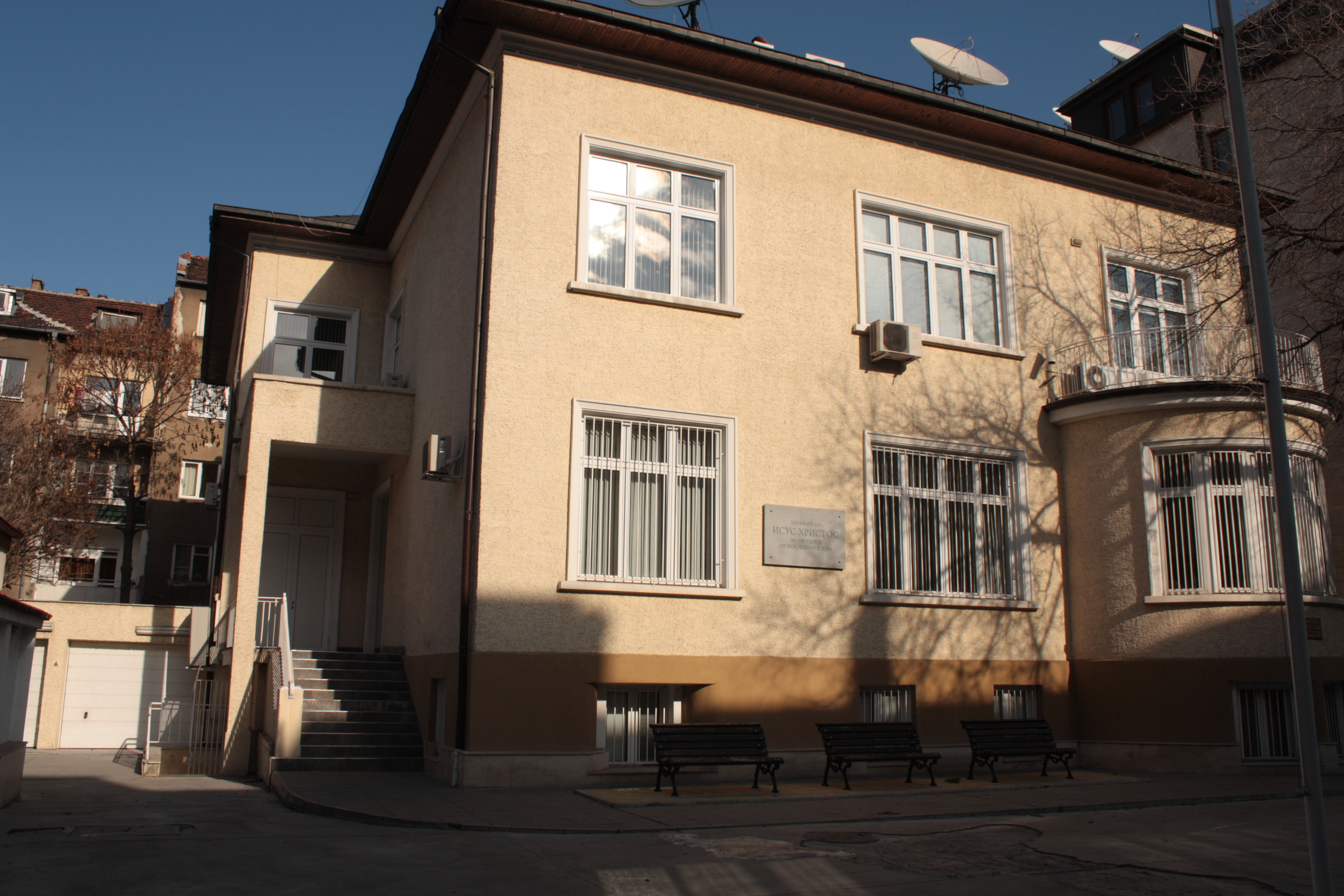
The mission home for the Bulgaria Sofia Mission. A mission home is the official residence of a mission president.

Mission president is a priesthood leadership position in the Church of Jesus Christ of Latter-day Saints (LDS Church). A mission president presides over a geographic area known as a mission and the missionaries serving in the mission. Depending on the particular mission, a mission president may also be the presiding priesthood leader of some or all Latter-day Saints within the geographic boundaries of the mission. Mission presidents are ordained high priests of the church.

== Selection ==
Mission presidents are assigned to a mission by the leadership of the LDS Church and typically discover the location a few months before their departure. Mission presidents are men typically between 40 and 65 years old. In the past some mission presidents have been much younger; LeGrand Richards and Stephen R. Covey both served as mission presidents while in their 20s and Thomas S. Monson became a mission president at age 31. In more recent years younger mission presidents have been more rare. In 2005, there were 130 new mission presidents, the youngest of them, Norbert Ounleu, was 35. The only mission president called under the age of 30 since 2005 was Kerving H. Joseph, who was 29 when he became president of the Haiti Port-au-Prince Mission in 2009.

Mission presidents are generally assigned to areas other than where they reside at the time of their call. There are exceptions, such as Richard G. Hinckley, who presided over the Utah Salt Lake City Mission. In 2009, at least two of the newly called mission presidents resided within the boundaries of the missions over which they served: Kerving H. Joseph (who was then still the president of the Haiti Port-au-Prince mission at the time of the 2010 Port-au-Prince earthquake) and Claude R. Gamiette, a native and resident of Guadeloupe, who was appointed president of West Indies Mission, which covered Guadeloupe. Tonga has also had a few men native to the country who were residing in the islands when called to serve as presidents of the Tongan mission. Effian Kadarusman, an Indonesian, served as president of the Indonesia Jakarta Mission for four years in the 1980s. With over 400 missions, there are few which have a president who was a resident in the mission boundaries at the time of his call at any given time. An example of an exception occurred in approximately 2005, when the church decided to have Venezuelan natives serve as presidents of all the local missions due to growing discord between the United States and Venezuela, but often the presidents were from areas of Venezuela other than where they were called to.

According to current policy, a mission president must be married. Typically, his wife and any dependent children accompany him on his mission. During the first 100 years of the church, there were some single mission presidents and several others who left their wives and children elsewhere while they served. On the other hand, when Wilford Woodruff presided over the Eastern States Mission in the 1840s his wife, Phoebe, was set apart to serve with him. Brigham Young, Jr., not only had his wife, Catherine Curtis Spencer Young, serving with him while he presided over the British Mission in the 1860s but one of their children was born while they were there. When Heber J. Grant brought his wife and six daughters with him when he came to preside over the British Mission in 1903, Francis M. Lyman looked unfavorably upon this new innovation.

Mission presidents are either retired or leave their vocations for three years to preside over their mission. They live in properties owned or leased by the LDS Church, which also covers basic living and household expenses for mission presidents. Prominent examples include former United States Congressman Wayne Owens, former Governor of Utah Norm Bangerter, two-time Major League Baseball Most Valuable Player Award recipient Dale Murphy, and Harvard Business School professor Steven C. Wheelwright. They usually receive training in late June and begin the service about the first of July, unless there are emergencies or medical conditions that require otherwise.

Candidates are typically interviewed in the last few months of each year, initially by a member of the Quorum of the Twelve Apostles. If candidates are chosen, the First Presidency extends the call to serve. The official announcements of new mission presidents is typically done through the first few months of the subsequent year via the weekly Church News.

Unlike most positions in the church, when they are initially called, mission presidents are not subject to the common consent acceptance of any body of members. Once serving, they are subject to frequent votes of common consent in branches and districts over which the mission president presides.

== Administrative responsibilities ==
Mission presidents generally supervise a group that ranges between 60 and 200 missionaries and direct their missionary labors. Missionaries are typically between the ages of 18 and 25, but can also include senior-aged couples and older single women.

Mission presidents are usually assisted by two counselors, who reside within the mission boundaries, in overseeing areas of the mission boundaries that are not organized into stakes; the three men together constitute the mission presidency and are each given the honorific title "President". The counselors serve in the mission presidency for varying periods of time while maintaining their regular employment. The responsibilities of the counselors are generally oriented towards the members of the church within the mission, often organized into districts and branches.

Additionally, mission presidents are assisted by two or more full-time missionaries under the title of "assistant to the president", whose duties are primarily directed toward supervision of the missionary work, under the direction of the mission president. These assistants lead an independent hierarchy that may or may not correspond with local church units.

The role of a mission president's wife varies depending on the age of her children and her background. She typically joins her husband in conferences or other major church gatherings, and is often invited to give remarks before as his companion. If she has extra time after taking care of the children, she may assist with mission supplementary works such as medical, transportation or catering.

== Spiritual responsibilities ==
Mission presidents are assigned to train and watch over the missionaries who serve under their direction. Mission presidents are typically respected and admired by the missionaries they supervise. Obedience to the mission president is considered a vital part of missionary work.

In areas within mission boundaries where there are no stakes, the mission president is the presiding church authority. In those circumstances, the mission is divided into districts which are composed of branches. In that role, he serves in a capacity similar to that of a stake president.

While missionaries have responsibility for the spiritual progress of those investigating the church in their individual area, the mission president is responsible for all those investigating the church within the mission boundaries, and in special cases interviews those desiring to be baptized.
