= Brigham Young University–Hawaii =

Private college in Lāʻie, Hawaii, US

- Former name: Church College of Hawaii (1955–1974)
- Motto: Enter to learn, go forth to serve
- Type: Private college
- Established: September 26, 1955; 71 years ago
- Parent institution: Church Educational System
- Accreditation: WSCUC
- Religious affiliation: The Church of Jesus Christ of Latter-day Saints
- President: John S. K. Kauwe III
- Faculty: 127 faculty, 105 adjunct faculty (Fall 2023)
- Students: 2,822 (Fall 2025)
- Location: Lāʻie, Hawaii, United States; 21°38′29″N 157°55′31″W
- Campus: Rural, 100 acres (40 ha)
- Newspaper: Ke Alaka'i
- Colors: Red, white, gold
- Mascot: Seasiders
- Website: www.byuh.edu
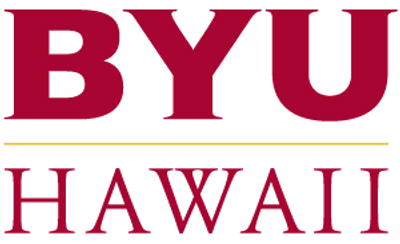

Brigham Young University–Hawaii (BYU–Hawaii) is a private college in Lāʻie, Hawaii, United States. It is owned and operated by the Church of Jesus Christ of Latter-day Saints (LDS Church). BYU–Hawaii was founded in 1955 and it became a satellite campus of Brigham Young University (BYU) in 1974. In 2004, it was made a separate institution. The college's sole focus is on undergraduate education.

The institution is broadly organized into four colleges and its parent organization, the Church Educational System (CES), sponsors sister schools in Utah and Idaho. Approximately 97 percent of the college's 2,800 students are members of the LDS Church. BYU–Hawaii students are required to follow the Church Educational System Honor Code, which requires behavior in line with LDS teachings.

== History ==
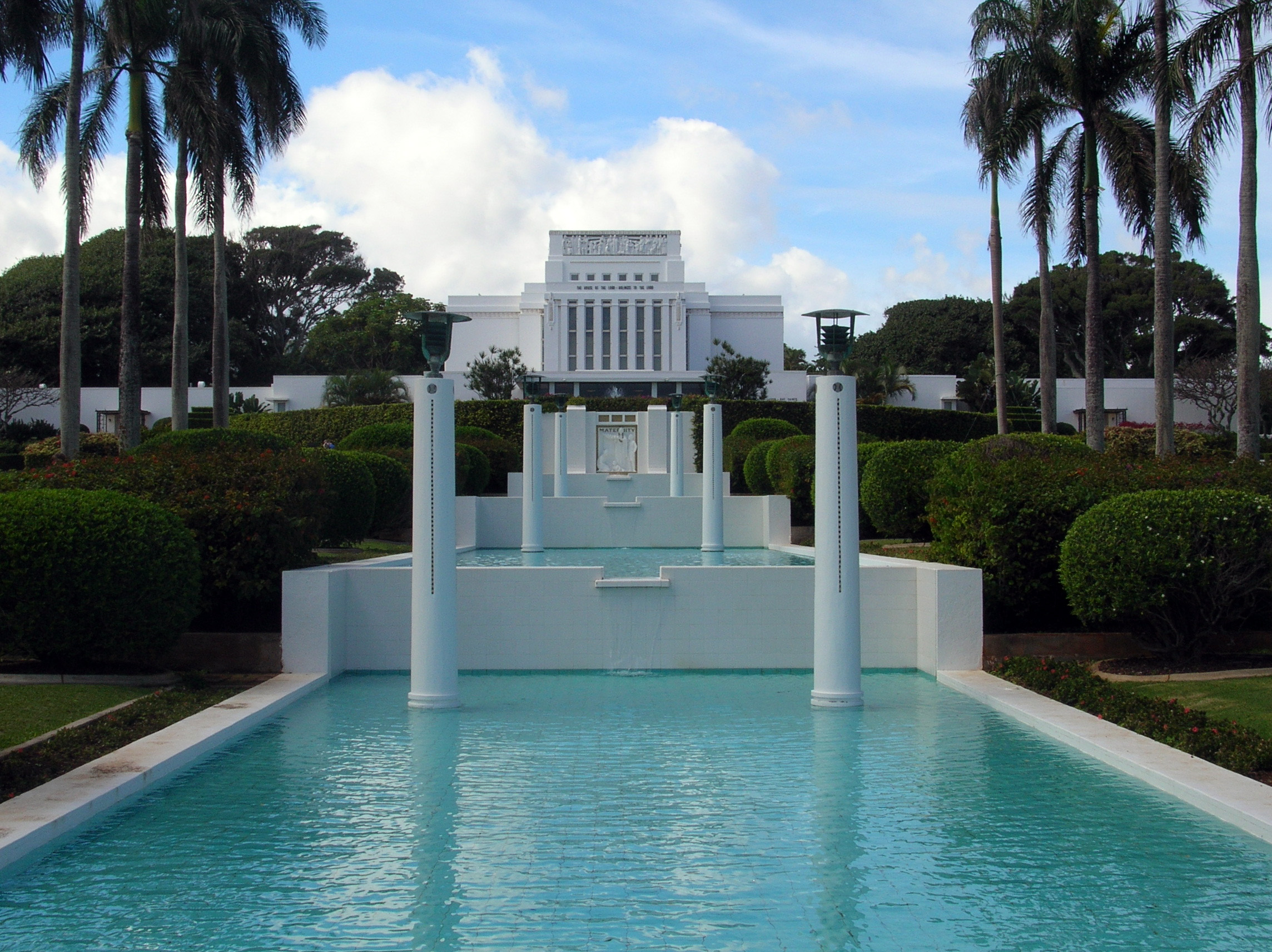
The building of the LDS Church's Lāiʻe Hawaii Temple was a key predecessor to the establishment of BYU–Hawaii.

The LDS Church was established in the islands in 1850 following the Edict of Toleration promulgated by Kamehameha III, giving the underground Hawai‘i Catholic Church the right to worship, while at the same time allowing other faith traditions to begin establishing themselves. By 1919, the church was prominent enough in the area to build a temple in Lāiʻe. Two years after the temple was dedicated then-LDS Church apostle David O. McKay stated the church would build a school in the area in the future. In 1951, McKay, as church president, began preliminary plans on the school, and in 1955 ground was broken for the new institution. Classes began at BYU–Hawaii in September 1955 as the Church College of Hawaii to accommodate the burgeoning LDS population in the Territory of Hawai‘i. This was largely a result of McKay's views on both education and strengthening the church outside of its longtime intermountain west U.S. base. The original class consisted of 153 students and 20 faculty meeting in old World War II buildings, with Reuben D. Law as the school's first president. The school's first buildings were dedicated on December 17, 1958. The college was at first a two-year college but was reorganized in 1959 to become a four-year college. Construction missionaries built dormitories, a cafeteria, and other buildings. By 1961 the college had been granted four-year accreditation by the Western Association of Schools and Colleges.

LDS elders established the Polynesian Cultural Center in November 1963 as a means of preserving the Pacific cultures that the Latter-day Saints had encountered in their missionary work. In the 1970s, the school was also used to teach LDS missionaries Pacific languages and cultures before going out to the islands. The center also provided jobs for students of the college. In 1974, the Church College of Hawaii was renamed Brigham Young University–Hawaii by the Church Board of Education and began reporting to the president of BYU in Provo, Utah.

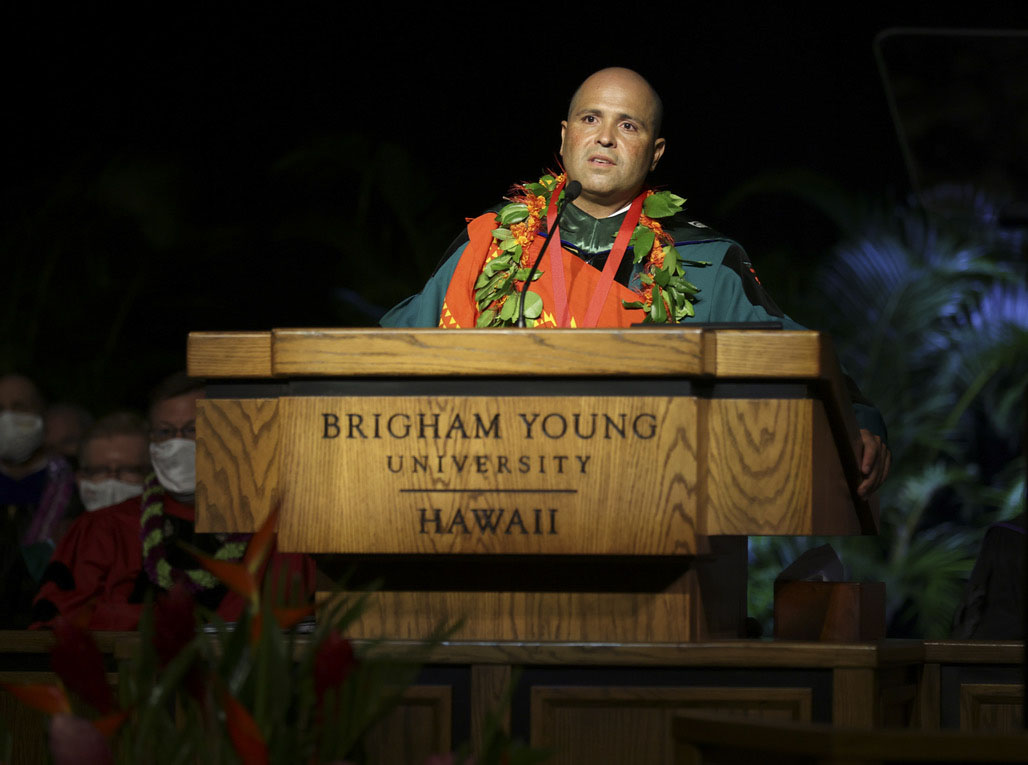
John S. K. Kauwe III, the first Kānaka Maoli president of BYU–Hawaii

The school was governed as a satellite campus of BYU until 2004, when it was announced that the school would report directly to the Commissioner of Church Education. In 2007, Steven C. Wheelwright was appointed the college's president. On May 12, 2015, Russell M. Nelson, chairman of the Executive Committee of the BYU-Hawaii Board of Trustees announced that effective July 27, 2015, John S. Tanner would succeed Wheelwright as president. On May 12, 2020, Jeffrey R. Holland, chairman of the Executive Committee of the BYU–Hawaii Board of Trustees, announced that Tanner would be succeeded as the institution's president by John S. K. Kauwe III on July 1, 2020.

== Campus ==
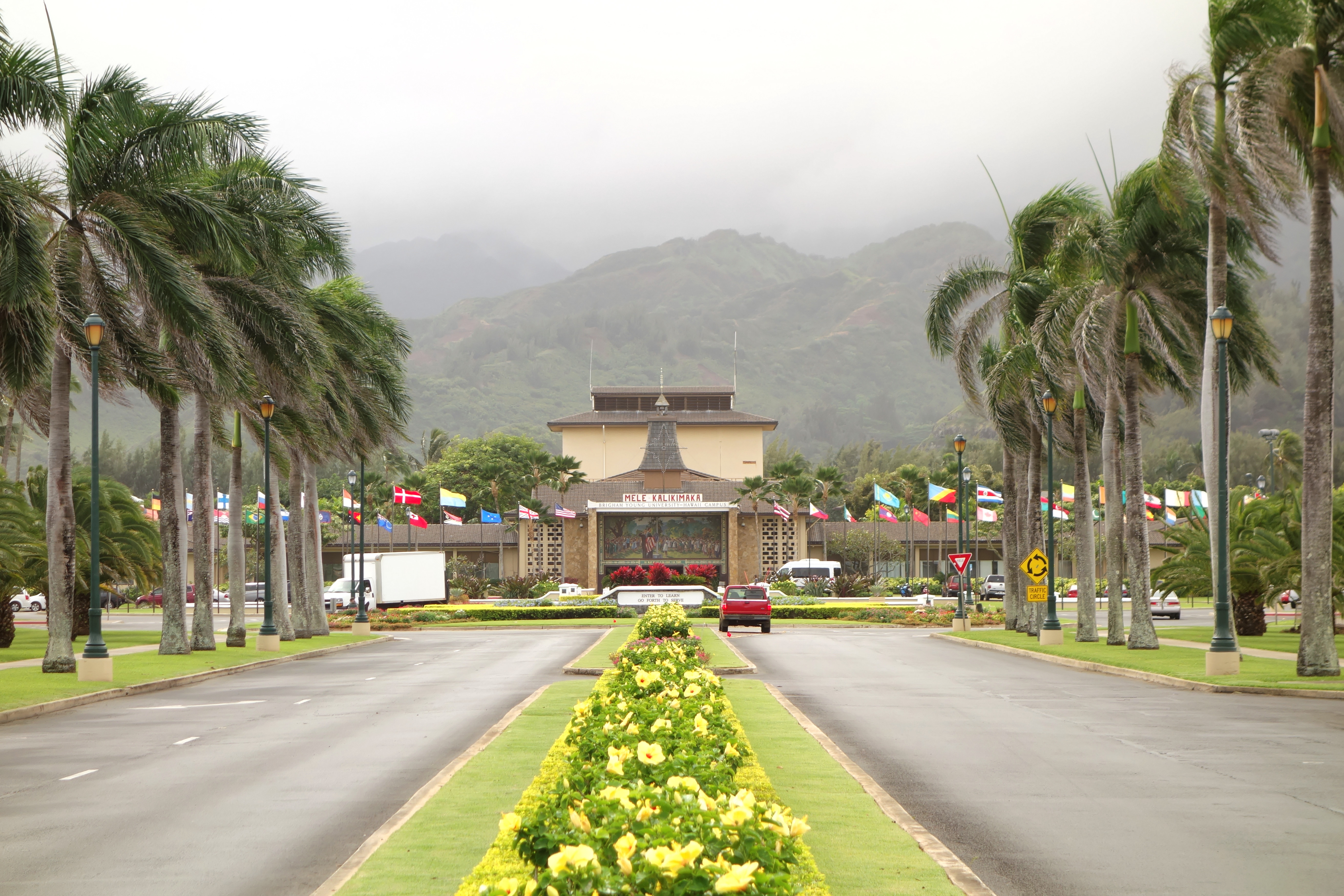
Little Circle in front of the McKay complex, December 2013

BYU–Hawaii is located in Lāiʻe on the north shore of Oahu, about 35 miles (56 km) north of Honolulu. The campus covers 100 acres (0.40 km^{2}; 0.16 sq mi) between the mountains and the ocean shore. The Polynesian Cultural Center is directly east of campus and the Lāiʻe Hawaii Temple is on the northwest.

The campus includes several instructional facilities, including the David O. McKay Classroom Building, the Heber J. Grant Building, and the Science Building. The school's library is the two-story Joseph F. Smith Library.

Dormitories, known as hales, are located on the south end of campus. The Temple View Apartments provide housing for married students. These apartments are next to the Lāiʻe Hawaii Temple which is located directly adjacent to the campus.

== Academics ==
=== Admissions and demographics ===
LDS students pay less for tuition than non-LDS students. Students who have been on LDS missions and have attended LDS seminary or institute classes are also given particular consideration. However, LDS Church membership is not a requirement for attendance. Students are typically expected to have had at least a B average in high school, and an ACT score of 26 or SAT score of 1130 or above. Non-native English speakers must receive a 61 or higher on the IBT TOEFL (500 on the paper test), a 5.5 on IELTS, or 75+ on the Michigan language test.

Approximately 97% of the student body are LDS Church members.

== Organization ==
BYU–Hawaii offers 37 bachelor's degree programs, with a 16:1 student/faculty ratio.

In Fall 2018, BYU–Hawaii restructured its academic organization from four colleges to seven faculty units. The programs under the former colleges were divided among the following seven faculty units:

- Arts & Letters: Communication, Media, and Culture, English, Film, Visual Arts
- Business & Government: Accounting, Business Management, Entrepreneurship, Political Science, Hospitality & Tourism Management
- Culture, Language & Performing Arts: Anthropology and Cultural Sustainability, Hawaiian Studies, History, Integrated Humanities, Intercultural Peacebuilding, Music, Pacific Island Studies, Theatre, World Languages
- Education & Social Work: English as an International Language, Social Work, Teacher Education, TESOL
- Math & Computing: Computer Science, Information Systems, Information Technology, Mathematics
- Religious Education
- Sciences: Biochemistry, Biology, Chemistry, Exercise and Sport Science, Psychology, Physical Science, Physics

== Athletics ==
BYU–Hawaii formerly competed in the National Collegiate Athletic Association (NCAA) Division II as a member of the Pacific West Conference. The "Seasiders" competed in men's and women's basketball, men's and women's cross-country, men's and women's golf, softball, men's and women's tennis, volleyball, and men's and women's soccer. Over its history, the school won two women's volleyball and eleven tennis championships (two men's and nine women's, along with one women's NCAA championship). In its early days, BYU–Hawaii also won a National Rugby Championship in 1967. Basketball and volleyball games were held in the George Q. Cannon Activities Center. The campus has several tennis courts, an outdoor swimming pool, and soccer and softball fields. Most conference home games in volleyball and women's basketball, as well as additional home games in men's basketball, were broadcast live around the world on BYUtv Sports.

On March 28, 2014, the college announced that the athletics program would be phased out over the next three years, with money spent on athletics to be used to provide educational opportunities for an additional 500 students. The transition impacted all eleven (11) intercollegiate teams, including: men's/women's basketball, men's/women's cross country, men's golf, men's/women's soccer, softball, men's/women's tennis, and women's volleyball. Athletics at BYU–Hawaii ended following the spring sports in 2017.

== Student life ==
=== LDS atmosphere ===
According to BYU–Hawaii's vision outlined by then-LDS Church president David O. McKay in 1955, the school "exists to assist individuals in their quest for perfection and eternal life and in their efforts to influence the establishment of peace internationally."

All students are required to take religion classes as part of their curriculum and to attend Sunday church meetings, either LDS or non-LDS. In addition, class schedules are arranged to allow devotionals to be held weekly for the students to attend. Students from all walks of life are encouraged to learn from and strengthen each other as they all strive to further their education. A variety of clubs and campus organizations are available to participate in.

=== Honor code ===
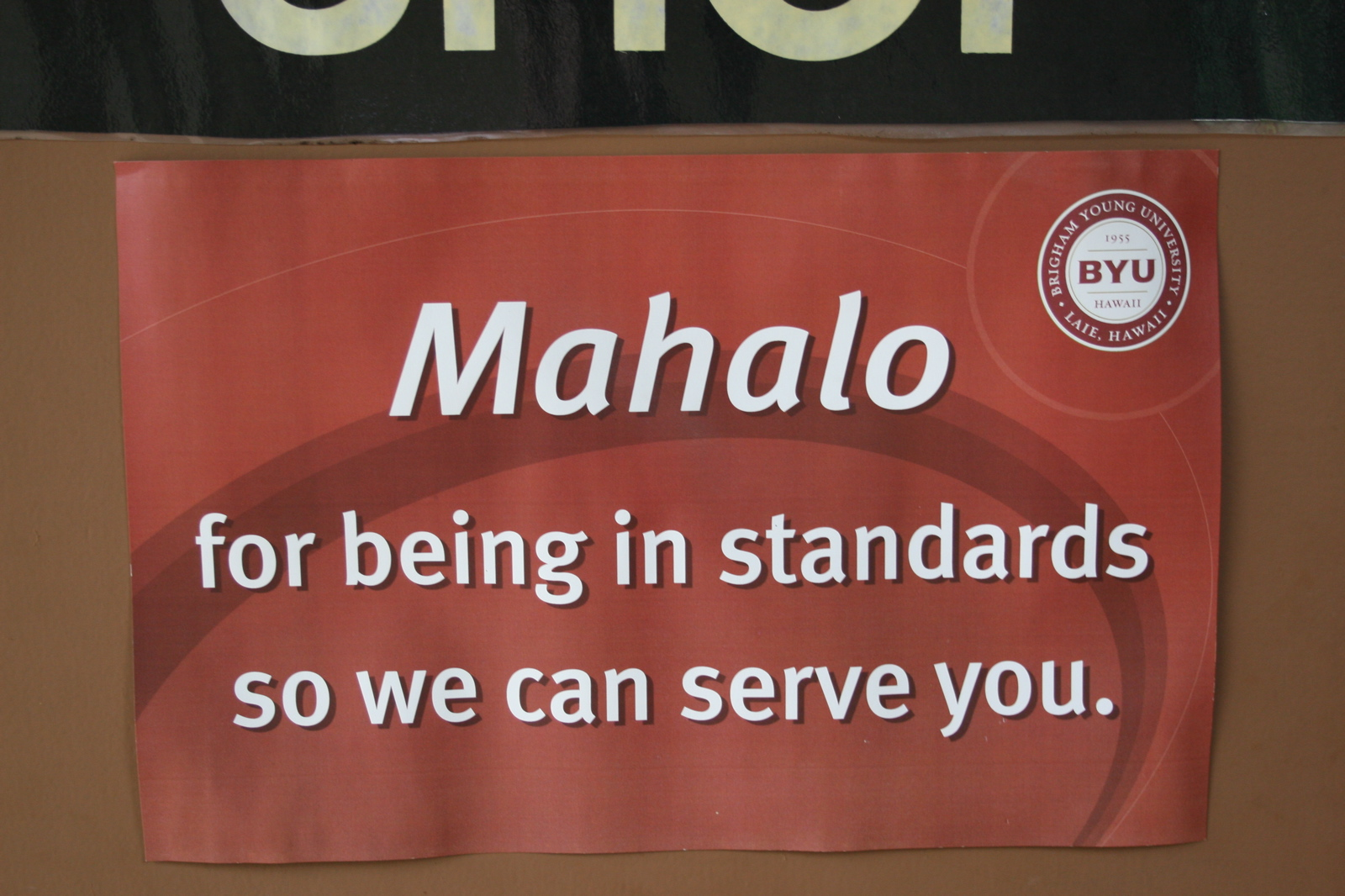
A sign reminds students of the BYU–Hawaii Honor Code standards

All students and faculty are required to agree to adhere to an honor code, officially known as the CES Honor Code, but often referred to as the BYU Honor Code. Early forms of the BYU Honor Code are found as far back as the days of the Brigham Young Academy and educator Karl G. Maeser. Maeser created the "Domestic Organization," which was a group of teachers who would visit students at their homes to see that they were following the school's moral rules prohibiting premarital sex, obscenity, profanity, smoking, and alcohol consumption.

The Honor Code itself was created in 1940 at BYU and was used mainly for cases of cheating and academic dishonesty. Ernest L. Wilkinson expanded the Honor Code in 1957 to include other school standards. (At this time, Wilkinson, as President of BYU, had some authority over BYU–Hawaii as well.) This led to the Honor Code today: rules regarding chastity, dress, grooming, and drugs (including alcohol). A signed commitment to live the honor code is part of the application process and must be adhered by all students, faculty, and staff. Students and faculty found in violation of standards are either warned or called to meet with representatives of the Honor Council. In rare cases, students and faculty can be expelled from the school or lose tenure. One significant difference between the versions of the Honor Code used at the main BYU campus and BYU–Hawaii is specific prohibition of the drinking of kava by BYU–Hawaii students and faculty. Kava is a traditional Polynesian drink with some drug-like side-effects.

== Alumni ==
Alumni of BYU–Hawaii include delegate to Congress from American Samoa Eni Faleomavaega '64, and Hawaii Rainbow Warriors volleyball coach Mike Wilton '72.
