= Polynesian Cultural Center =

Theme park and living museum in Hawaii

- Interactive map of Polynesian Cultural Center
- Location: 55-370 Kamehameha Highway, Laie, Hawaii, U.S.
- Coordinates: 21°38′20.63″N 157°55′12.97″W
- Status: Operating
- Opened: October 12, 1963
- Owner: Corporation of the President of The Church of Jesus Christ of Latter-day Saints
- Slogan: One Ohana Sharing Aloha
- Area: 42 acres (17 ha)
- Website: polynesia.com

The Polynesian Cultural Center (PCC) is a family-centered cultural tourist attraction and living museum in Laie on the northern shore of Oahu, Hawaii, United States. The PCC is owned by the Church of Jesus Christ of Latter-day Saints (LDS Church), was dedicated on October 12, 1963, and occupies 42 acres (17 hectares) of land belonging to nearby Brigham Young University–Hawaii (BYU-Hawaii).

The PCC encompasses eight simulated tropical villages where performers demonstrate various arts and crafts from throughout Polynesia. Visitors may also take a free shuttle tour of the university and see the LDS Church's Laie Hawaii Temple and its associated visitors' center.

Seventy percent of the PCC's approximately 1,300 employees are students at BYU-Hawaii. Since opening, the PCC has provided financial assistance to more than 12,000 BYU-Hawaii students. Students may work up to 20 hours per week during school terms and 40 hours during breaks. As a non-profit organization, PCC's revenue is used for daily operations and to support education.

== History ==
In early 1962, LDS Church president David O. McKay authorized the construction of the nonprofit center to provide employment and scholarships for students at BYU-Hawaii and to preserve Polynesia's culture. It has its roots in the 1940s and 1950s when hukilau and luau beach gatherings were held to earn money to rebuild a local chapel belonging to the LDS Church, which had been destroyed in a fire. "The Hukilau Song," made famous by Alfred Apaka, was written following the composer and song's original singer, Jack Owens, visit to Lāʻie's hukilau. In October 1980, Guangdong Party's first secretary, Xi Zhongxun, father of current Chinese leader Xi Jinping, visited the PCC during a tour of the United States. After the September 11 attacks, attendance suffered at the PCC. In 2004, the PCC doubled its advertising budget, "to promote local music, dance and food festivals."

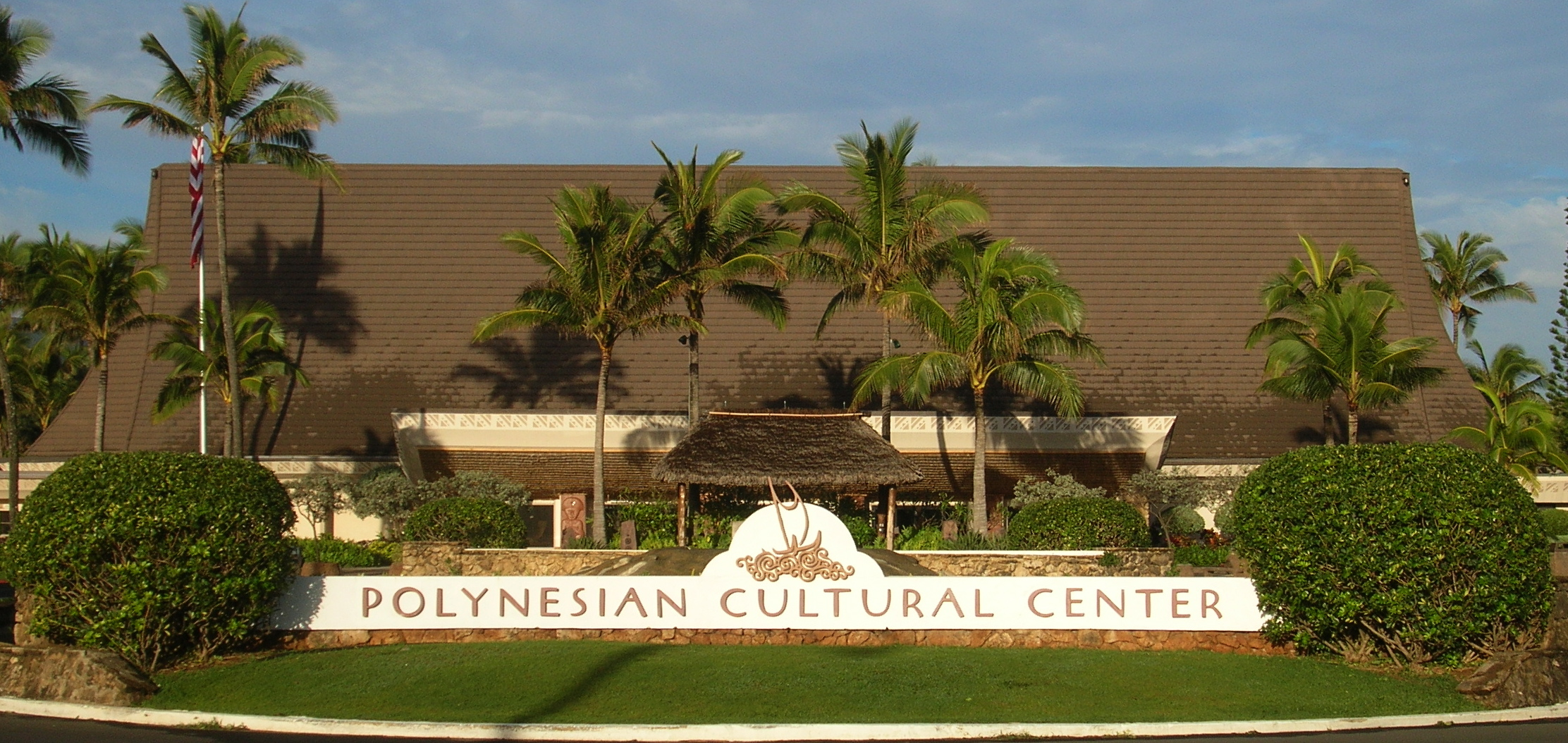
Entrance to the Polynesian Cultural Center

The PCC is one of the most frequently visited destinations for tourism in Hawaii, attracting 700,000 visitors annually. The PCC is the venue for the annual World Fire Knife Dance Competition, where contestants display their skills with blazing swords. Since its opening in 1963, over 32 million people have visited the center. Howard W. Hunter is credited with transforming the newly organized PCC from an unprofitable and unknown entity into one of Hawaii's most popular tourist attractions.

== Activities ==
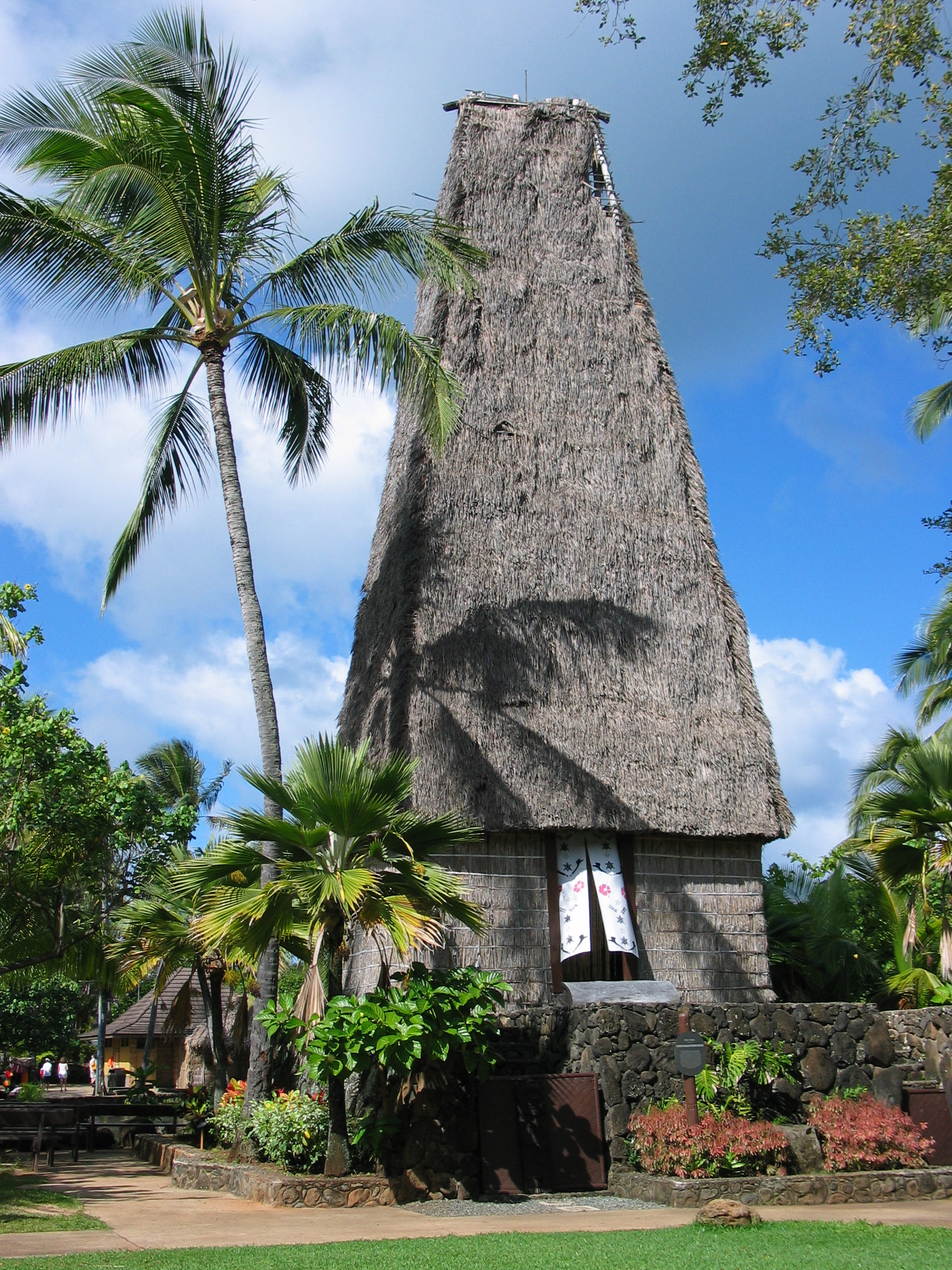
A Fiji Temple at the Polynesian Cultural Center

=== Hā–Breath of Life ===
In addition to the daytime exhibits and demonstrations, PCC features an evening show for an additional charge. As of 2009, the show is a multicultural Polynesian show titled Hā–Breath of Life, which The New York Times described as "a vivid, energetic production that highlights song and dance from the indigenous cultures of the South Pacific." The show features songs and dances throughout Polynesia, including the hula, tamure, otea, titi torea, haka, poi, meke, tauʻolunga, and Taualuga. Past shows include "This is Polynesia", "Mana: The Spirit of Our People.", and Horizons: Where the Sea Meets the Sky. The show reportedly has a cast of 100 performers, and they perform six evenings a week.

=== Huki: A Canoe Celebration ===
The Lagoon hosts a parade of canoes that showcase the signature dances of each Polynesian culture. The current show, Huki: A Canoe Celebration, which premiered in August 2018, was preceded by Rainbows of Paradise, This is Polynesia, and Ancient Legends of Polynesia.

=== Villages ===
Each major of Polynesian culture has its section centered on a traditional village. Hourly performances and cultural learning experiences take place in these villages. Villages include:

- Hawaii
- Samoa
- Aotearoa (New Zealand)
- Fiji
- Tahiti
- Tonga

In addition to the villages, the PCC has a special exhibit dedicated to Rapa Nui (Easter Island or Isla de Pascua) and a tribute to the 1850s LDS mission. Visitors may participate in a luʻau, such as the Aliʻi Luʻau ("Royal Feast"), which offers traditional Polynesian fare, including pork cooked in an imu (an underground oven). They can observe the roasted pig in the imu prior to the meal. The PCC has its own Special effect theater and a lagoon where visitors can take canoe rides accompanied by a guide or paddle by themselves.

== Special events ==
PCC hosts many special events, highlighting Hawaiian, Samoan, Tahitian, and Māori cultures and a Christmas festival. The PCC used to host a Haunted Lagoon but discontinued it in 2013 because it was not profitable. Other festivals include the Moanikeala Hula Festival, the World Fireknife Championships, and the Micronesia Betelnut Festival.

== Gallery ==
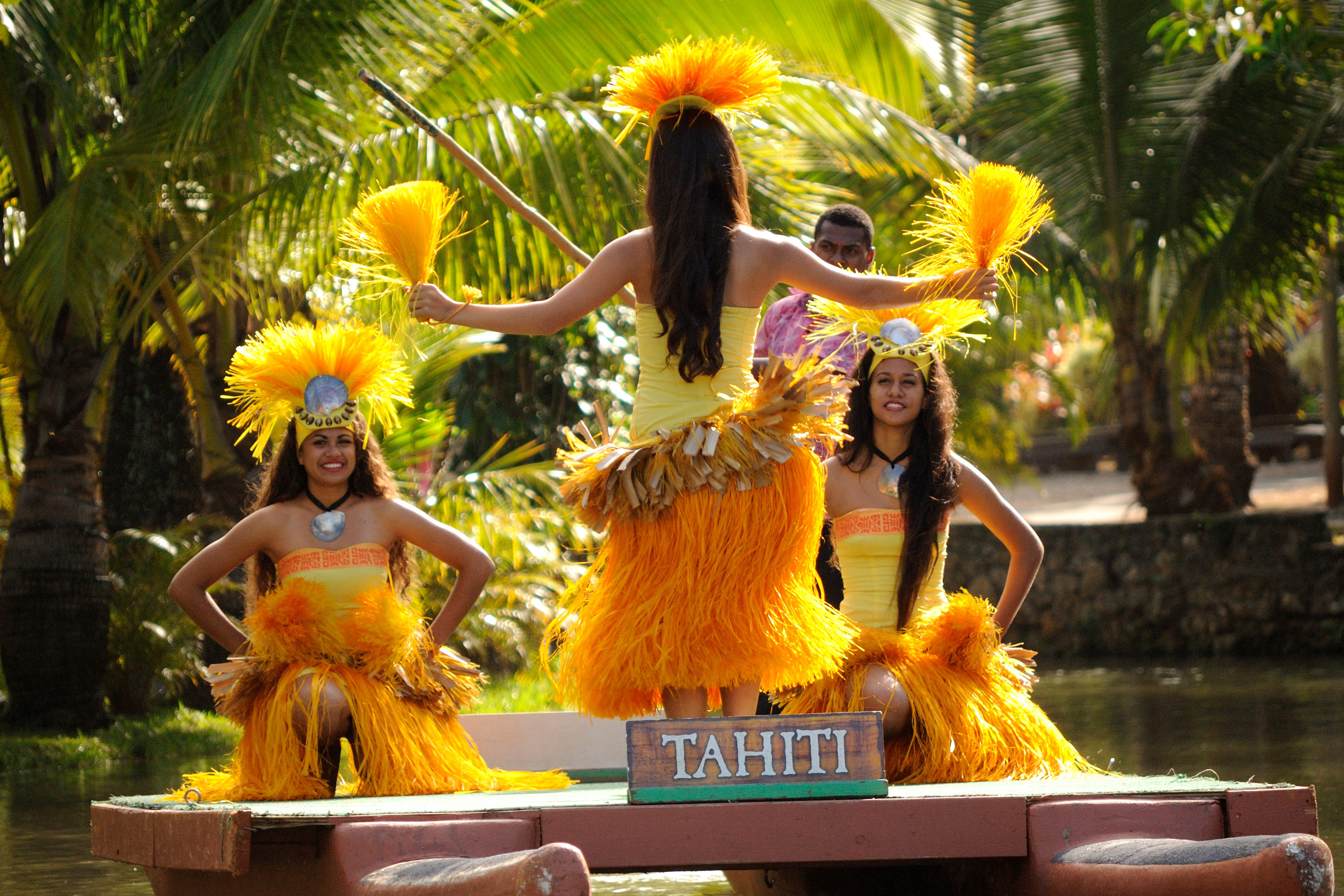
The Tahiti Village show

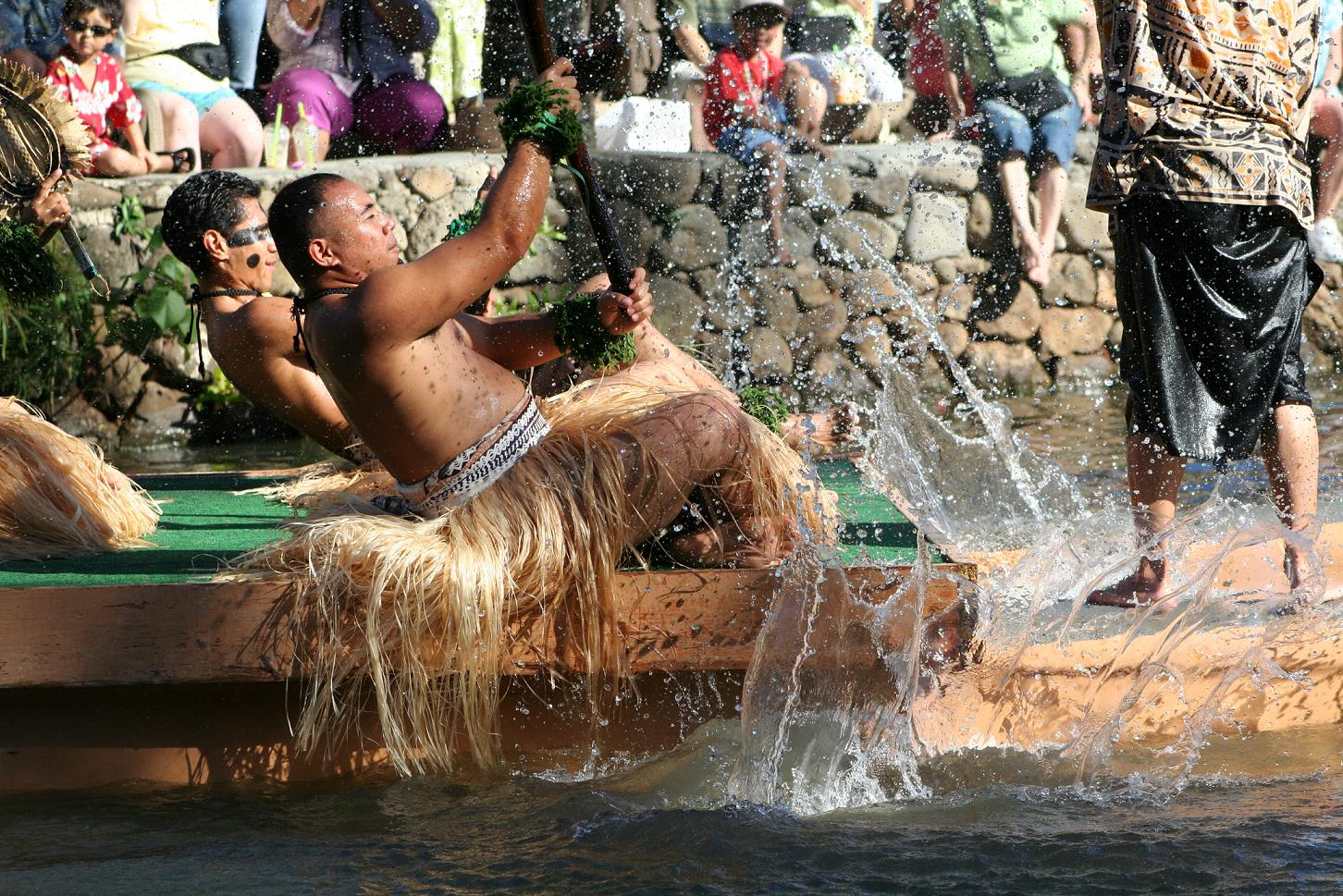
Rower in a traditional canoe at the Polynesian Cultural Center

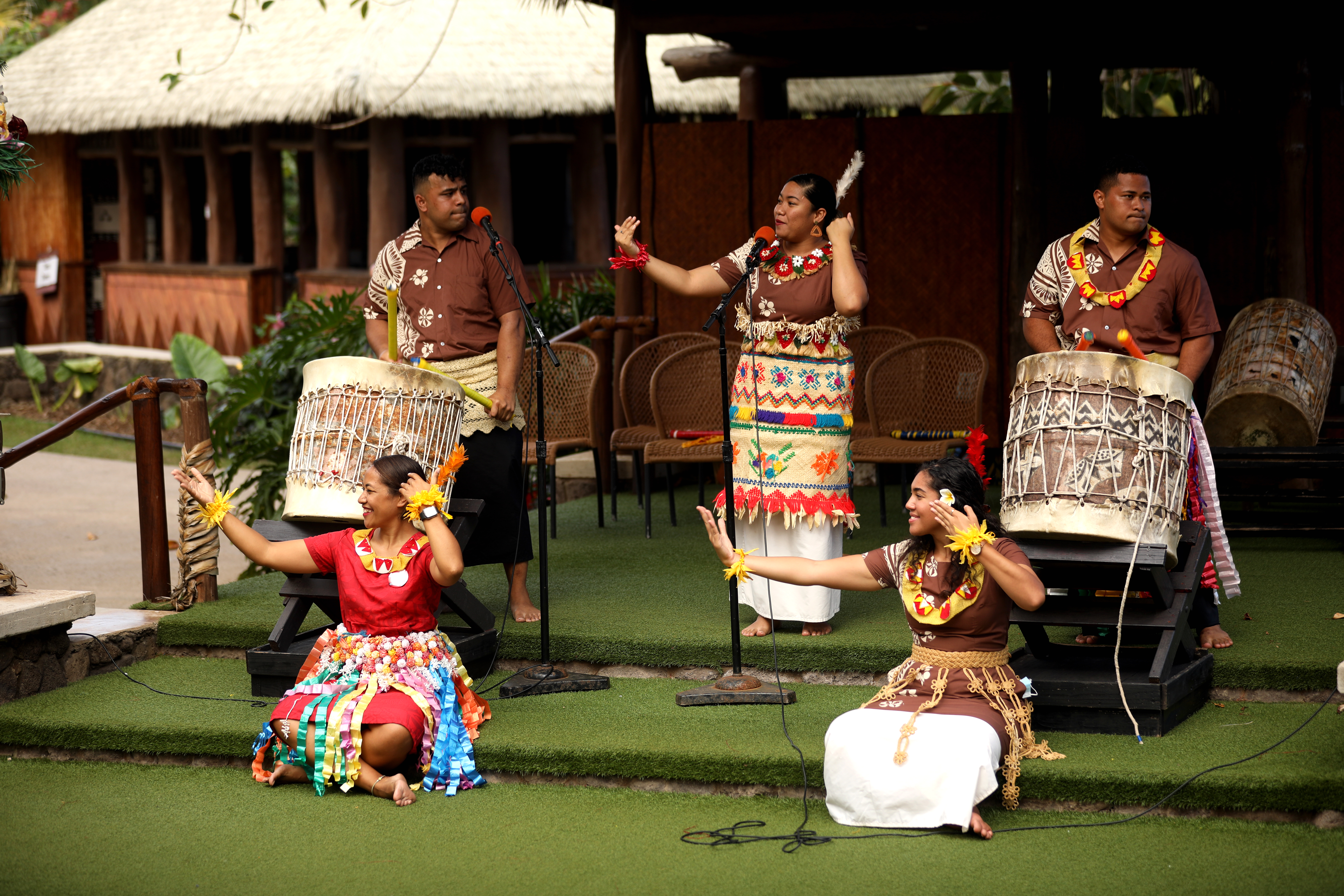
2022 photograph

== See also ==
- The Church of Jesus Christ of Latter-day Saints in Hawaii
- Human Zoo
