= The Church of Jesus Christ of Latter-day Saints in Hawaii =

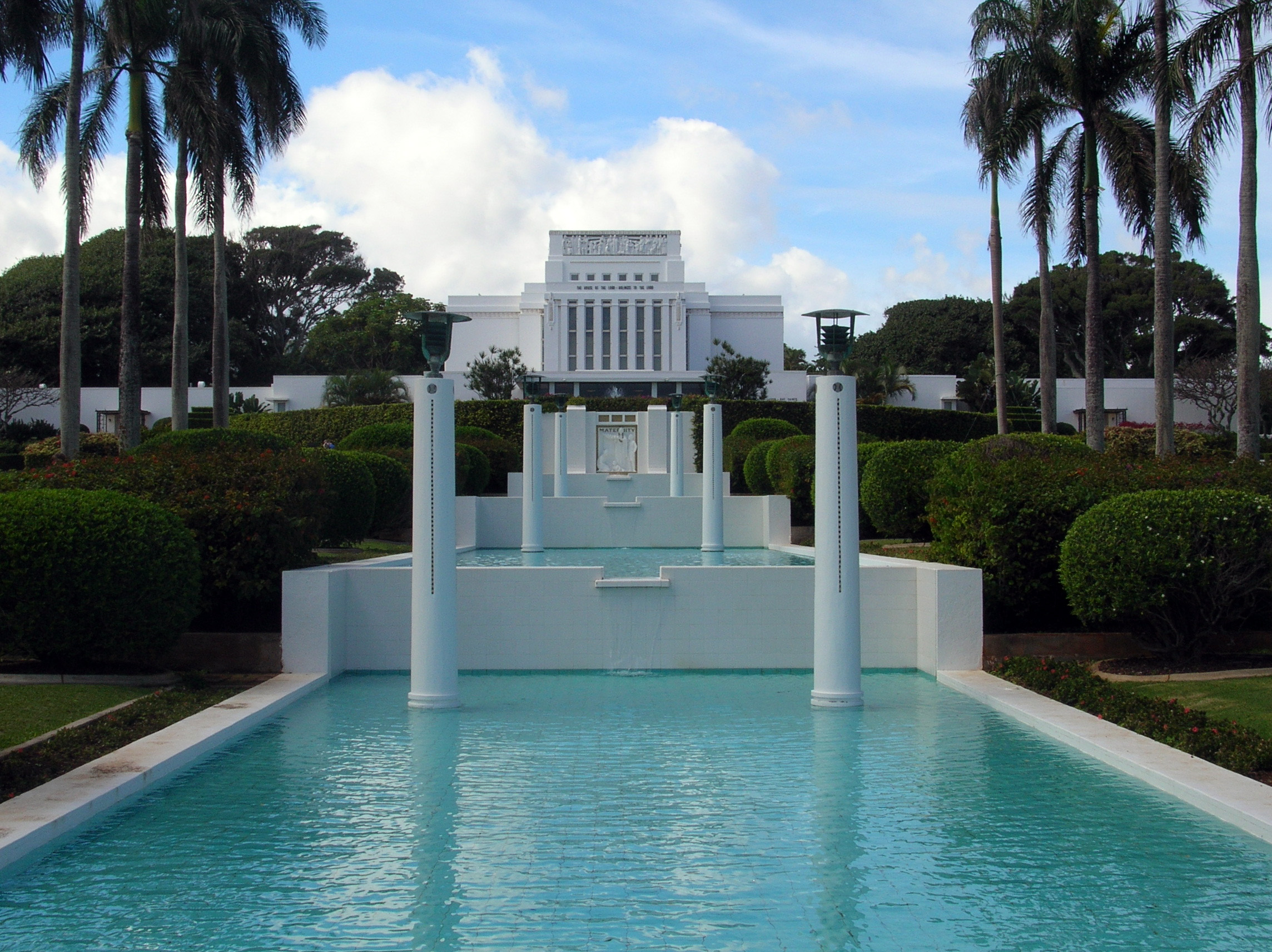
- The Laie Hawaii Temple is the oldest operating LDS temple outside of Utah.
- Area: US West
- Members: 75,827 (2025)
- Stakes: 17
- Wards: 131
- Branches: 15
- Total Congregations: 146
- Missions: 2
- Temples: 2 operating 2 announced 4 total
- FamilySearch Centers: 26

The Church of Jesus Christ of Latter-day Saints (LDS Church) was established in the Hawaiian Islands in 1850, 11 years after the Edict of Toleration was decreed by Kamehameha III, giving the underground Hawaii Catholic Church the right to worship, and at the same time allowing other faith traditions to begin establishing themselves.

The church's first missionary to have success among the Hawaiians was George Q. Cannon. Among his earliest converts were men well-versed in the Hawaiian language, such as Jonatana Napela and Uaua. After the construction of the Hawaii Temple, the Latter-day Saints founded the Church College of Hawaii, now Brigham Young University-Hawaii (BYU-Hawaii), along with the associated Polynesian Cultural Center (PCC), the state's largest living museum, and an entertainment center; which draws a million visitors annually. As the Latter-day Saint population in Hawaii continued to increase, a second church temple for the islands, the Kona Hawaii Temple, was completed in Kailua Kona on the island of Hawaii in 2000.

Hawaii has the highest concentration of Latter-day Saints of U.S. states that do not border Utah. The LDS Church is the 2nd largest denomination in Hawaii, behind the Roman Catholic Church.

== History ==
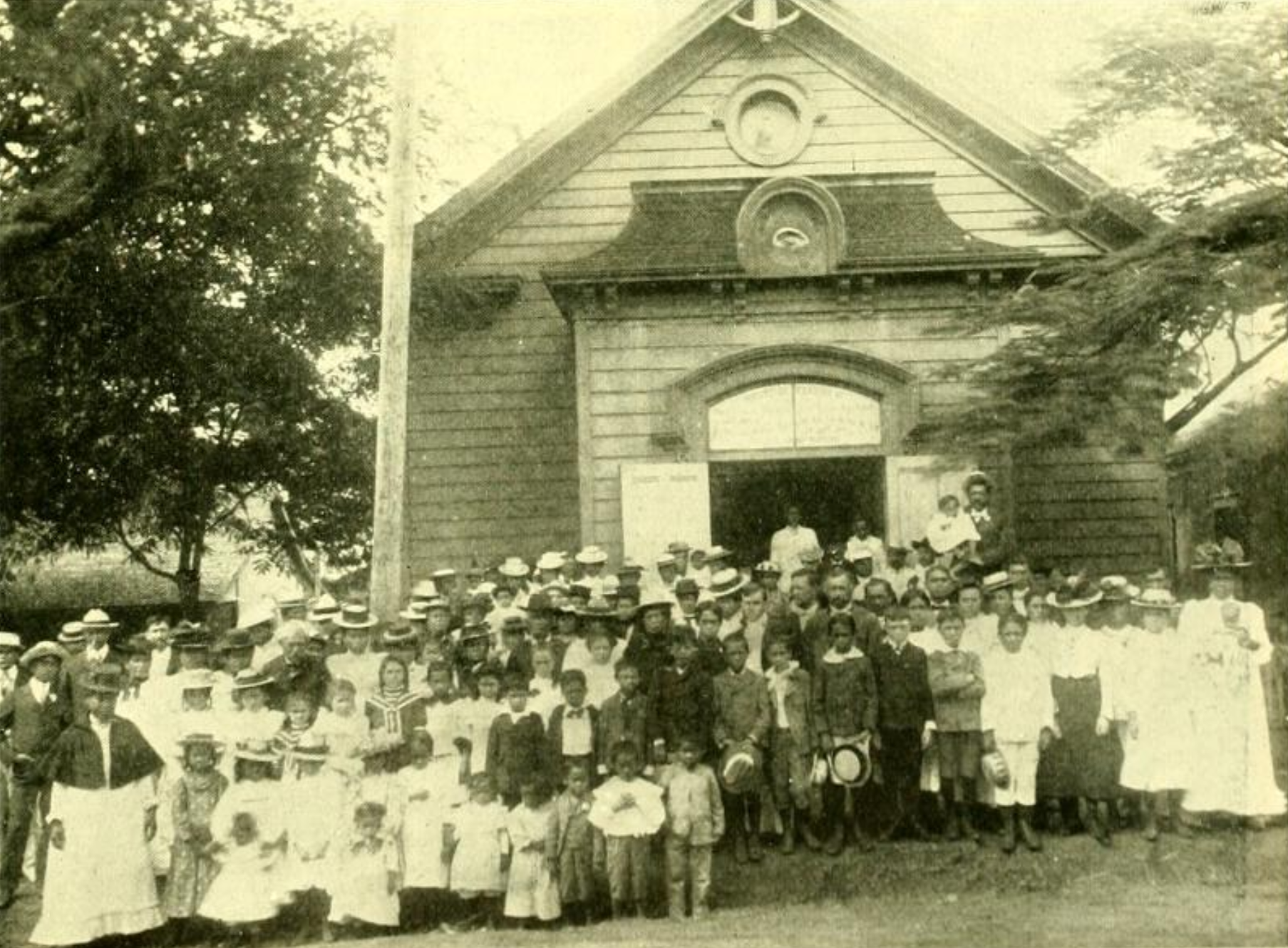
Honolulu Sunday School ca 1902

Membership in Hawaii
Year	Members
1851	220
1920	10,745
1930	14,433
1940	9,789
1950	11,855
1960	18,327
1970	23,377
1980	30,241
*1989	49,000
1999	55,361
2009	68,128
2019	75,009
2025	75,827
*Membership was published as a rounded number.

The church's first ten missionaries departed San Francisco for Hawaii during the California Gold Rush on the ship Imaum of Muscat, arriving on December 12, 1850, in Honolulu Harbor of what was then known as the Sandwich Islands. With Hiram Clark presiding, the missionaries included Henry Bigler, Hiram Blackwell, George Q. Cannon, John Dixon, William Farrer, James Hawkins, James Keeler, Thomas Morris, and Thomas Whittle. A day after their arrival the group climbed a hill above Honolulu (Pacific Heights), constructed a small, makeshift altar and said a prayer. A week later, the ten missionaries received their assignments: Farrer and Dixon headed to the island of Kauaʻi, Cannon, Keeler, and Bigler to Lahaina on the island of Maui, Blackwell and Hawkins to the Big Island of Hawaii, with Morris, Whittle, and Clark staying behind in Honolulu. This group formed the basis of the Sandwich Islands Mission. The church's first congregation in Hawaii was established on the island of Maui in 1851. Among the early converts of Cannon were three prominent native Hawaiians: Napela, Uaua and Kaleohano who would later serve as prominent missionaries and leaders in the LDS Church.

Missionaries led a group of Hawaiian Latter-day Saints in establishing a colony on the island of Lānaʻi in 1854. In 1857, the American missionaries left due to the Utah War. No new missionaries came until Walter M. Gibson arrived in 1861. Gibson instituted irregular activities such as selling the priesthood. Some local leaders, such as Napela, sent letters to Salt Lake City asking for Gibson to be replaced. In response, Ezra T. Benson and Lorenzo Snow of the church's Quorum of the Twelve Apostles were sent to take over the leadership of the mission, with the assistance of Joseph F. Smith, who had been a missionary in Hawaii for much of the 1850s. Most of the membership followed Benson, Snow, and Smith, but in the process ownership of the property on Lanai was lost. A new colony for Hawaiian Latter-day Saints was established in Lāʻie.

In 1889, Iosepa, Utah was founded as a colony for Hawaiian Latter-day Saints. This colony functioned until 1915 when the saints there were encouraged to return to Hawaii in anticipation of the building of a temple there. The first stake in Hawaii was organized in 1935.

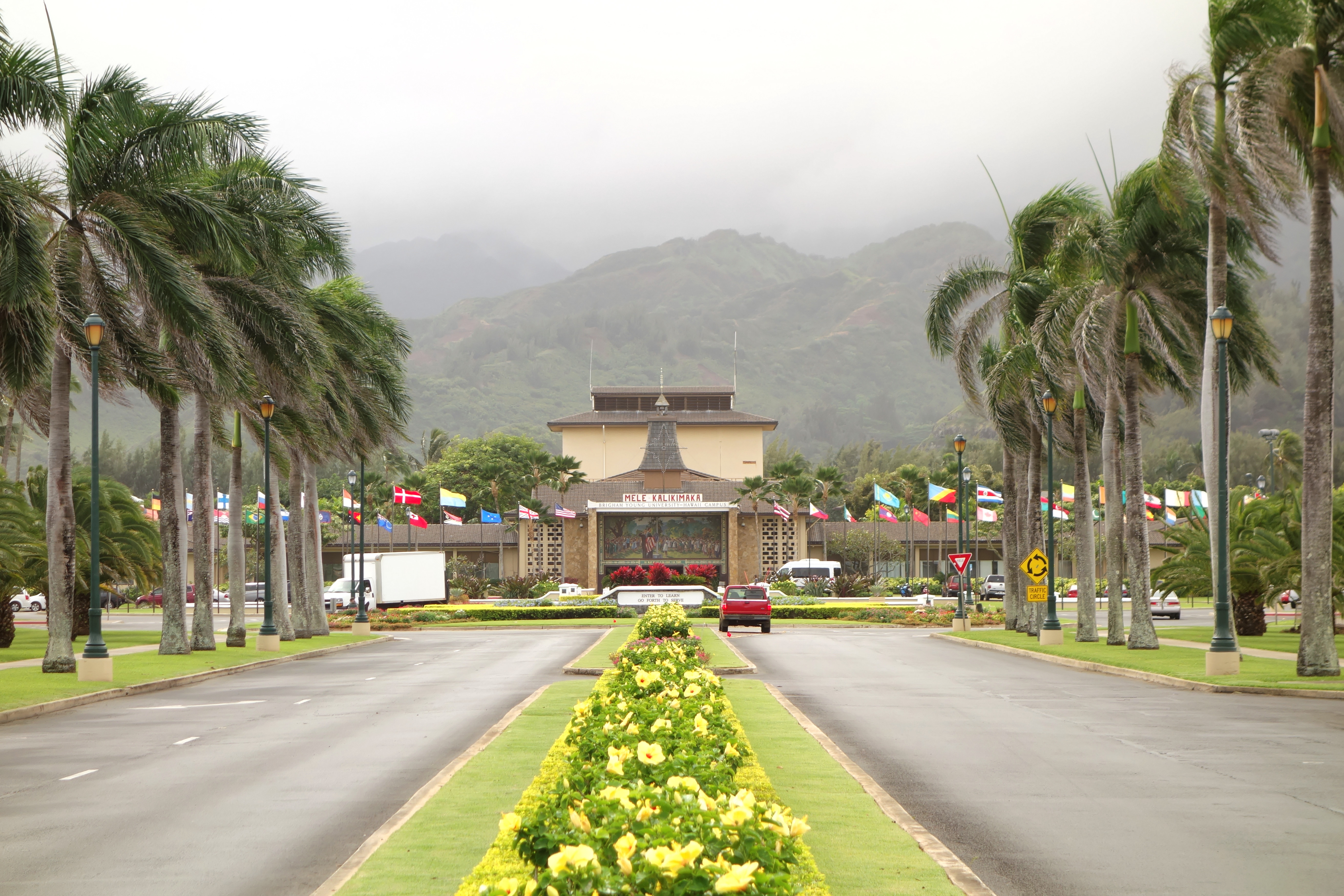
Brigham Young University–Hawaii

In 1937, the Japanese Mission was organized in Hawaii to focus on teaching the ethnic Japanese in Hawaii. This mission existed until 1950 when it was merged into the Hawaiian mission.

== County Statistics ==
List of LDS Church adherents in each county as of 2010 according to the Association of Religion Data Archives:

County	Congregations	Adherents	% of Population
Hawaii	17	10,422	5.63
Honolulu	97	48,750	5.11
Kauaʻi	6	3,488	5.20
Maui	14	7,212	4.66

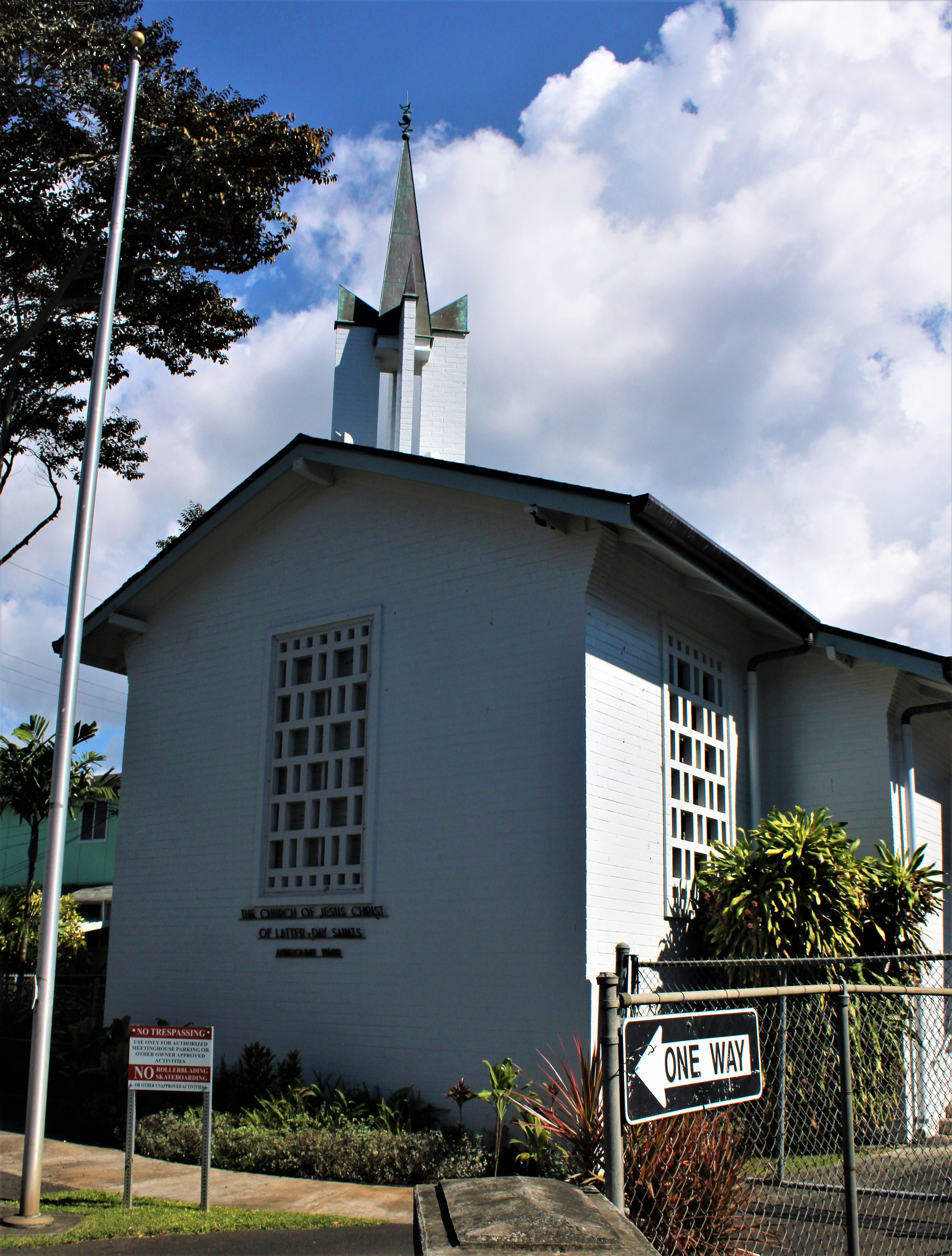
A meetinghouse on Lusitana Street in Honolulu, Hawaii.

== Stakes ==
As of July 2026, Hawaii had the following stakes:

Stake	Organized	Mission	Temple District
Hilo Hawaii	24 Oct 2004	Hawaii Honolulu	Kona Hawaii
Honolulu Hawaii	26 Aug 1955	Hawaii Honolulu	Laie Hawaii
Honolulu Hawaii West	4 Feb 1962	Hawaii Honolulu	Laie Hawaii
Kahului Hawaii	9 Nov 1975	Hawaii Honolulu	Kona Hawaii
Kahului Hawaii West	4 May 2014	Hawaii Honolulu	Kona Hawaii
Kaneohe Hawaii	21 Nov 1971	Hawaii Laie	Laie Hawaii
Kauai Hawaii	24 Jul 1977	Hawaii Honolulu	Laie Hawaii
Kona Hawaii	24 Nov 1974	Hawaii Honolulu	Kona Hawaii
Laie Hawaii Married Student	22 Nov 1981	Hawaii Laie	Laie Hawaii
Laie Hawaii North	16 Jan 1983	Hawaii Laie	Laie Hawaii
Laie Hawaii	30 Jun 1935	Hawaii Laie	Laie Hawaii
Laie Hawaii YSA 1st	23 Jan 1977	Hawaii Laie	Laie Hawaii
Laie Hawaii YSA 2nd	24 Oct 2004	Hawaii Laie	Laie Hawaii
Makakilo Hawaii	8 Dec 1996	Hawaii Honolulu	Laie Hawaii
Mililani Hawaii	20 Jan 1980	Hawaii Laie	Laie Hawaii
Puna Hawaii	9 Feb 2025	Hawaii Honolulu	Kona Hawaii
Waipahu Hawaii	20 Feb 1972	Hawaii Honolulu	Laie Hawaii

== Missions ==
Mission	Organized
Hawaii Honolulu	12 Dec 1850
Hawaii Laie	3 Jan 2022

== Temples ==
Temples in Hawaii
- = Operating
- = Under construction
- = Announced
- = Temporarily Closed

The Laie Hawaii Temple, formerly known as the Hawaiian Temple or the Hawaii Temple until a standard naming convention for LDS temples was adopted in the early 2000s, is located on the northeast shore of the island of Oʻahu. The temple sits on a small hill a half-mile from the Pacific Ocean in the town of Laie, 35 miles (56 km) from Honolulu. Along with BYU-Hawaii and the PCC, the temple plays an important role in the town of Laie, with the temple Visitors' Center attracting more than 100,000 people annually.

The Hawaii Temple was the first temple the LDS Church built outside of the continental United States. The temple is also the oldest to operate outside of Utah, and the fifth-oldest still in operation. The site of the temple was dedicated by church president Joseph F. Smith on June 1, 1915, and the completed structure was dedicated by church president Heber J. Grant on November 27, 1919.

The Kona Hawaii Temple became the church's seventieth temple, announced on May 7, 1998. Located in the town of Kailua-Kona on the island of Hawaii, the site of Kona Hawaii Temple was dedicated on March 13, 1999. The structure itself was constructed in concrete, white marble and some native materials. Architects used a simple classical design featuring a single spire. The completion and official dedication was celebrated on January 23, 2000, by church president Gordon B. Hinckley.

5. Laie Hawaii Temple; Official website; News & images	
Location: Announced: Groundbreaking: Dedicated: Rededicated: Size: Style: Notes:	Laie, Hawaii, United States; October 1, 1915 by Joseph F. Smith; June 1, 1915 by Joseph F. Smith; November 27, 1919 by Heber J. Grant; June 13, 1978 by Spencer W. Kimball; 42,100 sq ft (3,910 m^{2}) on a 11.4-acre (4.6 ha) site Solomon's Temple, no spire - designed by Hyrum Pope and Harold Burton; Thomas S. Monson rededicated the Laie Hawaii Temple on November 20, 2010 following nearly 2 years of renovations that began December 29, 2008. The remodel completed in 1978 expanded the temple from 10,500 square feet (980 m^{2}) to over 47,000 square feet (4,400 m^{2}).
70. Kona Hawaii Temple (Closed for renovation); Official website; News & images	
Location: Announced: Groundbreaking: Dedicated: Size: Style:	Kailua-Kona, Hawaii, United States; May 7, 1998 by Gordon B. Hinckley; March 13, 1999 by John B. Dickson; January 23, 2000 by Gordon B. Hinckley; 12,325 sq ft (1,145.0 m^{2}) on a 7.02-acre (2.84 ha) site Classic modern, single-spire design - designed by Church A & E Services, Bob Lowder
336. Kahului Hawaii Temple (Site announced); Official website; News & images	
Location: Announced: Size:	Kahului, Hawaii; 1 October 2023 by Russell M. Nelson; 19,000 sq ft (1,800 m^{2}) on a 7.6-acre (3.1 ha) site
349. Honolulu Hawaii Temple (Announced); Official website; News & images	
Location: Announced:	Honolulu, Hawaii, United States; 7 April 2024 by Russell M. Nelson

== See also ==
- The Church of Jesus Christ of Latter-day Saints membership statistics (United States)
- Religion in Hawaii
