= Tsune Ishida Nachie =

- Born: April 6, 1856; Tokyo, Japan
- Died: December 3, 1938 (aged 82); Laie, Hawaii, United States
- Religion: The Church of Jesus Christ of Latter-day Saints

Tsune Ishida Nachie (1856–1938) was a pioneering member of the Church of Jesus Christ of Latter-day Saints in Japan and served as a missionary in both Japan and Hawaii. In 1905 she was hired to be a cook and housekeeper for missionaries in Japan. She converted and was baptized and later became the first member of Japanese birth to attend the temple in Laie, Hawaii.

== Early life ==
Tsune Nachie was born Komasawa, near Tokyo, on April 6, 1856, to Ando Toziko and Cho Ishida She was married at age 23, but never had children. Her husband died in 1888. After 1892, she adopted her sister's daughter Ei.

== Missionary Service ==
She was a 49-year-old widow when she joined the mission home in Tokyo. She had long worked with Europeans and was a 20-year convert to the Church of England. She moved to the mission with her niece, Ei Asano, whom the missionaries assumed was her daughter. She started her employment at the mission in July 1905. Shortly after arrival, she took an interest in the teachings of the Church of Jesus Christ of Latter-day Saints. She was baptized into the Church on September 26, 1905. She taught Sunday school and organized the four other women converts into a sort of Relief Society. She served informally and formally as a missionary, teaching her friends the gospel. She advised missionaries on salaries for other servants and prepared western-style meals for homesick missionaries. The elders in the mission paid for medical exams for her eyes and presented her with a pair of gold-rimmed eyeglasses as a Christmas gift.

For the next 18 years she acted as a surrogate mother to the missionaries. When she was 70 years old, she moved to Hawaii with financial help from many former missionaries who had worked in Japan. She became the first Japanese convert to enter the temple in Laie and later served at the temple. She continued to proselyte to Japanese-speaking people living in Hawaii and insisted on living in Laie where she could perform temple work. The first Japanese branch of the church in Hawaii was formed in 1934. Tsune died on December 3, 1938, in Hawaii.
