= Honorary Mayor of Pacific Palisades =

Community role in Los Angeles, California, US

Honorary Mayor of Community of Pacific Palisades
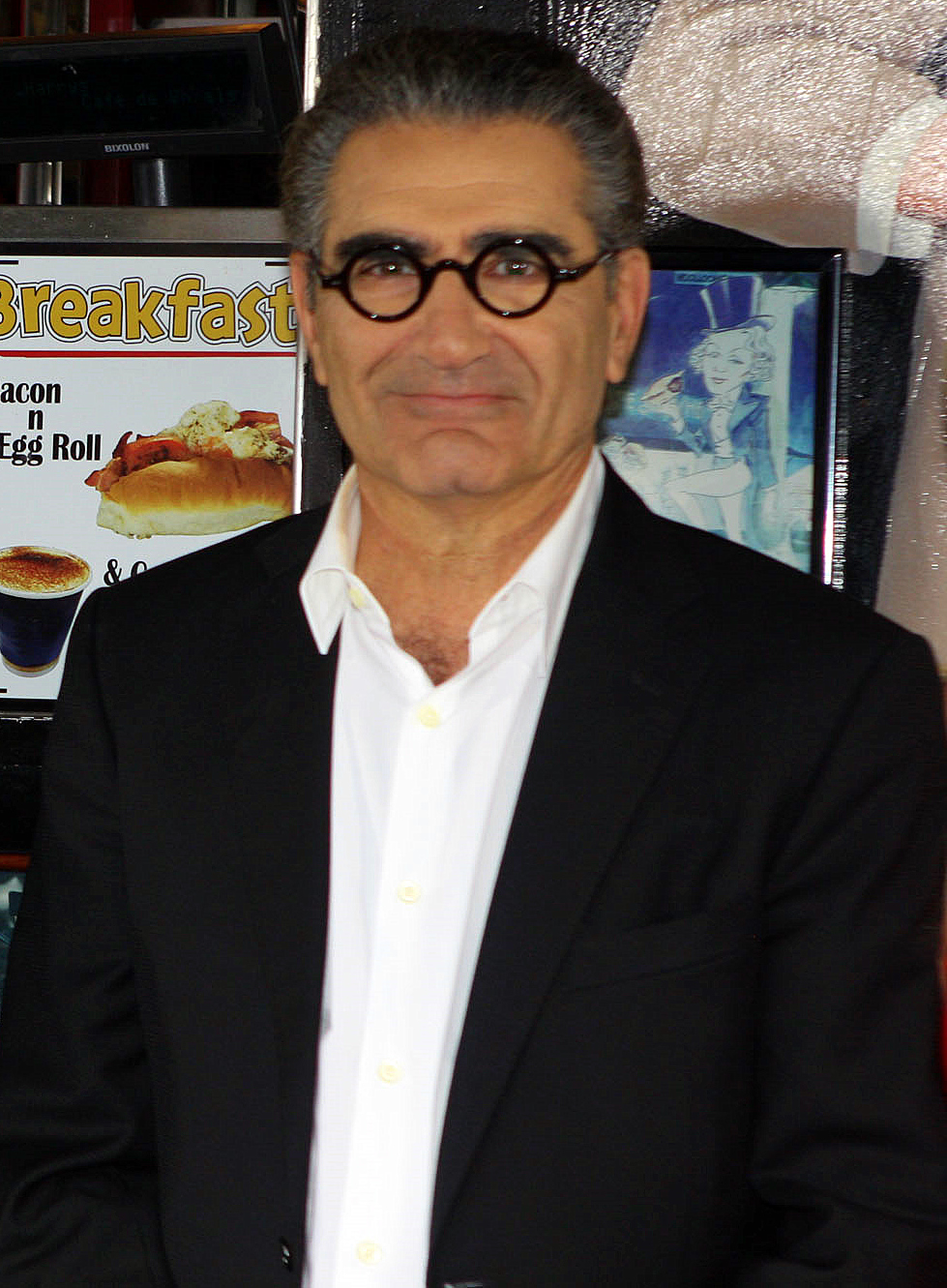
- Incumbent; Eugene Levy since January 26, 2021
- Appointer: Pacific Palisades Chamber of Commerce
- Term length: Two years (non-renewable)
- Inaugural holder: Virginia Bruce
- Formation: 1951
- Salary: $0
- Website: Office of the Honorary Mayor

The Honorary Mayor of Pacific Palisades is a position created in 1951 by members of the Pacific Palisades Chamber of Commerce. The honorary position has nonbinding political authority due to Pacific Palisades being a district within the City of Los Angeles, and is thus instead served by the Mayor of Los Angeles. The current Honorary Mayor is Canadian actor Eugene Levy serving since January 26, 2021.

== Overview ==
Pacific Palisades is a community in Los Angeles, and is politically represented by the Mayor of Los Angeles. The Honorary Mayor of Pacific Palisades is usually a celebrity and local resident who serves a term typically-lasting 2 years though some have served longer. The Honorary Mayor makes nonbinding decisions for the community, and is a figurehead who appears at town events such as menorah lighting and the annual "Palisades Rocks The Fourth!" event.

== History ==
=== 2020–present ===
Canadian actor and comedian Eugene Levy was selected by Palisades Chamber of Commerce Chairwoman Sarah Knauer and President & CEO Bob Benton on September 21, 2020. Levy is a longtime resident of the area, and lives in the Alphabet Streets neighborhood of Pacific Palisades. Levy also resides in Canada part of the year, and will only serve as honorary mayor when he is in the area.

Due to the COVID-19 pandemic, Levy was the first honorary mayor of the Palisades to be inaugurated virtually, rather than with a one person inauguration ceremony as has been the custom in the past. Levy was inaugurated as honorary mayor during a two-hour Zoom session featuring local residents and members of the Pacific Palisades Chamber of Commerce, which nominates each honorary mayor. The virtual ceremony also featured former honorary mayors Martin Short and Janice and Billy Crystal.

== List of honorary mayors ==
- Virginia Bruce (1951–1953)
- Jerry Lewis (1953–1955)
- Jack Owens (1955–1957)
- Vivian Vance (1957–1959)
- Mel Blanc (1959–1961)
- Doug McClure (1961–1963)
- Bob Rockwell (1963–1965)
- Jerry Paris (1965–1967)
- Nanette Fabray (1967–1969)
- Peter Graves (1969–1971)
- Bob Abernethy (1971–1973)
- Edward Andrews (1973–1975)
- Adam West (1975–1977)
- Walter Matthau (1977–1979)
- Bert Convy (1979–1981)
- Ted Knight (1981–1984)
- Dom Deluise (1984–1986)
- Chevy Chase (1986–1988)
- Rita Moreno (1988–1990)
- John Raitt (1990–1995)
- Bob Saget (1995–1997)
- Eddie Albert (1997–1998)
- Martin Short (1998–2000)
- Anthony Hopkins (2000–2002)
- Steve Guttenberg (2002–2006)
- Gavin MacLeod (2006–2011)
- Sugar Ray Leonard (2011–2014)
- Jake Steinfeld (2014–2016)
- Kevin Nealon (2016–2017)
- Billy and Janice Crystal* (2018–2021)
- Eugene Levy (2021–present)

== See also ==
- List of people from Pacific Palisades
- Mayor of Hollywood (honorary)
