= Kona Hawaii Temple =

Temple of The Church of Jesus Christ of Latter-day Saints

- Closed for renovation
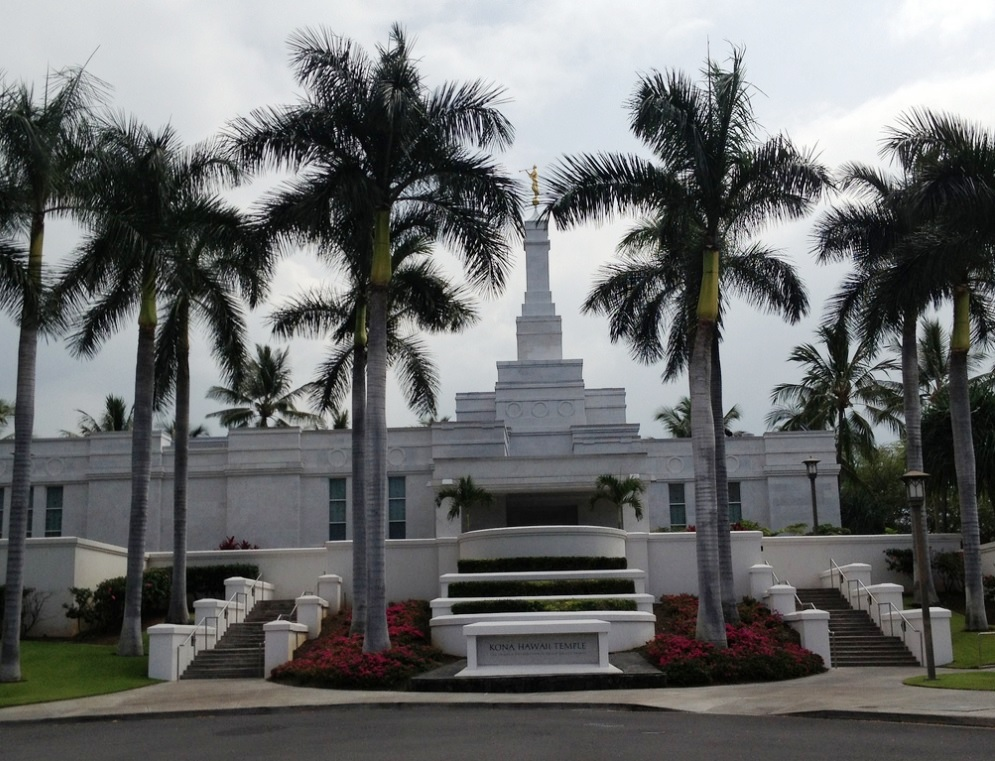
- Interactive map of Kona Hawaii Temple
- Number: 70
- Dedication: January 23, 2000, by Gordon B. Hinckley
- Site: 7.02 acres (2.84 ha)
- Floor area: 12,325 ft^{2} (1,145.0 m^{2})
- Height: 71 ft (22 m)
- Official website • News & images

Church chronology
← St. Paul Minnesota Temple	Kona Hawaii Temple	→ Ciudad Juárez Mexico Temple

Additional information
- Announced: May 7, 1998, by Gordon B. Hinckley
- Groundbreaking: March 13, 1999, by John B. Dickson
- Open house: January 12–15, 2000
- Current president: Edward Lincoln Reinhardt
- Designed by: Church A & E Services, Bob Lowder
- Location: Kailua-Kona, Hawaii, United States
- Coordinates: 19°38′29.8″N 155°59′7.9″W
- Exterior finish: White marble veneer
- Design: Classic modern, single-spire design
- Baptistries: 1
- Ordinance rooms: 2 (two-stage progressive)
- Sealing rooms: 2

The Kona Hawaii Temple is the 70th operating temple of the Church of Jesus Christ of Latter-day Saints (LDS Church). The intent to build the temple was announced on May 7, 1998, by the church's First Presidency. It is located in Kailua-Kona on the island of Hawaii and is the second temple built in Hawaii, along with the Laie Hawaii Temple, and is the sixth in the Pacific Islands.

The temple has a single attached spire. This temple was designed by church architect Emil B. Fetzer, using a modern architectural style. A groundbreaking ceremony, to signify the beginning of construction, was held on March 13, 1999, conducted by John B. Dickson of the Seventy.

== History ==
The Kona Hawaii Temple was announced May 7, 1998, with a groundbreaking ceremony presided over by John B. Dickson of the Seventy then held on March 13, 1999. Approximately 1,200 people attended the groundbreaking ceremonies. Dickson, Donald L. Hallstrom, an area seventy, Hilo stake president John Sakamaki, and Kona stake president Philip A. Harris each spoke at the ceremony. Dickson turned over the first shovelful of dirt, after which other onlookers, including many children, participated.

After construction was completed, a public open house was held from January 12–15, 2000. LDS Church president Gordon B. Hinckley dedicated the temple on January 23–24, 2000. Hinckley was accompanied to the dedication by Boyd K. Packer, Acting President of the Quorum of the Twelve Apostles, and Hallstrom. More than 3,800 church members attended the dedicatory sessions.

In 2020, like all the church's others, the Kona Hawaii Temple was closed for a time in response to the COVID-19 pandemic.

On August 29, 2022, the First Presidency announced that the temple would close for renovations. It closed in October 2023, with renovations expected to be completed by late 2025. The renovations will expand the temple from 9,500 square feet to 12,000 square feet.

The temple dedication was considered the first event in a yearlong commemoration of the sesquicentennial of the church in Hawaii.

Steve Young, a member of the National Football League's Hall of Fame and his wife, Barbara Graham, were married in the Kona Hawaii Temple on March 15, 2000.

In October 2023, the temple was closed for renovation, including a 2,500 square feet (230 m^{2}) expansion. The renovations were originally anticipated and announced to be completed in "late 2025." As of August 2025, the temple is currently anticipated to be finished in late 2026 or early 2027.

== Design and architecture ==
The temple is on a 7-acre site, with views of the ocean and Mount Hualalai. The building has a modern architectural style and uses traditional Latter-day Saint temple design. Designed by Emil B. Fetzer, its architecture reflects both the cultural heritage of Kona and its spiritual significance to the church.

The majority of the building was constructed with cast stone containing white marble chips; while there is no noticeable visible difference, the tower was built with fiberglass to make it lighter. The temple has two ordinance rooms, two sealing rooms, and a baptistry, each designed for ceremonial use.

The design uses elements representing Latter-day Saint symbolism to provide deeper spiritual meaning to its appearance and function. Symbolism is important to church members and includes the statue of the angel Moroni on top of the temple's steeple, which symbolizes “the restoration of the gospel of Jesus Christ.”

== Temple presidents ==
The church's temples are directed by a temple president and matron, each serving for a term of three years. The president and matron oversee the administration of temple operations and provide guidance and training for both temple patrons and staff.

Serving from 2000 to 2002, the first president was Larry R. Oler, with Midge J. Oler serving as matron. As of 2025, the temple's president and matron are Edward Lincoln Reinhardt and Gail Tsurue Minami Reinhardt.

== Admittance ==
Following completion of construction, the church announced the public open house that was held from January 12–15, 2000 (excluding Sundays). The temple was dedicated by Gordon B. Hinckley on January 23 and 24, 2000, in four sessions.

Like all the church's temples, it is not used for Sunday worship services. To members of the church, temples are regarded as sacred houses of the Lord. Once dedicated, only church members with a current temple recommend can enter for worship. The Kona Hawaii Temple is currently closed for renovations.

== See also ==
Temples in Hawaii
- = Operating
- = Under construction
- = Announced
- = Temporarily Closed

- Comparison of temples of The Church of Jesus Christ of Latter-day Saints
- List of temples of The Church of Jesus Christ of Latter-day Saints
- List of temples of The Church of Jesus Christ of Latter-day Saints by geographic region
- Temple architecture (Latter-day Saints)
- The Church of Jesus Christ of Latter-day Saints in Hawaii

== Additional reading ==
- Dockstader, Julie (January 29, 2000), "Second sacred edifice in Hawaiian Islands", Church News
- Dockstader, Julie (February 26, 2000), "Legacy of faith is his gift to posterity", Church News
- Heaps, Julie Dockstader (October 21, 2006), "Members rally after quake strikes islands", Church News
- "Plans announced for renovation of Hawaii temple", Church News, October 4, 2008
