= List of people from Pacific Palisades =

This is a list of notable people who live or have lived in Pacific Palisades, Los Angeles.

== A ==
- J. J. Abrams – director, screenwriter and creator of Alias and Lost (graduate of Palisades Charter High School)
- Ben Affleck – actor and director
- Eddie Albert – actor, past honorary mayor
- Judd Apatow – director, and wife Leslie Mann
- James Arness – actor known as Marshal Matt Dillon on CBS' Gunsmoke
- Lionel Atwill – actor
- Berton Averre – guitarist and composer
- Dan Aykroyd - actor

== B ==
- James Robert Baker – writer (died by suicide in his Pacific Palisades home in 1997)
- Ronald Barak (born 1943) – Olympic gymnast
- Christophe Beck – film/TV composer
- Mel Blanc – voice actor, past honorary mayor
- Richard Boone – actor (Have Gun - Will Travel)
- Kobe Bryant – NBA player
- Francis X. Bushman – silent film star

== C ==
- Chris Carter – writer, director, producer (The X-Files)
- Chevy Chase – actor, comedian, past honorary mayor
- Tommy Chong – actor, comedian (one half of the comedy duo Cheech & Chong)
- Martin Cohan – television writer and producer, creator of Who's the Boss?
- Stephen Collins – actor, 7th Heaven
- Bill Cosby – actor
- Bert Convy – actor, game show host, past honorary mayor
- Yvonne Craig – actress
- Denise Crosby – actress
- Billy Crystal – actor and comedian, former co-honorary mayor, along with his wife, Janice
- Jamie Lee Curtis – actress

== D ==
- Matt Damon – actor
- Larry David – Seinfeld co-creator and star-creator of Curb Your Enthusiasm
- Geena Davis – actress, producer, activist
- Patti Davis – actress, daughter of Nancy and Ronald Reagan; describes growing up in the Palisades in her memoirs, including The Long Goodbye
- Dom DeLuise – actor, past honorary mayor
- Vlade Divac – NBA player
- Donna Dixon – actress, and husband Dan Aykroyd
- Dr. Dre – rapper

== E ==
- Charles and Ray Eames
- Alden Ehrenreich – actor
- Thelma "Tiby" Eisen (1922-2014) – baseball player
- Max Emerson and partner Andrés Camilo
- Judith Exner, socialite who had affairs with President John F. Kennedy and mafia boss Sam Giancana.

== F ==
- Nanette Fabray – actress, singer, past honorary mayor
- Lion Feuchtwanger – German writer
- Spencer Freedman (born 1998) – college basketball player for the Harvard Crimson and NYU Violets
- Buckminster Fuller – inventor (lived in Pacific Palisades until his death in 1983 at age 87)

== G ==
- Jennifer Garner – actress
- John Goodman – actor
- Howard Gordon - television producer and writer
- Peter Graves – actor, past honorary mayor
- Brad Grey – producer and CEO of Paramount Pictures
- Christopher Guest – actor and director
- Steve Guttenberg – actor, past honorary mayor

== H ==
- Brad Hall – actor
- Johnny Hallyday – singer
- Tom Hanks – actor
- Goldie Hawn – actress
- Joseph Morgan Henninger – artist and illustrator
- Jennifer Love Hewitt – actress, television producer and director, singer/songwriter and author
- Arthur Hill – actor
- Emile Hirsch – actor
- Oskar Homolka – actor
- Anthony Hopkins – actor, past honorary mayor
- Max Horkheimer – German philosopher of critical theory and the Frankfurt school
- Kate Hudson – actress

== I ==
- Nick Itkin (born 1999) – Olympic fencer, junior world champion

== J ==
- Sylvia Juncosa – guitarist

== K ==
- Karen Kane – fashion designer
- Stephen Kanner – modernist architect and co-founder of the A+D Museum
- Diane Keaton – actress
- Konrad Kellen – intelligence analyst and author
- Nicole Kidman – actress
- Ted Knight – actor, past honorary mayor
- Brianna Kupfer – university student and murder victim

== L ==
- Lorenzo Lamas – actor, martial artist and reality show participant
- Carole Landis – actress
- Joe Lando – actor
- Matt LeBlanc – actor most known for appearing as Joey Tribbiani on Friends
- Sugar Ray Leonard – boxer, former honorary mayor
- Eugene Levy – actor, comedian, current honorary mayor
- Jerry Lewis – comedian, actor, director, and past honorary mayor
- Shelley Long – actress
- Julia Louis-Dreyfus – actress
- Mike Love – band member of Beach Boys

== M ==
- Gavin MacLeod – actor, past honorary mayor
- Leslie Mann – actress, and husband Judd Apatow
- Thomas Mann – Nobel Prize-winning German novelist
- Walter Matthau – actor, past honorary mayor
- John Mayer – singer
- Doug McClure – actor, past honorary mayor
- Ted McGinley – actor
- Patrick McGoohan – actor
- Nancy Meyers – director, writer, producer
- Henry Miller – author
- Poppy Montgomery – actress
- Rita Moreno – singer, dancer and multiple award-winning actress, past honorary mayor
- Jon Moscot – American-Israeli MLB pitcher (Cincinnati Reds)
- Randy Newman – musician, singer-songwriter, and film composer
- Ron Mael – musician, songwriter
- Russell Mael - singer, musician

== N ==
- Stevie Nicks – singer

== O ==
- Conan O'Brien – talk show host, moved to Pacific Palisades in 2012
- Chris O'Donnell – actor
- Amy O'Neill – former actress
- Paul N.J. Ottosson – three-time Oscar-winning sound designer
- Jack Owens – singer-songwriter of the 1940s, honorary mayor of Pacific Palisades in 1955

== P ==
- Brad Paisley – country singer
- Alexandra Paul – actress and activist
- Mark Payne – multiple Emmy winning make-up artist, filmmaker and author
- Matthew Perry – actor
- Sydney Pollack – director, actor and producer
- Pat Conway - actor

== Q ==
- Anthony Quinn – actor

== R ==
- John Raitt – actor, father of singer Bonnie Raitt
- Ronald Reagan – 40th President of the United States, governor and actor
- JJ Redick – NBA Player and Coach
- Matthew Rhodes – film producer
- Joan Rivers – comedian (owned a home here as well as in New York)
- Karl L. Rundberg (1899–1969) – Los Angeles City Council member
- Kurt Russell – actor

== S ==
- Bob Saget – actor, comedian, past honorary mayor
- Sabrina Scharf – actress and anti-pollution activist; wife of Bob Schiller
- Bob Schiller – television writer
- Geoff Schwartz – NFL football player
- Mitchell Schwartz – NFL football player
- Arnold Schwarzenegger – actor and former governor of California
- Vin Scully – baseball announcer (Los Angeles Dodgers)
- Tom Segura – comedian
- Derek Shearer – professor at Occidental College and former United States Ambassador to Finland
- David Shore – Canadian television writer
- Martin Short and actress-wife Nancy Dolman (Soap) – lived in Pacific Palisades, past honorary mayor
- Maria Shriver – television journalist
- Sam Simon – writer, producer
- Alan Smolinisky – entrepreneur, real estate investor, owner of the Los Angeles Dodgers and the Palisadian-Post newspaper
- Evan Spiegel – co-founder and CEO of the American multinational technology and social media company Snap Inc.
- Steven Spielberg – director, producer
- Jill St. John – actress
- Kent Steffes – USA Volleyball Hall of Famer
- Robert Stoller – psychiatrist and author
- Hilary Swank – actress

== T ==
- Thelma Todd – actress, found dead in her car in 1935 at Palisades home, above Roadside Cafe she operated on Pacific Coast Highway
- William J. Tuttle – Hollywood makeup artist

== V ==
- Vivian Vance – actress, past honorary mayor

== W ==
- Robert Wagner – actor
- Michael Waltman – actor
- Adam West – actor, past honorary mayor
- James Whale – director of horror films such as Frankenstein
- Matty Whitmore – contestant on reality TV show Survivor: Gabon
- Kimberly Williams – actress
- Dennis Wilson – Beach Boys band member
- Rita Wilson – actor
- James Worthy – basketball player and TV commentator

== Z ==
- Gregg Zuckerman – mathematician, Yale University
