= Laie Hawaii Temple =

LDS Church temple on the Hawaiian island of Oʻahu

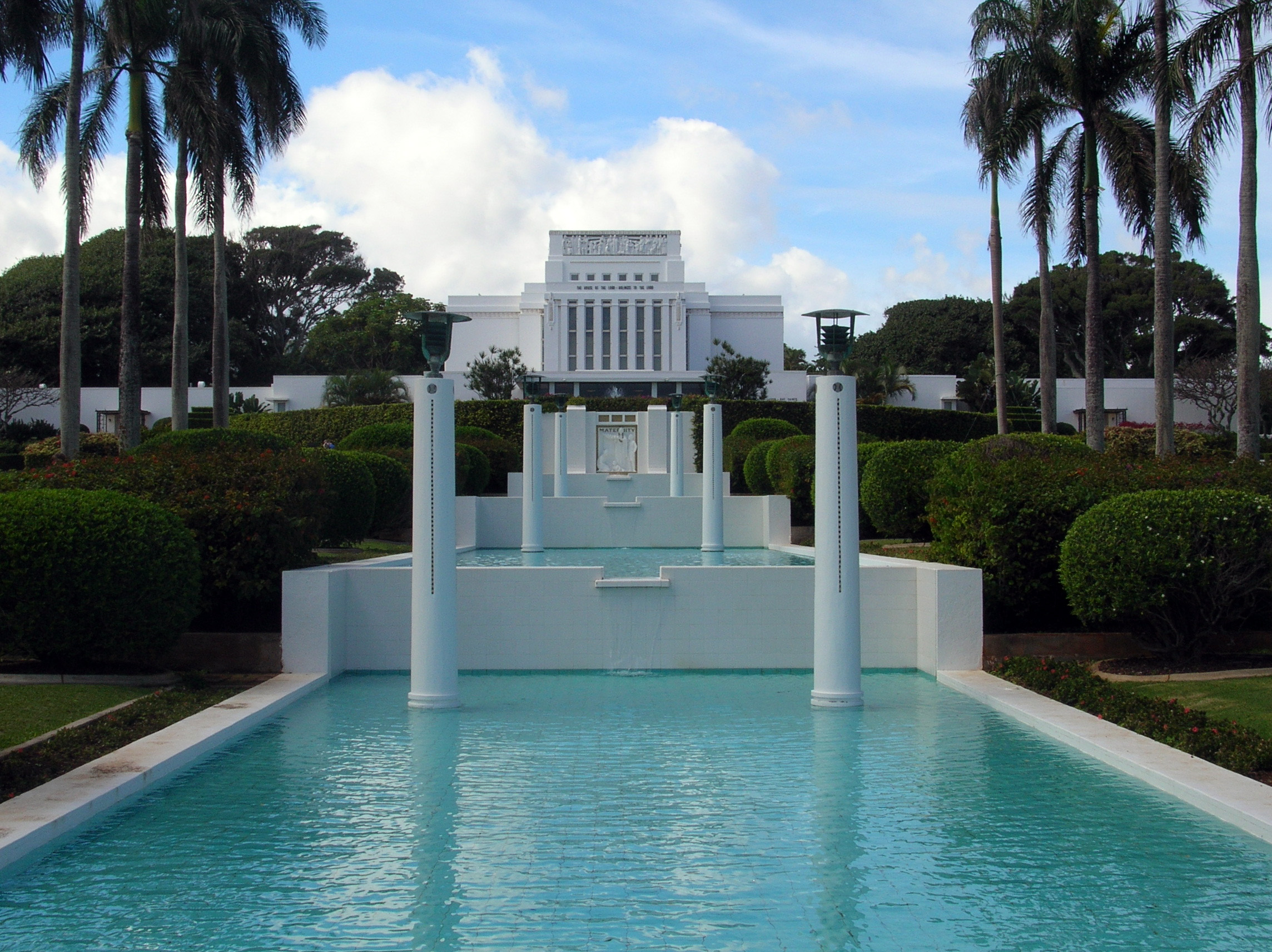
- Interactive map of Laie Hawaii Temple
- Number: 5
- Dedication: November 27, 1919, by Heber J. Grant
- Site: 11.4 acres (4.6 ha)
- Floor area: 42,100 ft^{2} (3,910 m^{2})
- Official website • News & images

Church chronology
← Salt Lake Temple	Laie Hawaii Temple	→ Cardston Alberta Temple

Additional information
- Announced: October 1, 1915, by Joseph F. Smith
- Groundbreaking: June 1, 1915, by Joseph F. Smith
- Open house: May 2–27, 1978; October 22 – November 13, 2010
- Rededicated: June 13, 1978, by Spencer W. Kimball; November 21, 2010, by Thomas S. Monson
- Designed by: Hyrum Pope and Harold Burton
- Location: Laie, Hawaii, United States
- Coordinates: 21°38′49.6″N 157°55′50.1″W
- Exterior finish: Concrete from native lava rock and coral
- Design: Solomon's Temple, no spire
- Baptistries: 1
- Ordinance rooms: 4 (four-stage progressive)
- Sealing rooms: 6
- Clothing rental: Available
- Visitors' center: Yes
- Notes: Thomas S. Monson rededicated the Laie Hawaii Temple on November 20, 2010 following nearly 2 years of renovations that began December 29, 2008. The remodel completed in 1978 expanded the temple from 10,500 square feet (980 m^{2}) to over 47,000 square feet (4,400 m^{2}).

Laie Hawaii Temple is a temple of the Church of Jesus Christ of Latter-day Saints located on the northeast shore of the Hawaiian island of Oʻahu. The temple sits on a small hill, half a mile from the Pacific Ocean, in the town of Lāʻie, 35 miles (56 km) from Honolulu. Along with Brigham Young University–Hawaii and the Polynesian Cultural Center, the Laie Hawaii Temple plays an important role in the town of Lāʻie, with the Visitors' Center attracting more than 100,000 people annually.

In addition to initial building and construction, the temple has been dedicated for use by several church presidents. The temple site was dedicated by Joseph F. Smith on June 1, 1915, with Heber J. Grant dedicating the completed structure on November 27, 1919. Spencer W. Kimball rededicated the temple after significant expansion on June 13, 1978. Following seismic upgrades and remodeling, Thomas S. Monson rededicated the temple on November 21, 2010.

The Laie Hawaii Temple was the first temple built by the church outside the contiguous United States. The temple is also the oldest to operate outside Utah, and the church's fifth-oldest temple still in operation. The Laie Hawaii Temple was formerly known as the Hawaiian Temple or the Hawaii Temple until the implementation of the standard naming convention for the church's temples.

== History ==
=== Sandwich Islands Mission ===
During the California Gold Rush, the first ten Mormon missionaries to Hawaii departed San Francisco on the ship Imaum of Muscat. After 20 days at sea, the ship arrived on December 12, 1850, in Honolulu Harbor at what was then known as the "Sandwich Islands" (Hawaiian Islands). A week later, nine missionaries received their assignments; two headed to the island of Kauaʻi, three to Lahaina on the island of Maui, two to the Big Island of Hawaiʻi, and two stayed behind in Honolulu. These nine missionaries formed the basis of the Sandwich Islands Mission. The church's first congregation in Hawaii was established on the island of Maui in 1851. Missionaries settled on the island of Lānaʻi in 1854, and in Lāʻie on the island of Oʻahu in 1865.

=== Lāʻie ===
In 1865, the church purchased a 6,000-acre (2,400 ha) sugarcane plantation for $14,000 as a gathering place for the Latter-day Saints in the area. While on a mission to the Sandwich Islands, Joseph F. Smith first proposed building a temple in Hawaii during a meeting in Lāʻie on February 15, 1885. George Q. Cannon, one of the original ten missionaries, visited Lāʻie in 1900 and became revered as a prophet for promoting the idea of a new Hawaiian temple among his congregations.

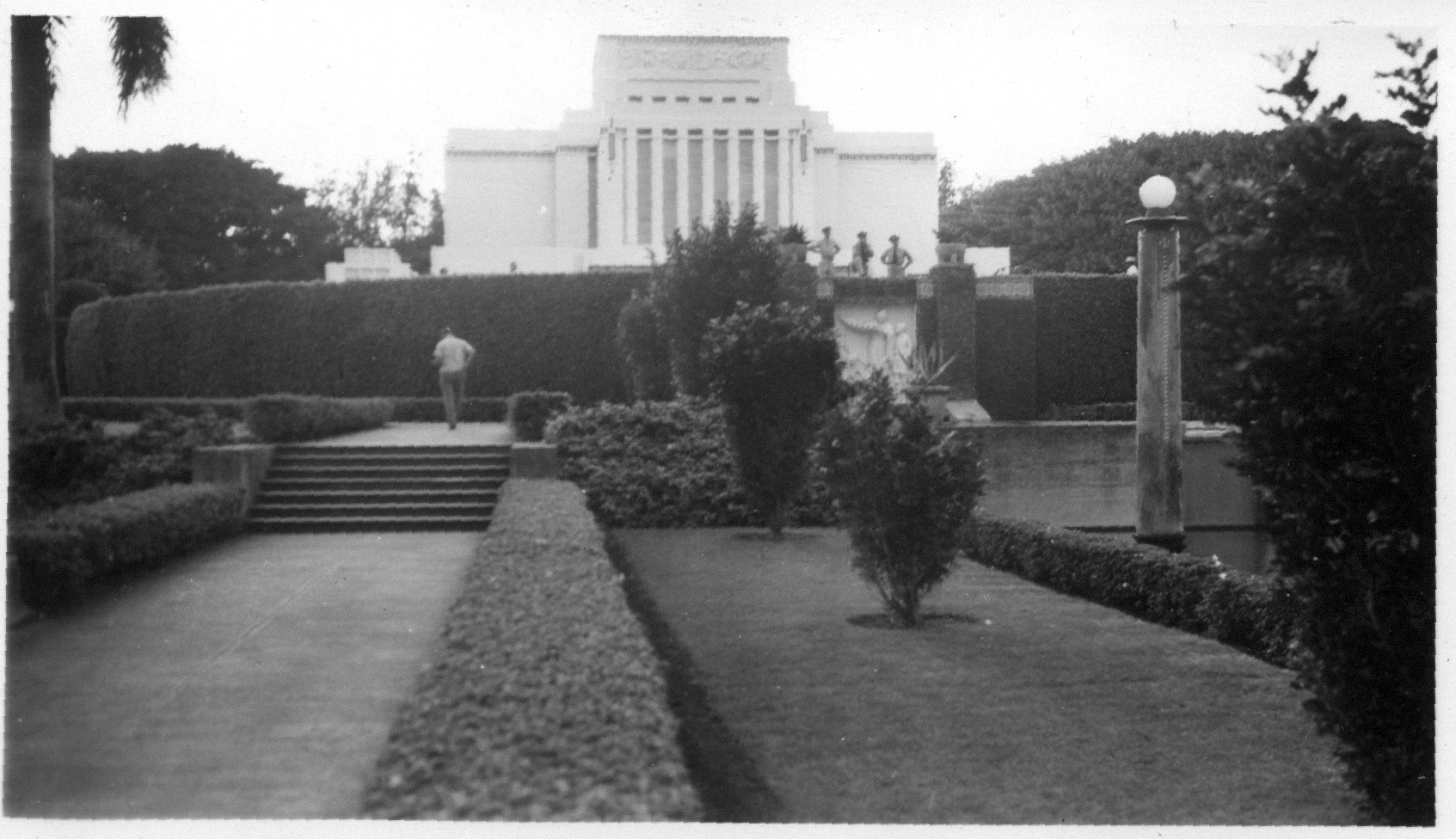
The Laie Hawaii Temple in 1922, two years after it was dedicated.

In 1915, Joseph F. Smith, then sixth president of the church, announced plans for the first temple outside the contiguous United States and chose Lāʻie for its construction. According to Mormon folklore, precious materials arrived just in time to complete the building of the temple: Temple builders ran out of wood (a scarce commodity on the islands) during initial construction, but local members received lumber when a ship ran aground and needed to unload some of its cargo of wood. The temple builders volunteered to help the ship and were given the lumber out of gratitude. The lumber taken from the ship proved to be just enough to finish the temple.

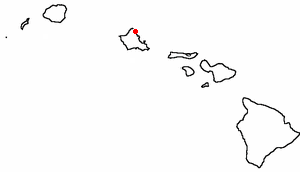
The town of Lāʻie (red dot) located on the Island of Oahu

When news of the new Laie Hawaii Temple reached Native Hawaiian converts (and other Polynesians) living far from home in the town of Iosepa, Utah, many decided to emigrate back to Hawaii. Although the Hawaiians had lived in Iosepa since 1889, the closest temple, Salt Lake Temple, was 75 miles away from the colony. Moving to Laie gave the Hawaiians the ability to be closer to the new temple and allowed them to perform sacred ordinances without having to travel great distances. By January 1917, most of the Hawaiians returned home, leaving Iosepa a ghost town.

Church president Heber J. Grant presided over the Hawaiian Temple's dedication on November 27, 1919. Grant called the Hawaiian people "descendants of Lehi" (a prophet in the Book of Mormon), and saw the future of the new temple in Lāʻie as a magnet for Polynesian converts. After the temple was completed, more Polynesians moved to Lāʻie, to participate in temple ordinances. Tourists were also drawn to the area, and guide books of the time compared the Lāʻie temple to the Taj Mahal.

The 1941 attack on Pearl Harbor gave rise to another popular tale about the Laie Hawaii Temple in church folklore. According to variations on this story, Japanese aircraft pilots attempted to bomb or strafe the Hawaiian Temple just prior to, or just after, the attack, but were thwarted by mechanical failure or from an unseen protective force. Some stories suggest that the Japanese pilot who attempted to attack the temple was converted to the church after he saw a picture of the temple in the possession of the faith's missionaries in Japan. Although there is an eyewitness who believes he saw the attempted bombing and a former missionary who says he met the Japanese convert, historians have found little supporting evidence that would substantiate these stories.

=== Renovation ===
Temples in Hawaii
- = Operating
- = Under construction
- = Announced
- = Temporarily Closed

Beginning in May 1976, the temple was closed for a two-year remodeling project, expanding from 10,500 square feet (980 m^{2}) to over 47,000 square feet (4,400 m^{2}). Church president Spencer W. Kimball rededicated the temple on June 13, 1978.

A $5.5 million renovation, renewal, and beautification project along Hale Laʻa Boulevard leading to the temple began in 2003, lasting 14 months: Norfolk pines suffering from termite infestation were replaced with royal palms, new decorative lighting was added to the terraces, and landscaped roundabouts were put in place. At the same time, the Visitors' Center was upgraded with interactive kiosks and new displays. There is now a cut-away model of the temple on display, which allows visitors to see its interior, because only members with an active recommend are allowed to enter after a temple is dedicated. It took the artisan team over eight months to build the temple model in the US and more than a week to reassemble the model for display after being shipped to Hawaii.

In December 2008, the Laie Hawaii Temple closed again for structural and seismic upgrades and to restore the ordinance rooms to their original appearance and progressive-style presentation of the endowment (still using film). The baptistry was repaired and renovated. The temple was rededicated on November 21, 2010, by Thomas S. Monson.

In 2020, like all the church's other temples, the Laie Hawaii Temple was closed in response to the coronavirus pandemic.

== Architecture ==
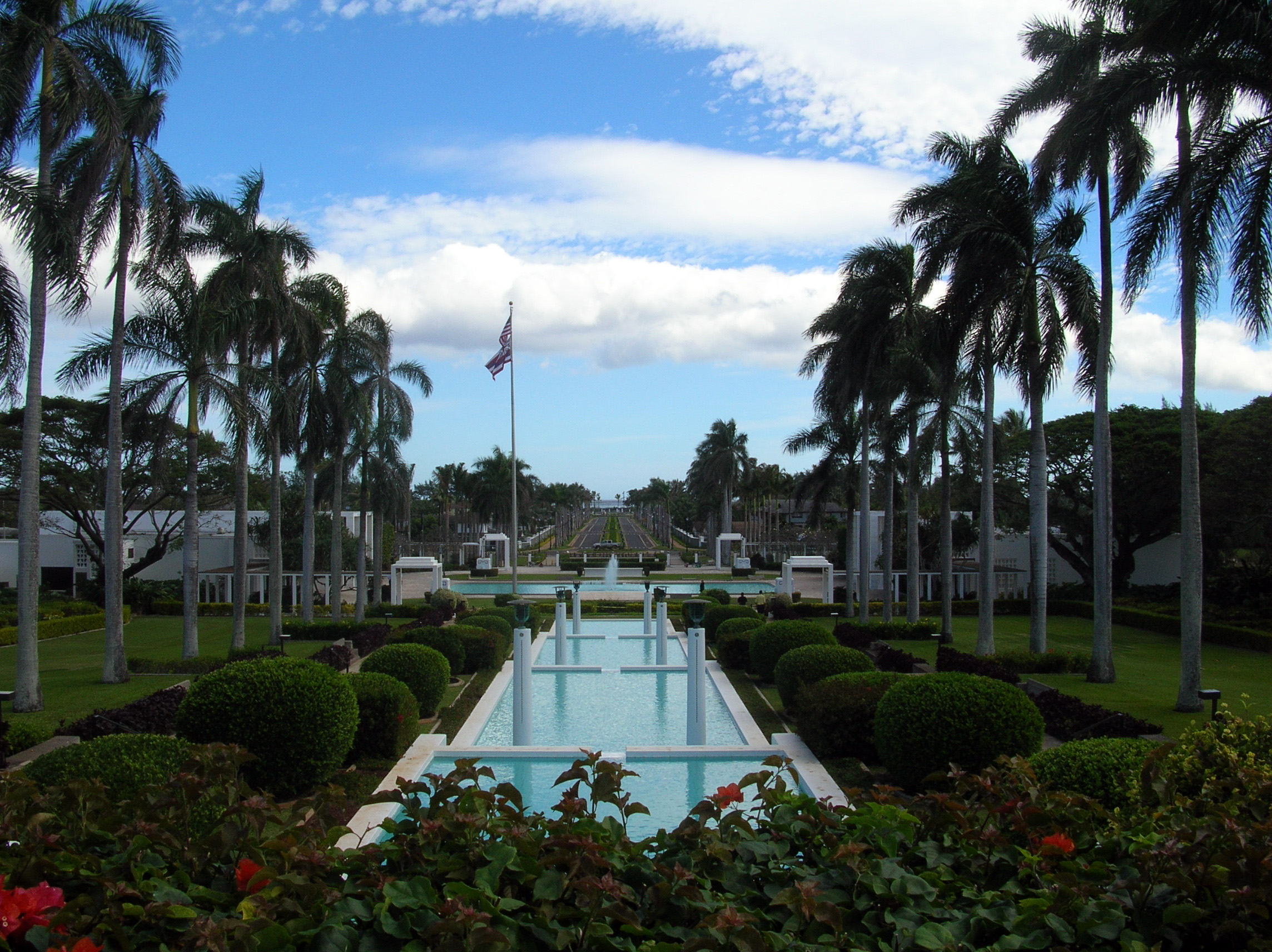
View from the temple's descending pools looking towards Hale Laʻa Boulevard and the Pacific Ocean

Church president Joseph F. Smith wanted the architecture of the Laie Hawaii Temple to resemble Solomon's Temple referred to in the biblical canon. The temple is often compared to the Cardston Alberta Temple, designed by young architects Hyrum Pope and Harold W. Burton. Pope and Burton's design was also used for Laie, and their work is rooted in the Prairie style architecture made popular by architect Frank Lloyd Wright in the early twentieth-century. The temples also evoke Mesoamerican architectural motifs, a favored theme of Burton's.

The temple sits on an 11-acre (4.5 ha) site that was once part of a large sugarcane plantation. Construction of the temple first began in February 1916. Native materials consisting of crushed lava rock were used to build the temple, along with reinforced concrete. The building's gleaming white finish was created using pneumatic stone-cutting techniques. The temple has the shape of a cross when seen from the air; the highest point of the temple is 50 ft (15.2 m), and it measures 102 ft (31.1 m) from east to west and 78 ft (23.8 m) from north to south.

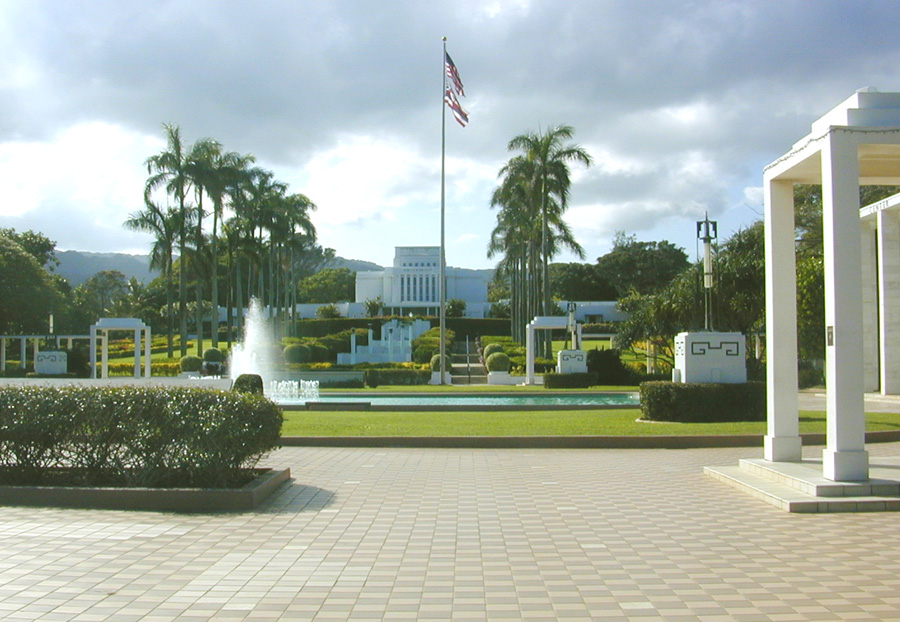
Looking up towards the temple from the reflecting pool and Visitors' Center

The exterior of the temple exhibits four large friezes planned by American sculptor J. Leo Fairbanks and built with the help of his brother Avard Fairbanks. Modeled four-fifths lifesize and cast in concrete, the bas-relief friezes depict God's dealings with Man. The north frieze depicts the story of the Book of Mormon. The west frieze shows the people of the Old Testament. The New Testament and the Apostasy are depicted on the southern frieze of the temple, and the restoration of the church through Joseph Smith is shown on the east frieze. On the grounds of the temple are statues also designed by the Fairbanks brothers, including Joseph being blessed by his father and one of the Prophet Lehi in a scene from the Second Book of Nephi in the Book of Mormon.

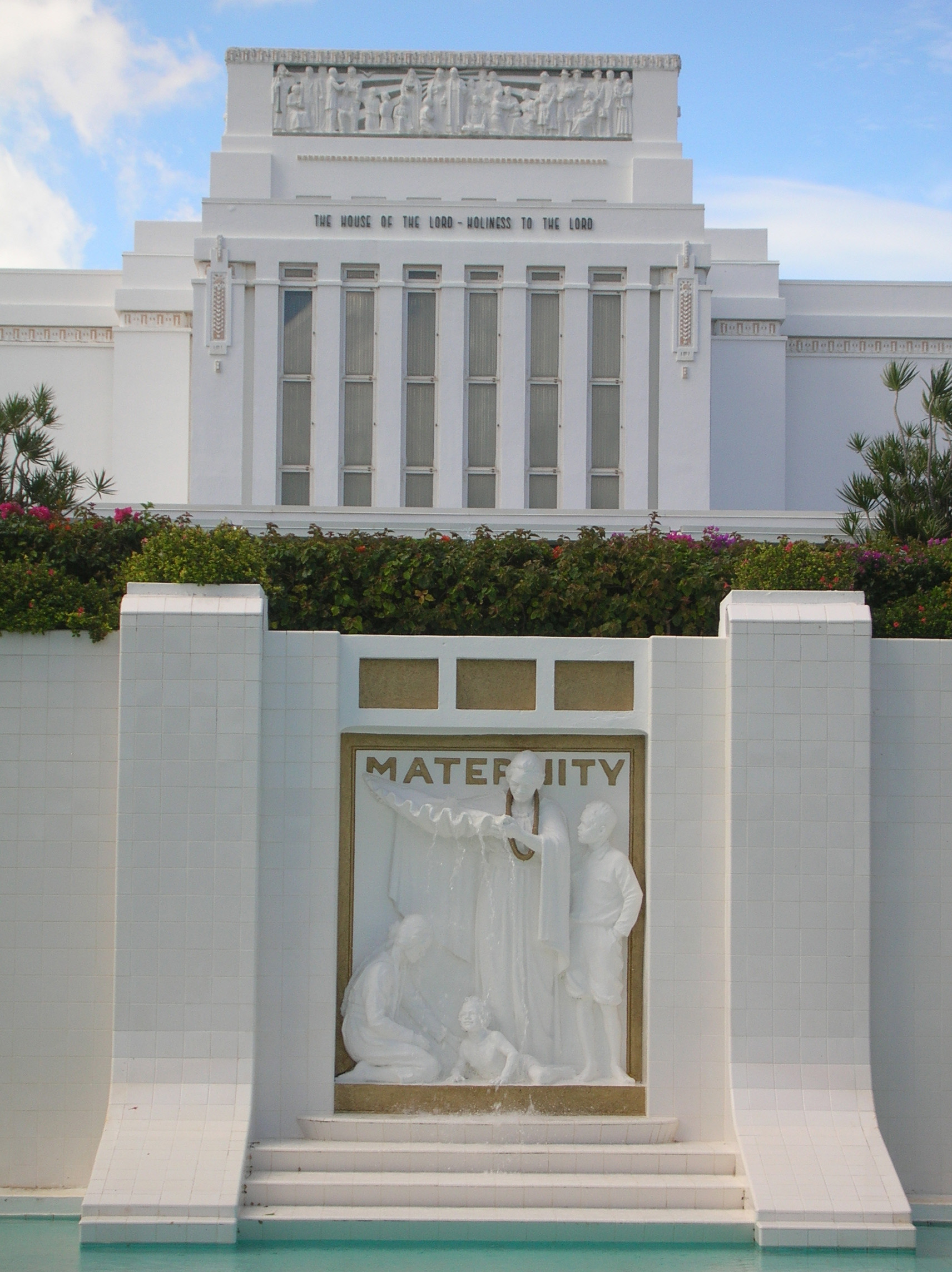
Maternity Fountain

As visitors approach the temple and pass a number of reflecting pools, a maternity fountain sits in front of the uppermost pool. Designed by the Fairbanks brothers, this bold relief honors Hawaiian Motherhood and depicts a Hawaiian mother holding a giant clam shell while pouring water over her children. The act is supposed to symbolize mothers pouring their love, hope and care onto their children.

The landscaped temple grounds contain tropical gardens, with plants such as hibiscus, Brazilian plume, birds of paradise, lantana, red ginger, bougainvillea, plumeria, Ixora, and others. At the base of the temple grounds is a fountain separating a Family History Center and a Visitors' Center, where a ten-foot sculpture replica of Bertel Thorvaldsen's Christus stands inside the entrance.

The Laie Hawaii Temple is 47,224 square feet (4,387.3 m^{2}) and houses three ordinance rooms and six sealing rooms. Landscape artist LeConte Stewart designed many of the murals found inside the temple.

== Admittance ==
Laie Hawaii Temple is not used for regular Sunday worship. As temples require church approval to enter, only church members who are recommended by their local bishop are allowed to enter for the purpose of participating in ceremonies such as endowments, baptism for the dead and marriage. Because of these guidelines, those without an active recommend are not allowed inside temples, but public tours of the grounds outside and of the visitors' centers are available.

== Temple presidents ==
Notable temple presidents include Edward L. Clissold (1936–38, 1943–44, 1963–65); D. Arthur Haycock (1986–89), and J. Richard Clarke (1998–2001).

== See also ==
- Comparison of temples of The Church of Jesus Christ of Latter-day Saints
- Kona Hawaii Temple
- List of temples of The Church of Jesus Christ of Latter-day Saints
- List of temples of The Church of Jesus Christ of Latter-day Saints by geographic region
- The Church of Jesus Christ of Latter-day Saints in Hawaii
