= Speed The Band =

- Origin: Laie, Hawaii, USA
- Genres: Alternative rock, folk, pop
- Years active: 2009–present
- Labels: One And You Are Done
- Members: Carrie Speed Owsley; Paul Speed; John Speed; Johnny Beutler; Patrick Owsley; Stephanie Speed Hennings; Bethany Speed Schoneman
- Website: speedtheband.com

Speed The Band is a pop/folk band from Laie, Hawaii. The band consists of family members Carrie Speed Owsley, Paul Speed, John Speed, Patrick Owsly, Johnny Beutler, Stephanie Speed Hennings, and Bethany Speed. Speed The Band formed in 2009 and released their debut album, Transpacific Comfort, in December 2010. Carrie, Paul, John, Stephanie, and Bethany are all brothers and sisters while Patrick is Carrie's husband and Johnny is married to Stephanie's husband's sister. The band's songwriting style and stage presence is very much based on their family dynamic. They have been called a "modern-day Partridge Family".

== Background ==
Speed The Band began playing together when the family all lived in Orange County, California. At the time, Carrie was not yet married and Patrick Owsley was not a member of the band. It was not until Carrie moved to Oahu to attend BYU Hawaii that Patrick joined the group. Paul Speed also moved to Hawaii around the same time as his sister, Carrie, splitting up the band members across an ocean. John Speed had been in Kailua managing his company Kilauea Pest Control since 2002. The band continued to play despite the challenging arrangement and managed to write, record and release their debut album in the Winter of 2010. While there are no signs of the band members ever living in the same land mass again, they are currently touring in Hawaii and California as well as writing and recording their follow-up album.

== Albums and touring ==
Speed The Band has played at venues in both Hawaii and California. Most recently playing at Hollywood, California's Hotel Café on the mainland and BYU Hawaii's annual Fall Ball event on Oahu. The band's debut album release came out on December 13, 2010 and is called "Transpacific Comfort". Thus far, the album has received critical acclaim from indie music website, IndieRockReviews.com (who called the band "Indie Rock Gods") as well as the Orange County Register. A follow-up second album is reported to be in the works.

== Charities and causes ==
In March 2010, Speed The Band wrote and recorded a song called "Chelsea Runs" in tribute to Chelsea King, a recently slain San Diego youth whose cause immediately became the driving force behind new child protection laws in the state of California. The band released a music video for the song which quickly gained momentum and aided in the efforts of Chelsea's Light Foundation, an organization started by Brent and Kelly King, parents of Chelsea. Since the release of the song and video, Speed The Band has played two benefit concerts for Chelsea's Light and has continued to work on the strengthening of child protection laws nationwide.

== Discography ==
2010 Transpacific Comfort

- Released: December 13, 2010
- Label: One And You Are Done, mikespeedrecords

2007 Angelina Dreams-Single

- Released: May 10, 2007
- Label: mikespeedrecords.
