= Hukilau =

Ancient Hawaiian fishing method

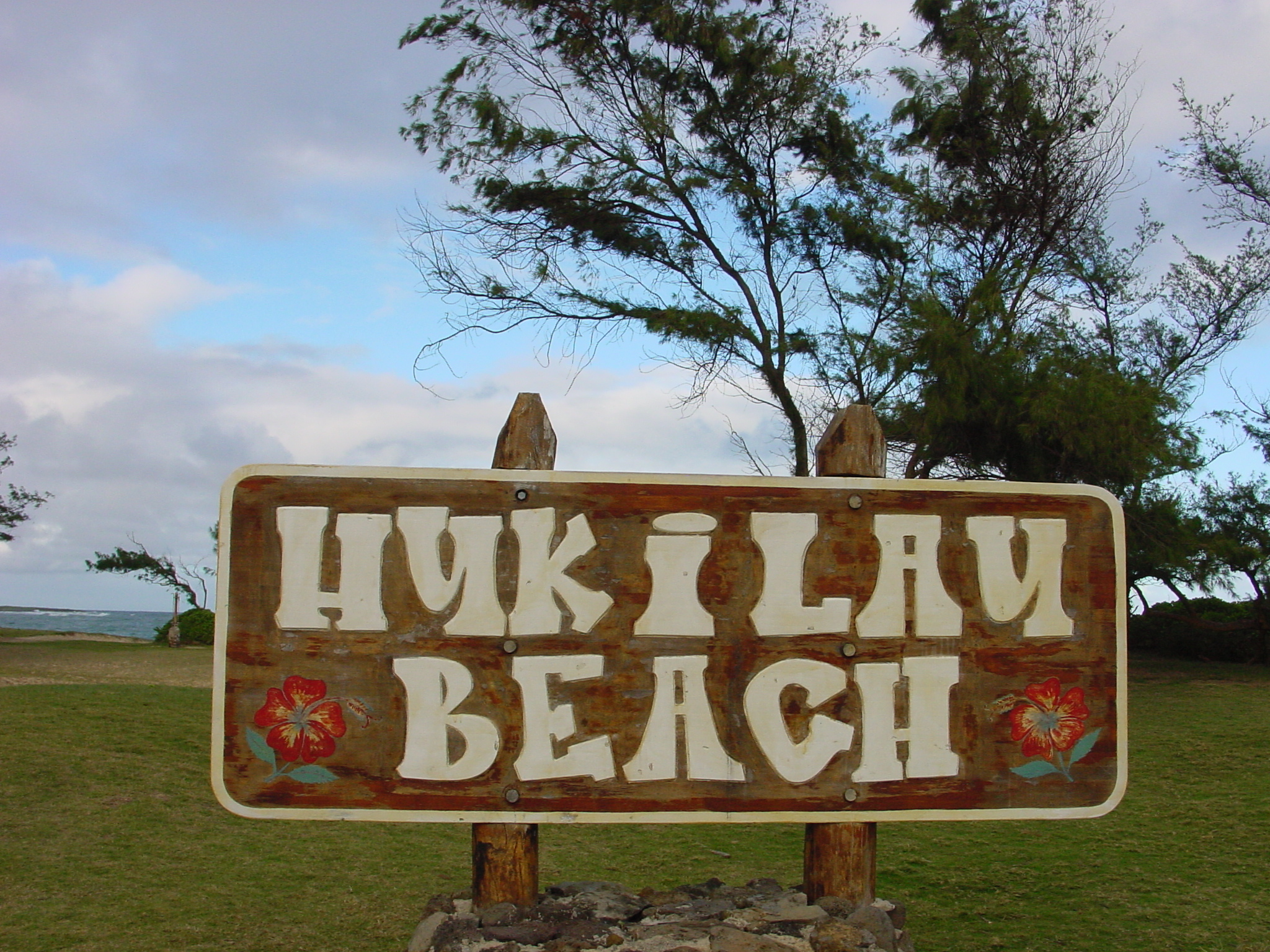
Hukilau Beach, Lā'ie, Hawai'i

A hukilau is a way of fishing invented by the ancient Hawaiians. The word comes from huki, meaning pull, and lau, meaning leaves. A large number of people, usually family and friends, would work together in casting the net from shore and then pulling it back. The net was lined with ti leaves, which would help scare the fish into the center of the net. Consistent with the Hawaiian subsistence economy, anybody who helped could share in the catch. Hukilau Beach, in Lā'ie, is named after the technique, which has been used there for centuries.

A festive beach gathering is also known to local Hawaiians as a hukilau, and there is a traditional song and dance known as the hukilau, a scattered line dance.

== Dress and wear ==
Men wear a malo or a bikini, similar to a loincloth, or a 'ie lavalava, which is a piece of Kapa cloth wrapped around the waist. Women wear a pa'u, made from Kapa cloth. Many garments in modern times can also be made of fabric cloth.

== Dance ==
The hukilau is a scattered line dance created in 1948 by Jack Owens. It consists of basic hula steps and arm movements to represent the fishing aspect of the dance.

== See also ==
- The Hukilau Song
- Polynesian Cultural Center
