= The Hukilau Song =

Single by Jack Owens
- Released: 1948
- Recorded: 1948
- Genre: Hawaiian Luau Music
- Label: Lombardo Music
- Songwriter: Jack Owens

"The Hukilau Song" is a song written by Jack Owens in 1948 after attending a luau in Laie, Hawaii.

== Covers ==
The song has been recorded many times by a variety of artists.

- Alfred Apaka
- Ab Orchestra
- Ray Conniff
- Bing Crosby — Return to Paradise Islands (1963)
- Book 'em Danno
- Cruis'n Peidl
- Disney Sing-Along Songs
- Josh Dobrin and The All Saints Gangsters
- Nate Gibson and the Gashouse Gang
- The Hit Crew
- Don Ho
- Big Kahuna and the Copa Cat Pack
- Big Pineapple
- Webley Edwards
- Annette Funicello
- Amy Gilliom & Willie K
- Hawaiian Escape
- George Kahumoku, Jr.
- Gerrit & de Kokosnoten
- Lester Lanin
- Sam Makia
- Marcy Marxer
- The Mauna Loa Islanders
- New Hawaiian Band
- The Ol Leadvocals Band
- Mel Peterson
- Tiny Tim
- Ukulele Magic

== In popular culture ==
- The song was featured in the American television show South Park in the episode "Do the Handicapped Go to Hell?"
- The song was featured in the American television show Hey Arnold! in the episode "Casa Paradiso"
- The song inspired a line in the Sublime song "Freeway Time in LA County Jail" which reads "And I'm back on the reef/where I throw my net out into the sea/all the fine hynas come swimming to me"
- Alf sang the chorus in the episode “It’s My Party” (Season 4, Episode 14) of ALF (TV series)
- Various versions of the song feature in the resort music loop heard around Disney's Polynesian Village Resort at Walt Disney World.

== See also ==
- Hukilau
