= John B. Dickson =

American LDS Church general authority (born 1943)

Second Quorum of the Seventy
- June 6, 1992 – April 1, 1995
- Called by: Ezra Taft Benson
- End reason: Transferred to First Quorum of the Seventy

First Quorum of the Seventy
- April 1, 1995 – October 5, 2013
- Called by: Gordon B. Hinckley
- End reason: Designated an emeritus general authority

Personal details
- Born: John Baird Dickson; July 12, 1943 (age 83); Tacoma, Washington, United States

John Baird Dickson (born July 12, 1943) has been a general authority of the Church of Jesus Christ of Latter-day Saints (LDS Church) since 1992.

Dickson was born on July 12, 1943, to John H. Dickson and Helen Baird in Tacoma, Washington. Dickson began service as an LDS missionary in Mexico in 1962. Before he departed he was diagnosed with bone cancer in his right arm. He was not expected to live more than a month. However, 10 months later he left to serve his assigned mission having had his arm amputated. He graduated from Brigham Young University in 1968 and joined the family sawmill business in Washington.

== LDS Church service ==
Dickson was called to the Second Quorum of the Seventy in June 1992 after serving as a stake president in Mt. Vernon, Washington, for eight years. Prior to that he served as the first president of the church's Mexico City North Mission from 1978 to 1981. In April 1995, Dickson became a member of the First Quorum of the Seventy.

As a general authority, Dickson served as executive director of the Audiovisual Department and as Assistant Executive Director in the Priesthood and Missionary departments. He was also president of the church's South America South, North America West, and Asia areas. After serving previously as a counselor in the same area, he was assigned in 2011 as president of the Africa West Area, where he served until August 2013. In October 2013, Dickson was released from the First Quorum of the Seventy and designated as an emeritus general authority.

== Personal life ==
Dickson married Delores Jones in 1966. He and his wife are the parents of eight children—one boy and seven girls.

== See also ==
- "Called to Serve", New Era: 14, July 1995
