= Jack Owens (singer-songwriter) =

- Owens as he appears on the cover of "The Hukilau Song" record album.

Background information
- Born: John Milton Owens; October 17, 1912; Tulsa, Oklahoma, United States
- Died: January 26, 1982 (aged 69) Phoenix, Arizona, United States
- Occupations: Singer-songwriter, pianist
- Instrument: Piano

John Milton Owens (October 17, 1912 – January 26, 1982) was a singer-songwriter, pianist, and star of the longest running network radio show Don McNeil's Breakfast Club. He was known as "The Cruising Crooner" because of his unique showmanship of cruising through mostly female audiences attending the live Breakfast Club broadcasts, and crooning love ballads to the blushing and giggling women, often singing directly to them, one at a time, sitting on their laps, and nuzzling close to them.

Owens was born in Tulsa, Oklahoma. From his start in small, local Chicago radio stations holding up applause signs and his brief performances in vaudeville, to his fame on NBC and ABC as a radio singing star with movie star looks, Owens found ways to stay in the spotlight in popular music with catchy songs, love ballads, and even Hawaiian songs. Some of his music even appeared in such movies as San Antonio Rose in 1941 and From Here to Eternity in 1953.

Owens, who married fellow Chicago radio star Helen Streiff in the early 1930s, started his recording career with independent label, Tower Records, and then after the huge success of "The Hukilau Song", and "I'll Weave a Lei of Stars for You" in 1948, he was signed to Decca, the biggest label at the time.

Overlooked or forgotten by many today, Owens was America's 10th favorite male vocalist from 1936 to 1944. He was best known for writing or co-writing such successful tunes as "The Hut-Sut Song", "Hi, Neighbor", "How Soon", "The Hukilau Song", and "I'll Weave a Lei of Stars for You". He either wrote, co-wrote, composed, recorded, or some combination of these music credits, more than 50 songs spanning from the mid-1930s to the early 1960s.

He also had his own TV show, The Jack Owens Show (aka The Brunch Bunch), during the pioneer days of TV of the early 1950s, and even received two Emmy nominations.

Though his songs have been covered by numerous well-known artists – Gene Autry, Roy Rogers, Bing Crosby, Freddy Martin, The Merry Macs, Andy Williams, Perry Como, Dinah Shore, Woody Herman, Vaughn Monroe, the Glenn Miller Orchestra, Kay Kyser Orchestra, Sammy Kaye Orchestra, Nat "King" Cole, Orrin Tucker, Spike Jones, Pat Boone, Ferlin Husky, The Platters, The Cadets / The Jacks (of "Why Don't You Write Me" fame), Alfred Apaka, Don Ho and Frank Sinatra – they have not always been correctly credited to him, have lacked adequate information about him, or have been misattributed to blues singer Jack Owens.

Owens retired from show business in 1957 and worked in real estate in Phoenix. Although he co-wrote "Back In Aloha Land" in 1963, and he co-wrote "I'm The Only One That Wants Me" in 1965, the pop era of music he once embraced and sang had gone by the wayside, falling in the shadows of rock and roll and the Beatles.

He served as honorary mayor of Pacific Palisades, California from 1955 to 1957. Owens appeared in a Mae West movie, The Heat's On. His music publishing company, Owens-Kemp Music Co. was located in Hollywood, where the present day Walk of Fame is located. He was also the uncle of Roger Owens, the famed peanut vendor at Dodger Stadium.

Jack Owens died in Phoenix, Arizona, aged 69, on January 26, 1982.
