= Kepelino =

Native Hawaiian cultural historian

- Born: c. 1830; Kailua-Kona, Hawaiʻi, Kingdom of Hawaii
- Died: c. 1878
- Occupations: Historian, Teacher, Writer
- Known for: Writing Kepelino's Traditions of Hawaii

Zepherin "Kepelino" Kahōʻāliʻi Keauokalani (c. 1830 – c. 1878) was a Native Hawaiian cultural historian who wrote Kepelino's Traditions of Hawaii. Born into a family descended from both the Hawaiian priestly class and nobility, Kepelino converted to Roman Catholicism with his family at an early age. He was educated by Catholic missionaries and briefly joined the mission to Tahiti before returning to finish his education in Honolulu. He became an editor of a Hawaiian language newspaper for Hawaiian Catholics and contributed many written works to the history and culture of Hawaii. Serving as a private secretary to Queen Emma of Hawaii, he espoused her candidacy for the throne in the 1874 monarchical election against Kalākaua. After the queen's loss in the election and Kalākaua's accession to the throne, Kepelino became involved in an attempt to overthrow the new king in favor of Queen Emma, which led to his trial and imprisonment for treason.

== Name ==
Kepelino is the Hawaiianized pronunciation of his Christian name Zepherin (written in its French form) or Zephyrin. His names are rendered in many forms. Confusingly, he used the names Kahōʻāliʻi (which was short for Kahōʻāliʻikumaieiwakamoku) and Keauokalani interchangeably as his surname. He signed his names as Z. Teauotalani, Zepherin Keauokalani, John P. Zephyrina Kahoalii and other alternate forms. The most complete name he used was Zepherin Kuhopu Kahoalii Kameeiamoku Kuikauwai.

== Early life ==
Born at Kailua-Kona, on the island of Hawaii, around 1830, he was named Kahōʻāliʻikumaieiwakamoku, which meant "to-be-the-chief-of-the-nine-districts", after the traditional districts (moku) of Hilo, Puna, Kaʻū, North Kona, South Kona, North Kohala, South Kohala, Hāmākua, and Mokuola. His father Namiki was a descendant of the priestly lineage of Paʻao, and his mother Kahiwa Kānekapōlei was a daughter of King Kamehameha I, the founder of the Kingdom of Hawaii. A sister named Puahau married Piimauna. In 1853, Kepelino met French writer Jules Rémy and provided him with a genealogy of the priestly line of Paʻao. Rémy would also use of Namiki's unpublished works in his narrative Récits d'un vieux sauvage pour servir à l'histoire ancienne de Havaii (Contributions of a Venerable Savage to the Ancient History of the Hawaiian Islands).

Until the 1839 Edict of Toleration, Roman Catholicism was banned, French missionaries were deported and Hawaiians converts persecuted under the reign of the ultra Protestant Queen Kaʻahumanu who ruled as regent for King Kamehameha III. French military intervention in 1839 eventually forced the Kamehameha III to lift the persecution and allow the Catholic missionaries to establish a mission in the Hawaiian Islands. On June 26, 1840, Catholic missionaries Father Arsenius Walsh and Father Ernest Heurtel came from Honolulu to Kailua to establish a mission on the island of Hawaii, which later became the St. Michael the Archangel Church. Kepelino and his parents were among the first Hawaiians in Kailua to convert to the Catholic faith. After his conversion, he was given the name Zepherin or Kepelino, possibly after the second-century Pope Zephyrinus. Sent to Honolulu, Kepelino was educated by the Catholic missionaries to be a lay teacher and received a basic education in reading, writing, geography, and arithmetic. In 1847, he accompanied Father Heurtel as an assistant missionary to Tahiti, in hope that he would be able to attract young Tahitian converts to Catholicism. His passage was paid by Bishop Louis Désiré Maigret, the Vicar Apostolic of the Sandwich (Hawaiian) Islands. Heurtel and Kepelino left on June 5 and arrived in Tahiti on July 6 after a thirty-one days voyage. The Tahitian Catholic mission was largely unsuccessful. Competition from the established Protestant mission, which was founded in 1797 by the London Missionary Society, proved too fierce, and the family and children of Tahitian Protestants were ordered by the Protestant clergy to not socialize with Kepelino. Without an assigned purpose, the restless youth became idle and cause mischief in the mission. Father Heurtel, fearing the young Hawaiian would be "lost in this Babylon of ours", wrote a letter to Bishop Maigret on August 25, asking Kepelino be sent back to Hawaii:

Something else. I had taken along with me Zepherin in order to try to attract the kanaka children to the school, and he would have succeeded perfectly if it had been possible. There are children who liked him very much, but the Protestant ministers are as bad at Tahiti as those of [the] Sandwich [Islands] and they caused to be demolished what he wanted to build. They told the parents that if they allowed the children to go to the Pope they would cease to belong to the church. The intimidated parents have forbidden their children to come to see us, and they all have left. Since then Zepherin, having nothing more to occupy him, has got bored; he has begun to play some little pranks and as I am afraid that idleness may become a cause of [his] getting lost in this Babylon of ours, I have resolved to send him back to his parents. I ask you, Bishop, to send him to Hawaii by the first occasion.

== Career ==
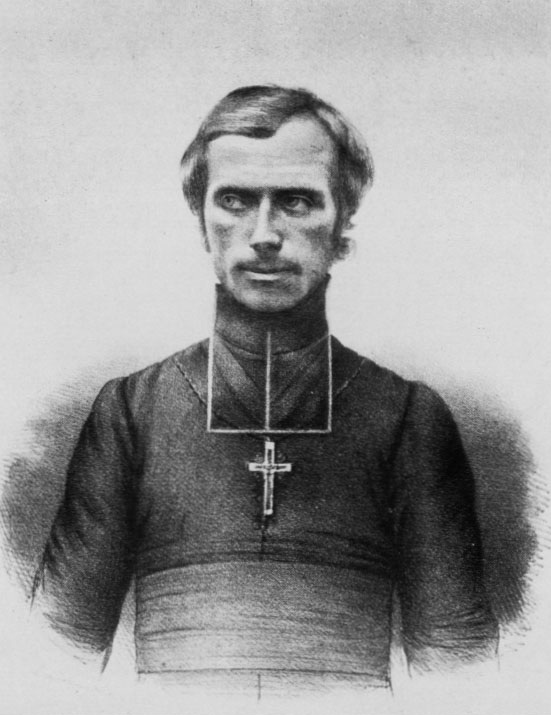
Kepelino was a protégé of Bishop Louis Désiré Maigret (pictured), who founded the Catholic mission in Hawaii

Returning to Hawaii, nothing much is known about his life for a period of time. Between 1861 and 1869, he continued his education at the College of ʻĀhuimanu, founded in 1846 by the Congregation of the Sacred Hearts of Jesus and Mary. Learning English, French, Latin, and Greek, he was taught by Bishop Maigret. From 1860 to 1861, he wrote for the Hawaiian Catholic newspaper Ka Hae Kiritiano where he published what were described as “controversial letters” under the name of “Z. Kahoalii”. In 1869, he wrote letters for another newspaper Ka Hae Katolika and composed three dirges for Father Walsh. All these publications were dated from Honouliuli, Oahu, possibly where he was living. During this period, Kepelino also lived with a student of Hawaiian lore named Koha and became part of small group of Hawaiians who met to discuss Hawaiian history, culture and traditions from the past.

By 1874, Kepelino serve as the private secretary of Queen Emma, the widow of King Kamehameha IV who reigned from 1855 to his death in 1863, helping her compose proclamations in Hawaiian and acting as a royal emissary between the queen and her political supporters. Historian Alfons L. Korn notes: "His activities as Emma’s secretary are reflected only flickeringly in written records of the period, but it seems probable that he assisted both in matters of genealogy and rhetoric, and composed certain of her proclamations to her native audience."

== Imprisoned for treason ==
Kepelino was a staunch supporter of Emma's right to succeed King Lunalilo in the Royal Election of 1874 against Kalākaua. During the days leading up to the election, he wrote to the King of Italy and Queen Victoria asking for warships to support Queen Emma's claim. These letters were intercepted by Kalākaua in his capacity as postmaster general. Upon the announcement of Kalākaua's victory over Emma on February 12, 1874, her supporters instigated the Honolulu Courthouse riot which saw the destruction of government property and assault of multiple legislators who had voted against the queen. In order to quell the civil disruption, American and British troops were landed with the permission of the Hawaiian government, and the rioters were arrested. Kepelino later claimed he played a role in quelling the unrest and attempted to have the queen come down from Hānaiakamalama to stop her supporters. After the riot, Kepelino continued his political support for his employer and the Emmaites or the Queen Emma Party which formed to oppose the new king. In the summer of 1874, he started a petition to the French commissioner, Theo Ballieu, requesting French intervention to dethrone Kalākaua. The petition, which was dated July 14 and signed under the name "John P. Zephyrina Kahoalii", argued "D. Kalakaua is not the rightful King, Therefore we grieve for the broken peace, and the loss of our independence. Because, this false king is doing that which will destroy our independence and cause great disturbance in the future. For this false king (D. Kalakaua) is very desirous of mortgaging the government to some foreign government for a million dollars."

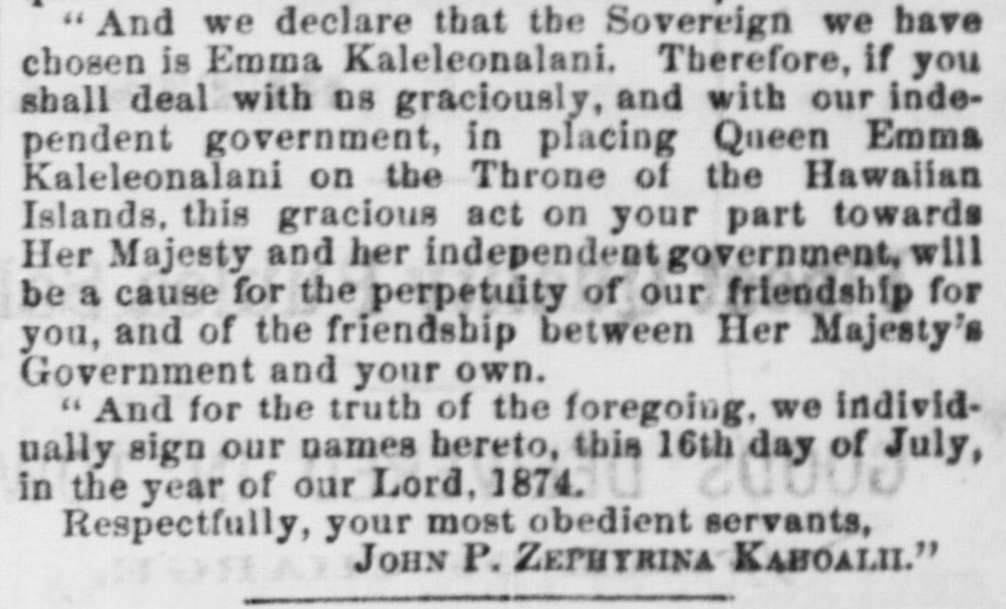
Petition to the French Commissioner (translated excerpt), 1874

The king had Kepelino and four other Hawaiians arrested on charges of treason on August 7 and 8. The four others were released after the preliminary hearing on August 15 while Kepelino was committed for treason at a later hearing. Treason was defined in section 1 of chapter 6 of the Hawaiian Penal Code as: "Treason is hereby defined to be any plotting or attempt to dethrone or destroy the King, or levying of war against the King’s Government, or adhering to the enemies thereof, giving them aid or comfort, the same being done by a person owing allegiance to the Kingdom.” His trial before the Supreme Court on October 6 was the first treason trial in the kingdom since the signing of the 1840 Constitution. He was defended by Kapahei Kauai, a Native Hawaiian district judge from Waimea, Kauai, and J. Porter Green, a Honolulu attorney descended from an American missionary family. Despite his counsel's argument that the petition was not a secret and that it had never reached the French official to whom it was addressed, the jury made up of Native Hawaiians reached a unanimous verdict of guilty in less than twenty minutes.

On October 12, Kepelino was sentenced to death by hanging by the presiding judge Supreme Court Justice Charles Coffin Harris. Kepelino and Green, as his defense attorney, appealed to the court and requested the king's mercy. In a statement to the judge, Kepelino stated: "His Majesty has no more loyal subject than I; I would be willing to risk my life for him. On the 12th of February I was requested to use my influence towards quelling the riot, and I did so. I was asked to try and get Queen Emma to come down and quell the riot and I did request her to come.” The appeal was forwarded to the king and his Privy Council. He was placed in Oahu Prison to await his execution by hanging which was scheduled for the first Friday of March 1875. Shortly before Kalākaua left on his state visit to the United States, the sentence was commuted by Royal Warrant on November 13 from the death sentence to ten years imprisonment. He would serve almost two years of his sentence at Oahu Prison. Through the intercession of Bishop Maigret, King Kalākaua and his Privy Council pardoned and released Kepelino on September 23, 1876. Five other prisoners pardoned on the same day were originally rioters from the 1874 election.

Queen Emma's surviving letters do not talk about the ordeal surrounding Kepelino's arrest and imprisonment in detail. Only brief notes are made of Kepelino in the letters her cousin Peter Kaʻeo wrote to Emma, and the surviving letters mainly showed Kaʻeo's concern for him. Writing on August 8, 1874, shortly after the arrest and before the trial, Kaʻeo stated "I most sincerely hope that Kepelino will escape all harm and be Victorious in every way." On October 26, after learning of the ruling, Kaʻeo remarked on the fate of Kepelino: "I pitty Kepelino for having undergone such hardships. But in all I like it, thus showing the D. K.s [supporters of Kalākaua] how firm the Natives still are for you." Korn commented on Emma's calculating manner and continued political ambition despite what had happened to her supporters:

Unfortunately, because of the loss of important letters (drafts as well as originals) on which to base conclusions, it is difficult to describe, let alone try to appraise, the queen’s conduct during this period. Less given to bursts of vituperation than her ordinarily mild cousin, she nevertheless reveals here and there a touch of malice, even of venom. It is as if the polar strands of her character, the teachings of her Anglican faith and her mid-Victorian and womanly devotion to duty and civic good works, had become confusedly entangled with her yearning as an alii to wield political power: to win the Kamehameha throne and play her rightful part, as she saw it, on the ancestral stage. In any event, while poor Kepelino languished in prison, the queen’s suppressed but restless conspiratorial impulses continued uneasily to cast about for satisfaction.

Kepelino never married and died about 1878, shortly after his release from prison, at an age between forty-five and fifty.

== Legacy ==
A noted cultural historian, Kepelino wrote extensively on the culture and history of his people. Because of his family lineage, he was versed in the traditions of the kahuna (priests) and aliʻi (chiefs) from an early age. Between 1858 and 1860, he wrote Hooiliili Hawaii ("Hawaiian Collection") in a four-part series. The first part of this work were translated and republished by Bacil F. Kirtley and Esther T. Mookini in 1977. In 1868, he wrote his more famous work Moolelo Hawaii, which remained unpublished until it was translated after his death by Martha Warren Beckwith in 1932 as Kepelino's Traditions of Hawaii. His writing combined both Hawaiian and Western Christian elements, and indicative of his missionary upbringing, he portrayed the ancient Hawaiian political system as a form of despotism. Some of his other publications include Ka Mooolelo O na la Havaii (The Story of the Fish of Hawaii) in 1867 and He Vahi Huli-Toa Manu Havaii (A Description of Hawaiian Birds). Kepelino's works place him among the ranks of other early Hawaiian writers such as David Malo, John Papa ʻĪʻī, Samuel Kamakau and S. N. Haleʻole.

Remarking on the biography of Kepelino, Alfons L. Korn notes:

Knowledge of his background and interests is largely based on the work of Father Reginald Yzendoorn, historian of the Roman Catholic church in Hawaii, who was the chief source of biographical information used by Martha Warren Beckwith in her introductions to two of Kepelino’s works: Kepelino's Traditions of Hawaii (Bishop Museum Bulletin, No. 9s, Honolulu, 1932); and The Kumulipo, a Hawaiian Creation Chant (Honolulu: The University Press ofHawaii, 1972).

== Bibliography ==
- Bunson, Maggie (1977). Faith in Paradise: A Century and a Half of the Roman Catholic Church in Hawaii. Boston: St. Paul Editions. ISBN 9780819804143. OCLC 2896226.
- Forbes, David W., ed. (2001). Hawaiian National Bibliography, 1780–1900. Vol. 3. Honolulu: University of Hawaii Press. ISBN 978-0-8248-2503-4. OCLC 314293370.
- Kaeo, Peter; Queen Emma (1976). Korn, Alfons L. (ed.). News from Molokai, Letters Between Peter Kaeo & Queen Emma, 1873–1876. Honolulu: The University Press of Hawaii. hdl:10125/39980. ISBN 978-0-8248-0399-5. OCLC 2225064.
- Kanahele, George S. (1999). Emma: Hawaii's Remarkable Queen. Honolulu: University of Hawaii Press. ISBN 978-0-8248-2240-8. OCLC 40890919.
- Kepelino (2007) [1932]. Kepelino's Traditions of Hawaii. Translated by Martha Warren Beckwith. Bishop Museum Press. ISBN 978-1-58178-060-4. OCLC 16791517.
- Kepelino (1977). "Kepelino's "Hawaiian Collection": His "Hooiliili Havaii," Pepa 1, 1858". The Hawaiian Journal of History. 11. Translated by Bacil F. Kirtley and Esther T. Mookini. Honolulu: 125–151. hdl:10524/184. OCLC 60626541.
- Kuykendall, Ralph Simpson (1965) [1938]. The Hawaiian Kingdom 1778–1854, Foundation and Transformation. Vol. 1. Honolulu: University of Hawaii Press. ISBN 978-0-87022-431-7. OCLC 47008868.
- Kuykendall, Ralph Simpson (1967). The Hawaiian Kingdom 1874–1893, The Kalakaua Dynasty. Vol. 3. Honolulu: University of Hawaii Press. ISBN 978-0-87022-433-1. OCLC 500374815.
- McKinzie, Edith Kawelohea (1986). Stagner, Ishmael W. (ed.). Hawaiian Genealogies: Extracted from Hawaiian Language Newspapers. Vol. 2. Honolulu: University of Hawaii Press. p. 48. ISBN 978-0-939154-37-1. OCLC 12555087.
- Osorio, Jon Kamakawiwoʻole (2002). Dismembering Lāhui: A History of the Hawaiian Nation to 1887. Honolulu: University of Hawaii Press. ISBN 978-0-8248-2549-2. OCLC 48579247.
- Rémy, Jules (1859). Récits d'un vieux sauvage pour servir à l'histoire ancienne de Havaii. Châlons-sur-Marne: E. Laurent. OCLC 154668936.
- Valeri, Valerio (1985). Kingship and Sacrifice: Ritual and Society in Ancient Hawaii. Chicago: University of Chicago Press. ISBN 978-0-226-84560-9. OCLC 11399030.
- Yzendoorn, Reginald (1927). History of the Catholic Mission in the Hawaiian Islands. Honolulu: Honolulu Star-Bulletin. OCLC 5524024.
