= Martha Warren Beckwith =

American folklorist and ethnographer (1871–1959)

- Born: January 19, 1871; Wellesley Heights, Massachusetts
- Died: January 18, 1959 (aged 87); Berkeley, California
- Education: Mount Holyoke College (BS); Columbia University (MA, PhD)
- Scientific career
- Fields: Folkloristics; ethnography
- Workplaces: Vassar College
- Academic advisors: Franz Boas

Martha Warren Beckwith (January 19, 1871 – January 28, 1959) was an American folklorist and ethnographer who was the first chair in folklore at any university or college in the U.S.

== Early life and education ==
Beckwith was born in Wellesley Heights, Massachusetts, to George Ely and Harriet Winslow (née Goodale) Beckwith, both schoolteachers, before the family moved to Maui, Hawaii, where they had relatives descended from early missionaries. There, Beckwith made friends with many locals including members of the wealthy Alexander family who later sponsored her folklore work, and she developed an early interest in Hawaiian folk dancing.

Beckwith graduated from Mount Holyoke College with a Bachelor of Science degree in 1893 and returned to Hawaii, working as a teacher in Honolulu. She moved to Chicago in 1896 and began teaching English and Anthropology at the University of Chicago before taking a position as an English instructor at Elmira College the following year. After her father's death in 1898, Beckwith studied various languages, including Old English, French, and German, at Cambridge University and the University of Halle. She returned to the States and taught English at her alma mater.

Her formal education in anthropology did not begin till the 1900s, as her interests in Hawaiian folk customs and literature felt out of place in the English academic curriculum. In 1906, Beckwith obtained a Master of Arts degree in anthropology after studying under Franz Boas at Columbia University and completing a thesis on Hopi and Kwatiutl traditional dances. She received her Doctor of Philosophy from the same institution in 1918.

== Academic career ==
In 1909, Beckwith first joined the faculty at Vassar College as an instructor in the English Department, recommended by William Witherle Lawrence. She left Vassar in 1913 and returned to Hawaii, where she collected extensively on the islands' native folklore and mythology. In 1915, she took a position in the English Department at Smith College and began publishing on topics including hula and Tsimshian mythology. Her work was often in conversation with Boas' and hisTsimshian Mythology influenced her doctoral dissertation on the mythological figure Laieikawai. While Boas encouraged Beckwith to remain at Smith, she approached her childhood friend and noted naturalist, Annie Alexander, with her concerns about the lack of academic positions in folklore research; Alexander responded by proposing and anonymously funding the Folklore Foundation at Vassar College. In 1920, Beckwith was appointed as the chair of the Foundation, making her the first person to hold a chair in the field at any college or university in the United States. Under her direction, the Folklore Foundation published multiple monographs, often authored by alumnae, on Jamaican, Native American, and Hawaiian folklore. The Foundation also hosted lectures and meetings of the American Folklore Society. From 1932 to 1933, Beckwith served as the president of the American Folklore Society, and in 1934, was on the Committee for the National Folk Festival. Beckwith became a full professor in 1929 at Vassar and retired in 1938.

== Research and travel ==
Jamaica Anansi Stories

Beckwith conducted research in a variety of European and Middle Eastern countries but her most extensive research focused on Hawaii and Polynesia, Jamaica, and the Sioux tribes of North and South Dakota.

Beckwith carried out fieldwork in Jamaica between 1919 and 1922. Her publications on Jamaican folklore often included details on music recorded by Helen H. Roberts, who accompanied Beckwith to Jamaica in 1920 and 1921. Beckwith's research in culminated in Black Roadways: A Study of Jamaican Folklife (1929), one of the first folkloric studies of Black communities in the New World. The book is noted for presenting Black culture as a rational system and was the subject of an extended review in the Journal of American Folklore by Melville J. Herskovits, to which Beckwith responded. Although not an uncritical review, Herskovits – an anthropologist who specialised on Africa – praised Beckwith for her detailed descriptions of customs, so much so that "he felt able to identify some as not merely African in origin but specifically, say, as Yoruba or Ashanti". Her work largely focused on cultural and historical influences on folklore, rather than the racial or mental characteristics of the groups she studied.

Beckwith also studied her own community while at Vassar, working to collect folk songs from the descendants of Dutch settlers in the Hudson Valley as well as the beliefs and traditions of modern college women.

In 1926, Beckwith gathered folktales at the Pine Ridge Indian Reservation in South Dakota. She also spent several summers working with the Mandan-Hidatsa tribes on the Fort Berthold Reservation in North Dakota; Beckwith was adopted into the Hidatsa's Prairie Chicken Clan for her work translating the tribes' traditional stories. From 1926 to 1927, during a sabbatical year from Vassar, her fieldwork took her to Goa, where she worked among Portuguese settlers as part of travels that also took place in Italy, Greece, Palestine and Syria. These travels influenced her methodology and understanding of folklore studies as a discipline, which she outlined in Folklore in America (1931).

Beckwith's most recognised work was her studies of Hawaiian culture, including translations of creation chants and myths, drawing on the work of 19th century Hawaiian historians such as Kepelino and Samuel Kamakau. Her Hawaiian Mythology (1940) has been described as "representing more than thirty years of exhaustive research".

== Later life ==
Beckwith retired from Vassar in 1938 and relocated to Berkeley, California. She continued to research and publish as an Honorary Research Associate at the Bishop Museum, moving to Hawaii after the end of World War II. Her last years focused on work pertaining to Hawaiian herbal remedies, as well as translating the work of Hawaiian writers such as Kepelino and Samuel Kamakau. At the age of 80, she published her final major work on the Kumulipo, and though she suffered a stroke in 1951, she remained an editor for the Journal of American Folklore until the mid-1950s. Beckwith died on January 28, 1959, in Berkeley and is buried on Maui in Makawao Cemetery, which is also the final resting place of her parents, brother, sister, and childhood friend Annie Alexander.

== Selected bibliography ==
- Beckwith, Martha W. (1916). "The Hawaiian Hula-Dance". The Journal of American Folklore. 29 (113): 409–412. doi:10.2307/534686 ISSN 0021-8715.
- Beckwith, Martha Warren (1922). Folk-Games of Jamaica (with music recorded in the field by Helen H. Roberts). Poughkeepsie, N. Y.: Vassar College. OCLC10555685.
- Beckwith, Martha Warren (1923). "Signs and Superstitions Collected from American College Girls". The Journal of American Folklore. 36 (139): 1–15. doi:10.2307/535105 ISSN 0021-8715.
- Beckwith, Martha Warren (1923). Christmas Mummings in Jamaica (with music recorded in the field by Helen H. Roberts). Poughkeepsie, N.Y.: Vassar College. OCLC 47059596.
- Beckwith, Martha Warren (1923). Polynesian Analogues to the Celtic Other-World and Fairy Mistress Themes. New Haven, C.T.: Yale University Press. OCLC16327978.
- Beckwith, Martha Warren (1924). Jamaica Anansi Stories (with music recorded in the field by Helen Roberts). New York: American Folklore Society. OCLC2322187.
- Beckwith, Martha Warren (1924). 'The English Ballad in Jamaica: A Note upon the Origin of the Ballad Form'. Publications of the Modern Language Association, 39(2), 455–483. https://doi.org/10.2307/457194
- Beckwith, Martha Warren (1925). Jamaica Proverbs. Poughkeepsie, N.Y.: Vassar College. OCLC 4513341.
- Beckwith, Martha Warren (1927). Notes on Jamaican Ethnobotany. Poughkeepsie, N.Y.: Vassar College. OCLC 18484068.
- Beckwith, Martha Warren (1928). Jamaica Folk-Lore (with music recorded in the field by Helen H. Roberts). New York: American Folk-Lore Society. OCLC 312470569.
- Beckwith, Martha Warren (1929). Black Roadways: A Study of Jamaican Folk Life. Chapel Hill: University of North Carolina Press. OCLC 870469911.
- Beckwith, Martha Warren (1930). Myths and Hunting Stories of the Mandan and Hidatsa Sioux. Poughkeepsie, N.Y.: Vassar College. OCLC 3371330.
- Beckwith, Martha Warren (1930). "Mythology of the Oglala Dakota". The Journal of American Folklore. 43 (170): 339–442. doi:10.2307/535138 ISSN 0021-8715.
- Beckwith, Martha Warren (1937). Mandan-Hidatsa Myths and Ceremonies. New York: American Folk-Lore Society. OCLC 800851041.
- Beckwith, Martha Warren (1940). Hawaiian Mythology. New Haven, C.T.: Yale University Press, 1940. OCLC 316816993.
- Beckwith, Martha Warren (1948). "An Old Song". Western Folklore. 7 (2): 176–177. doi:10.2307/1497388 ISSN 0043-373X.
- Beckwith, Martha W. (1949). "Function and Meaning of the Kumulipo Birth Chant in Ancient Hawaii". The Journal of American Folklore. 62 (245): 290–293. doi:10.2307/537203 ISSN 0021-8715.
- Beckwith, Martha Warren (1951). The Kumulipo: A Hawaiian Creation Chant. Chicago: University of Chicago Press, 1951. OCLC 898842854.
