= Faumea =

Polynesian eel woman

Faumea is a figure in Polynesian mythology, specifically that of the Tuamotus archipelago of French Polynesia, where she is regarded as an "eel-woman". The sea god Tangaroa encounters her when he sails to her island. In addition to being an eel-woman, Faumea has eels within her vagina which eat men, reflecting the folk concept of vagina dentata. However, Faumea teaches Tangaroa how to lure the eels out and they have sex. Faumea bears Tangaroa two sons: Tu-Nui-Ka-Rere (also called Rata-Nui) and Turi-A-Faumea.

Later, Turi-A-Faumea's wife Hina-Arau-Riki is kidnapped by the octopus-demon Rogo-Tumu-Here. Faumea helps Tangaroa and their sons rescue Hina by holding the wind within "the sweat of her armpit" and then releasing it at Tangaroa's command to power their canoes.

American folklorist Martha Warren Beckwith recorded a similarity or possible relation to the fertility goddess Haumea.
