= Mele (Hawaiian term) =

Hawaiian term

- Cultural origins: Hawaii

Mele are chants, songs, or poems. The term comes from the Hawaiian language. It is frequently used in song titles such as "He Mele Lāhui Hawaiʻi", composed in 1866 by Liliʻuokalani as a national anthem. Hawaiian songbooks often carry the word in the book's title. Mele is a cognate of Fijian language meke.

In practical usage, the word can be combined with other words, such as Mele Hula, a metered chant. The word can either be a noun (He mele kēia), or used as a verb to mean "to chant" or "to sing" (E mele mai...).

The 1,255 recordings of Hawaiian chants and songs made by ethnomusicologist Helen Heffron Roberts 1923–1924 are cataloged at the Bishop Museum in Honolulu as individual meles. The museum database has a separate search category titled "Mele Index". The Kawaihuelani Center for Hawaiian Language at the University of Hawaiʻi at Mānoa teaches multiple classes on various aspects of mele.
