= Laplace affair =

French military intervention in Hawai'i

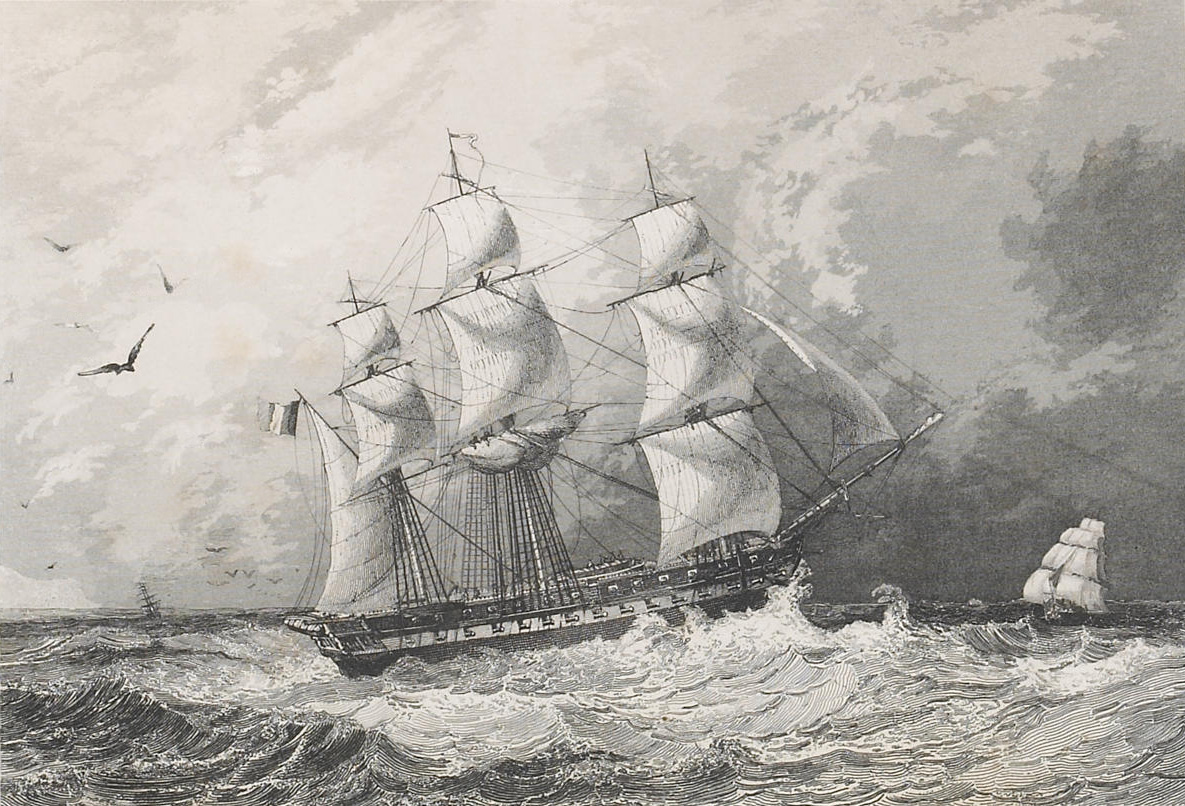
- L'Artémise
Date	July 10, 1839
Location	Kingdom of Hawaii 19.883°N 155.934°W
Result	Kamehameha III agrees to demands: Hawaii issues the Edict of Toleration July 17; Hawaii paid $20,000 in compensation.

Belligerents
(France) French Kingdom	Kingdom of Hawaii

Commanders and leaders
(France) Captain Laplace	(Hawaii) Kamehameha III

Strength
1 frigate 300 Marines	

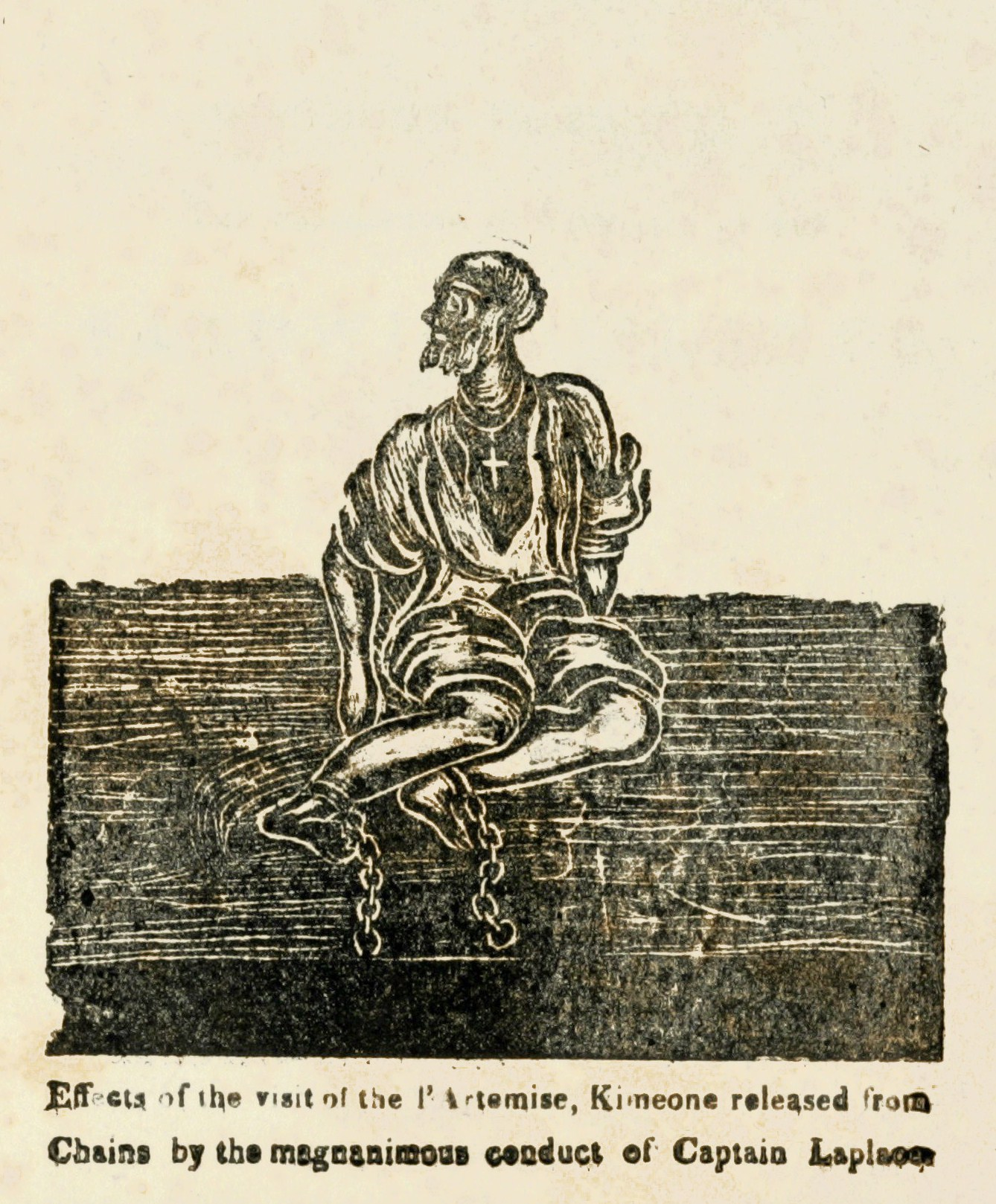
Effects of the visit of the 'L'Artemise,' Kimeone released from chains by the magnanimous conduct of Captain Laplace, woodcuts showing the persecution of Catholics in Hawaii, c. 1839.

The Laplace affair or the French Incident was a military intervention by the Kingdom of France in 1839 to end the persecution of Catholics in the Kingdom of Hawaii, which had been promoted by Protestant ministers. Under the threat of war, King Kamehameha III agreed to the French demands to stop the detention of Catholic citizens and pay reparations.

== Background ==
After the 1819 death of King Kamehameha of the Hawaiian Islands, queen regent Kaʻahumanu came to power, the powerful newly converted Protestant widow of Kamehameha the Great. New England Protestant ministers convinced her to illegalize Catholicism in Hawaii. Following the enactment of the new policy, chiefs loyal to her forcibly deported French Catholic priests on to the Waverly in Honolulu Harbor on December 24, 1831. Native Hawaiian Catholic converts were arrested and imprisoned. Most of these prisoners were released once Protestant ministers had beaten them into rejecting Catholicism. The prejudice against the French Catholics missionaries remained the same under the reign of her successor, the Kuhina Nui Kaʻahumanu II.

== Intervention ==
On July 10, 1839 Captain Laplace of the French frigate Artémise sailed to Hawaii under orders to:

Destroy the malevolent impression which you find established to the detriment of the French name; to rectify the erroneous opinion which has been created as to the power of France; and to make it well understood that it would be to the advantage of the chiefs of those islands of the Ocean to conduct themselves in such a manner as not to incur the wrath of France. You will exact, if necessary with all the force that is yours to use, complete reparation for the wrongs which have been committed, and you will not quit those places until you have left in all minds a solid and lasting impression.

== Agreement ==
Under the threat of war King Kamehameha III issued an Edict of Toleration on July 17, 1839 and paid the $20,000 in compensation for the deportation of the priests and the incarceration and torture of converts, agreeing to Laplace's demands. The kingdom proclaimed:

That the Catholic worship be declared free, throughout all the dominions subject to the king of the Sandwich Islands; the members of this religious faith shall enjoy in them the privileges granted to Protestants.

The Catholic missionaries returned unpersecuted and Kamehameha III donated land for them to build a church as reparation.
