= Rogo-Tumu-Here =

Rogo-Tumu-Here was an octopus demon from Tuamotu mythology. He attacked and swallowed Hina-Arau-Riki, the wife of Turi-A-Faumea, son of Tangaroa and Faumea, and was slain by the former males along with Tu-Nui-Ka-Rere.
