= Makawao Union Church =

Historic church in Hawaii, United States

- U.S. National Register of Historic Places
- Hawaiʻi Register of Historic Places
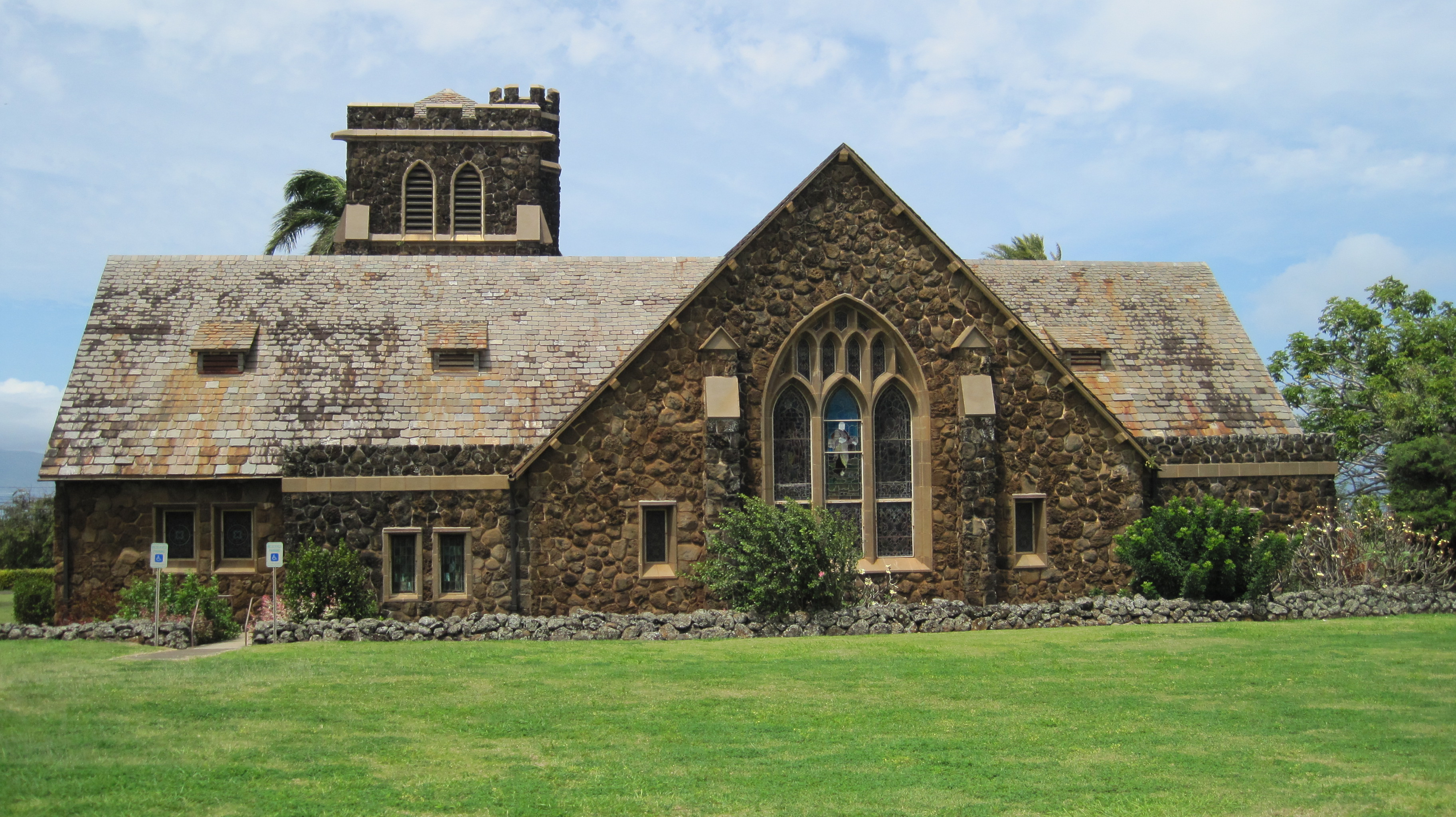
- South elevation in 2010

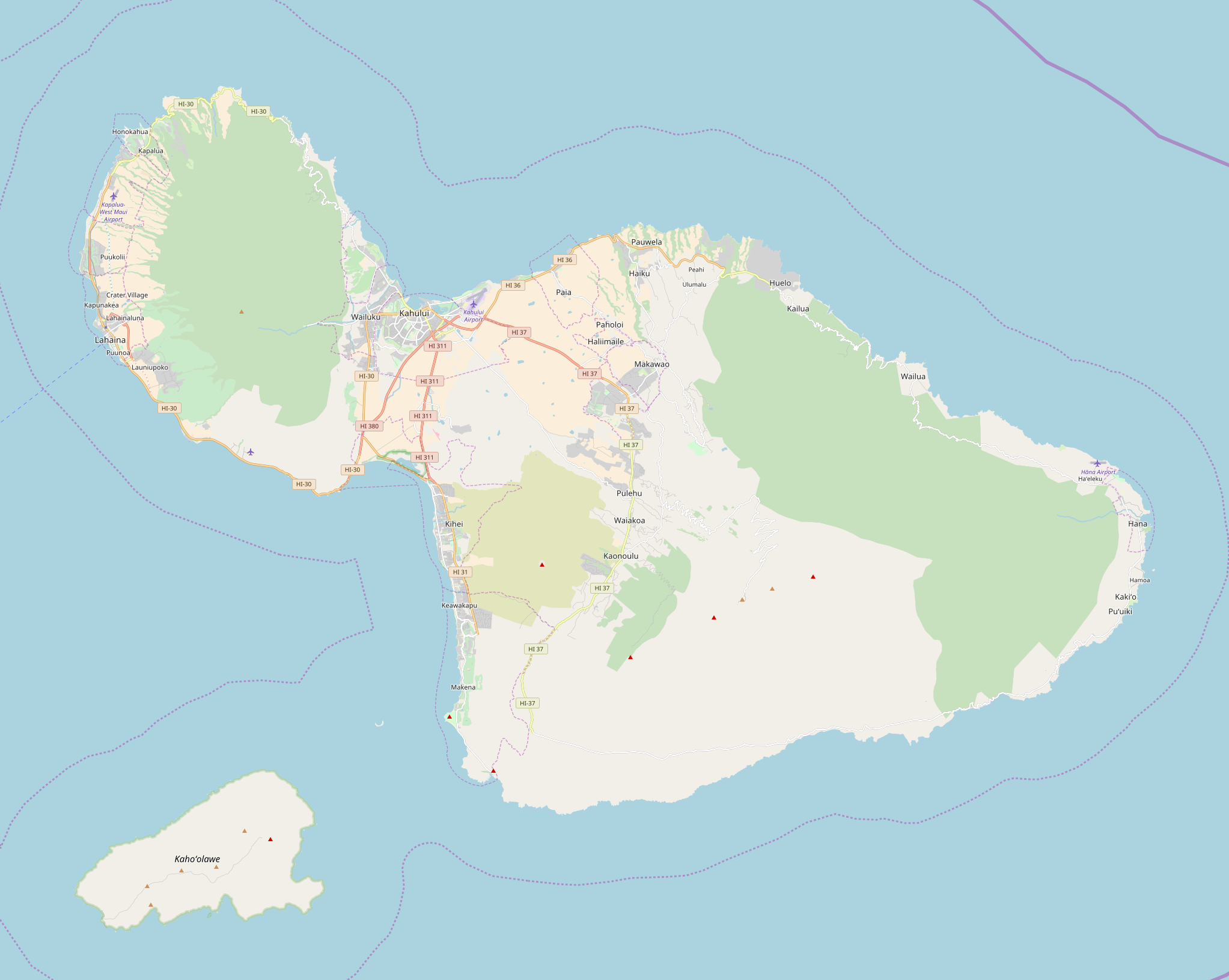
- Location within Maui Location within Hawaii
- Nearest city: Makawao, Hawaii, US
- Coordinates: 20°53′32″N 156°21′3″W
- Area: 1.7 acres (0.69 ha)
- Built: 1917
- Architect: C. W. Dickey
- Architectural style: Late Gothic Revival
- NRHP reference No.: 85003227
- HRHP No.: 50-50-05-01610

Significant dates
- Added to NRHP: December 17, 1985
- Designated HRHP: December 17, 1985

Makawao Union Church is a church near Makawao on the Hawaiian island of Maui. It was founded by New England missionary Jonathan Smith Green during the Kingdom of Hawaii. The third historic structure used by the congregation was designed by noted local architect C.W. Dickey and dedicated in 1917 as the Henry Perrine Baldwin Memorial Church. In 1985, Makawao Union Church was placed on the Hawaii and National Register of Historic Places.

== Wood-framed church ==
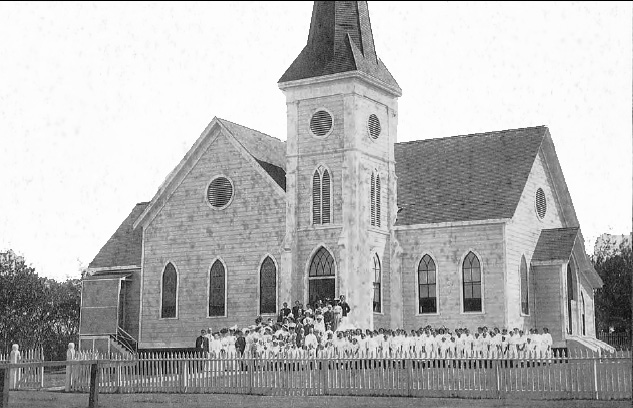
Wood-framed church in early 1900s

In 1870, Henry Perrine Baldwin his wife, Emily Alexander Baldwin, and their children joined the church. Henry served as organist for over forty years. Baldwin and his brother-in-law became wealthy co-founders of Alexander & Baldwin. On January 5, 1878, Rev. Green died; Asenath Green would maintain the church until she died in 1894, and then daughters Mary and Laura.

His son Joseph Porter Green (1833–1886) served at the church, and was elected to the legislature of the Hawaiian Kingdom in 1860.

In 1888, Baldwin offered the church a site for a new building, on the foundation of the former Paliuli Sugar Mill near what is now called Rainbow Gulch and Rainbow County Park. The mill was named after Pali uli (literally "green cliff"), the place in Hawaiian mythology roughly equivalent to the garden of Eden.

This church, a New England style white frame structure, was dedicated on March 10, 1889. The Pāʻia Community House, finished in hardwood on the inside, was built in 1914 adjacent to the church. The Community House, with its large auditorium and 40-foot (12 m) deep stage was used for plays, operettas, school graduations, concerts, lectures, silent movies and dances. The site of the old church, 20°51′42″N 156°18′46″W became the cemetery. Later the Maui Veteran's Cemetery was built adjacent to the church cemetery.

A native Hawaiian pastor John Kalama served at both Makawao and Poʻokela until his death in 1896. The original building stood until about 1900.

The "Daily Bulletin Newspaper, Honolulu Oct 2, 1889 pg3 Announced the purchase of a new pipe organ built for the church, by the NY firm of Roosevelt. A small organ of one manual/pedal & 6 speaking stops. This being purchased, by Baldwin while he was in New York, he paid a visit to the organ Company.

== Stone church ==
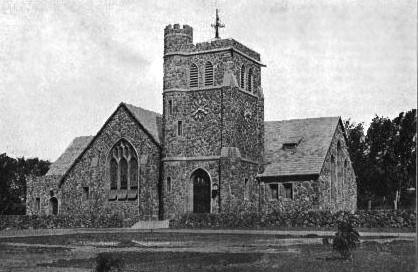
Stone church at dedication in 1917

The frame church was razed in 1916 and construction began immediately on a new Gothic Revival style structure. The new building was designed by architect Charles William Dickey (1871–1942), whose mother was Emily Baldwin's sister. It has been called "one of his more outstanding works." The stone church was dedicated September 2, 1917. It was about the same size as the frame building, and also used the original Paliuli Mill foundation. Henry Alexander Baldwin (known as "Harry"), Henry Perrine's son, was featured speaker, along with William Hyde Rice. The organ was donated in the memory of Harry Baldwin's sons Jared Smith Baldwin (1889–1914) and Leslie Alexander Baldwin (1898–1901).

The walls were built of reinforced concrete with native basalt lava rock veneer. The roof was covered in slate from Vermont. Four stained glass windows and the bell were reused from the old building. A Seth Thomas clock has three faces on the Norman style tower. The main entry is through oak doors in the tower.

Austin Craig Bowdish was pastor at the dedication. Augustine Jones became pastor in 1921. The 1938 Maui earthquake damaged the community house, but not the stone church.

On June 29, 1985, Makawao Union Church was placed on the Hawaii Register of Historic Places as site 50-05-1610, and December 17, 1985, it was listed on the National Register of Historic Places listings in Hawaii as site 85003227. It now calls itself an "interdenominational, community church with Congregational heritage". As of 2019 the pastor was Rev. Robin Lunn. The road past the church was named Baldwin Avenue for the Baldwin family. It is located at 1445 Baldwin Avenue, Makawao, Hawaii, 20°53′32″N 156°21′3″W.

== Burials ==
The church cemetery is located 3.9 miles southeast of the church, in the 3300 block of Baldwin Avenue (@20.861218,-156.311417.) Notable people buried there include the original missionary family: Theodosia Arnold Green, 1859, Jonathan Smith Green, 1878, and Ansenath Cargill Green, 1894. Harry Baldwin, 1946 was a Republican Politician, Annie Montague Alexander, 1950 an explorer and scientist. Others from the Alexander and Baldwin families are buried in the cemetery. James Dole, 1958 owned the largest pineapple plantation in the world. Anne Alexander, 1940, and Charles Henry Dickey, 1932 were parents of architect Charles William Dickey.

The Maui Veteran's Cemetery, near the church cemetery, holds the graves of two actors: horror movie actress Evelyn Ankers, 1985, and her husband Richard Denning, 1998, of Hawaii Five-O.

== Gallery ==
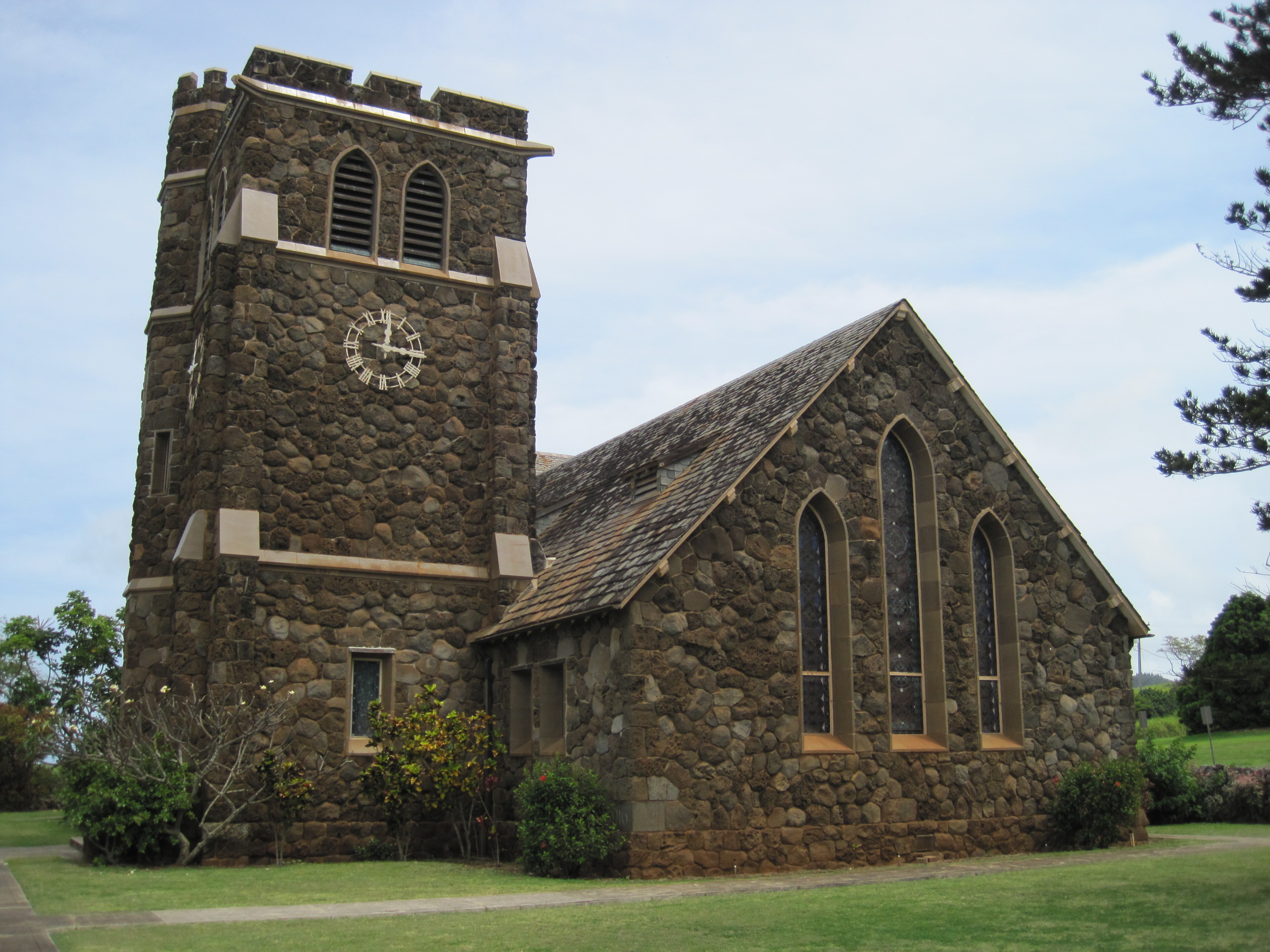
Northwest corner

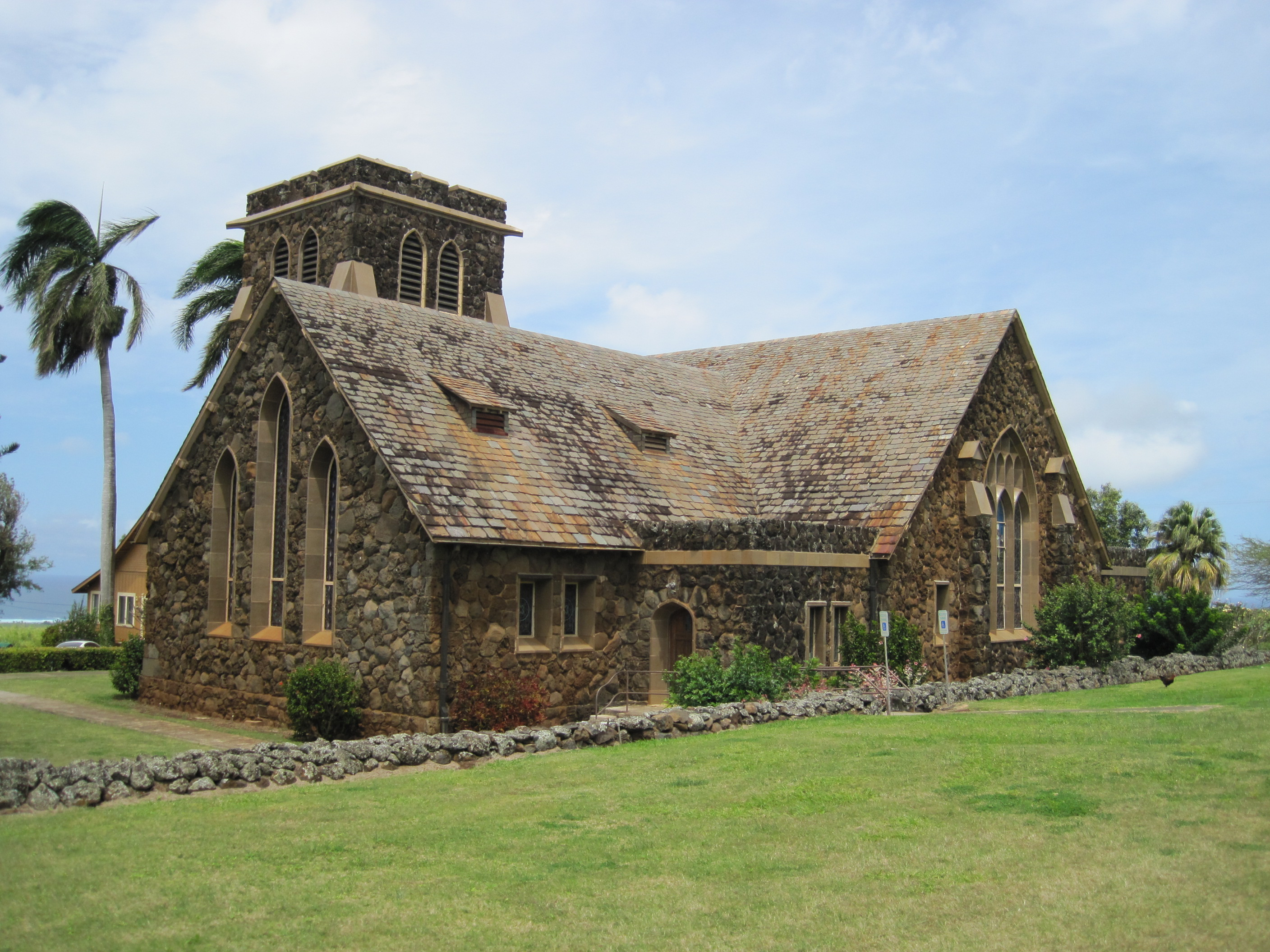
Southwest corner

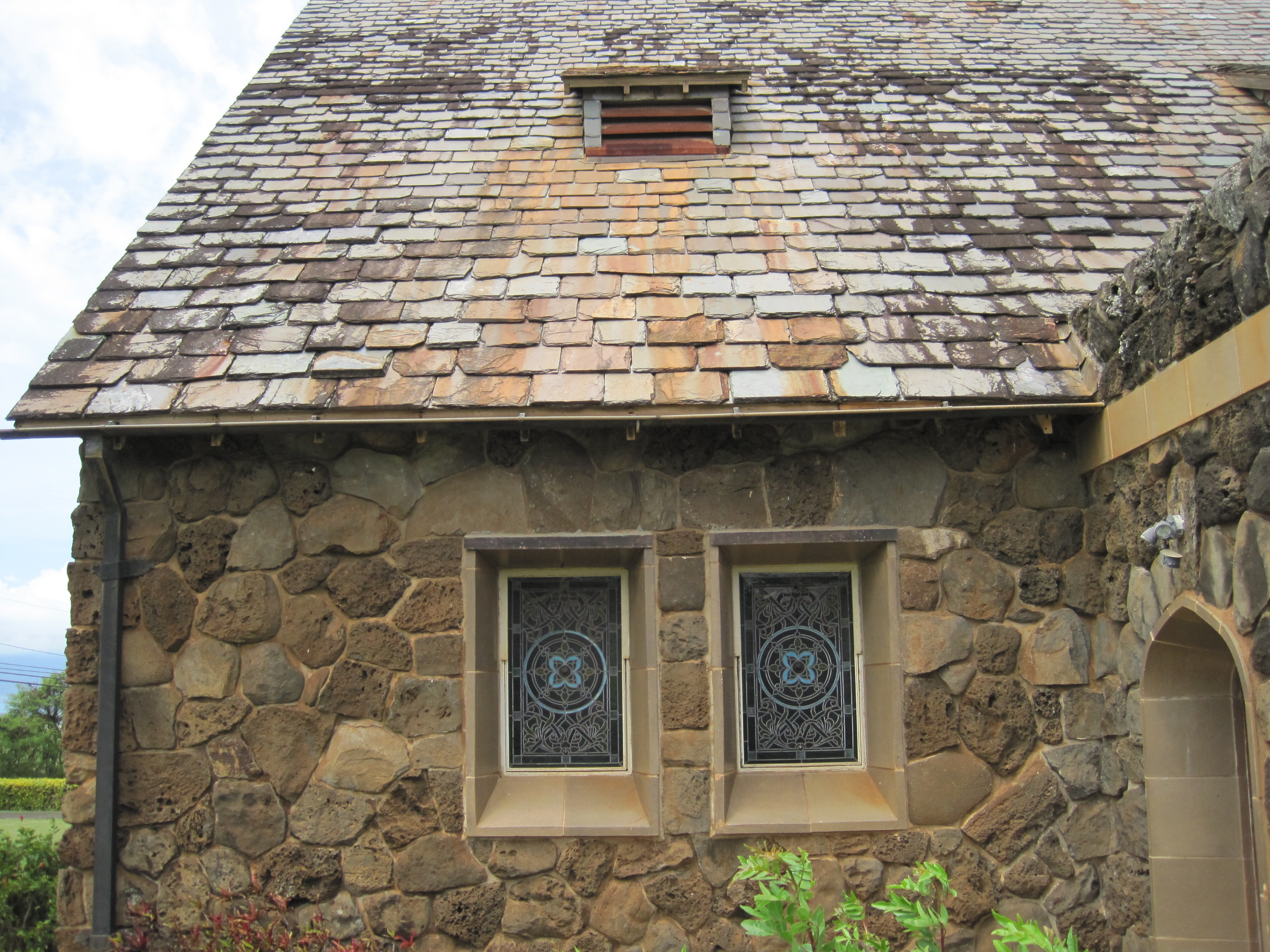
Roof slate

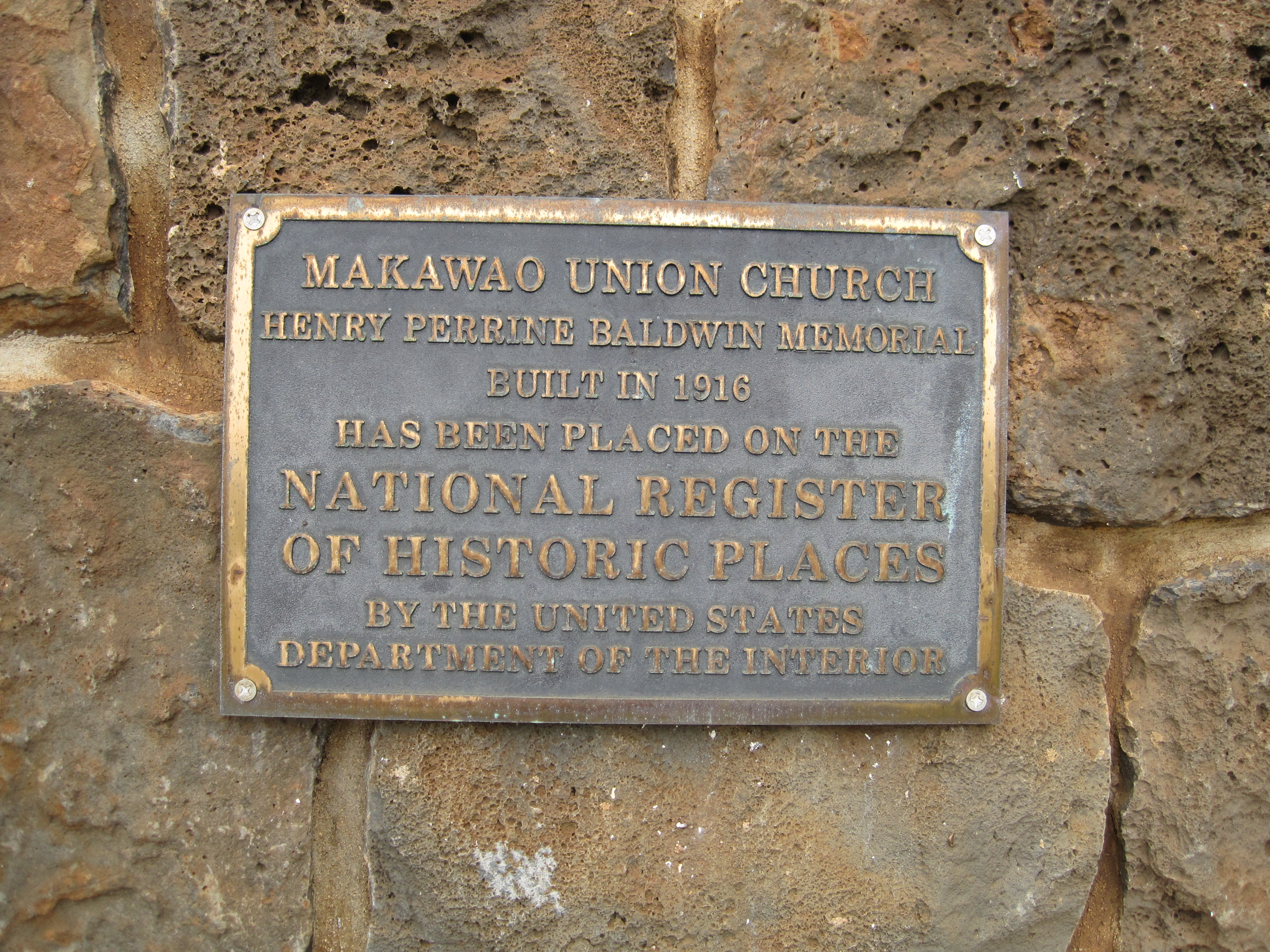
NRHP plaque

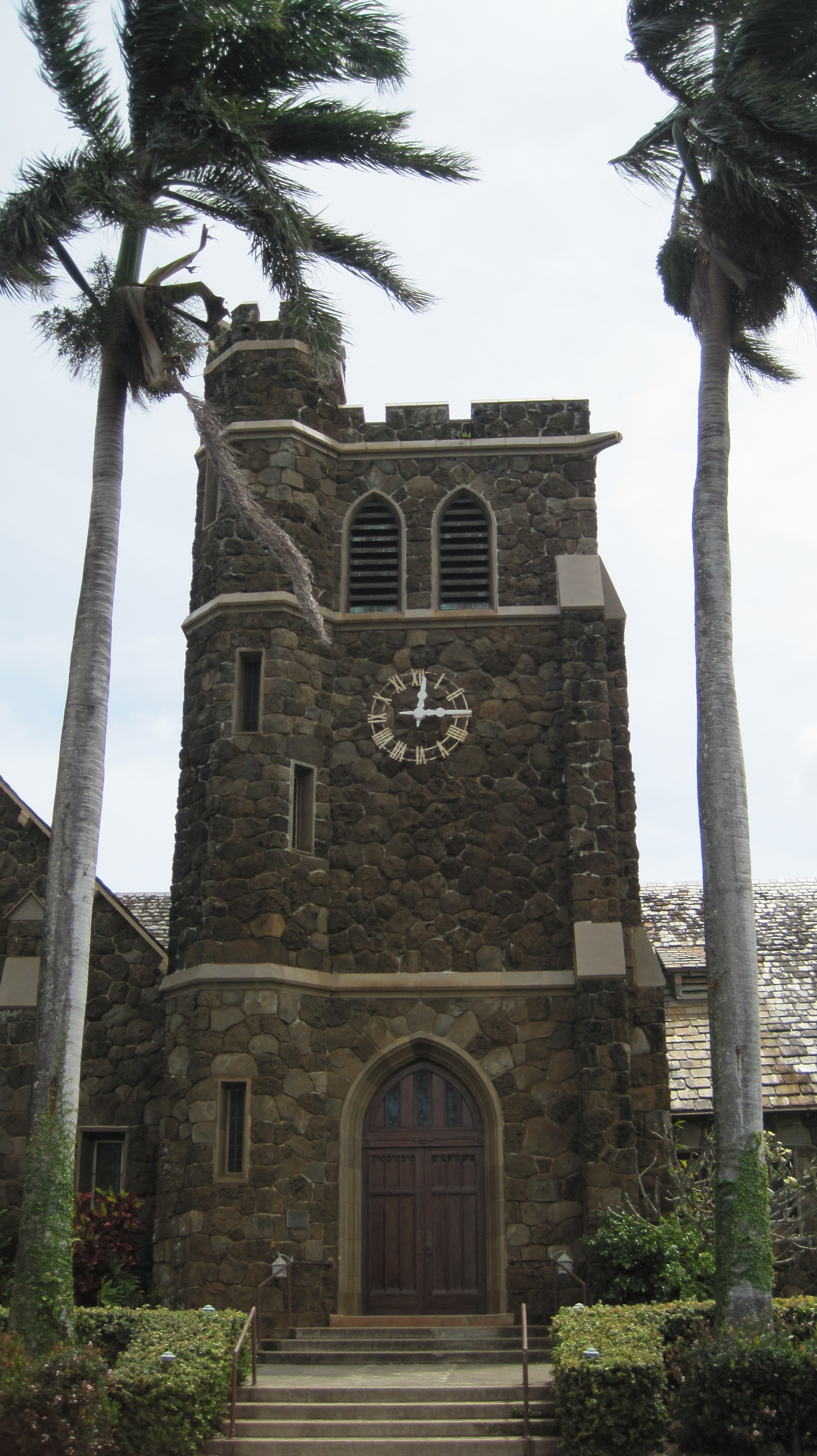
Bell tower

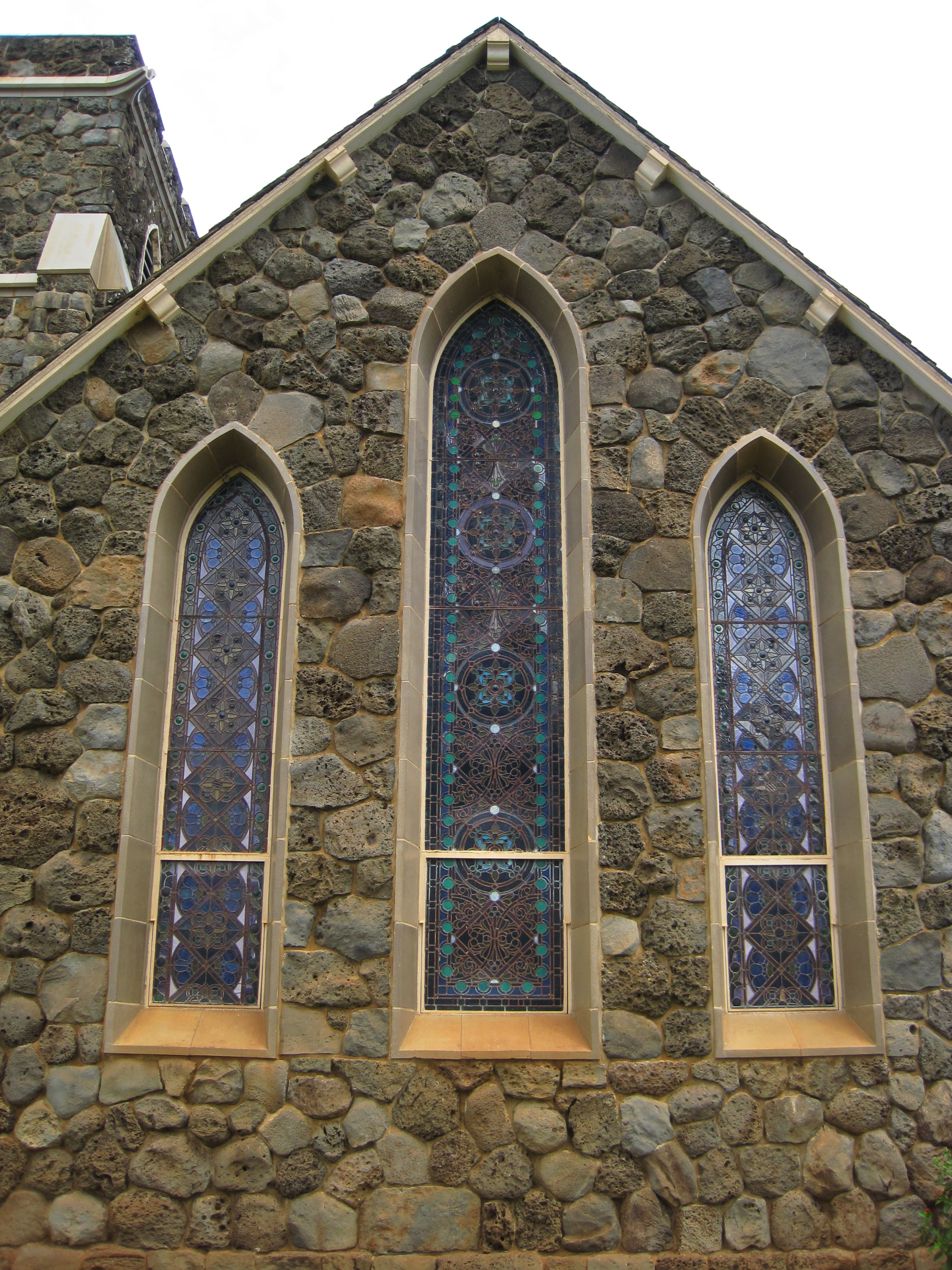
Stained glass windows in west side
