= Paliuli =

Legendary paradise in Hawaiian religion

In Hawaiian religion, Paliuli is the equivalent of the Garden of Eden, a legendary paradise and the home of Princess Laieikawai (Lāʻi.e.-i-ka-wai). It was used for several place names, including a sugar mill owned by Henry Perrine Baldwin.

The Makawao Union Church was built on its foundation.

Literally pali uli means "green cliff" in the Hawaiian language.

In another legend, Kū and Hinawelalani had three children: Kahanaiakeakua, Paliuli, and Keaomelemele. They were raised separately. Paliuli was raised by Waka in Paliuli, Puna, Hawaiʻi island.
