= Helen Heffron Roberts =

American ethnomusicologist (1888–1985)

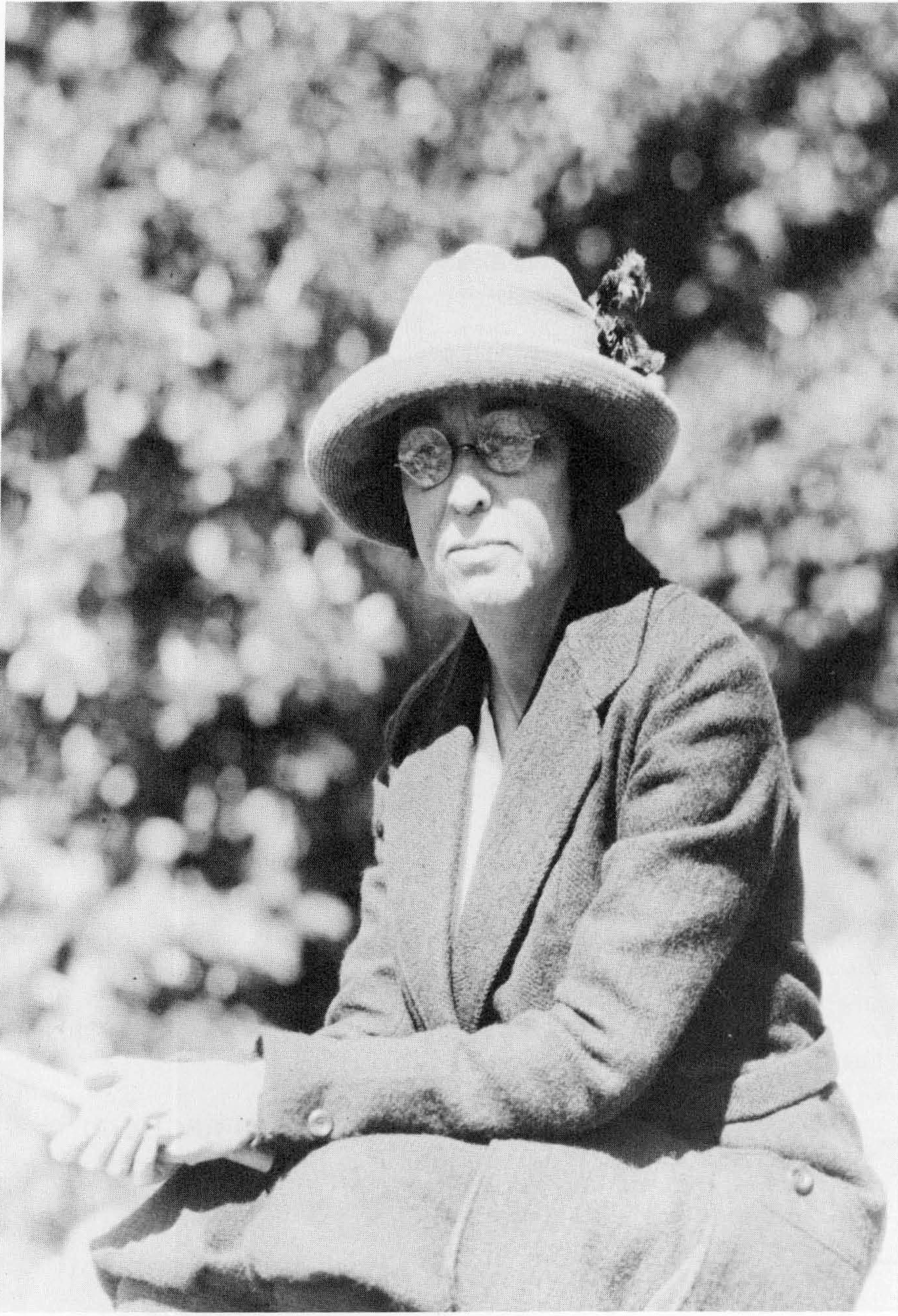
- Helen Heffron Roberts in CA, 1926, by J. P. Harrington. Likely shot during recording sessions of the now extinct Konomihu language in Somes Bar, CA.
- Born: June 12, 1888; Chicago, Illinois
- Died: March 26, 1985 (aged 96); North Haven, Connecticut
- Education: American Conservatory of Music, Columbia University
- Occupations: Anthropologist, ethnomusicologist

Helen Heffron Roberts (1888–1985) was an American anthropologist and pioneer ethnomusicologist. Her work included the study of the origins and development of music among the Jamaican Maroons, and the Puebloan peoples of the American southwest. Her recordings of ancient Hawaiian meles are archived at the Bernice P. Bishop Museum in Honolulu. Roberts was a protege of Alfred V. Kidder and Franz Boas.

== Early life and music background ==
She was born in Chicago on June 12, 1888, the oldest of three children born to accountant William Hinman Roberts and his wife, artist Dana Alma McDonald Roberts. Her parents provided piano lessons for her at an early age and encouraged her towards a career as a classical pianist. Upon the completion of her basic education at Monticello Seminary, Roberts furthered her studies, graduating from Chicago Musical College in 1909 and the American Conservatory of Music in 1911.

== Anthropological studies ==
While at the conservatory, Roberts began to realize that she did not have the abilities to achieve her parents' dream of becoming a classical pianist. Besides not having the hand dexterity, she had unspecified recurring health issues. In an interview in later years, she cited both her health and an early interest in Native American culture as the motivations for her travels to the southwestern United States. Over the next several years, her continued post graduate work at the conservatory was interspersed with employment as a music teacher in Kansas, Texas and Mexico, where she was often joined by family members.

Her archaeological interests also began during this time period, and she apprenticed under Alfred V. Kidder at his site excavations in Pecos, New Mexico. In 1916, she published "Doubling coiling" (pottery) in American Anthropologist. Berthold Laufer of Chicago's Field Museum of Natural History added his encouragement to that of Kidder who advised her to enroll at Columbia University. Under the tutelage of Franz Boas, known as the father of American anthropology, she changed her life goals from a career as either a music teacher or professional musician, to the study of the origins and progression of music in ethnic cultures. Boas advised her that as pioneer in the relatively new field of ethnomusicology she would have little competition.

By the time she received her 1919 M.A. degree in anthropology, her blended fields of interest were beginning to evidence themselves in her publications. She reviewed H. E. Krehbiel's book Afro-American Folksongs in 1917 for the Journal of American Folklore; and in 1918 with co-author Herman K. Haeberlin, published Some Songs of the Puget sound Salish in the Journal of American Folklore. During 1919 she did two reviews, Nabaloi Songs by C. R. Moss and A. L. Kroeber for American Anthropologist, and Teton Sioux Music by Frances Densmore for the Journal of American Folklore. Her master's thesis Coiled Basketry in British Columbia and Surrounding Region, written with Haeberlin and James A. Tiet, was published in 1928.

== Field work and transcriptions ==
Under the aegis of the American Association for the Advancement of Science and the Folklore Foundation at Vassar College, Roberts spent several months of 1920–1921 in Jamaica with foundation chair Martha Beckwith. Their collaborative efforts resulted in recordings and published works on Jamaican forklore. Beckwith published Folk-Games of Jamaica with music recorded in the field by Roberts in 1921. The pair also published Jamaica Anansi Stories in 1924. Roberts published Possible Survivals of African Song in Jamaica in 1926, that centers around the history and culture of the Jamaican Maroons.

The field work completed by Roberts in Hawaii during 1923 and 1924 produced the recording of 1,255 individual meles that are currently archived at the Bernice P. Bishop Museum in Honolulu. In 1926, Roberts recorded Ellen Brazill, in the remote northern California community of Somes Bar, singing a "Konomihu Lullaby". This wax cylinder recording can be heard at the American Folklife Center. Specifics of this recording session, part of a project to preserve the dying Shasta language, can be found in the Smithsonian National Anthropological Archive.

Her initial apprenticeship with Alfred V. Kidder served not only to change her career choice, but also provided a path to exploring her ongoing interest in Native American culture. In 1923, she published Chakwena Songs of Zuñi and Laguna in The Journal of American Folklore. She began doing field work among the Puebloan peoples in 1930, and an Alan Lomax 16mm video reel collection of American folk songs includes a Tewa dance that Roberts filmed in 1936 near San Ildefonso Pueblo, New Mexico. Artwork from San Ildefonso Pueblo collected at this time by Roberts can be found in the collection of the National Museum of the American Indian.

In between field assignments, Roberts collaborated with several professionals with whom she would be associated for most of her life. Clark Wissler and Jesse Walter Fewkes involved her with their work on Pawnee music, and it was for Edward Sapir that she transcribed the Diamond Jenness collection of Songs of the Nootka Indians of Western Vancouver Island. In 1924, she accepted a Yale University staff position at the request of Wissler who was helping spearhead a new project funded by the Rockefeller Foundation. Sapir became her supervisor at Yale in 1931, where she would remain until 1936.

Edwin Grant Burrows, after two years on the staff of Honolulu's Bernice P. Bishop Museum, arrived at Yale in 1933 to work on both his M.A. and Ph.D. anthropology degrees, and according to Roberts came under her mentorship. Her professional work and associations for Yale took her to Europe where she formed a lifelong friendship with Beatrice Blackwood.

A 1934 grant from the Carnegie Corporation of New York provided for her procurement of specially designed recording equipment to facilitate her Yale project of copying wax cylinder recordings to aluminum discs. Additionally, Roberts became a collector of wax cylinders recorded by other researchers in her field. She eventually donated 400 such wax cylinder recordings to the permanent collection of the Archive of Folk Culture at the Library of Congress.

Along with musicologist and composer Charles Seeger, composer Henry Cowell, ethnomusicologist George Herzog and Dorothy Lawton of the New York Public Library, Roberts was a founding member of the American Society for Comparative Musicology in 1933, the parent organization of the American Library of Musicology (ALM). Seeger envisioned the short-lived ALM as a publisher of music-related resources, but it ceased to exist by 1936.

== Later life ==
Roberts moved to Tryon, North Carolina, in part to care for her father, after a 1935 funding slash eliminated her position at Yale. In this small southern environment, she learned to grow her own food and became an accomplished horticulturist. During World War II, Roberts joined other Tryon women in cooking and canning foods to be sent to Europe. After her father's death, Roberts relocated to New Haven, Connecticut in 1945 where she spent the rest of her life. She became a member of the Horticultural Society of New York and sat on the Board of Directors of the New Haven Symphony Orchestra. While serving on that Board, Roberts co-wrote (with Doris Cousins) "A History of the New Haven Symphony Orchestra Celebrating its Seventh-Fifth Season". She died on March 26, 1985, and the bulk of her records are at the repository of the Sterling Memorial Library at Yale. Roberts estate established the Helen Roberts Trust, which underwrites a free performance on the New Haven Green by the New Haven Symphony Orchestra each summer. In recent years, the Symphony has performed with William Boughton, Cirque Mechanics, Kurt Elling, Jimmy Green, Alasdair Neale, Dianne Reeves, Amir ElSaffar's Rivers of Sound, and Tiempo Libre in concerts celebrating Helen Robert's musical legacy in the New Haven community.

== Sound recordings ==
Partial listing

- Harrington, John Peabody (1916–1917). John Peabody Harrington collection of Southern Valley Yokuts cylinder recordings (AFC 1981/024) (Cylinder). Washington, D.C.: Archive of Folk Culture, American Folklife Center, Library of Congress. LCCN 2015655229. (Note: Recorded by John Peabody Harrington and his wife Carobeth Harrington Laird in 1916–1917. Transcribed and analyzed by Roberts in 1921.)
- Beckwith, Martha (1920). Martha Beckwith collection of Jamaican cylinder recordings (AFC 1937/014) (Cylinder). Washington, D.C.: Archive of Folk Culture, American Folklife Center, Library of Congress. LCCN 2014655365. (Note: Recorded for Beckwith by Roberts. Donated to the Library by Roberts on February 21, 1937.)
- Roberts, Helen Heffron (1923). Helen Heffron Roberts collection of Hawaiian cylinder recordings (AFC 1936/003) (Cylinder). Washington, D.C.: Archive of Folk Culture, American Folklife Center, Library of Congress. LCCN 2015655314.
- Roberts, Helen Heffron (1926). Helen Heffron Roberts collection of Karuk and Konomihu cylinder recordings (AFC 1936/002) (Cylinder). Washington, D.C.: Archive of Folk Culture, American Folklife Center, Library of Congress. LCCN 2013655300.
- Roberts, Helen Heffron (1926). Helen Heffron Roberts collection of Round Valley cylinder recordings (AFC 1937/020) (Cylinder). Washington, D.C.: Archive of Folk Culture, American Folklife Center, Library of Congress. LCCN 2015655321.
- Roberts, Helen Heffron (1926). Helen Heffron Roberts collection of Luiseño cylinder recordings (AFC 1937/018) (Cylinder). Washington, D.C.: Archive of Folk Culture, American Folklife Center, Library of Congress. LCCN 2015655316.
- Roberts, Helen Heffron (1926). Helen Heffron Roberts collection of Konkow cylinder recordings (AFC 1937/012) (Cylinder). Washington, D.C.: Archive of Folk Culture, American Folklife Center, Library of Congress. LCCN 2013655529.
- Roberts, Helen Heffron (1928). Helen Heffron Roberts collection of Hopi Pueblo cylinder recordings (AFC 1979/104) (Cylinder). Washington, D.C.: Archive of Folk Culture, American Folklife Center, Library of Congress. LCCN 2014655319.
- Roberts, Helen Heffron (1929). Helen Heffron Roberts collection of Acoma Pueblo cylinder recordings (AFC 1979/103) (Cylinder). Washington, D.C.: Archive of Folk Culture, American Folklife Center, Library of Congress. LCCN 2014655318.
- Roberts, Helen Heffron (1929). Helen Heffron Roberts collection of Cochiti, San Ildefonso, Santa Clara, Tesuque, and Taos cylinder recordings (AFC 1979/102) (Cylinder). Washington, D.C.: Archive of Folk Culture, American Folklife Center, Library of Congress. LCCN 2014655317.
- Roberts, Helen Heffron (1929). Helen Heffron Roberts cylinder recordings of cowboy songs (AFC 1937/017) (Cylinder). Washington, D.C.: Archive of Folk Culture, American Folklife Center, Library of Congress. LCCN 2015655315.
- Roberts, Helen Heffron; LaVigna, Maria; McAllester, David P. (1979). Helen Heffron Roberts oral history interview conducted by Maria LaVigna and David P. McAllester (AFC 1979/095) (sound tape reels). Washington, D.C.: Archive of Folk Culture, American Folklife Center, Library of Congress. LCCN 2013655486.
- McClintock, Walter (1984). Walter McClintock collection of Blackfoot cylinder recordings (Set 2) (AFC 1937/019) (Cylinder). WBooksashington, D.C.: Archive of Folk Culture, American Folklife Center, Library of Congress. LCCN 2015655320.

== Publications ==
Partial listing

- Roberts, Helen H. (April–June 1917). "Review H. E. Krehbiel". The Journal of American Folklore. 30 (116). American Folklore Society: 278–279. doi:10.2307/534351. JSTOR 534351.
- Roberts, Helen H.; Haeberlin, Herman K. (October–December 1918). "Some Songs of the Puget sound Salish". The Journal of American Folklore. 31 (122). American Folklore Society: 496–520. doi:10.2307/535058. JSTOR 535058.
- Roberts, Helen H. (October–December 1919). "Nabaloi Songs by C. R. Moss; A. L. Kroeber". American Anthropologist. New Series, Vol. 21, No. 4 (4). Wiley on behalf of the American Anthropological Association: 452–459. doi:10.1525/aa.1919.21.4.02a00140. JSTOR 660575.
- Roberts, Helen H. (October–December 1919). "Teton Sioux Music by Frances Densmore". The Journal of American Folklore. 32 (126). American Folklore Society: 523–535. doi:10.2307/535192. JSTOR 535192.
- Roberts, Helen H. (July–September 1922). "Three Jamaican Folk-Stories". The Journal of American Folklore. 35 (137). American Folklore Society: 328–329. doi:10.2307/535009. JSTOR 535009.
- Beckwith, Martha Warran (1923). Christmas Mummings in Jamaica, by Martha Warren Beckwith, with Music Recorded in the Field by Helen H. Roberts. Poughkeepsie, N.Y: Vassar College. LCCN 24002162.
- Roberts, Helen H. (April–June 1923). "Chakwena Songs of Zuñi and Laguna". The Journal of American Folklore. 36 (140). American Folklore Society: 177–184. doi:10.2307/535214. JSTOR 535214.
- Roberts, Helen Heffron; Diamond, Jenness (1925). Songs of the Copper Eskimos. Ottawa: F. A. Acland. LCCN ltf96000074.
- Roberts, Helen H. (July 1926). "Possible Survivals of African Song in Jamaica". The Musical Quarterly. 12 (3). Oxford University Press: 340–358. doi:10.1093/mq/xii.3.340. hdl:2027/uc1.b4440340. JSTOR 738243.
- Roberts, Helen Heffron (1928). Ancient Hawaiian Music. Honolulu, HI: Bernice Pauahi Bishop Museum. LCCN 27013067.
- O'Neale, Lila M. (April 1930). "Review, Coiled Basketry in British Columbia and Surrounding Region by H. K. Haeberlin; James A. Tiet; Helen H. Roberts". American Anthropologist. New Series, Vol. 32, No. 2 (2). Wiley on behalf of the American Anthropological Association: 306–308. doi:10.1525/aa.1930.32.2.02a00100. JSTOR 661314.
- Beckwith, Martha Warran; Roberts, Helen Heffron (1924). Jamaica Anansi Stories. New York, N.Y: The American Folk-lore Society. LCCN 26010368.
- Beckwith, Martha Warran; Roberts, Helen Heffron (1928). Jamaica Folk-lore. New York, N.Y: The American Folk-lore Society, G. E. Stechert & Co. LCCN 30018643.
- Roberts, Helen Heffron (1929). Basketry of the San Carlos Apache. New York, NY: American Museum of Natural History. LCCN 30024590.
- Roberts, Helen H. (January–March 1932). "Melodic Composition and Scale Foundations in Primitive Music". American Anthropologist. New Series, Vol. 34, No. 1 (1). Wiley on behalf of the American Anthropological Association: 79–107. doi:10.1525/aa.1932.34.1.02a00060. JSTOR 660930.
- Roberts, Helen Heffron (1933). Form in Primitive Music; an analytical and comparative study of the melodic form of some ancient southern California Indian songs. New York, NY: American Library of Musicology, W. W. Norton. LCCN 33017404.
- Roberts, Helen Heffron (1936). Musical Areas in Aboriginal North America. New Haven, CT: Yale University Press. LCCN 37010591.
- Roberts, Helen Heffron (1955). Songs of the Nootka Indians of Western Vancouver Island. Philadelphia, PA: American Philosophical Society. LCCN 55005919.
- Roberts, Helen Heffron (1969). A History of the New Haven Symphony Orchestra Celebrating its Seventy-fifth Season, 1894–1969. New Haven, CT: Yale University Press. LCCN 76007393.
- Roberts, Helen Heffron (1970). Musical Areas in Aboriginal North America. New Haven, CT: Human Relations Area Files Press. LCCN 76118245.
- Roberts, Helen Heffron (1980). Concow-Maidu Indians of Round Valley—1926. Chico, CA: Association for Northern California Records and Research. LCCN 80111878.
- Harrngton, John P.; Roberts, Helen Heffron; Weigle, Marta (1989). Indian tales from Picuris Pueblo. Santa Fe, NM: Ancient City Press. LCCN 88072051.
- Special Bibliography – Six page bibliography 1967 from Ethnomusicology, Vol. 11, No. 2, May, on JStor.

== Misc ==
- Roberts, Helen Heffron (1913). Barnes collection of East African cylinder recordings (AFC 1937/015) (Cylinder). Washington, D.C.: Archive of Folk Culture, American Folklife Center, Library of Congress. LCCN 2014655364. (Note: Possibly recorded by James Barnes. Donated to the Library of Congress in 1937 by Helen Heffren Roberts.)
- Crampton, Henry Edward (1916). Henry Edward Crampton collection of Polynesian cylinder recordings (AFC 1937/016) (Cylinder). Washington, D.C.: Archive of Folk Culture, American Folklife Center, Library of Congress. LCCN 2014655367. (Note: Donated to the Library of Congress in 1937 by Helen Heffren Roberts.)
- Lomax, Alan (1936). Archive of American Folk Song films, 1936–1942, a collection of amateur films made by Alan Lomax and others (AFC 1990/017) (16 mm). Washington, D.C.: Archive of Folk Culture, American Folklife Center, Library of Congress. LCCN 2015655354. (Note: Included in the footage is a Tewa dance recorded by Roberts near San Ildefonso Pueblo, New Mexico.)
- Charlotte J. Frisbie (1989), Helen Heffron Roberts (1888–1985): A Tribute, Ethnomusicology, Vol. 33, No. 1 (Winter, 1989), pp. 97–111

== See also ==
- Linstead Market
