= Laieikawai =

Princess in Hawaiian religion

In Hawaiian religion, Laʻieikawai (Lāʻi.e.-i-ka-wai) and her twin sister Laʻielohelohe were princesses, and were born in Lāʻie, Oʻahu.

They were separated and hidden away from their chiefly father who had all his daughters killed at birth, because he wanted a first-born son. Laʻieikawai was hidden in a cave which was only accessed by diving in pool of water named Waiapuka. Soon it was well known that someone of royalty resided nearby because of the tell-tale rainbow that graced the sky above her cave dwelling.

Her grandmother Waka secretly tried to smuggle her to Paliuli, Puna, Hawaiʻi island. On the way there others heard of her beauty and the rumors travelled all throughout the islands. Aiwohikupua, a chief from the island of Kauaʻi, decided he would pursue her. At her home in Paliuli, Laieikawai was attended by supernatural birds such as the ʻiʻiwi polena. It is said she could float on the wings of the birds.

While other royalty in Hawaiʻi had mere feather capes and cloaks, Laʻieikawai had a house made of the sacred feathers. After a series of misfortunes, she becomes known as Kawahineliula ("woman of the twilight").

In 1863, S. N. Haleʻole published the story of the figure in The Hawaiian Romance of Laieikawai, the first fictional work of literature produced by a Native Hawaiian.
