= Rock veneer =

Geomorphic formation

A rock veneer is a geomorphic formation in which rock fragments (clasts) of gravel or cobble size form a thin cover over a surface or hillslope. Rock veneers are typically one or two clasts thick and may partially or fully cover the ground surface. Veneers typically form in semiarid and arid regions where chemical weathering rates and the potential for mass wasting are low. Other names for a rock veneer are rock-fragment cover (RFC), stone pavement, desert pavement, stony mantle, hammada and reg.

== Formation ==
Rock veneers commonly arise from the weathering of resistant rocks of quartzite, felsic granites, coarse granites, and dense basalts. As these larger rocks are deposited on a surface, smaller sands either are removed by wind or water erosion, or settle and form a fine-grained layer beneath the larger veneer rocks. The larger clasts then rearrange and settle to form the rock veneer.

Rock veneers form a variety of ways, with two major types; in situ veneers form in place by means of weathering, fluvial erosion, deflation (the removal of loose, fine-grained particles) or accretion; other veneers are transported via soil creep, sheet flooding or gully gravure (described below). Rock veneers are typically distinguished through six variables: particle size, particle density, stability characteristics, potential for storing mobile sediments, degree of abrasion, and varnishing.

=== Gully gravure ===
Gully gravure is a transportation process by which rock veneers can be formed. Valleys formed of gullies and rills are made and coarse rock fragments are deposited in side channels. As the side channels fill in, water forms new, less resistant channels down the borders of the coarse channels and finer gullies and rills. These channels build up, and the process happens again, resulting in a reversal of rills and gullies, with coarser clasts on the surface.

=== Root throw ===
Root throw is the process that occurs when a tree topples, raising its rootwad and the rock fragments in it. Fine sediment falls back into the rootwad pit or travels downstream, but coarse sediments form a local rock veneer around the rootwad. This local rock veneer is larger than the pit of the rootwad, as falling clasts extend the area of veneer. In a study of rootwads in Westcliffe, Colorado, it was estimated that root throw could have created a rock veneer over 90% of the surface during the Holocene.

Root throw produces a rock veneer when there are a large number of clasts near the surface, where there are: a slow rate of chemical weathering, insufficient precipitation to move the large clasts, high velocity winds, conditions favorable to shallow-rooted trees, and trees large enough to embed coarse rock in their roots.

== Effects ==
Hillslopes with a rock veneer are more stable than those without and have lower erosion rates. Rock veneers form a rocky armor on the hillslope which prevents the erosion of smaller sediments and stabilizes the slope. Rock veneers, forming when influx and outflux sediment rates are equal, indicate a hillslope in equilibrium, partly due to their protective cover on the slope. Erosion rates on veneered hillslopes are low to moderate.
