= Cyrille Pierre Théodore Laplace =

French explorer (1793–1875)

- Born: 7 November 1793; At sea
- Died: 24 January 1875 (aged 81); Brest, France
- Occupation: Naval Captain

Cyrille Pierre Théodore Laplace (7 November 1793 – 24 January 1875) was a French navigator famous for his circumnavigation of the globe on board La Favorite. He was pivotal in the opening of French trade in the Pacific and was instrumental in the establishment of the Hawaiian Catholic Church. He achieved the rank of captain.

== Early life ==
Laplace was born at sea on 7 November 1793. He joined the French Navy and fought in the Indian and Atlantic Oceans, along with battles in the West Indies. He was promoted from Aspirant to Ship-of-the-Line Lieutenant in 1823, and to Frigate Captain in 1828. He had been awarded he Cross of Saint-Louis in 1825. He, at some point, was in command of a schooner in Gorée, Senegal.

== Voyage of La Favorite ==
As British, American and Dutch voyages began solidifying their interests in Australia, Hawaii and New Guinea, the French government sought to secure the religious freedoms and rights of French residents in the South Pacific. Voyages such as that of Jules Dumont d'Urville in the 1820s had already collected vast amounts of knowledge of the area, and the French government were hoping to secure its economic opportunities. Having sent out two voyages already, that of the Astrolabe and the Bayonnaise, the French began drawing plans for a third expedition. The original route planned was designed to complement that of Hyacinthe de Bougainville, re-establishing French influence on the Indo-China area. Laplace's prime objective was to re-establish French influence in Indo-China, to "show the flag" in the area. He was also asked to gather information that may be of use to merchants, such as customs, harbour regulations, conditions of entry and market information. On 30 December 1829, Laplace departed Toulon with a crew of 177 aboard La Favorite.

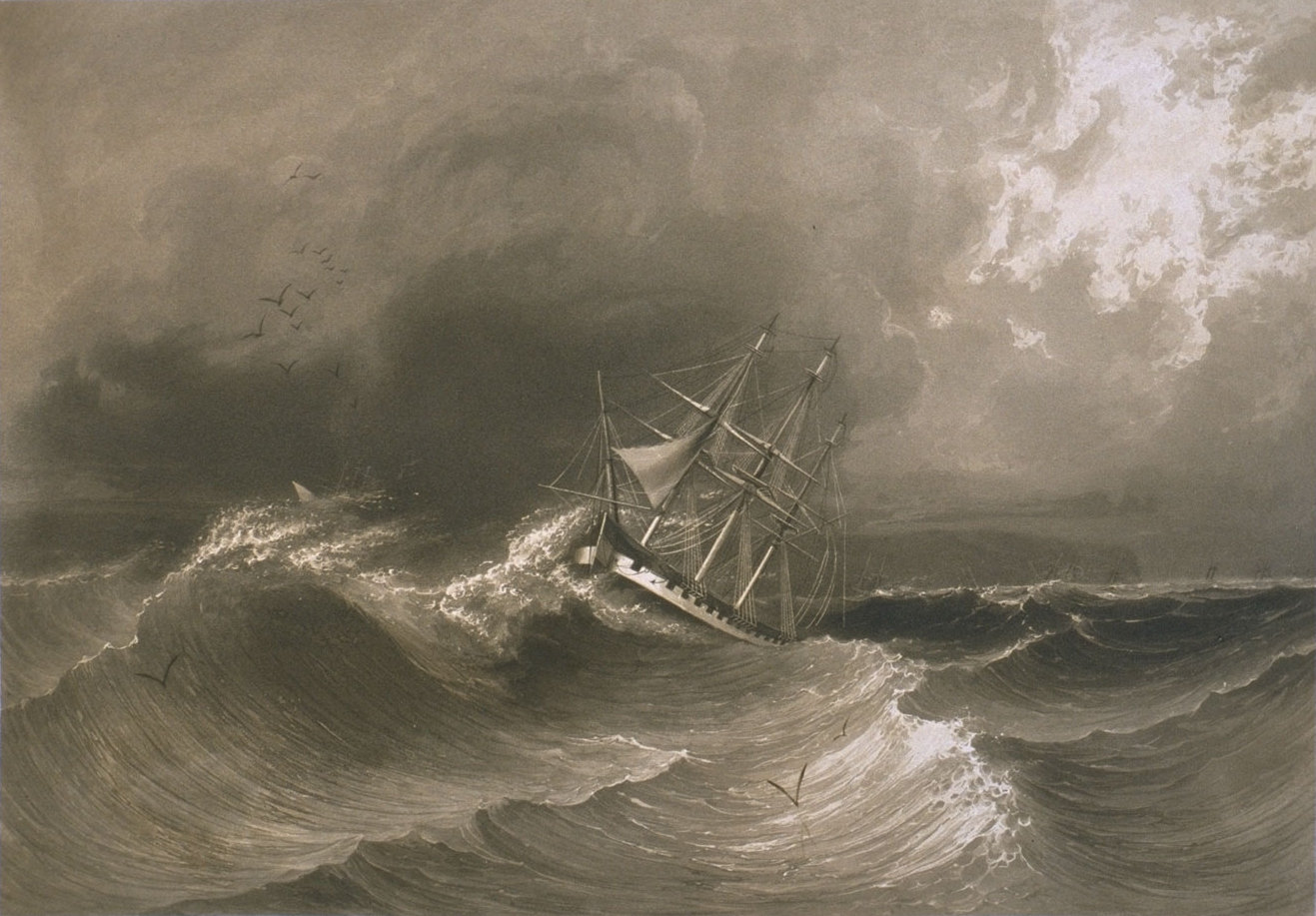
La Favorite under sail for Bourbon at the approach of the second hurricane.

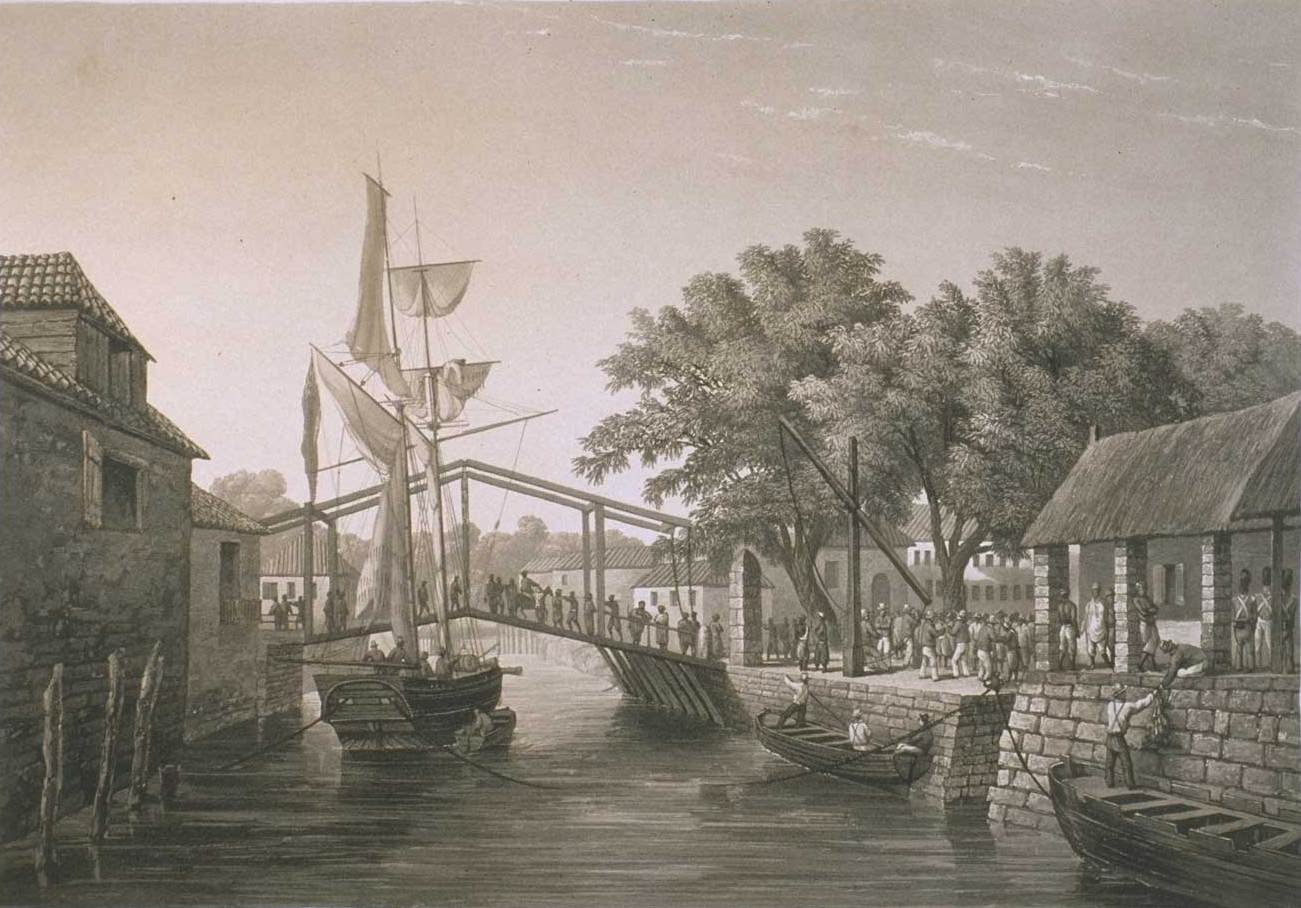
Landing-place at Malacca.

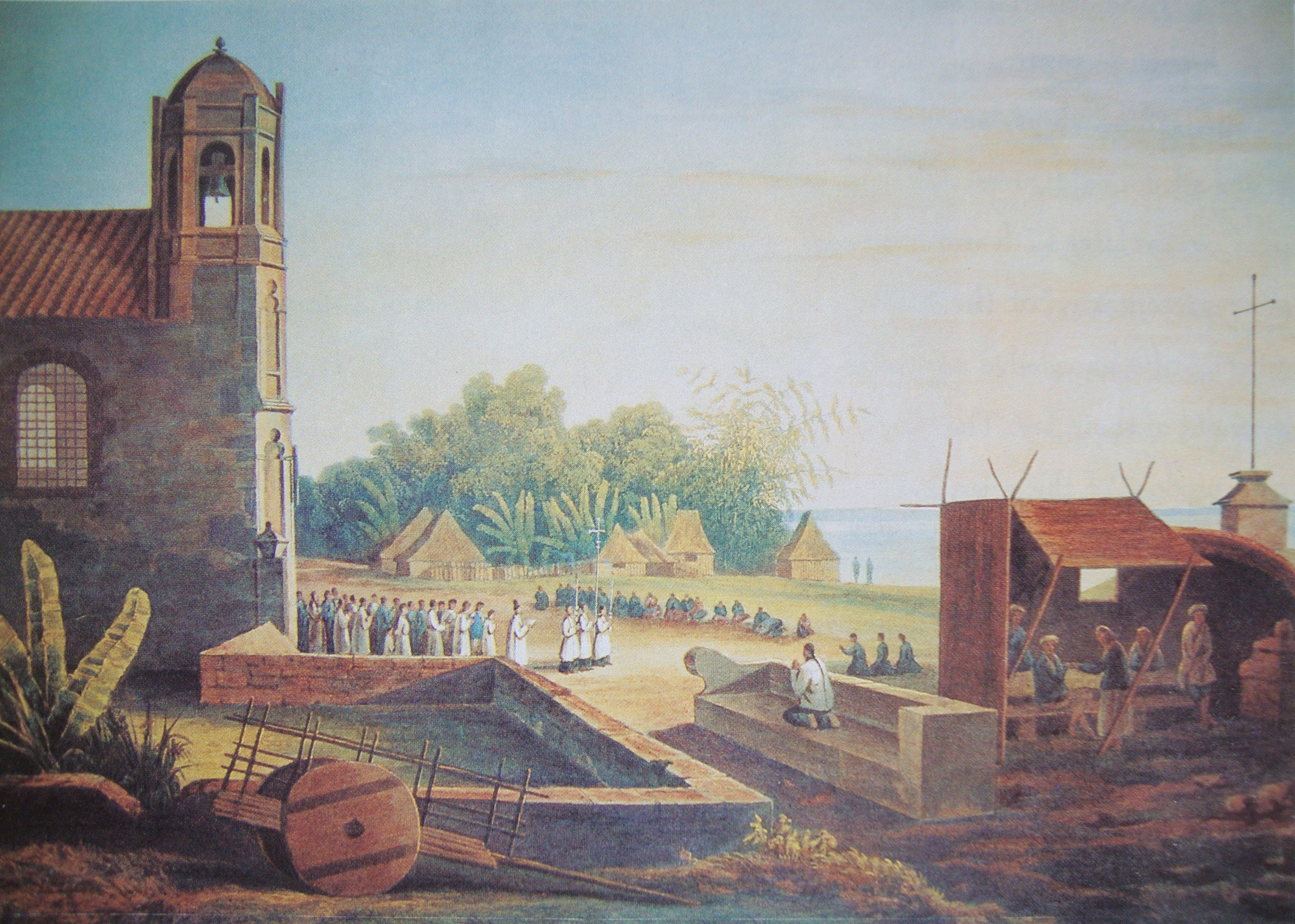
View of Malate Church in 1831.

Laplace reached Gibraltar in one week, and decided to set sail for Gorée, where he spent a week. The ship then made its way south, crossing the Equator on 4 February, and sighting the Cape of Good Hope on 6 March. Being forced to skip the scheduled stop in Cape Town due to poor weather, Laplace attempted to continue on to Île Bourbon. Forced south by winds, La Favorie was hit by a hurricane on 28 March. The hurricane reached Bourbon on 1 April, ravaging the island, and was closely followed by another, forcing Laplace to hurriedly set sail for Mauritius. Upon returning to St. Denis, a shark killed one of his crew members who was attempting to desert, and Laplace was unable to recover an anchor he had lost near the island.

On 1 May 1830, Laplace sailed towards India. Following the completion of one of his hydrological assignments, he continued on to Mahé, Seychelles. Six days later the crew had made their way past the Maldives and Ceylon (now known as Sri Lanka), before making landfall at Pondicherry on 9 June. In Madras (now known as Chennai), Laplace was able to purchase new anchors and cables, and left on 28 June. On the night of the 29th, La Favorite became grounded on a mudbank. The initial attempt to save the ship failed, but it was freed thanks to the help of nearby Indians. Laplace continued on to Yanaon before leaving the Indian coast on 2 August.

Laplace arrived in Singapore on 17 August, the first of a long series of South East Asian cities. In Manila, many of his crew grew sick; cholera was diagnosed on the land and the crew were reporting having colds and fevers. On 28 September, La Favorite recorded its only cholera fatality; the epidemic cleared up before long. After travelling via Macao, Laplace arrived in Canton (today Guangzhou), with the intent of discussing the difficulties of French traders with the Chinese authorities. Laplace managed to secure France as the most favoured nation of China. Setting sail on 18 December, Laplace arrived at Tourane (today Da Nang) on 21 December. There, he came across the S. Michel wrecked off the coast and the crew sick. Laplace attempted to allow the crew on board, but many died from their illnesses. In Tourane, Laplace was met with hostility, as the authorities were paranoid of his intentions in the area. It was suspected that La Favorite had a large army concealed in the hold, and Chinese soldiers were brought into the city to oversee Laplace's actions. Laplace left the area in frustration of Emperor Minh Mạng's isolationist policies, the diplomatic mission having failed.

On 5 March, Laplace sailed south towards the Natuna Islands, charting the area as they moved. In particular, Laplace attempted to complement Bougainville's earlier workaround around the Anambas, not finishing his work until 4 April. He then set sail for Surabaya in the Dutch East Indies. There he was informed of the events of the July Revolution, and that a war was expected. After dysentery struck the ship, Laplace moved on to Banyuwangi. During the trip, several men died, while morale decreased. Laplace attributed the ships poor health to the decrease of wine rations.

Laplace set sail for Hobart, and sighted Mewstone on 6 July. Two more men were buried on Bruny Island, before La Favorite was allowed to anchor at Hobart on 11 July. The sick men were sent to hospital, although three men were to die there. Laplace left Hobart on 7 August, and set sail for Sydney, arriving on 16 August. In Sydney the crew went to numerous social events, left to a twenty-one gun salute on 21 September 1831. Laplace proposed a short break in New Zealand, and anchored in the Bay of Islands on 2 October. There the crew gave gifts of guns to the Māori chieftains, who in turn greeted them with the haka. Laplace and his crew were 'disgusted' by the display, considering the Māori to be 'savages'. On 11 October, the crew took a number of detailed observations of New Zealand, including the Kawakawa River. These observations were taken to be an attempt to claim New Zealand for France, causing excitement in Sydney and even led to the British Government requesting clarification from the French. This concern, nonetheless, hurried the development of the Treaty of Waitangi.

After his stay in New Zealand, Laplace headed east, arriving in Valparaíso on 14 November. He continued south past Cape Horn and reached Rio de Janeiro on 23 January 1832. After being farewelled by the crew of a British warship, Laplace set sail for France. After reaching Gibraltar on 11 April, La Favorite anchored in Toulon harbour on 21 April. Laplace's voyage was generally successful, despite the setback in China. His account of the voyage, Voyage autour du Monde par les Mers de l'Inde et de la Chine, was published by the French government in 1833.

== Voyage of the Artémise ==
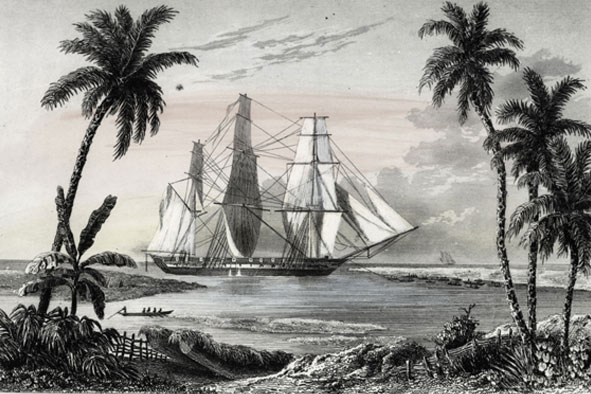
La frégate L'Artémise entrant à Tanoa, après son échouage

In 1837, Laplace once again undertook a voyage, this time as captain of the Artémise. The aim of this voyage was primarily political; Laplace delivered a manifesto on the treatment of Catholics in the Kingdom of Hawaii in July 1839 which came to be known as the Laplace Affair.

== See also ==
- European and American voyages of scientific exploration
