= Edict of Toleration (Hawaii) =

1839 toleration of Catholics in Hawaii

Traité conclu entre le roi des Sandwich et le capitaine Laplace
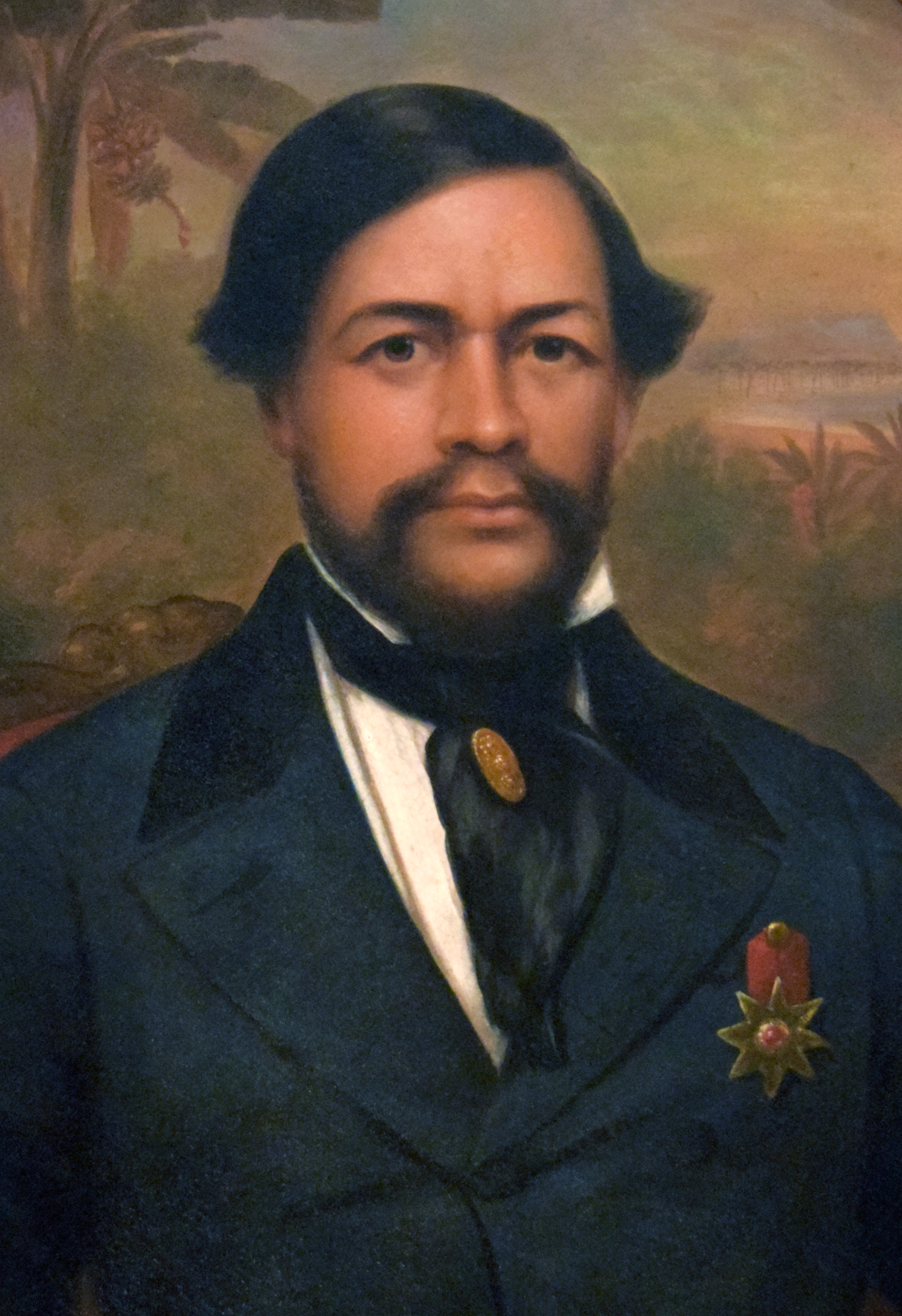
- Kamehameha III, in whose name the treaty was signed
- Type: Treaty granting religious liberty
- Signed: July 12, 1839
- Location: Honolulu, Oʻahu
- Signatories: Kekāuluohi and Kekūanaōʻa (for Kamehameha III); Cyrille Pierre Théodore Laplace (for France)
- Parties: Hawaiian Kingdom; Kingdom of the French
- Languages: French, Hawaiian

The Edict of Toleration was the 1839 grant of freedom of worship to members of the Catholic Church in the Hawaiian Kingdom. The edit ended roughly a decade of official suppression of Catholicism, during which French priests were expelled from the islands. The grant was secured by the French naval captain Cyrille Pierre Théodore Laplace, who threatened war unless the kingdom accepted his terms. The resulting treaty declared Catholic worship free, required the government to provide land for a Catholic church in Honolulu, freed imprisoned Catholics, and required a deposit of $20,000 as a guarantee.

== Background ==
Catholic missionaries representing the Congregation of the Sacred Hearts of Jesus and Mary arrived at Honolulu in July 1827, several years after Protestant missionaries from the American Board of Commissioners for Foreign Missions had arrived. Beginning in 1830, the law against idolatry was applied to Hawaiian Catholics and was treated as enforceable until 1839. In December 1831, under the regent Kaʻahumanu's order, the priests Alexis Bachelot and Patrick Short were deported to California as a result of this law. Bachelot and Short attempted to return to Hawaii in 1837 but were refused permission to stay.

On December 18, 1837, King Kamehameha III issued an ordinance forbidding the teaching of "the Pope's religion" with fines for anyone who promoted the faith. In practice, this made Congregationalism the state religion, with the homes of Catholics being searched and Catholics being forced to attend Protestant services. After regent Kīnaʻu's death in 1839, her successor Kekāuluohi forced 67 Catholics to march from Waiʻanae to Honolulu, resulting in at least one death before the Catholics pledged to convert.

=== June 1839 order ===
On June 18, 1839, Kekāuluohi answered an inquiry from Hiram Bingham about the march, stating that: "We have exercised that oppression. But it is brought to an end." Around the same time, the king had been persuaded by Bingham and other missionaries to order the release of the imprisoned Catholics. One 1839 pamphlet, attributed to Samuel Northrup Castle, said that the king had ordered all punishment for Catholics stopped 22 days before the arrival of Cyrille Pierre Théodore Laplace, a French naval captain who arrived in Honolulu in July 1839.The exact provenance and meaning of this pronouncement is unclear, as it was never published in the Sandwich Island Gazette (the normal publisher of new laws). The only firm evidence of the edict is from William Richards, who stated that he heard the king privately tell the governor to stop punishing Catholics for their religion. It is likely that, if there was a change of policy, it was a direct result of the king hearing that the French frigate Artémise was en route to the island.

== Laplace's arrival and demands ==
Cyrille Laplace, the captain of the Artémise, had been ordered by the French government to establish rules for the treatment of French subjects and Catholics in particular. The ship anchored at Honolulu on July 9, 1839. From the ship, Laplace sent ashore a manifesto demanding that Catholics be granted the same privileges as Protestants, that a site for a French Catholic church be granted, that any currently imprisoned Catholics be released, and that Kamehameha III pay France $20,000 (equivalent to $604,688 in 2025) as a guarantee. He also offered refuge to British and American Catholics on board the Artémise.

The king was not present at the time of Laplace's arrival, being on Maui, and Kekāuluohi obtained an extension of the deadline to July 15. The chiefs of Hawaii, unwilling to risk war, agreed to the terms without waiting for the king's approval and borrowed money from foreign merchants to pay the guarantee. On July 13, Oʻahu's governor Kekūanaōʻa carried the money and a signed treaty to the ship. The treaty bears the date July 12, 1839, and was signed in the king's name by both Kekāuluohi and Kekūanaōʻa.

== Terms of the treaty ==
The treaty, in the version Laplace published, contained five articles:

1. The Catholic religion was declared free throughout the islands, with members enjoying the same privileges as Protestants.
2. A site for a Catholic church at Honolulu would be granted, to be served by French priests.
3. All Catholics imprisoned for their religion would be freed immediately.
4. The king would pay the French government a deposit of $20,000 as a guarantee that the terms of the agreement would be followed.
5. The treaty and money would be brought about the Artémise while the Honolulu batteries saluted the French flag with 21 guns.

At an audience with Kamehameha III several days after the signing of the treaty, Laplace pressed the king to sign a separate treaty. The treaty included preferential treatment for French goods, a requirement that French subjects be tried by a jury selected by the French consul, and an overturning of the Hawaiian Kingdom's restrictions on imported alcohol. Laplace proposed the treaty to the king at 5pm on July 16 and demanded it be signed by the following morning. When the king protested, Laplace replied "Civilisation eat up the savage."

== Reactions and aftermath ==
Immediate reactions to the treaty were mixed. The Sandwich Island Gazette declared that toleration had been won against the advice of Protestant missionaries, while those missionaries replied that the king had ended punishments of Catholics prior to the arrival of the Artémise.

Within a year of the grant of toleration, the Catholic mission's total number of baptisms reached 550. Bishop Étienne Rouchouze arrived from France on May 14, 1840, with a group of priests that included Louis-Désiré Maigret. The Kingdom of Hawaii had prepared a site for the Catholic church under the terms of the treaty, but the mission chose to build a cathedral on land they already owned. The cathedral's cornerstone was laid on August 6, 1840, and it was dedicated on August 15, 1843.

The 1840 Constitution of the Hawaiian Kingdom provided that "all men of every religion shall be protected in worshipping Jehovah, and serving Him, according to their own understanding." Despite this, cases of idolatry were occasionally tried as late as 1857. France eventually repaid the $20,000 deposit in full.
