= Church of St. Thérèse of Lisieux =

Church of St. Thérèse of Lisieux may refer to:

- Cathedral of Saint Theresa of Lisieux, Hamilton, Bermuda
- St. Thérèse of Lisieux Church, Chongqing, China
- Basilica of St Therese of the Child Jesus, Cairo, Egypt
- Sainte-Thérèse-de-l'Enfant-Jésus, Hirson, Aisne, France
- Basilica of Sainte-Thérèse, Lisieux, France
- St. Therese of Infant Jesus Church, Kandanvilai, India
- St. Theresa of Lisieux Catholic Church, Vellayambalam, Trivandrum, India
- Saint Therese of the Child Jesus Parish Church, University of the Philippines Los Baños
- Shrine of St. Therese, Doctor of the Church, Villamor Air Base (Nichols), Pasay, Philippines
- St. Térèse Church, Ankara, Turkey
- St. Therese of Lisieux Church (Louisville, Kentucky), United States
- Virgen del Carmen y Santa Teresita, Montevideo, Uruguay

== See also ==
- List of places named after Saint Thérèse of Lisieux
- Saint Therese (disambiguation)
- Saint Teresa (disambiguation)
- Santa Teresa (disambiguation)
- St. Theresa's Cathedral (disambiguation)
- St. Theresa Church (disambiguation)
