= St. Theresa Church =

St. Theresa Church, or St. Teresa's Church or variations, may refer to:

== Canada ==
- St. Theresa's Catholic Church (Ottawa)
- St. Teresa Roman Catholic Church, New Toronto, Etobicoke, Ontario

== China ==
- St. Theresa's Church, Haining in Jiaxing, Zhejiang

== Comoros ==
- St. Theresa of the Child Jesus Church, Moroni

== Denmark ==
- St. Theresa's Church, Denmark, Copenhagen

== Gibraltar ==
- St. Theresa's Church, Gibraltar

== Hong Kong ==
- St. Teresa's Church, Waterloo Road, near Kadoorie Hill, Kowloon

== India ==
- Saint Theresa Church, Perambur, Chennai, Tamil Nadu
- St. Theresa of Lisieux Catholic Church, Vellayambalam, Kerala

== Ireland ==
- St. Teresa's Carmelite Church, Dublin

== Italy ==
- Santa Teresa, Turin

== Lithuania ==
- Church of St. Theresa, Vilnius

== Peru ==
- Church of Saint Thérèse of the Child Jesus, Lima

== Poland ==
- Carmelite Church, Przemyśl

== St. Kitts and Nevis ==
- St. Theresa Church, Charlestown

== Singapore ==
- Church of St Teresa, Singapore

== Sri Lanka ==
- St Theresa's Church Colombo

== United Kingdom ==
- Church of St Teresa of Avila, Birkdale, Merseyside, England
- St Teresa of Avila Church, Chiddingfold, Surrey, England

== United States ==
- Saint Teresa of Avila Church (Bodega, California)
- St. Theresa Church (Trumbull, Connecticut)
- Saint Theresa Catholic Church (Kekaha, Hawaii)
- Old St. Teresa Catholic Church, Albany, Georgia
- St. Teresa's Catholic Church (Hutchinson, Kansas)
- St. Theresa Roman Catholic Church (Rhodelia, Kentucky)
- Chapel of St. Theresa–the Little Flower, Detroit, Michigan
- St. Theresa of Avila Roman Catholic Church, Detroit, Michigan
- St. Teresa Church (Manhattan), New York
- St. Teresa of Avila Church (New York City), New York
- St. Teresa of the Infant Jesus's Church (Staten Island), New York
- St. Theresa of the Infant Jesus Church (Bronx), New York
- St. Theresa of Avila Catholic Church, Gonzales, Louisiana

== See also ==
- St. Theresa's Cathedral (disambiguation)
- Church of St. Thérèse of Lisieux (disambiguation)
