= Lourdes grotto =

Replicas of the Massabielle Grotto

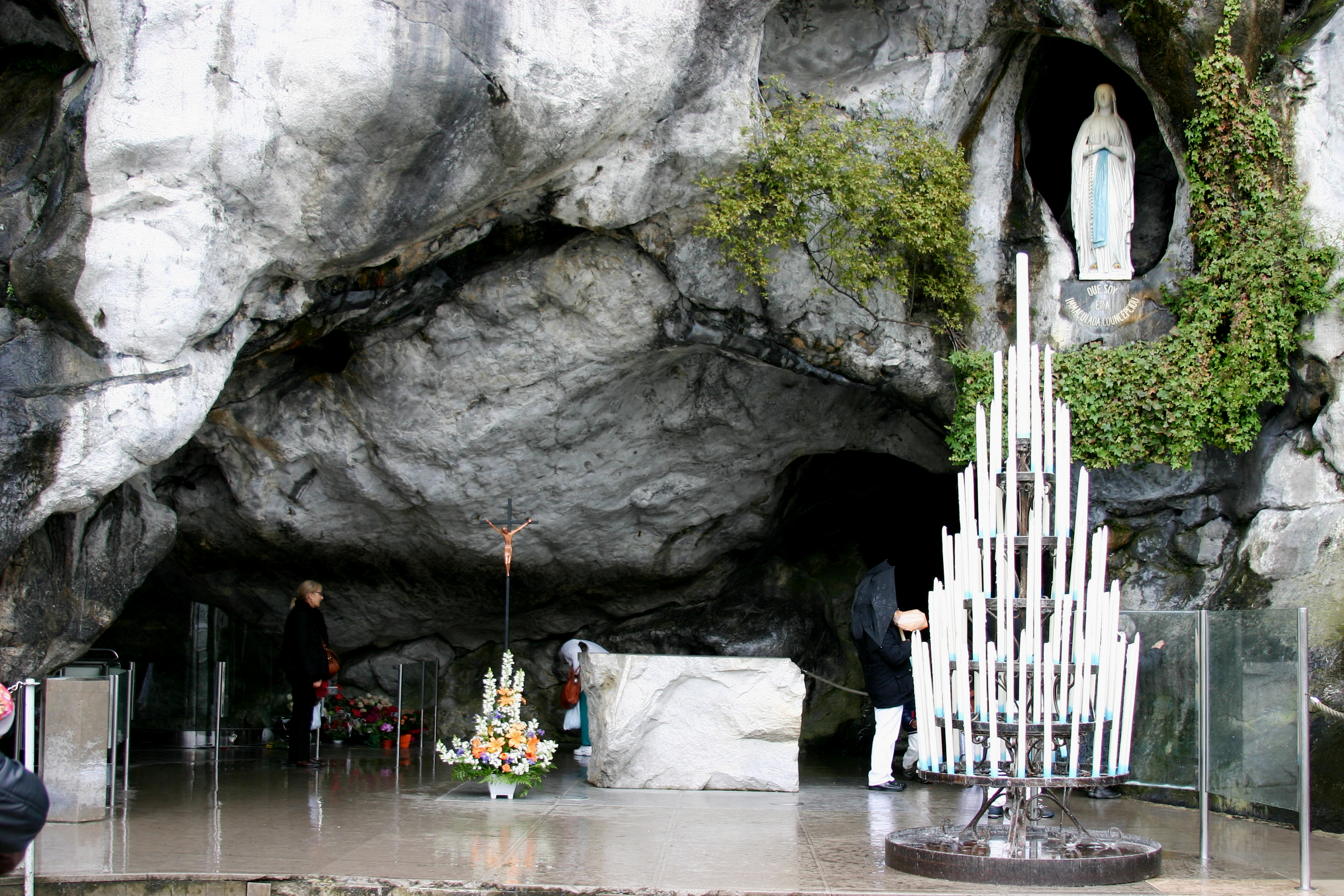
The original Lourdes grotto where the Lourdes apparitions occurred and where Lourdes spring water still flows.

A Lourdes grotto is a replica of the grotto where the Lourdes apparitions occurred in 1858, in the town of Lourdes in France, now part of the sanctuary of Our Lady of Lourdes. Some Lourdes grottos are almost identical reproductions of the scene of the apparitions, with statues of Our Lady of Lourdes and Bernadette Soubirous in a natural or artificial cave, while others may differ from the original in size, shape or style.

== Notable Lourdes grottoes ==
=== North America ===
==== Canada ====
- Our Lady of Lourdes Grotto, Flatrock, Newfoundland and Labrador
- Grotto of Our Lady of Lourdes, Rama, Saskatchewan
- Our Lady of Lourdes Grotto, Vanier, Ottawa, Ontario
- Saint Anthony Hermitage, Lac-Bouchette, Quebec

==== United States ====
===== Colorado =====
- The Grotto, Mother Cabrini Shrine, Golden, Colorado

===== Connecticut =====
- Shrine to Our Lady of Lourdes, Litchfield, Connecticut

===== Florida =====
- Basilica of St. Mary Star of the Sea, Key West, Florida

===== Illinois =====
- Lourdes Grotto, Annunciation Church, Aurora, Illinois
- Lourdes Grotto, National Shrine of Our Lady of the Snows, Belleville, Illinois
- Shrine to Our Lady of Lourdes, St. Mary Oratory, Rockford, Illinois
- Dominican University Shrine to Our Lady of Lourdes (the Grotto), River Forest, Illinois

===== Indiana =====
- Grotto of Our Lady of Lourdes, Notre Dame, University of Notre Dame, Notre Dame, Indiana
- Saint Joseph's College, Rensselaer, Indiana
- Grotto of Our Lady of Lourdes, National Shrine of Our Lady of Providence, Saint Mary-of-the-Woods, Indiana

Kansas

- Mary's Grotto, Atchison, Benedictine College. Dedicated on the Mary's Birthday, Marymas, of A.D. 2008

===== Kentucky =====
- Lourdes Rosary Shrine, Church of St. Louis Bertrand, Louisville, Kentucky

===== Louisiana =====
- The Grotto of the Holy Mother (1870s), St. Martin of Tours Catholic Church (St. Martinville, Louisiana)
- Lourdes Grotto, St. Michel de Cantrelle Church Convent, Louisiana
- Our Lady of Lourdes Grotto, New Iberia, Louisiana
- Lourdes Grotto, St. Ann Shrine, New Orleans, Louisiana

===== Maine =====
- Grotto of Our Lady of Lourdes, St. Anthony's Franciscan Monastery, Kennebunkport, Maine

===== Maryland =====
- Shrine of St. Anthony, Ellicott City, Maryland
- National Shrine Grotto of Our Lady of Lourdes, Emmitsburg, Maryland

===== Massachusetts =====
- Grotto of Our Lady of Lourdes, Stonehill College, Easton, Massachusetts
- Grotto of Our Lady of Lourdes, former Franco-American School, Lowell, Massachusetts
- Lourdes Grotto, National Shrine of The Divine Mercy (Stockbridge, Massachusetts), Stockbridge, Massachusetts

===== Michigan =====
- Assumption of the Blessed Virgin Mary Church, Detroit, Michigan
- St. Mary's Catholic Church, Detroit, Michigan
- Orchard Lake Schools, Orchard Lake, Michigan
- Our Lady of Good Counsel Catholic Church, Plymouth, Michigan

===== Minnesota =====
- St. Benedict's Monastery, St. Joseph, Minnesota

===== New Mexico =====
- Our Lady of Lourdes Grotto, Los Ojos, New Mexico

===== New York =====
- Lourdes Grotto, College of Mount Saint Vincent, Bronx, New York
- Our Lady of Lourdes Grotto, St. Lucy's Church, Bronx, New York
- Grotto Shrine of Our Lady of Lourdes (1898–2015), Our Lady of Lourdes Church, Brooklyn, New York
- Shrine of Our Lady of Lourdes, Holy Family Church, Fairmount, New York
- Shrine of Our Lady of Lourdes, Immaculate Conception Church, New Lebanon, New York
- Our Lady of Lourdes Grotto, St. Cabrini Home, West Park, New York

===== North Carolina =====
- Grotto of Our Lady of Lourdes, Belmont Abbey, North Carolina

===== Ohio =====
- Our Lady of Lourdes Grotto, Central Catholic High School, Canton, Ohio
- Our Lady of Lourdes Grotto, Mount Saint John, Dayton, Ohio
- Our Lady of Lourdes National Shrine, Euclid, Ohio
- Lourdes Grotto, Our Lady of the Pines, Fremont, Ohio
- Our Lady of Lourdes Grotto and Church, Genoa, Ohio
- Our Lady of Lourdes Shrine, St. Joseph Catholic Church, Mogadore, Ohio

Pennsylvania

- Our Lady of Lourdes Grotto, Duquesne University of the Holy Spirit, Pittsburgh, Pennsylvania
- Our Lady of Lourdes Grotto, Mercyhurst University, Erie, Pennsylvania
- Our Lady of Lourdes Grotto, Saint Francis University, Loretto, Pennsylvania

===== Texas =====
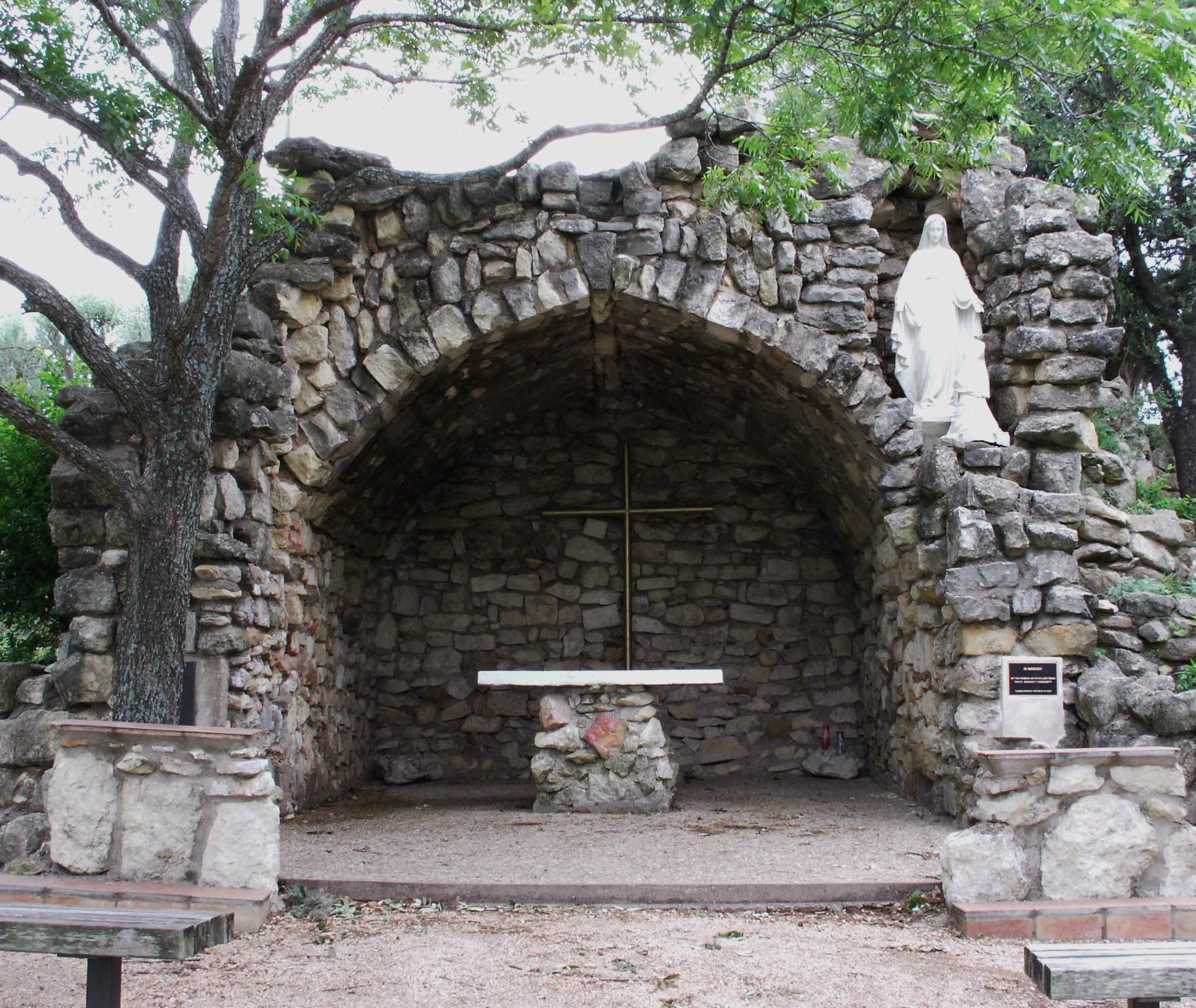
Lourdes grotto at St. Edward's University.

- Our Lady of Lourdes Grotto, St. Edward's University, Austin, Texas
- Our Lady of Lourdes Grotto of the Southwest, Oblate Missions, San Antonio, Texas

===== Wisconsin =====
- St. Francis de Sales Seminary, St. Francis, Wisconsin

=== South America ===
==== Argentina ====
- Grotto of Lourdes, San Pedro de Colalao, Tucumán Province

==== Chile ====
- Grotto of Lourdes, Basilica of Lourdes, Santiago

==== Uruguay ====
- National Shrine of the Grotto of Lourdes, Church of the Savior, Montevideo, Uruguay

=== Asia-Pacific ===
==== India ====
- Our Lady of Lourdes Shrine, Villianur, Puducherry
- Immaculate Conception Cathedral, Pondicherry
- St. Andrew's Church, Puducherry
- St. Theresa Church, Perambur
- Gunadala Matha Shrine, Vijayawada

==== Japan ====
- Grotto of Lourdes, St. Mary's Cathedral, Tokyo
- Our Lady of the Angels Trappistine Abbey, Hakodate, Hokkaido

==== Philippines ====
- Our Lady of Lourdes Grotto, Baguio, Benguet
- Our Lady of Lourdes Grotto Shrine, San Jose del Monte, Bulacan
- Our Lady of Lourdes Grotto, Cotabato City, Mindanao

==== Taiwan ====
- Shrine of Our Lady of Lourdes, Guanxi Township

=== Europe ===
==== Austria ====
- Our Lady of Lourdes Grotto, Heiligenkreuz

==== Belgium ====
- Lourdesgrot, Humbeek
- Oostakker Basilica, Slotendries
- La Grotte Notre-Dame de Lourdes, Jette
- Le Petit Lourdes, Bassenge

==== Croatia ====
- Saint Ignatius Church, Dubrovnik

==== Ireland ====
- Church of St. John, Cratloe, Cratloe, County Clare
- Dominican Convent, Cabra, County Dublin

==== Lithuania ====
- Kretinga Lourdes Grotto, Kretinga

==== Netherlands ====
- Lourdes Grotto, Sereo Preto, Aruba
- Lourdes Grotto (Lourdesgrot), Scheveningen, The Hague
- Lourdesgrot, Sint Nicolaasga, Friesland

==== United Kingdom ====
- Carfin Grotto, Carfin, Scotland
- Lourdes Grotto, Cleator, Cumbria, England
- Our Lady of Lourdes shrine, Our Lady of Lourdes Church, Hednesford, Staffordshire, England
- Grotto in St Mary's Church, Selby, North Yorkshire, England

==== Vatican City ====
- Grotta di Lourdes, Gardens of Vatican City

== See also ==
- Lourdes apparitions
- Our Lady of Lourdes
- Sanctuary of Our Lady of Lourdes
