= Therese =

Therese or Thérèse is a variant of the feminine given name Teresa. It may refer to:

== Persons ==
=== Therese ===
- Duchess Therese of Mecklenburg-Strelitz (1773–1839), member of the House of Mecklenburg-Strelitz and a Duchess of Mecklenburg
- Therese of Brunswick-Wolfenbüttel (1728–1778), German noblewoman
- Therese of Saxe-Hildburghausen, (1792–1854), queen of Bavaria
- Princess Therese of Nassau-Weilburg (1815 – 1871), Duchess Peter of Oldenburg
- Princess Therese of Saxe-Altenburg (1836 – 1914), Duchess of Dalarna
- Therese Alshammar (born 1977), Swedish swimmer
- Therese Björk (born 1981), Swedish footballer
- Therese Borssén (born 1984), Swedish skier
- Therese Brandl (1902–1948), Nazi concentration camp guard. Convicted of crimes against humanity after the war and executed
- Therese Brophy, camogie player
- Therese Crawford (born 1976), American volleyball player
- Therese Elssler (1808–1878), Austrian dancer and baroness
- Therese Giehse (1898–1975), German actress
- Therese Grankvist (born 1977), Swedish singer and songwriter also known as Drömhus and Therese
- Therese Grob (1798–1875), first love of the composer Franz Schubert
- Therese Grünbaum (1791–1876), Austrian soprano and opera singer
- Therese Holbein von Holbeinsberg (1785–1859), Austrian landscape painter and etcher
- Therese Huber (1764–1829), German author
- Therese Johaug (born 1988), Norwegian cross-country skier
- Therese Lundin (footballer) (born 1979), Swedish footballer
- Therèse Lundin (swimmer) (born 1970), Swedish swimmer
- Therese Maher, camogie player
- Therese Malfatti (1792–1851), Austrian musician and friend of Ludwig van Beethoven
- Therese Malten (real name Therese Müller) (1855–1930), German dramatic soprano
- Therese Maron (1725–1806), German painter
- Therese Murray (born 1947), American state legislator
- Therese Neumann (1898–1962), German Catholic mystic and stigmatic
- Therese Peche (1806–1882), German-born Austrian stage actress
- Therese Schnabel (1876–1959), German contralto
- Therese Sjölander (born 1981), Swedish ice hockey player
- Therese Sjögran (born 1977), known as Terre, Swedish football (soccer) player
- Therese Studer (1862-1931), German labour activist
- Therese Svendsen (born 1989), Swedish swimmer
- Therese Torgersson (born 1976), Swedish competitive sailor and Olympic medalist
- Therese Vogl (1845–1921), German operatic soprano
- Therese Zenz (1932–2019), German sprint canoer

=== Therése ===
- Therése O'Callaghan, camogie player

=== Thérèse ===
- Princess Thérèse of France (1736–1744), French Princesse du Sang
- Thérèse Aillaud (1931–2015), French politician
- Thérèse Albert (c. 1805–1846), French actress
- Thérèse Blondeau (1913–2013), French swimmer
- Thérèse Bonney (1894–1978), American photographer and publicist
- Thérèse Brenet (born 1935), French composer
- Thérèse Casgrain (1896–1981), feminist, reformer, politician and senator in Quebec, Canada
- Thérèse Caval (1750–1795), French revolutionary
- Thérèse Chardin, French hairstylist and celebrity
- Thérèse Coffey (born 1971), English politician
- Thérèse Couderc, also known as St. Theresa Couderc (1805–1885), co-founder of the Sisters of the Cenacle, a Catholic religious order
- Thérèse Daviau (1946–2002), Quebec, Canada politician, an attorney and a City Councillor in Montreal, Quebec
- Thérèse Delpech (1948–2012), French intellectual and writer
- Thérèse Dion (1927–2020), popularly known as Maman Dion, Québécois television personality, and the mother of pop singer Céline Dion
- Thérèse Dorny (1891–1976), French film and theatre actress
- Thérèse Elfforss (1823–1905), Swedish actress and theatre director
- Thérèse Karlsson (born 1972), Finnish soprano singer and actor
- Thérèse Lavoie-Roux (1928–2009), Quebec politician and Canadian Senator
- Thérèse Levasseur (1721–1801), domestic partner of French philosopher Jean-Jacques Rousseau
- Thérèse Liotard (1946–2026), French actress
- Thérèse of Lisieux (1873–1897), French saint
- Thérèse McMurray (born 1947), Irish-British television actress
- Thérèse Meyer (born 1948), Swiss politician
- Thérèse Oulton (born 1953), English painter
- Thérèse Peltier (1873–1926), French sculptor and aviator
- Thérèse Quentin (1929–2015), French actress
- Thérèse Rein (born 1958), Australian entrepreneur and founder of Ingeus
- Thérèse Schwartze (1851–1918), Dutch portrait painter
- Thérèse Sita-Bella (1933–2006), Cameroonian filmmaker, pilot, journalist
- Thérèse Steinmetz (born 1933), Dutch singer
- Thérèse Tietjens (1831–1877), opera and oratorio soprano singer
- Thérèse Tréfouël (1892–1978), French biochemist
- Thérèse Vanier (1923–2014), veteran and medical doctor
- Thérèse Wartel (1814–1865), French pianist, music educator, composer and critic

== Fictional characters ==
- Thérèse Defarge, a villain in Charles Dickens' novel A Tale of Two Cities
- Thérèse, Massenet's 1906 opera
- the title character of Therese (novel), or Chronik eines Frauenlebens, a 1928 novel by Arthur Schnitzler
- the title character of Thérèse the Philosopher, a 1748 French novel ascribed to Jean-Baptiste de Boyer, Marquis d'Argens
- the title character of Thérèse Raquin, an 1867 novel and an 1873 play by the French writer Émile Zola
- the title character of:
  - Thérèse Desqueyroux (novel), a 1927 novel by François Mauriac
  - Thérèse Desqueyroux (1962 film), an adaptation of the novel
  - Thérèse Desqueyroux (2012 film), an adaptation of the novel

== See also ==
- Mother Teresa
- Saint Therese (disambiguation)
- Marie Thérèse (disambiguation)
- Maria Theresa (disambiguation)
- Teréz Brunszvik (1775–1861), member of the Hungarian nobility, pedagogue
- Tess (disambiguation)
