= P.A. Aziz College of Engineering & Technology =

Educational institute in Kerala, India

- Type: Private
- Established: 2003
- Affiliations: KTU, AICTE
- Patron: P.A. Aziz Trust
- Location: Trivandrum, Kerala, India; 8°34′36″N 76°58′12″E
- Campus: Urban 37 acres (15 ha) (Main campus)
- Chairman & Managing Trustee: Mr. Mohammed Thaha
- Nickname: PAACET
- Website: paacetlive.com

P.A. Aziz College of Engineering & Technology (In Malayalam പി.എ. അസീസ് കോളേജ് ഓഫ് എഞ്ചിനീയറിങ്ങ് & ടെക്ക്‌നോളജി) or PAACET, was established in 2003 under the patronage of the P.A. Aziz Trust. The college is located at Karakulam, seven kilometers from Kowdiar Palace, Trivandrum city in southern Kerala, India.

The college is affiliated with the KTU. Admission to the college is based on entrance examinations conducted by the Commissioner of Entrance Examinations, Kerala.

== Origins ==
The college is a tribute to the late P.A. Aziz, who was a social, political and trade union leader, devoting his life to uplifting the weaker sections in Kerala. The college is managed by family members, and the chairman is Mr. Mohammed Thaha. The college received affiliation from APJ Abdul Kalam Technological University, under the Government of Kerala in 2017.

The college provides the following B.tech courses, namely:

- Computer Science and Engineering
- Mechanical Engineering
- Electrical & Electronics Engineering
- Electronics & Communication Engineering
- Applied Electronics & Instrumentation Engineering
- Civil Engineering,

In addition to this, it also provides an MCA course(two year).

The college also has five polytechnic diploma (three year) courses, namely

- Civil Engineering
- Mechanical Engineering
- Computer Engineering
- Automobile Engineering
- Biomedical Engineering

== Location ==
The college is located at a campus, 500 meters above the sea level, at Karakulam. The college is ten kilometers from Kowdiar Palace, Trivandrum City in southern Kerala. The campus is spread over 37 acres of landscaped land. The college is fifteen kilometres away from Thiruvananthapuram Central railway station.

== See also ==
- AICTE
- APJ Abdul Kalam Technological University
