= St. Theresa of Lisieux Catholic Church, Vellayambalam =

Latin Catholic church in Trivandrum, Kerala, India

St.Theresa of Lisieux Church
- Exterior View
- St.Theresa of Lisieux Church
- Location: Trivandrum, Kerala
- Country: India
- Denomination: Roman Catholic
- Sui iuris church: Latin Church
- Website: vellayambalamparish.org

History
- Status: Parish church
- Dedication: Thérèse of Lisieux
- Consecrated: 1996

Architecture
- Architectural type: Church
- Completed: 26 January 2004; 22 years ago

Specifications
- Capacity: 750 worshippers

Clergy
- Priest: Fr. Dr Gladin Alex

St. Theresa of Lisieux Catholic Church is a Roman Catholic church in Vellayambalam junction, in the city of Trivandrum, capital of the state of Kerala, India. The church is dedicated to Saint Thérèse of Lisieux and is close to the archbishop's residence and The Raj Bhavan.

== Parish ==
The parish of the St. Theresa of Lisieux Catholic Church is under the care of Very Rev. Fr. Dr Gladin Alex DCL. In addition to being the Parish Priest Fr. Gladin also has the duties of being the Judicial Vicar, Archdiocese of Trivandrum.

== History ==
The church started as a small group of people from the areas of Vellayambalam, Sasthamangalam, Kowdiar, and many surrounding areas. The people got together at a small Shed beside the existing church building. At the beginning there used to be Mass in the Malayalam language. Later they had English mass as well. To this day this continues. There is English Mass Every Sunday after the Malayalam Mass. After the year 2000 the parishioners decided to build a new church building. The number of people arriving for mass was more than what could be accommodated in the shed that was used. With the donations and efforts of many people, they constructed a new church.
