= Saint Teresa =

Saint Teresa, Saint Theresa or Saint Teresa's may refer to:

== People ==
- List of saints named Teresa

== Places ==
- St. Teresa, Newfoundland and Labrador, Canada, a local service district and designated place
- St. Teresa, Florida, United States, a town

== Schools ==
- College of Saint Teresa, a former Catholic women's college in Winona, Minnesota, United States
- Saint Theresa's College (disambiguation)
- Saint Teresa's School (disambiguation)
- St. Teresa's Academy, a Catholic, independent secondary school for girls in Kansas City, Missouri, United States

== Other uses ==
- St. Theresa Church (disambiguation)
- St. Teresa's Hospital, Hong Kong
- "St. Teresa", a song by Joan Osborne from Relish

== See also ==
- Southside–Saint Teresa, a neighborhood in Durham, North Carolina, United States
- Sainte Thérèse (disambiguation)
- Santa Teresa (disambiguation)
