= Christ Nagar School, Thiruvananthapuram =

Private school in Kerala, India

Christ Nagar School

Location
- Kowdiar, near Vellayambalam Junction; Thiruvananthapuram, Kerala; India; 8.5142°N 76.9595°E

Information
- School type: CMI, Private, Mixed
- Patron saint: Kuriakose Elias Chavara
- Established: 1976; 50 years ago
- School board: Carmelites of Mary Immaculate (CMI), fathers
- Manager: Rev. Fr. Thomas Chathamparambil
- Principal (State): Rev. Fr. Jimmy Moolayil
- Principal (ICSE): Rev. Fr. Dr. Jojo Vadekkeparampil
- Principal (CBSE): Rev. Fr.Cyriac Kanayil
- Classes: LKG to Standard XII
- Language: English
- Houses: Emerald/Expo; Topaz/Everest; Sapphire/olympic; Ruby/Appollo
- Sports: Basketball, cricket, football, table tennis
- Yearbook: Excelsior
- Website: www.christnagarschools.org

Christ Nagar School started in 1976 as a private English Medium School in Thiruvananthapuram, India, recognised by the STATE GOVERNMENT OF Kerala as a minority educational institution. In 2002, Christ Nagar High School was upgraded to higher secondary level. It has four syllabus which includes State, CBSE, ICSE and IGCSE.

Christ Nagar Group of Schools in Thiruvananthapuram (Trivandrum), Kerala, is managed by the Fathers of the Carmelites of Mary Immaculate (CMI) congregation, the institution has built a strong reputation for academic excellence, discipline, and holistic development.

== Schools ==
Christ Nagar Group of Educational Institutions consists of 4 private schools, a teachers' training college and a kindergarten.

Institution	Board Affiliation	Location	Principal	Established
Christ Nagar English Higher Secondary School	Kerala State Board of Education	Kowdiar, Thiruvananthapuram	Rev. Fr. Jimmy Moolayil	1976 (upgraded to higher secondary in 2002)
Christ Nagar Central School	CBSE, Delhi	Kowdiar, Thiruvananthapuram	Rev. Fr. Cyriac Kanayil	2005
Christ Nagar Higher Secondary School	ICSE/ISC Board, Delhi	Kowdiar, Thiruvananthapuram	Rev. Fr. Dr. Mathew Thengumpally	1994 (upgraded to upper-secondary in 1996)
Christ Nagar Senior Secondary School	CBSE, Delhi	Thiruvallam, Thiruvananthapuram	Rev. Fr. Cyriac Kanayil CMI	1996
Christ Nagar International School	Cambridge International Examinations curriculum	kazhakootam, Thiruvananthapuram	Rev. Fr. Thomas Chennattusserry CMI	2004
Christ Nagar College of Education	Kerala University, Thiruvananthapuram	Thiruvallam, Thiruvananthapuram		
Christ Nagar Kindergarten		Kowdiar and Thiruvallam, Thiruvananthapuram		

The schools in Kowdiar share a campus near Vellayambalam Junction in Thiruvananthapuram, Kerala.

== Achievements ==
- The State School has secured cent percent pass, more than three State Ranks and the largest number of distinctions for a single school in the state every year at the public examinations for the last 15 years.
- More than 5% of the SSLC students and more than 11% of the ISC students who passed out from the school have entered professional courses through entrance exams.
- Won the Computer Literary Award instituted by the Ministry of Communications and Information Technology, Government of India.
- The Christ Nagar international School Kowdiar won the British Council's International School Award for the year 2005-06.
- A student of Christ Nagar Higher Secondary School, came second in the 2010 Indian Certificate of Secondary Education Board, scoring 98% in the exams.
- A student of Christ Nagar Higher Secondary School, topped the 2012 Indian School Certificate Board, scoring 99% in the exams.

== Management ==
- The Christ Nagar group of schools is owned and managed by the fathers of religious congregation of the Carmelites of Mary Immaculate (CMI) at Christ Hall, the CMI Monastery at Kowdiar, Trivandrum.
- All of the schools are co-educational.
- Rev. Fr. Mathew Thayil is the Manager to all the Christ Nagar Schools.
- The Principal of the International School is Fr. Sebastian Attichira CMI.

== Admission ==
Though under a Christian management, admission to the schools are open to all students irrespective of caste and creed .

== Notable alumni ==
- Abhirami, actress
- Anoop Menon, actor, scriptwriter and lyricist
- Nazriya Nazim, actress
- Shanker Ramakrishnan, film director and screenplay writer
