= Little Flower High School =

Little Flower High School or Little Flower Secondary School may refer to:

- Little Flower High School, Thane, Maharashtra, India
- Little Flower High School, Hyderabad, Telangana, India
- Little Flower Convent Higher Secondary School, Irinjalakuda, Kerala, India
- Little Flower Catholic High School for Girls, Philadelphia, Pennsylvania, US

== See also ==
- Little Flower School (disambiguation)
- Little Flower (disambiguation)
