= Our Lady of the Angels Trappistine Abbey =

Abbey in Hokkaido, Japan

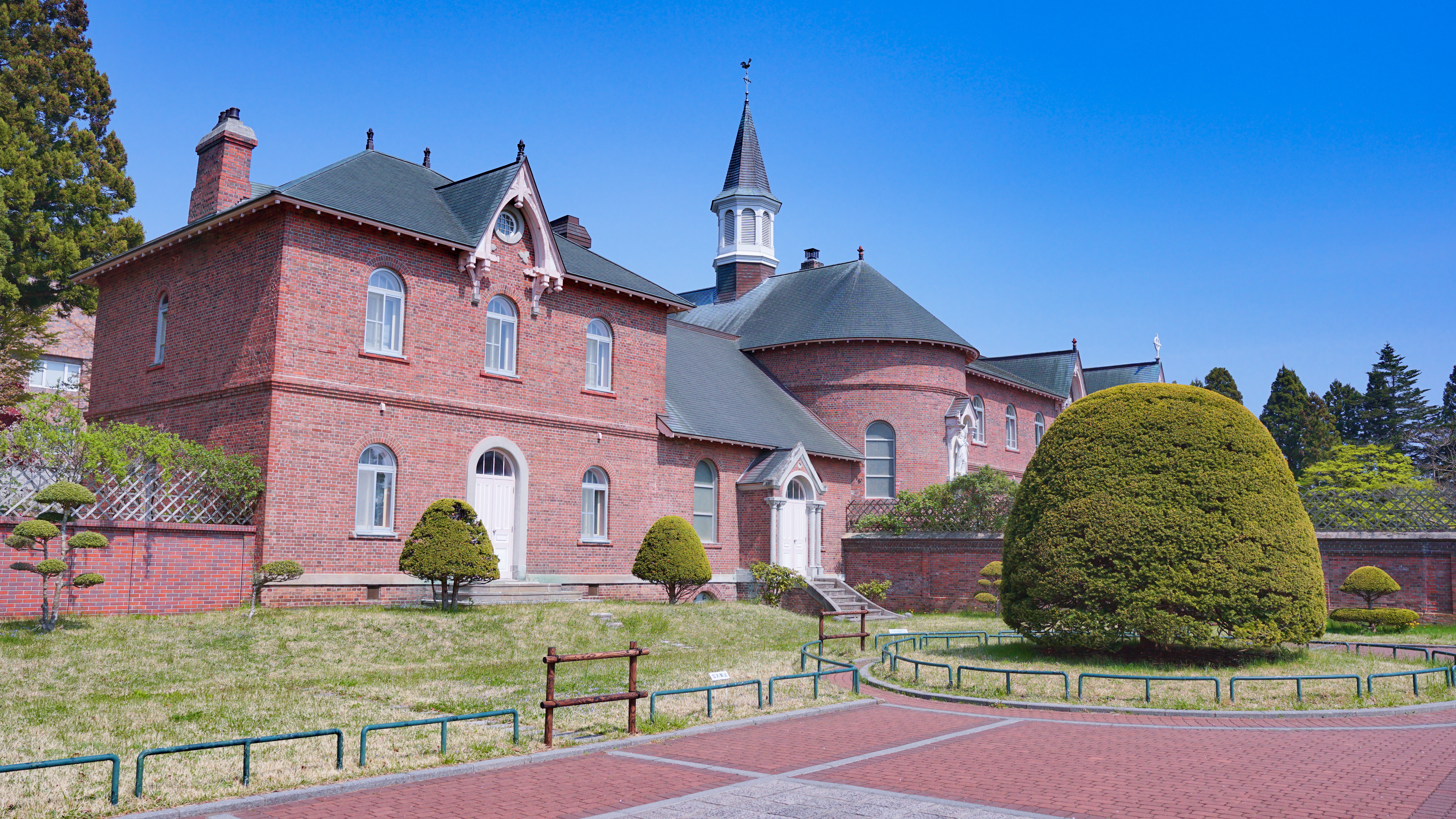
- The Angels Trappistine Abbey
- Interactive map of Our Lady of the Angels Trappistine Abbey

Monastery information
- Established: 1898
- Reestablished: 1927

People
- Bishop: Roman Catholic Diocese of Sapporo

Architecture
- Style: Gothic and Romanesque

Site
- Location: Japan 346 Kamiyukawa, Hakodate, Hokkaido
- Other information: Off-limits to men (still, there are certain areas open to the public)
- Website: www.ocso-tenshien.jp/eng/

Our Lady of the Angels Trappistine Abbey 天使の聖母トラピスチヌ修道院
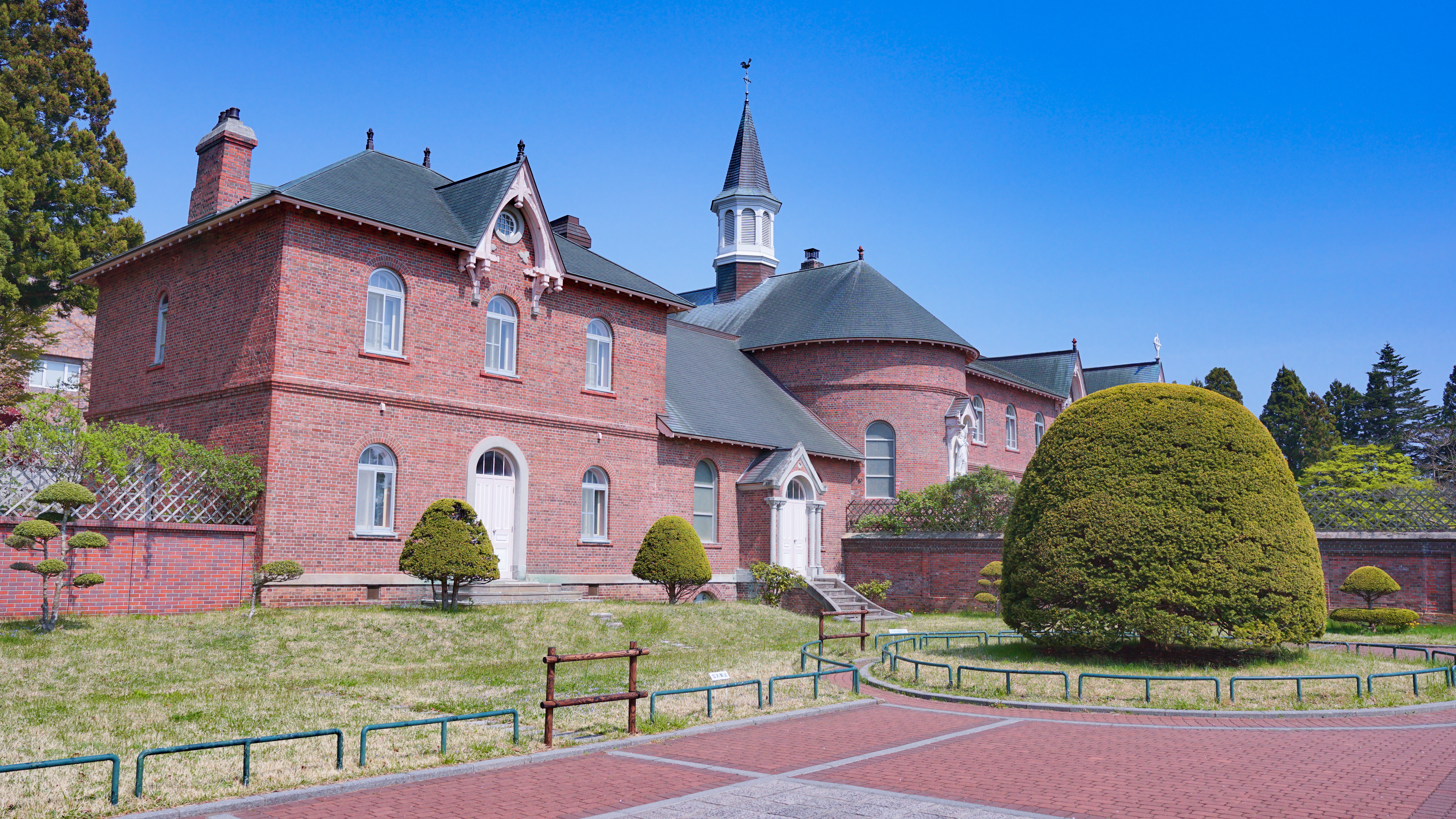

- Location within Japan

Religion
- Affiliation: Trappists
- Religious features: Abbey/Religious tourism

Location
- Coordinates: 41.78785°N 140.822514°E

Our Lady of the Angels Trappistine Abbey (天使の聖母トラピスチヌ修道院, Tenshi No Seibo Torasupichinu Shūdōin) is a women's abbey of Trappists located in the outskirts of Hakodate, Hokkaido, Japan.

This is the first women contemplative order of Japan, colloquially known as "The Anjel Garden"(Tenshien).

Founded by a group of eight nuns sent from France in 1898, After that, the building was rebuilt twice due to fires, one in 1925 and the other in 1941.

Rofū Miki visited this place and wrote a lyric called 'Nobara' lit. 'Wild rose', a song composed by Kōsaku Yamada, and 'Nobara' became familiar with a Japanese song. (Note: Actually, It's Rugosa rose)

== Timeline ==
- 1896 – Due to the request of the first head of Catholic Diocese generator in Hakodate, an abbot of the Chinese Consolation Monastery determined to establish a monastery.
- 1898 – The eight nuns (Note: Members of an Abbey of Ubexy, France) arrived at, On 30 April, Our Lady of the Angels Trappistine Abbey was established.
- 1899 – First two Japanese applicants joined in.
- 1905 – The two-story brick building was constructed that would be part of the main building's front side.
- 1907 – Great fire of Hakodate occurred. At that time, some rooms were provided by Sisters of Saint Paul in Hakodate of Chartres as a refuge for orphanages who were kept eye on by nuns.
- 1912 – The production of Dutch cream cheese had commenced. After a few years, started making butter.
- 1913 – Main building and Cathedral were completed.
- 1925 – First fire that occurred in October, the Cathedral, etc was destroyed by a fire. After that, reestablished just in two years.
- 1927 – The main building and Cathedral were restored and designed by Max Heindel who is Swiss architect.
- 1932 – Monastery commune had been more than 100 people.
- 1941 – Second fire that occurred in May.
- 1948 – The 50th anniversary ceremony was held.
- 1956 – Started off manufacturing and baked sweet called 'Madarena'.
- 1959 – Set off production of butter candies.
- 1968 – Compline and Grace (prayer) were changed from Latin to Japanese.
- 1982 – Decided to establish a branch monastery in South Korea.
- 1987 – Korean monastery, "Sujeong Trappist Monastery" was established.
- 1998 – The 100th anniversary ceremony was held.
- 2004 – The cattle barn closed, so dairy farming business ended which lasted about 90 years.
- 2008 – Visitation Cathedral hosts a public 'Prayer Gathering for World Peace' event for the first time in Japan.
- 2013 – Butter candy was no longer being produced.
- 2016 – The ceramic relief was created in the formerly service entrance.

== Gallery ==
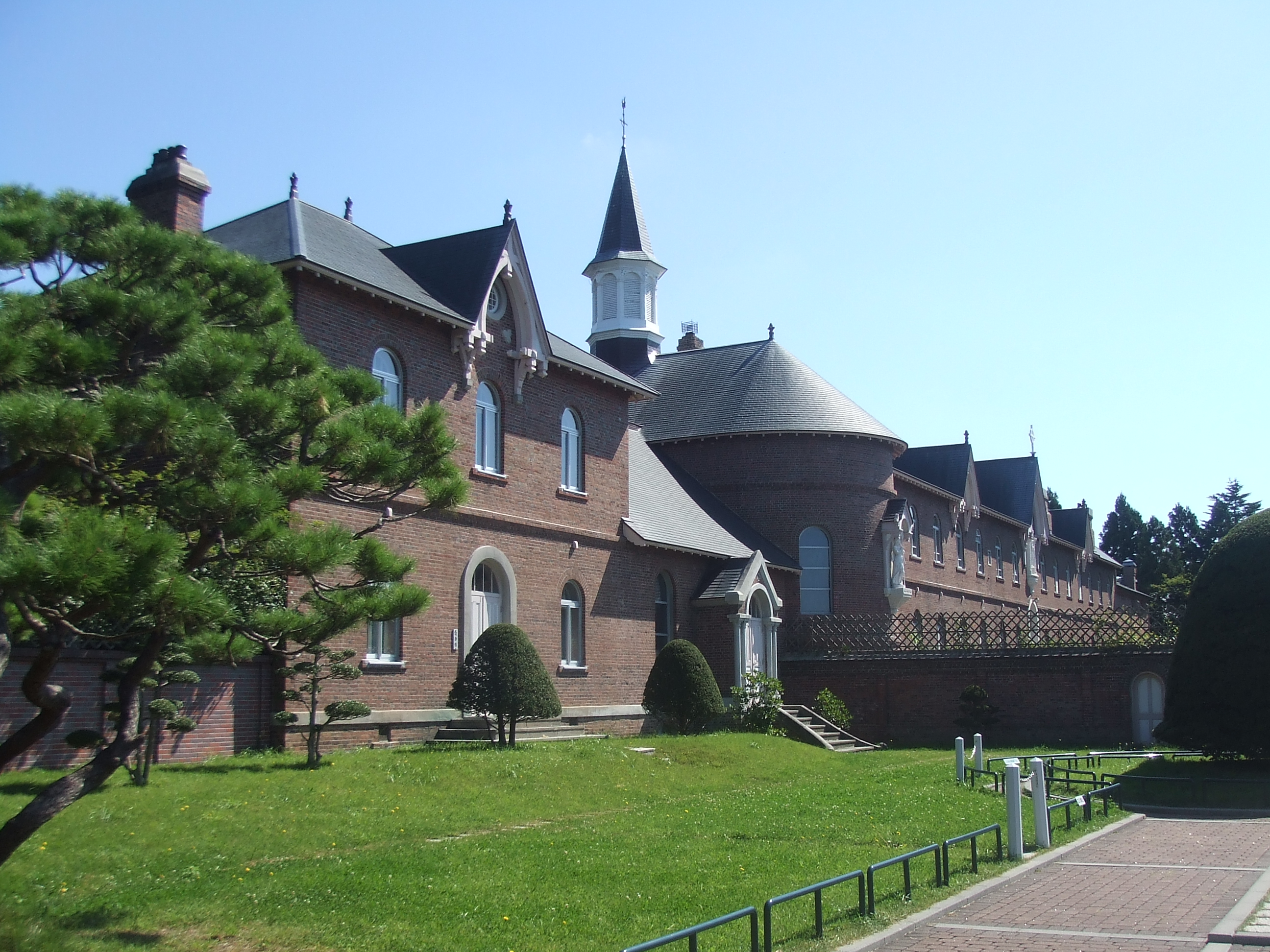
An appearance of the main building (2008)

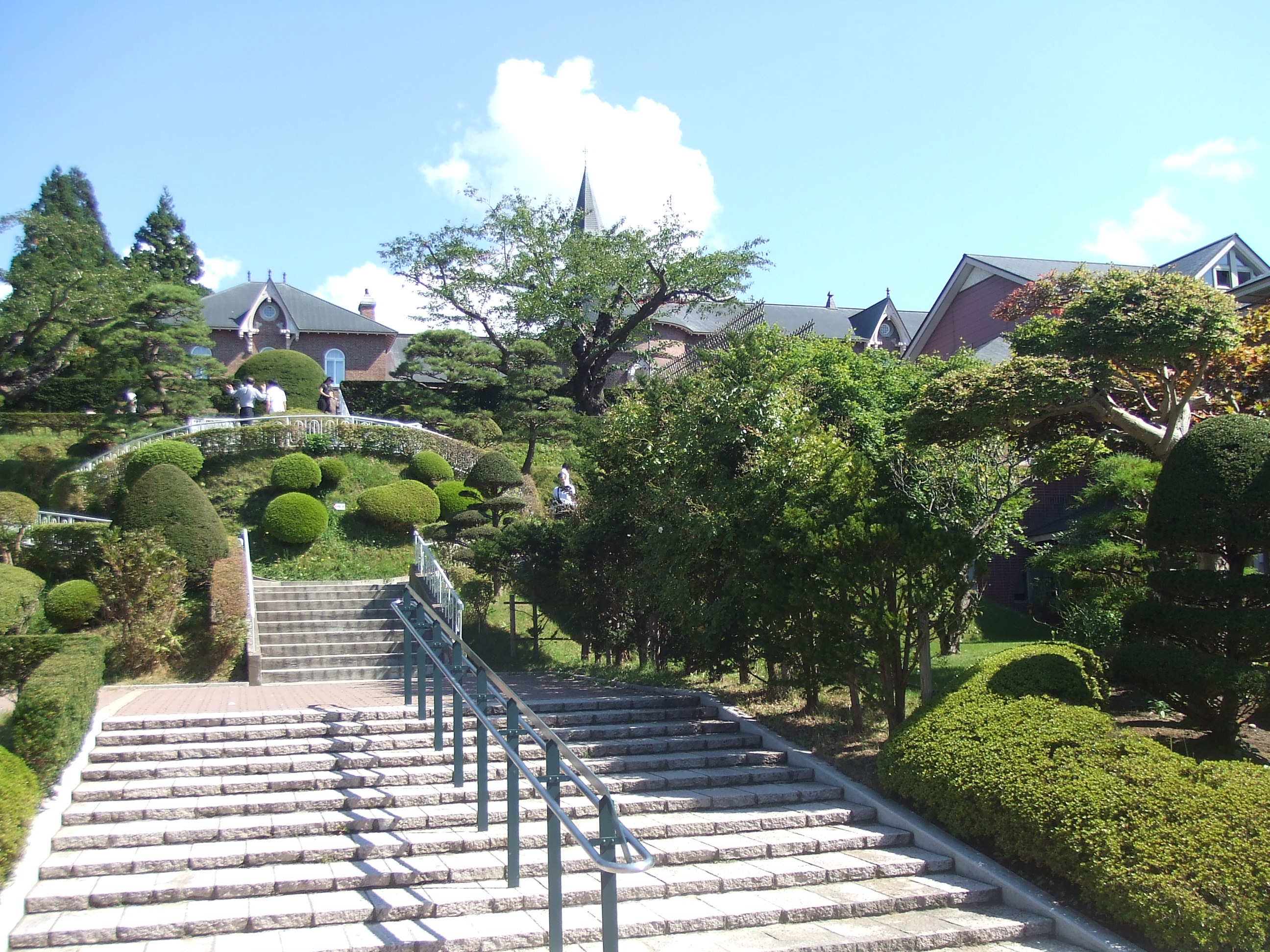
Looking up at the monastery from the bottom of the stairs (2008)

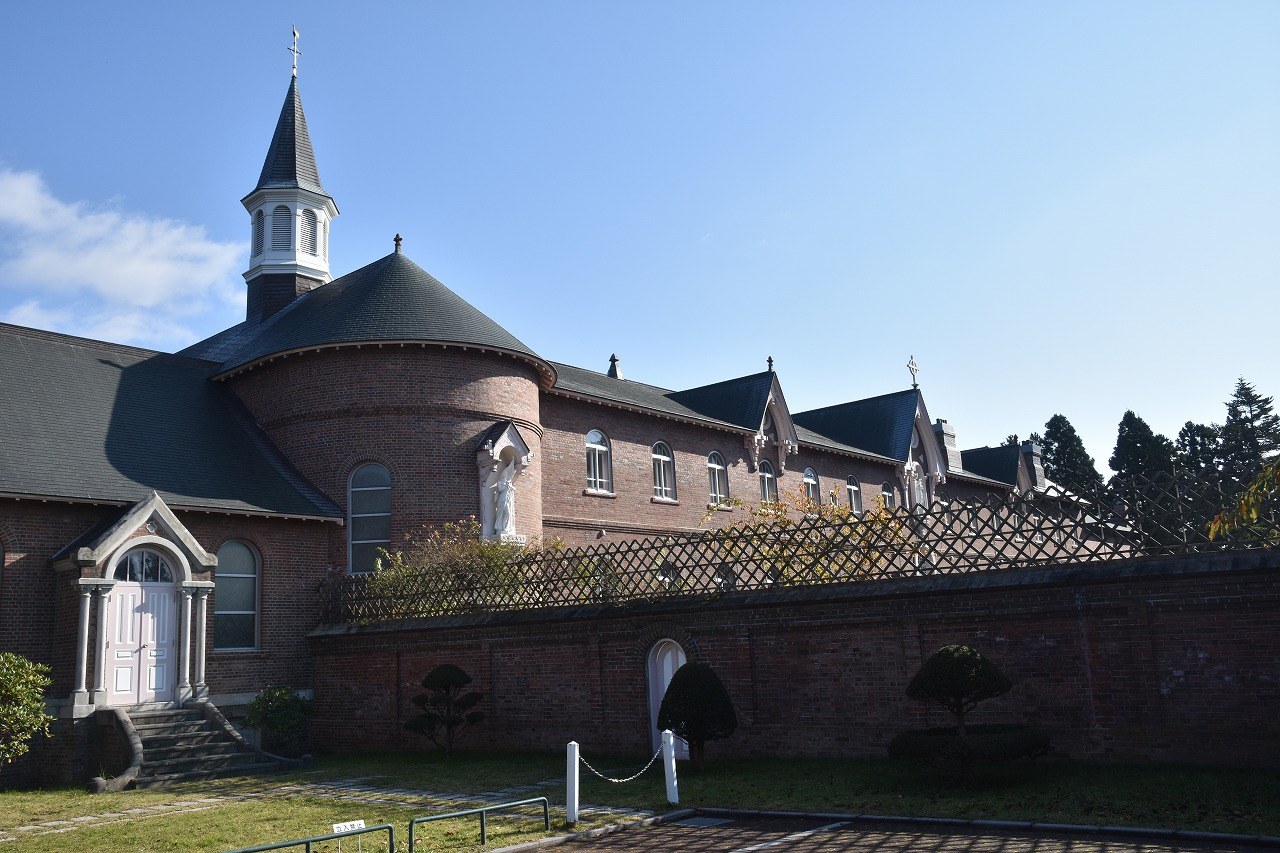
The main building

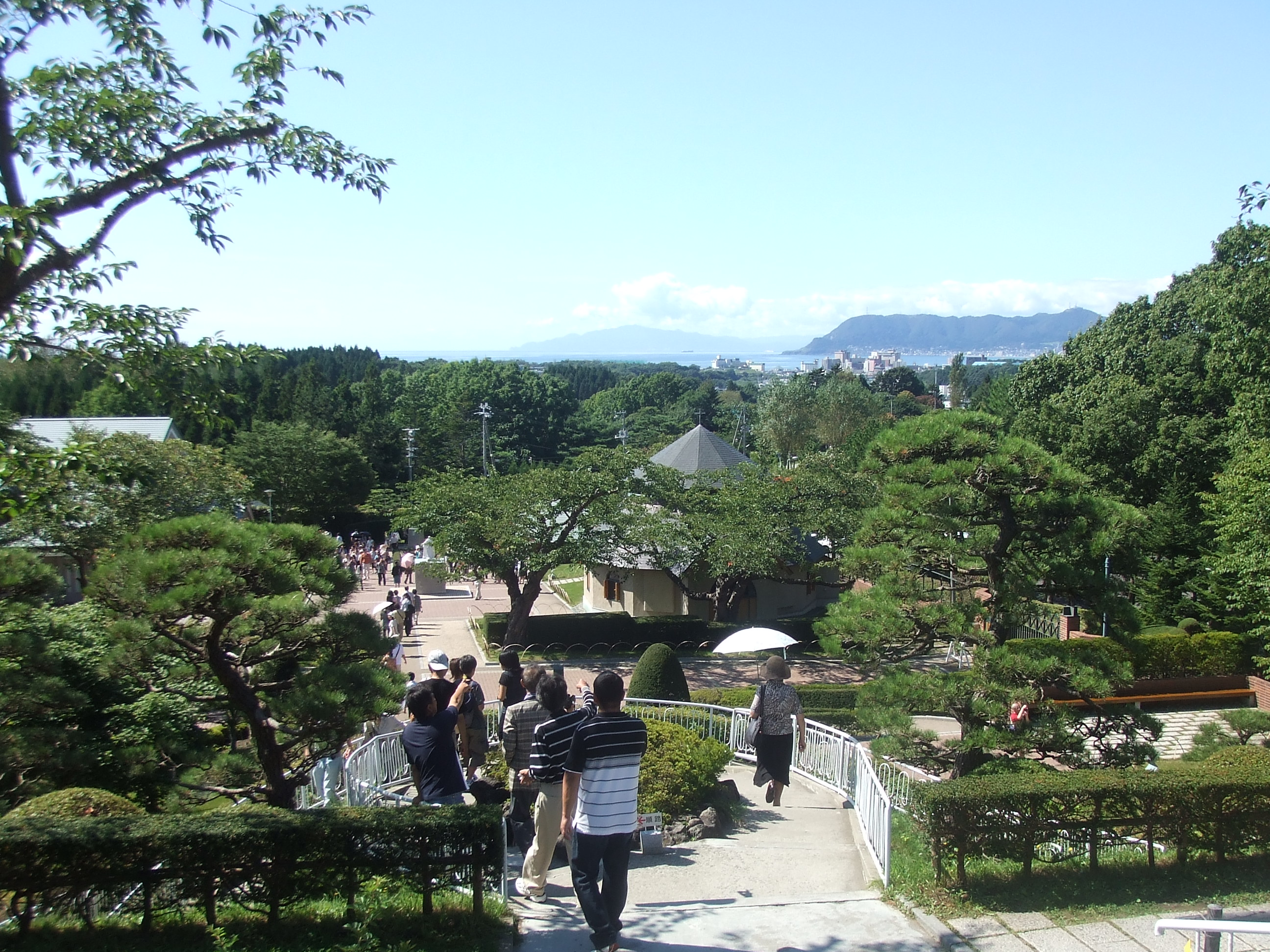
View from the abbey (2008)

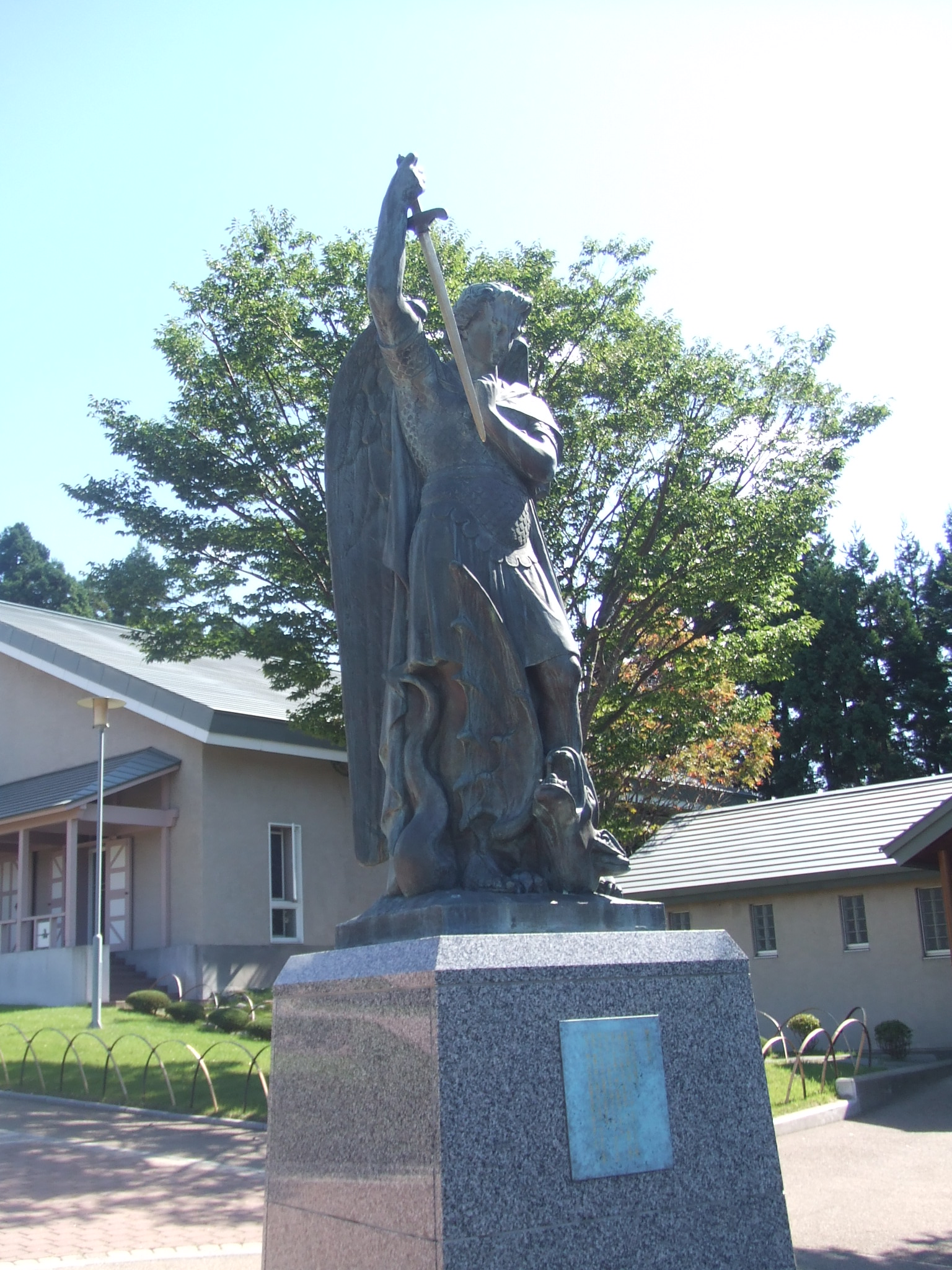
Statue of Michael the Archangel (2008)

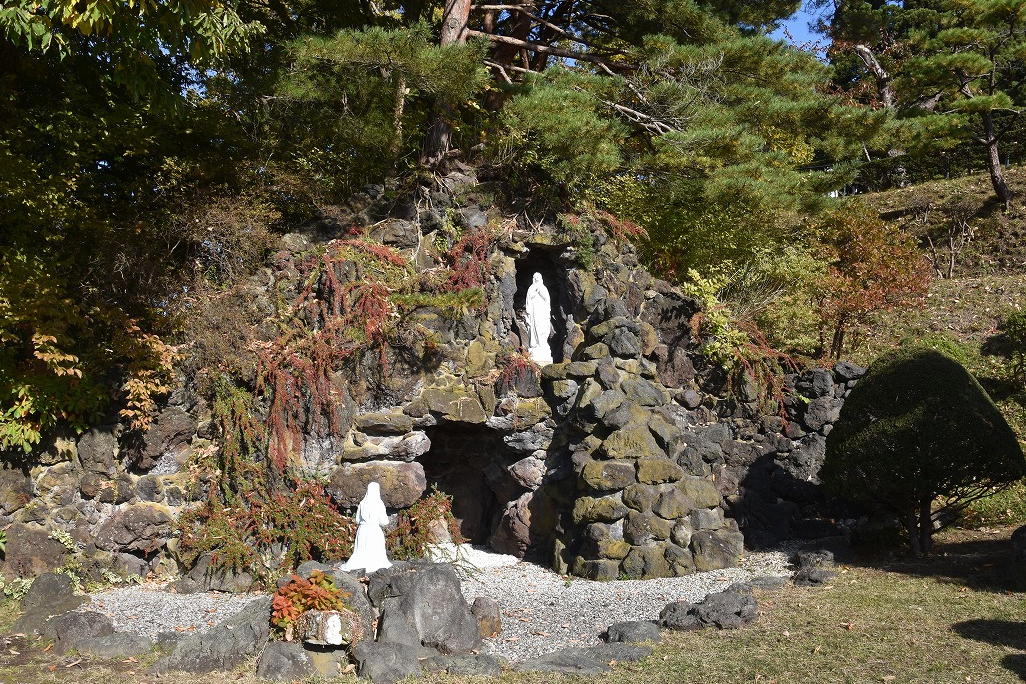
The Lourdes grotto

== See also ==
- Abbey of Fontenay
- トラピスト修道院 (Tobetsu Trappist Monastery)
