= Sainte Thérèse =

Sainte Thérèse or variations may refer to:

== People ==
- A saint named Thérèse or Teresa
- Thérèse Couderc (1805-1895) Marie-Victoire Couderc, Sainte Thérèse, French Catholic nun
- Thérèse of Lisieux (1873-1897) Marie Françoise-Thérèse Martin, Sainte Thérèse, Saint Thérèse of the Child Jesus and the Holy Face, French Catholic nun

== Places ==
=== Canada ===
==== Quebec ====
- Sainte-Thérèse, Quebec, a city and suburb north of Montreal
- Sainte-Thérèse-de-Blainville, Quebec, now called Blainville, a city and suburb north of Montreal
- Sainte-Thérèse-de-la-Gatineau
- Sainte-Thérèse-de-Gaspé
- Saint-Eustache—Sainte-Thérèse (electoral district), a federal riding

==== Ontario ====
(All three places are in Cochrane District)

- Lac-Sainte-Thérèse, a dispersed rural community
- Lac Ste. Thérèse (Lake Ste. Therese), a lake upon which the community lies
- Ste.-Thérèse Creek, a stream that flows into the lake

== Facilities and structures ==
- Sainte-Thérèse station (Exo), Sainte-Thérèse, Quebec, Canada; a commuter rail station
- Sainte-Thérèse Assembly (Saint Therese Plant), a defunct General Motors automotive factory
- Fort Sainte Thérèse, several French colonial era forts on the Richelieu River in Canada, New France
- Séminaire de Sainte-Thérèse, a former seminary campus (now converted into a CEGEP) in Sainte-Thérèse, Quebec, Canada
- Académie Sainte-Thérèse, a French-language private school in des Laurentides, Quebec, Canada
- Clinique Sainte-Thérèse Heliport, and Clinique Sainte-Thérèse; Luxembourg City, Luxembourg; see List of airports in Luxembourg

=== Churches ===
- Church of St. Thérèse of Lisieux (disambiguation)
- Sainte Therese Church, Curepipe, Mauritius
- Sainte-Thérèse-de-l'Enfant-Jésus, Hirson, Aisne, France
- Basilica of Sainte-Thérèse, Lisieux, Calvados, Normandy, France
- Co-Cathedral of St. Therese, Savannakhet, Laos
- Chapelle Saint Joseph & Sainte Thérèse, Dol Cathedral, Dol-de-Bretagne, Brittany, France

== Other uses ==
- Sainte-Thérèse Raid (1760) in Canada, New France

== See also ==
- List of places named after Saint Thérèse of Lisieux
- Therese (name)
- Therese (disambiguation)
- Saint Teresa (disambiguation)
- Santa Teresa (disambiguation)
- Little Flower (disambiguation), for topics about Sainte Therese de Lisieux
