= List of saints named Teresa =

Saints named Theresa include:

- Teresa of Ávila (1515–1582), or Teresa of Jesus, Spaniard, founder of the Discalced Carmelites, and Doctor of the Church
- Teresa Margaret of the Sacred Heart (1747–1770), an Italian Discalced Carmelite
- Theresa of Saint Augustine (1752–1794), Discalced Carmelite and martyr
- Thérèse Couderc (1805–1885), co-founder of the Sisters of the Cenacle
- Maria Teresa of St. Joseph (1855–1938), founder of the Carmelite Daughters of the Divine Heart of Jesus
- Thérèse of Lisieux (1873–1897), or Theresa of the Infant Jesus and of the Holy Face, French Discalced Carmelite nun, and Doctor of the Church
- Teresa Benedicta of the Cross (1891–1942), German Discalced Carmelite
- Teresa of Jesus of Los Andes (1900–1920), Chilean Discalced Carmelite
- Mother Teresa, ("Teresa of Calcutta") (1910–1997), founder of the Missionaries of Charity

== See also ==
- Saint Teresa (disambiguation)
- Santa Teresa (disambiguation)
- Sainte Thérèse (disambiguation)
- Teresa, the feminine given name
- All pages beginning with Saint Teresa, St Teresa or St. Teresa
