= Saint Theresa's College =

Saint Theresa's College may refer to:

== Australia ==
- St. Teresa's College, Abergowrie

== India ==
- St. Teresa's College, Kochi, India

== Philippines ==
- Saint Theresa's College of Cebu
- Saint Theresa's College of Quezon City
- Saint Theresa College of Tandag
- Santa Teresa College, Bauan, Batangas

== Spain ==
- College of Saint Teresa-Ganduxer, Barcelona, Spain

== United States ==
- College of Saint Teresa, Winona, Minnesota

== See also ==
- Saint Teresa (disambiguation)
- Saint Teresa's School (disambiguation)
