= Kowdiar =

- Neighbourhood
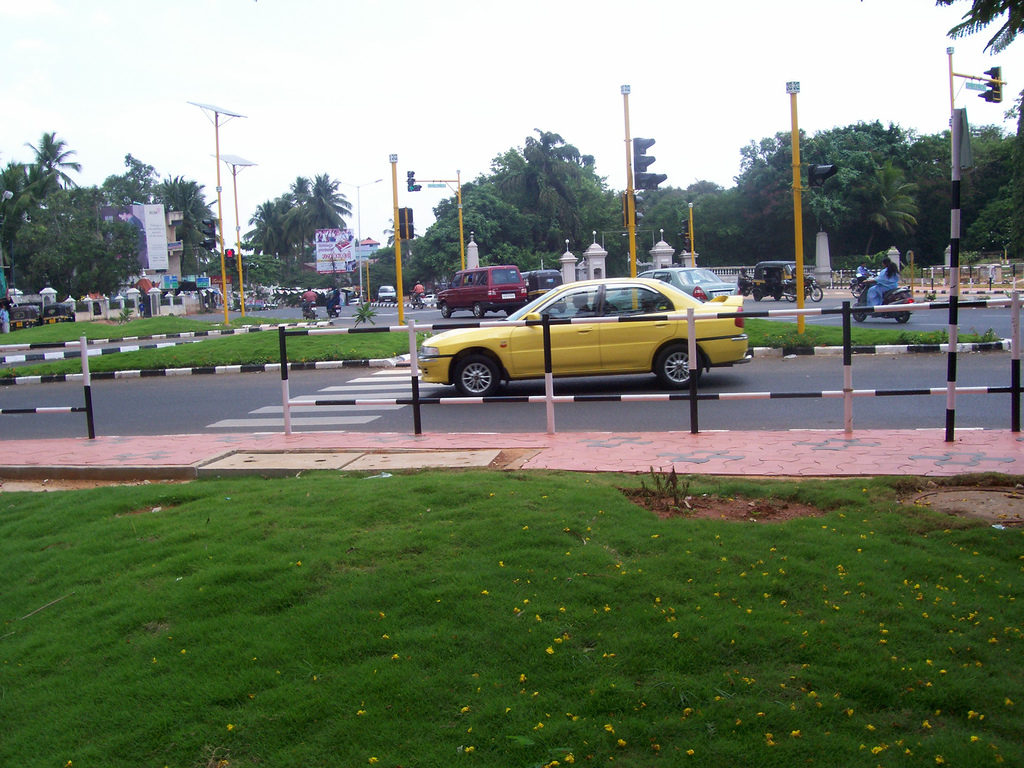

- Location in Kerala, India Kowdiar (India)
- Coordinates: 8.5245°N 76.9599°E
- Country: India
- State: Kerala
- District: Thiruvananthapuram
- Talukas: Thiruvananthapuram

Languages
  - Official: Malayalam, English
- Time zone: UTC+5:30 (IST)
- PIN: 695 003

Kowdiar is one of the main localities in the city of Trivandrum, Kerala, India. It is one of the most expensive and cleanest localities in Trivandrum. It is the starting point of the Rajapatha (Royal Path) that stretches to the East Fort. It lies between the localities of Vellayambalam and Peroorkada- a suburb in the vicinity.

Kowdiar is famous for the Kowdiar Palace. It is generally considered one of the most upmarket residential areas within the city and of late has seen numerous apartment complexes being built. The road to Vellayambalam is wide and well maintained and it is one of the few stretches of straight road in the whole Kerala within city limits.

The arterial roads from the Kowdiar Main Road are:

- Thenmala Road to Peroorkada Junction via Ambalamukku
- Pattom Road to Pattom Junction via Kuravankonam
- PMG TTC Road

The area has a newly renovated park in front of the palace premises with a statue dedicated to Swami Vivekananda.

== Landmarks ==
- Kowdiar Palace
- Raj Bhavan
- Christ Nagar School, Thiruvananthapuram
- Nirmala Bhavan Higher Secondary School

== Nearest transportation hubs ==
- Trivandrum Central Railway Station 6 km
- Trivandrum International Airport 13 km
