= Nirmala Bhavan Higher Secondary School =

Location
- PMG TTC Road, Opp. Kowdiar, Belhaven Gardens, Nanthancodu, Thiruvananthapuram, Kerala 695003; Kowdiar; Thiruvananthapuram, Kerala; India; 8.5184°N 76.9579°E

Information
- School type: private, secondary
- Motto: Where there is love, there is god (സ്നേഹമുള്ളിടത്ത് ദൈവമുണ്ട്)
- Religious affiliation: Roman Catholic
- Founded: 1964
- School code: 01100
- Principal: Sr.Lins Alackal
- Gender: Co-ed (Boys & Girls)
- Language: English
- Song: O spotless home of light and peace
- Affiliations: Sisters of the Adoration of the Blessed Sacrament
- Website: official website

Nirmala Bhavan Higher Secondary School, founded in 1964, is a mixed school run by the Sisters of the Adoration of the Blessed Sacrament (S.A.B.S) in Thiruvananthapuram. This religious congregation was founded in 1908 by the first Bishop of Changanacherry, Mar Thomas Kurialachery.

The school is a minority institution, recognized as such by the Government of Kerala. It is an unaided English medium School and prepares students for the ten year Secondary School Leaving certificate (S.S.L.C) examination of the Kerala State Educational Board and two years Higher Secondary examination course of Higher Secondary Education Directorate.

== SMART class ==
For the first time in Kerala, the school, following the state syllabus, is equipped with SMART CLASS facilities. The program enables the teacher to use digital resources such as graphics, animations, 3D images and video clips in addition to the chalk and talk method of teaching. All class rooms have an Ethernet network, governed by a Knowledge Center within the school campus. The knowledge center is equipped with a library of digital resources mapped to the school syllabus. This program was inaugurated in the school by the Minister for Education, Shri M.A. Baby in June 2006.
