= Little Flower =

Little Flower may refer to:

== People ==
- Thérèse of Lisieux, (1873-1897), a saint of the Catholic Church, popularly known in English as the "Little Flower of Jesus", or simply the "Little Flower"
- Fiorello La Guardia (1882-1947), mayor of New York, nicknamed "Little Flower"

== Arts and entertainment ==
- Little Flower (film), a 1979 Chinese movie starring Joan Chen
- Little Flowers, a 2010 Canadian short film
- "Little Flower", a song by The Wildhearts from the 2019 album Renaissance Men

=== Religious facilities ===
- Basilica of the National Shrine of the Little Flower, in San Antonio, Texas, US
- National Shrine of the Little Flower Basilica, in Royal Oak, Michigan, US
- Church of the Little Flower (Coral Gables, Florida), US
- Little Flower Church, Kaprassery, India
- Little Flower Mission, Alice Springs, Australia

=== Schools ===
- Little Flower Academy, Vancouver, B.C., Canada
- Little Flower College, Guruvayoor, Thissur, India
- Little Flower High School (disambiguation)
- Little Flower Junior College, Hyderabad, India
- Little Flower School (disambiguation)

== Other uses ==
- Little Flower, Indianapolis, Indiana, a neighborhood in the United States
- Little Flower Hospital, Agamaly, Kerala, India

== See also ==
- Flower (disambiguation)
- Little (disambiguation)
- Sainte Thérèse (disambiguation)
- List of places named after Saint Thérèse of Lisieux
