= Little Flower School =

Little Flower School may refer to:

- Little Flower School, Imphal, Manipur, India
- Little Flower School, Mudinepalli, English Medium school in Mudinepalli
- Willes Little Flower School, school in Dhaka, Bangladesh

== See also ==
- Little Flower High School (disambiguation)
- Little Flower (disambiguation)
