= Thérèse Chardin =

French hairstylist

Thérèse Chardin is a French hairstylist who was a celebrity in the 1960s and 1970s.

After working as a model, her talent as a hairstylist was noticed by Elle fashion editor Claude Brouet and Nina Ricci's designer Gérard Pipart. She then opened her hair salon on the Champs-Élysées in Paris where she welcomed stars and royalty. As a fashion celebrity, magazines in France and Italy would photograph her for their editorials and brands, such as L'Oréal, would run advertising campaigns using her name the L'Oréal commercial. Chardin then launched a line of wigs and extended her brand to fashion jewelry, sold in a corner of department store LE PRINTEMPS, and fashion accessories.

Chardin has worked for the international editions of Vogue, Elle, and Marie Claire, working with photographers such as Guy Bourdin, Frank Horvat, Jean-Lou Sieff, David Bailey, Bob Richardson, Helmut Newton, Patrick Demarchelier and Sacha. She started working again in the late 80s mostly in New York City with Melka Treanton. In 2020 her name appears alongside the reproduction of editorials at the Vogue Paris Retrospective 1020-2020 at the Palais Galliera in Paris.

== Works ==
Her work is celebrated in many books which include:

- Vogue en Beauté
- "Costume Jewelry for Haute Couture"
- "Marie Claire Hair" and Bob Richardson.
