= St. Theresa's Church, Haining =

- 圣女小德肋撒天主堂
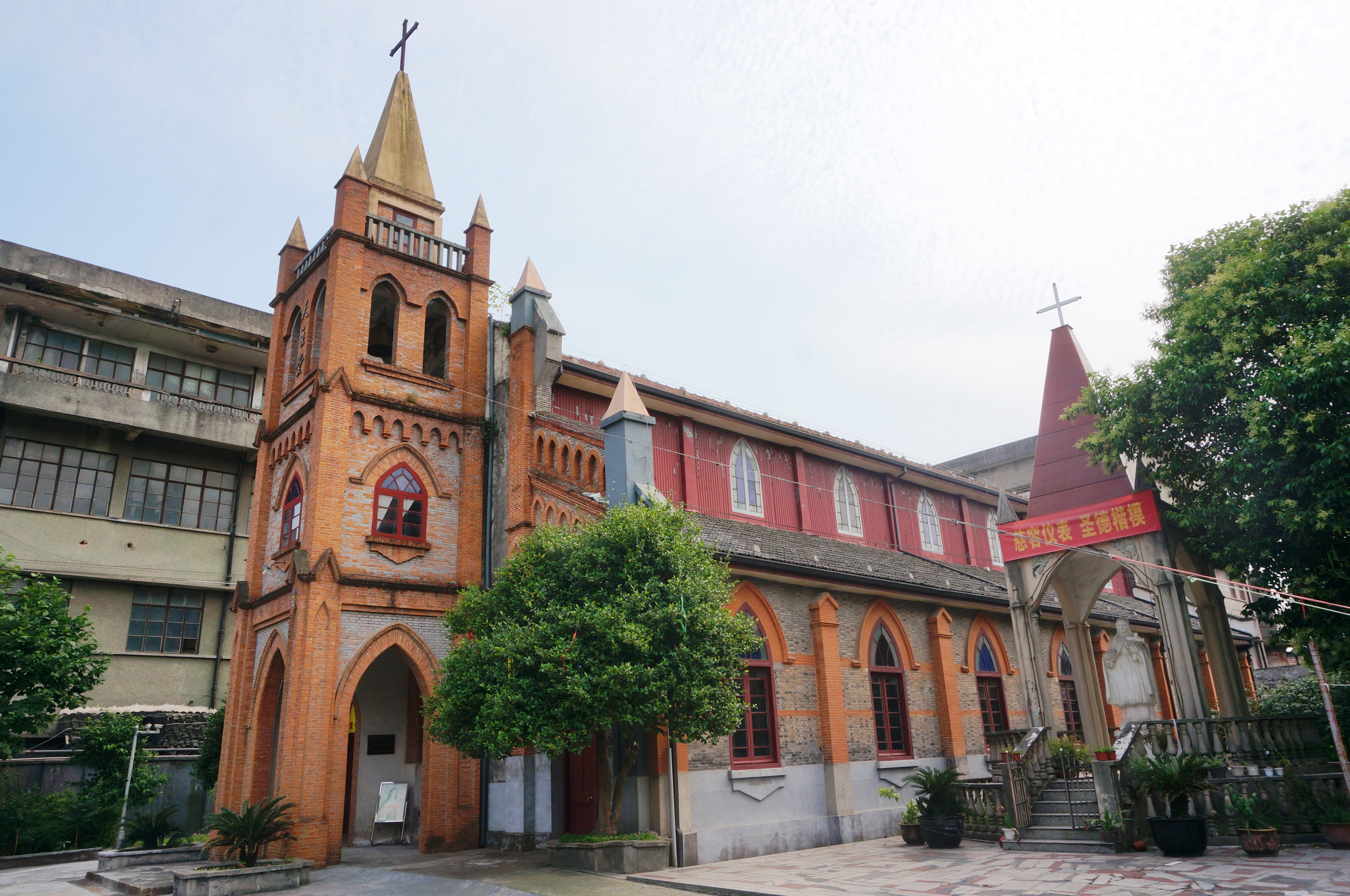
- St. Theresa's Church, Haining in 2017

- Location in Zhejiang
- 30°27′52″N 120°27′30″E
- Location: Haining, Zhejiang, China
- Denomination: Roman Catholic

History
- Status: Church
- Founded: 1929

Architecture
- Functional status: Active
- Architectural type: Church building
- Style: Gothic architecture

Specifications
- Materials: Granite, bricks

Administration
- Archdiocese: Roman Catholic Archdiocese of Hangzhou

Chinese name
- Simplified Chinese: 圣女小德肋撒天主堂
- Traditional Chinese: 聖女小德肋撒天主堂
Transcriptions
Standard Mandarin
- Hanyu Pinyin: Shèngnǚ Xiǎodélèsà Tiānzhǔtáng

St. Theresa's Church, Haining (Chinese: 圣女小德肋撒天主堂) is a Roman Catholic church located in the town of Chang'an, Haining, Zhejiang, China.

== History ==
The church was originally built in 1929 by Chinese believers and belonged to the Roman Catholic Archdiocese of Hangzhou.

In January 2017, it was declared a provincial cultural relic preservation organ by the Zhejiang government.

== Architecture ==
The church is seven rooms wide with a Gothic style. It has a 17-metre (56 ft) high bell tower.
