= Kowdiar Palace =

Residence of Travancore Royal Family

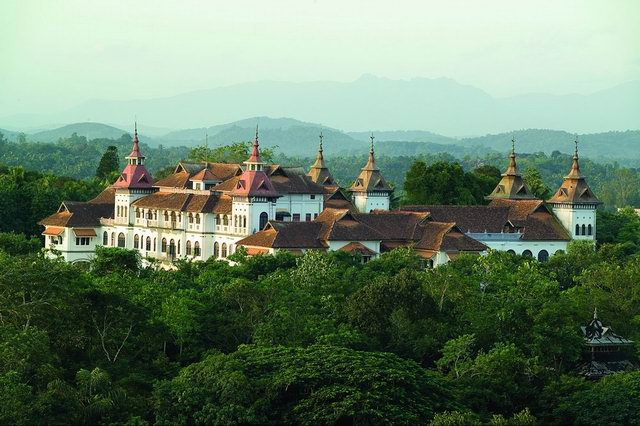
- Distant view of Kowdiar palace

General information
- Type: Palace
- Architectural style: Kerala style
- Location: Kowdiar, Thiruvananthapuram, India
- Coordinates: 8°31′26″N 76°57′47″E
- Completed: 1934
- Owner: Travancore Royal Family

Other information
- Number of rooms: Over 150

Kowdiar Palace is the official residence of the Travancore Royal Family, situated in Thiruvananthapuram, Kerala, India.The Kowdiar Palace, a regal residence was built by the Maharaja, Sri Chithira Thirunal. The Palace in its present form was completed in 1934, the year his only sister Karthika Thirunal Lakshmi Bayi married G V Raja.

After the Constitutional Amendment of 1971, the properties and estates of the royal family were partitioned and divided equally among the branches of the two Travancore Queens, Sethu Lakshmi Bayi and Sethu Parvathi Bayi. This Palace belongs to the heirs of Sethu Parvathi Bayi as it was built by her son Maharajah Sree Chithira Thirunal.

Kowdiar Palace's architectural work is famous and has over 150 rooms. The entry to this palace is restricted as it is the private residence of the royal family settled in Thiruvananthapuram.

== See also ==
- Travancore Royal Family
- Princely State
- Vellayambalam
