= St. Theresa of Avila Catholic Church, Gonzales =

Coordinates: 30°14′25.5″N 90°55′13″W

St. Theresa
- St. Theresa of Avila Catholic Church
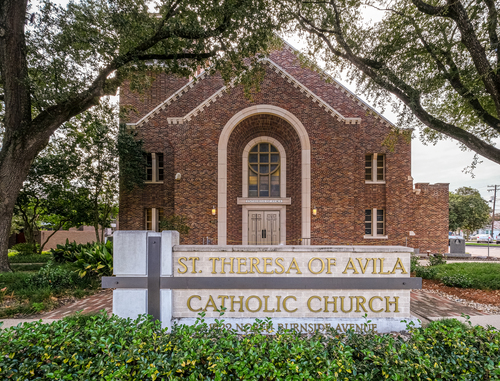
- Exterior of Church Building
- St. Theresa
- Location: Gonzales, Louisiana
- Denomination: Catholic
- Website: www.st-theresa-of-avila.com

Administration
- Diocese: Diocese of Baton Rouge

Clergy
- Priest: Fr. Matthew McConahay

St. Theresa Of Avila Catholic Church is a church parish located in downtown Gonzales, Louisiana, United States. Under its present name, the parish was officially established in 1918.

== History ==
The history of St. Theresa goes back to the 1840s. The only two chapels in the area were in Donaldsonville, Louisiana across the Mississippi River and in St. Gabriel, Louisiana at the St. Gabriel Catholic Church. The settlers had to cross the river or make the long journey on horse or wagon to these churches. It was known that a new church was needed. The new church was built in Cornerview near Gonzales, Louisiana. This church was renamed Sacred Heart at Cornerview. As the town's population grew the railroad line from Baton Rouge to New Orleans expanded, and River Road and the new Airline Highway cut through Gonzales, a declaration was made to transfer the church from Cornerview to Gonzales. The Cornerview church parishioners signed a protest letter to Archbishop James H. Blenk SM of New Orleans. A new church was then built at the same site near the L and R railroad tracks in downtown Gonzales. It was renamed to St. Theresa upon the request of a benefactor. This church was completely built by parishioners and was thought of as "the ugliest church ever." The parishioners wanted a new church as the steeple was about to fall down. A new church was built in the midst of World War II and is the church that stands today. In 1959 a catholic school was built behind the church building. The school is under the same name as the church. After its construction in 1959, the building has been added on to and changed with the additions of a library in 1981, a gym in 1992, a science and computer lab in 2002, and expansion of the front office in 2023l. Another campus was built in Prairieville in 2003. It hosts pre-k through 3rd grades while St. Theresa hosts 4th through 8th grades. The current principals are Micah Ballow.

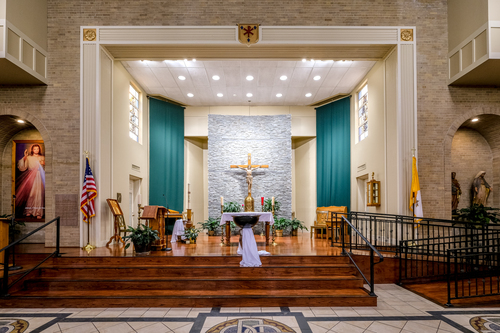
The Altar of the church
