= St. Theresa's Cathedral =

St. Theresa's Cathedral may refer to:

- Cathedral of Saint Theresa of Lisieu, Bermuda
- St. Theresa's Cathedral, Caxias do Sul, Brazil
- St. Theresa's Cathedral, Changchun, China
- St. Theresa of the Child Jesus Cathedral, Urawa, Japan
- St. Theresa Cathedral, Juba, South Sudan
- Co-Cathedral of Saint Theresa of the Child Jesus (Honolulu, Hawaii), United States

== See also ==
- St. Theresa Church (disambiguation)
- St. Teresa of Avila Cathedral (disambiguation)
