= Lok Bhavan, Thiruvananthapuram =

Official residence of the Governor of Kerala

Lok Bhavan, Kerala

General information
- Architectural style: Traditional Kerala
- Location: Thiruvananthapuram, India
- Coordinates: 8.5156°N 76.9632°E
- Client: Governor of Kerala

Technical details
- Floor area: 22,000 sq ft (2,000 m^{2})

Design and construction
- Architect: Travancore Royal Maramath

Lok Bhavan formerly Raj Bhavan (translation: King's House) is the official residence of the governor of Kerala Om Prakash Mathur. It is located in the capital city of Thiruvananthapuram, Kerala. Built in 1829 as Palace Guest house of Travancore Government Guest, this heritage structure hosts the present governor of Kerala, Om Prakash Mathur.

== History ==
The Kerala Lok Bhavan was originally constructed by Royal Government of Travancore as a guest palace to accommodate state guests and heads of states while on their official visits to Thiruvananthapuram. For a brief period from 1914 to 1918, the palace was used as War Office of Travancore Army and state armed forces during World War I. During this period, the palace was also the official residence of General Chief of Staff of Travancore Army. For a brief period from 1919 to 1937, the palace was again converted as a guest palace after commissioning of Kowdiar Palace, the royal residence of Travancore Maharajas. From 1937 onwards, the building became guest house of University of Travancore used by various foreign faculties and guest professors.

When Kerala was formed in 1957, there were three Raj Bhavan, the Bolgatty Palace of Ernakulam, Devikulam Palace of Munnar (Summer Palace of Travancore Maharajas) and Thiruvananthapuram Raj Bhavan. However, the Government of Kerala later decided to do away with former two Raj Bhavans by converting Bolgatty Palace into a heritage hotel and Devikulam Palace as Government Guest House.

== Complex and building ==
Built in the Kerala traditional style, the main building of the Lok Bhavan has certain architectural features such as high ceiled, spacious rooms with large windows and doors, with a tinge of Victorian finish. Constructed atop a breezy hillock, it is surrounded by sprawling meadows, velvety lawns, green houses with many species of Anthurium, Orchid, etc. There is also an enchanting fountain at the centre of the main lawn facing the office room of the Governor.

There are 3 major structures, with the main building being the oldest and heritage complex. The main structure is of 22,000 sqft built up space has 3 large halls, a state banquet hall, conference hall, Governor's office, Governor's Secretariat, department offices, conference room and a large library. The East Wing houses Governor's private residence with 18 suites and rooms for personal staff, apart from private dining room and Kitchen. The West Wing houses residences of chief officers, guest rooms and a mini-museum. The Chitra Thirunal Hall, located in West wing, is used for all state ceremonies. A ball room exists in west wing where the New Year celebrations and Onam, Pongal, etc. celebrations are conducted in Raj Bhavan.

=== Lok Bhavan Library ===
Kerala Lok Bhavan has one of the largest private collections of books among other Lok Bhavans of India. The Lok Bhavan has a good library of about six thousand books on a variety of interesting topics. The Public Relations Section is in charge of the Library. The books have been indexed and neatly displayed on shelves.

=== Exteriors ===
With an area of 3.24 hectares, Raj Bhavan Gardens is the centre of attraction to the visitors. The trimmed grass gives the lawn a look of a green carpet spread out, and the artificial water fall, and the three green houses add to the charm of the gardens. Dendrobium, Aranda, Catlia, Arachnis, Moecara, Vanda and Dove orchid grace it. A good collection of Rose and Bigonia are also there. The beautiful statues brought in from Mayiladi, near Sucheendram, Tamil Nadu and placed at appropriate points contribute to the charm of the Kerala Raj Bhavan Gardens. There are also two impressive Band Stands built in regal style, besides a Children's Park, Tennis Court and a Shuttle Court on the premise. The lawn hosts the annual At Home ceremonies during Independence and Republic days.

=== Other structures ===
Also situated in the campus are the 71 Quarters for the Officers and Staff of Kerala Raj Bhavan (the quarters of ADC are situated in the Raj Bhavan - Kowdiar road), Raj Bhavan Dispensary, Office of the Electrical Wing and the Raj Bhavan Employees Co-operative Society. There is a post office exclusively for Raj Bhavan named "The Kerala Governor’s Camp Post Office", where there are facilities for sending speed post, telegrams etc. A security office with 40 security officials and 20 special branch officials are posted.

== See also ==
- British Residency
- Government Houses of the British Indian Empire
