= Santa Teresa =

Santa Teresa may refer to:

== People ==
- One of several saints named Teresa
- Saint Teresa of Ávila
- Saint Teresa of Calcutta
- Saint Teresa of Los Andes
- Saint Teresa Benedicta of the Cross
- Saint Thérèse of Lisieux
- Saint Teresa Margaret of the Sacred Heart
- Teresa Urrea also known as Santa Teresa

== Places ==
=== Argentina ===
- Santa Teresa, Santa Fe, a town in the southern end of Santa Fe Province

=== Australia ===
- Santa Teresa, Northern Territory, a city and Aboriginal community

=== Belize ===
- Santa Teresa, Belize, a village in Toledo District

=== Brazil ===
- Santa Teresa, Espírito Santo, Brazil
- Santa Teresa, Rio de Janeiro, a neighborhood in the city of Rio de Janeiro, Brazil

=== Costa Rica ===
- Santa Teresa, Costa Rica

=== Italy ===
- Santa Teresa, Erice

=== Nicaragua ===
- Santa Teresa, Carazo

=== Peru ===
- Santa Teresa, near Aguas Calientes, Peru

=== United States ===
- Santa Teresa, New Mexico
- Santa Teresa, San Jose, California
  - Santa Teresa (VTA), a light rail station in the neighborhood
  - Santa Teresa Hills, a mountain range in the neighborhood
  - Santa Teresa County Park, a county park in the neighborhood
  - Rancho Santa Teresa, a Mexican land grant which gives the neighborhood its name
  - Santa Teresa High School, a public high school in the neighborhood

=== Uruguay ===
- Santa Teresa National Park, Rocha

=== Venezuela ===
- Santa Teresa del Tuy, Miranda

== Other uses ==
- Fortaleza de Santa Teresa, a military fortification in Rocha, Uruguay
- Santa Teresa CD, a women's football club from Badajoz, Extremadura, Spain
- Santa Teresa dam, on the Spanish river Tormes
- Santa Teresa, the zanpakutō held by Nnoitra Jiruga in the Japanese manga series Bleach
- "Santa Teresa", a track by guitarist Ed O'Brien
- Santa Teresa rum

== See also ==
- Teresa (disambiguation)
- Saint Teresa (disambiguation)
- Sainte Thérèse (disambiguation)
