= Kretinga Lourdes Grotto =

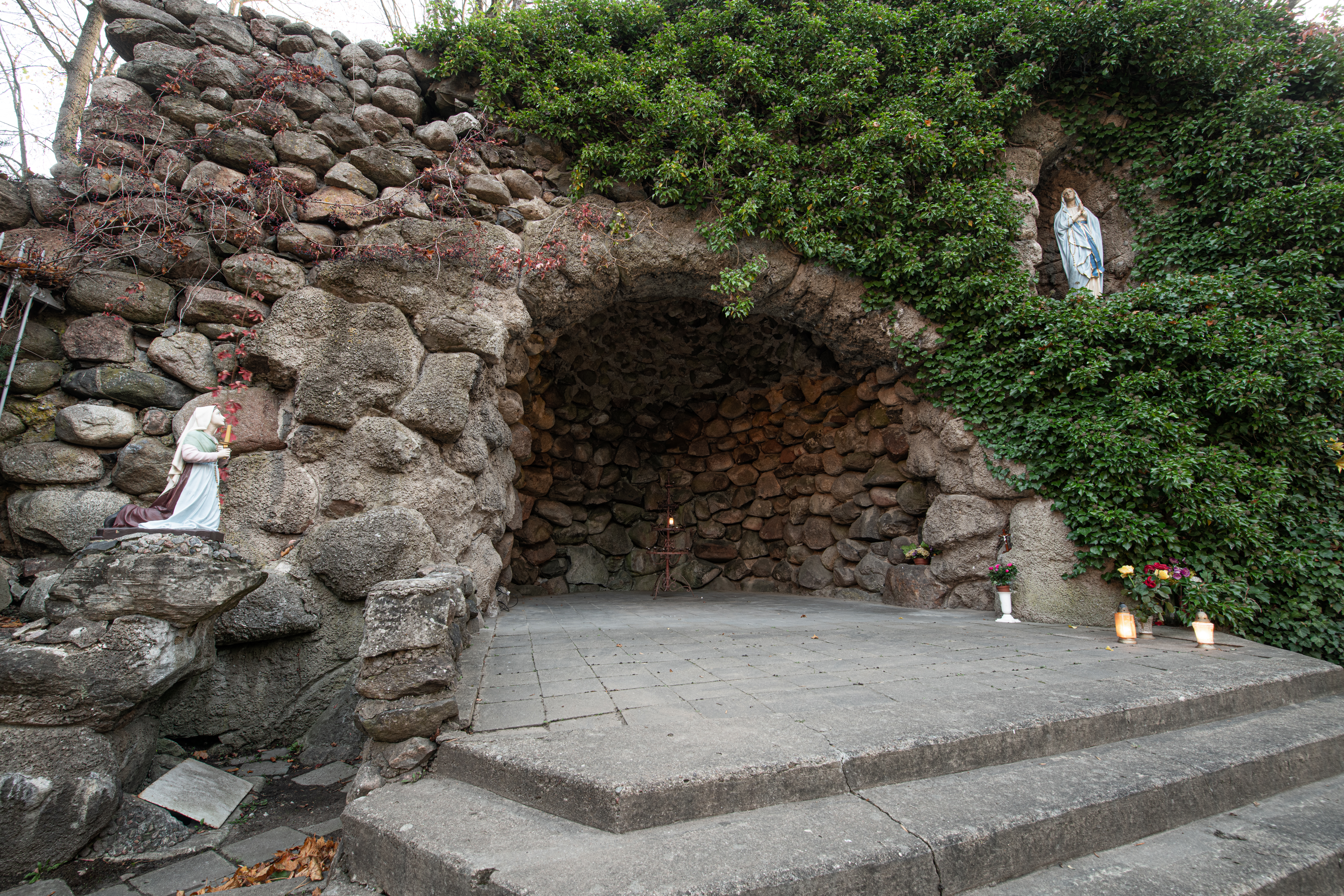
- Interactive map of the Kretinga Lourdes Grotto area

General information
- Location: Kretinga, Lithuania
- Coordinates: 55.892731°N 21.243504°E

Website
- www.

One of the main symbols of Kretinga Town – the Lourdes Grotto replica dedicated to the Virgin Mary – was opened on 2 August 1933, in the presence of the then President of the Republic of Lithuania, Antanas Smetona, the Minister of Defence, Balys Giedraitis, and 25 thousand believers from all over Lithuania.

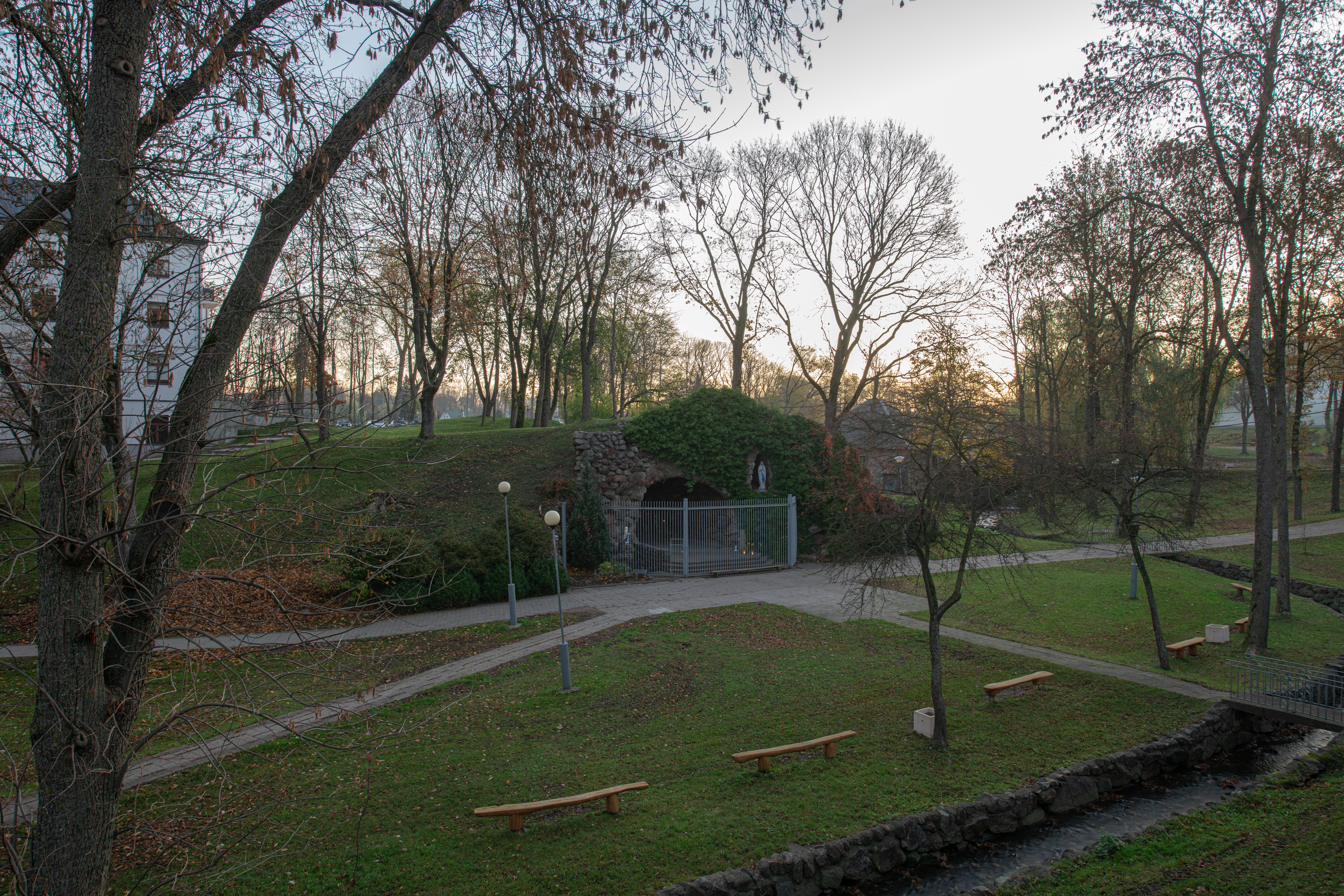

== History ==
The idea behind the creation of the grotto was to celebrate the 75th anniversary of the Virgin Mary’s apparition in Lourdes, France. A priest, Augustinas Dirvelė, thought of creating a grotto in Kretinga, in the valley of the Dopultis (Pastauninkas) Stream, and the statue of Our Lady of Lourdes was placed on the high opening of the grotto near a monastery. On the other, lower side of the grotto, a statue of kneeling St. Bernadette holding a candle looks up at the Virgin Mary. Both statues were brought to Kretinga from France.

In 1941, when the German army arrived in the town, Lourdes became the site of a massacre. A decade later, the grotto was halfway buried by an order from the Soviet government, and in 1952, the Lourdes Grotto was destroyed. However, the local residents managed to preserve the sculptures and transport them to the church. Later, the Virgin Mary’s Square next to the grotto was turned into a military exercise area. In 1989, the residents of Kretinga tidied up the Lourdes Grotto – they cleaned up the stream, built new paths, planted trees and returned the statues. Lourdes of Kretinga is one of the most important symbols of the town’s history, religious culture and architectural heritage. Presently, the Kretinga Town celebrations, educational events and parish festivals all take place here.

== Gallery ==
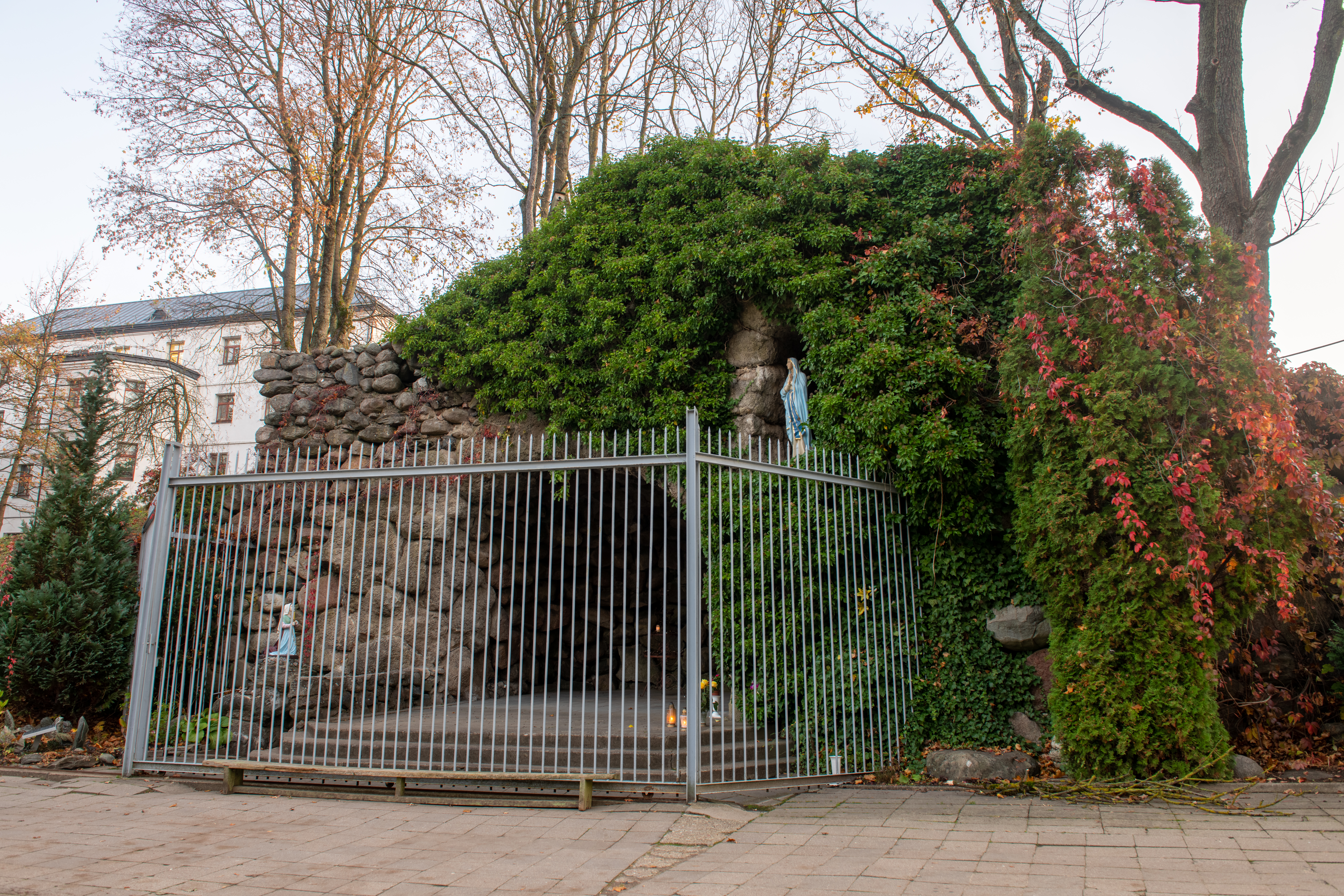

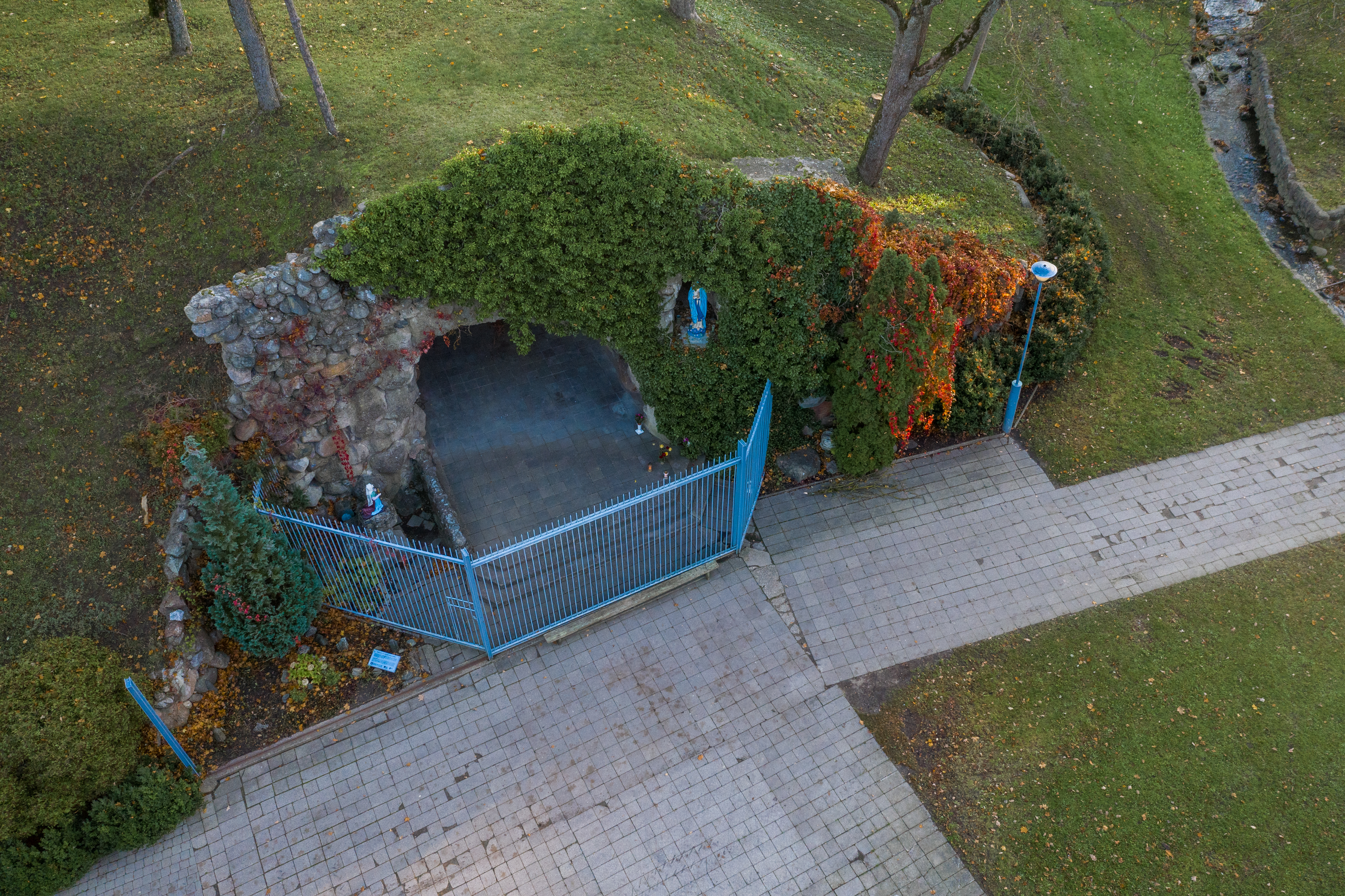

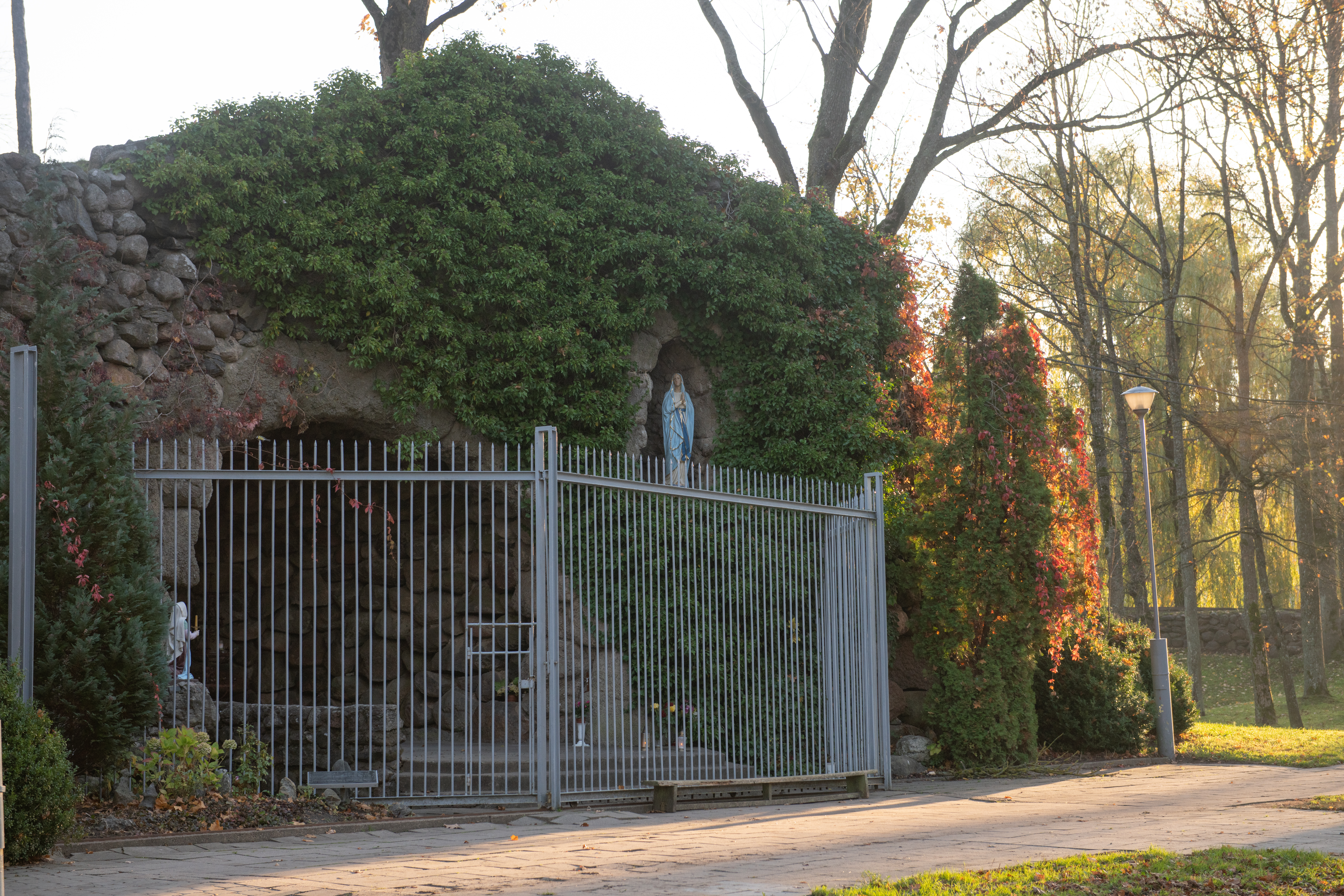

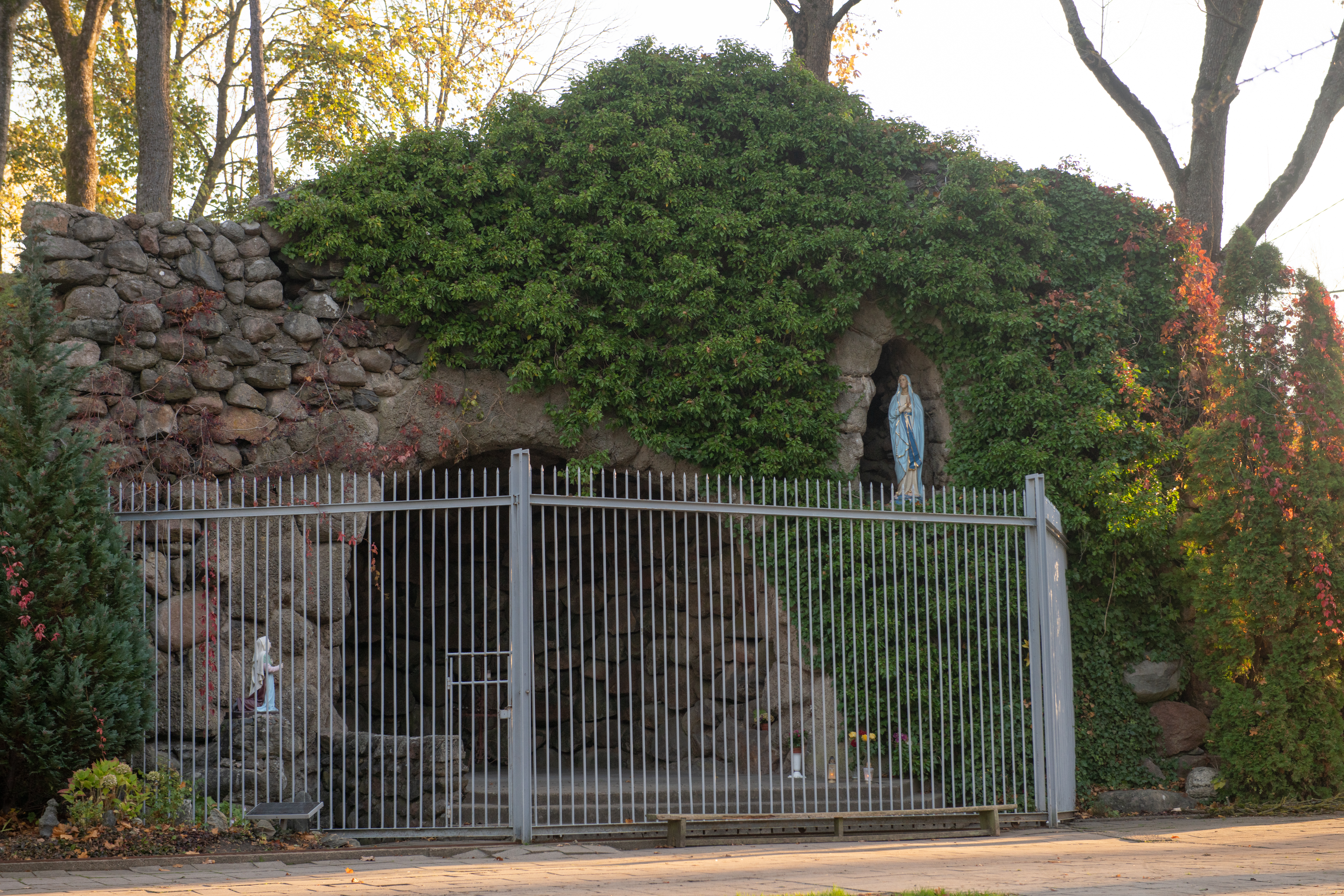
