= Saint Teresa's School =

Saint Teresa's School or Saint Theresa's School may refer to:

== Canada ==
- St. Teresa Catholic Elementary School, New Toronto
- St. Theresa Catholic Secondary School, Belleville, Ontario
- St. Teresa's School, St. John’s, Newfoundland and Labrador

== Hong Kong ==
- St. Teresa's School Kowloon
- St. Teresa Secondary School, Kowloon

== India ==
- St. Teresa's High School, Charni Road, Mumbai
- St. Theresa’s Boys High School, Bandra, Mumbai
- St. Teresa's Secondary School, Kidderpore, Kolkata, West Bengal
- St Theresa’s School, Bendur, Mangalore

== United Kingdom ==
- St Teresa's School Effingham, England
- St. Teresa's Primary School, Lurgan, County Armagh, Northern Ireland
- St. Teresa's Primary School, Mountnorris, County Armagh, Northern Ireland
- St Theresa's Catholic Primary School, Sheffield, England

== United States ==
- St. Teresa's Academy, Kansas City, Missouri
- Saint Teresa of Avila School, Norristown, Pennsylvania
- St. Teresa High School (Decatur, Illinois)
- Santa Teresa High School, San Jose, California
- St. Theresa School (Coral Gables, Florida)

== Elsewhere ==
- St. Teresa's National Secondary School, Kuching, Sarawak, Malaysia
- St Teresa's School (Karori), New Zealand
- Ibenga Girls Secondary School, Zambia, founded in 1963 as St. Theresa's Secondary School

== See also ==
- St. Teresa's Academy, a Catholic, independent secondary school for girls in Kansas City, Missouri, United States
- Saint Theresa's College (disambiguation)
