= St. Lucy's Church (Bronx) =

Church in the Bronx, New York

Coordinates: 40°51′48.69″N 73°51′44.2″W

The Church of St. Lucy
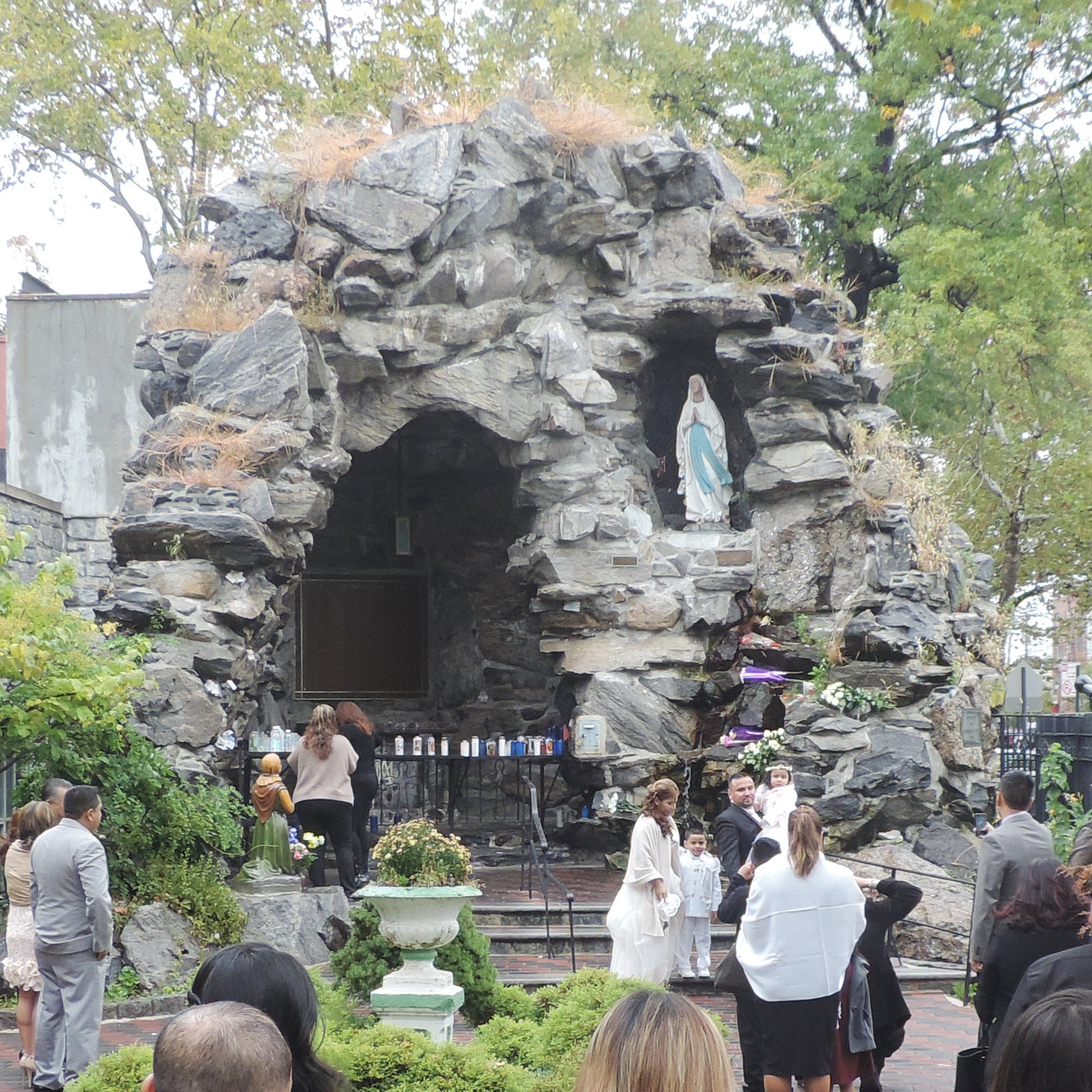
- Grotto
- The Church of St. Lucy
- Location: The Bronx, New York City
- Country: United States of America
- Denomination: Roman Catholic

The Church of St. Lucy is a Roman Catholic parish church under the authority of the Roman Catholic Archdiocese of New York. It is located at 833 Mace Avenue in the Allerton neighborhood of the Bronx in New York City. The parish was established in 1927.

== Lourdes of America ==
Lourdes of America on Bronxwood Avenue is a stone grotto on the grounds of St. Lucy's built in 1939 as a replica of the Shrine at Lourdes.
