= St. Theresa Church, Perambur =

Church in Tamil Nadu, India

St. Theresa Church
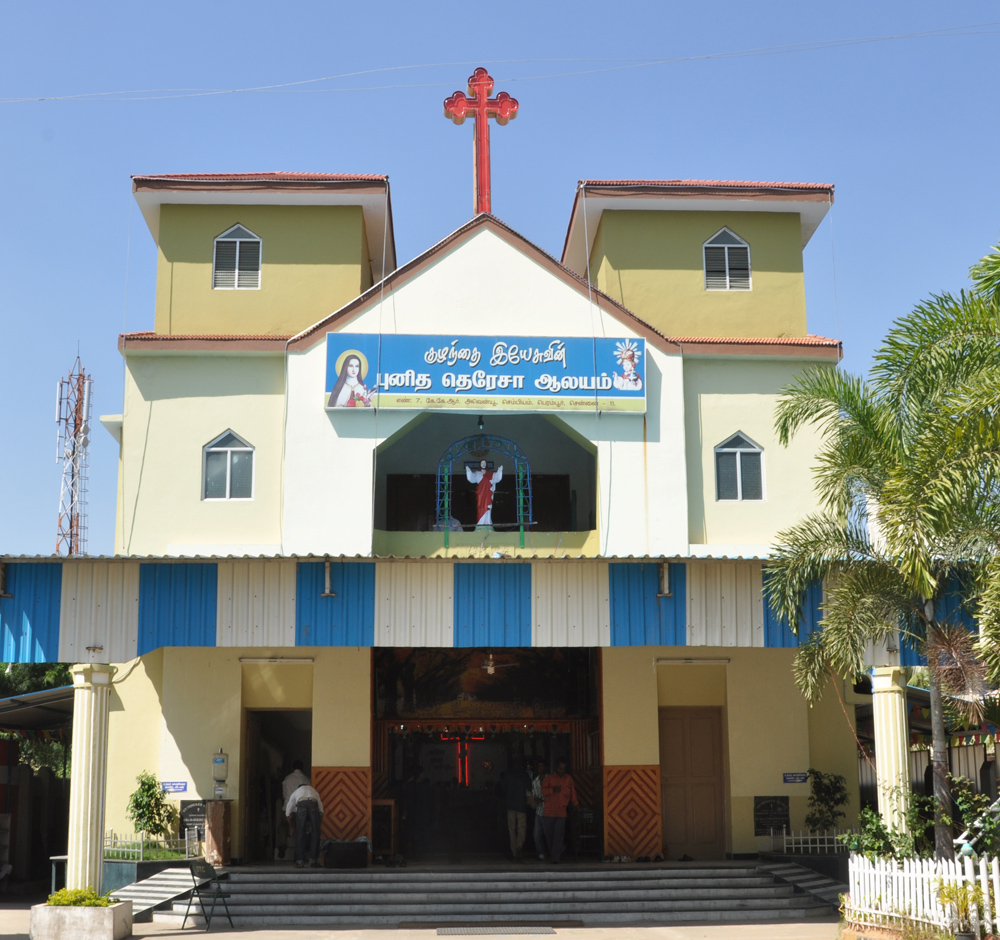
- Front view of the Church

Religion
- Affiliation: Roman Catholic
- Diocese: Chennai
- Region: Christian
- Rite: Latin Rite
- Ecclesiastical or organizational status: Church
- Year consecrated: 2001 (15 August)
- Status: Functional

Location
- Location: Perambur,
- Municipality: Chennai North
- State: Tamil Nadu
- Interactive map of St. Theresa Church
- Coordinates: 13.122191°N 80.240214°E

Architecture
- Style: Modern

Website
- St.Theresa Church, Perambur

St.Theresa Church is a Catholic church under the jurisdiction of the Archdiocese of Madras-Mylapore (Chennai-Mylai) in Tamil Nadu, India, in Sembiam division of Perambur, Chennai. Approximately 900 families have the membership in this Catholic parish. Many people from various parts of Chennai make pilgrimage to this church for the devotion of Infant Jesus.

== Saint Theresa ==
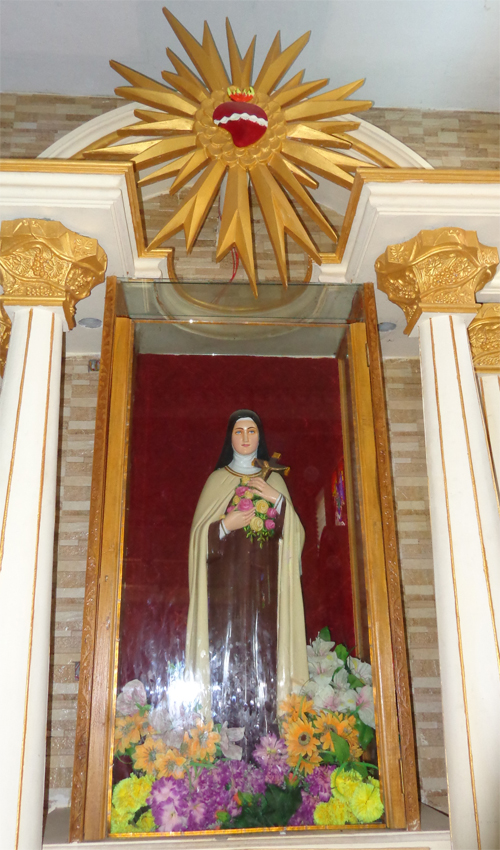

Saint Theresa is the Patron saint of Sembiam Church parishioners. She is also known as St.Thérèse of Child Jesus. She was born at Alençon, France, 2 January 1873; died at Lisieux 30 September 1897. When she was fifteen she applied for permission to enter the Carmelite Convent, and being refused by the superior, went to Rome with her father, as eager to give her to God as she was to give herself, to seek the consent of Pope Leo XIII, then celebrating his jubilee. He preferred to leave the decision in the hands of the superior, who finally consented and on 9 April 1888, at the unusual age of fifteen, Thérèse Martin entered the convent of Lisieux where two of her sisters had preceded her. The account of the eleven years of her religious life, marked by signal graces and constant growth in holiness, is given by Soeur Thérèse in her autobiography, written in obedience to her superior and published two years after her death. In 1901 it was translated into English, and in 1912 another translation, the first complete edition of the life of the Servant of God, containing the autobiography, "Letters and Spiritual Counsels", was published. Its success was immediate and it has passed into many editions, spreading far and wide the devotion to this "little" saint of simplicity, and abandonment in God's service, of the perfect accomplishment of small duties. The fame of her sanctity and the many miracles performed through her intercession caused the introduction of her cause of canonization only seventeen years after her death, 10 June 1914. Thérèse was beatified on 29 April 1923 and canonized on 17 May 1925, by Pope Pius XI, only 28 years after her death. Thérèse of Lisieux is the patron saint of people with AIDS, aviators, florists, illness(es) and missions. She is also considered by Catholics to be the patron saint of Russia. In 1927, Pope Pius XI named Thérèse a patroness of the missions. By the Apostolic Letter Divini Amoris Scientia (The Science of Divine Love) of 19 October 1997, Pope John Paul II declared her one of the Doctors of the Universal Church, one of only three women so named, the others being Teresa of Ávila (Saint Teresa of Jesus) and Catherine of Siena.

== Church History ==
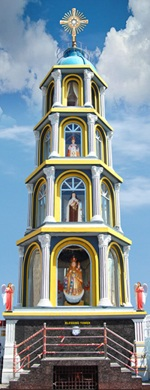
Blessing Tower

In 1967 the people of Madumanagar, built a Church in the name of St. Teresa of Child Jesus. On those days that church was under Our Lady of Lourdes' Shrine Parish, Perambur. St. Theresa Church was bifurcated from Our Lady of Lourdes' Shrine, Perambur and established as independent Parish with 400 families in 1994. It was entrusted to Salesian priest Basil SDB. Fr. Basil (1994–2003) bought an 8 ground land in Sembiam to build a new church with more facilities. The church was built and consecrated by Archbishop Aruldos James, After nine years, the Church was handed over to Archdiocese of Madras-Mylapore. Fr. Inigo (2003–2010) was the first diocesan priest appointed for this parish. Our Lady's Grotto and parish house was constructed and completed in 2003 by him. In 2006, he began the devotion of Infant Jesus, for giving homage to the statue brought from Prague. In 2008, Fr. Inigo built Blessing Tower at the entrance of this church. In 2011, Fr.K.T.Matthew (2010–2011) furnished a guest house for priests. Fr.Stephen (2011–2013) made the interior architectural works in the church. Fr. Joseph Albert (2015-) is the present Parish Priest.

== Important Events ==
First day of the Month: The day devoted to St. Theresa is celebrated at evening with Rosary, Novena Prayer and Mass.

Thursdays: The day devoted to Infant Jesus is celebrated at evening with Rosary, Mass and oil pouring ritual.

First Fridays: Celebrated at evening for the devotion to Sacred Heart of Jesus with Rosary, Mass and Eucharistic Adoration.

First Saturdays: Celebrated at evening for the devotion to Mother Mary with Rosary and Mass.

24th of the Month: Celebrated at evening for the devotion to Our Lady Help of Christians with Rosary and Mass.

Church Festival: St.Theresa's feast is celebrated on 1st Sunday of October with great devotion. Before that Novena Prayers and Mass celebrated at evening for nine days start from flag hoisting.

== Gallery of the Church ==
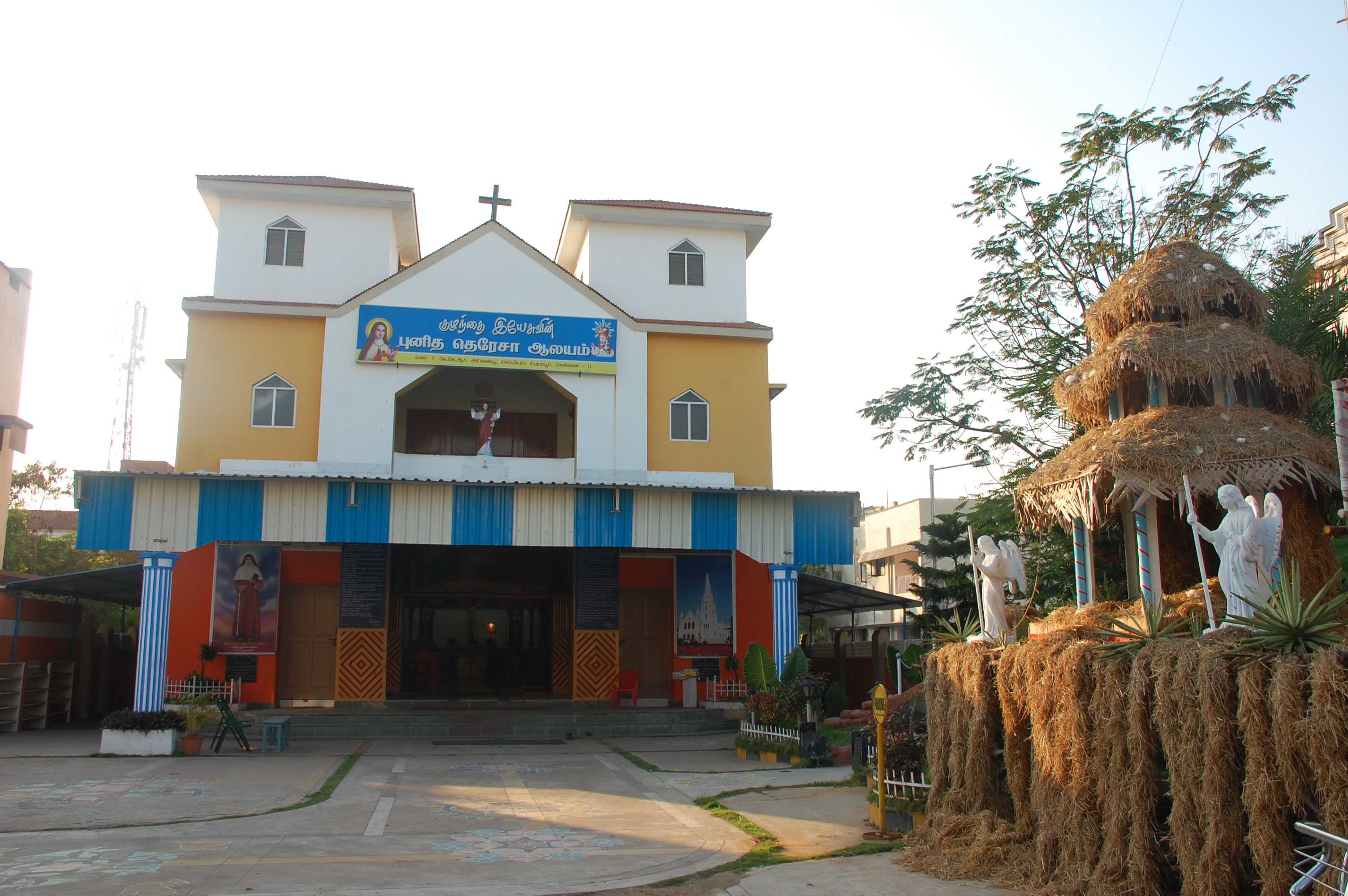
St. Theresa Church's View during Christmas 2008

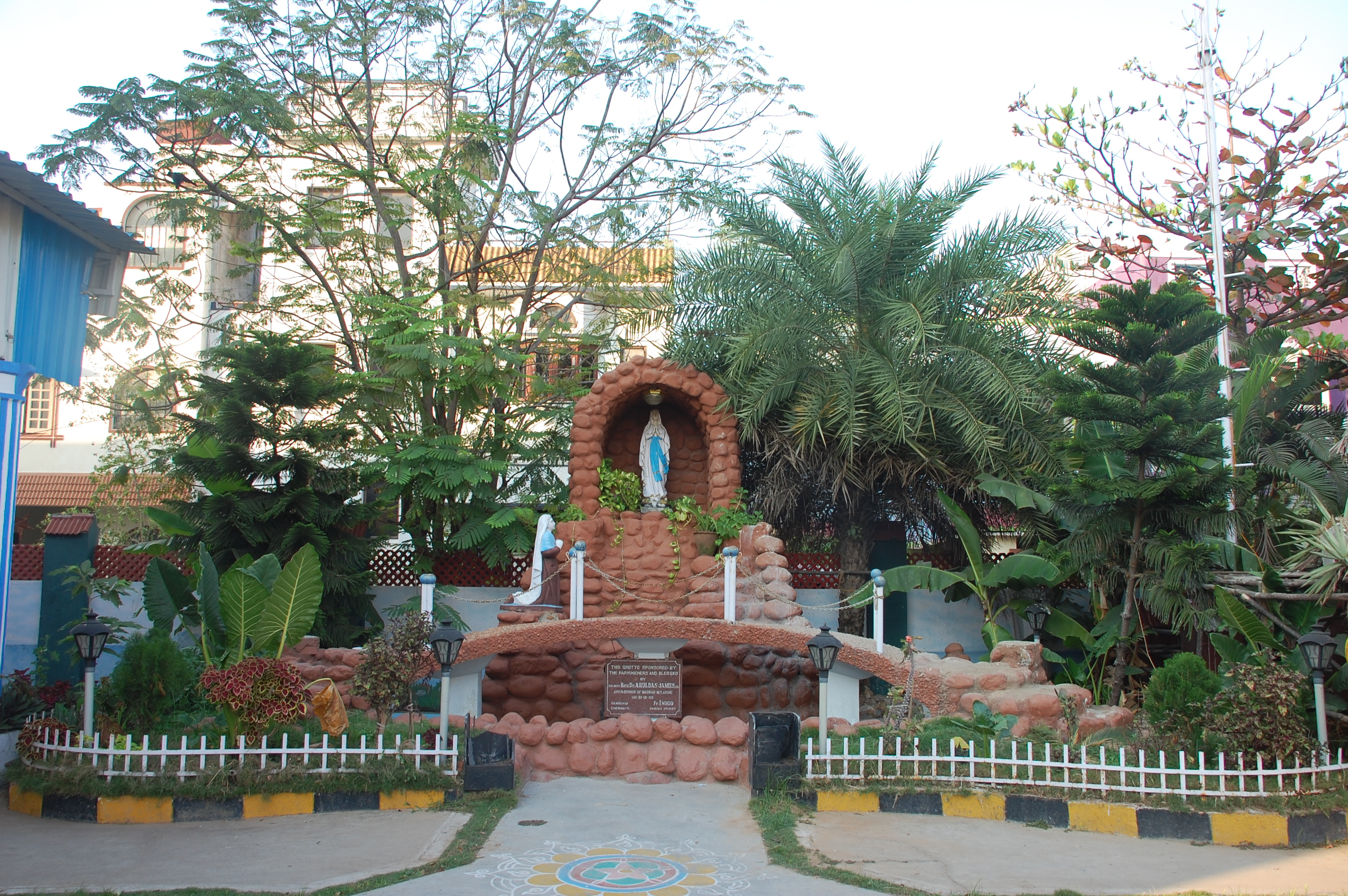
Grotto of Our Lady at St. Theresa Church

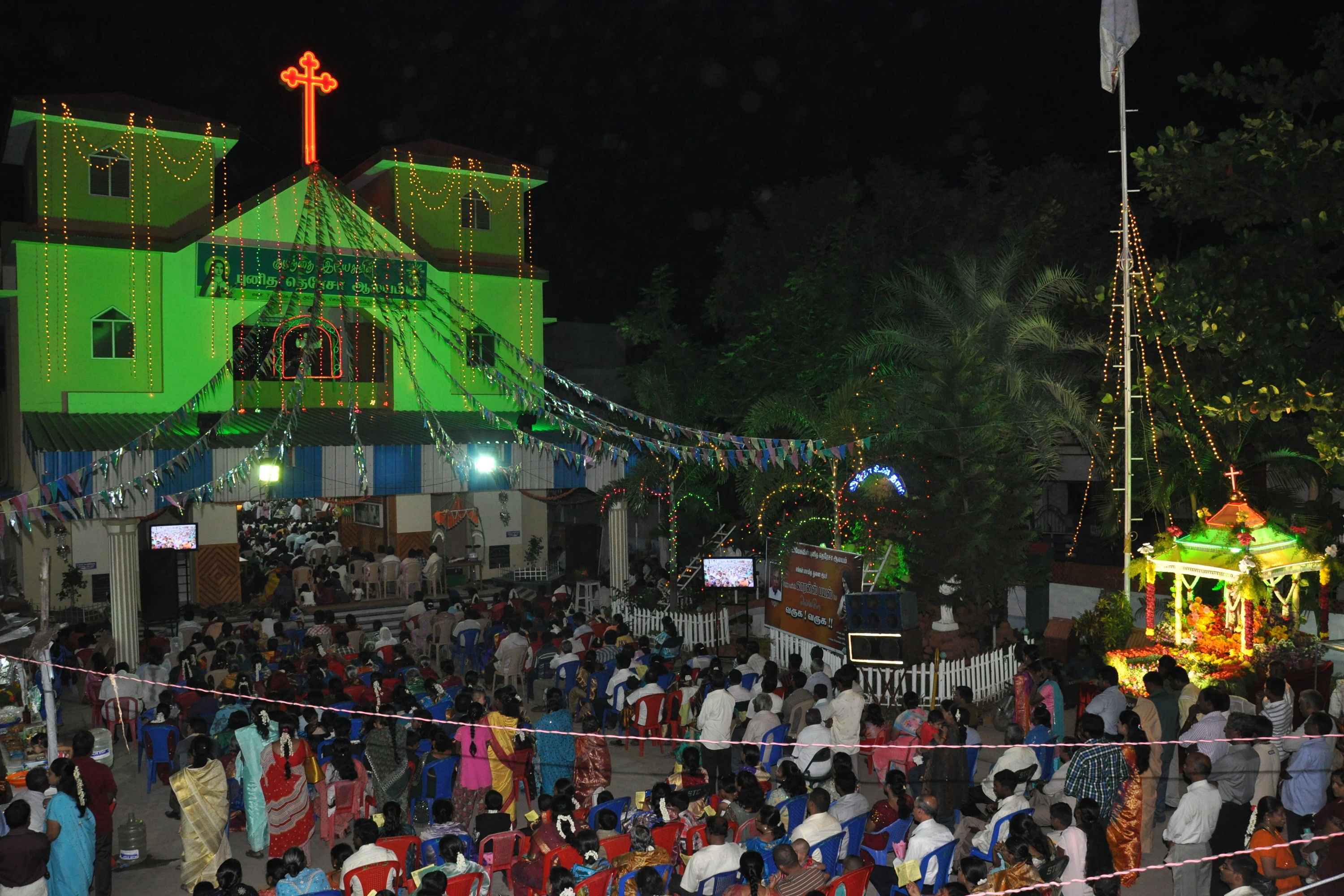
St. Theresa Church at Feast October 1, 2011
