= Vellayambalam =

Road interchange in Kerala, India

Vellayambalam is a prominent junction in the city of Thiruvananthapuram in the state of Kerala, India. It is situated on the Rajapatha (Royal Path) that stretches from Kowdiar to East Fort. This junction connects the arterial roads connecting Kowdiar, Sasthamangalam, East Fort, Thycaud and Thampanoor. A statue of Ayyankali is situated in the centre of the roundabout which serves as a memorial to the freedom fighter.

== History and origin of name ==
The road leading from Kowdiar Square to the Fine Arts college via Vellayambalam junction, Museum and Rama Rao Lamp was constructed during the early 1930s and "Charalkonna" (Copper Pod tree) brought from Sri Lanka was planted as avenue trees. Before the widening, Vellayambalam junction was a tiny place, where four narrow roads met. A Wayside Inn (Vazhiambalam) of the revenue department occupied the south east corner of that junction at the foot of the diamond hill. As the Maharajah often passed through that junction, the inn was kept clean and whitewashed. Because of that white wayside inn (Vella Vazhi Ambalam ) that junction came to be known as 'Vellayambalam' (shortened form of Vella Vazhi Ambalam) and in due course the locality around was also named Vellayambalam.

== Description ==
Vellayambalam hosts buildings of a number of governmental and other institutions ranging from KELTRON, Kerala's Electronic hub, Latin Arch Bishop's House, St. Theresa of Lisieux church, Police Headquarters, Trivandrum Planning Board, KFC-Kerala Financial Corporation, KPCC centre, Kerala Water Authority, Ambedkar Hostel for boys, Air India's District Office and the Institute of Engineers Hall. KELTRON constitutes the major portion of the place with its development center, internet cafe, CUSAT educational programs. A major number of travel agencies operate in and around this area. The office of Centre for Development of Advanced Computing (CDAC) is also situated here.

Raj Bhavan, the official residence of the Governor of Kerala, is situated here and forms a major landmark. Vellayambalam Palace today houses one of the electronic companies named Keltron. The place stands in its full beauty during Onam. Yakshi Amma Althara Temple forms an important temple in Vellayambalam. The temple is constructed around a huge Banyan tree. Rajapatha starts from Kowdiar and goes through Vellayambalam, the buildings here are beautifully illuminated with colorful lights in the eve of Onam. Trivandrum International Airport is about 12 km and the Thiruvananthapuram Central Railway Station is 5 km away from Vellayambalam.

== Entertainment ==
Vellayambalam is adjacent to the neighborhood of Kowdiar where the royal palace of Travancore King Sree Chithira Thirunal Balarama Varma is located. Partly due to this proximity, Vellayambalam has great recreational spots. Kanakakkunnu Palace located in Vellayambalam is often described the resting place of the king. Suryakanthi is a fair ground within the Kanakkunnu palace grounds where a number of Kerala's cultural festivals are hosted. Kanakakkunnu is the main attraction on the eve of Onam as the venue of the official Onam celebrations hosted by the state government. It starts with an elephant procession at the entrance of Kannakakkunnu. A wide range of exhibition of various sporty rides and various cultural programs are hosted within the palace compound.

Manaveeyam Veedhi which hosts numerous cultural events including art exhibitions and street plays is located in Vellayambalam. Vellayambalam has a swimming pool and a stadium in which many sports are played. The Trivandrum Club, also known as Subramanium club, is one of the oldest and most elegant clubs in Trivandrum. Towards Sasthamangalam road, there is a Spencer's outlet, a few restaurants, and a variety of grocery shops.
