= Acosta =

Acosta is a Spanish and Portuguese surname. Originally, it was used to refer to a person who lived by the seashore or was from the mountains (encostas). It comes from the Portuguese da Costa (cognate of English "coast", literally translates as "of the coast"), which in Spanish became de Acosta; the exact Spanish counterpart of da Costa is "de la Costa". Notable people with the surname include:

- Adolovni Acosta (1946–2024), Filipino classical pianist
- Agustín Acosta (baseball), Cuban baseball player
- Alberto Acosta (born 1966), Argentine footballer
- Alexander Acosta (born 1969), American attorney and United States Secretary of Labor 2017–2019
- Alda Ribiero Acosta (contemporary), American terrorist in Uruguay
- Allan Acosta, American engineer
- Ariel Acosta-Rubio, Venezuelan entrepreneur co-founder of Churromania
- Armando Acosta (contemporary), doom metal drummer, former member of the band Saint Vitus
- Avie Acosta (born 1996/1997), American fashion model
- Bertrand Blanchard Acosta (1895–1954), American aviator who flew in the Spanish Civil War
- Beto Acosta (born 1977), Uruguayan footballer
- Carlos Acosta (born 1973), Cuban ballet dancer
- Cecilio Acosta (1818–1881), Venezuelan writer
- Clodomira Acosta (1936–1958), Cuban revolutionary
- Cristóbal Acosta (1515–1580), Portuguese physician and natural historian
- Ed Acosta (born 1944), Panamanian Major League Baseball pitcher
- Eliades Acosta (born 1959), Cuban politician
- Iván Acosta (born 1964), Nicaraguan politician
- Gael Acosta (born 1992), Mexican footballer
- Jim Acosta (born 1971), CNN senior White House correspondent
- Joaquín Acosta (1800–1852), Colombian explorer and author
- Joe Acosta (1950–2020), Puerto Rican salsa piano player
- José de Acosta (1540–1600), Spanish Jesuit missionary and historian to Latin America
- José Eusebio Acosta, Venezuelan militar
- José Julián Acosta (1825–1891), Puerto Rican journalist and abolitionist
- Josephine Acosta Pasricha (1945–2020), Filipino Indologist and translator
- Juan F. Acosta (1890–1968), Puerto Rican composer and music teacher
- Julio Acosta García (1872–1954), President of Costa Rica 1920–1924
- Lautaro Acosta (born 1988), Argentine footballer
- Leopoldo Acosta (born 1962), Ecuadorian track and field athlete
- Luciano Acosta (born 1994), Argentine footballer
- Felipe Acosta Carlez (1951-1989), Venezuelan militar
- Luis Acosta Carlez (born 1957), Venezuelan militar
- Mae Acosta, Filipino singer and SexBomb Girls member.
- Mathieu d'Acosta (born in 1589), translator & explorer, first recorded black person in Canada
- Manuel Gregorio Acosta (1921–1989), Mexican-American painter
- Manuel da Costa (1541–1604), Portuguese Jesuit priest, teacher, and missionary
- Manny Acosta (born 1981) Panamian baseball player
- Maria Teresa Acosta, Venezuelan actress
- Marta Acosta, American fiction writer
- Martha Acosta (contemporary), Peruvian politician and congresswoman
- Maximo Acosta (born 2002), Venezuelan baseball player
- Mercedes de Acosta (1893–1968), Spanish-American poet, playwright, and designer
- Miguel Acosta, Venezuelan boxer
- Nelson Acosta (1944–), Uruguayan football player and coach
- Óscar Acosta (1933–2014), Honduran writer, critic, politician and diplomat
- Oscar Zeta Acosta (1935–1974), American attorney, author, politician, and activist
- Pablo Acosta Ortiz, Venezuelan physician
- Pablo Acosta Villarreal, Mexican drug lord
- Pedro Acosta (born 1959), Venezuelan football (soccer) defender
- Pedro Acosta (born 2004), Spanish motorcycle racer
- Persida Acosta, Filipino attorney
- Raúl Acosta (born 1962), Colombian road cyclist
- Rodolfo Acosta (1920–1974), Mexican character actor
- Santiago Acosta (born 1979), Argentine flyweight boxer
- Santos Acosta (1828–1901), President of Colombia 1867–1868
- Socorro Acosta (1934–2024), Filipino politician
- St. Elmo W. Acosta (1900s), American politician from Jacksonville, Florida
- Teolindo Acosta (1937–2004), Venezuelan professional baseball player
- Teresa Acosta (1777–1851), Spanish bank founder
- Tomás Diez Acosta (1946–2023), Cuban revolutionary, teacher, and author
- Uriel da Costa (1585–1640), Portuguese philosopher and skeptic

== Other ==
- Acosta (crater), lunar crater named after Cristóbal Acosta
- Acosta Bridge, bridge in Jacksonville, Florida named after St. Elmo W. Acosta
- Acosta (canton)
- Acosta (plant), taxonomic synonym for the genus Centaurea
