= Teresa =

- Pronunciation: /təˈriːzə, -sə/
- Gender: Female

Origin
- Origin: Uncertain (presumably Greek)
- Region of origin: Iberia

Other names
- Alternative spelling: Theresa, Terisa, Thereza, Teréz, Terézia, Tereza, Theresia
- Nicknames: Terri, Terry, Tracy, Tessa, Tess, Resa
- Related names: Teresinha

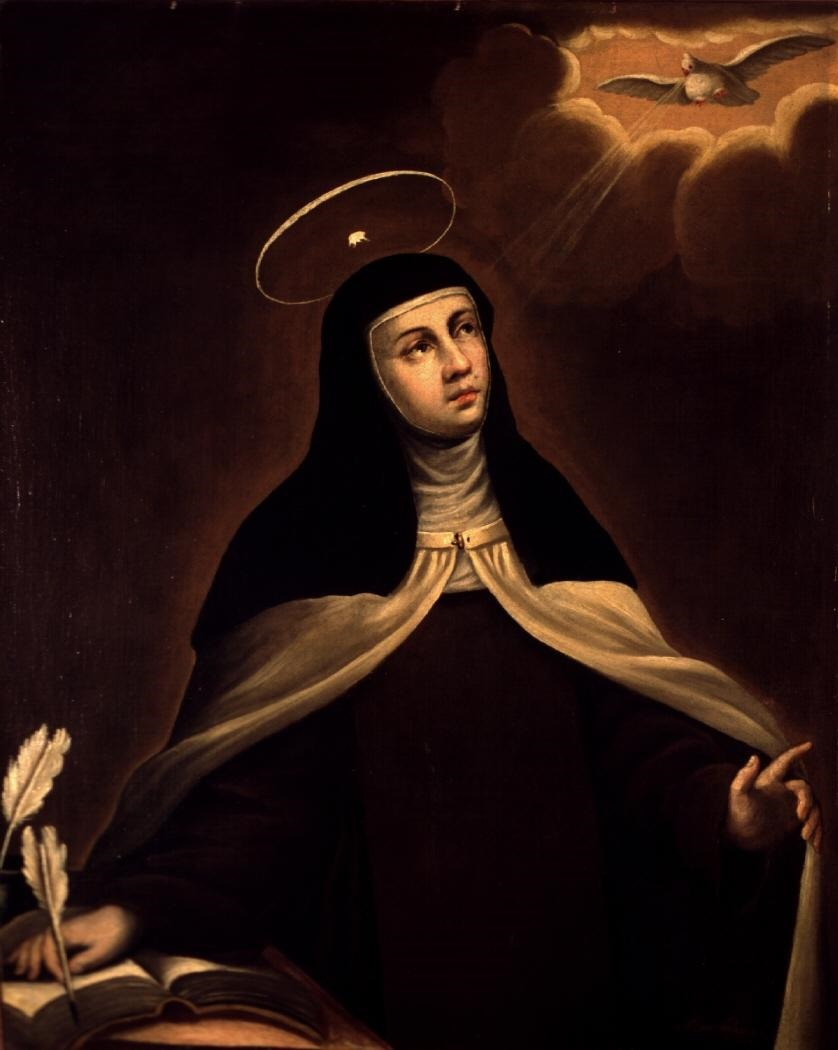
Saint Teresa of Jesus (1515–1582).

Teresa (also Theresa, Therese; French: Thérèse) is a feminine given name.

It originates in the Iberian Peninsula in late antiquity. It is first recorded in the form Therasia, the name of Therasia of Nola, an aristocrat of the 4th century. Its popularity outside of Iberia increased because of Saint Teresa of Ávila, and more recently Thérèse of Lisieux and Mother Teresa.

In the United States it was ranked as the 852nd most popular name for girls born in 2008, down from 226th in 1992 (it ranked 65th in 1950, and 102nd in 1900). Spelled "Teresa," it was the 580th most popular name for girls born in 2008, down from 206th in 1992 (it ranked 81st in 1950, and 220th in 1900).

== People ==
=== Aristocracy ===
- Teresa of Portugal (disambiguation)
  - Theresa, Countess of Portugal (1080–1130), mother of Afonso Henriques, the first King of Portugal
  - Theresa of Portugal, Countess of Flanders (1157–1218), daughter of Afonso Henriques and wife of Philip, Count of Flanders
  - Theresa of Portugal, Queen of León (1181–1250), daughter of Sancho I of Portugal and wife of Alfonso IX of León
  - Infanta Maria Teresa of Braganza (1793–1874), firstborn child of John VI of Portugal
- Theresa Kunegunda Sobieska (1676–1730), Electress consort of Bavaria, wife of Maximilian II Emanuel
- Teresa Lubomirska, Polish noble lady
- Teresa of the Two Sicilies, Empress-consort of Brazil
- Teresa, Contessa Guiccioli (1800–1873), the married lover of Lord Byron in Ravenna

=== Arts ===
- Teresa Berganza (1933–2022), Spanish opera singer
- Teresa Brewer (1931–2007), American pop and jazz singer
- Teresa Cameselle (born 1968), Spanish writer of romantic novels and historical narratives
- Teresa Carpenter (born 1948), Pulitzer Prize-winning American author
- Teresa Carpio (born 1956), Cantopop singer and actress
- Teresa Carreño (1853–1917), Venezuelan musician
- Teresa Cheung Siu-wai (born 1963), Canadian actress and producer
- Teresa Cheung Tak-lan (born 1959), Hong Kong singer
- Teresa Cheung (socialite) (born 1963), Hong Kong socialite and actress
- Theresa Chromati, American painter
- Teresa De Sio (born 1952), Italian folk singer-songwriter
- Teresa Edgerton, American author of fantasy novels and short stories
- Theresa Fu (born 1984), Hong Kong singer and actress
- Teresa Gallagher, British actress
- Therese Grankvist (born 1977), Swedish singer
- Teresa Graves (1948–2002), American actress and singer
- Teresa Ha (1937–2019), former Chinese television and film actress
- Theresa Harris (1906–1985), American actress, dancer and singer
- Theresa Ikoko, British playwright
- Tereza Kesovija (born 1938), ex Yugoslav and Croatian singer
- Theresa Lee (born 1970), Hong Kong-born Canadian actress
- Teresa Mak (born 1975), Hong Kong actress
- Teresa Medeiros (born 1962), American romance novelist
- Teresa Mo (born 1960), Hong Kong actress
- Teresa Nielsen Hayden (born 1956), American writer and teacher
- Teresa Palmer (born 1986), Australian actress
- Teresa Parente, American actress
- Theresa Randle (born 1964), American actress
- Teresa Reichlen, American ballet dancer
- Theresa Russell (born 1957), American actress
- Theresa Saldana (1954–2016), American actress
- Teresa Salgueiro (born 1967), Portuguese singer
- Theresa Sareo, American singer-songwriter
- Theresa Sokyrka (born 1981), Canadian singer-songwriter
- Teresa Stratas (born 1938), Canadian soprano
- Teresa Teng (1953–1995), Taiwanese queen of pop
- Teresa Vila (1931–2009), Uruguayan visual artist
- Teresa Villaverde (born 1966), Portuguese film director
- Lady Teresa Waugh (born 1940), British novelist and translator
- Teresa Wright (1918–2005), Academy Award-winning American actress
- Teresa Żarnowerówna (1897–1949), Polish avant-garde artist

=== Politics ===
- Theresa Ahearn (1951–2000), Irish Member of Parliament
- Theresa Berg Andersen (born 1979), Danish politician
- Teresa Aquino-Oreta (1944–2020), Filipino politician
- Teresa Bellanova (born 1958), Italian Minister of Agriculture
- Teresa Cheng (politician) (born 1958), Hong Kong Justice Minister
- Teresa Chipia, Angolan politician
- Teresa Heinz (born 1938), former widow of U.S. Senator H. John Heinz III; wife of Senator John Kerry
- Teresa Isaac, American politician, former mayor of Lexington, Kentucky
- Teresa Kok (born 1964), Malaysian Member of Parliament
- Theresa May (born 1956), former Prime Minister of the United Kingdom and Leader of the Conservative Party; UK Member of Parliament
- Teresa Mosqueda (born 1980), American politician
- Teresa Pearce (born 1955), former UK Member of Parliament
- Teresa Reyes Sahagún (born 1963), Mexican politician
- Teresa Ribera (born 1969), Spanish jurist, university professor and politician
- Teresa Riera (born 1950), Spanish politician
- Teresa Rodríguez (born 1981), Spanish politician
- Theresa Stroffolino (died 1976), American politician
- Teresa Tomlinson (born 1965), American politician
- Theresa Villiers (born 1968), UK Member of Parliament
- Teresa Wat (born 1949), Canadian member of the Legislative Assembly of British Columbia
- Theresa Wood, American politician in Vermont

=== Religion ===
- List of saints named Teresa
- Teresa Chikaba, Ghanaian princess declared Venerable by the Catholic Church
- Teresa Demjanovich, American nun of the Sisters of Charity

=== Sports ===
- Teresa Abelleira (born 2000), Spanish footballer
- Tereza Brandtlová (born 1985), Czech Paralympic archer
- Teresa Ciepły (1937–2006), Polish sprinter
- Teresa Earnhardt (born 1958), widow of racing legend Dale Earnhardt
- Teresa Edwards (born 1964), American basketball player
- Tereza Gildainová (born 2008), Czech ice hockey player
- Tereza Kmochová (born 1990), Czech alpine skier
- Teresa Machado (1969–2020), Portuguese athlete
- Teresa Piccini, Mexican ten-pin bowler
- Tereza Pištěková (born 2005), Czech ice hockey player
- Tereza Plosová (born 2006), Czech ice hockey
- Teresa Rivera (born 1966), Mexican swimmer
- Teresa Rohmann (born 1987), German medley swimmer
- Teresa Ruiz (born 1974), American State Senator from New Jersey
- Theresa Schafzahl (born 2000), Austrian ice hockey player
- Teresa Vaill (born 1962), American racewalker
- Theresa Zabell (born 1965), Spanish sailor

=== Other ===
- Teresa Acosta (1777–1851), Spanish bank founder
- Teresa Adams (1869–1947), American civil rights activist and suffragist.
- Teresa Ciceri Castiglioni (1750–1821), Italian inventor, agronomist
- Teresa Cormack, murder victim from New Zealand
- Therese Crawford (died 1970), Australian murder victim
- Teresa "Terri" Cruz (1927–2017), American community organizer
- Teresa Abi-Nader Dahlberg (born 1961), academic administrator and engineering professor
- Teresa del Valle (1937–2025), Spanish anthropologist
- Teresa Grodzińska (1899–1920), Polish wartime nurse, the first woman in the Second Polish Republic to receive Poland's highest military decoration Virtuti Militari
- Teresa de Lauretis (1938–2026), Italian academic, feminist and author
- Theresa Lawson (1951–2014), Australian convicted of embezzlement
- Teresa Lewis, American convicted murderer
- Teresa Magbanua, Filipino schoolteacher and revolutionary
- Teresa Manera, Argentine paleontologist
- Teresa Merz (1879–1958), English social worker, philanthropist and magistrate
- Teresa Pellegrino (born 1975), Italian chemist, academic
- Theresa A. Powell (1952–2023), academic administrator
- Teresa Rodrigo (1956–2020), Spanish scientist
- Teresa Romero (born 1958), Mexican and American labor union leader
- Teresa Sampsonia, Persian noblewoman, diplomat, adventuress
- Teresa Sickles, wife of Daniel Edgar Sickles, who stood trial for killing her lover
- Teresa Meana Suárez (born 1952), Spanish feminist activist, teacher, and philologist
- Teresa Toda (born 1950), Basque journalist
- Teresa Webber, British palaeographer, medievalist, and academic

== Fictional characters ==
- Teresa Tracy Bond (née Di Vicenzo), Bond girl and wife of James Bond in the film On Her Majesty's Secret Service
- Teresa Bryant, on the British soap opera Coronation Street
- Theresa Burke, wife of main character Ethan Burke on the American TV series Wayward Pines
- Teresa Cammeniti, on the Australian soap opera Neighbours
- Theresa Rourke Cassidy, alter-ego of the Marvel Comics heroine Siryn
- Teresa Chávez, protagonist and villain from the TV series Teresa
- Theresa "Tess" Durbeyfield, title character of Thomas Hardy's novel Tess of the d'Urbervilles
- Theresa Fowler, from the animated TV series Randy Cunningham: 9th Grade Ninja
- Theresa “Terry” Gionoffrio, in Rosemary's baby
- Theresa "Tessa" Gray, protagonist and main character of The Infernal Devices novel series by Cassandra Clare
- Tessie (Teresa) Hutchinson, the only character to protest the village tradition of stoning in Shirley Jackson's The Lottery
- Teresa Lisbon, one of the main characters in the drama The Mentalist
- Theresa Lopez-Fitzgerald, a main character in the soap opera Passions
- Theresa Terri McGreggor, in Degrassi: The Next Generation
- Theresa McQueen, from the British soap opera Hollyoaks
- Teresa Moreno, wife of Richard Sharpe in Bernard Cornwell's Sharpe series of historical fiction
- Teresa Parker, long lost younger sister of Peter Parker / Spider-Man from Marvel Comics.
- Theresa Rourke, also known as Siryn, is Banshee's daughter in Marvel Comics
- Theresa Russo, from Wizards of Waverly Place
- Theresa Spencer, girlfriend and research partner of the character Daniel Faraday from the TV series Lost
- Mary Therese Tribbiani, Joey Tribbiani's sister in NBC sitcom Friends
- Teresa Wisemail, from the PlayStation role-playing game Suikoden II
- Theresa, an immortal seeress, one of the main characters in the Fable video game series
- Teresa (Barbie), a fashion doll and Barbie's best friend
- Teresa Agnes, from James Dashner's book series The Maze Runner
- Tereza, from Milan Kundera's novel The Unbearable Lightness of Being
- Theresa (a.k.a. The Fighter), one of the main characters from the Canadian animated series Class of the Titans
- Teresa of Telezart, important character from the second series of the long-running space opera franchise Space Battleship Yamato
- Teresa of the Faint Smile, in Claymore
- Boos, known in Japan as Teresa, are ghosts from the Mario and Yoshi series of video games.
- Teresa Mendoza, protagonist and drug cartel leader from Queen of the South
- Theresa Keller, a new girl from the children's program Heidi (2015 TV series)
- Theresa Servopoulos, from The Last of Us
- Theresa Apocalypse, from Honkai Impact 3rd
- Teresa "Tere" Ramirez, on the Disney show Primos
- Theresa, the prominent figure also acting mother of main character Amiya from Arknights

== See also ==
- Maria Theresa (disambiguation)
- Marie Thérèse (disambiguation)
- Therese (disambiguation)
- Theresia
- Terisa
- Tirzah (disambiguation)
