= Teresia =

Teresia is a feminine given name, a variant of Teresa and may refer to:

- Princess Therese of Saxe-Altenburg (1836-1914), also known as Teresia, Swedish and Norwegian princess in 1864
- Teresia Muthoni Gateri (born 2002), a Kenyan long-distance runner
- Teresia Mbaika Malokwe (born 1986), a Kenyan environmentalist
- Teresia Constantia Phillips (1700/1703–1765), British courtesan
- Teresia Teaiwa (1968-2017), an I-Kiribati and African-American scholar, poet, activist and mentor
- Teresa Sampsonia (1589-1668), also known as Teresia Sampsonia, an Iranian-English noblewoman of the Safavid Empire of Iran

== Fictional characters ==
- Teresia Karisik (Sage), a Marvel Comics character

== See also ==
- Teresa
- Theresia
- Teresian
