= Thereza =

Thereza is an alternative spelling for the feminine given name Teresa and may refer to:

== People named Thereza ==
=== Given name ===
- Thereza Bazar (born 1955) British-Canadian singer
- Thereza Imanishi-Kari (born 1943) American academic and professor of pathology
- Thereza Dillwyn Llewelyn (1834–1926) British photographer
- Thereza Rucker (1863–1941), born as Thereza Charlotte Story-Maskelyne, British promoter of household science education
- Thereza Santos (1930–2012), Brazilian writer

=== Middle name ===
- Maria Thereza Alves (born 1961) Brazilian-born artist and activist
- Maria Thereza Goulart (born 1936) widow of the 24th president of Brazil

=== Surname ===
- Sylvia Thereza, Brazilian classical pianist

== Other ==
- Thereza (genus), a harvestman genus in the sub-family Caelopyginae

== See also ==
- Theresa
