= Tales Machado =

Brazilian pianist

Tales Machado de Souza (born 2006 in São Paulo) is a Brazilian pianist. He is recognized as one of the leading names of the new generation of pianists in the country. His talent has been acknowledged by pianists such as Miguel Proença, Janusz Olejniczak, and Sylvia Thereza.

== Career ==
=== Early training ===
Machado was born into a family connected to the arts. His first contact with the piano was at the age of six, during a visit to his aunt, a pianist, a moment that sparked his passion for the instrument. At seven, he began studying music as an autodidact; at eight, he gave his first concert in his hometown, São Paulo.

=== Formal education ===
He studied piano at the Fundação das Artes de São Caetano do Sul, under the guidance of professor Cláudia Siste. In 2024, at age 18, he enrolled in the Music program at the University of São Paulo. He is currently a student in the class of professor Eduardo Monteiro. He also participates in the institution's Piano Laboratory (LaP).

=== Recognition ===
In 2021, at age 15, he won first place in the IV Round of the XXX Souza Lima Piano Competition, considered one of the most important piano contests in Brazil. In 2024, at age 17, he was invited by pianist Miguel Proença, former president of Fundação Nacional de Artes and former director of Sala Cecília Meireles, to become his musical partner. In 2025, he performed internationally at the Pianíssimo Festival in Moscow, Saint Petersburg (at the Winter Palace of the Hermitage Museum), and Nizhny Novgorod, where he was described by the local press as "a master of expression from Brazil". He also performed in São Paulo, at the Teatro B32.

=== Collaborations ===
He is a partner of Uaná – Association pour les Arts, an organization that promotes concerts and cultural initiatives worldwide.
