= Sueli Carneiro =

Brazilian philosopher and activist

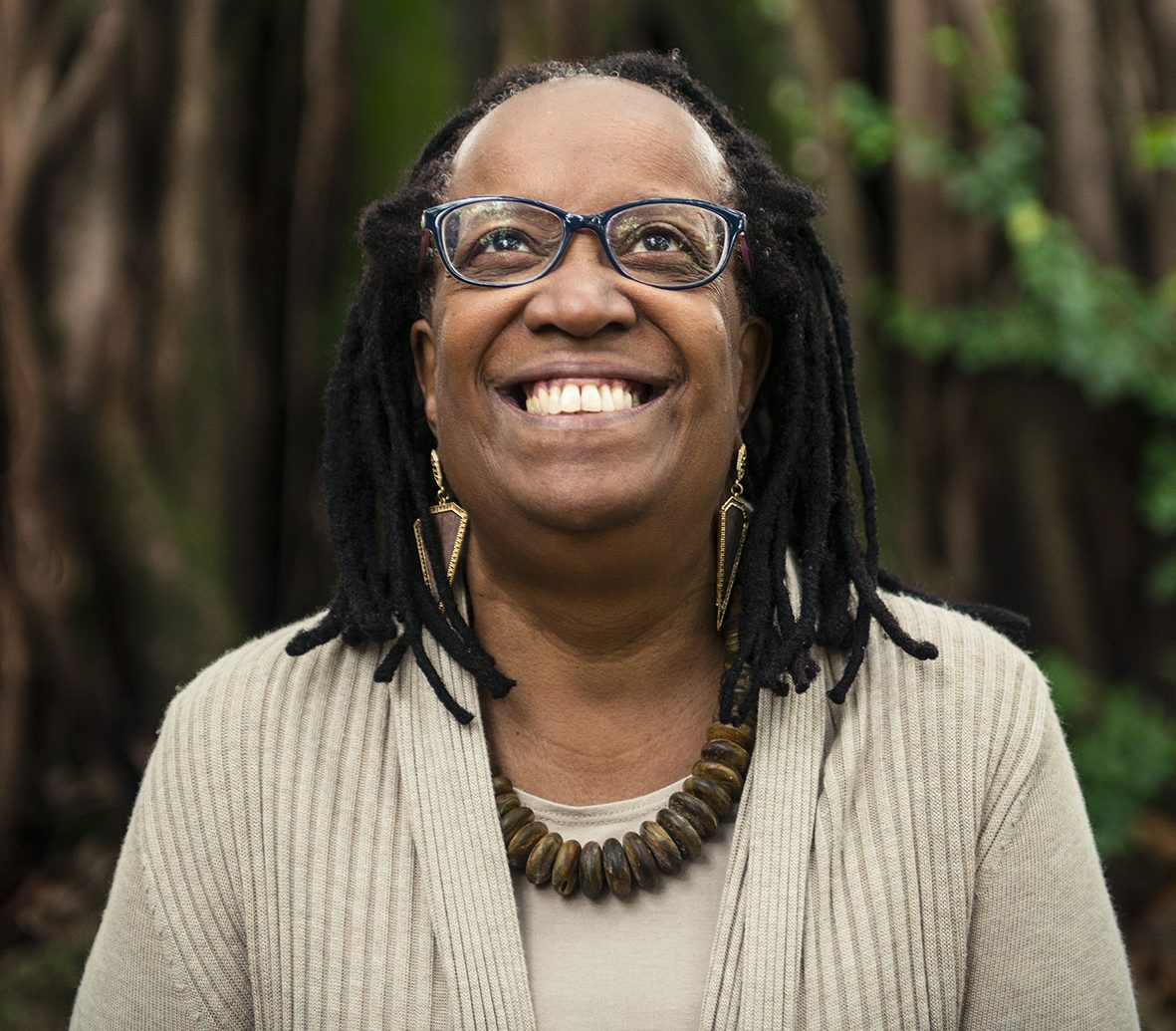
- Born: Aparecida Sueli Carneiro Jacoel; June 24, 1950 (age 76); São Paulo, São Paulo, Brazil
- Education: University of São Paulo
- Occupations: philosopher, writer, activist
- Known for: antiracism, black feminist activism

Aparecida Sueli Carneiro Jacoel, best known as Sueli Carneiro (born 24 June 1950 in São Paulo) is a Brazilian philosopher, writer and anti-racism activist. Carneiro is the founder and current director of Geledés — Instituto da Mulher Negra (Geledés — Black Women's Institute) and a leading author on black feminism in Brazil.

== Life and work ==
Carneiro was born in 1950, in the São Paulo neighborhood of Lapa, the eldest of seven children of José Horácio Carneiro, a railroad worker, and Eva Alves Carneiro, a seamstress. Carneiro became active in the black feminist movement in Brazil from the late 1970s. In 1983, when the São Paulo state government created the Conselho Estadual da Condição Feminina (State Council for the Feminine Condition), Carneiro got involved in a successful campaign for a black woman, the radio broadcaster Marta Arruda, to join the council; there were no black woman among the thirty-two council members.

== Family ==
As a young woman, Sueli Carneiro met and married a Caucasian Jewish man, Maurice Jacoel in 1972, a time in which Jacoel was preparing for university. Though Carneiro had been working in the civil service field at the time, Jacoel convinced her to attend the University of São Paulo with him where they both completed a degree in Psychology. Later, Caneiro went on to earn her doctorate degree in education from the same institution. Before their eventual divorce, Jacoel and Carneiro gave birth to a daughter named Luanda Carneiro Jarcoel. A grown woman herself, Luanda has received a variety of degrees including an undergraduate degree in Communication of Performing Arts from PUC in São Paulo, a certification from the Somatic Movement Institute in the Netherlands, and is currently finishing up a Master in Performance at the Norwegian Theater Academy. Co-founder of ACTS, a laboratory for practicing performances and fostering connections with other artists from around the world, Luanda continues the creative legacy of her mother Carneiro. Her father Maurice Jacoel currently works as an astrologist, professor, and therapist.

== Early career and education ==
Sueli Carneiro attended the Universidade de São Paulo (University of São Paulo/USP) in the early 1970s, and found herself one of the few black students on campus in the middle of the Brazilian military dictatorship. The military dictatorship in Brazil lasted from 1964-1985, and like many other university students at the time, Carneiro was subject to the harsh censorship and suppressed human rights in that era.

Although born to parents who were devote Catholics, while as an undergraduate in philosophy Carneiro became curious about the religion Candomble. Feeling stifled and trapped by Western tradition ideals, Caneiro sought for new perspectives and original thinking that allowed her to see the world in a new light. Though the relationship with Candomble began simply research-driven, Carneiro soon found a love for the religion and would go on to write several articles about black feminism. What began as just a research project, "O poder feminino no culto aos orixas", soon sparked Carneiro's passion for protecting African cultural heritage from the attacks of demoralizing colonization. This research would lead Carneiro to found several black feminist organizations, including Geledes Instituto da Mulher Negra, which helped lay the foundation for contemporary movements in behalf of rights for black women. Carneiro would go on to publish much of her own work, including more than 150 articles for magazines and newspapers, in addition to 17 books.

Carneiro is a stanch advocate for black feminism, and attributes the fuel behind this fire to domestic violence that she experienced when she was a young girl. She fights against the patriarchy that "makes it possible for men to oppress or harm women". In addition, one important element of her political agenda for black women has been the fight for recognition for the "symbolic violence and oppression that whiteness, as a privileged and hegemonic aesthetic standard, causes on non-white women".

== Activism ==
Sueli Carneiro was an activist her whole life. Her life in activism was fueled by her admiration of Malcolm X and Nelson Mandela. She believed that to change the stereotypes and oppression that women experienced, there needs to be a discussion around the traditional roles of women and learn that those roles can be changed and are not set in stone. She also fought for young kids of color to be educated and keep education at the forefront of their minds.

In 1988, she founded Geledés — Instituto da Mulher Negra, first independent black feminist organization in São Paulo. They educate women on bodily autonomy and push for more female representation in the workplace. The Institute also provides physical and mental health to black women. Months after founding Geledés, Carneiro was invited to join the Conselho Nacional da Condição Feminina (National Council for the Feminine Condition), in Brasília.

In 1992, a group of rappers in São Paulo approached Geledés, being victims of police violence, they wanted to change that discourse. Thus was created the Project Rappers. The kids that were part of this project were taught to use their music to denounce racism, sexism, and other forms of discrimination. Their mission was "bringing the originality of articulating cultural activity with political action using musical language as an instrument of awareness and appreciation of black youth".

Carneiro created the only health program specific for Afro-Brazilian women. Weekly, more than thirty women are attended by psychologists and social workers, participating in lectures on sexuality, contraception, physical and mental health at Geledés headquarters. She also created SOS Racismo, a program offering free legal assistance for victims of racial discrimination in São Paulo.

Aside from activism, Sueli Carneiro writes about feminism and racism. She wrote an essay on black women have to adapt to fit into the national feminist movement. She believes the feminist movement was created for and mainly benefits white women. She coined the phrase "Enegrecendo o feminimso", meaning "to turn feminism black". Carneiro uses this phrase to argue that black women have to break down various stereotypes and create their own definition of feminism to fit their circumstances, fighting harder to create a role for themselves within society. One famous quote of hers reads: "Us, black women, are the forefront of the feminist movement in our country".

Her dedicated life to activism got her an honorary doctorate degree from Universidade de Brasilia. She is the first black woman to receive such a title recognition from UnB. In her introduction at the ceremony, there was a special focus put on her African candobmlé heritage and how the guidance of the orixás has helped her influence many generations.

A biography has been written about her by Bianca Santana.

== Casa Sueli Carneiro ==
Currently there exists a project called Casa Sueli Carneiro which is a memorialization of the house in which she lived. This house holds many memories of Sueli Carneiro and the many conversations that happened in her home with other activists. It is meant to serve as an example of racial activism and support others involved in the fight against racism in Brazil. Today that same house can be reserved and used for cultural and educational activities. Online, you can enlist in courses that teach things such as African History, Afro-Brazilian leaders, and Brazilian History.

== Awards ==
- Prêmio Juca Pato - Intelectual do Ano (2025).
- Prêmio Benedito Galvão (2014).
- French Republic Human Rights Award .
- Prêmio Bertha Lutz (2003)
- Prémio de direitos humanos Franz de Castro Holzwarth (Honorable mention)

== Works ==
- Mulher negra: Política governamental e a mulher (1985) with Thereza Santos and Albertina de Oliveira Costa
- A construção do outro como não-ser como fundamento do ser (2005)
- Enegrecer o Feminismo ("Blackening Feminism") (2003)
  - Carneiro's most cited writing. This book helps the reader better understand the stark difference between the life of black Brazilian women and those Brazilian women that are white. She advocates for the inclusion of black female voices in the fight of feminism, predicting the eventual moment when black women would begin to speak up and join the feminist movements in Brazil .
- Racismo, sexismo e desigualdade no Brasil ("Racism, Sexism, and Inequality in Brazil") (2011)
  - This book is a compilation of Carneiro's major publications between the years of 2001 and 2010. These writings invite the reader to reflect on the racism and sexism which have been structurally established in Brazilian society, especially in relation to social and political matters.
- Escritos de uma obra
  - Similar to Racismo, sexismo e desigualdade no Brasil, this book compiles various texts from Carneiro. Unique to this book is a preface written by another popular and well-known author, Conceição Evaristo.
