= Infanta Teresa =

Infanta Teresa may refer to:

- Teresa Ramírez, daughter of King Ramiro II of León and wife of King García Sánchez I of Pamplona
- Theresa of Portugal, Countess of Flanders (1157–1218), daughter of King Afonso I of Portugal and wife of Count Philip of Flanders
- Theresa of Portugal, Queen of León (1181–1250), daughter of King Sancho I of Portugal and wife of King Alfonso IX of León
- Infanta Maria Teresa of Braganza (1793–1874), daughter of King John VI of Portugal

== See also ==
- Theresa of Portugal (disambiguation)
