= Piccinni =

Piccinni is an Italian surname. Notable people with the surname include:

- Niccolò Piccinni (1728–1800), Italian composer
  - Teatro Piccinni, Italian theater in Bari, Apulia
- Louis Alexandre Piccinni (1779–1850), Italian-French composer, grandson of Niccolò

Notable people with the surname Piccini include:

- Achille Piccini (1911–1995), Italian football player
- Augusto Piccini (1854–1905), Italian chemist
- Cristiano Piccini (born 1992), Italian footballer, defender
- David Piccini (born 1988), Canadian politician
- Isabella Piccini (1664–1732), Italian nun and artist
- Teresa Piccini, Mexican ten-pin bowler who competed at the 2006 AMF World Cup

== See also ==
- Picini, tribe of American woodpeckers of the subfamily Picinae
