= Mario Rossi (conductor) =

Italian conductor

- Mario Rossi (photo with dedication)
- Born: 29 March 1902; Bitetto, Kingdom of Italy
- Died: 29 June 1992 (aged 90); Rome, Italy
- Occupation: conductor

Mario Rossi (29 March 1902 – 29 June 1992) was an Italian conductor, noted for his solid and meticulous readings of a repertoire ranging from Italian classics to Russian moderns such as Prokofiev, to the German operatic classicist Christoph Willibald Gluck.

== Life ==
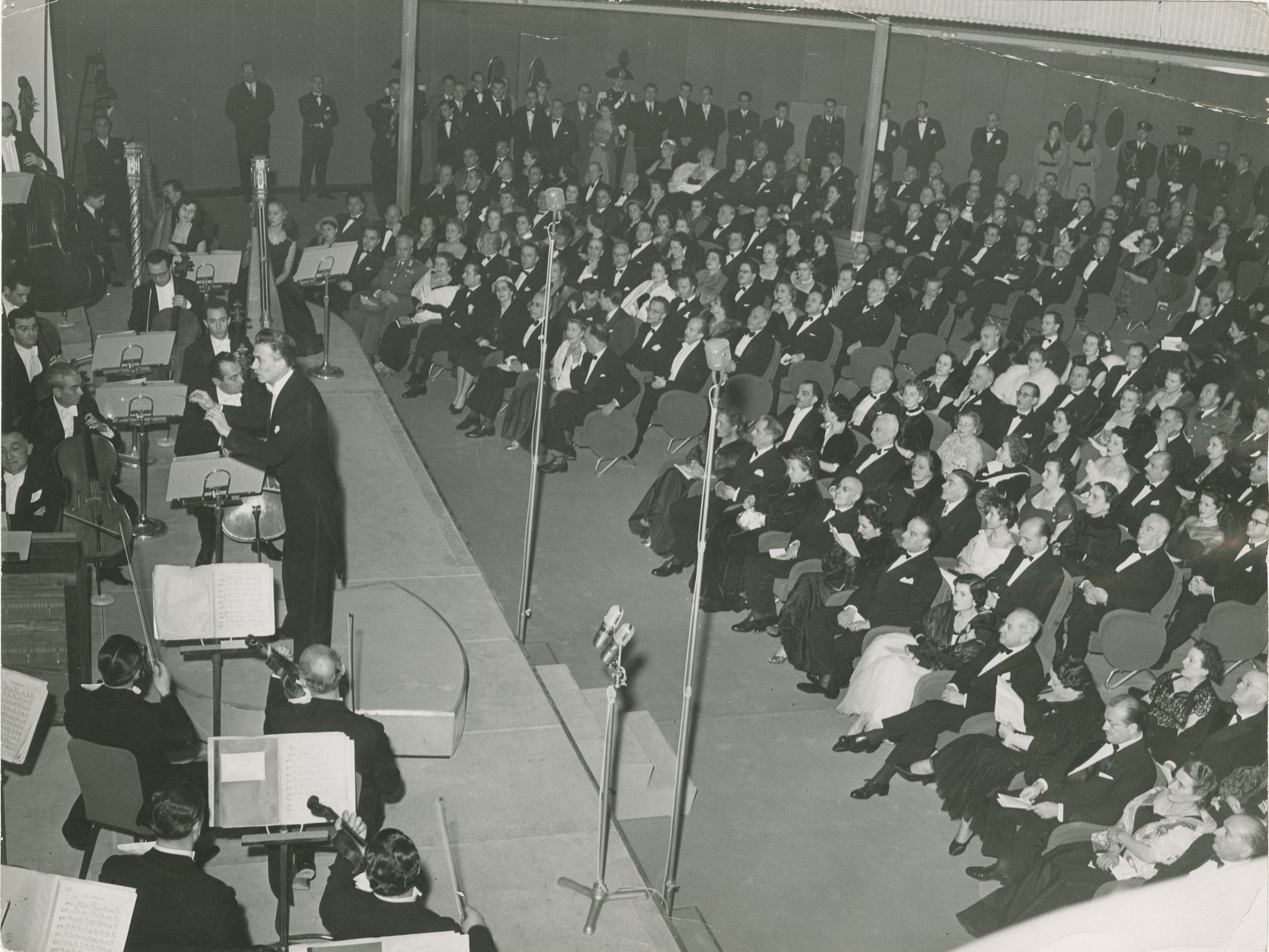
Mario Rossi conducting the inaugural concert of the Auditorium Rai in Turin on December 16, 1952.

Rossi was born on 29 March 1902 in Bitetto. He studied composition in Rome with Respighi and conducting with Giacomo Setaccioli, graduating in 1925, and soon after graduation he took up the post of assistant conductor to Bernardino Molinari. Appointed resident conductor of the Maggio Musicale Fiorentino in Florence (1937–46), he made his debut on the podium there in 1937 with Mascagni's Iris. The following year he led the premiere of Gian Francesco Malipiero's opera Antonio e Cleopatra.

He conducted in all the major opera houses of Italy. As well as establishing himself in the standard Italian repertory, he took part in many revivals of ancient works such as Galuppi's Il filosofo di campagna, Monteverdi's Il ritorno d'Ulisse in Patria, and Piccinni's La buona figliuola.

From 1946 until 1969, he served as chief conductor of the orchestra of the RAI in Turin. He elevated this group to an international level, making guest appearances in Brussels (1950), Vienna (1951), and Salzburg (1952). Amongst his performances on record were Il matrimonio segreto, Il barbiere di Siviglia, Don Pasquale, Un ballo in maschera, Otello, and Falstaff.

== Sources ==
- Le guide de l'opéra, Roland Mancini & Jean-Jacques Rouveroux, (Fayard, 1986) ISBN 2-213-01563-5
