= Joseph Katz (professor) =

American fluid dynamicist

- Born: Israel
- Title: William F. Ward Sr. Distinguished Professor

Academic background
- Education: California Institute of Technology
- Doctoral advisor: Allan J. Acosta
- Website: me.jhu.edu/faculty/joseph-katz/

Joseph Katz is an Israel-born American fluid dynamicist, known for his work on experimental fluid mechanics, cavitation phenomena and multiphase flow, turbulence, turbomachinery flows and oceanography flows, flow-induced vibrations and noise, and development of optical flow diagnostics techniques, including Particle Image Velocimetry (PIV) and Holographic Particle Image Velocimetry (HPIV).

As of 2005, he is the William F. Ward Sr. Distinguished Professor at the Department of Mechanical Engineering of the Whiting School of Engineering at the Johns Hopkins University.

== Education ==
1982: Ph.D. Mechanical Engineering, California Institute of Technology

1978: M.S. Mechanical Engineering, California Institute of Technology

1977: B.S. Mechanical Engineering, Tel-Aviv University

== Career and research ==
- 2015–Present: Vice Chair, Multiphase Flow Technical Committee, ASME Fluids Engineering Division
- 2009–Present: Fellow, American Physical Society
- 2005–Present: William F. Ward Sr. Distinguished Professor, Endowed Professorship, Johns Hopkins University
- 2000–Present: Whiting School Mechanical Engineering Professor, Endowed Professorship, Johns Hopkins University
- 1999–2011: Undergraduate Aerospace Concentration program, Johns Hopkins University, Department of Mechanical Engineering
- 1996–2001: Co-Director, Center for Environmental and Applied Fluid Mechanics, Johns Hopkins University
- 1996–1996: Co-Founder, Center for Environmental and Applied Fluid Mechanics, Johns Hopkins University
- 1994–1994: JANNAF Combustion Subcommittee -Workshop on LP Sensitivity, JANNAF Combustion Subcommittee -Workshop on LP Sensitivity
- 1994–Present: Professor, Johns Hopkins University, Department of Mechanical Engineering
- 1990–1993: Associate Professor, Johns Hopkins University, Department of Mechanical Engineering
- 1987–1990: Assistant Professor, Johns Hopkins University, Department of Mechanical Engineering
- 1983–1987: Assistant Professor, Purdue University
- 1983–1985: Visiting Associate, California Institute of Technology
- 1982–1982: Postdoctoral Research Fellow, California Institute of Technology
- 1982–Present: Fellow, American Society of Mechanical Engineers (ASME)

== Awards, honors, societies and journal editorships ==
- 2019: Elected Member, National Academy of Engineering, "for development of optical methods in experimental fluid mechanics for turbomachinery, cavitation, turbulence, and environmental flows"
- 2011: Johns Hopkins University: Gilman Scholar
- 2010: ASME: Fluids Eng. Division: Knapp Award - Best paper presented to the Fluids Engineering Division in 2010 dealing with analytical - numerical and laboratory research Engineering Division dealing with analytical - numerical and laboratory research
- 2009: American Physical Society: APS Fellow. Nominated by: Division of Fluid Dynamics. For his important contributions to our understanding of the underlying physics of a wide range of complex flows, including turbulent boundary layers, cavitating flows in rotating machinery, and flows in ocean and atmospheric environments; for his numerous transformative contributions to experimental techniques; and for his years of editorial service
- 2006: ASME: Fluids Eng. Division: Knapp Award - Best paper presented to the Fluids Engineering Division dealing with analytical - numerical and laboratory research
- 2005: ISI Science Citation Index: Highly Cited Article - in the top 1% within its field: 'Scale Invariance and Turbulence Models for LES' (Annu. Rev. Fluid Mech. 2000 - with C. Meneveau)
- 2004: ASME: Fluids Engineering Award
- 2004: Japan Society of Mechanical Engineers (JSME): Member of Advisory Board of the JSME International Journal
- 2001: American Waterjet Conference - Water Jet Technology Association (WJTA) - Best Paper -
- 2000: Tel-Aviv University: Senior Professor - Special Appointment
- 2000: Whiting School Mechanical Engineering Distinguished Professor - The Johns Hopkins University
- 1999: ASME: ASME Fellow
- 1992: ASME, Fluids Eng. Division: Lewis F. Moody Award - Best paper dealing with Engineering Practice
- 1985: National Science Foundation: Presidential Young Investigator Award
- 1984: National Science Foundation: Research Initiation Award

== Selected journal publications ==
- M.C. Boufadel, F. Cui, J. Katz, T. Nedwed, K. Lee, On the transport and modeling of dispersed oil under ice, Marine pollution bulletin 135 (2018) 569–580.
- N. Afshar-Mohajer, C. Li, A.M. Rule, J. Katz, K. Koehler, A laboratory study of particulate and gaseous emissions from crude oil and crude oil-dispersant contaminated seawater due to breaking waves, Atmospheric Environment (2018).
- N. Afshar-Mohajer, C. Li, A. Rule, J. Katz, K. Koehler, Particulate and Gaseous Emissions from Crude Oil and Crude Oil-Dispersant Contaminated Seawater due to Breaking Waves, Atmospheric Environment 179 (2018) 177–186.
- L. Zhao, M.C. Boufadel, J. Katz, G. Haspel, K. Lee, T. King, B. Robinson, A New Mechanism of Sediment Attachment to Oil in Turbulent Flows: Projectile Particles, Environmental Science and Technology 51(19) (2017) 11020–11028.
- C. Zhang, J. Wang, W. Blake, J. Katz, Deformation of compliant wall in a turbulent channel flow, Journal of Fluid Mechanics 823 (2017) 345–390.
- M.C. Viswanathan, W. Schmidt, M.J. Rynkiewicz, K. Agarwal, J. Gao, J. Katz, W. Lehman, A. Cammarato, Distortion of the Actin A-Triad Results in Contractile Disinhibition and Cardiomyopathy, Cell Reports 20(11) (2017) 2612–2625.
- H. Ling, M. Fu, M. Hultmark, J. Katz, Effect of Reynolds Number and Saturation Level on Gas Diffusion in and out of a Hierarchical Super-Hydrophobic Surface, Physical Review Fluids 2(12) (2017) Paper No. 124005.
- Y. Li, H. Chen, J. Katz, Measurements and Characterization of Turbulence in the Tip Region of an Axial Compressor Rotor, Journal of Turbomachinery 139(12) (2017) Paper No. 121003.
- C. Li, J. Miller, J. Wang, S.S. Koley, J. Katz, Size Distribution and Dispersion of Droplets Generated by Impingement of Breaking Waves on Oil Slicks, Journal of Physical Oceanography – Oceans 122(10) (2017) 7938–7957.
- H. Chen, Y. Li, D. Tan, J. Katz, Asme, Visualizations of Flow Structures in the Rotor Passage of an Axial Turbomachine at the Onset of Stall, Journal of Turbomachinery 139(4) (2017) paper No. 041008.
- H. Chen, Y. Li, S.S. Koley, N. Doeller, J. Katz, An Experimental Study of Stall Suppression and Associated Changes to the Flow Structures in the Tip Region of an Axial Low Speed Fan Rotor by Axial Casing Grooves, Journal of Turbomachinery 139(12) (2017) paper No. 121010.
- J. Biasetti, K. Sampath, A. Cortez, A. Azhir, A.A. Gilad, T.S. Kickler, T. Obser, Z.M. Ruggeri, J. Katz, Space and Time Resolved Detection of Platelet Activation and von Willebrand Factor Conformational Changes in Deep Suspensions, International Journal of Biomedical Imaging 2017 (2017) Paper No. 8318906.
- D.W. Murphy, X. Xue, K. Sampath, J. Katz, Crude oil jets in crossflow: Effects of dispersant concentration on plume behavior, Journal of Geophysical Research-Oceans 121(6) (2016) 4264–4281.
- H. Ling, S. Srinivasan, K. Golovin, G.H. McKinley, A. Tuteja, J. Katz, High-resolution velocity measurement in the inner part of turbulent boundary layers over super-hydrophobic surfaces, Journal of Fluid Mechanics 801 (2016) 670–703.
- C. Zhang, R. Miorini, J. Katz, Integrating Mach-Zehnder interferometry with TPIV to measure the time-resolved deformation of a compliant wall along with the 3D velocity field in a turbulent channel flow, Exp. Fluids 56(11) (2015).
- D. Tan, Y.C. Li, I. Wilkes, E. Vagnoni, R.L. Miorini, J. Katz, Experimental Investigation of the Role of Large Scale Cavitating Vortical Structures in Performance Breakdown of an Axial Waterjet Pump, J. Fluids Eng.-Trans. ASME 137(11) (2015).
- D. Tan, Y.C. Li, I. Wilkes, R.L. Miorini, J. Katz, Visualization and Time-Resolved Particle Image Velocimetry Measurements of the Flow in the Tip Region of a Subsonic Compressor Rotor, Journal of Turbomachinery-Transactions of the Asme 137(4) (2015).
- A.R. Nayak, C. Li, B.T. Kiani, J. Katz, On the wave and current interaction with a rippled seabed in the coastal ocean bottom boundary layer, Journal of Geophysical Research-Oceans 120(7) (2015) 4595–4624.
- D.W. Murphy, C. Li, V. d'Albignac, D. Morra, J. Katz, Splash behaviour and oily marine aerosol production by raindrops impacting oil slicks, Journal of Fluid Mechanics 780 (2015) 536–577.
- K. Bai, J. Katz, C. Meneveau, Turbulent Flow Structure Inside a Canopy with Complex Multi-Scale Elements, Boundary-Layer Meteorology 155(3) (2015) 435–457.
- H.J. Ling, J. Katz, Separating twin images and locating the center of a microparticle in dense suspensions using correlations among reconstructed fields of two parallel holograms, Applied Optics 53(27) (2014) G1-G11.
- P. Joshi, X.F. Liu, J. Katz, Effect of mean and fluctuating pressure gradients on boundary layer turbulence, Journal of Fluid Mechanics 748 (2014) 36–84.
- K.L. Bai, J. Katz, On the refractive index of sodium iodide solutions for index matching in PIV, Exp. Fluids 55(4) (2014).
- S. Talapatra, J. Katz, Three-dimensional velocity measurements in a roughness sublayer using microscopic digital in-line holography and optical index matching, Measurement Science & Technology 24(2) (2013).
- S. Talapatra, J. Hong, M. McFarland, A.R. Nayak, C. Zhang, J. Katz, J. Sullivan, M. Twardowski, J. Rines, P. Donaghay, Characterization of Biophysical Interactions in the Water Column Using In-Situ Digital Holography, Marine Ecology Progress Series 473 (2013) 29–51.
- Y. Lu, J. Katz, A. Prosperetti, Dynamics of cavitation clouds within a high-intensity focused ultrasonic beam, Physics of Fluids 25(7) (2013).
- X.F. Liu, J. Katz, Vortex-corner interactions in a cavity shear layer elucidated by time-resolved measurements of the pressure field, Journal of Fluid Mechanics 728 (2013) 417–457.
- K.L. Bai, C. Meneveau, J. Katz, Experimental study of spectral energy fluxes in turbulence generated by a fractal, tree-like object, Physics of Fluids 25(11) (2013).
- H. Wu, R.L. Miorini, D. Tan, J. Katz, Turbulence Within the Tip-Leakage Vortex of an Axial Waterjet Pump, AIAA Journal 50(11) (2012) 2574–2587.
- S. Talapatra, J. Katz, Coherent structures in the inner part of a rough-wall channel flow resolved using holographic PIV, Journal of Fluid Mechanics 711 (2012) 161–170.
- R.L. Miorini, H.X. Wu, J. Katz, The Internal Structure of the Tip Leakage Vortex Within the Rotor of an Axial Waterjet Pump, Journal of Turbomachinery-Transactions of the Asme 134(3) (2012).
- S.-Y. Hsu, J. Katz, M. Hilpert, Theoretical and experimental study of resonance of blobs in porous media, Geophysics 77((5)) (2012) EN61-EN71.
- J. Hong, S. Talapatra, J. Katz, P.A. Tester, R.J. Waggett, A.R. Place, Algal Toxins Alter Copepod Feeding Behavior, PLoS ONE 7((5): e36845) (2012).
- J. Hong, J. Katz, C. Meneveau, M.P. Schultz, Coherent structures and associated subgrid-scale energy transfer in a rough-wall turbulent channel flow, Journal of Fluid Mechanics 712 (2012) 92-128.
- K. Bai, C. Meneveau, J. Katz, Near-Wake Turbulent Flow Structure and Mixing Length Downstream of a Fractal Tree, Boundary-Layer Meteorology 143(2) (2012) 285–308.
- H.X. Wu, R.L. Miorini, J. Katz, Measurements of the tip leakage vortex structures and turbulence in the meridional plane of an axial water-jet pump, Exp. Fluids 50(4) (2011) 989–1003.
- H. Wu, D. Tan, R.L. Miorini, J. Katz, Three-Dimensional Flow Structures and Associated Turbulence in the Tip Region of a Waterjet Pump Rotor Blade, Exp. Fluids 51(6) (2011) 1721–1737.
- R. van Hout, J. Katz, Measurements of Mean Flow and Turbulence Characteristics in a High Reynolds Number Counter-Rotating Taylor-Couette Flow, Physics of Fluids (2011).
- J. Hong, J. Katz, M.P. Schultz, Near-wall turbulence statistics and flow structures over three-dimensional roughness in a turbulent channel flow, Journal of Fluid Mechanics 667 (2011) 1-37.
- E.E. Hackett, L. Luznik, A.R. Nayak, J. Katz, T.R. Osborn, Field measurements of turbulence at an unstable interface between current and wave bottom boundary layers, Journal of Geophysical Research-Oceans 116(C2) (2011).
- M.M. Zhang, J. Katz, A. Prosperetti, Enhancement of channel wall vibration due to acoustic excitation of an internal bubbly flow, J. Fluids Struct. 26(6) (2010) 994–1017.
- F. Soranna, Y.C. Chow, O. Uzol, J. Katz, The Effects of Inlet Guide Vane-Wake Impingement on the Boundary Layer and the Near-Wake of a Rotor Blade, Journal of Turbomachinery-Transactions of the ASME. Paper # 041016 132(4) (2010).
- J. Sheng, E. Malkiel, J. Katz, J.E. Adolf, A.R. Place, A dinoflagellate exploits toxins to immobilize prey prior to ingestion, Proc. Natl. Acad. Sci. U.S.A. 107(5) (2010) 2082–2087.
- Y. Lu, B. Gopalan, E. Celik, J. Katz, D.M. Van Wie, Stretching of turbulent eddies generates cavitation near a stagnation point, Physics of Fluids 22(4) (2010).
- J. Katz, J. Sheng, Applications of Holography in Fluid Mechanics and Particle Dynamics, Annual Review of Fluid Mechanics, Annual Reviews, Palo Alto, 2010, pp. 531–555.
- B. Gopalan, J. Katz, Turbulent Shearing of Crude Oil Mixed with Dispersants Generates Long Microthreads and Microdroplets, Physical Review Letters 104(5) (2010).
- I. Borazjani, F. Sotiropoulos, E. Malkiel, J. Katz, On the role of copepod antennae in the production of hydrodynamic force during hopping, J. Exp. Biol. 213(17) (2010) 3019–3035.
- J. Sheng, E. Malkiel, J. Katz, Buffer layer structures associated with extreme wall stress events in a smooth wall turbulent boundary layer, Journal of Fluid Mechanics 633 (2009) 17–60.
- E.E. Hackett, L. Luznik, J. Katz, T.R. Osborn, Effect of Finite Spatial Resolution on the Turbulent Energy Spectrum Measured in the Coastal Ocean Bottom Boundary Layer, Journal of Atmospheric and Oceanic Technology 26(12) (2009) 2610–2625.
- W. Yue, C. Meneveau, M.B. Parlange, W. Zhu, H.S. Kang, J. Katz, Turbulent kinetic energy budgets in a model canopy: comparisons between LES and wind-tunnel experiments, Environmental Fluid Mechanics 8(1) (2008) 73–95.
- R. van Hout, M. Chamecki, G. Brush, J. Katz, M.B. Parlange, The Influence of Local Meteorological Conditions on the Circadian Rhythm of Corn (Zea Mays L.) Pollen Dispersal into the Atmosphere, Agricultural and Forest Meteorology 148(6-7) (2008) 1078–1092.
- F. Soranna, Y.C. Chow, O. Uzol, J. Katz, Turbulence Within a Turbomachine Rotor Wake Subject to Nonuniform Contraction, Aiaa Journal 46(11) (2008) 2687–2702.
- M.R. Snyder, O.M. Knio, J. Katz, O.P. Le Maitre, Numerical study on the motion of microscopic oil droplets in high intensity isotropic turbulence, Physics of Fluids 20(7) (2008).
- J. Sheng, E. Malkiel, J. Katz, Using digital holographic microscopy for simultaneous measurements of 3D near wall velocity and wall shear stress in a turbulent boundary layer, Exp. Fluids 45(6) (2008) 1023–1035.
- X.F. Liu, J. Katz, Cavitation phenomena occurring due to interaction of shear layer vortices with the trailing corner of a two-dimensional open cavity, Physics of Fluids 20(4) (2008).
- B. Gopalan, E. Malkiel, J. Katz, Experimental investigation of turbulent diffusion of slightly buoyant droplets in locally isotropic turbulence, Physics of Fluids 20(9) (2008).
- W.H. Zhu, R. van Hout, J. Katz, PIV Measurements in the Atmospheric Boundary Layer Within and Above a Mature Corn Canopy-Part B: Quadrant-Hole Analysis, Journal of the Atmospheric Sciences 64(8) (2007) 2825–2838.
- W.H. Zhu, R. van Hout, J. Katz, On the flow structure and turbulence during sweep and ejection events in a wind-tunnel model canopy, Boundary-Layer Meteorology 124(2) (2007) 205–233.
- W.S. Yue, M.B. Parlange, C. Meneveau, W.H. Zhu, R. van Hout, J. Katz, Large-eddy simulation of plant canopy flows using plant-scale representation, Boundary-Layer Meteorology 124(2) (2007) 183–203.
- W.S. Yue, C. Meneveau, M.B. Parlange, W.H. Zhu, R. van Hout, J. Katz, A comparative quadrant analysis of turbulence in a plant canopy, Water Resources Research 43(5) (2007).
- R. van Hout, W. Zhu, L. Luznik, J. Katz, J. Kleissl, M.B. Parlange, PIV Measurements in the Atmospheric Boundary Layer Within and Above a Mature Corn Canopy-Part A: Statistics and Small Scale Isotropy, Journal of the Atmospheric Sciences 64(8) (2007) 2805–2824.
- O. Uzol, D. Brzozowski, Y.C. Chow, J. Katz, C. Meneveau, A database of PIV measurements within a turbomachinery stage and sample comparisons with unsteady RANS, J. Turbulence 8(10) (2007) 1-20.
- M.R. Snyder, O.M. Knio, J. Katz, O.P. Le Maitre, Statistical analysis of small bubble dynamics in isotropic turbulence, Physics of Fluids 19(6) (2007).
- J. Sheng, E. Malkiel, J. Katz, J.E. Adolf, R. Belas, A.R. Place, Prey-induced Changes in Swimming Behavior of Predatory Dinoflagellates, Journal of Phycology 43 (2007) 81.
- J. Sheng, E. Malkiel, J. Katz, J. Adolf, R. Belas, A.R. Place, Digital holographic microscopy reveals prey-induced changes in swimming behavior of predatory dinoflagellates, Proc. Natl. Acad. Sci. U.S.A. 104(44) (2007) 17512–17517.
- W.A.M. Nimmo Smith, J. Katz, T.R. Osborn, The Effect of Waves on Subgrid-Scale Stresses, Dissipation and Model Coefficients in the Coastal Ocean Bottom Boundary Layer, Journal of Fluid Mechanics 583 (2007) 133–160.
- L. Luznik, R. Gurka, W.A.M. Nimmo Smith, W. Zhu, J. Katz, T.R. Osborn, Distribution of energy spectra, Reynolds stresses, turbulence production, and dissipation in a tidally driven bottom boundary layer, J. Phys. Oceanogr. 37(6) (2007) 1527–1550.
- W. Zhu, R. van Hout, L. Luznik, H.S. Kang, J. Katz, C. Meneveau, A comparison of PIV measurements of canopy turbulence performed in the field and in a wind tunnel model, Exp. Fluids 41(2) (2006) 309–318.
- F. Soranna, Y.C. Chow, O. Uzol, J. Katz, The effect of inlet guide vanes wake impingement on the flow structure and turbulence around a rotor blade, Journal of Turbomachinery-Transactions of the Asme 128(1) (2006) 82–95.
- J. Sheng, E. Malkiel, J. Katz, Digital holographic microscope for measuring three-dimensional particle distributions and motions, Applied optics 45(16) (2006) 3893–3901.
- E. Malkiel, J.N. Abras, E.A. Widder, J. Katz, On the spatial distribution and nearest neighbor distance between particles in the water column determined from in situ holographic measurements, Journal of Plankton Research 28(2) (2006) 149–170.
- X.F. Liu, J. Katz, Instantaneous pressure and material acceleration measurements using a four-exposure PIV system, Exp. Fluids 41(2) (2006) 227–240.
- M. Hilpert, C.Y. Guo, J. Katz, Capillary dynamics of elastic-wave-enhanced two-phase flow in porous media, in: A.A. Atchley, V.W. Sparrow, R.M. Keolian (Eds.), Innovations in Nonlinear Acoustics, Amer Inst Physics, Melville, 2006, pp. 178–185.
- J. Chen; C. Meneveau; J. Katz (2006). "Scale interactions of turbulence subjected to a straining-relaxation-destraining cycle". Journal of Fluid Mechanics. 562: 123–150. Bibcode:2006JFM...562..123C. doi:10.1017/S0022112006000905. S2CID 123487892.
- W.A.M. Nimmo Smith, J. Katz, T.R. Osborn, On the structure of turbulence in the bottom boundary layer of the coastal ocean, J. Phys. Oceanogr. 35(1) (2005) 72–93.
- Y.C. Chow, O. Uzol, J. Katz, C. Meneveau, Decomposition of the spatially filtered and ensemble averaged kinetic energy, the associated fluxes and scaling trends in a rotor wake, Physics of Fluids 17(8) (2005).
- J. Chen, J. Katz, C. Meneveau, Implication of mismatch between stress and strain-rate in turbulence subjected to rapid straining and destraining on dynamic LES models, J. Fluids Eng.-Trans. ASME 127(5) (2005) 840–850.
- J. Chen, J. Katz, Elimination of peak-locking error in PIV analysis using the correlation mapping method, Measurement Science & Technology 16(8) (2005) 1605–1618.
- U. Anand, J. Katz, Porous, Lubricated Mixing Tube for Abrasive, Fluid Jet, USPTO, Baltimore, MD, 2005.
- R. van Hout, J. Katz, A method for measuring the density of irregularly shaped biological aerosols such as pollen, Journal of Aerosol Science 35(11) (2004) 1369–1384.
- J.R. Strickler, J.S. Hwang, E. Malkiel, J. Katz, A. Arnodin, Observing Zooplankters in situ using Optical Signal Processors, Journal of Sea Technology (Taiwan) 13(4) (2004) 31-44 (in Chinese).
- E. Malkiel, J.N. Abras, J. Katz, Automated scanning and measurements of particle distributions within a holographic reconstructed volume, Measurement Science & Technology 15(4) (2004) 601–612.
- S. Gopalan, B.M. Abraham, J. Katz, The structure of a jet in cross flow at low velocity ratios, Physics of Fluids 16(6) (2004) 2067–2087.
- U. Anand, J. Katz, Porous, Lubricated Nozzle for Abrasive Fluid Suspension Jet, in: Uspto (Ed.) The Johns Hopkins University (Baltimore, MD), Baltimore, MD, 2004.
- O. Uzol, Y.C. Chow, J. Katz, C. Meneveau, Average passage flow field and deterministic stresses in the tip and hub regions of a multistage turbomachine, Journal of Turbomachinery-Transactions of the Asme 125(4) (2003) 714–725.
- J. Sheng, E. Malkiel, J. Katz, Single beam two-views holographic particle image velocimetry, Applied optics 42(2) (2003) 235–250.
- E. Malkiel, I. Sheng, J. Katz, J.R. Strickler, The three-dimensional flow field generated by a feeding calanoid copepod measured using digital holography, J. Exp. Biol. 206(20) (2003) 3657–3666.
- U. Anand, J. Katz, Prevention of nozzle wear in abrasive water suspension jets (AWSJ) using porous lubricated nozzles, J. Tribol.-Trans. ASME 125(1) (2003) 168–180.
- F. van der Bos, B. Tao, C. Meneveau, J. Katz, Effects of small-scale turbulent motions on the filtered velocity gradient tensor as deduced from holographic particle image velocimetry measurements, Physics of Fluids 14(7) (2002) 2456–2474.
- O. Uzol, Y.C. Chow, J. Katz, C. Meneveau, Unobstructed particle image velocimetry measurements within an axial turbo-pump using liquid and blades with matched refractive indices, Exp. Fluids 33(6) (2002) 909–919.
- O. Uzol, Y.C. Chow, J. Katz, C. Meneveau, Experimental investigation of unsteady flow field within a two-stage axial turbomachine using particle image velocimetry, Journal of Turbomachinery-Transactions of the Asme 124(4) (2002) 542–552.
- B. Tao, J. Katz, C. Meneveau, Statistical geometry of subgrid-scale stresses determined from holographic particle image velocimetry measurements, Journal of Fluid Mechanics 457 (2002) 35–78.
- W.A.M. Nimmo Smith, P. Atsavapranee, J. Katz, T.R. Osborn, PIV measurements in the bottom boundary layer of the coastal ocean, Experiments in Fluids Journal 33(6) (2002) 962–971.
- C. Meneveau, J. Katz, A deterministic stress model for rotor-stator interactions in simulations of average-passage flow, J. Fluids Eng.-Trans. ASME 124(2) (2002) 550–554.
- S. Gopalan, J. Katz, H.L. Liu, Effect of gap size on tip leakage cavitation inception, associated noise and flow structure, J. Fluids Eng.-Trans. ASME 124(4) (2002) 994–1004.
- P.D. Friedman, J. Katz, Mean rise rate of droplets in isotropic turbulence, Physics of Fluids 14(9) (2002) 3059–3073.
- Y.C. Chow, O. Uzol, J. Katz, Flow non-uniformities and turbulent "Hot Spots" due to wake-blade and wake-wake interactions in a multi-stage turbomachine, Journal of Turbomachinery-Transactions of the Asme 124(4) (2002) 553–563.
- M. Sinha, A. Pinarbasi, J. Katz, The flow structure during onset and developed states of rotating stall within a vaned diffuser of a centrifugal pump, J. Fluids Eng.-Trans. ASME 123(3) (2001) 490–499.
- G.I. Roth, J. Katz, Five techniques for increasing the speed and accuracy of PIV interrogation, Measurement Science & Technology 12(3) (2001) 238–245.
- P.D. Friedman, A.L. Winthrop, J. Katz, Droplet formation and size distributions from an immiscible interface impinged with a vertical negatively buoyant jet, Atom. Sprays 11(3) (2001) 269–290.
- P. Doron, L. Bertuccioli, J. Katz, T.R. Osborn, Turbulence characteristics and dissipation estimates in the coastal ocean bottom boundary layer from PIV data, J. Phys. Oceanography. 31(8) (2001) 2108–2134.
- U. Anand, J. Katz, Using Porous Lubricated Nozzles to Prevent Nozzle Wear in Abrasive Water Suspension Jets (AWSJ), 2001.
- B. Tao, J. Katz, C. Meneveau, Geometry and scale relationships in high Reynolds number turbulence determined from three-dimensional holographic velocimetry, Physics of Fluids 12(5) (2000) 941–944.
- M. Sinha, J. Katz, C. Meneveau, Quantitative visualization of the flow in a centrifugal pump with diffuser vanes - II: Addressing passage-averaged and large-eddy simulation modeling issues in turbomachinery flows, J. Fluids Eng.-Trans. ASME 122(1) (2000) 108–116.
- M. Sinha, J. Katz, Quantitative Visualization of the Flow in a Centrifugal Pump with Diffuser Vanes-Part I: On flow structures and turbulence, J. Fluids Eng.-Trans. ASME 122(1) (2000) 97-107.
- C. Meneveau, J. Katz, Scale-invariance and turbulence models for large-eddy simulation, Annual Review of Fluid Mechanics 32 (2000) 1-32.
- S. Gopalan, J. Katz, Flow structure and modeling issues in the closure region of attached cavitation, Physics of Fluids 12(4) (2000) 895–911.
- P.D. Friedman, J. Katz, Rise height for negatively buoyant fountains and depth of penetration for negatively buoyant jets impinging an interface, J. Fluids Eng.-Trans. ASME 122(4) (2000) 779–782.
- S. Cerutti, O.M. Knio, J. Katz, Numerical study of cavitation inception in the near field of an axisymmetric jet at high Reynolds number, Physics of Fluids 12(10) (2000) 2444–2460.
- G. Sridhar, J. Katz, Effect of entrained bubbles on the structure of vortex rings, Journal of Fluid Mechanics 397 (1999) 171–202.
- G.I. Roth, D.T. Mascenik, J. Katz, Measurements of the flow structure and turbulence within a ship bow wave, Physics of Fluids 11(11) (1999) 3512–3523.
- C. Meneveau, J. Katz, Dynamic testing of subgrid models in large eddy simulation based on the Germano identity, Physics of Fluids 11(2) (1999) 245–247.
- C. Meneveau, J. Katz, Conditional subgrid force and dissipation in locally isotropic and rapidly strained turbulence, Physics of Fluids 11(8) (1999) 2317–2329.
- E. Malkiel, O. Alquaddoomi, J. Katz, Measurements of plankton distribution in the ocean using submersible holography, Measurement Science & Technology 10(12) (1999) 1142–1152.
- S.W. Liu, J. Katz, C. Meneveau, Evolution and modelling of subgrid scales during rapid straining of turbulence, Journal of Fluid Mechanics 387 (1999) 281–320.
- J. Katz, P. Donaghay, J. Zhang, S. King, K. Russell, Submersible holocamera for detection of particle characteristics and motions in the ocean, Deep-Sea Res. Part I-Oceanogr. Res. Pap. 46(8) (1999) 1455–1481.
- S. Gopalan, J. Katz, O. Knio, The flow structure in the near field of jets and its effect on cavitation inception, Journal of Fluid Mechanics 398 (1999) 1-43.
- P.D. Friedman, J. Katz, The flow and mixing mechanisms caused by the impingement of an immiscible interface with a vertical jet, Physics of Fluids 11(9) (1999) 2598–2606.
- L. Bertuccioli, G.I. Roth, J. Katz, T.R. Osborn, A submersible particle image velocimetry system for turbulence measurements in the bottom boundary layer, Journal of Atmospheric and Oceanic Technology 16(11) (1999) 1635–1646.
- X. Shi, O.M. Knio, J. Katz, Numerical study of shear-induced heating in high-speed nozzle flow of liquid monopropellant, J. Heat Transf.-Trans. ASME 120(1) (1998) 58–64.
- J. Zhang, B. Tao, J. Katz, Turbulent flow measurement in a square duct with hybrid holographic PIV, Exp. Fluids 23(5) (1997) 373–381.
- E.M. Pogozelski, J. Katz, T.T. Huang, The flow structure around a surface piercing strut, Physics of Fluids 9(5) (1997) 1387–1399.
- R.R. Dong, J. Katz, T.T. Huang, On the structure of bow waves on a ship model, Journal of Fluid Mechanics 346 (1997) 77-115.
- R. Dong, S. Chu, J. Katz, Effect of modification to tongue and impeller geometry on unsteady flow, pressure fluctuations, and noise in a centrifugal pump, Journal of Turbomachinery-Transactions of the Asme 119(3) (1997) 506–515.
- J. Katz, C. Meneveau, Wake-induced relative motion of bubbles rising in line, International Journal of Multiphase Flow 22(2) (1996) 239–258.
- L. Bertuccioli, S. Gopalan, J. Katz, Image shifting for PIV using birefringent and ferroelectric liquid crystals, Experiments in Fluids Journal 21(5) (1996) 341–346.
- G. Sridhar, J. Katz, Drag and lift forces on microscopic bubbles entrained by a vortex, Physics of Fluids 7(2) (1995) 389–399.
- S. Liu, C. Meneveau, J. Katz, Experimental-study of similarity subgrid-scale models of turbulence in the far-field of a jet, Appl. Sci. Res. 54(3) (1995) 177–190.
- S. Chu, R. Dong, J. Katz, Relationship between unsteady-flow, pressure-fluctuations, and noise in a centrifugal pump .2. effects of blade-tongue interactions, J. Fluids Eng.-Trans. ASME 117(1) (1995) 30–35.
- S. Chu, R. Dong, J. Katz, Relationship between unsteady-flow, pressure-fluctuations, and noise in a centrifugal pump .1. use of pdv data to compute the pressure field, J. Fluids Eng.-Trans. ASME 117(1) (1995) 24–29.
- B. Ran, J. Katz, Pressure-fluctuations and their effect on cavitation inception within water jets, Journal of Fluid Mechanics 262 (1994) 223–263.
- S.W. Liu, C. Meneveau, J. Katz, P.R. Voke, L. Kleiser, J.P. Chollet, Experimental study of similarity subgrid-scale models of turbulence in the far-field of a jet, Direct and Large-Eddy Simulation I 26 (1994) 37–48.
- S.W. Liu, C. Meneveau, J. Katz, On the properties of similarity subgrid-scale models as deduced from measurements in a turbulent jet, Journal of Fluid Mechanics 275 (1994) 83-119.
- T. Fu, A. Shekarriz, J. Katz, T.T. Huang, The Flow Structure in the Lee of an Inclined 6/1 Prolate Spheroid, Journal of Fluid Mechanics 269 (1994) 79-106.
- A. Shekarriz, T.C. Fu, J. Katz, T.T. Huang, Near-field behavior of a tip vortex, Aiaa Journal 31(1) (1993) 112–118.
- A. Shekarriz, T.C. Fu, J. Katz, H.L. Liu, T.T. Huang, Study of junction and tip vortices using particle displacement velocimetry, Aiaa Journal 30(1) (1992) 145–152.
- R. Dong, S. Chu, J. Katz, Quantitative Visualization of the Flow Within the Volute of a Centrifugal Pump-Part B: Results and Analysis, J. Fluids Eng.-Trans. ASME 114(3) (1992) 396–403.
- R. Dong, S. Chu, J. Katz, Quantitative Visualization of the Flow Within the Volute of a Centrifugal Pump-Part A: Technique, J. Fluids Eng.-Trans. ASME 114(3) (1992) 390–395.
- B. Ran, J. Katz, The response of microscopic bubbles to sudden changes in the ambient pressure, Journal of Fluid Mechanics 224 (1991) 91-115.
- K.C. Ward, J. Katz, Topology of the flow structures behind an inclined projectile. A, J. Aircr. 26(11) (1989) 1016–1022.
- K.C. Ward, J. Katz, Topology of the flow structures behind an inclined projectile. B, J. Aircr. 26(11) (1989) 1023–1031.
- K.C. Ward, J. Katz, Development of flow structures in the lee of an inclined body of revolution, J. Aircr. 26(3) (1989) 198–206.
- J. Katz, J.B. Galdo, Effect of Roughness on Rollup of Tip Vortices on a Rectangular Hydrofoil, J. Aircr. 26(3) (1989) 247–253.
- T.B. Francis, J. Katz, Observations on the Development of a Tip Vortex on a Rectangular Hydrofoil, Journal of Fluids Engineering 110(2) (1988) 208–215.
- H.J. Lin, J. Katz, Occurrence of Cavitation in Water Jets, Progress In Astronautics and Aeronautics; Liquid-Metal Flows: MHD and Applications 111 (1987) 585–604.
- J. Katz, T.J. Ohern, Cavitation in Large-Scale Shear Flows, J. Fluids Eng.-Trans. ASME 108(3) (1986) 373–376.
- J. Katz, Cavitation Phenomena within Regions of Flow Separation, Journal of Fluid Mechanics 140(MAR) (1984) 397–436.
- J. Katz, A. Acosta, Observations of Nuclei In Cavitating Flows, Appl. Sci. Res. 38 (1982) 123–132.
