= Terisa =

Terisa is a feminine given name, a variant of Teresa and Theresa.

Notable people with the name include:

- Terisa Greenan (born 1967), American film producer, film director, writer and stage and film actress
- Terisa Griffin, singer
- Terisa Ngobi, Samoan-New Zealander politician
- Terisa Siagatonu, Samoan singer
- Terisa Tang (1953–1995), Taiwanese singer, actress and musician
