= Theresia =

Theresia is the usual Dutch and German form of the name Teresa, and may refer to:

- Maria Theresia Ahlefeldt, (1755–1810) Danish composer
- Maria Theresia von Paradis, (1759–1824) Austrian pianist and composer
- Theresia of Dietrichstein (1768–1822), German countess and noted beauty
- Edith Stein (1891–1942), also known as St. Teresa Benedicta of the Cross, German Jewish philosopher, Roman Catholic nun, martyr and saint
- Theresia Bauer (born 1965), German politician
- Theresia Crone (born 2002), German activist and writer
- Theresia Degener (born 1961), German jurist and professor of law
- Theresia Gouw (born 1968), American entrepreneur and venture capital investor
- Theresia Haidlmayr (1955–2022), Austrian politician
- Theresia Kiesl (born 1963), Austrian retired middle distance runner
- Theresia van der Pant (1924–2013), Dutch sculptor
- Theresia Singer (fl. 1870–1891), opera singer
