= Geledés - Black Women's Institute =

Geledés - Black Women's Institute (Geledés - Instituto da Mulher Negra) is a Brazilian political organization of black women against racism and sexism. It is a civil society organization founded on April 30, 1988. Geledés main goal is to eradicate the discrimination present in society that affects black subjects, without discouraging the fight against all other forms of discrimination, such as homophobia, regional, creed, opinion and social class prejudices. Its name derives from the concept of gelede, female secret societies in Yoruba culture.

Geledés is one of the largest black feminism NGOs in Brazil with several campaigns and significant actions against racism. It operates in the areas of political and social action, in racial, gender, education, health, communication, the labor market, research, public policies and all interactions of these issues with human rights, developing own projects or in partnership with other organizations, and also keeping all its communication channels always updated, referring to all events related to the human rights sector, seeking to expand world news and information regarding ongoing projects.

== History ==
Geledés is originally a form of female religious society of a religious character existing in traditional Yoruba societies. It expresses female power over the fertility of the land, procreation and the well-being of the community.

Geledés was founded in 1988 in São Paulo, Brazil in order to stimulate a strategy to give visibility to Brazil's racial problem. Its founders were Solimar Carneiro, Edna Roland, Sueli Carneiro, Nilza Iraci, Ana Lucia Xavier Teixeira and Maria Lucia da Silva.

In the 90s, Geledés participated in several movements called by the UN with the objective of impelling governments and civil society to discuss the growing process of exclusion of the poor and discriminated populations, and thus began to develop numerous projects and social actions, consolidating the problem of black women and sexism in Brazilian society. It also boosted the debate on the need to adopt inclusive public policies to achieve the principle of equal opportunities and equal citizenship rights for all.

The organization has relevant political appearances in national, regional and international fields, always promoting the idea of highlighting the racism and sexism that exists in Brazilian society and the discrimination that exists in the world. Geledés' management is made up exclusively of black women, however it is possible to count on several work teams, in which participate men and women, black and white collaborators.

== Projects ==
SOS Racismo - It is a free legal assistance service that Geledés offers to victims of racial discrimination and sexual violence.

PLP 2.0 - A mobile application available to women victims of domestic violence. When executed, the application activates service networks, in addition to recording audios and videos, to acquire evidence of gender violence and offer quick assistance to victims.

Projeto Rappers - Developed from 1992 to 1998, it was a specific project for black youth. Based on questions regarding the prejudices suffered by youth rapper, Geledés decided to hold a lecture with different groups so that they could clear up any doubts. Since then, a pioneering partnership was born between NGOs and rap bands that became a reference for many experiences that later developed in the country.

Lesson Plans Contest - Geledés developed a lesson plan contest to encourage teachers from Brazilian public schools to teach topics on the history and culture of black populations.

Promotoras Legais Populares - Through the Popular Public Defenders project Geledés trained women leaders from poor communities of São Paulo in basic legal knowledge so that they could defend their rights as citizens. Project participants have become “popular public defendants”, providing legal assistance to people in the communities where they live.
