= Thereza Santos =

Brazilian writer

Jaci dos Santos, better known as Thereza Santos, (July 7, 1930 – December 19, 2012) was a Brazilian writer, actor, playwright, professor, and activist for women's rights and for the Black Movement of Brazil for over five decades.

== Biography ==
Santos was born in the Rio de Janeiro neighborhood of Santa Teresa to Antonio Luiz dos Santos, a civil servant, and Marta Martins dos Santos, a nurse. Her career as an actress began early: She appeared in her first film, O Cortiço, at age 15, and later appeared in the Oscar-winning Black Orpheus. Santos studied at the Faculdade Nacional de Filosofia (now the Federal University of Rio de Janeiro) and became a member of the National Union of Students, Brazil's largest student organization.

In this intellectual environment, she began to create works of street theater, with the goal of engaging audiences politically. She joined the Teatro Experimental do Negro, a theater company founded in rejection of blackface performances, in Rio and later in São Paulo. In the late 1960s, she co-founded the Centro de Cultura e Arte Negra (Center of Black Culture and Art). In the 1970s, during the military dictatorship, she co-wrote and staged with the sociologist Eduardo de Oliveira the piece E agora falamos nós ("And Now We Speak"), which is considered to be one of the first pieces of Brazilian theater written for an exclusively black cast. She was also involved in directing Carnival performances based in Afro-Brazilian culture.

In the 1960s, Santos also began to participate in the liberation movement for Portuguese-speaking African countries. She was imprisoned in the early 1970s for her work with the Brazilian Communist Party. After her release, she chose to leave Brazil. Santos rejected invitations to move to the then-Soviet Union and instead chose to self-exile in Africa, where she stayed for around five years. She actively participated in the liberation movements of Guinea-Bissau and Angola as a guerrilla. She also worked on cultural development and literacy projects, contributing to cultural reconstruction in Guinea-Bissau, Angola, and Cape Verde.

In the 1980s, she was the first black woman to be named to the State Council on the Female Condition in São Paulo. She was also an advisor on Afro-Brazilian culture to the secretary of culture for São Paulo state from 1986 until 2002.

In 1986, she was selected by the Black Women's Collective of São Paulo to run for the office of state deputy for the Brazilian Democratic Movement, but she was not elected. In September 1993, the city legislator Vital Nolasco of the Communist Party of Brazil awarded her the honorary title of Cidadã Paulistana.

Santos returned in her final years to Rio, where she died in 2012. She had one son, Jorge Omir. Today, her collection of books, magazines, statues, paintings, handicrafts, photographs, and personal correspondence is on display at the Federal University of São Carlos in São Paulo.

== Selected works ==
- Malunga Thereza Santos: a história de vida de uma guerreira, autobiography (2008). ISBN 978-85-7600-116-4.
- Mulher negra. Política governmental e a mulher, co-authored with Sueli Carneiro and Albertina de Oliveira Costa (1985). ISBN 978-85-213-0312-1.

== Filmography ==
- Uma Aventura: Uma Aventura na Cidade (2000).
- O Dia do Músico (short, 1996).
- E As Pílulas Falharam (1976).
- Mulheres de Areia (soap opera, 1973).
- Signo da Esperança (soap opera, 1972).
- A Fábrica (TV series, 1971).
- Cleo e Daniel (1970).
- Nino, o Italianinho (soap opera, 1969)
- Orfeu negro (1959).
- Obrigado, Doutor (1948).
- O Cortiço (1945).
