= Teréz =

- Gender: female
- Language: Hungarian
- Name day: 15 October

Origin
- Language: Greek
- Meaning: to harvest

Other names
- Nicknames: Terus, Teca
- Derived: θερίζω (therízō)
- Related names: Terézia, Teresa, Theresa, Teriza, Thérèse

Teréz is a Hungarian feminine given name of Greek origin. It is a cognate of the English language Teresa.

== Notable people named Teréz ==
- Teréz Brunszvik (1775–1861), Hungarian noblewoman
- Teréz Csillag (1859–1925), Hungarian actress
- Teréz Ferenczy (1823–1853), Hungarian poet
- Teréz Karacs (1808–1892), Hungarian writer, educator, memoirist, and women's rights activist
