= Teresa Toda =

Basque journalist (born 1950)

- Teresa Toda
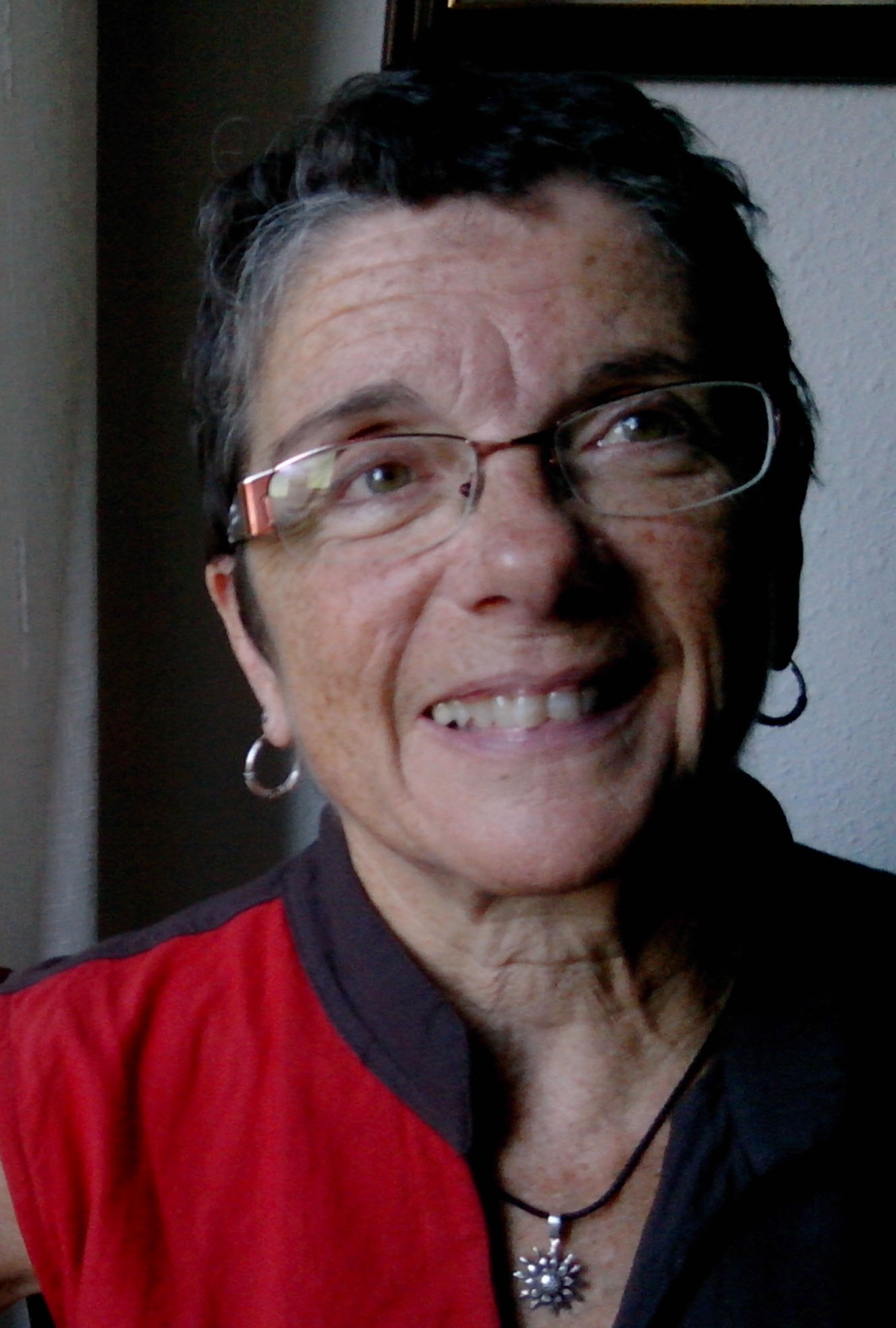
- Born: June 25, 1950 (age 75); Porto Alegre, Brazil
- Occupation: Journalist

Teresa Toda (Porto Alegre, Brazil, June 24, 1950) is a Basque journalist.

== Biography ==
Her father was a Spanish diplomat. During her childhood and youth, she lived in Chile, in Brazil, in the United States (Los Angeles), and in London. In 1968, she began studying journalism in Spain, at the University of Navarre, which was run by the Catholic Opus Dei. She became involved in left-wing, nationalist and anti-Franco politics, for which she was expelled together with around 40 other students. She returned to London where she worked for The Law Society Gazette and then at Visnews (television news agency). In 1971, she returned to Madrid to finish her education and worked at the daily paper ABC, thus getting to know the difficulties of journalism under Franco. Later on, she moved to Barcelona, where she worked at the Press Office of CCOO, a left wing trade union, during the first years of the Spanish "transition". She collaborated in a Catalan weekly as well.

She began working as a correspondent for Egin, the Basque newspaper, in Madrid in 1984. In 1989, after the shooting of two Basque MP's in Madrid as they were having supper, (one of them, Josu Muguruza, was also her editor in Egin), she had to move to the Basque Country. She worked first as editor of the Basque political section and, from 1992 to 1998, as assistant editor in chief. Egin was shut down by the judge Baltasar Garzón in July 1998. The shutting down of the paper entailed judicial proceedings against the editor in chief, eight members of the board and Teresa Toda. While awaiting trial, she worked at the magazine of LAB, an independentist Basque trade union. During those years, she became a member of the Board of Basque PEN, and became involved in activities in defence of freedom of speech and expression at diverse levels.

The trial began in 2005 at the Special Anti-Terrorist Court in Madrid. They received harsh sentences, which the Supreme Court later on cut down. She finally served six full years, all of them in prisons very far from her home. During that time, she kept up her relationship with Basque PEN and, through them, with PEN International; She received tens of letters and cards every Christmas from writers all over the world, and she herself wrote letters supporting imprisoned Kurdish journalists. She was released in 2013, and since then she has resumed her activities at the Board of Basque PEN and in favor of freedom of speech.

She has also translated several books on conflict resolution, from English to Spanish.
