= Eliades Acosta =

Cuban politician

Eliades Acosta Matos (born January 4, 1959, in Santiago de Cuba) is a Cuban politician, the former director of Cuba's Jose Marti National Library (1997–2007) and until 2003 he was head of Committee on Culture on the Cuban Communist Party’s Central Committee. Writer polítical and histórical books, articules and essays included three novels. Since 2010 living in Dominican Republic, and working for the National Archive and Juan Bosch Foundation. In 2012, International Prix Pedro Henriquez Ureña, Ateneo Dominicano. In 2016, Prix Caonabo de Oro, for the best foreigner writer in Dominican Republic this year.
