= Joe Acosta =

Puerto Rican Salsa musician (1950–2020)

- Joe Acosta, 2006

Background information
- Born: October 31, 1950; Santurce, Puerto Rico
- Origin: New York, New York, United States
- Died: April 6, 2020 (aged 69) New York
- Genres: Salsa
- Occupation(s): Musician, songwriter
- Instrument: Piano
- Years active: 1969–????
- Labels: Ghetto
- Website: joeacostaband.com

Joe Acosta (October 31, 1950 – April 6, 2020) was a salsa piano player and one of the pioneers of Latin music in the United States in the early 1970s.

Born in Santurce, San Juan, Puerto Rico, Acosta migrated to New York City in 1953 and settled in East Harlem, a neighborhood with many salsa musicians.

Acosta started his first band in 1969. During his tenure at MSM he also played with many of the local bands including Johnny Colon's Band (playing both trombone and piano), The TNT Band, The Latinjazzmen, and Joe Bataan.

In the early 1970s, Acosta became more successful and recorded his first LP, The Power of Love, on Ghetto Records. Acosta wrote most of the tunes, including the 21-week Billboard Latin Top 10 single "I Need Her." By the end of the 1970s, Acosta and his band had recorded the LP's Asi Soy Yo and Encore and performed in Puerto Rico, Spain, Colombia and Venezuela. Acosta also enjoyed playing salsa and Latin jazz on many recordings for SMC-Pro Arte records. He also recorded the Ray Rivera hit "Listen to Louie" for SMC Pro-Arte.

During his musical career, Acosta played and recorded with Joe Quijano, Tony Pabon and La Protesta, Bobby Rodriguez, Joe Cuba, Orchestra Flamboyan, Vitin Aviles, Ismael Rivera, Orchestra Broadway, Yomo Toro and Mon Rivera. Acosta write and arranged songs for many artists including the Jonas Brothers "Chillin in the Summertime" for Disney's Jonas L.A. TV show in July, 2010.

Acosta lived in Yonkers, New York, and died on April 6, 2020, after contracting the COVID-19 virus.
