= Theresia Crone =

German activist and writer

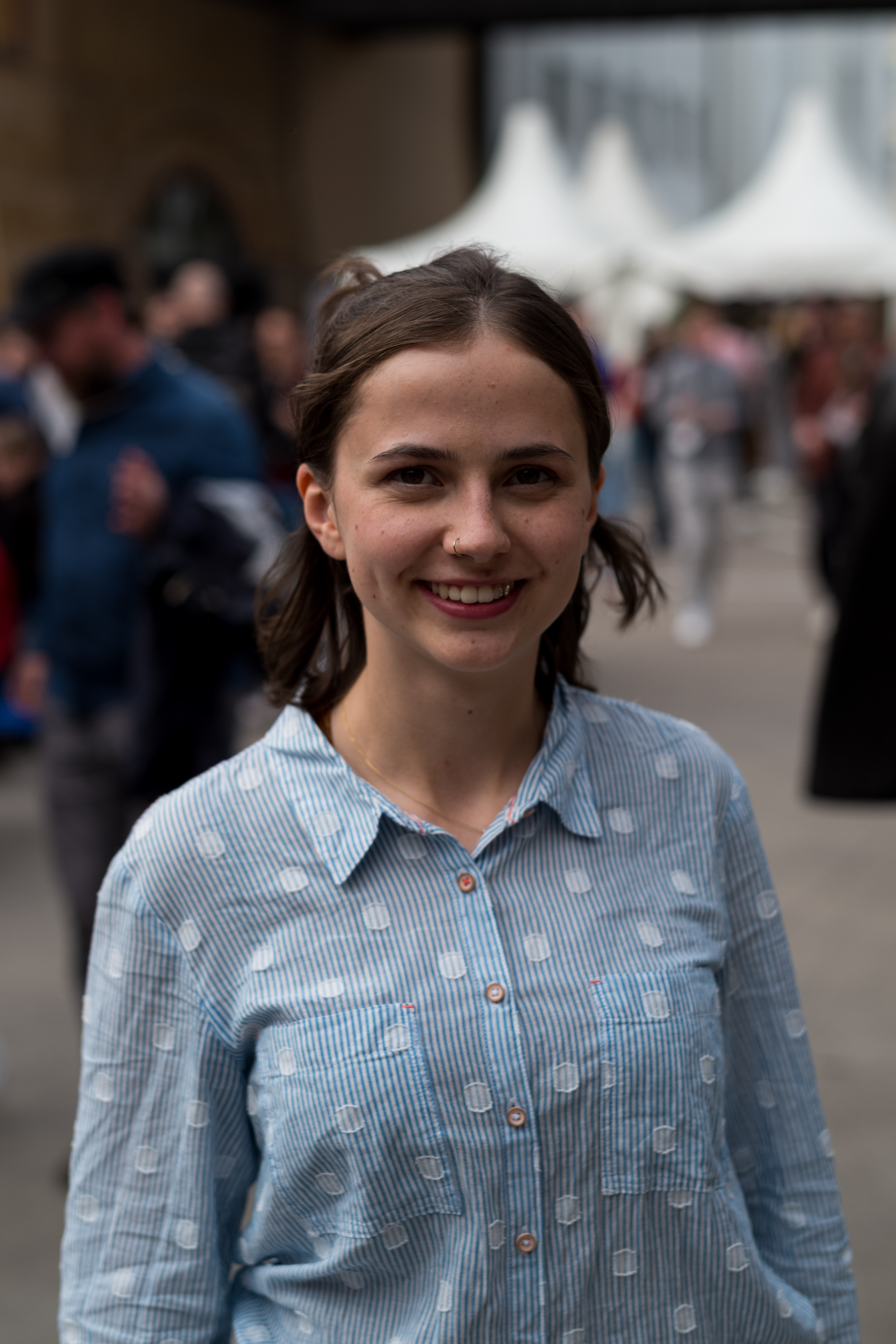
- Crone in 2025
- Born: 2002 (age 23–24); Schwerin, Germany
- Occupations: Activist, writer
- Known for: Climate activism, #EndEndoSilence, #ReclaimTikTok, digital rights advocacy

Theresia Crone (born 2002) is a German activist and writer. She has been active in climate politics since 2019 and has also campaigned on endometriosis awareness, democratic participation on social media, and legal protection against non-consensual sexualised deepfakes.

== Early life and education ==
Crone was born in Schwerin in 2002 and grew up there. In 2021 she was listed as studying German-French law in Cologne. Profiles by re:publica and TINCON later described her as having studied German and French law in Cologne and Paris.

== Climate activism ==
Crone became active in climate campaigning in 2019. The programme for the 2021 FiSH Filmfestival described her as active with Fridays for Future and as a member of the Future Council of Mecklenburg-Western Pomerania.

In January 2021, Der Spiegel reported that Crone resigned as chair of the state's Council for Environment and Sustainability after the government of Mecklenburg-Western Pomerania supported the creation of a climate and environmental foundation connected to the completion of Nord Stream 2.

== Endometriosis activism ==
In 2022, Crone founded the #EndEndoSilence campaign, which called for greater public awareness of endometriosis, improved treatment and more research funding. According to the Deutscher Engagementpreis profile, the campaign's petition received 50,000 signatures within 48 hours and more than 100,000 within 13 days.

EndEndoSilence later became a registered association. Its stated demands include better medical care, more public education and increased research funding for endometriosis. In 2025, EndEndoSilence received the Deutscher Engagementpreis.

== #ReclaimTikTok and digital campaigning ==
Ahead of the 2024 European Parliament election, Crone took part in the #ReclaimTikTok campaign, which sought to increase democratic and progressive political content on TikTok. In 2025 she spoke at TINCON and re:publica on right-wing content and political communication on TikTok.

== Advocacy against sexualised deepfakes ==
Crone has publicly described being targeted by non-consensual sexualised deepfakes and fake online profiles. She has since advocated for stronger legal protection against such abuse.

In March 2026, Euronews reported that Crone spoke at a Berlin demonstration against sexualised digital violence and deepfakes. The report said organisers put attendance at around 13,000, while police gave a figure of around 6,700 participants.

== Awards ==
- 2025: Deutscher Engagementpreis, for EndEndoSilence
