= Martha Acosta =

Peruvian politician (born 1962)

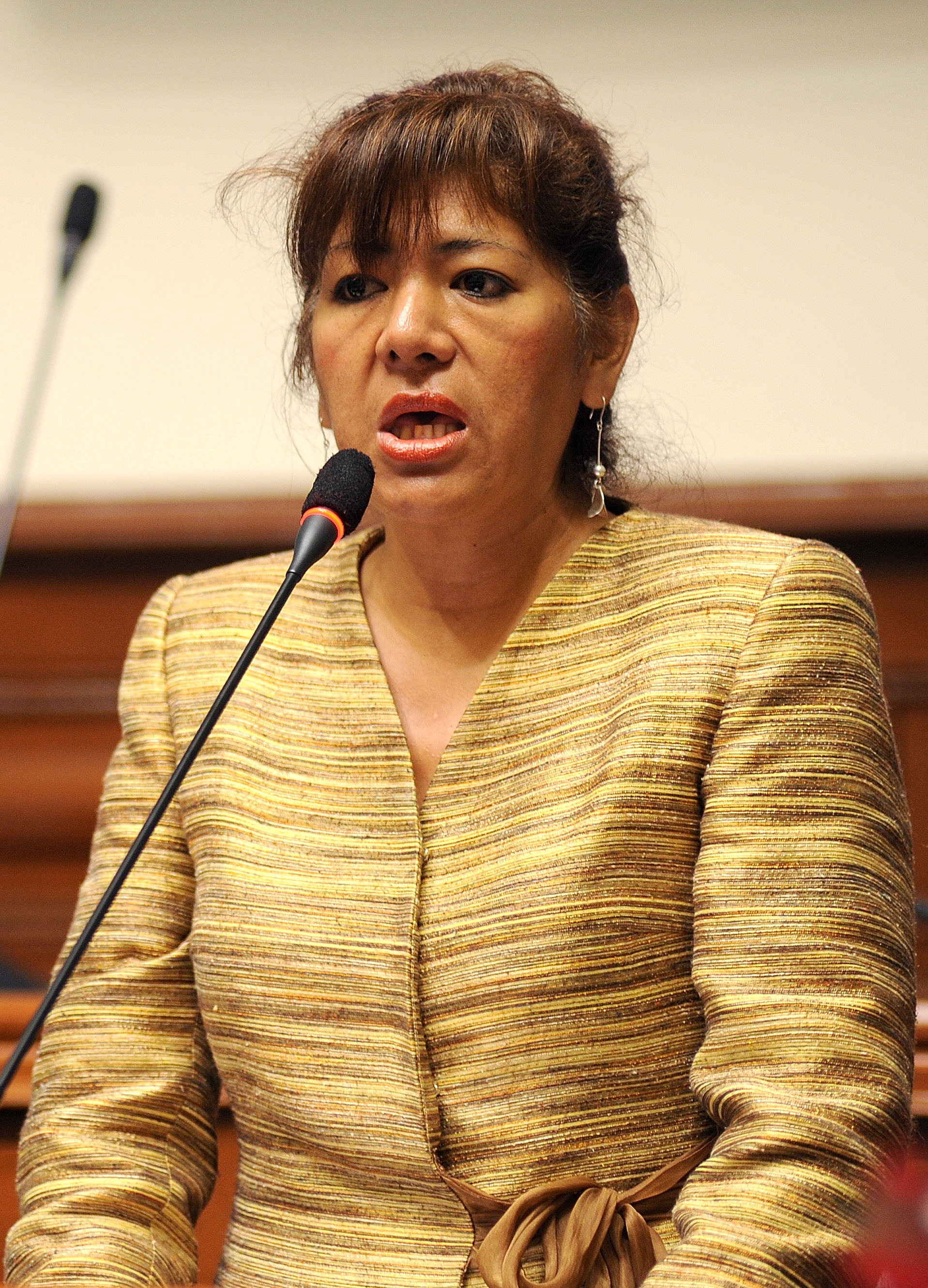
Martha Acosta

Martha Carolina Acosta Zárate (born September 30, 1962, in Concepción, Junín) is a Peruvian politician and a Congresswoman representing Junín for the 2006–2011 term. Acosta belongs to the Union for Peru party.
