= Teresian =

Teresian may refer to:

== Religion ==
- the Catholic order of Discalced Carmelites
- the Catholic Teresian Association
- anything else associated with Saint Teresa of Avila

== Biology ==
- the plant species Teresianus
