= Iván Acosta =

Nicaraguan politician

Iván Acosta Montalván
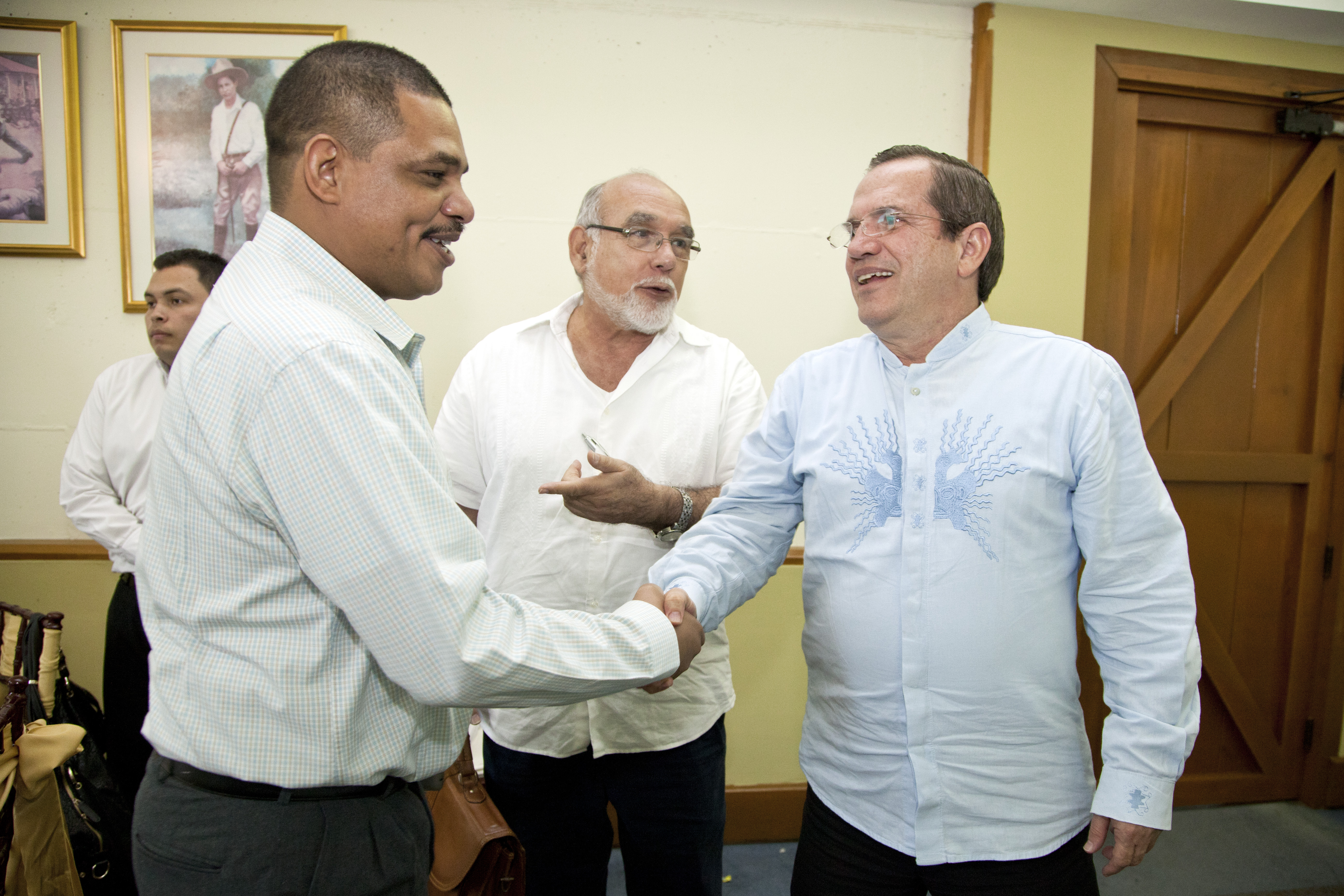
- Acosta on left

Minister of Finance
- Incumbent
- Assumed office February 2012
- President: Daniel Ortega
- Preceded by: Alberto Guevara Obregón

Personal details
- Born: Iván Adolfo Acosta Montalván; September 28, 1964 (age 61) Bluefields, Nicaragua
- Party: FSLN
- Education: National Autonomous University of Nicaragua

Iván Acosta Montalván is a Nicaraguan politician and the Minister of Finance in the administration of Daniel Ortega since February 2012.

Acosta was born in Bluefields on 28 September 1964. He has degrees in economics, and law, and a master's degree in business law. From the National Autonomous University of Nicaragua he holds a PhD in social sciences and a law degree. In 2011 he graduated with a master's degree in business law at the National Autonomous University of Nicaragua. Supreme Court of Justice of Nicaragua empowered him to practice lawyer and notary public in 2006.

Acosta started working in the Ministry of Finance and Public Credit in 2007, including the portfolios of secretary general and deputy minister of finance in 2009. He was appointed as Minister of Finance in February 2012, and he is also the governor for Nicaragua in the World Bank and a member of the board of directors of the Central Bank of Nicaragua.
