= Teresa Vila =

Uruguayan visual artist (1931–2009)

- Born: 1931; Montevideo, Uruguay
- Died: July 3, 2009 (aged 77–78); Montevideo, Uruguay
- Known for: Painting, Engraving, Visual Arts

Teresa Vila (1931 – 3 July 2009) was a Uruguayan visual artist known for her work in abstract art, painting, engraving, and experimental "acciones" (art actions). Active from the 1960s, Vila played a key role in the development of Latin American avant-garde art. Her works are characterized by their engagement with themes of time, space, and interaction with the audience.

== Early life and education ==
Vila was born in Montevideo, Uruguay, in 1931. Details about her early life and formal education in the arts remain limited, but she developed an early interest in visual art that led her to explore various mediums and styles. Her father was a local artisan, and Vila later cited his influence as pivotal in her early artistic endeavors.

== Career ==
=== Early abstract work ===
In the early 1960s, Vila began creating abstract works, a period known as "Los años abstractos" (1961–1968). During this time, she experimented with geometric forms, bold colors, and intricate compositions. Her works from this era contributed significantly to Uruguay's abstract art movement and helped establish her reputation.

=== Transition to experimental art ===
In the late 1960s, Vila's art began to evolve beyond traditional painting and engraving. Inspired by the international movements toward conceptual and performance art, she started creating "acciones" or actions—performance-based works that involved audience participation and were often site-specific. These pieces aimed to challenge the conventions of visual art by making the viewer a part of the artistic experience.

Vila's actions were innovative in Latin America, combining elements of spatial and temporal interaction with minimalist aesthetics. Her performances in this period have since been recognized as essential contributions to Latin American performance art.

=== Later work and legacy ===
Vila continued to produce art and perform her "acciones" well into the 1980s. Her influence within the Uruguayan and Latin American art communities was considerable, as she mentored younger artists and contributed to the regional avant-garde. Her legacy was later celebrated in a retrospective exhibit at the Museo Juan Manuel Blanes, titled Teresa Vila: Arte y Tiempo, which provided an extensive look into her body of work.

Vila died in Montevideo on 3 July 2009. In a tribute, art critic Nelson Di Maggio described her as a "vanguardista, descollante pintora y grabadora" ("vanguard artist, outstanding painter, and engraver"), underscoring her lasting impact on the art world.

== Style and themes ==
Teresa Vila's work is noted for its exploration of abstract forms and its engagement with space and time. Her paintings often feature geometric designs with a strong emphasis on color. In her later "acciones," Vila broke away from traditional media, engaging directly with audiences and addressing the spatial relationship between artwork and viewer.

Her works and actions addressed themes of perception, interaction, and the passage of time, reflecting broader trends within the Latin American avant-garde movement.

== Selected works ==
- "Los años abstractos" (1961–1968): Series of abstract paintings using geometric forms and color.
- "Acciones" Series: Experimental performances involving audience participation and environmental interaction.

== Principal exhibitions ==
- 1951: XIV National Salon
- 1955: III São Paulo Biennial
- 1955: 19 Artists Today, Subte Municipal, Montevideo
- 1956: IV International Biennial of Color Lithography, Cincinnati Art Museum
- 1956: VIII Municipal Salon, Acquisition Award for her lithograph Garden
- 1956: XX National Salon, Third Prize -Bronze Medal in Drawing, Engraving, and Illustrations Section- for her ink drawing on paper Table Light
- 1957: IX Municipal Salon, Acquisition Award for her ink drawing Table with Objects
- 1957: XXI National Salon, Third Prize -Bronze Medal in Drawing, Engraving, and Illustrations Section- for her color lithographs Patio with Plants and Green Garden
- 1957: Solo exhibition at Club de Teatro Gallery, Montevideo
- 1957: IV São Paulo Biennial
- 1958: I Inter-American Biennial of Painting and Printmaking, National Institute of Fine Arts, Mexico
- 1959: X Municipal Salon, Montevideo
- 1960: II Inter-American Biennial of Painting and Printmaking, National Institute of Fine Arts, Mexico
- 1961: Solo exhibition at Amigos del Arte, Montevideo
- 1961: 2nd Biennial of Young Artists, Museum of Modern Art, Paris
- 1958: I Inter-American Biennial of Painting and Printmaking, National Institute of Fine Arts, Mexico
- 1959: X Municipal Salon, Montevideo
- 1960: II Inter-American Biennial of Painting and Printmaking, National Institute of Fine Arts, Mexico
- 1961: Solo exhibition at Amigos del Arte, Montevideo
- 1961: 2nd Biennial of Young Artists, Museum of Modern Art, Paris
- 1963, XXVII National Salon
- 1964, Solo exhibition at General Electric Institute, Montevideo
- 1965, Museum of Fine Arts and Ateneo de Caracas, Venezuela
- 1965, Young Painters of Uruguay, South American Gallery, New York
- 1965, II American Biennial of Engraving, Santiago Museum of Contemporary Art, Chile
- 1965, Exhibited with Nelson Ramos at the Arts and Letters Center, Punta del Este
- 1965, Latin American Painting, Dallas Museum of Art
- 1965: South American Art Collection Braniff, University of Texas at Austin
- 1966: The Emergent Decade: Latin American Painters and Painting in the 1960s, curated by Thomas M. Messer, Solomon R. Guggenheim Museum, New York
- 1966: Solo exhibition at Uruguayan Cultural Promotion Center, Montevideo
- 1966: XXX National Salon, Third Prize -Silver Medal in Painting Section- for her work Napalm, early 1965
- 1967: XV Municipal Salon, Acquisition Award for her painting and collage on canvas Vital Machine
- 1967: Latin American Gallery, Havana, Cuba
- 1967: VII International Biennial of Engraving, Ljubljana
- 1969: VIII International Biennial of Engraving, Ljubljana
- 1969: VIII International Drawing Exhibition, Rijeka Museum, Yugoslavia
- 1969-73: Joan Miró Drawing Award, Barcelona
- 1971: The Sidewalks of the Small Homeland, solo exhibition at Galería U and Circular Theatre, Montevideo
- 1973: II International Biennial of Graphic Arts, Cali, Colombia
- 1974: V Print Biennial, Krakow, Poland
