= Theresa Sareo =

American singer-songwriter

Theresa Sareo is a New York-based singer/songwriter. She performs and speaks regularly for the United States Military, and at hospitals, schools and corporations worldwide.

== Life and career ==
Sareo has released three self-produced albums, an eponymous debut in 1998, Embrace in 2000, and 2005's Alive Again. She has also written and performed music for former Secretary of State Hillary Rodham Clinton, and was a keynote speaker at a national press conference on health care in 2007 with then NY Senators Clinton and Charles Schumer.

In June 2002, Sareo was struck by an impaired driver in Manhattan. She was in a coma for five days, and her injuries forced the amputation of her right leg. She uses a prosthetic leg, which she named Lola. While undergoing physical therapy at Walter Reed Army Medical Center, Sareo interacted with American soldiers who had also lost limbs in the Iraq War. These interactions inspired her to work with wounded veterans and to write the song "Through a Soldier's Eyes. She has since worked with wounded veterans as a motivational speaker; her work garnered her the Walter Reed Medal of Strength and Courage.

Sareo became the first civilian performer to sing the National Anthem at Walter Reed Army Hospital in Washington, D.C. and at the U.S. Army Warrior Transition Units; European Command, sponsored by the Army's Dept. of Ministries.

In 2010 she went on a European concert tour for American soldiers, which was sponsored by the Warrior Transition Battalion Europe and the U.S. Army Europe Chaplains Corps.

Since the accident she has also become a motivational speaker, and has appeared on Today, CNN's Larry King Live and in New York Magazine.

== Documentary ==
Her documentary film Theresa Sareo: Alive Again chronicles her life and career and won "Audience Choice for Best Documentary" (2012 Gasparilla International Film Festival—Tampa) and "Best Director of a Documentary (2012 NY International Film Festival—L.A. Edition) awards. It is produced by Evan Ginzburg, first-time director Rye Joseph and Sareo.
