= Churromania =

Venezuelan churro franchise

ChurroMania
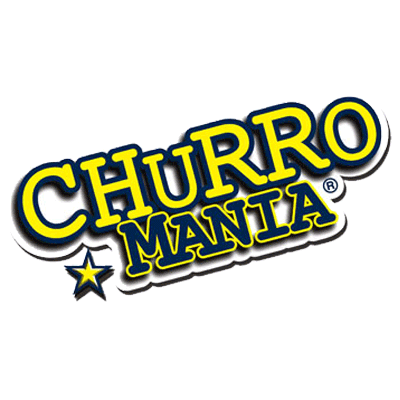

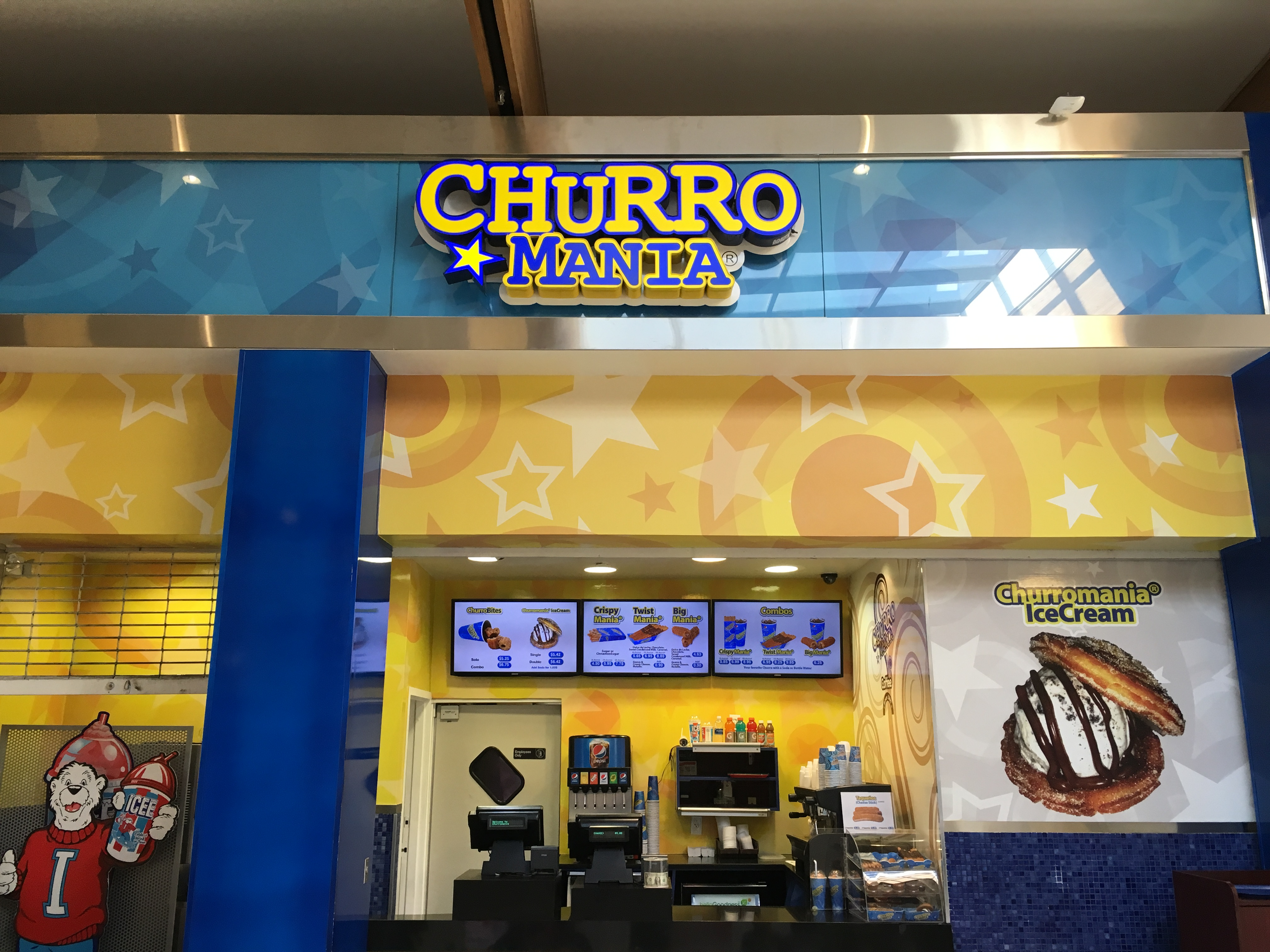
- Westland Mall location
- Type: Privately held company
- Founded: 1997; 29 years ago
- Headquarters: Miami, Florida, United States
- Owner: ChurroMania International Holding LLC
- Website: churromania.com

Churromania is an international franchise of churro stores founded by Venezuelan Ariel Acosta-Rubio, and his wife Maria Alejandra Bravo in 1997.

Churromania is owned and operated by ChurroMania International Holding, LLC, and currently has more than 120 franchises in Venezuela, the US and a few other Latin American countries.

== History ==
Ariel Acosta-Rubio and Maria Alejandra Bravo opened their first churro stand in Anzoátegui, Puerto La Cruz, a city in Venezuela. After experiencing mild success, they set a goal to "take Churromania to each corner of Venezuela and the World."

With the second store open popularity grew across the country and Churromania was able to open 15 more stores in less than a year and a half. Now based in Miami, Florida, Co-founder Acosta-Rubio and his wife Maria Bravo have opened up approximately 120 more stores and started marketing themselves nationally with the inclusion of American-based franchises having the Hispanic market as their main target. The organization began US operations in 2001 in Miami.

== Guinness World Records ==
On December 12, 2025, Churromania achieved a Guinness World Record for the world's longest churro. The record was officially awarded to the company's founders, Ariel Acosta-Rubio and María Alejandra Bravo, after producing a continuous churro measuring 502 feet (153.21 meters).
