= Tomás Diez Acosta =

Tomás Diez Acosta (born 1946 - died 17 April 2023) was a Cuban revolutionary soldier and a teacher and writer of history.

Tomás Diez Acosta joined Cuba's Revolutionary Armed Forces in 1961. From 1970 to 1986 he taught history at a Military Academy in Cuba, and has been head of the Department of Military History. He also holds a degree in political science. Diez retired from active military service in 1998 with the rank of lieutenant colonel.

Diez has written many books on the history of revolutionary Cuba, some of which have been translated to English, including October 1962: The 'Missile' Crisis As Seen From Cuba, published by Pathfinder Press, New York City, 2002.

== Books ==
- Diez Acosta, Tomás (2002). October 1962 : the "missile" crisis as seen from Cuba (1st ed.). New York: Pathfinder. ISBN 0-87348-956-X.
- Diez Acosta, Tomás (2002). In the threshold of nuclear war : the 1962 missile crisis. Ciudad de La Habana, Cuba: Editorial José Martí. ISBN 959-09-0198-0.
- Diez Acosta, Tomás (1997). La guerra encubierta contra Cuba : documentos desclasificados de la CIA (in Spanish). La Habana: Ed. Política. ISBN 959-01-0234-4.
- Diez Acosta, Tomás (2003). Confrontación Estados Unidos — Cuba (in Spanish). La Habana: Ed. Política. ISBN 959-01-0498-3.
- Diez Acosta, Tomás (2002). Octubre de 1962 : a un paso de holocausto; una mirada cubana a la crisis de los misiles (in Spanish). La Habana: Ed. Política. ISBN 959-01-0494-0.
