= Teresa Chipia =

Angolan politician

Teresa Chipia is an Angolan politician.

Chipia is a member of the National Assembly of Angola. Chipia was elected in 2017.

Chipia belongs to the National Union for the Total Independence of Angola.

Chipia was a provincial president of the Liga da Mulher Angolana (LIMA) ("Angolan Women's League") from 1992 to 1995.
