= Augusto Piccini =

Italian chemist

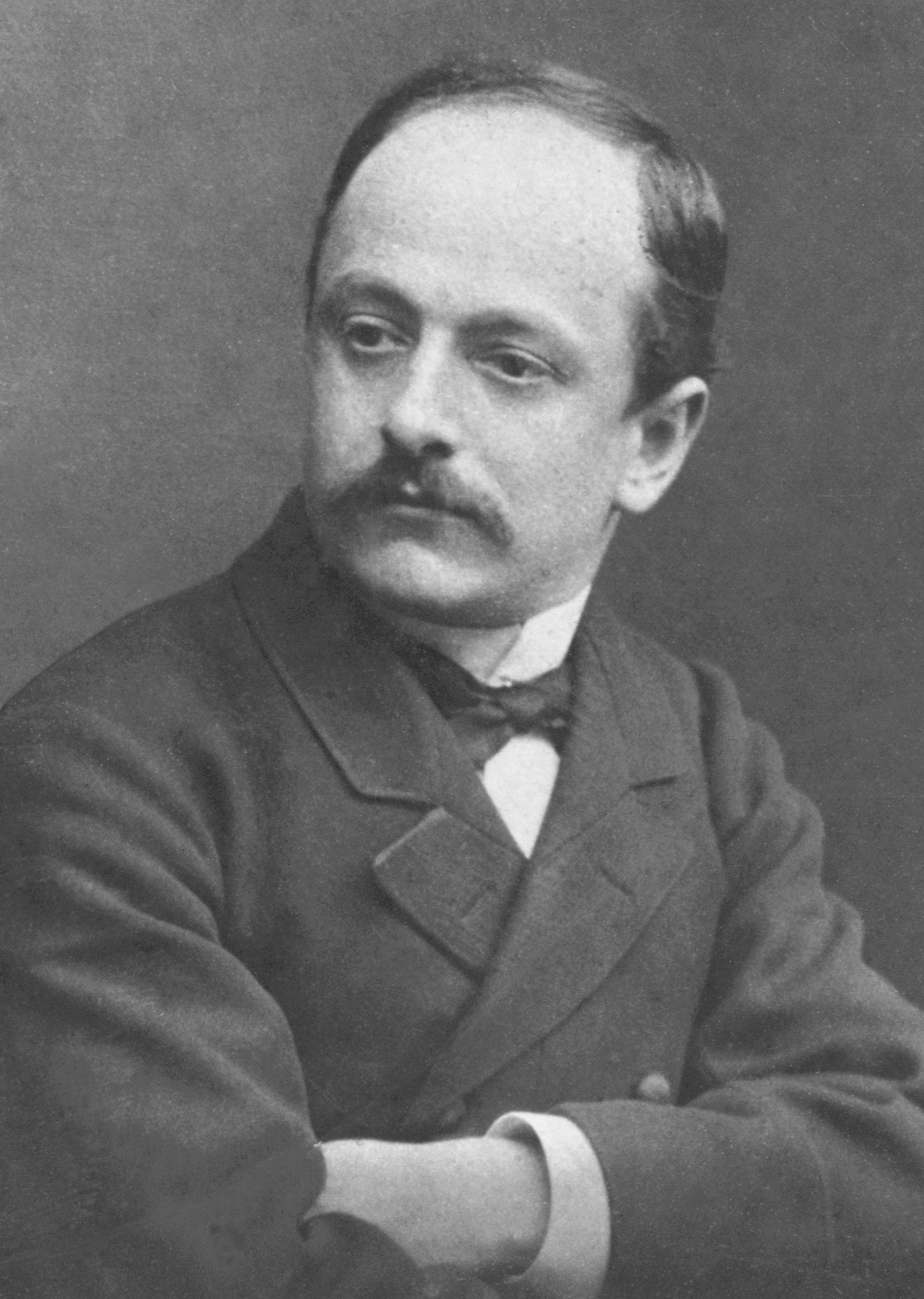
Augusto Piccini

Augusto Piccini (born May 8, 1854 in San Miniato, † April 15, 1905 in Florence) was an Italian chemist.

== Biography ==
He was born in 1854 as the son of the president of the local court Francesco Piccini and his wife Elisabetta Boninsegni. Piccini had two brothers, Giulio (1849-1915), journalist and author of crime stories, and Giovanni (1851-1903), lawyer and since 1900 Member of the Camera dei deputati of the Kingdom of Italy.

Piccini attended from 1872 a course in pharmacy at the Istituto di Studi Superiori di Firenze, and then he studied chemistry at the Royal University of Padua, which he completed in 1876. Stanislao Cannizzaro appointed him in 1880 at the age of 26 as an assistant to his chair of general chemistry in Rome, where he was a colleague of Giacomo Luigi Ciamician. In 1885 Piccini became professor of general chemistry at the University of Catania. Two years later, he taught at the School of Applied Engineering in Rome. Finally, in 1892, he moved to Florence, where he was appointed Professor of Pharmaceutical and Toxicological Chemistry at the Istituto di Studi Superiori di Firenze.

Piccini was an early proponent of Mendeleev's ideas, which contributed to the spreading of the periodic table in Italy.
