= Triston Jay Amero =

American murderer (1982–2008)

- Born: John Scheda; 13 September 1981; Placerville, California, U.S.
- Died: 1 April 2008 (aged 26); La Paz, Bolivia
- Other names: Claudio Lestad, Lestat Claudius de Orleans y Montevideo, John Scheda
- Motive: Unknown
- Penalty: 30 years' imprisonment without the possibility of parole

Details
- Date: 22 March 2006
- Killed: 2
- Injured: 7

Triston Jay Amero (13 September 1981 – 1 April 2008), also known as Lestat Claudius de Orleans y Montevideo, which he eventually changed to his legal name, was an American who was found guilty of the hotel bombings that killed two people and wounded seven others in La Paz, Bolivia, on March 22, 2006. The bombings damaged two low-rent hotels. A third bombing was stopped.

== Biography ==
Amero, who also went by the name John Scheda, was born in Placerville, California, as the son of a California woman and a Saudi Arabian man. He had reportedly been hospitalized for psychiatric treatment and had been in juvenile prison several times, beginning at age seven. He had wandered around Latin America for some years before settling in the Bolivian city of Potosí in 2004. In posts from Colombia to his blog, he repeatedly described himself as a loner, a "political refugee" and "the Superman of Loosers" [sic] whose strongest desire was to distance himself from the United States. He had previously been convicted of terrorism in Argentina and had sent a letter bomb to a judge in Uruguay in May 2005.

== Bombings ==
On 22 March 2006, Amero set off bombs at two independent hotels in Linares and Rioshino, two different locations in La Paz, the capital of Bolivia. He also plotted to place a bomb at the Consulate of Chile, but was arrested before this could happen.

Although the Bolivian police were unsure of the motive for the bombings that led to Amero's arrest, President Evo Morales declared: "This American was putting bombs in hotels ... The U.S. government fights terrorism, and they send us terrorists", he said. Morales denounced the bombings as an attack on Bolivia's democracy. He called it "typical of terrorist crime." This caused a brief cooling of U.S.-Bolivian relations. Police described him as a "psychopath" who aimed to kill upwards of 200 people.

Deputy Interior Minister Rafael Puente told Radio Fides: "The possible motives behind these attacks are incomprehensible. There don't seem to be any concrete objectives other than causing deaths."

== Aftermath ==
Amero, 24, and his Uruguayan girlfriend, Alda Ribeiro Costa, 45, who was pregnant at the time, were arrested by police in a hotel in the slum of El Alto. They were ordered held in "preventive detention" pending trial by Judge Williams Davila, who said he would evaluate Amero's request for a psychiatric evaluation as well as the pregnant Ribeiro's request for a medical exam. After being formally charged with murder, they were held in a maximum security prison near La Paz. While there, Amero attempted to stab his lawyer and had gasoline hidden in his cell, with plans to set fire to a prison official and a U.S. diplomat. Amero was sentenced to 30 years in prison without the possibility of parole on January 23, 2008. At the age of 26, Amero died in a hospital on April 1, 2008, after complaining of stomach pains while imprisoned at the San Pedro de Chonchocoro Penitentiary Center in La Paz.
