= Miguel Proença =

Brazilian pianist (1939–2025)

Miguel Angelo Oronoz Proença (March 27, 1939 – August 22, 2025) was a Brazilian pianist.

== Life and work ==
Proença was born in Quaraí on March 27, 1939. Throughout a career spanning more than six decades, he has performed as a soloist on five continents. His discography contains more than 30 recordings dedicated to Brazilian and international classical music.

Proença was a Steinway Artist, appearing on the Steinway & Sons Wall of Fame.

Proença died on August 22, 2025, at the age of 86.
