= Eva Blay =

Brazilian sociologist

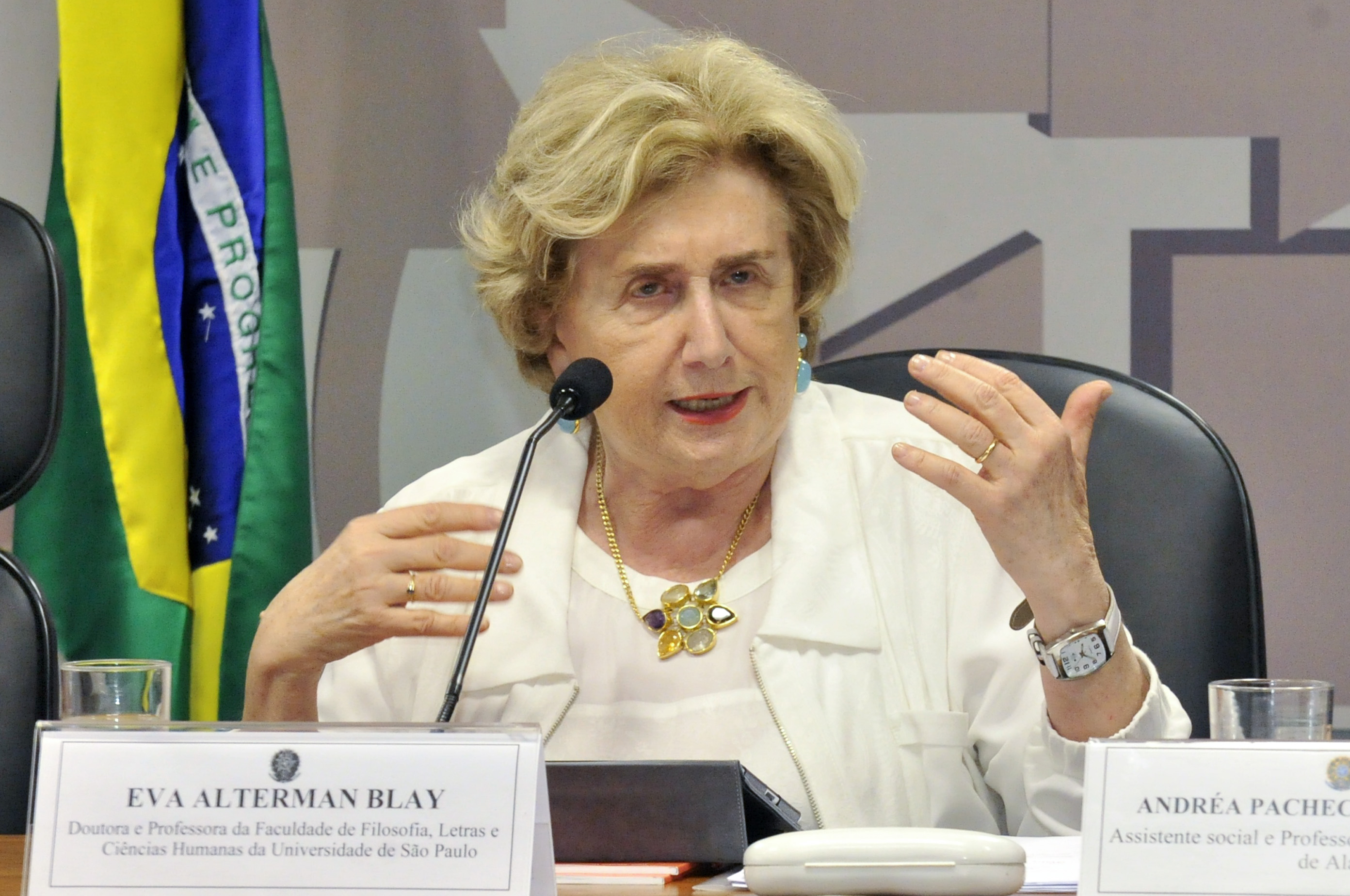

Senator for São Paulo
- In office 5 October 1992 – 1 February 1995
- Preceded by: Fernando Henrique Cardoso
- Succeeded by: José Serra

Personal details
- Born: Eva Alterman; 4 June 1937 (age 89) São Paulo, Brazil
- Party: PSDB

Eva Alterman Blay (born 4 June 1937) is a Brazilian sociologist.

She is a pioneer of women's rights in Brazil and is the founder of the Center for the Study of Women and Gender Rights at the University of São Paulo. She is active in politics as a member of the centrist Brazilian Social Democracy Party, and was the first woman to sit in the Brazilian Senate. She has Master's, Doctoral and Postdoctoral degrees in sociology. Blay sits on the board of the Remember the Women Institute In 1986, she was elected first alternate to Senator Fernando Henrique Cardoso, replacing him when the incumbent was successively Minister of Foreign Affairs (1992–1993) and Minister of Finance (1993–1994) in the Itamar Franco administration. Victorious in the 1994 election, the incumbent resigned to assume the President of Brazil, therefore making Blay senator for the state of São Paulo, completing the term that would end in January 1995. She never ran for elective office again.
