= Albertina de Oliveira Costa =

Brazilian sociologist and feminist

Albertina de Oliveira Costa is a Brazilian sociologist, editor, theoretician and feminist activist. A member of the Carlos Chagas Foundation, she is one of the principal investigators of issues related to women's studies in Brazil. Costa graduated with a degree in social sciences from the University of São Paulo. Her theoretical themes are in the field of gender studies but from a feminist perspective closer to activism, defending the rights of women, public policies and human rights. She is a member of the National Council for the Rights of Women and is editor of the journal Cadernos de Pesquisa. She has also collaborated in Revista Estudos Feministas and in Cadernos Pagu while sitting on the executive committee of the International Journal of Human Rights.

== Selected works ==
- Memórias das mulheres do exílio : obra coletiva (1980)
- Memorias Do Exilio (1980)
- É viável o feminismo nos trópicos? (1988)
- Rebeldia e submissão : estudos sobre condição feminina (with Maria Cristina A Bruschini and Fundação Carlos Chagas; 1989)
- O acesso das mulheres à cidadania : questões em aberto (1991)
- Gênero e universidade (with Eva Alterman Blay; 1992)
- Os Cadernos de Pesquisa e a consolidação dos estudos de gênero (with Cristina Bruschini; 1992)
- Uma Questão de gênero (with Maria Cristina A Bruschini; 1992)
- Entre a virtude e o pecado (with Maria Cristina A Bruschini; 1992)
- Alternativas escassas : saúde, sexualidade e reprodução na América Latina (with Tina Amado; 1994)
- Os Estudos da mulher no Brasil ou a estratégia da corda bamba (1994)
- Protagonistas ou coadjuvantes : Carlota e os estudos feministas (1996)
- Direitos tardios : saúde, sexualidade e reprodução na América Latina (1997)
- Uma história para contar : a pesquisa na Fundação Carlos Chagas (with Angela Maria Martins and Maria Laura Puglieri Barbosa Franco; 2004)
- Revista estudos feministas primeira fase, locação Rio de Janeiro (2004)
- Mercado de trabalho e gênero : comparações internacionais (with Adriana Fontes; 2008)
