= Sylvia Thereza =

Brazilian pianist

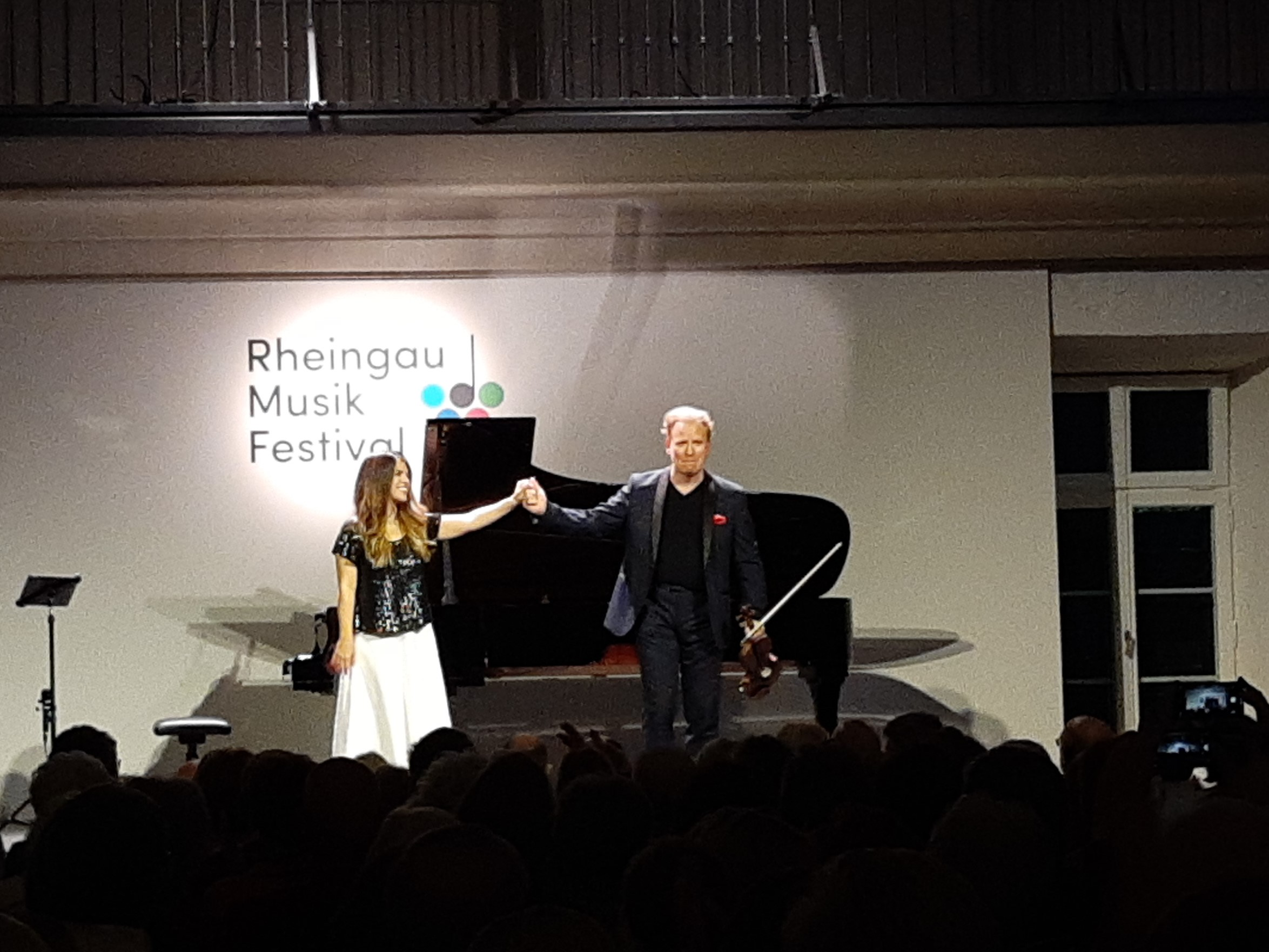
- Thereza and Daniel Hope in a Rheingau Musik Festival concert, 2023
- Born: Rio de Janeiro, Brazil
- Education: Free University of Berlin
- Occupations: Classical pianist; Academic teacher
- Organizations: LUCA School of Arts

Sylvia Thereza is a Brazilian classical pianist who made an international career, focused o chamber music. She has been a professor of piano at the LUCA School of Arts in Belgium.

== Life and career ==
Thereza was born on in Rio de Janeiro. She started playing piano at age three, improvising with her father, and played concerts from age six. She studied with Maria João Pires who became her mentor.

She studied further in Belgium, in a program for a master's degree with Alan Weiss at the Université catholique de Louvain (UCLouvain).

João Pires, who had introduced her to Europe, asked her to become assistant professor to her at Queen Elisabeth Music Chapel in Belgium, where she taught from 2012 to 2016. She has taught from 2021 as professor of piano at the LUCA School of Arts in Belgium.

== Recordings ==
Thereza recorded with violinist Daniel Hope a CD named America!, with music by composers related to the United States in different ways, such as Dvořák's Violin Sonatina, a Nocturne by Aaron Copland, Jake Heggie's Fantasy Suite 1803, a song from Erich Zeisl's unfinished opera, the theme by Miklós Rózsa from the 1959 film Ben-Hur, and songs by Gershwin. They toured with the program in Europe; a reviewer in Klagenfurt noted that she was more than an accompanist, and played an encore, Heitor Villa-Lobos's Dance of the White Indian with thundering chords.
