= Allan Acosta =

American engineer (1924–2020)

Allan James Acosta (August 10, 1924 – May 18, 2020) was an American engineer, and a Richard L. and Dorothy M. Hayman Professor of Mechanical Engineering, emeritus at California Institute of Technology. He was elected to the American Association for the Advancement of Science and National Academy of Engineering.
