= Theresa of Portugal =

Theresa of Portugal may refer to:

- Theresa, Countess of Portugal (1080–1130), mother of Afonso Henriques, the first King of Portugal
- Theresa of Portugal, Countess of Flanders (1157–1218), daughter of Afonso Henriques and wife of Philip, Count of Flanders
- Theresa of Portugal, Queen of León (1181–1250), daughter of Sancho I of Portugal and wife of Alfonso IX of León
- Infanta Maria Teresa of Braganza (1793–1874), firstborn child of John VI of Portugal
- Infanta Maria Theresa of Portugal (1855–1944), second daughter of Miguel I of Portugal
