= María Teresa de Acosta Toro =

Spanish founder of a banking house (1777–1851)

- Born: 2 July 1777; Granada, Spain
- Died: 20 May 1851 (aged 73); Granada, Spain
- Occupation: Banker
- Spouse: José María Rodríguez Sancho
- Children: 2

María Teresa de Acosta Toro y González (2 July 1777– 20 May 1851), often known as Teresa Acosta, was the Spanish founder of a large banking house in Granada, as well as a "dynasty of bankers" who would lead the firm for more than a century.

== Early life ==
Teresa was born in Granada on 2 July 1777 to Miguel de Acosta and María Josefa Toro. In 1808 she married José María Rodríguez Sancho and they had two children, José María and Micaela. Among her descendants is the painter José María Rodríguez-Acosta.

== Career ==
When her husband died in December 1824, Acosta inherited approximately 200,000 reales, which she used to establish a banking house in Granada. The firm was named Viuda de Rodríguez (Widow of Rodríguez) and is believed to have begun operations around 1831 as a house of commissions, drafts and transfers to facilitate commerce. It is possible that she had acquired a banking business that had operated under the name José Siqués and José Vergés, Commission Agents. The available information on the banking house's activity dates from 1840–1842 and is included in a ledger titled "Number 6," but five earlier ledgers are known to have existed. This suggests that banking activity had begun at least a decade before that.

The bank was considered "the most reliable in the region," with an extensive network of banking connections that ensured the success of its transactions. It was a commission house, offering money orders and transfers to serve as a means of payment for trade between cities. The bank operated on commission, charging percentages already deducted from the money to be transferred to or from the cash on hand.

Between 1840 and 1842, 2,034 transfers were made, 81% of which were within Andalusia, Spain. Between September 1844 and July 1847, the Viuda de Rodríguez bank became the depository for the University of Granada when Felipe Valverde and his employer, Acosta's bank, became the University Trustee by Royal Decree.

After Acosta died in 1851, inventories showed that she had doubled her initial fortune, from an inheritance of 200,000 reales to more than 426,000 reales.

== Legacy ==
Her eldest son inherited the bank and later managed it under his own name, José María Rodríguez Acosta. Over time, it became known as the Rodríguez-Acosta Bank, which operated until 1946 when it was absorbed by a larger financial institution, Granada's Central Bank.
