= Teresa Piccini =

Mexican ten-pin bowler

Medal record

Women's bowling

Representing Mexico

World Senior Championships
Silver medal – second place	2013 Las Vegas	Doubles

Teresa Piccini is a Mexican ten-pin bowler. She finished in 15th position of the combined rankings at the 2006 AMF World Cup.
