= Teresa (disambiguation) =

Teresa is a common feminine name.

Teresa, Theresa, Therese, or Thérèse may also refer to:

== People ==
- One of several saints named Teresa

== Places ==
- Teresa, Rizal, a municipality in the Philippine province of Rizal
- Theresa, New York, a town in the United States
  - Theresa (village), New York, a village within the town
- Theresa (town), Wisconsin, a town in the United States
  - Theresa, Wisconsin, a village within the town
- Teresa, Castellón, a municipality in Spain
- Teresa, Greater Poland Voivodeship, west-central Poland
- Teressa Island, one of the Nicobar Islands in Andaman and Nicobar Islands, India
- Thérèse Island, in the Seychelles

== Film and television ==
- Teresa (1951 film), an American film directed by Fred Zinnemann
- Thérèse (film), a 1986 French film by Alain Cavalier about the life of Saint Thérèse of Lisieux
- Teresa (1987 film), an Italian film directed by Dino Risi
- Teresa (2010 film), an Equatoguinean film directed by Thato Rantao Mwosa
- Thérèse Desqueyroux (2012 film), a 2012 film by Claude Miller, also known as Thérèse
- Therese (2013 film), an American erotic thriller based on the Zola novel Thérèse Raquin
- Teresa (2015 film), a television film directed by Jorge Dorado
- Teresa (2023 film), a Spanish film directed by Paula Ortiz
- Teresa (1959 TV series), a Mexican soap opera on Telesistema Mexicano, starring Maricruz Olivier as Teresa Martínez
- Teresa (1989 TV series), a Mexican soap opera on El Canal de las Estrellas, starring Salma Hayek as Teresa Martínez
- Teresa (2010 TV series), a Mexican soap opera from 2010 to 2011 on Televisa in Mexico and Univision in the U.S., starring Angelique Boyer as Teresa Chávez Aguirre

== Music ==
- Thérésa (singer) (1837–1913), French singer
- Thérèse (opera), a 1907 opera by Jules Massenet
- Thérèse – Vivre d'amour, a 2013 concept album of poems by St. Thérèse of Lisieux, with music composed by French musician Grégoire
- "Teresa" (song), a song by Joe Dolan that topped the Irish singles chart in 1969
- "Teresa", a song by Dick Haymes and The Andrews Sisters
- "Teresa", a song by Eddie Cochran from The Very Best of Eddie Cochran

== Novels ==
- Teresa (novel), an 1896 novel by Neera
- Theresa (novel), a 1928 novel by Arthur Schnitzler
- Teresa: A Journey Out of Time, a 1961 novel by Frank Baker

== Other uses ==
- Teresa (magazine), a Spanish women's magazine published during the Franco rule
- USS Teresa (ID-4478), a United States Navy cargo ship in commission from 1918 to 1919
- Teresa (Barbie), a fashion doll who is a fictional friend to Barbie

== See also ==
- Teressa (disambiguation)
- Therese (disambiguation)
- Therese's shrew (Crocidura theresae), species of mammal in the family Soricidae
- Lac-Sainte-Thérèse, Ontario
- Sainte-Thérèse, Quebec
- Val Thérèse, Ontario
- Terezín, a place in the Czech Republic
- Mother Teresa (disambiguation)
- Saint Teresa (disambiguation)
- Santa Teresa (disambiguation)
