= Thérèse Desqueyroux =

Thérèse Desqueyroux may refer to:

- Thérèse Desqueyroux (novel), 1927 French novel by François Mauriac
- Thérèse Desqueyroux (1962 film), French adaptation of Mauriac's novel
- Thérèse Desqueyroux (2012 film), French adaptation of Mauriac's novel

== See also ==
- Therese (disambiguation)
