= Thérèse Desqueyroux (1962 film) =

1962 French film

- French film poster
- Directed by: Georges Franju
- Written by: Claude Mauriac; Georges Franju; François Mauriac
- Based on: Thérèse Desqueyroux; by François Mauriac
- Produced by: Robert Vignon
- Starring: Emmanuelle Riva; Philippe Noiret
- Cinematography: Christian Matras
- Edited by: Gilbert Natot
- Music by: Maurice Jarre
- Production company: Filmel
- Distributed by: 20th Century Fox (France)
- Release date: 21 September 1962 (France)
- Running time: 109 minutes
- Country: France
- Language: French

Thérèse Desqueyroux is a 1962 French drama film directed by Georges Franju, based on the 1927 novel of the same name by François Mauriac. Written by Franju, François Mauriac and Claude Mauriac, it stars Emmanuelle Riva and Philippe Noiret.

== Plot ==
Thérèse Desqueyroux lives in a mansion in Argelouse in the Landes, a region in Southwestern France, unhappily married to Bernard, a dull and pompous landowner whose only interest is preserving his family name and property. Her only comforts are her fondness for the surrounding pine forests and her friendship with Bernard's half-sister Anne. When Anne falls in love with Jean Azevedo, a young man from the neighbourhood, her parents ask Thérèse to intervene, as he is not acceptable as a future son-in-law because of his Jewish ancestry. As a result, Anne distances herself from Thérèse.

The birth of her daughter increases Thérèse's alienation. Her mind turns to the medication on which Bernard is dependent. By secretly increasing the dosage she precipitates a crisis, but it does not prove fatal. After enquiries reveal that she had been forging prescriptions, she is arrested. Desperate to save the family reputation, her influential father applies pressure and Bernard perjures himself. Acquitted, she undertakes the lonely journey back to Bernard's estate. Bernard has her locked in a room where she is looked after by the housekeepers while he is away on business travels.

Allowed only cigarettes and wine but no books, Thérèse slowly fades away. When freed to attend a family gathering and meet Anne's new husband, people are dismayed at her sickly appearance. The concerned Bernard agrees to let her live freely in Paris with an allowance, on condition that she returns for family events as his spouse. Asked by Bernard for her motives for the poisoning, she is unable to give him any satisfactory explanation.

== Cast ==
- Emmanuelle Riva as Thérèse Desqueyroux
- Philippe Noiret as Bernard Desqueyroux
- Édith Scob as Anne de la Trave
- Sami Frey as Jean Azevedo
- Renée Devillers as Madame de la Trave
- Richard Saint-Bris as Hector de la Trave
- Jeanne Pérez as Balionte
- Hélène Dieudonné as Aunt Clara
- Jean-Jacques Rémy as Specialist
- Lucien Nat as Monsieur Larroque, Thérèse's father
- Jacques Monod as Maître Duros

== Production ==
The film, which moved the novel's temporal setting from the 1920s to the 1960s but maintained the locale of Southwestern France, was shot at Franstudio, Paris Studio Cinéma, and in the communes of Bazas, Villandraut, and Uzeste. Franju's adaptation kept mostly close to the literary source, with the exception of omitting any of the novel's references to Catholicism or guilt on Thérèse's side, as Franju supported his protagonist's struggle for freedom. For the same reason, he rejected the possibility of a sequel to the story, other than Mauriac who had Thérèse punished in his 1935 novel La fin de la nuit.

== Release ==
Thérèse Desqueyroux represented France at the 1962 Venice Film Festival, where it was screened on 4 September, and was released in French cinemas on 21 September the same year. The reaction of the French press, including the Cahiers du Cinéma, was almost unanimously positive. Only M. Ranchal of Positif expressed his dislike for the film as it did not fulfil his expectations of a Franju film.

== Awards ==
- Best Actress Award for Emmanuelle Riva at the 1962 Venice Film Festival

== Soundtrack ==
In February 2005, the French soundtrack record label Play Time released Maurice Jarre's film music on Compact Disc, along with other scores which Jarre had composed for films by Franju.

== See also ==
- Thérèse Desqueyroux (2012 film)
