= Culture of Equatorial Guinea =

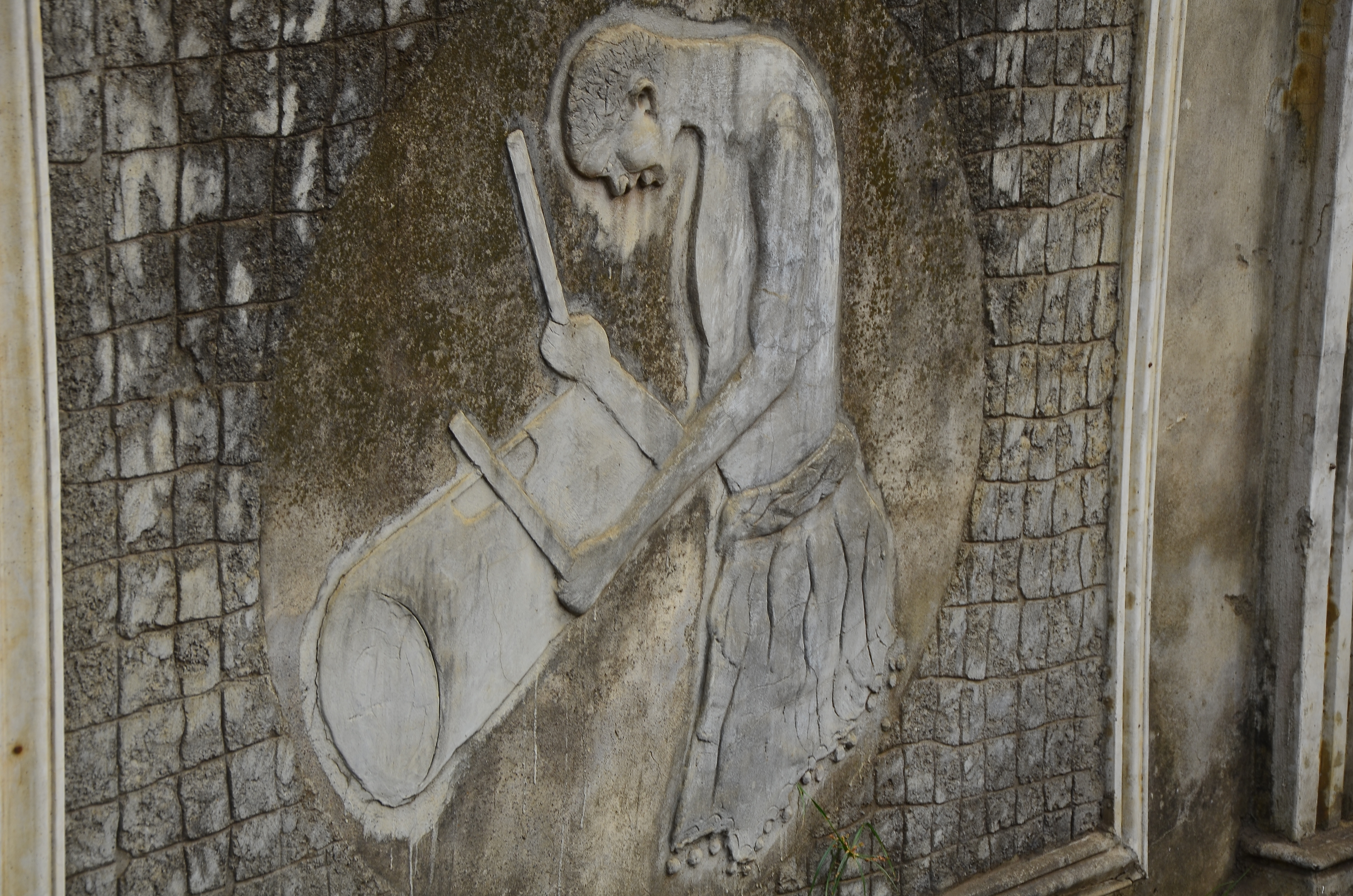
A stone carving in Malabo

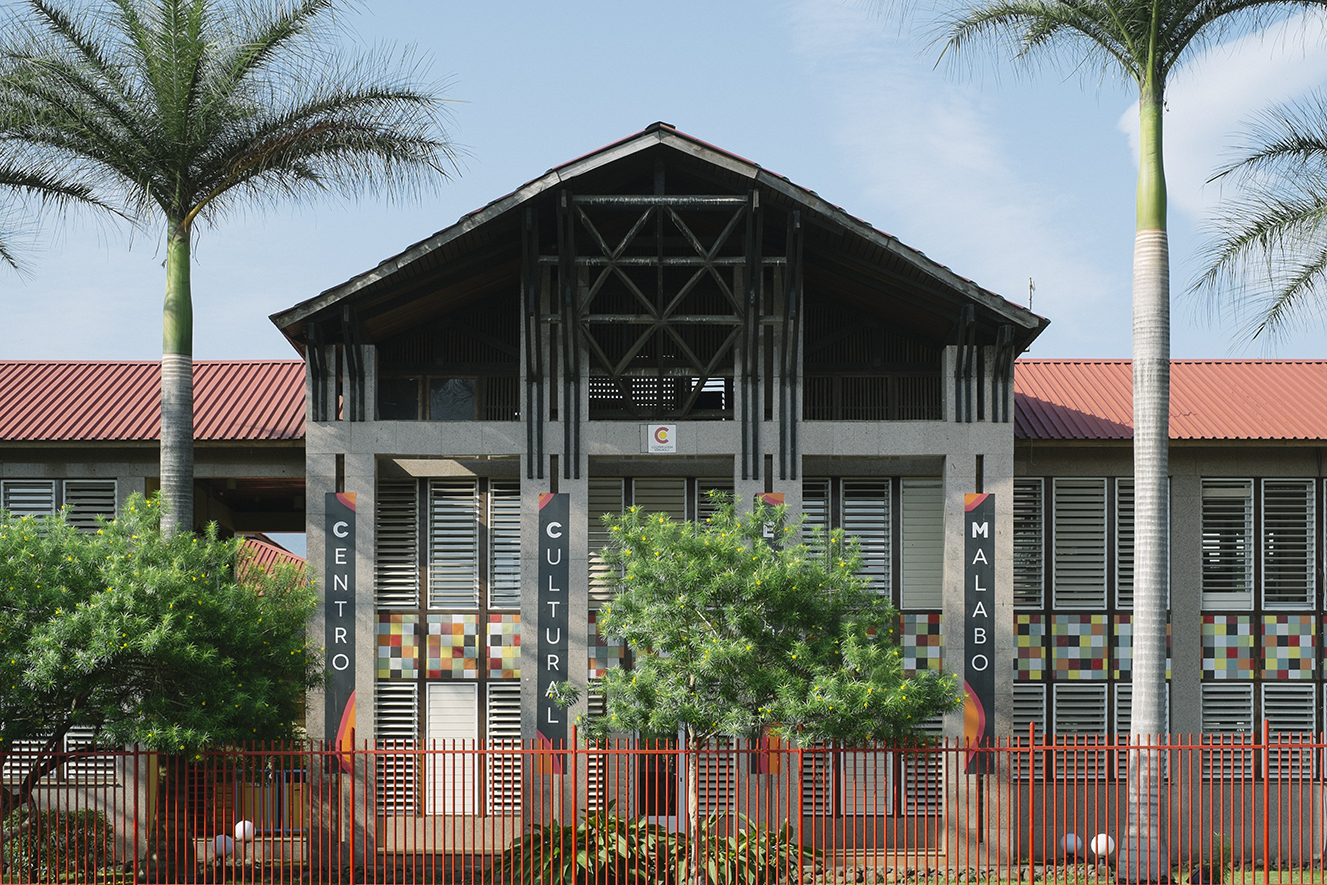
Centro Cultural de España (Cultural Center of Spain) in Malabo.

Lying on the culturally rich continent of Africa, Equatorial Guinea has proved to be entrenched in ancient rituals and songs. This is especially true for the Fang, a people whose territories begin at the southern edge of Cameroon south of Kribi, Djoum, and Mvangan in the South Province and continue south across the border, including all of Río Muni in Equatorial Guinea, and from there south into Gabon and Congo. The island of Bioko has largely been influenced by Spanish customs and traditions during the colonial period, when education and health services were developed in the country. As of January 2nd, 2026, the capital of Equatorial Guinea is now the Ciudad de la Paz.

== Traditions ==
Many Bubi farmers still hold to their ancient customs. One of the country's most famous celebrations is the abira, which is believed to cleanse the community of evil. The balélé dance is performed along the coast throughout the year and on Bioko around Christmas.

== Religion, race, and language ==
Most people in the country are nominally Christian, but practice a combination of Roman Catholicism and traditional pagan customs. In April 2026, Pope Leo XIV visited Equatorial Guinea.

Spanish, French, and Portuguese are the official languages of the country.

Despite a veneer of Spanish culture and of Roman Catholic religion that is thicker in Bioko than on the mainland, Equatorial Guineans live largely according to ancient customs, which have undergone a revival since independence. Among the Fang of the mainland, witchcraft, traditional music (in which the Fang harp, the xylophone, the great drums, and the wooden trumpet are used), and storytelling survive. Spanish aid is much oriented to educational and health services. Among the Bubi farmers of Bioko, some ancient customs are still followed.

== Music ==
The Fang is known for the mvet, an instrument that looks like a cross between a zither and a harp, and can have up to fifteen strings. The semi-spherical part of this instrument is made of bamboo, and the strings are attached to the center by fibers. Music for the mvet is written in the form of musical notation that can only be learned by the initiates of the bebom-mvet society. Music is typically call and response with a chorus and drums alternating.

== Cinema ==
Juan Pablo Ebang Esono is one of the top filmmakers in the country. In 2010, Esono directed Teresa, the first medium-length film to be produced in Equatorial Guinea.

== See also ==
- Raquel Ilombé: Poetry and writings
