= Therese (disambiguation) =

Therese is a female given name.

Therese or variation, may also refer to:

== Places ==
- Thérèse Island, Seychelles; an island
- Val Thérèse, Ontario, Canada

== Other people ==
- Saints named Therese
- Allah Thérèse (died 2020) Ivorian singer
- Fabianne Therese, U.S. actress
- Louise Marie Thérèse (The Black Nun of Moret) (1658-1730)
- Madame Therese (1706-1729) Dutch madam Amsterdam brothelkeep

== Fiction ==
- Thérèse (film), French 1986 film about Ste.Therese of Liseux
- Therese (2013 film), U.S. film
- Thérèse (opera), an opera by Jules Massenet
- Thérèse the Philosopher (novel) 1748 French novel
- Madame Thérèse (novel)
- Therese (novel), 1928 novel

== Other uses ==
- Saint Therese (disambiguation)
- Marie Thérèse (disambiguation)
- Thérèse – Vivre d'amour (album) 2013 album

== See also ==
- Teréz Brunszvik (1775–1861), member of the Hungarian nobility, pedagogue
- Thérèse-De Blainville (federal electoral district), Quebec, Canada
- Thérèse-De Blainville Regional County Municipality, Quebec, Canada
- Therese and Isabelle (1968 film)
- Therese Raquin (disambiguation)
- Thérèse Desqueyroux (disambiguation)
- Teressa (disambiguation)
- Teresa (disambiguation)
- Tess (disambiguation)
