= Guillermina Mekuy =

Equatoguinean writer (born 1982)

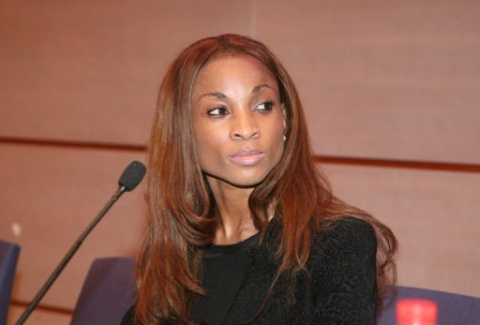
- Mekuy in 2013
- Born: Guillermina Mekuy Mba Obono; 25 June 1982 (age 43); Evinayong, Equatorial Guinea
- Other names: "The Dior Minister"
- Partner: Ignacio Palomo

Guillermina Mekuy Mba Obono (born 25 June 1982) is an Equatoguinean writer and politician who became a minister.

== Life ==
Mekuy was born in 1982 in Evinayong and she spent six years in that country before she went to live in Madrid with her family as her father, who was a Guinean diplomat, had been given an assignment to Spain.

Her first novel, El Llanto de la Perra, was published when she was seventeen. She graduated from the Autonomous University of Madrid in Law and Political Science. In 2008, her second novel, Las Tres Vírgenes de Santo Tomás was published. This erotic novel attracted some critical evaluation. The novel includes the subject of polygamy which Mekuy is opposed to - she says that she expects loyalty from her partner.

When she was 25 she accepted the position of head of her country's museums and libraries that was offered by the long serving President of Equatorial Guinea, Teodoro Obiang Nguema Mbasogo. In 2009 her country's national library, Biblioteca Nacional de Guinea Ecuatorial, opened and Mekuy was its first director. In 2010 the 34-minute film Teresa was released. It is a film about three teenagers and Mekuy wrote the script. It was directed by Juan Pablo Ebang Esono.

In 2011 she published Tres Almas Para Un Corazón (Three Souls for the Heart).

In 2013 Equatorial Guinea announced a new kind of government separated into two houses. Mekuy was announced as one of the 100 senators in the upper house. She was announced as a minister of culture in 2016. She was known for dressing in designer outfits and she was nicknamed "The Dior Minister".
