= 1952 Nobel Prize in Literature =

The 1952 Nobel Prize in Literature
- François Mauriac
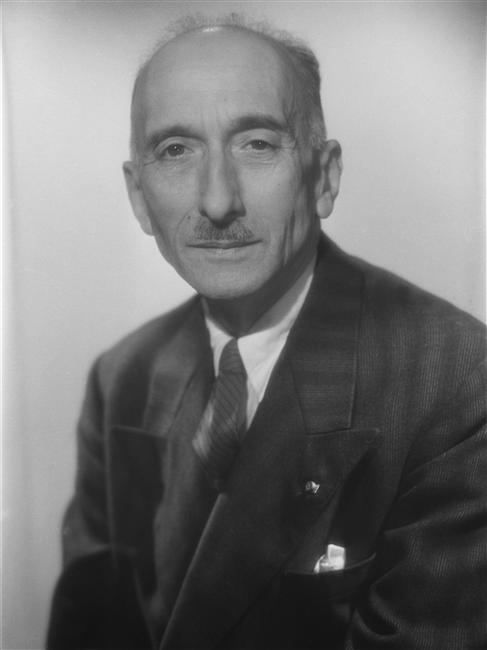
- "for the deep spiritual insight and the artistic intensity with which he has in his novels penetrated the drama of human life."
- Date: 6 November 1952 (announcement); 10 December 1952 (ceremony)
- Location: Stockholm, Sweden
- Presented by: Swedish Academy
- First award: 1901
- Website: Official website

The 1952 Nobel Prize in Literature was awarded to the French Catholic writer François Mauriac (1885–1970) "for the deep spiritual insight and the artistic intensity with which he has in his novels penetrated the drama of human life." He is the eighth French author to receive the prize after the novelist André Gide in 1947.

== Laureate ==
François Mauriac made his breakthrough with the poetry book Les Mains jointes ("Clasped Hands", 1909), but went on to become as a dramatist and novelist. His works are frequently set in and around Bordeaux, France, and investigate human nature through the lens of Catholicism. The characters struggle with money, self-righteousness, and guilt. As a result, Mauriac has been portrayed as a misanthrope at times, but he replied to this criticism by stating that the repeated messages in his writings about divine mercy and compassion were designed to inspire hope and confidence. His most well-known works include La Chair et le Sang ("Flesh and Blood", 1920), Le Désert de l'amour ("The Desert of Love", 1925), Thérèse Desqueyroux (1927), Le Nœud de vipères ("Vipers' Tangle", 1932).

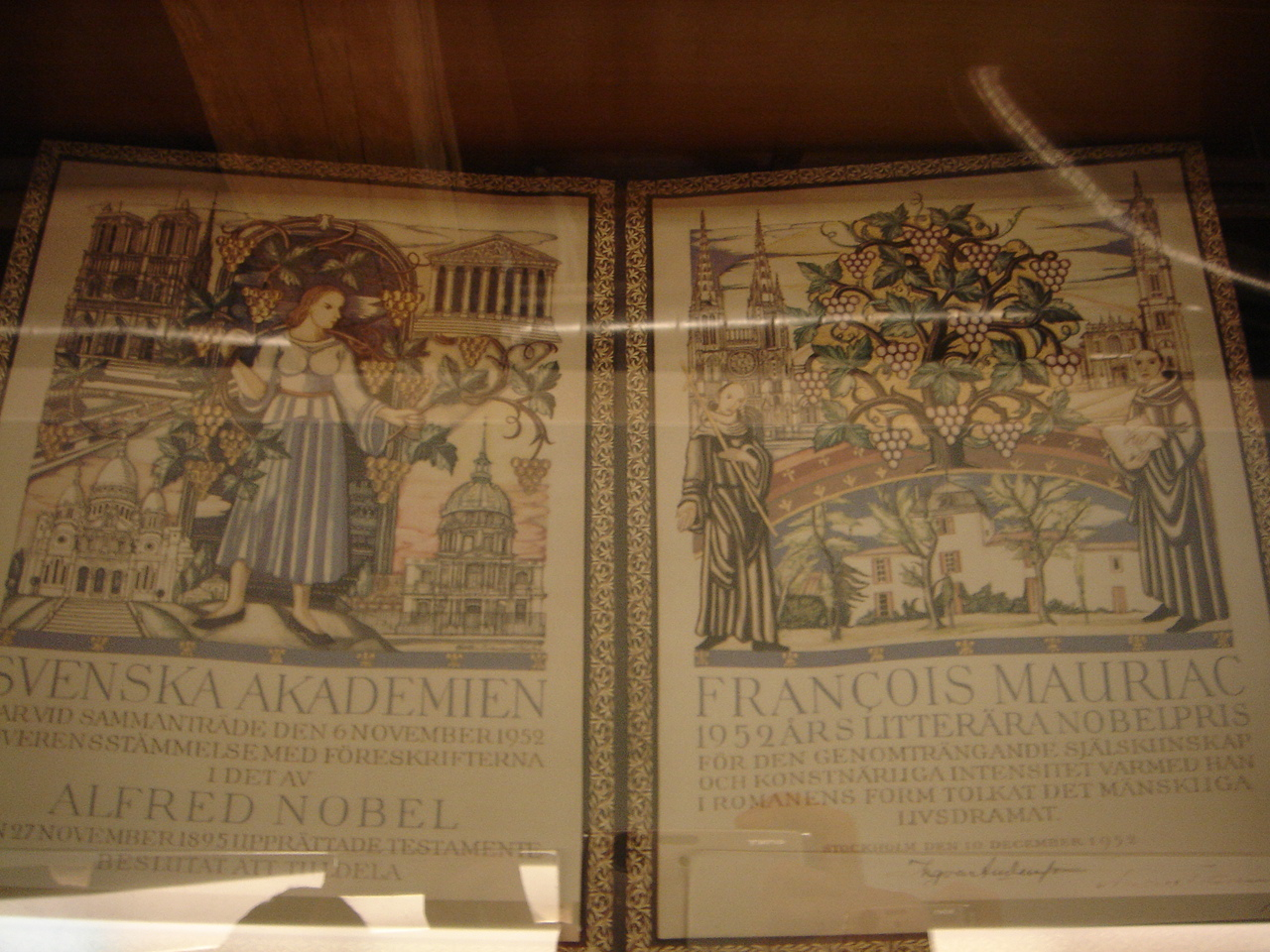
The Nobel diploma awarded to François Mauriac.

== Deliberations ==
=== Nominations ===
In total, the Swedish Academy's Nobel Committee received 57 nominations for 40 writers. Fourteen of the nominees were newly nominated such as Paul Vialar, Juan Ramón Jiménez (awarded in 1956), Walter de la Mare, Julien Benda, Salvador de Madariaga, Albert Schweitzer (awarded the 1952 Nobel Peace Prize), Werner Bergengruen, and Van Wyck Brooks. Only one female author was nominate: Spanish author Concha Espina de la Serna. The English actor and filmmaker Charlie Chaplin was purportedly nominated in 1952, but is not included in the archives.

The authors August Alle, Mariano Azuela, Ioan Alecu Bassarabescu, Margaret Wise Brown, Paul Bujor, Romain Coolus, Annie Sophie Cory, Norman Douglas, Paul Éluard, Jeffery Farnol, Gilbert Frankau, Cicely Hamilton, Aaro Hellaakoski, Masao Kume, Nadezhda Alexandrovna Lokhvitskaya (known as Teffi), Harold John Massingham, Charles Maurras, Ferenc Molnár, Maria Montessori, Pedro Prado, Josephine Tey, Lodewijk van Deyssel, Louis Verneuil, Clara Viebig, and Roger Vitrac died in 1952 without having been nominated for the prize. The Belgian writer Charles Plisnier died months before the announcement.

Official list of nominees and their nominators for the prize
No.	Nominee	Country	Genre(s)	Nominator(s)
1	Mark Aldanov (1886–1957)	Soviet Union (Ukraine); France	biography, novel, essays, literary criticism	Ivan Bunin (1870–1953)
2	Louis Artus (1870–1960)	France	drama, novel, literary criticism, essays	André Maurois (1885–1967); Louis Madelin (1871–1956)
3	Julien Benda (1867–1956)	France	novel, philosophy, essays, literary criticism	Hans Peter Sørensen (1886–1962)
4	Werner Bergengruen (1892–1964)	West Germany	novel, short story, poetry	Hans Neumann (1903–1990)
5	Jacobus Cornelis Bloem (1887–1966)	Netherlands	poetry, essays	The Dutch PEN-Club
6	Van Wyck Brooks (1886–1963)	United States	literary criticism, biography, history, essays	Paul Manship (1885–1966); Pearl Buck (1892–1973)
7	Albert Camus (1913–1960)	France (Algeria)	novel, short story, essays, philosophy, drama	Hjalmar Gullberg (1898–1961)
8	Hans Carossa (1878–1956)	West Germany	poetry, autobiography, essays	Hans Heinrich Borcherdt (1887–1964)
9	Winston Churchill (1874–1965)	United Kingdom	history, essays, memoir	Asta Kihlbom (1892–1984); Birger Nerman (1888–1971); Gustaf Hellström (1882–1953)
10	Benedetto Croce (1866–1952)	Italy	history, philosophy, law	Accademia dei Lincei; Harry Martinson (1904–1978)
11	Walter de la Mare (1873–1956)	United Kingdom	novel, short story, poetry, literary criticism, essays	Harry Martinson (1904–1978)
12	Salvador de Madariaga (1886–1978)	Spain	essays, history, law, novel	Sigurd Erixon (1888–1968)
13	Concha Espina de la Serna (1869–1955)	Spain	novel, short story	Real Academia de Bellas Artes de San Fernando; José María Pemán (1897–1981); Gerardo Diego (1896–1987); Jacinto Benavente (1866–1954)
14	José Maria Ferreira de Castro (1898–1978)	Portugal	novel	João de Barros (1881–1960)
15	Edward Morgan Forster (1879–1970)	United Kingdom	novel, short story, drama, essays, biography, literary criticism	The English PEN-Club
16	Robert Frost (1874–1963)	United States	poetry, drama	Edwin Harrison Cady (1917–2003)
17	Manuel Gálvez (1882–1962)	Argentina	novel, poetry, drama, essays, history, biography	Sociedad Argentina de Escritores
18	Jean Giono (1895–1970)	France	novel, short story, essays, poetry, drama	Société des gens de lettres
19	Enrique González Martínez (1871–1952)	Mexico	poetry	Academia Mexicana de la Lengua
20	Graham Greene (1904–1991)	United Kingdom	novel, short story, autobiography, essays	Hjalmar Gullberg (1898–1961)
21	Taha Hussein (1889–1973)	Egypt	novel, short story, poetry, translation	Karl Vilhelm Zetterstéen (1866–1953)
22	Juan Ramón Jiménez (1881–1958)	Spain	poetry, novel	Maurice Bowra (1898–1971)
23	Nikos Kazantzakis (1883–1957)	Greece	novel, philosophy, essays, drama, memoir, translation	Norwegian Authors' Union
24	Halldór Laxness (1902–1998)	Iceland	novel, short story, drama, poetry	Einar Sveinsson (1906–1973); Jón Helgason (1899–1986); Sigurður Nordal (1886–1974)
25	André Malraux (1901–1976)	France	novel, essays, literary criticism	Jean-Marie Carré (1887–1958)
26	François Mauriac (1885–1970)	France	novel, short story	Oscar Wieselgren (1886–1971); Prince Wilhelm, Duke of Södermanland (1884–1965)
27	Ramón Menéndez Pidal (1869–1968)	Spain	philology, history	100 institutions and individuals; Academia Argentina de Letras; Academia Chilena de la Lengua; Royal Spanish Academy
28	Charles Plisnier (1896–1952)	Belgium	novel, short story, poetry, essays	Association des Écrivains Belges; Académie royale de langue et de littérature françaises de Belgique
29	Sarvepalli Radhakrishnan (1888–1975)	India	philosophy, essays, law	The Indian PEN-Club
30	Henriette Roland Holst (1869–1952)	Netherlands	poetry, essays, biography	The Dutch PEN-Club
31	Jules Romains (1885–1972)	France	poetry, drama, screenplay	Maurice Gravier (1912–1992); Alfred Jolivet (1885–1966)
32	Carl Sandburg (1878–1967)	United States	poetry, essays, biography	Axel Boëthius (1889–1969)
33	Jean Schlumberger (1877–1968)	France	poetry, essays	International Centre of the PEN Club
34	Albert Schweitzer (1875–1965)	France (born in Germany)	philosophy, theology, essays	Nils Ahnlund (1889–1957)
35	Zalman Shneour (1887–1959)	Belarus; United States	poetry, essays	Naftali Herz Tur-Sinai (1886–1973); Joseph Klausner (1874–1958)
36	Tarjei Vesaas (1897–1970)	Norway	poetry, novel	Olav Midttun (1883–1972)
37	Simon Vestdijk (1898–1971)	Netherlands	novel, poetry, essays, translation	The Dutch PEN-Club
38	Paul Vialar (1898–1996)	France	novel, short story, essays, drama	Société des gens de lettres
39	Mika Waltari (1908–1979)	Finland	short story, novel, poetry, drama, essays, screenplay	Aarne Anttila (1892–1952)
40	John Dover Wilson (1881–1969)	United Kingdom	essays, literary criticism	Charles Jasper Sisson (1885–1966)

== Reactions ==
The choice of Mauriac was well received: "the choice of the Royal Swedish Academy will be generally applauded", Émile Henriot of the Académie française stated in Le Monde. "The writer who is today the object of this consecration, which is equivalent to access to a sort of international and ideal Academy, is worthy of this flattering and appreciable distinction. It comes to reward a very fine literary talent, recognized among us even by those who do not agree on all points with the beliefs, the choices, the enmities of Mr. François Mauriac; and similarly recognized as representative and universally valid beyond our borders."

== Award ceremony speech ==
At the award ceremony in Stockholm on 10 December 1952, Anders Österling, permanent secretary of the Swedish Academy, praised the artistic qualities of Mauriac's work and said:

for everywhere, in the whole series of Mauriac’s novels, are found unforgettable scenes, dialogues, and situations, so mysteriously and so cruelly revealing. The repetition of the same themes could create a certain monotony, but his acute analyses and sure touch awaken the same admiration with each new encounter. Mauriac remains unequalled in conciseness and expressive force of language; his prose can in a few suggestive lines shed light on the most complex and difficult things. His most remarkable works are characterized by a purity of logic and classic economy of expression that recall the tragedies of Racine. (...) Faithful to the truth which he has made his, he strives to describe his characters in such a way that, seeing themselves as they are, they would be stricken with repentance and the desire to become, if not better, at least a little less evil. His novels can be compared to narrow but deep wells at the bottom of which a mysterious water is seen glistening in the darkness.
