= Pierre Mauriac =

French dean of Bordeaux faculty of medicine and brother of François Mauriac (1882–1963)

- Born: November 21, 1882; Bordeaux
- Died: November 1, 1963; Bordeaux
- Citizenship: French
- Occupations: Professor of Medicine and Dean of the Faculty of Medicine and Pharmacy of Bordeaux
- Relatives: François Mauriac Nobel Prize in Literature

Academic background
- Education: Faculty of Medicine of Bordeaux

Academic work
- Discipline: Internal medicine
- Sub-discipline: Diabetes
- Institutions: University of Bordeaux
- Notable ideas: Royalist member of Action Française and active support of Philippe Petain and Vichy France

Pierre Mauriac was a French medical doctor and professor at the Faculty of Medicine and Pharmacy in Bordeaux, born on 21 November 1882 and died on 1 November 1963 in Bordeaux (Gironde). He served as dean of the medical school from 1934 to 1944. He was the brother of the writer François Mauriac, who won the Nobel Prize in Literature in 1952. He was a member of the royalist political movement Action Française and actively backed Philippe Pétain and the Vichy regime during the German occupation. He was appointed chairman of the Gironde departmental council of the order of physicians by the Vichy government in 1940. Following the Liberation of France, his trial for collaboration was dismissed. He was suspended from his post as dean in 1944, then dismissed in 1946 for Pétainist propaganda and for his role in the execution of the resistant Dr Charles Nancel-Pénard. This sanction was overturned in 1949 by the French Council of State.

== Biography ==
=== Family origins and private life ===
Leonard-Pierre Mauriac, known better as Pierre Mauriac, was born on 21 November 1882 in Bordeaux (Gironde). He was the son of Jean-Paul Mauriac (1850–1887), a landowner, and Claire Coiffard (1856–1929). He was the fourth of five children, the youngest being the writer François Mauriac (1885–1970) who won the Nobel Prize for Literature in 1952, to whom he was very close.

On his father's side, he came from a family of landowners who owned several estates (Domaine de Malagar, Château de Langon), vineyards and pine forests. His mother was from a family of wealthy Bordeaux merchants, his grandfather owned a business selling fabrics and shawls from India, and his grandmother was the heiress to a refinery. His father was a secularist and a republican, whilst his mother was a devout Catholic.

He was five years old when his father died from a brain abscess. His paternal uncle, Louis Mauriac, a magistrate, was then appointed guardian of the children's estate. The family lived in Bordeaux in their maternal grandmother's house in Rue Duffour-Dubergier until 1894, before moving into their own home, first in Rue Vital-Carles, then to Rue Margaux, and finally to 15 Rue Rolland in a house purchased by his mother, where Pierre and François shared a room. Pierre Mauriac married Emilie Latrille (1886–1955) on 21 July 1909 in Bordeaux, and they had seven children between 1910 and 1924.

=== Education ===
Pierre Mauriac went to school in religious institutions, first with the Marianist Brothers in Bordeaux, then at the Lycée Grand-Lebrun in Caudéran near Bordeaux. In 1900, he obtained his baccalaureate in both Literature and Philosophy, and Literature and Mathematics. His brother François described him as "a serious and studious lad, to be sure! and one who had won every prize in his class, without exception, to the point that on the day of the formal prize-giving ceremony, the three brothers were laden with books and wreaths, but it was only Pierre who had earned them". His mother described him as a child who was "stubborn and proud as a mule".

Pierre Mauriac continued his studies at the Faculty of Science in Bordeaux, obtaining a Bachelor of Science degree, then in 1902 a certificate in chemical, physical and natural sciences. In 1903, he began studying medicine on the advice of his brother-in-law Georges Fieux, husband of his elder sister Germaine and a professor of obstetrics at the Faculty of Medicine in Bordeaux. In October 1904, he passed the competitive examination for the externship programme in Bordeaux and was appointed to the surgical unit at Saint André Hospital. In 1905, he became a resident in the Bordeaux hospitals, his time as a resident in Professor Albert Pitres’ department would leave a lasting impression on him. He was also a student of Professors Xavier Arnozan, Emmanuel Régis and Jean Abadie. In 1909, he defended his doctoral thesis in medicine entitled The Serological Diagnosis of Syphilis: work from the Laboratory of Experimental Medicine.

=== Hospital and academic career in Bordeaux ===
in 1911, Pierre Mauriac was appointed assistant practitioner at Saint-André Hospital. Concurrently, he was assistant professor at the Faculty of Medicine, leading practical classes in medical semiology. In 1913, he was appointed full professor at the Faculty of Medicine in the general medicine section.

During the First World War, he held several positions from 1914 to 1918 in the Armed Forces Medical Service, and was a professor at the Soissons Medical Teaching Centre. Having been wounded, he was awarded the Croix de Guerre with two commendations and the Légion of Honour.

On his return to Bordeaux, he became a permanent practitioner of Bordeaux Hospitals at the central laboratory responsible for biological analyses at Saint-André Hospital, and served as its director from 1920 to 1931. Mauriac developed several biochemical methods of analysis, and the laboratory was one of the first in France to devise a technique for extracting insulin from animal pancreases, enabling the treatment of people with insulin-dependent diabetes.

During this period, he taught the course in general pathology and subsequently internal pathology at the Faculty of Medicine, as well as practical sessions in bacteriology and the module on experimental medicine. In 1926, he was appointed to the Chair of Experimental Medicine, than in 1931, to the Chair of Clinical Medicine following the untimely death of Professor Verger. He then became head of one of the clinical medicine departments at Saint-André Hospital, where he arrived every morning at eight o’clock sharp, whilst also seeing private patients in town at his practice located in his home on Rue Vauban in Bordeaux.

Portraits of Professor Pierre Mauriac and his pupils at the faculty of medicine of Bordeaux (1935)

He was a recognised specialist in diabetes and described Mauriac’s Syndrome in children with uncontrolled diabetes, characterised by hepatomegaly associated with stunted growth and mental retardation. Mauriac became a member of the Bordeaux Academy of Sciences, Literature and Arts in 1927, editor-in-chief of the Journal de Médecine de Bordeaux (1936–1944), and a national corresponding member of the National Academy of Medicine (Medicine Division) from 26 January 1937.

He wrote several books in which he set out his "priestly" vision of medicine, denouncing its dehumanization resulting from the development of a scientific and technical approach: "We are destroying medicine by seeking to dehumanise it [...] Gradually losing sight of the mystery of the human being, medicine has come to regard the individual merely as a component of a technical system". He opposed the development of preventive medicine: "The concern for public health turns every individual into a suspect threatened by disease", as well as any state control over the practice of medicine.

He was elected Dean of the Faculty of Medicine and Pharmacy at Bordeaux on 1 June 1934, and was re-elected on 1 June 1937, and again on 1 June 1940 by the Vichy government. Following the Liberation of France, he was suspended from his position as dean with effect from 4 September 1944 by a decree of the Ministry of Education dated 24 November 1944 (details in the section of the article After the Liberation). On 30 March 1946, he was simultaneously reinstated to his post and dismissed with a pension. Mauriac appealed to the French Council of State, which quashed the decision on 1 June 1949. Whilst he had been placed on leave from his university hospital duties, he was simultaneously reinstated and granted the right to claim his pension on 17 June 1950. He resumed his private practice and continued to publish scientific and literary articles and books.

== Involvement in politics ==
=== Membership of Action Française ===
After the First World War, Mauriac embraced the nationalist royalist ideology of Charles Maurras and joined the French political movement Action Française. He took part in Action Française medical banquets.

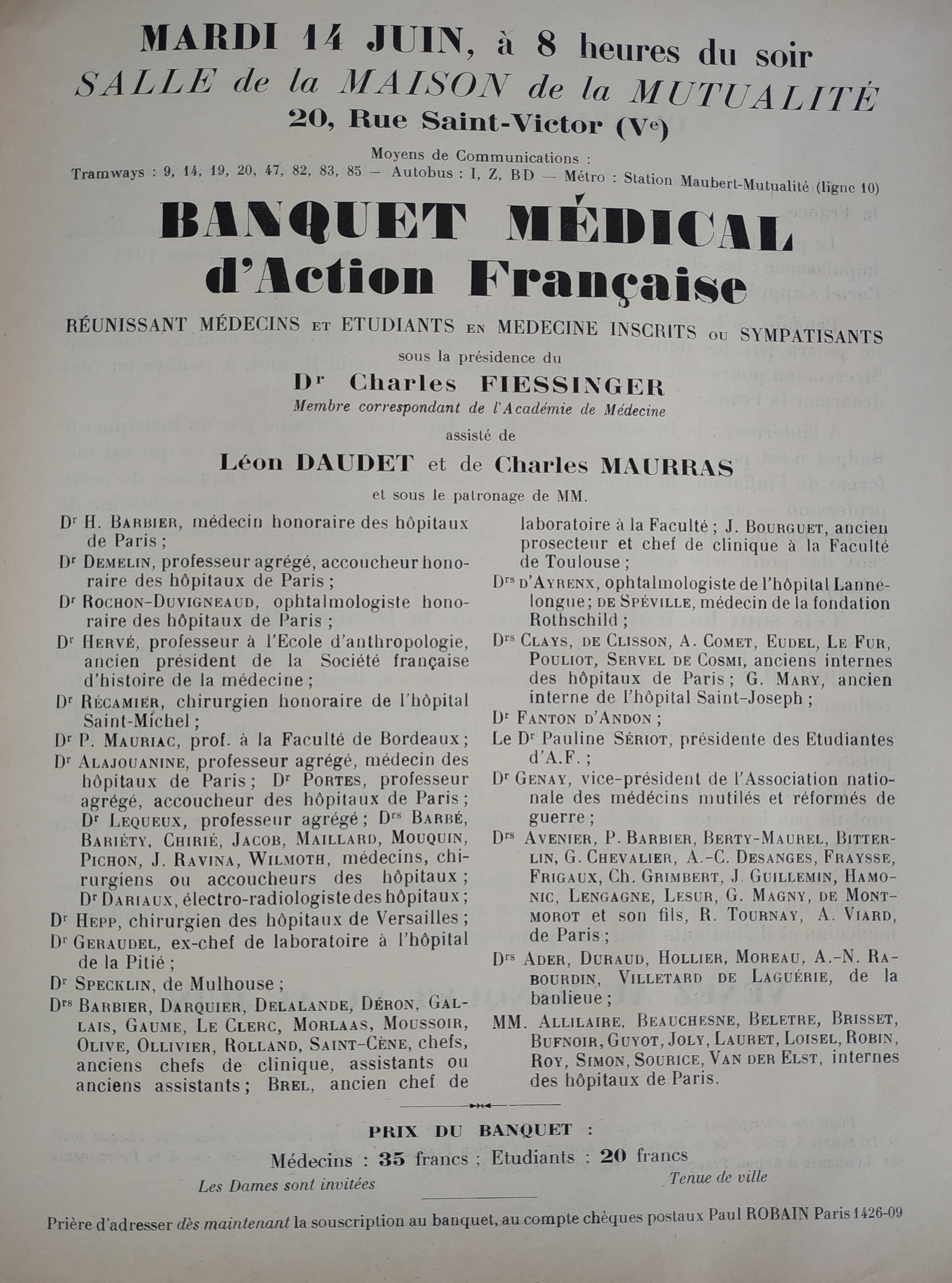
Participation of Pierre Mauriac in a medical banquet of Action Française in 1932

Raised by his mother and grandmother in a traditional religious household, Mauriac was a devout Catholic. He was shocked by the anticlericalism he encountered during his medical training: "I began my medical studies at a time when triumphant scientism was in full flow. Only the nationalist scholars exercised the freedom to assert their convictions. The word "God" was never uttered in the lecture theatres, while anticlerical jokes and assertions went unchallenged".

Affected by Pope Pius XI’s condemnation of Action Française in 1926—which forced people to choose between the Catholic Church and the Maurassian movement—he announced to his students: "Gentlemen, I have made my choice; I remain faithful to Action Française! ". As a member of Action Française, he was banned from the Catholic Church. In the account of Mauriac by Eugen Weber in his book Action Française: Royalism and Reaction in Twentieth Century France, Mauriac mentioned that he did not receive Holy Communion for four years. In 1928, Mauriac and Professor Henri Carteron from the University of Strasbourg launched a petition by Catholic professors "for forgiveness and reconciliation", which was quietly abandoned in the face of attacks from the liberals.

=== The Second World War and the German occupation ===
==== Support for the Vichy regime ====
When the Second World War broke out, Mauriac stepped down from his post as dean to serve as an army adviser, voluntarily heading for the front whilst his five sons were being called up. Following the French army defeat of 1939, he resumed his post as dean. His support for Maréchal Philippe Pétain never wavered throughout the Nazi Occupation, and he made it clear at the beginning of every academic year in his addresses to medical and pharmacy students:

"Amidst the turbulent currents of divided opinion that toss us about mercilessly, there is a beacon of light upon which our eyes remain fixed; we have a rock to which our hands may firmly cling. Whatever songs of patriotism, justice or pity the sirens of dissent may sing, true patriotism stands out. Isn’t the hero of Verdun the most patriotic person of all? As for politics, in order to banish it from the university, to put an end to discussions, criticisms and party squabbles, I implore you to place your trust unquestioningly in Maréchal Pétain and to pursue your studies diligently."

— Pierre Mauriac, November 1941

"As Pascal says, you are on board, on board a ship in distress, and your duty is simple: say nothing, do nothing that might thwart the leader’s life-saving action; help him with all your heart to struggle through appalling conditions and to triumph... Our strength no longer lies in cannons, tanks or aeroplanes. It lies in our unity around the Leader. "

— Pierre Mauriac, November 1942

"A wave of accusations and insults is sweeping across the earth and the heavens, but it peters out at the Maréchal’s feet, whose detachment and greatness no one—save a few wretched Frenchmen speaking to the French people—dares to question."

— Pierre Mauriac, November 1943

In 1941, he also expressed his satisfaction that the Nazi occupation had not affected the running of the faculty: "it is my duty to pay tribute to the discreet liberalism of the occupying authorities, who at no point interfered with the academic life of our institution". In 1942, Mauriac urged his older students to step up and take the place of the doctors held as prisoners of war in Germany: "You who have never been called up—neither to the barracks, nor to a youth camp, nor to the armed forces—think of the five hundred doctors and pharmacists who, for the past 36 months, have devoted themselves to their unfortunate brothers, and offer to relieve them. For the honour of the medical profession, my greatest hope is that conscription will not be necessary".

In the same speech, Mauriac referred to the suicide of professor Jean Auriac (1906-1941), professor of medical physics and member of the Resistance, who founded in 1941 the Auriac-Bergez intelligence group within the "Confrérie Notre-Dame" Resistance network. Arrested on 18 July 1941 on the premises of the Faculty of Medicine, he committed suicide by ingesting mercury cyanide so as not to betray the members of his group. Mauriac, who had remained silent following the arrest of a professor on university premises and did not attend his funeral, commented on this landmark event for the academic community as follows:

"[…] Professor Barthe has passed away, and after him one of your most beloved young lecturers, Professor Auriac, whose scruples, conscience and sensitivity were so deeply stirred by the harsh upheavals of the times that he was broken and collapsed, leaving behind only the memory of a name now linked to the tragedy of the moment. [...] shame on those who find the energy only in the shadows to scrawl foolish graffiti on walls or to become involved in derisory plots; a curse upon those whose cowardly, anonymous attacks exact the appalling ransom of hostages shot to death."

— Dean Pierre Mauriac, November 1941

In the administrative charges filed against Pierre Mauriac in the epuration légale (legal purge) carried out after the Liberation, these remarks were accused of having had the effect of: "[…] masking, under the general terms of a writer’s psychology, the discrete background and true significance (which one could at the time surmise, if not know exactly) of the suicide of the young professor Auriac".

Mauriac was a recipient of the Order of the Francisque and belonged to the Association of Friends of the Maréchal.

==== Gironde departmental council of the order of physicians ====
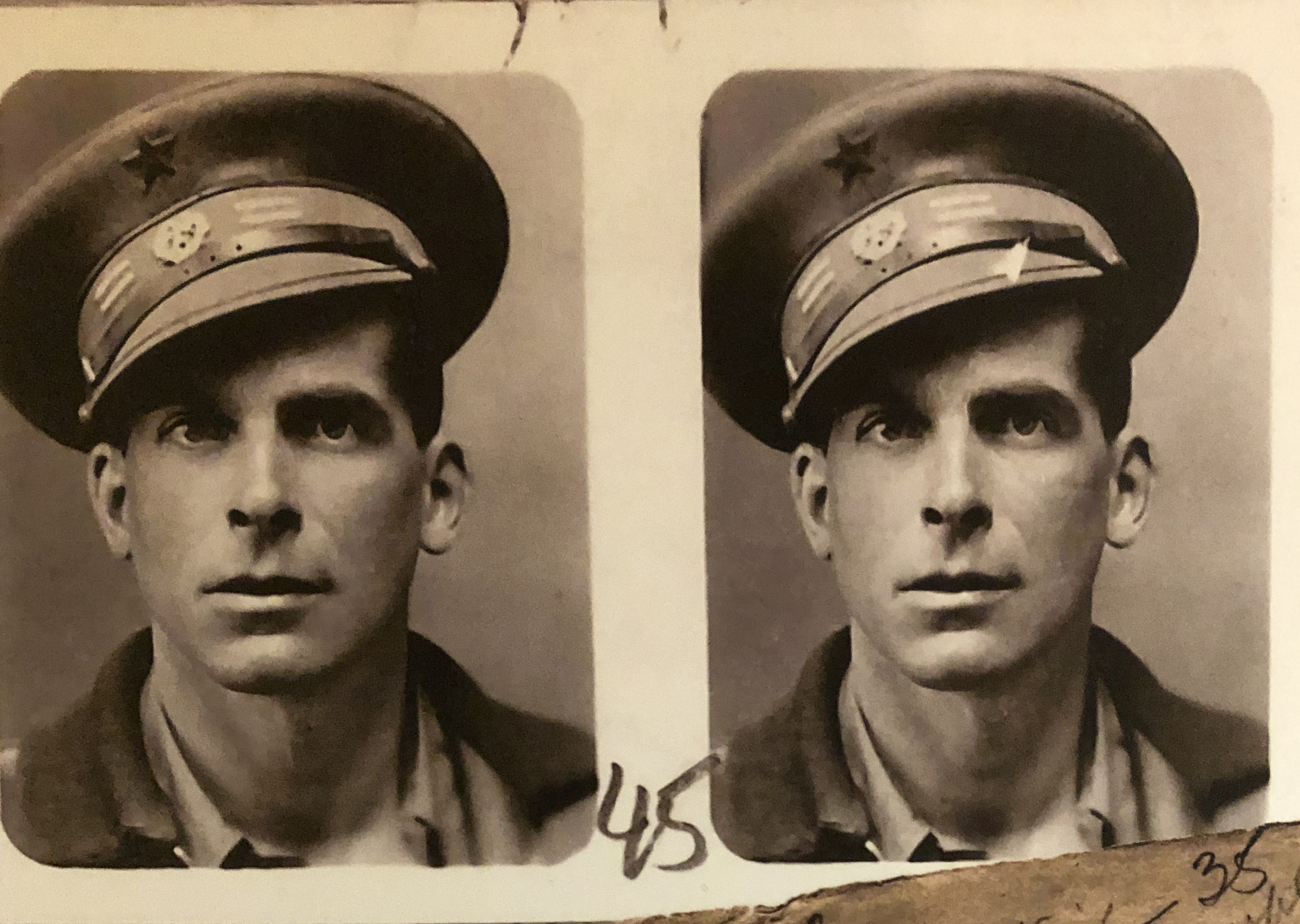
Dr Charles Nancel-Pénard (1906–1941) executed by the Nazi army at the Souge camp (Martillas, France)

As soon as the French order of physicians was established by the Vichy government, Pierre Mauriac was appointed Chairman of the Gironde departmental council of the order. He held this post throughout the Nazi occupation, and made sure his team of doctors shared his political views.

===== Role of the order of physicians in the execution of Dr Charles Nancel-Pénard =====
When Dr Charles Nancel-Pénard (1906–1941), a communist activist, member of the International Brigades and of the Resistance, was imprisoned in Bordeaux in October 1940, a petition was signed by numerous doctors in Bordeaux calling for his release. This petition was condemned on 24 January 1941 by a motion of the Gironde departmental council of the order of physicians, chaired by Mauriac:

"Given that Dr Nancel-Pénard has in the past undertaken significant political activity in support of communism; and given that as a doctor resident at the Pessac sanatorium, he took advantage of the influence conferred upon him by this post to create veritable communist cells within his professional sphere; and that he played a major role in leading fellow junior doctors astray, succeeding in persuading them to share his views in support of the Reds in Spain to the extent that they went to that country to fight on their side; and given that on his return from Spain he continued his propaganda in the place where he then settled [...] The Gironde departmental council of the order of physicians disapproves of the petition submitted by a number of doctors in Bordeaux calling for the release of Dr Nancel-Pénard".

Charles Nancel-Pénard was briefly released from prison in February 1941, but was again arrested in June 1941. He was executed by firing squad at the Souge camp in Martillas-sur-Jalle (Gironde) on 24 October 1941 along with 49 other prisoners, including his friend, the communist resistance fighter Roger Allo, in retaliation for the Resistance's assassination of a German officer.

===== Xenophobic statements and the revocation of Dr Sabatino Schinazi's medical licence =====
On 30 January 1942, during a meeting in Paris of the presidents and delegates of the departmental councils of the order of physicians of the occupied zone, Pierre Mauriac expressed the hope "that the removal of foreigners from the medical profession will be pursued without hesitation".

Stolperstein in Bordeaux, in front of the house of Sabatino Schinazi (1893–1945) victim of the Holocaust

Dr Sabatino Schinazi (1893–1945) was a doctor born in Egypt to Italian parents, who became a French national after marrying a Catholic woman from Bordeaux. As a general practitioner in the working-class neighbourhood of Bacalan in Bordeaux, he was nicknamed the "doctor of the poor". Following the enactment of the 1940 Vichy anti-Jewish legislation, Schinazi was registered in the "Jewish register". He applied for an exemption so as not to be struck off the order of physicians on the grounds of his religion because he was married to a "non-jew" wife.

In February 1941, the Gironde departmental council of the order of physicians, chaired by Mauriac, issued an unfavourable opinion on his request for an exemption: "From a moral standpoint, he has a poor reputation, having colluded with radical elements who have caused so much harm to France [...] Dr Schinazi is the epitome of the unscrupulous foreigner. He is an inherently undesirable recruit for French medicine". Schinazi was struck off the register on 31 March 1942 by a letter signed by Maurice Papon. Arrested in June of that same year, he spent 17 months in an internment camp at Mérignac (Gironde), was deported to the Drancy internment camp and then to Auschwitz, and died victim of the Holocaust at Dachau on 25 February 1945. A Stolperstein (memorial stone) was laid on 29 September 2022 outside his home at 199 Rue Achard in Bordeaux in his memory.

==== Pierre Mauriac’s family during the occupation ====
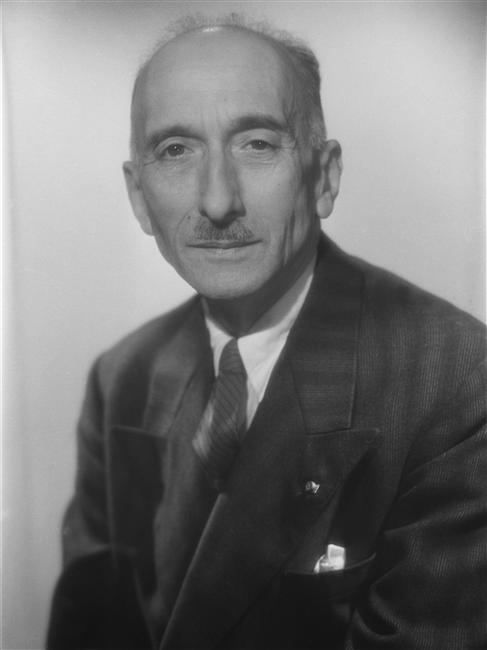
François Mauriac (1885–1970), Nobel Prize in literature

Whilst Pierre Mauriac was a member of Action Française and a supporter of Pétain, his younger brother François Mauriac was a member of political and religious movement Le Sillon and took a stand against the Vichy regime. François commented on these contrasting political viewpoints: "Pierre and I climbed the same mountain, but each from a different side". These political differences did not undermine their brotherly bond, which François described in 1965, two years after Pierre's death: "Differences in political opinion and their absolute opposition do not necessarily breed hatred. But that is an understatement: sometimes they do not in any way diminish a deep and secret affection such as that which united my brother Pierre, the Maurrassian, and me, the Sillonist".

His other brother, Father Jean Mauriac, the third of the siblings, died by suicide on 24 December 1944. A chaplain at the Lycée Montaigne in Bordeaux, he, like François, joined the Sillonist movement. On 14 July 1944, young Resistance fighters belonging to a group of the FFI (French Forces of the Interior) were attacked in their hideout at the Ferme de Richemont near Saucats (Gironde) by the French Militia and the Gestapo, and almost all of them were killed. Several of them were pupils at the Lycée Montaigne whom Jean Mauriac knew well, and he was deeply affected by their execution. Pierre Mauriac told François that there had been a "terrible accident". The suicide was concealed by the family and the clergy, and a memorial service for the deceased was held at his church in Talence.

=== After the Liberation ===
==== House arrest and trial for collaboration ====
Following the Liberation of Bordeaux on 28 August 1944, Pierre Mauriac, who was suspected of collaboration, was placed under house arrest on 6 September 1944. He was charged in March 1945 with undermining state security. His trial began on 15 July 1945; he was accused of "intensive propaganda amongst his students in favour of Pétain’s policies" and of being responsible for the execution of Dr Charles Nancel-Pénard.

An article in the Communist newspaper La Gironde Populaire, signed by The Association of the Families of Those Executed, demanded justice: "Mauriac, responsible for the death of the young patriotic doctor Nancel-Pénard; Mauriac, who with his own hand wrote the letter that condemned the young patriot. Enough leniency – criminals with blood on their hands must pay; we demand that justice be done". André Leray, who was known in the Resistance as "Izaute" and was arrested at the same time as Nancel-Pénard, testified to the pressure exerted by Mauriac on the doctors who had signed the petition calling for Nancel-Pénard's release, in order to get them to withdraw their signatures. Izaute attested that, contrary to Mauriac's claims, he did not visit Nancel-Pénard whilst he was in detention. Izaute stated being "convinced that Nancel-Pénard was arrested again and held as a hostage as a result of pressure exerted by Dr Mauriac".

In his defence, Mauriac stated that he had merely conveyed the position of the Higher Council of Physicians, the national body of the Medical Council. The trial lasted two days and concluded on 17 July 1945 with the case finally being dismissed. Mauriac's house arrest was maintained for eighteen months and was lifted in 1946.

François Mauriac, who was close to General Charles de Gaulle, intervened on his brother's behalf "to secure a lenient sentence" for his brother's alleged collaboration. In June 1945, François informed Pierre that the "case is dismissed". He subsequently secured the lifting of house arrest through the direct intervention of General de Gaulle, who issued the order via Maurice Schumann. Pierre Mauriac's nephew, Claude Mauriac (1914–1996, son of François), who was affectionate toward his uncle, was also close to the General, having served as his private secretary since 1944.

==== Administrative purge in higher education ====
After being suspended from his post as dean on 4 September 1944, Pierre Mauriac became the subject of an administrative purge. His activities during the occupation were assessed by an administrative inquiry conducted by the Bordeaux Academic Inquiry Committee. The committee's recommendation was that he be dismissed with a pension, on the basis of the evidence available: "fervent pro-Vichy views; intense propaganda amongst students in support of the Pétain’s policies; gave the order to comply with Pétain’s instructions and encouraged doctors to join the voluntary relief effort; bears definite responsibility for the conviction of Dr Pénard but was exonerated by the acquittal handed down by the Bordeaux Court of Justice on 17 July 1945; also taking into account his scientific merit and his status as the head of a large family". The Higher Investigation Committee approved this proposal, and Pierre Mauriac was dismissed with a pension on 30 March 1946.

Following his dismissal, some of Mauriac's students proposed that a motion of support be put to a vote by the Council of the Faculty of Medicine and Pharmacy. After deliberation, the council, meeting on 18 June 1946, did not endorse this motion: "Professor Mauriac has taught in this university for over thirty years; he served as our Dean for many years. Through his work, his teaching and the students he has trained, he has proved himself worthy of his predecessors; the standard of teaching has not declined under his leadership. He has been subject to an administrative measure concerning his position as Dean; whilst we accept this sanction, we wish to affirm that he retains our respect and our scientific esteem".

The administrative sanction was quashed on 1 June 1949 by a ruling of the French Council of State, which based its decision on the following points: Mauriac's responsibility for Dr Nancel-Pénard's conviction was not established by the evidence in the case file; Mauriac's attitude and opinions prior to 1939 were not to be taken into consideration; he could not be blamed for approving the release of imprisoned doctors, since healthcare professionals were not considered prisoners of war and had to be repatriated.

Pierre Mauriac remained forever loyal to Pétain. Invited by the Medical Council to address the new doctors in 1961, he referred to him in his speech. To mark his eightieth birthday, a private ceremony was held on 22 April 1962 at the Splendid Hotel in Bordeaux. Although the ceremony was not part of any official academic event, many of the city's leading figures attended. In his speech thanking his student Professor Pierre Broustet, his brother François, the Dean of the Faculty of Medicine, and the Rector of the academy for their laudatory remarks, Mauriac stated: "For having chosen to remain loyal to a great soldier […], I was dismissed from all my posts, placed under house arrest for eighteen months, and despite the Council of State’s ruling that this constituted an abuse of power and that I should be reinstated, I never was".

When Pierre Mauriac died on 1 November 1963 in Bordeaux, de Gaulle sent a letter of condolence to his brother François: "My dear François, I know how much your brother was your brother. Allow me tell you that I share with you the great sorrow caused by his passing. Professor Pierre Mauriac was a man of great intellect and great heart. In him, our country has lost a distinguished figure, and I am deeply saddened by his passing".
