= Argelouse =

- Commune
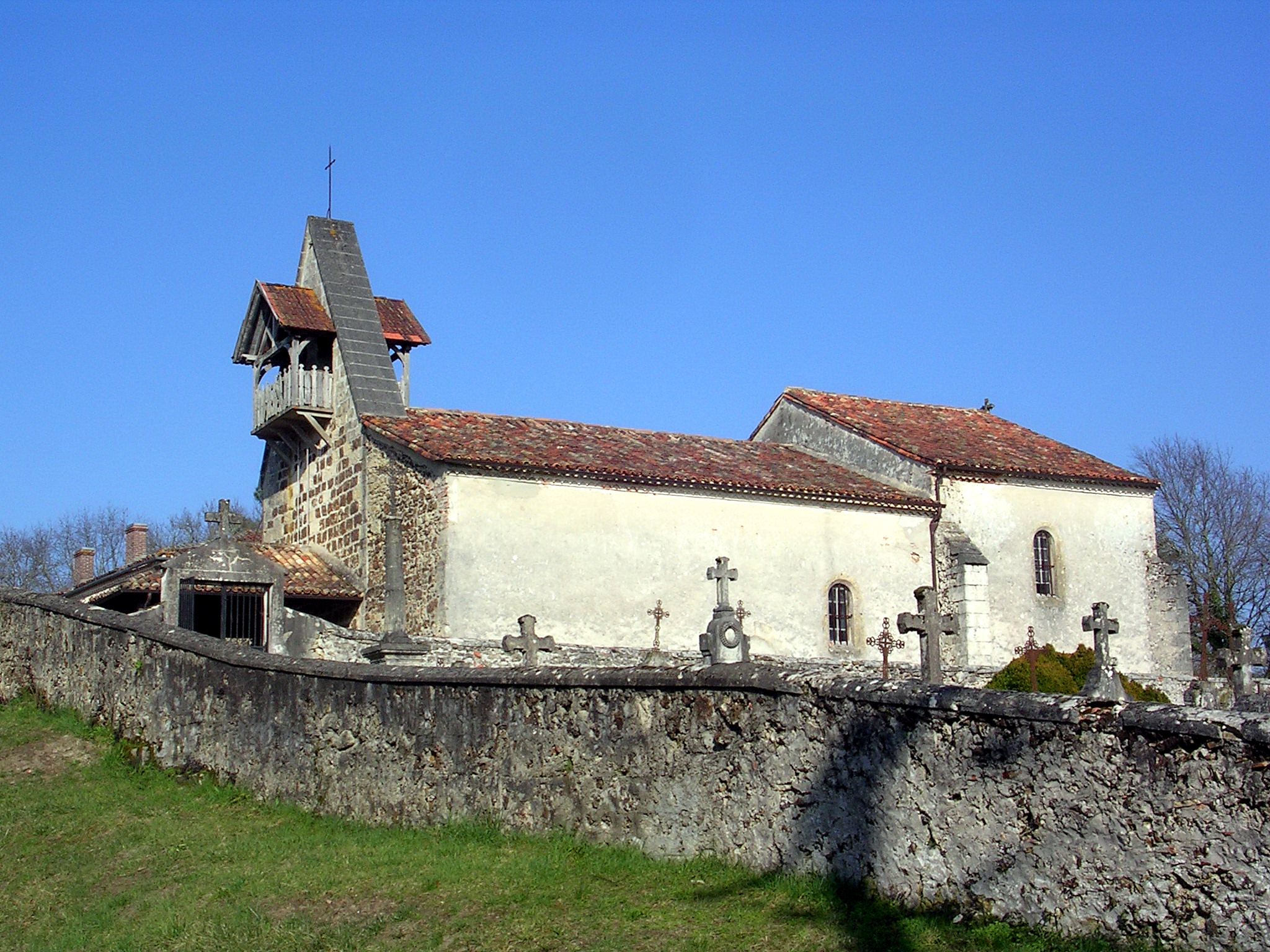
- The church of Argelouse
- Location of Argelouse
- Location within France Location within Nouvelle-Aquitaine
- Coordinates: 44°22′01″N 0°38′42″W
- Country: France
- Region: Nouvelle-Aquitaine
- Department: Landes
- Arrondissement: Mont-de-Marsan
- Canton: Haute Lande Armagnac
- Intercommunality: CC Cœur Haute Lande

Government
  - Mayor (2020–2026): Joël Lalanne
- Area^{1}: 22.79 km^{2} (8.80 sq mi)
- Elevation: 61 m (200 ft)
- Highest elevation: 73 m (240 ft)
- Lowest elevation: 39 m (128 ft)
- Population (2023): 92
  - Density: 4.0/km^{2} (10/sq mi)
- Time zone: UTC+01:00 (CET)
  - Summer (DST): UTC+02:00 (CEST)
- INSEE/Postal code: 40008 /40430
- ^{1} French Land Register data, which excludes lakes, ponds, glaciers > 1 km^{2} (0.386 sq mi or 247 acres) and river estuaries.

Argelouse (French pronunciation: [aʁʒəluz]; Gascon: Argelosa) is a commune of the Landes department in Nouvelle-Aquitaine in southwestern France. Made famous by being a locality in the 1927 novel Thérèse Desqueyroux by François Mauriac.

== Population ==
Historical population
| Year | Pop. | ±% p.a. |
|---|---|---|
| 1968 | 37 | — |
| 1975 | 37 | +0.00% |
| 1982 | 55 | +5.83% |
| 1990 | 54 | −0.23% |
| 1999 | 55 | +0.20% |
| 2007 | 85 | +5.59% |
| 2012 | 94 | +2.03% |
| 2017 | 93 | −0.21% |
| 2023 | 92 | −0.18% |
Source: INSEE

== See also ==
- Communes of the Landes department
- Parc naturel régional des Landes de Gascogne
