= Polygamy in Africa =

Polygamy in Africa has existed throughout the history of Africa. Polygamy, particularly polygyny, is a highly valued social institution in Africa. Polygamy is a marriage between a man or woman and their multiple spouses. Polygyny is a marriage between a man and multiple wives. Polyandry is a marriage between a woman and multiple husbands.

A common expectation for African kings is to symbolically unify their kingdoms and societies through partaking in polygamous marriages with wives from a broad range of clans within the society. By doing so, the king reduces the chance of dissident and rival forces developing and rising against him.

== History ==
=== North Africa ===
==== Egypt ====
Evidence for polygamy in ancient Egypt can be found among both the Middle Kingdom and New Kingdom.

During the dynastic rule of Amenophis III, numerous polygynous marriages between Amenophis III and foreign princesses occurred, which later led to the princesses being buried in the Valley of the Queens along with the following description of them as part of the harem of the king: “'She of numerous nights in the city of the brilliant Aten'; 'She who appears in glory in the temple of the brilliant Aten'; 'She who strikes with fury for the brilliant Aten'.”

An example of polygamy from a 20th Dynasty period papyrus, which is one among several other examples from the 20th Dynasty that highlight grave robberies, highlights the tribunal case of gold worker, Ramose. During the case, Mutemhab, his wife, indicated during her testimony that he had two dead wives and another wife who was not dead. Ramose was brought to trial for grave robbery and not polygamy.

While Herodotus characterized the ancient Egyptians as being monogamous, Diodorus characterized the ancient Egyptians as being polygamous; according to Diodorus Siculus, "In accordance with the marriage-customs of the Egyptians the priests have but one wife, but any other man takes as many as he may determine; and the Egyptians are required to raise all their children in order to increase the population, on the ground that large numbers are the greatest factor in increasing the prosperity of both country and cities."

=== West Africa ===
==== Ivory Coast ====
23% of men were found to be participating in a polygynous marriage in 1988. The average polygynist man was found to have 2.3 wives, with higher rates of polygyny found in rural areas than in Abidjan. From 1955 to 1988, rates of polygyny in Ivory Coast remained fairly consistent, occurring with four out of 10 married women. There was some decline found in rural areas from the early 1960s to mid-1970s.

==== Mali ====
Between the 12th century CE and the 15th century CE, polygamy was a cultural practice of the Mali Empire. In the Mande narrative of Sundiata Keita’s Epic, Keita partook in a polygamous marriage with two women, whom he had children with, and whose children were in political competition with one another.

==== Mauritania ====
In Tichitt culture, households may have been used by extended families or polygamous families at locations such as Akreijit.

==== Nigeria ====
Nigeria as a whole does not recognise polygamous unions under civil law. However, 12 out of the 36 states recognise polygamous marriages as equivalent to monogamous marriages, and these states are governed by Sharia law. Nigeria has one of the highest rates of polygamy in the world.

=== East Africa ===
==== Uganda ====
During the Kingdom of Buganda, the king of Buganda partook in polygynous marriages to reduce the chance of dissident and rival forces developing and rising against him.

== Customs ==
=== North Africa ===
==== Egypt ====
While monogamy was predominant among ancient Egyptians, neither customs and traditions nor laws of ancient Egypt criminalize polygamy. A husband treating his wife well, family stability, and wholesome co-parenting was encouraged. The act of adultery was socially stigmatized. Women could also compose their own marital contracts, which may have contributed to lower rates of divorce and opportunities for polygyny.

Kings of ancient Egypt partook in polygynous marriages. Politically arranged polygynous marriages occurred between male members of the royal family and foreign princesses. While lower class and middle class men mostly could not afford to financially support more than two wives or wife and concubine(s), kings and upper class men could afford to engage in polygamy, with kings having many wives and concubines and upper class men having at least one wife and some concubines.

It can be difficult to draw broad conclusions about the ancient Egyptians and polygamy due to the frequent ambiguity found among available evidence from ancient Egypt. For example, a 20th Dynasty period papyrus includes the following common example found among available evidence: “‘The citizeness A, the wife of B, and the citizeness C, his other wife, in total 2.’” As Watterson (2011) states regarding this common example: “The reference may be to two contemporaneous wives; on the other hand, wife A may have been divorced or dead before B married wife C – there is nothing to indicate which was the real state of affairs.”

Less ambiguous evidence for polygamy in ancient Egypt can be found among both the Middle Kingdom and New Kingdom. Examples from the Middle Kingdom involve people from among the bureaucrat class of ancient Egypt. An example from a papyrus, which is one among several other examples from the 20th Dynasty that highlight grave robberies, highlights the tribunal case of gold worker, Ramose; during the case, Mutemhab, his wife, indicated during her testimony that he had two dead wives and another wife who was not dead; notably, Ramose was subsequently brought to trial for grave robbery and not polygamy.

During the dynastic rule of Amenophis III, numerous polygynous marriages between Amenophis III and foreign princesses occurred, which later led to the princesses being buried in the Valley of the Queens along with the following description of them as part of the harem of the king: “'She of numerous nights in the city of the brilliant Aten'; 'She who appears in glory in the temple of the brilliant Aten'; 'She who strikes with fury for the brilliant Aten'.”

While Herodotus characterized the ancient Egyptians as being monogamous, Diodorus characterized the ancient Egyptians as being polygamous; according to Diodorus Siculus, "In accordance with the marriage-customs of the Egyptians the priests have but one wife, but any other man takes as many as he may determine; and the Egyptians are required to raise all their children in order to increase the population, on the ground that large numbers are the greatest factor in increasing the prosperity of both country and cities."

=== West Africa ===
==== Ivory Coast ====
Following the development of Ivory Coast’s first national census in 1975 CE, 23% of men were found to be participating in a polygynous marriage in 1988 CE, and the average polygynist man was found to have 2.3 wives, with higher rates of polygyny found in rural areas than in Abidjan. From 1955 CE to 1988 CE, rates of polygyny in Ivory Coast remained fairly consistent, occurring with four out of 10 married women, though there was some decline found in rural areas from the early 1960s CE to mid-1970s CE.

==== Mali ====
Between the 12th century CE and the 15th century CE, polygamy was a cultural practice of the Mali Empire. In the Mande narrative of Sundiata Keita’s Epic, Keita partook in a polygamous marriage with two women, whom he had children with, and whose children were in political competition with one another.

==== Mauritania ====
In Tichitt culture, households may have been used by extended families or polygamous families at locations such as Akreijit.

==== Nigeria ====
While it is not recognised in the entire country polygynous marriages exist in every states in Nigeria, with the lowest rates seen in Abia State 3%, and the highest in Jigawa State 45%. Nigeria has a slightly more prevalent Muslim population, but there is also a large Christian population that overall opposes polygyny (see: Religion in Nigeria). Despite this, Christians in the South of Nigeria still practice polygynous unions.

=== East Africa ===
==== Uganda ====
During the Kingdom of Buganda, the king of Buganda partook in polygynous marriages to reduce the chance of dissident and rival forces developing and rising against him.
