= Mother Teresa (disambiguation) =

Mother Teresa or Mother Teresa of Calcutta (1910–1997) was an Albanian-Indian Catholic nun and saint who founded the Missionaries of Charity, known for its work among the poor in India.

Mother Teresa may also refer to:

- Frances Mary Teresa Ball or Mother Teresa Ball (1794–1861), foundress of the Irish Branch of the Institute of the Blessed Virgin Mary
- Teresa Lalor or Mother Teresa Lalor (1769–1846), Irish-born American Catholic nun

Mother Teresa of Calcutta may also refer to:

- Mother Teresa of Calcutta (film), a 2003 documentary film
- Mother Teresa (2002), an Indian short documentary film about the saint by Amar Kumar Bhattacharya; produced by the Films Division of India
- Mother Teresa: No Greater Love, 2022 American documentary film

== See also ==
- Teresa (disambiguation)
- Saint Teresa (disambiguation)
- Commemorations of Mother Teresa, lists things named after Mother Teresa of Calcutta
- List of saints named Teresa
