= Akreijit =

- Location in Mauritania
- Coordinates: 18°24′0″N 9°15′0″W
- Country: Mauritania
- Region: Tagant

Akreijit is a town situated in central Mauritania. The town was founded in the mid-19th century by a group of herders in the Tichit region.

Numerous archeological expeditions have occurred within the vicinity of the town.
