= Teresa (novel) =

Teresa is an 1886 novel by the Italian writer Neera, real name Anna Radius Zuccari. The story of the heroine Teresa Caccia has parallels with Zuccari's own early life.
