= Louis Artus =

French playwright (1870–1960)

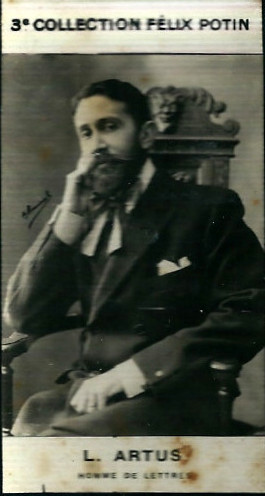
- Born: 10 January 1870; 8th arrondissement of Paris
- Died: 11 May 1960 (aged 90); 6th arrondissement of Paris
- Occupations: Writer, dramatist

Louis Artus (10 January 1870 - 11 May 1960) was a French writer.

A dramatist, playwright, novelist and critic, Artus began his career with parts in verse such as La Duchesse Putiphar. After studying with the Jesuits (in France and England), Artus, who regularly attended literary circles, collaborated with various newspapers like Le Gaulois, Excelsior, L'Intransigeant, Le Petit Journal, etc. He revealed himself as deeply Christian, attracted by the mysticism of the Middle Ages, and wrote several novels of Catholic inspiration.

Artus died in Paris at age 90.

He wrote several boulevard plays :

- 1905: Cœur de moineau
- 1907: L'Amour en banque
- 1907: L'Ingénu libertin
- 1910: Le Petit Dieu
- 1929: Un homme d'hier

He also wrote novels, particularly his famous trilogy :

- 1918: La Maison du fou (chronique de Saint-Léonard), éd. Emile-Paul frères
- 1920: La Maison du sage (histoire d'un crime), éd. Emile-Paul frères
- 1922:Le Vin de ta vigne (nouvelle chronique de Saint-Léonard), éd. Emile-Paul frères

and

- 1926: La chercheuse d'amour, éd. Bernard Grasset
- 1928: Les chiens de Dieu, éd. Bernard Grasset
- 1930: Au soir de Port-Royal, éd. Bernard Grasset
- 1932: Paix sur la terre ?, éd. Bernard Grasset
- 1939: L'hérésie du bonheur, éd. Plon
- 1945: La plus belle histoire d'amour du monde, éd. Denoël

== Comedian ==
- 1909 : Beethoven by René Fauchois, directed by André Antoine at the Théâtre de l'Odéon
