= Thérèse Raquin (disambiguation) =

Thérèse Raquin is an 1868 novel and a 1873 play by Émile Zola.

Thérèse Raquin may also refer to:

- Thérèse Raquin (1928 film), a film based on the novel by Zola
- Thérèse Raquin (1953 film), a film based on the Zola novel
- Thérèse Raquin (opera), a 2-act 2001 U.S. opera by Tobias Picker and Gene Scheer, based on the Zola novel
