= Action Française, Royalism and Reaction in Twentieth-Century France =

1962 book by Eugen Weber

- Editor: Stanford University press
- Author: Eugen Weber
- Publication date: 1962
- Publication place: United States of America
- Pages: 650
- ISBN: 2-01-016210-2

Action Française, Royalism and Reaction in Twentieth-Century France is a work by American historian Eugen Weber originally published on 1962 and translated into French on 1964, focused on the study of the royalist Action Française movement.

== Presentation ==
Considered "one of the specialists of our contemporary history", Eugen Weber publishes a monumental sum on the history of the Action française. He conceives of the history of Action Française as "a kind of political novel with surprising twists". He analyzes the "multiple paths of royalism, nationalism and Maurrassism of Action Française" during the first half of the 20th century.

The first police report that attests to the existence of Action Française is from 4 July 2023. In May 1906, another report states that all "reactionary troops" now follow Action Française. Eugen Weber details how Action Française imposed itself despite the weakness of its means at the beginning. In 1909, the Action française had only 180 militants.

The author sheds light on the complexity of Maurras' attitude during the Second World War by juxtaposing his unwavering support for the Vichy regime until 1944 with "his hatred of Germany, refusing to receive Brasillach, to publish pro- -Germans or to announce "European" meetings".

== Sources ==
Eugen Weber relies on the analysis of the Parisian press but also of provincial newspapers such as La Nouvelle Guyenne and L'Eclair from Montpellier. The historian uses private archives, in particular those of Francisque Gay and Charles Maurras. It reveals in particular a correspondence of sixteen letters between Charles Maurras and the President of the Republic Raymond Poincaré between 1918 and 1925. Eugen Weber explains that these exchanges are those of allies and that Maurras had no direct influence on the president. He uses the police reports kept at the National Archives and has special authorization to use the bundles of the period 1914-1939 unlike the historian Frank Tannenbaum who publishes a book on the same subject the same year.

== Reception ==
The book is immediately authoritative on the subject. It is hailed as the "starting point for useful backtracking" as "a first solid synthesis on this major question".

== Bibliography ==
- John C. Cairns (1963). "Revue de L'Action française". The American Historical Review. 69: 122–124. doi:10.1086/ahr/69.1.122.
- Laponce, Jean (1964). "Action Française : Royalism and Reaction in Twentieth-Century France by Eugen Weber (revue)". The Canadian Historical Review (in French). 45 (1): 54–55. ISSN 1710-1093.
- R., S. (1985). "Revue de L'Action française". La Revue administrative. 38 (228): 641–641. ISSN 0035-0672.
- E. P. (1964). "Revue de L'Action française". Archives de sociologie des religions (in French): 221.
- Micaud, Charles (1963). "Revue de l'Action Française: Royalism and Reaction in Twentieth-Century France". The Journal of Politics. 25 (3): 597–599. doi:10.2307/2127985. ISSN 0022-3816.
- Driggs, O. Truman (1963). "Revue de l'Action Française: Royalism and Reaction in Twentieth-Century France". The Western Political Quarterly. 16 (3): 746–748. doi:10.2307/444795. ISSN 0043-4078.
- Prost, Antoine (1966). "Revue de l'Action française, Royalism and Reaction in the twentieth century France; The Action Française. Die-hard reactionnaries in twentieth century France". Revue Historique (in French). 235 (2): 540–543. ISSN 0035-3264.
- Slama, Alain-Gérard (1970). "Revue de l'Action Française, Royalism and reaction in twentieth century France. 2nd ed". Revue française de science politique (in French). 20 (3): 570–573. ISSN 0035-2950.
- Arnaud, P. (1963). "Revue de l'Action Française: Royalism and Reaction in Twentieth Century France". L'Année sociologique (in French). 14: 222–223. ISSN 0066-2399.
- Lebovics, Herman (1963). "Revue de l'Action française. Royalism and reaction in twentieth-century France". Current History. 45 (266): 240–240. ISSN 0011-3530.
- Nolte, Ernst (1964). "Revue de l'Action Française. Royalism and Reaction in Twentieth-Century France". Historische Zeitschrift (in German). 199 (3): 694–701. ISSN 0018-2613.
- Fox, E. W. (1964). "Revue de l'Action Française: Royalism and Reaction in Twentieth-Century France". The Journal of Modern History. 36 (1): 99–100. ISSN 0022-2801.
- Byrnes, Robert F. (1964). "Revue de l'Action Française: Royalism and Reaction in Twentieth-Century France". The Annals of the American Academy of Political and Social Science. 352: 216–217. ISSN 0002-7162.
- Bell, Philip Michael Hett (1965). "Revue de l'Action Française. Royalism and Reaction in Twentieth-Century France". The English Historical Review. 80 (315): 441–442. ISSN 0013-8266.
- Roudiez, Leon S. (1965). "Maurras and the Action Française in Historical Perspective". The Modern Language Journal. 49 (7): 443–446. doi:10.2307/322563. ISSN 0026-7902.
