= Teressa =

Teressa may refer to:

- Teressa Island, one of the Nicobar Islands in the Indian Ocean, part of the Nicobar Islands in the Indian territory of Andaman and Nicobar Islands
- Teressa language, the Nicobarese (Austroasiatic) language spoken on the island

== See also ==
- Teressa Liane (born 1988), Australian actress
- Teresa (disambiguation)
