= Claude Mauriac =

French author and journalist (1914–1996)

Jean Marc Claude Mauriac (25 April 1914 – 22 March 1996) was a French essayist, novelist and journalist.

Mauriac was born in Paris, the eldest son of author François Mauriac. He was the personal secretary of Charles de Gaulle from 1944 to 1949, before becoming a film critic and art critic of Le Figaro. He was the author of several novels and essays, and co-scripted the film adaptation of his father's novel Thérèse Desqueyroux. He also wrote a study of the novelist Marcel Proust, his wife's great-uncle.

Mauriac was a close friend of French philosopher Michel Foucault.

== Bibliography ==
=== Essays ===
- Introduction à une mystique de l'enfer (Grasset, 1938)
- Jean Cocteau ou la Vérité du mensonge (Odette Lieutier, 1945)
- Aimer Balzac (La Table Ronde, 1945)
- La Trahison d'un clerc (La Table Ronde, 1945)
- Malraux ou le mal du héros (Grasset, 1946)
- André Breton (Éditions de Flore, 1949)
- Marcel Proust par lui-même (Collections Microcosme, "Écrivains de toujours", Le Seuil, 1953)
- Hommes et idées d'aujourd'hui (Albin Michel, 1953)
- L'Amour du cinéma (Albin Michel, 1954)
- Petite littérature du cinéma (Le Cerf, 1957)
- L'Alittérature contemporaine (Albin Michel, 1958). The New Literature, trans. Samuel I. Stone (Braziller, 1959)
- De la littérature à l'alittérature (Grasset, 1969)
- Quand le temps était mobile (Bartillat, 2008)

=== Novels ===
- Le Dialogue intérieur:
  - Toutes les femmes sont fatales (Albin Michel, 1957). All Women Are Fatal, trans. Richard Howard (Braziller, 1964); also as Femmes Fatales, trans. Henry Wolff (Calder & Boyars, 1966)
  - Le Dîner en ville (Albin Michel, 1959). The Dinner Party, trans. Merloyd Lawrence (Braziller, 1960); republished as Dinner in Town (Calder, 1963)
  - La Marquise sortit à cinq heures (Albin Michel, 1961). The Marquise Went Out at Five, trans. Richard Howard (Braziller, 1962)
  - L'Agrandissement (Albin Michel, 1963)
- Les Infiltrations de l'invisible:
  - L'Oubli (Grasset, 1966)
  - Le Bouddha s'est mis à trembler (Grasset, 1979)
  - Un cœur tout neuf (Grasset, 1980)
  - Radio Nuit (Grasset, 1982)
  - Zabé (Gallimard, 1984)
  - Trans-Amour-Étoiles (Grasset, 1989)
  - Journal d'une ombre (Sables, 1992)
- Le Fauteuil Rouge (Flammarion, 1990). Written under the pseudonym Harriet Pergoline.

=== Journals ===
- Conversations avec André Gide (Albin Michel, 1951; revised and expanded in 1990)
- Une amitié contrariée (Grasset, 1970)
- Un autre de Gaulle (Hachette, 1970). The Other de Gaulle: Diaries 1944–1954, trans. Moura Budberg and Gordon Latta (John Day, 1973)
- Le Temps immobile:
  - Le Temps immobile 1 (Grasset, 1974)
  - Le Temps immobile 2 (Les Espaces imaginaires) (Grasset, 1975)
  - Le Temps immobile 3 (Et comme l'espérance est violente) (Grasset, 1976)
  - Le Temps immobile 4 (La Terrasse de Malagar) (Grasset, 1977)
  - Le Temps immobile 5 (Aimer de Gaulle) (Grasset, 1978)
  - Le Temps immobile 6 (Le Rire des pères dans les yeux des enfants) (Grasset, 1981)
  - Le Temps immobile 7 (Signes, rencontres et rendez-vous) (Grasset, 1983)
  - Le Temps immobile 8 (Bergère ô tour Eiffel) (Grasset, 1985)
  - Le Temps immobile 9 (Mauriac et fils) (Grasset, 1986)
  - Le Temps immobile 10 (L'Oncle Marcel) (Grasset, 1988)
- Une certaine rage (Robert Laffont, 1977)
- L'Éternité parfois (Pierre Belfond, 1978)
- Laurent Terzieff (Stock, 1980)
- Qui peut le dire ? (L'Âge d'Homme, 1985)
- Le Temps accompli:
  - Le Temps accompli 1 (Grasset, 1991)
  - Le Temps accompli 2 (Histoire de ne pas oublier. Journal 1938) (Grasset, 1992)
  - Le Temps accompli 3 (Le Pont du secret) (Grasset, 1993)
  - Le Temps accompli 4 (Travaillez quand vous avez encore la lumière) (Grasset, 1996; posthumous)

=== Plays ===
- La Conversation (Grasset, 1964)
- Théâtre (La Conversation; Ici, maintenant; Le Cirque; Les Parisiens du dimanche; Le Hun) (Grasset, 1968)

== Awards and honours ==
- 1949: Prix Sainte-Beuve, for André Breton
- 1959: Prix Médicis, for Le Dîner en ville
- 1978: Prix Pierre-de-Régnier, for his body of work
- 1981: Commander of the Ordre des Arts et des Lettres
- 1984: Officer of the Order of Legion of Honour
