= Thérèse Desqueyroux (2012 film) =

2012 French drama film

- Theatrical release poster
- Directed by: Claude Miller
- Screenplay by: Claude Miller; Natalie Carter
- Based on: Thérèse Desqueyroux by François Mauriac
- Produced by: Yves Marmion
- Starring: Audrey Tautou; Gilles Lellouche
- Cinematography: Gérard de Battista
- Edited by: Véronique Lange
- Production companies: Les Films du 24; UGC Images; TF1 Droits Audiovisuels; France 3 Cinéma; Cool Industrie
- Distributed by: UGC
- Release dates: 27 May 2012 (Cannes); 21 November 2012 (France)
- Running time: 110 minutes
- Country: France
- Language: French
- Budget: $11.7 million
- Box office: $4.4 million

Thérèse Desqueyroux is a 2012 French drama film directed by Claude Miller, based on the 1927 novel of the same name by François Mauriac. The film stars Audrey Tautou and Gilles Lellouche. It closed the 2012 Cannes Film Festival, where it was screened out of competition.

== Plot ==
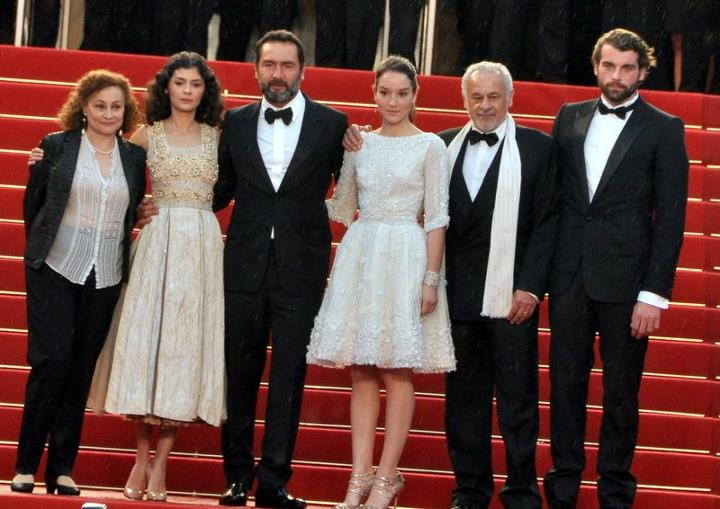
The cast at the film's premiere at 2012 Cannes Film Festival

In the south-west of France, in the late 1920s, Thérèse Laroque agrees to a marriage of convenience between wealthy families by marrying Bernard Desqueyroux, a bourgeois landowner. They then settle on his family's property, located in a vast area stretching over acres of pine forests. Bernard is a local man with a passion for hunting and defending the family traditions with conviction. However, Thérèse is quickly stifled by the monotony of her married life. She gives birth to a daughter (Marie), but her boredom seems to grow every day; she is looking "somewhere else". Bernard suffers from an unspecified condition for which he is prescribed arsenic. Thérèse takes the opportunity to attempt to poison her husband, but in forging a prescription, she is discovered. In addition to being dishonored by her own family, she is disowned by her husband's. She faces justice for the alleged murder attempt until her husband and in-laws, who intend to keep up appearances within their provincial society, make up their own version of what happened. The case is dismissed and Thérèse is confined to the house. Eventually she is allowed to leave and live in Paris on the understanding that she will only return for weddings and funerals.

== Cast ==
- Audrey Tautou as Thérèse Desqueyroux
- Gilles Lellouche as Bernard Desqueyroux
- Anaïs Demoustier as Anne de la Trave
- Catherine Arditi as Madame de la Trave
- Isabelle Sadoyan as Aunt Clara
- Stanley Weber as Jean Azevedo
- Francis Perrin as Monsieur Larroque
- Yves Jacques as Lawyer
- Alba Gaïa Kraghede Bellugi as Therese Larroque
