= Juan Pablo Ebang Esono =

Equatorial Guinean film director

- Born: June 30, 1981 (age 44); Malabo, Equatorial Guinea
- Occupation: Film director
- Years active: 2018-present
- Notable work: Teresa

Juan Pablo Ebang Esono (born 30 June 1981) is an Equatoguinean film director.

== Biography ==
Esono was born in Malabo, the capital of Equatorial Guinea, in 1981. He studied at the Nucine academy of Valencia, earning a degree in Cinematographic Directing. Esono directed his first short film, No Esta Desnuda, in January 2007. It received the prize for the best short feature in the 3rd International Film Festival for Integration in Valencia.

In 2010, Esono directed Teresa, the first medium-length film to be produced in Equatorial Guinea. Produced by the National Library of Equatorial Guinea, the plot concerns the lives of three teenage friends with different interests, including the titular Teresa. It was based on true events. After producing the film, Esono led film classes in several cities and provinces in his country on behalf of the National Library. Moviepilot.de named it the best film from Equatorial Guinea.

Esono directed the short film La familia in 2011. It received "Le grand Prix Africain du Cinema de la Television" at the Golden Crown Awards in Abidjan. In 2016, Esono directed the 21-minute film Milu, with a script written by Salvador Maquina. In September 2020, he was named General Director of Production, Programming and Compilation of Audiovisual Historical Archives.

== Filmography ==
- 2007: No Está Desnuda (short film)
- 2010: Teresa
- 2011: La familia (short film)
- 2016: Milu (short film)
