= Thérèse Desqueyroux (novel) =

1927 French novel

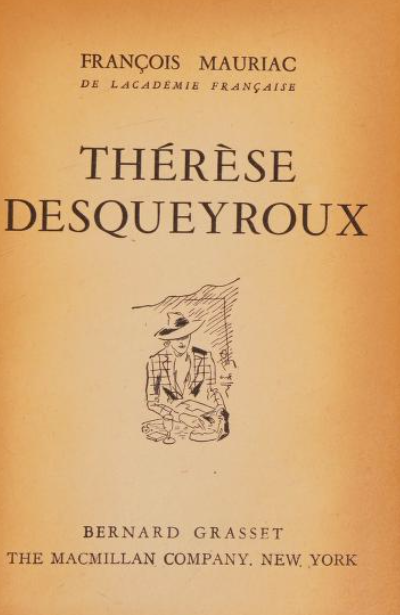
- Title page for Thérèse Desqueyroux (1927)
- Author: François Mauriac
- Translator: Gerard Hopkins
- Language: French
- Publisher: Grasset
- Publication date: 1927
- Publication place: France
- English publication date: 1928
- Media type: Print

Thérèse Desqueyroux (French pronunciation: [teʁɛz dɛskɛʁu]) is a 1927 French novel by François Mauriac.

== Plot ==
The novel is set in the Landes, a sparsely populated area of south-west France covered largely with pine forests. As it opens, a court case is being dismissed. The main character, the titular Thérèse, has been tried for poisoning her husband Bernard by overdosing him with Fowler's Solution, a medicine containing arsenic. Despite strong evidence against her, including prescriptions she forged, the case has been dropped; the family closed ranks to prevent scandal and Bernard himself testified in her defence. On the journey home, Thérèse reflects at length on her life so far, trying to understand what brought her to continue poisoning her husband after she observed him taking an accidental overdose. She suggests that her actions were part of an "imperceptible slope", caused in part by the pressures of motherhood and marriage and the stifling life of a Catholic landowner's wife in 1920s rural France. However, neither Thérèse nor the narrator provides a clear explanation for her behaviour.

== Analysis ==
Mauriac commented on the novel's structure in an interview in The Paris Review in 1953. He said: " ... in Thérèse Desqueyroux I used some devices that came from the silent films; lack of preparation, the sudden opening, flashbacks. They were methods that were new and surprising at that time".

== Development history ==
In 1925, Mauriac asked his brother Pierre for documents about the trial in Bordeaux, in 1906, of Madame Canaby, who had attempted to poison her husband. She was acquitted, but convicted of forging prescriptions.

== Literary significance and reception ==
The novel is Mauriac's best known work, and was described as "outstanding" in the biography that accompanied his Nobel Literature Prize citation.

Mauriac also attracted negative criticism. Jean-Paul Sartre famously attacked his work in 1939, accusing him of denying his characters free will and, like God, imposing external fates and moral judgements on them. He singled out the character of Thérèse Desqueyroux as an example of this; Mauriac had recently published The End of the Night, stating in its preface that he wished to "save" Thérèse, prompting Sartre's attack.

== Adaptations ==
The novel was filmed as Thérèse Desqueyroux by Georges Franju in 1962, with Emmanuelle Riva as Thérèse. Riva reprised the role in the 1966 TV film La fin de la nuit, directed by Albert Riéra.

In 2010 it was announced that Claude Miller was to remake the film, with Audrey Tautou as Thérèse.

In 2015, Nicole Garcia played Thérèse in the French TV film La fin de la nuit, directed by Lucas Belvaux.

== See also ==
- Le Monde's 100 Books of the Century
