= Akaparambu =

- village
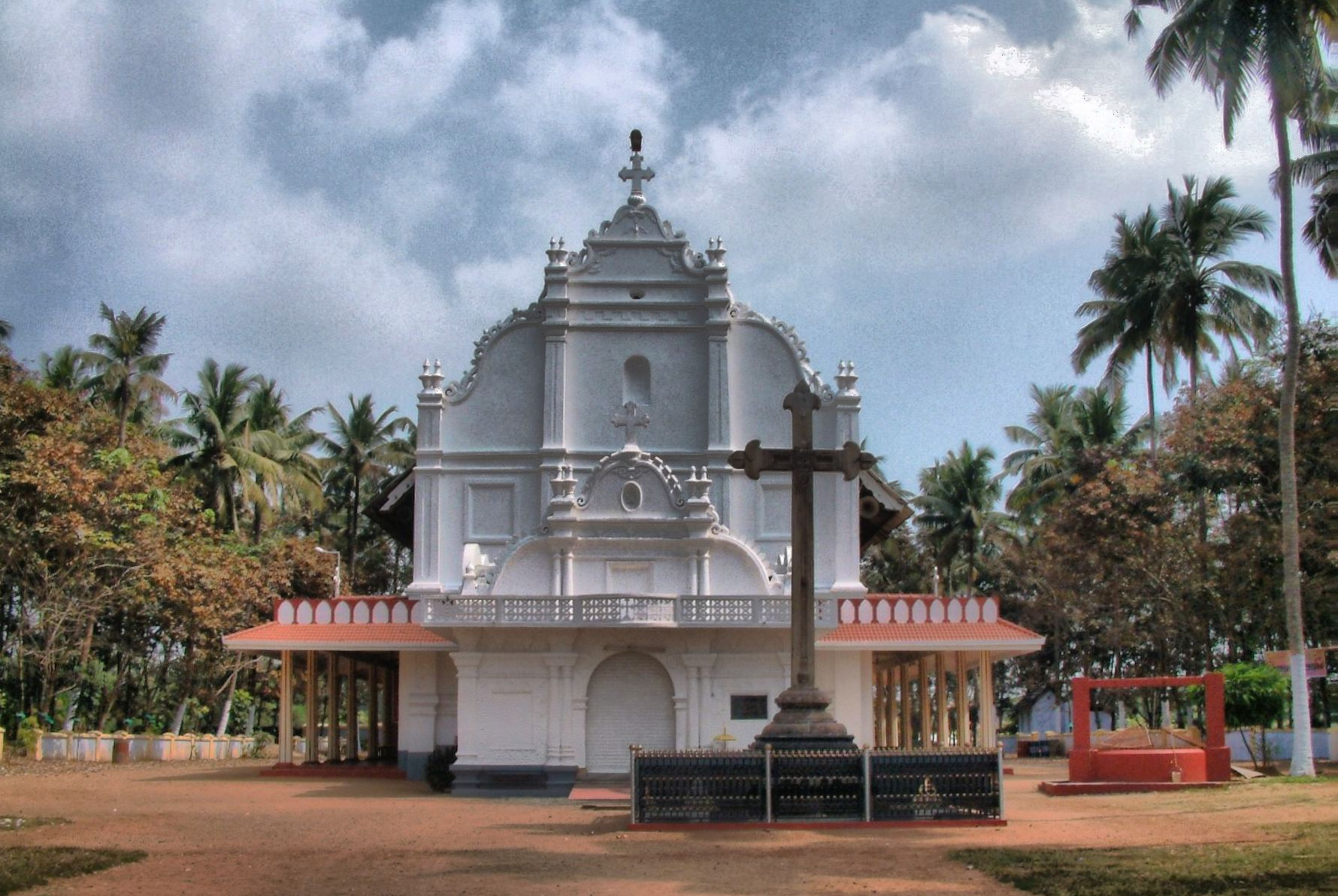
- Akaparambu Church

- Location in Kerala, India Akaparambu (India)
- Coordinates: 10.161111°N 76.373889°E
- Country: India
- State: Kerala
- District: Ernakulam
- Elevation: 0 m (0 ft)

Languages
  - Official: Malayalam, English
- Time zone: UTC+5:30 (IST)

Akaparambu, or Akapparambu is a village in the Ernakulam district of Kerala, India, near the Cochin International Airport and south of the town of Angamaly.

== History ==
Akapparambu is one of the early settlement village of Saint Thomas Christians, who migrated from Kodungallur and Aranattukara in the 9th century and they engaged mainly in Agriculture and various trades. In ancient times Akapparambu was a well known place for learning the South Indian martial art called Kalarippayattu, Astrology and Ayurveda treatment, and people from different places had visited here for learning these ancient sasthras(systems). Many of the migrated Saint Thomas Christians learnt the martial art from Akapparambu. A Saint Thomas Christian named Mathoo Chakkarayakathoottu who was a kalari acrobat trained from Akapparambu became the Akambady Nayakan of Alangadu King in 16th Century.

== Economy ==
In the past, Akaparambu was an agricultural area. The region had paddy fields and people there were engaged in rice cultivation. Now many of them work at the airport, which is less than a kilometer away. From being a quiet rural location about 15 years ago, before the airport was proposed, land has become valuable property in this region. Akaparambu and other communities in the area such as Nayathod, Vapalassery, Avanamkodu, Thuruthussery, Athani, Ernakulam and Chengamanad are seeing a rise in the price of land. Akaparambu may find itself in the heart of a full-fledged airport city ten years from now.

== Churches ==
Christianity has a long history in the region, coming here long before the religion reached Europe and other places. Tradition is that Saint Thomas the Apostle established the Syrian Church in AD 52.

=== Akaparambu Mor Sabor Mor Aphroth Church ===
This is one of the ancient churches of the Ankamaly diocese of the Malankara Jacobite Syriac Orthodox Church. In the title deed of the church and in ancient revenue and tax records the church is referred to as the Akaparambu Valiyapally. Mar Sabor and Mar Proth are said to have been two saintly men who came to Malankara to preach the Gospel with a group of Syrian Christian immigrants led by a merchant named Sapor Esho. They are said to have disembarked at Quilon (Kollam) in c. 822. The church at Akaparambu is believed to have been established in A.D. 825.

All the Patriarchs of Antioch who visited India have visited Mor Sabor and Afroth Jacobite Syrian Orthodox Cathedral.

The church is noted for its Murals, which are of great antiquity. The Malankara Metropolitan bishop St.Mor Athanasius Paulose Pynadath(1918–1953) was christened in this church. The Jacobite Bishop and educationalist Mor Gregorios Vayaliparambil Pynadath(1899–1966) belonged to this parish church. For centuries the Church at Angamaly and the Mor Sabor and Mor Afroth chapel at Akaparambu were a united parish and was administered by one council as is evident in the record of a general body meeting of 16-8-1069 (Malayalam Calendar).

=== Girvasis & Prothasis Syro-Malabar Catholic Church ===
Catholic Church at Akaparambu is situated about 1.5 km. away east of Kariyattil, near Cochin-Shornoor railway line and on Angamally-Aluva national high way. The Akaparambu Catholic Church, which is one of the twin churches, is named after twin brothers, Saints Gervasis & Prothasis, who were martyred for protecting the Christian faith. This is the only church in the patronage of these twin Saints in the Archdiocese of Ernakulam-Angamally.

A division in Catholic community was complete following the Coonan Cross Oath (Koonan kurisu Sathiyam), which took place in Mattancherry on Jan. 3, 1653. Catholic faction in Akaparambu, which showed loyalty to Rome, moved to kapela to conduct prayers. This kapela was renovated to a bigger Church later. Akaparambu church was raised to a parish by Governador Prajom Athe of Diocese of Kodugalloor on Dec. 3, 1836. Writings of Blessed Kuriakose Elias Chavara gives an account of Akaparambu Church that few priests and faithful abided to Bishop Thomarocos in 1860.Historical documents of Akaparambu show that Rev. Fr. Varu Thannickal Kodamkandathil served here as the parish priest in 1898.

Pilgrims from all walks of life visit this church throughout the year. Dumb begin to speak with the special blessings of Patron Saints. Bell and bell-rope are the main offerings at this church. There are living witnesses who were cured of depression, Stuttering, etc.

Parishes of Mattoor, Maykadu, Chengamanadu, Kavaraparampu, Neduvannoor, Nayathod, Kaprassery, Athani and Josepuram were part of Akaparambu parish and they were made independent parishes later.

== Kalari ==
The Akapparambu Kalari has a kalary temple without roof and main prathishta is headed by Lord Virabhadra. The other prathishtas in the temple are Lord Ganesha, Saraswati Bhagawati, Rekteswari and Bhuvaneswari. Kalari vidya, Astrology, mantra-tandra and Ayurveda (treatment) were the main profession of the members, who did have very deep knowledge in Sanskrit and Ayurveda. It is difficult to recruit members of the new generation to this profession.

== Eravikulangara Bhagavathi Temple ==
The Eravikulangara temple is an ancient Hindu temple dedicated to Bhagavan Shiva and Bhagavan Ayyappan. Vilwamangalam Swamiyar had 'The Darshan of Devi' (the sight of the divine) at this place, hence the Hillock where the temple is situated is also called Thiruviluam Kunnu.
