= Chengamanad =

Chengamanad may refer to:

- Chengamanad, Ernakulam district, Kerala, India.
- Chengamanadu, Kollam district, Kerala, India.
