= Chengamanadu =

Chengamanadu may refer to:

- Chengamanad, Ernakulam district, Kerala, India
- Chengamanadu, Kollam district, Kerala, India
