= Athani, Ernakulam =

Athani
- village
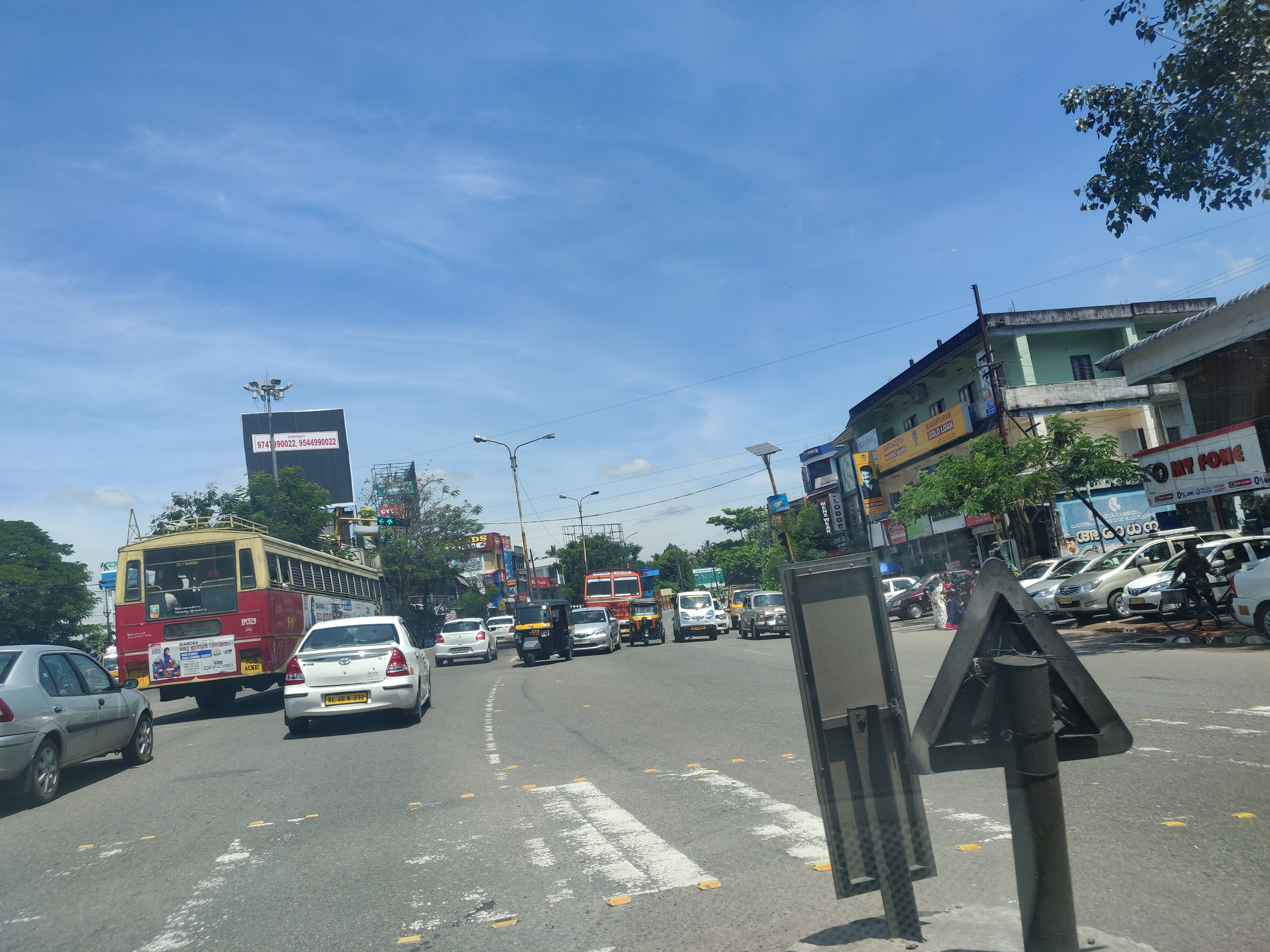
- Athani Highway Junction, Kerala, India

- Location in Kerala, India Athani (India)
- Coordinates: 10°9′19.86″N 76°21′15.94″E
- Country: India
- State: Kerala
- District: Ernakulam
- Taluk: Aluva

Government
  - Type: Panchayati raj (India)
  - Body: Gram panchayat

Languages
  - Official: Malayalam, English
- Time zone: UTC+5:30 (IST)
- PIN: 683585
- Vehicle registration: KL-63,41

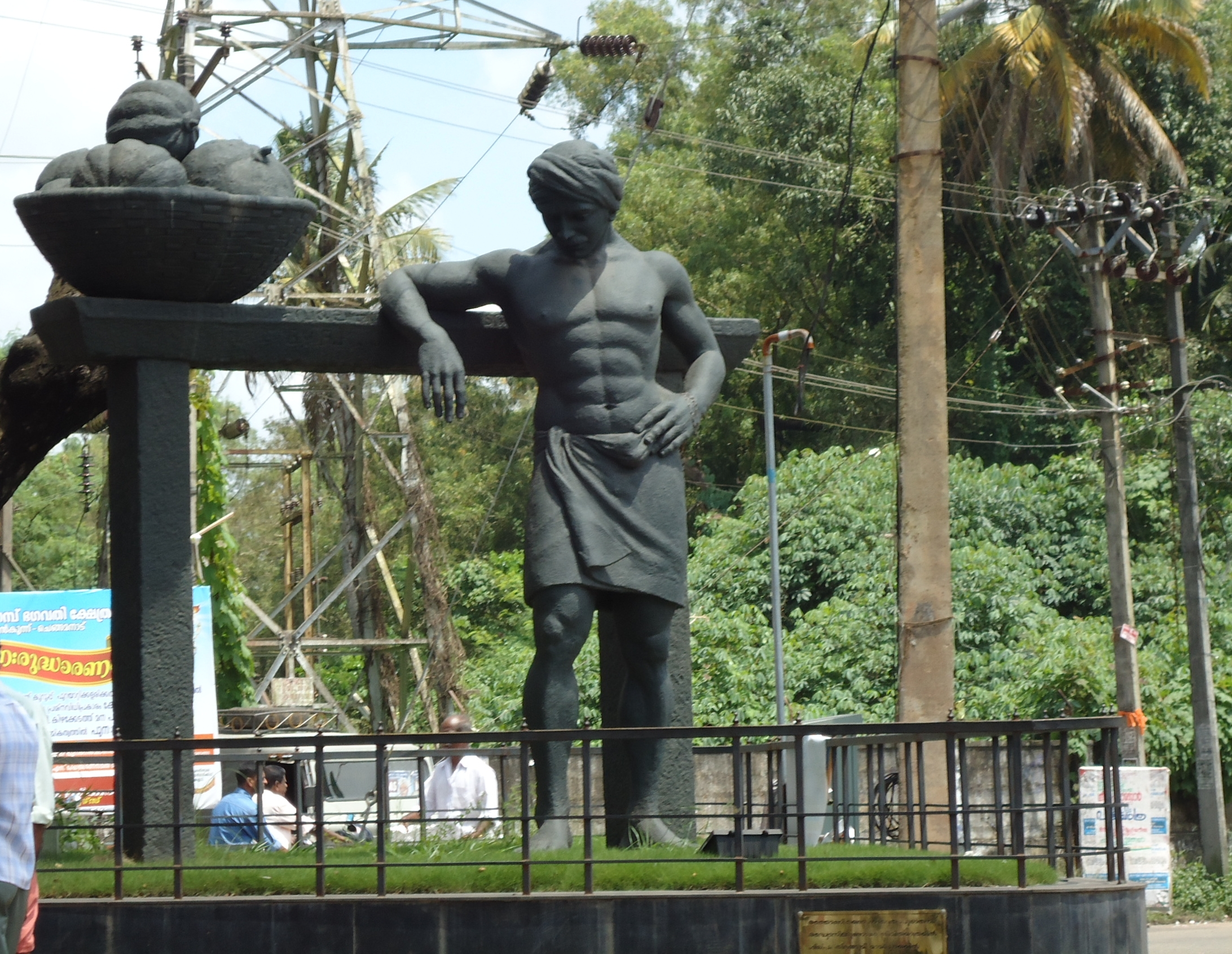
Statue at Athani Junction

Athani is a village in Nedumbasery Panchayat in Aluva Taluk. Athani is between Angamaly and Aluva in Eranakulam district in the Indian state of Kerala.

Kerala Agro Machinery Corporation Limited is situated at Athani. Kerala Ayurveda Limited have an office, factory and herb garden there. Kerala Judicial Academy is working at Athani from 2016.

== Geography ==
This village is situated in the National Highway 544. Cochin International Airport road starts from there. Athani is situated 6 km from Angamaly, 5 km away from Cochin International Airport, 8.2 km away from Aluva Town and 2.1 km away from Chengamand.

Nearby places are given below.

- Chengamanad
- Kaprassery
- Karakkattukunnu
- Mekkad
- Nedumbassery
- Neduvannoor
- Cheriya Vappalassery
- Parambayam
- Kottai

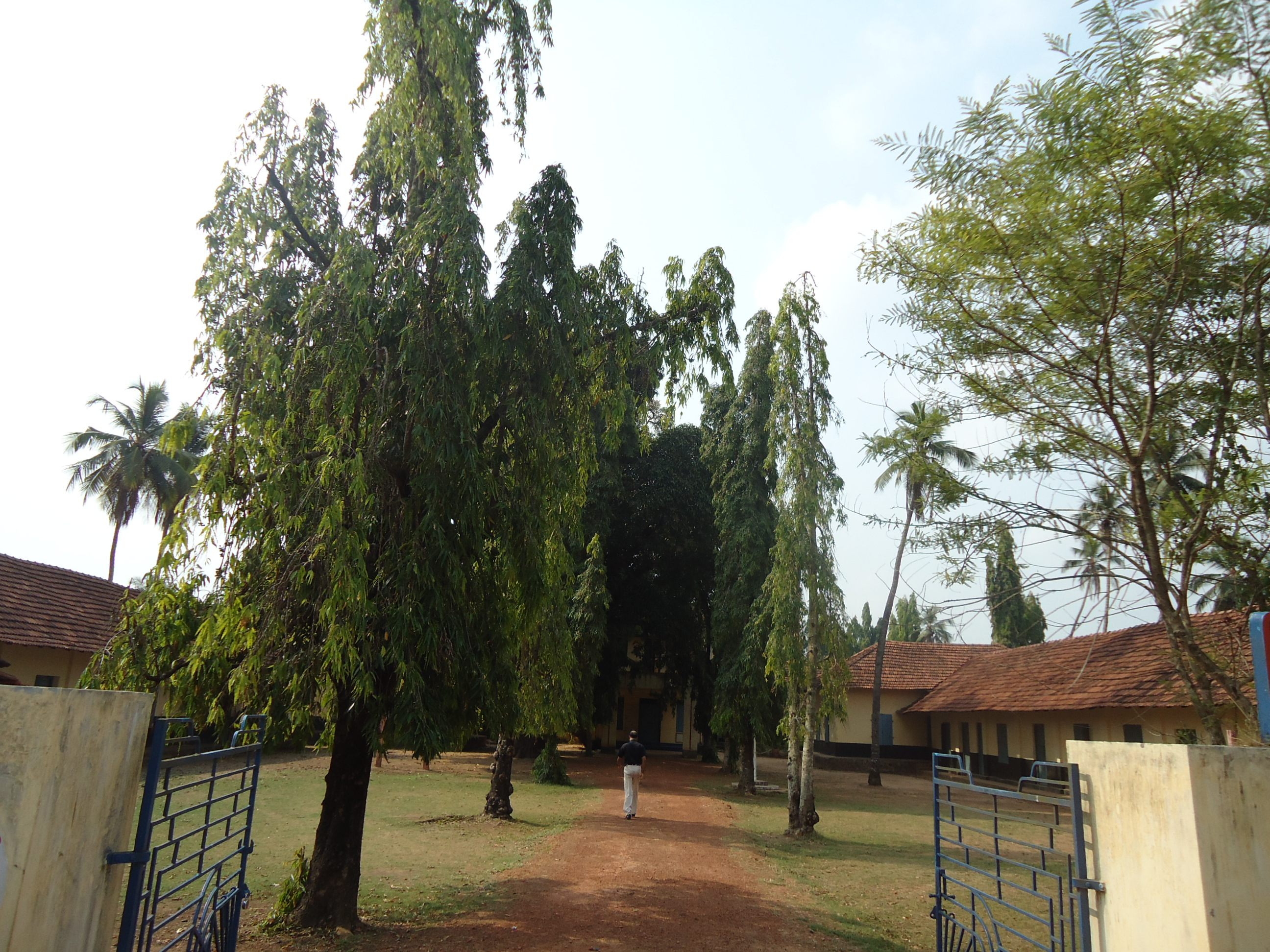
Mar Athanasius High School Athani

== Education ==
St Francis Assisi School and Mar Athanasius Higher Secondary School are the local educational institutions.

== Religion ==
=== Temples ===
- Veerahanuman Kovil
- Nedumbassery Sree DurgaDevi Temple
- Mukundapuram Sree Maha Vishnu Temple

=== Churches ===
- St. Antony's Latin Catholic Church
- St Francis Assisi Church
- St. George Jacobite Syrian Church
- St. Mary's Chapel
- The Pentecostal Mission Church
- Holy Family Convent Daughters Of Nazareth
