= Little Flower Church, Kaprassery =

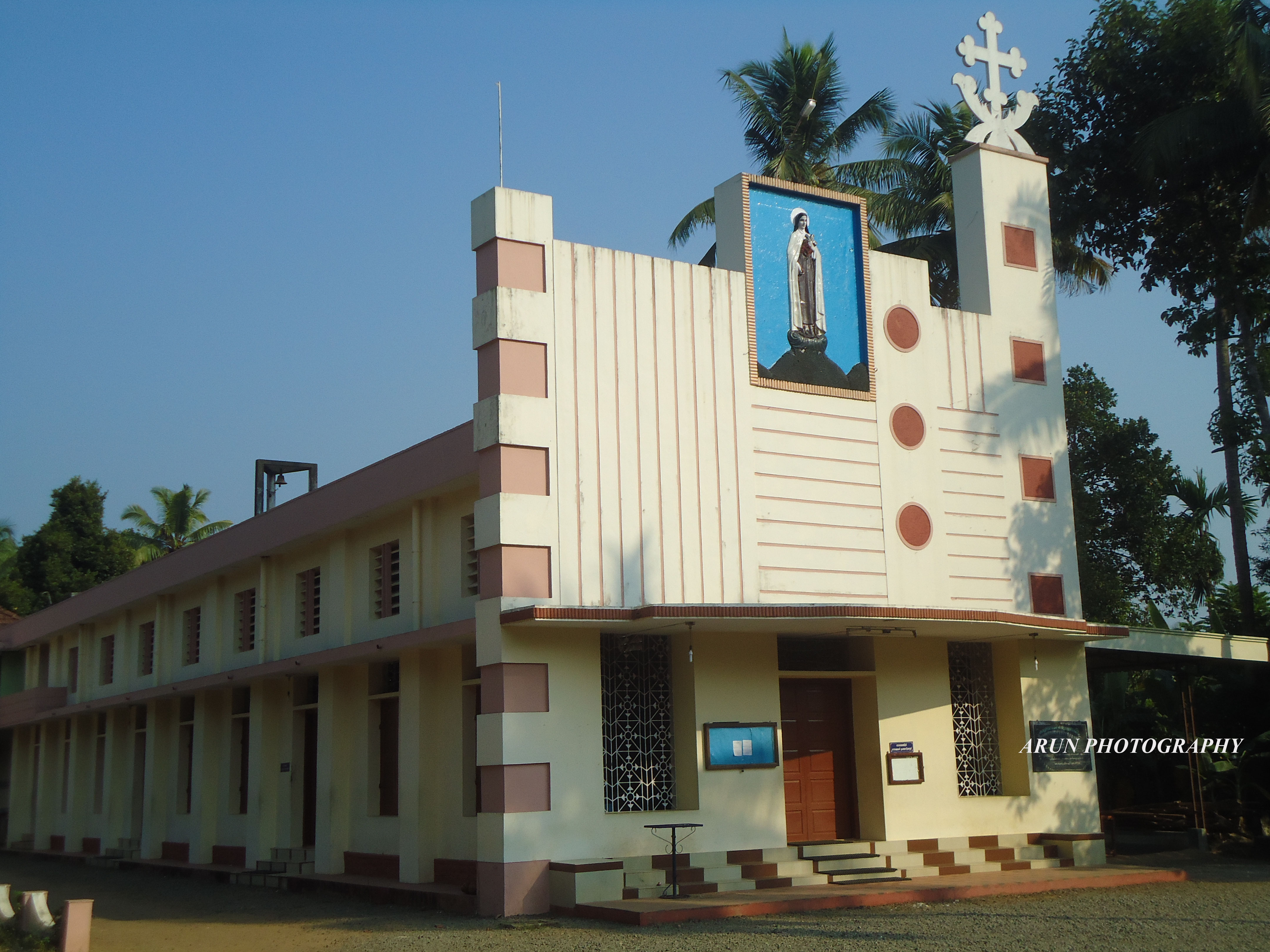
- Exterior view

Religion
- Affiliation: Syro-Malabar Catholic Church
- District: Ernakulam
- Ecclesiastical or organisational status: Filial Church
- Year consecrated: 1976

Location
- Location: Kaprassery, India
- State: Kerala
- Interactive map of Little Flower Church, Kaprassery

Architecture
- Completed: 1976
- Capacity: 990

Website
- http://www.lfck.in/

Little Flower Church, Kaprassery is a Syro-Malabar Catholic Church, in the village of Kaprassery, India, close to the Cochin International Airport. It is dedicated to Saint Thérèse of Lisieux.

== Parish ==
The Little Flower Church, Kaprassery is under the Ernakulam Angamaly Archdiocese. Rev. Fr. Paul Kottackal (Sr.) is the present vicar of the parish. He belongs to the OSH congregation and previously worked as an assistant vicar at Angamaly Basilica. There are about 230 families under the parish.

== History ==
Before this church, people from Kaprassery depended on Akaparambu Catholic Church for their religious practices. Later, as directed by the vicar of Agaparambu Church, a tutor started visiting Kaprassery to teach catechism. A chapel was built for Sunday school. Gradually, it became a Christian religious center with a small group of people from Kaprassery surrounding areas. With the arrival of Fr. James Chaveli, a new church was constructed in 1976 at the center of the village. It was named Little Flower Church after Saint Therese of Lisieux (known as the Little Flower).

== Organisations and activities ==
Catechism classes are conducted for all students from first standard and 12th standard; they are affiliated to Department of Catechises and Moral Education of Ernakulam Angamaly Archdiocese. These students are divided into six sections (pre-communion, communion, post-communion, pre-confirmation, confirmation and youth). There are more than 250 students in catechism classes. There are about ten teachers.

The Kerala Catholic Youth Movement Kaprassery Chapter (K.C.Y.M.) is a chapter of a state level youth organization which focuses on empowerment of Catholic youth, with the goal of connecting youth culture and spiritual values. The organization takes an active part in all parish activities and cultural programs conducted by the Church.

The parish hosts a chapter of the Society of St. Vincent de Paul.

The CMC Udhayabhavan convent is the only religious house that comes in the Little Flower Church boundary, run by their CMC sisters. This house is under the Andhra Province of CMC sisters and is considered as a transit house due to the closeness to the International airport, railway stations and bus terminals.

== Events ==
The parish fiesta is celebrated every first weekend of February in honour of Saint Therese of Lisieux and Saint Sebastian, preceded by a novena and mass. The activities are set through the leadership of the parish priest and the parish fest committee.

The Onanilavu is an annual cultural show organised by the K.C.Y.M., as a part of Onam celebrations, organised at Little Flower Church Parish Hall.

== Gallery ==
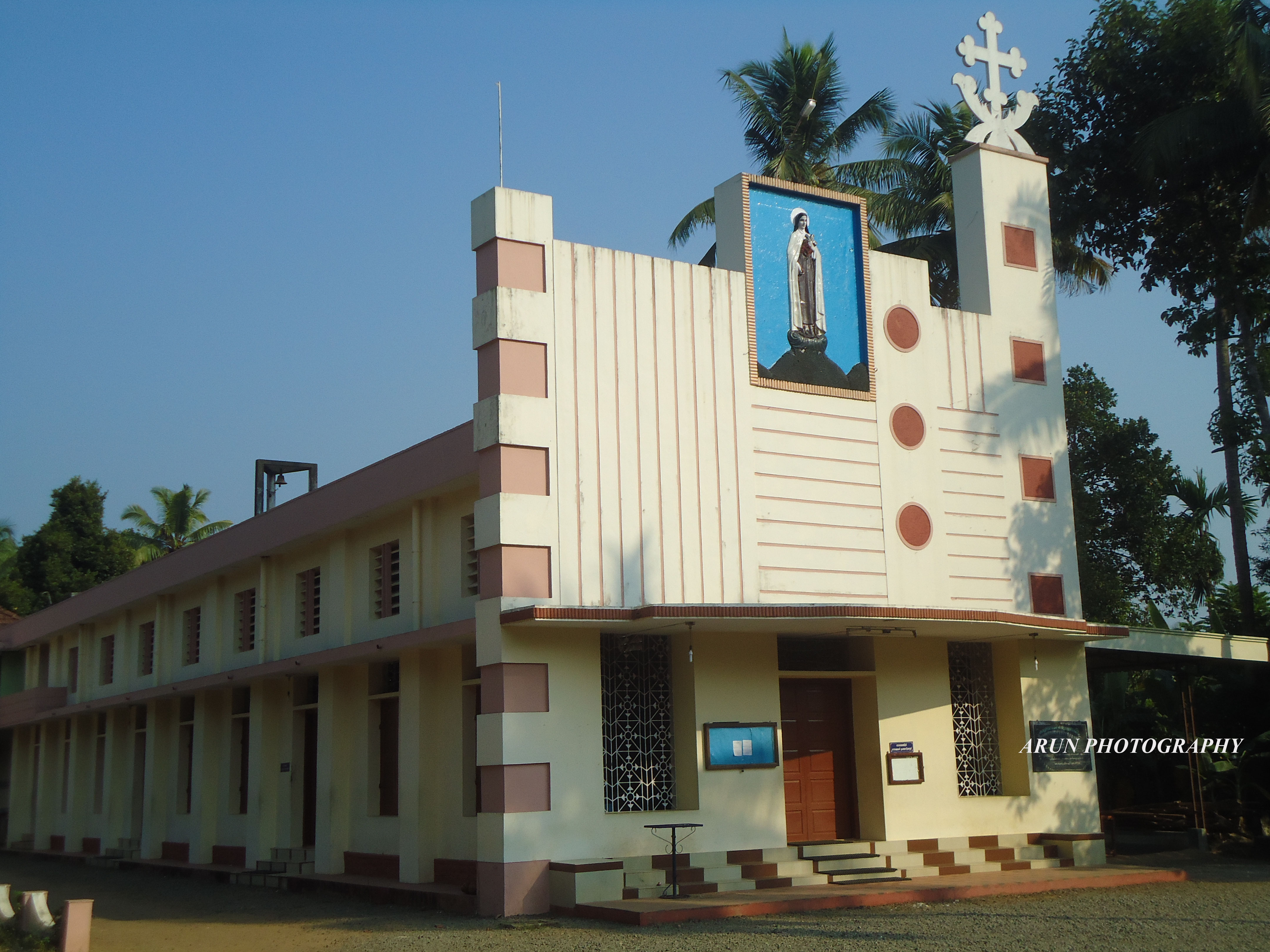
Little Flower Church, Kaprassery

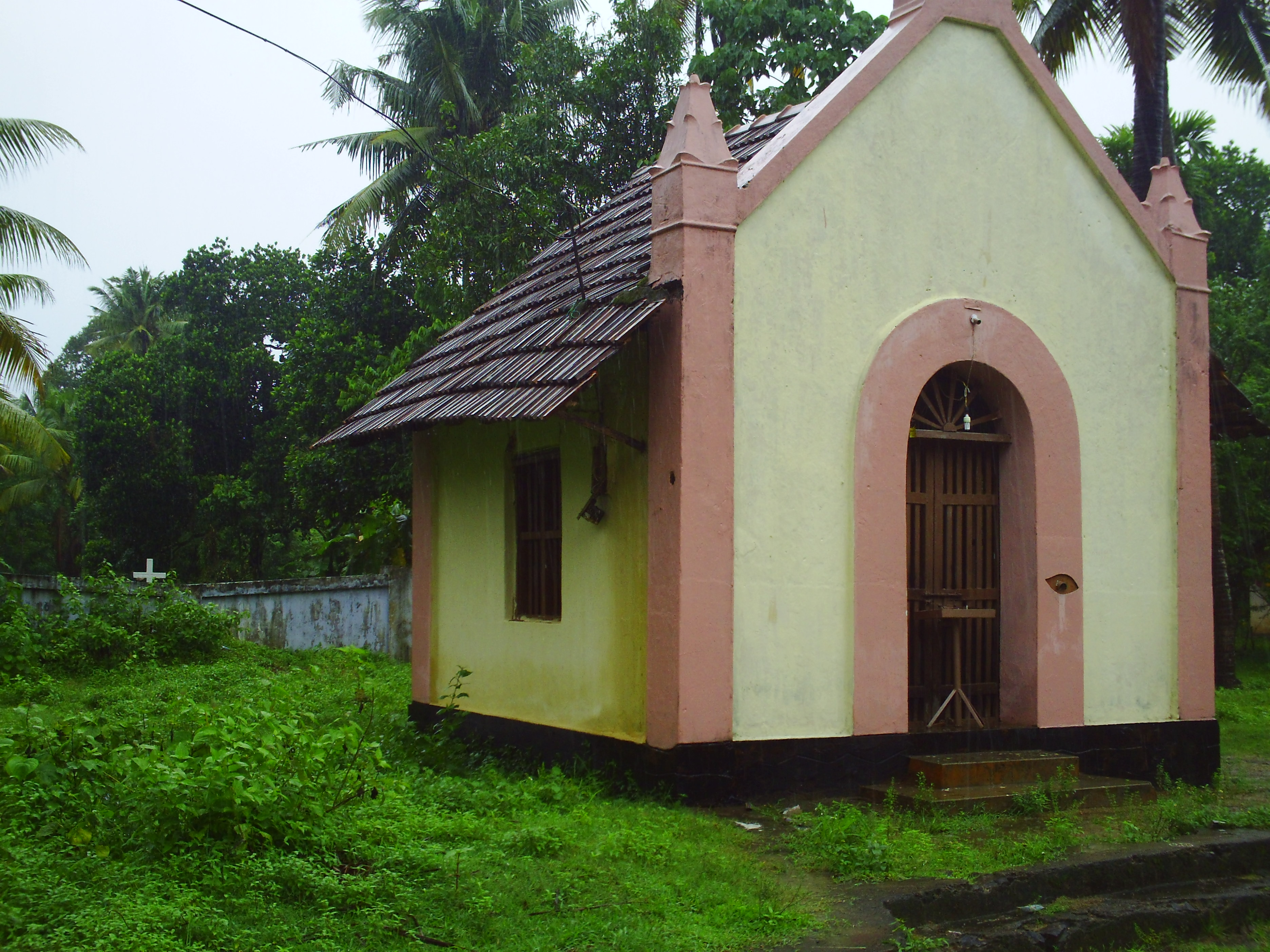
Old Cemetery Chapel

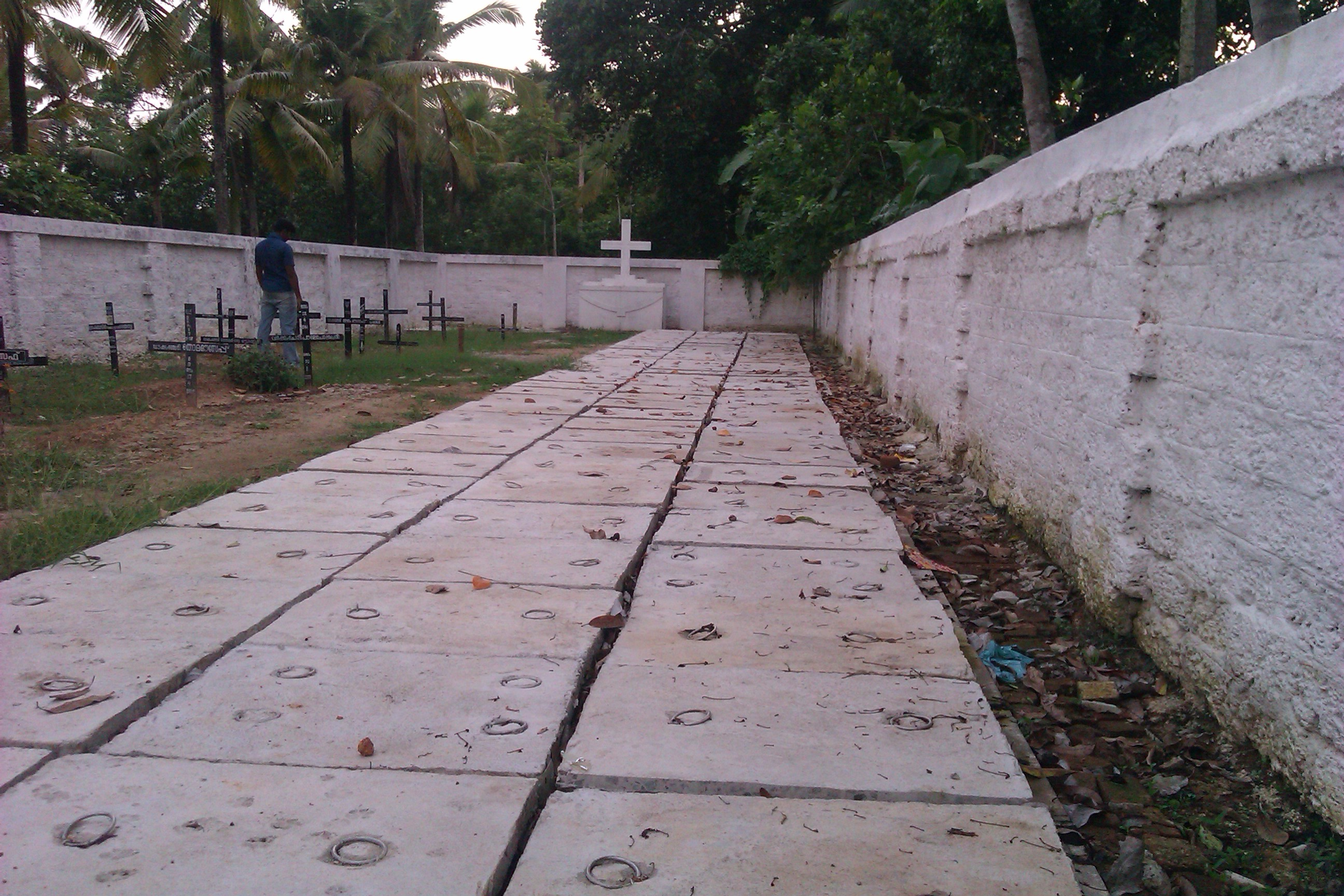
Parish Cemetery

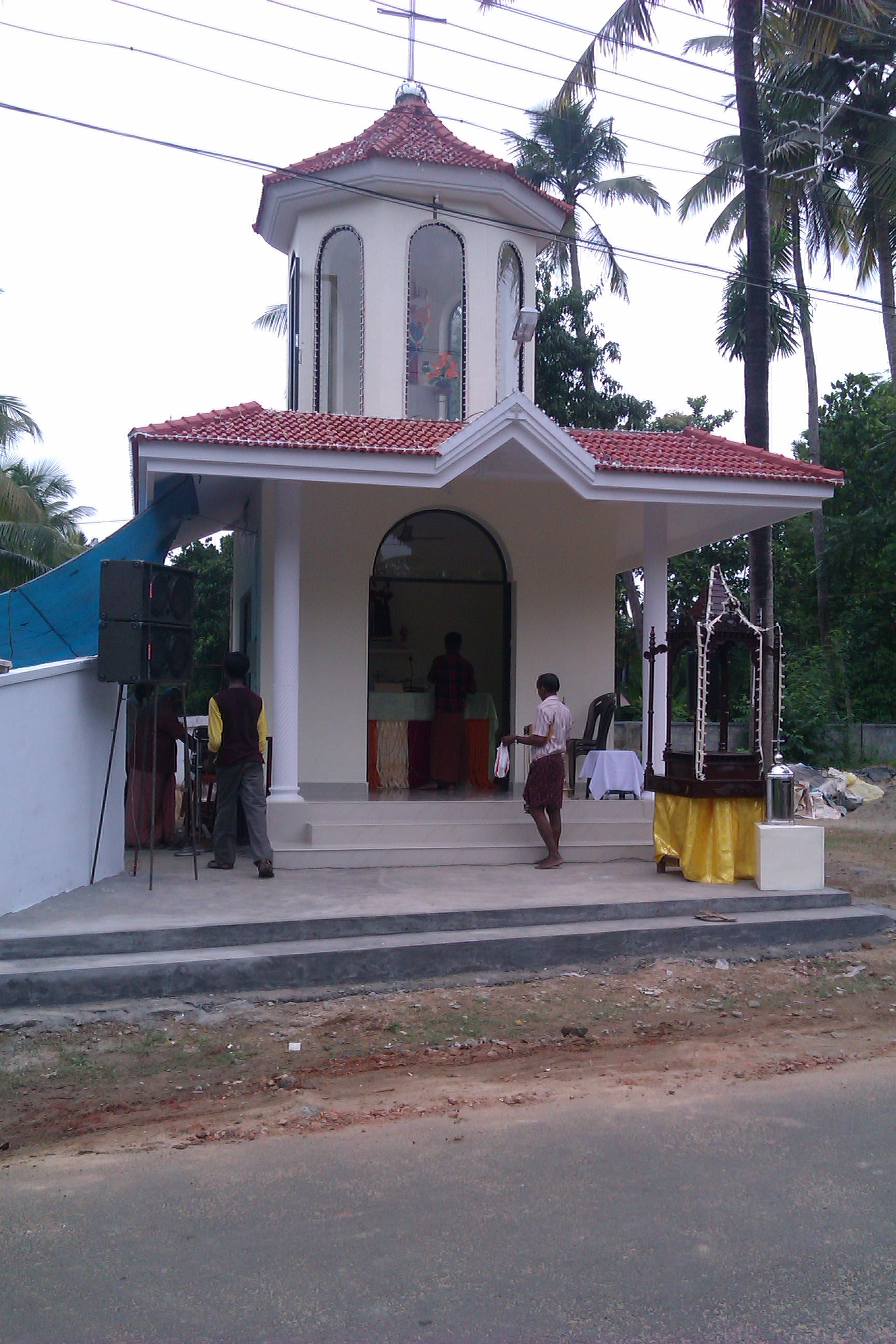
Reconstructed Cemetery Chapel

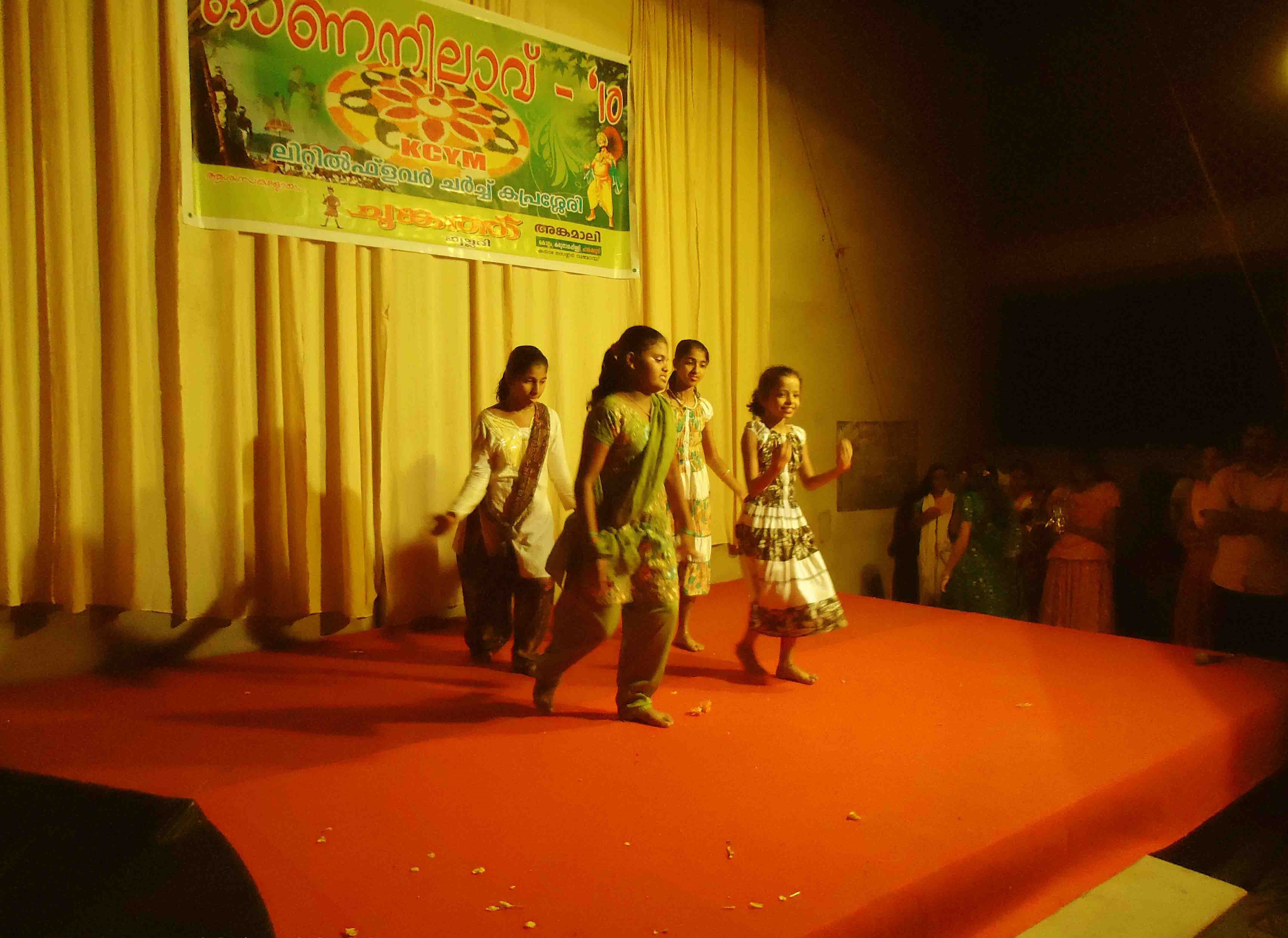
Dance Performance, Onanilavu 2010
