= Eravikulangara Temple =

Hindu temple in Kerala, India

- Eravikulangara Bhagavathy Temple, Akaparambu, Ernakulam, Kerala

Religion
- Affiliation: Hinduism
- District: Ernakulam
- Deity: Bhagavathy

Location
- Location: Akaparambu
- State: Kerala
- Country: India
- Interactive map of Eravikulangara Temple
- Coordinates: 10.161169°N 76.374109°E

Specifications
- Temple: One
- Elevation: 32.5 m (107 ft)

Eravikulangara Bhagavathy Temple is an ancient Hindu temple in the Ernakulam district of Kerala, India, dedicated to Bhagavan Sivan and Bhagavan Ayyappan.

== Location ==
The temple is situated in the village of Akaparambu, between Kalady (the birthplace of Adi Sankara) and Aluva. The temple is almost a kilometer away from the Nedumbassery International Airport and 500 meters away from the Kariyad Junction at NH47.

== Prathistha (Origin) ==
The Ashtamangalya prasna conducted here has revealed that the temple is around 1600 years old. It is also understood from the prasna that ages back the temple was amidst a dense forest and presence of Devi was found here. Vilwamangalam Swamiyar had 'The Darshan of Devi' (the sight of the divine) at this place, hence the hillock where the temple is situated is also called Thiruviluam Kunnu.

The presence of Lord Shiva and Sastha (Ayyappan) were also found later on and devotees started to worship them too. A Thambula Prasna was conducted in the year 2007. It has emphasized the need of Prathishta of Brahma Rakshas and Nāga Sarppam in the temple premises and it is done with thanthric rituals in October 2008

== Aitihya (Legends) ==
There are various aitihya told about this temple.

- A Brahmachari Brahman scholar in the nearby Padappa Mana, known as Sankara Sarma, was worshiping Bhadrakali in his Illam. When he wanted to go for Sanyasa, he performed prathishta of Bhadrakali in this temple and left for Kasi. The goddess has become so powerful due to the prana prathishta done by this Acharya.
- Old timers have been reminiscing many legendary events about this sacred temple. One of them is about a ‘Divine light’ that was seen in the dense forest on the bank of the lake by the villagers who went to graze their cattle. The news had spread " Aa parambil adbhudam!!!". This land was later known as Akapparambu. People started worshiping the divine presence there, which later on transformed as this temple.
- Once two youths were enacting as Bhadrakali and Darika. During the play both of them had the presence of Devi and Asura in them. The play went on and Devi chopped the head of Darika. His body and head had become two rocks and these rocks still exist near the temple. These are called as "Darika Para".
- One more story is told about these rocks. There was a washerwoman (Velathy) who used to wash clothes regularly in the lake. One day when she had more clothes to wash, she was worried since it was about to be dusk. She took a twig and stuck it in the ground and prayed that sun should not cross the stick before she completed her washing. When Lord Soorya became still, Devi realized it. Devi cursed that woman and she along with her cloth bundle became two rocks. Hence the same rocks are also called as "Velathy Kallu". The big lake, which is at the south side of the temple, has good significance as per the aitihya and is maintained as it was.

== See also ==
- Temples of Kerala
