= Chengamanadu, Kollam district =

Chengamanadu
- village
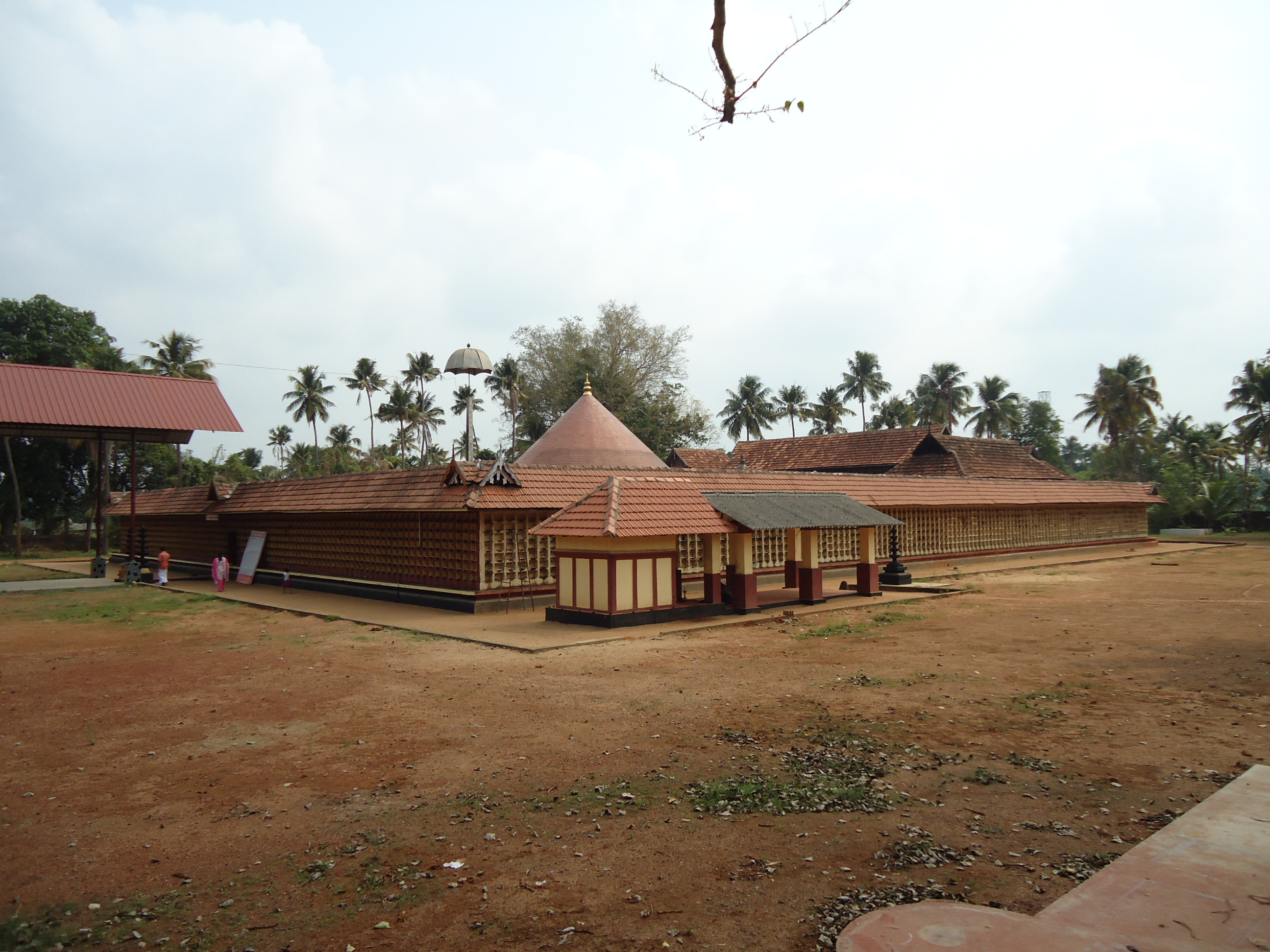
- Mahadeva Temple
- Interactive map of Chengamanadu
- Coordinates: 9.013994°N 76.825616°E
- Country: India
- State: Kerala
- District: Kollam

Languages
  - Official: Malayalam, English
- Time zone: UTC+5:30 (IST)
- Postal Index Number: 691557
- Area code: +91-474
- Vehicle registration: KL-24

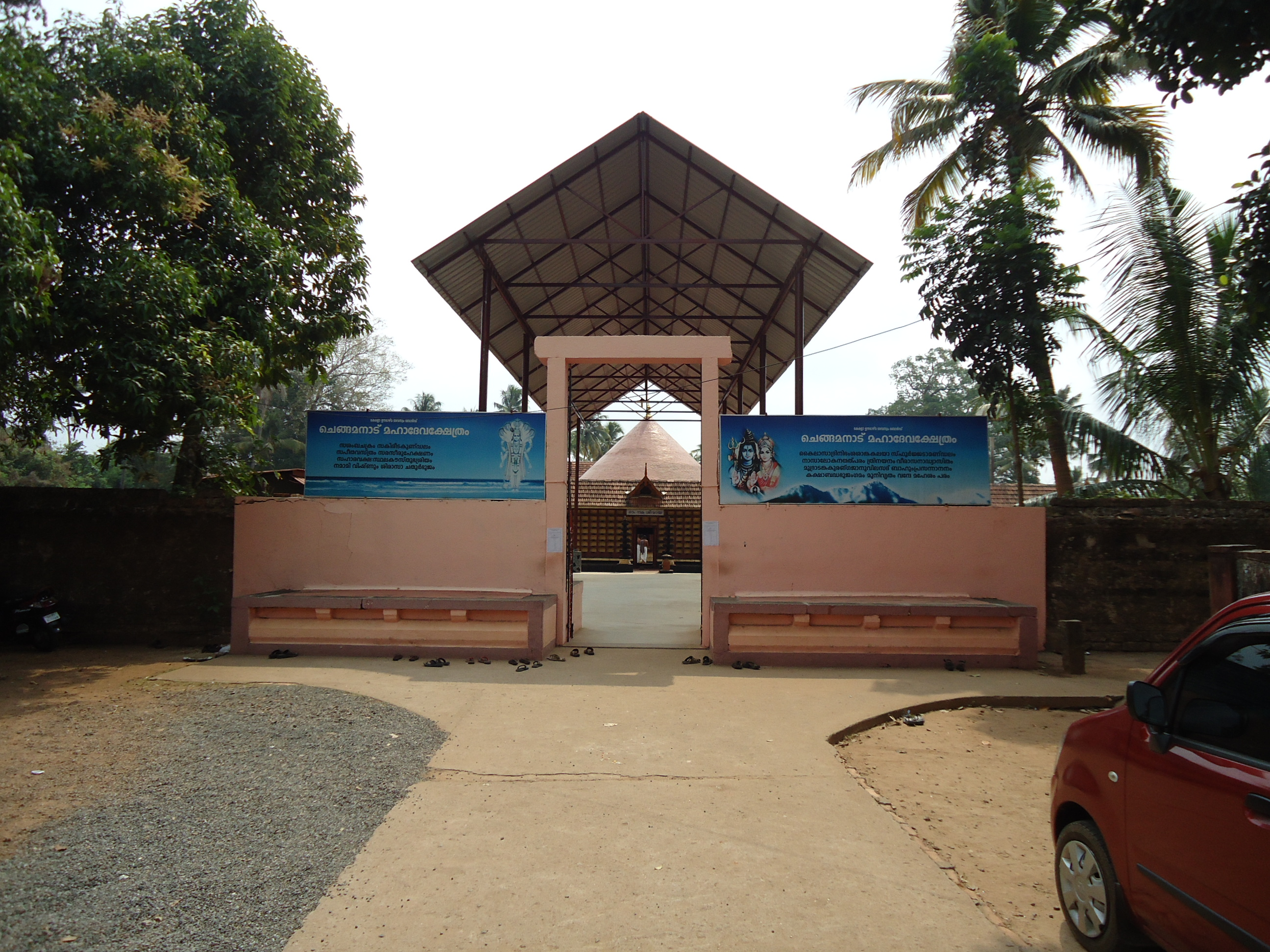
Chengamanadu Temple

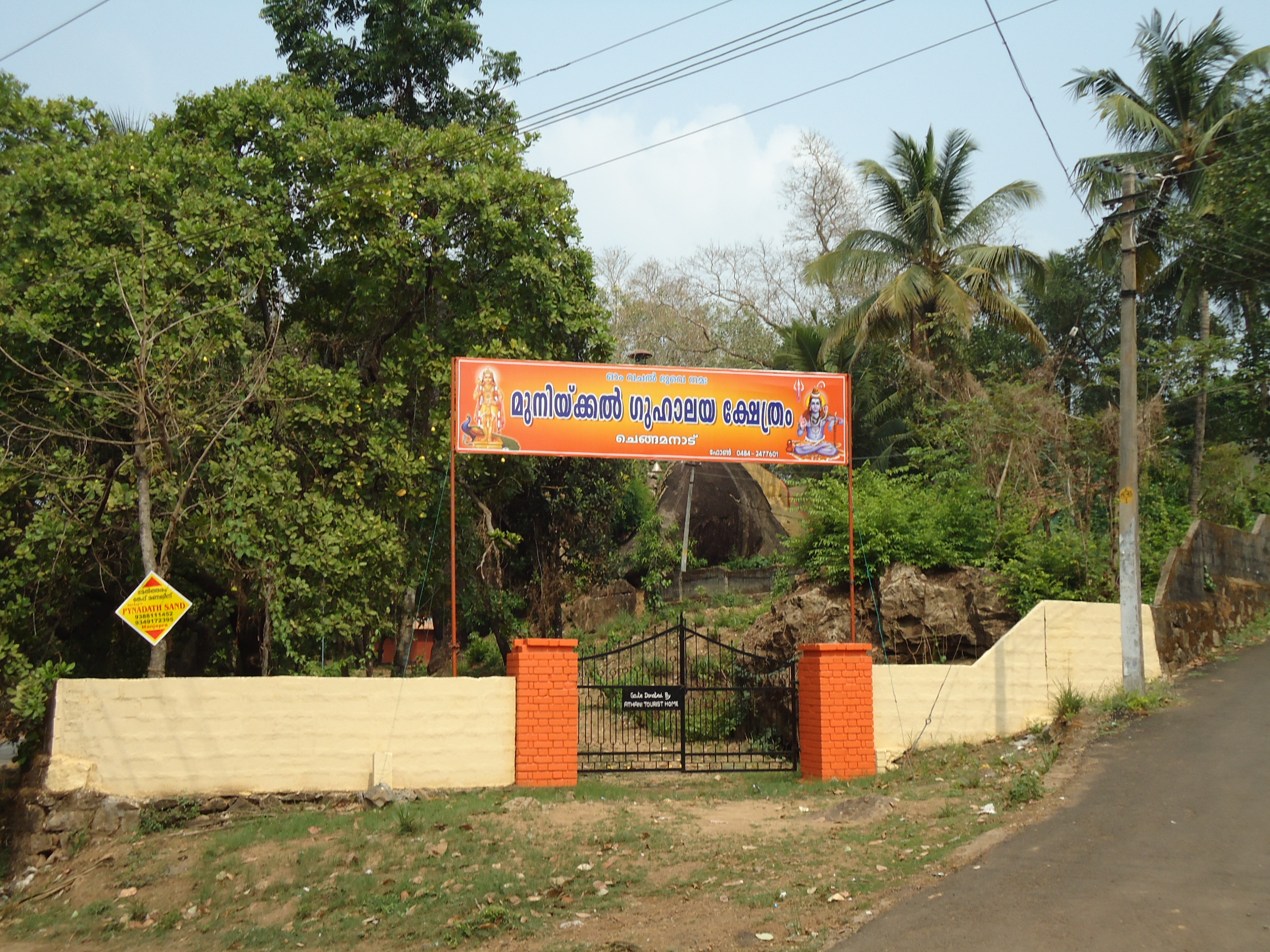
Guhalaya temple

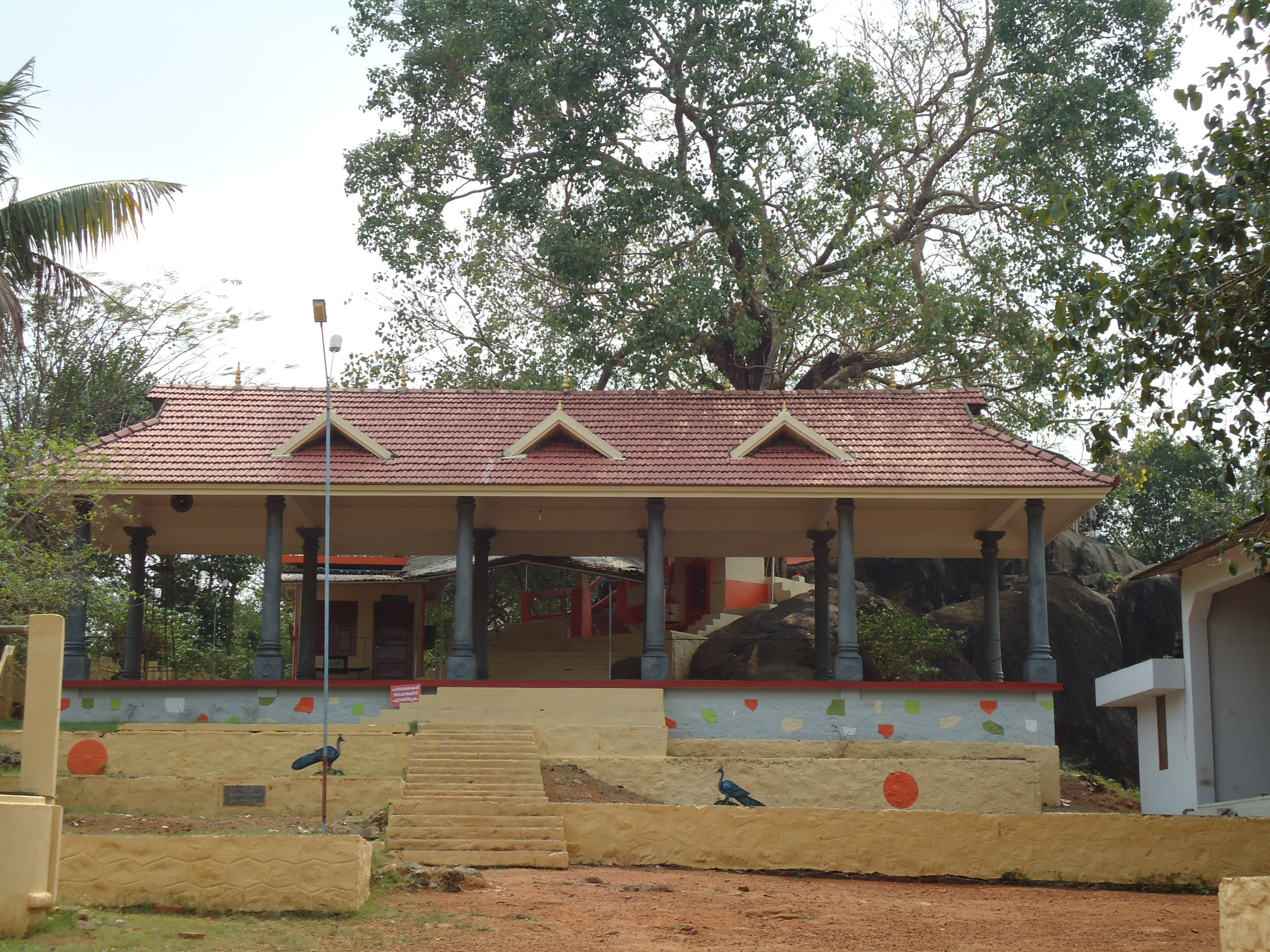
Cave temple

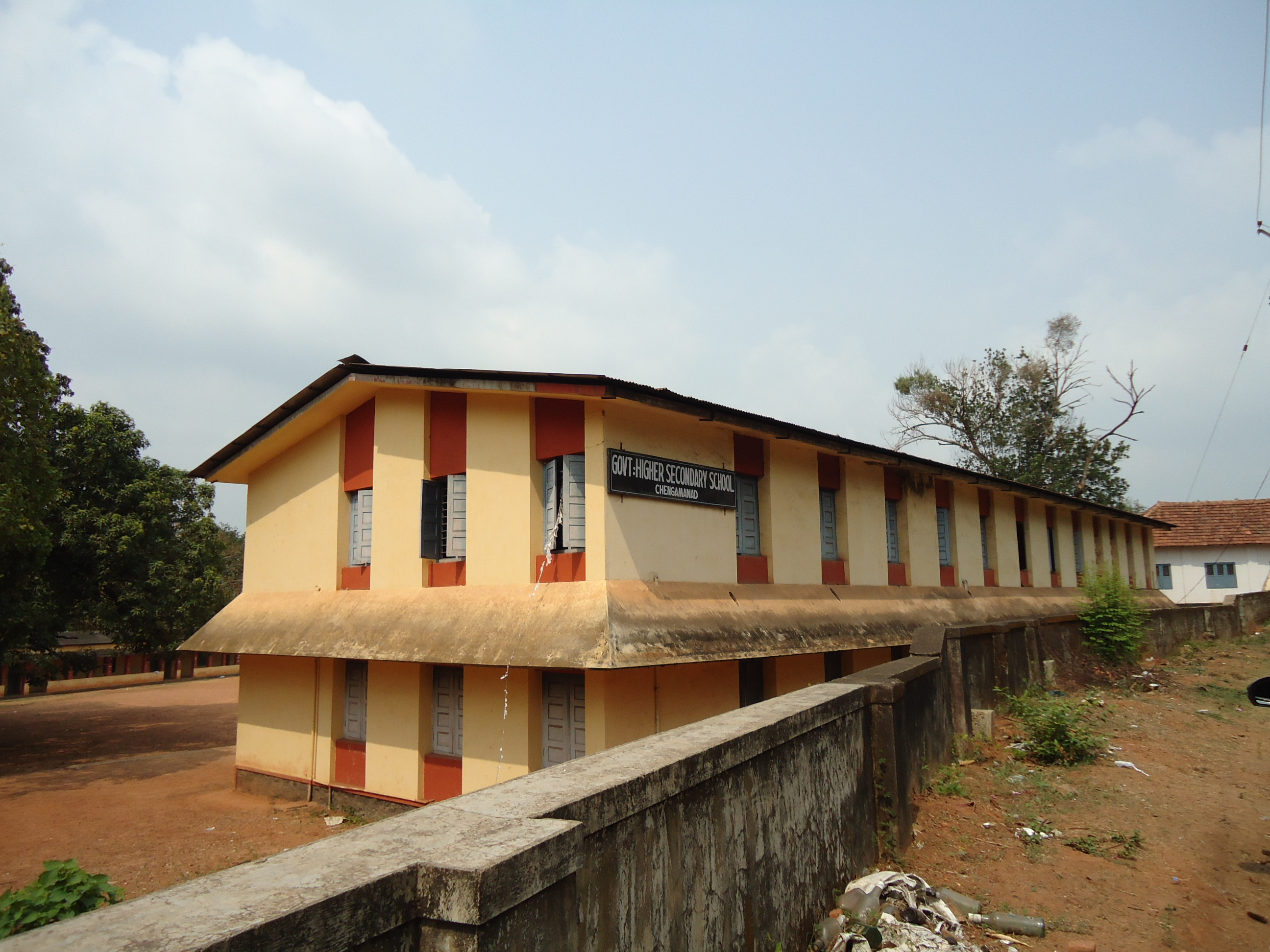
Government Highschool

Chengamanadu is an Indian village in Kollam District of Kerala state.

== Etymology ==
An age old legend about the origin of the name Chengamanadu goes like this: A prince of the then Desinganadu Kingdom went to Arabia and fallen in love with an Arabian beauty. He managed to elope with her back to his home land. But the girl's father traced their location and followed them to take her back. Knowing his arrival the lovers decided to leave the place and started off to Tamil Nadu via Aryankavu route in a single bullock ridden cart. On their way when they reached our place it was becoming heavily dark and the area was then a dense forest. There they met one woman named "Nangamma", she gave them refuge in her house to spend the night. The next day morning they continued their journey. After a long time the Prince has returned to meet Nengamma who has given him shelter, but could not meet her. Through the Prince, the forest land of Nangamma came to be known as "Nangammakadu" and later in the current form Chengamanadu.

Chengamanadu is located 5 km from Kottarakara. Bethlahem Ashram, "Villoorpally" and Vettikkavala Sree Mahadevar Temple, Assembly of God Church are some of the places of worship. A panchayathu office, village office, agricultural office, veterinary hospital, mini-stadium, YMCA, and a hospital are situated at heart of Chengamanadu.

== Offices ==
- Panchayathu office
- Village office
- Krishi Bhavan
- Veterinery hospital
- YMCA
- Y's Men's Chengamanadu Town Club

== Educational institutions ==
- MTMM LP School
- Chethady UPS
- MAMHS
- B R M Central School
- Mar Pelexinous Memorial ITC
- Govt Model Higher Secondary School

== Churches and temples ==
- St. Mary's Orthodox Syrian Church [Villoorpally]-Villoor, Chengamanadu
- Assembly of God Church, Chengamanadu
- Vettikavala Sree Mahadevar Temple

== Nearest cities and towns ==
1. Kottarakara - 5 km
2. Kollam - 32 km
3. Punalur - 12 km

== Industries ==
- CAPEX Cashew Factory
- Cashew Factory of Cashew Development Corporation

== See also ==
- Kottarakkara
