= Kaprassery =

Kaprassery Kapprassery
- Rural, Village
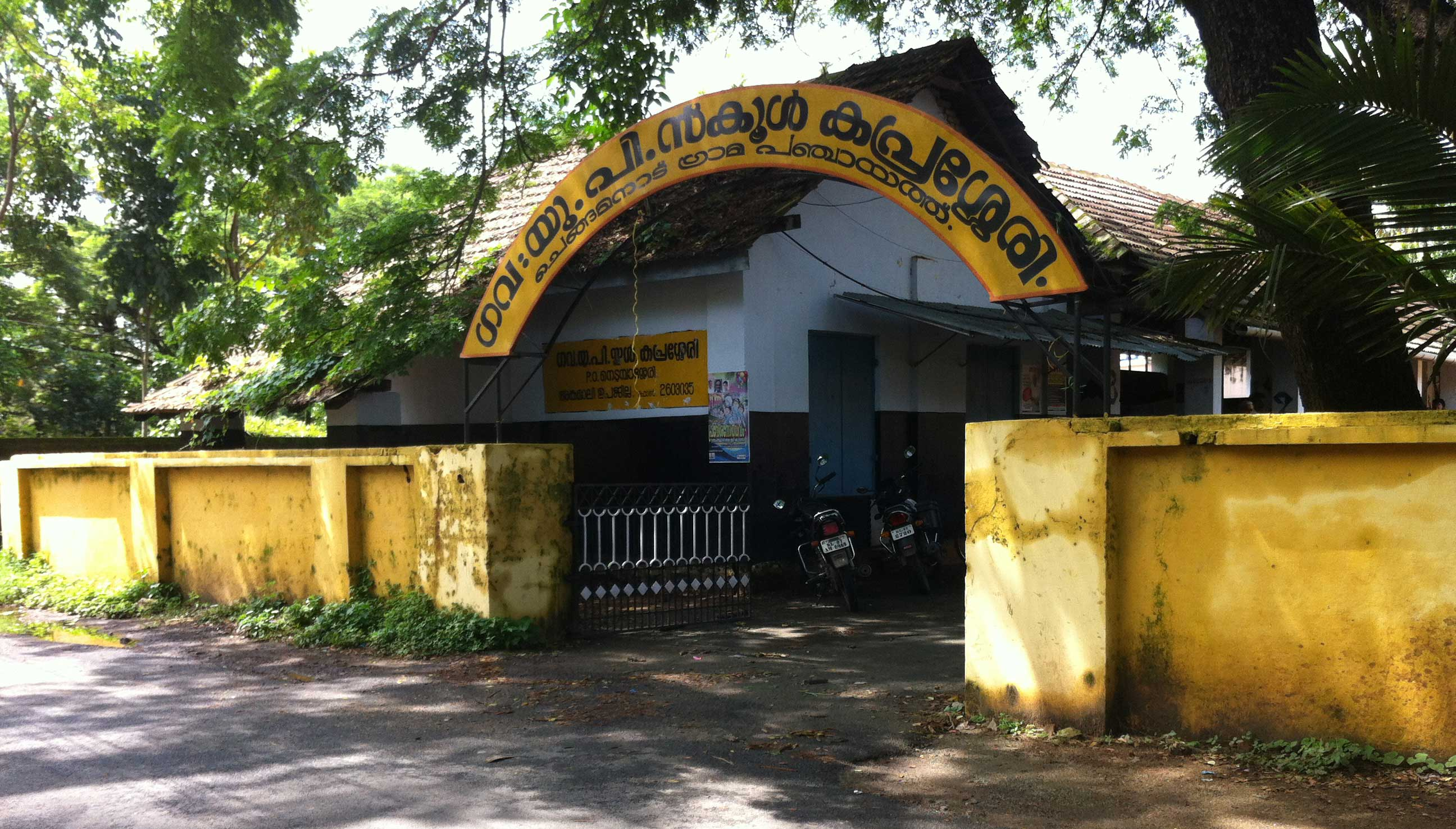
- Govt. UP School, Kaprassery
- Interactive map of Kaprassery
- Coordinates: 10.141419°N 76.361822°E
- Country: India
- State: Kerala
- District: Ernakulam

Population (2001)
  - Total: 2,000 approx.
- Demonym: Kaprasserian

Languages
  - Official: Malayalam, English
- Time zone: UTC+5:30 (IST)
- PIN: 683585
- Telephone code: 0484
- Vehicle registration: KL-41
- Sex ratio: 0.9689 ♂/♀
- Website: www.kaprassery.com

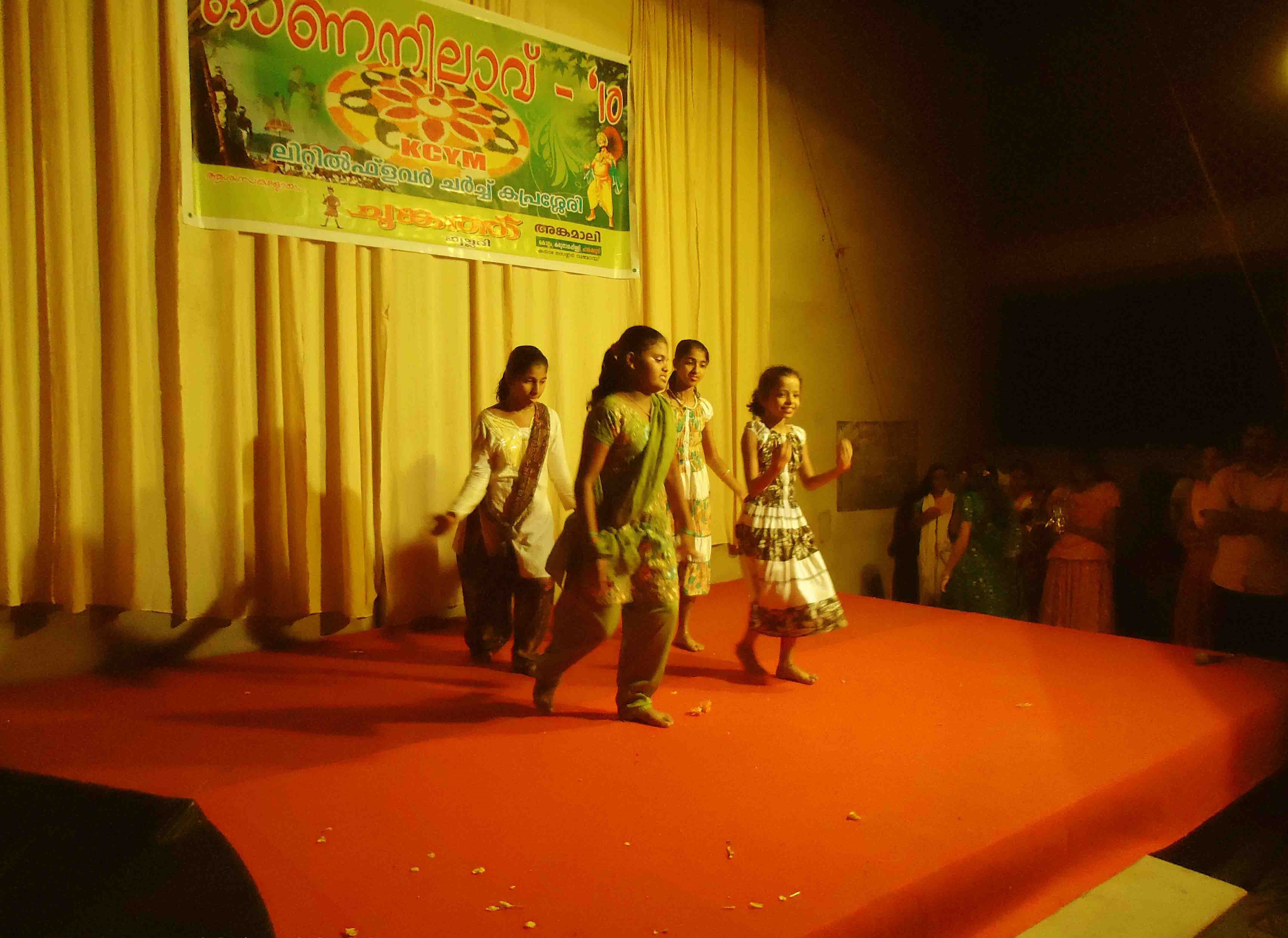
Onam celebration

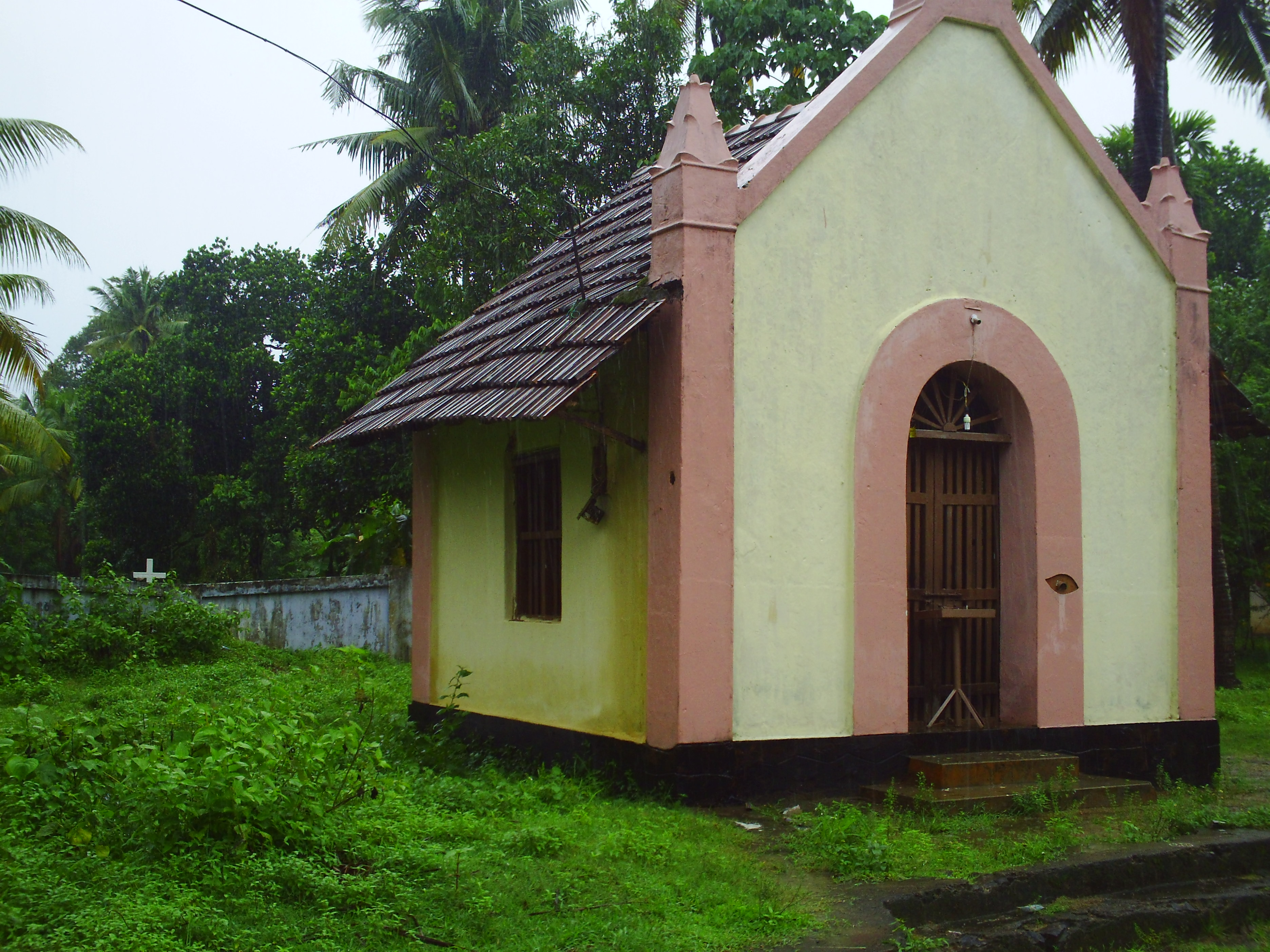
Old chapel

Village footpath

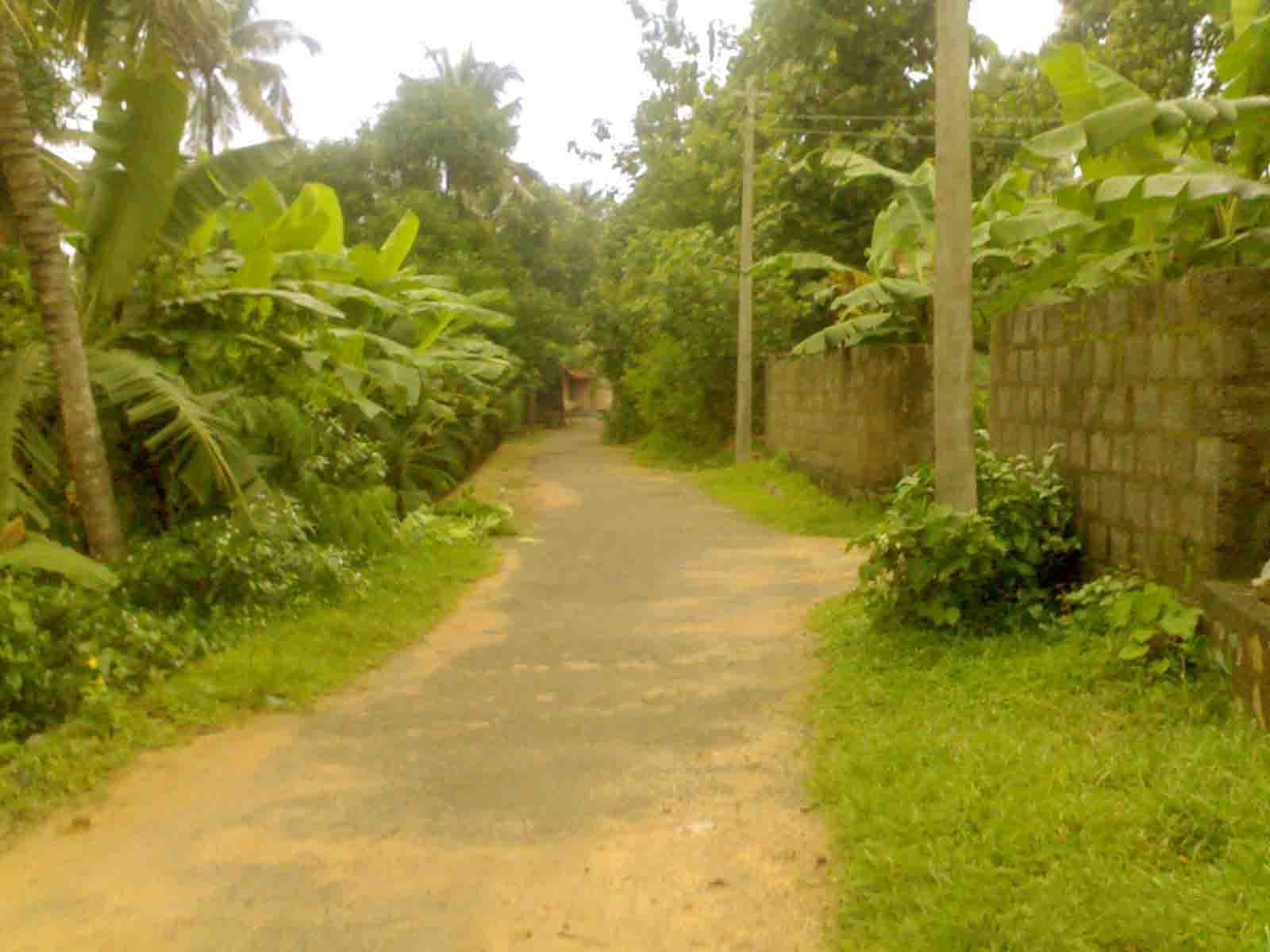
village view

Kaprassery is a village in the district of Ernakulam and is situated on the National Highway 544 (India) (Old NH47) that stretches from Salem to Kochi. It is located between the two major towns of the Indian state Kerala, namely, Aluva and Angamaly.

== Overview ==
This village is in the state of Kerala, India. It connects the arterial roads connecting Alwaye, Angamaly, Kalady, Cochin Airport and Kanjoor.

Model Technical Higher Secondary School, Kaprassery, forms a major landmark in the village. Sree Krishna temple is one of the major temples in Kaprassery. Cherikkandakkavu Bhagavathy temple and Kuruvappallam Vanadurga temple are also situated here. Little Flower Church, Kaprassery was established in the year 1976 and it is in the heart of the village. Cochin International Airport is about 4 km and the Aluva Railway Station is 7 km away from Kaprassery.

== Parish ==
The Parish was established in the year 1976. It is named Little Flower Church after the Saint Therese of Lisieux (LittleFlower). Kaprassery celebrates its parish fiesta every first weekend of February in honour of her patroness Saint Therese of Lisieux and of Saint Sebastian. This weekend is preceded by nine days and evening novena and holy mass. These days, the people of Kaprassery offer their prayers, thank the blessings granted upon their family and nation by their God with the intercession of our Lady. The celebration is considered blessed and has become more significant in the parish church which has been the centre of the life of the local residents. By the end of the ninth day, folks decorate the frontage of their house and village roads with tender coconut leaves and with the plantain trunk. Soon the weekend arrives and celebration begins by hosting papal flag in front of the church, followed by holy mass.

== Sree Krishna Temple ==
Sree Krishna Temple is a temple in Kaprassery. Kaprasserians celebrate the festival of Sree Krishna as the Thiruvulsavam of Sree Krishna temple.

=== Onanilavu ===
It is an annual cultural show that used to be organized by Kerala Catholic Youth Movement Kaprassery Chapter (K.C.Y.M.), as part of Onam celebrations. It was a platform for all the Kaprasserians to showcase their talents and also to be a part of the delicious cultural fiesta. It is organised at Little Flower Church Parish Hall.

== Transport ==
The nearest airport is Cochin International Airport.

Nearby railway stations include Aluva Railway Station and Angamaly Railway Station.

Kaprassery is also connected to Aluva, Angamaly, and Kalady by Kerala State Road Transportation and many privately owned transport buses.
