= Neduvannoor =

- Village
- Location within Kerala
- Coordinates: 10.138992°N 76.380076°E
- Country: India
- State: Kerala
- District: Ernakulam
- Taluk: Aluva

Languages
  - Official: Malayalam, Tamil
- Time zone: UTC+5:30 (IST)
- PIN: 683571
- Telephone code: 0484
- Vehicle registration: KL-41, KL-7, KL-40
- Nearest city: Aluva, Angamaly and Kochi in Ernakulam
- Lok Sabha constituency: Chalakudy
- Assembly constituency: Aluva
- Literacy rate: 99.63%

Neduvannoor is a village situated near Cochin International Airport in Ernakulam District in the Indian state of Kerala.

== Politics ==
Neduvannoor is a part of Aluva Kerala assembly constituency in Chalakudy (Lok Sabha constituency). Anwar sadath is the current MLA of Aluva. Benny Behanan is the current member of parliament of Chalakudy.

The Indian National Congress (INC), the Communist Party of India (Marxist) (CPM), Kerala Congress (B) and BJP are the major political parties.

== Geography ==
Neduvannoor is a small village in Chengamand panchayats. Neduvannoor is a village in Chowara-Airport road.

== Demographics ==
Malayalam is the native language of Neduvannoor.
