= Chengamanad, Ernakulam district =

Chengamanad
- Gram panchayat
- Interactive map of Chengamanad
- Coordinates: 10.1650700°N 76.362340°E
- Country: India
- State: Kerala
- District: Ernakulam

Population (2001)
  - Total: 29,775

Languages
  - Official: Malayalam, English
- Time zone: UTC+5:30 (IST)
- Telephone code: 0484
- Vehicle registration: KL-41

Chengamanad is a small town in Aluva, Ernakulam district in the state of Kerala, India. It is situated on the banks of the river Periyar.

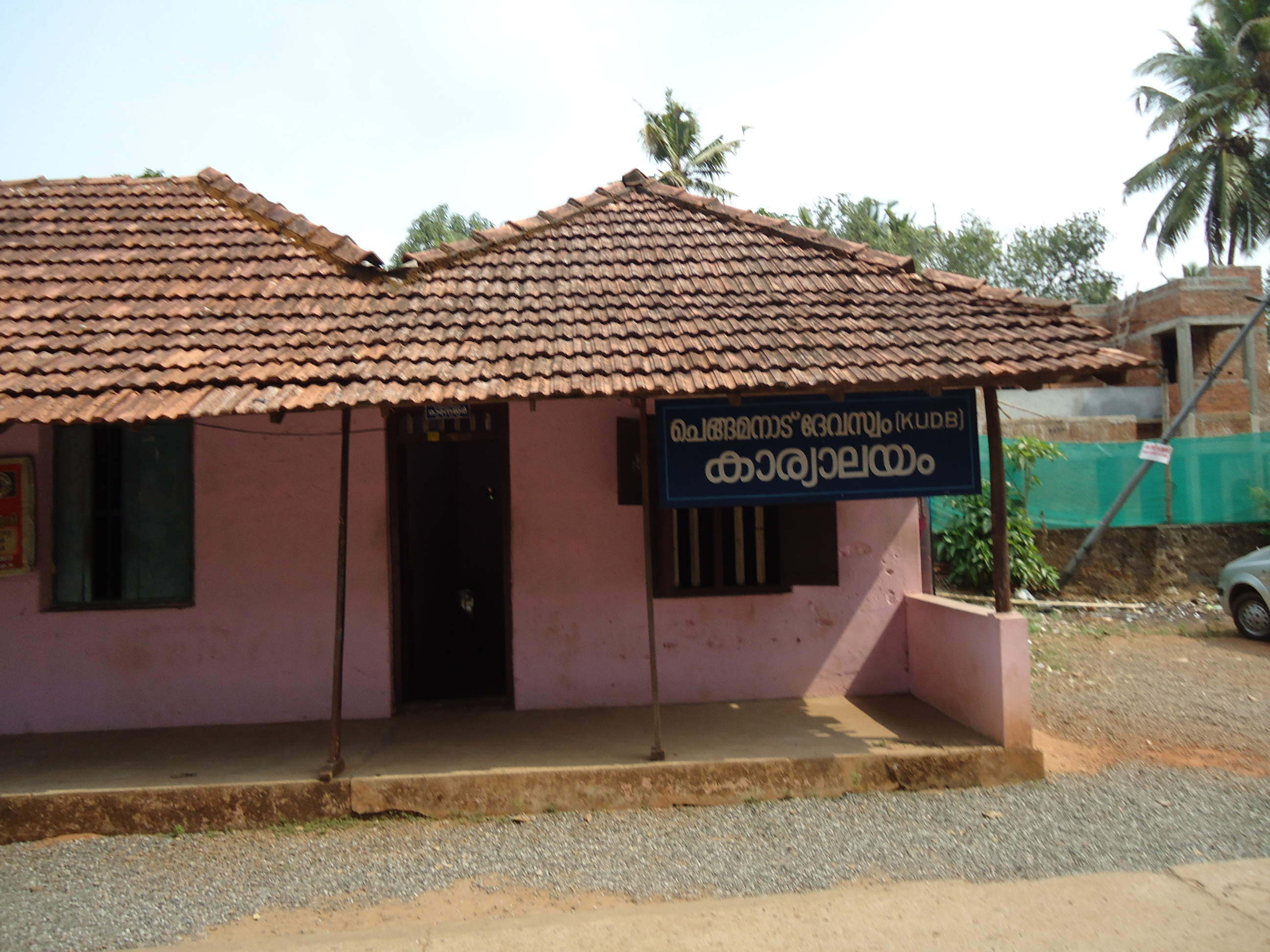
Temple Office

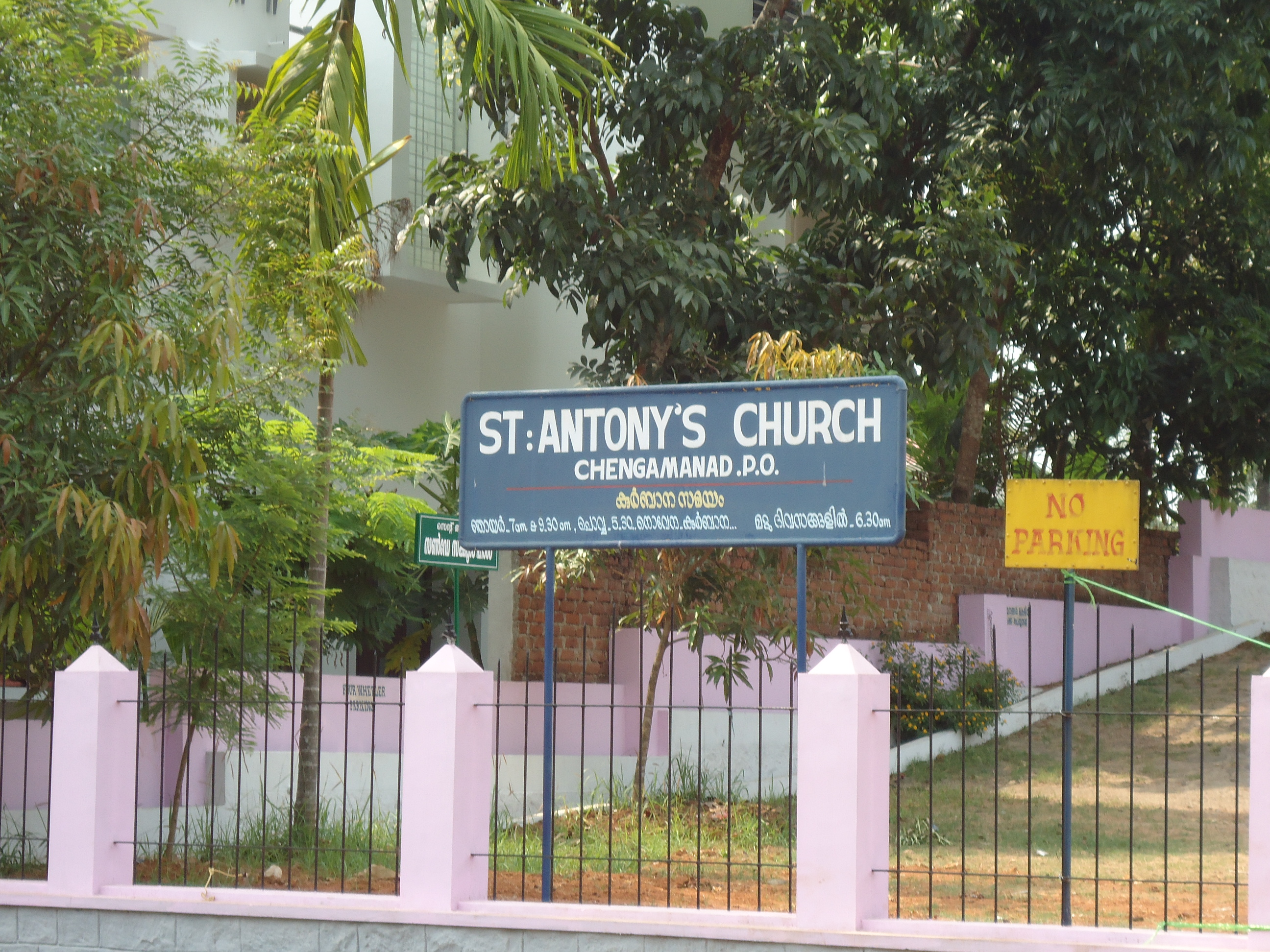
St.Antony's Church

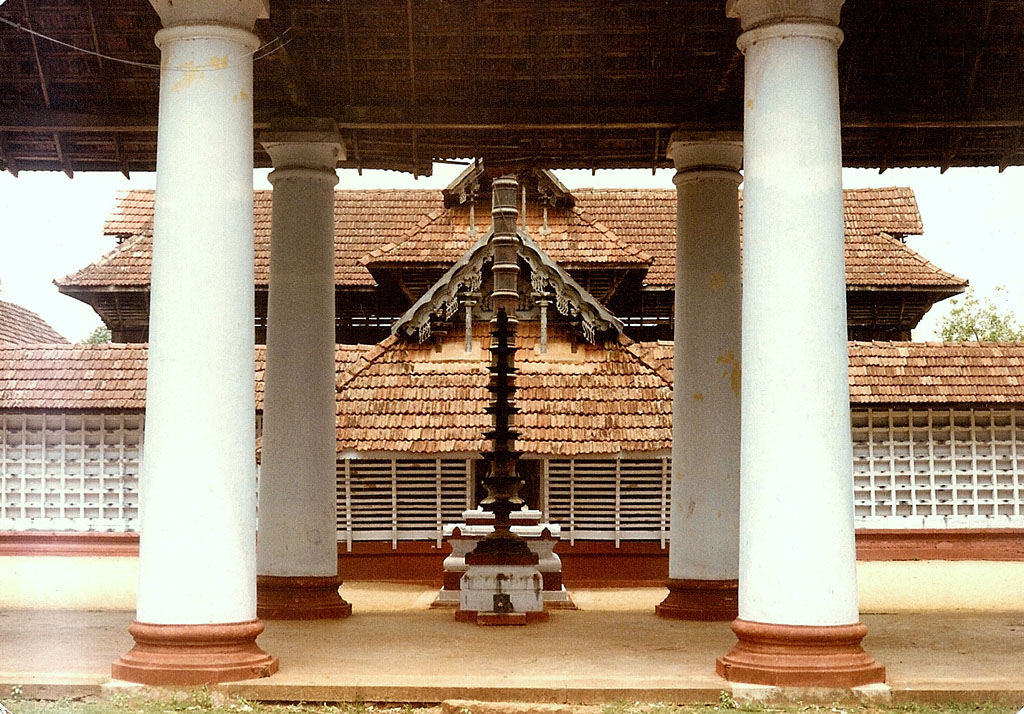
Chengamanad Mahadeva temple - Front View

== Demographics ==
As of 2001 India census, Chengamanad had a population of 29,775. Males constitute 49% of the population and females 51%. Chengamanad has an average literacy rate of 80%, higher than the national average of 59.5%; with male literacy of 82% and female literacy of 78%. 11% of the population is under 6 years of age.

== Etymology ==
According to legends, the place derives its name from Jangama Muni, who is said to have done penance in a cave in the Munikkal Guhalaya. The place was initially called Jangamanad, which later became Chengamanad. Another account says that the name Chengamand is due to the special kind of soil .

== The Ancient legend of Thoma, Mathai and Pylee ==
The ancient scriptures record the arrival of three mysterious men to the village. Not much is known about these men, except that they were part of the growth and development of the villagers. They spend much time researching for unknown purposes and communicating with the local people only on occasion for various requirements. The names of these men are mentioned among the people even today and sightings of them have also been mentioned in various surrounding parts of Annamanada.

== Chengamanad Mahadeva Temple ==
The Chengamand Mahadeva temple is the centre of attraction in Chengamanad and is one of the important Shiva temples in Aluva. The main deity, Shiva is in the form of Kirata Murthi facing east. The shrines of Shree Parvathi and Ganapathi face towards west and south, respectively.

The temple is owned by 10 Brahmin families. They are "Thaliyal Mana, Makaramattathu Mana, Maliekkal Mana, Padamattathu Mana, Padappa Mana, Vaippan Mana, Edaprambilli Mana, Mozhully Mana, Valiyakodathu Mana, and Azhvanchery Thamprakkal". Since the members of these families are spread out in various places and the management of the temple became difficult, administrative powers were transferred to the "Urazhma Devaswam Board". As of now, the temple administration is done by the "Urazhma Devaswam Board" with active guidance from a committee formed by the local people.

The annual festival of the temple comes to Dhanu. It begins with kodiyettu (hoisting of the temple flag) on Chathayam day, lasts for 10 days and ends on Thiruvathira nakshatra. Many temple art forms like 'Kadhakali', 'Ottamthullal', Paadakam', etc. are performed during the festival days. The most important vazhipaadu (offering) in the festival days is 'Ulsavabali'. On the last day of the festival called Aarattu, there is a fantastic ezhunnellippu (procession) with seven elephants accompanied by 'Panchavaadhyam' and 'Paandimelam'.

== Places of worship ==
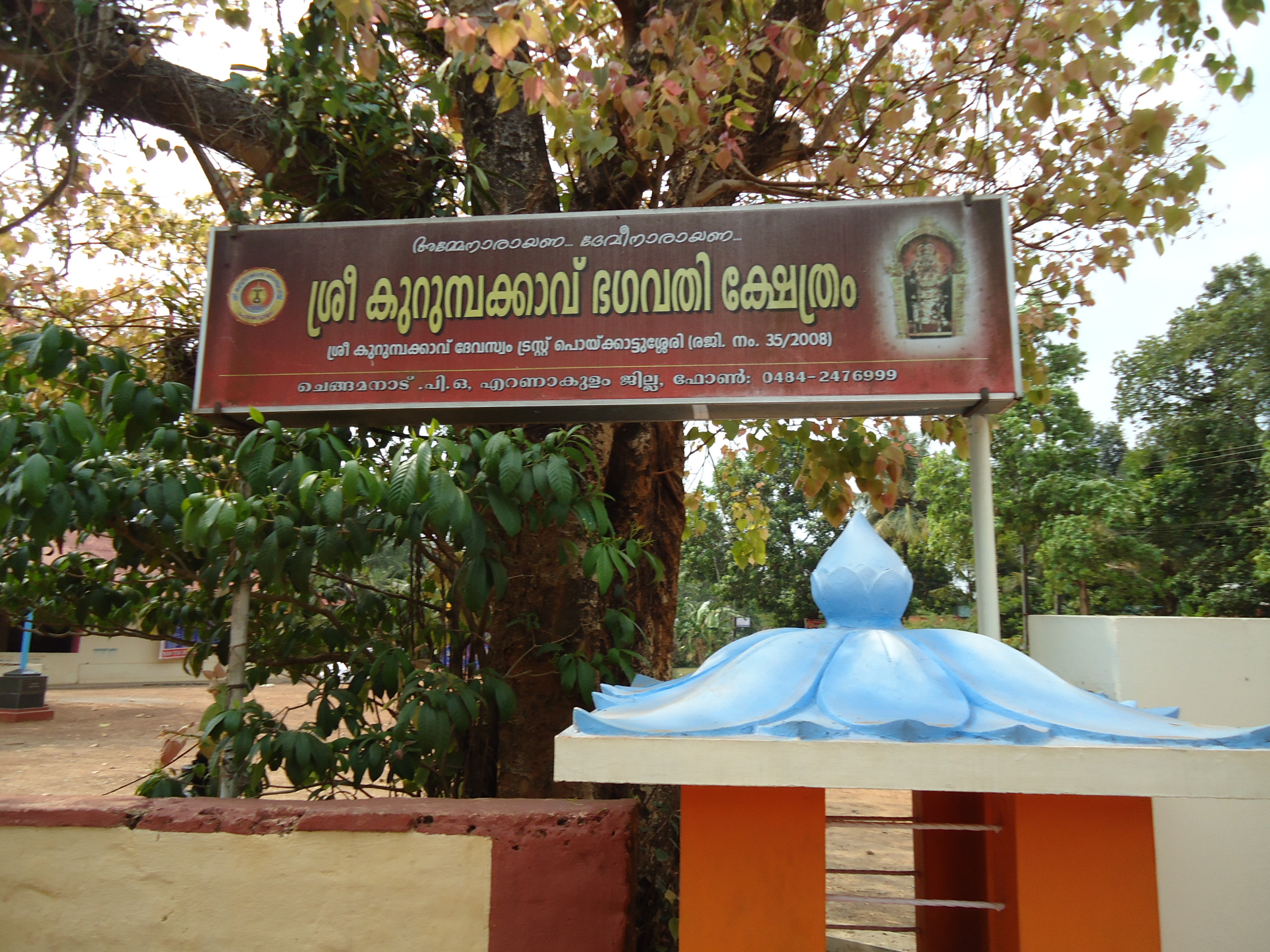
Kurumbakkavu Bhagavathi Temple, Poykkattussery

- St. Antony's Church

The Roman Catholic Church in the Name of St. Antony is another attraction in the place. Holy Feast of the Church is celebrated in the last week of January. The foundation stone of the church was laid in 1916. The congregation consists of 500 families. Every Tuesday evening at 5.30 PM St: Antony's Novena is held at this Church and hundreds of people attend this worship and Novena.

- Palaprassery Juma Masjid

Palaprassery Juma Masjid which represents the Muslim community of the western area is another landmark. The masjid is situated 1 km away from Chengamanad Junction on the Parur road.

- Chengamanad Mahadeva temple

This Siva temple is one of the main attractions of the village

- Panayakkadavu Muhiyadheen Juma Masjid

The masjid situates half km away from Chengamanad Junction

- Munikkal Guhalaya Temple

The other center of attraction in Chengamand is the Munikkal temple. It is a small shrine dedicated to Load Subramanyan (the son of Shiva). The temple is situated on a large rock resembling the back of an elephant. Munikkal Guhalayam located atop a hill at Chengamanad (30 km north of Kochi), is a place shrouded in mythology. It is believed that sage Jangaman had lived here around 2000 years ago, and the place was initially known as Jangaman, which later changed to Chengamanad. A famous Lord Murugan temple is located on the spot where the sage is said to have meditated which was later consecrated by Chattambi Swamikal in 1898. The word "Munikkal Guhalayam" literally means "Sages Rock Cave". Another story goes that Lord Murugan also called "Guhalayam" had made this place his abode, hence the word "Guhalavam"

- Cheriyathu Mahavishnu Temple Desom

It's a small temple located in Thallakolly in Chengamanadu. It's currently under renovation and it's been completed in April 2024 the Temple Trust has done its first utsavam. There is a great history behind this temple, it's been said that one wing of The Might Eagle Jadayu from the epic novel had fallen here and the other on the opposite side of the temple where another temple has been built The Cheriyathu Narasimhaswami temple.

== Transport ==
Chengamanad is 10 km from Aluva Town by road on the Parur - Angamaly bus route. The nearest railway station is Aluva(10 km). The nearest airport is Cochin International Airport in Nedumbassery, 3 km from Chengamanad.

== Notable people ==
Bro. Varghese Theckanath s.g., Director, Montfort Social Institute, Hyderabad. Represented India at the 99th ILO Conference in Geneva. Awarded the 'Jewell of India Award' and 'Rashtriya Vidya Gaurav Gold Medal' for outstanding contribution to national integration and education, on April 6, 2016, at the Indian Society for International Law, New Delhi.
