= Basilique Notre-Dame =

Basilique Notre-Dame is the French name for a number of Basilicas dedicated to the Virgin Mary. These include:

- Notre-Dame d'Afrique, Byzantine Revival building in Algiers, Algeria, inaugurated in 1872
- Basilica of Notre-Dame d'Alençon, 15th-century Gothic building in Alençon, Orne, France
- Basilique Notre-Dame de Brebières 19th century Albert, France
- Basilique Notre-Dame de Bonsecours, Gothic Revival building in Bonsecours, Normandy, France, completed in 1844
- Basilica of Notre-Dame de Boulogne, Classical and Renaissance building in Boulogne, France
- Notre-Dame de la Daurade, 19th-century building in Toulouse, France
- Basilique Notre-Dame de la Délivrance, minor basilica in Popenguine, Senegal dedicated in 1991
- Notre-Dame de l'Épine, Flamboyant Gothic building in L'Épine, Marne, France built in 1527
- Basilica of Notre-Dame de Fourvière, Romanesque and Byzantine building in Lyon, France, completed in 1884
- Notre-Dame de la Garde, Romanesque building in Marseille, France, consecrated in 1864
- Basilica of Our Lady of Geneva, Neo-Gothic building in Geneva, Switzerland, completed in 1857
- Basilica of Our Lady of the Immaculate Conception, consecrated in 1876 in Lourdes, France
- Basilica of the Blessed Virgin Mary, Lodonga, 1961 building in Lodonga, Uganda
- Notre-Dame Basilica (Montreal), Gothic Revival building in Montreal, Quebec, Canada completed in 1843
- Notre-Dame de Nice, Gothic Revival building in Nice, France, completed in 1868
- Basilique de Notre Dame de la Paix in Yamoussoukro, Ivory Coast, modelled on the Basilica of Saint Peter in Rome and consecrated in 1990
- Basilica of Notre-Dame du Port, Romanesque building in Auvergne, France
- Cathedral-Basilica of Notre-Dame de Québec, Neo-classic building in Québec, Canada, dating to 1743
- Basilica of Notre-Dame de la Trinité in Blois, Loir-et-Cher, France, consecrated in 1949
- Basilica of Notre-Dame-des-Victoires, Paris, completed in 1737
