= Thérèse of Lisieux =

French Discalced Carmelite nun and saint (1873–1897)

Saint Therese of Lisieux OCD
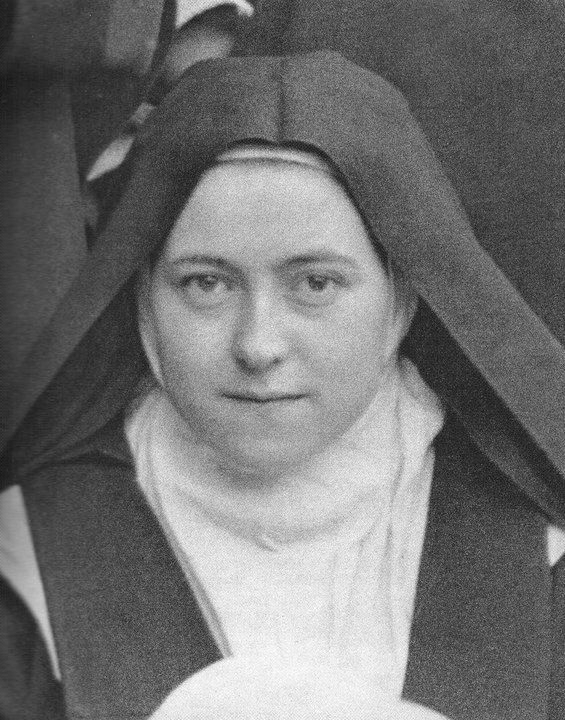
- Saint Thérèse of Lisieux, 15 April 1895

Virgin, Doctor of the Church
- Born: Marie Françoise-Thérèse Martin; 2 January 1873; Alençon, Orne, France
- Died: 30 September 1897 (aged 24); Lisieux, Calvados, France
- Venerated in: Catholic Church
- Beatified: 29 April 1923 by Pope Pius XI
- Canonized: 17 May 1925 by Pope Pius XI
- Major shrine: Basilica of Sainte-Thérèse, Lisieux, France
- Feast: 1 October (Roman Calendar); 3 October (Pre-1969 Roman Calendar, Melkite Calendar)
- Attributes: Discalced Carmelite habit, holding a crucifix covered with roses
- Patronage: Missions and missionaries, France, Russian Catholics, those suffering from terminal illness or tuberculosis, florists and gardeners, orphaned children, those who are homeless, aviators.

Thérèse of Lisieux (born Marie Françoise-Thérèse Martin; 2 January 1873 – 30 September 1897), religious name Therese of the Child Jesus and the Holy Face was a French Discalced Carmelite. She is popularly known in English as the "Little Flower of Jesus", or simply the "Little Flower", and in French and German as the "little Therese", in contrast to Teresa of Avila, who is called the "great Therese").

Therese has been a highly influential model of sanctity for Catholics and for others because of the simplicity and practicality of her approach to the spiritual life. She is one of the most popular saints in the history of the church, although she was obscure during her lifetime. Pope Pius X called her "the greatest saint of modern times".

Born to two future saints, Therese felt an early call to religious life and, after overcoming various obstacles, in 1888, at age 15, she became a nun and joined two of her elder sisters in the cloistered Carmelite community of Lisieux in Normandy (another sister, Céline, also later joined the order). After nine years as a Carmelite nun, having fulfilled various offices such as sacristan and assistant to the novice mistress, in her last eighteen months in Carmel she fell into a night of faith, in which she is said to have felt Jesus was absent and been tormented by doubts that God existed. Therese died at the age of 24 from tuberculosis.

After her death, Therese became known globally through her spiritual memoir, The Story of a Soul, which explains her theology of the "Little Way". As a result of her immense popularity and reputation for holiness, she was quickly beatified and canonized by Pope Pius XI, who completed the process just 28 years after her death. In 1997, Pope John Paul II declared her a Doctor of the Church. Her feast day in the General Roman Calendar was 3 October from 1927 until it was moved in 1969 to 1 October. She is well known throughout the world, with the Basilica of Lisieux being the second most popular place of pilgrimage in France after Lourdes.

== Life ==
=== Family background ===
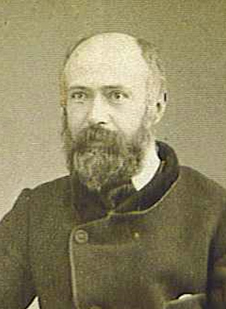
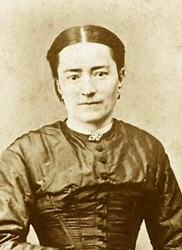
Therese's parents, Louis Martin and Marie-Azélie Guérin, c. 1875

Marie Françoise-Thérèse Martin was born on Rue Saint-Blaise, in Alençon, France on 2 January 1873, and was the daughter of lacemaker Marie-Azélie Guérin (usually called Zélie), and Louis Martin who was a jeweler and watchmaker. Both her parents were devout Catholics who would eventually become the first (and so far only) married couple canonized together by the Catholic Church (by Pope Francis in 2015).

Louis had tried to become a canon regular, wanting to enter the Great St Bernard Hospice, but had been refused because he did not know Latin. Zélie, possessed of a strong, active temperament, wished to serve the sick, and had also considered entering consecrated life, but the prioress of the canonesses regular of the Hôtel-Dieu in Alençon had discouraged her outright. Disappointed, Zélie learned lacemaking instead. She excelled in it and set up her own business on Rue Saint-Blaise at age 22.

Louis and Zélie met in early 1858 and married on July 13 of that same year at the Basilica of Notre-Dame d'Alençon. At first they decided to live as brother and sister in perpetual continence, but when a confessor discouraged them in this, they changed their lifestyle and had nine children. From 1867 to 1870, they lost 3 infants and five-year-old Hélène. All five of their surviving daughters became nuns. In addition to Therese, they were:

- Marie-Louise (February 22, 1860, a Carmelite in Lisieux, in religion Sister Marie of the Sacred Heart, d. January 19, 1940),
- Marie-Pauline (September 7, 1861, a Carmelite in Lisieux, in religion Mother Agnes of Jesus, d. July 28, 1951),
- Léonie (June 3, 1863, a Visitandine at Caen, in religion Sister Françoise-Thérèse, d. June 16, 1941), and
- Céline (April 28, 1869, a Carmelite in Lisieux, in religion Sister Geneviève of the Holy Face, d. February 25, 1959).

"A dreamer and brooder, an idealist and romantic, [the father] gave touching and naïve pet names [to his daughters]: Marie was his 'diamond', Pauline his 'noble pearl', Céline 'the bold one'. But Therese was his 'little queen', to whom all treasures belonged."

=== Birth and infancy ===
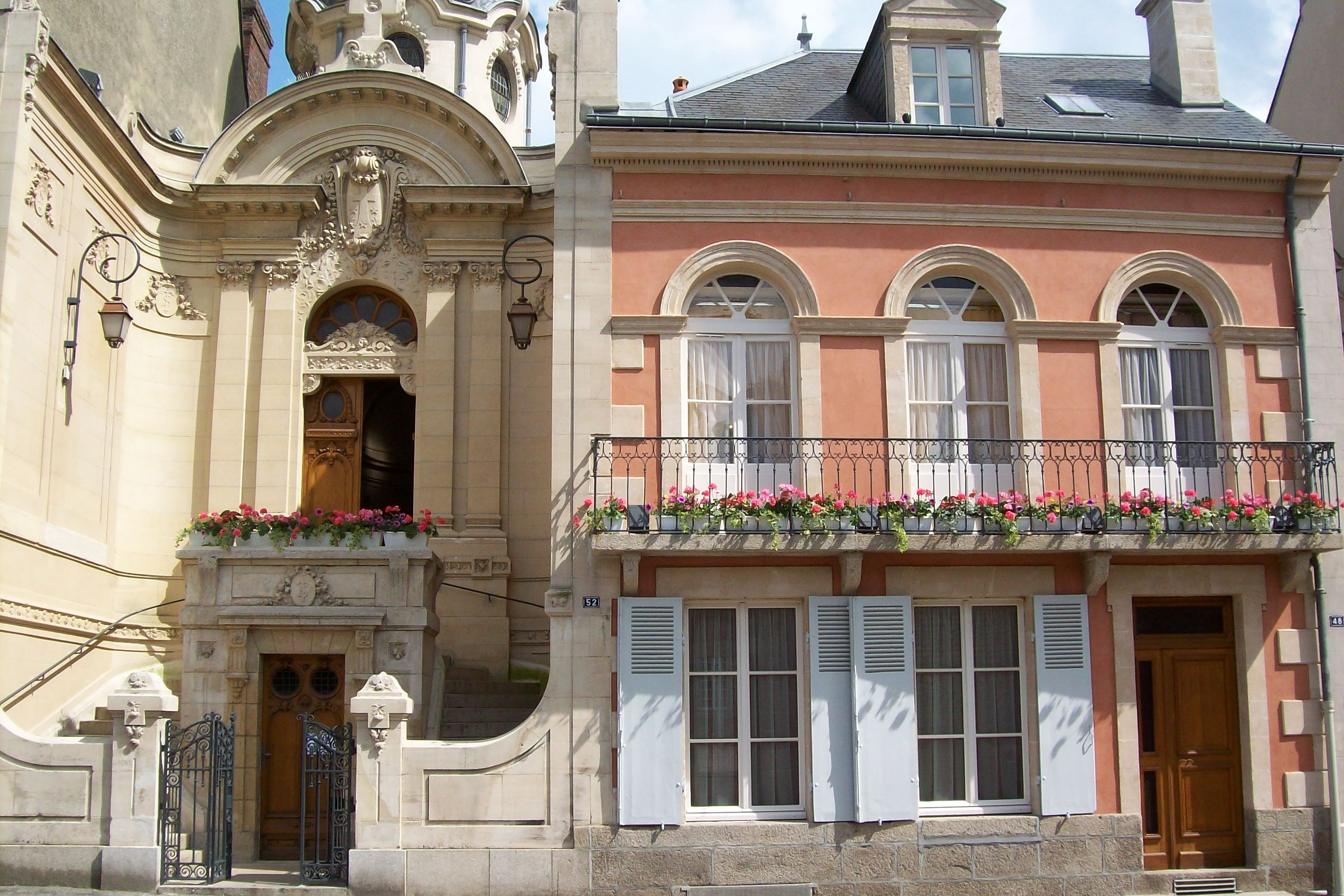
Rue Saint-Blaise's house at Alençon: The family home and Therese's birthplace

Soon after her birth in January 1873, the outlook for the survival of Therese Martin was uncertain. Because of her frail condition, she was entrusted to a wet nurse, Rose Taillé, who had already nursed two of the Martin children. Rose had her own children and could not live with the Martins, so Therese was sent to live with her in the bocage forests of Semallé.

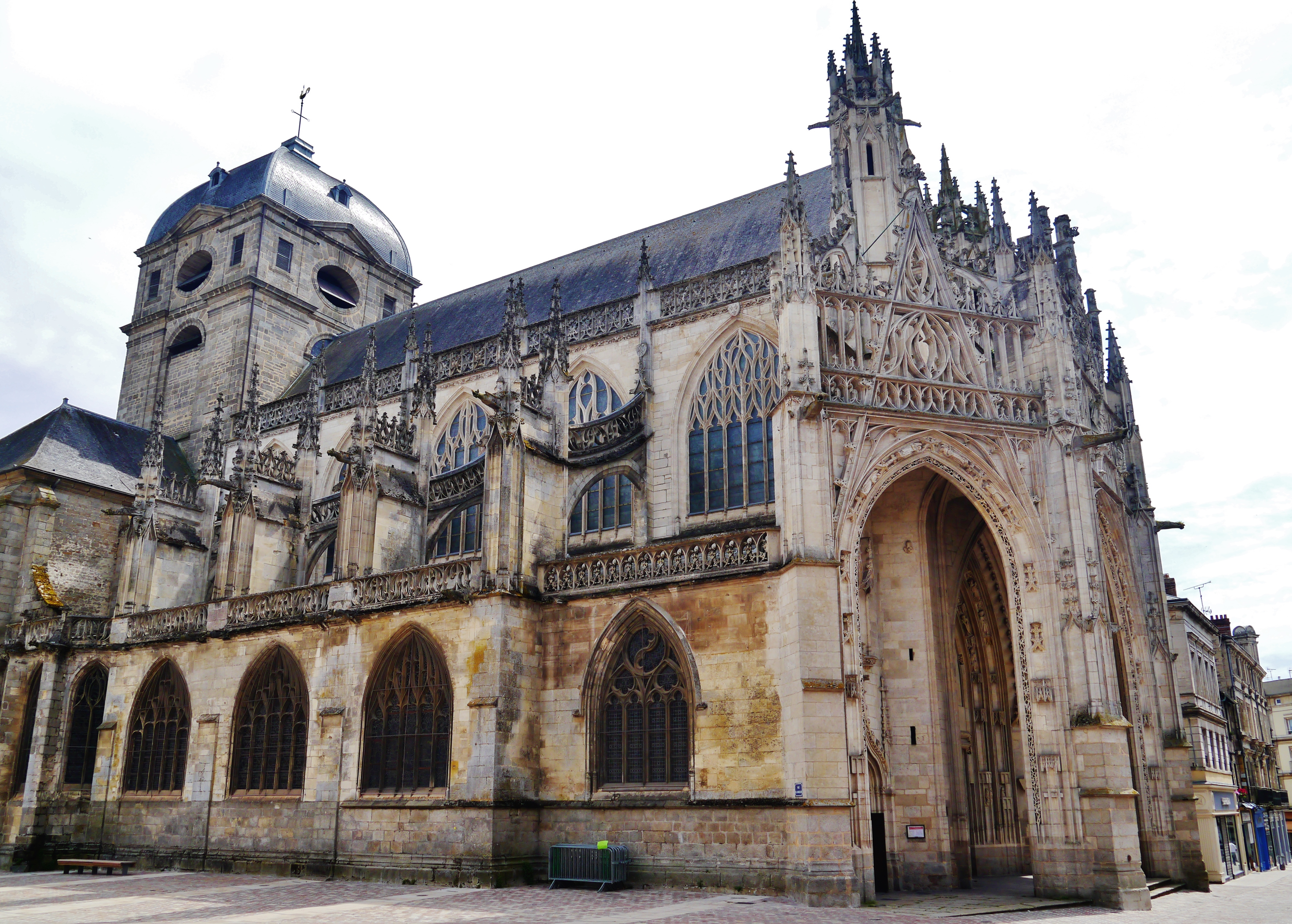
Basilica of Notre-Dame d'Alençon, where Therese was baptized

On 2 April 1874, when she was 15 months old, she returned to Alençon where her family surrounded her with affection. "I hear the baby calling me Mama! as she goes down the stairs. On every step, she calls out Mama! and if I don't respond every time, she remains there without going either forward or back." (Madame Martin to Pauline, 21 November 1875) She was educated in a very Catholic environment, including Mass attendance at 5:30 a.m., the strict observance of fasts, and prayer to the rhythm of the liturgical year. The Martins also practiced charity, visiting the sick and elderly and welcoming the occasional vagabond to their table. Even if she was not the model little girl her sisters later portrayed, Therese was very responsive to this education. She played at being a nun. Described as generally a happy child, she also manifested other emotions, and often cried: "Céline is playing with the little one with some bricks ... I have to correct poor baby who gets into frightful tantrums when she can't have her own way. She rolls in the floor in despair believing all is lost. Sometimes she is so overcome she almost chokes. She's a nervous child, but she is very good, very intelligent, and remembers everything." At 22, Therese, then a Carmelite, admitted: "I was far from being a perfect little girl".

From 1865, Zélie had complained of breast pain and in December 1876 a doctor told her of the seriousness of the tumour. In June 1877 she left for Lourdes hoping to be cured, but it did not happen. On 28 August 1877, Zélie died, aged 45. Her funeral was conducted in the Basilica of Notre-Dame d'Alençon. Therese was barely four and a half years old. She later wrote: "When Mummy died, my happy disposition changed. I had been so lively and open; now I became diffident and oversensitive, crying if anyone looked at me. I was only happy if no one took notice of me… It was only in the intimacy of my own family, where everyone was wonderfully kind, that I could be more myself."

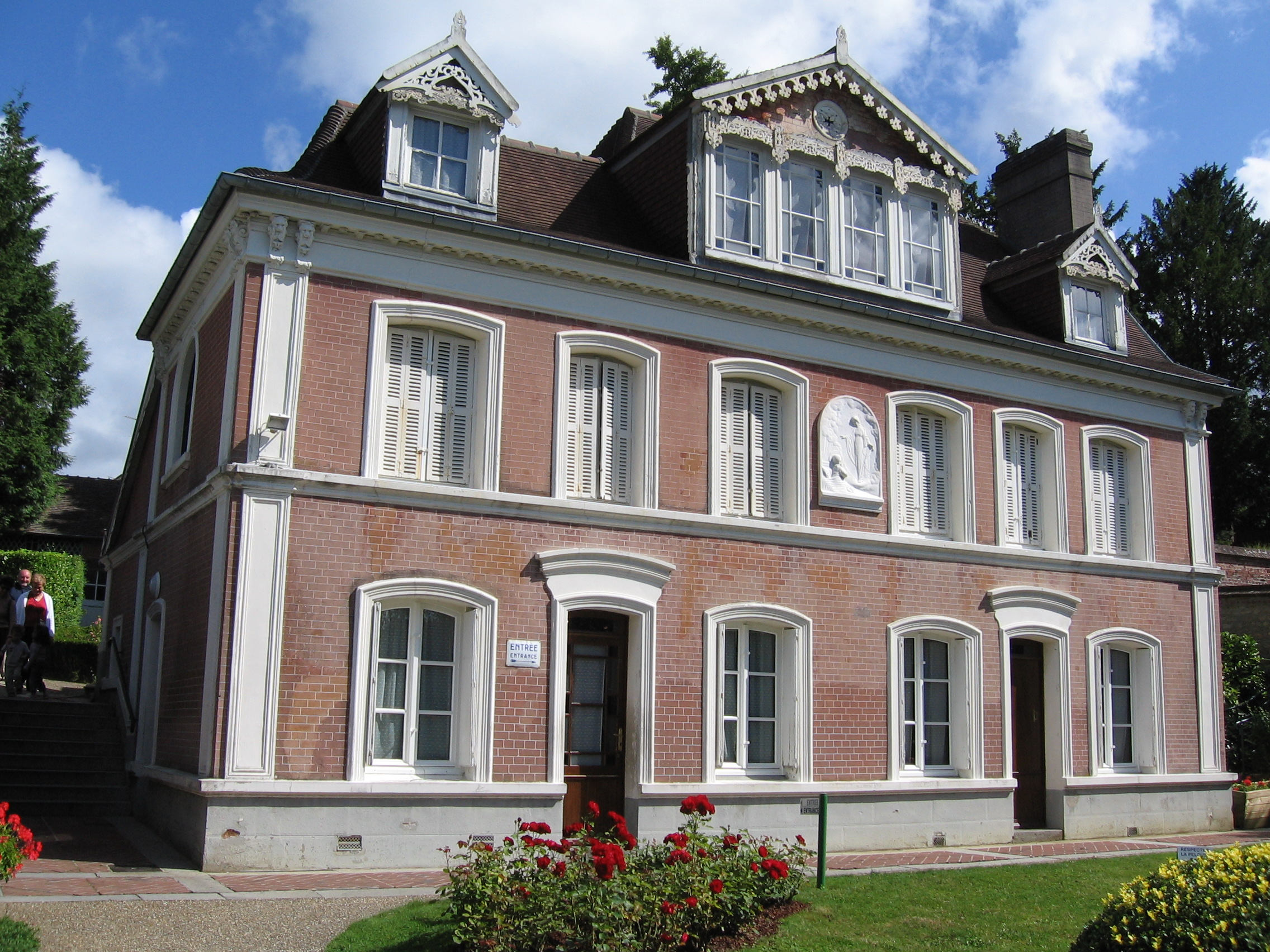
Les Buissonnets, the Martin family house in Lisieux to which they moved in November 1877 following the death of Madame Martin. Therese lived here from 16 November 1877 to 9 April 1888, the day she entered Carmel

Three months after Zélie died, Louis Martin left Alençon, where he had spent his youth and marriage, and moved to Lisieux in the Calvados Department of Normandy, where Zélie's pharmacist brother, Isidore Guérin, lived with his wife and their two daughters, Jeanne and Marie. In her last months Zélie had given up the lace business. After her death, Louis sold it. Louis leased a pretty, spacious country house, Les Buissonnets, situated in a large garden on the slope of a hill overlooking the town. Looking back, Therese would see the move to Les Buissonnets as the beginning of the "second period of my life, the most painful of the three: it extends from the age of four-and-a-half to fourteen, the time when I rediscovered my childhood character, and entered into the serious side of life". In Lisieux, Pauline took on the role of Therese's "Mama". She took this role seriously, and Therese grew especially close to her, and to Céline, the sister closest to her in age.

=== Early years ===
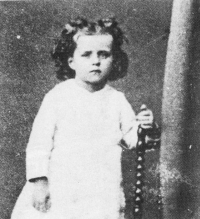
Therese in 1876

Therese was taught at home until she was eight and a half, and then entered the school kept by the Benedictine nuns of the Abbey of Notre Dame du Pre in Lisieux. Therese, taught well and carefully by Marie and Pauline, found herself at the top of the class, except for writing and arithmetic. However, because of her young age and high grades, she was bullied. "The five years I spent at school were the saddest of my life, and if my dear Céline had not been with me I could not have stayed there for a single month without falling ill." Céline informs us, "She now developed a fondness for hiding, she did not want to be observed, for she sincerely considered herself inferior".

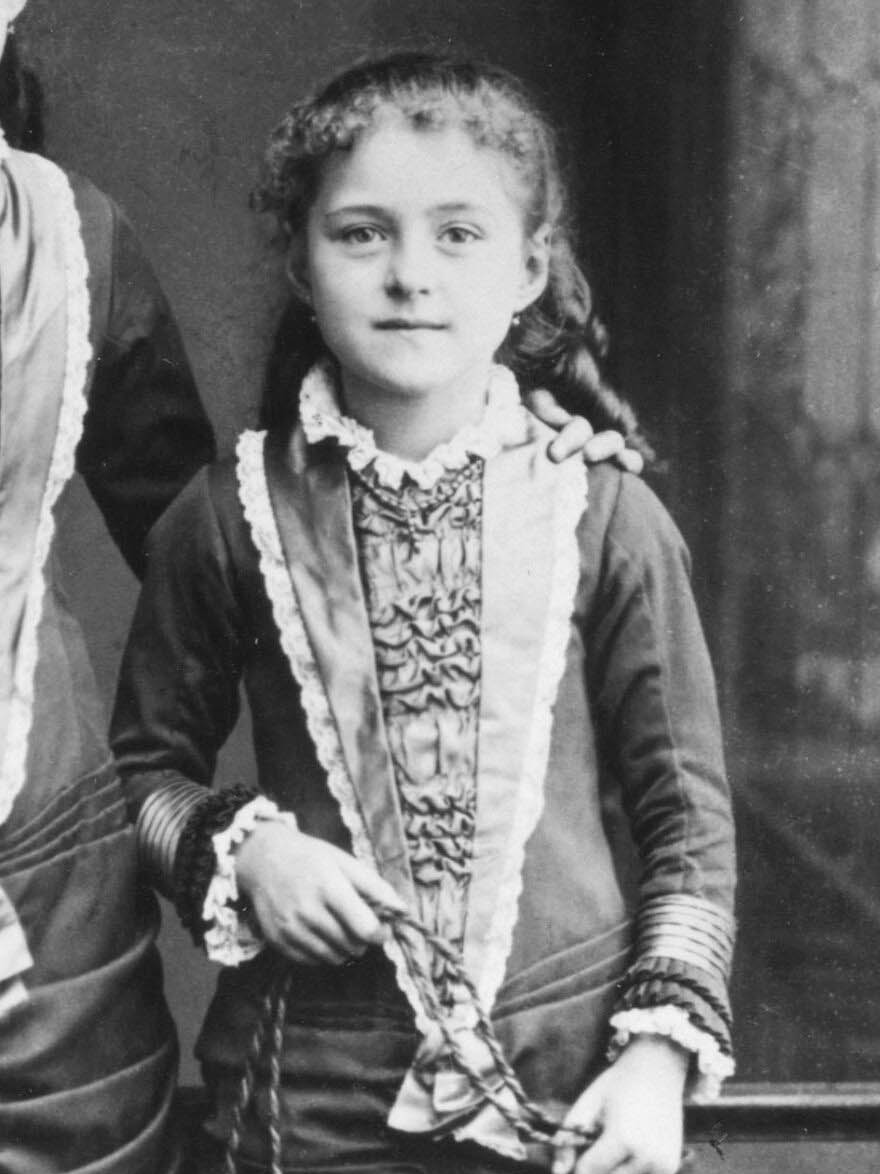
Therese aged 8, 1881

On her free days she became more and more attached to Marie Guérin, the younger of her two cousins in Lisieux. The two girls would play at being anchorites, as Teresa of Avila had once played with her brother. And every evening she plunged into the family circle. Yet the tension of the double life and the daily self-conquest placed a strain on Therese. Going to school became more and more difficult.

When she was nine years old, in October 1882, her sister Pauline entered the Carmelite convent at Lisieux. Therese was devastated. She understood that Pauline was cloistered and that she would never come back. "I said in the depths of my heart: Pauline is lost to me!" She also wanted to join the Carmelites, but was told she was too young. Yet, Therese so impressed Mother Marie Gonzague, the prioress, that she wrote to comfort Therese around the turn of the year 1882/83, calling her "my little daughter Therese of the Child Jesus".

=== Illness ===
At this time, Therese was often sick. She began to suffer from nervous tremors. The tremors started one night after her uncle took her for a walk and began to talk about Zélie. Assuming that she was cold, the family covered Therese with blankets, but the tremors continued. She clenched her teeth and could not speak. The family called Dr. Notta, who could make no diagnosis. In 1882, Dr. Gayral diagnosed that Therese "reacts to an emotional frustration with a neurotic attack".

Alarmed, but cloistered, Pauline began to write letters to Therese and attempted various strategies to intervene. Eventually Therese recovered after she had turned to gaze at the statue of the Virgin Mary placed in Marie's room, where Therese had been moved. She reported on 13 May 1883 that she had seen the Virgin smile at her. She wrote: "Our Blessed Lady has come to me, she has smiled upon me. How happy I am." However, when Therese told the Carmelite nuns about this vision at the request of her eldest sister Marie, she found herself assailed by their questions and she lost confidence. Self-doubt made her begin to question what had happened. "I thought I had lied – I was unable to look upon myself without a feeling of profound horror." "For a long time after my cure, I thought that my sickness was deliberate and this was a real martyrdom for my soul". Her concerns over this continued until November 1887.

In October 1886, her oldest sister, Marie, entered the same Carmelite monastery, adding to Therese's grief as Marie did not wait for her. Therese also suffered from scruples, a condition experienced by other saints such as Alphonsus Liguori, also a Doctor of the Church, and Ignatius Loyola, the founder of the Jesuits. She wrote: "One would have to pass through this martyrdom to understand it well, and for me to express what I experienced for a year and a half would be impossible".

=== Complete conversion ===
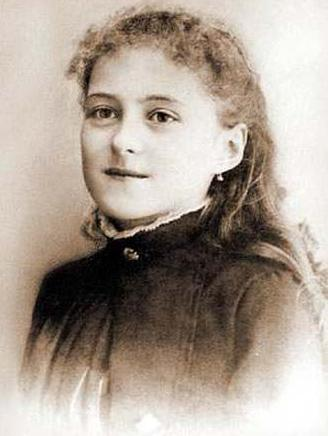
Therese in 1886, aged 13

Christmas Eve of 1886 was a turning point in the life of Therese; she called it her "complete conversion". Years later she stated that on that night she overcame the pressures she had faced since the death of her mother and said that "God worked a little miracle to make me grow up in an instant".

That night, Louis Martin and his daughters, Léonie, Céline and Therese, attended Midnight Mass at the cathedral in Lisieux – "but there was very little heart left in them. On 1 December, Léonie, covered in eczema and hiding her hair under a short mantilla, had returned to Les Buissonnets after just seven weeks of the Poor Clares regime in Alençon", and her sisters were helping her get over her sense of failure and humiliation. Back at Les Buissonnets as every year, Therese "as was the custom for French children, had left her shoes on the hearth, empty in anticipation of gifts, not from Father Christmas but from the Child Jesus, who was imagined to travel through the air bearing toys and cakes." When looking at Therese's shoes on the fireplace she heard her father saying, "Well, fortunately, this will be the last year!" Therese had begun to cry and Céline advised her not to go back downstairs immediately. Then, suddenly, Therese pulled herself together and wiped her tears. She ran down the stairs, knelt by the fireplace and unwrapped her surprises as jubilantly as ever. In her account, nine years later, of 1895: "The work I had been unable to do in ten years was done by Jesus in one instant, contenting himself with my good will which was never lacking." She discovered the joy in self-forgetfulness and added, "I felt charity enter into my soul, and the need to forget myself and to please others; since then I've been happy!"

According to Ida Görres,

Therese instantly understood what had happened to her when she won this banal little victory over her sensitivity, which she had borne for so long; ... freedom is found in resolutely looking away from oneself ... and the fact that a person can cast himself away from himself reveals again that being good, victory is pure grace, a sudden gift ... It cannot be coerced, and yet it can be received only by the patiently prepared heart.

Biographer Kathryn Harrison:

After all, in the past she had tried to control herself, had tried with all her being and had failed. Grace, alchemy, masochism: through whatever lens we view her transport, Therese's night of illumination presented both its power and its danger. It would guide her steps between the mortal and the divine, between living and dying, destruction and apotheosis. It would take her exactly where she intended to go.

Therese's character and the early experiences that shaped her have been the subject of analysis, particularly in recent years. The Catholic author Ida Görres, whose formal studies had focused on church history and hagiography, wrote a psychological analysis of Therese's character. Some authors suggest that Therese had a strongly neurotic aspect to her personality for most of her life. Harrison concluded that, "her temperament was not formed for compromise or moderation ... a life spent not taming but directing her appetite and her will, a life perhaps shortened by the force of her desire and ambition."

=== Rome and entry to Carmel ===
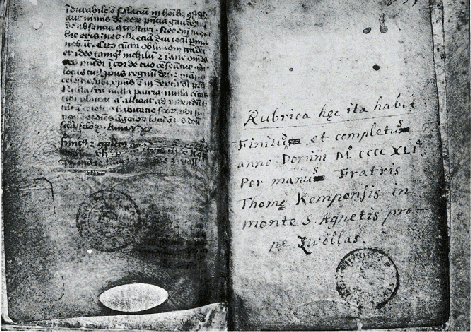
15th-century manuscript of The Imitation of Christ

Before she was fourteen, when she started to experience a period of calm, Therese started to read The Imitation of Christ. She read the Imitation intently, as if the author traced each sentence for her: "The Kingdom of God is within you… Turn thee with thy whole heart unto the Lord; and forsake this wretched world: and thy soul shall find rest." She kept the book with her constantly and wrote later that this book and parts of another book of a very different character, lectures by Abbé Charles Arminjon on The End of This World, and the Mysteries of the World to Come, nourished her during this critical period. Thereafter she began to read other books, mostly on history and science.

In May 1887, Therese approached her 63-year-old father Louis, who was recovering from a small stroke, while he sat in the garden one Sunday afternoon and told him that she wanted to celebrate the anniversary of "her conversion" by entering Carmel before Christmas. Louis and Therese both broke down and cried, but Louis got up, gently picked a white flower and gave it to her, explaining the care with which God brought it into being and preserved it until that day. Therese later wrote: "While I listened I believed I was hearing my own story, so great was the resemblance between what Jesus had done for the little flower and little Thérèse". To Therese, the flower seemed a symbol of herself, "seemed destined to live on in another soil more fertile than the tender moss where it had spent its first days." Therese renewed her attempts to join the Carmel, but the Father Superior of Carmel would not allow it on account of her youth.

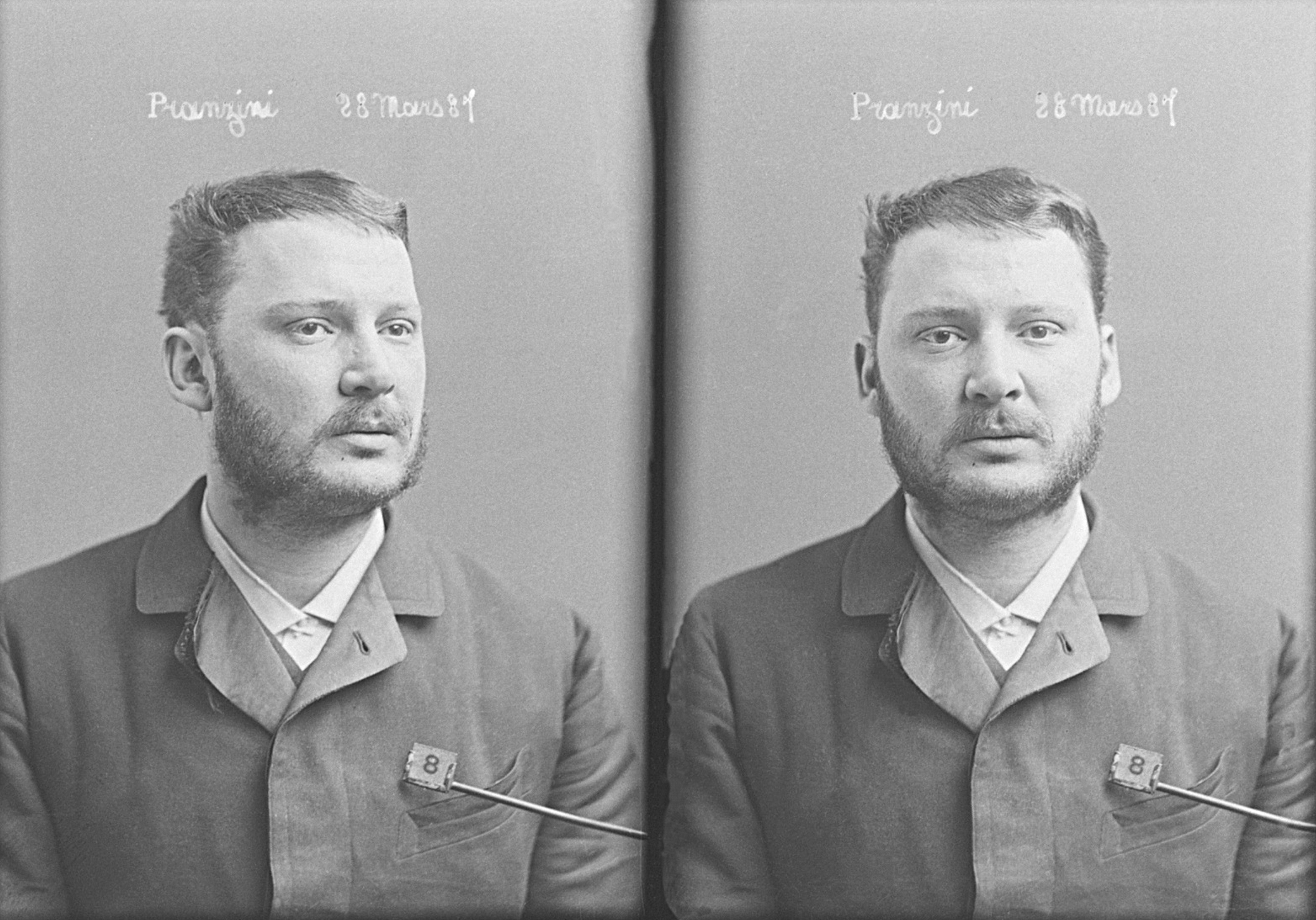
1887 mug shot of Henri Pranzini

During the summer, French newspapers were filled with the story of Henri Pranzini, convicted of the brutal murder of two women and a child. To the outraged public Pranzini represented all that threatened the decent way of life in France. In July and August 1887 Thérèse prayed for the conversion of Pranzini, so his soul could be saved, yet Pranzini showed no remorse. At the end of August, the newspapers reported that just as Pranzini's neck was placed on the guillotine, he had grabbed a crucifix and kissed it three times. Thérèse was ecstatic and believed that her prayers had saved him. She continued to pray for Pranzini after his death.

In November 1887, Louis took Céline and Therese on a diocesan pilgrimage to Rome for the priestly jubilee of Pope Leo XIII. On 20 November 1887, during a general audience with Leo, Therese, in her turn, approached the Pope, knelt, and asked him to allow her to enter Carmel. The Pope said: "Well, my child, do what the superiors decide… You will enter if it is God's Will" and he blessed her. She refused to leave his feet, and the Noble Guard had to carry her out of the room.

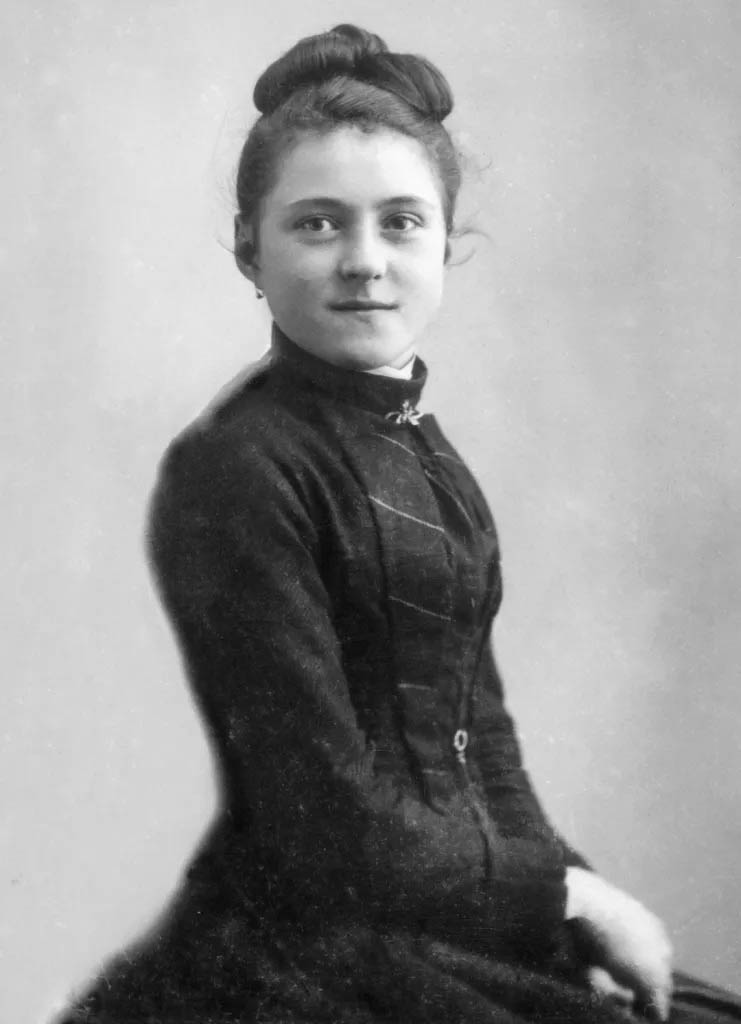
Therese at age 15. "A photograph taken in April 1888 shows a fresh, firm, girlish face ... The familiar flowing locks are combed sternly back and up, piled in a hard little chignon on the top of her head". Therese put up her hair for the first time several months earlier, when she sought permission to enter Carmel at age 14, as it was a symbol of passing childhood.

The trip continued: they visited Pompeii, Naples, Assisi before going back via Pisa and Genoa. The pilgrimage of nearly a month was timely. During it she "learnt more than in many years of study". For the first and last time in her life, she left her native Normandy. Notably she "who only knew priests in the exercise of their ministry was in their company, heard their conversations, not always edifying – and saw their shortcomings for herself".

She had understood that she had to pray and give her life for sinners like Pranzini. But Carmel prayed especially for priests and this had surprised her since their souls seemed to her to be "as pure as crystal". A month spent with many priests taught her that they are "weak and feeble men". She wrote later: "I met many saintly priests that month, but I also found that in spite of being above angels by their supreme dignity, they were none the less men and still subject to human weakness. If the holy priests, 'the salt of the earth', as Jesus calls them in the Gospel, have to be prayed for, what about the lukewarm? Again, as Jesus says, 'If the salt shall lose its savour, wherewith shall it be salted?' I understood my vocation in Italy." For the first time too she had associated with young men. "In her brotherless existence, masculinity had been represented only by her father, her Uncle Guérin and various priests. Now she had her first and only experiences. Céline declared at the beatification proceedings that one of the young men in the pilgrimage group "developed a tender affection for her". Therese confessed to her sister, "It is high time for Jesus to remove me from the poisonous breath of the world ... I feel that my heart is easily caught by tenderness, and where others fall, I would fall too. We are no stronger than the others". Soon after that, the Bishop of Bayeux authorized the prioress to receive Therese. On 9 April 1888 she became a postulant in the Carmel of Lisieux.

=== The Carmel of Lisieux ===
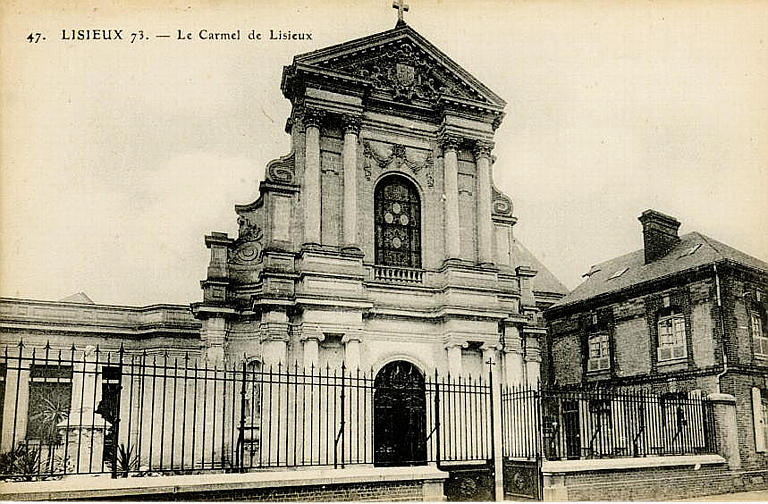
The Carmel of Lisieux

The convent Therese entered was an old-established house with a long tradition. In 1838 two nuns from the Carmel at Poitiers had been sent out to found the convent of Lisieux. One of them, Mother Geneviève of St Teresa, was still living. When Therese entered the second wing, containing the cells and sickrooms in which she was to live and die, which had been standing only ten years, "What she found was a community of very aged nuns, some odd and cranky, some sick and troubled, some lukewarm and complacent. Almost all of the sisters came from the petty bourgeois and artisan class. The Prioress and Novice Mistress were of old Normandy nobility. Probably the Martin sisters alone represented the new class of the rising bourgeoisie".

The Carmelite order had been reformed in the sixteenth century by Teresa of Ávila, essentially devoted to personal and collective prayer. The nuns of Lisieux followed strict constitutions that allowed for only one meal a day for seven months of the year, and little free time. Only one room of the building was heated. The times of silence and of solitude were many but the foundress had also planned for time for work and relaxation in common – the austerity of the life should not hinder sisterly and joyful relations. Founded in 1838, the Carmel of Lisieux in 1888 had 26 nuns, from very different classes and backgrounds. For the majority of the life of Therese, the prioress would be Mother Marie de Gonzague, born Marie-Adéle-Rosalie Davy de Virville. When Therese entered the convent Marie de Gonzague was 54, a woman of changeable humour, jealous of her authority, used sometimes in a capricious manner; this had for effect, a certain laxity in the observance of established rules. "In the sixties and seventies of the [nineteenth] century an aristocrat in the flesh counted for far more in a petty bourgeois convent than we can realize nowadays ... the superiors appointed Marie de Gonzague to the highest offices as soon as her novitiate was finished ... in 1874 began the long series of terms as prioress".

=== Postulancy ===
Therésè de Lisieux's time as a postulant began with her welcome into the Carmel, on Monday, 9 April 1888. Thérèse was 15 years and 3 months old. She felt peace after she received communion that day and later wrote: "At last my desires were realized, and I cannot describe the deep sweet peace which filled my soul. This peace has remained with me during the eight and a half years of my life here, and has never left me even amid the greatest trials."

From her childhood, Therese had dreamed of the desert to which God would some day lead her. Now she had entered that desert. Though she was now reunited with Marie and Pauline, from the first day she began her struggle to win and keep her distance from her sisters. Right at the start Marie de Gonzague, the prioress, had turned the postulant Therese over to her eldest sister Marie, who was to teach her to follow the Liturgy of the Hours. Later she appointed Therese assistant to Pauline in the refectory. When her cousin Marie Guerin also entered, she employed her and Therese to be sacristans.

Therese adhered strictly to the rule which forbade all superfluous talk during work. She saw her sisters together only in the hours of common recreation after meals. At such times she would sit down beside whomever she happened to be near, or beside a nun whom she had observed to be downcast, disregarding the tacit and sometimes expressed sensitivity and even jealousy of her biological sisters. "We must apologize to the others for our being four under one roof", she was in the habit of remarking. "When I am dead, you must be very careful not to lead a family life with one another ... I did not come to Carmel to be with my sisters; on the contrary, I saw clearly that their presence would cost me dear, for I was determined not to give way to nature." Although the novice mistress, Marie of the Angels, found Therese slow, the young postulant adapted well to her new environment. She wrote, "Illusions, God gave me the grace not to have a single one when entering Carmel. I found the religious life to be exactly as I had imagined it, no sacrifice astonished me and yet ... my first steps met with more thorns than roses!"

Therese chose a spiritual director, Almire Pichon SJ. At their first meeting, 28 May 1888, she made a general confession going back over all her past sins. She came away from it profoundly relieved. The priest who had himself suffered from scruples, understood her and reassured her. A few months later, he left for Canada, and Therese would only be able to ask his advice by letter and his replies were rare. (On 4 July 1897, she confided to Pauline, "Father Pichon treated me too much like a child; however, he also did me good by telling me that I had not committed a mortal sin." During her time as a postulant, Therese had to endure some bullying from other sisters because of her lack of aptitude for handicrafts and manual work. Sister St Vincent de Paul, the finest embroiderer in the community, made her feel awkward and even called her "the big nanny goat". Therese was in fact the tallest in the family at 1.62 m (5 ft 4 in). Like all nuns, Therese discovered the ups and downs related to differences in temperament, character, problems of sensitivities or infirmities. But the greatest suffering came from outside Carmel. On 23 June 1888, Louis Martin disappeared from his home and was found days later, in the post office in Le Havre. The incident marked the onset of her father's decline, which would end with his death on July 29, 1894.

=== Novitiate ===
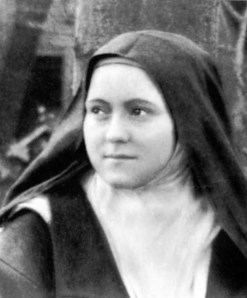
Photograph of Therese, c. 1888–1896

The end of Therese's time as a postulant arrived on January 10, 1889, with her taking of the habit. From that time she wore the "rough homespun and brown scapular, white wimple and veil, leather belt with rosary, woollen 'stockings', rope sandals". Her father's health having temporarily stabilized he was able to attend, though twelve days after her ceremony her father suffered a stroke and was taken to a private sanatorium, the Bon Sauveur at Caen, where he remained for three years before returning to Lisieux in 1892. In this period Therese deepened the sense of her vocation; to lead a hidden life, to pray and offer her suffering for priests, to forget herself, to increase discreet acts of charity. She wrote, "I applied myself especially to practice little virtues, not having the facility to perform great ones ... In her letters from this period of her novitiate, Therese returned over and over to the theme of littleness, referring to herself as a grain of sand, an image she borrowed from Pauline… 'Always littler, lighter, in order to be lifted more easily by the breeze of love'. The remainder of her life would be defined by retreat and subtraction".

She absorbed the work of John of the Cross, spiritual reading uncommon at the time, especially for such a young nun. "Oh! what insights I have gained from the works of our holy father, St. John of the Cross! When I was seventeen and eighteen, I had no other spiritual nourishment…" She felt a kinship with this classic writer of the Carmelite Order (though nothing seems to have drawn her to the writing of Teresa of Ávila), and with enthusiasm she read his works, The Ascent of Mount Carmel, the Way of Purification, the Spiritual Canticle, the Living Flame of Love. Passages from these writings are woven into everything she herself said and wrote. The fear of God, which she found in certain sisters, paralyzed her. "My nature is such that fear makes me recoil, with LOVE not only do I go forward, I fly".

With the new name a Carmelite receives when she enters the order, there is always an epithet – for example, Teresa of Jesus, Elizabeth of the Trinity, Anne of the Angels. The epithet singles out the Mystery which she is supposed to contemplate with special devotion. "Therese's names in religion – she had two – must be taken together to define their religious significance". The first name was promised to her at nine, by Mother Marie de Gonzague, of the Child Jesus, and was given to her on her entry to the convent. In itself, veneration of the childhood of Jesus was a Carmelite heritage of the seventeenth century – it concentrated upon the staggering humiliation of divine majesty in assuming the shape of extreme weakness and helplessness. The French Oratory of Jesus and Pierre de Bérulle renewed this old devotional practice. Yet when she received the veil, Therese took the second name of the Holy Face.

During the course of her novitiate, contemplation of the Holy Face was said to have nourished her inner life. This is an image representing the disfigured face of Jesus during the Passion. She meditated on certain passages from the prophet Isaiah (Chapter 53). Six weeks before her death she remarked to Pauline, "The words in Isaiah: 'no stateliness here, no majesty, no beauty, ... one despised, left out of all human reckoning; How should we take any account of him, a man so despised (Is 53:2–3) – these words were the basis of my whole worship of the Holy Face. I, too, wanted to be without comeliness and beauty, unknown to all creatures." On the eve of her profession she wrote to Sister Marie, "Tomorrow I shall be the bride of Jesus 'whose face was hidden and whom no man knew' – what a union and what a future!". The meditation also helped her understand the humiliating situation of her father.

Usually the novitiate preceding profession lasted a year. Sister Therese hoped to make her final commitment on or after 11 January 1890 but, considered still too young for a final commitment, her profession was postponed. She would spend eight months longer than the standard year as an unprofessed novice. As 1889 ended, her old home in the world, Les Buissonnets, was dismantled, the furniture divided among the Guérins and the Carmel. It was not until 8 September 1890, aged 17-and-a-half, that she made her religious profession. The retreat in anticipation of her "irrevocable promises" was characterized by "absolute aridity" and on the eve of her profession she gave way to panic. She worried that "What she wanted was beyond her. Her vocation was a sham".

Reassured by the novice mistress and mother Marie de Gonzague, the next day her religious profession went ahead, "an outpouring of peace flooded my soul, "that peace which surpasseth all understanding" (Phil. 4:7)". Against her heart she wore her letter of profession written during her retreat. "May creatures be nothing for me, and may I be nothing for them, but may You, Jesus, be everything! Let nobody be occupied with me, let me be looked upon as one to be trampled underfoot ... may Your will be done in me perfectly… Jesus, allow me to save very many souls; let no soul be lost today; let all the souls in purgatory be saved…" On September 24, the public ceremony followed filled with 'sadness and bitterness'. "Thérèse found herself young enough, alone enough, to weep over the absence of Bishop Hugonin, Père Pichon, in Canada; and her own father, still confined in the asylum". But Mother Marie de Gonzague wrote to the prioress of Tours, "The angelic child is seventeen and a half, and she has the judgment of one of thirty, the religious perfection of an old perfected novice, and possession of herself; she is a perfect nun."

=== Life as a Carmelite ===
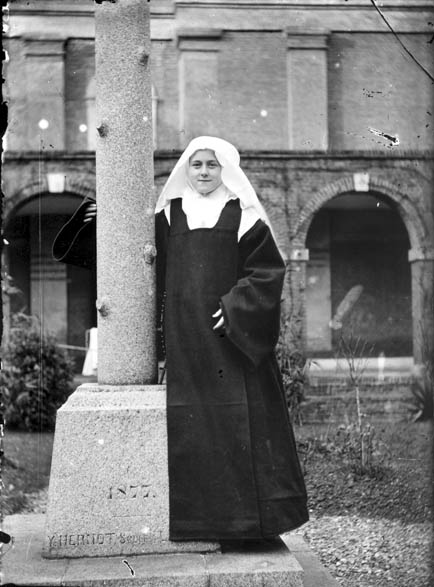
Portrait of Therese, c. 1889

The years which followed were a maturation. Therese prayed without great sensitive emotions, she increased the small acts of charity and care for others, doing small services. She accepted criticism in silence, even unjust criticisms, and smiled at the sisters who were unpleasant to her. She always prayed for priests, and in particular for Hyacinthe Loyson, a priest who had been a Sulpician and a Dominican novice, then a Carmelite for ten years, but had withdrawn from the Catholic Church in 1870. Two years later he married a Protestant widow whom he had brought to Catholicism years ago. After his excommunication, he continued to travel around France giving lectures. While clerical papers called Loyson a "renegade" and Léon Bloy lampooned him, Therese prayed throughout her religious life for the conversion of this former Carmelite whom she called "our brother, a son of the Blessed Virgin". She offered her last communion, 19 August 1897, for Loyson.

The chaplain to the Carmel, Father Youf, insisted a lot on the fear of Hell. The preachers during spiritual retreats at that time emphasised sin, the sufferings of purgatory, and those of hell. This did not help Therese who in 1891 experienced, "great inner trials of all kinds, even wondering sometimes whether heaven existed". One phrase heard during a sermon made her weep: "No one knows if they are worthy of love or of hate." However the retreat of October 1891 was preached by Father Alexis Prou, a Franciscan from Saint-Nazaire. "He specialized in large crowds (he preached in factories) and did not seem the right person to help Carmelites. Just one of them found comfort in his words, Sister Thérèse of the Child Jesus ... [his] preaching on abandonment and mercy expanded her heart".

This confirmed her own intuitions. She wrote, "My soul was like a book which the priest read better than I did. He launched me full sail on the waves of confidence and love which held such an attraction for me, but upon which I had not dared to venture. He told me that my faults did not offend God." Her spiritual life drew more and more on the Gospels that she carried with her at all times. The piety of her time was fed more on commentaries, but Therese had asked Céline to get the Gospels and the Epistles of St Paul bound into a single small volume which she could carry on her heart. She said, "But it is especially the Gospels which sustain me during my hours of prayer, for in them I find what is necessary for my poor little soul. I am constantly discovering in them new lights, hidden and mysterious meanings."

Over time Therese realised that she felt no attraction to the exalted heights of "great souls". She looked directly for the word of Jesus, which shed light on her prayers and on her daily life. Therese's retreat in October 1892 pointed to a "downward" path for her. If asked where she lived, she would pause and quote, "The foxes have their lairs, the birds of heaven their nests, but I have no place to rest my head." (Matthew 8:20). She wrote to Céline (letter 19 October 1892), "Jesus raised us above all the fragile things of this world whose image passes away. Like Zacchaeus, we climbed a tree to see Jesus and now let us listen to what he is saying to us. Make haste to descend, I must lodge today at your house. Well, Jesus tells us to descend?" "A question here of the interior," she qualified in her letter, lest Céline think she meant renouncing food or shelter. "Thérèse knew her virtues, even her love, to be flawed, flawed by self, a mirror too clouded to reflect the divine." She continued to seek to discover the means, "more efficiently to strip herself of self". "No doubt, [our hearts] are already empty of creatures, but, alas, I feel mine is not entirely empty of myself, and it is for this reason that Jesus tells me to descend."

=== Election of Mother Agnes ===
On 20 February 1893, Pauline was elected prioress of Carmel and became "Mother Agnes". She appointed the former prioress as novice mistress and made Therese her assistant. The work of guiding the novices would fall primarily to Therese. Over the next few years she revealed a talent for clarifying doctrine to those who had not received as much education as she. A kaleidoscope, whose three mirrors transform scraps of coloured paper into beautiful designs, provided an inspired illustration for the Holy Trinity. "As long as our actions, even the smallest, do not fall away from the focus of Divine Love, the Holy Trinity, symbolized by the three mirrors, allows them to reflect wonderful beauty. Jesus, who regards us through the little lens, that is to say, through Himself, always sees beauty in everything we do. But if we left the focus of inexpressible love, what would He see? Bits of straw [...] dirty, worthless actions." "Another cherished image was that of the newly invented elevator, a vehicle Therese used many times over to describe God's grace, a force that lifts us to heights we can't reach on our own." Martha of Jesus, a novice who spent her childhood in a series of orphanages and who was described by all as emotionally unbalanced, with a violent temper, gave witness during the beatification process of the 'unusual dedication and presence of her young teacher. "Thérèse deliberately 'sought out the company of those nuns whose temperaments she found hardest to bear.' What merit was there in acting charitably toward people whom one loved naturally? Thérèse went out of her way to spend time with, and therefore to love, the people she found repellent. It was an effective means of achieving interior poverty, a way to remove a place to rest her head."

In September 1893, Therese, having been a temporarily professed for the standard three years, asked not to be promoted but to continue as novice indefinitely. As a novice she would always have to ask permission of the other sisters with perpetual vows. She would never be elected to any position of importance. Remaining closely associated with the other novices, she could continue to care for her spiritual charges. In 1841 Jules Michelet devoted the major part of the fifth volume of his History of France to a favourable presentation of the epic of Joan of Arc. Félix Dupanloup worked relentlessly for the glorification of Joan who, on 8 May 1429 had liberated Orléans, the city of which he became bishop in 1849. Therese wrote, among others, two plays in honour of her childhood heroine, the first about Joan's response to the heavenly voices calling her to battle, the second about her resulting martyrdom.

1894 brought a national celebration of Joan of Arc. On 27 January, Leo XIII authorized the introduction of her cause of beatification, declaring Joan, the shepherdess from Lorraine venerable. Therese used Henri-Alexandre Wallon's history of Joan of Arc – a book her uncle Isidore had given to the Carmel – to help her write two plays, "pious recreations", "small theatrical pieces performed by a few nuns for the rest of the community, on the occasion of certain feast days". The first of these, The Mission of Joan of Arc, was performed at the Carmel on 21 January 1894, and the second, Joan of Arc Accomplishes her Mission, exactly one year later, on 21 January 1895. In the estimation of one of her biographers, Ida Görres, they "are scarcely veiled self-portraits". On 29 July 1894, Louis Martin died.

=== The "little way" ===
Therese entered the Carmel of Lisieux with the determination to become a saint. However, by the end of 1894, six years as a Carmelite made her realize how small and insignificant she felt. She saw the limitations of all her efforts. She remained small and very far off from the unfailing love that she would wish to practice. She is said to have understood then that it was from insignificance that she had to learn to ask God's help. Along with her camera, Céline had brought notebooks with her, passages from the Old Testament, which Therese did not have in Carmel. (The Louvain Bible, the translation authorized for French Catholics, did not include the Old Testament.) In the notebooks Therese found a passage from Proverbs that struck her with particular force: "Whosoever is a little one, let him come to me" (Proverbs 9:4).

Therese was struck by another passage from the Book of Isaiah: "you shall be carried at the breasts, and upon the knees they shall caress you. As one whom the mother caresseth, so will I comfort you". (Isaiah 66:12–13) She concluded that Jesus would carry her to the summit of sanctity. The smallness of Therese, her limits, became in this way grounds for joy, rather than discouragement. Not until Manuscript C of her autobiography did she give this discovery the name of "little way", "petite voie".

I will seek out a means of getting to Heaven by a little way – very short and very straight little way that is wholly new. We live in an age of inventions; nowadays the rich need not trouble to climb the stairs, they have lifts instead. Well, I mean to try and find a lift by which I may be raised unto God, for I am too tiny to climb the steep stairway of perfection ... Thine Arms, then, O Jesus, are the lift which must raise me up even unto Heaven. To get there I need not grow. On the contrary, I must remain little, I must become still less

In her quest for sanctity and in order to attain holiness and to express her love of God, Therese believed that it was not necessary to accomplish heroic acts or great deeds. She wrote, "Love proves itself by deeds, so how am I to show my love? Great deeds are forbidden me. The only way I can prove my love is by scattering flowers and these flowers are every little sacrifice, every glance and word, and the doing of the least actions for love."

The "little way" of Therese is the foundation of her spirituality. Within the Catholic Church Therese's way was known for some time as "the little way of spiritual childhood", but Therese actually wrote "little way" only three times, and she never wrote the phrase "spiritual childhood." It was her sister Pauline who, after Therese's death, adopted the phrase "the little way of spiritual childhood" to interpret Therese's path. In May 1897, Therese wrote to Father Adolphe Roulland, "... my way is entirely one of trust and love ..." and:

Sometimes when I read certain spiritual treatises in which perfection is shown through a thousand obstacles, surrounded by a host of illusions, my poor mind gets tired very quickly, I close the learned book which breaks my head and dries up my heart and I take the Holy Scripture. So everything seems luminous to me, a single word reveals infinite horizons to my soul, perfection seems easy to me, I see that it suffices to recognize one's nothingness and to abandon oneself like a child in the arms of the Good Lord. Leaving to great souls, to great minds the beautiful books that I cannot understand, let alone put into practice, I rejoice in being little since only children and those who look like them will be admitted to the celestial banquet.

=== Merciful love ===
At the end of the second play that Therese had written on Joan of Arc, the costume she wore almost caught fire. The alcohol stoves used to represent the stake at Rouen set fire to the screen behind which Therese stood. Therese did not flinch but the incident marked her. The theme of fire would assume an increasing importance in her writings. On 9 June 1895, during a Mass celebrating the feast of the Holy Trinity, Therese had a sudden inspiration that she must offer herself as a sacrificial victim to the merciful love. At this time some nuns offered themselves as a victim to God's justice. In her cell she drew up an "Act of Oblation" for herself and for Céline, and on 11 June, the two of them knelt before the miraculous Virgin and Therese read the document she had written and signed. "In the evening of this life, I shall appear before You with empty hands, for I do not ask You Lord to count my works."

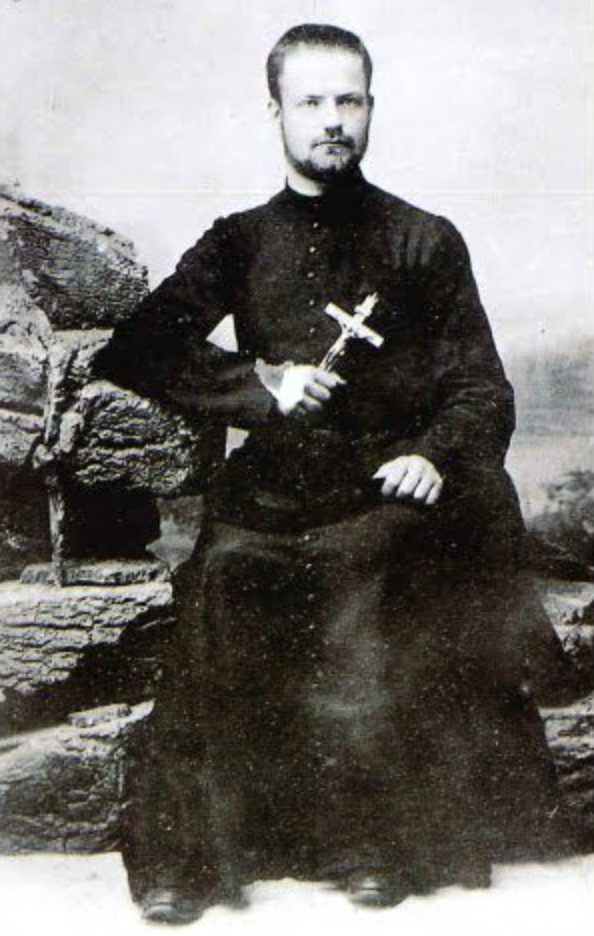
Father Adolphe Roulland of the Society of Foreign Missions

According to biographer Ida Görres, the document echoed the happiness she had felt when Father Alexis Prou, the Franciscan preacher, had assured her that her faults did not cause God sorrow. In the Oblation she wrote, "If through weakness I should chance to fall, may a glance from Your Eyes straightway cleanse my soul, and consume all my imperfections – as fire transforms all things into itself". In August 1895 the four Martin sisters were joined in the convent by their cousin, Marie Guerin, who became Sister Marie of the Eucharist. Léonie, after several attempts, became Sister Françoise-Thérèse, a nun in the Order of the Visitation of Holy Mary in Caen, where she died in 1941.

At age 14, Therese understood her vocation was to pray for priests, to be "an apostle to apostles". In September 1890, at her canonical examination before she professed her religious vows, she was asked why she had come to Carmel. She answered "I came to save souls, and especially to pray for priests". Throughout her life she prayed fervently for priests, and she corresponded with and prayed for a young priest, Adolphe Roulland, and a young seminarian, Maurice Bellière. She wrote to her sister "Our mission as Carmelites is to form evangelical workers who will save thousands of souls whose mothers we shall be."

In October 1895 a young seminarian and subdeacon of the White Fathers, Maurice Bellière, asked the Carmel of Lisieux for a nun who would support – by prayer and sacrifice – his missionary work, and the souls that were in the future to be entrusted to him. Mother Agnes designated Therese. She never met Bellière but ten letters passed between them. A year later, Adolphe Roulland (1870–1934) of the Paris Foreign Missions Society requested the same service of the Carmel of Lisieux, before entering the mission field of Sichuan, West China. Once more Therese was assigned the duties of "spiritual sister". "It is quite clear that Therese, in spite of all her reverence for the priestly office, in both cases felt herself to be the teacher and the giver. It is she who consoles and warns, encourages and praises, answers questions, offers corroboration, and instructs the priests in the meaning of her little way".

=== Final years ===
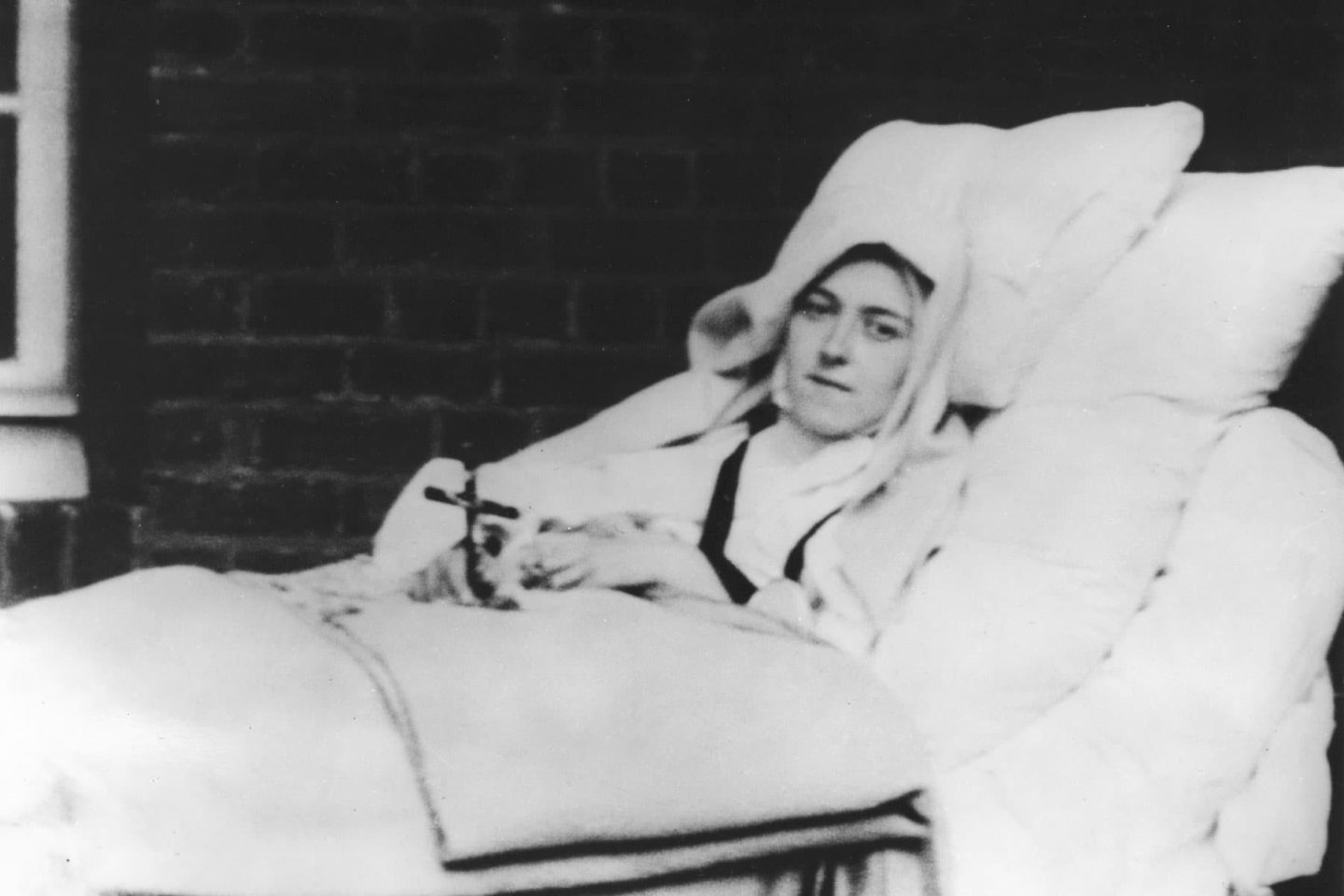
Therese in bed during the last stage of her illness

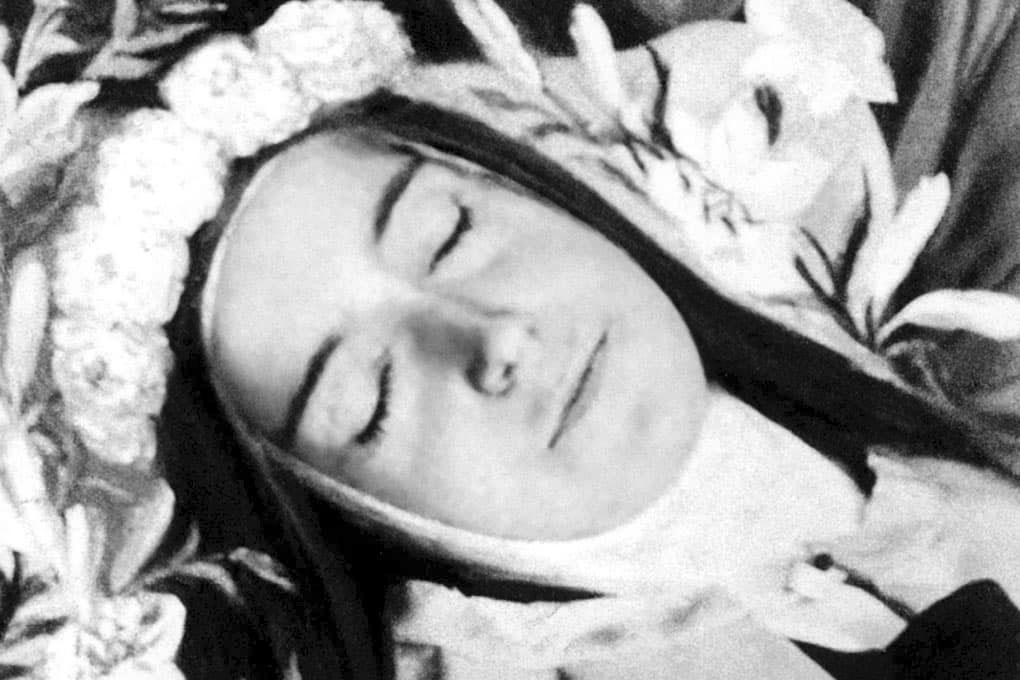
Close-up photograph after her death

Therese's final years were marked by a steady decline that she bore resolutely and without complaint. Tuberculosis was the key element of Therese's final suffering, but it's said that she saw that as part of her spiritual journey. After observing a rigorous Lenten fast in 1896, she went to bed on the eve of Good Friday and felt a joyous sensation. She wrote: "Oh! how sweet this memory really is! ... I had scarcely laid my head upon the pillow when I felt something like a bubbling stream mounting to my lips. I didn't know what it was." The next morning her handkerchief was soaked in blood and she understood her fate. Coughing up of blood meant tuberculosis, and tuberculosis meant death. She wrote, "I thought immediately of the joyful thing that I had to learn, so I went over to the window. I was able to see that I was not mistaken. Ah! my soul was filled with a great consolation; I was interiorly persuaded that Jesus, on the anniversary of His own death, wanted to have me hear His first call!"

Therese corresponded with a Carmelite mission in what was then French Indochina and was invited to join them, but, because of her sickness, could not travel. Tuberculosis slowly devoured her flesh. When she was near death, "her physical suffering kept increasing so that even the doctor himself was driven to exclaim, 'Ah! If you only knew what this young nun was suffering!'" During the last hours of Therese's life, she said, "I would never have believed it was possible to suffer so much, never, never!" In July 1897, she made a final move to the monastery infirmary. On 19 August 1897, she received her last communion. She died on 30 September 1897, aged 24. On her deathbed, she is reported to have said, "I have reached the point of not being able to suffer any more, because all suffering is sweet to me." Her last words were, "My God, I love you!"

Therese was buried on 4 October 1897, in the Carmelite plot, in the municipal cemetery at Lisieux, where her parents had been buried. Her body was exhumed in September 1910 and the remains placed in a lead coffin and transferred to another tomb. In March 1923, however, before she was beatified, her body was returned to the Carmel of Lisieux, where it remains. The figure of Therese in the glass coffin is not her actual body but a gisant statue based on drawings and photos by Céline after Therese's death. It contains her ribcage and other remnants of her body.

== Spirituality ==
Therese of Lisieux is one of the most popular Catholic saints since apostolic times. She is approachable, due in part to her historical proximity. Barbara Stewart, writing for The New York Times, once called Therese "the Emily Dickinson of Roman Catholic sainthood". As a Doctor of the Church, she is the subject of much theological comment and study, and, she remained as the focus of much devotion. She influenced the Catholics in the first half of the twentieth century because of the simplicity and practicality of her approach to the spiritual life.

Therese was devoted to Eucharistic adoration and on 26 February 1895, shortly before she died wrote from memory and without a rough draft her poetic masterpiece To Live by Love which she had composed during Eucharistic adoration. During her life, the poem was sent to various religious communities and was included in a notebook of her poems.

Therese lived a hidden life and "wanted to be unknown", yet became popular after her death through her spiritual autobiography. She also left letters, poems, religious plays, prayers, and her last conversations were recorded by her sisters. Paintings and photographs – mostly the work of her sister Céline – further led to her becoming known. Therese said on her death-bed, "I only love simplicity. I have a horror of pretence", and she spoke out against some of the claims made concerning the lives of saints written in her day, "We should not say improbable things, or things we do not know. We must see their real, and not their imagined lives". The depth of her spirituality, of which she said, "my way is all confidence and love", has inspired many believers up to the current day. In the face of her littleness she trusted to God her sanctity. She wanted to go to heaven by an entirely new little way. "I wanted to find an elevator that would raise me to Jesus". The elevator, she wrote, would be the arms of Jesus lifting her in all her littleness.

=== Story of a Soul ===
Therese is best known today for her spiritual memoir, Histoire d'une âme (Story of a Soul). It is a compilation of three separate manuscripts. The first, in 1895 is a memoir of her childhood, written under obedience to the Prioress, Mother Agnes of Jesus, her older sister Pauline. Mother Agnes gave the order after being prompted by their eldest sister, Sister Marie of the Sacred Heart.

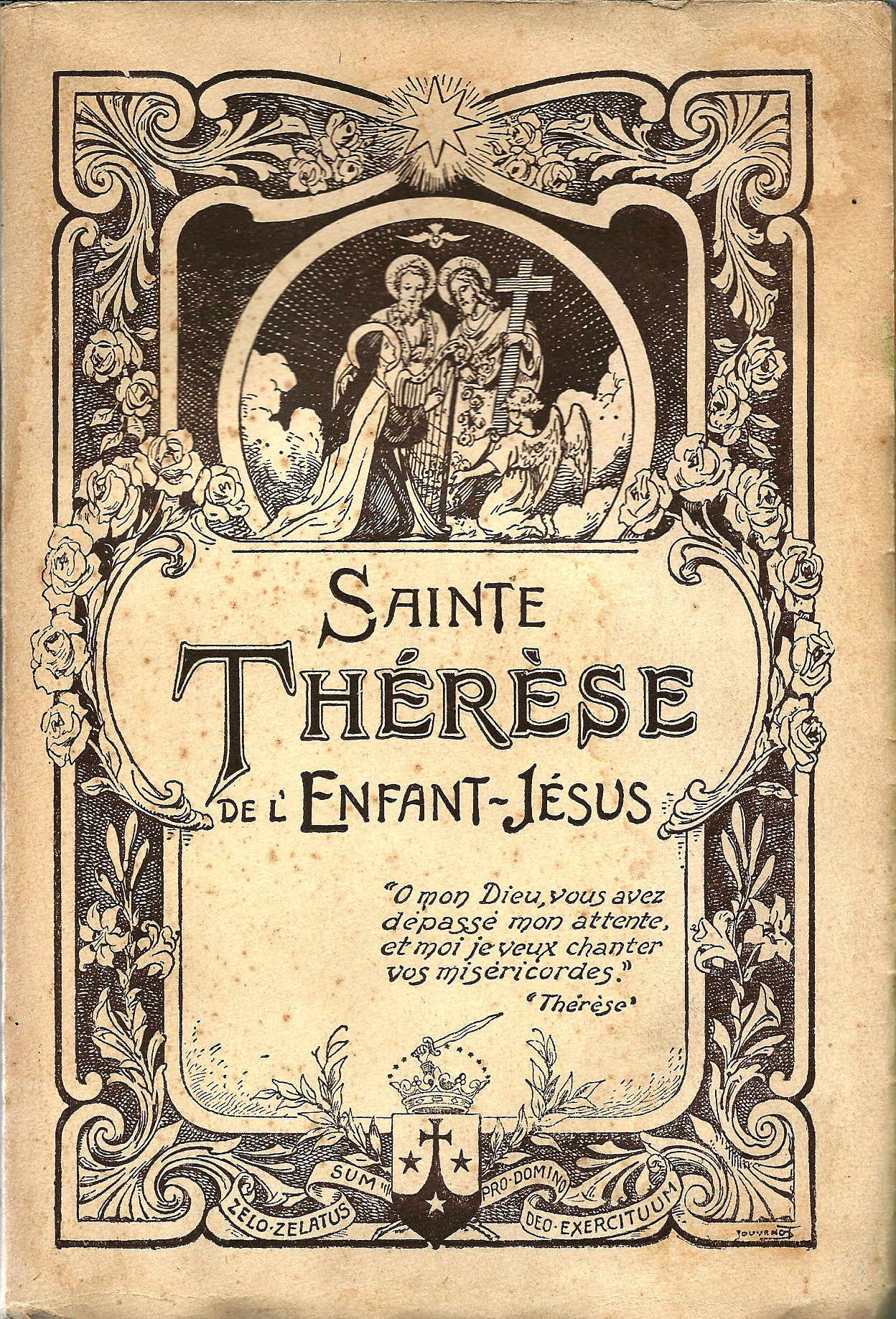
Cover page of Story of a Soul (Histoire d'une Âme), 1940 edition

The second is a three-page letter, written in September 1896, at the request of her eldest sister Marie, who, aware of the seriousness of Therese's illness, asked her to set down her "little doctrine". In June 1897, Mother Agnes asked Mother Marie de Gonzague, who had succeeded her as prioress, to allow Therese to write another memoir with more details of her religious life (ostensibly as a help in the later composition of an anticipated obituary).

While on her deathbed Therese made a number of references to the book's future appeal and benefit to souls. She authorized Pauline to make any changes deemed necessary. It was heavily edited by Pauline (Mother Agnes), who made more than seven thousand revisions to Therese's manuscript and presented it as a biography of her sister. Aside from considerations of style, Mother Marie de Gonzague had ordered Pauline to alter the first two sections of the manuscript to make them appear as if they were addressed to Mother Marie as well. The book was published on 21 October 1898 and was sent out as the customary "circular" advising other Carmels of a nun's death and requesting their prayers; however, it received a much wider circulation, as copies were lent out and passed around.

Since 1973, two centenary editions of Terese's original, unedited manuscripts, including The Story of a Soul, her letters, poems, prayers and the plays she wrote for the monastery recreations have been published in French. ICS Publications has issued a complete critical edition of her writings: Story of a Soul, Last Conversations, and the two volumes of her letters were translated by John Clarke, OCD; The Poetry of Saint Thérèse by Donald Kinney, OCD; The Prayers of St. Thérèse by Alethea Kane, OCD; and The Religious Plays of St. Thérèse of Lisieux by David Dwyer and Susan Conroy.

=== Holy Face of Jesus devotion ===
The devotion to the Holy Face of Jesus was promoted by another Carmelite nun, Sister Marie of St Peter in Tours, France in 1844. Then by Leo Dupont, also known as the Apostle of the Holy Face who formed the Archconfraternity of the Holy Face in Tours in 1851. Therese joined this confraternity on 26 April 1885. Her parents, Louis and Zélie Martin, had also prayed at the Oratory of the Holy Face, originally established by Dupont in Tours. This devotion to the Holy Face of Jesus was based on images of the Veil of Veronica, as promoted by Dupont, rather than the Shroud of Turin, which image first appeared on a photographic negative in 1898.

On 10 January 1889, she was given the habit and received the name Therese of the Child Jesus. On 8 September 1890, Therese made her vows. The ceremony of "taking the veil" followed on the 24th, when she added to her religious name of the Holy Face, an attribute which was to become increasingly important in the development and character of her inner life. In his "A l'ecole de Therese de Lisieux: maitresse de la vie spirituelle", Bishop Guy Gaucher emphasizes that Therese saw the devotions to the Child Jesus and to the Holy Face as so completely linked that she signed herself "Thérèse de l'Enfant Jesus de la Sainte Face". In her poem My Heaven down here, composed in 1895, Therese expressed the notion that by the divine union of love, the soul takes on the semblance of Christ. By contemplating the sufferings associated with the Holy Face of Jesus, she felt she could become closer to Christ.

Therese composed a Consecration to the Holy Face, August 6, 1896, for herself and two other nuns in the Carmel: Geneviève of St Teresa (her biological sister Céline) and Sr Marie of the Trinity. The introduction to the consecration begins, "For a little of this pure Love is more beneficial to the church than all these other works put together... Thus it is of the greatest importance that our souls be exercised much in Love so that being consumed quickly we do not linger long here on earth but soon attain to the vision of Jesus, Face to Face." This consecration greatly affected these 3 nuns, who added "...and the Holy Face" to their religious names. Sister Marie Agnès changed her name to Sister Marie of the Trinity and of the Holy Face and Céline years later (on November 14, 1916) received permission (from Mother Agnes of Jesus (Pauline)) to change her name to "Sister Genevieve of the Holy Face and of Saint Teresa" and is now most commonly known as Sr Genevieve of the Holy Face.

Therese wrote several prayers expressing her draw to Christ's Holy Face in his passion, reflecting her desire to be like Jesus and suffer for the sake of love. She wrote a Canticle to the Holy Face in August 1895 (2 years before her death) saying: "Jesus, Your ineffable image is the star that guides my steps. Ah! You know, Your sweet Face is for me Heaven on earth. My love discovers the charms of Your Face adorned with tears. I smile through my own tears when I contemplate Your sorrows."

Therese emphasized God's mercy in both the birth (Child Jesus) and the passion (Holy Face) narratives in the Gospel. She wrote, "He sees it [his face] disfigured, covered with blood! … unrecognizable! … And yet the divine Child does not tremble; this is what He chooses to show His love". She composed the Holy Face Prayer for Sinners: "Eternal Father, since Thou hast given me for my inheritance the adorable Face of Thy Divine Son, I offer that face to Thee and I beg Thee, in exchange for this coin of infinite value, to forget the ingratitude of souls dedicated to Thee and to pardon all poor sinners." Over the decades, her poems and prayers helped to spread the devotion to the Holy Face of Jesus.

== Recognition ==
=== Canonization ===
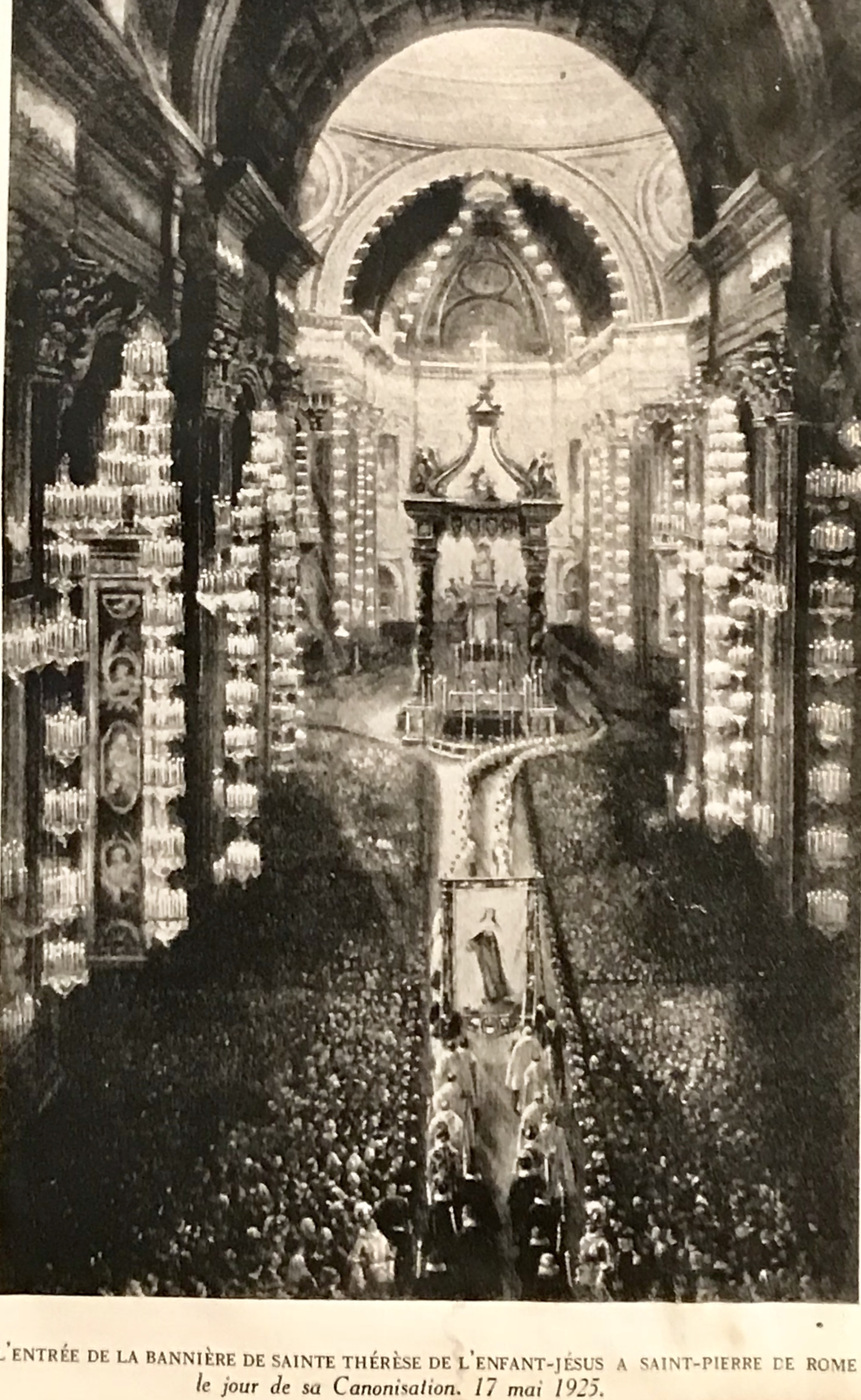
The canonization of Saint Therese in Saint Peter's Basilica, Rome

The impact of The Story of a Soul, a collection of her autobiographical manuscripts, printed and distributed a year after her death to an initially very limited audience, was significant. Pope Pius XI declared her the "star of his pontificate". Pope Pius X signed the decree for the opening of the process of canonization on 10 June 1914. Pope Benedict XV, in order to hasten the process, dispensed with the usual fifty-year delay required between death and beatification. On 14 August 1921, he promulgated the decree on the heroic virtues of Therese declaring her venerable. She was beatified on 29 April 1923.

Therese was canonized on 17 May 1925 by Pope Pius XI, only 28 years after her death. She was declared a saint five years and a day after Joan of Arc. However, the 1925 celebration for Therese "far outshone" that for the legendary heroine of France. At the time, Pope Pius XI revived the old custom of covering St. Peter's with torches and tallow lamps. According to one account, "Ropes, lamps and tallows were pulled from the dusty storerooms where they had been packed away for 55 years. A few old workmen who remembered how it was done the last time – in 1870 – directed 300 men for two weeks as they climbed about fastening lamps to St. Peter's dome." The New York Times ran a front-page story about the occasion titled, "All Rome Admires St. Peter's Aglow for a New Saint". According to the Times, over 60,000 people, estimated to be the largest crowd inside St. Peter's Basilica since the coronation of Pope Pius X, 22 years before, witnessed the canonization ceremonies. In the evening, 500,000 pilgrims pressed into the lit square.

Therese rapidly became one of the most popular saints of the twentieth century. Her feast day was added to the General Roman Calendar in 1927 for celebration on 3 October. In 1969, 42 years later, Pope Paul VI moved it to 1 October, the day after her dies natalis (birthday to heaven). Therese of Lisieux is the patroness saint of aviators, florists, illness(es) and missions. Pope Pius XI made her also the patroness saint of Russian Catholics, as he declared her the co-patroness of Sant'Antonio Abate all'Esquilino – which had been attributed to the Russian Catholics – and established Therese's feast day to be celebrated there in the Slavic rite on the anniversary of her canonization on 17 May.

=== Other recognition ===
In 1927, Pope Pius XI named Saint Therese co-patroness of the missions, with Saint Francis Xavier. In 1944, Pope Pius XII decreed her a co-patroness of France with Joan of Arc. By the apostolic letter Divini Amoris Scientia (The Science of Divine Love) of 19 October 1997, Pope John Paul II declared Therese a Doctor of the Church, one of four women so named, the others being Teresa of Ávila, Catherine of Siena and Hildegard of Bingen. Devotion to Therese has developed around the world. According to some biographies of Édith Piaf, in 1922 the singer – at the time, an unknown seven-year-old girl – was cured from blindness after a pilgrimage to the grave of Therese, who at the time was not yet formally canonized. In 2022, official commemoration of the life of Therese was added to the liturgical calendar of the Episcopal Church in the United States, with a feast day on 1 October.

=== Canonization of her parents ===
Zélie and Louis Martin were the first spouses to be proposed for canonization as a couple and the first to be canonized together. In 2004, the Archbishop of Milan accepted the unexpected cure of Pietro Schiliro, an Italian child born near Milan in 2002 with a lung disorder, as a miracle attributable to their intercession. Announced by Cardinal Saraiva Martins on 12 July 2008, at the ceremonies marking the 150th anniversary of the marriage of the Venerable Zélie and Louis Martin, their beatification as a couple took place in Lisieux on 19 October 2008.

In 2011, the letters of Blessed Zélie and Louis Martin were published in English as A Call to a Deeper Love: The Family Correspondence of the Parents of Saint Therese of the Child Jesus, 1863–1885. On 7 January 2013, in Valencia, Spain, the diocesan process opened to examine a "presumed miracle" attributed to their intercession: the healing of a newborn girl, Carmen Pérez Pons, who was born prematurely four days after their beatification and who inexplicably recovered from severe bleeding of the brain and other complications. On 21 May 2013, the diocesan process to examine the miracle closed and the dossier was sent to the Congregation for the Causes of Saints in Rome. Louis and Zélie Martin were canonized on 18 October 2015.

=== Canonization cause of her sister Léonie ===
Therese's older sister, Léonie Martin, the only one of the five sisters who did not become a Carmelite, is also a candidate for sainthood. Léonie attempted the religious life three times before her fourth and final entrance in 1899 to the convent of the Visitation in Caen. She took the name Sister Françoise-Thérèse and was a fervent disciple of Therese's way. She died in 1941 in Caen, where her tomb in the crypt of the Visitation Monastery may be visited by the public. On 25 March 2012, Mgr Jean-Claude Boulanger, Bishop of Bayeux and Lisieux, granted the imprimatur for a prayer asking that Léonie might be declared venerable. On 2 July 2015, the diocesan inquiry into Léonie's life and possible sanctity was opened at the chapel of the Monastery of the Visitation at Caen. She is now styled Léonie Martin, Servant of God.

== Iconography ==
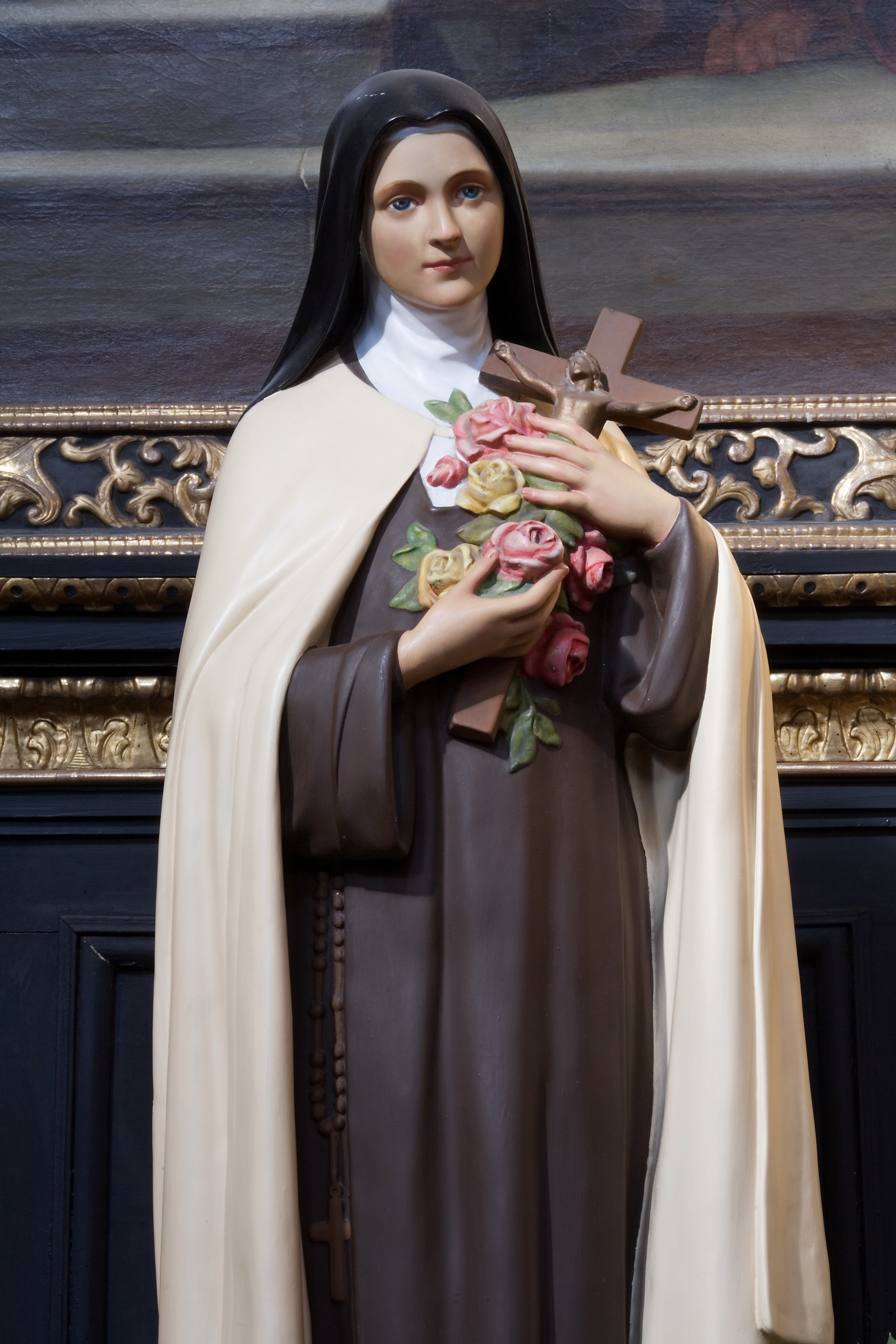
Statue of Saint Therese of Lisieux at the Church of Our Lady Victorious, Prague

=== Symbols ===
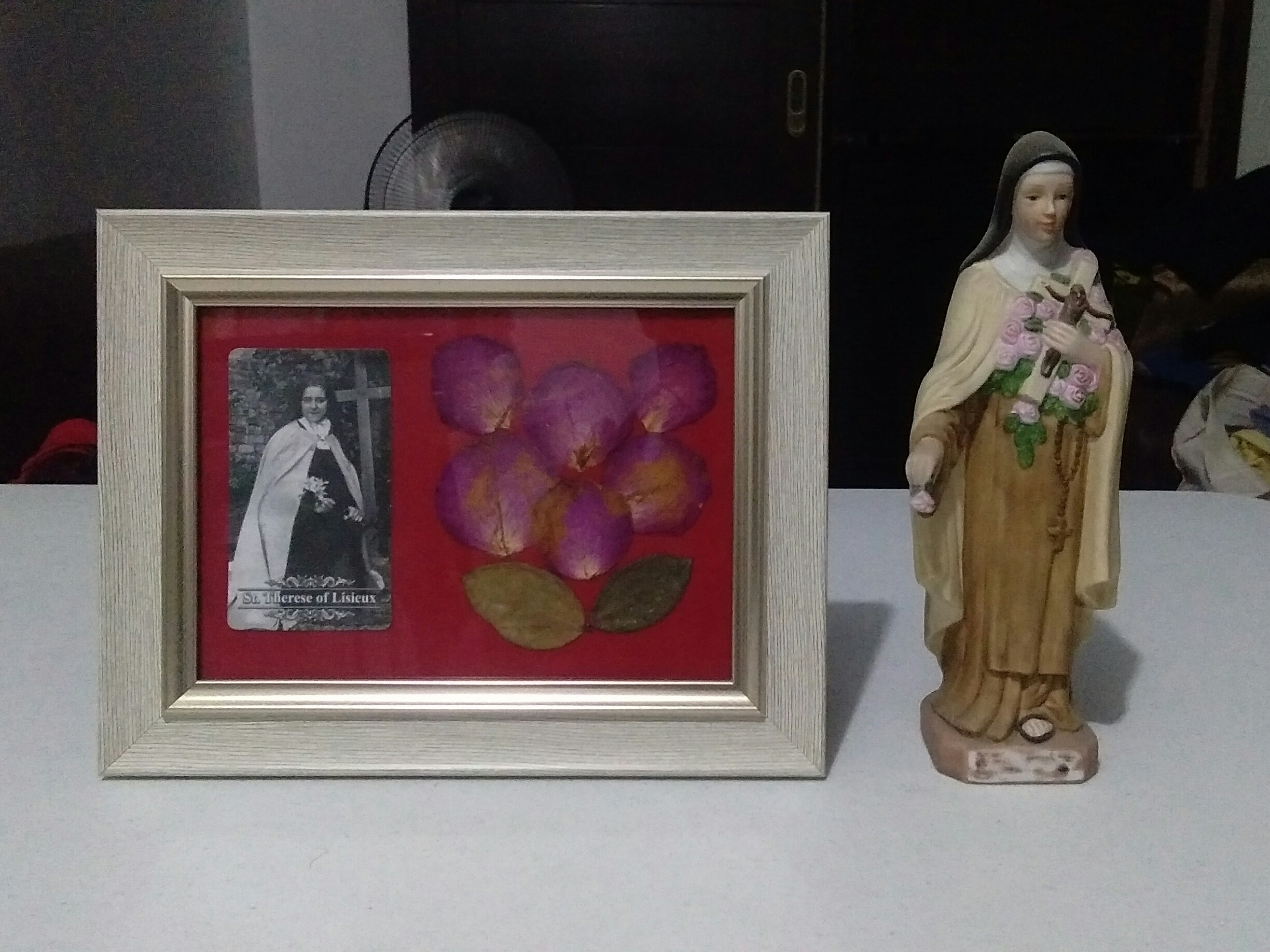
Third class relic of Saint Therese of Lisieux

The roses are the most traditional attribute associated with the iconography Therese of Lisieux. She is often depicted holding roses or surrounded by roses, or throwing roses from heaven, or holding a crucifix covered with roses. In her writings, Therese often used flowers and roses as metaphors, either to refer to herself or to the acts of love she wanted to do. She referred to herself as the "little flower of Jesus" in the garden of God. She often referred to roses as a metaphor for the acts of love she tried to accomplish for God. Novices of the convent reported that Therese said: "After my death, I will let fall a shower of roses", with roses being the symbols of the graces and blessings that she would be able to send to earth when she would be in heaven.

=== Artwork ===
As Céline Martin, one of Therese's sisters who also entered the Carmel of Lisieux as Sister Genevieve, was an artist, she painted several portraits of her sister to help spread her devotion. Céline's portraits of Therese were widely reproduced in devotional images and objects, such as prayer cards. They were also used as illustrations in several editions of Story of a Soul, her autobiography, and in books about Therese published by the Carmel of Lisieux.

Céline's artwork include a famous portrait of Therese holding a crucifix and a bouquet of roses, made in 1912 and called Thérèse aux roses ("Therese with roses"). She drew this portrait because she remembered Therese unpetalling roses on her crucifix when she was lying in bed in the infirmary. It was almost considered as an "official portrait" as it was spread on a very large scale, with huge success among devotees, establishing Therese's iconography.

=== Photographs ===
When Céline Martin joined her younger sister Therese and their two older sisters in the Carmel of Lisieux in 1894, she obtained permission to bring her photographic equipment with her and to take pictures. Between 1894 and 1897, she took 41 known photographs of Therese, both alone and with other Carmelites, being the only known photographs of her during the last years of her life. All other photographs of Therese were taken earlier, four during her childhood and two as a novice. All these photographs have been kept in the archives of the Carmel of Lisieux.

Only highly retouched photographs were made public until the death of Céline Martin, as the Carmel of Lisieux wanted Therese's iconography to be more consistent with the traditional representation of saints. Céline, who was also the main artist creating images of her sister, believed that her artwork was a more accurate portrayal of her sister than the photographs she had taken and considered that the photos needed to be edited to better reflect Therese's face and soul. After Céline died in 1959, all the photographs she had taken of Therese in the Carmel were released unedited, finally showing Therese's "real face".

=== Statues ===
After Therese was beatified in 1923, her veneration was authorized, making it possible for the Carmel of Lisieux to sell statues of Therese to churches and individuals. The Carmel commissioned a statue to Father Marie-Bernard, born Louis Richomme, inspired from the Thérèse aux roses portrait drawn by Céline Martin. It is estimated that over 300,000 copies of this statue have been distributed all over the world. Louis Richomme was also commissioned by the Carmel for over a dozen of other sculptures of Therese, among them the original sculpture for the gisant of Therese, a Therese and the shower of roses located in the crypt of the Lisieux Basilica, and a Therese with her father in the garden of her family house in Lisieux.

== Veneration ==
=== Posthumous devotion ===
Céline Martin entered the Lisieux convent on 14 September 1894. With Mother Agnes' permission, she brought her camera to Carmel, and developing materials. "The indulgence was not by any means usual. Also outside of the normal would be the destiny of those photographs Céline would make in the Carmel, images that would be scrutinized and reproduced too many times to count. Even when the images are poorly reproduced, her eyes arrest us. Described as blue, described as gray, they look darker in photographs. Céline's pictures of her sister contributed to the extraordinary cult of personality that formed in the years after Thérèse's death".

In 1902, the Polish Carmelite Father Raphael Kalinowski translated her autobiography, The Story of a Soul, into Polish. As early as 1912 Father Thomas N. Taylor, a teacher at the Diocese of Glasgow seminary, wrote a short hagiography on Therese, two years before the case for her canonization would be opened. Taylor went on to become a significant proponent of devotion to "The Little Flower" in Scotland. As pastor of St. Francis Xavier Church in Carfin, Lanarkshire, he built a replica of the Grotto at Lourdes and included a small shrine honoring Therese with a statue donated by the Legion of Mary. Carfin became a site of pilgrimages.

=== Memorial sites in Lisieux ===
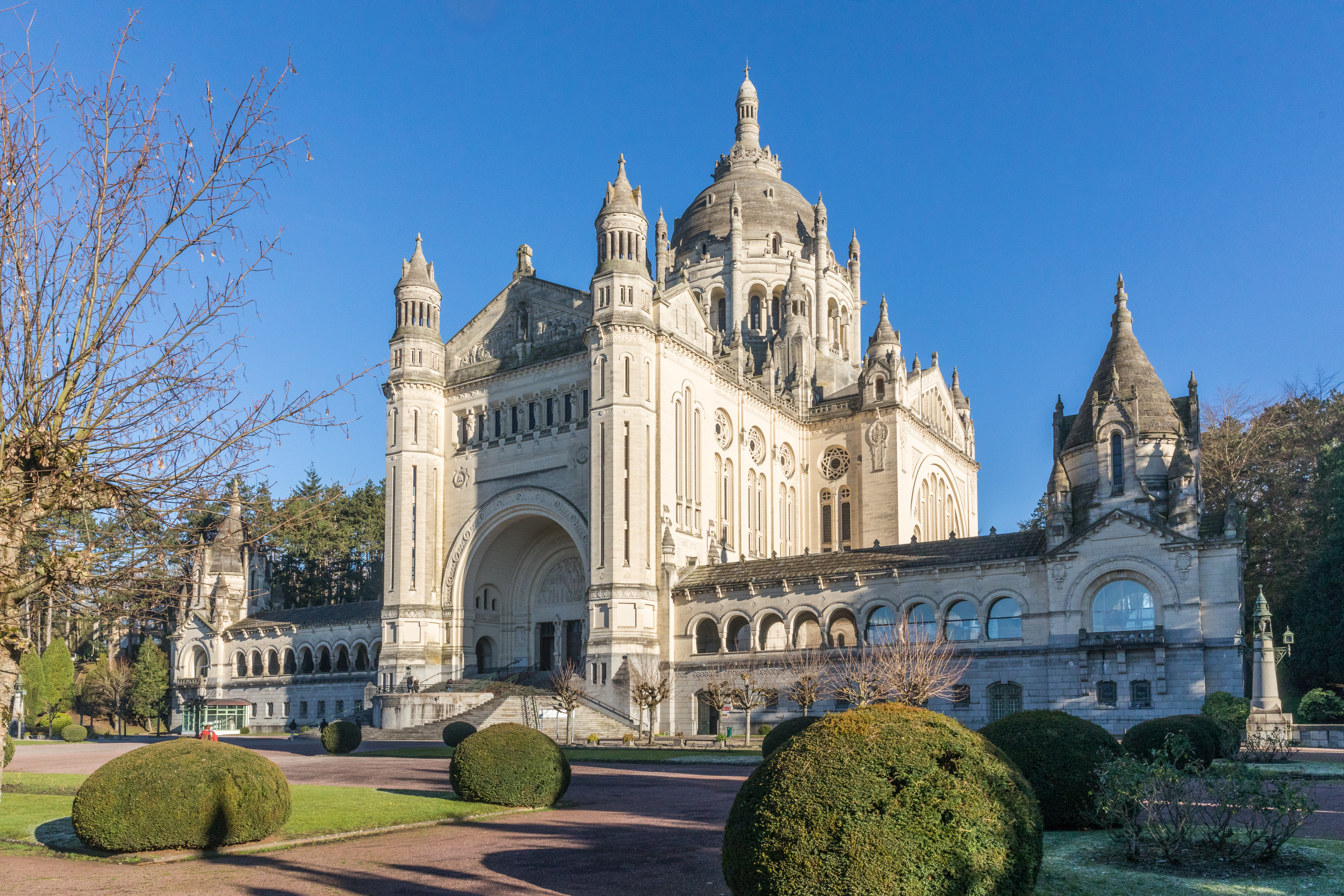
With more than two million visitors a year, the Basilica of St. Thérèse, Lisieux is the second-largest pilgrimage site in France, after Lourdes.

The city of Lisieux, where Thérèse Martin lived for the greater part of her life, is now a pilgrimage center visited by around one million visitors each year. The Basilica of St. Thérèse in Lisieux was consecrated on 11 July 1954 and has become a centre for pilgrims from all over the world. It was originally dedicated in 1937 by Cardinal Eugenio Pacelli, later Pope Pius XII. The basilica can seat 3,000 people.

In addition to the Basilica of St. Thérèse, several places throughout the city commemorate the life of Therese, forming together with the basilica the "sanctuary of Lisieux". The main places of the sanctuary include the Carmel of Lisieux, where her relics were kept, the "Buissonnets" family house where Therese grew up, St. Peter's Cathedral of Lisieux where Therese used to go as a child with her family, the cemetery of Lisieux where Therese was buried before being exhumed when she was beatified. Additionally, there are several buildings in the sanctuary intended to welcome and accommodate pilgrims.

=== Pilgrimage of the relics ===
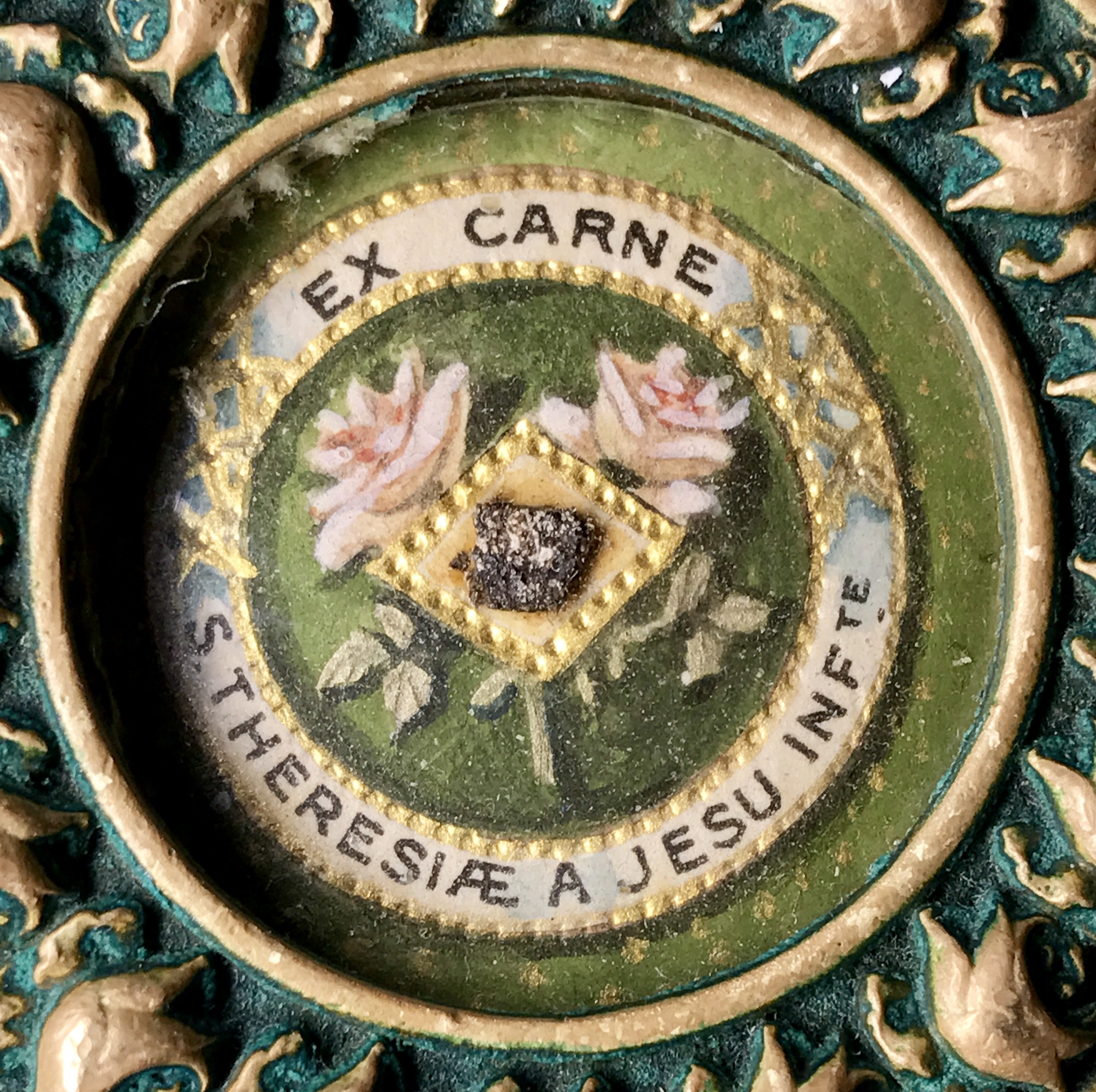
Detail of a first-class carne relic of Saint Therese of Lisieux

The relics of Saint Therese have been on an international pilgrimage since 1994. The tour included not only first-class relics, but also the saint's religious habit, her rosary, and several other items. They were brought to Ireland in the summer of 2001. That same year they travelled to Canada. Although Cardinal Basil Hume had declined to endorse proposals for a tour in 1997, her relics finally visited England and Wales in late September and early October 2009, including an overnight stop at the Anglican York Minster on her feast day, 1 October. A quarter of a million people venerated them.

Ron Garan, who was on the May 31–June 14 Discovery shuttle mission in 2008, took a relic of Saint Therese with him, which had been given to him by the Carmelites of New Caney, Texas. The Carmelites based this on the wish of Therese "to preach the Gospel on all five continents simultaneously and even to the most remote isles". On 27 June 2010, relics of Saint Therese went on their first visit to South Africa in conjunction with the 2010 FIFA World Cup. They remained in the country until October 5, 2010.

The writing-desk Therese used at Carmel (an artifact as opposed to a relic) toured the United States in September and October 2013, sponsored by the Pontifical Mission Societies in the United States. In November 2013, a new reliquary containing the relics of Saint Therese and of her parents, was presented to the Archdiocese of Philadelphia by the Magnificat Foundation. It was first exposed for veneration at the Magnificat Day on 9 November 2013. The National Shrine of St. Therese in Darien, Illinois, has the largest collection of relics and personal artifacts of the saint outside of Lisieux.

=== Churches and shrines ===
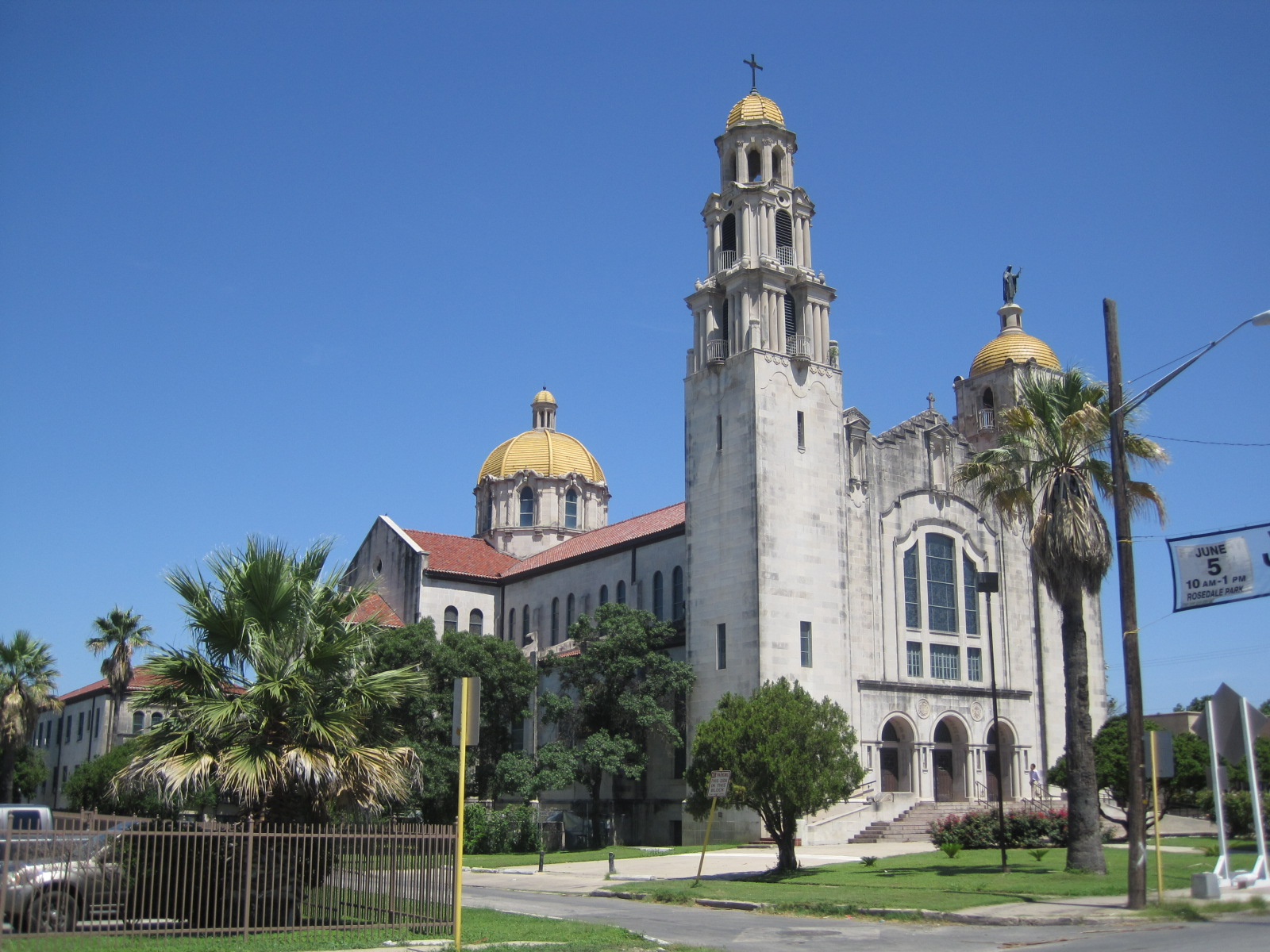
The Basilica of the National Shrine of the Little Flower in San Antonio, Texas, United States, built in 1931.

==== Cathedrals ====
- Saint Theresa of the Child Jesus Cathedral in Honolulu, Hawaii, United States
- St. Therese Cathedral in Bacabal, Brazil
- Cathedral of Saint Theresa of Lisieux in Hamilton, Bermuda
- St. Theresa of the Child Jesus Cathedral in Saitama, Japan
- St. Theresa's Cathedral, Changchun in Changchun, China
- Cathedral of St. Therese of the Child Jesus in Padang, Indonesia
- Cathedral of St. Therese of Lisieux in Sibolga, Indonesia
- St. Theresa's church in Nakandapola, Sri Lanka

==== Basilicas and shrines ====
- Basilica of the National Shrine of the Little Flower in San Antonio, Texas, United States
- Basilica of St Therese of the Child Jesus, Cairo in Cairo, Egypt
- National Shrine of the Little Flower Basilica in Royal Oak, Michigan, United States
- National Shrine of St Therese in Darien, Illinois, United States
- National Shrine of St. Thérèse, Juneau in Juneau, Alaska, United States
- Shrine of St. Therese, Doctor of the Church in Pasay, Philippines
- Diocesan Shrine of Saint Therese of the Child Jesus in Los Baños, Laguna, Philippines
- St. Theresa of the Child Jesus Church and Shrine of the Little Flower in Nasonville, Rhode Island, United States
- Sanctuary of St Theresa, in Birkirkara, Malta
- Archdiocesan Shrine and Parish of St. Therese of the Child Jesus and of the Holy Face, in Santa Teresita, Batangas
- National Shrine and Parish of St. Therese of The Child Jesus, in Antipolo, Rizal

== Legacy ==
=== Religious congregations ===
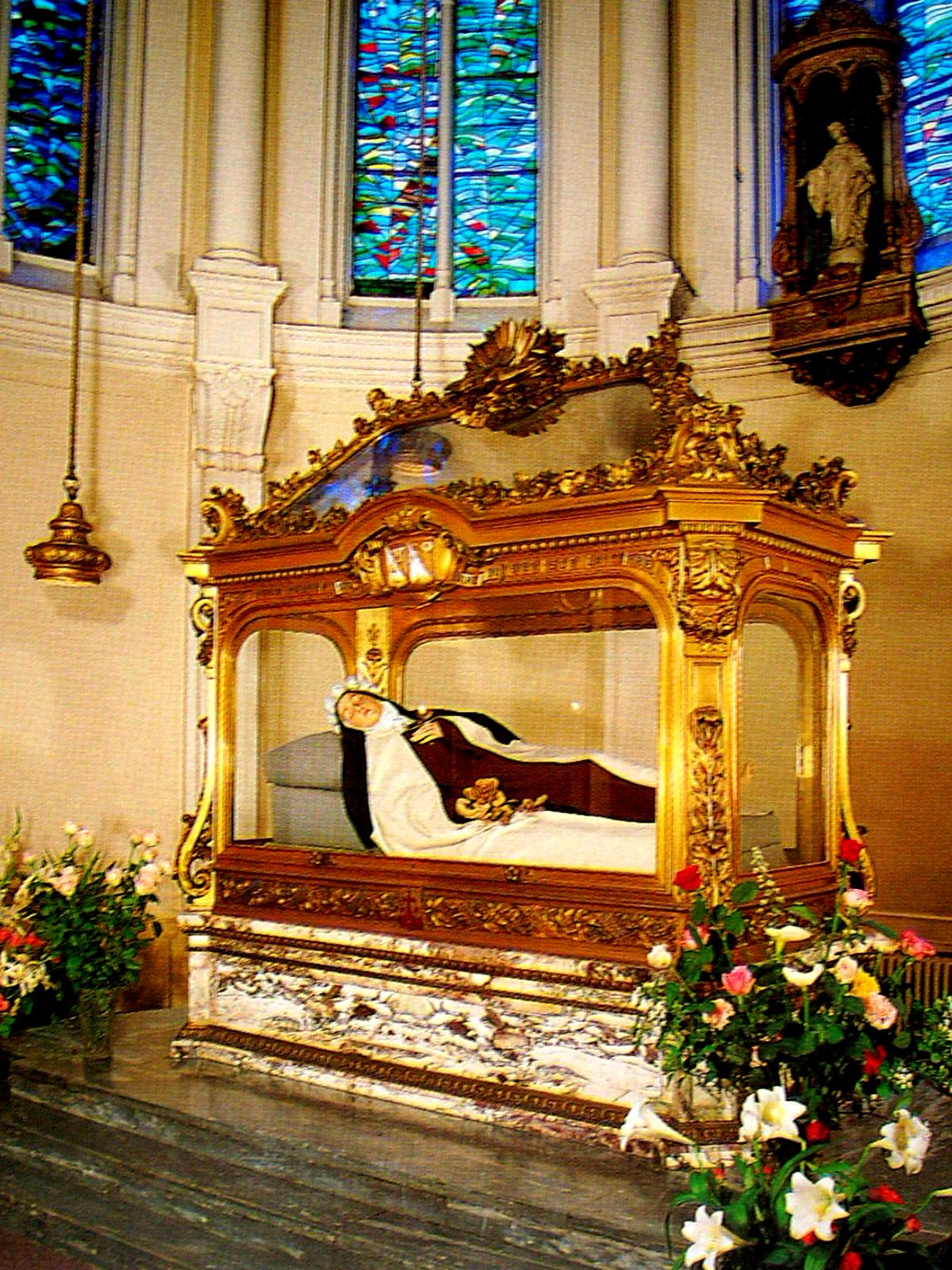
Reliquary in the Carmel in Lisieux

- The Oblates de Ste. Thérèse were founded in 1933 by Gabriel Martin, a priest in the diocese of Luçon (France) and Béatrix Douillard. Their mission is to evangelize in the parishes and to help Saint Thérèse to "spend her heaven by doing good on earth".
- The Congregation of Saint Thérèse of Lisieux was founded on 19 March 1931, by Augustine Kandathil, the Metropolitan of the Syro-Malabar Church, as the first Indian religious congregation for brothers.
- The Little Sisters of Saint Thérèse of the Child Jesus.

=== Works inspired by Therese of Lisieux ===
Simone Bourday as Therese in La Vie miraculeuse de Thérèse Martin (1929)

In films

- 1929: Julien Duvivier, La Vie miraculeuse de Thérèse Martin ("The Miraculous Life of Thérèse Martin"), with Simone Bourday as Thérèse.
- 1939: Maurice de Canonge, Thérèse Martin
- 1952: André Haguet, Procès au Vatican ("Trial at the Vatican"), life of Therese based on original documents in consultation with the abbé Combes
- 1964: Philippe Agostini, Le Vrai Visage de Thérèse of Lisieux ("The True Face of Therese of Lisieux"), short documentary.
- 1986: Alain Cavalier, Thérèse, biographical evocation with Catherine Mouchet as Thérèse, a film rewarded in 1987 with 6 César Awards including the César Award for Best Film.
- 2004: Leonardo Defilippis, Thérèse: The Story of Saint Thérèse of Lisieux.

In music

- An opera, Thérèse, based on her life, was composed by English composer John Tavener in 1969, shortly before his conversion to Eastern Orthodoxy.
- In 1973, Brazilian composer José Antônio de Almeida Prado composed the oratorio Thérèse, l'Amour de Dieu, for speakers, soloists, chorus and orchestra, based on texts by Therese organized by Henri Doublier. The work was commissioned by the French Ministry of Culture and premiered in Rio de Janeiro in 1975.
- The Carmelite friar and musician Pierre Éliane has released four discs on the poetry of Therese. Thérèse songs, three discs from 1992 to 1994, and Sainte Thérèse de Lisieux – poésies (1997). The original texts are sung in full over melodies composed by Pierre Éliane.
- In 2013 Grégoire set some of the poems of Therese to music in an album called Thérèse – Vivre d'amour, with collaborating artists Natasha St-Pier, Anggun, Michael Lonsdale, Grégory Turpin, Les Stentors, Sonia Lacen, Elisa Tovati, Monseigneur di Falco and The Little Singers of Paris.
- The Chairman Dances' song "Thérèse" (2016) "describes the beginning of the end for Saint Therese of Lisieux, who woke to find blood on her handkerchief, a sure sign of ... tuberculosis."
- Missa Sanctae Theresiae ab Infante Iesu by Serban Nichifor, June 2017.

=== Devotees of Therese ===
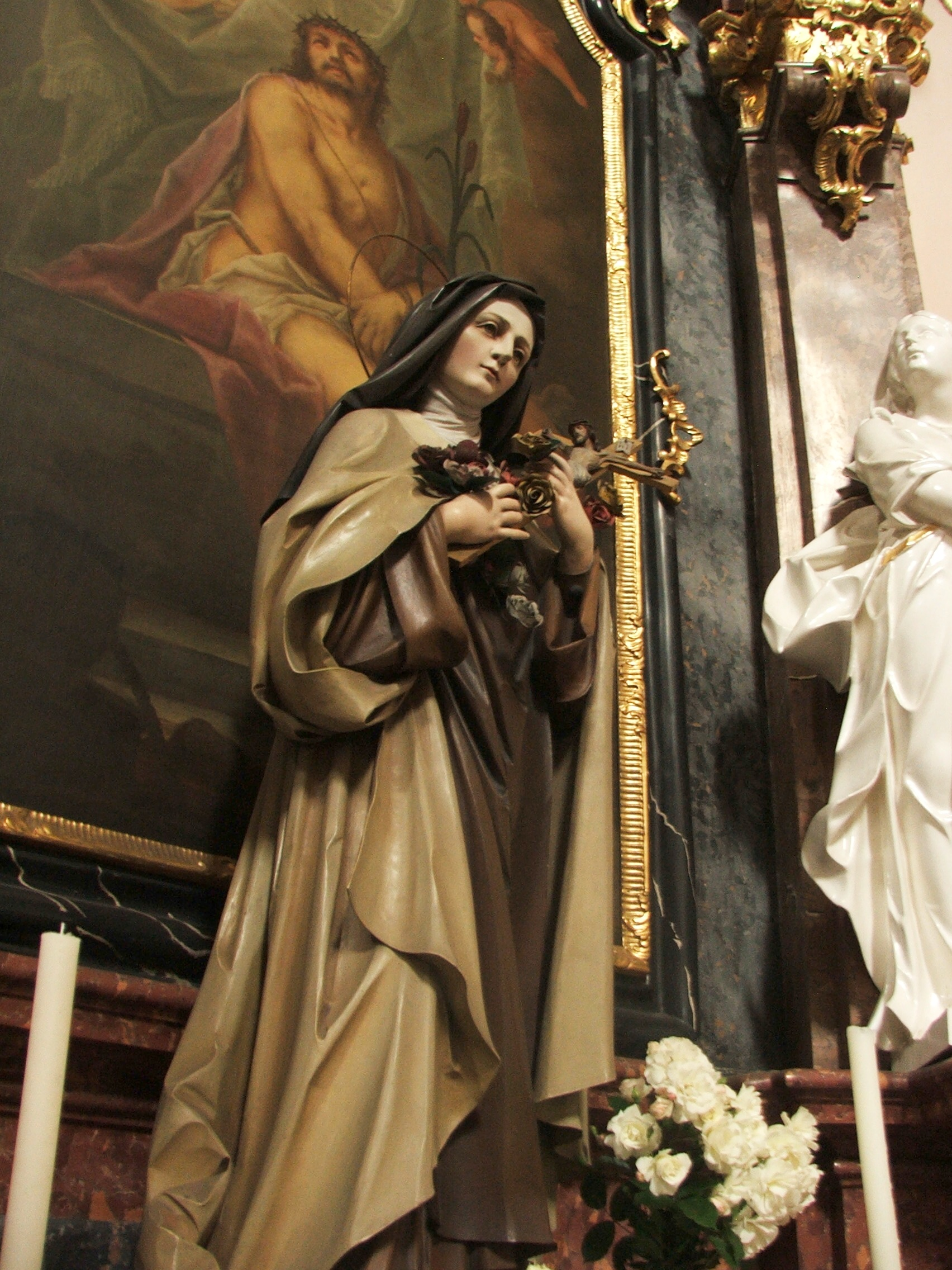
Statue of Saint Thérèse at the Most Holy Trinity Church, Fulnek, Czech Republic

Over the years, a number of prominent people have become devotees of Saint Therese of Lisieux. These include (but are not limited to) the following names listed in alphabetical order (either "name in religion" or "first name + surname").

==== Religious personalities ====
Women

- Alphonsa of the Immaculate Conception or Saint Alphonsa – Poor Clare. She was canonized in 2008 by Pope Benedict XVI.
- Marie of Saint Cecilia of Rome – a Canadian member of the Religious of Jesus and Mary. Feeling very close to Therese of Lisieux, whom she considers a model, she followed her in the "little way". She was beatified in 1993 by Pope John Paul II.
- Maria Candida of the Eucharist – was inspired by reading The Story of a Soul.
- Mother Teresa of Calcutta, explained her choice of the religious name Teresa as follows: "I chose Therese as my namesake because she did ordinary things with extraordinary love". She and Therese were both deeply drawn by the words of Christ on the Cross: "I thirst".

Men

- Cardinal Francis Bourne: "I love St Thérèse of Lisieux very much because she has simplified things: in our relationship with God she has done away with the mathematics".
- Daniel Brottier – the former military chaplain already had great devotion to the little Carmelite. At the time of his appointment in Auteuil Paris, he decided to build a chapel in honor of Therese who had just been beatified a few months earlier, so that the orphans could pray ... in a sanctuary worthy of her."
- Pope Francis – "When I have a problem I ask the saint, not to solve it, but to take it in her hands and help me accept it."
- Albino Luciani, the future Pope John Paul I wrote a letter to Therese that was published in the Catholic newspaper in his diocese. He wrote that he was only seventeen when he read her Story of the soul who appeared to him "like a bolt from the blue".
- Maximilian Kolbe offered his first Mass for the intention of the beatification and canonization of Therese of the Child Jesus and the Holy Face. He also dedicated his Asian missions to Therese.
- Marie-Joseph Lagrange – founder of Biblical School in Jerusalem
- Alfredo Obviar – Filipino bishop and founder of the Missionary Catechists of St. Therese of the Infant Jesus. Pope Francis named him as venerable in 2018.
- Marcel Van, Servant of God, a Vietnamese Redemptorist. He reported visions of Therese. He was influenced by her spirituality. He is called "The apostle of love", continuing the teachings of Therese of Lisieux's "little way".
- Bishop William A. Wack, CSC of Pensacola-Tallahassee placed a rose in his episcopal coat of arms to signify his devotion to St. Therese.

==== Laypersons ====
Women

- Benedetta Bianchi Porro – Italian mystic, whose reliquary in Dovadola includes a quote of Therese, writing: "I am not dying, but I am entering life", and who was read the Act of Oblation to Merciful Love on her own birthday on January 23, 1964. She was beatfied by Pope Francis in 2019.
- Louise Brooks – American dancer and actress: "Her spiritual trek was guided by two New York City priests ... and by a book about the life of Saint Therese of Lisieux, Storm of Glory by John Beevers. So enamored of Saint Therese was Louise that she spent one entire Sunday propped up in bed with her easel, fashioning a portrait in charcoal on canvas from a small photo of Therese at eight. It was the best and most haunting of her dozen works of art."
- Lucie Delarue-Mardrus – French writer: "the Carmelite-apparition ... appeared, roses in hand, in the midst of an era which grieves and terrifies poets ... Therese is my fellow-countrywoman, and almost my contemporary. I do not wish to let her glorious entry into sanctity pass by without honoring her in my own way. And besides, she is henceforth public property." (Introducing her book, 1926).
- Gwen John – Welsh painter "Some of her final paintings were in fact of religious subjects [including] countless (over 700) tiny ink copies after a photograph of Therese of Lisieux and the saint's elder sister".
- Édith Piaf – French singer: "Shortly after her birth Édith developed a cataract. She was blind for almost three years. Her grandmother, Louise, took her to Lisieux. She saw. It was a real miracle for Édith. She always believed this. Since that time she had a real devotion to St Therese of the Child Jesus … she always had a small picture of the saint on her bedside table." (Simone Berteaut, Édith Piaf's closest friend).
- Marthe Robin – French mystic. She said that on October 3, 1926, the first liturgical feast of Therese of Lisieux, she appeared to her three times, telling her that she would not die, that she would live and that she would continue her mission through foundations throughout the world. She was declared venerable by Pope Francis in 2014.
- Vita Sackville-West, author of The Eagle and the Dove a study of Therese of Lisieux and Teresa of Avila – admired the "tough core of heroism" she found in the pages of Histoire d'une âme.
- Anna Schäffer – German mystic. She was canonized by Pope Benedict XVI in 2012.
- Delia Smith – British writer: "Thérèse ... not only personified the first beatitude but is, I am deeply convinced, the supreme teacher in regard to the spiritual life."
- Danica Širola - Croatian school teacher and poet, known as "Croatian Little Flower"

Men

- Henri Bergson – Nobel prize winner: "One reason why the philosopher Henri Bergson esteemed Therese so highly was that he was fascinated by the qualities of character which prompted her to confront the Pope of her day, Leo XIII, in pursuit of her own desires ... explicitly forbidden by the chaplain to address Leo XIII, Therese flouted the injunction ... she was dragged away by two papal guards. This is hardly the simpering and docile saint which Therese's statuary too often suggests."
- Georges Bernanos – "A few months before her death, Therese wrote of 'a wall rising up as far as the heavens … when I sing of the happiness of Heaven, I feel no joy, because I am simply singing of what I WANT TO BELIEVE' (Manuscripts, 248) ... Bernanos, a devotee of Therese, employs the same image in his novel The Diary of a Country Priest, where the priest confides to his diary, "Behind me there was nothing, and in front of me a wall, a black wall".
- Gilbert Cesbron – French novelist. In 1952 he wrote a play called Breaking the statue, telling the story of Therese.
- Jacques Fesch – murderer of a French police officer. He was sentenced to death and executed in 1957. While in prison, he became a devout Roman Catholic.
- Henri Ghéon – French playwright, poet, writer and critic, wrote a book entitled Sainte Thérèse (1934).
- Jean Guitton – French Catholic philosopher and theologian. He expressed his attachment to Therese of Lisieux in several of his works, notably in Portrait de Marthe Robin.
- Jack Kerouac – American novelist, had a boyhood habit of praying to Saint Therese and was an altar boy.
- Charles Maurras – French author, journalist, poet and political philosopher. Initially agnostic, his conversion to Catholicism was the subject of much controversy, but his attachment to Saint Therese seems to have been sincere: "In some ways, Maurras was a very modern 'Catholic': he was sensitive to the "little way" of Therese of Lisieux.
- Alain Mimoun – Algerian-French Olympic marathon champion. He converted from Islam to Roman Catholicism in 1955. A few weeks before the 1956 Summer Olympics, he had doubts about his ability to win. In desperation, following the advice of one of his friends, he went to Lisieux to the Basilica of St. Thérèse. One month later, he won the marathon. From that day on, he was convinced that he owed this victory to the help of Saint Therese. Since then, every year on the feast day of the Saint, he has made the pilgrimage to Lisieux. He said: "St Therese of Lisieux is my patron Saint. The white roses which I planted in front of her [her statue in the garden] flower almost all the year round."
- Giuseppe Moscati – Italian physician and university professor, known for his piety. He was canonised in 1987 by Pope John Paul II.
- Emmanuel Mounier – French writer and philosopher wrote about Therese of Lisieux: "At a time when the petit-bourgeois spirit cannot fail to appear as the dullest antipode of the Christian life, would it not be a ruse of the Holy Spirit, [the coming of Therese], a paradox of Mercy to have hidden under these banal appearances the mysteries of the highest flame of love?".
- Giovanni Papini – Italian journalist, novelist, poet and philosopher, initially anti-clerical, he converted to Catholicism. He wrote about Therese of Lisieux in the posthumously published book Il muro dei gelsomini ("The Wall of the Jasmine"), published in 1957. One of the stories is entitled The Smile of the Saint. He says that as a child he was marked by the smile of a statue of a young girl, in one of the chapels of the church Santa Maria Maddalena dei Pazzi in Florence. A few years later, he discovered that this girl was in fact Therese of Lisieux, who had come on a pilgrimage to the same church in 1887 with her parents.
- Marc Sangnier – founder of Le Sillon, a social Catholic movement
- Fernando del Valle – American operatic tenor
- Maxence Van der Meersch – French Flemish writer of Catholic inspiration. He wrote a religious biography about Therese of Lisieux, entitled La petite Sainte Thérèse (1943).

== Works ==
- St. Thérèse of Lisieux (1922). The Story of a Soul. Translated by Taylor, Thomas N. (1873–1963) London: Burns, Oates & Washbourne, 1912; 8th ed., 1922)

Modern editions and English translations

- Saint Thérèse of Lisieux (1977). St. Thérèse of Lisieux, Her Last Conversations. Translated by John Clarke, OCD. Washington, DC: Institute of Carmelite Studies Publications. ISBN 978-0-9600876-3-1. ISBN 0-9600876-3-X
- Saint Thérèse of Lisieux (1996). Story of a Soul: the Autobiography of St. Therese of Lisieux. Translated by John Clarke, OCD (3rd ed.). Washington, DC: Institute of Carmelite Studies Publications. ISBN 978-0-9352165-8-5.
- Saint Thérèse of Lisieux (2006). The Story of a Soul (L'histoire d'une âme): the autobiography of St. Thérèse of Lisieux. Translated by Taylor, Thomas N. Teddington, Middlesex: Echo Library. ISBN 978-1-4068-0771-4. ISBN 1-4068-0771-0

== See also ==
- National Shrine of the Little Flower – Roman Catholic church and shrine
- Saint Thérèse of Lisieux, patron saint archive
