= Basilica of Notre-Dame d'Alençon =

Church in Alencon, France

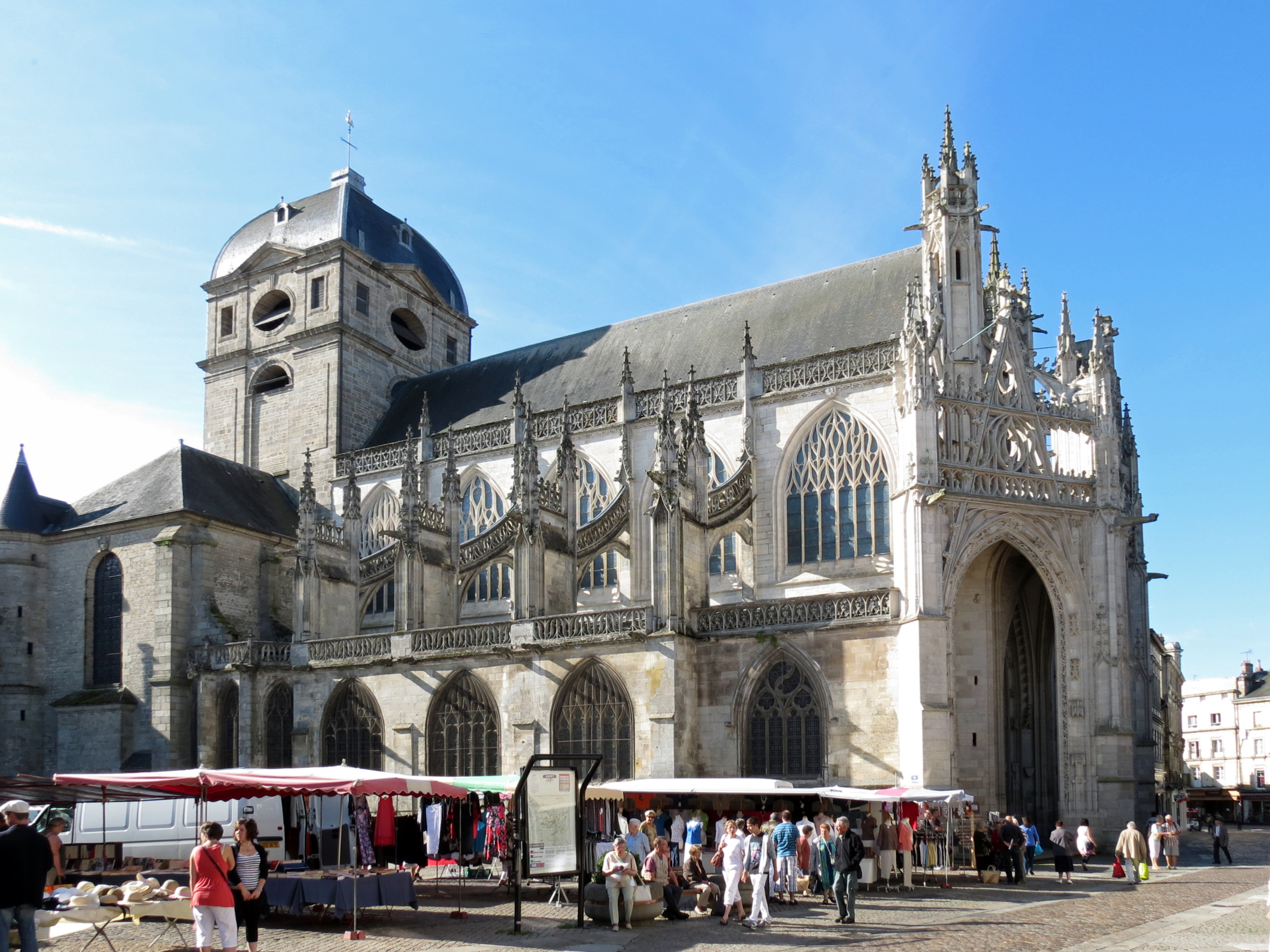
- A northern view of the basilica, showing its 18th-century steeple, flying buttresses, and the Gothic porch

Religion
- Affiliation: Catholic Church
- Province: Diocese of Séez
- Region: Orne
- Rite: Roman Rite

Location
- Location: 48°25′47″N 0°5′19″E
- State: France
- Interactive map of Basilica of Notre-Dame d'Alençon

Architecture
- Type: Basilica parish
- Style: French Gothic
- Groundbreaking: 1300s
- Completed: c. 1500
- Monument historique
- Official name: Église Notre-Dame
- Designated: 1862
- Reference no.: PA00110692
- Denomination: Église

Website
- www.orne.catholique.fr/pelerinage-sanctuaires/basilique-notre-dame-d-alencon

The Basilica of Notre-Dame d'Alençon (French: Basilique Notre-Dame d'Alençon) is a Gothic parish church located in Alençon, Orne, France. It was elevated to the rank of minor basilica by Pope Benedict XVI in 2009.

== History ==
A Romanesque church dedicated to the Assumption of the Blessed Virgin already existed on the current site of the basilica in the 12th century. This earlier structure may have featured a wooden-roofed nave. It was a priory church founded by and dependent upon the Abbey of Lonlay (for which the commune in which it is located, Lonlay-l'Abbaye, is named). Later it became parish church, and was enlarged for the purpose. Construction on the nave of the current structure began as early as before the Hundred Years' War (1337–1453). Aisles were added onto the nave in about 1470, and substantial work on the fabric of the church continued until the early 16th century.

In about the year 1500, during the time of the Blessed Margaret of Lorraine, a new master builder, Jehan Lemoine, made substantial changes to the architectural project of the church. He built the elaborate Porch of the Transfiguration on its west side, and decorated the nave with its current star-patterned vaults and richly decorated ribs, supported on the outside by two ranks of flying buttresses. At that time, side chapels were placed between the abutments of the buttresses.

The end result was a Gothic structure characteristic of late-Medieval Norman architecture, but it underwent later transformations. The decoration of the portal, for example, was defaced during the Wars of Religion (1562–1598). Also, in August 1744, lightning struck the wooden bell tower and the resulting fire destroyed the choir and transepts. The engineer Jean-Rodolphe Perronet rebuilt those parts of the church between 1745 and 1762, constructing the squat steeple at the crossing. Further damage was done during the French Revolution, when the church was looted and devastated, such that by the middle of the 19th century, it threatened to fall into ruin. Subsequent restoration campaigns, however, succeeded in saving the church.

=== Connection to the Martin family ===
Saints Louis and Zélie Martin, the parents of Saint Thérèse of Lisieux, were married in the church on 13 July 1858, and it was there that Thérèse received the sacrament of baptism on 4 January 1873. The baptismal gown used for the ceremony is displayed in the basilica as a relic for the veneration of the faithful, and a stained glass window in the baptistry commemorates the ceremony. Finally, Zélie's funeral was held there after her death in 1877.

By virtue of its connection with the Martin family and in recognition of its status as a place of pilgrimage, the church was designated a minor basilica by Pope Benedict XVI on 10 August 2009.

== Architecture ==
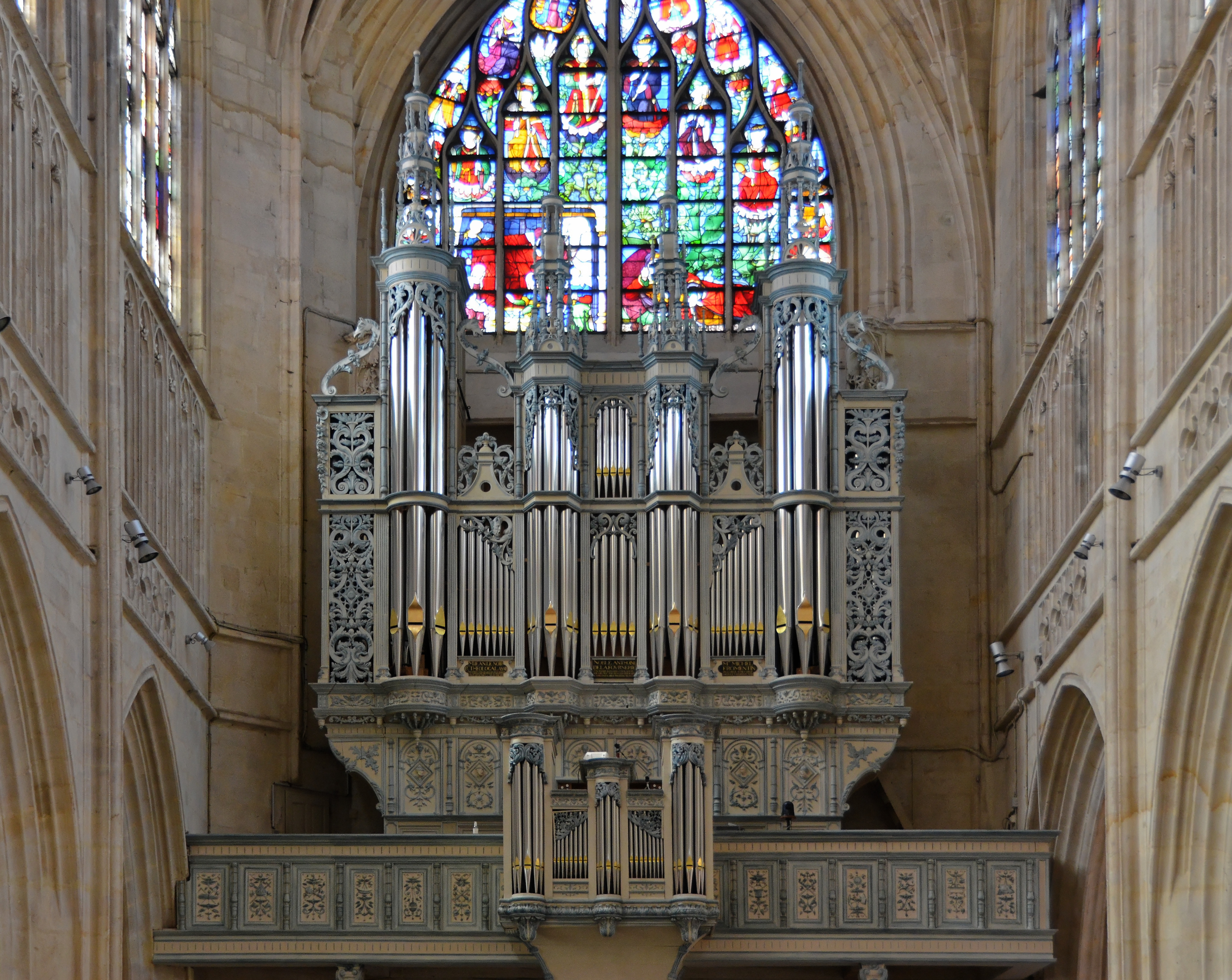
Pipe organ of the Basilica of Notre-Dame d'Alençon

The architectural sources for the construction of Notre-Dame d'Alençon are to be found in churches such as La Trinité de Falaise, Saint-Germain d'Argentan, and Saint-Maclou in Rouen.

The church is constructed in the shape of a Latin cross, in three sections. The central nave of five bays is supported by strong fasciculated columns with reduced capitals, indicative of early 15th-century construction, and rising in three storeys. The aisles are covered by rib vaults, while the main nave is decorated with star-patterned tierceron vaults with ridge rib and tufty foliage sprigs. The supporting pillars of the nave are cylindrical, with attached sharp-edged fillet moldings. In the arcade, single fillets are topped by a foliate capitals that also cap the cylindrical core of the piers. The arcade and bay divisions shows both disappearing and continuous moldings, both of which are elements of Late Gothic articulation. The middle level of the nave's elevation is a blind triforium with a lower balustrade; the broad clerestory windows are decorated with flamboyant tracery.

Off the nave are side aisles, which were added on in the 15th century, and side chapels added in the sixteenth. The sanctuary, with its transepts and choir, are the result of an 18th-century rebuilding. The three-sided western porch is especially notable, dating from the start of the 16th century and executed in flamboyant Gothic style.

The program of stained glass, dating from the Renaissance era, depicts Old Testament scenes on the north side of the basilica, and on the south side, scenes from the life of the Blessed Virgin. Although the glass has undergone many restorations, it was not affected by the violence of the Second World War. During the 19th-century restoration of the church, stained glass windows for the chapels were created to match the historic windows of the nave. Those windows, installed in 1884, were damaged by bombing in 1944, and afterwards replaced between 1986 and 1996 by stained glass created by Flandrin and Courageux.

The high altar is housed beneath a baldachin with gloria installed during the 18th-century replacement of the choir, the same era that furnished the baptismal font in the northern chapel. Above the altar, a monumental sculpture represents the Assumption of Mary and replaces a pietà that was destroyed during the Revolution.

A new pipe organ by Jean Daldosso was fitted in 2016 in the 1537 organ case.
