= François-Marie Picaud =

French bishop (1878–1960)

- Bishop
- Previous post: Auxiliary Bishop of Vannes (1925–1931)

Orders
- Ordination: 20 December 1900
- Consecration: 1 July 1925

Personal details
- Born: 31 January 1878 Josselin, Morbihan, France
- Died: 29 March 1960 (aged 82) Malestroit, France
- Motto: In virtute Dei
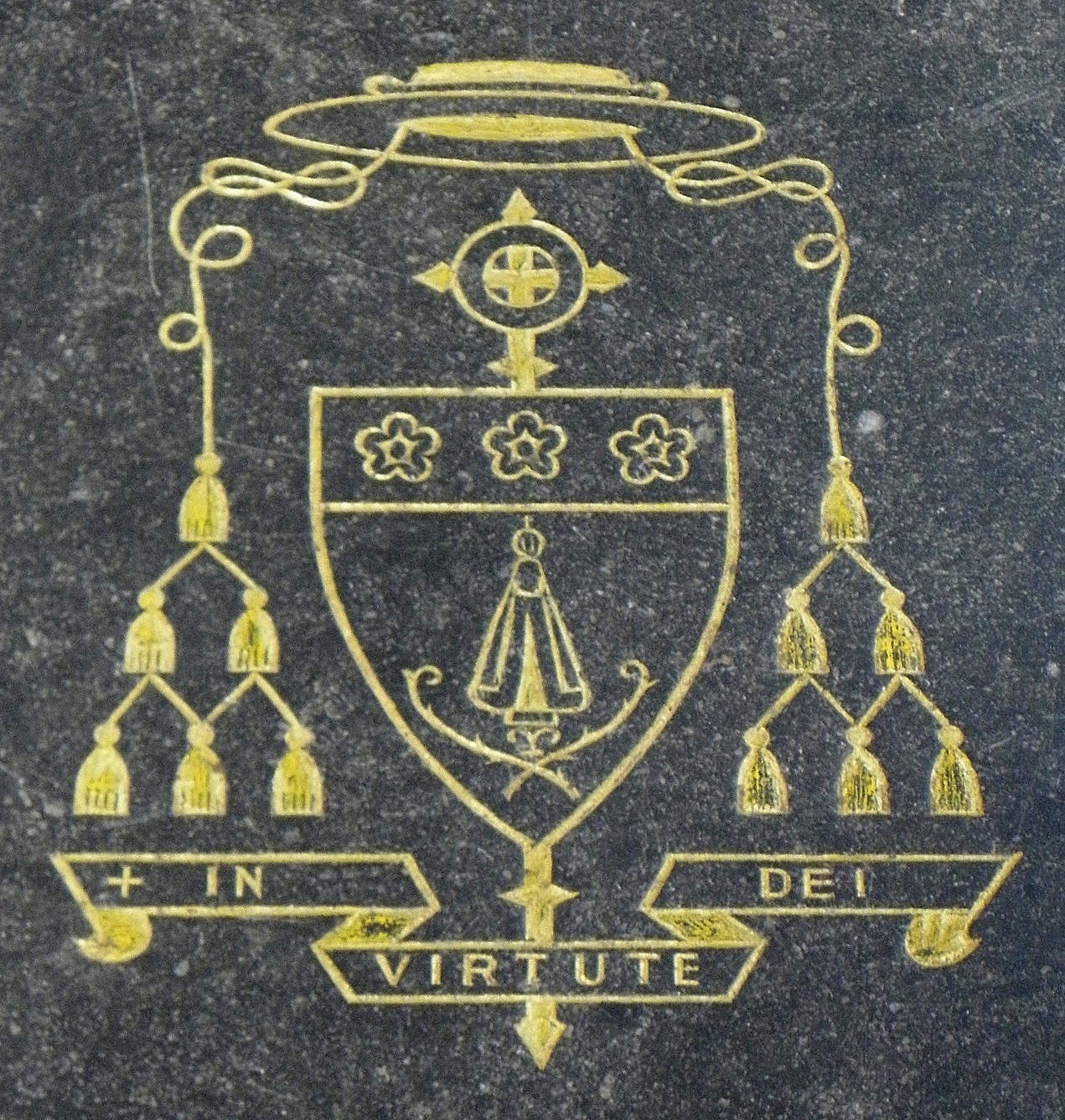
- Coat of arms

François-Marie Picaud (31 January 1878 – 29 March 1960) was a French Catholic prelate. He served as the auxiliary bishop of Vannes from 1925 and later as the bishop of Bayeux and Lisieux from 1931 to 1954.

Picaud was ordained as a priest on 20 December 1900. On 15 May 1925, he was appointed auxiliary bishop of Vannes and titular bishop of Erythrae in Asia Minor. He was consecrated as a bishop on 1 July 1925. On 12 September 1931, he was named bishop of Bayeux and Lisieux.

During his tenure, Picaud oversaw the diocese through the tumultuous years of World War II, during which the region suffered significant destruction, particularly organizing those made homeless during the fighting.

In 1951, he officiated the funeral of Mother Agnès of Jesus, the prioress of the Carmel of Lisieux and sister of Saint Thérèse of Lisieux.

On 5 August 1954, Picaud retired and was named Bishop Emeritus of Bayeux and Lisieux, as well as titular bishop of Alba Maritima in Dalmatia. He died on 29 March 1960. His episcopal motto was "In virtute Dei" ("In the power of God").
