= Basilica of the National Shrine of the Little Flower =

- Our Lady of Mount Carmel and St. Therese Church
- U.S. National Register of Historic Places
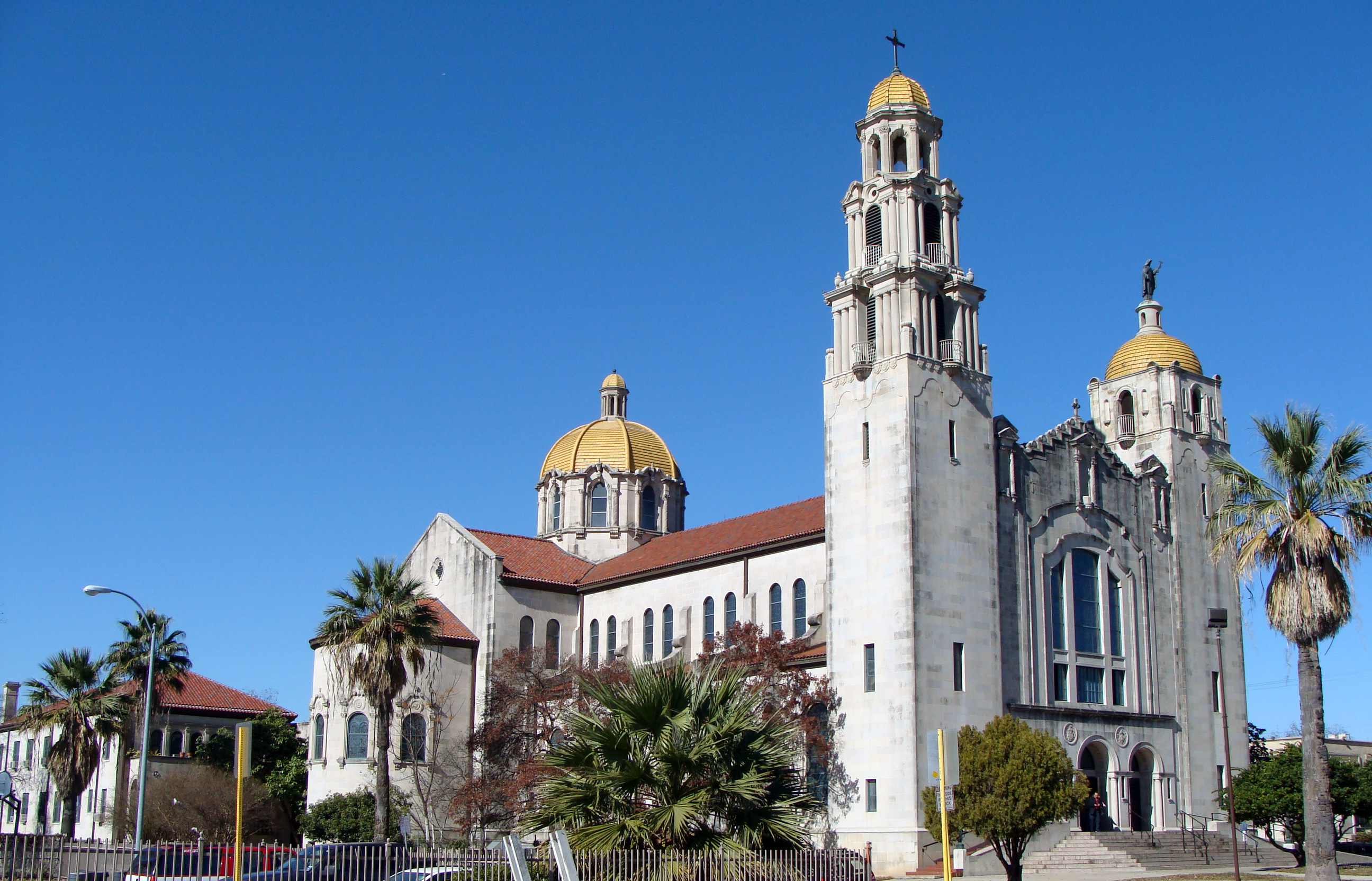

- Location within Texas
- Location: 1715 N. Zarzamora St., San Antonio, Texas
- Coordinates: 29°26′45″N 98°31′30″W
- Area: 2.4 acres (0.97 ha)
- Built: 1926-1931
- Architects: Monnot, Charles L. Jr.; Dennehy Construction Co.
- Architectural style: Beaux Arts
- Website: littleflowerbasilica.org
- NRHP reference No.: 98000843
- Added to NRHP: July 09, 1998

The Basilica of the National Shrine of the Little Flower, also called Our Lady of Mount Carmel and St. Thérèse Church, is a historic Catholic church in San Antonio, Texas. It is one of 84 minor basilicas in the United States and one of only four in the state of Texas.

== History ==
The basilica is dedicated to St. Thérèse de Lisieux of the Child Jesus, and bearing her nickname, "The Little Flower" of Jesus. The cornerstone of her basilica was blessed and laid on October 15, 1929. Its edifice and accompanying works of religious art are uncharacteristic of its relatively recent construction.

The basilica is a treasury of art, master craftsmanship, and relics. The Discalced Carmelite Friars began serving the surrounding parish community in San Antonio in 1926. The basilica was thus constructed during the Great Depression (1929–1931) and today stands as a monument to the great faith of devotees of St. Thérèse from throughout the United States and the world.

Perhaps the most treasured work of art at the basilica is a painting of St. Thérèse, a gift from the Carmel of Lisieux to the friars of San Antonio in 1927. The saint's blood sister Céline Martin (1869–1959), also a nun (Sr. Genevieve of the Holy Face) in the Carmel of Lisieux, created the model for this painting, referred to as the "Apotheosis," at the request of the Vatican during the canonization process for Thérèse, according to the Archives of Carmel in Lisieux. Another artist, Pascal Blanchard, painted several large canvases based on Celine's model. Céline and another nun, Sr. Marie of the Holy Spirit, then retouched the face on each copy. One of these paintings was the standard carried in the procession to St. Peter's during the canonization ceremony on May 17, 1925; it was returned to the nuns after the ceremony. The basilica's painting is one of the several others that were loaned out by the Convent of Lisieux to Carmels in France for the canonization events.

The painting was acquired for the friars of San Antonio by Fr. Raymon Gomez, one of the four original friars who arrived in San Antonio in 1926. He was instrumental in bringing to fruition the friars’ dream of building a national shrine to be dedicated to the newly canonized St. Thérèse.

It's recorded in Basilica archives that he went to France in 1927 to visit the sisters of St. Thérèse's Discalced Carmelite Convent in Lisieux to ask for their blessing on the project. The nuns, including St. Thérèse's sister Pauline, who was then prioress of Lisieux, were delighted with the idea and pledged their support. Along with their blessings, the nuns sent gifts, including autographed books and photos, medals, printed collection cards, relics of all degrees, and this beautiful portrait to grace the Shrine upon its opening.

The original painting was restored with the support of the Strake Foundation of Houston and reinstalled in a place of honor in the basilica in 2007. It is 7 ft (2.1 m) wide by 10 ft (3.0 m) tall, and is located in the undercroft of the church.

== Significance ==
Now that the National Shrine of the Little Flower has joined the ranks of a minor basilica, the church's ecclesiastical throne has become, symbolically, a papal throne. The throne is original to the basilica and has been used by various visiting prelates for over 70 years. Most recently it has been used by the archbishop and auxiliary bishops of the Archdiocese of San Antonio during special liturgies, such as feast day Masses and ordinations at the basilica.

=== Relics ===
The basilica of the Little Flower safeguards the relics of both St. Thérèse and her parents, Sts. Louis Martin and Marie-Azélie Guérin.

==== St. Thérèse ====
The basilica is home to three first class relics of the Little Flower. Two are contained within the tomb chapel of St. Thérèse.

The relics of Thérèse are regularly exposed on a weekly basis for public veneration.

==== The parents of St. Thérèse ====
First class relics of Sts. Louis and Zélie Martin, the parents of St. Thérèse of Lisieux, were exposed October 18, 2015 at the Basilica of the National Shrine of the Little Flower for public veneration for the first time on the day of the couple's canonization in Rome by the Catholic Church. The relics were a gift to the Discalced Carmelite Friars of San Antonio from the Discalced Carmelite nuns of Lafayette, LA.

The back of the reliquary depicts the biblical couple Sara and Tobias, recalling the essential role of marriage as a vocation in human history and in the history of salvation. The theme of Sara and Tobias is taken from the medal that Louis Martin chose as a souvenir of his wedding with Zelie Guerin on July 13, 1858, in Notre Dame d’Alençon. The original medal was blessed during the exchange of the rings and is at the Diocese of Séez, France. The reliquary contains particles of the Martins’ hair.

== Gallery ==
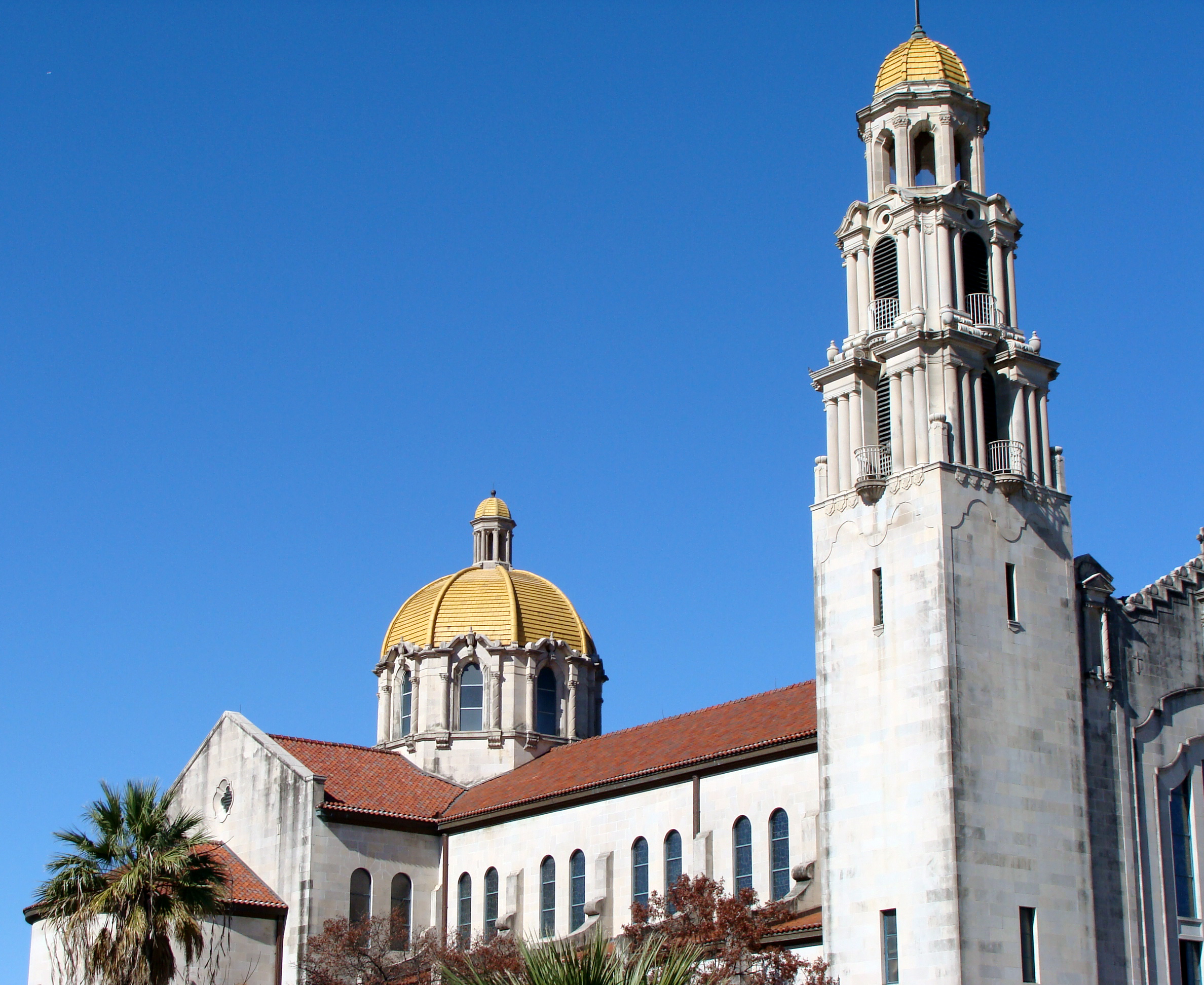

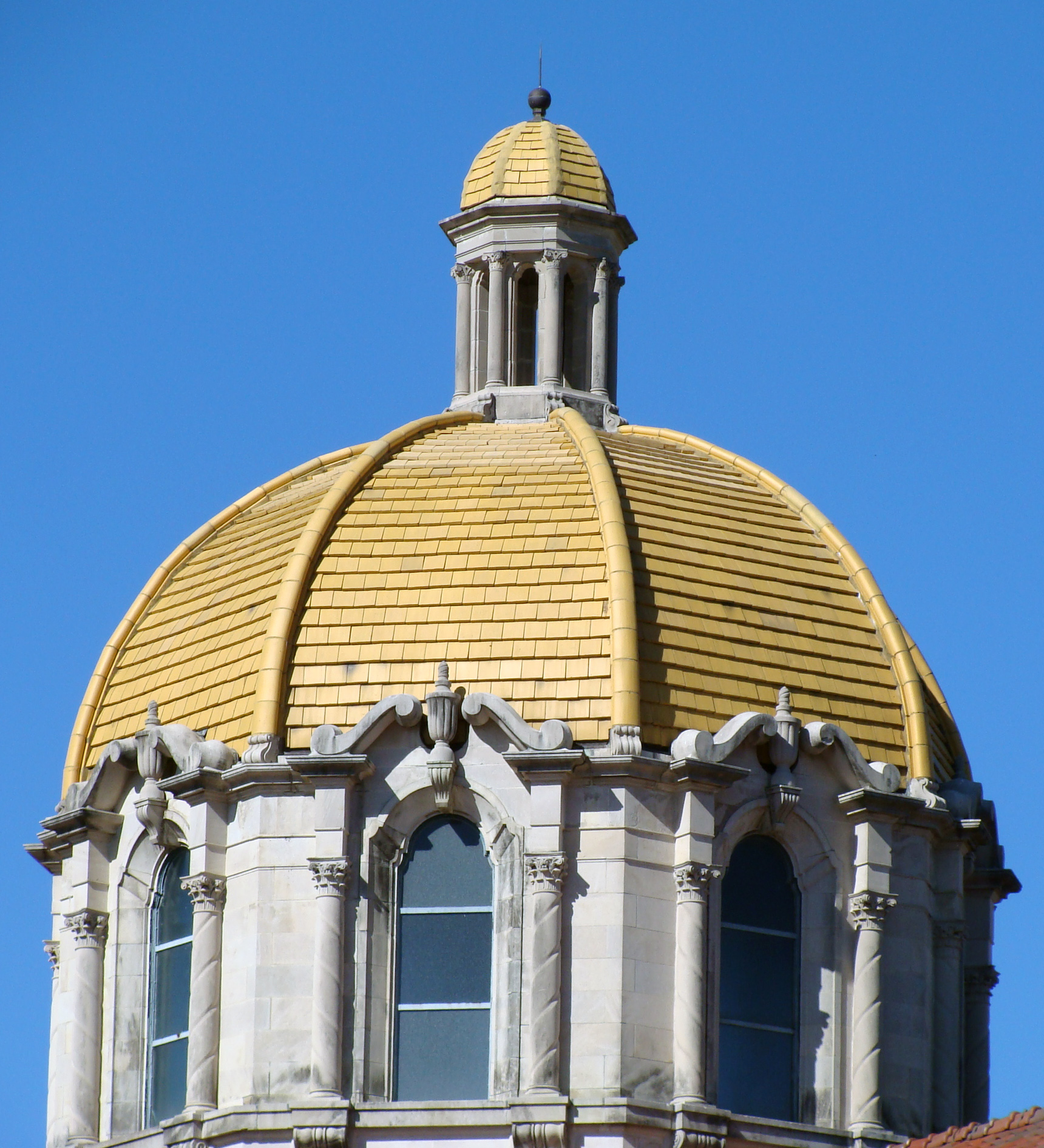

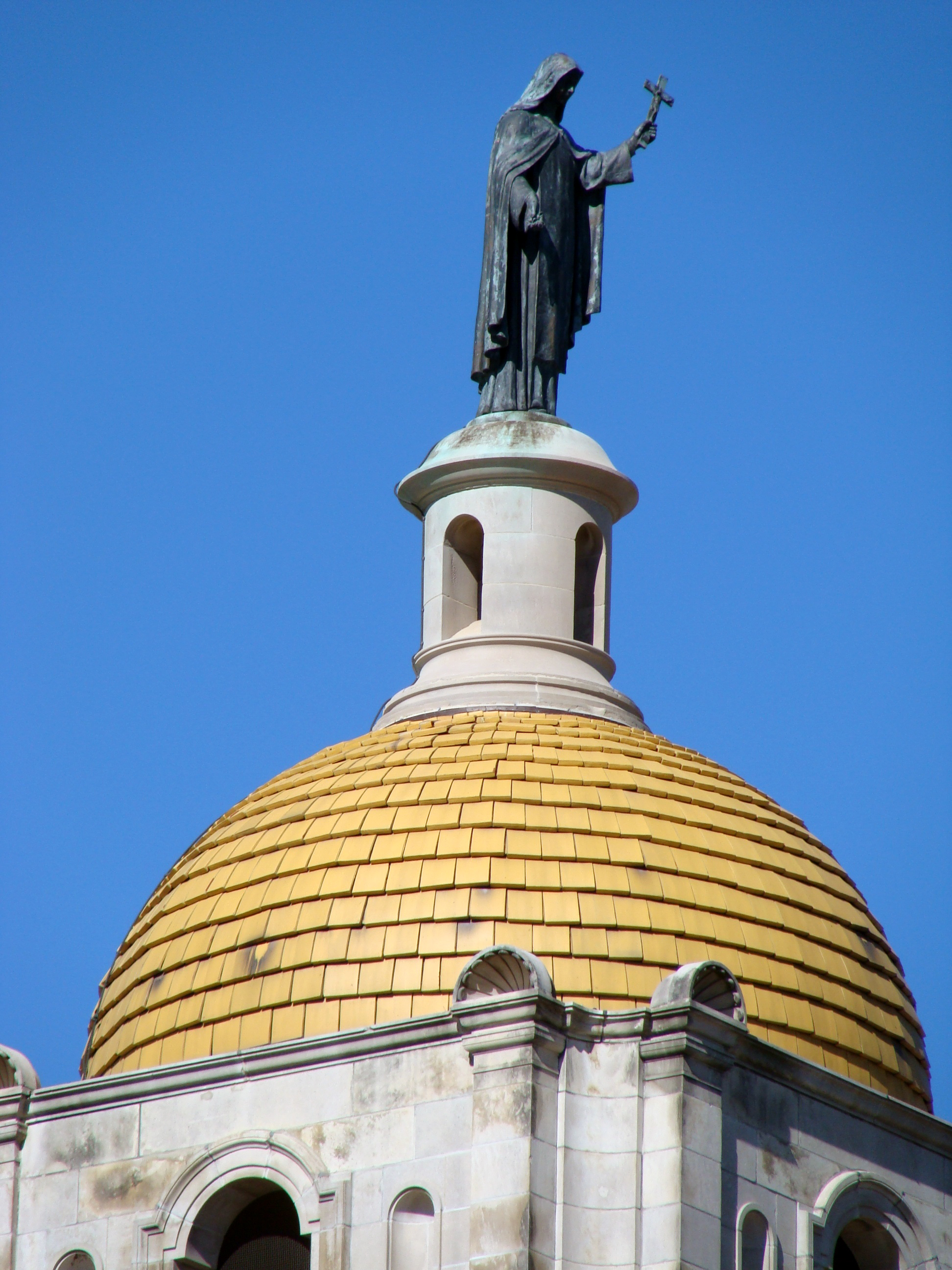

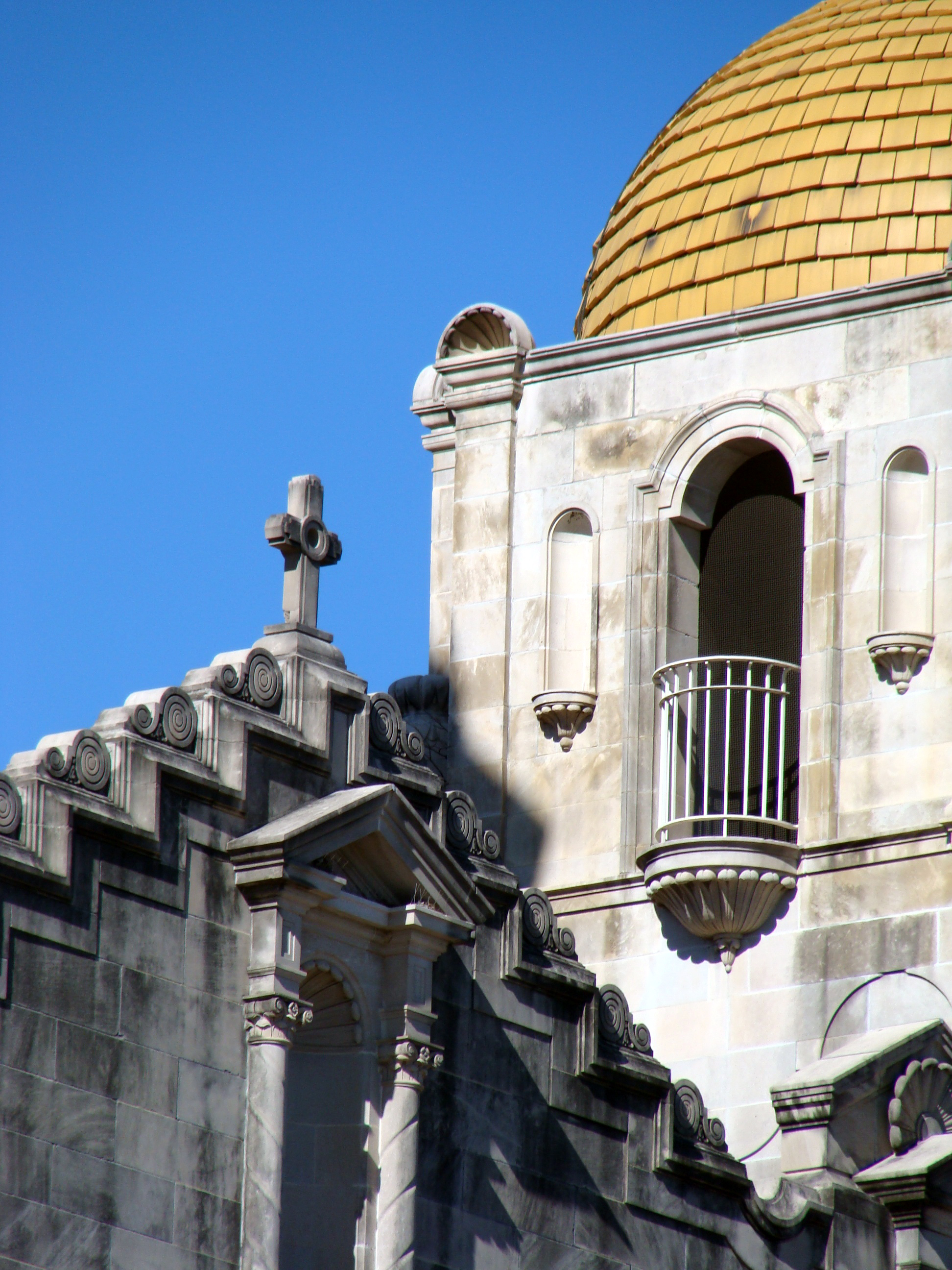

== See also ==
- List of basilicas
