= Beuerberg Abbey =

Roman Catholic monastery in Bavaria, Germany

Coordinates: 47°49′44″N 11°24′40″E

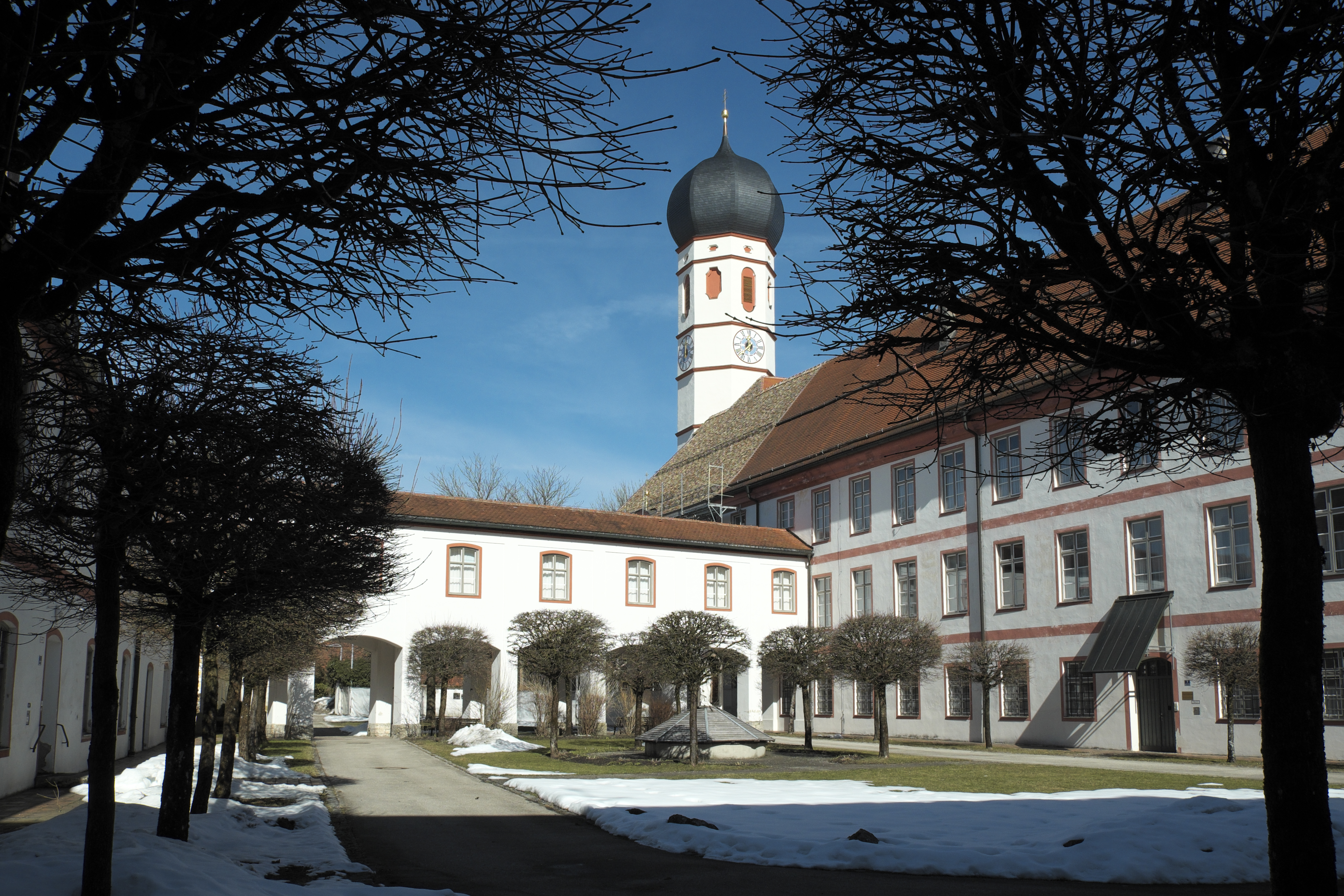
Kloster Beuerberg

Aerial view

Beuerberg Abbey (German: Kloster Beuerberg), formerly a monastery of the Augustinian Canons, is now the Monastery of the Visitation, Beuerberg (German: Kloster der Heimsuchung, Beuerberg), a community of the Visitandines in Eurasburg in Bavaria, Germany.

== Canons ==
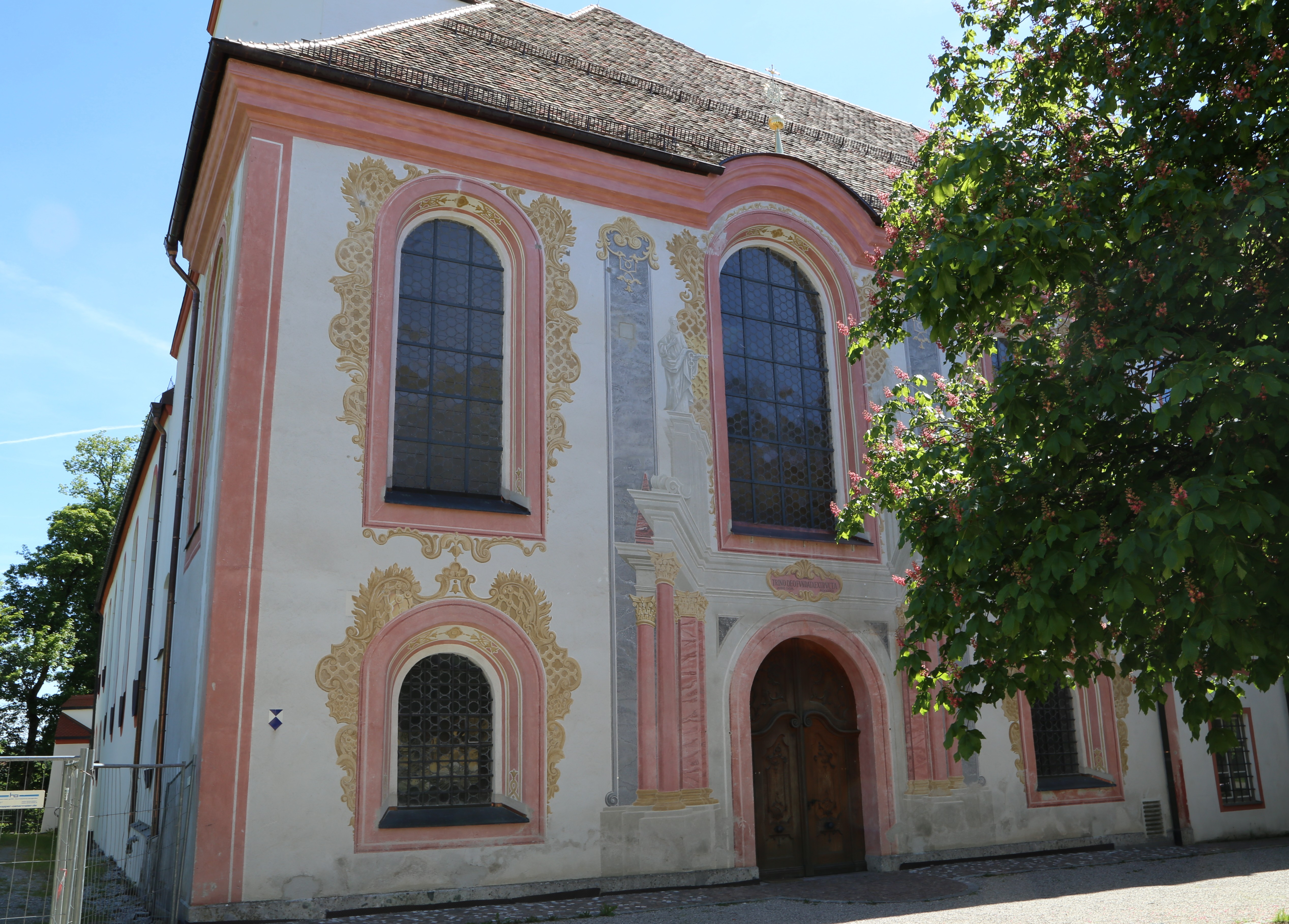
Church of Saints Peter and Paul, Beuerberg

The monastery, dedicated to Saints Peter and Paul, was founded in about 1120 by Count Otto of Eurasburg; the church was dedicated in 1127. It was damaged by fire in 1294 and again in 1330, when the library and archives were largely destroyed. It was a small house for most of the Middle Ages, but gained in numbers during the reforms originating from the monastery at Indersdorf of the mid-15th century. It suffered a collapse during the late 15th century and the first half of the 16th century.

The abbey was sacked during the Thirty Years' War, but was rebuilt as early as the 1630s in the Baroque style by either Isaak Paader or Hans Krumpper based on the design of St. Michael's Church in Munich. The upper parts of the tower were built after 1659. It became a part of the Lateran Congregation in 1710, when the prior was elevated to the rank of abbot. The monastery building was rebuilt, starting in 1729. Thereafter it was a centre for scholarship and historical study. It was dissolved in 1803 in the course of the secularisation of Bavaria.

The last abbot, Paul Hupfauer, chief librarian of the Electors of Bavaria, was appointed Library Commissioner in 1802 and during secularisation secured the transfer of many hundreds of books and manuscripts to the Bayerische Staatsbibliothek (Bavarian State Library) and to the university library of the Ludwig-Maximilians-Universität München. The abbey church became the parish church.

== Visitandines ==
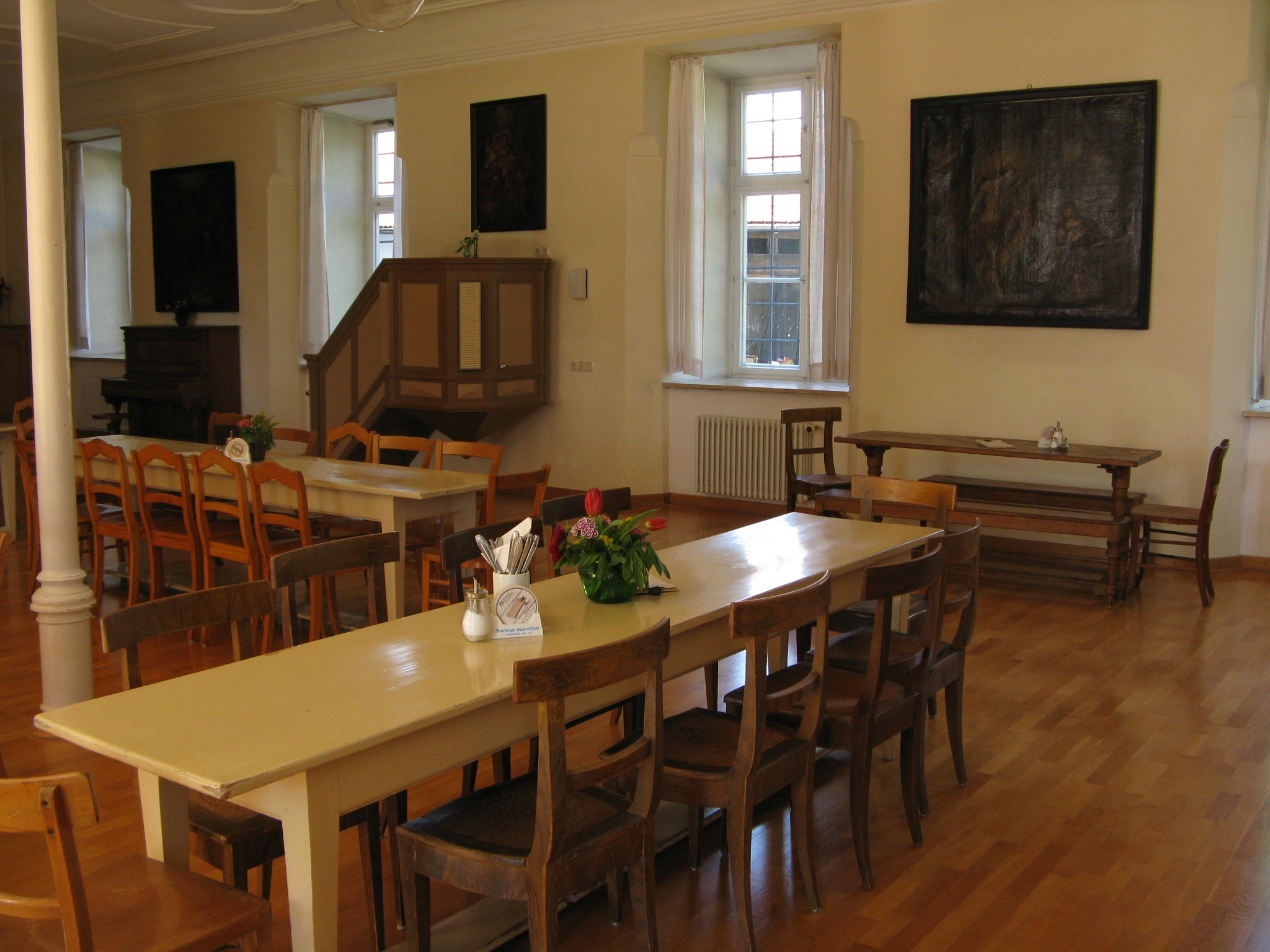
Refectory, Kloster Beuerberg

In 1835 the Visitandines, known also as the Salesian Sisters, from the Visitandine house at Dietramszell, acquired and re-settled the premises. Between 1846 and 1938 they ran a girls' school and a home for nursing mothers, and afterwards an old people's convalescent home.

In December 2013 the prioress died, and with the care for the building complex proving too demanding for the thirteen remaining elderly nuns, they decided to move into a shared elderly home run by Franciscan and Salesian nuns nearby. In 2015, the Visitandine order and the Archdiocese of Munich and Freising worked out an arrangement to house refugees in the vacant abbey in the hope that families from Syria, Iraq, Nigeria, Afghanistan and other conflict zones might find shelter here. Cardinal Reinhard Marx, Archbishop of Munich and Freising, has been an outspoken advocate on behalf of migrants, refugees, and asylum seekers. The abbey can house 60 refugees.

The Archdiocese's approach is important for two reasons. It not only supplies critically needed housing for refugees, but according to Msgr. Peter Beer, archdiocesan vicar general, it serves "as a test case and model for the future use of the more than 100 monasteries across Upper Bavaria". With support from the Knights of Malta, the archdiocese plans to provide a variety of services: psychological counseling, German-language lessons and assistance with state services.

In September 2015, Archabbot Asztrik Várszegi of the Benedictine Pannonhalma Archabbey in Hungary opened its doors to refugees saying, "We cannot leave anyone outside because doing so would contradict the Gospel".
