= Eurasburg =

- Municipality
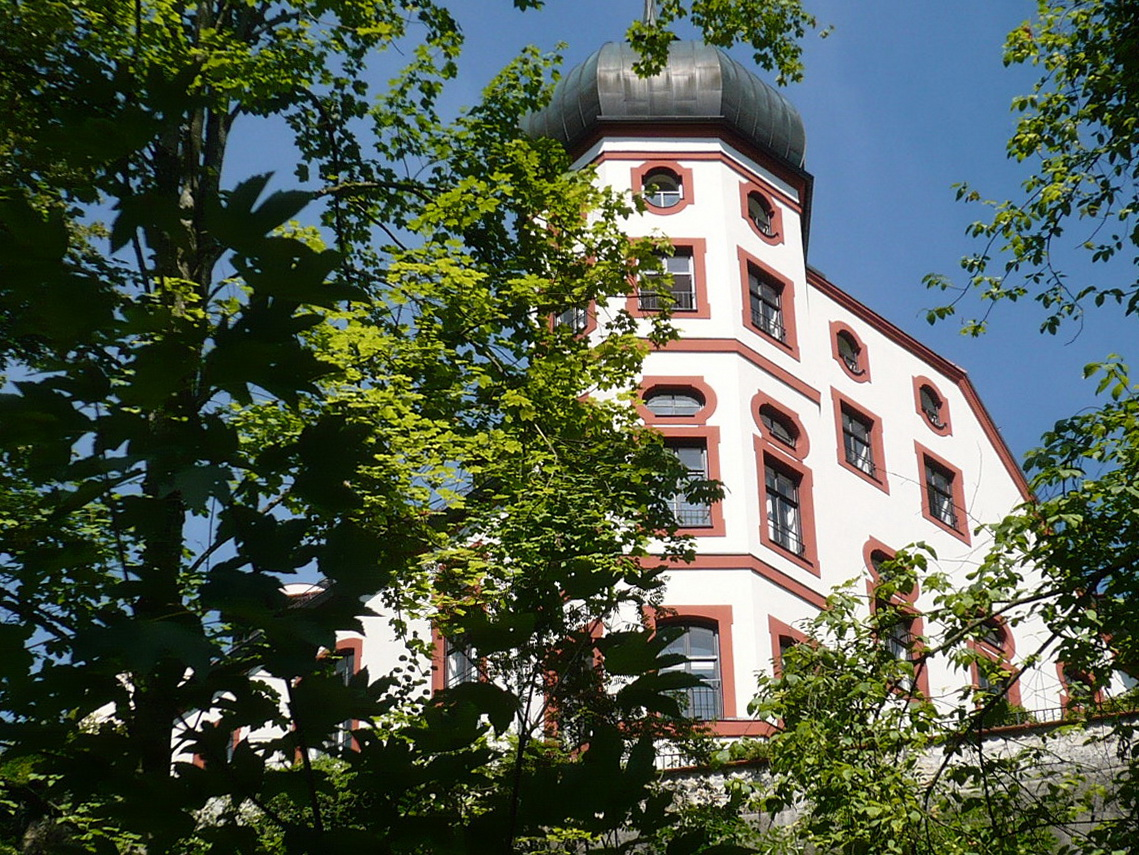
- Eurasburg Castle

- Coat of arms

- Location of Eurasburg within Bad Tölz-Wolfratshausen district
- Interactive map of Eurasburg
- Location within Germany Location within Bavaria
- Coordinates: 47°51′N 11°24′E
- Country: Germany
- State: Bavaria
- Admin. region: Oberbayern
- District: Bad Tölz-Wolfratshausen
- Subdivisions: 52 villages and hamlets

Government
  - Mayor (2020–26): Moritz Sappl

Area
  - Total: 40.9 km^{2} (15.8 sq mi)
- Elevation: 600 m (2,000 ft)

Population (2025-12-31)
  - Total: 4,302
  - Density: 105/km^{2} (272/sq mi)
- Time zone: UTC+01:00 (CET)
  - Summer (DST): UTC+02:00 (CEST)
- Postal codes: 82547
- Dialling codes: 08179, (08171 in Achmühle)
- Vehicle registration: TÖL and WOR
- Website: www.eurasburg.de

Eurasburg (Central Bavarian: Eiraschburg) is a municipality in Oberbayern (Upper Bavaria). It is situated about 40 kilometres (25 miles) south of the Bavarian state capital, Munich, in the county of Bad Tölz-Wolfratshausen.

Since the redistricting reforms of 1978, the municipality of Eurasburg has had an area of 40.9 square kilometres (15.8 sq mi), which includes 52 communities. The two largest communities are Eurasburg and Beuerberg. The municipality has a population of about 4,400.

== History ==
The Irings established their fiefdom in the Loisach valley. It covered an area from Herrenhausen to Lake Starnberg and from Wolfratshausen to the fief belonging to Benediktbeuern Abbey. The castle built by the Irings, Iringsburg, gave the community its name.

Albert von Iringsburg, as a follower of Emperor Henry IV, was anathematized by Pope Gregory VII. To atone for her father and husband, Berta von Iringsburg and her sons Otto and Eberhard founded an Augustine monastery in 1121, which is now in the hands of the Salesians of Don Bosco. The abbey administered all church possessions in the whole fiefdom.

Albert VI of Bavaria tore down the old Iringsburg in 1626. The manor house which stands today was built in the late Renaissance style according to the design of Peter Candid. The manor house burned down in 1976. It was rebuilt in the 1980s and subsequently subdivided into private apartments.

In the concluding stages of World War II in Europe, a death march of former prisoners from the Dachau concentration camp headed southwards to, and then turned eastwards from Eurasburg, headed towards Waakirchen where the U.S. Army's 522nd Field Artillery Battalion of segregated Nisei troops rescued them on May 2, 1945.

== Cultural and historical sites ==
Eurasburg is also home to Beuerberg Abbey, founded in about 1121 and renovated in the 18th century, and containing architecture from the 12th to the 18th centuries. It was dissolved in the secularisation of 1803. Today, the premises are occupied by the Visitandines.

== Twin towns ==
Eurasburg is twinned with:

- Rybnik in Poland (since 05.07.2001)
