= Order of the Visitation of Holy Mary =

Enclosed religious order, founded 1610

- Ordo Visitationis Beatissimae Mariae Virginis
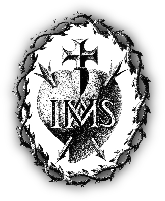
- Abbreviation: VSM
- Nickname: Visitandines
- Formation: June 6, 1610; 416 years ago
- Founder: Bishop Francis de Sales; Jane Frances de Chantal
- Type: Religious Order of Pontifical Right for women
- Members: 1,529 members as of 2020
- Parent organization: Catholic Church
- Website: www.vistyr.org
- Remarks: Motto: Latin: Vivet Jésu ('Live Jesus')

The Order of the Visitation of Holy Mary (Latin: Ordo Visitationis Beatissimae Mariae Virginis), abbreviated VSM and also known as the Visitandines, is a Catholic religious order of pontifical right for women. Founded by Bishop Francis de Sales and Jane Frances de Chantal in 1610, they are also known as the Salesian Sisters or more commonly as the Visitation Sisters.

== History ==
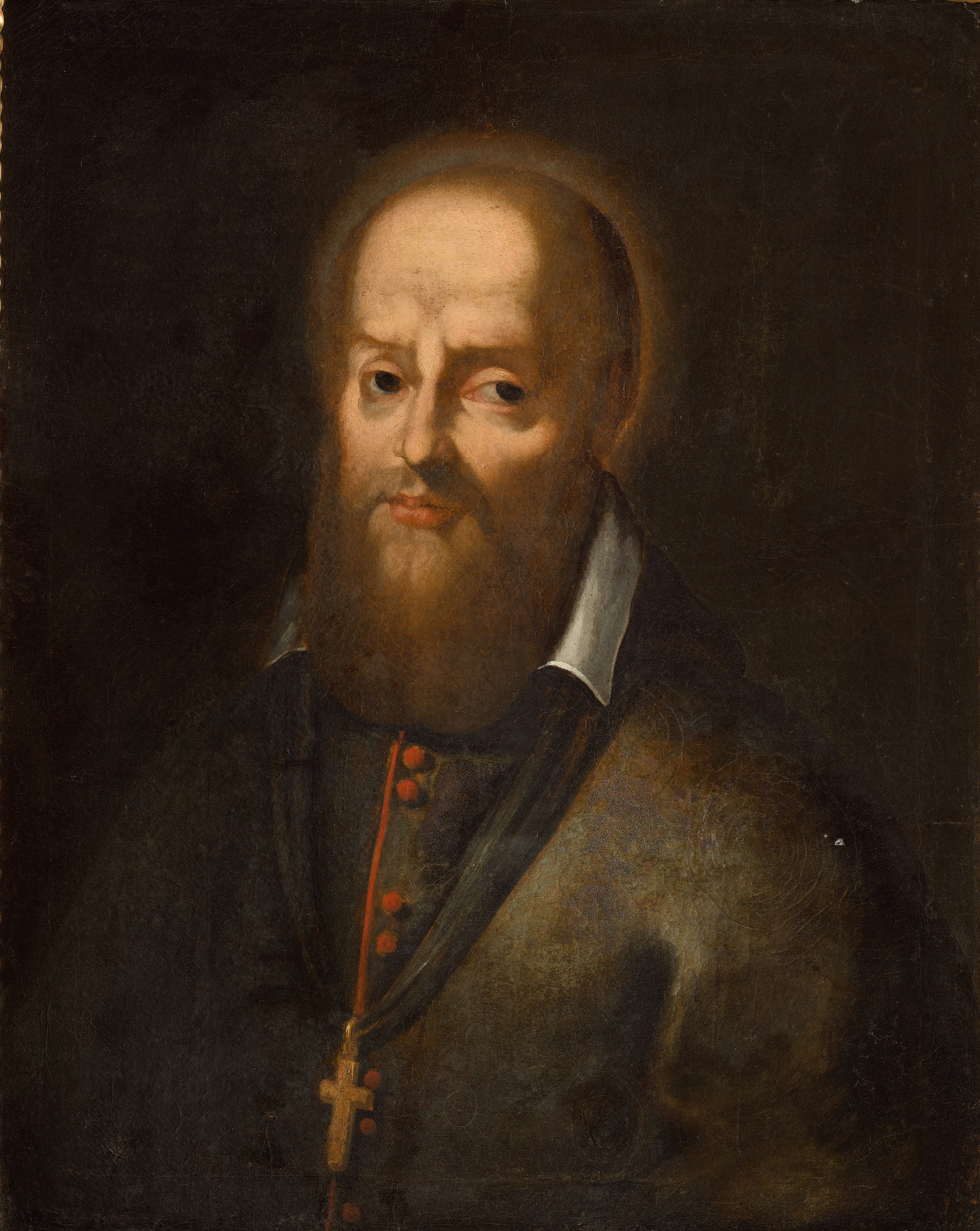
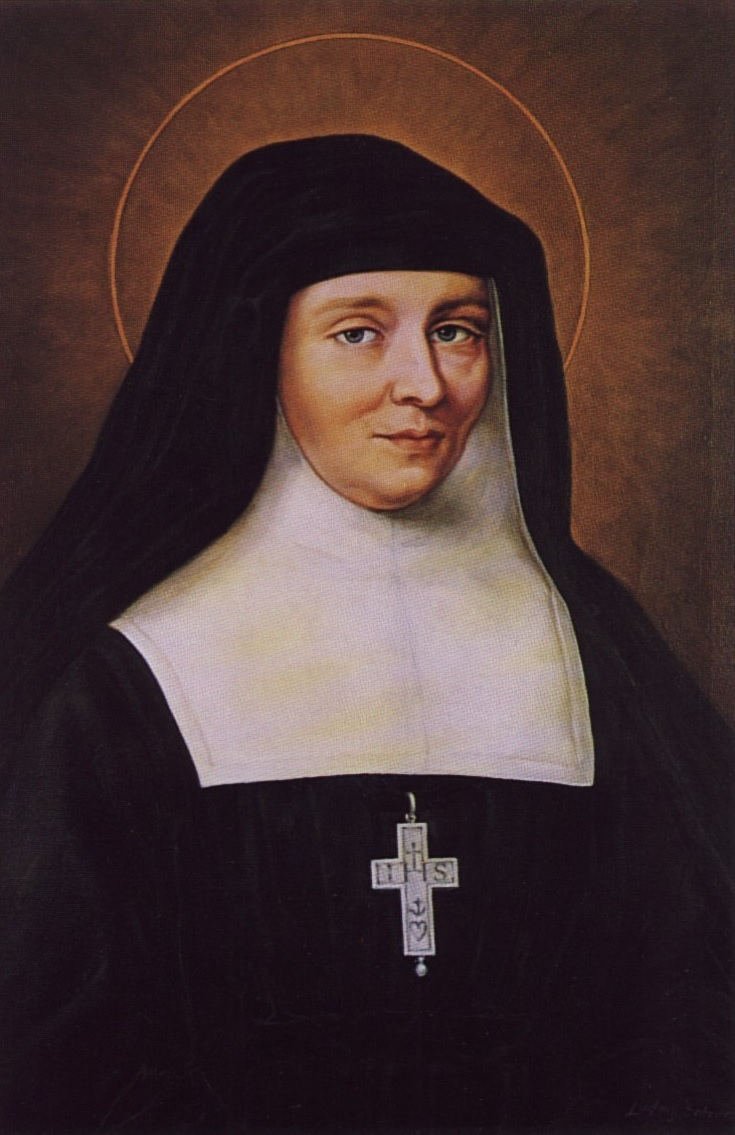
Francis de Sales and Jane de Chantal were the founders of the religious Order of the Visitation.

The Order of the Visitation was founded in 1610 by Francis de Sales and Jane Frances de Chantal in Annecy, Haute-Savoie, France. At first, the founder had not a religious order in mind; he wished to form a congregation without external vows, where the cloister should be observed only during the year of novitiate, after which the sisters should be free to go out by turns to visit the sick and poor. The Order was given the name of The Visitation of Holy Mary with the intention that the sisters would follow the example of Virgin Mary and her joyful visit to her kinswoman Elizabeth, an event celebrated in Christianity as "The Visitation".

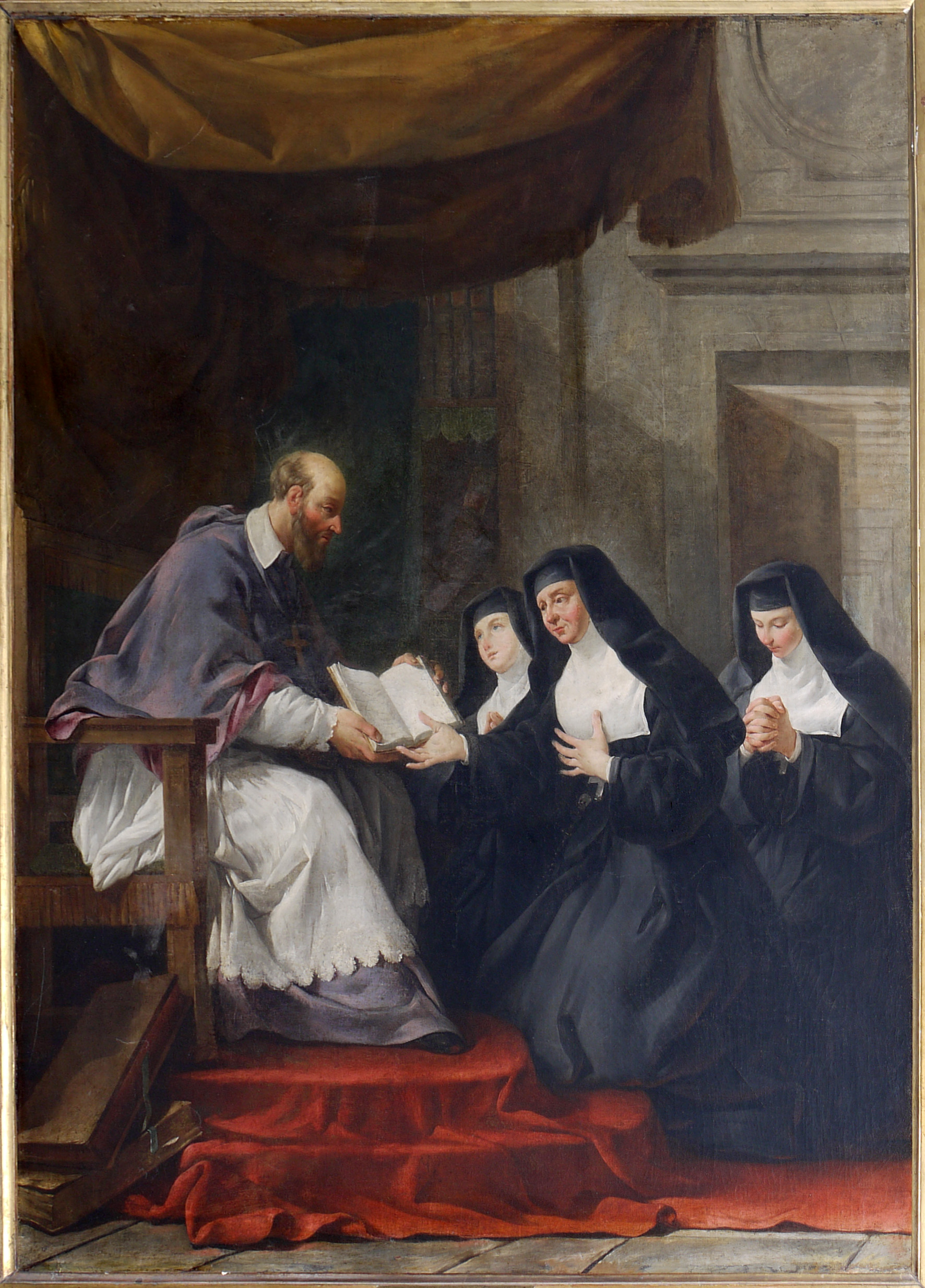
Saint Francis de Sales giving the Rule for the Order of the Visitation of Holy Mary to Saint Jane Frances de Chantal

De Sales invited Jane de Chantal to join him in establishing a new type of religious life, one open to older women and those of delicate constitution, that would stress the hidden, inner virtues of humility, obedience, poverty, even-tempered charity, and patience, and founded on the example of Mary in her journey of mercy to her cousin Elizabeth. The order was established to welcome those not able to practice austerities required in other orders. Instead of chanting the canonical office in the middle of the night, the sisters recited the Little Office of the Blessed Virgin Mary at half-past eight in the evening. There was no perpetual abstinence nor prolonged fasting. The Order of the Visitation of Mary was canonically erected in 1618 by Paul V who granted it all the privileges enjoyed by the other orders. A bull of Urban VIII solemnly approved it in 1626.

== Charism ==
The special charism of the Visitation Order is an interior discipline expressed primarily through the practice of two virtues: humility and gentleness. The motto of the order is "Live Jesus".

== Expansion ==
A foundation was established in Lyons in 1615 followed by Moulines (1616), Grenoble (1618), Bourges (1618), and Paris (1619). When Francis de Sales died (1622) there were 13 convents established; at the death of Jane Frances de Chantal in 1641 there were 86. The order spread from France throughout Europe and to North America. As of 2021, there are about 150 autonomous Visitation monasteries throughout the world.

=== Portugal ===
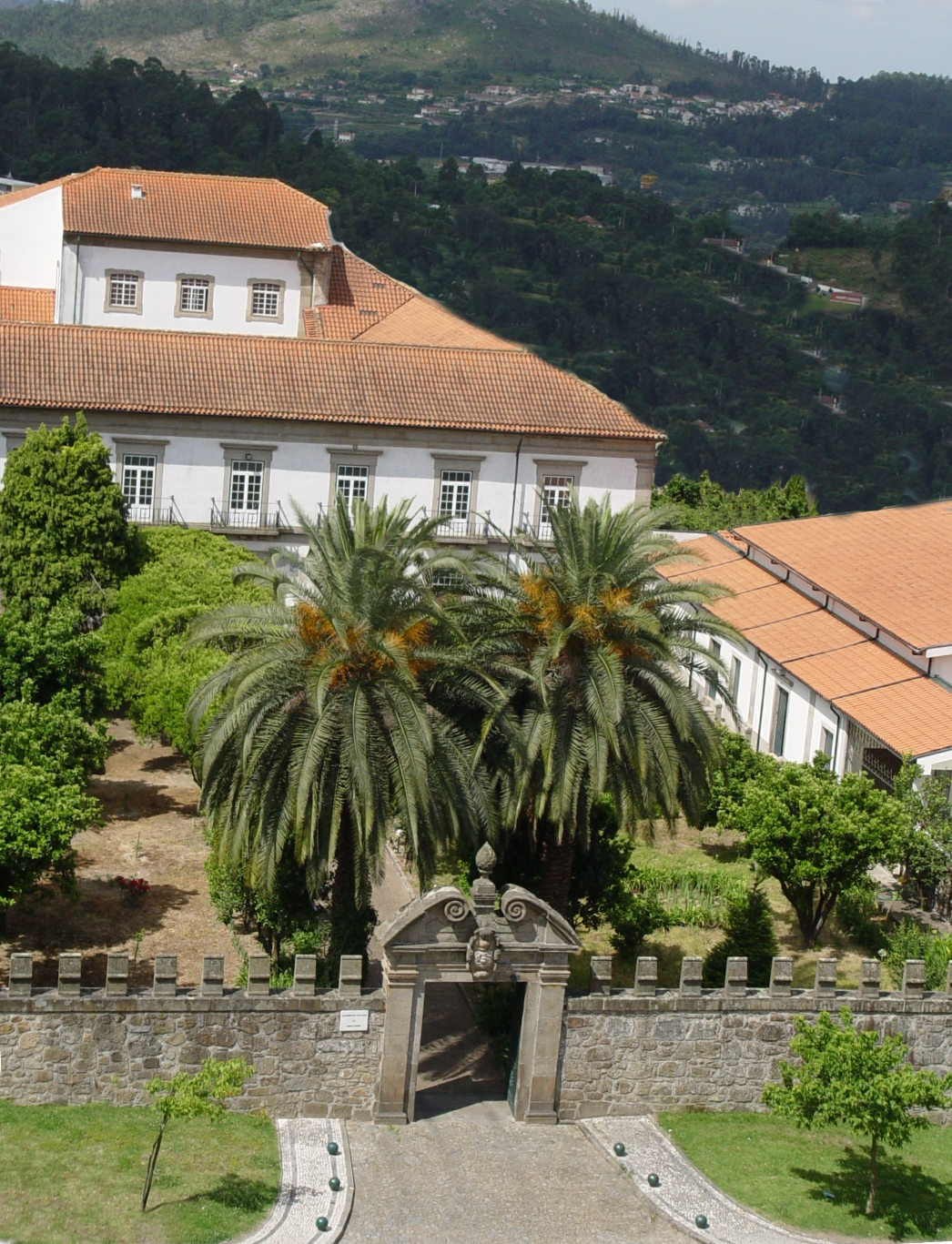
The Monastery of the Visitandine nuns in Braga, Portugal.

The Order of the Visitation has been present in Portugal since 1784, maintaining today three monasteries: in Braga, in Vila das Aves and in Batalha. The Sisters of the Visitation in Portugal produce and distribute the emblems of the Sacred Heart of Jesus (like devotional scapulars) as Margaret Mary Alacoque did in the past.

=== England ===
At the French Revolution in 1789 when all the religious houses were suppressed many of the French Sisters took refuge in other Catholic countries. The sisters in Rouen, northern France, fled to Portuguese monasteries, having only escaped the guillotine by the death of Robespierre in 1794. In 1803 six sisters left Lisbon in an English packet ship and while at sea they were attacked by French pirates. They were spared because of their nationality (they were French not English) and were returned safely to the Spanish seaport of Vigo. After a brief sojourn in Spain three of the Sisters made a second attempt to cross from Porto and without further encounters with pirates arrived in Falmouth on 29 January 1804. They later journeyed to Acton and founded the first monastery of the Visitation on English soil on 19 March 1804. They subsequently re-located to Waldron.

=== Germany ===
In 1835, the Order of the Visitation of Holy Mary of Dietramszell acquired Beuerberg Abbey (Kloster Beuerberg), in Eurasburg, Germany. Between 1846 and 1938 they ran a girls' school and a home for nursing mothers at Beuerberg Abbey, and afterwards an old people's convalescent home. The abbey still belongs to the Order of the Visitation of Holy Mary.

=== Colombia ===
The nine Visitation Sisters from Madrid, Spain came to Colombia in 1892 and founded the first Monastery at Santa Fe, Bogotá.

=== Ireland ===
The Visitation Sisters came to Ireland in 1955 and founded a Monastery at Stamullen, Co. Meath. When Mother Mary Teresa O’ Dwyer, Superior of the Visitation Monastery of Roseland, England learned that the Brothers of St. John of God were moving out of Silverstream, she applied to the Bishop of Meath for permission for the Order of the Visitation to enter his diocese. Staffing problems were solved by borrowing three Sisters from America. The Visitation Monasteries of St. Paul Minnesota, Brooklyn New York and Atlanta Georgia each lent a Sister.

=== Korea ===
In 2005, six Visitation Sisters from Manizales, Colombia, came to South Korea. The Monastery of the Visitation was established in Jeongok-eup, Yeoncheon County, in Gyeonggi Province, South Korea.

=== Poland ===
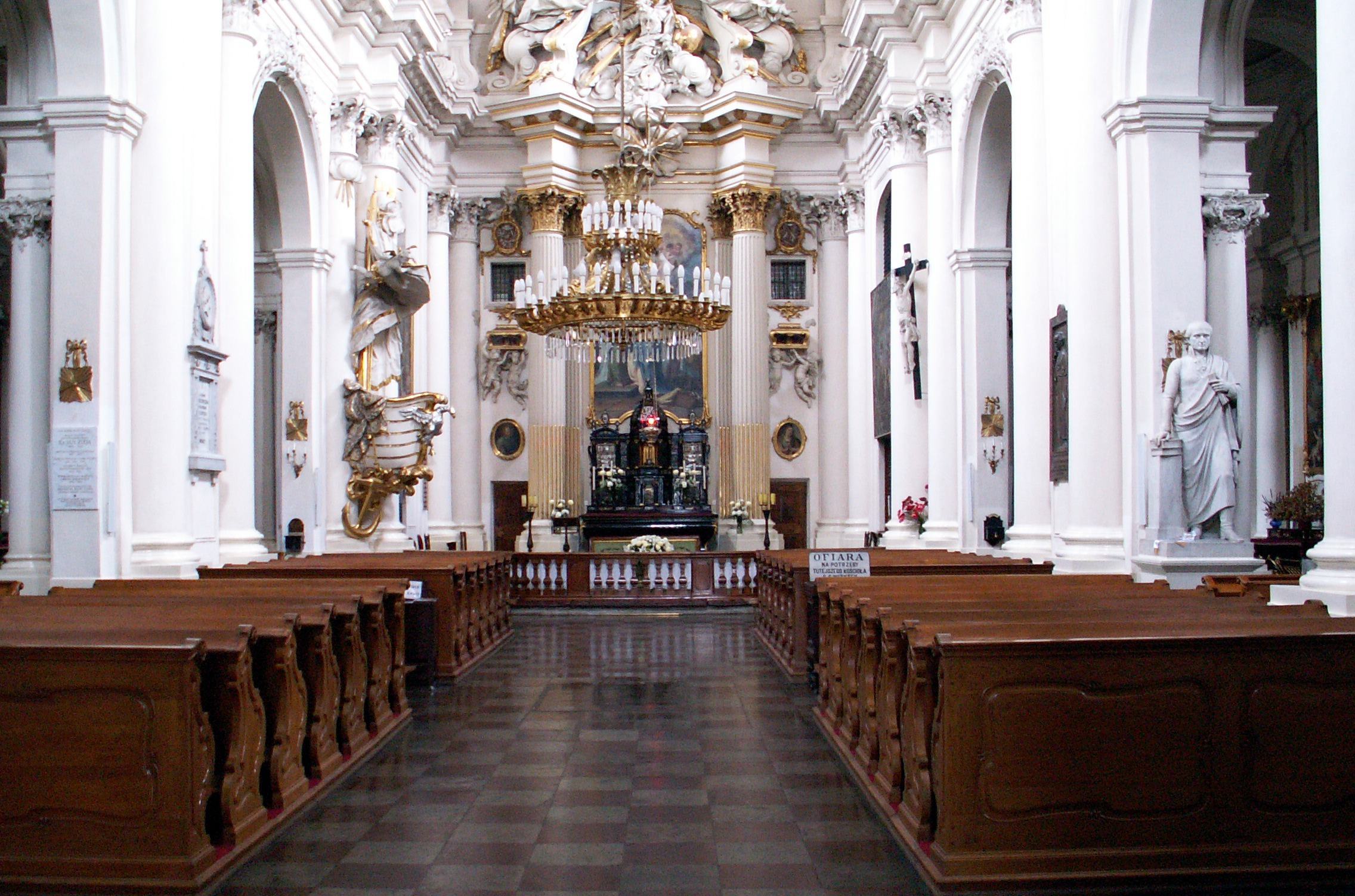
The Visitationist Church in Warsaw (interior).

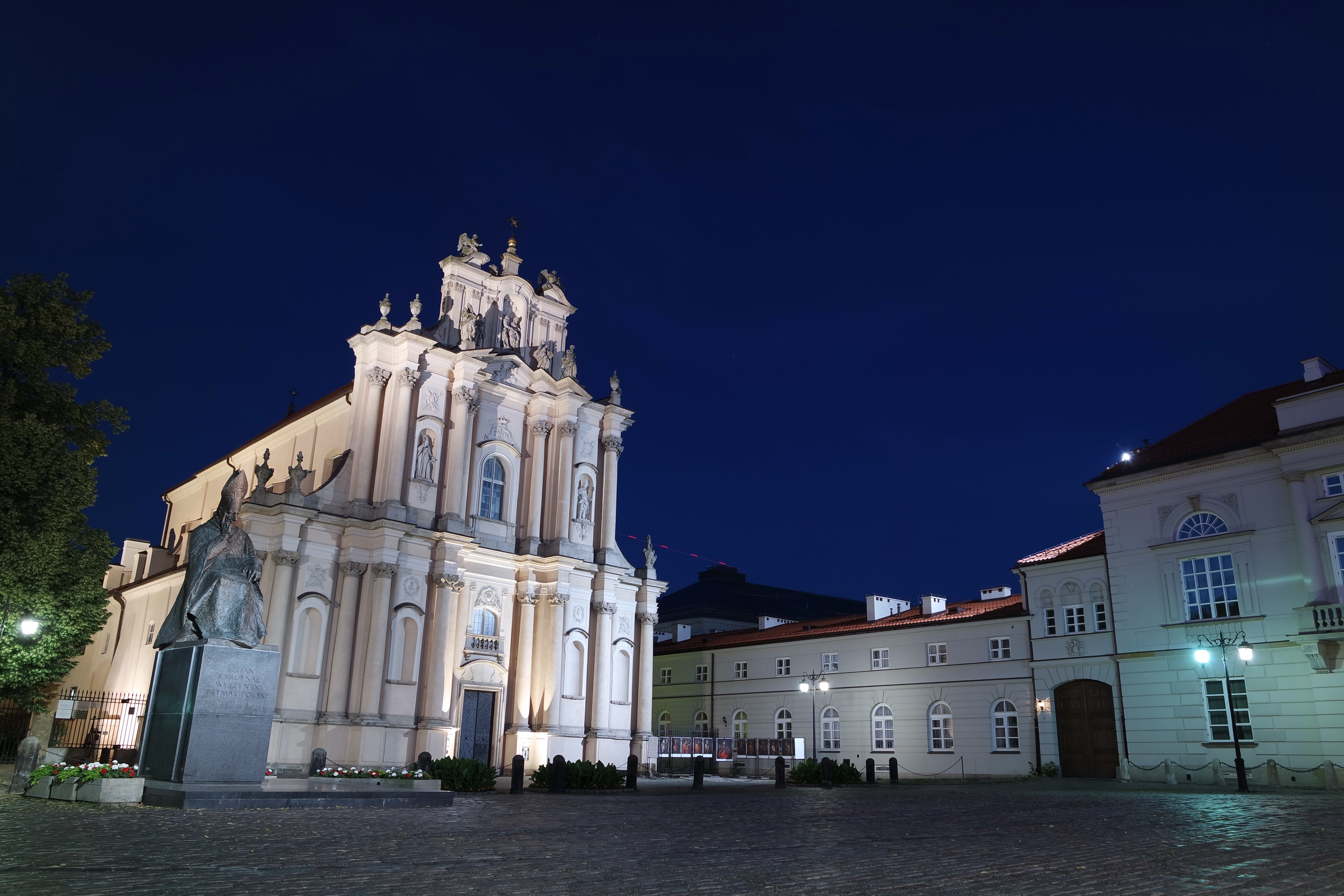
The Visitationist Church in Warsaw.

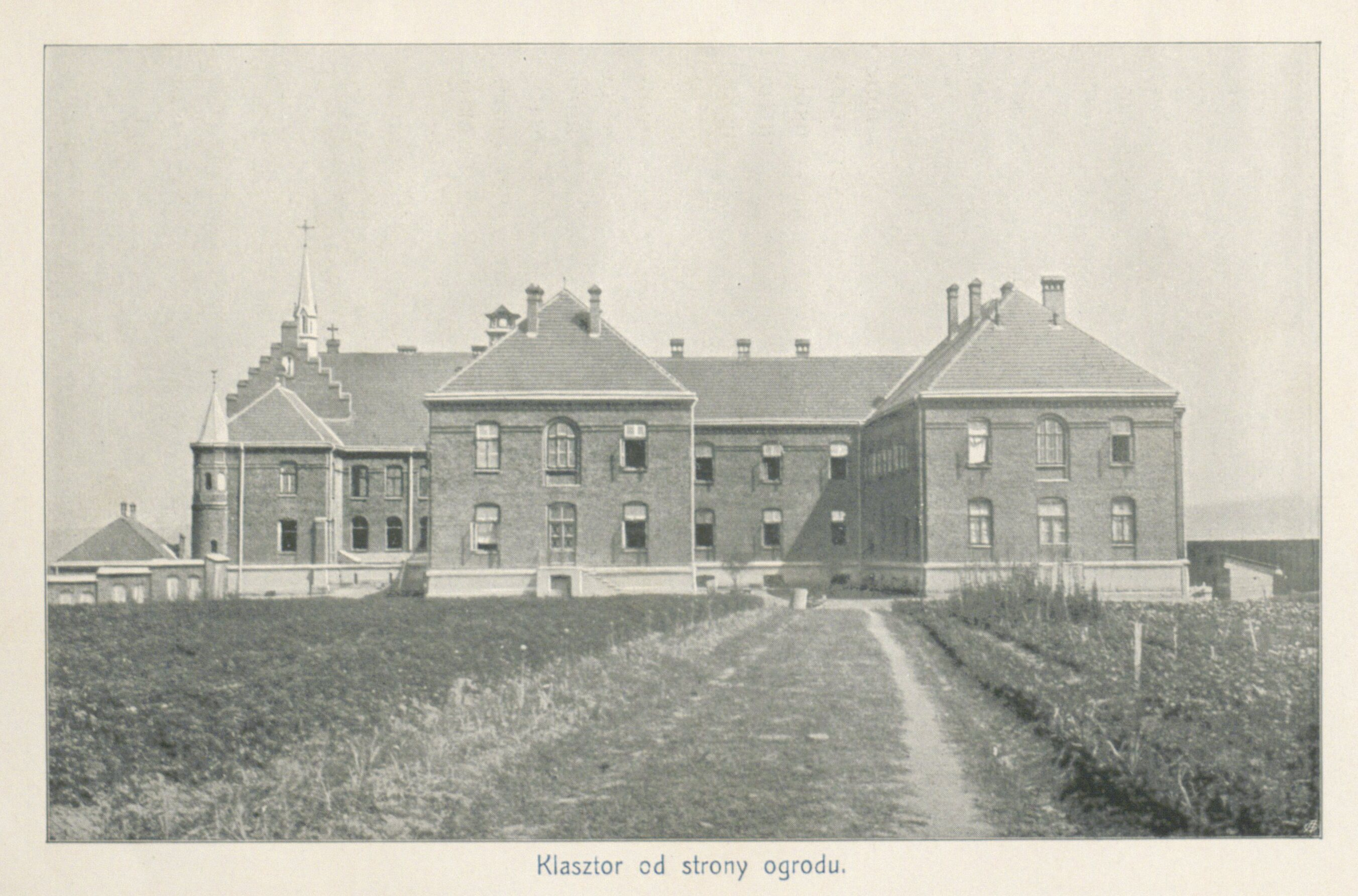
The old Jasło convent (1905).

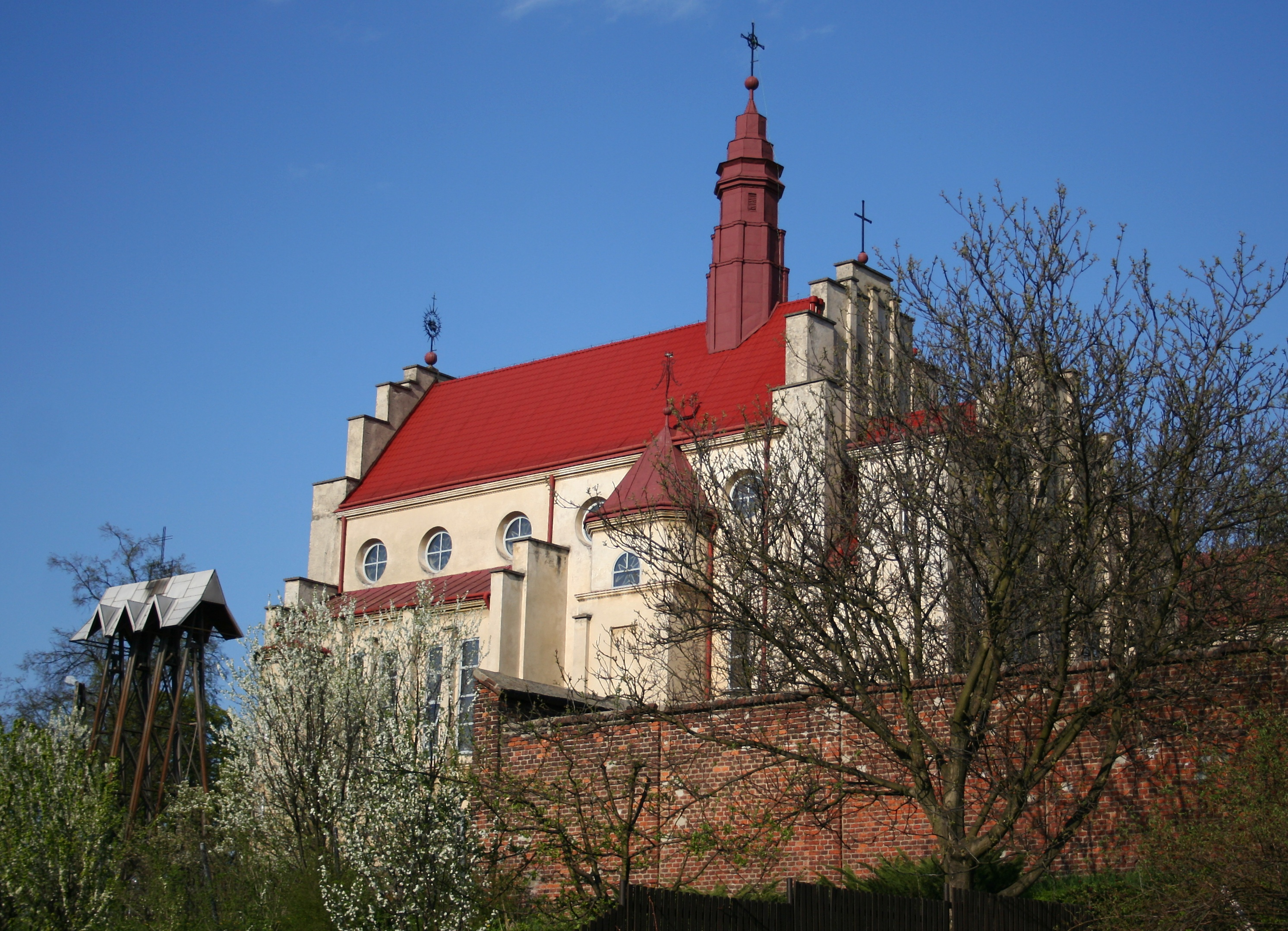
The new Visitationist Church in Jasło.

The Visitation Sisters (Polish: Zakon Nawiedzenia Najświętszej Marii Panny, or, siostry wizytki) were first invited to the Polish-Lithuanian Commonwealth by the Polish queen-consort Marie Louise Gonzaga, who was heavily involved as a patron and supporter of the Catholic church. Her wish came to pass with the arrival of 12 nuns to Warsaw. The Warsaw Visitandines' numbers would quickly increase and the convent funded two more, in Kraków and Vilnius, before 1700. Following the partitions, the order was robbed multiple times by foreign armies and it suffered under sanctions imposed by the occupying powers. Currently there are four Visitationist convents in Poland.

==== Warsaw ====
The first convent was built on Krakowskie Przedmieście, near a royal residence. The nuns were officially enclosed the same year, 1654, however soon after, they would have to leave their cloister twice due to threats from hostile armies - this would happen again some centuries later, when the sisters were driven out to house Napoleonic soldiers. Since their founding, Wizytki, as they are called, managed schools and pensions for girls, taking care of the urban poor. The sisters were forbidden from teaching after the fall of the January Uprising (1864), as one of the many efforts by the Tsar to erase any Polish national influence in education - along with the pension, the novitiate was closed, meaning no new sisters could be taken in. Wizytki only resumed training novices in 1905. The oldest of the Visitationist convents was also involved in the Warsaw Uprising, when the sisters voluntarily opened their cloister to guests and sheltered the vulnerable civilian population. As stewards of one of the most prominent historical landmarks in Warsaw, the sisters were also involved in art conservation. Under communist rule, the same convent was a space of contact and exchange with clergy in countries such as Hungary or Czechoslovakia.

==== Kraków ====
The convent in Kraków attributes its conception to a miracle performed by Francis de Sales, who answered the prayer of bishop and founder Jan Małachowski when the latter was drowning in the frozen Vistula river. Five nuns from the Warsaw convent moved to Kraków the very same winter, but the enclosed convent proper would only be established in the summer of 1682, the following year. In Kraków too, the sisters were heavily involved with girls' education, which was the only reason the convent was not forced to disband under Austrian occupation. Thanks to its good reputation, it even received foreign students. During and after the first world war, the convent came to rely on goodwill for income.

==== Jasło ====
The aforementioned convent in Vilnius was disbanded and the sisters forcefully expelled to France in 1841 by the order of Tsar Nicholas I. In 1901, the Visitandines came from Versailles to Poland, where they found a new home in a newly-built convent in Jasło, that received them officially in 1903. Like its sister convents, the Visitandines of Jasło managed a pension for women and girls, although its capacity as a school was not formally recognised; their educational activity ceased with the outbreak of World War I. During World War II, the sisters were once again displaced and the convent first converted to a war hospital and then detonated. The Visitandines returned to the ruins in the 1950s and the slow process of rebuilding begun; in 1966, the church was consecrated again as part of the wider celebrations of 1000-year anniversary of Catholicism in Poland.

==== Rybnik ====
In 1942, the Visitandines of Vilnius were expelled once again. They were forbidden from wearing the habit and had to live among civilians for the remainder of World War II. In 1946, the bishop Stanisław Adamski invited them to Siemanowice Śląskie. In the year 2000, the convent in Siemanowice was closed and the sisters moved to Rybnik. The Visitandine sisters in Rybnik are mostly elderly.

=== United States ===
In the United States there are 10 monasteries in two federations. The monasteries of the First Federation live the purely contemplative life, observing papal enclosure, with solemn vows, and have retained the traditional habit of the order. Of the ten monasteries of the Visitation in the United States, six belong to the First Federation.

==== First federation ====
- The Convent of the Visitation in Mobile, Alabama was founded in 1833 by Bishop Michael Portier, first bishop of Mobile. Aware of the lack of schools in his diocese, he remembered the fine work of the Visitation nuns throughout his native France. Five nuns from the monastery in Georgetown, Washington, D.C. boarded a sailing ship in November 1832 and arrived in Mobile a month later. In March 1840, a tornado leveled the buildings. In the 1950s the school was converted to a retreat house. The monastery also serves as a distribution center for communion breads used by churches throughout the Mobile Archdiocese and for many churches in surrounding states, a service extended to a number of non-Catholic churches as well
- In 1866 Visitation Sisters from Baltimore, Maryland came to Richmond, Virginia at the request of Bishop John McGill. In 1987 the Visitation Sisters relocated to Rockville, Virginia (where they continue to bake altar breads as their main source of income).
  - In 1846, 11 of the Georgetown Visitation sisters relocated to Frederick, Maryland to carry on a school began by the Sisters of Charity in 1824, which from that date became the Visitation Academy of Frederick - which had an important part in Civil War history when it was occupied in September 1862 (until January 1863) by Union Troops and became General Hospital #5 following the Battles of South Mountain and Antietam. In the spring of 2005 the Visitation Monastery closed its doors and the remaining three Visitation Sisters transferred to the Monastery of the Visitation of Holy Mary Monte Maria in Rockville, Virginia.
- The Visitation community of Tyringham, Massachusetts was founded in 1853 in Keokuk, Iowa by the Visitation Monastery of Montluel, France. In the 19th Century, it was necessary for Visitation communities, both in France and in the United States, to have academies for girls in order to support themselves. After having moved from Keokuk, Iowa, to Suspension Bridge, New York, and then, lastly, to Wilmington, Delaware in 1868, a generous benefactress enabled the community to close the school in 1893 and live the full contemplative life. In 1993 the community relocated to Massachusetts and moved into its present monastery, Mont Deux Coeurs, in December 1995.
- The Visitation nuns were founded in Toledo from Georgetown in 1915 at the invitation of Bishop Joseph Schrembs.
- The Monastery of the Visitation was established in Atlanta Georgia and moved to Snellville, Georgia in 1974.
- Philadelphia, Pennsylvania.

==== Second federation ====
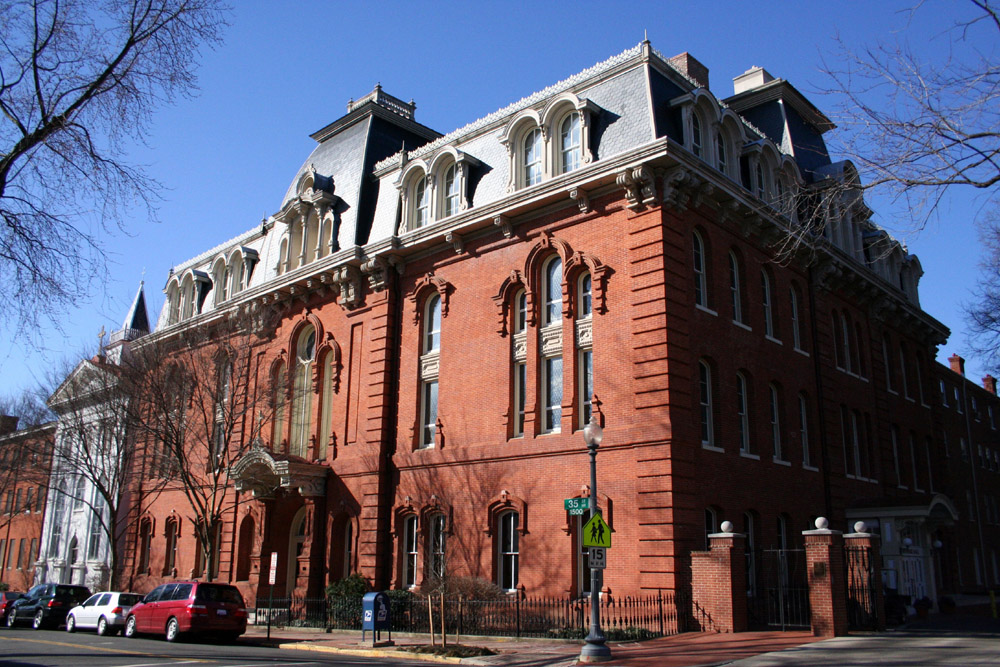
Georgetown Visitation Monastery.

Sisters of the Second Federation add apostolic work to their contemplative life.

- Georgetown Visitation Monastery was the first house of the Visitation founded in the United States. In 1799, three sisters in the order were given permission by Archbishop Leonard Neale to start a girls' school located next to Georgetown University, in Washington, D.C., called the Georgetown Visitation Preparatory School. In 1816, the Georgetown Visitation Monastery was founded with Teresa Lalor as superior.
- On May 3, 1833, eight sisters from the Georgetown Visitation founded the first Visitation Academy in the midwest at Kaskaskia, Illinois. On the final leg of their trip from Georgetown, the Sisters crossed the Mississippi River from Missouri into Illinois. First person accounts tell of the Sisters "sitting in a ferryboat that took them across the river. They sat dangerously close to the brown water." In April 1844, six sisters left to begin the Visitation Academy of St. Louis in St. Louis, Missouri. On June 24, the flooding Mississippi River forced evacuation from Kaskaskia, and a steamboat bearing visitors to the monastery rescued sisters, students, and furnishings through the second story windows, and transported them to St. Louis. In 1992, five sisters from the Rock Island, Illinois Visitation merged with the St. Louis community. Later eleven sisters from St. Louis relocated to the Mercy Sisters' retirement facility, Catherine's House, in St. Louis.
- The Visitation monastery in Brooklyn, New York was founded in 1855 by sisters from Baltimore.
- In 1873, six Sisters of the Visitation from St. Louis, Missouri traveled by steamship for eight days up the Mississippi river to the fast-growing river town of St. Paul, Minnesota at the request of Bishop Grace, who asked them to make a new foundation and to open a school, Convent of the Visitation School; together, the school and monastery moved four times as they expanded. In 1966, the sisters and school moved to Mendota Heights, where the larger facility allowed for expanded programs and enrollment. The Mendota monastery was slated to close in mid-January 2019, with the remaining three sisters moving to a health care facility or other Visitation monastery. The school — now simply called Visitation School — remains today at the Mendota Heights campus.
  - In 1989, the Leadership of the Second Federation of the Visitation Order in the United States of America established an urban monastic community in Minneapolis, Minnesota. As part of their ministry to families they offer education sessions, such as cooking and nutrition, finance and budgeting, college preparation, etc. for neighborhood teens.

The Mount de Chantal Visitation Academy was founded in 1848 as the Wheeling Female Academy in downtown Wheeling, West Virginia and in 1865 assumed its current name. While grades five through twelve were all female, Mount de Chantal's Montessori and Elementary schools were co-ed. The school ceased operations on May 31, 2008, and the nuns relocated to the Georgetown Visitation in Washington, D.C. The building was listed on the National Register of Historic Places in 1978, before being razed on November 7, 2011.

== Notable Visitandines ==
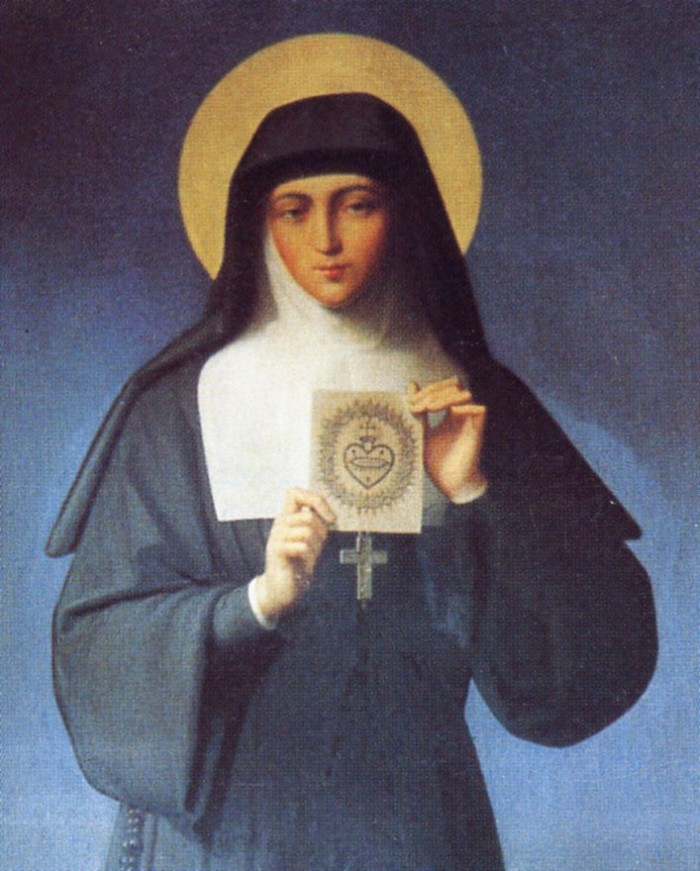
Margaret Mary Alacoque

A notable saint of the order is Margaret Mary Alacoque, who reportedly received the revelations of the Sacred Heart of Jesus resulting in the First Friday Devotion, the Holy Hour and the Feast of the Sacred Heart.

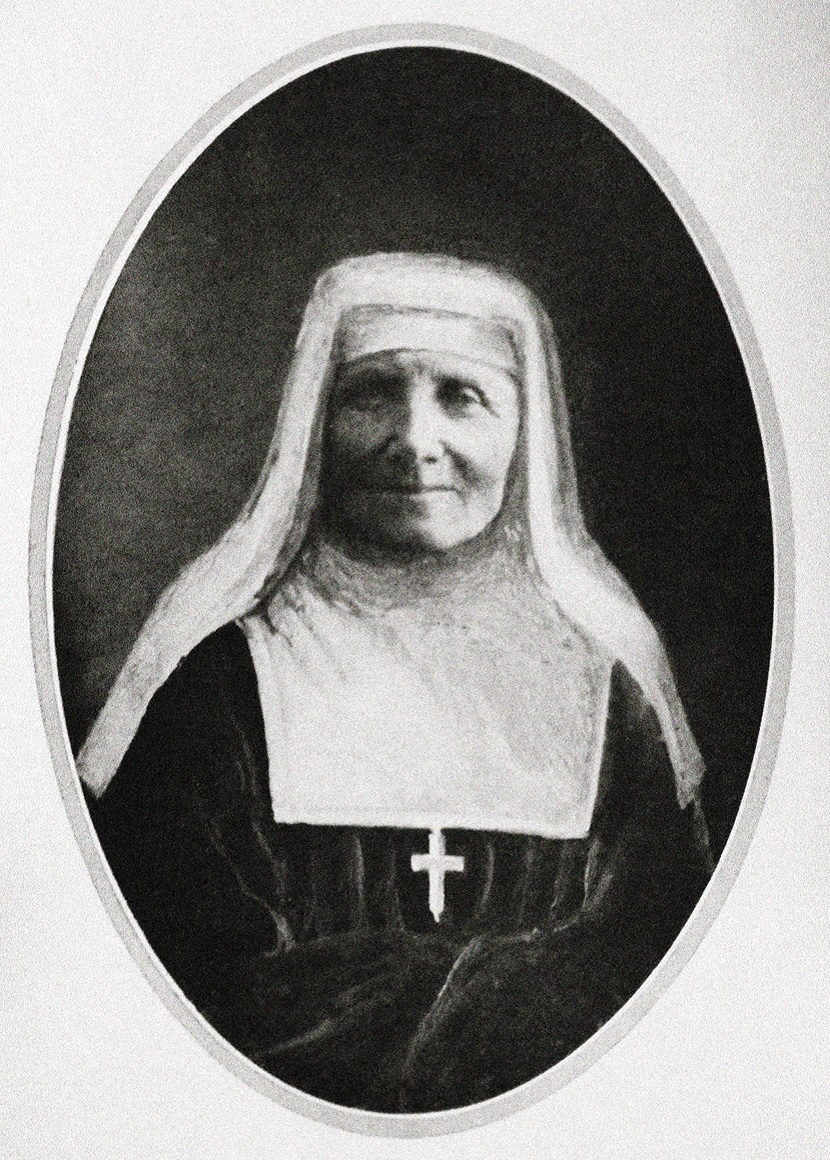
Marie Martha Chambon

Another notable figure of the Visitation Order was Marie Martha Chambon, known for having reported a series of revelations from Jesus and having introduced, at the beginning of the 20th century, the devotion of the Chaplet of the Holy Wounds (or "Holy Wounds Rosary").

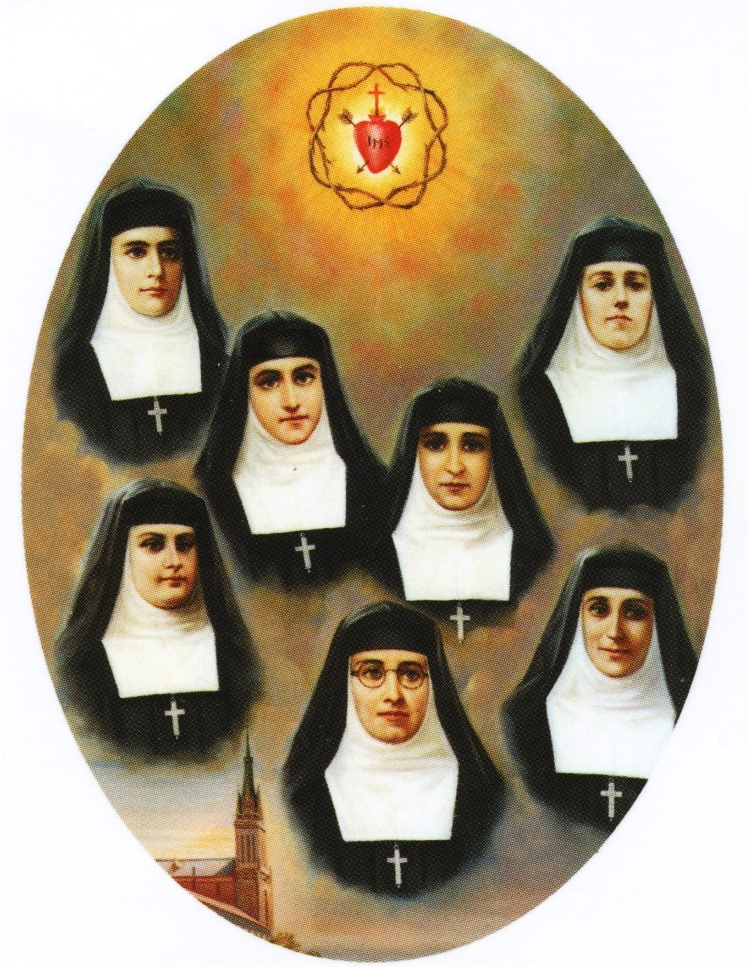
Spanish Visitandine nuns martyrs

On May 10, 1998, seven Visitandine nuns of the First Monastery of Madrid, Spain, martyred during the Spanish Revolution of 1936, were beatified in Rome by Pope John Paul II.

- Maria Gabriela de Hinojosa Naveros (b. July 24, 1872 in Alhama, Granada)
- Teresa Maria Cavestany y Anduaga (b. July 30, 1888 in Puerto Real, Cadiz)
- Josefa Maria Barrera Izaguirre (b. May 23, 1881 in El Ferrol, La Coruna)
- Maria Ines Zudaire Galdeano (b. January 28, 1900 in Echavarri, Navarre)
- Maria Cecilia Cendoya Araquistain (b. January 10, 1910 in Azpeitia, Guipuzcoa)
- Maria Engracia Lecuona Aramburu (b. July 2, 1897 in Oyarzun Guipuzcoa)
- Maria Angela Olaizola Garagarza (b. November 12, 1893 in Azpeitia Guipuzcoa

The nuns were members of the Madrid House of the Order of the Visitation. In early 1936, during the Spanish Civil War, as religious persecution intensified, most of the community moved to Oronoz, leaving a group of six nuns in the charge of Sr Maria Gabriela de Hinojosa. By July they were confined to their apartment, When a neighbour reported them to the authorities, and in November 1936 their apartment searched. Nevertheless, they refused to seek refuge in the consulates.

The following evening, a patrol of the Iberian Anarchist Federation broke into the apartment and ordered all the sisters to leave. They were taken by van to a vacant area and shot. Maria Cecilia, who had run when she felt the sister next to her fall, surrendered shortly after and was shot five days later at the cemetery wall in Vallecas on the outskirts of Madrid.

In 2010, in honor of the worldwide Jubilee Year for the Visitation Order, Pope Benedict XVI granted a plenary indulgence to those who would make a visit to and pray in a Visitation monastery.

Léonie Martin (1863-1941), the third sister of Thérèse of Lisieux, became a nun of the Order of the Visitation after many failures and hardships in her life. She received the veil on July 2, 1900 at the Visitation in the French city of Caen and took the name Sister Françoise-Thérèse. On January 24, 2015, the process for Leonie's beatification began and she is now known as Servant of God.

== Saints, Blesseds, and other holy people ==
Saints

- Francis de Sales (21 August 1567 – 28 December 1622). Founder of the Order and Bishop of Geneva, canonized on 8 April 1665
- Jeanne-Françoise de Chantal (23 January 1572 – 13 December 1641), Founder of the Order, canonized on 16 July 1767
- Marguerite-Marie Alacoque (22 July 1647 – 17 October 1690), mystic who promoted devotion to the Sacred Heart of Jesus, canonized on 13 May 1920

Blesseds

- Maria Gabriela de Hinojosa Naveros and 6 Companions (died 18 and 23 November 1936), Martyrs of the Spanish Civil War, beatified on 10 May 1998

Venerables

- Marguerite-Céline Claret de la Touche (15 March 1868 - 14 May 1915), professed religious and founder of the Sisters of Bethany of the Sacred Heart, declared Venerable on 26 June 2006
- Bogner (Mária Margit) Etelka (15 December 1905 - 13 May 1933), Serbo-Hungarian professed religious, declared Venerable on 28 June 2012

Servants of God

- Jeanne-Charlotte de Bréchard (c. 1580 - 18 November 1637), professed religious
- Anne-Madeleine Rémuzat (29 November 1696 - 15 February 1730), professed religious, declared as a Servant of God on 18 February 2013
- Jeanne-Aimée Briolle (31 July 1755 - 7 July 1794), Martyr of the French Revolution
- Thérèse (Marie-Françoise-de-Sales) Chappuis (16 June 1793 - 7 October 1875), professed religious and founder of the Oblates of Saint Francis de Sales
- Marie-Constance Bernaud (Marie of the Sacred Heart) (c. October 1825 - 2 August 1903), professed religious and founder of the Association of the Hour of Presence to the Heart of Jesus
- Françoise (Marie-Marthe) Chambon (6 March 1841 - 21 March 1907), professed religious
- Benigna Consolata Ferrero (6 August 1885 - 1 September 1916), professed religious
- Léonie Martin (3 June 1863 – 17 June 1941), the third sister of Thérèse of Lisieux, declared as a Servant of God on 24 January 2015
- María Concepción (María Angélica) Álvarez Icaza, professed religious, declared as a Servant of God on 11 January 1989

== See also ==
- Convent of the Visitandines de Chaillot
