= Marie-Pauline Martin =

French Catholic nun

Agnes of Jesus OCD
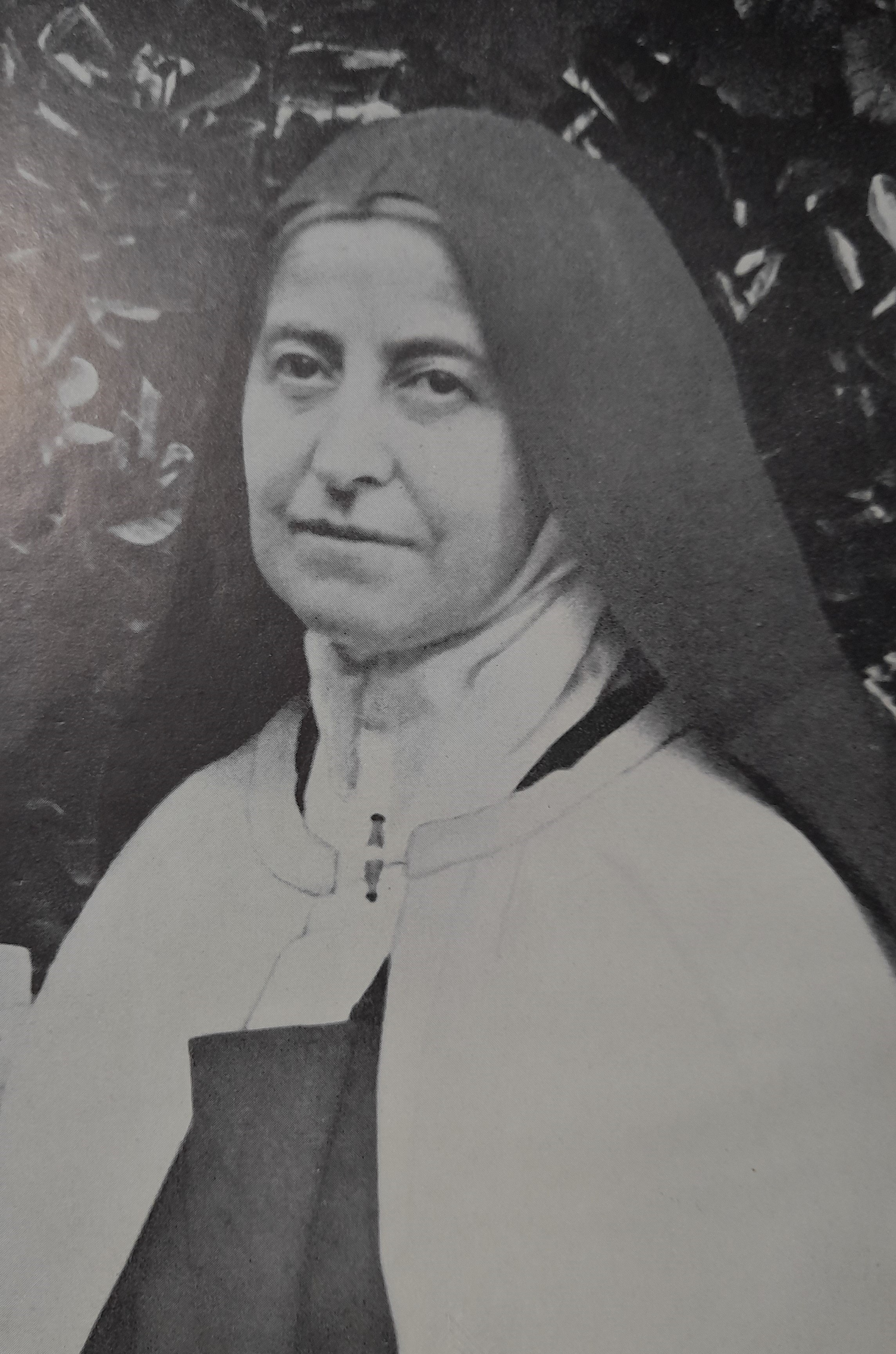
- Born: Marie-Pauline Martin; 7 September 1861; Alençon, Second French Empire
- Died: 28 July 1951 (aged 89); Lisieux, France
- Occupations: Religious sister; prioress
- Relatives: Louis Martin and Marie-Azélie Guérin (parents); Thérèse of Lisieux (sister); Léonie Martin (sister)

Marie-Pauline Martin, known in religion as Agnes of Jesus OCD (7 September 1861 – 28 July 1951), was a French Discalced Carmelite nun and prioress of the Carmel of Lisieux. She was the daughter of Louis and Zélie Martin and an elder sister of Thérèse of Lisieux.

== Life ==
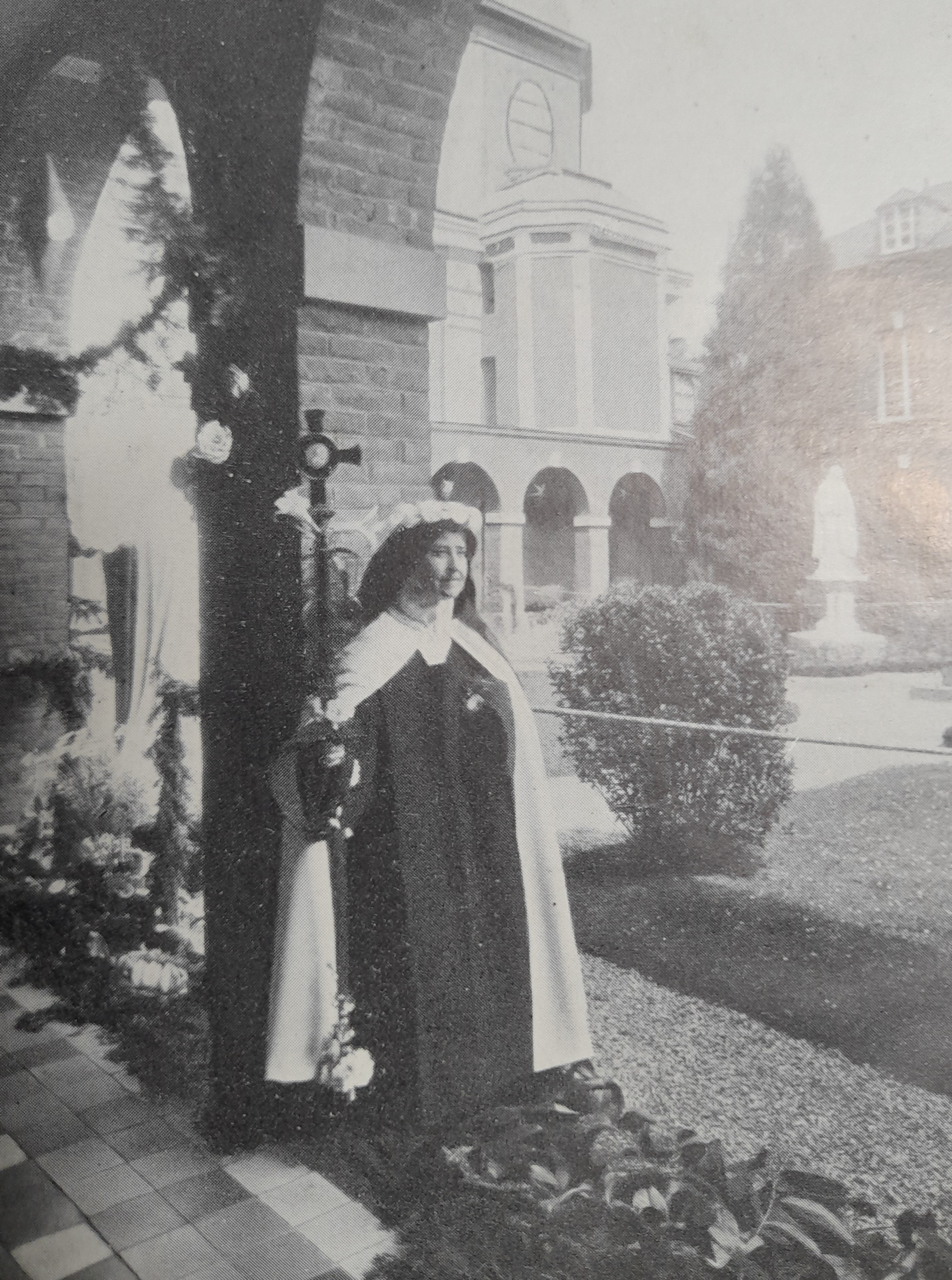
Agnes of Jesus in 1934.

Martin was born on September 7, 1861, in Alençon, during the Second French Empire. She was the second of nine children of Louis Martin and Marie-Azélie Guérin, as well as the older sister of Léonie Martin and Saint Thérèse of Lisieux.

In 1893, Martin was elected to serve as the prioress of the Carmelite convent in Lisieux.

In 1897, with her sister's permission, Pauline helped edit Thérèse's spiritual memoir, Histoire d'une âme (Story of a Soul). Following Thérèse's death, Martin decided to publish the work, making her writings available to the public. In 1910, Martin gave her testimony to the church for Thérèse's canonization, attributing miracles to her sister.

In 1926, Pope Pius XI issued a controversial condemnation of the French right-wing group Action Française, led by the agnostic writer Charles Maurras. Maurras, a lapsed Catholic, objected to the ban and wrote an appeal to Pius XI. Pius XI did not respond to the appeal, but instead wrote to Martin, asking her to pray on the issue. Martin and her convent went beyond Pius's request, and communicated directly with Maurras, in an attempt to revert him to Catholicism. Maurras was receptive, and over the course of 16 years, wrote hundreds of pages of letters back-and-forth with the convent. While he remained agnostic, he nonetheless took part in Catholic pilgrimages and practices with their encouragement. In 1939, after Maurras was arrested for voicing a death threat against the socialist politician Léon Blum, Martin and Pius XI both came out in support of Maurras. In 1939, after Pope Pius XII lifted the ban on Action Française, Maurras wrote the convent a letter, thanking them for their support. Maurras later reverted to Catholicism on his deathbed, and received the last rites.

Martin died on July 25, 1951, in Lisieux, at the age of 89.
