= Louis and Zélie Martin =

French couple saints

Saint Louis Joseph Aloys Stanislaus Martin
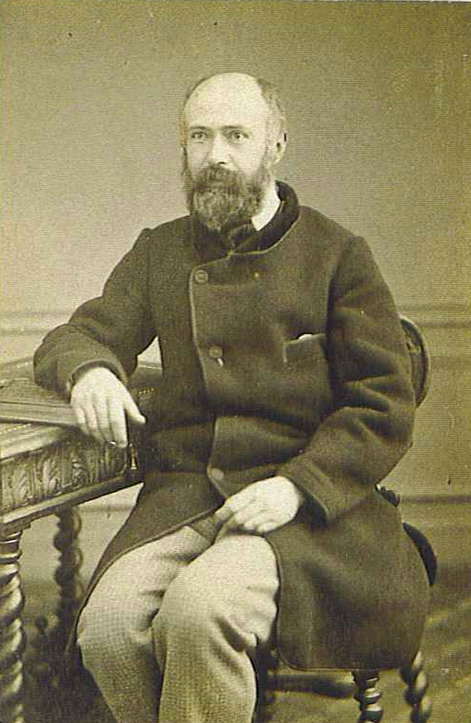
- Born: Louis Joseph Aloys Stanislaus Martin; 22 August 1823; Bordeaux, Gironde, Kingdom of France
- Died: 29 July 1894 (aged 70); Arnières-sur-Iton, Eure, France
- Venerated in: Catholic Church
- Beatified: 19 October 2008, Basilique de Sainte-Thérèse, France by Pope Benedict XVI
- Canonized: 18 October 2015, Saint Peter's Square, Vatican City by Pope Francis
- Feast: 12 July

Saint Azélie-Marie Guérin Martin
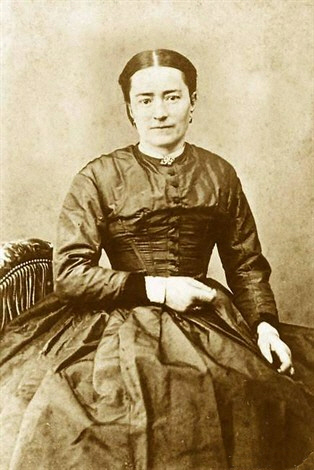
- Born: Azélie-Marie Guérin; 23 December 1831; Gandelain, Orne, Kingdom of France
- Died: 28 August 1877 (aged 45); Alençon, Orne, France
- Venerated in: Catholic Church
- Beatified: 19 October 2008, Basilique de Sainte-Thérèse, France by Pope Benedict XVI
- Canonized: 18 October 2015, Saint Peter's Square, Vatican City by Pope Francis
- Feast: 12 July

Louis Joseph Aloys Stanislaus Martin (22 August 1823 – 29 July 1894) and Azélie-Marie "Zélie" Guérin Martin (23 December 1831 – 28 August 1877) were a French Catholic couple and the parents of five nuns, including Thérèse of Lisieux, a Discalced Carmelite canonized by the Catholic Church in 1925, and her elder sister Léonie Martin, a Visitation Sister declared a Servant of God in 2015. That same year, the couple became the first in Catholic history to be canonized together.

== Early life ==
=== Louis Martin ===
Louis Joseph Aloys Stanislaus Martin was the third of five children of Pierre-François Martin and Marie-Anne-Fanny Boureau. All his siblings died before reaching age 30.

Although Louis intended to become a monk, wishing to enter the Augustinian Great St. Bernard Monastery, he was rejected because he did not succeed at learning Latin. Later he decided to become a watchmaker and studied his craft in Rennes and in Strasbourg.

=== Azélie-Marie Guérin ===
Azélie-Marie Guérin was born in Gandelain Orne, France in 1831. She was the second daughter of Isidore Guérin and Louise-Jeanne Macé. She had an older sister, Marie-Louise, who became a Visitandine nun, and a younger brother, Isidore, who was a pharmacist. Her maternal family was from the Madré, in the neighbouring department of Mayenne, where her grandfather, Louis Macé, was baptised on 16 March 1778.

Zélie wanted to become a nun, but was turned away by the Sisters of Charity of Saint Vincent de Paul due to respiratory difficulties and recurrent headaches. She then prayed for God to give her many children and that they would be consecrated to God. She later decided to become a lacemaker, manufacturing Alençon lace. She fell in love with the watchmaker Louis Martin in 1858 and married him, only three months later, on 13 July 1858, at the Basilica of Notre-Dame in Alençon. Zélie's business became so successful that, in 1870, Louis sold his watchmaking business to go into partnership with her.

== Marriage and family ==
Although the couple lived celibately for ten months after their wedding, they decided to consummate their marriage after a spiritual director encouraged them to do so. They would later have nine children, though only five daughters were to survive childhood:

1. Marie-Louise Martin (22 February 1860 – 19 January 1940), as a nun, Sister Marie of the Sacred Heart, Carmelite at Lisieux;
2. Marie Pauline (7 September 1861 – 28 July 1951), as a nun, Mother Agnès of Jesus, Carmelite at Lisieux;
3. Marie Léonie (3 June 1863 – 17 June 1941), as a nun, Sister Françoise-Thérèse, Visitandine at Caen; candidate for sainthood since January 2015;
4. Marie Hélène (3 October 1864 – 22 February 1870);
5. Joseph Louis (20 September 1866 – 14 February 1867);
6. Joseph Jean-Baptiste (19 December 1867 – 24 August 1868);
7. Marie Céline (28 April 1869 – 25 February 1959), as a nun, Sister Geneviève of the most Holy Face, Carmelite at Lisieux;
8. Marie Mélanie-Thérèse (16 August 1870 – 8 October 1870);
9. Marie Françoise-Thérèse (2 January 1873 – 30 September 1897), as a nun, Sister Thérèse of the Child Jesus and of the Holy Face, Carmelite at Lisieux, canonised in 1925.

As a father, Louis loved nature with a deep sentimental enthusiasm. It was from him that Thérèse inherited her passion for flowers and meadows, and for her native landscape, clouds, thunderstorms, the sea and the stars. He made pilgrimages to Chartres and Lourdes, went to Germany and Austria, travelled twice to Rome and even to Constantinople, and planned, but did not live to carry out, a pilgrimage to the Holy Land. Along with this desire for adventure was an impulse towards withdrawal; in Lisieux Louis arranged a little den for himself high up in the attic, a monastic cell for praying, reading and meditation. His daughters were allowed to enter it only if they wished spiritual converse and self-examination. As in a monastery, he divided the day into worship, garden work and relaxation. As a jeweller and watchmaker, Louis loved the precious things with which he dealt. To his daughters he gave pet names: Marie was his "diamond", Pauline his "noble pearl", Céline "the bold and fearless one", and "the guardian angel". Thérèse was his "little queen ... to whom all treasures belonged".

== Death ==
Zélie died of breast cancer on 28 August 1877 in Alençon, aged 45, leaving her husband and daughters. Her funeral was held in the basilica where she had married Louis. A few weeks later, Louis sold her lacemaking business and their house along Rue St. Blaise, and moved to Lisieux, Normandy, where Zélie's brother Isidore Guérin, a pharmacist, lived with his wife and two daughters.

After Zélie's death, Marie (Louise), Pauline, Thérèse (Françoise-Thérèse), and Céline all became Carmelite nuns, along with a cousin, Marie Guérin. Léonie became a Visitandine nun at Caen after leaving the Poor Clares.

In 1889 Louis suffered two paralyzing strokes followed by cerebral arteriosclerosis, and was hospitalised for three years at the Bon Sauveur Asylum in Caen. In 1892 he returned to Lisieux, where two of his daughters looked after him until his death on 29 July 1894 at Chateau La Musse near Évreux.

== Canonization ==
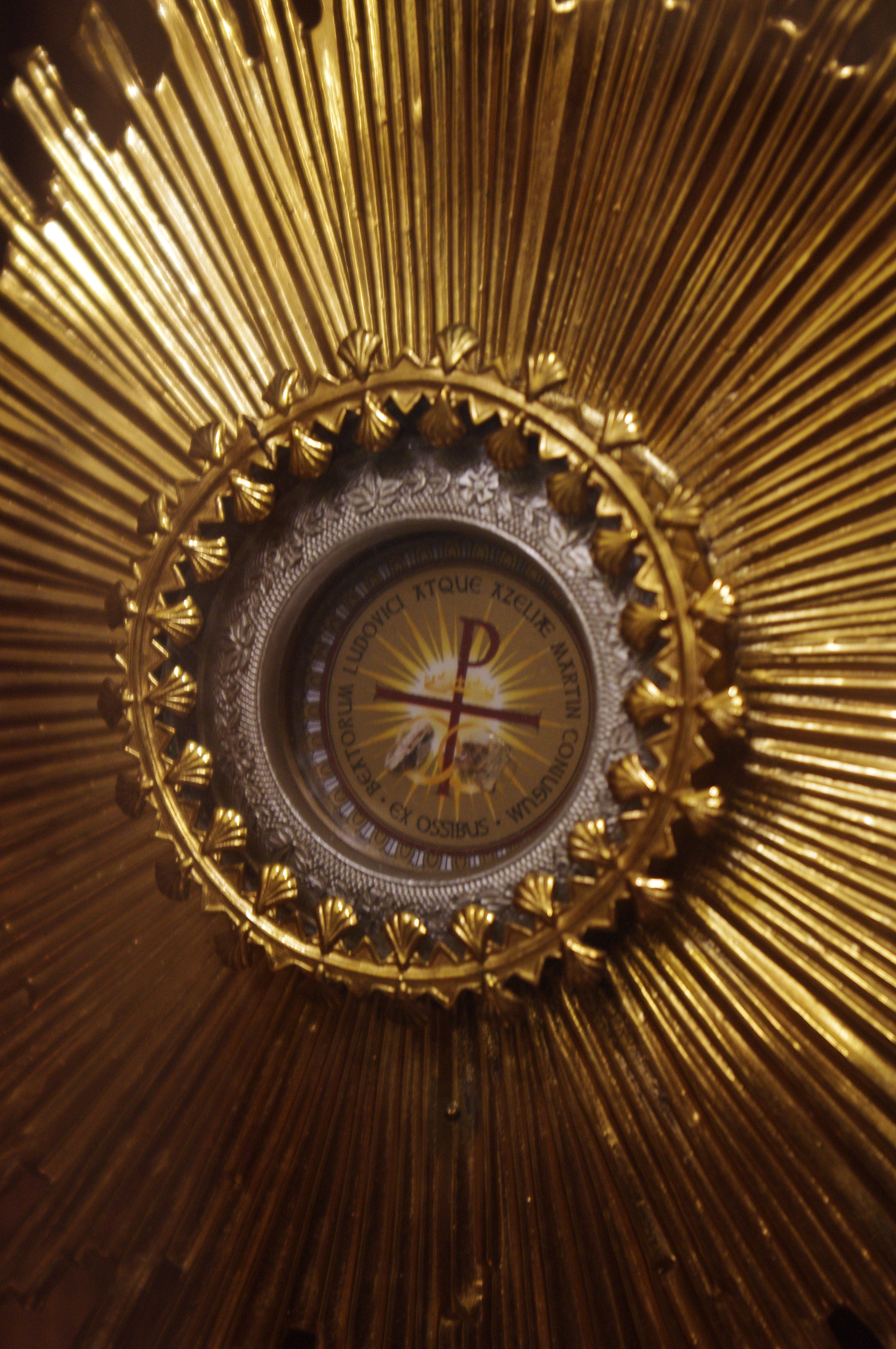
Relics of Louis and Marie-Azélie Guérin Martin at Saint Patrick Church (Columbus, Ohio)

Louis and Zélie were declared "venerable" on 26 March 1994 by Pope John Paul II. They were beatified on 19 October 2008 by José Saraiva Cardinal Martins, the legate of Pope Benedict XVI in the Basilica of Saint Thérèse, Lisieux.

A few months earlier, the Catholic Church had recognized the miracle of Pietro Schilirò, an Italian child cured of lung trouble at their intercession. For Louis and Zélie to be canonized, the Church needed to find that God worked a second miracle at their intercession.

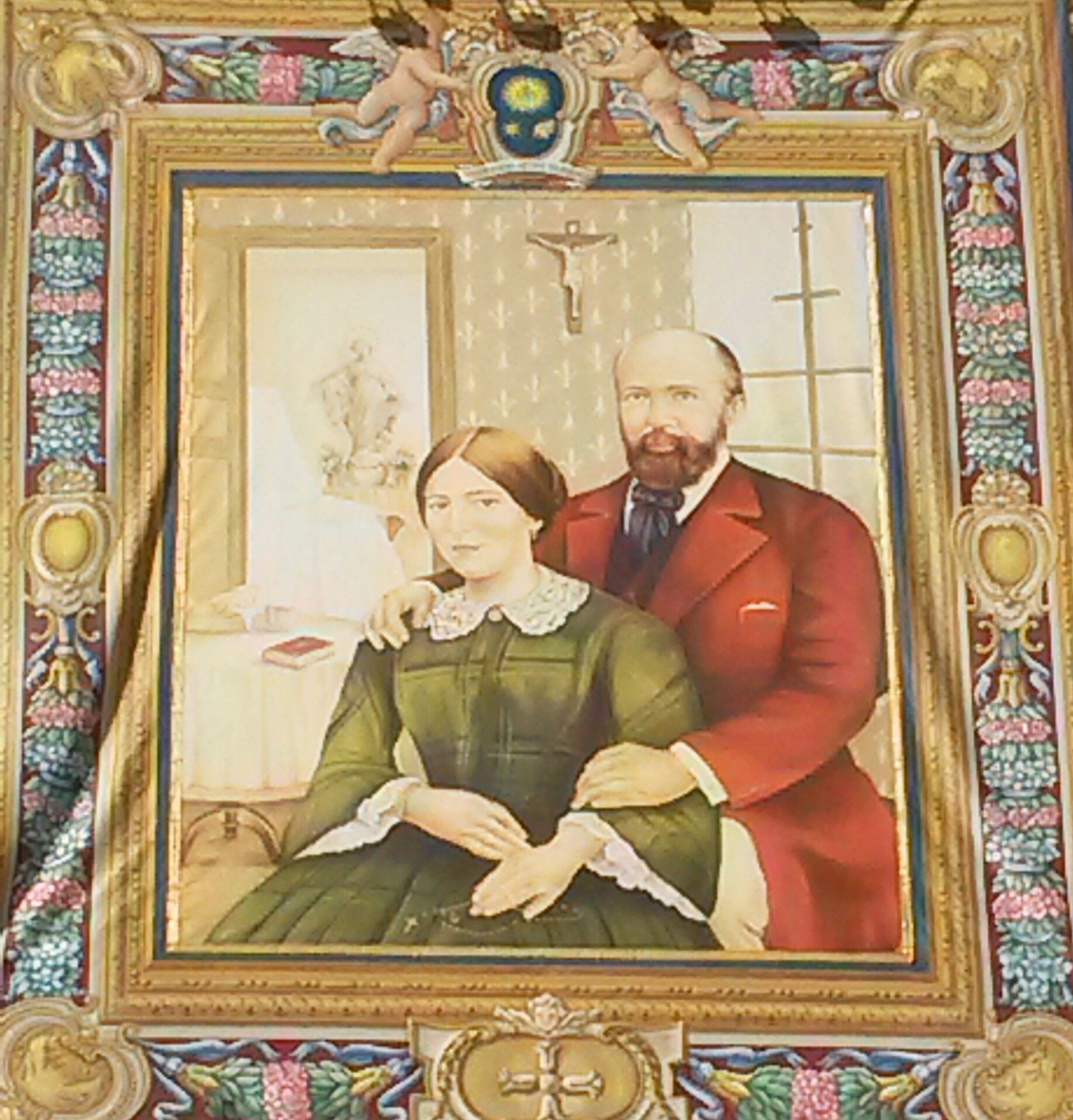
Canonization tapestry in 2015.

On 7 January 2013, Carlos Osoro Sierra, Archbishop of Valencia, presided at the opening of the canonical process to inquire into the healing in 2008 of a girl named Carmen, who was born in Valencia four days before Louis and Zélie were beatified. Eight doctors testified that there was no scientific explanation for her cure.

The diocesan tribunal held its closing session on 21 May 2013, and the file was sent to Rome for review by the Congregation for the Causes of Saints.

On 3 March 2015 Angelo Cardinal Amato announced informally that Louis and Zélie Martin would be declared saints during the Synod of Bishops. The Congregation accepted and promulgated the miracle on 18 March 2015.

On 26 June 2015, Miracle of Life in Valencia, a film produced by the Archdiocese of Valencia about the canonization miracle was released online in English. The next day, at a consistory of cardinals in Rome, Pope Francis approved the decree for the canonization of Louis and Zélie Martin and announced that the ceremony would take place in October in Rome.

On 18 October 2015, Louis and Azélie-Marie Martin were canonized as saints by Pope Francis.

In December 2003, Our Lady's Hospice & Care Services of Harold's Cross, Dublin opened a satellite unit for specialist palliative care in Blackrock, Co. Dublin, provided through the generosity of the Louis and Zelie Martin Foundation. The Foundation was established in 1997 by developer Noel Smyth in memory of his nephew Luke, and named in honor of the Martins.

== Publications ==
In 2011, the letters of Zélie and Louis Martin were published in English as A Call to a Deeper Love: The Family Correspondence of the Parents of Saint Therese of the Child Jesus, 1863–1885 (ISBN 0818913215). Although only 16 letters from Louis survive, many of Zélie's 216 letters give vivid details about the family's life and Louis's character as a father.

== See also ==
- Secular Franciscan Order
