= Léonie Martin =

French nun (1863–1941)

Servant of God Françoise-Thérèse Martin VHM
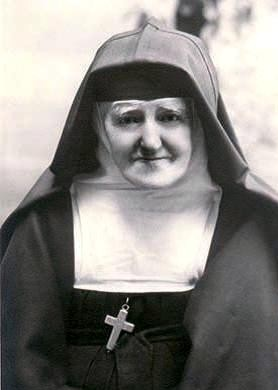

Nun
- Born: Marie Léonie Martin; 3 June 1863; Alençon, Orne, France
- Died: 17 June 1941 (aged 78); Caen, Calvados, France
- Feast: June 16

Léonie Martin, known in religion as Françoise-Thérèse, VHM (3 June 1863 – 17 June 1941), was a French Visitation nun. She was the daughter of Louis and Zélie Martin and an elder sister of Thérèse of Lisieux. She is sometimes dubbed St. Thérèse's "difficult sister".

Her cause for beatification was introduced in the Diocese of Bayeux and Lisieux in 2015, and she was given the posthumous title Servant of God.

== Life ==
Marie Léonie Martin was born in Alençon in the department of Orne in France on 3 June 1863. She was the third child born to Louis and Zélie Martin – both of whom were canonized on 18 October 2015 by Pope Francis. She had several siblings, including Thérèse, who was canonized within Léonie's lifetime. The Martin daughters each bore the first baptismal name "Marie", just as Zélie, her siblings and her nieces did, but only the eldest Martin child commonly used the name.

As a child, Léonie had fragile health; at eighteen months old, she almost died. She suffered from the whooping cough in addition to measles with strong convulsions and eczema. She was a restless child, who was seen as a burden on her mother, who suffered much to care for her – a difficult child. She was so disruptive at the Visitation convent school that she was asked to leave. It was later revealed that Léonie was abused as a child by the family's maid.

Her mother died on 28 August 1877, leaving the fourteen-year-old Léonie with her father and sisters. With his own siblings long since buried and Zélie's sister predeceasing her in February 1877, Louis Martin and his five daughters then moved to Lisieux to be near their remaining close family, (Marie) Isidore Guérin, his wife and daughters. Léonie was a boarding pupil at the school run by the Benedictine nuns of the Abbey of Notre Dame du Pré in Lisieux, where Thérèse later studied.

Louis and Zélie both unsuccessfully pursued monastic lives before their marriage. Zélie had zealously prayed for their children to be consecrated to God. In October 1882, Léonie's older sister, Pauline, entered the Carmelite Monastery at Lisieux. Three of her sisters later followed.

In October 1886, the Martin family visited Alençon so that their oldest daughter, Marie Louise, could see the scenes of her childhood and say goodbye to their friends there before she entered the Carmelite Monastery in Lisieux. While there, Léonie, then 23, unexpectedly entered the monastery of the Poor Clares; however, she found their austere rule too difficult and remained there only six weeks. In the summer of 1887 she entered the Monastery of the Visitation at Caen, but returned to Lisieux only six months later. Soon after that, in April 1888, Thérèse, then 15, entered the Carmelite Monastery at Lisieux.

Léonie and Céline were left at home with their father, whose health was beginning to fail. In February 1889, suffering from hallucinations, he was interned in a psychiatric hospital at Caen. For several months Léonie and Céline moved to Caen to be near him, but as he was allowed only one visit a week and the likelihood of his release diminished, they returned to Lisieux, joining their uncle's family, and made the weekly visits by train. While they were in Caen, Léonie often attended the Monastery of the Visitation. In May 1892, Louis Martin returned to Lisieux, and Léonie and Céline took care of him in a small house on rue Labbey in Lisieux, across the way from their uncle's house. Léonie made her second attempt at joining the Visitation at Caen in 1893, which successfully saw her receive the habit. Her father died the next year, and Céline joined the other three living sisters at the Carmel in Lisieux soon afterward. In the summer of 1895, Léonie left the Visitation on account of her health, returning to Lisieux, where she resided with her uncle Isidore, whose daughter Marie-Louise-Hélène soon joined her cousins at the Carmel. During both of Léonie's stays in the Visitation, she corresponded frequently with her sisters. Of particular interest are her letters with Thérèse, who led Léonie along the "way of confidence and love" she herself was discovering. Thérèse died of tuberculosis in 1897. Her memoir, Story of a Soul, was published in 1898. Reading it gave Léonie new hope for her own religious vocation. She entered the Visitation at Caen definitively on 28 January 1899, and on 2 July 1900 she at last became a professed member of the Visitation Sisters, honoring her sister's memory taking the religious name of "Françoise-Thérèse".

Léonie carried on a fervent correspondence with her sisters at the Lisieux Carmel. Her health continued to falter, and she lived in the shadow of ill health, besieged with ailments such as eczema. She died on 17 June 1941.

== Beatification process ==
On January 24, 2015 her beatification process began in France with the declaration of "nihil obstat" (nothing against), thus conferring upon her the posthumous title of the Servant of God. This began the local diocesan process that gathered documentation and testimonies about Léonie's life and writings; the local process was opened in the chapel of the Visitandine convent at Caen on 2 July 2015. The first, diocesan, phase of the beatification process was closed on 22 February 2020.

Prayers are now being offered for her to be declared "Venerable", the next step on the road to beatification.
