= Carmel of Lisieux =

Carmelite nunnery in Normandy, France

- Carmel de Lisieux
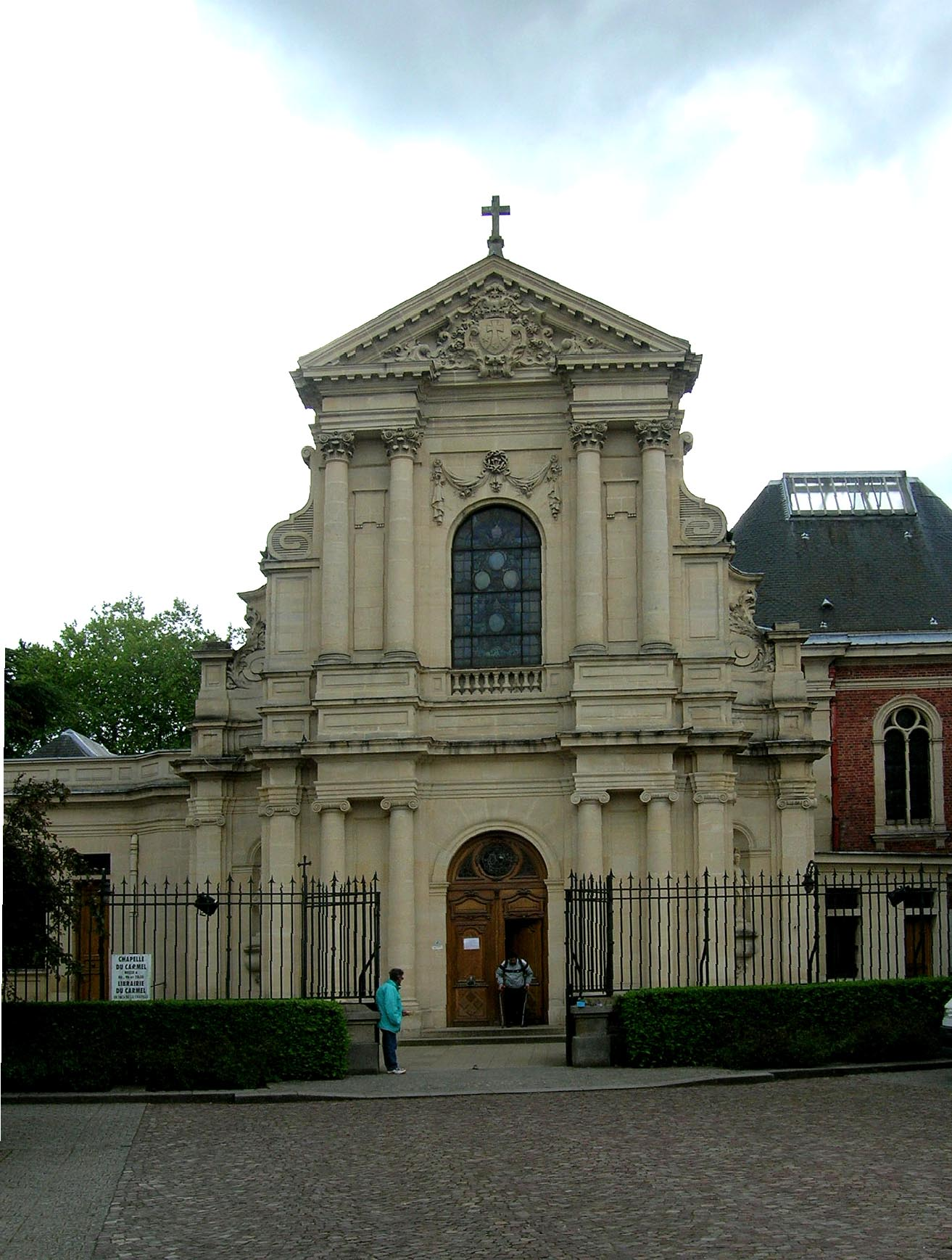
- The convent in 2006
- Interactive map of Carmel of Lisieux

Monastery information
- Dedication: 1838

People
- Founder: Pierre Sauvage

Architecture
- Status: Active
- Country: France

The Carmel of Lisieux is a Carmelite monastery founded in 1838 in the town of Lisieux, France. Saint Thérèse of Lisieux lived in the monastery from 1888 until her death in 1897.

== History ==
The Carmel of Lisieux was founded in 1838 by Father Pierre Sauvage. The first prioress was Mother Geneviève of Saint Therese. One of the early prioresses was Marie-Pauline Martin.

In 1861, the monastery founded a daughter monastery in Ho Chi Minh City.
