= Dietramszell =

Municipality in Bavaria, Germany

- Municipality
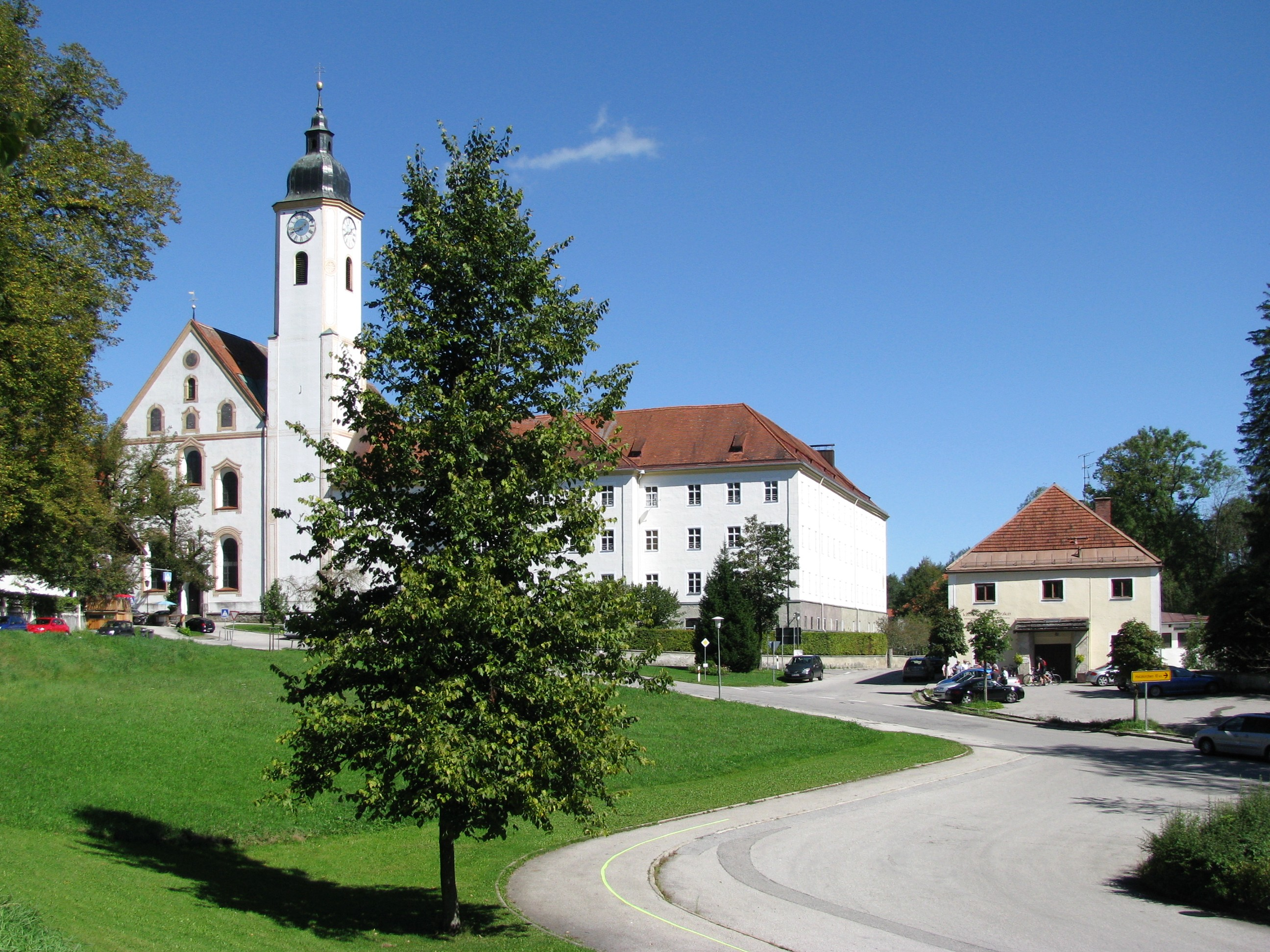
- Dietramszell Monastery

- Coat of arms

- Location of Dietramszell within Bad Tölz-Wolfratshausen district
- Interactive map of Dietramszell
- Location within Germany Location within Bavaria
- Coordinates: 47°51′N 11°36′E
- Country: Germany
- State: Bavaria
- Admin. region: Oberbayern
- District: Bad Tölz-Wolfratshausen

Government
  - Mayor (2020–26): Josef Hauser

Area
  - Total: 96.78 km^{2} (37.37 sq mi)
- Elevation: 685 m (2,247 ft)

Population (2025-12-31)
  - Total: 5,620
  - Density: 58.1/km^{2} (150/sq mi)
- Time zone: UTC+01:00 (CET)
  - Summer (DST): UTC+02:00 (CEST)
- Postal codes: 83623
- Dialling codes: 08027 (08171, 08176)
- Vehicle registration: TÖL
- Website: www.dietramszell.de

Dietramszell is a municipality in the district of Bad Tölz-Wolfratshausen in Bavaria, Germany. The community of 5,282 (2005) residents sits 685 meters above sea level.

The idyllic community became internationally known after the "torture prince affair" and subsequently for its hesitation to strip Paul von Hindenburg and Adolf Hitler of their honorary citizenships.
