= List of places named after Saint Thérèse of Lisieux =

Places named after Saint Thérèse of Lisieux include:

== Argentina ==
- Santa Teresita, municipality in Buenos Aires Province

== Australia ==
The tiny remote Aboriginal community Santa Teresa in the Central Desert was named after Saint Therese of Lisieux. There is a Catholic church in the town also of her namesake.

== Belize ==
- Santa Teresita, village in Cayo District

== Bermuda ==
- The Cathedral of Saint Theresa of Lisieux, a Roman Catholic cathedral of the Diocese of Hamilton in Bermuda.

== Brazil ==
- Santa Terezinha, municipality in Bahia
- Santa Terezinha, Mato Grosso, municipality in Mato Grosso
- Santa Terezinha, municipality in Pernambuco
- Santa Terezinha, municipality in Santa Catarina
- Santa Terezinha do Progresso, municipality in Santa Catarina
- Santa Terezinha do Tocantins, municipality in Tocantins
- Santa Terezinha de Goiás, municipality in Goiás
- Santa Terezinha de Itaipu, municipality in Paraná
- Santa Teresinha, municipality in Paraíba
- Paróquia Santa Teresinha in São Paulo
- St. Therese Cathedral in Bacabal, Maranhão

== Canada ==
A school, St. Theresa Shrine, opened in 1945 in Toronto is named in her honour.

- The municipality of Sainte-Thérèse-de-la-Gatineau, Quebec, is named in her honour. There is a neighborhood in Québec City, Québec named after her. There is a community in northeastern Manitoba, named St. Theresa Point, Manitoba. Nearby, there is also a North American Native band named St. Theresa Point First Nation. They are situated on the southwest shore of Island Lake.
- There is a Thérèse-Martin School in Joliette, Quebec. In Ontario, there is a St. Theresa of Lisieux Catholic High School in Richmond Hill, a St. Theresa's High School in Midland and a St. Theresa's School in Sault Ste. Marie. There is a Little Flower Academy in Vancouver, British Columbia.
- The Society of the Little Flower and Shrine to St Thérèse is in Niagara Falls, Ont. There is St. Therese of Lisieux Catholic School, Hamilton, Ont.
- A school in Toronto, Ontario, St. Theresa Shrine
- Theresetta Catholic School in Castor, Alberta
- St. Theresa's Catholic Church in Halifax, Nova Scotia
- A catholic elementary school in Saskatoon, Saskatchewan

== Egypt ==
- Basilica of St Therese of the Child Jesus, Cairo
- La Rose de Lisieux School, Cairo

== Hong Kong ==
- St. Teresa's Church
- St. Teresa Secondary School
- The Little Flower's Catholic Primary School

== India ==
St Therese of child jesus's first church in the world is in kandanvillai, kanyakumari, Tamil Nadu. where the church bell hung is gifted by st therese's elder sister.

- Little Flower Latin Catholic Church, Pottakuzhy, Ernakulam, Ernakulam Dt, India. Asia's first church built on honour of St. Therese of Lisieux
- Mar Augustine Memorial Lisie Hospital, Ernakulam
- Little Flower Hospital, Angamaly, Ernakulum
- Little Flower convent Higher secondary school, Koratty, Thrissur
- Little Flower church, Kumbidy, Thrissur
- St. Theresa's Convent Sr. Sec. School, Karnal (HR), India
- St. Theresa of Lisieux Catholic Church, Vellayambalam, Trivandrum, India
- St. Therese of Infant Jesus Catholic Church, Kandanvilai, Kanyakumari Dt, India. It is blessed on April 7, 1924.
- Little Flower Girls High School Vadakara, Koothattukulam, Kerala, India
- Little Flower Church, Madappally, Changanasserry, Kottayam Dt, Kerala, India
- Lisieux Matriculation Higher Secondary School, Coimbatore, Tamil Nadu, India
- St. Theresa Church, Crawford, Trichy, Tamil Nadu, India. Built during 1934.
- Little Flower Girls Hr Sec School, Crawford. Managed by Sisters of St Annes, Trichy; Trichy, Tamil Nadu, India.
- St. Theresa's Boys High School, Bandra, Mumbai, India. http://theresianboyz.org
- Little Flower High School, Hyderabad, Telangana, India

== Ireland ==
- St. Thérèse of Lisieux Oratory and St. Thérèse of Lisieux Primary School, in north Belfast.

== Lebanon ==
- Chapel of Saint Therese on Mount of Mercy in Ghosta, Lebanon
- Chapel of Saint Therese in Amsheet
- Convent of St. Therese in Keserwan District
- Saint Thérèse Church in Ain Aar
- Saint Thérèse Church in Amsheet
- Saint Thérèse Church in Baabda
- Saint Thérèse Church in Beit Kassab
- Paroisse Sainte Thérèse in Beit Mery
- Saint Thérèse Church in Hadath, Mount Lebanon
- Saint Thérèse Church in Forn El Chebbak
- Saint Thérèse Church in Qartaba
- Saint Thérèse Church in Qleiat
- Saint Thérèse Church in Zahlé

== The Netherlands ==
- Theresialyceum, secondary school in Tilburg, the Netherlands, was founded on October 3, 1926, by the Sisters of Charity of Our Lady Mother of Mercy.

== Philippines ==
- Shrine of St. Therese, Doctor of the Church, in Villamor Air Base (Nichols), Pasay, Philippines. Completed in 1983 as a chapel and reconstructed in 2005 and completed in 2007 during which it was declared as a diocesan shrine of the Military Ordinariate of the Philippines.
- The Saint Therese of the Child Jesus Parish Church inside the University of the Philippines Los Baños campus under the Roman Catholic Diocese of San Pablo.
- The municipality of Santa Teresita, Batangas was named in her honor.
- St. Theresita's Academy, a Catholic secondary school in Silay City, Negros Occidental, is named after the saint.
- St. Therese of the Child Jesus Parish - Dagupan City

== Poland ==
- Parish of Therese of the Child Jesus, Gdańsk

== Singapore ==
- Church of St Teresa

== Turkey ==
- St. Teresa's Catholic Church in Ulus, Ankara

== United Kingdom ==
- Parish of St. Thérèse of Lisieux, Roman Catholic Diocese of Middlesbrough, Ingleby Barwick, Stockton-on-Tees, England.
- St. Thérèse of Lisieux R.C. Primary School, Ingleby Barwick, Stockton-on-Tees, England.
- St. Thérèse R.C. Primary School, Heaton, England
- Parish of the Sacred Heart and St. Teresa in Coleshill, Birmingham.
- St Theresa of Lisieux R.C. Church, Northiam, East Sussex
- St Theresa of the Child Jesus R.C. Church, Princes Risborough, Buckinghamshire
- St Theresa of Lisieux R.C. Church, Southwick, West Sussex
- St Theresa of Lisieux R.C. Church, Charlbury, Oxfordshire

== United States ==
- In 1917, St Therese Catholic Church was founded in Sioux Falls, SD as the second parish in the city. Msgr. John Cavanagh, pastor of the parish for over 40 years, named the parish after his favorite Saint, Therese of Lisieux, the Little Flower of Jesus.
- In 1919, the Shrine of St. Thérèse was founded in Fresno, California.
- In 1921, the Bishop of Oklahoma City, Oklahoma, authorized the establishment of The Church of Our Lady of Mount Carmel and St. Therese, known locally as Little Flower Catholic Church, to serve the city's growing Mexican community south of the North Canadian River in Oklahoma City.
- Beginning in the 1920s, the National Shrine of St. Therese was housed at St. Clara's Carmelite Church in the south side of Chicago (destroyed by fire in 1975, relocated at Darien, Illinois).
- On August 23, 1923, the Shrine of the Little Flower and St. Theresa of the Child Jesus Parish in Nasonville, Rhode Island, was founded as the first shrine and parish named in honor of St. Therese in the world just four months after she was beatified.
- On December 25, 1924, the Irish Province of the Discalced Carmelite Friars officially founded St. Therese Church in Alhambra, California, and dedicated it to Blessed Therese of the Child Jesus.
- On March 13, 1925, St. Therese of the Infant Jesus in Indianapolis was established. The parish has both a church and a school, commonly referred to as Little Flower.
- In May 1925, St. Therese of the Child Jesus in Philadelphia was established and named in honor of Saint Therese.
- In June 1925, St. Thérèse of Lisieux Catholic Church in Cresskill, New Jersey, was established.
- In 1925, Little Flower Parish, Church and School was founded in Richmond Heights, Missouri. This is the same year that St. Therese of Lisieux was canonized.
- In 1926, the National Shrine of the Little Flower in Royal Oak, Michigan, was built in honor of Thérèse of Lisieux.
- In 1926, Church of the Little Flower was established in Coral Gables, Florida.
- In 1926, The Church of Saint Teresa of the Infant Jesus was established in the Castleton Corners area of Staten Island, New York.
- In 1926, St Therese of Lisieux Roman Catholic Church was established in Brooklyn, New York.
- In 1926, St. Therese Little Flower Parish in Cincinnati, Ohio, began in a blacksmith shop converted into a chapel at the corner of North Bend Road and Colerain Avenue. Soon after, plans were drawn for the original church and school. Archbishop John T. McNicholas granted permission to start construction in July 1928. The church and school were completed in March 1929.
- In 1927 named after St. Therese of Lisieux, St. Therese Parish of Southgate, Kentucky, is a member of the Roman Catholic Diocese of Covington, Kentucky and is designated the Diocesan Shrine of The Little Flower.
- In 1927, St. Thérèse de Lisieux Church and Parish was founded by Italian immigrants. It is the largest Catholic church in Uniontown, Pennsylvania.
- In 1928, St. Theresa of the Infant Jesus parish established in New Cumberland, Pennsylvania by Monsignor Roy C. Keffer and dedicated by Bishop Philip R. McDevitt.
- In 1929, Little Flower Mission (Later Little Flower Parish) in Middlebranch, Ohio. A permanent Church was later built and dedicated in 1977, and a preschool was started in 1974.
- In 1930, St. Therese the Little Flower Catholic Church was established. It was the 12th parish of Memphis.
- In 1930, Little Flower Elementary School was opened in Memphis, Tennessee, by the Sisters of Charity of Nazareth. The school currently operates as one of the diocesan Jubilee Schools.
- In 1931, the Basilica of the National Shrine of the Little Flower, located in San Antonio, Texas, was established.
- In 1931, the Parish of Saint Theresa of the Child Jesus was established in Honolulu, Hawaii. It was later elevated to a co-cathedral.
- In 1934, Father Jimmy Byrnes opened Little Flower Catholic School in Mobile, Alabama.
- In 1939, Cardinal Dougherty built a high school in Philadelphia, Pennsylvania, in honor of St. Thérèse: Little Flower Catholic High School for Girls.
- In 1945, Bishop (later archbishop) Thomas Joseph Toolen of the Diocese of Mobile (later Archdiocese of Mobile-Birmingham) erected Little Flower Catholic Church and School in the community of Myrtle Grove outside Pensacola, Florida, in honor of St. Therese.
- In 1946, the St. Therese of Deephaven Catholic Church was founded on the east side of Lake Minnetonka in Minnesota. The parish opened the St. Therese Catholic School in 1959.
- In 1947 on April 25th, The Parish of St. Therese of the Infant Jesus was founded in Albuquerque, New Mexico.
  - St. Therese Catholic School began classes on September 15 of that year.
- In 1948 Saint Therese of the Little Flower Catholic Church was founded in Reno, Nevada.
  - In 1962 the Little Flower School elementary school was established in Reno, Nevada.
- In 1948, a Little Flower parish was established in Bethesda, Maryland, with the Reverend Edward J. O'Brien as its first pastor.
- In 1952, St. Theresa of the Child Jesus was built in Leeds, Alabama, with the first Mass offered on July 27 by Fr. James Gallagher; the church was later dedicated by Bishop Toolen on February 15, 1953.
- In 1971, the parish of Saint Theresa of the Child Jesus was established in Carlyss, Louisiana.
- In 1987, the Nation Shrine Museum of St. Therese building was dedicated at Darien, Illinois.
- In 2000, the parish of St. Therese de Lisieux was established in Wellington, Florida.
- In San Diego, California, St. Thérèse of the Child Jesus is an established church and elementary school.
- In Beulaville, North Carolina, is a small Spanish speaking mission church named Santa Teresa del Niño Jesús Catholic Mission
- There is a Shrine of St. Therese of Lisieux in the New Columbus section of Nesquehoning, Pennsylvania. It was established in 2010 and officially made a diocesan shrine by the Allentown, PA diocese in 2012. Every year on the first Sunday of October a Shower of Roses celebration is held here in honor of St. Therese, the Little Flower.

== Gallery ==
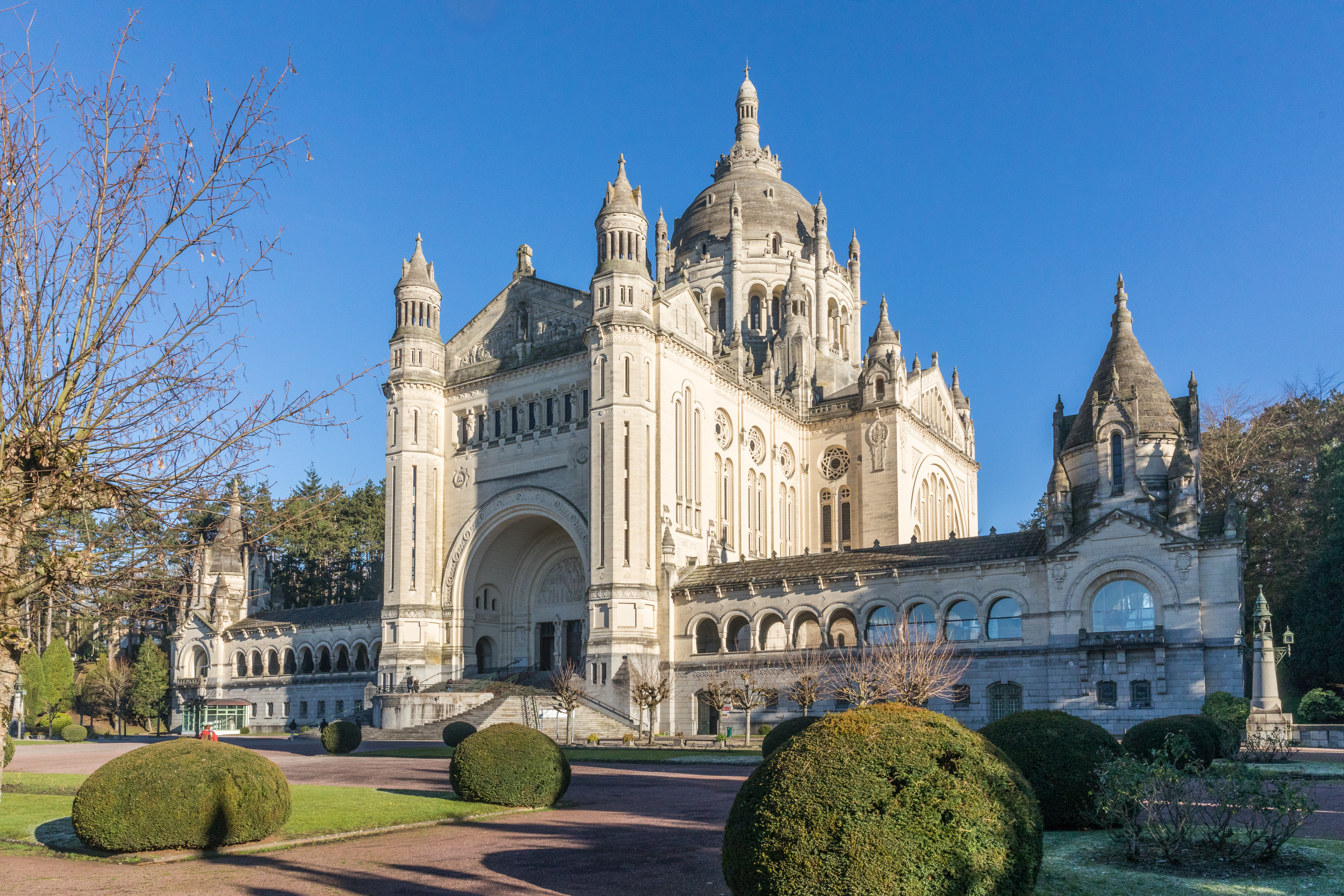
Basilica of St. Thérèse in Lisieux

St. Theresa Church, Vellayambalam, India

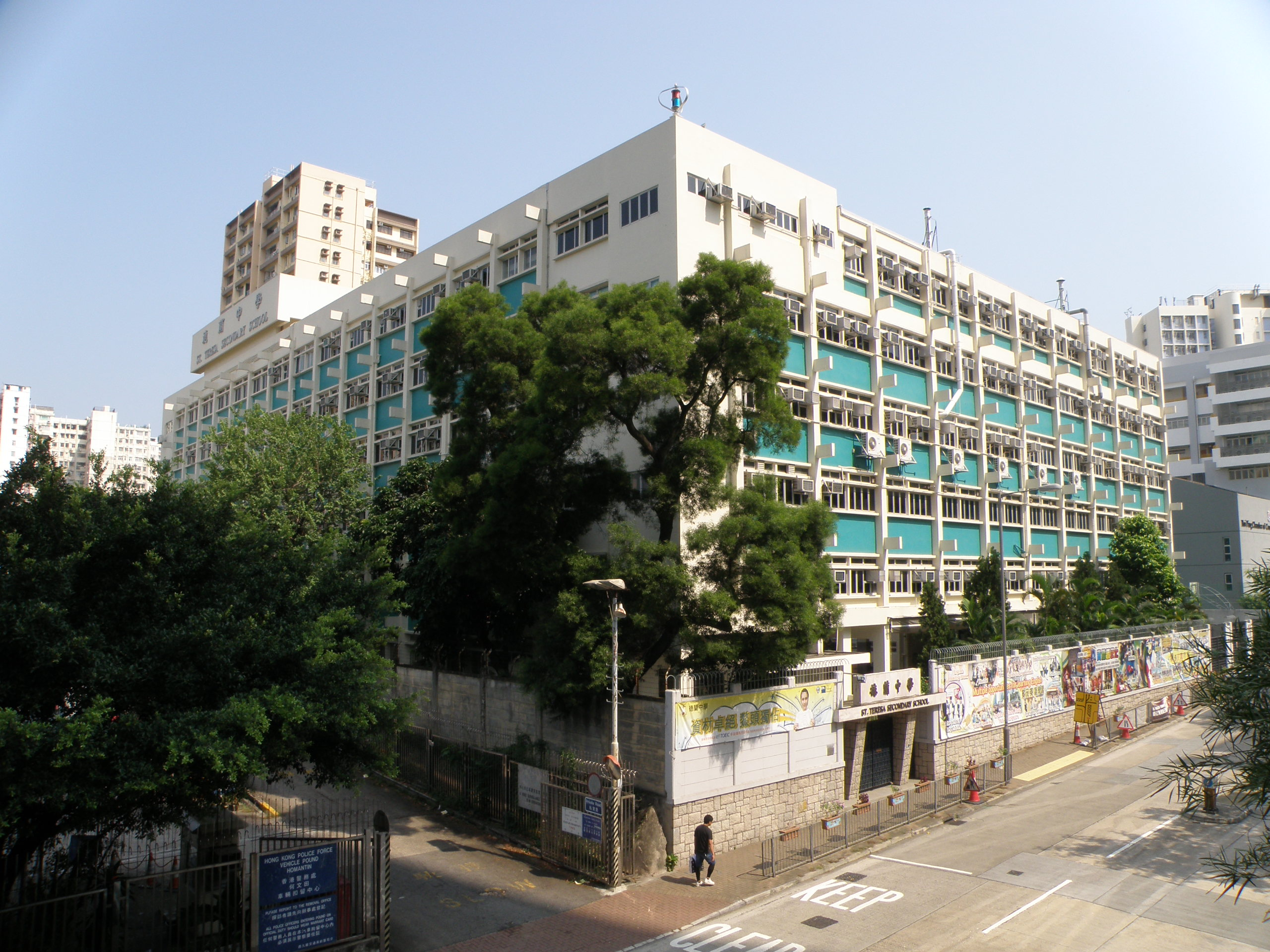
St. Teresa Secondary School, Hong Kong

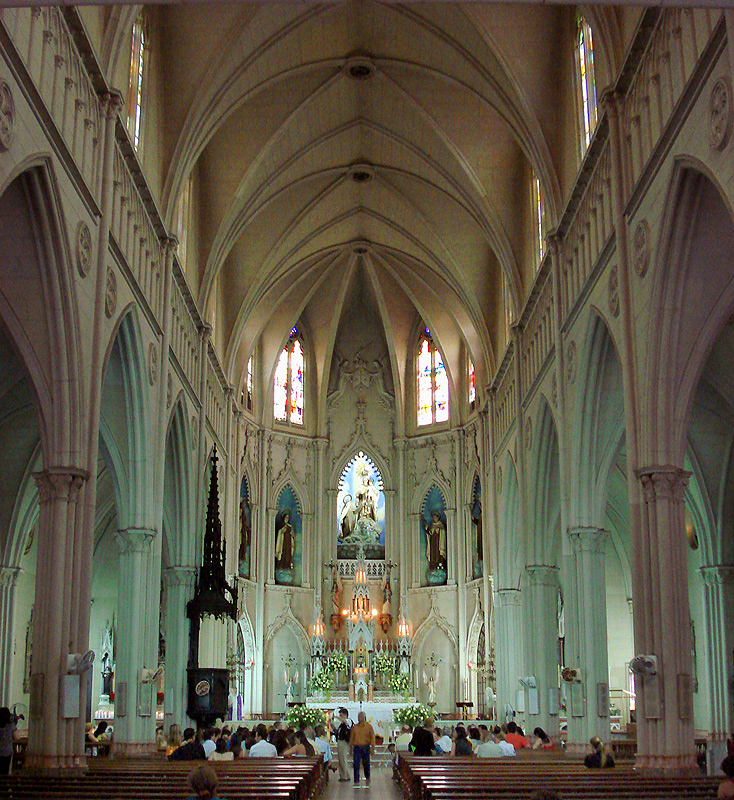
Igreja de Santa Teresinha, Porto Alegre, Brazil

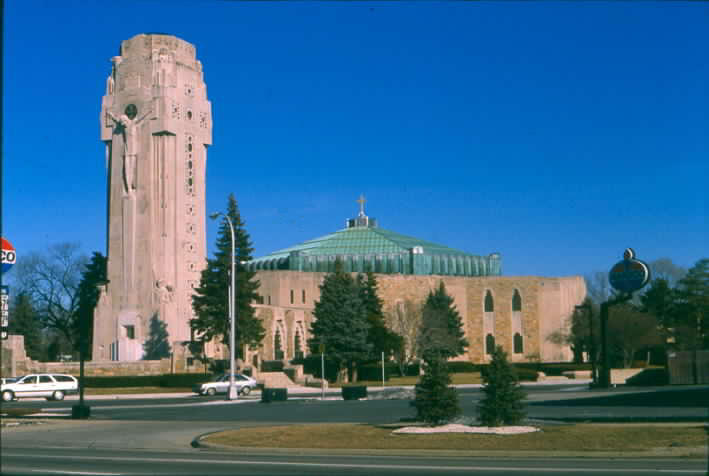
National Shrine of the Little Flower

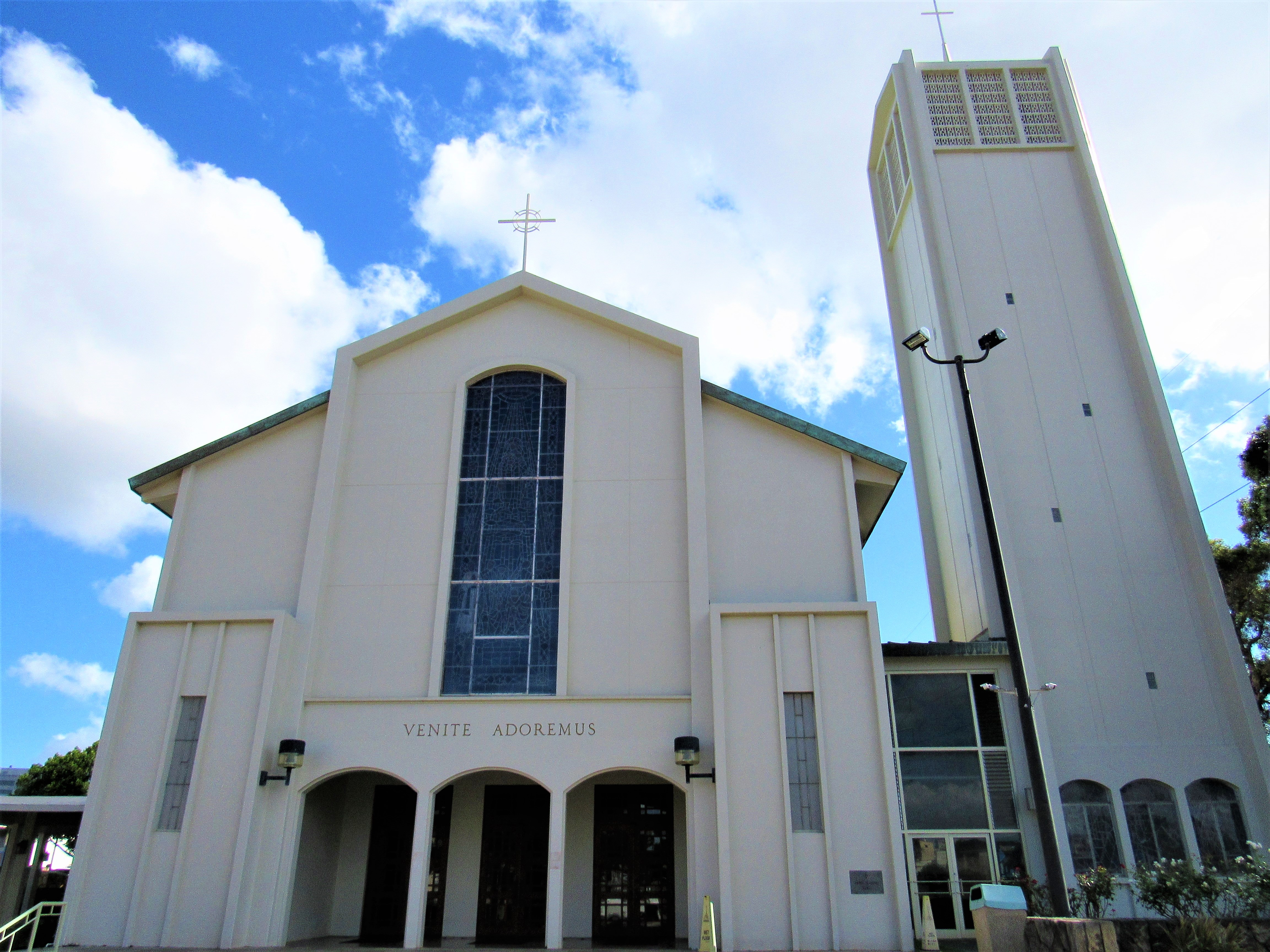
Co-Cathedral of Saint Theresa of the Child Jesus, Honolulu, Hawaii

== See also ==
- Church of St. Thérèse of Lisieux (disambiguation)
- Saint Therese (disambiguation)
