= Santa Teresinha =

Santa Teresinha, also spelled Santa Terezinha, is a Portuguese language term for saints named Teresa and may refer to:

== Places ==
- Santa Teresinha, Bahia
- Santa Teresinha, Paraíba
- Santa Terezinha, Mato Grosso
- Santa Terezinha, Pernambuco
- Santa Terezinha, Santa Catarina
- Santa Terezinha de Goiás
- Santa Terezinha de Itaipu
- Santa Terezinha do Progresso
- Santa Terezinha do Tocantins

== Other uses ==
- St. Therese Cathedral in Bacabal, Maranhão
- Paróquia Santa Teresinha, a church in São Paulo

== See also ==
- Teresinha
