= Co-Cathedral of Saint Theresa of the Child Jesus (Honolulu) =

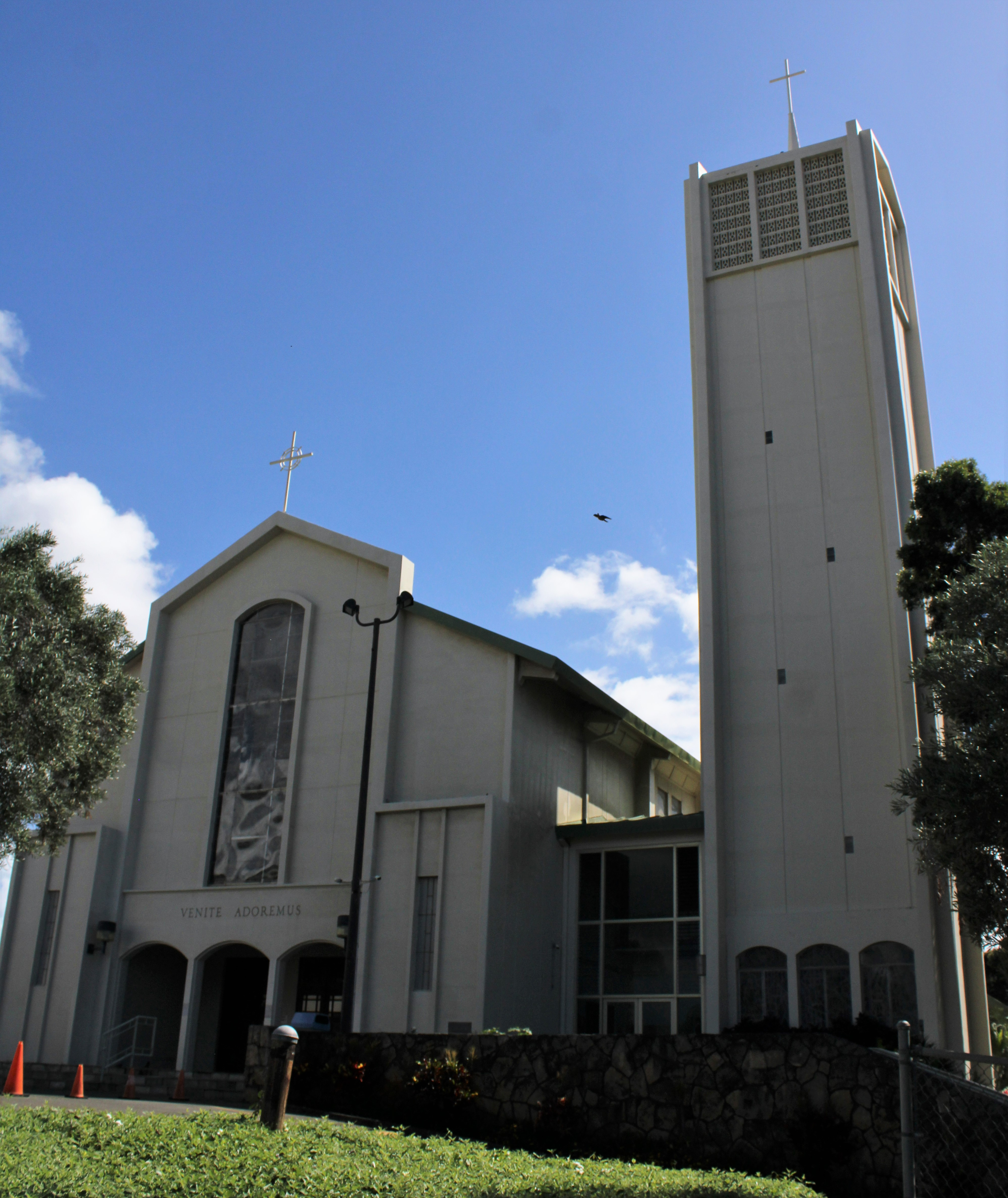

- Location in Hawaii
- 21°19′27″N 157°51′40″W
- Location: 712 N. School St. Honolulu, Hawaii
- Country: United States
- Denomination: Roman Catholic Church
- Website: www.cocathedral.org

History
- Founded: 1931

Architecture
- Style: Modern
- Completed: 1963

Administration
- Diocese: Honolulu

Clergy
- Bishop: Most Rev. Michael T. Castori
- Rector: Rev. Manuel Hewe

The Co-Cathedral of Saint Theresa of the Child Jesus is a co-cathedral of the Roman Catholic Church and its Diocese of Honolulu, located in Kalihi-Palama in the outskirts of downtown Honolulu, Hawaii. The principal cathedral of the diocese remains the Cathedral Basilica of Our Lady of Peace. It was named in honor of the Saint Theresa of the Child Jesus.

The original church was established in 1931 by Msgr. Stephen Alencastre, Vicar Apostolic of the Hawaiian Islands. Construction was completed only a year later, in September 1932. Reflecting the growth of Catholicism in the immediate community, then pastor and diocesan vicar general Msgr. Benedict Vierra led a major fundraising effort to replace the church's wooden structure, showing signs of deterioration in 1956. Vierra's efforts were successful and the renovated church was dedicated on August 15, 1963.

Having found a need to have a larger space for pontifical liturgies - since the Cathedral Basilica of Our Lady of Peace had become too small to accommodate the increased population since the vicariate apostolic was elevated to a diocese - Bishop Joseph Ferrario petitioned Pope John Paul II in 1984 to elevate Saint Theresa church to the dignity of a co-cathedral, as it is larger in physical size. A papal decree elevating Saint Theresa Catholic Church to co-cathedral was issued and the church was consecrated on July 28, 1985. Its interior was reconfigured and a second cathedra for the bishop was placed in the church.

The Co-Cathedral of Saint Theresa of the Child Jesus is most often used for pontifical liturgies such as the annual Mass of the Chrism during which the holy oils (oil of the sick, oil of catechumens, and the holy Chrism) used in several of the sacraments are consecrated by the bishop before being distributed to the parishes of the diocese. Ordinations and episcopal installations are sometimes celebrated at the co-cathedral.

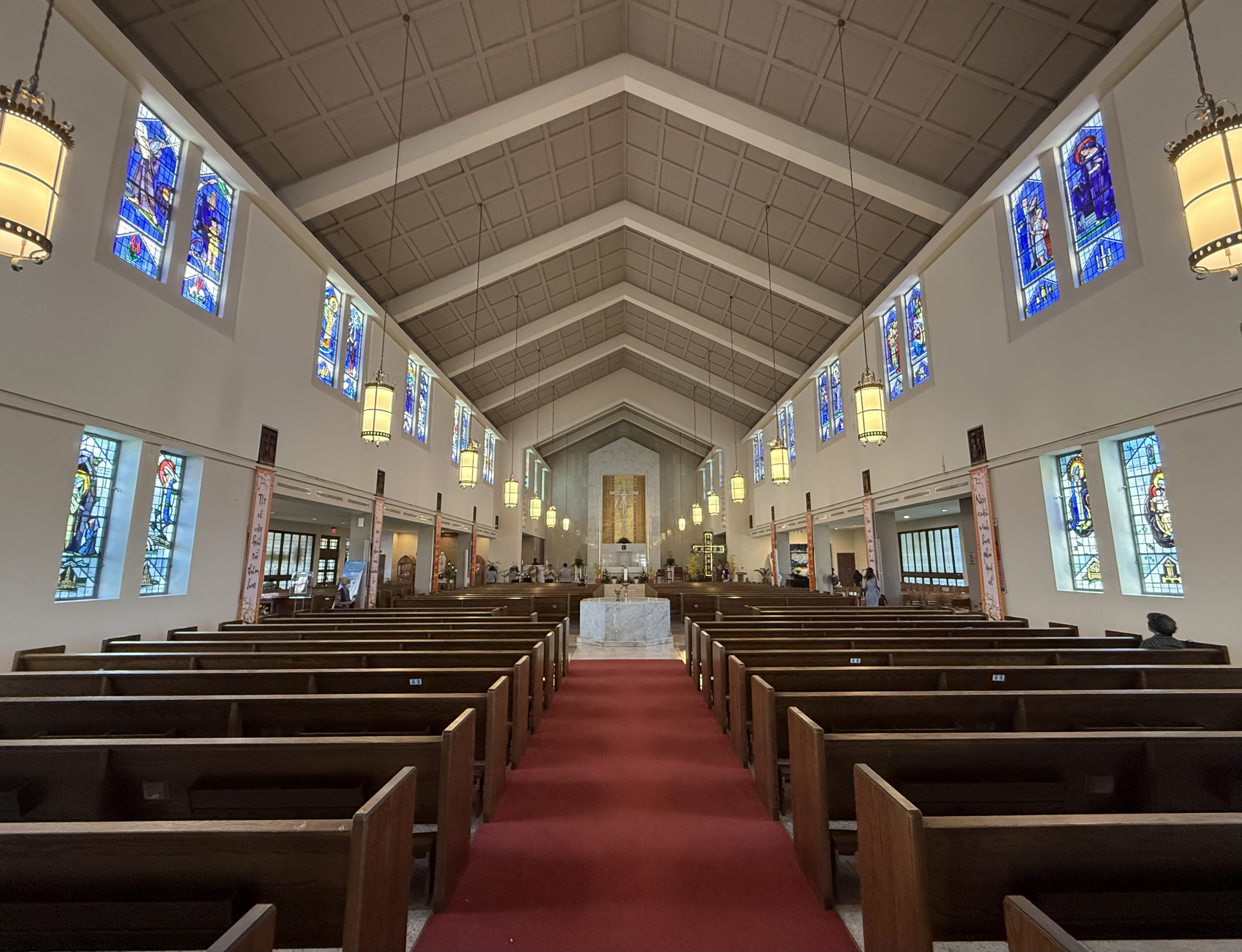
View up the nave

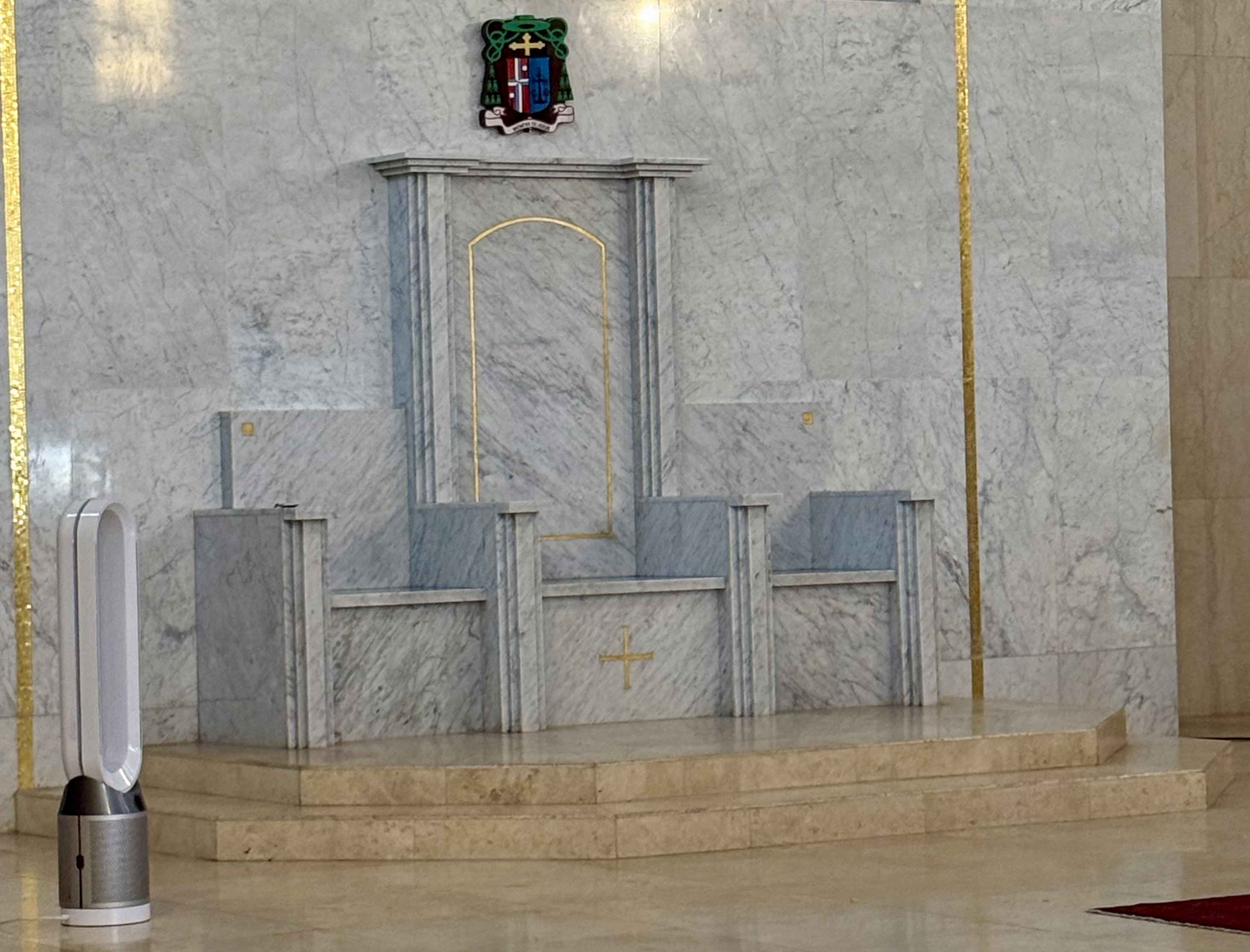
Cathedra

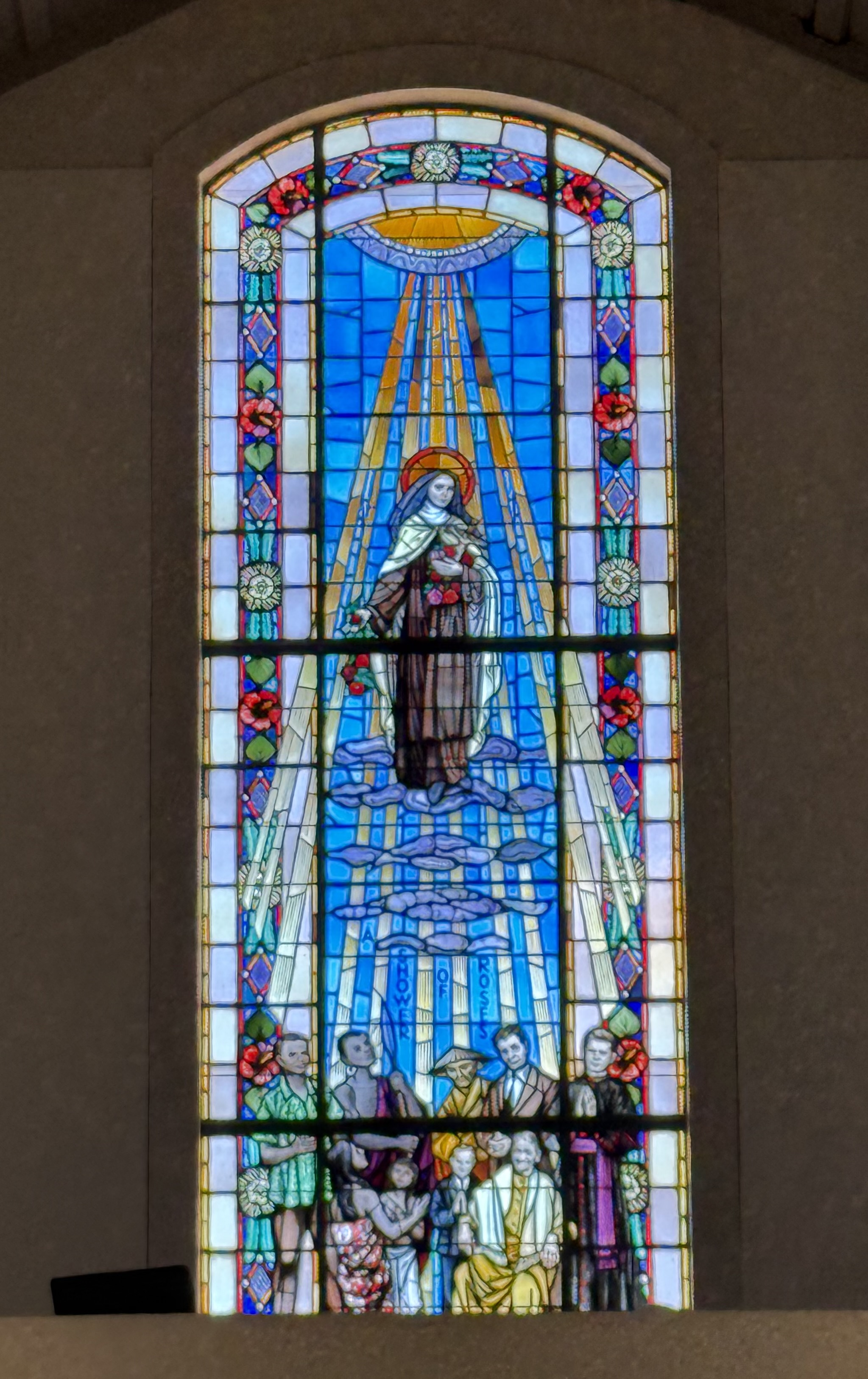
Window in gallery

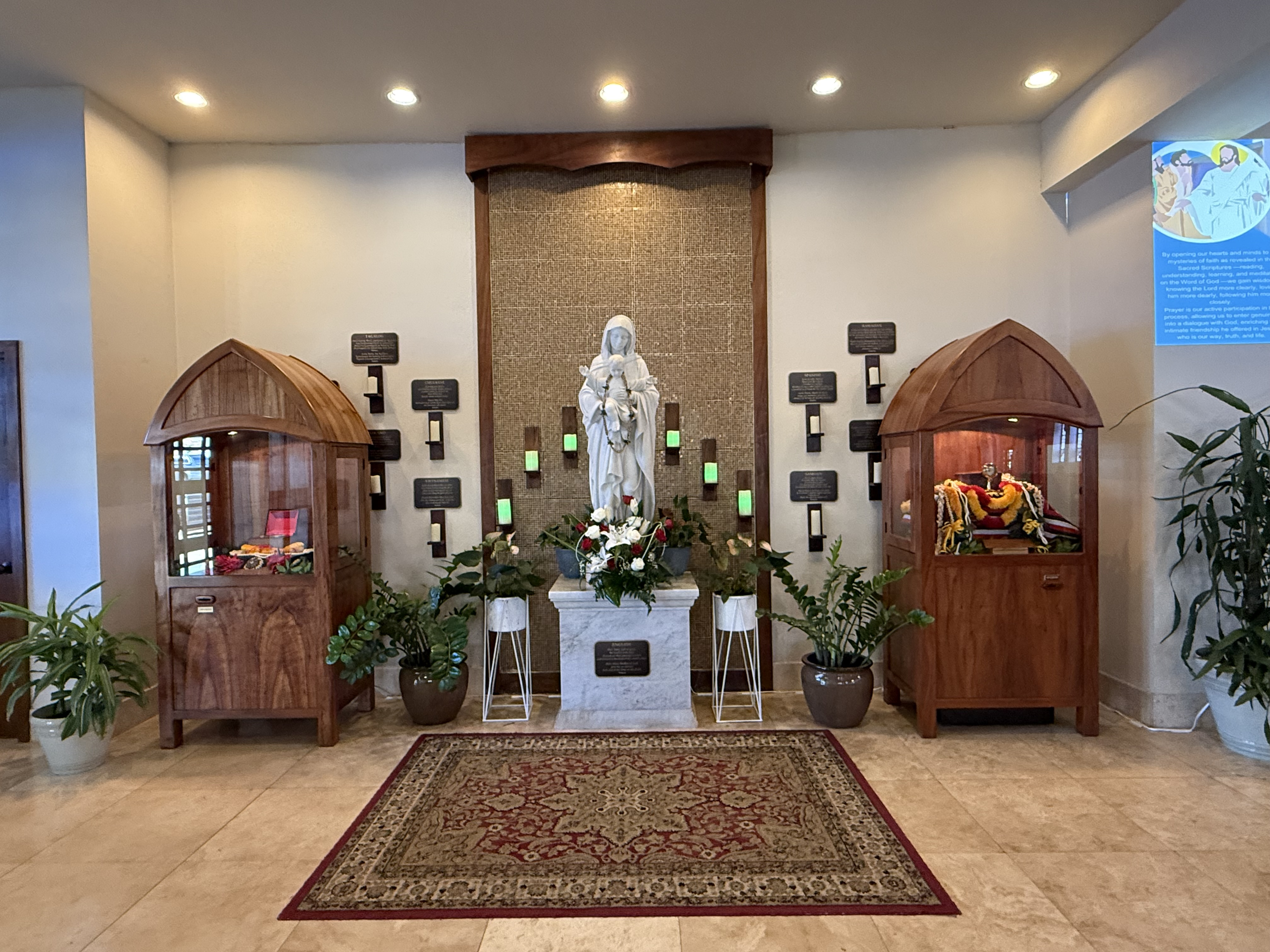
Shrine

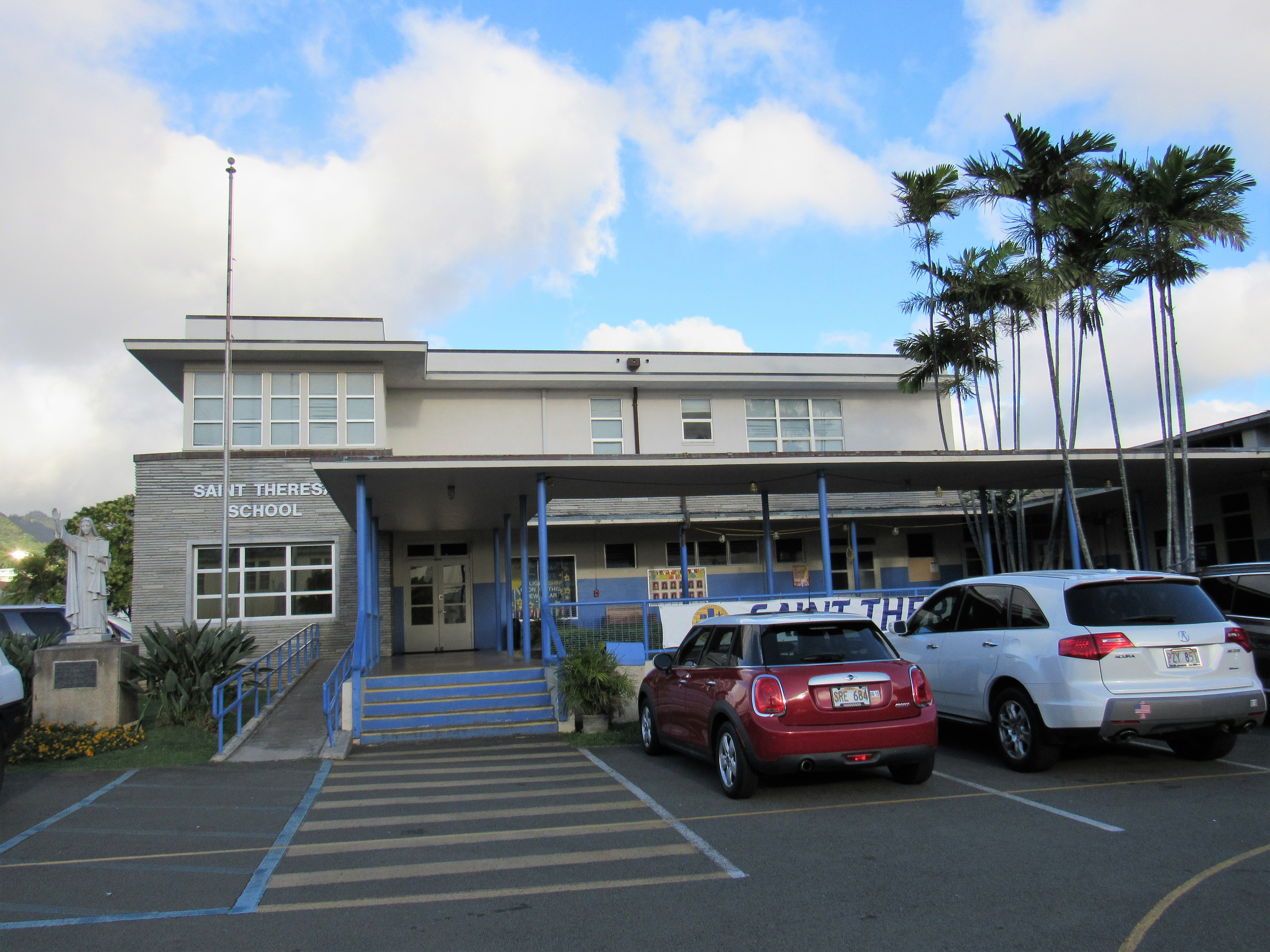
School

== See also ==
- List of Catholic cathedrals in the United States
- List of cathedrals in the United States
- Thérèse de Lisieux
- List of places named after St. Thérèse of Lisieux
