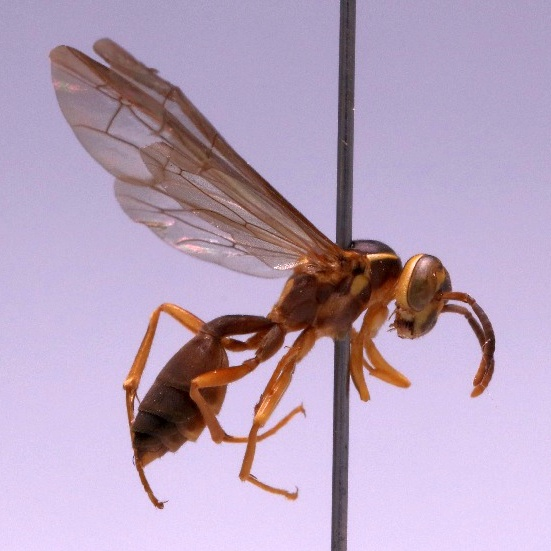

Scientific classification
- Kingdom: Animalia
- Phylum: Arthropoda
- Clade: Pancrustacea
- Class: Insecta
- Order: Hymenoptera
- Family: Vespidae
- Genus: Angiopolybia
- Species: A. pallens

Binomial name
- Angiopolybia pallens (Lepeletier, 1836)

= Angiopolybia pallens =

Species of wasp

Angiopolybia pallens is a species of social wasp predominantly found in South America. The wasp is generally seen in Brazilian rainforests. This species was discovered by Lepeletier in 1836. It typically feeds on nectar and carrion. In fact much of its feeding behavior and impact on humans is centered on feeding on animal carcasses. The wasp species displays a caste differentiation that can be seen by difference in ovarian development. Additionally they have a unique colony establishment procedure. It begins with a few individuals from the nest leaving to find a good site and then the rest of the colony follows using specific communication signals that are further discussed in this article.

== Taxonomy and phylogeny ==
The tropical social wasp genus Angiopolybia contains four different species. The wasp is within the tribe Epiponini and is a basal swarm-founding wasp. A swarm founding wasp is a wasp that finds its nest by sending out a group of wasps going out to find a new nest site. It is considered a eusocial wasp. Most social wasps have the unique characteristics of a caste system in which the queen wasp is the primary producer of offspring. This characteristic of a caste system is evident in the behavior of A. pallens. Lepeletier originally discovered the species in 1836. He classified the wasps under a different genus Rhopalidia and when he discovered the wasps he also found another species under the name of R. rufithorax. The species was later transferred to the genus Angiopolybia that shared with A. paranesis, A. obidensis, and A. zischkai. These species are widespread in the Amazon and extend from Costa Rica to Bolivia.

== Description and identification ==
Angiopolybia pallens are distinguished by the ombre-like progression from yellow to black on their bodies. They have four legs that progress from a lighter yellow to a dark orange. The wasp's body is skinny with the back coming to a point. Their wings are slim and black. The slim wings cause A. pallens to fly low and for short distances. This means that their foraging area is limited to about 1,800 square meters. The workers, queens and intermediates of the colony are almost indistinguishable with the queens only occasionally being larger in size.

The nest of A. pallens is generally in a funnel shape with a downward facing entrance. The nest is usually attached to a leaf by a central pedicle. In general the nest is strategically placed at a diagonal in order to provide more coverage from a leaf. The nest is usually made from a mixture of salivary secretions and vegetal fibers. All social wasps use plant fiber as the primary material in the construction of their nests.

== Distribution and habitat ==
Angiopolybia pallens is predominantly found in Brazil. They are among the most common species of wasps in this area by an overwhelming amount, as seen in multiple feeding behavior studies. The wasps prefer more humid environments and are more active when humidity levels are higher. However, the wasps are generally more active during the cooler parts of the day, like the early morning or around dusk. The nests of these wasps are typically found in rainforest environments in clearings or on the edge of the forest. A. pallens typically have nests that are large and easy to see hanging off of the branch of a tree. This means that their nests are subject to predation by ants and other animals. In order to compensate for the size and easy sighting the nests are protected from any ant predation by arboreal ants with which they share the tree.

== Colony cycle ==
The colony cycle begins with the pre-emergence phase where the queen and a few adult workers establish a new nest. The queen already has been fertilized and is able to produce a few workers in the beginning in order to best assist with the building of the nest. The swarm starting the nest is mostly made up of adults that are already mature before the next nesting cycle begins. Then once the nesting cycle begins, the larvae and eggs are laid. Next is the worker production phase where they have the majority of eggs, larvae and pupae. This phase introduces the highest amount of reproduction and the intermediates are produced during this time. Once the nest and colony has reached maturity, the male production phase begins and the males eventually fertilize an intermediate. This fertilization distinguishes the intermediates from the queens and the colony cycle is repeated. The wasps are most active from months of July–December.

== Foraging behavior ==
Angiopolybia pallens has exhibited a unique feeding pattern compared to most social wasps in a variety of ways. They are more active in the daytime compared to many other wasp species. These wasps tend to be most active at collecting nectar between 7 and 8 am, collecting prey between 10 and 11 am and collecting pulp for nest building generally happens before foraging. In general, other wasp species were found to start their activity later in the day and end earlier. A. pallens are usually the initial wasps present at the site of an animal carcass trap set by Silveira in an experiment conducted to study the wasps feeding patterns. The wasps also tend to collect nectar, prey and pulp in almost equal percentages. Other social wasps tend to focus on the collection of glucidic kinds of foods. This behavior still perplexes scientists.

=== Carrion Feeding ===
Angiopolybia pallens have shown high prevalence of carrion feeding in Brazil. When compared to six other species of wasps, they made up 43.5% of the wasps that approached a carcass. The wasps do not transport pieces of flesh to the nest but instead consume at the feeding site, and the eaten food is subsequently regurgitated to other workers in the nest. The wasps also are more likely to consume carrion from July to December, which are the drier months of the year. It has been claimed that this wasp is the most important carrion consuming wasp in South America. An additional behavior that A. pallens exhibit is the interaction with other wasps and ants when feeding on carcasses. A. pallens are typically the first wasps to rush an animal carcass but are typically displaced when another bigger wasp species approaches the carcass. However, the wasps will hover over ants occasionally darting downwards toward them causing the ants to flee. The wasps will then land on that particular area of the carcass and feed. They continue to intimidate the ants preventing the encroachment on their space by raising their wings and darting towards the ants. In this way the wasps are successful at obtaining food from carcasses even in the presence of ants.

== Swarming behavior ==
Swarming is often a method used by wasps to travel from one nest site to find a new nest site. This type of behavior is shown by A. pallens and displays the importance of communication within the wasp colony. The wasps will divide themselves into two different swarms when beginning the process of finding a new nest site. The first swarm consists of queens and workers and this group leaves the nest site to find a new site to establish a colony. They leave the site because of “cyclic intracolony factors”, meaning it is time to move on and establish a new colony. The second swarm includes the rest of the adult population and happens upon the destruction of the previous nest. The queen is the founder of a colony as she is needed to produce new workers and intermediates to help fully establish the nest.

=== Communication ===
Once they have found a new nest site, A. pallens convey this information to other workers and intermediates through glandular secretions from their antennae. They make upward runs of several centimeters long on vertical surfaces providing a road map of sorts for the adult wasps to follow. The front body of the wasp will angle slightly upward while the antennae works its way upwardly to maintain the connection with the surface. The wings perk up as they make this connection. Typically A. pallens begins to use this trail about 3 hours after the swarm formation. This means that generally the new site is already being developed. In fact the dragging behavior seen to deposit the glandular secretion by the wasp is seen only after the deposition of building material at the new nest site.

=== Ants and nest selection ===
The two primary causes of nest mortality for A. pallens and other social wasps is predation and inclement weather. Therefore, the wasps attempt to find a location that will both protect them from bad weather as well as bar any access for predators. Army ants present one of the largest threats as predators for A. pallens nest sites and are considered to be one of the driving forces in the evolution of their nest architecture. A. pallens have been found to build their nests near arboreal ants in order to help protect against the army ants. However, this does not mean that the wasps avoid predation all together. An evolutionary response to this chance of attack is the ability of the adult population to escape, move the colony, and replace the nest.

== Queen intermediate conflict ==
The wasps in A. pallens colonies can be broken up into three groups: queens, intermediates, and workers. These groups are distinguished by whether they are mated or virgin, and whether they have developed or undeveloped ovaries. As discussed earlier on, there is little variance in the size of the wasps depending on their caste placement. This implies that A. pallens establishes the queen wasps during adulthood rather than during development. In other words, the post conception determination is by the conflict between individuals in the colony and not by their feeding during larval development. This means that there is a high amount of competition always present during colony formation. Due to this determination, intermediates are in conflict with the queens. The intermediates possess the ability to reproduce because they have developed ovaries. Additionally the queen invests equally in each offspring, as it is unknown whether the larvae will be deemed an intermediate or queen until later on in adulthood. This means that the intermediates have the chance of producing offspring in the next colony along with other queens, and the queens have little to no control over this reproduction.

=== Morphological appearance ===
In females who are workers and intermediates the ovaries are all in the same stage, making them almost morphologically identical. The queen's ovaries can be distinguished by the presence of post mating oocytes. Additionally, in most colonies workers and intermediates tend to be of equal size while the queen is larger. This size difference is almost impossible to distinguish, meaning that the caste system for these wasps cannot be detected by differences in size alone. This lack of size difference implies that the queens for a colony are not determined during development. The intermediates in the colony have little to no morphological differentiation compared to the queens, making it easy for them to reproduce during the next colony cycle without regulation from the queen.

== Genetic diversity ==
There has been significant genetic differentiation found in A. pallens populations across the Atlantic and Amazonian rain forests. Much of this differentiation has been attributed to the fact that these rain forests are separated by the country of Brazil whose border they cross. Due to this isolation, gene flow among the populations is often unlikely to occur. The A. pallens species has been separated into eight distinct haplogroups which are further separated into groups A, B and C. The wasps in group A are from southern Bahia on the eastern side of Brazil with group B combining haplogroups found in northeastern Bahia, Santa Teresinha, and Vera Cruz (also all on to the east of Brazil.) Group C included wasps found in French Guiana, Ecuador and Peru. The presence of these different haplogroups suggests that at one point the species had a large range of land in which it could inhabit. The hypothesis that forests were connected before the glacial events is supported by the presence of A. pallens in such widespread regions of South America. The species likely began to diversify due to geographic isolation from Savannas in the Cenozoic era.
