= Teresinha =

- Pronunciation: tere'zĩɲɐ
- Gender: Female

Origin
- Origin: diminutive of Teresa
- Region of origin: Portugal

Other names
- Alternative spelling: Terezinha

Teresinha, also spelled Terezinha, is a Portuguese given name or a hypocorism derived from the diminutive of Teresa.

== People ==
- Maria Teresinha Gomes, Portuguese fraudster
- Teresinha de Jesus Correia, Brazilian athlete
- Teresinha Landeiro, Portuguese fado singer
- Teresinha Soares, Brazilian pop art artist

== Places ==
- Terezinha, Pernambuco

== See also ==
- Santa Teresinha (disambiguation)
