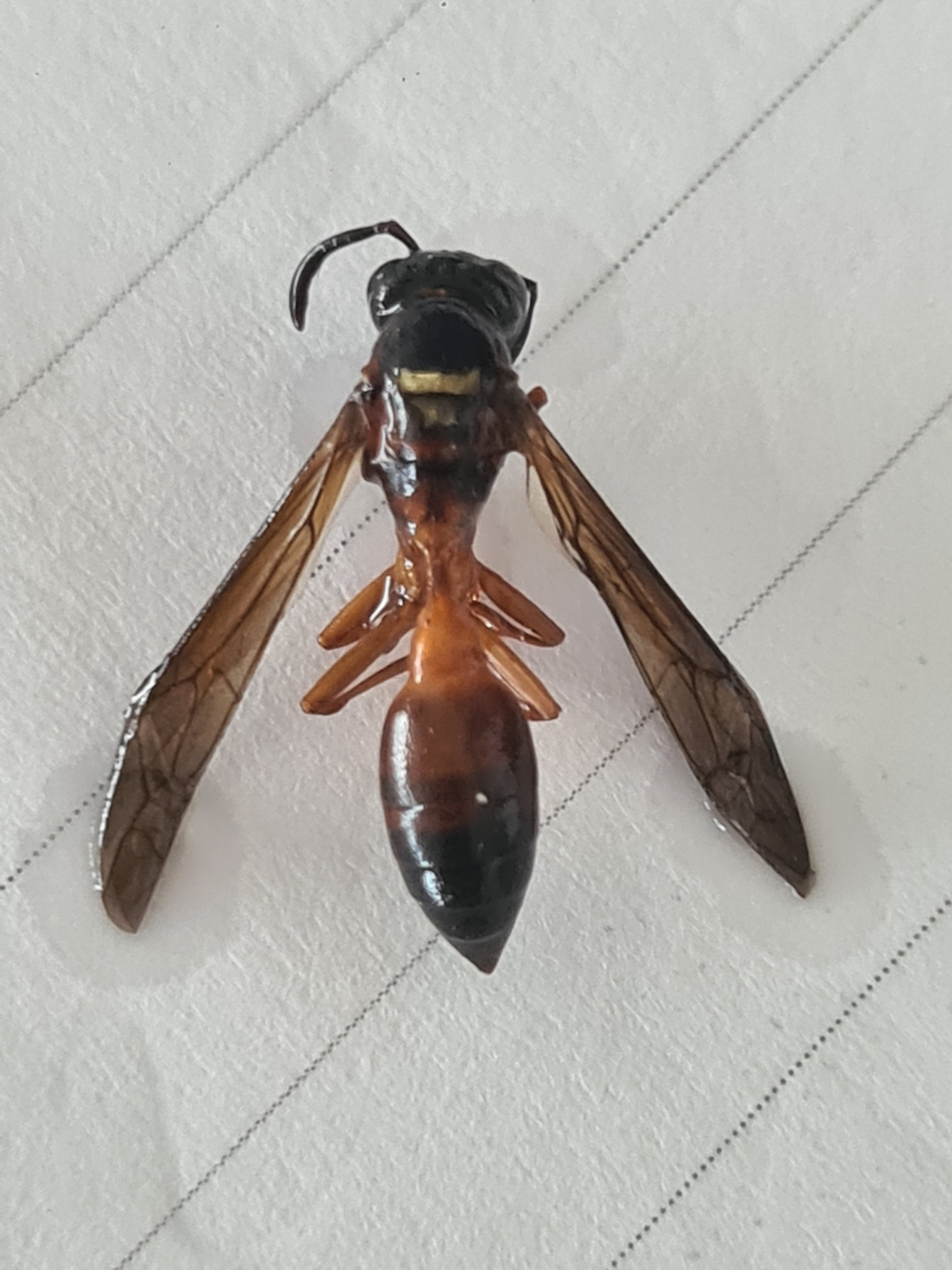

Scientific classification
- Kingdom: Animalia
- Phylum: Arthropoda
- Class: Insecta
- Order: Hymenoptera
- Family: Vespidae
- Subfamily: Polistinae
- Tribe: Epiponini
- Genus: Angiopolybia; Araujo, 1946

= Angiopolybia =

Genus of wasps

Angiopolybia is a genus from the tribe Epiponini. The species was originally described by R L Araujo in 1946.

== Description ==
Angiopolybia is a Neotropical swarming-founding social wasp. The nests of Angiopolybia are ovoid or bottle-shaped, with a single entry at the lower part.

== Taxonomy ==
The genus is composed of four species:

- Angiopolybia pallens
- Angiopolybia paraensis
- Angiopolybia obidensis
- Angiopolybia zischkai

== Range ==
Angiopolybia has been observed from Costa Rica to the south-central region of Brazil, with the exception of Angiopolybia pallens, which only occurs in the northern Atlantic coast of the Amazon. Species boundaries are frequently hard to delimit due to intraspecific morphological variation.
