= National Shrine of the Little Flower Basilica =

Roman Catholic church and shrine

Coordinates: 42°30′15″N 83°10′16″W

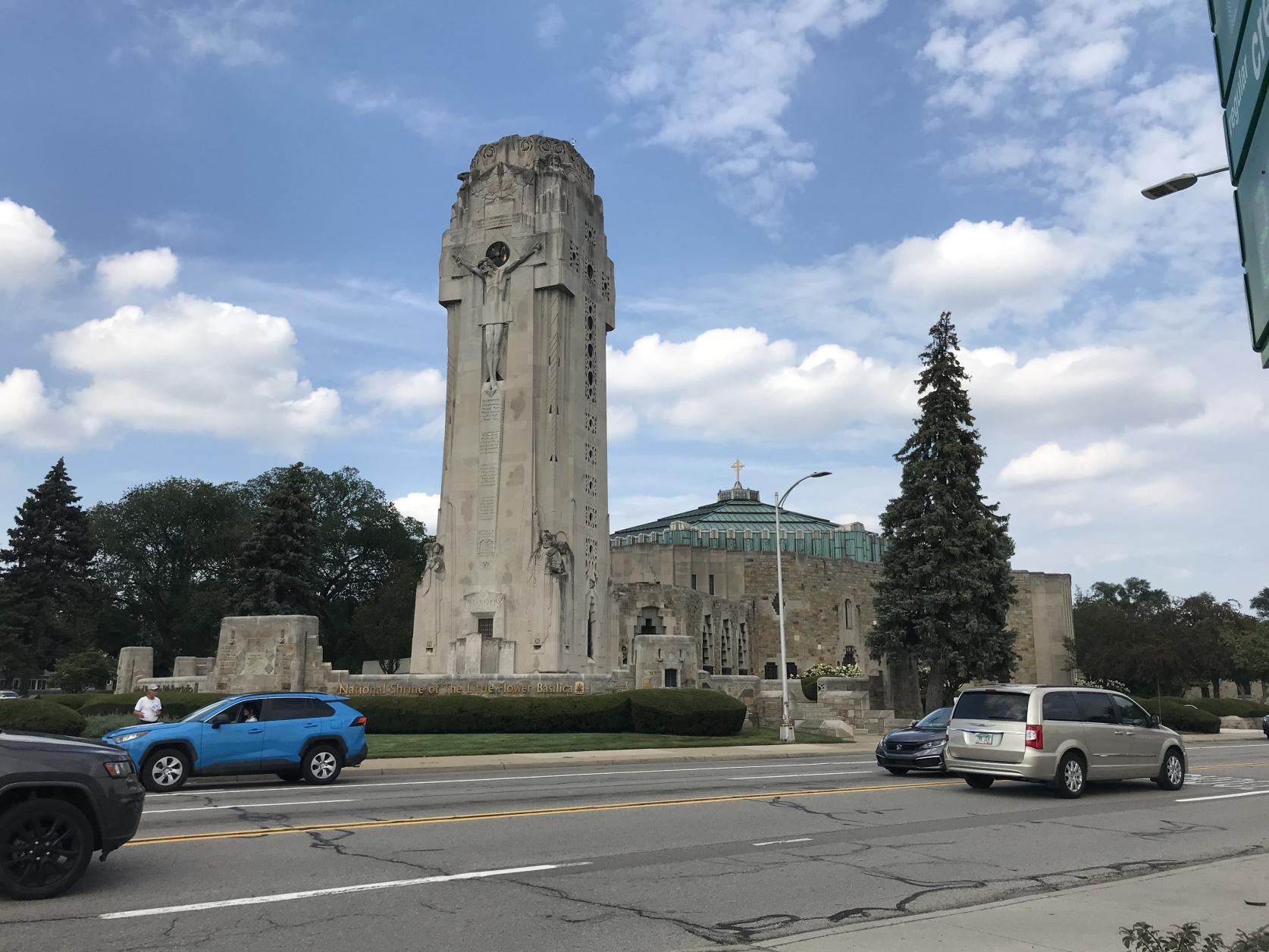
- National Shrine of the Little Flower Basilica
- Location: Royal Oak, Michigan, U.S.
- Denomination: Catholic (Latin Rite)
- Website: www.shrinechurch.com

Architecture
- Architect: Henry J. McGill
- Style: Art Deco
- Years built: 1931–1936

Administration
- Archdiocese: Archdiocese of Detroit

The National Shrine of the Little Flower Basilica is a Catholic church in Royal Oak, Michigan, United States. A designated national shrine, the church building is well-known for its execution in the lavish zig-zag Art Deco style. The structure was completed in two stages between 1931 and 1936.

The sanctuary, at 2100 West Twelve Mile Road at the northeast corner of Woodward Avenue, is a parish of the Archdiocese of Detroit. Its construction was funded by the proceeds of the radio ministry of the Father Charles Coughlin, who broadcast from its tower in the 1930s.

== History ==
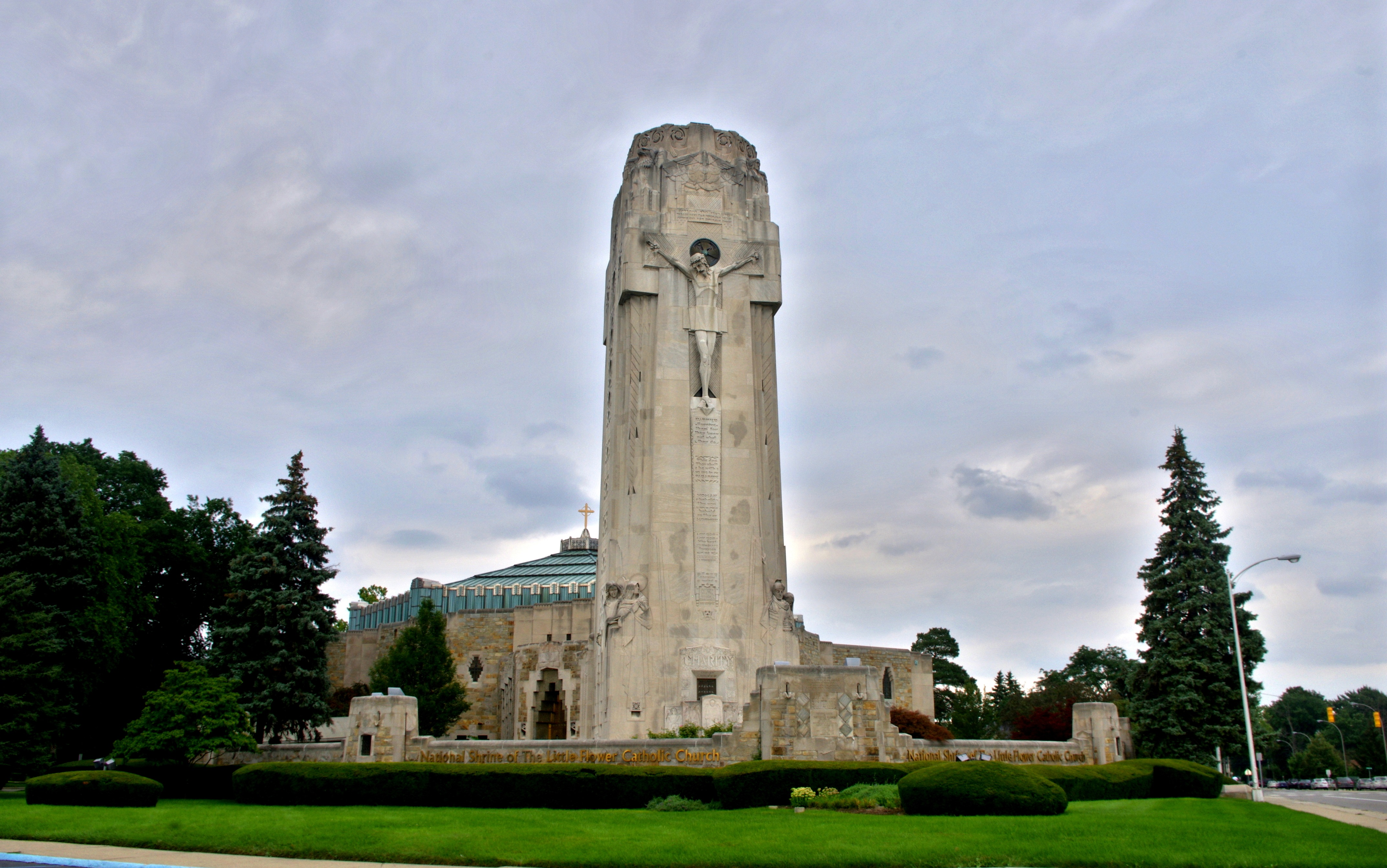
View of the National Shrine from Woodward Avenue

Named in honor of Saint Thérèse of Lisieux (who was known as "the Little Flower"), the church was first built in 1926 in a largely Protestant area. It was founded in 1925, a year before construction started. Within days of the church opening, the Ku Klux Klan burned a cross in front of the church. The original wood structure was destroyed by a fire on March 17, 1936. Construction of the new building started in 1931 and ended in 1936. Its completion was spurred by the destruction of the old structure and it employed large amounts of copper and stone to execute the designs of architect Henry J. McGill, of the New York firm of Hamlin and McGill.

In 1942, with the outbreak of World War II and due to Coughlin’s politics, the church would be subjected a FBI raid which saw parish and personal record seized.

Pope Francis designated the Shrine a minor basilica on January 31, 2015.

=== Pastors ===
- Fr. Charles Coughlin (1925–1966)
- Fr. James L. Hayes (1966–1974)
- Fr. Edward A. Belczak (1975–1980)
- Fr. Edward J. Prus (1975–1987)
- Fr. Edward Haggerty (1987–1990)
- Msgr. John Gordon (1990–1991)
- Msgr. Alexander Joseph Brunett (1991–1994), appointed Bishop of Helena, later Archbishop of Seattle
- Msgr. John Nienstedt (1994–1996)
- Msgr. William Easton (1996–2013)
- Fr. Robert Joseph Fisher (2014–2016), appointed Auxiliary Bishop of Detroit
- Msgr. Robert J. McClory (2016–2020), appointed Bishop of Gary, Indiana
- Fr. Joseph Horn (2020–2023)
- Fr. John Bettin (2023–present)

== Architecture ==
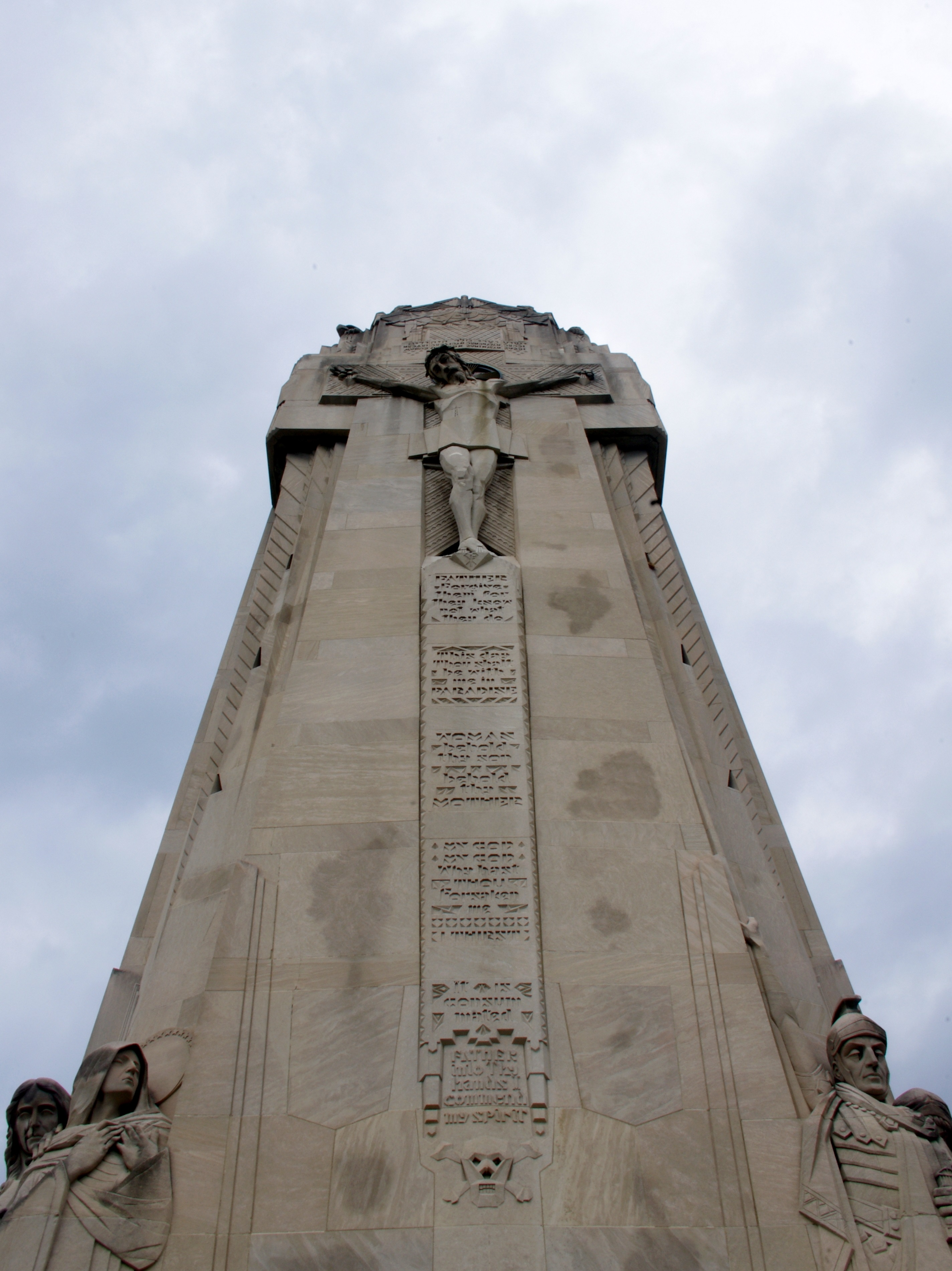
The Charity Crucifixion Tower

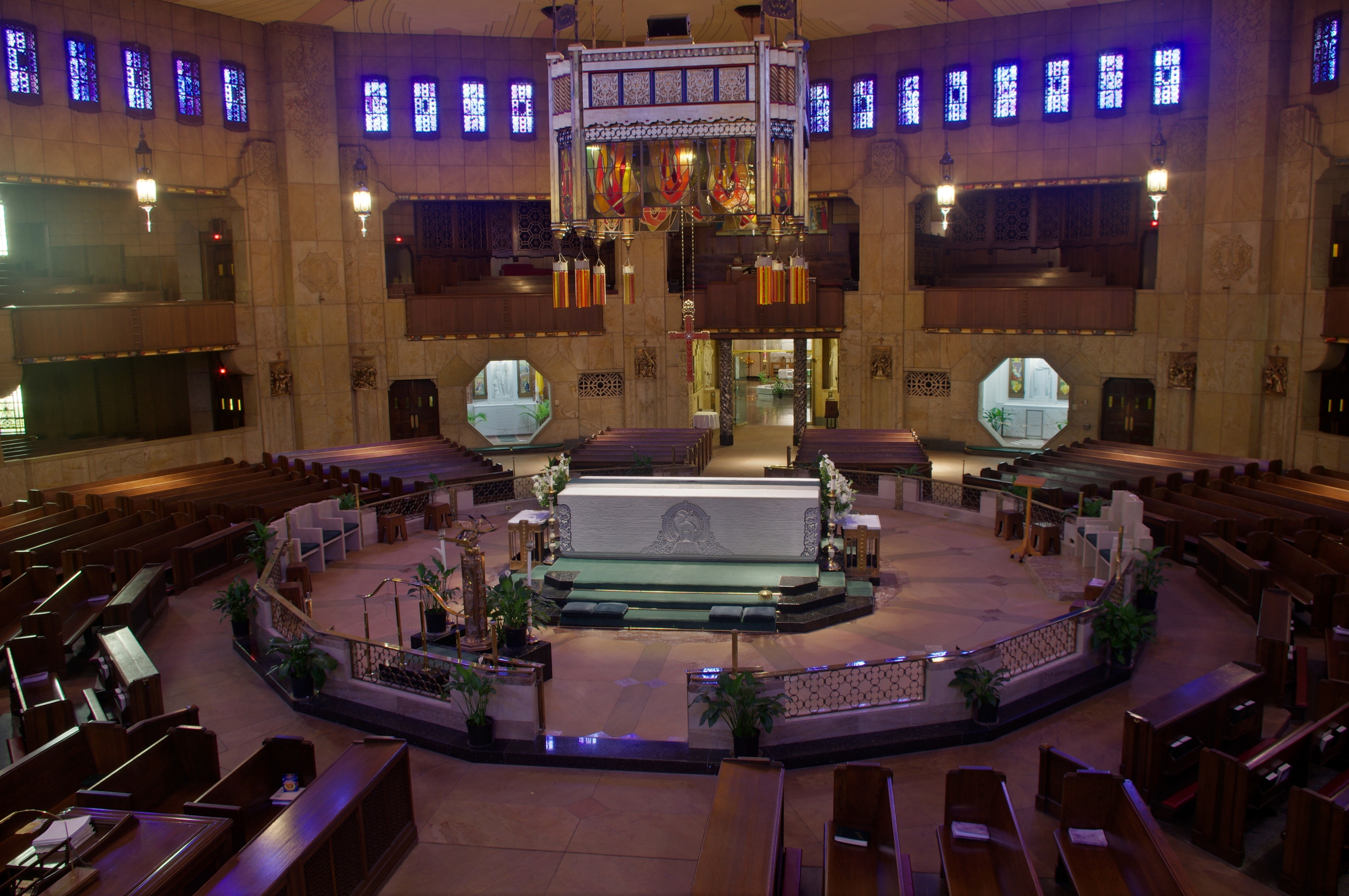
The octagonal nave from the balcony with the chapel entrance visible in the rear

A dramatic limestone Art Deco tower called the Charity Crucifixion Tower, completed in 1931, features integrated figural sculptures by Rene Paul Chambellan, including a large figure of Christ on the cross, 28 ft (8.5 m) high on the Woodward Avenue façade. The sculpture, using Chambellan's design, was completed by Italian stone carver, Enrico (Harry) Liva, chief carver of the Ingalls Stone Company of Bedford, Indiana. It was built as a response to the Ku Klux Klan as a "cross they could not burn". The sides and rear feature windows inside the crucifix which can be lit from within. At the upper corners of the tower are symbols of the Four Evangelists. Carved below the feet of the figure of Christ are the Seven Last Words from the Cross. Just below them is a doorway with "Charity" and "Christ Crucified" carved above it. On the sides of the doorframe are depictions of items associated with the Passion. The doorway leads to a small balcony which can serve as a pulpit. On the front are carved depictions the Archangels Jophiel, Raphael, Michael, Gabriel and Uriel. The pulpit is flanked by depictions of John the Apostle and the Virgin Mary to the left and a Roman Centurion holding a spear and Mary Magdalene on the right. Across the terrace facing the crucifix a depiction of Saint Thérèse of Lisieux is carved into the surrounding wall. This sculpture is also by Chambellan.

Behind the tower are doors leading to a large chapel that connect the tower with the main sanctuary. The altar of the chapel is within the base of the tower. The octagonal nave seats 3,000 on two levels, with the altar in the center. The main building is granite and limestone, with exterior and elaborate interior sculptural work by Corrado Parducci, including a lectern and Stations of the Cross, and hand-painted murals by Beatrice Wilczynski. Set into the exterior walls are stones carved with the names and official flowers of each of the states. The octagon-shaped granite baptismal font was designed by liturgical artists Robert Rambusch and Mario Agustin Locsin y Montenegro.

In 1998, the United States Bishops' Conference declared the site a national shrine.

== See also ==
- List of places named after Saint Thérèse of Lisieux
