= Benedict M. Vierra =

Benedict M. Vierra (June 27, 1914 - January 25, 1994 in Honolulu) was a priest of the Roman Catholic Church. Father Vierra underwent clerical formation in the Philippines where he was ordained to the presbyterate for the Roman Catholic Diocese of Honolulu. On his return to Honolulu, he engaged in pastoral work and was instrumental in the building of the current co-cathedral of the diocese of Honolulu, consecrated under the title of Saint Theresa of the Child Jesus, the French Carmelite mystic and doctor of the church. His close ties to the Philippines enabled him to persuade the Bishop of Honolulu to allow several Philippine religious orders and diocesan clergy to minister to the growing number of Filipino immigrants to Hawaii. Pope John XXIII appointed Father Vierra as a protonotary apostolic, with the title of monsignor, the first in the diocese of Honolulu, the highest non-episcopal prelate entitled to wear the mitre and to pontificate at liturgy, with due regard for the precedence of the diocesan bishop in accordance with Roman Pontifical. He remains the only Hawai'i cleric on whom this honor has been conferred. He also served as vicar general of the Diocese of Honolulu.
