= Saint Therese of the Little Flower Catholic Church =

Catholic church in Reno, NV

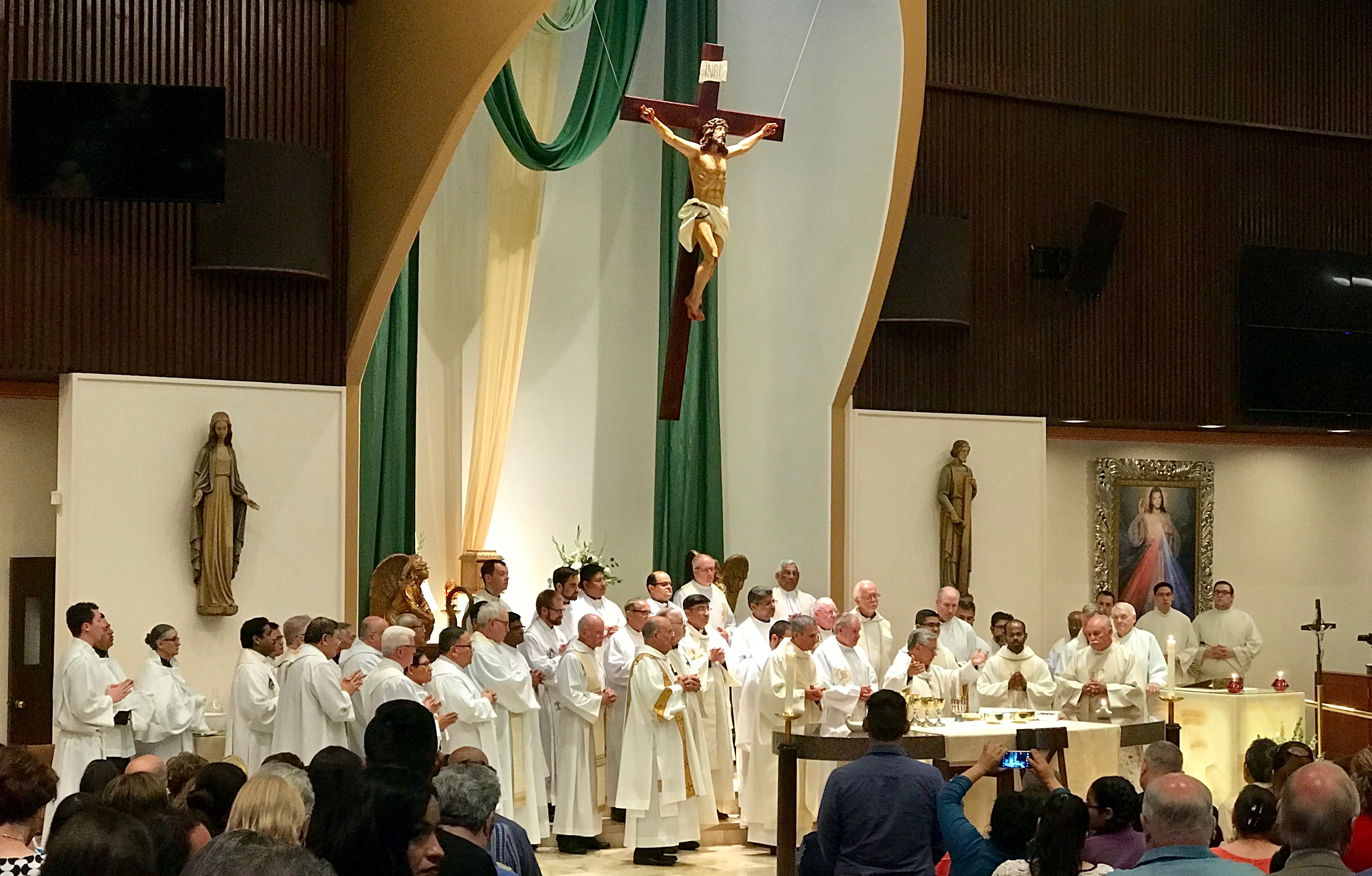
Mass at Saint Therese of the Little Flower Catholic Church celebrated by Randolph Calvo, Bishop of Reno

Saint Thérèse of the Little Flower Catholic Church is a parish of the Roman Catholic Diocese of Reno, in the U.S. state of Nevada. A Catholic elementary school is also located on the grounds, called Little Flower School.

== History ==
The parish was established in 1948 and is in its third location. Until 1978 the church itself was housed in a brick building at Wells Avenue and Vassar Street in Reno, Nevada; the building became a bank branch.

The church was among those visited by relics of Saint Thérèse of Lisieux. This church is one of seven in the United States to enshrine a relic of Our Lady of Guadalupe.

The Little Flower School opened in 1962, and teaches grade K - 8.

Notable alumni include Governor Brian Sandoval.

== Gallery ==
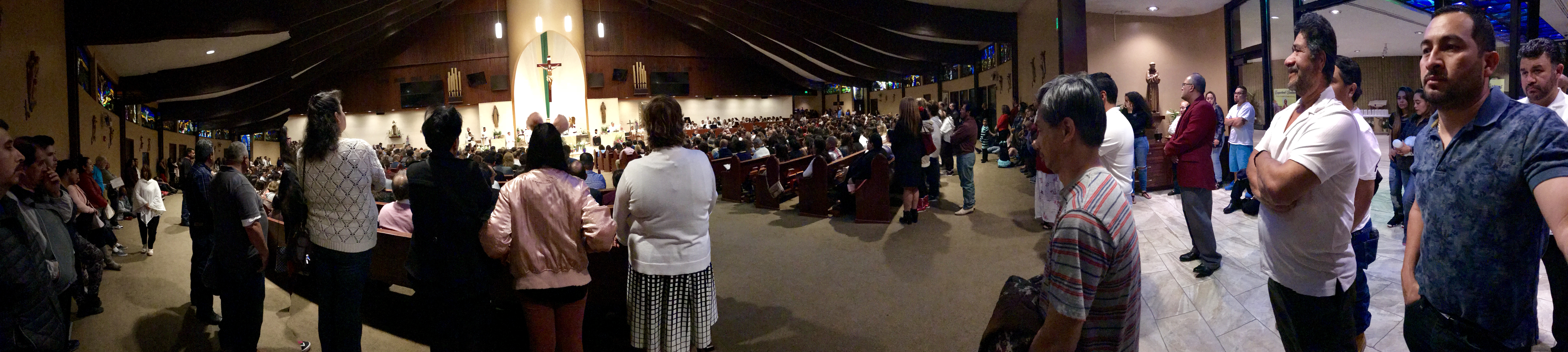
Panoramic view of the interior of the church

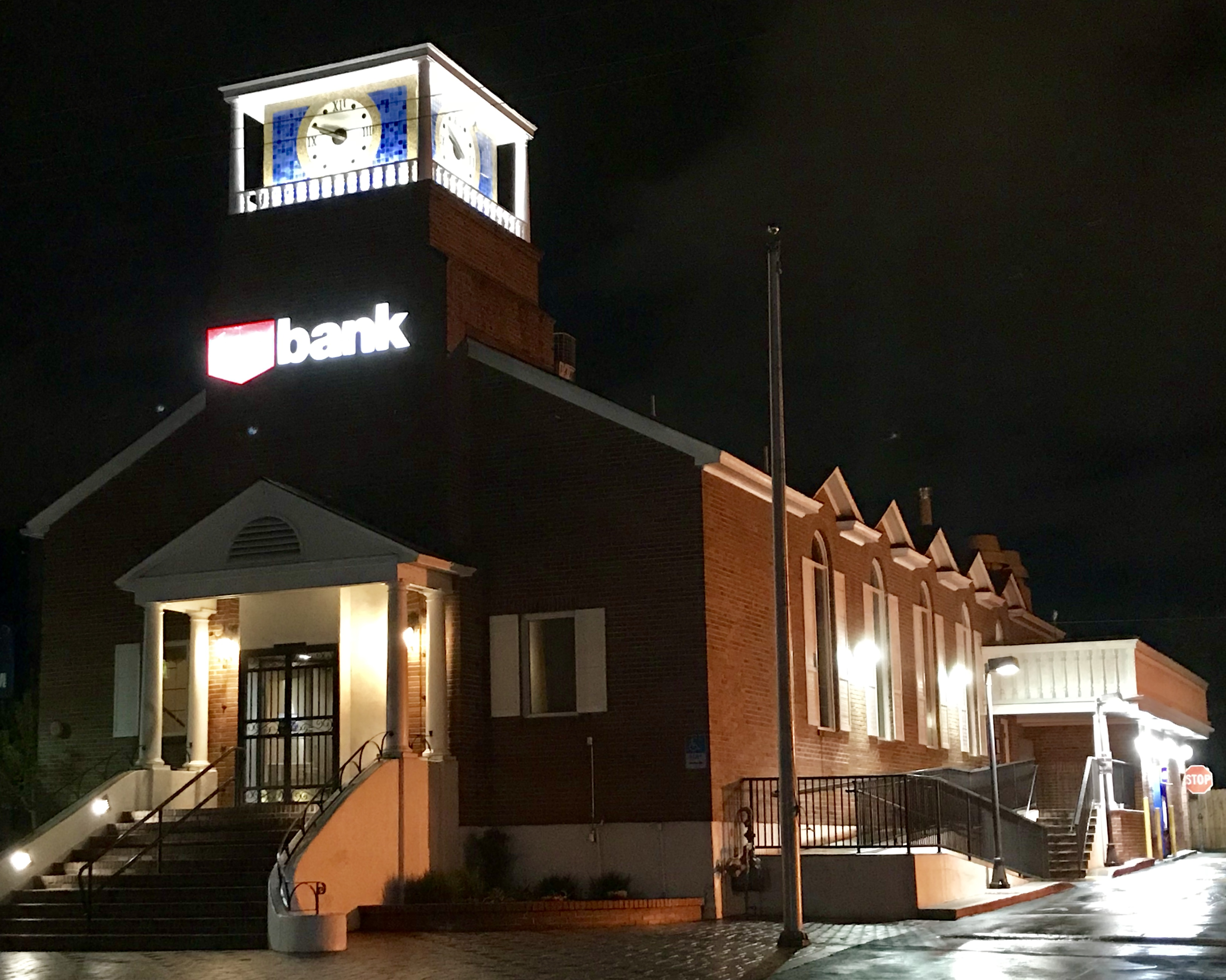
Old location of church at Vassar & Wells in Reno NV

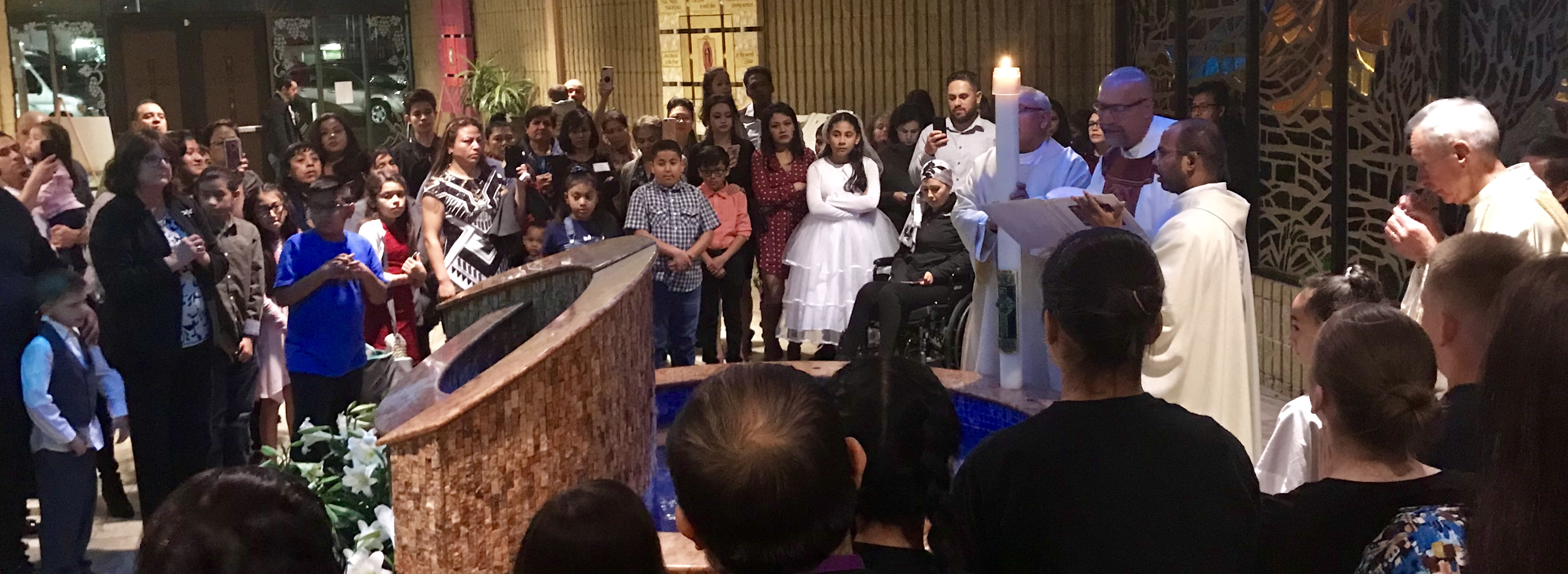
Baptisms are performed in the church vestibule.

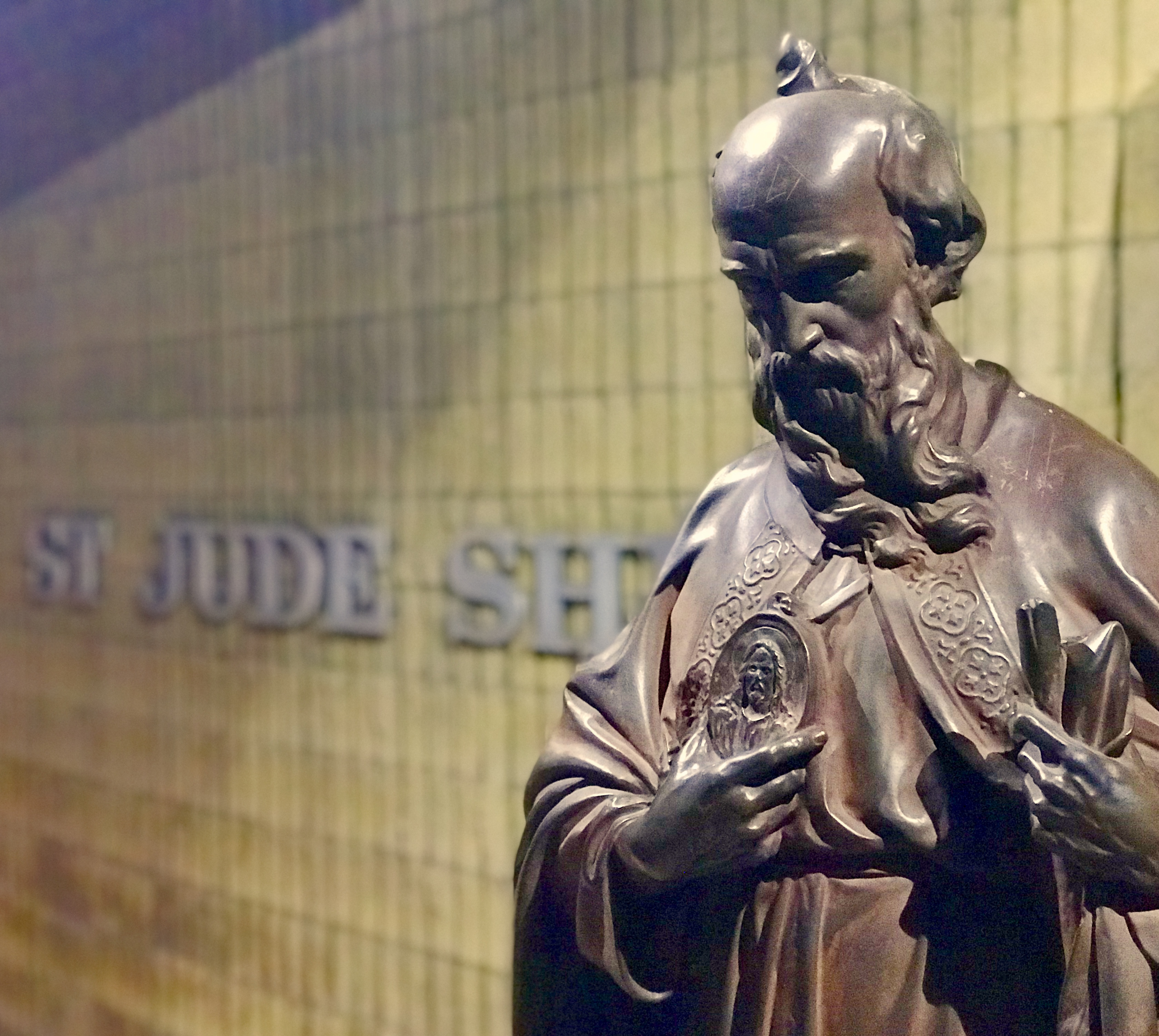
The church is also a Saint Jude Shrine.

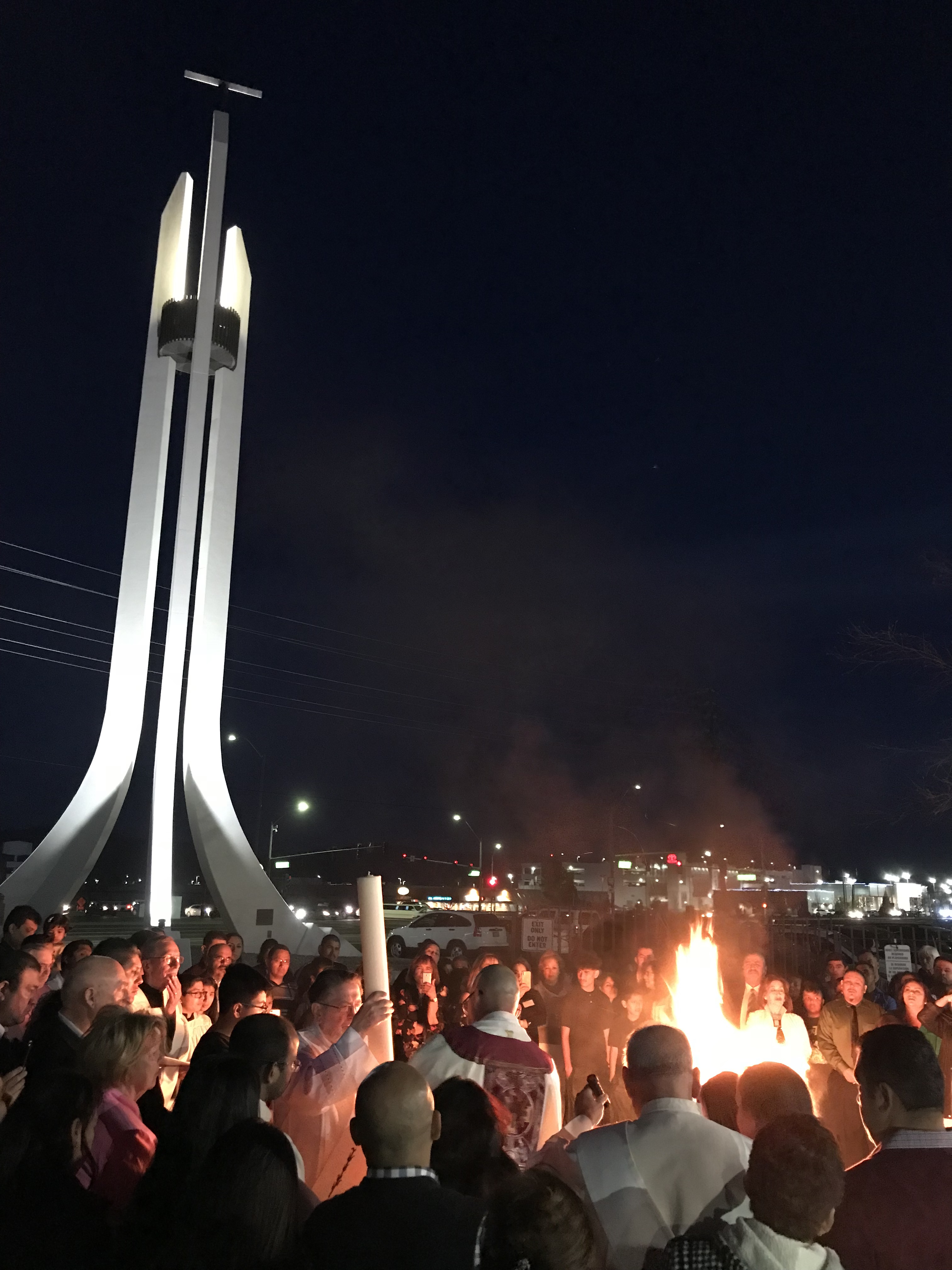
Easter Vigil outside the church

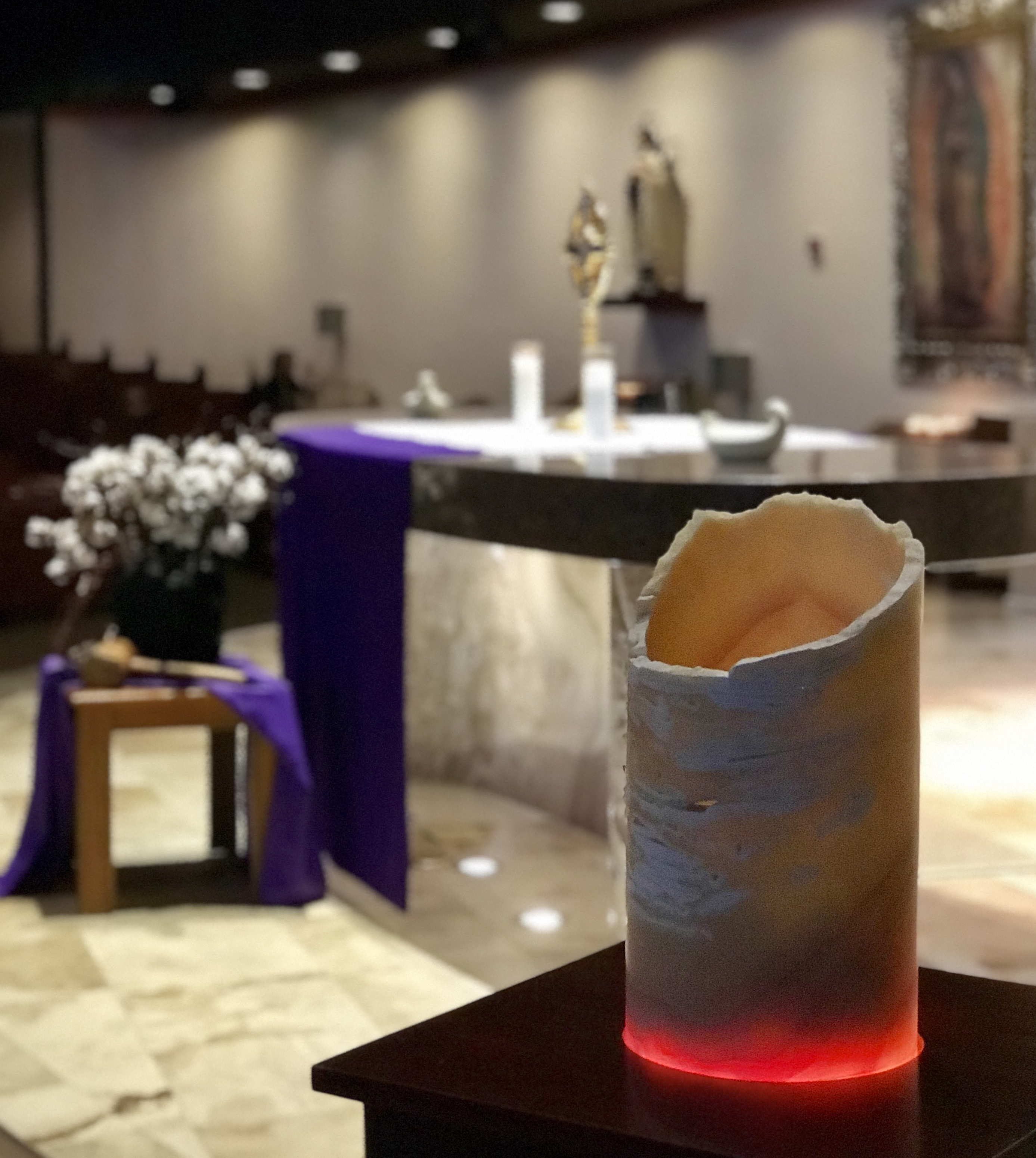
Lumenarium used for prayer intentions

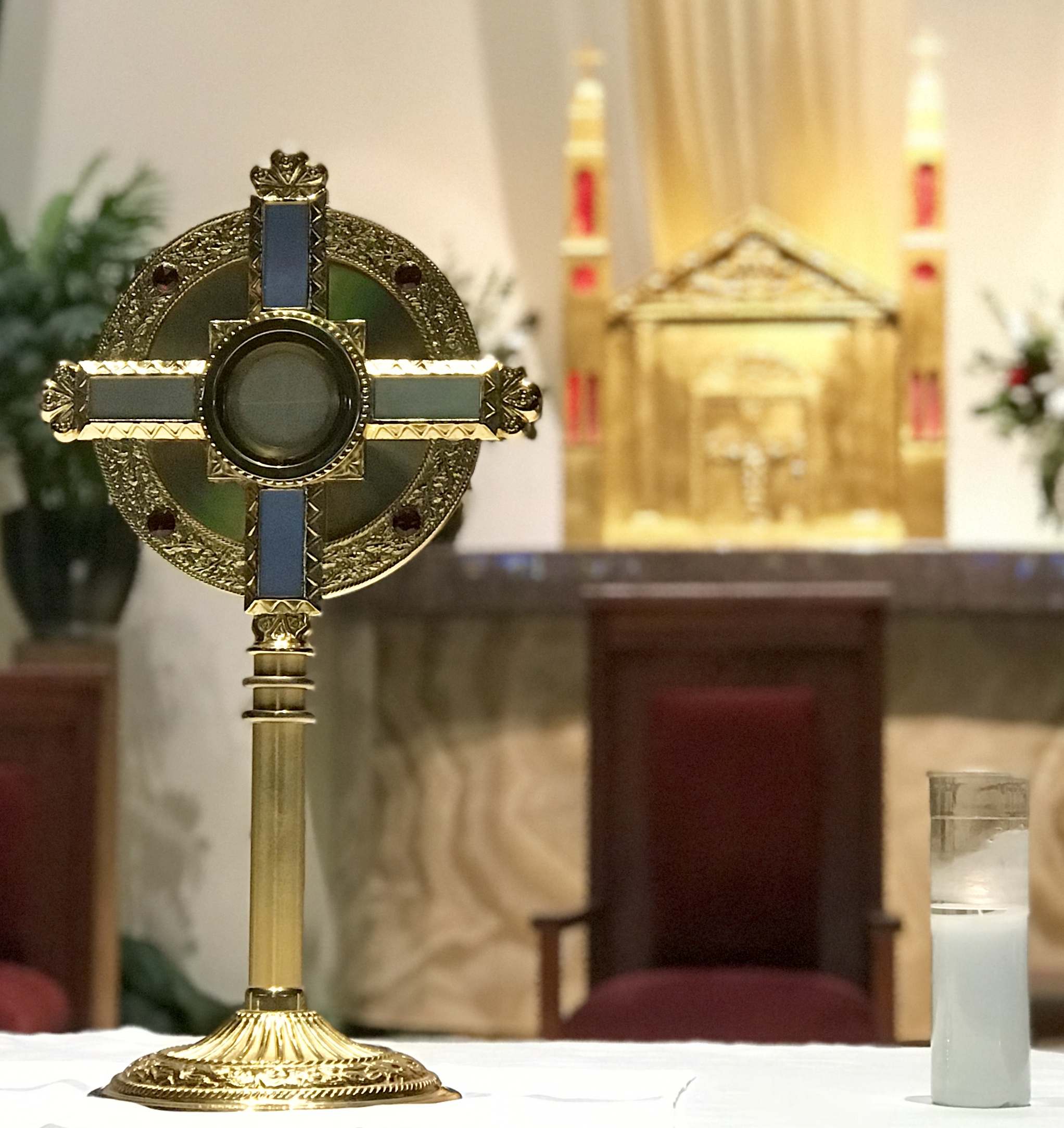
New tabernacle in the background
