= Santa Teresinha, Paraíba =

Coordinates: 7°06′57″S 37°27′07″W

- Municipality
- Flag Coat of arms
- Interactive map of Santa Teresinha, Paraíba
- Country: Brazil
- Region: Northeast
- State: Paraíba
- Mesoregion: Sertao Paraibana

Population (2020)
  - Total: 4,562
- Time zone: UTC−3 (BRT)

Santa Teresinha, Paraíba is a municipality in the state of Paraíba in the Northeast Region of Brazil.

== See also ==
- List of municipalities in Paraíba
