= Santa Terezinha, Pernambuco =

City in Pernambuco State, Brazil

Santa Terezinha
- Municipality of Pernambuco, Brazil
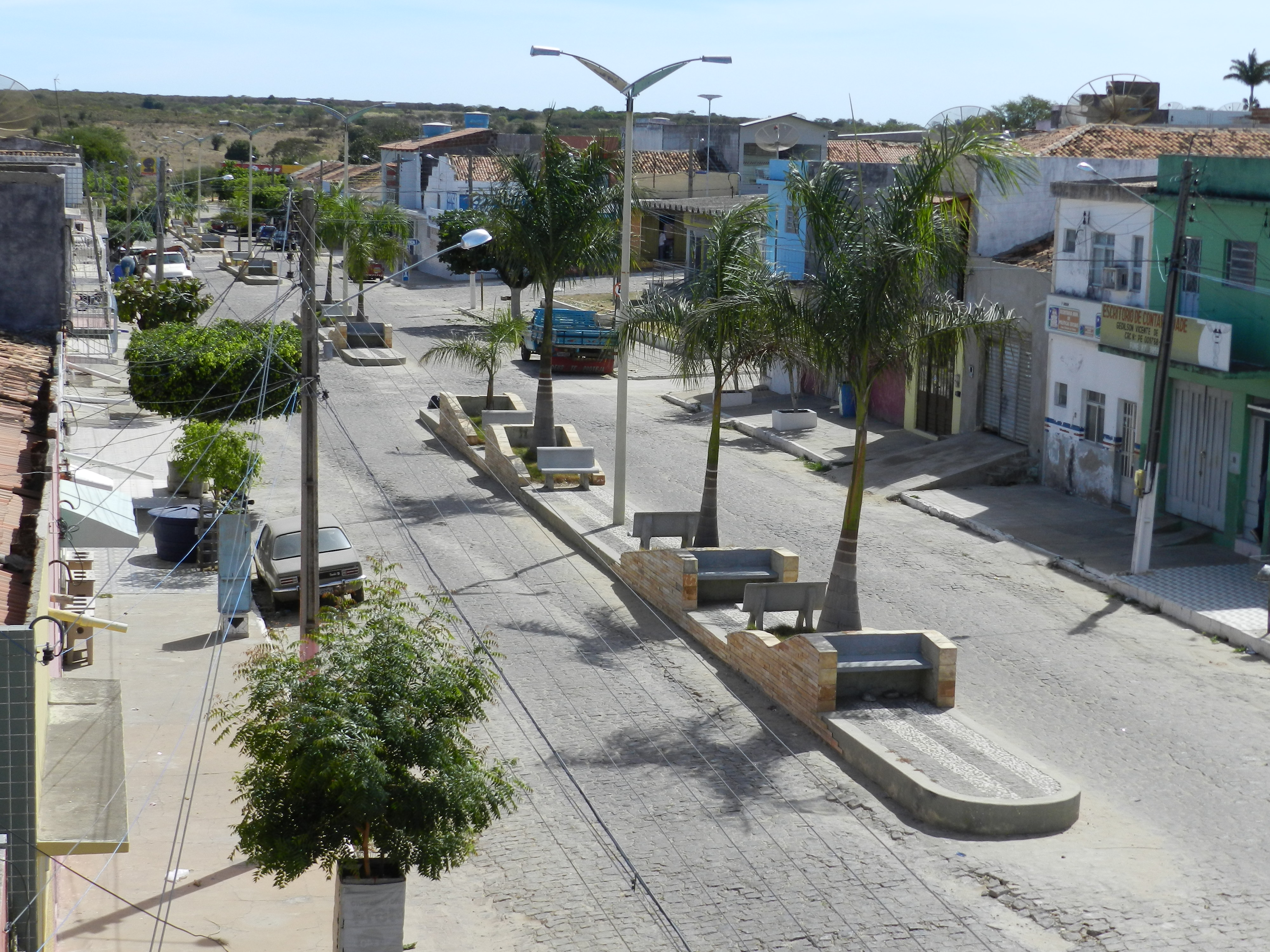
- Santa Terezinha

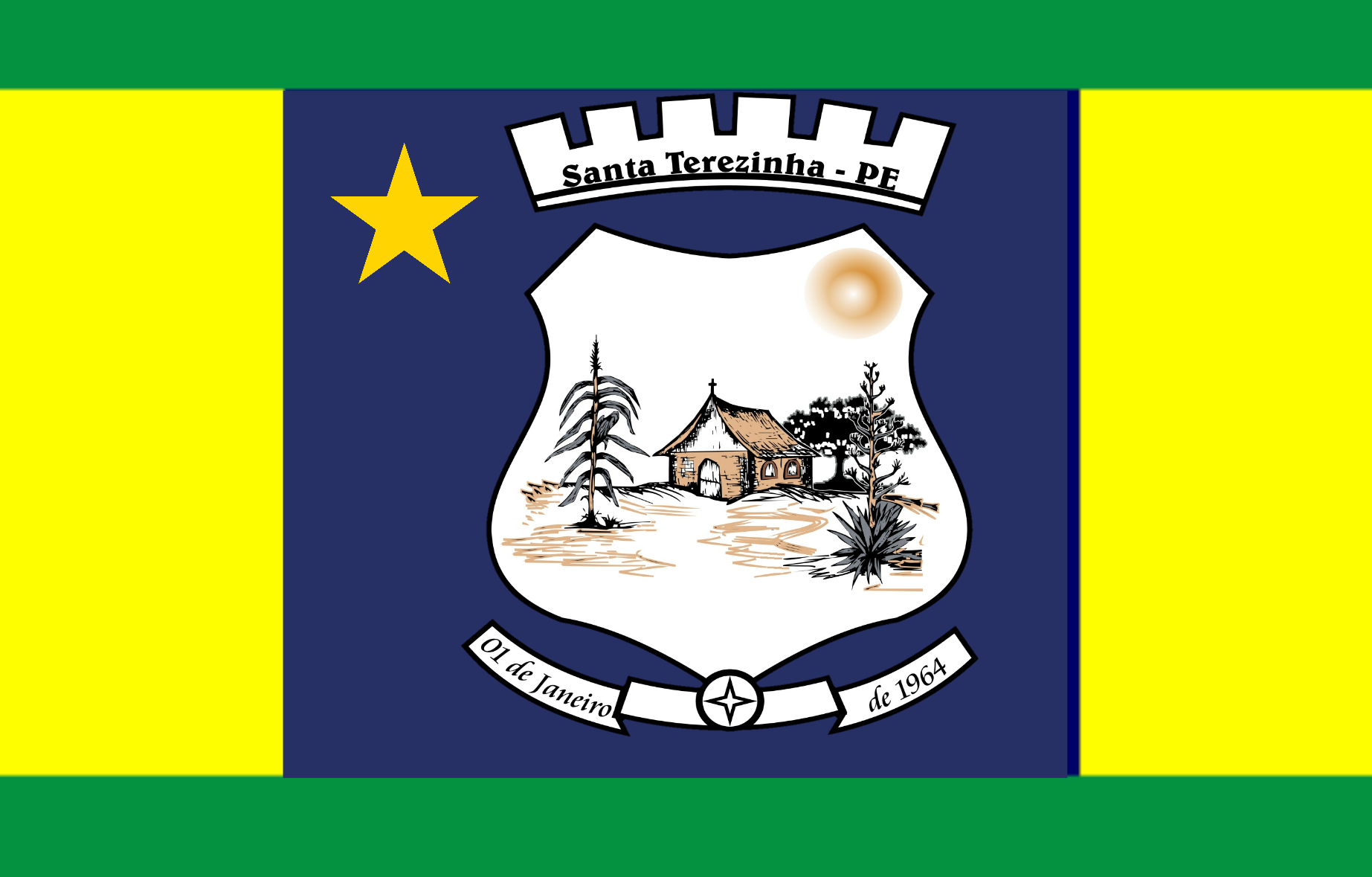
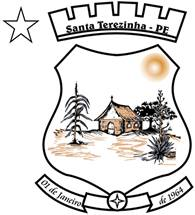
- Flag Coat of arms

- Location of Santa Terezinha in Pernambuco

- Location within Brazil Location within South America
- Coordinates: 7°22′40″S 37°28′48″W
- Country: Brazil
- Region: Northeast
- State: Pernambuco
- Founded: 20 December 1963

Government
  - Mayor: Adeilson Lustosa da Silva (PODE) (2025-2028)
  - Vice Mayor: Jaizinho Ferreira de Andrade (PSB) (2025-2028)

Area
  - Total: 200.327 km^{2} (77.347 sq mi)
- Elevation: 813 m (2,667 ft)

Population (2022 Census)
  - Total: 10,244
  - Estimate (2025): 10,487
  - Density: 51.14/km^{2} (132.5/sq mi)
- Demonym: Santa-terezinhense (Brazilian Portuguese)
- Time zone: UTC-03:00 (Brasília Time)
- Postal code: 56750-000
- HDI (2010): 0.593 – medium
- Website: santaterezinha.pe.gov.br

Santa Terezinha (Central northeastern portuguese pronunciation: [ˈsɐ̃tɐ teɾeˈzĩj̃ɐ]) is a city in the state of Pernambuco, Brazil. The population in 2025, according with IBGE was 10,487 inhabitants and the total area is 200.32 km².

== Geography ==
- State - Pernambuco
- Region - Sertão Pernambucano
- Boundaries - Paraíba state and Brejinho (N); São José do Egito and Tabira (S); São José do Egito (E); Tabira (W).
- Area - 195.58 km²
- Elevation - 813 m
- Hydrography - Pajeú River
- Vegetation - Caatinga
- Climate - Semi arid and tropical hot
- Annual average temperature - 21.7 c
- Distance to Recife - 429.5 km

== Economy ==
The main economic activities in Santa Terezinha are based in agribusiness, especially creation of cattle, sheep, pigss, goats, chickens; and plantations of beans, corn and manioc.

=== Economic Indicators ===
Population	GDP x(1000 R$).	GDP pc (R$)	PE
10.184	29.224	2.942	0.05%

Economy by Sector 2006

Primary sector	Secondary sector	Service sector
12.53%	8.98%	78.49%

=== Health Indicators ===
HDI (2000)	Hospitals (2007)	Hospitals beds (2007)	Children's Mortality every 1000 (2005)
0.602	1	10	29.3

== See also ==
- List of municipalities in Pernambuco
