= Santa Teresinha, Bahia =

Municipality of Bahia State, Brazil

Santa Teresinha
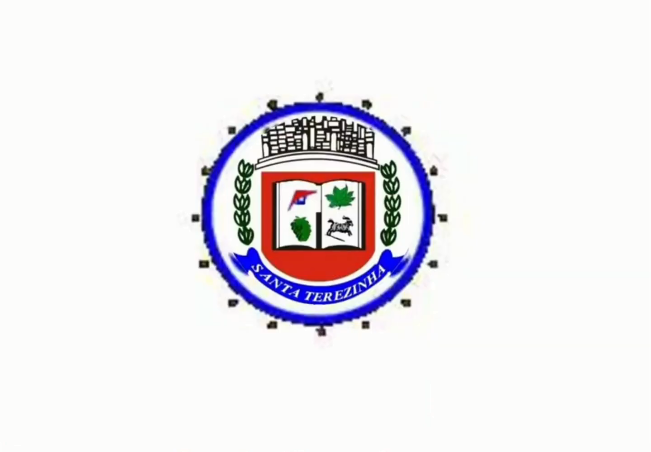
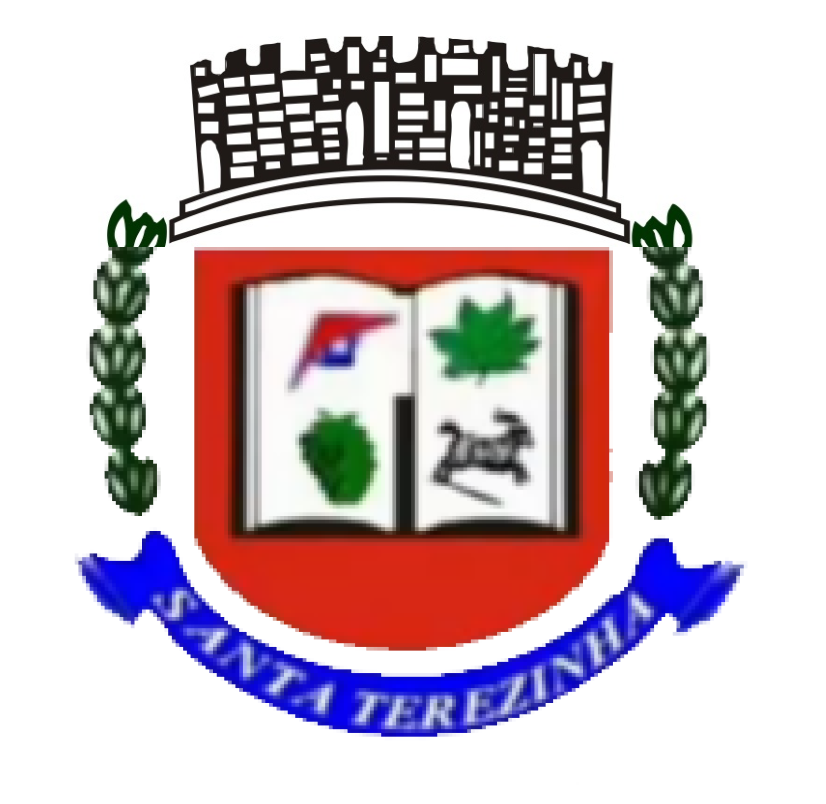
- Flag Coat of arms

- Coordinates: 12°46′19″S 39°31′22″W
- Region: Nordeste
- State: Bahia
- Founded: 14 December 1961
- Elevation: 227 m (745 ft)

Population (2020)
  - Total: 10,464
- Time zone: UTC−3 (BRT)
- Postal code: 2928505

Santa Teresinha is a municipality in the state of Bahia in the North-East region of Brazil.

== See also ==
- List of municipalities in Bahia
